= 2022 Campeonato Uruguayo Primera División =

119th season of the top-tier football league in Uruguay

Liga Profesional de Primera División
- Season: 2022
- Dates: 5 February – 30 October 2022
- Champions: Nacional (49th title)
- Relegated: Albion; Rentistas; Cerrito
- Copa Libertadores: Nacional; Liverpool; Deportivo Maldonado; Boston River
- Copa Sudamericana: River Plate; Peñarol; Defensor Sporting; Danubio
- Matches: 299
- Goals: 653 (2.18 per match)
- Top goalscorer: Thiago Borbas (18 goals)
- Biggest home win: Nacional 5–0 Cerrito (21 July)
- Biggest away win: Boston River 0–6 Nacional (10 April)
- Highest scoring: Albion 3–5 Rentistas (6 February)

The 2022 Liga Profesional de Primera División season, also known as the Campeonato Uruguayo de Primera División 2022, was the 119th season of the Uruguayan Primera División, Uruguay's top-flight football league, and the 92nd in which it is professional. The season, which was named "Walter Devoto", began on 5 February and ended on 30 October 2022 due to the 2022 FIFA World Cup to be held in Qatar during November and December 2022.

Nacional were the champions, winning their forty-ninth league title after placing first in the season's aggregate table and defeating Liverpool in the semi-final match. Peñarol were the defending champions.

== Teams ==
16 teams competed in the season: the top thirteen teams in the relegation table of the 2021 season as well as three promoted teams from the Segunda División. The three lowest placed teams in the relegation table of the 2021 season, Progreso, Sud América, and Villa Española, were relegated to the Segunda División for the 2022 season. They were replaced by Albion, Danubio, and Defensor Sporting, who were promoted from the Segunda División.

Danubio and Defensor Sporting returned to the top flight after one season, whilst Albion played in Primera División for the first time in the professional era. On the other hand, both Sud América and Villa Española were relegated after one season, and Progreso returned to the second tier after four years.

=== Stadiums and locations ===
Locations of the 2022 season teams outside Montevideo.
Locations of the 2022 Primera División teams within Montevideo.

Club	Manager	City	Stadium	Capacity
Albion	(Uruguay) Ignacio Risso	Montevideo	Charrúa	14,000
Boston River	(Uruguay) Ignacio Ithurralde	Trinidad	Juan Antonio Lavalleja	7,000
Cerrito	(Uruguay) Roland Marcenaro	Montevideo	Parque Maracaná	8,000
Cerro Largo	(Uruguay) Mario Saralegui	Melo	Antonio Ubilla	9,000
Danubio	(Uruguay) Jorge Fossati	Montevideo	Jardines del Hipódromo	18,000
Defensor Sporting	(Uruguay) Marcelo Méndez	Montevideo	Luis Franzini	18,000
Deportivo Maldonado	(Uruguay) Francisco Palladino	Maldonado	Domingo Burgueño Miguel	22,000
Fénix	(Uruguay) Ignacio Pallas	Montevideo	Parque Capurro	10,000
Liverpool	(Uruguay) Jorge Bava	Montevideo	Belvedere	10,000
Montevideo City Torque	(Argentina) Lucas Nardi (caretaker)	Montevideo	Centenario	60,235
Montevideo Wanderers	(Uruguay) Sergio Blanco (caretaker)	Montevideo	Parque Alfredo Víctor Viera	11,000
Nacional	(Uruguay) Pablo Repetto	Montevideo	Gran Parque Central	34,000
Peñarol	(Uruguay) Leonardo Ramos	Montevideo	Campeón del Siglo	40,700
Plaza Colonia	(Uruguay) Alejandro Cappuccio	Colonia	Parque Juan Prandi	4,500
Rentistas	(Uruguay) Rodolfo Neme	Montevideo	Complejo Rentistas	10,600
River Plate	(Uruguay) Gustavo Díaz	Montevideo	Parque Federico Omar Saroldi	6,000

=== Managerial changes ===
Team	Outgoing manager	Manner of departure	Date of vacancy	Position in table	Incoming manager	Date of appointment
Torneo Apertura
Nacional	(Uruguay) Martín Ligüera	End of contract	6 December 2021	Pre-season	(Uruguay) Pablo Repetto	11 December 2021
Albion	(Uruguay) Darlyn Gayol	Sacked	17 December 2021	Pre-season	(Uruguay) Ignacio Risso	27 December 2021
Cerrito	(Uruguay) Roland Marcenaro	End of contract	31 December 2021	Pre-season	(Uruguay) Adrián Fernández	15 January 2022
Defensor Sporting	(Uruguay) Héctor Rodríguez	Sacked	27 February 2022	14th	(Uruguay) Marcelo Méndez	2 March 2022
Rentistas	(Uruguay) Diego Jaume	Sacked	12 March 2022	10th	(Uruguay) Marcos Villano (Note: Caretaker manager.)	14 March 2022
Cerrito	(Uruguay) Adrián Fernández	Resigned	11 April 2022	16th	(Uruguay) Alberto Quintela	12 April 2022
Cerro Largo	(Uruguay) Danielo Núñez	Resigned	22 April 2022	15th	(Argentina) Héctor Bracamonte	22 April 2022
Montevideo City Torque	(Uruguay) Román Cuello	Sacked	29 April 2022	12th	(Uruguay) Sebastián Eguren	2 May 2022
Rentistas	(Uruguay) Marcos Villano	End of caretaker spell	13 May 2022	11th	(Uruguay) Leonel Rocco	13 May 2022
Torneo Intermedio
Cerrito	(Uruguay) Alberto Quintela	End of caretaker spell	7 June 2022	Pre-tournament	(Uruguay) Mario Szlafmyc	7 June 2022
Cerrito	(Uruguay) Mario Szlafmyc	Resigned	9 July 2022	8th, Serie B	(Uruguay) Pablo Fernández	9 July 2022
Cerrito	(Uruguay) Pablo Fernández	End of caretaker spell	27 July 2022	8th, Serie B	(Uruguay) Walter Pandiani	27 July 2022
Torneo Clausura
Peñarol	(Uruguay) Mauricio Larriera	Resigned	2 August 2022	14th	(Uruguay) Leonardo Ramos	2 August 2022
Rentistas	(Uruguay) Leonel Rocco	Resigned	7 August 2022	16th	(Uruguay) Rodolfo Neme	8 August 2022
Plaza Colonia	(Uruguay) Eduardo Espinel	Sacked	12 August 2022	7th	(Uruguay) Alejandro Cappuccio (Note: Sebastián Díaz was the caretaker manager for the Torneo Clausura 6th round match against Albion.)	17 August 2022
Cerrito	(Uruguay) Walter Pandiani	Sacked	29 August 2022	15th	(Uruguay) Roland Marcenaro	29 August 2022
Cerro Largo	(Argentina) Héctor Bracamonte	Resigned	29 August 2022	16th	(Uruguay) Mario Saralegui	30 August 2022
Montevideo City Torque	(Uruguay) Sebastián Eguren	Resigned	19 September 2022	15th	(Argentina) Lucas Nardi (Note: Caretaker manager until the end of the season.)	22 September 2022
Montevideo Wanderers	(Uruguay) Daniel Carreño	Resigned	28 September 2022	13th	(Uruguay) Sergio Blanco	28 September 2022

== Torneo Apertura ==
The Torneo Apertura, named "José "Pino" Marciano", was the first tournament of the 2022 season. It began on 5 February 2022 and ended on 6 June 2022.

=== Standings ===
Pos	Team	Pld	W	D	L	GF	GA	GD	Pts	Qualification
1	Liverpool	15	10	2	3	21	8	+13	32	Qualification for Championship playoff
2	Nacional	15	8	4	3	28	10	+18	28	
3	Deportivo Maldonado	15	8	3	4	20	14	+6	27	
4	Boston River	15	8	3	4	20	16	+4	27	
5	Peñarol	15	7	5	3	10	6	+4	26	
6	Danubio	15	6	6	3	13	9	+4	24	
7	Fénix	15	7	2	6	15	16	−1	23	
8	River Plate	15	5	6	4	20	15	+5	21	
9	Montevideo Wanderers	15	5	6	4	16	11	+5	21	
10	Defensor Sporting	15	5	5	5	14	16	−2	20	
11	Rentistas (Note: Rentistas were awarded three points and Cerrito were deducted three points due to Cerrito fielding the ineligible player Franco Martínez during the match between both teams.)	15	5	1	9	16	21	−5	19	
12	Plaza Colonia	15	2	7	6	12	15	−3	13	
13	Montevideo City Torque	15	2	7	6	16	20	−4	13	
14	Cerro Largo	15	3	3	9	7	23	−16	12	
15	Albion	15	2	5	8	16	31	−15	11	
16	Cerrito	15	2	5	8	9	22	−13	8	

Source: AUF, Soccerway
Rules for classification: 1) Points, 2) Playoff game, in case two teams are tied for first place.
If there are more than two teams tied in points: 2) Goal difference, 3) Goals for, 4) Head-to-head record, 5) Drawing of lots, 6) Playoff game, in case two teams are still tied for first place.

=== Results ===
Home \ Away	ALB	BOR	CSC	CRL	DAN	DFS	DMA	FNX	LIV	MCT	WAN	NAC	PEÑ	PCO	REN	RIV
Albion	—	1–2	2–2	2–1	1–2	0–3	—	—	—	—	1–1	—	1–1	—	3–5	—
Boston River	—	—	0–1	3–0	—	1–1	2–0	—	2–3	3–1	—	0–6	—	0–0	—	—
Cerrito	—	—	—	—	0–1	—	0–3	—	0–1	2–2	0–2	—	0–0	1–1	2–1	—
Cerro Largo	—	—	1–0	—	—	0–0	1–0	—	1–2	—	—	0–2	—	0–5	—	—
Danubio	—	0–0	—	2–0	—	1–2	—	—	—	—	0–0	2–1	0–1	—	0–1	—
Defensor Sporting	—	—	0–0	—	—	—	1–1	2–1	0–3	1–3	—	0–2	—	0–0	—	3–2
Deportivo Maldonado	0–0	—	—	—	1–2	—	—	0–1	1–0	2–1	—	—	—	3–1	—	2–1
Fénix	2–1	0–2	2–0	2–0	0–0	—	—	—	—	—	0–3	—	1–0	—	2–1	—
Liverpool	4–0	—	—	—	0–1	—	—	1–0	—	2–0	—	—	—	1–0	1–0	2–1
Montevideo City Torque	1–2	—	—	1–1	1–1	—	—	1–2	—	—	—	—	0–1	1–1	2–0	0–0
Montevideo Wanderers	—	1–2	—	1–0	—	1–0	0–1	—	0–0	1–1	—	2–2	—	—	—	—
Nacional	2–0	—	3–0	—	—	—	2–3	1–0	0–0	1–1	—	—	—	1–0	—	1–1
Peñarol	—	1–0	—	0–1	—	0–1	1–1	—	2–1	—	1–0	1–0	—	—	—	—
Plaza Colonia	1–1	—	—	—	1–1	—	—	1–1	—	—	1–0	—	0–1	—	0–3	0–1
Rentistas	—	0–1	—	2–0	—	1–0	1–2	—	—	—	1–3	0–4	0–0	—	—	—
River Plate	4–1	1–2	3–1	1–1	0–0	—	—	3–1	—	—	1–1	—	0–0	—	1–0	—

Source: AUF, Soccerway
Legend: Blue = home team win; Yellow = draw; Red = away team win.

== Torneo Intermedio ==
The Torneo Intermedio was the second tournament of the 2022 season, played between the Apertura and Clausura tournaments, and returned after a one-year hiatus caused by the effects of the COVID-19 pandemic. It consisted of two groups whose composition depended on the final standings of the Torneo Apertura: teams in odd-numbered positions played in Serie A, and teams in even-numbered positions played in Serie B. It began on 10 June and ended on 27 July, and the winners were granted a berth into the 2023 Copa Sudamericana and the 2023 Supercopa Uruguaya.

=== Serie A ===
Pos	Team	Pld	W	D	L	GF	GA	GD	Pts	Qualification	LIV	WAN	PEÑ	ALB	MCT	FNX	DMA	REN
1	Liverpool	7	4	2	1	11	6	+5	14	Advance to Torneo Intermedio Final	—	—	—	0–0	—	2–2	3–1	2–0
2	Montevideo Wanderers	7	4	2	1	11	7	+4	14		1–0	—	3–3	—	1–0	—	—	3–1
3	Peñarol	7	3	2	2	12	8	+4	11		0–1	—	—	—	1–2	0–0	—	2–0
4	Albion	7	3	2	2	7	7	0	11		—	1–1	1–3	—	1–0	—	2–3	—
5	Montevideo City Torque	7	3	1	3	10	8	+2	10		2–3	—	—	—	—	2–0	—	3–1
6	Fénix	7	2	3	2	4	5	−1	9		—	1–0	—	0–1	—	—	0–0	—
7	Deportivo Maldonado	7	1	3	3	8	12	−4	6		—	1–2	1–3	—	1–1	—	—	—
8	Rentistas	7	0	1	6	3	13	−10	1		—	—	—	0–1	—	0–1	1–1	—

Source: AUF, Soccerway
Legend: Blue = home team win; Yellow = draw; Red = away team win.
Rules for classification: 1) Points, 2) Goal difference, 3) Goals for, 4) Head-to-head record, 5) Drawing of lots, 6) Playoff game, in case two teams are tied for first place.

=== Serie B ===
Pos	Team	Pld	W	D	L	GF	GA	GD	Pts	Qualification	NAC	BOR	DFS	RIV	CRL	PCO	DAN	CSC
1	Nacional	7	6	1	0	15	1	+14	19	Advance to Torneo Intermedio Final	—	2–0	—	3–0	—	3–1	—	5–0
2	Boston River	7	4	1	2	8	5	+3	13		—	—	2–3	—	2–0	—	2–0	1–0
3	Defensor Sporting	7	4	1	2	10	8	+2	13		0–1	—	—	—	1–0	1–2	2–1	—
4	River Plate	7	2	3	2	7	6	+1	9		—	0–1	1–1	—	—	—	—	3–0
5	Cerro Largo	7	2	3	2	4	4	0	9		0–0	—	—	0–0	—	1–0	—	—
6	Plaza Colonia	7	2	2	3	6	7	−1	8		—	0–0	—	0–0	—	—	—	3–0
7	Danubio	7	2	1	4	6	9	−3	7		0–1	—	—	1–3	1–1	2–0	—	—
8	Cerrito	7	0	0	7	1	17	−16	0		—	—	1–2	—	0–2	—	0–1	—

Source: AUF, Soccerway
Legend: Blue = home team win; Yellow = draw; Red = away team win.
Rules for classification: 1) Points, 2) Goal difference, 3) Goals for, 4) Head-to-head record, 5) Drawing of lots, 6) Playoff game, in case two teams are tied for first place.

=== Torneo Intermedio Final ===
27 July 2022
20:00 UTC−3

Liverpool	0–1	Nacional
	Report	Rodríguez 37'

Estadio Centenario, Montevideo
Referee: Andrés Matonte

== Torneo Clausura ==
The Torneo Clausura, named "Rubén Lorenzo", was the third and last tournament of the 2022 season. It began on 30 July 2022 and ended on 24 October 2022.

=== Standings ===
Pos	Team	Pld	W	D	L	GF	GA	GD	Pts	Qualification
1	Nacional	15	10	4	1	26	9	+17	34	Qualification for Championship playoff
2	River Plate	15	9	3	3	29	12	+17	30	
3	Deportivo Maldonado	15	8	6	1	19	11	+8	30	
4	Liverpool	15	8	4	3	23	12	+11	28	
5	Danubio	15	6	7	2	19	10	+9	25	
6	Defensor Sporting	15	7	4	4	18	12	+6	25	
7	Boston River	15	6	4	5	21	15	+6	22	
8	Peñarol	15	6	4	5	20	16	+4	22	
9	Cerro Largo	15	5	4	6	11	18	−7	19	
10	Fénix	15	4	5	6	13	15	−2	17	
11	Montevideo Wanderers	15	4	4	7	12	19	−7	16	
12	Albion	15	4	4	7	11	19	−8	16	
13	Plaza Colonia	15	4	2	9	11	20	−9	14	
14	Montevideo City Torque	15	4	1	10	12	24	−12	13	
15	Rentistas	15	3	1	11	16	31	−15	10	
16	Cerrito	15	2	3	10	10	28	−18	9	

Source: AUF, Soccerway
Rules for classification: 1) Points, 2) Playoff game, in case two teams are tied for first place.
If there are more than two teams tied in points: 2) Goal difference, 3) Goals for, 4) Head-to-head record, 5) Drawing of lots, 6) Playoff game, in case two teams are still tied for first place.

=== Results ===
Home \ Away	ALB	BOR	CSC	CRL	DAN	DFS	DMA	FNX	LIV	MCT	WAN	NAC	PEÑ	PCO	REN	RIV
Albion	—	—	—	—	—	—	1–3	1–1	1–1	1–0	—	0–1	—	1–0	—	0–2
Boston River	1–0	—	—	—	0–1	—	—	1–1	—	—	2–2	—	2–1	—	3–0	1–2
Cerrito	0–0	0–3	—	0–0	—	1–2	—	0–2	—	—	—	1–2	—	—	—	1–5
Cerro Largo	1–2	1–1	—	—	1–0	—	—	1–0	—	1–2	1–1	—	0–2	—	2–1	0–5
Danubio	3–0	—	0–0	—	—	—	0–0	1–1	1–1	3–2	—	—	—	1–1	—	3–0
Defensor Sporting	2–0	0–1	—	0–1	1–1	—	—	—	—	—	1–0	—	2–3	—	2–3	—
Deportivo Maldonado	—	2–1	2–1	0–1	—	0–0	—	—	—	—	1–0	2–1	1–1	—	2–1	—
Fénix	—	—	—	—	—	0–0	0–1	—	0–3	1–0	—	1–1	—	0–1	—	1–2
Liverpool	—	3–2	3–0	1–0	—	1–3	1–1	—	—	—	1–1	0–1	0–1	—	—	—
Montevideo City Torque	—	0–2	0–1	—	—	0–2	3–3	—	0–2	—	1–0	0–3	—	—	—	—
Montevideo Wanderers	0–0	—	2–1	—	0–3	—	—	2–1	—	—	—	—	0–2	2–1	1–0	1–2
Nacional	—	1–0	—	1–1	2–0	1–1	—	—	—	—	2–0	—	3–1	—	3–0	—
Peñarol	2–0	—	3–1	—	1–1	—	—	0–1	—	0–1	—	—	—	0–1	2–2	1–1
Plaza Colonia	—	1–1	1–3	2–0	—	0–1	0–1	—	1–3	0–2	—	1–3	—	—	—	—
Rentistas	2–4	—	3–0	—	0–1	—	—	1–3	0–2	3–0	—	—	—	0–1	—	0–5
River Plate	—	—	—	—	—	0–1	0–0	—	0–1	2–1	—	1–1	—	2–0	—	—

Source: AUF, Soccerway
Legend: Blue = home team win; Yellow = draw; Red = away team win.

== Aggregate table ==
Pos	Team	Pld	W	D	L	GF	GA	GD	Pts	Qualification
1	Nacional (C)	37	24	9	4	69	20	+49	81	Qualification for Championship playoff and Copa Libertadores group stage
2	Liverpool	37	22	8	7	55	26	+29	74	Qualification for Championship playoff and Copa Libertadores group stage
3	Deportivo Maldonado	37	17	12	8	47	37	+10	63	Qualification for Copa Libertadores second stage
4	Boston River	37	18	8	11	49	36	+13	62	Qualification for Copa Libertadores first stage
5	River Plate	37	16	12	9	56	33	+23	60	Qualification for Copa Sudamericana first stage
6	Peñarol	37	16	11	10	42	30	+12	59	Qualification for Copa Sudamericana first stage
7	Defensor Sporting	37	16	10	11	42	36	+6	58	Qualification for Copa Sudamericana first stage
8	Danubio	37	14	14	9	38	28	+10	56	Qualification for Copa Sudamericana first stage
9	Montevideo Wanderers	37	13	12	12	39	37	+2	51	
10	Fénix	37	13	10	14	32	36	−4	49	
11	Cerro Largo	37	10	10	17	22	40	−18	40	
12	Albion	37	9	11	17	34	57	−23	38	
13	Montevideo City Torque	37	9	9	19	38	52	−14	36	
14	Plaza Colonia	37	8	11	18	29	42	−13	35	
15	Rentistas (Note: Rentistas were awarded three points and Cerrito were deducted three points due to Cerrito fielding the ineligible player Franco Martínez during the Torneo Apertura match between both teams.)	37	8	3	26	35	65	−30	30	
16	Cerrito	37	4	8	25	20	72	−52	17	

Source: AUF
Rules for classification: 1) Points, 2) Playoff game, in case two teams are tied for first place.
If there are more than two teams tied in points: 2) Goal difference, 3) Goals for, 4) Head-to-head record, 5) Drawing of lots, 6) Playoff game, in case two teams are still tied for first place.
(C) Champions

== Championship playoff ==
Semi-final		Finals
		Nacional (Aggregate table first place)	—	—	—
Liverpool (Apertura winners)	1	Nacional (Semi-final winners)	—	—	—
Nacional (Clausura winners) (a.e.t.)	4

=== Semi-final ===
30 October 2022
16:00 UTC−3

Liverpool	1–4 (a.e.t.)	Nacional
Vecino 69' (pen.)	Report	Suárez 50', 96'; Gigliotti 107', 113'

Estadio Centenario, Montevideo
Referee: Christian Ferreyra

=== Finals ===
Since Nacional, who had the best record in the aggregate table, won the semi-final, they became champions automatically and the finals were not played. Liverpool became runners-up as the second-placed team in the aggregate table. Both teams qualified for the 2023 Copa Libertadores group stage.

Primera División
2022 Champions
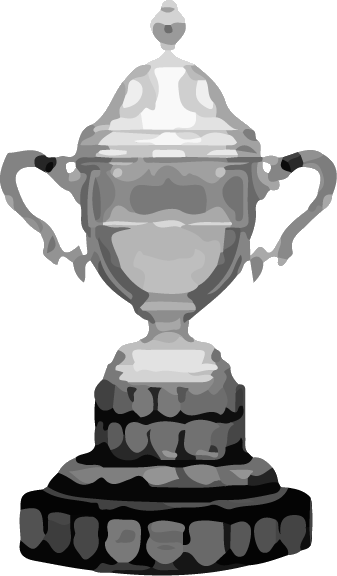

49th title

== Top scorers ==
Rank	Player	Club	Goals
1	(Uruguay) Thiago Borbas	River Plate	18
2	(Uruguay) Thiago Vecino	Liverpool	15
3	(Uruguay) Agustín Rodríguez	Boston River	13
4	(Uruguay) Maximiliano Cantera	Deportivo Maldonado	12
5	(Argentina) Emmanuel Gigliotti	Nacional	11
5	(Uruguay) Alan Medina	Liverpool	11
5	(Uruguay) Mauro Méndez	Montevideo Wanderers	11
5	(Uruguay) José Neris	Albion	11
9	(Uruguay) Enzo Borges	Deportivo Maldonado	10
9	(Uruguay) Franco Fagúndez	Nacional	10

Source: AUF

== Relegation ==
Relegation was determined at the end of the season by computing an average of the number of points earned per game over the two most recent seasons: 2021 and 2022. The three teams with the lowest average at the end of the season were relegated to the Segunda División for the following season.

Pos	Team	2021 Pts	2022 Pts	Total Pts	Total Pld	Avg	Relegation
1	Nacional	59	81	140	67	2.09	
2	Peñarol	60	59	119	67	1.776	
3	Liverpool	42	74	116	67	1.731	
4	Defensor Sporting	—	58	58	37	1.568	
5	River Plate	42	60	102	67	1.522	
6	Danubio	—	56	56	37	1.514	
7	Boston River	36	62	98	67	1.463	
8	Montevideo Wanderers	44	51	95	67	1.418	
9	Deportivo Maldonado	31	63	94	67	1.403	
10	Plaza Colonia	56	35	91	67	1.358	
11	Fénix	40	49	89	67	1.328	
12	Cerro Largo	48	40	88	67	1.313	
13	Montevideo City Torque	50	36	86	67	1.284	
14	Albion (R)	—	38	38	37	1.027	Relegation to Segunda División
15	Rentistas (R)	30	30	60	67	0.896	Relegation to Segunda División
16	Cerrito (R)	40	17	57	67	0.851	Relegation to Segunda División

== Season awards ==
On 14 and 16 December 2022 the AUF announced the winners of the season awards, who were chosen by its Technical Staff based on voting by managers and captains of the 16 Primera División teams as well as a group of local sports journalists. 36 players were nominated for Best Player and the Team of the Season according to their ratings and evaluations by the Technical Staff throughout the season.

Award	Winner	Club
Best Player	(Uruguay) Felipe Carballo	Nacional
Public's Player (Note: Chosen by public voting on the competition's social network accounts.)	(Uruguay) Sergio Rochet	Nacional
Youth Talent	(Uruguay) Thiago Borbas	River Plate
Best Manager	(Uruguay) Pablo Repetto	Nacional
Best Goal	(Uruguay) Pablo Ceppelini (against Albion, Torneo Apertura Round 3)	Peñarol
Best Save	(Uruguay) Sergio Rochet (against Peñarol, Torneo Clausura Round 4)	Nacional
Best Newcomer	(Uruguay) Valentín Adamo	River Plate
Top Scorer	(Uruguay) Thiago Borbas (18 goals in 36 games played)	River Plate
Least beaten goal in regular season	Nacional (20 goals conceded)	
Most minutes on field	(Uruguay) Santiago Silva (Uruguay) Esteban Conde (3,330 minutes in 37 games played)	Boston River; Danubio
Fair Play Award	Danubio	
Best Referee	Andrés Matonte	
Best Assistant Referees	Nicolás Tarán and Martín Soppi	

Team of the Season
Goalkeeper	Defenders	Midfielders	Forwards	Bench
(Uruguay) Sergio Rochet (Nacional)	(Uruguay) Agustín Sant'Anna (Defensor Sporting) (Brazil) Léo Coelho (Nacional) (Uruguay) Federico Pereira (Liverpool) (Uruguay) Camilo Cándido (Nacional)	(Uruguay) Fabricio Díaz (Liverpool) (Uruguay) Felipe Carballo (Nacional) (Uruguay) Maximiliano Cantera (Deportivo Maldonado)	(Uruguay) Franco Fagúndez (Nacional) (Uruguay) Luis Suárez (Nacional) (Uruguay) Thiago Borbas (River Plate)	(Uruguay) Esteban Conde (Danubio) (Uruguay) José Luis Rodríguez (Nacional) (Uruguay) Facundo Mallo (Defensor Sporting) (Uruguay) Lucas de los Santos (Defensor Sporting) (Uruguay) Alan Medina (Liverpool) (Uruguay) Thiago Vecino (Liverpool) (Uruguay) Agustín Rodríguez (Boston River)

== See also ==
- 2022 Copa Uruguay
- 2022 Uruguayan Segunda División season
