= Nico Pandiani =

Uruguayan footballer (born 1994)

Personal information
- Full name: Jorge Nicolás Pandiani Quaglia
- Date of birth: 10 April 1994 (age 32)
- Place of birth: Montevideo, Uruguay
- Height: 1.82 m (5 ft 11 1/2 in)
- Position: Centre back

Team information
- Current team: Navarro
- Number: 21

Youth career
- CE Premià

Senior career*
Years	Team	Apps	(Gls)
2012–2013	Villarreal C		
2013	Atlético Baleares	2	(0)
2013–2014	Miramar Misiones	7	(0)
2014–2015	Marino de Luanco	13	(0)
2015	Canadian		
2015–2016	Masnou	21	(2)
2016–2017	Miramar Misiones	3	(0)
2017–2018	Canadian	22	(0)
2018	Real Avilés	11	(1)
2018–2019	Ħamrun Spartans	1	(0)
2019–2020	Real Avilés	33	(3)
2020–	Navarro	10	(1)
- * Club domestic league appearances and goals as of 13:57, 25 December 2020 (UTC)

Jorge Nicolás Pandiani Quaglia (born 10 April 1994), known as Nicolás or Nico Pandiani, is a Uruguayan footballer who plays for Spanish Tercera División club Navarro. He plays either at right back or as a central defender.

Pandiani's career has alternated between the lower divisions of Spanish football, with Villarreal C, Atlético Baleares, Marino de Luanco, Masnou, Real Avilés and mst recently Navarro, and the Uruguayan professional divisions, with Miramar Misiones, for which he played Primera División football alongside his father, Walter Pandiani, and Canadian. He also spent half a season with Maltese Premier League club Ħamrun Spartans.

== Life and career ==
Pandiani was born in Montevideo, Uruguay, the eldest of three sons of Uruguay international striker Walter Pandiani. The family moved to Spain after Walter established his career there. Nico played in the youth system of CE Premià, and had linked up with the junior teams of Espanyol in 2012–13 pre-season as part of a trial, but then followed his father to Villarreal in August 2012, where he was to play for the club's C team.

In January 2013, the pair moved on to Segunda División B (third tier) club Atlético Baleares, where son as well as father signed a first-team contract. Pandiani made his league debut on 14 April, as a second-half substitute in a 2–0 win away to Levante B, and played once more, starting the penultimate game of the season, a 2–1 defeat away at Sant Andreu, in which his father scored the opening goal.

In late October 2013, Pandiani and Walter returned to Uruguay to join Primera División strugglers Miramar Misiones, where Walter hoped to fulfil his dream of playing professionally in the same team as his son (Atlético Baleares was not a professional team). Pandiani was ineligible to play in the Apertura, and he finally made his professional debut – under his father's captaincy – on the third matchday of the Clausura, on 16 February 2014 away to El Tanque Sisley. Miramar lost 1–0, and Pandiani failed to clear the ball that set up the goal for the hosts. He played once more before relegation was confirmed with five games still to play, and then started the remaining matches to bring his total appearances to seven.

For the 2014–15 season, Pandiani returned to Spain and signed for Segunda B club Marino de Luanco. He made his debut on 20 September as a very late substitute in a 2–2 draw at Atlético Astorga, and made 13 league appearances over the season. His team struggled throughout the campaign, and finished 15 points adrift at the bottom of the division.

Pandiani left Luanco at the end of the season and returned to Uruguay, where he trained with and was reported to have signed for Canadian of the Segunda División. Although expected to start the opening match of the season at the end of October, administrative issues related to international clearance prevented his appearance. A few days later, Spanish club Masnou announced his arrival on a contract to the end of the 2015–16 season. He scored twice from 23 Tercera División appearances, mostly as a starter, before again returning to Uruguay. He re-signed for Miramar Misiones in September 2016, but played only three matches in the 2016 transitional season before signing definitively for Canadian for the 2017 Segunda División season, in which he was a first-team regular.

Pandiani returned to Spanish football in January 2018, signing for Tercera División club Real Avilés until the end of the season. He made 11 appearances before his contract expired, and then joined Ħamrun Spartans of the Maltese Premier League, where he played only once – starting in the 2–1 defeat away to Hibernians – before rejoining Real Avilés a year after first signing for them. Pandiani played regularly as Avilés finished in 14th place, and signed for another year. By mid-season, wages were in arrears, the team was shipping goals and defensive changes were needed. Pandiani was out of favour as well as suffering from a groin injury, and on the last day of the transfer window he moved on to another Tercera club, Navarro. He was only able to play four matches before the season was suspended because of the COVID-19 pandemic.
