= Marcenaro =

Marcenaro is a surname. Notable people with the surname include:

- Carlos Marcenaro (1912–1988), Peruvian middle-distance runner
- Nelson Marcenaro (1952–2021), Uruguayan footballer
- Pietro Marcenaro (born 1946), Italian politician and trade unionist
- Roland Marcenaro (born 1963), Uruguayan football manager and former player
