= 2024 Supercopa Uruguaya =

2024 Supercopa Uruguaya "300 Años de Montevideo"
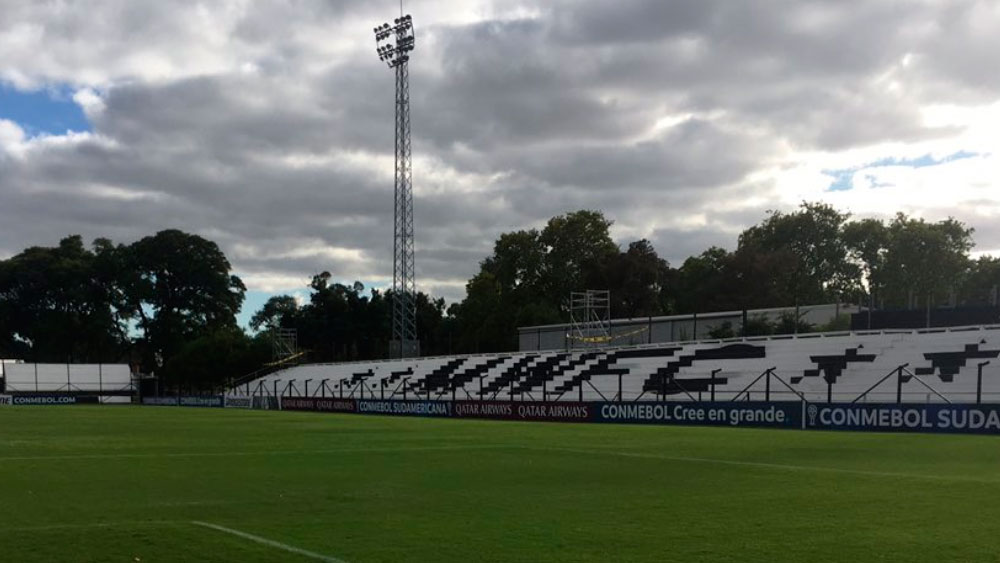
- Parque Alfredo Víctor Viera in Montevideo hosted the match.
- Event: Supercopa Uruguaya
Liverpool	Defensor Sporting
1	0
- Date: 31 January 2024
- Venue: Parque Alfredo Víctor Viera, Montevideo
- Referee: Andrés Matonte

The 2024 Supercopa Uruguaya, officially known as the 2024 Supercopa Uruguaya – 300 Años de Montevideo, was the seventh edition of the Supercopa Uruguaya, Uruguay's football super cup. It was held on 31 January 2024 between the 2023 Primera División champions Liverpool and the 2023 Torneo Intermedio runners-up Defensor Sporting at Parque Alfredo Víctor Viera in Montevideo.

Liverpool defeated Defensor Sporting 1–0 to win their third Supercopa Uruguaya title.

== Teams ==
The Supercopa Uruguaya is usually contested by the champions of the Primera División and the Torneo Intermedio winners of the previous year, however since Liverpool won both tournaments, their rival for the match was the Torneo Intermedio runners-up Defensor Sporting.

Starting from this edition, the competition was expected to also include the Copa Uruguay champions, however, this did not happen since scheduling delays forced the 2023 Copa Uruguay to be concluded in April 2024.

Team	Qualification	Previous appearances (bold indicates winners)
Liverpool	2023 Primera División champions	2 (**2020**, **2023**)
Defensor Sporting	2023 Intermedio runners-up	None

== Details ==
31 January 2024
20:30 UTC−3

Liverpool	1–0	Defensor Sporting
Vecino 79'	Report

Parque Alfredo Víctor Viera, Montevideo
Referee: Andrés Matonte

**Liverpool**	**Defensor Sporting**

GK	21	(Uruguay) Sebastián Lentinelly
RB	24	(Uruguay) Kevin Amaro		(substituted off) 81'
CB	2	(Uruguay) Ignacio Rodríguez
CB	18	(Uruguay) Agustín Cayetano
LB	6	(Paraguay) Miguel Samudio
CM	7	(Uruguay) Lucas Lemos
CM	8	(Uruguay) Martín Barrios
AM	23	(Uruguay) Alex Vázquez	(yellow card) 63'	(substituted off) 67'
RW	11	(Uruguay) Matías Ocampo		(substituted off) 90+4'
LW	20	(Uruguay) Hebert Vergara		(substituted off) 46'
CF	10	(Uruguay) Renzo Machado		(substituted off) 67'
Substitutes:
GK	1	(Uruguay) Gastón Guruceaga
DF	19	(Uruguay) Jean Rosso		(substituted in) 81'
DF	32	(Uruguay) Francisco Bregante
DF	35	(Uruguay) Álvaro Gracés		(substituted in) 90+4'
MF	5	(Uruguay) Matías Silva
MF	31	(Uruguay) Lucas Wasilewsky		(substituted in) 67'
FW	9	(Uruguay) Thiago Vecino		(substituted in) 67'
FW	14	(Uruguay) Diego García
FW	16	(Uruguay) Nahuel Soria
FW	17	(Uruguay) Franco Nicola		(substituted in) 46'
Manager:
(Uruguay) Emiliano Alfaro

GK	12	(Uruguay) Kevin Dawson
RB	7	(Uruguay) Nicolás Rodríguez
CB	3	(Uruguay) Guillermo de los Santos
LB	15	(Uruguay) Juan Viacava	(yellow card) 22'	(substituted off) 81'
DM	34	(Peru) Alfonso Barco
DM	5	(Uruguay) Facundo Bernal	(yellow card) 90+6'
CM	8	(Uruguay) Fernando Elizari		(substituted off) 85'
CM	21	(Uruguay) Joaquín Valiente
RW	16	(Uruguay) José Álvarez
LW	11	(Uruguay) Lucas Agazzi		(substituted off) 71'
CF	9	(Uruguay) Octavio Rivero
Substitutes:
GK	23	(Uruguay) Bruno Simone
DF	4	(Uruguay) Rodrigo Cabrera
DF	14	(Argentina) Renzo Giampaoli
MF	6	(Uruguay) Mauricio Amaro
MF	17	(Uruguay) Francisco Barrios
MF	18	(Uruguay) Agustín Soria
MF	26	(Uruguay) Nicolás Wunsch
FW	13	(Uruguay) Augusto Cambón		(substituted in) 85'
FW	19	(Uruguay) Pablo Viudez	(yellow card) 86'	(substituted in) 81'
FW	24	(Uruguay) Brian Mansilla		(substituted in) 71'
Manager:
(Uruguay) Martín Varini

Assistant referees:
Agustín Berisso
Marcelo Alonso
Fourth official:
Pablo Giménez
Video assistant referee:
Jonathan Fuentes
Assistant video assistant referee:
Héctor Bergaló

**Match rules**

- 90 minutes.
- 30 minutes of extra time if necessary.
- Penalty shoot-out if scores still level.
- Ten named substitutes.
- Maximum of five substitutions.
