= 2023 Supercopa Uruguaya =

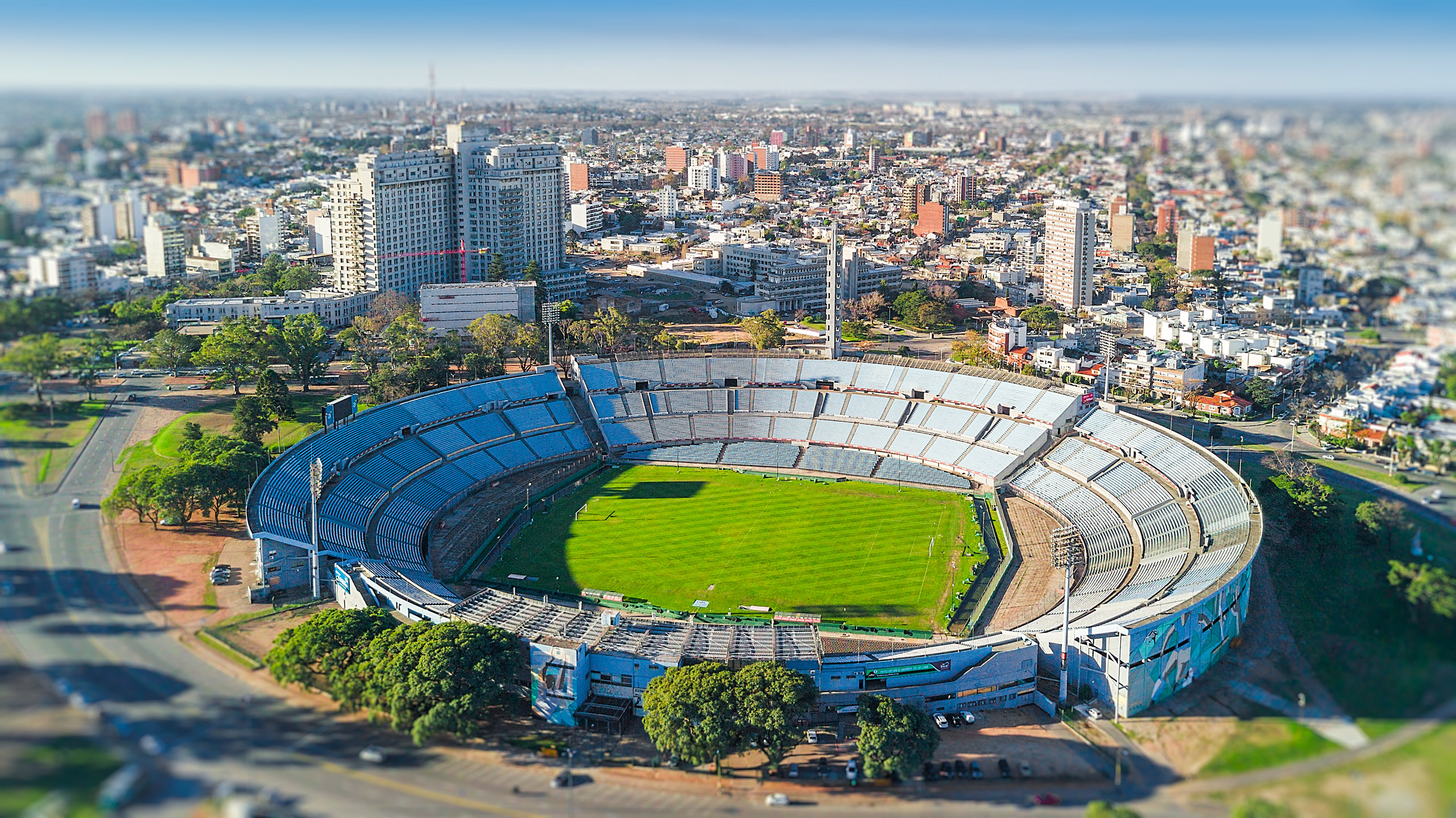
- Estadio Centenario hosted the match.
Liverpool	Nacional
1	0
- Date: 29 January 2023
- Venue: Estadio Centenario, Montevideo
- Referee: Mathias de Armas

The 2023 Supercopa Uruguaya was the sixth edition of the Supercopa Uruguaya, Uruguay's football super cup. It was held on 29 January 2023 between the 2022 Primera División champions Nacional and the 2022 Torneo Intermedio runners-up Liverpool at Estadio Centenario in Montevideo.

Liverpool were the winners, beating Nacional 1–0 to claim their second Supercopa Uruguaya title.

== Teams ==
The Supercopa Uruguaya is usually contested by the champions of the Primera División and the Torneo Intermedio winners of the previous year, however since Nacional won both tournaments, their rival for the match were the Torneo Intermedio runners-up Liverpool.

Both teams previously faced each other in a Supercopa Uruguaya match in 2020, in which Liverpool won the title with a 4–2 win after extra time.

Team	Qualification	Previous appearances (bold indicates winners)
Nacional	2022 Primera División champions	4 (2018, **2019**, 2020, **2021**)
Liverpool	2022 Intermedio runners-up	1 (**2020**)

== Details ==
29 January 2023
21:00 UTC−3

Liverpool	1–0	Nacional
Nápoli 4'	Report

Estadio Centenario, Montevideo
Referee: Mathias de Armas

**Liverpool**	**Nacional**

GK	21	(Uruguay) Sebastián Lentinelly
RB	15	(Uruguay) Gastón Martirena
CB	2	(Uruguay) Ignacio Rodríguez	(yellow card) 75'
CB	4	(Uruguay) Gonzalo Pérez
LB	11	(Paraguay) Miguel Samudio
DM	5	(Uruguay) Matías Silva
RM	26	(Uruguay) Lucas Lemos	(yellow card) 33' (yellow-red card) 36'
CM	8	(Uruguay) Gonzalo Nápoli
LM	10	(Uruguay) Alan Medina	(substituted off) 65'
CF	9	(Uruguay) Maicol Cabrera	(substituted off) 65'
CF	14	(Uruguay) Rodrigo Rivero	(substituted off) 65'
Substitutes:
GK	1	(Uruguay) Sebastián Britos
DF	3	(Uruguay) Juan Manuel Izquierdo	(substituted on) 65'
DF	22	(Uruguay) Gervasio Olivera
DF	24	(Uruguay) Kevin Amaro
MF	27	(Uruguay) Yordi López
MF	30	(Uruguay) Matías Zunino	(substituted on) 65'	(yellow card) 68'
FW	7	(Uruguay) Renzo Machado	(substituted on) 65'
FW	13	(Uruguay) Leandro Otormín
FW	17	(Uruguay) Nahuel Soria
FW	20	(Uruguay) Facundo Trinidad
Manager:
(Uruguay) Jorge Bava

GK	1	(Uruguay) Sergio Rochet
RB	16	(Uruguay) Leandro Lozano	(substituted off) 46'
CB	18	(Argentina) Fabián Noguera
CB	23	(Uruguay) Diego Polenta
LB	13	(Uruguay) Christian Almeida	(substituted off) 46'
DM	15	(Uruguay) Diego Rodríguez
DM	22	(Uruguay) Diego Zabala	(yellow card) 22'	(substituted off) 46'
RM	20	(Uruguay) Gastón Pereiro	(substituted off) 72'
LM	6	(Uruguay) Camilo Cándido	(yellow card) 90+3'
AM	10	(Uruguay) Franco Fagúndez
CF	9	(Argentina) Emmanuel Gigliotti
Substitutes:
GK	32	(Uruguay) Salvador Ichazo
DF	2	(Colombia) Daniel Bocanegra
DF	3	(Uruguay) Maximiliano Perg
DF	14	(Uruguay) Marcos Montiel
MF	5	(Uruguay) Yonatan Rodríguez
MF	19	(Uruguay) Alfonso Trezza	(substituted on) 72'
MF	24	(Uruguay) Manuel Monzeglio
MF	27	(Uruguay) Lucas Morales	(substituted on) 46'
FW	7	(Uruguay) Federico Martínez	(substituted on) 46'
FW	11	(Uruguay) Ignacio Ramírez	(substituted on) 46'
Manager:
(Argentina) Ricardo Zielinski

Assistant referees:
Santiago Fernández
Sebastián Schröeder
Fourth official:
Pablo Giménez
Video assistant referee:
Andrés Cunha
Assistant video assistant referees:
Jonhatan Fuentes
Javier Irazoqui

**Match rules**

- 90 minutes.
- 30 minutes of extra time if necessary.
- Penalty shoot-out if scores still level.
- Ten named substitutes.
- Maximum of five substitutions.
