= Facundo Trinidad =

Uruguayan footballer (born 2002)

Personal information
- Full name: Facundo Fabián Trinidad Carballo
- Date of birth: 14 April 2002 (age 24)
- Place of birth: Montevideo, Uruguay
- Height: 1.69 m (5 ft 7 in)
- Position: Winger

Team information
- Current team: Juventud
- Number: 22

Youth career
- 2015–2020: Liverpool Montevideo

Senior career*
Years	Team	Apps	(Gls)
2020–	Liverpool Montevideo	10	(0)
2024–	→ Juventud (loan)	16	(1)
- * Club domestic league appearances and goals as of 15 September 2024

Facundo Fabián Trinidad Carballo (born 14 April 2002) is a Uruguayan professional footballer who plays as a winger for Juventud on loan from Liverpool Montevideo.

== Career ==
Trinidad joined youth academy of Liverpool Montevideo in 2015. He was promoted to senior team in 2020 season and made his professional debut on 8 August 2020 against Rentistas. He came on as an 86th-minute substitute for Bruno Correa as the match ended in a 1–1 draw.

== Personal life ==
Trinidad is the nephew of Uruguayan international footballers Carlos Sánchez and Nicolás de la Cruz.

== Career statistics ==
As of 30 January 2023

Appearances and goals by club, season and competition
Club	Season	League			Cup		Continental		Other		Total	
Club	Season	Division	Apps	Goals	Apps	Goals	Apps	Goals	Apps	Goals	Apps	Goals
Liverpool Montevideo	2020	Uruguayan Primera División	8	0	—		0	0	0	0	8	0
Liverpool Montevideo	2021	Uruguayan Primera División	0	0	—		0	0	—		0	0
Liverpool Montevideo	2022	Uruguayan Primera División	2	0	3	0	0	0	0	0	5	0
Liverpool Montevideo	2023	Uruguayan Primera División	0	0	0	0	0	0	0	0	0	0
Career total			10	0	3	0	0	0	0	0	13	0

== Honours ==
Liverpool Montevideo

- Supercopa Uruguaya: 2023
