= Gastón Guruceaga =

Gastón Guruceaga may refer to:

- Gastón Guruceaga (footballer, born 1990), Argentine defender
- Gastón Guruceaga (footballer, born 1995), Uruguayan goalkeeper
