= Daniel López (footballer, born 1992) =

Spanish footballer

Dani López
Personal information
- Full name: Daniel López Albés
- Date of birth: 31 March 1992 (age 34)
- Place of birth: Barcelona, Spain
- Height: 1.80 m (5 ft 11 in)
- Position: Midfielder

Youth career
- 2000–2007: Barcelona
- Jàbac Terrassa
- Masnou

Senior career*
Years	Team	Apps	(Gls)
2011–2012	Masnou	36	(2)
2012–2013	Fuenlabrada	27	(1)
2013–2016	Doxa	59	(3)
2014	→ Almería B (loan)	9	(1)
2016–2019	Viitorul	30	(0)
- * Club domestic league appearances and goals as of 12 July 2019

Daniel 'Dani' López Albés (born 31 March 1992) is a Spanish professional footballer who plays as a midfielder.

== Club career ==
Born in Barcelona, Catalonia, López made his senior debut with lowly CD Masnou in the 2010–11 season, in the Tercera División. In July 2012, he joined Segunda División B club CF Fuenlabrada.

López moved abroad the following summer, signing for Doxa Katokopias FC in Cyprus. On 3 February 2014 he returned to his homeland, agreeing to a five-month loan at third-tier UD Almería B.

== Honours ==
Viitorul

- Liga I: 2016–17
- Cupa României: 2018–19
