= Juan Izquierdo =

Uruguayan footballer (1997–2024)

- Izquierdo with Nacional in 2024

Personal information
- Full name: Juan Manuel Izquierdo Viana
- Date of birth: 4 July 1997
- Place of birth: Montevideo, Uruguay
- Date of death: 27 August 2024 (aged 27)
- Place of death: São Paulo, Brazil
- Height: 1.86 m (6 ft 1 in)
- Position: Centre-back

Youth career
- Liverpool Montevideo
- Cerro

Senior career*
Years	Team	Apps	(Gls)
2018	Cerro	28	(1)
2019	Peñarol	5	(0)
2020	Montevideo Wanderers	16	(2)
2021	Atlético San Luis	4	(0)
2021	Montevideo Wanderers	14	(0)
2022	Nacional	1	(0)
2023	Liverpool Montevideo	31	(3)
2024	Nacional	16	(1)
Total		115	(7)
- * Club domestic league appearances and goals

Juan Manuel Izquierdo Viana (4 July 1997 – 27 August 2024) was a Uruguayan professional footballer who played as a centre-back.

He made 111 Uruguayan Primera División appearances for Cerro, Peñarol, Montevideo Wanderers, Liverpool and Nacional, winning the league in 2022 and 2023 for the last two clubs, respectively. He also briefly played in Mexico's Liga MX for Atlético San Luis in 2021.

Izquierdo died at age 27, having collapsed due to cardiac arrhythmia during a Copa Libertadores match at São Paulo.

== Career ==
Born in Montevideo on 4 July 1997, Izquierdo was raised in the Nuevo París neighbourhood. He began playing in the youth ranks of Liverpool Montevideo, before moving to Cerro.

Izquierdo made his professional debut for Cerro on 20 February 2018, starting in a goalless draw away to Sport Rosario of Peru in the Copa Sudamericana, under manager Fernando Correa. Five days later he made his Uruguayan Primera División debut as a 41st-minute substitute for Jonathan Barboza in a 4–0 loss away to Nacional. He played 28 games in his first season and scored once in a 5–2 home win over Progresso on 25 August.

In February 2019, Izquierdo transferred to Peñarol, alongside Cerro teammate Luis Acevedo. He played just five times for the club managed by Diego López, who finished as league runners-up to Uruguayan Clásico rivals Nacional.

Izquierdo signed for Montevideo Wanderers in January 2020. On 30 November, he scored his only goals for the "Bohemians" in a 3–2 win away to Liverpool. His team reached the Torneo Intermedio final, losing in a penalty shootout to Nacional, and finished the league season in 5th and qualifying for the Copa Libertadores.

Izquierdo moved abroad for the first time in February 2021, joining Atlético San Luis of the Mexican Liga MX. He was signed by a Uruguayan manager, Leonel Rocca. Having made only four appearances, and confronted fans in the stands in April, he returned to Wanderers in August. On his return, he became a regular fixture in the team, helping them to third place in the 2021 Torneo Clausura and another continental qualification.

Izquierdo moved to Nacional for 2022, playing just 13 minutes as a substitute against Rentistas on 13 February in a league-winning season due to a tibia stress fracture. Though his opportunities at the club were limited, he spoke of the positive impact of sharing a club with Luis Suárez, a player he had admired as a child.

For 2023, Izquierdo moved to Liverpool in the same league. On 29 January, he debuted as a 66th-minute substitute in a 1–0 win over his previous club in the 2023 Supercopa Uruguaya. With the club, he competed in the Copa Libertadores for the first time. He scored three goals in 31 games as they won the league for the first time in their history of over a century, and was considered one of Liverpool's best players in the campaign. He had made a promise to his dying grandfather to win the title for the club. He became one of few players to win Uruguay's league title in consecutive years with different clubs.

After not renewing his contract, he was brought back to Nacional by manager Álvaro Recoba in January 2024 to deal with a shortage of defenders. He scored his only goal for the club and last of seven in his life on 3 May 2024 in a 4–2 home win over Racing Club de Montevideo.

== Death ==
On 22 August 2024, Izquierdo collapsed on the pitch and was rushed to the Albert Einstein Hospital in São Paulo with a case of cardiac arrhythmia during the second half of the match against São Paulo FC in the round of 16 of the Copa Libertadores. Uruguay's first and second division football leagues were postponed on the weekend over concerns for his health. Sāo Paulo FC players wore a jersey in support before the team's 2–1 Campeonato Brasileiro Série A win against Vitória on 25 August.

He died on 27 August. The cause of death was "cardiorespiratory arrest associated with his cardiac arrhythmia". Izquierdo was not known to have a heart condition until his collapse.

According to Izquierdo's mother, the hospital staff said that her son had a virus that had entered his heart and caused the cardiac arrhythmia due to the physical exertion of the match. She said that he had no signs of infection except for swollen lymph nodes.

Izquierdo was married and had two children, one of whom was born ten days before his death.

=== Reactions ===
Nacional posted a statement on social media saying Izquierdo's death is felt "with the deepest sorrow and shock in our hearts" and "Nacional are in grief for their irreplaceable loss." Sāo Paulo FC said they were deeply saddened by the news, calling it a "sad day for football".

Izquierdo's death was mourned by Gianni Infantino, the president of FIFA. Alejandro Domínguez, the president of CONMEBOL, also extended his condolences to Izquierdo's family and friends and said that "South American football is in mourning". Other federations, including Uruguay, Brazil, and Argentina, also expressed their condolences.

On 29 August 2024, Vasco da Gama player Puma Rodríguez wore a shirt with the name Izquierdo and scored a goal in a 2–1 victory over Athletico Paranaense in the Campeonato Brasileiro Série A.

== Honours ==
Nacional

- Uruguayan Primera División: 2022

Liverpool

- Uruguayan Primera División: 2023
- Supercopa Uruguaya: 2023

== See also ==
- List of association footballers who died after on-field incidents
