= 2020 Supercopa Uruguaya =

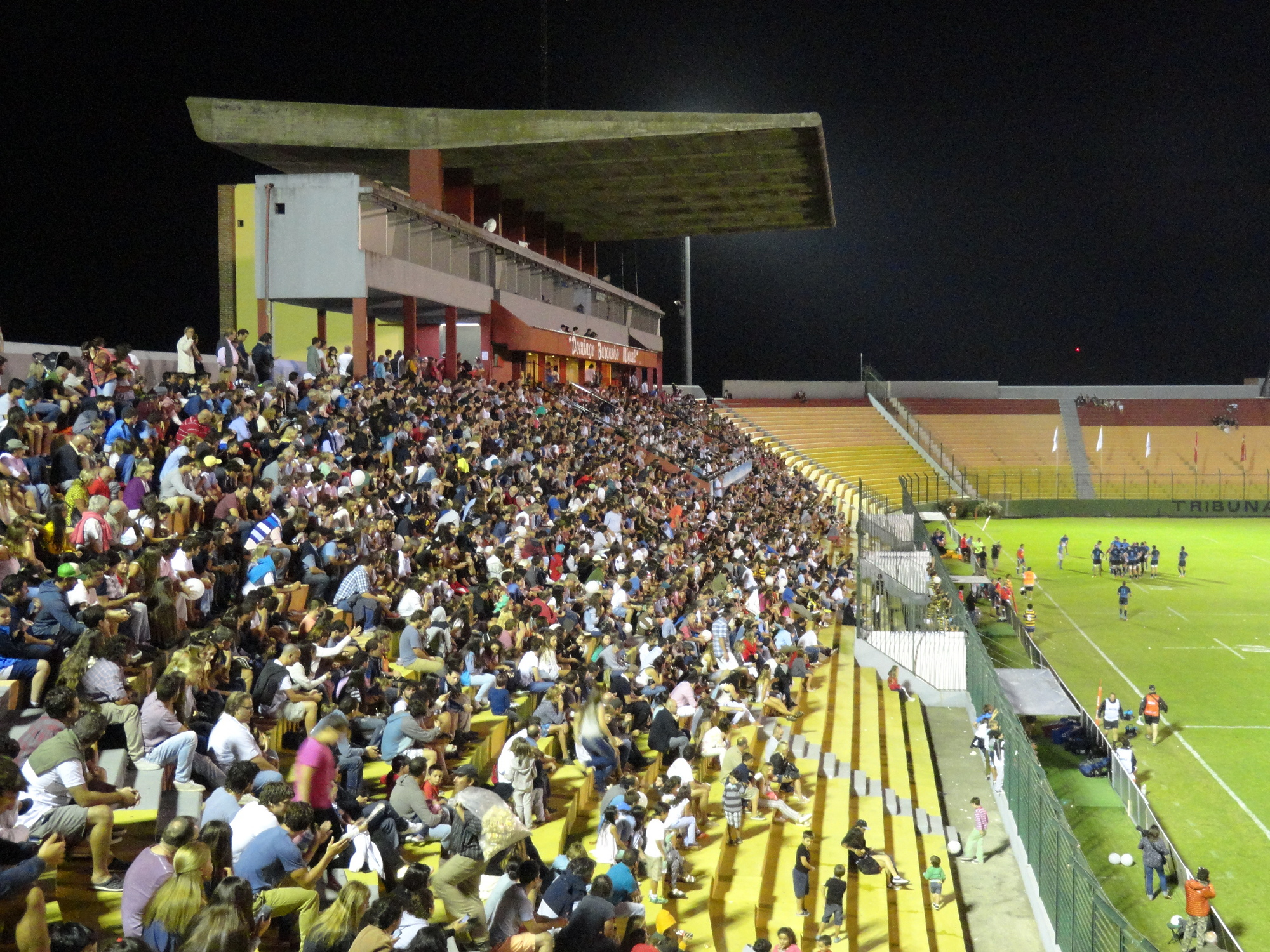
- Estadio Domingo Burgueño was the venue for the match.
- Event: Supercopa Uruguaya
Liverpool	Nacional
4	2
- After extra time
- Date: 1 February 2020
- Venue: Estadio Domingo Burgueño, Maldonado
- Referee: Gustavo Tejera

The 2020 Supercopa Uruguaya was the third edition of the Supercopa Uruguaya, Uruguay's football super cup. It was held on 1 February 2020 between 2019 Torneo Intermedio winners Liverpool and 2019 Primera División champions Nacional.

The match was played at Estadio Domingo Burgueño in Maldonado, being this the first time the match was played away from Estadio Centenario in Montevideo due to it undergoing remodeling works.

Liverpool defeated Nacional by a 4–2 score after extra time in order to claim their first Supercopa title.

== Teams ==
Team	Qualification	Previous appearances (bold indicates winners)
Liverpool	2019 Intermedio winners	None
Nacional	2019 Primera División champions	2 (2018, **2019**)

== Match details ==
1 February 2020
20:30 UTC−3

Liverpool	4–2 (a.e.t.)	Nacional
Dávila 4'; Medina 57'; Correa 106'; Díaz 111'	Report	Carballo 79'; Castro 90+5'

Estadio Domingo Burgueño, Maldonado
Referee: Gustavo Tejera

**Liverpool**	**Nacional**

GK	25	(Argentina) Andrés Mehring
RB	6	(Uruguay) Federico Pereira	(yellow card) 31'	(substituted off) 73'
CB	5	(Uruguay) Franco Romero
CB	23	(Uruguay) Ernesto Goñi
LB	3	(Uruguay) Camilo Cándido	(yellow card) 27'
RM	10	(Uruguay) Alan Medina	(yellow card) 30'	(substituted off) 65'
CM	13	(Uruguay) Hernán Figueredo
CM	29	(Uruguay) Fabricio Díaz	(yellow card) 112'
CM	27	(Uruguay) Agustín Ocampo	(yellow card) 88'
LM	20	(Uruguay) Martín Correa
FW	17	(Uruguay) Agustín Dávila	(substituted off) 78'
Substitutes:
GK	12	(Uruguay) Santiago Amorín
DF	16	(Uruguay) Maximiliano Pereira	(substituted on) 73'
MF	18	(Uruguay) Guillermo Firpo	(substituted on) 78'
MF	28	(Uruguay) Alex Vázquez
FW	11	(Uruguay) Emiliano Alfaro
FW	15	(Uruguay) Gustavo Viera	(substituted on) 65'	(yellow card) 82'
FW	22	(Argentina) Joel Acosta
Manager:
(Uruguay) Román Cuello

GK	12	(Panama) Luis Mejía
RB	26	(Uruguay) Armando Méndez
CB	21	(Uruguay) Guzmán Corujo
CB	24	(Paraguay) Miguel Jacquet	(substituted off) 77'
LB	15	(Uruguay) Ayrton Cougo	(yellow card) 59'
RM	27	(Uruguay) Joaquín Trasante	(substituted off) 46'
CM	20	(Uruguay) Felipe Carballo	(yellow card) 47'
CM	28	(Uruguay) Pablo García	(substituted off) 57'
LM	11	(Uruguay) Gonzalo Castro
AM	7	(Uruguay) Brian Ocampo	(yellow card) 24'
FW	9	(Argentina) Gonzalo Bergessio	(yellow card) 80'
Substitutes:
GK	1	(Uruguay) Sergio Rochet
DF	3	(Uruguay) Renzo Orihuela
DF	4	(Uruguay) Lautaro Pertusatti
MF	5	(Argentina) Claudio Yacob	(substituted on) 46'
MF	19	(Uruguay) Alfonso Trezza
FW	18	(Uruguay) Sebastián Fernández	(substituted on) 57'
FW	29	(Uruguay) Thiago Vecino	(substituted on) 77'
Manager:
(Uruguay) Gustavo Munúa

Assistant referees:
Richard Trinidad
Javier Irazoqui
Fourth official:
Diego Riveiro

**Match rules**

- 90 minutes
- 30 minutes of extra time if necessary
- Penalty shoot-out if scores still level
- Seven named substitutes
- Maximum of three substitutions
