= Alan Silva (disambiguation) =

Alan Silva is an American musician.

Alan Silva may also refer to:

- Alan Osório da Costa Silva (born 1979), Brazilian footballer
- Alan Medina Silva (born 1998), Uruguayan footballer

== See also ==
- Alan Silvia, American politician
- Alain Silver, American filmmaker
