= Amorin =

Amorin is a surname of Galician origin. Notable people with the surname include:

- Rubén Amorín (1927–2014), Uruguayan football player and coach
- Santiago Amorín (born 1994), Uruguayan footballer
- Tavio Amorin (1958–1992), Togolese politician
