= Kevin Amaro =

Uruguayan association footballer (born 2004)

Personal information
- Full name: Kevin Johan Amaro Viega
- Date of birth: 3 March 2004 (age 22)
- Place of birth: Montevideo, Uruguay
- Height: 1.77 m (5 ft 10 in)
- Positions: Right-back; right winger

Team information
- Current team: Genk
- Number: 20

Youth career
- Liverpool Montevideo

Senior career*
Years	Team	Apps	(Gls)
2022–2026	Liverpool Montevideo	88	(2)
2026–	Genk	6	(0)

International career^{‡}
2025–	Uruguay	3	(0)
- * Club domestic league appearances and goals as of 25 October 2026 ‡ National team caps and goals as of 13 October 2025

Kevin Johan Amaro Viega (born 3 March 2004) is a Uruguayan professional footballer who plays as a right-back or right winger for Belgian Pro League club Genk and the Uruguay national team.

== Club career ==
Amaro is a youth academy graduate of Liverpool Montevideo. He signed his first professional contract with the club in July 2022. He made his professional debut for the club on 31 August 2022 in a 2–1 cup win against Central Español.

On 18 August 2026, Amaro joined Belgian club Genk on a five-year contract.

== International career ==
In September 2025, Uruguay national team head coach Marcelo Bielsa included Amaro in the squad for the first time. He made his debut for Uruguay on 9 September as a 71st-minute substitute for Brian Rodríguez in a goalless draw against Chile.

== Personal life ==
Amaro considers Kyle Walker his footballing role model. Amaro is the elder brother of footballer Mauricio Amaro.

== Career statistics ==
=== Club ===
As of match played 25 October 2026

Appearances and goals by club, season and competition
Club	Season	League			Cup (Note: Includes Copa Uruguay)		Continental		Other		Total	
Club	Season	Division	Apps	Goals	Apps	Goals	Apps	Goals	Apps	Goals	Apps	Goals
Liverpool Montevideo	2022	Liga AUF Uruguaya	2	0	3	0	—		0	0	5	0
Liverpool Montevideo	2023	Liga AUF Uruguaya	1	0	3	0	0	0	0	0	4	0
Liverpool Montevideo	2024	Liga AUF Uruguaya	35	1	—		6 (Note: Appearances in Copa Libertadores)	0	1 (Note: Appearance in Supercopa Uruguaya)	0	42	1
Liverpool Montevideo	2025	Liga AUF Uruguaya	33	1	1	0	—		1 (Note: Appearance in championship playoffs)	0	35	1
Liverpool Montevideo	2026	Liga AUF Uruguaya	17	0	0	0	0	0	—		17	0
Liverpool Montevideo	Total		88	2	7	0	6	0	2	0	103	2
Genk	2026–27	Belgian Pro League	6	0	1	0	—		—		7	0
Career total			94	2	8	0	6	0	2	0	110	2

=== International ===
As of match played 13 October 2025

Appearances and goals by national team and year
National team	Year	Apps	Goals
Uruguay	2025	3	0
Total		3	0

== Honours ==
Liverpool Montevideo

- Uruguayan Primera División: 2023
- Supercopa Uruguaya: 2023, 2024

Individual

- Liga AUF Uruguaya team of the year: 2025
