= Rodolfo Neme =

Uruguayan footballer and manager (born 1964)

Personal information
- Full name: Julio Rodolfo Neme Moreno
- Date of birth: 18 September 1964 (age 62)
- Place of birth: Montevideo, Uruguay

Senior career*
| Years | Team | Apps | (Gls) |
| 1979–1980 | Sud América | | |
| 1981–1982 | Rampla Juniors | | |
| 1983–1987 | Bella Vista | | |
| 1988 | Liverpool Montevideo | | |
| 1989–1991 | Peñarol Durazno | | |

Managerial career
- 1993–1996: Bella Vista (youth)
- 1997: Miramar Misiones (assistant)
- 1998: Avenida
- 1999: Florida
- 2000: Quilmes de Florida
- 2001–2004: Bella Vista (youth)
- 2005: Montevideo Wanderers (youth)
- 2006–2007: Defensor Sporting (assistant)
- 2008–2009: Bella Vista (youth)
- 2010: Nacional Montevideo (youth)
- 2012–2013: Universidad Católica (assistant)
- 2014–2015: Universidad de Chile (assistant)
- 2016–2017: Nacional Montevideo (assistant)
- 2019: Al Ahly (assistant)
- 2020: Deportes Linares
- 2022: Huracán Paso de la Arena
- 2022: Rentistas
- * Club domestic league appearances and goals

Julio Rodolfo Neme Moreno (born 18 September 1964) is a Uruguayan football manager and former player.

== Playing career ==
Born in Montevideo, Neme played for Sud América, Rampla Juniors, Bella Vista, Liverpool Montevideo and Peñarol Durazno as a senior. He retired in 1991, aged 27.

== Coaching career ==
Shortly after retiring, Neme took up coaching and began his career in 1992 with college side Club Sirio Maeso. His first managerial experience occurred in 1998, while in charge of Avenida.

After managing Florida and Quilmes de Florida, Neme was in charge of the youth sides of Bella Vista and Montevideo Wanderers. He was the assistant manager of Defensor Sporting between 2006 and 2007, and later returned to Bella Vista.

In 2012, Neme began working with Martín Lasarte, being his assistant at Universidad Católica. He continued working with Lasarte in the following years, at Universidad de Chile, Nacional Montevideo and Al Ahly.

On 8 January 2020, Neme was appointed manager of Deportes Linares in the Chilean Segunda División Profesional. He resigned on 1 June, and subsequently returned to his home country.

On 11 March 2022, Neme was named in charge of Huracán del Paso de la Arena, but was sacked on 25 July. On 8 August 2022, he replaced Leonel Rocco at the helm of Rentistas.
