= Esteban Conde =

Uruguayan footballer (born 1983)

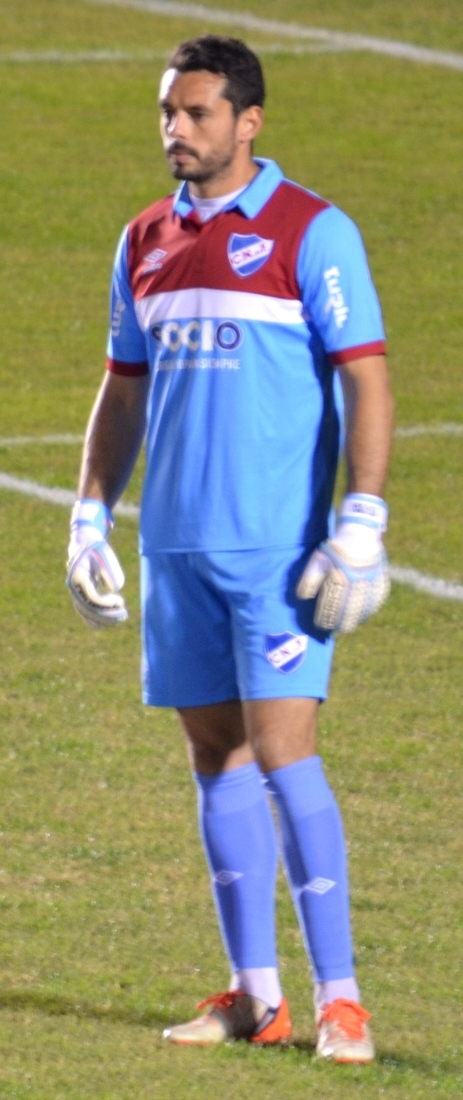
- Conde playing for Nacional in 2016

Personal information
- Full name: Néstor Esteban Conde Quintana
- Date of birth: 4 March 1983 (age 43)
- Place of birth: Young, Uruguay
- Height: 1.86 m (6 ft 1 in)
- Position: Goalkeeper

Youth career
- 2001–2003: Rentistas

Senior career*
Years	Team	Apps	(Gls)
2003–2004	Rentistas	46	(0)
2005–2009	Danubio	133	(6)
2010–2013	Universidad de Chile	19	(0)
2012–2013	→ Atlético Rafaela (loan)	2	(0)
2013–2015	Atlético Rafaela	67	(0)
2015–2019	Nacional	111	(0)
2019–2020	Banfield	10	(0)
2020	Atenas	19	(0)
2021–2022	Danubio	59	(0)

International career
2017	Uruguay	1	(0)

Managerial career
- 2023: Danubio
- * Club domestic league appearances and goals

Esteban Néstor Conde Quintana (Spanish pronunciation: [esˈteβaŋ ˈkonde]; born 4 March 1983) is a Uruguayan football manager and former player who plays as a goalkeeper.

Conde is supporter of Nacional; going to the games of that club at Estadio Parque Central, when he played at Danubio and had free time.

== Club career ==
=== Danubio ===
Conde began his career with Rentistas in 2003, where he achieved the promotion to Uruguayan top level division. After playing his first season in the elite division, he was transferred to Uruguayan giants Danubio, in where Esteban earned the 2006–07 Primera División title and scored six goals all via penalty kick, being a key player in the scheme of Gustavo Matosas, the coach of the club.

Thanks to the league title achieved, he made 2008 Copa Libertadores group stage debut against Lanús in Buenos Aires, conceding three goals in a 3–1 away defeat, receiving the same season a call–up of Óscar Tabárez to the Uruguay national team prior to a qualifier match for the 2010 FIFA World Cup match against Peru.

=== Universidad de Chile ===
On 23 December 2009, Conde signed a four–year contract with Chilean Primera División powerhouse club Universidad de Chile, conscious of that he will be Miguel Pinto's back–up, before of the appointment of the coach Gerardo Pelusso. He made his official debut in a 5–1 win over Cobresal in Coquimbo for the league tournament, making his club's international debut against Caracas for the Copa Libertadores, in where with a goal of his compatriot Juan Manuel Olivera, his club won the match 1–0. On 8 April 2012, he played his most important game in the club in a 2–2 away draw for the international contest against Flamengo at Rio de Janeiro. After of his very well performance at Brazil, he failed to play against Colo-Colo for the Chilean football derby, because the keeper Miguel Pinto, the Chilean national team's player, was fully recovered of his long–time injury, relegating him to the bench. However, Pelusso selected to Esteban as the Copa Chile first choice keeper, playing two games against Lota Schwager at Coronel and Santiago.

After of the departure of Pinto to Mexican club Atlas, the club's corporation Azul Azul, informed that Conde will be the first keeper for the 2011 season, despite the arrival of Nery Veloso and also of Carlos Alfaro, who would be the back–up keepers of Conde. However, on 24 January, Jhonny Herrera returned to the club after five years, playing at Audax Italiano the last season, in where achieved the recognition of be Chilean Primera División's best keeper of the season. Despite Herrera's return, the things for Esteban were somewhat favorable, because Unión San Felipe signed to Nery Veloso and the third–choice keeper Carlos Alfaro made a poor South American Youth Championship at Peru under the coach César Vaccia. That left to the charrua as the second–choice keeper for the season. His first game in the season was recently on 30 June for the first week of the Torneo de Clausura, playing in a 3–0 home win over Deportes La Serena, failing to play in the Torneo de Apertura, because Jorge Sampaoli, not considered him during the season.

On 28 June 2012, through an interview with El Gráfico, he declared that his opportunities are over after Gerardo Pelusso's departure in late 2010, then with the arrival of Jorge Sampaoli and of the keeper Jhonny Herrera, saying also that he won't continue at the club. After of Universidad de Chile's success at the Torneo de Apertura, the Azul Azul corporation reported that Raúl Ruidíaz and he will be free agents.

=== Atlético de Rafaela ===
On 30 July 2012, was reported that he joined on loan to Primera División Argentina club Atlético de Rafaela.

=== Later career ===
Conde joined Nacional in 2015, and was a regular starter before returning to Argentina in 2019, with Banfield. In August 2020, he returned to his home country after signing for Atenas in Segunda División.

In 2021, Conde returned to his former club Danubio. A regular starter, he helped in their promotion back to the top tier before retiring in 2022, aged 39.

== International career ==
Conde made his senior debut in a friendly 3–1 loss to the Republic of Ireland on 4 June 2017.

== Managerial career ==
Immediately after retiring, Conde was named manager of Danubio for the 2023 season on 14 November 2022, replacing Jorge Fossati.

== Career statistics ==
=== Club ===
Club	Season	League		Cup		International		Total	
Club	Season	Apps	Goals	Apps	Goals	Apps	Goals	Apps	Goals
Rentistas	2003	12	0	3	0	–	–	15	0
Rentistas	2004	34	0	–	–	–	–	34	0
Rentistas	Total	46	0	3	0	–	–	49	0
Danubio	2005	5	0	0	0	–	–	5	0
Danubio	2005–06	26	0	5	0	1	0	32	0
Danubio	2006–07	30	0	6	0	2	0	38	0
Danubio	2007–08	28	0	5	0	8	0	41	0
Danubio	2008–09	29	2	1	0	–	–	30	2
Danubio	2009–10	15	4	–	–	–	–	15	4
Danubio	Total	133	6	17	0	11	0	161	6
Universidad de Chile	2010	17	0	2	0	4	0	23	0
Universidad de Chile	2011	2	0	1	0	0	0	3	0
Universidad de Chile	2012	0	0	0	0	0	0	0	0
Universidad de Chile	Total	19	0	3	0	4	0	26	0
Career Total		198	6	23	0	15	0	236	6

== Honours ==
=== Club ===
Danubio

- Uruguayan Primera División (1): 2006–07

Universidad de Chile

- Primera División de Chile (2): 2011 Apertura, 2011–C
- Copa Sudamericana (1): 2011
