= Walter Pandiani =

Uruguayan footballer and manager (born 1976)

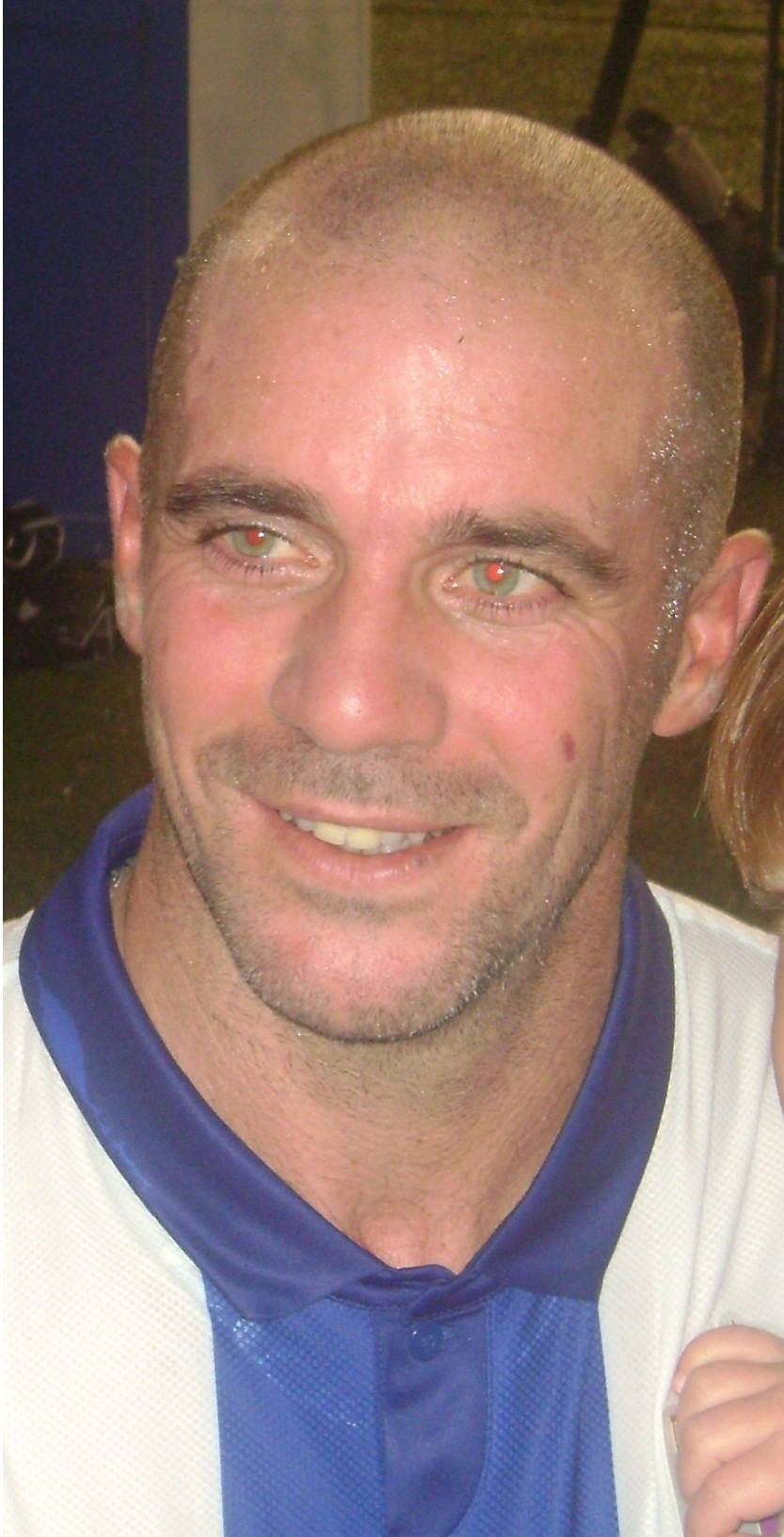
- Pandiani in August 2016

Personal information
- Full name: Walter Gerardo Pandiani Urquiza
- Date of birth: 27 April 1976 (age 50)
- Place of birth: Montevideo, Uruguay
- Height: 1.84 m (6 ft 0 in)
- Position: Striker

Team information
- Current team: Palencia

Senior career*
Years	Team	Apps	(Gls)
1995–1997	C.A. Basañez	22	(12)
1997–1998	Basáñez	0	(0)
1998–2000	Peñarol	71	(29)
2000–2005	Deportivo La Coruña	86	(31)
2002–2003	→ Mallorca (loan)	33	(13)
2005	→ Birmingham City (loan)	14	(4)
2005–2006	Birmingham City	17	(2)
2006–2007	Espanyol	52	(8)
2007–2011	Osasuna	92	(27)
2011–2012	Espanyol	16	(3)
2012–2013	Villarreal	17	(2)
2013	Atlético Baleares	9	(1)
2013–2014	Miramar Misiones	19	(5)
2015–2016	Lausanne-Sport	15	(1)
Total		463	(138)

International career
2001–2004	Uruguay	4	(0)

Managerial career
- 2014–2015: Masnou (youth)
- 2016: Masnou
- 2016–2017: Europa (youth)
- 2017–2018: Hospitalet (youth)
- 2019: Lorca
- 2020–2021: Dibba Al-Hisn
- 2021–2022: Cerro
- 2022: Cerrito
- 2023: Albion
- 2024–2025: Miramar Misiones
- 2026–: Palencia
- * Club domestic league appearances and goals

Walter Gerardo Pandiani Urquiza (born 27 April 1976) is a Uruguayan football manager and former player who played as a striker. He is the current manager of Tercera Federación club Palencia.

He started his career at Peñarol in Uruguay, before moving to Spain in 2000, where he would spend the next 12 out of 13 seasons, playing 279 games in La Liga, scoring 82 goals, and winning the Copa del Rey three times. He first moved to Deportivo, where he would spend five years, including loan spells with Mallorca, and also Birmingham City in England who he then joined permanently in 2005. He then joined Espanyol and helped them reach the 2007 UEFA Cup final, before joining Osasuna. After four years, he returned to Espanyol, and also had short spells with Villarreal and a few other teams, before retiring from professional football in 2016. He also played four times for the Uruguay national team between 2001 and 2004.

== Playing career ==
=== Early years and Deportivo ===
Born in Montevideo, Pandiani started his career with hometown club Progreso, moving on to Basáñez and Peñarol, the latter also in the country's capital. In December 1999 he agreed terms to join Deportivo La Coruña as a replacement for his compatriot Sergio Martínez, and the move was officially completed the following January when he signed a five-and-a-half-year deal for an undisclosed fee, still remaining with Peñarol until the end of the season.

Pandiani made his debut for the Spaniards on 27 August 2000, coming from the bench for Diego Tristán in a 2–0 win over Espanyol at Estadio Riazor in the Supercopa de España return match. Despite never being an undisputed starter for the Galician team he was one of their most important attacking elements, often scoring as a substitute, netting 13 goals during the 2003–04 season.

Pandiani, who had a successful loan stint at Mallorca while still at Depor, moved to Birmingham City in the Premier League, also on loan, in January 2005, after a series of run-ins with coach Javier Irureta. He scored a goal on his debut against Southampton in a 2–1 home win, and went on to score three more in the season, prompting manager Steve Bruce to sign him on a permanent contract for a reported fee of £3 million.

During his time at Deportivo, Pandiani bought a big red truck which he drove to training, a type of vehicle that he is a fan of, which he kept while at Deportivo, Espanyol and Osasuna. He personalised it with his nickname "El Rifle", a Uruguayan flag, and the emblems of his club and Uruguayan club Peñarol.

=== Espanyol ===
Having failed to continue to display his previous form, Pandiani returned to Spain on 13 January 2006, after completing a move to Espanyol for £1 million.

In his first full season he scored only seven La Liga goals, including a first-half hat-trick against eventual champions Real Madrid in the Santiago Bernabéu Stadium, but was top scorer in the 2006–07 UEFA Cup with eleven as his club reached the final, which they lost on penalties to Sevilla.

During his time at Espanyol, Pandiani, and Barcelona's José Manuel Pinto, drove in the 2011 Barcelona "Monster Jam" monster truck event.

=== Osasuna ===
For 2007–08, Pandiani joined Osasuna. Scarcely used in his first year, he was instrumental for the Navarrese in the following campaign, especially after the arrival in mid-October of coach José Antonio Camacho, finishing as the club's top scorer.

Osasuna's first goal of the 2010–11 season only came in the fourth matchday, and the 34-year-old Pandiani scored it through a header as the team came from behind to win it 3–1 against Real Sociedad, at home. On 30 January 2011, during half-time of a 1–0 home win against Real Madrid, he was involved in a "verbal spat" with Cristiano Ronaldo, suggesting afterwards that "As a footballer he is a phenomenon but to do the things he does, maybe he has a screw loose."

=== Later career ===
The 35-year-old Pandiani returned to Espanyol for 2011–12, signing a one-year contract and acting mainly as backup to youth graduate Álvaro Vázquez. On 22 September he came from the bench to score the game's only goal at home against Getafe, in stoppage time. On 27 October he repeated the feat, albeit not so late in the game, with a powerful header at home to Real Betis.

In late August 2012, Pandiani signed a one-year contract with Segunda División club Villarreal, where his 18-year-old son Nico was a C-team player. On his debut, at home to Guadalajara on 2 September, he entered the game as a second-half substitute and scored the winning goal, and did the same the following week in another narrow win, at Ponferradina.

In late January 2013, Pandiani and Nico left Villarreal and joined Atlético Baleares of the Segunda División B. They both started in Nico's second senior match, and Pandiani scored in the 2–1 defeat away to Sant Andreu on 12 May.

In October 2013, the pair returned to Uruguay and signed for Primera División club Miramar Misiones. Pandiani scored three times in the six remaining matches of the 2013–14 Apertura, as his team finished next to bottom, and played regularly during the Clausura but scored only twice as they repeated their previous finish, which contributed to relegation.

Pandiani returned to the Barcelona area where he spent the 2014–15 season coaching junior teams at Masnou, where two of his sons played. He said that although he had always wanted to coach, he still thought of himself as a player and was open to offers; in June 2015, he signed for Lausanne-Sport of the Swiss Challenge League, with the remit of supervising and teaching the tricks of the trade to the 15-year-old striker Andi Zeqiri, who had already made his first-team debut. The club won promotion to the Super League as champions in his only season; his one goal was an equaliser in a 1–1 home draw with Aarau on 4 April, taking Walter Samuel's record as oldest person to score in either of the top two divisions of Swiss football, though the Argentine played for Basel in the top flight.

Pandiani announced his retirement on 16 June 2016 after a 23-year professional career, at the age of 40. After he retired, his truck was auctioned in Barcelona with 518,000 miles on the clock.

== International career ==
Despite his relatively successful career in Spain, Pandiani only received four caps for Uruguay, the first coming on 28 March 2001 in a 1–0 home defeat against Paraguay in the 2002 World Cup qualifiers.

== Managerial career ==
Pandiani returned to Masnou after retiring, now as a first-team manager. Sacked on 2 November 2016, he was appointed at the helm of Europa's Juvenil A squad on 13 December.

On 27 June 2017, Pandiani was named manager of Hospitalet's youth squad. Two years later, he was given his first senior managerial job at Lorca in the Tercera División. He left on 30 December 2019, with the team in seventh place.

Following a spell at Dibba Al-Hisn in the United Arab Emirates, where he signed his son Axel, Pandiani was hired at Cerro in the Uruguayan Segunda División in June 2021. He lost in the promotion playoffs to Defensor in his first season and was sacked in July 2022 with the team in fourth.

On 27 July 2022, Pandiani signed for Cerrito, in last place in the top flight. He was fired on 30 August after taking two points from five games.

Pandiani was announced as the new manager of Albion on 20 December 2022, ahead of the 2023 season in the second division. He left the club at the end of the campaign, and took over Miramar Misiones in the top tier on 27 May 2024.

== Style of play ==
Nicknamed El Rifle (The Rifle), Pandiani's best assets were his strength and aerial ability.

== Career statistics ==
=== International ===
Uruguay
Year	Apps	Goals
2001	1	0
2002	0	0
2003	1	0
2004	2	0
Total	4	0

== Honours ==
Peñarol

- Uruguayan Primera División: 1999

Deportivo

- Copa del Rey: 2001–02
- Supercopa de España: 2000, 2002

Mallorca

- Copa del Rey: 2002–03

Espanyol

- Copa del Rey: 2005–06
- UEFA Cup runner-up: 2006–07

Lausanne

- Swiss Challenge League: 2015–16

Individual

- UEFA Cup Top Scorer: 2006–07
