= Denis Olivera =

Uruguayan footballer (born 1999)

Personal information
- Full name: Denis César Olivera Lima
- Date of birth: 29 July 1999 (age 27)
- Place of birth: Minas, Uruguay
- Height: 1.86 m (6 ft 1 in)
- Position: Midfielder

Team information
- Current team: Miramar Misiones
- Number: 25

Youth career
- Danubio

Senior career*
Years	Team	Apps	(Gls)
2019–2023	Danubio	31	(0)
2020	→ Peñarol (loan)	7	(0)
2021	→ Villa Española (loan)	23	(4)
2023	Miramar Misiones	58	(13)
2026–	Aurora	3	(1)
- * Club domestic league appearances and goals as of 19 August 2026

Denis César Olivera Lima (born 29 July 1999) is a Uruguayan footballer who plays as a midfielder for Miramar Misiones in the Uruguayan Primera División.

== Career ==
=== Early career ===
At the age of 11, Olivera's father died due to an illness. He almost quit playing as a result, but was encouraged to continue by his mother.

=== Peñarol ===
In January 2020, Olivera moved on loan to Peñarol, embarking on a two-year loan period with the club. He made his debut for the club on 23 February 2020 in a 2–1 defeat to Defensor Sporting.

In February 2021, following Peñarol's match against Nacional, Olivera was subject to racial abuse on social media from the club's fans.
