= Andrés Mehring =

Argentine association football player

Personal information
- Full name: Andrés Augusto Mehring
- Date of birth: 19 April 1994 (age 32)
- Place of birth: Franck, Argentina
- Height: 1.91 m (6 ft 3 in)
- Position: Goalkeeper

Team information
- Current team: Central Córdoba SdE
- Number: 34

Youth career
- Argentino de Franck
- Colón

Senior career*
Years	Team	Apps	(Gls)
2013–2016	Colón	1	(0)
2016–2018	Guillermo Brown	39	(0)
2018	Argentino de Franck		
2018–2019	Godoy Cruz	8	(0)
2020	Liverpool	14	(0)
2021–2022	Central Córdoba SdE	10	(0)
2023	Fénix	24	(0)
2024–	Central Córdoba SdE	5	(0)

International career
- Argentina U20
- * Club domestic league appearances and goals as of 17:31, 19 April 2024 (UTC)

Andrés Augusto Mehring (born 19 April 1994) is an Argentine professional footballer who plays as a goalkeeper for Central Córdoba.

== Club career ==
Mehring began his career with Argentino de Franck, which preceded a move to Colón. He would play with Colón's first-team for three years, initially appearing on the substitutes twice during 2012–13 in the Argentine Primera División; but went unused. In 2015, he was an unused sub fifteen times prior to making his professional debut for Colón against Nueva Chicago on 12 July. It was his only appearance in the campaign as he was on the bench a further thirteen times. July 2016 saw Mehring join Primera B Nacional's Guillermo Brown. He was selected in thirty-nine league fixtures in his first season, missing the other five due to injury.

He had suffered a knee injury during his final match of 2016–17 versus Brown, which meant Mehring missed the following season. He left Guillermo Brown in 2018, subsequently having a short spell with former youth club Argentino de Franck in Liga Esperancina. Months later, on 10 June, Argentine Primera División side Godoy Cruz signed Mehring. He appeared fourteen times in all competitions for the club. In January 2020, Mehring headed to Uruguay with Liverpool. His debut arrived on 2 February in the Supercopa Uruguaya, as they defeated Nacional to win the trophy. He left at the end of 2020, after nineteen games.

== International career ==
Mehring represented Argentina at U20 level, being selected in squads for the 2012 Cape Town International Challenge and the 2013 South American Youth Football Championship.

== Career statistics ==
As of 3 January 2021.

Club statistics
Club	Season	League			Cup		League Cup		Continental		Other		Total	
Club	Season	Division	Apps	Goals	Apps	Goals	Apps	Goals	Apps	Goals	Apps	Goals	Apps	Goals
Colón	2012–13	Argentine Primera División	0	0	0	0	—		0	0	0	0	0	0
Colón	2013–14	Argentine Primera División	0	0	0	0	—		—		0	0	0	0
Colón	2014	Argentine Primera División	0	0	0	0	—		—		0	0	0	0
Colón	2015	Argentine Primera División	1	0	0	0	—		—		0	0	1	0
Colón	2016	Argentine Primera División	0	0	0	0	—		—		0	0	0	0
Colón	Total		1	0	0	0	—		0	0	0	0	1	0
Guillermo Brown	2016–17	Primera B Nacional	39	0	0	0	—		—		0	0	39	0
Guillermo Brown	2017–18	Primera B Nacional	0	0	0	0	—		—		0	0	0	0
Guillermo Brown	Total		39	0	0	0	—		—		0	0	39	0
Godoy Cruz	2018–19	Argentine Primera División	1	0	1	0	1	0	0	0	0	0	3	0
Godoy Cruz	2019–20	Argentine Primera División	7	0	2	0	0	0	2 (Note: Appearance(s) in the Copa Libertadores)	0	0	0	11	0
Godoy Cruz	Total		8	0	3	0	1	0	2	0	0	0	14	0
Liverpool	2020	Uruguayan Primera División	14	0	—		—		4 (Note: Appearance(s) in the Copa Sudamericana)	0	1 (Note: Appearance(s) in the Supercopa Uruguaya)	0	19	0
Career total			62	0	3	0	1	0	6	0	1	0	73	0

== Honours ==
Liverpool

- Supercopa Uruguaya: 2020
