= Ignacio Yepez =

Colombian footballer (born 1998)

Personal information
- Full name: Ignacio Andrés Yepez Guzmán
- Date of birth: 20 October 1998 (age 28)
- Place of birth: Barranquilla, Colombia
- Height: 1.85 m (6 ft 1 in)
- Positions: Midfielder; forward

Team information
- Current team: Miramar Misiones
- Number: 7

Senior career*
Years	Team	Apps	(Gls)
2016	Barranquilla	1	(0)
2017	Junior		
2017–2018	Peñarol B		
2019	Danubio B		
2019	Villa Española	11	(3)
2020	Cerro	12	(1)
2021–	Miramar Misiones	78	(19)
- * Club domestic league appearances and goals as of 7 September 2024

Ignacio Andrés Yepez Guzmán (born 20 October 1998) is a Colombian footballer who plays for Uruguayan club Miramar Misiones.

== Career ==
In 2017, Yepez signed for Peñarol, the most successful team in Uruguay. However, his contract with previous club Atlético Junior had not ended so was unable to play until the situation was solved. On top of that, Yepez then sustained an injury that kept him out for 10 months. After failing to make a league appearance with Peñarol and Danubio, he signed for C.S.D. Villa Española before joining C.A. Cerro.
