= Maximiliano Cantera =

Uruguayan footballer (born 1993)

Personal information
- Full name: Marcos Maximiliano Cantera Mora
- Date of birth: 10 May 1993 (age 33)
- Place of birth: Cerrillos, Uruguay
- Height: 1.85 m (6 ft 1 in)
- Position: Midfielder

Team information
- Current team: Danubio
- Number: 20

Youth career
- Juventud de Las Piedras
- Bologna

Senior career*
Years	Team	Apps	(Gls)
2013–2014	Cerro Largo	22	(3)
2014–2017	Liverpool Montevideo	36	(0)
2016	→ Fénix (loan)	28	(5)
2017	Fénix	14	(2)
2018	Deportivo Táchira	10	(0)
2018–2019	Fénix	37	(2)
2020–2024	Deportivo Maldonado	104	(27)
2021	→ Nacional (loan)	20	(1)
2023	→ Atlético Nacional (loan)	12	(0)
2024–	Danubio	5	(1)
- * Club domestic league appearances and goals as of 16:16, 20 July 2024 (UTC)

Marcos Maximiliano Cantera Mora (born 10 May 1993) is a Uruguayan professional footballer who plays as a midfielder for Danubio. He has made over 250 appearances in the Uruguayan Primera División for Cerro Largo, Liverpool Montevideo, Fénix, Deportivo Maldonado, Nacional and Danubio.

He won the Uruguayan Segunda División in 2015 for Liverpool and the Supercopa Uruguaya with Nacional in 2021. Abroad, he played in the Venezuelan Primera División for Deportivo Táchira in 2018 and the Colombian Categoría Primera A for Atlético Nacional in 2023.

== Career ==
=== Early career ===
Born in Cerillos in Canelones Department, Cantera began his youth career at Juventud de Las Piedras before joining Peñarol in Montevideo. Aged 18 and having made the fourth team, he moved through his agent to Italian club Bologna for a three-month trial. Without the technology to communicate with his family back home, he entertained himself by watching television in his hotel room, becoming a fan of Cristiano Ronaldo.

Cantera began his professional career at Cerro Largo. On his debut in the Uruguayan Primera División on 23 February 2013, he equalised away to Montevideo Wanderers eight minutes into the second half, albeit in a 2–1 defeat.

Ahead of the 2014–15 season, Cantera left relegated Cerro Largo for another team in the Uruguayan Segunda División, Liverpool Montevideo. In January 2016, with Liverpool back in the top flight, he transferred to Fénix.

At the start of 2018, Cantera moved abroad for the first time, signing a one-year deal at Deportivo Táchira in the Venezuelan Primera División. Speaking in 2022, he said that he was shocked by the hunger and poverty in his new country.

=== Deportivo Maldonado ===
Cantera signed for Deportivo Maldonado in January 2020. He scored eight goals in his first season, including opening a 2–0 home win over Peñarol on 19 August, and equalising with a penalty away to the same team on 11 February 2021.

In April 2021, Cantera returned to the capital city and signed for Nacional on a 15-month loan with option to purchase. On his debut on 2 May, he won the Supercopa Uruguaya in a 1–0 win over Wanderers, playing the final nine minutes in place of Felipe Carballo. He played 20 league games for the Tricolor, scoring once to open a 2–1 win at former club Fénix on 10 October.

In the 2022 Uruguayan Primera División season, Cantera scored a career-best 11 goals as Maldonado finished a best-ever third and qualified for the first time to the Copa Libertadores. On 30 July, he scored twice in the first half of a 2–1 home win over Nacional.

Cantera moved abroad again in July 2023 to Atlético Nacional of the Colombian Categoría Primera A, on a one-year loan with options to extend or make permanent. His spell in Medellín ended by mutual accord in December, having only proven himself on 3 August by scoring twice off the bench in a 4–2 home win over Argentina's Racing Club in the Libertadores.

=== Danubio ===
In July 2024, Cantera signed for Danubio until June 2025.

== Honours ==
Liverpool Montevideo

- Uruguayan Segunda División: 2014–15

Nacional

- Supercopa Uruguaya: 2021
