= Jorge Ayala (footballer) =

Uruguayan footballer

Personal information
- Full name: Jorge Nicolás Ayala Silva
- Date of birth: 15 August 1995 (age 31)
- Place of birth: Montevideo, Uruguay
- Height: 1.87 m (6 ft 2 in)
- Position: Centre-back

Team information
- Current team: Deportes Iquique
- Number: 15

Youth career
- 2011–2015: Villa Teresa

Senior career*
Years	Team	Apps	(Gls)
2016–2021	Villa Teresa	94	(6)
2022–2023	Plaza Colonia	64	(2)
2024–2025	Miramar Misiones	58	(5)
2026–	Deportes Iquique	1	(0)
- * Club domestic league appearances and goals as of 23 February 2026

Jorge Nicolás Ayala Silva (born 15 August 1995), also known as Nicolás Ayala, is a Uruguayan footballer who plays as a centre-back for Chilean club Deportes Iquique.

== Club career ==
A left-footed defender, Ayala is a product of Villa Teresa, made his debut in the 2015–2016 season and spent six seasons with them until 2021. He switched to Plaza Colonia in the Uruguayan Primera División for 2022 and 2023 and took part in the 2022 Copa Libertadores.

In 2024 and 2025, Ayala played for Miramar Misiones.

In December 2025, Ayala moved abroad and signed with Chilean club Deportes Iquique.
