= Valentín Villazán =

Uruguayan footballer (born 1980)

Personal information
- Full name: Valentín Villazán Castro
- Date of birth: 12 February 1980 (age 46)
- Place of birth: Montevideo, Uruguay
- Height: 1.82 m (6 ft 0 in)
- Position: Midfielder

Team information
- Current team: C.A. Rentistas (Head Coach)

Senior career*
Years	Team	Apps	(Gls)
2000–2005	Rentistas	?	(?)
2005	Cerro	16	(4)
2006	Nueva Chicago	?	(?)
2006	Fénix	?	(?)
2007	Rentistas	12	(7)
2007–2008	Bella Vista	15	(2)
2008	Rentistas	?	(1)
2009–2010	Heredia Jaguares de Peten	?	(?)
2010–2013	Rentistas	31	(2)

Managerial career
- 2015–: Rentistas
- * Club domestic league appearances and goals as of January 1, 2015

Valentín Villazán Castro (born 12 February 1980 in Montevideo) is a retired Uruguayan footballer who manages C.A. Liverpool de montevideo in the Uruguayan Primera División.
