= Carlos Manta =

Uruguayan footballer (born 1953)

Personal information
- Full name: Carlos Alberto Manta Berio
- Date of birth: 17 November 1953 (age 72)
- Place of birth: Montevideo, Uruguay
- Position: Goalkeeper

Senior career*
Years	Team	Apps	(Gls)
–1973	Defensor Sporting		
1974–1982	Miramar Misiones		
1982–1983	River Plate Montevideo		
1983–1984	Rentistas		
1984–1985	Rampla Juniors		
1985–1986	Sportivo Italiano		
1986–1987	Libertad San Carlos		

Managerial career
- 1992: Liverpool Montevideo
- 1993–1994: Rentistas
- 1995: Rampla Juniors
- 1996: Rentistas
- 1997: Miramar Misiones
- 1998: Deportivo Maldonado
- 1998: Central Español
- 1999: Racing Club Montevideo
- 2000–2001: Paysandú
- 2002–2004: Deportivo Colonia
- 2004–2006: Rentistas
- 2006: Tacuarembó
- 2007: Liverpool Montevideo
- 2008: Bella Vista
- 2009: Tacuarembó
- 2010: Melgar
- 2011: Tacuary
- 2011–2013: Miramar Misiones
- 2013: Plaza Colonia
- * Club domestic league appearances and goals

Carlos Alberto Manta Berio (born 19 May 1953) is a Uruguayan football manager and former player who played as a goalkeeper.
