= Martín Correa (footballer, born 1991) =

Uruguayan footballer (born 1991)

Personal information
- Full name: Bruno Martín Correa Araújo
- Date of birth: 27 July 1991 (age 35)
- Place of birth: Montevideo, Uruguay
- Height: 1.67 m (5 ft 6 in)
- Positions: Midfielder; winger

Team information
- Current team: Liverpool (Montevideo)

Youth career
- Fénix
- Wanderers
- Peñarol

Senior career*
Years	Team	Apps	(Gls)
-2011	Wanderers	2	(0)
2013	Progreso	13	(0)
2013	Sud América	4	(0)
2014	Villa Teresa	8	(1)
2014-2015	Canadian	19	(5)
2015-2016	Villa Española	32	(3)
2017	Montevideo City Torque	27	(7)
2018	River Plate (Montevideo)	20	(4)
2018-	Defensor Sporting	40	(5)
2020-	→ Liverpool (Montevideo) (loan)	29	(1)
- * Club domestic league appearances and goals

Bruno Martín Correa Araújo (born 27 July 1991) is a Uruguayan footballer who plays as a midfielder or winger for Liverpool (Montevideo).

== Career ==
Correa started his career with Wanderers in Uruguay before joining the youth academy of Peñarol, Uruguay's most successful club.

Before the second half of 2013/14, Correa signed for Villa Teresa in the Uruguayan second division, where he made 8 league appearances and scored 1 goal.

Before the 2018 season, Correa signed for Uruguayan top flight side River Plate (Montevideo), where he made 20 league appearances and scored 4 goals.
