= Franco Fagúndez =

Uruguayan footballer (born 2000)

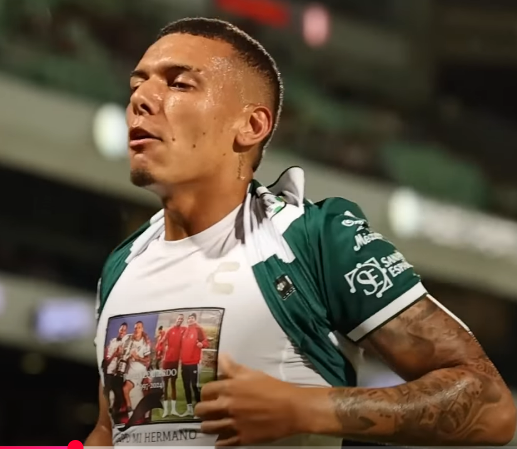
- Fagúndez in 2024

Personal information
- Full name: Franco Misael Fagúndez Rosa
- Date of birth: 19 July 2000 (age 26)
- Place of birth: Montevideo, Uruguay
- Height: 1.87 m (6 ft 2 in)
- Position: Forward

Team information
- Current team: Independiente Santa Fe (on loan from Santos Laguna)
- Number: 9

Youth career
- Montevideo Wanderers
- Danubio

Senior career*
Years	Team	Apps	(Gls)
2021–2023	Nacional	63	(12)
2024–	Santos Laguna	30	(3)
2026–	→ Independiente Santa Fe (loan)	0	(0)
- * Club domestic league appearances and goals as of 26 July 2025

Franco Misael Fagúndez Rosa (born 19 July 2000) is a Uruguayan professional footballer who plays as a forward for Categoría Primera A club Independiente Santa Fe, on loan from Liga MX club Santos Laguna.

== Career ==
Fagúndez is a former youth academy player of Montevideo Wanderers and Danubio. In January 2020, he joined Nacional and initially started to play with club's reserve team. He made his professional debut for Nacional on 19 November 2021 in a 1–0 league win against Cerrito. On 13 March 2022, he scored his first goal for the club in a 1–1 draw against Montevideo City Torque.

== Career statistics ==
As of 11 February 2023

Appearances and goals by club, season and competition
Club	Season	League			Cup		Continental		Other		Total	
Club	Season	Division	Apps	Goals	Apps	Goals	Apps	Goals	Apps	Goals	Apps	Goals
Nacional	2021	Uruguayan Primera División	2	0	—		0	0	0	0	2	0
Nacional	2022	Uruguayan Primera División	31	10	0	0	8 (Note: Four appearances and one goal in Copa Sudamericana, four appearances in Copa Libertadores)	1	2 (Note: One appearance each in Torneo Intermedio final and championship playoff)	0	41	11
Nacional	2023	Uruguayan Primera División	2	0	0	0	0	0	1 (Note: Appearance in Supercopa Uruguaya)	0	3	0
Career total			35	10	0	0	8	1	3	0	46	11

== Honours ==
Nacional

- Uruguayan Primera División: 2022

Individual

- Uruguayan Primera División Team of the Year: 2022
