= Gastón Guruceaga (footballer, born 1990) =

Argentine footballer

Personal information
- Full name: Gastón Ezequiel Guruceaga Bracamonte
- Date of birth: 6 April 1990 (age 36)
- Place of birth: Rosario, Argentina
- Height: 1.76 m (5 ft 9 in)
- Position: Right-back

Team information
- Current team: Huércal-Overa

Senior career*
Years	Team	Apps	(Gls)
2011	Newell's Old Boys	1	(0)
2011–2012	Tiro Federal	5	(0)
2012–2013	Central Córdoba	25	(1)
2013–2015	Sportivo Belgrano	50	(0)
2016–2017	Los Andes	51	(0)
2018	Cerro	1	(0)
2018–2019	Los Andes	10	(0)
2020–	Huércal-Overa	6	(0)
- * Club domestic league appearances and goals as of 18:37, 16 December 2020 (UTC)

Gastón Ezequiel Guruceaga Bracamonte (born 6 April 1990) is an Argentine professional footballer who plays as a right-back for Huércal-Overa.

== Career ==
Guruceaga's career started in the ranks of Newell's Old Boys. He made one appearance in the Primera División for the club, it came in a 3–1 defeat away to Quilmes on 15 April 2011. In the following November, Guruceaga moved to Torneo Argentino A side Tiro Federal. Five appearances followed in 2011–12. Central Córdoba signed Guruceaga on 13 July 2012, with the defender going on to play twenty-seven times whilst scoring his first senior goal - against Los Andes. His sole season with Central Córdoba ended with relegation from Primera B Metropolitana. Guruceaga subsequently joined Sportivo Belgrano of Primera B Nacional.

Having spent three seasons with Sportivo Belgrano, the last campaign being 2015 which concluded with his second career relegation, Los Andes became his fifth club in January 2016; therefore allowing Guruceaga to remain in tier two. After fifty-three appearances across 2016 and 2016–17, Guruceaga switched Argentina for Uruguay by agreeing to join Cerro in 2018. His bow for the Primera División outfit arrived in the Copa Sudamericana versus Sport Rosario on 20 February, he was substituted on for Agustín Sant’Anna in what was the first of just two matches for Cerro. A return to Los Andes in Argentina was completed in June 2018.

Guruceaga left Los Andes in June 2019. In July 2020, Guruceaga joined Spanish Tercera División side Huércal-Overa. He debuted in a goalless draw way to Ciudad de Murcia on 25 October.

== Career statistics ==
As of 16 December 2020.

Appearances and goals by club, season and competition
Club	Season	League			Cup		Continental		Other		Total	
Club	Season	Division	Apps	Goals	Apps	Goals	Apps	Goals	Apps	Goals	Apps	Goals
Newell's Old Boys	2010–11	Argentine Primera División	1	0	0	0	0	0	0	0	1	0
Newell's Old Boys	2011–12	Argentine Primera División	0	0	0	0	—		0	0	0	0
Newell's Old Boys	Total		1	0	0	0	0	0	0	0	1	0
Tiro Federal	2011–12	Torneo Argentino A	5	0	0	0	—		0	0	5	0
Central Córdoba	2012–13	Primera B Metropolitana	25	1	2	0	—		0	0	27	1
Sportivo Belgrano	2013–14	Primera B Nacional	22	0	0	0	—		0	0	22	0
Sportivo Belgrano	2014	Primera B Nacional	0	0	0	0	—		0	0	0	0
Sportivo Belgrano	2015	Primera B Nacional	28	0	0	0	—		0	0	28	0
Sportivo Belgrano	Total		50	0	0	0	—		0	0	50	0
Los Andes	2016	Primera B Nacional	12	0	0	0	—		0	0	12	0
Los Andes	2016–17	Primera B Nacional	39	0	2	0	—		0	0	41	0
Los Andes	Total		51	0	2	0	—		0	0	53	0
Cerro	2018	Uruguayan Primera División	1	0	0	0	1 (Note: Appearance(s) in the Copa Sudamericana)	0	0	0	2	0
Los Andes	2018–19	Primera B Nacional	10	0	0	0	—		0	0	10	0
Huércal-Overa	2020–21	Tercera División	6	0	0	0	—		0	0	6	0
Career total			149	1	4	0	1	0	0	0	154	1
