= Nelson Marcenaro =

Uruguayan footballer (1952–2021)

Personal information
- Full name: Nelson Luis Marcenaro Nieves
- Date of birth: 4 September 1952
- Place of birth: Montevideo, Uruguay
- Date of death: 13 May 2021 (aged 68)
- Position: Centre back

Youth career
- Progreso

Senior career*
Years	Team	Apps	(Gls)
1970–1971	Progreso		
1972–1977	Portuguesa		
1978–1984	Peñarol		
1985	Emelec		

International career
1979–1981	Uruguay	8	(0)
- * Club domestic league appearances and goals

Nelson Luis Marcenaro Nieves (4 September 1952 – 13 May 2021) was an Uruguayan footballer who played as a centre back.

== Career ==
Born in Montevideo, Marcenaro played club football for Progreso, Portuguesa, Peñarol, and Emelec. With Peñarol he won the national title on four occasions, and also won the Copa Libertadores and Intercontinental Cup.

He also earned 8 caps for the Uruguay national team between 1979 and 1981, they won the 1980 Mundialito.

== Personal life ==
His brother Roland was also a footballer and later a coach.

From 2014 he worked to support former footballers with food and housing.

He suffered a stroke in March 2020. He died on 13 May 2021, aged 68, from a heart attack.
