= Adrián Fernández (footballer, born 1977) =

Uruguayan football manager

Personal information
- Full name: Claudio Adrián Fernández Leal
- Date of birth: 30 January 1977 (age 49)
- Place of birth: Montevideo, Uruguay
- Position: Forward

Senior career*
Years	Team	Apps	(Gls)
1997	Albion		
1998–2000	Liverpool Montevideo		
2000	Salus		
2001–2004	Uruguay Montevideo		
2005	Progreso		
2006–2007	Sud América		
2008	Deportivo Maldonado		

Managerial career
- 2012–2016: Oriental
- 2016–2017: Villa Teresa
- 2017: Cerro Largo
- 2018: Villa Teresa
- 2019–2020: Sud América
- 2020: Villa Teresa
- 2022: Cerrito
- 2022: Juventud de Las Piedras
- 2023: Plaza Colonia
- * Club domestic league appearances and goals

Claudio Adrián Fernández Leal (born 30 January 1977) is a Uruguayan football manager and former player who played as a forward.

== Playing career ==
Born in Montevideo, Fernández represented Albion, Liverpool Montevideo, Salus, Uruguay Montevideo, Progreso, Sud América and Deportivo Maldonado.

== Managerial career ==
After retiring, Fernández began his managerial career with Oriental. In July 2016, he took over Villa Teresa, but left the following January.

In May 2017, Fernández was named in charge of Cerro Largo, but was dismissed in November. On 25 January of the following year, he returned to Villa Teresa.

On 26 July 2019, Fernández was appointed manager of Sud América, but left the following February. He returned to Villa Teresa for a third spell shortly after, before being named in charge of Cerrito on 15 January 2022.

Fernández resigned from Cerrito on 11 April 2022. He finished the year in charge of Juventud de Las Piedras, before returning to the top tier on 22 May 2023, after being named in charge of Plaza Colonia.

On 28 August 2023, Fernández was sacked by Plaza Colonia.
