= Leonel Rocco =

Uruguayan footballer (born 1966)

Personal information
- Full name: Leonel Rocco Herrera
- Date of birth: 18 September 1966 (age 60)
- Place of birth: Montevideo, Uruguay
- Height: 1.85 m (6 ft 1 in)
- Position: Goalkeeper

Team information
- Current team: Danubio (manager)

Senior career*
Years	Team	Apps	(Gls)
1990–1991	Progreso		
1991–1992	Textil Mandiyú	14	(0)
1993	Nacional		
1994–1995	Rampla Juniors		
1996	Tampico Madero		
1999	Bella Vista		
2000	Independiente Santa Fe		
2001	Bucaramanga		
2002	Independiente Medellín		
2003–2004	Melgar	56	(0)
2005–2007	Rentistas		

International career
1991	Uruguay	0	(0)

Managerial career
- 2015: Barcelona SC (goalkeeper coach)
- 2016: Plaza Colonia (goalkeeper coach)
- 2016–2017: Plaza Colonia
- 2018–2020: Progreso
- 2021: Atlético San Luis
- 2021: Defensor Sporting
- 2022: Rentistas
- 2023–2024: Fénix
- 2025–2026: Progreso
- 2026–: Danubio
- * Club domestic league appearances and goals

Leonel Rocco Herrera (born 18 September 1966) is a Uruguayan football manager and former player who played as a goalkeeper. He is the current manager of Danubio.

== Club career ==
Rocco spent most of his career in the Primera División Uruguaya, playing for Progreso, Nacional and Rampla Juniors. He also had a spell with Textil Mandiyú in the Primera División de Argentina.

== International career ==
Rocco was selected as a member of the Uruguay national football team at the 1991 Copa América, but did not make an appearance for the team.
