= Gastón Guruceaga (footballer, born 1995) =

Uruguayan footballer (born 1995)

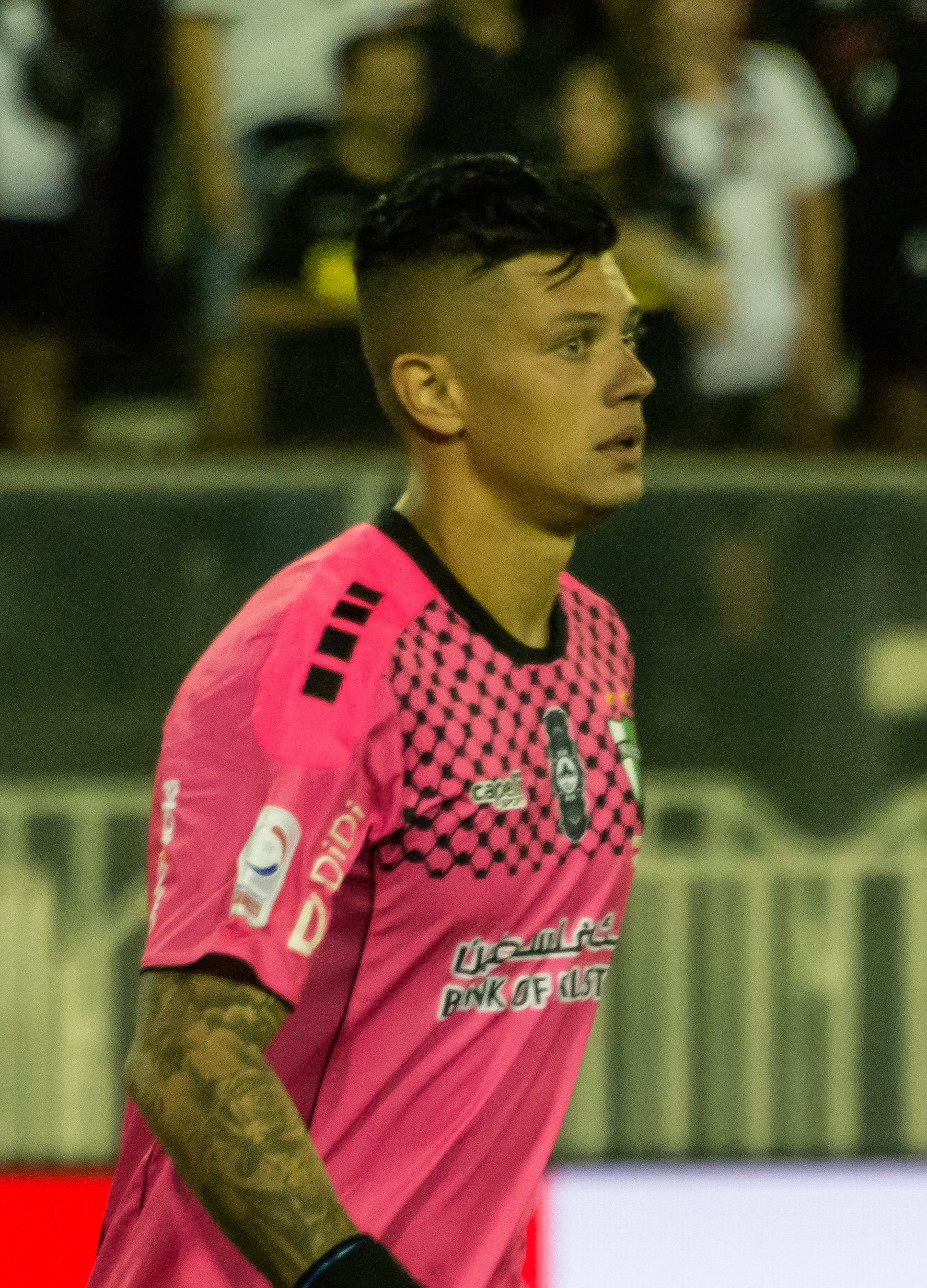
- Guruceaga with Palestino in 2020

Personal information
- Full name: Gastón Guruceaga Fagúndez
- Date of birth: 15 March 1995 (age 31)
- Place of birth: Artigas, Uruguay
- Height: 1.94 m (6 ft 4 in)
- Position: Goalkeeper

Team information
- Current team: Náutico
- Number: 55

Youth career
- Fénix
- Peñarol

Senior career*
Years	Team	Apps	(Gls)
2015–2021	Peñarol	65	(0)
2018	→ Guaraní (loan)	8	(0)
2019	→ Tigre (loan)	2	(0)
2020	→ Palestino (loan)	8	(0)
2021–2023	Montevideo City Torque	78	(1)
2024	Liverpool Montevideo	8	(0)
2024–2025	Deportivo Cali	12	(0)
2025	Juventude	0	(0)
2026–	Náutico	7	(0)

International career
2010	Uruguay U17	3	(0)
2014–2015	Uruguay U20	24	(0)
- * Club domestic league appearances and goals as of 18 November 2026

Gastón Guruceaga Fagúndez (born 15 March 1995) is a Uruguayan professional footballer who plays as a goalkeeper for Brazilian club Náutico.

== Club career ==
=== Peñarol ===
Guruceaga played all his career for Peñarol. He made his professional debut in club football in the first game of the 2015–16 Uruguayan Primera División season against Cerro at Estadio Centenario in a 3–0 win for his team. Peñarol won the Uruguayan Primera División that year.

In the following season and due to the last minute departure to Italian side Fiorentina of planned to be captain of the team Maximiliano Olivera, Guruceaga was chosen to be the captain of Peñarol by the manager Jorge da Silva with only 21 years.

On 24 January 2018, Guruceaga was loaned to Paraguayan club Guaraní for one year.

=== Montevideo City Torque and later spells ===
Between 2021 and 2023, he played for Montevideo City Torque, making 78 appearances and even scoring a goal. In 2024, he joined Liverpool, winning the 2024 Uruguayan Supercopa. Later in 2024, he moved to Colombian side Deportivo Cali.

=== Juventude ===
On 25 July 2025, Juventude announced the signing of Gastón Guruceaga from Colombian club Deportivo Cali. The Uruguayan goalkeeper signed a contract until the end of the 2025 season.

== International career ==
He represented Uruguay on the 2015 South American Youth Football Championship held in Uruguay between 14 January and 7 February and where the local team with Guruceaga starting every game of the tournament, finished third qualifying for the 2015 FIFA U-20 World Cup. Guruceaga was named best goalkeeper of the tournament.

He was selected to represent the national team in the 2015 FIFA U-20 World Cup later that year where he also was the starting goalkeeper on all the four games Uruguay played on the tournament.

Guruceaga was named in Uruguay's provisional squad for Copa América Centenario but was cut from the final squad.

== Honours ==
Peñarol

- Uruguayan Primera División: 2015–16, 2017

Tigre

- Copa de la Superliga: 2019

Liverpool Montevideo

- Supercopa Uruguaya: 2024
