= Carlos Alfaro Alcántara =

Chilean footballer (born 1991)

Carlos Alfaro
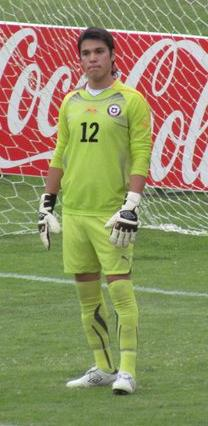

Personal information
- Full name: Carlos Andrés Alfaro Alcántara
- Date of birth: May 29, 1991 (age 35)
- Place of birth: Coquimbo, Chile
- Height: 1.83 m (6 ft 0 in)
- Position: Goalkeeper

Youth career
- 2004–2010: Coquimbo Unido

Senior career*
Years	Team	Apps	(Gls)
2010	Coquimbo Unido	8	(0)
2011–2014	Universidad de Chile	0	(0)
2013–2014	→ Ñublense (loan)	0	(0)
2014	→ Ñublense B (loan)	2	(0)
2015	Malleco Unido	15	(0)
2015–2017	Unión San Felipe	0	(0)
2017	Miami United	9	(0)
2017–2019	Deportes Copiapó	4	(0)
Total		38	(0)

International career
2011	Chile U20	4	(0)
- * Club domestic league appearances and goals

Carlos Andrés Alfaro Alcántara (born May 29, 1991) is a Chilean former football goalkeeper.

== Career ==
He joined Coquimbo Unido youth team on 2004, where he played until 2010 before being promoted to the first team, debuting and playing 8 games on the tournament. On 2011 he joined Universidad de Chile, just before the 2011 South American U-20. On 2 December 2012 he debuted with Universidad de Chile in a match for the Copa Chile against Universidad de Concepción.

He pulled out from the football activity at the age of 28, when he played for Deportes Copiapó at the Chilean Primera B.

== Post-retirement ==
After his retirement, he went to Barcelona to get a master's degree in Sport Management at the Johan Cruyff Institute. He practiced as Manager of International Relationships of Spanish club CD Montcada until December 2020.

== Honours ==
=== Club ===
Universidad de Chile

- Primera División de Chile (3): 2011 Apertura, 2011 Clausura, 2012 Apertura
- Copa Sudamericana (1): 2011
- Copa Chile (1): 2012–13
