= Thiago Vecino =

Uruguayan footballer (born 1999)

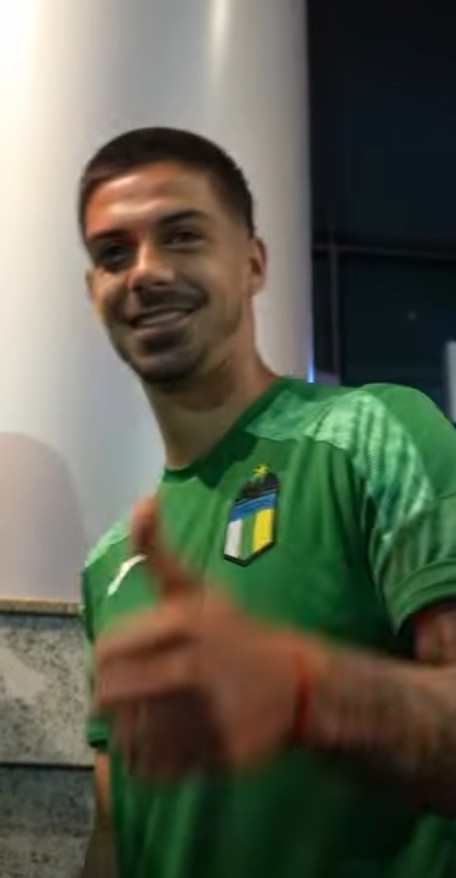
- Vecino with O'Higgins in 2026

Personal information
- Full name: Thiago Vecino Berriel
- Date of birth: 25 February 1999 (age 27)
- Place of birth: Montevideo, Uruguay
- Height: 1.83 m (6 ft 0 in)
- Position: Forward

Team information
- Current team: O'Higgins
- Number: 32

Youth career
- Covicenova del Cerro
- Nacional

Senior career*
Years	Team	Apps	(Gls)
2019–2021	Nacional	45	(7)
2022–2024	Liverpool Montevideo	47	(20)
2023	→ Unión Santa Fe (loan)	11	(0)
2024–2025	Vélez Sarsfield	8	(0)
2024	→ Huachipato (loan)	12	(6)
2025	→ Pari Nizhny Novgorod (loan)	16	(2)
2026–	O'Higgins	14	(4)

International career
2017	Uruguay U18	11	(1)
2018	Uruguay U20	11	(3)
- * Club domestic league appearances and goals as of 8 November 2025

Thiago Vecino Berriel (born 25 February 1999) is a Uruguayan professional footballer who plays as a forward for Chilean club O'Higgins. He also holds Italian citizenship.

== Club career ==
An academy graduate of Nacional, Vecino played an important part in his team's triumph at 2018 U-20 Copa Libertadores. He scored three goals from five matches in the tournament, including a brace against Sport Huancayo.

Vecino made his professional debut for Nacional on 17 August 2019, in a 1–1 draw against River Plate Montevideo. He played whole 90 minutes in the match and scored his team's only goal.

In the second half of 2024, Vecino moved to Chile and joined Huachipato on loan from Vélez Sarsfield on a one-year deal.

On 4 February 2025, Vecino moved on loan to Pari Nizhny Novgorod in Russia until the end of 2025, with an option to buy. On 1 December 2025, Vecino left Pari Nizhny Novgorod as his loan expired.

Ended his contract with Vélez Sarsfield, Vecino returned to Chile and joined O'Higgins on 24 January 2026.

== Career statistics ==
As of match played 8 November 2025

Appearances and goals by club, season and competition
Club	Season	League			Cup		Continental		Other		Total	
Club	Season	Division	Apps	Goals	Apps	Goals	Apps	Goals	Apps	Goals	Apps	Goals
Nacional	2019	Uruguayan Primera División	16	3	—		0	0	2 (Note: One appearance each in Torneo Clausura decider and championship playoff.)	0	18	3
Nacional	2020	Uruguayan Primera División	25	4	—		6 (Note: Appearances in Copa Libertadores.)	2	4 (Note: Two appearances in championship playoffs and one appearance each in Supercopa Uruguaya and Torneo Apertura decider.)	0	35	6
Nacional	2021	Uruguayan Primera División	4	0	—		1 (Note: Appearances in Copa Sudamericana.)	0	0	0	5	0
Nacional	Total		45	7	0	0	7	2	6	0	58	9
Liverpool Montevideo	2022	Uruguayan Primera División	33	14	1	0	1	0	2 (Note: One appearance and one goal in championship playoff, one appearance in Torneo Intermedio final.)	1	37	15
Liverpool Montevideo	2023	Uruguayan Primera División	14	6	0	0	0	0	3 (Note: Appearances in championship play-offs.)	1	17	7
Liverpool Montevideo	Total		47	20	1	0	1	0	5	2	54	22
Unión Santa Fe (loan)	2023	Argentine Primera División	11	0	0	0	—		—		11	0
Vélez Sarsfield	2024	Argentine Primera División	8	0	1	0	—		—		9	0
Huachipato (loan)	2024	Chilean Primera División	12	6	0	0	2	0	—		14	6
Pari Nizhny Novgorod (loan)	2024–25	Russian Premier League	9	1	—		—		2 (Note: Appearances in relegation play-offs)	0	11	1
Pari Nizhny Novgorod (loan)	2025–26	Russian Premier League	7	1	4	0	—		—		11	1
Pari Nizhny Novgorod (loan)	Total		16	2	4	0	0	0	2	0	22	2
Career total			139	35	6	0	10	2	13	2	168	39

== Honours ==
Nacional

- Uruguayan Primera División: 2019, 2020

Liverpool Montevideo

- Uruguayan Primera División: 2023
- Supercopa Uruguaya: 2024

Nacional U20

- U-20 Copa Libertadores: 2018

Individual

- Uruguayan Primera División Team of the Year: 2022
