= Santiago Amorín =

Uruguayan footballer (born 1994)

Personal information
- Full name: Santiago Amorín Calegari
- Date of birth: 9 September 1994 (age 32)
- Place of birth: Montevideo, Uruguay
- Height: 1.83 m (6 ft 0 in)
- Position: Goalkeeper

Team information
- Current team: Sportivo Bella Italia

Senior career*
Years	Team	Apps	(Gls)
2016	Progreso	1	(0)
2016–2017	Central Español	2	(0)
2017–2020	Albion F.C.	25	(0)
2020–2021	Liverpool F.C. (Montevideo)	0	(0)
2021	Villa Española	0	(0)
2021–2022	Cerrito	0	(0)
2023–	Sportivo Bella Italia		
- * Club domestic league appearances and goals as of 23 March 2024

Santiago Amorín Calegari (born 9 September 1994) is a Uruguayan footballer who plays as a goalkeeper for Sportivo Bella Italia.

== Career ==
In his youth, Amorín didn't own a pair of goalkeeper gloves, instead using a pair of fingerless motorcycle gloves he found in his brother's suitcase. He began his senior career with Progreso in 2016, making his league debut on 11 June 2016 in a 1–0 defeat to Canadian Soccer Club. He bounced around several clubs during his early career, joining Central Español in late 2016 and Albion in 2017. He settled with Albion for several seasons before departing the club ahead of the 2020 season, joining Liverpool. Ahead of the 2021 season, Amorín departed Liverpool.

Following his Liverpool stint, Amorín joined Villa Española, but terminated his contract following the 2021 Apertura tournament. He joined Cerrito for the conclusion of the 2021 season.
