= Alan Medina Silva =

Uruguayan football player (born 1998)

Alan Medina
Personal information
- Full name: Alan Damián Medina Silva
- Date of birth: 10 April 1998 (age 28)
- Place of birth: Montevideo, Uruguay
- Height: 1.71 m (5 ft 7 in)
- Position: Right winger

Team information
- Current team: Everton (on loan from León)

Youth career
- Liverpool Montevideo

Senior career*
Years	Team	Apps	(Gls)
2018–2023	Liverpool Montevideo	137	(26)
2024–	León	18	(2)
2024	→ Peñarol (loan)	10	(2)
2025–	→ Everton (loan)	26	(4)
- * Club domestic league appearances and goals as of 13 November 2025

Alan Damián Medina Silva (born 10 April 1998) is a Uruguayan professional footballer who plays as a right winger for Chilean club Everton de Viña del Mar on loan from León.

== Career ==
A youth academy graduate of Liverpool Montevideo, Medina made his professional debut on 16 September 2018 in a 0–0 draw against Fénix.

In January 2025, Medina joined Everton de Viña del Mar from Mexican club León on a two-year deal.

== Career statistics ==
=== Club ===
As of match played on 19 July 2022.

Club	Season	League			Cup		Continental		Other		Total	
Club	Season	Division	Apps	Goals	Apps	Goals	Apps	Goals	Apps	Goals	Apps	Goals
Liverpool Montevideo	2018	Uruguayan Primera División	1	0	—		—		—		1	0
Liverpool Montevideo	2019	Uruguayan Primera División	15	1	—		2 (Note: Appearances in Copa Sudamericana.)	0	0	0	17	1
Liverpool Montevideo	2020	Uruguayan Primera División	19	5	—		2	0	2 (Note: One appearance each in Supercopa Uruguaya and Championship play-off.)	1	23	6
Liverpool Montevideo	2021	Uruguayan Primera División	28	2	—		1 (Note: Appearance in Copa Libertadores.)	0	—		29	2
Liverpool Montevideo	2022	Uruguayan Primera División	18	7	0	0	2	0	—		20	7
Career total			81	15	0	0	7	0	2	1	90	16

== Honours ==
Liverpool

- Torneo Intermedio: 2019
- Supercopa Uruguaya: 2020
