= Roland Marcenaro =

Uruguayan football manager (born 1963)

Personal information
- Full name: Roland William Marcenaro Nieves
- Date of birth: 9 October 1963 (age 63)
- Place of birth: Montevideo, Uruguay
- Position: Forward

Youth career
- Juventud Victoria
- 1977–1979: Cerro
- 1979–1981: Peñarol

Senior career*
| Years | Team | Apps | (Gls) |
| 1980–1983 | Peñarol | | |
| 1984 | River Plate Montevideo | | |
| 1985 | San Luis de Quillota | | |
| 1986 | Sportivo Italiano Montevideo | | |
| 1987 | El Tanque Sisley | | |
| 1988 | Liverpool Montevideo | | |
| 1989 | Juventud Retalteca | | |
| 1990–1991 | Comunicaciones | | |
| 1992 | Lavalleja | | |
| 1993 | Fénix | | |
| 1995 | El Tanque Sisley | | |

Managerial career
- 1996–1997: Miramar Misiones (youth)
- 1996: Miramar Misiones (interim)
- 1998: Uruguay (assistant)
- 1999: River Plate Montevideo (assistant)
- 2002–2003: Miramar Misiones
- 2004: Cerro
- 2006–2009: Uruguay U17
- 2010: Miramar Misiones
- 2011: Caracas B
- 2013: Al-Rayyan (assistant)
- 2014: Al-Gharafa (assistant)
- 2015: Greece (assistant)
- 2018: Miramar Misiones
- 2019–2021: Cerrito
- 2022: Atenas de San Carlos
- 2022–2023: Cerrito
- 2025: Metropolitanos
- * Club domestic league appearances and goals

Roland William Marcenaro Nieves (born 9 October 1963) is a Uruguayan football manager and former player who played as a forward.

== Playing career ==
Marcenaro was born in Montevideo, and finished his formation with Peñarol. He made his first team debut in 1980, but failed to establish himself as a regular starter, and moved to River Plate Montevideo in 1984.

In 1986, after a year at Chilean side San Luis de Quillota, Marcenaro returned to Uruguay and joined Sportivo Italiano. He subsequently represented El Tanque Sisley and Liverpool Montevideo before moving abroad again in 1989, with Juventud Retalteca in Guatemala.

Marcenaro returned to his home country in 1992, after playing for Comunicaciones, and signed for Treinta y Tres-based side Club Lavalleja. He moved to Fénix in the following year, before retiring with El Tanque Sisley in 1995.

== Managerial career ==
Shortly after retiring, Marcenaro also began his coaching career with Miramar Misiones' youth setup. In 1996, he was an interim manager of the main squad for three matches.

Marcenaro was an assistant manager of the Uruguayan Football Association in 1998, while also working under the same role at River Plate Montevideo the following year. In 2002, he returned to managerial duties with Miramar Misiones, helping the side to achieve promotion back to the Primera División in his first season and narrowly missing out a Copa Libertadores qualification in his second.

In January 2004, Marcenaro replaced Gerardo Pelusso at the helm of Cerro. Dismissed in August, he worked at the Organización Nacional de Fútbol Infantil in 2005 before being named manager of the Uruguay under-17 national team in March 2006.

In 2010, Marcenaro returned to Miramar for a third spell as manager. He resigned on 15 November, and moved abroad to join Caracas the following March, as manager of their B-team in the Venezuelan Segunda División.

In 2013, Marcenaro worked as Diego Aguirre's assistant at Al-Rayyan. He also worked with Aguirre at Al-Gharafa in the following year, and was Sergio Markarián's assistant at the Greece national team in 2015.

In June 2018, after more than two years of inactivity and after working as an Uber driver, Marcenaro rejoined Miramar for a fourth spell. In August 2019 he took over Cerrito, and led the club back to the top tier in the 2020 season.

== Personal life ==
Marcenaro's brother Nelson was also a footballer who played as a central defender. Their uncle Óscar was also a manager, and was in charge of the Uruguay national team in the 1949 South American Championship.
