= CD Masnou =

Spanish football team

Masnou
- Full name: Club Deportiu Masnou
- Founded: 1920
- Ground: Estadi Municipal, El Masnou, Barcelona, Spain
- Capacity: 2,000
- President: (Spain) Roberto Hernández
- Head coach: (Spain) Miquel López
- League: Tercera Catalana – Group 6
- 2024–25: Segona Catalana – Group 2, 14th of 16 (relegated)
Home colours	Away colours

Club Deportiu Masnou is a Spanish football team based in El Masnou, in the province of Barcelona. Founded in 1920, it plays in Tercera Catalana – Group 6, holding home games at Estadi Municipal de El Masnou, with a capacity of 2,000 seats.

== Season to season ==
Season	Tier	Division	Place	Copa del Rey
1929–1948	—	Regional	—	
1948–49	6	2ª Reg.	5th	
1949–50	6	2ª Reg.	3rd	
1950–51	5	1ª Reg. B	16th	
1951–52	6	2ª Reg.	3rd	
1952–53	5	1ª Reg. B	18th	
1953–54	6	Liga Com.	5th	
1954–55	6	3ª Reg.		
1955–56	6	3ª Reg.		
1956–57	6	3ª Reg.		
1957–58	6	3ª Reg.		
1958–59	6	3ª Reg.		
1959–60	6	3ª Reg.		
1960–61	6	3ª Reg.		
1961–62	5	2ª Reg.		
1962–63	5	2ª Reg.	3rd	
1963–64	5	2ª Reg.	14th	
1964–65	5	2ª Reg.	2nd	
1965–66	4	1ª Reg.	17th	
1966–67	4	1ª Reg.	7th	

Season	Tier	Division	Place	Copa del Rey
1967–68	4	1ª Reg.	16th	
1968–69	5	1ª Reg.	1st	
1969–70	4	Reg. Pref.	4th	
1970–71	4	Reg. Pref.	4th	
1971–72	4	Reg. Pref.	1st	
1972–73	3	3ª	18th	First round
1973–74	4	Reg. Pref.	6th	
1974–75	4	Reg. Pref.	1st	
1975–76	3	3ª	19th	Second round
1976–77	4	Reg. Pref.	11th	
1977–78	4	3ª	17th	First round
1978–79	4	3ª	18th	First round
1979–80	4	3ª	18th	Second round
1980–81	4	3ª	20th	
1981–82	5	Reg. Pref.	6th	
1982–83	5	Reg. Pref.	5th	
1983–84	5	Reg. Pref.	4th	
1984–85	5	Reg. Pref.	2nd	
1985–86	4	3ª	16th	
1986–87	5	Reg. Pref.	13th	

Season	Tier	Division	Place	Copa del Rey
1987–88	5	Reg. Pref.	12th	
1988–89	5	Reg. Pref.	7th	
1989–90	5	Reg. Pref.	10th	
1990–91	5	Reg. Pref.	8th	
1991–92	5	1ª Cat.	17th	
1992–93	6	Pref. Terr.	16th	
1993–94	7	1ª Terr.	1st	
1994–95	6	Pref. Terr.	2nd	
1995–96	6	Pref. Terr.	1st	
1996–97	5	1ª Cat.	7th	
1997–98	5	1ª Cat.	13th	
1998–99	5	1ª Cat.	7th	
1999–2000	5	1ª Cat.	10th	
2000–01	5	1ª Cat.	10th	
2001–02	5	1ª Cat.	11th	
2002–03	5	1ª Cat.	8th	
2003–04	5	1ª Cat.	4th	
2004–05	5	1ª Cat.	5th	
2005–06	5	1ª Cat.	2nd	
2006–07	4	3ª	17th	

Season	Tier	Division	Place	Copa del Rey
2007–08	4	3ª	20th	
2008–09	5	1ª Cat.	6th	
2009–10	5	1ª Cat.	3rd	
2010–11	4	3ª	16th	
2011–12	4	3ª	20th	
2012–13	5	1ª Cat.	1st	
2013–14	4	3ª	13th	
2014–15	4	3ª	9th	
2015–16	4	3ª	20th	
2016–17	5	1ª Cat.	14th	
2017–18	6	2ª Cat.	8th	
2018–19	6	2ª Cat.	10th	
2019–20	6	2ª Cat.	5th	
2020–21	6	2ª Cat.	4th	
2021–22	7	2ª Cat.	4th	
2022–23	7	2ª Cat.	3rd	
2023–24	8	2ª Cat.	3rd	
2024–25	8	2ª Cat.	14th	
2025–26	9	3ª Cat.		

- 14 seasons in Tercera División
