= Miramar Misiones =

Association football club in Uruguay

- Full name: Club Sportivo Miramar Misiones
- Nicknames: Cebritas; Monitos; Milrayitas
- Founded: 25 June 1980; 45 years ago
- Ground: Parque Luis Méndez Piana, Montevideo, Uruguay
- Capacity: 6,500
- Chairman: Javier Barrios
- Coach: Bernardo Giordano (caretaker)
- League: Uruguayan Segunda División
- 2025: Liga AUF Uruguaya, 16th of 16 (relegated by average)
- Website: www.miramarmisiones.com
Home colours	Away colours

Club Sportivo Miramar Misiones, usually known simply as Miramar Misiones is a Uruguayan football club based in Montevideo. The club was formed from the merger of two clubs: Miramar (founded on 17 October 1915) and Misiones (founded on 26 March 1906), in June 1980. As part of the merger, the new strip for the new club was a mixture of those of the previous two clubs. The home strip (white and black) is the old Miramar strip, and the away strip was the one used by Misiones. What made this merger notable was that Miramar and Misiones were local derby rivals, having both originated in the same neighbourhood of Montevideo.

Previous to the creation of this club, Miramar also merged with legendary club Albion in 1976, forming 'Albion Miramar'. However, this entity lasted for only 2 seasons.

== Current squad ==
As of 23 August 2025

Note: Flags indicate national team as defined under FIFA eligibility rules; some limited exceptions apply. Players may hold more than one non-FIFA nationality.

No.	Pos.	Nation	Player
3	DF	URU	Sebastián Diana
4	DF	URU	Pablo López
6	DF	URU	Santiago Corbo
7	FW	COL	Ignacio Yepez
8	FW	URU	Axel Pandiani
10	MF	URU	Gastón Ramírez
11	MF	URU	Anthony Sosa
12	GK	URU	Lukas González
13	DF	URU	Camilo Sánchez
14	MF	URU	Guzmán Pereira
15	DF	URU	Federico Alonso
16	DF	URU	Mauricio Gómez
17	FW	ARG	Emiliano Saliadarre

No.	Pos.	Nation	Player
18	MF	ARG	Fabricio Tirado
19	DF	URU	Andrés Olivera
20	DF	URU	Ayrton Castro
21	FW	URU	Agustín Rodríguez
22	MF	URU	Oscar Díaz
23	MF	URU	Diego Núñez
24	FW	URU	Facundo Silvera
25	FW	URU	Denis Olivera
26	FW	ARG	Juan Facundo Crisafi
27	DF	URU	Silvio López
29	DF	URU	Jorge Ayala
30	GK	COL	Juan Moreno
31	FW	URU	Sebastián da Silva

== Managers ==
- (Uruguay) Jorge González (1 January 1996 – 31 December 1996)
- (Uruguay) Roland Marcenaro (1 January 2000 – 31 December 2003)
- (Uruguay) Manuel Keosseián (1 June 2005 – 24 October 2005)
- (Uruguay) Julio Antúnez (24 May 2010 – 30 June 2010)
- (Uruguay) Roland Marcenaro (9 July 2010 – 16 November 2010)
- (Uruguay) Carlos Manta (15 August 2011 – 3 June 2013)
- (Uruguay) Luis Duarte (3 June 2013 – 7 October 2013)
- (Uruguay) Gonzalo de los Santos (9 October 2013 – 24 February 2014)
- (Uruguay) Daniel Sánchez (25 February, 2014–14)
- (Uruguay) Carlos María Moralez (2014)

== Presidents ==
- (Uruguay) Don Carlos Gonzales (1980)
- (Uruguay) Hector Camera (1990)
- (Uruguay) Eduardo Felipez (2000)
- (Uruguay) Hugo Casada (2005)
- (Uruguay) Eugenio Gambetta Gabin (2015)

== Titles ==
- Segunda División: 3
  - 1942, 1953 (as Miramar), 1986, 2023
- Divisional Intermedia: 2
  - 1917, (Note: Title won by its predecessor, "Misiones F.C.".) 1935, (Note: Title won by its predecessor, "Club Sportivo Miramar"), 1971
- Segunda División Amateur (3rd level): 1
  - 1974 (as Misiones)
- Divisional Extra (3rd level): 2
  - 1917, 1937 (as Miramar)
- Divisional Extra (4th level): 1
  - 1953 (as Misiones)
