= C.A. Rentistas =

Uruguayan football club

Rentistas
- Full name: Club Atlético Rentistas
- Nicknames: Bichos Colorados; Bicheros; Rojos; El Renta
- Founded: March 26, 1933; 93 years ago
- Ground: Estadio Complejo Rentistas
- Capacity: 6,500
- Chairman: Alvaro Astray
- Coach: Rodolfo Neme
- League: Segunda División
- 2025: Segunda División, 8th of 14
| Home colours | Away colours | Third colours |

Club Atlético Rentistas, known simply as Rentistas is a Uruguayan professional football club based in Cerrito de la Victoria, Montevideo. Founded in 1933, the club competes in the Uruguayan Segunda División.

== History ==
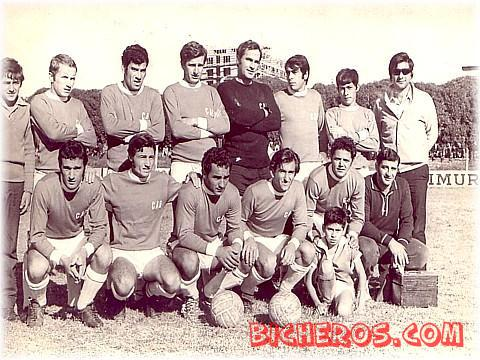
C.A. Rentistas in 1971.

In 1971, Rentistas was the first team of the neighbourhood (barrio) Cerrito that achieved promotion to the Uruguayan first division. They remained there until 1980. Rentistas returned to the first division on three other occasions (1989–92, 1997–01, 2004–07).

In 1998 Rentistas inaugurated their new stadium, Complejo Rentistas. The club finished second in the Clausura and qualified for the CONMEBOL Cup 1999.

=== Controversies ===
Rentistas is known for their involvement in third-party ownership. The transfer fee of Hulk was channeled through the club.

== Rivalries ==
The neighbourhood has two sports clubs, who share a large rivalry; the Clásico del Cerrito is contested with CS Cerrito.

== Current squad ==
As of 15 August 2024

Note: Flags indicate national team as defined under FIFA eligibility rules; some limited exceptions apply. Players may hold more than one non-FIFA nationality.

| No. | Pos. | Nation | Player |
|---|---|---|---|
| 1 | GK | URU | Lucas Machado |
| 3 | DF | URU | Nicolás Ramos (on loan from Nacional) |
| 5 | MF | URU | Ignacio Neira |
| 6 | DF | URU | Federico Pardiñas |
| 7 | FW | URU | Kevin Ramírez |
| 8 | MF | URU | Rodrigo Viera |
| 10 | MF | URU | Michel Sosa |
| 11 | FW | URU | Santiago Ramírez |
| 12 | GK | URU | Martín Coirolo |
| 13 | GK | URU | Carlos Techera |
| 14 | DF | URU | Facundo Vega |
| 15 | MF | URU | Jean Franco Martínez |
| 16 | DF | URU | Álex de Freitas |

| No. | Pos. | Nation | Player |
|---|---|---|---|
| 17 | MF | URU | Jairo Villalpando |
| 18 | MF | URU | Sebastián Cáceres |
| 20 | DF | URU | Lautaro Dufur |
| 21 | DF | URU | Mauro Alfonso (on loan from Boston River) |
| 22 | MF | ARG | Mateo Seoane (on loan from Vélez Sarsfield) |
| 23 | FW | URU | Axel Méndez (on loan from Nacional) |
| 24 | MF | URU | Luciano Inverso (on loan from Nacional) |
| 25 | DF | URU | Agustín García |
| 26 | MF | URU | Guillermo Oroño (on loan from River Plate Montevideo) |
| 27 | FW | ARG | Carlos Tombolini |
| 33 | FW | URU | Bruno Betancor (on loan from Peñarol) |
| — | FW | URU | Santiago Vigorito |

=== Out on loan ===
Note: Flags indicate national team as defined under FIFA eligibility rules; some limited exceptions apply. Players may hold more than one non-FIFA nationality.

| No. | Pos. | Nation | Player |
|---|---|---|---|
| — | FW | URU | Enzo Facchin (at UD Logroñés until 30 June 2025) |

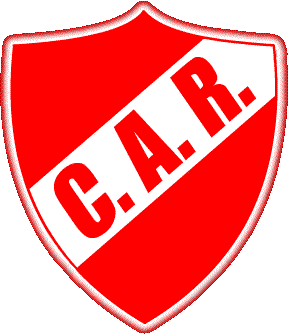
Another logo version.

== Managers ==
- (Uruguay) Geordy Sequeiros
- (Uruguay) Manuel Keosseian
- (Uruguay) Martín Lasarte (1998–99)
- (Uruguay) Carlos Manta (1 Jan 2005 – 18 September 2006)
- (Uruguay) Álvaro Gutiérrez (2006–07)
- (Uruguay) (Peru) Julio César Balerio (18 September 2006 – 1 June 2007), (28 July 2011 – 7 November 2011)
- (Uruguay) Edgardo Arias (8 Nov 2011 – 30 June 2012)
- (Uruguay) Adolfo Barán (16 July 2012–Dec 14)
- (Uruguay) Manuel Keosseián (Jan 2015–June 2015)
- (Uruguay) Valentín Villazán (June 2015–)

== Titles ==
- Primera División Apertura phase:

2020 Apertura

- Segunda División Uruguay: 4

1971, 1988, 1996, 2011

- Divisional Intermedia: 1

1966
