= 2026 Supercopa Uruguaya =

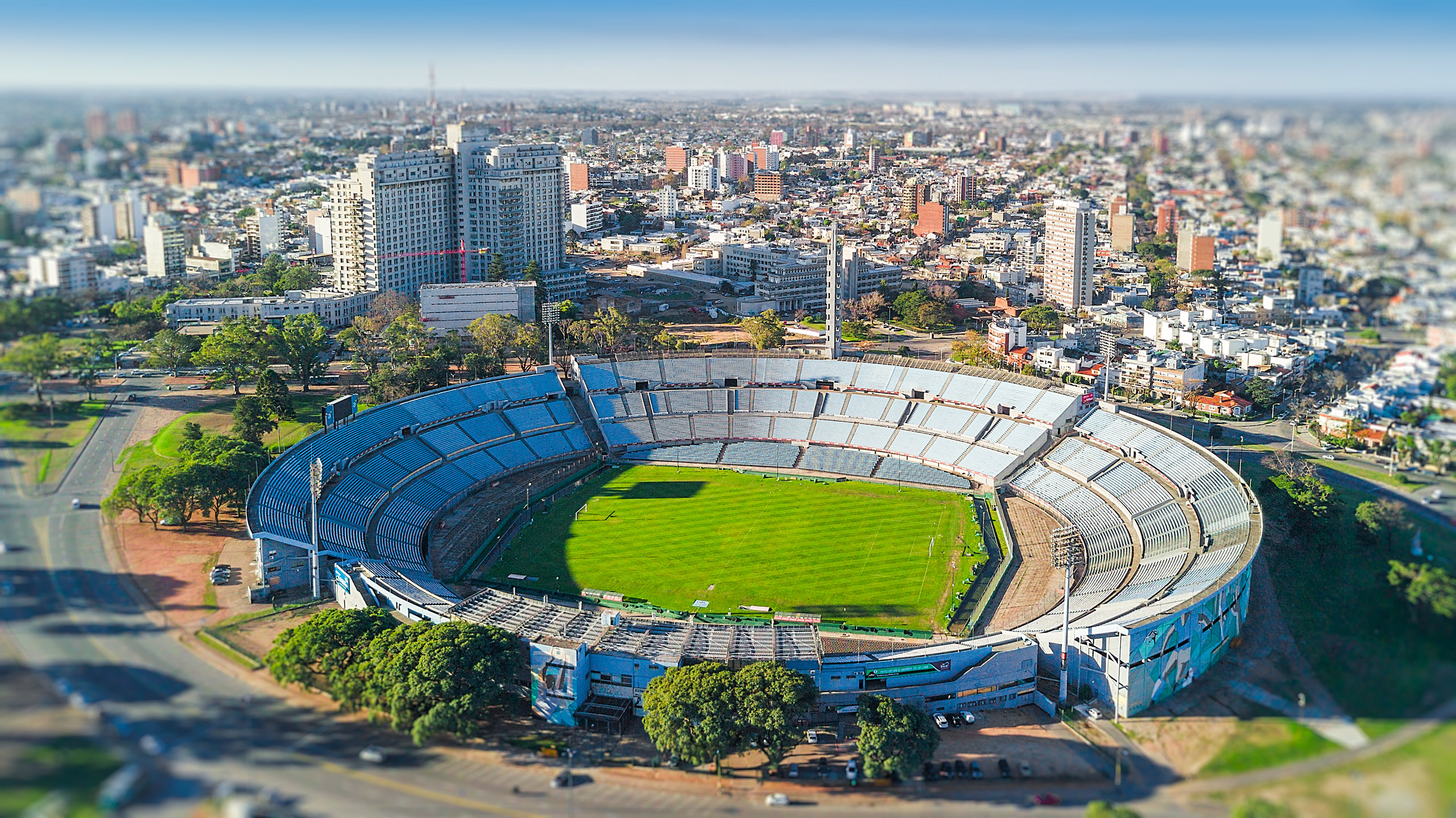
- Estadio Centenario hosted the match
| Peñarol | Nacional |
| 0 | 0 |
- After extra time. Peñarol won 4–2 on penalties.
- Date: 1 February 2026
- Venue: Estadio Centenario, Montevideo
- Referee: Esteban Ostojich

The 2026 Supercopa Uruguaya was the ninth edition of the Supercopa Uruguaya, Uruguay's football super cup. It was held on 1 February 2026 between the 2025 Liga AUF Uruguaya champions Nacional and the 2025 Torneo Intermedio winners Peñarol at Estadio Centenario in Montevideo.

The match ended with Peñarol winning their third Supercopa Uruguaya title by defeating Nacional 4–2 on penalty kicks following a 0–0 draw after extra time.

== Teams ==
The Supercopa Uruguaya is contested by the champions of the Liga AUF Uruguaya and the Torneo Intermedio winners of the previous year, which were Nacional and Peñarol, respectively.

This was the fourth time that both teams faced each other in a Supercopa Uruguaya match, having played the first two editions of the competition as well as the previous one. Peñarol won the title in 2018, defeating Nacional 3–1, while Nacional won in 2019 and 2025.

| Team | Qualification | Previous appearances (bold indicates winners) |
|---|---|---|
| Nacional | 2025 Liga AUF Uruguaya champions | 6 (2018, **2019**, 2020, **2021**, 2023, **2025**) |
| Peñarol | 2025 Torneo Intermedio winners | 4 (**2018**, 2019, **2022**, 2025) |

== Details ==
1 February 2026
20:00 UTC−3

| Peñarol | 0–0 (a.e.t.) | Nacional |
|---|---|---|
| | Report |
Penalties
| Batista (penalty scored); Fernández (penalty scored); Remedi (penalty scored); Madruga (penalty scored) | 4–2 | (penalty scored) Verón Lupi; (penalty missed) Dos Santos; (penalty missed) De los Santos; (penalty scored) Coates |

Estadio Centenario, Montevideo
Referee: Esteban Ostojich

| **Peñarol** | **Nacional** |

| GK | 1 | (Uruguay) Sebastián Britos |
| RB | 4 | (Uruguay) Emanuel Gularte | (yellow card) 9' |
| CB | 34 | (Uruguay) Nahuel Herrera | | (substituted off) 46' |
| CB | 6 | (Uruguay) Lucas Ferreira | | (substituted off) 59' |
| LB | 2 | (Argentina) Franco Escobar | (yellow card) 45' | (substituted off) 90' |
| DM | 5 | (Argentina) Eric Remedi |
| DM | 21 | (Uruguay) Jesús Trindade |
| CM | 32 | (Uruguay) Leandro Umpiérrez | (red card) 51' |
| LM | 23 | (Argentina) Gastón Togni | | (substituted off) 59' |
| AM | 10 | (Uruguay) Leonardo Fernández | (yellow card) 26' |
| CF | 19 | (Uruguay) Matías Arezo | | (substituted off) 76' |
Substitutes:
| GK | 12 | (Uruguay) Leandro Díaz |
| DF | 20 | (Uruguay) Kevin Rodríguez | | (substituted on) 46' |
| DF | 25 | (Uruguay) Matías González |
| DF | 26 | (Uruguay) Andrés Madruga | (yellow card) 59' | (substituted on) 59' |
| DF | 93 | (Uruguay) Diego Laxalt | | (substituted on) 90' |
| MF | 13 | (Uruguay) Eduardo Darias | | (substituted on) 59' (substituted off) 108' |
| MF | 30 | (Uruguay) Stiven Muhlethaler |
| MF | 80 | (Uruguay) Franco González | | (substituted on) 108' |
| FW | 9 | (Uruguay) Facundo Batista | | (substituted on) 76' |
| FW | 40 | (Uruguay) Brandon Álvarez |
Manager:
(Uruguay) Diego Aguirre

| GK | 12 | (Panama) Luis Mejía |
| RB | 13 | (Uruguay) Emiliano Ancheta | | (substituted off) 90+2' |
| CB | 4 | (Uruguay) Sebastián Coates | (yellow card) 98' |
| CB | 29 | (Colombia) Julián Millán |
| LB | 33 | (Colombia) Juan Pablo Patiño | | (substituted off) 90' |
| CM | 8 | (Uruguay) Christian Oliva | (yellow card) 26' | (substituted off) 63' |
| RM | 6 | (Uruguay) Luciano Boggio | | (substituted off) 111' |
| LM | 23 | (Uruguay) Lucas Rodríguez |
| RW | 7 | (Uruguay) Nicolás López | | (substituted off) 63' |
| LW | 20 | (Uruguay) Gonzalo Carneiro | (yellow card) 25' (yellow-red card) 53' |
| CF | 9 | (Uruguay) Maximiliano Gómez | | (substituted off) 90+2' |
Substitutes:
| GK | 25 | (Uruguay) Ignacio Suárez | (red card) 120' |
| DF | 5 | (Uruguay) Juan Pintado | | (substituted on) 90+2' |
| DF | 15 | (Uruguay) Paolo Calione |
| DF | 77 | (Uruguay) Nicolás Rodríguez |
| MF | 10 | (Uruguay) Agustín Dos Santos | | (substituted on) 111' |
| MF | 14 | (Uruguay) Nicolás Lodeiro |
| MF | 34 | (Uruguay) Federico Bais | | (substituted on) 90' |
| FW | 11 | (Uruguay) Maximiliano Silvera | | (substituted on) 63' |
| FW | 19 | (Uruguay) Juan Cruz de los Santos | | (substituted on) 63' |
| FW | 27 | (Argentina) Tomás Verón Lupi | | (substituted on) 90+2' |
Manager:
(Brazil) Jadson Viera

Assistant referees:
Nicolás Tarán
Andrés Nievas
Fourth official:
Esteban Guerra
Video assistant referee:
Leodán González
Assistant video assistant referees:
Yimmy Álvarez
Richard Trinidad

**Match rules**

- 90 minutes.
- 30 minutes of extra time if necessary.
- Penalty shoot-out if scores still level.
- Ten named substitutes.
- Maximum of five substitutions.
