= 2025 Supercopa Uruguaya =

2025 Supercopa Uruguaya 250 Años de la Ciudad de Rosario
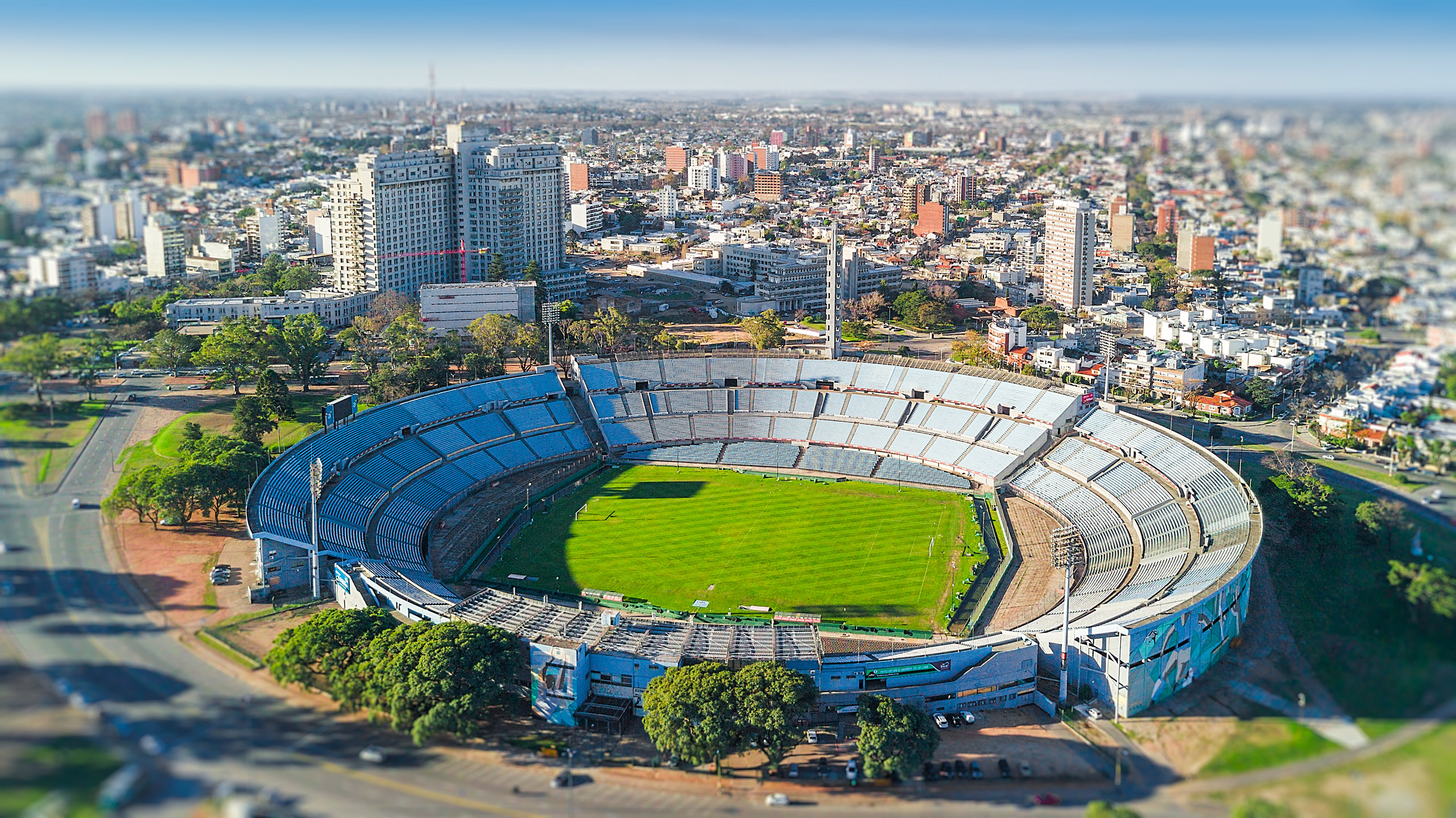
- Estadio Centenario hosted the match.
Nacional	Peñarol
2	1
- Date: 26 January 2025
- Venue: Estadio Centenario, Montevideo
- Referee: Javier Burgos

The 2025 Supercopa Uruguaya, officially named 2025 Supercopa Uruguaya – 250 Años de la Ciudad de Rosario, was the eighth edition of the Supercopa Uruguaya, Uruguay's football super cup. It was held on 26 January 2025 between the 2024 Primera División champions Peñarol and the 2024 Torneo Intermedio winners Nacional at Estadio Centenario in Montevideo.

In the match, Nacional defeated Peñarol 2–1 to win their third Supercopa Uruguaya title.

== Teams ==
The Supercopa Uruguaya was contested by the champions of the Primera División and the Torneo Intermedio winners of the previous year, which were Peñarol and Nacional, respectively.

This was the third time that both teams faced each other in a Supercopa Uruguaya match, having played the first two editions of the competition. Peñarol won the title in 2018, defeating Nacional 3–1, while in 2019, Nacional beat Peñarol on penalties following a 1–1 draw after extra time.

Team	Qualification	Previous appearances (bold indicates winners)
Peñarol	2024 Primera División champions	3 (**2018**, 2019, **2022**)
Nacional	2024 Intermedio winners	5 (2018, **2019**, 2020, **2021**, 2023)

== Details ==
26 January 2025
20:30 UTC−3

Nacional	2–1	Peñarol
López 38' (pen.); Recoba 44'	Report	García 71'

Estadio Centenario, Montevideo
Referee: Javier Burgos

**Nacional**	**Peñarol**

GK	12	(Panama) Luis Mejía
RB	19	(Uruguay) Lucas Morales	(yellow card) 90+9'
CB	4	(Uruguay) Sebastián Coates	(yellow card) 20'
CB	29	(Colombia) Julián Millán		(substituted off) 80'
LB	11	(Argentina) Gabriel Báez
CM	8	(Uruguay) Christian Oliva
RM	77	(Uruguay) Nicolás Rodríguez	(yellow card) 28'	(substituted off) 61'
LM	28	(Uruguay) Franco Catarozzi		(substituted off) 61'
RW	7	(Uruguay) Nicolás López	(red card) 90+5'
LW	18	(Uruguay) Jeremía Recoba		(substituted off) 71'
CF	9	(Uruguay) Bruno Damiani		(substituted off) 71'
Substitutes:
GK	40	(Uruguay) Diego Capdevila
DF	2	(Uruguay) Mateo Rivero
DF	13	(Uruguay) Emiliano Ancheta
DF	23	(Uruguay) Diego Polenta		(substituted on) 80'
MF	5	(Uruguay) Yonatan Rodríguez
MF	10	(Uruguay) Mauricio Pereyra
MF	22	(Venezuela) Rómulo Otero		(substituted on) 71'
MF	31	(Uruguay) Jairo Amaro	(yellow card) 78'	(substituted on) 61'
FW	16	(Uruguay) Lucas Villalba		(substituted on) 61'
FW	76	(Colombia) Diego Herazo	(red card) 90+5'	(substituted on) 71'
Manager:
(Uruguay) Martín Lasarte

GK	12	(Uruguay) Guillermo de Amores
RB	22	(Uruguay) Damián Suárez	(yellow card) 18'	(substituted off) 46'
CB	23	(Uruguay) Javier Méndez
CB	2	(Brazil) Léo Coelho	(yellow card) 41'
LB	15	(Uruguay) Maximiliano Olivera
RM	6	(Uruguay) Rodrigo Pérez	(red card) 90+5'
CM	13	(Uruguay) Eduardo Darias	(yellow card) 24'	(substituted off) 59'
CM	25	(Uruguay) Jaime Báez		(substituted off) 80'
LM	27	(Uruguay) Lucas Hernández		(substituted off) 46'
AM	10	(Uruguay) Leonardo Fernández
CF	11	(Uruguay) Maximiliano Silvera		(substituted off) 80'
Substitutes:
GK	29	(Uruguay) Martín Campaña
DF	18	(Uruguay) Camilo Mayada
DF	20	(Uruguay) Pedro Milans	(yellow card) 82'	(substituted on) 46'
DF	34	(Uruguay) Nahuel Herrera
MF	5	(Uruguay) Ignacio Sosa
MF	7	(Uruguay) Javier Cabrera	(red card) 90+5'	(substituted on) 59'
MF	16	(Uruguay) Tomás Olase
FW	9	(Uruguay) Felipe Avenatti		(substituted on) 80'
FW	50	(Uruguay) Diego García		(substituted on) 46'
FW	80	(Uruguay) David Terans		(substituted on) 80'
Manager:
(Uruguay) Diego Aguirre

Assistant referees:
Andrés Nievas
Alberto Píriz
Fourth official:
Federico Arman
Video assistant referee:
Diego Dunajec
Assistant video assistant referees:
Santiago Motta
Pablo Llarena

**Match rules**

- 90 minutes.
- 30 minutes of extra time if necessary.
- Penalty shoot-out if scores still level.
- Ten named substitutes.
- Maximum of five substitutions.
