= Felipe Carballo =

Uruguayan footballer (born 1996)

Personal information
- Full name: Felipe Ignacio Carballo Ares
- Date of birth: 4 October 1996 (age 30)
- Place of birth: Montevideo, Uruguay
- Height: 1.77 m (5 ft 9 1/2 in)
- Position: Defensive midfielder

Youth career
- Montevideo Belgrano
- Nacional

Senior career*
Years	Team	Apps	(Gls)
2016–2017	Nacional	22	(4)
2017–2021	Sevilla B	32	(0)
2019–2020	→ Nacional (loan)	59	(9)
2021–2022	Nacional	56	(8)
2023–2026	Grêmio	31	(1)
2024–2025	→ New York Red Bulls (loan)	24	(0)
2025	→ Portland Timbers (loan)	2	(0)

International career^{‡}
2023–	Uruguay	7	(0)
- * Club domestic league appearances and goals as of 18 December 2025 ‡ National team caps and goals as of 22 November 2023

Felipe Ignacio Carballo Ares (born 4 October 1996) is a Uruguayan professional footballer who plays as a defensive midfielder.

== Club career ==
=== Nacional ===
Born in Montevideo, Carballo was a Nacional youth graduate. He made his first team – and Primera División – debut on 28 February 2016, starting in a 0–2 away loss against Plaza Colonia.

Carballo scored his first professional goal on 10 April 2016, netting his team's third in a 4–2 away win against Defensor Sporting. After contributing with ten appearances, he returned to the youth side ahead of the 2016 season, but was included in the first team again in 2017.

=== Sevilla ===
On 29 August 2017, Carballo signed a five-year contract with Sevilla FC, being assigned to the reserves in Segunda División. He was sold for a fee around 2.5 million euros.

=== Return to Nacional ===
On 18 January 2019, Carballo was loaned out to his former club Nacional until the end of 2019. The loan spell was later extended for one further year. On 23 April 2019, Carballo scored his first goal in Copa Libertadores, helping Nacional to a 1-0 victory over Atlético Mineiro in a match played in Belo Horizonte. On 12 March 2020, Carballo scored another game winning goal in a 1-0 win over Estudiantes de Mérida in a Copa Libertadores match played at Estadio Gran Parque Central. Carballo was an important player for Nacional over the next several years, helping them to various league titles.

On 9 January 2021, Carballo signed a permanent three-year deal with Nacional. During December 2022, he was selected as the Uruguayan Primera División Player of the Year, during the season he appeared in 35 league matches scoring 8 goals, helping Nacional to its 49th league title.

=== Grêmio ===
On 20 December 2022, Grêmio announced the signing of Carballo on a contract until 2026. He made his debut for Grêmio on 17 January 2023, entering as a substitute in a 4–1 victory over São Luiz, during the 2023 Recopa Gaúcha. On 5 March 2023, he scored his first goal for Grêmio in a 2–1 victory over Internacional. On 27 August 2023, Carballo scored his first goal in the Campeonato Brasileiro Série A in Gremio's 3-0 victory over Cruzeiro.

==== Loans to New York Red Bulls and Portland Timbers ====
On 16 August 2024, Carballo was loaned to Major League Soccer side New York Red Bulls. On 29 October 2024, Carballo scored his first goal for New York in a 1-0 victory over Columbus Crew in the MLS Cup Playoffs. On 23 November 2024, Carballo opened the scoring for New York in a 2-0 victory over New York City FC, helping Red Bulls to advance to the Eastern Conference Final.

Red Bulls opted not to renew Carballo's loan in July 2025, which later saw him continue his loan spell in MLS by joining Portland Timbers on 14 August 2025.

== International career ==
On 21 October 2022, Carballo was named in Uruguay's 55-man preliminary squad for the 2022 FIFA World Cup. On 24 March 2023, he made his debut for Uruguay in a 1-1 draw with Japan, coming on for Manuel Ugarte.

== Career statistics ==
=== Club ===
As of 11 August 2024

Appearances and goals by club, season and competition
Club	Season	League			Cup		Other		Total	
Club	Season	Division	Apps	Goals	Apps	Goals	Apps	Goals	Apps	Goals
Nacional	2015–16	Uruguayan Primera División	10	1	0	0	7 (Note: Appearances in Copa Libertadores)	0	17	1
Nacional	2016	Uruguayan Primera División	1	0	0	0	0	0	1	0
Nacional	2017	Uruguayan Primera División	11	3	0	0	3	0	14	3
Nacional	Total		22	4	0	0	10	0	32	4
Sevilla Atlético	2017–18	Segunda División	15	0	0	0	0	0	15	0
Sevilla Atlético	2018–19	Segunda División B	17	0	0	0	0	0	17	0
Total			32	0	0	0	0	0	32	0
Nacional	2019	Uruguayan Primera División	23	3	1	0	6	1	30	4
Nacional	2020	Uruguayan Primera División	36	6	1	1	7	1	44	8
Nacional	2021	Uruguayan Primera División	21	0	1	0	6	0	28	0
Nacional	2022	Uruguayan Primera División	35	8	0	0	9	0	44	8
Nacional	Total		115	17	3	1	28	2	146	20
Grêmio	2023	Brasileiro Série A	22	1	17 (Note: 10 Appearance(s) and 1 goal in Campeonato Gaúcho and 7 in Copa do Brasil)	1	0	0	39	2
Grêmio	2024	Brasileiro Série A	9	0	3 (Note: 3 Appearance(s) in Copa do Brasil)	0	3	0	15	0
Grêmio	Total		31	1	20	1	3	0	54	2
New York Red Bulls	2024	Major League Soccer	8	0	0	0	3 (Note: Appearances in MLS Cup Playoffs)	2	11	2
New York Red Bulls	2025	Major League Soccer	16	0	0	0	0	0	16	0
Total			24	0	0	0	3	2	27	2
Career totals			224	22	23	2	44	4	291	28

=== International ===
As of 22 November 2023

Appearances and goals by national team and year
National team	Year	Apps	Goals
Uruguay	2023	7	0
Total		7	0

== Honours ==
=== Club ===
Nacional

- Uruguayan Primera División: 2016, 2019, 2020, 2022
- Supercopa Uruguaya:2019, 2021

Grêmio

- Campeonato Gaúcho: 2023, 2024
- Recopa Gaúcha: 2023

Individual

- Uruguayan Primera División Player of the Year: 2022
