= Guillermo Centurión =

Uruguayan football player (born 2001)

Personal information
- Full name: Guillermo Christian Centurión Elizalde
- Date of birth: 23 July 2001 (age 25)
- Place of birth: Young, Uruguay
- Height: 1.81 m (5 ft 11 in)
- Position: Goalkeeper

Team information
- Current team: Bollullos

Youth career
- Nacional

Senior career*
| Years | Team | Apps | (Gls) |
| 2021–2022 | Nacional | 0 | (0) |
| 2021 | → Villa Española (loan) | 8 | (0) |
| 2023 | Cerro | 0 | (0) |
| 2023–2025 | Recreativo Huelva | 1 | (0) |
| 2025– | Bollullos | 10 | (0) |
- * Club domestic league appearances and goals as of 8 November 2025

Guillermo Christian Centurión Elizalde (born 23 July 2001) is a Uruguayan professional footballer who plays as a goalkeeper for Spanish Tercera Federación club Bollullos.

== Club career ==
Centurión is a youth academy graduate of Nacional. He made his professional debut on 15 January 2021 in the Torneo Intermedio final against Montevideo Wanderers.

In August 2021, Centurión joined Villa Española on a short-term loan deal until the end of the year.

== International career ==
Centurión has received call-ups from the Uruguay under-20 team for training camps.

== Career statistics ==
As of 18 October 2022

Appearances and goals by club, season and competition
| Club | Season | League | | | Cup | | Continental | | Other | | Total | |
| Club | Season | Division | Apps | Goals | Apps | Goals | Apps | Goals | Apps | Goals | Apps | Goals |
|---|---|---|---|---|---|---|---|---|---|---|---|---|
| Nacional | 2020 | Uruguayan Primera División | 0 | 0 | — | | 0 | 0 | 1 (Note: Appearance in Torneo Intermedio final.) | 0 | 1 | 0 |
| Nacional | 2021 | Uruguayan Primera División | 0 | 0 | — | | 2 (Note: Appearances in Copa Libertadores.) | 0 | 0 | 0 | 2 | 0 |
| Nacional | 2022 | Uruguayan Primera División | 0 | 0 | 0 | 0 | 0 | 0 | 0 | 0 | 0 | 0 |
| Nacional | Total | | 0 | 0 | 0 | 0 | 2 | 0 | 1 | 0 | 3 | 0 |
| Villa Española (loan) | 2021 | Uruguayan Primera División | 8 | 0 | — | | — | | — | | 8 | 0 |
| Career total | | | 8 | 0 | 0 | 0 | 2 | 0 | 1 | 0 | 11 | 0 |

== Honours ==
Nacional

- Uruguayan Primera División: 2020
- Supercopa Uruguaya: 2021
