= Álvaro Pereira =

Uruguayan footballer (born 1985)

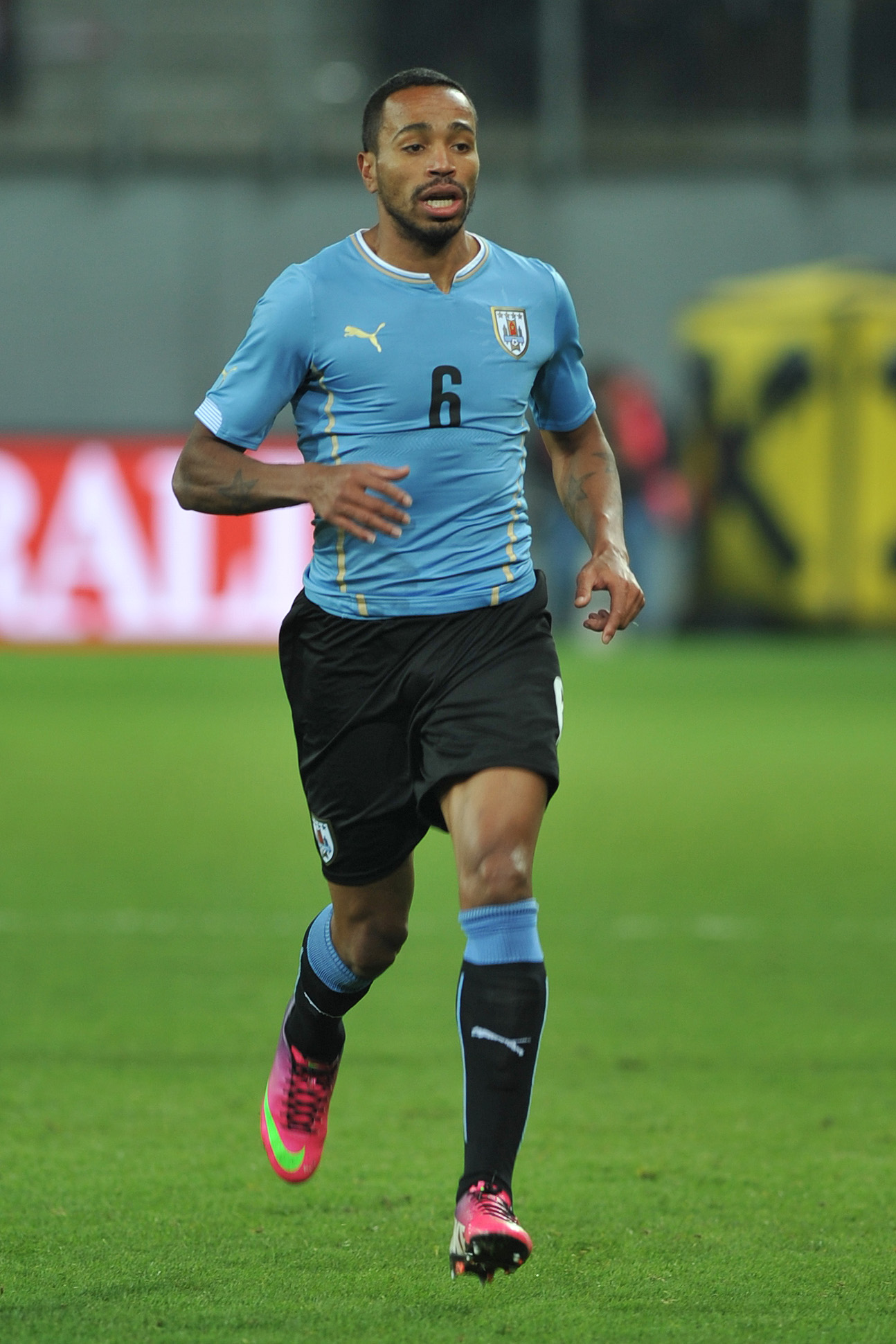
- Pereira with Uruguay in 2014

Personal information
- Full name: Álvaro Daniel Pereira Barragán
- Date of birth: 28 November 1985 (age 40)
- Place of birth: Montevideo, Uruguay
- Height: 1.82 m (6 ft 0 in)
- Position: Wing-back

Team information
- Current team: Tijuana (assistant)

Senior career*
Years	Team	Apps	(Gls)
2003–2004	Miramar Misiones	28	(1)
2005–2007	Quilmes	33	(0)
2007–2008	Argentinos Juniors	35	(11)
2008–2009	CFR Cluj	29	(1)
2009–2012	Porto	72	(2)
2012–2015	Inter Milan	33	(1)
2014	→ São Paulo (loan)	32	(1)
2015	→ Estudiantes (loan)	24	(2)
2016–2018	Estudiantes	0	(0)
2016	→ Getafe (loan)	6	(0)
2016–2018	→ Cerro Porteño (loan)	24	(1)
2019	Nacional	5	(0)
2020	River Plate Asunción	3	(0)
2020	Sereď	1	(0)
2021	Estudiantes Mérida	6	(0)
Total		331	(20)

International career
2008–2016	Uruguay	83	(7)

Managerial career
- 2026–: Tijuana (assistant)
Medal record
Representing Uruguay
Copa América
Winner	2011 Argentina
- * Club domestic league appearances and goals

Álvaro Daniel Pereira Barragán (Spanish pronunciation: [ˈalβaɾo peˈɾejɾa]; born 28 November 1985) is a Uruguayan former professional footballer. Mainly a left-back, he could perform equally as a left midfielder.

After starting out at Miramar Misiones he went on to play for a host of teams in several countries, mainly Porto and Inter Milan, winning eight major titles with the former club while appearing in 118 competitive matches (three goals).

A Uruguay international since 2008, Pereira represented his country in two World Cups and three Copa Américas, earning 83 caps and winning the 2011 edition of the latter tournament.

== Club career ==
=== Early years ===
Born in Montevideo, Pereira began his career with Miramar Misiones in 2003, moving to Argentina with Quilmes Atlético Club two years later. After the latter's relegation from the Primera División at the end of the 2006–07 season he joined Argentinos Juniors, finishing as the team's top goalscorer in the 2007 Apertura.

In the middle of 2008, Pereira signed with Romania's CFR Cluj for a €2.5 million fee. He started in all the club's matches in its debut campaign in the UEFA Champions League.

=== Porto ===
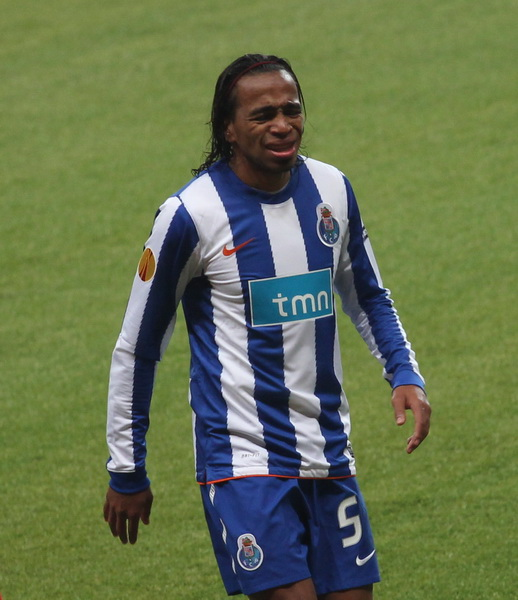
Pereira in action for Porto in 2010

Pereira joined FC Porto on 4 June 2009 for a reported €4.5 million, with the Portuguese acquiring 80% of the player's rights. In his first year he mostly operated as a left-back, as the northerners finished third and won the Taça de Portugal. He scored his first goal for the club on 21 February 2010, netting the second in a 5–1 home win over S.C. Braga.

In Pereira's second season at the Estádio do Dragão, he featured in 21 Primeira Liga games (all starts), adding 12 UEFA Europa League appearances as Porto won the treble. He also started in that campaign's Portuguese Cup final against Vitória de Guimarães on 22 May 2011, scoring an own goal in the 21st minute to bring the sides level in an eventual 6–2 victory.

After Porto rejected an offer from Premier League side Chelsea in the summer for Pereira, he signed a new contract on 3 October 2011 running until 2016, with his release clause remaining at £25.7 million. In late December, he heavily criticised Manchester United's Patrice Evra for reporting alleged racist abuse from Pereira's national team colleague Luis Suárez – including a claim from Evra that Suárez "doesn't speak to black players" – saying that "what happens on the pitch stays on the pitch", adding that the Frenchman would have to "wear body armour" if the players' future international friendly was to take place immediately instead of in late 2012.

=== Inter Milan ===
Pereira signed for Inter Milan in late August 2012 for €10 million on a four-year contract, reuniting with former Porto teammate Fredy Guarín. He made his Serie A debut on 2 September in a 1–3 home loss against A.S. Roma, and finished his first season with 40 appearances in all competitions, scoring his only goal in a 2–0 league victory at A.C. ChievoVerona.

On 17 January 2014, São Paulo FC signed Pereira on loan for one and a half years, with an option to make the move permanent. He played his first match with his new club nine days later, a 2–1 win against Oeste Futebol Clube for that year's Campeonato Paulista, assisting Antônio Carlos in the second goal; after the match, he stated he "...liked the team's intensity", further adding he still needed to "...improve a lot."

=== Estudiantes ===
In January 2015, Pereira returned to Argentina to join Estudiantes de La Plata in a temporary deal, with an obligation to sign for €2.752 million. He appeared in 36 matches across all competitions in his first year, scoring three goals – including one in a 1–1 draw with San Martín de San Juan in the Copa Argentina that ended in a penalty shoot-out victory. However, in his last appearance, an exhibition game against neighbouring Club de Gimnasia y Esgrima La Plata which eventually turned into a massive brawl, he assaulted opponent Facundo Oreja with a kick to the face which saw him sent off; he was eventually handed an eight-match ban, which he served at his following club Getafe CF, where he arrived in February 2016 on loan until June.

Pereira played his first match for the Spaniards on 1 March 2016, being ejected after two bookable offences midway through the second half of a 4–0 defeat at UD Las Palmas.

=== Later career ===
On 3 July 2016, Pereira signed a one-year loan contract with Cerro Porteño of the Paraguayan Primera División. During his spell in Barrio Obrero, he dealt with several injury problems.

Pereira returned to his country's and its Primera División in late January 2019, with the 33-year-old joining Club Nacional de Football still on loan from Estudiantes. On his debut on 4 February, he was sent off for a second yellow card at the end of extra time as the club won the Supercopa Uruguaya on penalties against rivals Peñarol.

Having played only eight competitive games during his tenure, Pereira became a free agent and returned to Paraguay, signing for Club River Plate (Asunción) in January 2020. On 7 October that year he came back to Europe, by joining ŠKF Sereď in the Slovak Super Liga. He only totalled seven minutes against FC ViOn Zlaté Moravce before contracting COVID-19, and left shortly after.

== International career ==
Pereira made his debut for Uruguay against France, on 19 November 2008. He scored his first international goal in his next match, another friendly, with Libya in Tripoli (3–2 win).

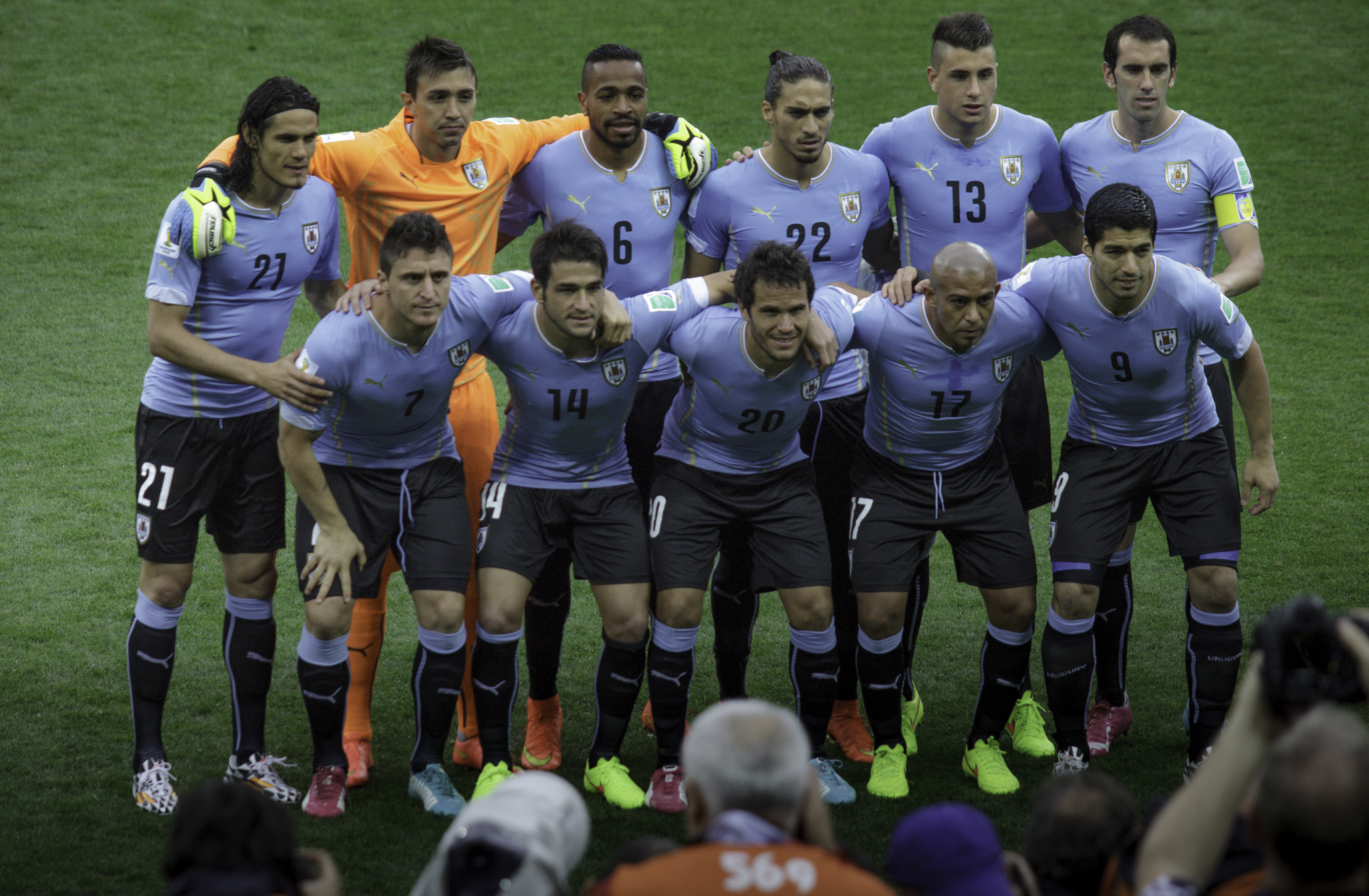
Pereira (wearing number 6) lining up for Uruguay during the 2014 World Cup.

Pereira was an undisputed starter for the nation during the second half of the 2010 FIFA World Cup qualifiers, also starting in both legs of the successful playoffs against Costa Rica as the Charrúas returned to the FIFA World Cup. In the finals in South Africa he played all the matches except two, scoring through a rare header in a 3–0 group stage victory over the hosts.

Pereira was selected to the 2011 Copa América in Argentina, being first-choice and scoring two goals in the group stage, including the game's only against Mexico as Uruguay won its 15th continental tournament. In 2013, he represented La Celeste at the 2013 FIFA Confederations Cup as the nation reached the semi-finals, and also participated in the team's successful World Cup qualifying campaign.

On 2 June 2014, Pereira was named in Uruguay's squad for the 2014 World Cup finals. On 19 June, in the second group game against England, he was struck unconscious after being kneed in the head by Raheem Sterling, but refused to be replaced after recovering and went on to feature the full 90 minutes in the 2–1 win.

At the 2015 Copa América in Chile, Pereira was suspended for the quarter-final against the hosts, and his team lost by a single goal. The following year, at the next edition in the United States, he only played the first group game, in which he scored an own goal in a 3–1 loss to Mexico.

== Career statistics ==
=== Club ===
As of 12 March 2017

Club	Season	League		Cup		League Cup		Continental		Other (Note: Includes the Campeonato Paulista and Supertaça Cândido de Oliveira)		Total	
Club	Season	Apps	Goals	Apps	Goals	Apps	Goals	Apps	Goals	Apps	Goals	Apps	Goals
Miramar	2004	12	0	—		—		—		—		12	0
Miramar	2005	16	1	—		—		—		—		16	1
Miramar	Total	28	1	—		—		—		—		28	1
Quilmes	2005–06	5	0	—		—		—		—		5	0
Quilmes	2006–07	28	0	—		—		—		—		28	0
Quilmes	Total	33	0	—		—		—		—		33	0
Argentinos Juniors	2007–08	35	11	—		—		—		—		35	11
CFR Cluj	2008–09	29	1	2	1	—		6	0	—		37	2
Porto	2009–10	28	1	5	0	4	0	8	0	1	0	46	1
Porto	2010–11	21	0	3	1	0	0	14	0	1	0	39	1
Porto	2011–12	23	1	1	0	3	0	7	0	—		34	1
Porto	Total	72	2	9	1	7	0	29	0	2	0	119	3
Inter Milan	2012–13	28	1	3	0	—		9	0	—		40	1
Inter Milan	2013–14	5	0	2	0	—		—		—		7	0
Inter Milan	Total	33	1	5	0	—		9	0	—		47	1
São Paulo (loan)	2014	21	0	6	0	—		7	0	11	1	45	1
Estudiantes	2015	24	2	2	1	—		10	0	—		36	3
Getafe (loan)	2015–16	6	0	—		—		—		—		6	0
Cerro Porteño	2016	15	1	—		—		10	2	—		25	3
Cerro Porteño	2017	5	0	—		—		1	0	—		6	0
Cerro Porteño	2018	0	0	—		—		0	0	—		0	0
Cerro Porteño	Total	20	1	—		—		11	2	—		31	3
Career Total		301	19	24	3	7	0	72	2	13	1	417	25

=== International ===
National team	Year	Apps	Goals
Uruguay	2008	1	0
Uruguay	2009	12	1
Uruguay	2010	11	2
Uruguay	2011	13	2
Uruguay	2012	8	0
Uruguay	2013	9	0
Uruguay	2014	11	1
Uruguay	2015	11	2
Uruguay	2016	7	0
Total		83	7

#	Date	Venue	Opponent	Score	Result	Competition
1.	11 February 2009	June 11, Tripoli, Libya	Libya	2–3	2–3	Friendly
2.	27 May 2010	Centenario, Montevideo, Uruguay	Israel	2–1	4–1	Friendly
3.	16 June 2010	Loftus Versfeld, Pretoria, South Africa	South Africa	0–3	0–3	2010 FIFA World Cup
4.	9 July 2011	Malvinas Argentinas, Mendoza, Argentina	Chile	1–0	1–1	2011 Copa América
5.	12 July 2011	Ciudad de La Plata, La Plata, Argentina	Mexico	1–0	1–0	2011 Copa América
6.	5 March 2014	Wörthersee, Klagenfurt, Austria	Austria	1–1	1–1	Friendly
7.	17 November 2015	Centenario, Montevideo, Uruguay	Chile	2–0	3–0	2018 World Cup qualification

== Honours ==
CFR Cluj

- Cupa României: 2008–09

Porto

- Primeira Liga: 2010–11, 2011–12
- Taça de Portugal: 2009–10, 2010–11
- Supertaça Cândido de Oliveira: 2009, 2010
- UEFA Europa League: 2010–11
- Taça da Liga runner-up: 2009–10

Cerro Porteño

- Paraguayan Primera División: 2017 Clausura

Nacional

- Supercopa Uruguaya: 2019

Uruguay

- Copa América: 2011
