= Leonardo Ramos (footballer, born 1969) =

Uruguayan footballer

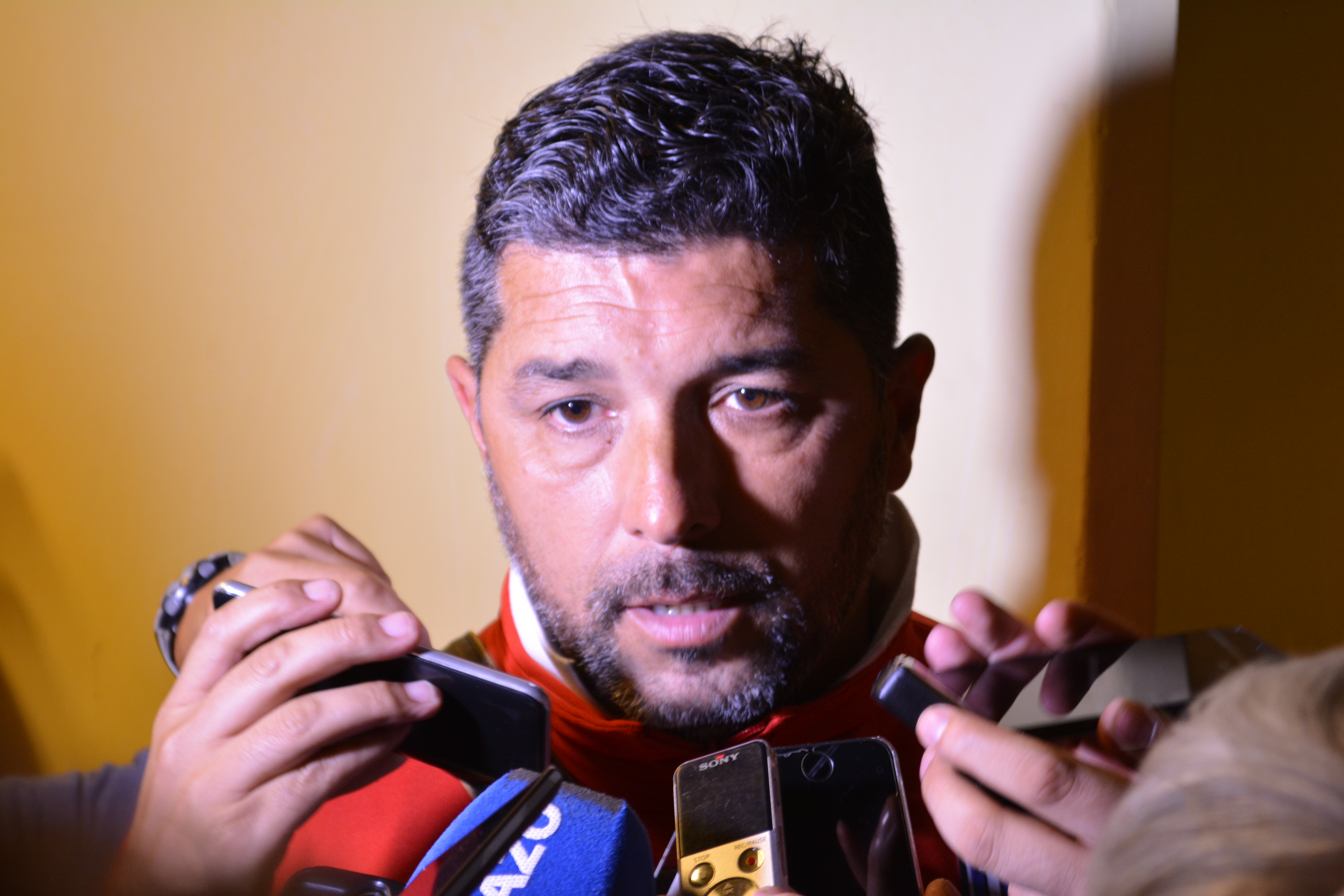
- Ramos in 2016

Personal information
- Full name: Leonardo Alfredo Ramos Girón
- Date of birth: 11 September 1969 (age 57)
- Place of birth: Montevideo, Uruguay
- Height: 1.83 m (6 ft 0 in)
- Position: Midfielder

Senior career*
Years	Team	Apps	(Gls)
1988–1992	Progreso		
1992–1993	Vélez Sársfield	6	(0)
1993–1994	Banfield	22	(2)
1994–1998	Estudiantes LP	133	(17)
1998–1999	Salamanca	16	(2)
1999–2000	River Plate	36	(2)
2000–2001	Chacarita Juniors	26	(1)
2001–2002	Estudiantes LP	11	(0)
2002	Salamanca	8	(0)
2003	Colo-Colo	9	(0)
2003	Nueva Chicago	17	(2)
2004	Peñarol	7	(0)
2004	Aldosivi	11	(3)
2005	Chacarita Juniors	18	(6)
2005–2006	Defensa y Justicia	18	(1)
2006–2007	Independiente Rivadavia	26	(2)
2007	Luján de Cuyo	8	(1)

International career
1991–2000	Uruguay	8	(0)

Managerial career
- 2007–2008: Guillermo Brown
- 2009: Estudiantes BA
- 2010: Nueva Chicago
- 2010: Atlético Colegiales
- 2011–2012: Progreso
- 2012–2015: Danubio
- 2016: Unión La Calera
- 2016: Danubio
- 2017–2018: Peñarol
- 2018: Al-Ettifaq
- 2019: Barcelona SC
- 2020–2021: Danubio
- 2021–2022: Querétaro
- 2022: Peñarol
- 2023: Montevideo City Torque
- 2024: Al-Tai
- 2025–2026: Al-Bukiryah
- 2026: Universidad de Concepción
- 2026: Danubio
- * Club domestic league appearances and goals

Leonardo Alfredo Ramos Girón (born 11 September 1969) is a Uruguayan football manager and former player who played as a midfielder.

== Club career ==
Ramos played for Vélez Sársfield, Banfield, Estudiantes de La Plata, River Plate and Chacarita Juniors in the Primera División de Argentina. He had two spells with Salamanca in the Spanish Segunda División. He also had a brief spell in Chile for Colo-Colo.

== International career ==
Ramos made eight appearances for the senior Uruguay national football team from 1991 to 2000, including five FIFA World Cup qualifying matches.

== Coaching career ==
In May 2018, it was announced that Ramos would leave Peñarol and join Al-Ettifaq.

On 15 April 2024, Ramos was appointed as manager of Saudi Pro League side Al-Tai until the end of the 2023–24 season.

On 31 January 2025, Ramos was appointed as manager of Saudi First Division club Al-Bukiryah. He was sacked on 23 February 2026.

In March 2026, Ramos assumed as manager of Chilean club Universidad de Concepción. He resigned in May of the same year.

== Managerial statistics ==
As of 4 November 2025

Managerial record by team and tenure
Team	Nat	From	To	Record							
Team	Nat	From	To	G	W	D	L	GF	GA	GD	Win %
Progreso	(Uruguay)	1 November 2011	20 December 2012	45	20	10	15	61	63	−2	44.44
Danubio	(Uruguay)	27 December 2012	30 June 2015	86	41	17	28	113	102	+11	47.67
Unión La Calera	(Chile)	19 February 2016	30 April 2016	10	1	4	5	13	20	−7	10.00
Danubio	(Uruguay)	3 May 2016	31 December 2016	20	11	4	5	31	24	+7	55.00
Peñarol	(Uruguay)	1 January 2017	30 June 2018	72	48	11	13	160	69	+91	66.67
Al-Ettifaq	(Saudi Arabia)	1 July 2018	27 November 2018	10	4	2	4	19	20	−1	40.00
Barcelona SC	(Ecuador)	19 April 2019	1 November 2019	27	14	4	9	41	32	+9	51.85
Danubio	(Uruguay)	23 August 2020	23 August 2021	41	13	13	15	38	47	−9	31.71
Querétaro	(Mexico)	25 August 2021	8 February 2022	15	3	5	7	12	18	−6	20.00
Peñarol	(Uruguay)	2 August 2022	8 November 2022	19	10	4	5	30	23	+7	52.63
Montevideo City Torque	(Uruguay)	14 September 2023	31 December 2023	13	6	2	5	20	18	+2	46.15
Al-Tai	(Saudi Arabia)	15 April 2024	30 June 2024	7	2	2	3	7	9	−2	28.57
Al-Bukiryah	(Saudi Arabia)	4 February 2025	23 February 2026	40	20	8	12	55	43	+12	50.00
Career totals				405	193	86	126	600	488	+112	47.65

== Honours ==
=== Player ===
Progresso

- Uruguayan Primera División: 1989

Vélez Sársfield

- Argentine Primera División: 1993 (Clausura)

Estudiantes

- Primera B Nacional: 1994–95

River Plate

- Argentine Primera División: 1999 (Apertura), 2000 (Clausura)

Independiente Rivadavia

- Torneo Argentino A: 2006–07

=== Manager ===
Danubio

- Uruguayan Primera División: 2013–14

Peñarol

- Uruguayan Primera División: 2017
- Supercopa Uruguaya: 2018
