= Bruno Veglio =

Uruguayan football player (born 1998)

Personal information
- Full name: Bruno Enrico Veglio Araújo
- Date of birth: 12 February 1998 (age 28)
- Place of birth: Montevideo, Uruguay
- Height: 1.66 m (5 ft 5 in)
- Position: Midfielder

Team information
- Current team: Curicó Unido

Youth career
- Colegio Pallotti
- 2011–2018: Montevideo Wanderers

Senior career*
Years	Team	Apps	(Gls)
2018–2025	Montevideo Wanderers	171	(10)
2026–	Curicó Unido	0	(0)
- * Club domestic league appearances and goals as of 16 September 2024

Bruno Enrico Veglio Araújo (born 12 February 1998) is a Uruguayan professional footballer who plays as a midfielder for Chilean club Curicó Unido.

== Career ==
Veglio signed his first professional contract in July 2018 with Montevideo Wanderers, effectively ending his seven-year youth career with the club. He made his professional debut for the club on 26 February 2019, coming on as an 82nd-minute substitute for Francisco Ginella in a 4–1 victory over Nacional. After breaking into the first team as a frequent starter the following season, Veglio suffered a season-ending knee injury in November 2020. He would make his return to first team football at the season-opening 2021 Supercopa Uruguaya.

In May 2026, Veglio moved to Chile and signed with Curicó Unido until the end of the year.

== Career statistics ==
=== Club ===
As of match played 10 May 2021

Appearances and goals by club, season and competition
Club	Season	League			Cup (Note: Includes appearances in the Supercopa Uruguaya)		Continental (Note: Includes appearances in the Copa Sudamericana)		Total	
Club	Season	Division	Apps	Goals	Apps	Goals	Apps	Goals	Apps	Goals
Montevideo Wanderers	2018	Uruguayan Primera División	0	0	—		—		0	0
Montevideo Wanderers	2019	Uruguayan Primera División	20	0	—		4	0	24	0
Montevideo Wanderers	2020	Uruguayan Primera División	15	2	—		—		15	2
Montevideo Wanderers	2021	Uruguayan Primera División	1	0	1	0	—		2	0
Career total			36	2	1	0	4	0	41	2
