= 2019 Supercopa Uruguaya =

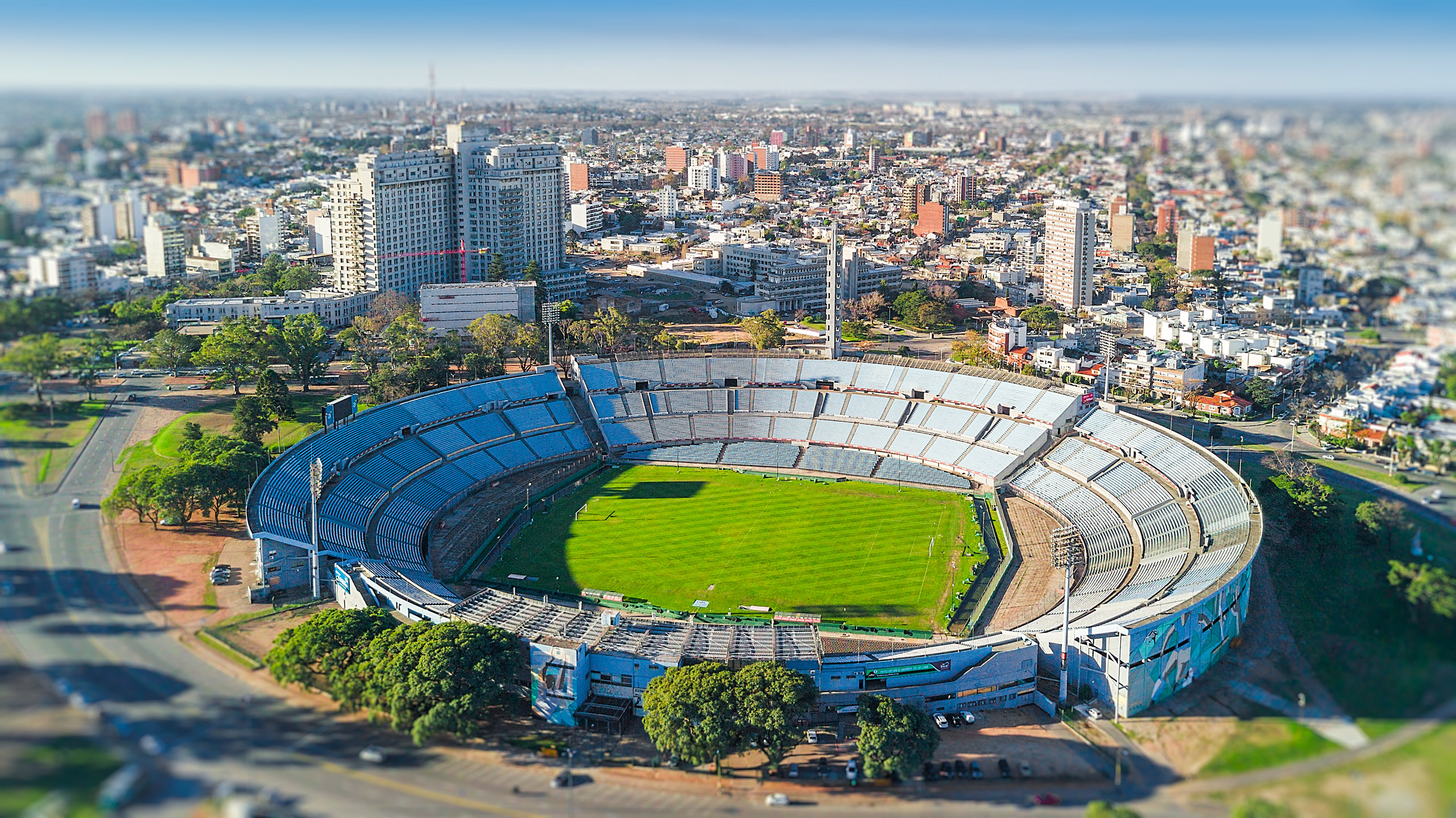
- Estadio Centenario was the venue for the match.
- Event: Supercopa Uruguaya
Nacional	Peñarol
1	1
- Nacional won 4–3 on penalties
- Date: 3 February 2019
- Venue: Estadio Centenario, Montevideo
- Referee: Andrés Cunha

The 2019 Supercopa Uruguaya was the second edition of the Supercopa Uruguaya, Uruguay's football super cup. It was held on 3 February 2019 between 2018 Torneo Intermedio winners Nacional and 2018 Primera División champions Peñarol.

The match was played at Estadio Centenario in Montevideo. Nacional won their first Supercopa title following a 1–1 draw with Peñarol after extra time and a 4–3 win on kicks from the penalty mark.

== Teams ==
Team	Qualification
Nacional	2018 Intermedio winners
Peñarol	2018 Primera División champions

== Match details ==
3 February 2019
20:15 UTC−3

Nacional	1–1 (a.e.t.)	Peñarol
Angeleri 36'	Report	C. Rodríguez 62' (pen.)
Penalties
Bergessio (penalty missed); Carballo (penalty scored); Viña (penalty scored); Arzura (penalty scored); Conde (penalty missed); Zunino (penalty scored)	4–3	(penalty scored) C. Rodríguez; (penalty scored) Viatri; (penalty missed) G. Rodríguez; (penalty scored) Canobbio; (penalty missed) Fernández; (penalty missed) Hernández

Estadio Centenario, Montevideo
Referee: Andrés Cunha

Nacional	Peñarol

GK	1	(Uruguay) Esteban Conde	(yellow card) 70'
CB	4	(Uruguay) Guillermo Cotugno	(yellow card) 49'
CB	2	(Argentina) Marcos Angeleri
CB	17	(Uruguay) Matías Viña
RWB	13	(Uruguay) Matías Zunino
LWB	3	(Uruguay) Álvaro Pereira	(yellow card) 75' (yellow-red card) 120+1'
CM	20	(Uruguay) Felipe Carballo	(yellow card) 64'
CM	15	(Argentina) Joaquín Arzura
CM	11	(Uruguay) Gonzalo Castro	(yellow card) 52'	(substituted off) 70'
AM	23	(Uruguay) Santiago Rodríguez	(red card) 88'
CF	18	(Uruguay) Sebastián Fernández	(substituted off) 90'
Substitutes:
GK	12	(Panama) Luis Mejía
DF	5	(Uruguay) Rafael García
MF	8	(Uruguay) Gabriel Neves	(substituted on) 90'
MF	10	(Uruguay) Rodrigo Amaral
MF	32	(Uruguay) Mathías Cardacio
MF	7	(Uruguay) Kevin Ramírez	(substituted on) 70'	(substituted off) 74'
FW	9	(Argentina) Gonzalo Bergessio	(substituted on) 74'
Manager:
(Argentina) Eduardo Domínguez

GK	12	(Uruguay) Kevin Dawson
RB	20	(Uruguay) Giovanni González
CB	2	(Uruguay) Fabricio Formiliano
CB	3	(Uruguay) Enzo Martínez	(yellow card) 41'
LB	27	(Uruguay) Lucas Hernández
RM	11	(Uruguay) Fabián Estoyanoff	(substituted off) 57'
CM	14	(Uruguay) Guzmán Pereira	(substituted off) 94'
CM	23	(Uruguay) Walter Gargano	(substituted off) 113'
LM	19	(Uruguay) Agustín Canobbio
CF	26	(Uruguay) Gabriel Fernández
CF	7	(Uruguay) Cristian Rodríguez	(yellow card) 90'
Substitutes:
GK	1	(Uruguay) Thiago Cardozo
DF	24	(Uruguay) Jesús Trindade
DF	30	(Uruguay) Yeferson Quintana
MF	5	(Uruguay) Marcel Novick	(substituted on) 113'
MF	15	(Uruguay) Brian Rodríguez
FW	9	(Uruguay) Gastón Rodríguez	(substituted on) 57'	(yellow card) 70'
FW	28	(Argentina) Lucas Viatri	(substituted on) 94'
Manager:
(Uruguay) Diego López
