= Martín Lasarte =

Uruguayan football manager (born 1961)

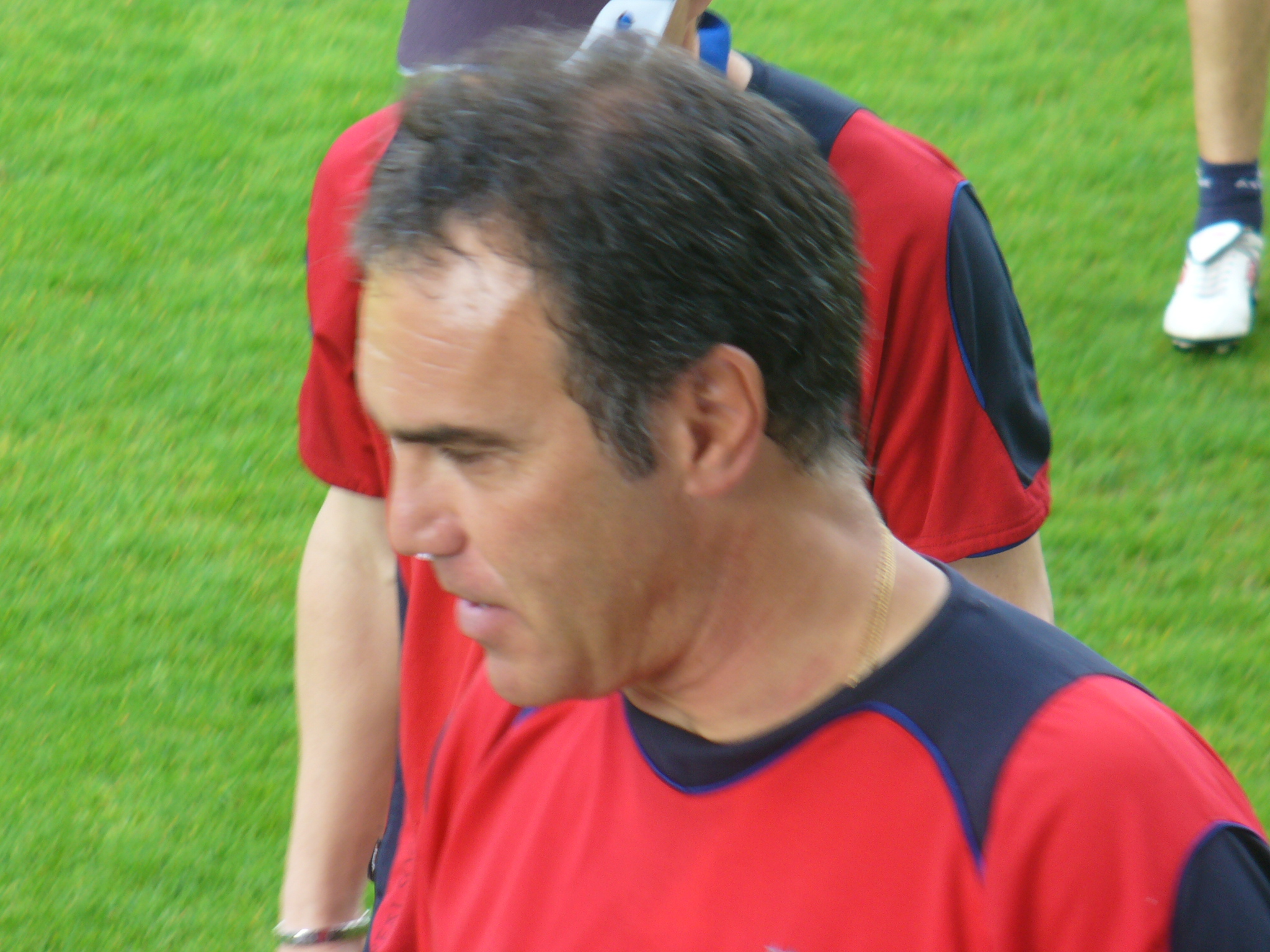
- Lasarte as a manager of Real Sociedad in 2010

Personal information
- Full name: Martín Bernardo Lasarte Arróspide
- Date of birth: 20 March 1961 (age 65)
- Place of birth: Montevideo, Uruguay
- Height: 1.82 m (6 ft 0 in)
- Position: Defender

Senior career*
Years	Team	Apps	(Gls)
1980–1985	Rentistas		
1986	Central Español		
1987	Rampla Juniors		
1988	Nacional Montevideo		
1989–1992	Deportivo La Coruña	122	(1)
1993–1994	Defensor		
1995	Rentistas		
1996	Rampla Juniors		

Managerial career
- 1996–1997: Rampla Juniors
- 1998–1999: Rentistas
- 2000–2001: Bella Vista
- 2002: Al Wasl
- 2003–2004: River Plate Montevideo
- 2005–2006: Nacional Montevideo
- 2007: Millonarios
- 2008–2009: Danubio
- 2009–2011: Real Sociedad
- 2012–2013: Universidad Católica
- 2014–2015: Universidad de Chile
- 2016–2017: Nacional Montevideo
- 2018–2019: Al Ahly
- 2021–2022: Chile
- 2024–2025: Nacional Montevideo
- * Club domestic league appearances and goals

Martín Bernardo Lasarte Arróspide (born 20 March 1961) is a Uruguayan former footballer who played as a defender, and recently the manager of Nacional Montevideo.

He represented five teams in his country, and also had a three-and-a-half-year spell in Spain with Deportivo during a 16-year senior career.

Lasarte began working as a coach in 1996, and managed several clubs over the next decades including Nacional where he also had played.

== Playing career ==
Lasarte was born in Montevideo to a Spanish father and an Uruguayan mother, with the former having immigrated from the Basque Country. In his country, he represented C.A. Rentistas (two spells), Central Español, Rampla Juniors (twice), Club Nacional de Football and Defensor Sporting, winning four major titles with the fourth club including the 1988 edition of the Copa Libertadores followed by the Intercontinental Cup.

Abroad, Lasarte played four seasons for Deportivo de La Coruña in Spain. In 1990–91 he helped the Galicians return to La Liga, appearing in 35 complete matches the following campaign as the side finally avoided relegation. He also acted as captain in several games.

== Coaching career ==
Lasarte's career as manager began at the age of 35 with Rampla Juniors, which he led to the second position in the Primera División in the 1996 Clausura. In the following years he was in charge of several clubs, including Al Wasl F.C. from the United Arab Emirates in 2002, which he joined with the side in last place, eventually leading them to fifth.

In 2003, Lasarte was appointed at Club Atlético River Plate (Montevideo), helping to promotion from the Segunda División in his second season. He led his following team, Nacional de Uruguay, to two consecutive national championships. After finishing fifth in the 2006–07 Apertura he did not have his contract renewed and left, going on to have a very brief spell in Colombia.

After one season with Danubio F.C. in his country, Lasarte returned to the land of his father and signed for Real Sociedad in the Segunda División. In his first season they returned to the top flight after an absence of three years and, in late August 2010, he extended his contract until June 2012.

In 2010–11, Real were close to the qualifying positions to the UEFA Europa League late into the first half of the campaign, but eventually had to wait until the last matchday to be safe from relegation, which eventually happened. On 24 May 2011, however, he was relieved of his duties.

On 15 May 2014, Lasarte was named manager of Club Universidad de Chile. In June 2016, in the same capacity, he returned to Nacional.

Lasarte was appointed at Egyptian Premier League's Al Ahly SC in December 2018. He led the club to its 41st national championship in his first season but, on 18 August 2019, was dismissed after being ousted from the Egypt Cup by Pyramids FC.

On 10 February 2021, the Football Federation of Chile announced Lasarte as their national team's new coach. On April 1, 2022, Martin Lasarte decided not to continue with the Chile national team.

== Managerial statistics ==
As of match played 30 March 2025

Managerial record by team and tenure
Team	Nat	From	To	Record				
Team	Nat	From	To	P	W	D	L	Win %
Rampla Juniors	(Uruguay)	1 July 1996	31 December 1997	44	13	16	15	29.55
Rentistas	(Uruguay)	1 January 1998	31 December 1999	43	13	15	15	30.23
Bella Vista	(Uruguay)	18 October 2000	21 August 2001	48	16	11	21	33.33
Al Wasl	(United Arab Emirates)	1 November 2002	1 April 2003	10	3	4	3	30.00
River Plate	(Uruguay)	20 May 2003	31 December 2004	50	34	7	9	68.00
Nacional	(Uruguay)	1 May 2005	31 December 2006	94	52	24	18	55.32
Millonarios	(Colombia)	11 July 2007	3 September 2007	9	2	1	6	22.22
Danubio	(Uruguay)	22 April 2008	11 May 2009	50	19	9	22	38.00
Real Sociedad	(Spain)	1 July 2009	24 May 2011	83	34	17	32	40.96
Universidad Católica	(Chile)	4 June 2012	17 December 2013	93	50	21	22	53.76
Universidad de Chile	(Chile)	1 June 2014	31 December 2015	74	39	13	22	52.70
Nacional	(Uruguay)	13 June 2016	31 December 2017	61	40	8	13	65.57
Al-Ahly	(Egypt)	1 January 2018	18 August 2019	40	27	4	9	67.50
Chile	(Chile)	14 February 2021	1 April 2022	22	7	6	9	31.82
Nacional	(Uruguay)	17 June 2024	30 March 2025	38	23	11	4	60.53
Total				758	371	167	220	48.94

== Honours ==
=== Player ===
Nacional

- Copa Libertadores: 1988
- Intercontinental Cup: 1988

=== Manager ===
River Plate Montevideo

- Uruguayan Segunda División: 2004

Nacional

- Uruguayan Primera División: 2005, 2005–06, 2016, 2017-I, 2024-I
- Supercopa Uruguaya: 2025

Real Sociedad

- Segunda División: 2009–10

Universidad de Chile

- Chilean Primera División: 2014 Apertura
- Copa Chile: 2015
- Supercopa de Chile: 2015

Al Ahly

- Egyptian Premier League: 2018–19
