= Sebastián Fernández (footballer, born 1985) =

Uruguayan footballer (born 1985)

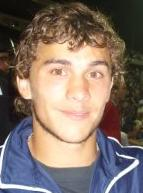

Personal information
- Full name: Sebastián Bruno Fernández Miglierina
- Date of birth: 23 May 1985 (age 41)
- Place of birth: Montevideo, Uruguay
- Height: 1.67 m (5 ft 6 in)
- Position: Forward

Team information
- Current team: Danubio
- Number: 30

Senior career*
Years	Team	Apps	(Gls)
2004–2006	Miramar Misiones	75	(22)
2007–2008	Defensor Sporting	32	(15)
2008–2010	Banfield	70	(15)
2010–2013	Málaga	97	(15)
2013–2014	Rayo Vallecano	9	(1)
2014–2020	Nacional	207	(48)
2021	Liverpool Montevideo	30	(8)
2022–	Danubio	172	(45)

International career
2006–2012	Uruguay	14	(2)
- * Club domestic league appearances and goals as of 21:25, 22 September 2026 (KST)

Sebastián Bruno Fernández Miglierina (born 23 May 1985) is a Uruguayan professional footballer who plays as a forward for Danubio.

== Club career ==
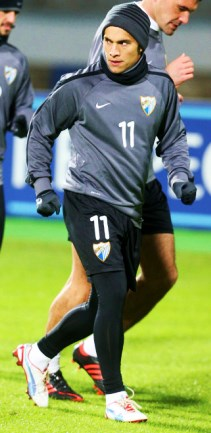
Fernández with Málaga in 2012

Born in Montevideo, Fernández started his professional playing career in 2004 with Miramar Misiones. In 2007, he joined Defensor Sporting Club, where he was part of the team that won the Apertura 2007 championship and the Copa Uruguaya 2008.

In 2008, he joined Argentine Club Atlético Banfield, where he was a key member of the squad that won the Apertura 2009 championship, appearing in 16 of their 19 games. On 13 December 2009 he celebrated with his teammates when Banfield won the Argentine championship for the first time in the history of the club.

On 17 February 2010, Fernandez helped his teammates thrash Deportivo Cuenca in Copa Libertadores, scoring two goals either side of half-time to enrich his team's 4–1 victory in Ecuador.

In July 2010 he had a medical with La Liga side Málaga CF. On 5 August 2010 he signed a contract with Málaga for four years and his transfer cost the Spanish side €3.6 million. He already started to pay off some of his fee as he scored a goal on his debut in a home match against Valencia CF on 28 August 2010. He finished the season with 7 league goals, being the club's second highest goalscorer.

In 2011–12, after the summer signing of Ruud van Nistelrooy, Seba was demoted to third choice striker, often coming on as a substitute. On 21 November he started as a right winger against Racing and scored his first goal of the season, in a 3–1 away win. Exactly one year later he scored his first Champions League group stage goal in a 2–2 away draw against FC Zenit Saint Petersburg.

Fernandez signed for Rayo Vallecano in the summer of 2013 but suffered an injury early in the season, ruling him out of the majority of the campaign. His 86th-minute header in Rayo's 3–0 win against Granada on 26 April 2014 was his first goal in more than two years.

On 1 August 2014 Fernández returned to his home country, joining Nacional. Fernández played for Nacional until the end of 2020. In April 2021, he moved to Liverpool Montevideo. On 5 January 2022, Fernández signed a one-year deal with Danubio.

== International career ==
Fernández made his international debut for the Uruguay national team as a late substitute in a friendly game against Romania on 24 May 2006. In May 2010 he has been called up for 2010 World Cup.

On 27 July 2010, he was reserved to play a friendly match against Angola in Lisbon.

Fernández scored his first goal for Uruguay in a friendly match against China.

== Career statistics ==
=== International ===
Appearances and goals by national team and year
National team	Year	Apps	Goals
Uruguay	2006	1	0
Uruguay	2007	0	0
Uruguay	2008	2	0
Uruguay	2009	2	0
Uruguay	2010	6	1
Uruguay	2011	2	1
Uruguay	2012	1	0
Total		14	2

Scores and results list Uruguay's goal tally first, score column indicates score after each Fernández goal.

List of international goals scored by Sebastián Fernández
No.	Date	Venue	Opponent	Score	Result	Competition
1	12 October 2010	Wuhan Sports Center Stadium, Wuhan, China	China	4–0	4–0	Friendly
2	15 November 2011	Stadio Olimpico, Rome, Italy	Italy	1–0	1–0	Friendly

== Honours ==
Defensor Sporting

- Uruguayan Primera División: 2007 Apertura

Banfield

- Argentine Primera División: 2009 Apertura

Nacional

- Uruguayan Primera División: 2014–15, 2016, 2019, 2020
- Supercopa Uruguaya: 2019
- Torneo Intermedio: 2017, 2018, 2020
