= Kevin Dawson (footballer, born 1992) =

Uruguayan footballer (born 1992)

Personal information
- Full name: Kevin Emiliano Dawson Blanco
- Date of birth: 8 February 1992 (age 34)
- Place of birth: Colonia del Sacramento, Uruguay
- Height: 1.78 m (5 ft 10 in)
- Position: Goalkeeper

Team information
- Current team: Defensor Sporting
- Number: 12

Youth career
- Plaza Colonia
- Nacional

Senior career*
Years	Team	Apps	(Gls)
2011–2017	Plaza Colonia	122	(0)
2017	→ Peñarol (loan)	16	(0)
2018–2022	Peñarol	157	(0)
2023	Deportivo Cali	19	(0)
2023	Plaza Colonia	14	(0)
2024–	Defensor Sporting	67	(0)

International career
2009	Uruguay U17	1	(0)
- * Club domestic league appearances and goals as of 1 October 2025

Kevin Emiliano Dawson Blanco (born 8 February 1992) is a Uruguayan professional footballer who plays as goalkeeper for Defensor Sporting.

== Career statistics ==
As of 30 November 2024

Appearances and goals by club, season and competition
Club	Season	League			Cup		Continental		Other		Total	
Club	Season	Division	Apps	Goals	Apps	Goals	Apps	Goals	Apps	Goals	Apps	Goals
Plaza Colonia	2011–12	Uruguayan Segunda División	13	0	—		—		2 (Note: Appearances in Segunda División play-offs.)	0	15	0
Plaza Colonia	2012–13	Uruguayan Segunda División	26	0	—		—		2	0	28	0
Plaza Colonia	2013–14	Uruguayan Segunda División	26	0	—		—		4	0	30	0
Plaza Colonia	2014–15	Uruguayan Segunda División	14	0	—		—		—		14	0
Plaza Colonia	2015–16	Uruguayan Primera División	28	0	—		—		1 (Note: Appearance in Championship play-offs.)	0	29	0
Plaza Colonia	2016	Uruguayan Primera División	15	0	—		2	0	—		17	0
Plaza Colonia	Total		122	0	—		2	0	9	0	133	0
Peñarol (loan)	2017	Uruguayan Primera División	16	0	—		0	0	2	0	18	0
Peñarol	2018	Uruguayan Primera División	32	0	—		8 (Note: Six appearances in Copa Libertadores and two appearances in Copa Sudamericana.)	0	2 (Note: One appearance each in Supercopa Uruguaya and Championship play-off.)	0	42	0
Peñarol	2019	Uruguayan Primera División	33	0	—		9 (Note: Five appearances in Copa Libertadores and four appearances in Copa Sudamericana.)	0	2	0	44	0
Peñarol	2020	Uruguayan Primera División	34	0	—		8 (Note: Six appearances in Copa Libertadores and two appearances in Copa Sudamericana.)	0	—		42	0
Peñarol	2021	Uruguayan Primera División	26	0	—		14 (Note: Appearances in Copa Sudamericana.)	0	1	0	41	0
Peñarol	2022	Uruguayan Primera División	32	0	—		6 (Note: Appearances in Copa Libertadores.)	0	1 (Note: Appearance in Supercopa Uruguaya.)	0	39	0
Peñarol	Total		173	0	—		45	0	8	0	226	0
Deportivo Cali	2023	Categoría Primera A	19	0	1	0	—		—		20	0
Plaza Colonia	2023	Uruguayan Primera División	14	0	—		—		—		14	0
Defensor Sporting	2024	Uruguayan Primera División	36	0	—		2	0	1 (Note: Appearance in Supercopa Uruguaya .)	0	39	0
Career total			364	0	1	0	49	0	18	0	432	0

== Honours ==
Peñarol

- Uruguayan Primera División: 2017, 2018, 2021
- Supercopa Uruguaya: 2018, 2022

Defensor Sporting

- Copa Uruguay: 2023, 2024

Individual

- Uruguayan Primera División Player of the Year: 2018
- Uruguayan Primera División Team of the Year: 2018
