= 2021 Supercopa Uruguaya =

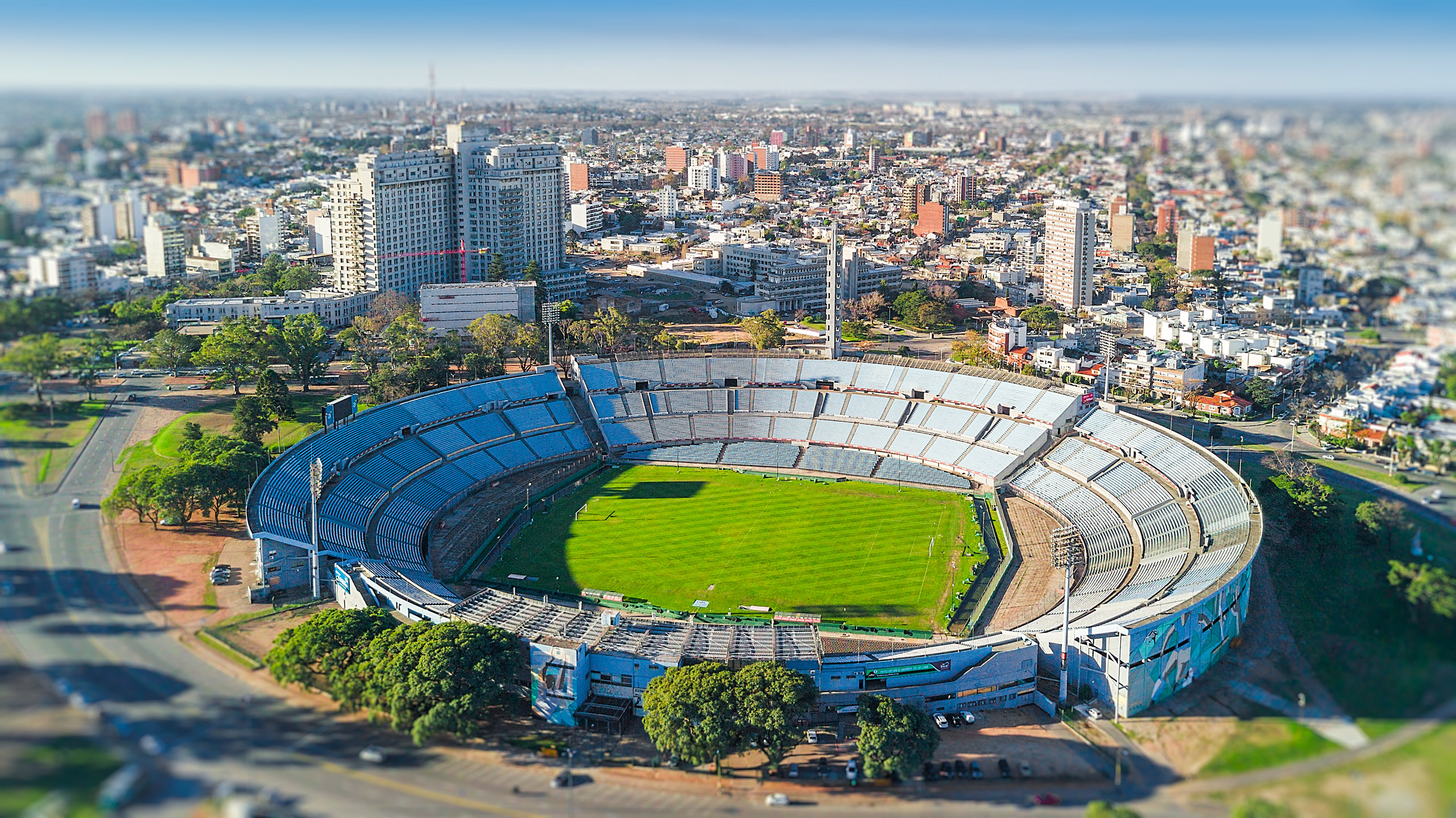
- Estadio Centenario hosted the match.
Nacional	Montevideo Wanderers
2	0
- Date: 2 May 2021
- Venue: Estadio Centenario, Montevideo
- Referee: Leodán González
- Attendance: 0 (Note: Match played behind closed doors due to the COVID-19 pandemic in Uruguay.)

The 2021 Supercopa Uruguaya was the fourth edition of the Supercopa Uruguaya, Uruguay's football super cup. It was held on 2 May 2021 between the 2020 Primera División champions Nacional and the 2020 Torneo Intermedio runners-up Montevideo Wanderers, who qualified for the Supercopa since Nacional also won the Torneo Intermedio in the 2020 season.

Nacional won the match by a 2–0 score to claim their second Supercopa Uruguaya title in four appearances.

== Teams ==
Team	Qualification	Previous appearances (bold indicates winners)
Nacional	2020 Primera División champions	3 (2018, **2019**, 2020)
Montevideo Wanderers	2020 Intermedio runners-up	None

== Details ==
2 May 2021
18:00 UTC−3

Nacional	2–0	Montevideo Wanderers
Fernández 13'; Bergessio 79' (pen.)	Report

Estadio Centenario, Montevideo
Attendance: 0
Referee: Leodán González

**Nacional**	**Montevideo Wanderers**

GK	1	(Uruguay) Sergio Rochet
CB	2	(Uruguay) Mathías Laborda
CB	21	(Uruguay) Guzmán Corujo	(yellow card) 31'
CB	13	(Uruguay) Christian Almeida	(yellow card) 33'
RM	7	(Uruguay) Brian Ocampo
CM	20	(Uruguay) Felipe Carballo	(substituted off) 80'
CM	14	(Uruguay) Joaquín Trasante	(yellow card) 11'	(substituted off) 89'
LM	38	(Uruguay) Camilo Cándido
AM	10	(Argentina) Andrés D'Alessandro	(substituted off) 60'
CF	18	(Argentina) Leandro Fernández	(substituted off) 80'
CF	9	(Argentina) Gonzalo Bergessio	(yellow card) 32'	(substituted off) 89'
Substitutes:
GK	25	(Uruguay) Guillermo Centurión
DF	22	(Uruguay) Ángelo Gabrielli
DF	6	(Uruguay) Nicolás Marichal	(substituted in) 89'
DF	3	(Uruguay) Renzo Orihuela
MF	5	(Uruguay) Rafael García
MF	30	(Uruguay) Maximiliano Cantera	(substituted in) 80'
MF	32	(Uruguay) Emiliano Martínez	(substituted in) 60'	(yellow card) 90+5'
FW	15	(Uruguay) Guillermo May	(substituted in) 89'
FW	19	(Uruguay) Alfonso Trezza	(substituted in) 80'
FW	33	(Uruguay) Gonzalo Vega
Manager:
(Uruguay) Alejandro Cappuccio

GK	12	(Uruguay) Ignacio De Arruabarrena	(yellow card) 38'
CB	19	(Uruguay) Hernán Petryk
CB	8	(Uruguay) Guzmán Pereira	(substituted off) 76'
CB	4	(Uruguay) Darwin Torres
RM	7	(Uruguay) Leonardo Pais
CM	5	(Uruguay) César Araújo	(yellow card) 30'	(substituted off) 64'
CM	16	(Uruguay) Bruno Veglio	(substituted off) 80'
LM	6	(Uruguay) Mathias Abero	(yellow card) 45'
AM	15	(Uruguay) Washington Camacho	(substituted off) 46'
CF	32	(Argentina) Hernán Rivero
CF	9	(Uruguay) Mauro Méndez	(substituted off) 64'
Substitutes:
GK	1	(Uruguay) Mauro Silveira
DF	2	(Colombia) Felipe Aguirre	(substituted in) 76'
DF	3	(Uruguay) Lucas Monzón
DF	21	(Uruguay) Kevin Rolón
MF	6	(Hungary) Krisztián Vadócz	(substituted in) 64'
MF	14	(Uruguay) Diego Riolfo	(substituted in) 80'
MF	24	(Uruguay) Diego Hernández
FW	10	(Uruguay) Rodrigo Rivero	(substituted in) 64'	(yellow card) 74'
FW	11	(Uruguay) Sergio Blanco
FW	25	(Uruguay) Nicolás Quagliata	(substituted in) 46'
FW	29	(Uruguay) Renzo López
Manager:
(Uruguay) Daniel Carreño

Assistant referees:
Carlos Barreiro
Pablo Llarena
Fourth official:
Jonathan Fuentes
Video assistant referee:
Esteban Ostojich
Assistant video assistant referee:
Mathías de Armas

**Match rules**

- 90 minutes
- 30 minutes of extra time if necessary
- Penalty shoot-out if scores still level
- Maximum of five substitutions
