= Diego Aguirre =

Uruguayan footballer (born 1965)

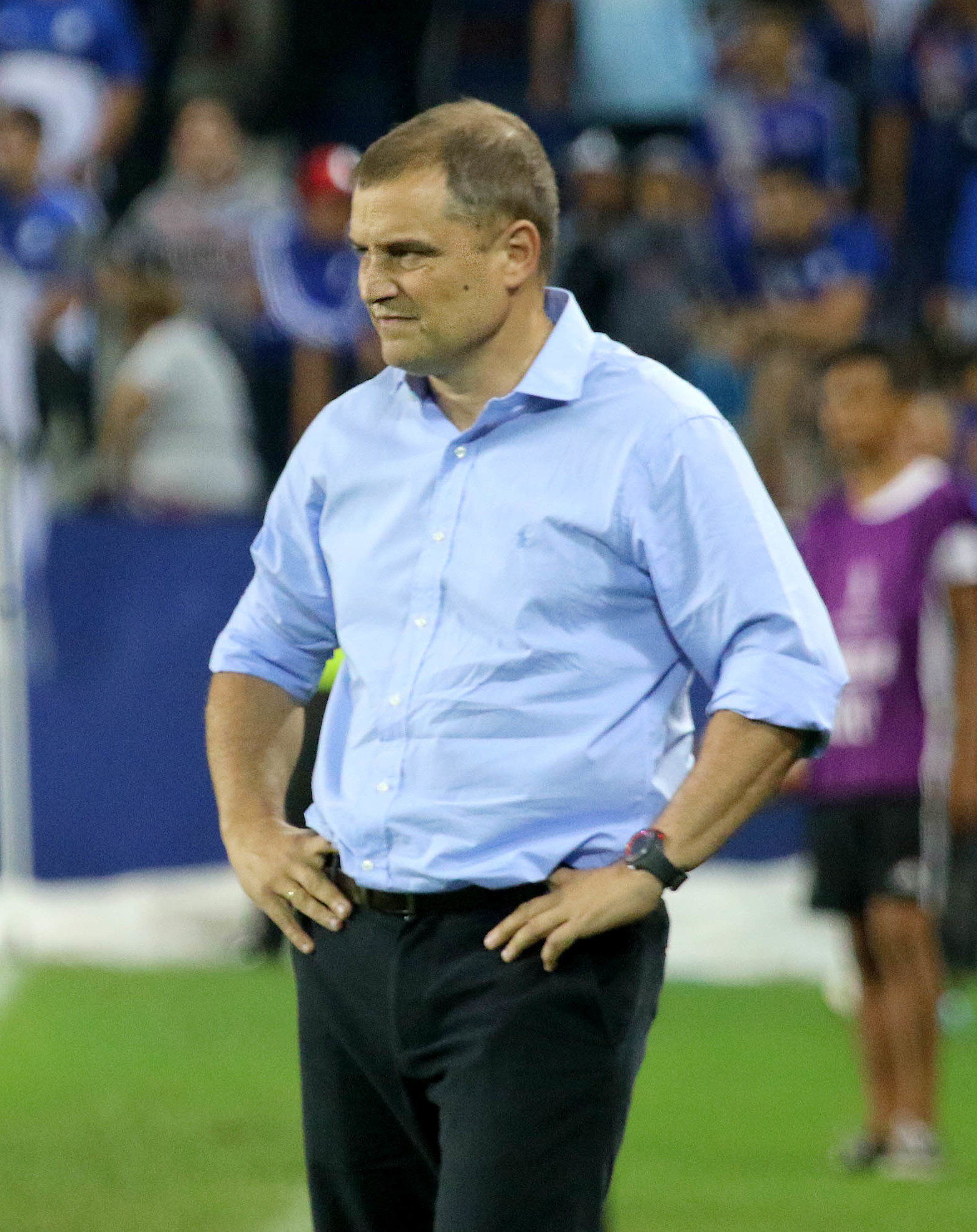
- Aguirre with San Lorenzo in 2017

Personal information
- Full name: Diego Vicente Aguirre Camblor
- Date of birth: 13 September 1965 (age 61)
- Place of birth: Montevideo, Uruguay
- Height: 1.80 m (5 ft 11 in)
- Position: Forward

Team information
- Current team: Peñarol (head coach)

Youth career
- 1982–1983: Liverpool Montevideo

Senior career*
Years	Team	Apps	(Gls)
1983–1985	Liverpool Montevideo	34	(18)
1986–1988	Peñarol	46	(24)
1988	Olympiakos	4	(0)
1988	Fiorentina	4	(1)
1989–1991	Central Español	0	(0)
1989–1990	→ Internacional (loan)	41	(1)
1990	→ São Paulo (loan)	8	(3)
1991	→ Portuguesa (loan)	5	(0)
1992	Independiente	3	(0)
1992	Peñarol	10	(2)
1993	Bolívar	1	
1993–1994	Marbella	20	(6)
1994	Danubio		
1995	Ourense	14	(2)
1996	Deportivo FAS	1	
1997–1998	River Plate Montevideo	1	(1)
1998	Deportes Temuco	4	(0)
1999	Rentistas		

Managerial career
- 2002: Plaza Colonia
- 2003–2004: Peñarol
- 2006: Aucas
- 2007: Montevideo Wanderers
- 2007: Alianza Lima
- 2009–2010: Uruguay U20
- 2010–2011: Peñarol
- 2011–2013: Al-Rayyan
- 2014: Al-Gharafa
- 2015: Internacional
- 2016: Atlético Mineiro
- 2016–2017: San Lorenzo
- 2018: São Paulo
- 2019–2020: Al-Rayyan
- 2021: Internacional
- 2022: Cruz Azul
- 2023: Olimpia
- 2023: Santos
- 2023–: Peñarol
- * Club domestic league appearances and goals

Diego Vicente Aguirre Camblor (born 13 September 1965) is a Uruguayan football manager and former player who played as a forward. He currently manages Peñarol on the Uruguayan Primera División.

== Playing career ==
A Liverpool Montevideo youth graduate, Aguirre joined the club in 1982 at the age of 16, and made his senior debut in the following year. In 1986, he moved to city rivals Peñarol, and was a part of the squad which won the 1987 Copa Libertadores, scoring a last-minute winner in the Final.

In 1988, after an unassuming spell with Olympiacos, Aguirre had a brief stint with Sven-Göran Eriksson's ACF Fiorentina, appearing only in the Coppa Italia. He subsequently moved to Brazil, representing Internacional and São Paulo.

In the following years Aguirre rarely settled into a club, and played for Portuguesa, Independiente, Peñarol, Bolívar, CA Marbella, Danubio, CD Ourense, Deportivo FAS, River Plate Montevideo, Deportes Temuco and Rentistas.

== Managerial career ==
After starting his career with Plaza Colonia in 2002, Aguirre returned to his former club Peñarol in 2003. Despite winning the year's championship, he was sacked in December 2004.

On 20 December 2005, Aguirre was named in charge of Aucas, but was sacked the following March. In 2007, he was appointed manager of Montevideo Wanderers, and was subsequently in charge of Alianza Lima for just five matches.

In 2008, Aguirre was named Uruguay under-20 manager, after a request of Óscar Tabárez. On 7 December 2010 he returned to Peñarol, winning another national championship and reaching the finals of the 2011 Copa Libertadores, where his side lost to Santos.

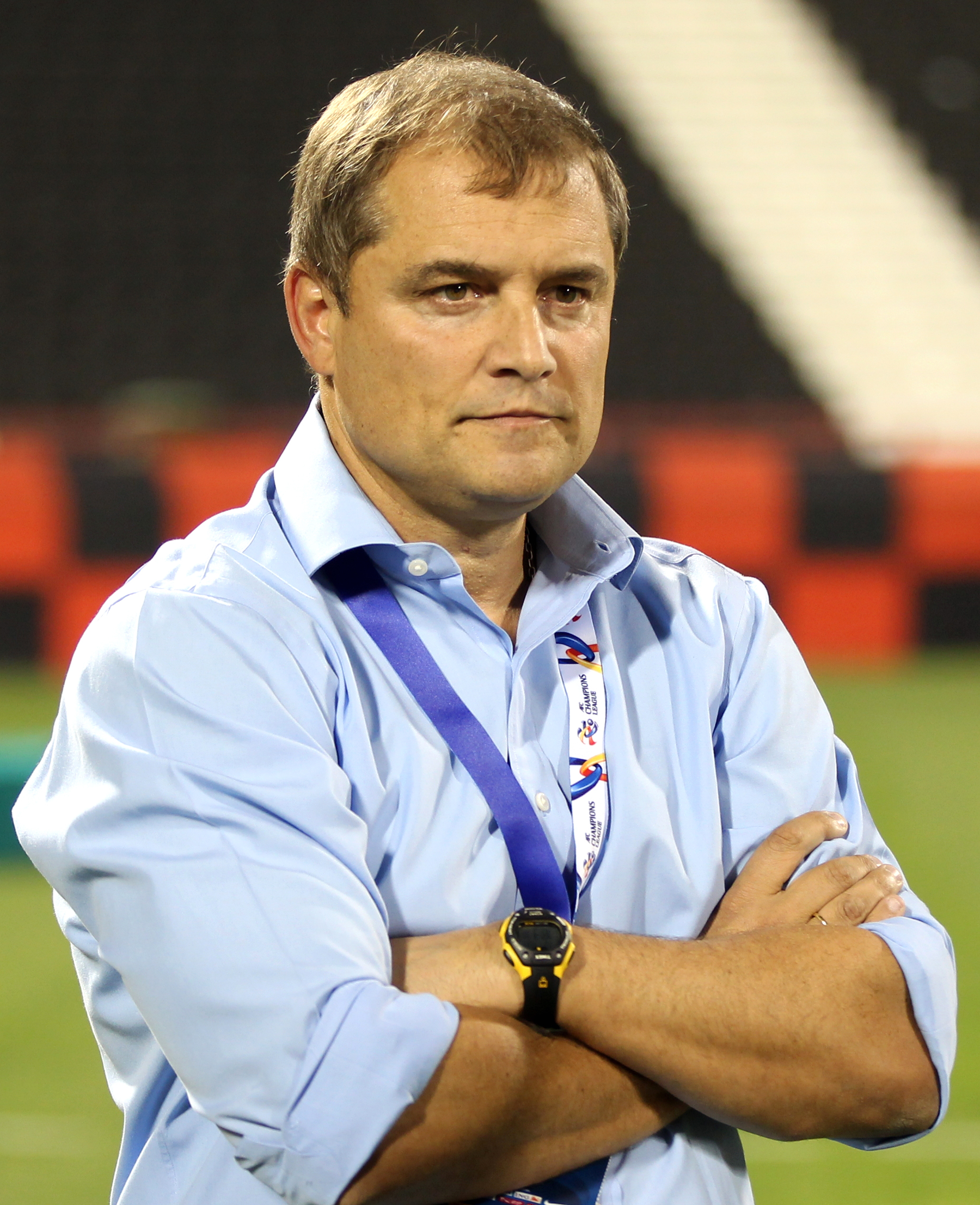
Aguirre managing Al-Rayyan in 2012

On 5 September 2011, Aguirre signed for Al-Rayyan, remaining in charge until 4 November 2013. He subsequently replaced Zico at the helm of Al-Gharafa, being appointed on 2 February 2014.

On 22 December 2014, Aguirre was named manager of another club he represented as a player, Internacional, being relieved from his duties the following 6 August. On 3 December 2015, he signed a two-year deal with Atlético Mineiro, resigning on 19 May.

On 27 June 2016, Aguirre replaced Pablo Guede at the helm of San Lorenzo. On 22 September of the following year, he resigned after being knocked out of the year's Copa Libertadores.

On 11 March 2018, Aguirre was appointed manager of another former club, São Paulo. On 11 November, after falling down from the first to the fifth position, he left the club.

Aguirre returned to Al Rayyan for a second spell in July 2019. In his first season, the club finished second in the league without to win any trophies, being also eliminated in the AFC Champions League play-off round.

During Aguirre's second season as head coach, he saw key players Hamid Ismail, Sebastián Soria and Rodrigo Tabata leaving the club, and after a poor run of results in their first matches, he announced on the media that he would be leaving the club by mutual agreement. He was linked to São Paulo in October 2020, and officially left the club after the disappointing draw against Al-Arabi on 11 December, being later replaced by French coach Laurent Blanc.

On 19 June 2021, Aguirre returned to Brazil and Internacional, after replacing Miguel Ángel Ramírez. He left the club on a mutual agreement on 15 December, after missing out a Copa Libertadores spot in the last round.

On 30 May 2022, Aguirre switched teams and countries again after being named in charge of Liga MX side Cruz Azul. He was sacked on 21 August, after a 7–0 loss to Club América.

On 11 March 2023, Aguirre replaced Julio César Cáceres at the helm of Club Olimpia in Paraguay. He was dismissed on 20 July, after a poor league campaign.

On 6 August 2023, Aguirre returned to Brazil and became Santos' third permanent head coach of the season. He was sacked on 15 September, after four defeats in just five matches, and returned to Peñarol after 12 years on 21 November.

== Managerial statistics ==
As of match played 19 November 2026

Managerial record by team and tenure
Team	Nat	From	To	Record							
Team	Nat	From	To	G	W	D	L	GF	GA	GD	Win %
Plaza Colonia	(Uruguay)	1 January 2002	31 December 2002	38	16	7	15	52	45	+7	42.11
Peñarol	(Uruguay)	1 January 2003	1 January 2005	92	50	22	20	177	115	+62	54.35
Aucas	(Ecuador)	1 January 2006	11 June 2006	11	3	3	5	13	14	−1	27.27
Montevideo Wanderers	(Uruguay)	1 January 2007	11 June 2007	17	9	2	6	34	26	+8	52.94
Alianza Lima	(Peru)	22 June 2007	30 August 2007	5	1	2	2	4	9	−5	20.00
Uruguay U20	(Uruguay)	7 November 2007	23 December 2009	15	9	3	3	32	20	+12	60.00
Peñarol	(Uruguay)	23 December 2009	6 September 2011	51	32	8	11	91	57	+34	62.75
Al-Rayyan	(Qatar)	6 September 2011	3 November 2013	72	28	17	27	142	124	+18	38.89
Al-Gharafa	(Qatar)	5 February 2014	5 June 2014	7	3	1	3	10	9	+1	42.86
Internacional	(Brazil)	1 January 2015	6 August 2015	50	26	14	10	67	46	+21	52.00
Atlético Mineiro	(Brazil)	3 December 2015	19 May 2016	30	15	7	8	53	28	+25	50.00
San Lorenzo	(Argentina)	1 July 2016	22 September 2017	57	31	10	16	96	73	+23	54.39
São Paulo	(Brazil)	12 March 2018	11 November 2018	42	17	15	10	51	37	+14	40.48
Al-Rayyan	(Qatar)	28 May 2019	10 October 2020	38	19	9	10	61	47	+14	50.00
Internacional	(Brazil)	20 June 2021	15 December 2021	35	11	12	12	39	33	+6	31.43
Cruz Azul	(Mexico)	30 May 2022	20 August 2022	11	2	3	6	14	27	−13	18.18
Olimpia	(Paraguay)	11 March 2023	20 July 2023	23	9	6	8	35	26	+9	39.13
Santos	(Brazil)	6 August 2023	15 September 2023	5	1	0	4	2	12	−10	20.00
Peñarol	(Uruguay)	21 November 2023	present	165	96	37	32	260	129	+131	58.18
Total				764	378	178	208	1,233	875	+358	49.48

== Honours ==
=== Player ===
Peñarol

- Uruguayan Primera División: 1986
- Copa Libertadores: 1987

Deportivo FAS

- Salvadoran Primera División: 1996

=== Manager ===
Peñarol

- Uruguayan Primera División: 2003, 2009–10, 2024
- Copa AUF Uruguay: 2025
- Supercopa Uruguaya: 2026

Al-Rayyan

- Qatar Crown Prince Cup: 2012
- Emir of Qatar Cup: 2013
- Sheikh Jassem Cup: 2012, 2013

Internacional

- Campeonato Gaúcho: 2015

Cruz Azul

- Supercopa de la Liga MX: 2022
