= Agustín Canobbio =

Uruguayan footballer (born 1998)

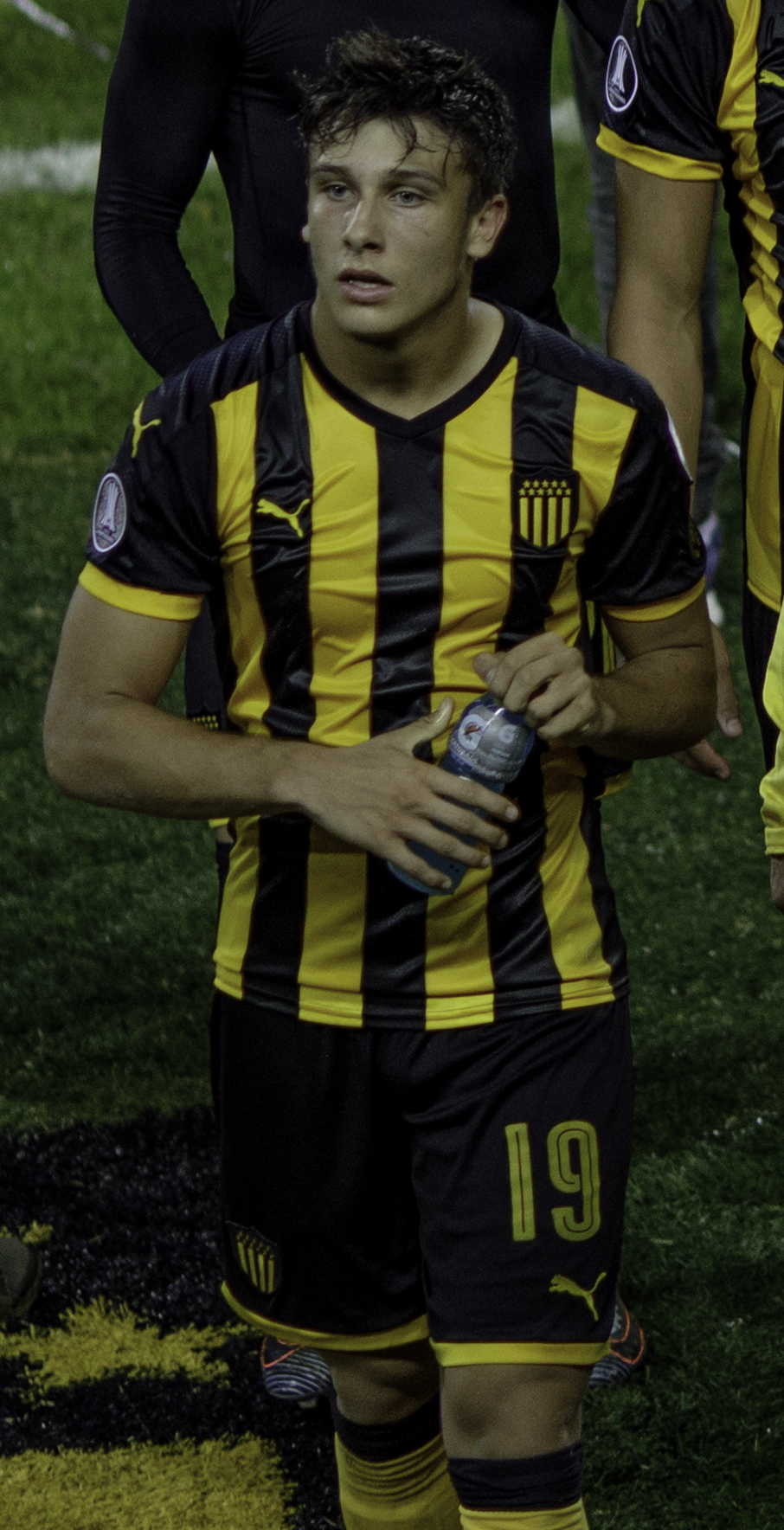
- Canobbio with Peñarol in 2018

Personal information
- Full name: Agustín Canobbio Graviz
- Date of birth: 1 October 1998 (age 28)
- Place of birth: Montevideo, Uruguay
- Height: 1.75 m (5 ft 9 in)
- Positions: Attacking midfielder; winger

Team information
- Current team: Fluminense
- Number: 17

Youth career
- 2011–2016: Fénix

Senior career*
Years	Team	Apps	(Gls)
2016–2018	Fénix	41	(3)
2018–2019	Peñarol	58	(3)
2020–2021	Fénix	22	(5)
2021–2022	Peñarol	34	(4)
2022–2025	Athletico Paranaense	100	(12)
2025–	Fluminense	72	(14)

International career^{‡}
2016–2017	Uruguay U20	21	(0)
2022–	Uruguay	20	(2)
Medal record
Men's football
Representing Uruguay
Copa América
Third place	2024 United States
South American U-20 Championship
Winner	2017 Ecuador
- * Club domestic league appearances and goals as of 18 October 2026 ‡ National team caps and goals as of 18 November 2026

Agustín Canobbio Graviz (born 1 October 1998) is a Uruguayan professional footballer who plays as an attacking midfielder or winger for Campeonato Brasileiro Série A club Fluminense and the Uruguay national team.

== Early life ==
Canobbio was born on 1 October 1998 and raised in Montevideo to former professional footballer Osvaldo Canobbio and Verónica Graviz. Through his father, Canobbio is of Italian descent and holds an Italian passport.

== Club career ==
Canobbio is a youth academy graduate of Centro Atlético Fénix. He made his professional debut for the club on 30 August 2016 in a 1–0 league defeat against Cerro.

=== Peñarol ===
After his outstanding performance with the Uruguay national under-20 football team, Canobbio joined Peñarol in 2018, playing a total of 66 matches across domestic and international competitions, and winning the Supercopa Uruguaya and the Uruguayan Primera División of that year. In 2019, the club decided to renew his contract, but after inconsistent performances, his contract was not renewed for 2020.

In 2021, after another stint at Fénix, Canobbio returned to Peñarol, where he played a key role in the Copa Sudamericana, scoring against Corinthians Paulista and River Plate Asunción in the group stages, as well as providing several assists. In the round of 16, he scored against Club Nacional de Football at the Estadio Gran Parque Central, and was also a standout in the return leg of that match. This earned him a contract renewal for the 2022 season.

=== Athletico Paranaense ===
In March 2022, Canobbio signed a five-year contract with Athletico Paranaense. The deal, negotiated by his representatives, was finalized for 3,200,000 dollars, around 2 million euros.

=== Fluminense ===
On 11 January 2025, he joined Fluminense, following Athletico's relegation at the end of 2024 season.

== International career ==
Canobbio is a former Uruguayan youth national team player. He was part of under-20 team which won the 2017 South American U-20 Championship and reached the semi-finals of the 2017 FIFA U-20 World Cup.

On 7 January 2022, Canobbio was named in Uruguay's 50-man preliminary squad for FIFA World Cup qualifying matches against Paraguay and Venezuela. However, weeks later, after Lucas Torreira and Diego Rossi tested positive for COVID-19, Canobbio was called up to cover their absences; he made his senior team debut on 27 January 2022 in a 1–0 win against Paraguay. He was eventually included in the final squad for the 2022 FIFA World Cup and the 2024 Copa América, the latter of which he would win third place under Marcelo Bielsa.

On 31 May 2026, Canobbio was named in Uruguay's 26-man squad for the 2026 FIFA World Cup. He scored his first World Cup goal in a 2–2 draw with Cape Verde. He was sent off by referee Ismail Elfath in the closing moments of Uruguay's final group stage game against Spain, which ended in a 1–0 defeat and group-stage elimination.

== Career statistics ==
=== Club ===
As of match played 21 October 2026

Appearances and goals by club, season and competition
Club	Season	League			State league (Note: Includes Campeonato Paranaense, Campeonato Carioca)		National cup (Note: Includes Copa do Brasil)		Continental		Other		Total	
Club	Season	Division	Apps	Goals	Apps	Goals	Apps	Goals	Apps	Goals	Apps	Goals	Apps	Goals
Fénix	2016	Uruguayan Primera División	14	0	—		—		0	0	—		14	0
Fénix	2017	Uruguayan Primera División	27	3	—		—		—		—		27	3
Fénix	Total		41	3	—		—		0	0	—		41	3
Peñarol	2018	Uruguayan Primera División	29	2	—		—		7 (Note: One appearance in Copa Sudamericana, five appearances in Copa Libertadores)	0	1 (Note: Appearance in Supercopa Uruguaya)	0	37	2
Peñarol	2019	Uruguayan Primera División	31	1	—		—		10 (Note: Four appearances and one goal in Copa Sudamericana, six appearances and one goal in Copa Libertadores)	2	1	0	42	3
Peñarol	Total		60	3	—		—		17	2	2	0	79	5
Fénix	2020	Uruguayan Primera División	22	5	—		—		4 (Note: Appearances in Copa Sudamericana)	0	—		26	5
Peñarol	2021	Uruguayan Primera División	30	4	—		—		11	3	—		41	7
Peñarol	2022	Uruguayan Primera División	5	0	—		—		—		—		5	0
Peñarol	Total		35	4	—		—		11	3	—		46	7
Athletico Paranaense	2022	Série A	25	2	—		2	0	12 (Note: Appearances in Copa Libertadores)	1	—		39	3
Athletico Paranaense	2023	Série A	29	3	14	2	5	1	6	0	—		54	6
Athletico Paranaense	2024	Série A	20	4	12	1	5	2	11	2	—		48	9
Athletico Paranaense	Total		74	9	26	3	12	3	29	3	—		141	18
Fluminense	2025	Série A	30	4	12	4	7	3	6	2	3 (Note: Appearances in FIFA Club World Cup)	0	58	13
Fluminense	2026	Série A	23	5	7	1	4	0	11	2	—		45	8
Fluminense	Total		53	9	19	5	11	3	17	4	3	0	103	21
Career total			275	33	45	8	23	6	78	12	5	0	436	59

=== International ===
As of match played 17 November 2026

Appearances and goals by national team and year
National team	Year	Apps	Goals
Uruguay	2022	4	0
Uruguay	2023	6	1
Uruguay	2024	3 (Note: Includes a Non-FIFA friendly played against the Basque Country, which is counted as an official match by the Uruguayan Football Association.)	0
Uruguay	2025	0	0
Uruguay	2026	7	1
Total		20	2

Scores and results list Uruguay's goal tally first, score column indicates score after each Canobbio goal.

List of international goals scored by Agustín Canobbio
No.	Date	Venue	Opponent	Score	Result	Competition
1	12 September 2023	Estadio Rodrigo Paz Delgado, Quito, Ecuador	Ecuador	1–0	1–2	2026 FIFA World Cup qualification
2	21 June 2026	Hard Rock Stadium, Miami Gardens, United States	Cape Verde	2–1	2–2	2026 FIFA World Cup

== Honours ==
Peñarol

- Uruguayan Primera División: 2018, 2021
- Supercopa Uruguaya: 2018

Athletico Paranaense

- Campeonato Paranaense: 2023

Uruguay U20

- South American Youth Football Championship: 2017

Uruguay

- Copa América third place: 2024

Individual

- Uruguayan Primera División Player of the Year: 2021
- Uruguayan Primera División Team of the Year: 2021
