= 2018 Supercopa Uruguaya =

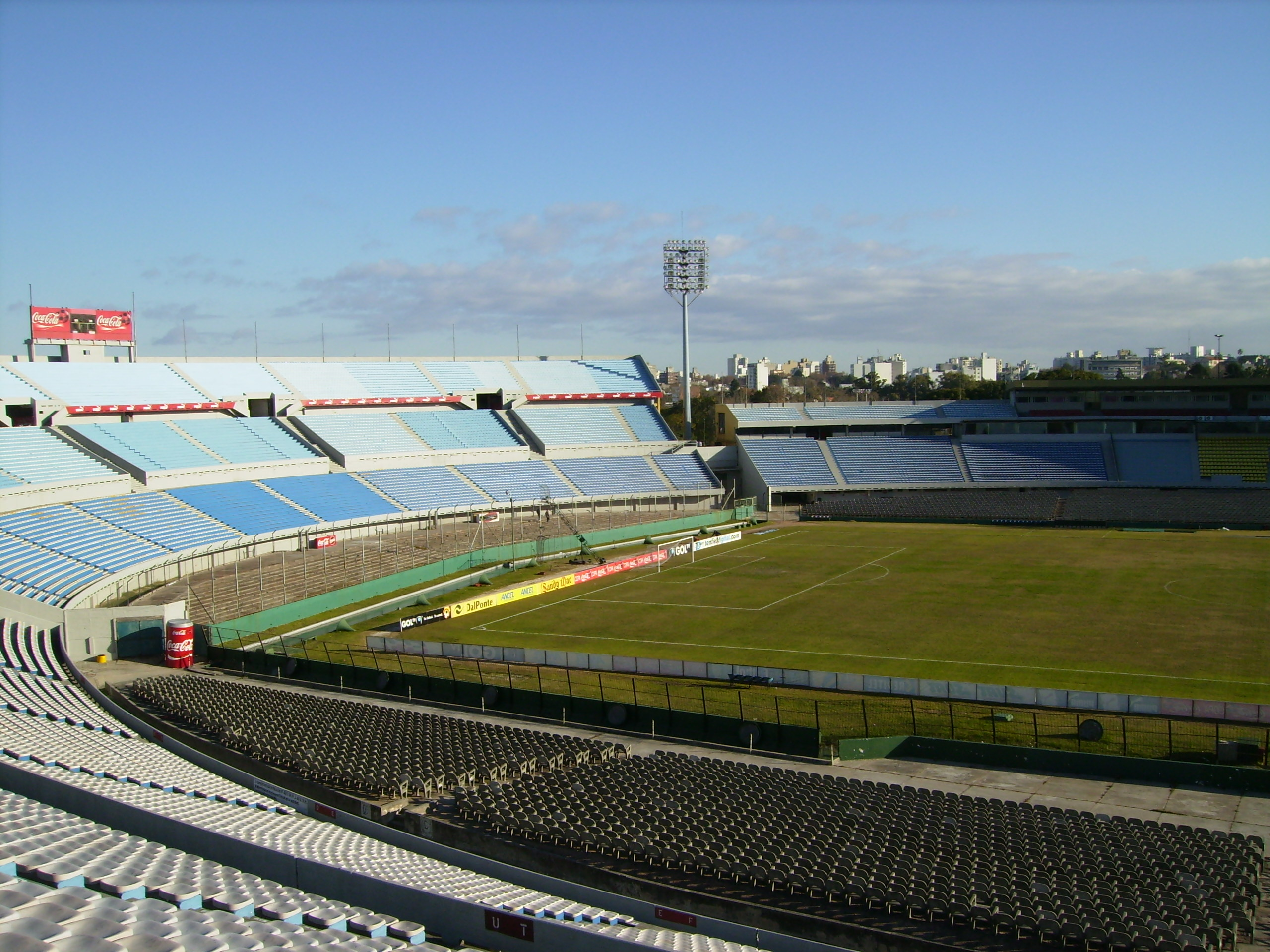
- Estadio Centenario was the venue for the match.
- Event: Supercopa Uruguaya
Nacional	Peñarol
1	3
- Date: 26 January 2018
- Venue: Estadio Centenario, Montevideo
- Referee: Christian Ferreyra
- Attendance: 35,000

The 2018 Supercopa Uruguaya was the first edition of the Supercopa Uruguaya, Uruguay's football super cup. It was held on 26 January 2018 between 2017 Torneo Intermedio winners Nacional and 2017 Primera División champions Peñarol. It was originally scheduled to be played on 28 January, however, and due to Nacional's first match in the 2018 Copa Libertadores being scheduled on 31 January, the Supercopa was moved to 26 January.

The match was played at Estadio Centenario in Montevideo. Peñarol were the winners after beating Nacional 3–1 in normal time.

== Teams ==
Team	Qualification
Nacional	2017 Intermedio winners
Peñarol	2017 Primera División champions

== Match details ==
26 January 2018
21:00 UTC−3

Nacional	1–3	Peñarol
Viudez 71'	Report	Martínez 1'; C. Rodríguez 39' (pen.); M. Rodríguez 45'

Estadio Centenario, Montevideo
Attendance: 35,000
Referee: Christian Ferreyra

Nacional	Peñarol

GK	1	(Uruguay) Esteban Conde
RB	13	(Uruguay) Matías Zunino	(yellow card) 57'
CB	21	(Uruguay) Guzmán Corujo
CB	23	(Uruguay) Diego Polenta
LB	22	(Uruguay) Alfonso Espino
CM	19	(Uruguay) Santiago Romero	(yellow card) 29'
CM	8	(Uruguay) Diego Arismendi
AM	7	(Uruguay) Luis Aguiar	(substituted off) 66'
AM	10	(Uruguay) Tabaré Viudez
FW	20	(Uruguay) Carlos de Pena	(substituted off) 46'
FW	11	(Uruguay) Leandro Barcia	(substituted off) 76'
Substitutes:
GK	12	(Panama) Luis Mejía
DF	6	(Uruguay) Alexis Rolín
MF	18	(Uruguay) Álvaro González
MF	29	(Uruguay) Christian Oliva	(substituted in) 66'
FW	9	(Uruguay) Hugo Silveira
FW	18	(Uruguay) Gonzalo Bueno	(substituted in) 76'
FW	30	(Uruguay) Sebastián Fernández	(substituted in) 46'
Manager:
(Uruguay) Alexander Medina

GK	12	(Uruguay) Kevin Dawson
RB	6	(Uruguay) Guillermo Varela
CB	2	(Uruguay) Fabricio Formiliano
CB	21	(Uruguay) Ramón Arias	(substituted off) 55'
LB	27	(Uruguay) Lucas Hernández	(yellow card) 8'
CM	23	(Uruguay) Walter Gargano	(yellow card) 42'
CM	7	(Uruguay) Cristian Rodríguez
RM	20	(Uruguay) Giovanni González	(substituted off) 54'
LM	19	(Uruguay) Agustín Canobbio	(yellow card) 57'
AM	11	(Argentina) Maximiliano Rodríguez	(substituted off) 74'
FW	9	(Ecuador) Fidel Martínez	(yellow card) 2'
Substitutes:
GK	1	(Uruguay) Thiago Cardozo
DF	15	(Uruguay) Luis Maldonado	(substituted in) 55'
DF	18	(Uruguay) Mathías Corujo
MF	5	(Uruguay) Marcel Novick
MF	14	(Uruguay) Guzmán Pereira	(substituted in) 74'
FW	16	(Uruguay) Fabián Estoyanoff	(substituted in) 54'
FW	26	(Uruguay) Gabriel Fernández
Manager:
(Uruguay) Leonardo Ramos
