= Lucas Hernández (footballer, born 1992) =

Uruguayan footballer

Personal information
- Full name: Lucas Camilo Hernández Perdomo
- Date of birth: 5 August 1992 (age 34)
- Place of birth: Montevideo, Uruguay
- Height: 1.75 m (5 ft 9 in)
- Position: Left-back

Team information
- Current team: Peñarol
- Number: 27

Youth career
- Montevideo Wanderers

Senior career*
Years	Team	Apps	(Gls)
2012–2013	Montevideo Wanderers	2	(0)
2013	→ Huracán FC (loan)	14	(0)
2014–2017	Cerro	60	(5)
2017	→ Peñarol (loan)	36	(0)
2018–2019	Peñarol	39	(5)
2019–2022	Atlético Mineiro	7	(0)
2020–2021	→ Cuiabá (loan)	19	(0)
2022	→ Sport Recife (loan)	13	(0)
2023–	Peñarol	83	(4)
- * Club domestic league appearances and goals as of 1 October 2025

Lucas Camilo Hernández Perdomo (born 5 August 1992) is a Uruguayan professional footballer who plays as a left-back for Peñarol.

== Club career ==
=== Montevideo Wanderers ===
Born in Montevideo, Hernández was a Montevideo Wanderers youth graduate. He made his first team – and Primera División – debut on 4 November 2012, coming on as a second-half substitute for Alejandro Lago in a 0–1 home loss against Bella Vista.

On 27 February 2013, after just one further appearance for Wanderers, Hernández was loaned to Segunda División side Huracán del Paso de la Arena for the remainder of the year.

=== Cerro ===
In 2014, Hernández joined Cerro, Initially assigned in the reserve team, he first appeared with the main squad on 9 March by starting in a 1–1 home draw against Sud América.

Hernández became a starter for the club from March 2015 onwards, and scored his first professional goal on 30 May, in a 2–0 home win over Rentistas.

=== Peñarol ===
On 27 January 2017, Hernández moved to Peñarol on a one-year deal. An immediate first-choice, he contributed with 36 league appearances as the club won the league.

Hernández signed permanently with the club for the 2018 season, and remained a regular starter as the club achieved a domestic double by winning the league and the Supercopa Uruguaya.

=== Atlético Mineiro ===
On 5 June 2019, Campeonato Brasileiro Série A side Atlético Mineiro announced the signing of Hernández. He made his debut abroad on 14 July, starting in a 2–1 away success over Chapecoense.

A backup to Fábio Santos, Hernández subsequently fell further down the pecking order after the arrival of Guilherme Arana.

==== Loan to Cuiabá ====
In September 2020, Hernández was loaned to Série B side Cuiabá until the end of the season. In December, however, he suffered a serious knee injury, being sidelined for the remainder of the campaign; his loan was subsequently extended for his complete recovery, with his side achieving a first-ever promotion to the top tier.

On 17 May 2021, Hernández's loan was extended until December. However, he spent the campaign as a backup to Uendel.

==== Loan to Sport Recife ====
On 21 January 2022, Hernández joined Sport Recife on a season-long loan.

== Career statistics ==
As of 30 December 2021

Club	Season	League			Cup		Continental		State League		Other		Total	
Club	Season	Division	Apps	Goals	Apps	Goals	Apps	Goals	Apps	Goals	Apps	Goals	Apps	Goals
Montevideo Wanderers	2012–13	Primera División	2	0	—		—		—		—		2	0
Huracán (loan)	2012–13	Segunda División	14	0	—		—		—		1 (Note: Appearance(s) in Relegation Play-offs)	0	15	0
Cerro	2013–14	Uruguayan Primera División	1	0	—		—		—		—		1	0
Cerro	2014–15	Uruguayan Primera División	16	1	—		—		—		—		16	1
Cerro	2015–16	Uruguayan Primera División	28	2	—		—		—		—		28	2
Cerro	2016	Uruguayan Primera División	15	2	—		—		—		—		15	2
Cerro	Subtotal		60	5	—		—		—		—		60	5
Peñarol	2017	Uruguayan Primera División	36	0	—		4 (Note: Appearance(s) in Copa Libertadores)	1	—		—		40	1
Peñarol	2018	Uruguayan Primera División	31	3	—		4 (Note: Two appearances in Copa Libertadores, two appearances in Copa Sudamericana)	0	—		1 (Note: Appearance(s) in Supercopa Uruguaya)	0	36	3
Peñarol	2019	Uruguayan Primera División	8	2	—		8 (Note: Six appearances in Copa Libertadores, two appearances in Copa Sudamericana)	0	—		1	0	17	2
Peñarol	Subtotal		75	5	—		16	1	—		2	0	93	6
Atlético Mineiro	2019	Série A	5	0	0	0	—		—		—		5	0
Atlético Mineiro	2020	Série A	0	0	0	0	0	0	2 (Note: Appearance(s) in Campeonato Mineiro)	0	—		2	0
Atlético Mineiro	Subtotal		5	0	0	0	0	0	2	0	—		7	0
Cuiabá (loan)	2020	Série B	8	0	2	0	—		—		—		10	0
Cuiabá (loan)	2021	Série A	8	0	0	0	—		0	0	1 (Note: Appearance(s) in Copa Verde)	0	9	0
Cuiabá (loan)	Subtotal		16	0	2	0	—		0	0	1	0	19	0
Career total			172	10	2	0	16	1	2	0	4	0	196	11

== Honours ==
Peñarol

- Uruguayan Primera División: 2017, 2018
- Supercopa Uruguaya: 2018

Atlético Mineiro

- Campeonato Mineiro: 2020

Cuiabá

- Campeonato Mato-Grossense: 2021
