= Eduardo Darias =

Uruguayan footballer (born 1998)

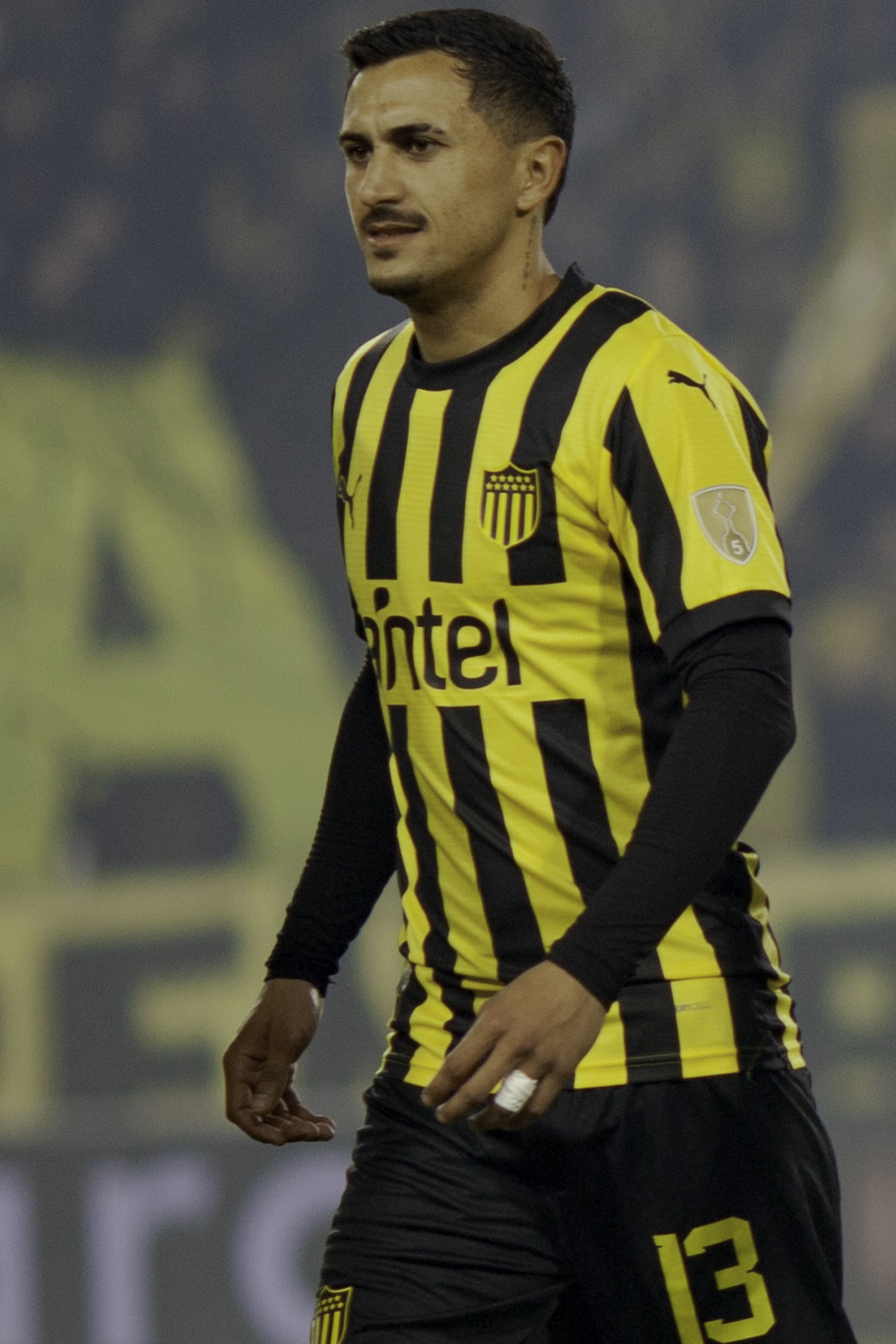
- Darias with Peñarol in 2024

Personal information
- Full name: Washington Eduardo Darias Lafuente
- Date of birth: 28 February 1998 (age 28)
- Place of birth: Toledo, Uruguay
- Height: 1.73 m (5 ft 8 in)
- Position: Midfielder

Team information
- Current team: Peñarol
- Number: 13

Senior career*
Years	Team	Apps	(Gls)
2017–2018	Central Español	37	(6)
2019–2023	Deportivo Maldonado	111	(12)
2024–	Peñarol	38	(7)
- * Club domestic league appearances and goals as of 12:24, 20 July 2026 (UTC)

Washington Eduardo Darias Lafuente (born 28 February 1998) is a Uruguayan professional footballer who plays as a midfielder for Peñarol.

== Career ==
Born in Toledo in Canelones Department, Darias began his career at Central Español. After two years, he transferred to Deportivo Maldonado also in the Uruguayan Segunda División. On 6 February 2022 year he opened the scoring in a 3–2 win at Nacional on the opening day, as the squad that came third in the Uruguayan Primera División in that season, qualifying for the Copa Libertadores.

On 4 January 2024, Darias signed for Peñarol for the whole year. He scored his first goal on 7 April as a substitute as his team came from behind to win 2–1 away to his previous employers, following four days later with a first continental goal in a 5–0 home win over Caracas in the Copa Libertadores group stage.

Darias scored after 25 seconds on 1 December 2024 in a 3–1 home win over Fénix. The result won Peñarol the Clausura tournament, thereby handing them the national title without the need for a final, as they had also won the Apertura.

In March 2025, Darias suffered an anterior cruciate ligament injury; he was the fourth Peñarol player with an ACL injury in 14 months. He did not return to training until the following January. On 1 February, he made his comeback in the 2026 Supercopa Uruguaya, a penalty shootout win against rivals Nacional after a goalless draw; he came on as a substitute in the second half of normal time and was substituted in the second half of extra time.
