= Jesús Trindade =

Uruguayan footballer (born 1993)

Personal information
- Full name: Jesús Emiliano Trindade Flores
- Date of birth: 10 July 1993 (age 33)
- Place of birth: Salto, Uruguay
- Height: 1.76 m (5 ft 9 in)
- Positions: Defensive midfielder; full-back

Team information
- Current team: Barcelona SC
- Number: 5

Youth career
- Racing Club Montevideo

Senior career*
Years	Team	Apps	(Gls)
2012–2018	Racing Club Montevideo	152	(7)
2019–2021	Peñarol	89	(4)
2022–2023	Pachuca	14	(0)
2022–2023	→ Coritiba (loan)	30	(0)
2023	→ Barcelona SC (loan)	15	(1)
2024–	Barcelona SC	26	(0)
- * Club domestic league appearances and goals as of 1 April 2025

Jesús Emiliano Trindade Flores (born 10 July 1993) is a Uruguayan professional footballer who plays as a defensive midfielder or full-back for Ecuadorian club Barcelona SC.

== Career ==
A youth academy graduate of Racing Club Montevideo, Trindade made his professional debut on 24 November 2012 in a 2–0 league defeat against Nacional. He joined Peñarol prior to the 2019 season.

== Honours ==
Peñarol

- Uruguayan Primera División: 2021
