= Luis Mejía =

Panamanian footballer (born 1991)

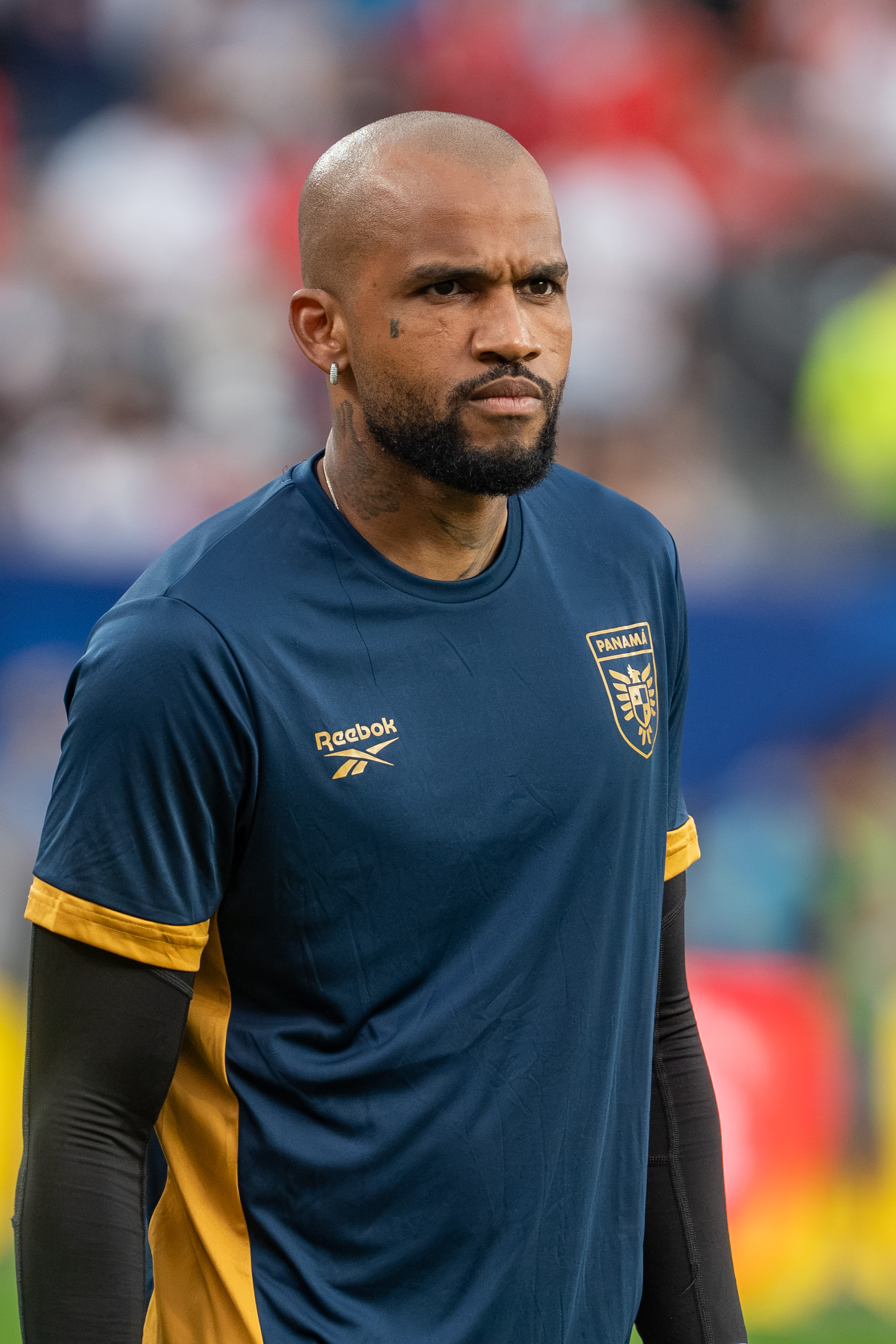
- Mejía with Panama in 2026

Personal information
- Full name: Luis Ricardo Mejía Cajar
- Date of birth: 16 March 1991 (age 35)
- Place of birth: Panama City, Panama
- Height: 1.91 m (6 ft 3 in)
- Position: Goalkeeper

Team information
- Current team: Nacional
- Number: 12

Youth career
- 2005–2007: Tauro
- 2008–2009: Fénix
- 2009: → Real Mallorca B (loan)

Senior career*
Years	Team	Apps	(Gls)
2010–2015	Fénix	89	(0)
2011	→ Toulouse FC (loan)	0	(0)
2015–2021	Nacional	51	(0)
2021	Fénix	20	(0)
2022–2024	Unión Española	21	(0)
2023	→ Racing de Montevideo (loan)	13	(0)
2024–	Nacional	85	(0)

International career^{‡}
2005–2006	Panama U17	4	(0)
2007–2010	Panama U20	10	(0)
2010	Panama U21	2	(0)
2012	Panama U23	7	(0)
2009–	Panama	56	(0)
Medal record
Men's football
Representing Panama
CONCACAF Gold Cup
Runner-up	2023 United States–Canada	Team
CONCACAF Nations League
Runner-up	2025 United States	Team
- * Club domestic league appearances and goals as of 5 October 2026 ‡ National team caps and goals as of 23:30, 27 March 2026 (UTC)

Luis Ricardo Mejía Cajar (born 16 March 1991) is a Panamanian professional footballer who plays as a goalkeeper for Uruguayan Primera División club Nacional and the Panama national team.

== Club career ==
Nicknamed Manotas, Mejia made his professional debut playing with Tauro in 2007.

In 2008, he was transferred to Uruguayan side Centro Atlético Fénix, but finally made his team debut on 21 August 2010 on a match against Tacuarembó, being rewarded as the man of the match. His outstanding performances called the interest of various team of Europe.

In January 2011, he was loaned for 6 months to Toulouse but was never able to win a place in the first team, so he had to cope with playing in the reserve team.

Upon his return to Fénix in June 2011, he cemented his position in the starting lineup of the team. In the 2012–13 Uruguayan Primera División season, he played 27 games where they conceded 37 goals in the annual table and finished in seventh position, one spot away from qualifying for the Copa Sudamericana. In the 2013–14 championship he played 18 games where Fénix conceded 22 goals, again resulting in a seventh-place position.

After several impressive seasons as a top-performing goalkeeper in the Uruguayan top flight, Mejía signed for Club Nacional in 2015. For his first three seasons at the club, he was back-up goalkeeper to Esteban Conde, but obtained the starting position in the team for the 2018 season. In 2019, he made 24 league appearance as Nacional won their forty-seventh domestic title. After losing the starting role in the team to the Uruguayan international goalkeeper Sergio Rochet for the starting role in 2020, Mejía returned to Fénix for one season, and then left Uruguay for the first time since 2011 to join Unión Española for the 2022 Chilean Primera División.

He returned to Nacional in 2024, retaking the position as the primary goalkeeper in the team following Rochet's transfer to Internacional.

== International career ==
Mejía was part of the Panama U-20 squad that participated in the 2007 FIFA U-20 World Cup in Canada. He was the youngest goalkeeper in the world cup and the revelation. He was also part of the Panama U-20 squad that participated in the 2011 CONCACAF U-20 Championship where his outstanding performances led them to qualify to the Youth World Cup in Colombia.

His senior international debut for Panama came on 8 June 2009 against Jamaica, in a Friendly match.

He was part of the Panama U-23 squad that participated in the 2012 CONCACAF Men's Olympic Qualifying Tournament which they could not qualify to the 2012 Summer Olympics.

In 2011, he was called up by Julio Dely Valdés to play the 2011 CONCACAF Gold Cup.

In the 2021 CONCACAF Gold Cup, he played 2 matches and conceded 6 goals as Panama were eliminated in the group stage. Mejía was also called up for the 2023 version of the tournament, where his side finished as runners-up as they lost the final 1-0 against Mexico at SoFi Stadium, in which he was the back-up goalkeeper to first-choice Orlando Mosquera.

He was similarly a substitute goalkeeper for the 2024 Copa América, where Panama were eliminated in the quarterfinals, eventually losing to Colombia.

== Career statistics ==
=== Club ===
As of match played 5 October 2026

Appearances and goals by club, season and competition
Club	Season	League			Cup		Continental		Other		Total	
Club	Season	Division	Apps	Goals	Apps	Goals	Apps	Goals	Apps	Goals	Apps	Goals
Fénix	2010–11	Uruguayan Primera División	13	0	—		—		—		13	0
Fénix	2011–12	Uruguayan Primera División	12	0	—		—		—		12	0
Fénix	2012–13	Uruguayan Primera División	27	0	—		—		—		27	0
Fénix	2013–14	Uruguayan Primera División	18	0	—		—		—		18	0
Fénix	2014–15	Uruguayan Primera División	19	0	—		—		—		19	0
Fénix	Total		89	0	—		—		—		89	0
Nacional	2015–16	Uruguayan Primera División	1	0	—		0	0	—		1	0
Nacional	2016	Uruguayan Primera División	0	0	—		1	0	—		1	0
Nacional	2017	Uruguayan Primera División	1	0	—		0	0	—		1	0
Nacional	2018	Uruguayan Primera División	16	0	—		0	0	0	0	16	0
Nacional	2019	Uruguayan Primera División	24	0	—		4	0	0	0	28	0
Nacional	2020	Uruguayan Primera División	9	0	—		4	0	2	0	15	0
Nacional	Total		51	0	—		9	0	2	0	62	0
Fénix	2021	Uruguayan Primera División	20	0	—		2	0	—		23	0
Unión Española	2022	Chilean Primera División	21	0	3	0	2	0	—		26	0
Unión Española	2023	Chilean Primera División	0	0	1	0	—		—		1	0
Unión Española	Total		21	0	4	0	2	0	—		27	0
Racing de Montevideo (loan)	2023	Uruguayan Primera División	13	0	1	0	—		—		14	0
Nacional	2024	Uruguayan Primera División	31	0	1	0	12	0	—		44	0
Nacional	2025	Uruguayan Primera División	32	0	0	0	6	0	1	0	39	0
Nacional	2026	Uruguayan Primera División	22	0	0	0	5	0	1	0	28	0
Nacional	Total		85	0	1	0	23	0	2	0	111	0
Career total			279	0	6	0	36	0	4	0	325	0

=== International ===
As of match played 27 March 2025

Appearances and goals by national team and year
National team	Year	Apps	Goals
Panama	2009	1	0
Panama	2010	3	0
Panama	2011	3	0
Panama	2012	2	0
Panama	2013	3	0
Panama	2015	3	0
Panama	2018	3	0
Panama	2019	6	0
Panama	2020	2	0
Panama	2021	14	0
Panama	2022	8	0
Panama	2023	3	0
Panama	2024	2	0
Panama	2025	2	0
Panama	2026	1	0
Total		56	0

== Honours ==
Club Nacional

- 2019 Uruguayan Primera División, 2020 Uruguayan Primera División

- 2019 Supercopa Uruguaya, 2025 Supercopa Uruguaya

Panama

- CONCACAF Gold Cup runner-up: 2013, 2023; third place: 2015
