= Supercopa Uruguaya =

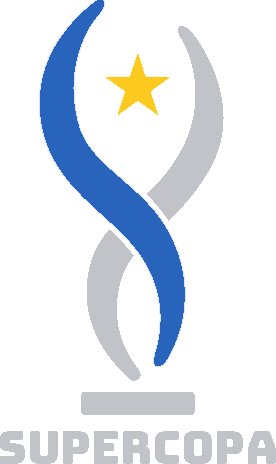
- Organiser(s): AUF
- Founded: 2018; 8 years ago
- Region: Uruguay
- Teams: 2
- Related competitions: Liga AUF Uruguaya
- Current champions: Peñarol (3rd title)
- Most championships: Liverpool; Nacional; Peñarol (3 titles each)
- 2026 Supercopa Uruguaya

The Supercopa Uruguaya (Uruguayan Supercup) is an annual one-match football official competition in Uruguay organised by the Uruguayan Football Association (AUF) which is played between the Liga AUF Uruguaya champions and the Torneo Intermedio winners of the previous season, starting from 2018. This competition serves as the season curtain-raiser and is scheduled to be played in late January or early February each year, one week before the start of the season.

With the creation of the Copa de la Liga AUF starting from 2026, it was announced that if the two teams that would compete in the Supercopa Uruguaya also reached the Copa de la Liga final, the Supercopa would act as the final match for both competitions.

== Participating clubs ==
The Supercopa Uruguaya is played between:

- The Primera División champions (Campeón Uruguayo)
- The Torneo Intermedio winners

In the event the same club wins both the league and the Torneo Intermedio, its rival in the Supercopa will be the Torneo Intermedio runner-up. Starting from 2024, the Supercopa Uruguaya was also set to played by the Copa Uruguay champions, but this has not come into fruition.

== Competition format ==
- One 90-minute game at a neutral venue
- If tied, 30 minutes of extra time are played
- If still tied at the end of extra time, penalties decide the winner

== Finals ==
- (In bracket, title count):

Ed.	Year	Champion	Score	Runner-up	Venue
1	2018	Peñarol (1)	3–1	Nacional	Estadio Centenario, Montevideo
2	2019	Nacional (1)	1–1 (4–3 p)	Peñarol	Estadio Centenario, Montevideo
3	2020	Liverpool (1)	4–2 (a.e.t.)	Nacional	Estadio Domingo Burgueño, Maldonado
4	2021	Nacional (2)	2–0	Montevideo Wanderers	Estadio Centenario, Montevideo
5	2022	Peñarol (2)	1–0 (a.e.t.)	Plaza Colonia	Estadio Domingo Burgueño, Maldonado
6	2023	Liverpool (2)	1–0	Nacional	Estadio Centenario, Montevideo
7	2024	Liverpool (3)	1–0	Defensor Sporting	Parque Alfredo Víctor Viera, Montevideo
8	2025	Nacional (3)	2–1	Peñarol	Estadio Centenario, Montevideo
9	2026	Peñarol (3)	0–0 (4–2 p)	Nacional	Estadio Centenario, Montevideo

== Performance by club ==
Club	Winners	Runners-up	Winning years	Runner-up years
Nacional	3	4	2019, 2021, 2025	2018, 2020, 2023, 2026
Peñarol	3	2	2018, 2022, 2026	2019, 2025
Liverpool	3	—	2020, 2023, 2024	—
Montevideo Wanderers	—	1	—	2021
Plaza Colonia	—	1	—	2022
Defensor Sporting	—	1	—	2024
