= 2021 Campeonato Uruguayo Primera División =

118th season of the top-tier football league in Uruguay

Liga Profesional de Primera División
- Season: 2021
- Dates: 15 May – 7 December 2021
- Champions: Peñarol (51st title)
- Relegated: Progreso; Sud América; Villa Española
- Copa Libertadores: Peñarol; Nacional; Plaza Colonia; Montevideo City Torque
- Copa Sudamericana: Cerro Largo; Montevideo Wanderers; Liverpool; River Plate
- Matches: 241
- Goals: 610 (2.53 per match)
- Top goalscorer: Maximiliano Silvera (21 goals)
- Biggest home win: Liverpool 5–0 Sud América (11 June); City Torque 5–0 Villa Española (30 October)
- Biggest away win: River Plate 0–4 Cerro Largo (2 October)
- Highest scoring: Peñarol 5–2 Boston River (30 May); Liverpool 5–2 Fénix (22 June); Fénix 3–4 River Plate (26 June); Boston River 2–5 Peñarol (26 September); City Torque 4–3 Boston River (3 October)

The 2021 Liga Profesional de Primera División season, also known as the Campeonato Uruguayo de Primera División 2021, was the 118th season of the Uruguayan Primera División, Uruguay's top-flight football league, and the 91st in which it is professional. The season, named "Dr. Tabaré Vázquez" after the late former President of Uruguay and chairman of Progreso from 1979 to 1989, started on 15 May and ended on 7 December 2021, with the starting date having been pushed back from early 2021 due to the late conclusion of the previous season owing to the COVID-19 pandemic.

The tournament was originally scheduled to start on 8 May, however its date of start was postponed for a week to 15 May per request from the Uruguayan government. Peñarol won their fifty-first league title at the end of the season, winning the Torneo Clausura and placing first in the season's aggregate table and then beating Torneo Apertura winners Plaza Colonia on penalties in the semi-final played on 7 December. Nacional were the defending champions.

== Format changes ==
For the 2021 season, the competition was scheduled to run for eight months, from May to December, and had a change from the previous editions with the elimination of the Torneo Intermedio which is usually played midway into the season and adds seven matchdays to the league schedule. This change was intended to leave extra time available to finish the season before the end of the year in the event the health emergency caused by the COVID-19 pandemic forced any suspension of matches in the course of the season. With that change, clubs only played 15 matches in the Torneo Apertura and 15 matches in the Torneo Clausura, for a total of 30 matches in the season, as well as the ones belonging to the Championship playoff for the clubs that eventually qualified for it. Matches would only be scheduled on weekends, with mid-week dates to be used only if necessary due to the pandemic.

== Teams ==
Locations of the 2021 season teams outside Montevideo.
Locations of the 2021 Primera División teams within Montevideo.

The three lowest placed teams in the relegation table of the 2020 season, Defensor Sporting, Danubio, and Cerro, were relegated to the Segunda División for the 2021 season. They were replaced by Cerrito, Sud América, and Villa Española, who were promoted from the Segunda División.

Club	Manager	City	Stadium	Capacity
Boston River	(Uruguay) Ignacio Ithurralde	Las Piedras	Parque Artigas	12,000
Cerrito	(Uruguay) Roland Marcenaro	Montevideo	Charrúa	14,000
Cerro Largo	(Uruguay) Danielo Núñez	Melo	Antonio Ubilla	9,000
Deportivo Maldonado	(Uruguay) Francisco Palladino	Maldonado	Domingo Burgueño Miguel	22,000
Fénix	(Uruguay) Ignacio Pallas	Montevideo	Parque Capurro	10,000
Liverpool	(Uruguay) Jorge Bava	Montevideo	Belvedere	10,000
Montevideo City Torque	(Uruguay) Román Cuello	Montevideo	Centenario	60,235
Montevideo Wanderers	(Uruguay) Daniel Carreño	Montevideo	Parque Alfredo Víctor Viera	11,000
Nacional	(Uruguay) Martín Ligüera	Montevideo	Gran Parque Central	34,000
Peñarol	(Uruguay) Mauricio Larriera	Montevideo	Campeón del Siglo	40,000
Plaza Colonia	(Uruguay) Eduardo Espinel	Colonia	Parque Juan Prandi	4,500
Progreso	(Uruguay) Álvaro Fuerte	Montevideo	Parque Abraham Paladino	8,000
Rentistas	(Uruguay) Diego Jaume	Montevideo	Complejo Rentistas	10,600
River Plate	(Uruguay) Gustavo Díaz	Montevideo	Parque Federico Omar Saroldi	6,000
Sud América	(Uruguay) Luis López	Minas	Juan Antonio Lavalleja	8,000
Villa Española	(Uruguay) Julio Mozzo	Montevideo	Obdulio Varela	8,000

=== Managerial changes ===
Team	Outgoing manager	Manner of departure	Date of vacancy	Position in table	Incoming manager	Date of appointment
Torneo Apertura
Villa Española	(Uruguay) Damián Santín	Resigned	18 December 2020	Pre-season	(Uruguay) Bruno Piano	1 February 2021
Sud América	(Uruguay) Maximiliano Viera	Resigned	10 February 2021	Pre-season	(Argentina) Claudio Biaggio	6 March 2021
River Plate	(Uruguay) Jorge Fossati	End of contract	29 March 2021	Pre-season	(Uruguay) Gustavo Díaz	5 April 2021
Nacional	(Uruguay) Martín Ligüera	End of caretaker spell	7 April 2021	Pre-season	(Uruguay) Alejandro Cappuccio	9 April 2021
Rentistas	(Uruguay) Alejandro Cappuccio	Resigned	7 April 2021	Pre-season	(Uruguay) Martín Varini	8 April 2021
Liverpool	(Uruguay) Marcelo Méndez	Signed by Atlético San Luis	11 June 2021	1st	(Uruguay) Gustavo Ferrín (caretaker)	11 June 2021
Liverpool	(Uruguay) Gustavo Ferrín	End of caretaker spell	17 June 2021	2nd	(Uruguay) Jorge Bava	15 June 2021
Villa Española	(Uruguay) Bruno Piano	Resigned	20 June 2021	16th	(Uruguay) Julio Mozzo	21 June 2021
Fénix	(Uruguay) Juan Ramón Carrasco	Sacked	23 June 2021	11th	(Uruguay) Murad Djellatian (caretaker)	23 June 2021
Boston River	(Uruguay) Juan Tejera	Sacked	23 June 2021	15th	(Uruguay) Ignacio Ithurralde	23 June 2021
Fénix	(Uruguay) Murad Djellatian	End of caretaker spell	26 June 2021	11th	(Uruguay) Ignacio Pallas	26 June 2021
Montevideo City Torque	(Argentina) Pablo Marini	End of contract	30 June 2021	7th	(Uruguay) Román Cuello	25 June 2021
Progreso	(Uruguay) Maximiliano Viera	Resigned	20 August 2021	15th	(Uruguay) Álvaro Fuerte	20 August 2021
Nacional	(Uruguay) Alejandro Cappuccio	Mutual consent	22 August 2021	2nd	(Uruguay) Martín Ligüera	22 August 2021
Torneo Clausura
Rentistas	(Uruguay) Martín Varini	Mutual consent	2 October 2021	16th	(Uruguay) Diego Jaume	3 October 2021
Sud América	(Argentina) Claudio Biaggio	Mutual consent	4 October 2021	12th	(Uruguay) Luis López	5 October 2021

== Torneo Apertura ==
The Torneo Apertura, named "Eduardo Roca Couture", was the first tournament of the 2021 season. It began on 15 May and ended on 22 August 2021.

=== Standings ===
Pos	Team	Pld	W	D	L	GF	GA	GD	Pts	Qualification
1	Plaza Colonia	15	11	3	1	20	7	+13	36	Qualification for Championship playoff
2	Nacional	15	9	2	4	23	14	+9	29	
3	Peñarol	15	7	7	1	22	10	+12	28	
4	Liverpool	15	8	3	4	38	20	+18	27	
5	River Plate	15	7	5	3	27	20	+7	26	
6	Montevideo City Torque	15	8	1	6	26	19	+7	25	
7	Fénix	15	6	3	6	20	22	−2	21	
8	Cerro Largo	15	6	2	7	20	22	−2	20	
9	Cerrito	15	5	4	6	14	15	−1	19	
10	Sud América	15	5	3	7	15	22	−7	18	
11	Montevideo Wanderers	15	5	2	8	12	16	−4	17	
12	Rentistas	15	4	4	7	12	21	−9	16	
13	Boston River	15	3	5	7	14	19	−5	14	
14	Deportivo Maldonado	15	3	5	7	11	22	−11	14	
15	Progreso	15	2	5	8	13	26	−13	11	
16	Villa Española	15	1	6	8	14	26	−12	9	

Source: AUF, Soccerway
Rules for classification: 1) Points, 2) Playoff game, in case two teams are tied for first place.
If there are more than two teams tied in points: 2) Goal difference, 3) Goals for, 4) Head-to-head record, 5) Drawing of lots, 6) Playoff game, in case two teams are still tied for first place.

=== Results ===
Home \ Away	BOR	CSC	CRL	DMA	FNX	LIV	MCT	WAN	NAC	PEÑ	PCO	PRO	REN	RIV	SUD	VES
Boston River	—	—	1–0	—	0–2	1–1	1–2	—	1–1	—	—	—	1–2	—	2–0	—
Cerrito	1–0	—	—	0–0	—	—	—	—	2–0	—	1–2	0–0	0–1	3–1	—	—
Cerro Largo	—	3–1	—	—	1–2	—	—	2–0	—	0–1	—	—	—	2–4	2–1	3–1
Deportivo Maldonado	0–2	—	2–1	—	0–0	2–4	—	—	—	—	0–1	1–1	—	0–0	1–3	—
Fénix	—	1–3	—	—	—	—	—	2–1	—	0–0	0–1	2–1	—	3–4	—	1–0
Liverpool	—	3–0	3–0	—	5–2	—	—	2–1	—	3–3	—	—	—	—	5–0	2–2
Montevideo City Torque	—	0–2	3–0	2–3	2–0	0–3	—	2–1	3–0	0–1	—	—	—	—	0–1	—
Montevideo Wanderers	1–0	1–0	—	0–0	—	—	—	—	—	0–0	0–2	2–0	—	1–2	—	3–0
Nacional	—	—	1–2	2–0	3–1	1–0	—	3–0	—	2–0	—	—	—	—	1–0	3–0
Peñarol	5–2	2–0	—	4–0	—	—	—	—	—	—	0–0	1–0	1–1	2–0	—	1–1
Plaza Colonia	0–0	—	1–1	—	—	2–1	1–0	—	1–2	—	—	—	2–0	—	1–0	—
Progreso	1–0	—	0–0	—	—	1–3	1–4	—	1–3	—	1–2	—	2–2	—	—	—
Rentistas	—	—	1–3	0–2	0–3	2–1	0–2	0–1	1–1	—	—	—	—	—	1–2	—
River Plate	1–1	—	—	—	—	3–2	3–3	—	2–0	—	0–1	4–0	0–0	—	—	—
Sud América	—	0–0	—	—	1–1	—	—	1–0	—	1–1	—	2–4	—	1–2	—	2–1
Villa Española	2–2	1–1	—	2–0	—	—	2–3	—	—	—	1–3	0–0	0–1	1–1	—	—

Source: AUF, Soccerway
Legend: Blue = home team win; Yellow = draw; Red = away team win.

== Torneo Clausura ==
The Torneo Clausura, named "Marcos Basiaco", was the second and last tournament of the 2021 season. It began on 11 September and ended on 5 December 2021.

=== Standings ===
Pos	Team	Pld	W	D	L	GF	GA	GD	Pts	Qualification
1	Peñarol	15	9	5	1	27	11	+16	32	Qualification for Championship playoff
2	Nacional (Note: Nacional were awarded two points and Cerro Largo were deducted one point due to a breach of rules by Cerro Largo manager Danielo Núñez during the match between both teams.)	15	8	4	3	23	15	+8	30	
3	Montevideo Wanderers	15	8	3	4	23	18	+5	27	
4	Cerro Largo	15	6	9	0	24	11	+13	26	
5	Montevideo City Torque	15	7	4	4	26	19	+7	25	
6	Progreso	15	7	4	4	12	7	+5	25	
7	Boston River	15	6	5	4	24	24	0	23	
8	Cerrito	15	6	3	6	20	22	−2	21	
9	Plaza Colonia	15	5	5	5	20	18	+2	20	
10	Fénix	15	4	7	4	18	18	0	19	
11	River Plate	15	4	4	7	18	22	−4	16	
12	Liverpool	15	4	3	8	15	19	−4	15	
13	Deportivo Maldonado	15	4	3	8	12	18	−6	15	
14	Rentistas	15	4	2	9	18	24	−6	14	
15	Sud América	15	3	4	8	14	26	−12	13	
16	Villa Española	15	1	3	11	12	34	−22	6	

Source: AUF, Soccerway
Rules for classification: 1) Points, 2) Playoff game, in case two teams are tied for first place.
If there are more than two teams tied in points: 2) Goal difference, 3) Goals for, 4) Head-to-head record, 5) Drawing of lots, 6) Playoff game, in case two teams are still tied for first place.

=== Results ===
Home \ Away	BOR	CSC	CRL	DMA	FNX	LIV	MCT	WAN	NAC	PEÑ	PCO	PRO	REN	RIV	SUD	VES
Boston River	—	3–2	—	2–1	—	—	—	1–3	—	2–5	2–0	0–0	—	1–2	—	1–0
Cerrito	—	—	1–1	—	2–4	2–1	0–2	2–2	—	1–3	—	—	—	—	2–0	1–0
Cerro Largo	1–1	—	—	1–1	—	3–0	1–1	—	1–1	—	1–0	1–0	1–1	—	—	—
Deportivo Maldonado	—	0–1	—	—	—	—	2–1	1–3	1–0	1–0	—	—	2–1	—	—	0–1
Fénix	0–0	—	1–4	2–1	—	1–1	1–1	—	1–2	—	—	—	3–1	—	1–2	—
Liverpool	2–2	—	—	1–0	—	—	1–3	—	2–2	—	0–1	0–1	0–1	3–1	—	—
Montevideo City Torque	4–3	—	—	—	—	—	—	—	—	—	2–2	1–0	1–2	1–1	—	5–0
Montevideo Wanderers	—	—	1–2	—	1–1	1–0	0–1	—	1–0	—	—	—	2–1	—	4–1	—
Nacional	3–2	1–0	—	—	—	—	2–0	—	—	—	2–1	0–1	2–2	4–2	—	—
Peñarol	—	—	2–2	—	0–0	1–0	3–1	3–0	0–0	—	—	—	—	—	3–1	—
Plaza Colonia	—	3–3	—	1–0	1–1	—	—	0–1	—	1–2	—	2–1	—	0–0	—	4–0
Progreso	—	0–1	—	2–0	1–0	—	—	3–1	—	0–0	—	—	—	1–0	0–0	1–1
Rentistas	1–2	1–2	—	—	—	—	—	—	—	0–1	2–3	0–1	—	1–0	—	3–1
River Plate	—	1–0	0–4	1–2	0–0	—	—	0–1	—	1–1	—	—	—	—	5–1	4–2
Sud América	1–2	—	0–0	1–1	—	0–1	1–2	—	0–2	—	1–1	—	3–1	—	—	—
Villa Española	—	—	1–1	—	1–2	0–3	—	2–2	1–2	1–3	—	—	—	—	1–2	—

Source: AUF, Soccerway
Legend: Blue = home team win; Yellow = draw; Red = away team win.

== Aggregate table ==
Pos	Team	Pld	W	D	L	GF	GA	GD	Pts	Qualification
1	Peñarol (C)	30	16	12	2	49	21	+28	60	Qualification for Championship playoff and Copa Libertadores group stage
2	Nacional (Note: Nacional were awarded two points and Cerro Largo were deducted one point due to a breach of rules by Cerro Largo manager Danielo Núñez during the Torneo Clausura match between both teams.)	30	17	6	7	46	29	+17	59	Qualification for Copa Libertadores group stage
3	Plaza Colonia	30	16	8	6	40	25	+15	56	Qualification for Championship playoff and Copa Libertadores second stage
4	Montevideo City Torque	30	15	5	10	52	38	+14	50	Qualification for Copa Libertadores first stage
5	Cerro Largo	30	12	11	7	44	33	+11	46	Qualification for Copa Sudamericana first stage
6	Montevideo Wanderers	30	13	5	12	35	34	+1	44	Qualification for Copa Sudamericana first stage
7	Liverpool	30	12	6	12	53	39	+14	42	Qualification for Copa Sudamericana first stage
8	River Plate	30	11	9	10	45	42	+3	42	Qualification for Copa Sudamericana first stage
9	Fénix	30	10	10	10	38	40	−2	40	
10	Cerrito	30	11	7	12	34	37	−3	40	
11	Boston River	30	9	9	12	38	44	−6	36	
12	Progreso	30	9	9	12	25	33	−8	36	
13	Deportivo Maldonado	30	8	7	15	24	40	−16	31	
14	Sud América	30	8	7	15	29	48	−19	31	
15	Rentistas	30	8	6	16	30	45	−15	30	
16	Villa Española	30	2	9	19	26	60	−34	15	

Source: AUF
Rules for classification: 1) Points, 2) Playoff game, in case two teams are tied for first place.
If there are more than two teams tied in points: 2) Goal difference, 3) Goals for, 4) Head-to-head record, 5) Drawing of lots, 6) Playoff game, in case two teams are still tied for first place.
(C) Champions

== Championship playoff ==
Semi-final		Finals
		Peñarol (Aggregate table first place)	—	—	—
Plaza Colonia (Apertura winners)	1 (7)	Peñarol (Semi-final winners)	—	—	—
Peñarol (Clausura winners) (p)	1 (8)

=== Semi-final ===
7 December 2021
20:30 UTC−3

Plaza Colonia	1–1 (a.e.t.)	Peñarol
López 35' (pen.)	Report	Torres 40'
Penalties
Mascia (penalty scored); Ruiz Díaz (penalty scored); Umeres (penalty scored); Calleros (penalty missed); Leonai (penalty scored); Suhr (penalty scored); Redín (penalty scored); Olivera (penalty scored); Zeballos (penalty missed)	7–8	(penalty scored) Álvarez Martínez; (penalty missed) Musto; (penalty scored) Canobbio; (penalty scored) Bentancourt; (penalty scored) Álvarez Wallace; (penalty scored) Busquets; (penalty scored) Elizalde; (penalty scored) González; (penalty scored) Gaitán

Estadio Centenario, Montevideo
Referee: Daniel Fedorczuk

=== Finals ===
Since Peñarol, who had the best record in the aggregate table, won the semi-final, they became champions automatically and the finals were not played. Nacional became runners-up as the second-placed team in the aggregate table. Both teams qualified for the 2022 Copa Libertadores group stage.

Primera División
2021 Champions
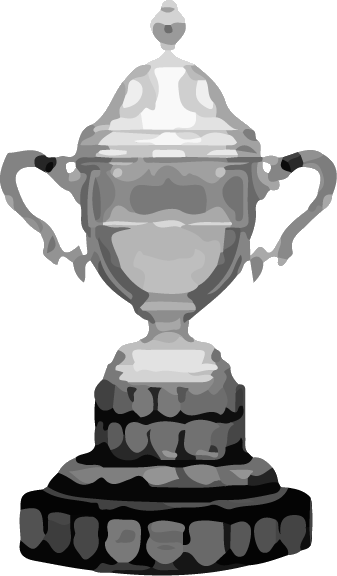

51st title

== Top scorers ==
Rank	Name	Club	Goals
1	(Uruguay) Maximiliano Silvera	Cerrito	21
2	(Uruguay) Matías Arezo	River Plate	16
3	(Argentina) Gonzalo Bergessio	Nacional	15
4	(Uruguay) Federico Martínez	Liverpool	14
5	(Uruguay) Agustín Álvarez Martínez	Peñarol	13
5	(Uruguay) Leandro Otormín	Cerro Largo	13
7	(Uruguay) Juan Ignacio Ramírez	Liverpool	11
8	(Uruguay) Sebastián Guerrero	Montevideo City Torque	10
8	(Uruguay) Salomón Rodríguez	Rentistas	10
10	(Argentina) Lucas Di Yorio	Cerro Largo	9
10	(Uruguay) Renzo López	Montevideo Wanderers / Plaza Colonia	9
10	(Uruguay) Lucas Rodríguez	Montevideo City Torque	9

Source: AUF

== Relegation ==
Relegation is determined at the end of the season by computing an average of the number of points earned per game over the two most recent seasons: 2020 and 2021. The three teams with the lowest average at the end of the season were relegated to the Segunda División for the following season.

Pos	Team	2020 Pts	2021 Pts	Total Pts	Total Pld	Avg	Relegation
1	Nacional	69	59	128	67	1.91	
2	Peñarol	65	60	125	67	1.866	
3	Montevideo City Torque	61	50	110	67	1.642	
4	Liverpool	65	42	107	67	1.597	
5	Plaza Colonia	46	56	102	67	1.522	
6	Cerro Largo	50	46	96	67	1.433	
7	Montevideo Wanderers	52	44	96	67	1.433	
8	River Plate	49	42	91	67	1.358	
9	Cerrito	—	40	40	30	1.333	
10	Fénix	49	40	89	67	1.328	
11	Rentistas	47	30	77	67	1.149	
12	Deportivo Maldonado	46	31	77	67	1.149	
13	Boston River	40	36	76	67	1.134	
14	Progreso (R)	38	36	74	67	1.104	Relegation to Segunda División
15	Sud América (R)	—	31	31	30	1.033	Relegation to Segunda División
16	Villa Española (R)	—	15	15	30	0.5	Relegation to Segunda División

== Season awards ==
On 28 December 2021 the AUF announced the winners of the season awards, who were chosen by its Technical Staff based on voting by managers and captains of the 16 Primera División teams as well as a group of local sports journalists. 30 players were nominated for Best Player and the Team of the Season according to their ratings and evaluations by the Technical Staff throughout the season.

Award	Winner	Club
Best Player	(Uruguay) Agustín Canobbio	Peñarol
Youth Talent	(Uruguay) Agustín Álvarez Martínez	Peñarol
Best Goal	(Uruguay) Matías Arezo (against Nacional, Torneo Apertura Round 15)	River Plate
Best Save	(Uruguay) Sebastián Lentinelly (against River Plate, Torneo Clausura Round 2)	Liverpool
Public's Player (Note: Chosen by public voting on the competition's social network accounts.)	(Argentina) Gonzalo Bergessio	Nacional
Best Manager	(Uruguay) Mauricio Larriera	Peñarol
Best Newcomer	(Uruguay) Ignacio Sosa	Fénix
Top Scorer	(Uruguay) Maximiliano Silvera (21 goals in 30 games played)	Cerrito
Least beaten goal in regular season	Peñarol (21 goals conceded)	
Most minutes on field	(Uruguay) Gonzalo Falcón (2,700 minutes in 30 games played)	Boston River
Fair Play Award	Peñarol	
Best Referee	Andrés Matonte	
Best Assistant referee	Martín Soppi	

Team of the Season
Goalkeeper	Defenders	Midfielders	Forwards	Bench
(Uruguay) Sergio Rochet (Nacional)	(Uruguay) Giovanni González (Peñarol) (Uruguay) Haibrany Ruiz Díaz (Plaza Colonia) (Uruguay) Gary Kagelmacher (Peñarol) (Uruguay) Andrew Teuten (Montevideo City Torque)	(Uruguay) Agustín Canobbio (Peñarol) (Uruguay) Walter Gargano (Peñarol) (Brazil) Leonai (Plaza Colonia) (Uruguay) Facundo Torres (Peñarol)	(Uruguay) Maximiliano Silvera (Cerrito) (Uruguay) Agustín Álvarez Martínez (Peñarol)	(Uruguay) Santiago Mele (Plaza Colonia) (Uruguay) Gonzalo Camargo (Plaza Colonia) (Uruguay) Ángel Cayetano (Cerro Largo) (Uruguay) Jesús Trindade (Peñarol) (Uruguay) César Araújo (Montevideo Wanderers) (Uruguay) Leandro Otormín (Cerro Largo) (Argentina) Gonzalo Bergessio (Nacional)
