= 2017 Campeonato Uruguayo Primera División =

114th season of the top-tier football league in Uruguay

Liga Profesional de Primera División
- Season: 2017
- Dates: 4 February – 17 December 2017
- Champions: Peñarol (49th title)
- Relegated: Sud América; Juventud; Plaza Colonia
- Copa Libertadores: Peñarol; Defensor Sporting; Nacional; Montevideo Wanderers
- Copa Sudamericana: Cerro; Boston River; Rampla Juniors; Danubio
- Matches: 302
- Goals: 799 (2.65 per match)
- Top goalscorer: Apertura: Cristian Palacios (15 goals); Intermedio: Rodrigo Aguirre (6 goals); Clausura: Maureen Franco and Cristian Palacios (10 goals each); Season: Cristian Palacios (29 goals)
- Biggest home win: Nacional 5–0 Boston River (9 November); Liverpool 5–0 Danubio (26 November)
- Biggest away win: Sud América 0–6 Cerro (25 February)
- Highest scoring: Danubio 4–4 Fénix (18 February)

The 2017 Liga Profesional de Primera División season, also known as the Campeonato Uruguayo 2017, was the 114th season of Uruguay's top-flight football league, and the 87th in which it is professional. Nacional were the defending champions. Peñarol were the champions after winning the Torneo Clausura and defeating Apertura winners Defensor Sporting at the championship playoff via penalty shoot-out.

== Format ==
The season was played under the Apertura-Clausura format, with the Apertura being played from February to May and the Clausura from August to November, and the inclusion of an additional tournament between the Apertura and Clausura named Torneo Intermedio and played from May to July. In the Intermedio, the 16 teams were split into two groups of eight with each club facing the others in their group once, and both group winners played the final. All three tournaments of the season counted for the aggregate table. If the best team in the aggregate table did not win the Apertura or Clausura, it would have gained a berth to the finals, but if one team won both tournaments it would automatically win the championship. The worst three teams in the relegation table were relegated, taking into account the 2016 and 2017 seasons. Also, the Torneo Intermedio winners would qualify for the 2018 Copa Sudamericana in case they failed to secure an international berth at the end of the season.

== Teams ==
Locations of the 2017 season teams outside Montevideo.
Locations of the 2017 Primera División teams within Montevideo.

Club	City	Stadium	Capacity
Boston River	Montevideo	José Nasazzi	5,002
Cerro	Montevideo	Luis Tróccoli	24,000
Danubio	Montevideo	Jardines Del Hipódromo	14,401
Defensor Sporting	Montevideo	Luis Franzini	18,000
El Tanque Sisley	Florida	Campeones Olímpicos	7,000
Fénix	Montevideo	Parque Capurro	5,500
Juventud	Las Piedras	Parque Artigas	5,500
Liverpool	Montevideo	Belvedere	10,000
Montevideo Wanderers	Montevideo	Parque Alfredo Víctor Viera	7,420
Nacional	Montevideo	Gran Parque Central	23,500
Peñarol	Montevideo	Campeón del Siglo	40,000
Plaza Colonia	Colonia	Profesor Alberto Suppici	12,000
Racing	Montevideo	Osvaldo Roberto	4,500
Rampla Juniors	Montevideo	Olímpico	9,500
River Plate	Montevideo	Parque Federico Omar Saroldi	5,624
Sud América	Montevideo	Parque Palermo	6,500

== Torneo Apertura ==
=== Standings ===
Pos	Team	Pld	W	D	L	GF	GA	GD	Pts	Qualification
1	Defensor Sporting	15	11	3	1	25	13	+12	36	Qualification to Championship playoff
2	Nacional	15	11	2	2	26	15	+11	35	
3	Peñarol	15	7	7	1	29	12	+17	28	
4	Cerro	15	7	4	4	26	18	+8	25	
5	Boston River	15	7	2	6	21	15	+6	23	
6	Montevideo Wanderers	15	7	1	7	26	24	+2	22	
7	Rampla Juniors	15	6	3	6	20	23	−3	21	
8	Danubio	15	4	7	4	17	16	+1	19	
9	El Tanque Sisley	15	6	1	8	20	29	−9	19	
10	River Plate	15	4	6	5	14	17	−3	18	
11	Fénix	15	4	4	7	21	20	+1	16	
12	Racing	15	4	3	8	16	23	−7	15	
13	Liverpool	15	3	6	6	14	23	−9	15	
14	Juventud	15	3	5	7	19	24	−5	14	
15	Plaza Colonia	15	3	5	7	16	22	−6	14	
16	Sud América	15	2	3	10	18	34	−16	9	

Source: AUF, Soccerway
Rules for classification: 1) Points, 2) Playoff game, in case two teams are tied in points for first place.
If there are more than two teams tied in points: 2) Goal difference, 3) Goals for, 4) Head-to-head record, 5) Drawing of lots, 6) Playoff game in case two teams are tied in points for first place

=== Results ===
Home \ Away	BOR	CRR	DAN	DFS	ETS	FNX	JUV	LIV	WAN	NAC	PEÑ	PCO	RAC	RAJ	RIV	SUD
Boston River	—	—	0–3	—	—	—	—	3–1	—	3–1	—	—	0–1	4–0	2–0	1–0
Cerro	2–0	—	—	—	4–3	1–0	—	2–1	1–2	1–3	—	—	1–0	1–2	—	—
Danubio	—	1–1	—	0–2	—	4–4	1–0	0–0	0–0	—	—	—	1–0	—	0–0	—
Defensor Sporting	1–0	1–1	—	—	3–0	—	2–1	—	—	3–2	2–2	1–3	—	1–0	—	—
El Tanque Sisley	1–0	—	2–4	—	—	—	—	—	—	0–1	—	—	3–2	2–0	2–2	2–1
Fénix	1–2	—	—	1–2	2–1	—	1–1	—	—	0–1	2–2	4–1	—	—	—	—
Juventud	2–5	1–1	—	—	3–0	—	—	—	—	0–1	0–2	0–2	—	2–2	—	2–2
Liverpool	—	—	—	0–1	1–2	2–1	2–2	—	0–4	—	0–0	1–0	—	—	—	—
Montevideo Wanderers	2–1	—	—	2–3	1–2	0–2	1–2	—	—	—	0–4	3–1	—	—	—	—
Nacional	—	—	2–1	—	—	—	—	3–0	2–1	—	—	—	3–2	1–0	0–0	4–3
Peñarol	0–0	1–2	1–0	—	4–0	—	—	—	—	1–1	—	—	—	3–2	1–1	4–0
Plaza Colonia	0–0	2–2	0–0	—	1–0	—	—	—	—	0–1	1–1	—	—	0–1	—	2–3
Racing	—	—	—	0–0	—	1–0	0–2	1–1	0–3	—	1–3	2–2	—	—	—	—
Rampla Juniors	—	—	2–0	—	—	2–1	—	2–2	4–3	—	—	—	0–3	—	3–0	0–0
River Plate	—	1–0	—	0–1	—	0–0	2–1	1–1	1–2	—	—	3–1	1–2	—	—	—
Sud América	—	0–6	2–2	1–2	—	0–2	—	1–2	1–2	—	—	—	3–1	—	1–2	—

Source: AUF, Soccerway
Legend: Blue = home team win; Yellow = draw; Red = away team win.

=== Top goalscorers ===
Rank	Name	Club	Goals
1	(Uruguay) Cristian Palacios	Montevideo Wanderers	15
2	(Uruguay) Maureen Franco	Cerro	12
3	(Uruguay) Maximiliano Gómez	Defensor Sporting	10
4	(Uruguay) Fabián Estoyanoff	Fénix	8
5	(Uruguay) Facundo Rodríguez	Boston River	7

Source: Soccerway

== Torneo Intermedio ==
The Torneo Intermedio was played between the Apertura and Clausura tournaments, and consisted of two groups of eight teams whose composition depended on the final standings of the Torneo Apertura: teams in odd-numbered positions played in Serie A, while teams in even-numbered positions played in Serie B. In each group, teams played each other once, and both group winners played the Torneo Intermedio final, with its winner being assured of a Copa Sudamericana berth in case it failed to qualify for CONMEBOL competitions through the aggregate table. The Intermedio winner also had the chance to play the Supercopa Uruguaya against the Primera División champion.

=== Serie A ===
Pos	Team	Pld	W	D	L	GF	GA	GD	Pts	Qualification	DFS	PEÑ	RAJ	BOR	FNX	PCO	LIV	ETS
1	Defensor Sporting	7	5	2	0	15	7	+8	17	Advance to Torneo Intermedio Final	—	—	—	3–1	—	—	2–0	2–2
2	Peñarol	7	5	1	1	17	7	+10	16		2–3	—	4–1	—	3–0	4–1	—	—
3	Rampla Juniors	7	3	2	2	7	8	−1	11		1–2	—	—	1–0	1–1	—	1–0	—
4	Boston River	7	3	1	3	9	9	0	10		—	0–0	—	—	—	0–1	—	3–1
5	Fénix	7	2	3	2	8	10	−2	9		1–1	—	—	1–2	—	—	1–1	2–1
6	Plaza Colonia	7	1	3	3	4	9	−5	6		0–2	—	0–0	—	1–2	—	—	—
7	Liverpool	7	1	2	4	7	10	−3	5		—	1–2	—	2–3	—	1–1	—	2–0
8	El Tanque Sisley	7	0	2	5	6	13	−7	2		—	1–2	1–2	—	—	0–0	—	—

Source: AUF, Soccerway
Legend: Blue = home team win; Yellow = draw; Red = away team win.
Rules for classification: 1) Points, 2) Playoff game, in case two teams are tied in points for first place.
If there are more than two teams tied in points: 2) Goal difference, 3) Goals for, 4) Head-to-head record, 5) Drawing of lots, 6) Playoff game in case two teams are tied in points for first place

=== Serie B ===
Pos	Team	Pld	W	D	L	GF	GA	GD	Pts	Qualification	NAC	WAN	RAC	CRR	DAN	JUV	SUD	RIV
1	Nacional	7	6	1	0	16	5	+11	19	Advance to Torneo Intermedio Final	—	1–1	—	—	—	3–1	—	2–1
2	Montevideo Wanderers	7	5	2	0	9	3	+6	17		—	—	—	1–0	—	—	2–0	2–2
3	Racing	7	4	1	2	8	6	+2	13		1–3	0–1	—	—	—	1–0	—	1–1
4	Cerro	7	2	2	3	7	8	−1	8		0–2	—	0–2	—	3–0	—	2–1	—
5	Danubio (Note: Danubio were awarded two points and Sud América were deducted one point due to a breach of rules by Sud América manager Damián Timpani during the Torneo Intermedio match between both teams.)	7	1	2	4	5	9	−4	7		1–2	0–1	1–2	—	—	0–0	—	—
6	Juventud	7	1	3	3	5	8	−3	6		—	0–1	—	1–1	—	—	2–2	1–0
7	Sud América	7	1	2	4	6	11	−5	4		0–3	—	0–1	—	1–1	—	—	—
8	River Plate	7	0	3	4	5	11	−6	3		—	—	—	1–1	0–2	—	0–2	—

Source: AUF, Soccerway
Legend: Blue = home team win; Yellow = draw; Red = away team win.
Rules for classification: 1) Points, 2) Playoff game, in case two teams are tied in points for first place.
If there are more than two teams tied in points: 2) Goal difference, 3) Goals for, 4) Head-to-head record, 5) Drawing of lots, 6) Playoff game in case two teams are tied in points for first place

=== Torneo Intermedio Final ===
16 July 2017
16:00

Defensor Sporting	0–1	Nacional
	Report	Aguirre 67'

Estadio Centenario, Montevideo
Referee: Leodán González

=== Top goalscorers ===
Rank	Name	Club	Goals
1	(Uruguay) Rodrigo Aguirre	Nacional	6
2	(Uruguay) Gonzalo Carneiro	Defensor Sporting	5
2	(Uruguay) Fabián Estoyanoff	Fénix	5
4	(Uruguay) Sebastián Fernández	Nacional	4
4	(Uruguay) Cristian Palacios	Montevideo Wanderers	4
4	(Uruguay) Juan Ignacio Ramírez	Liverpool	4

Source: Soccerway

== Torneo Clausura ==
=== Standings ===
Pos	Team	Pld	W	D	L	GF	GA	GD	Pts	Qualification
1	Peñarol	15	14	0	1	39	7	+32	42	Qualification to Championship playoff
2	Defensor Sporting	15	10	3	2	27	17	+10	33	
3	Nacional	15	9	2	4	29	15	+14	29	
4	River Plate	15	6	6	3	23	16	+7	24	
5	Sud América	15	6	4	5	26	24	+2	22	
6	Danubio	15	5	5	5	18	24	−6	20	
7	Cerro	15	6	2	7	17	24	−7	20	
8	Boston River	15	5	4	6	13	15	−2	19	
9	Rampla Juniors	15	4	6	5	15	19	−4	18	
10	Fénix	15	4	5	6	17	17	0	17	
11	Liverpool	15	5	2	8	23	25	−2	17	
12	Racing	15	4	5	6	18	22	−4	17	
13	Montevideo Wanderers	15	4	4	7	21	26	−5	16	
14	El Tanque Sisley	15	3	7	5	15	22	−7	16	
15	Juventud	15	3	2	10	14	28	−14	11	
16	Plaza Colonia	15	2	3	10	12	26	−14	9	

Source: AUF, Soccerway
Rules for classification: 1) Points, 2) Playoff game, in case two teams are tied in points for first place.
If there are more than two teams tied in points: 2) Goal difference, 3) Goals for, 4) Head-to-head record, 5) Drawing of lots, 6) Playoff game in case two teams are tied in points for first place

=== Results ===
Home \ Away	BOR	CRR	DAN	DFS	ETS	FNX	JUV	LIV	WAN	NAC	PEÑ	PCO	RAC	RAJ	RIV	SUD
Boston River	—	1–0	—	0–1	1–0	0–0	3–1	—	1–1	—	0–1	3–0	—	—	—	—
Cerro	—	—	1–2	0–3	—	—	3–2	—	—	—	0–4	1–0	—	—	2–2	2–1
Danubio	1–0	—	—	—	2–2	—	—	—	—	1–1	0–2	2–2	—	1–1	—	1–0
Defensor Sporting	—	—	1–0	—	—	0–2	—	2–2	2–1	—	—	—	4–2	—	2–1	3–2
El Tanque Sisley	—	2–1	—	0–2	—	1–1	2–2	0–3	1–1	—	0–4	1–1	—	—	—	—
Fénix	—	1–1	0–1	—	—	—	—	0–2	4–1	—	—	—	1–2	1–1	0–0	2–3
Juventud	—	—	2–1	0–1	—	0–2	—	2–1	2–5	—	—	—	0–2	—	1–0	—
Liverpool	1–2	1–0	5–0	—	—	—	—	—	—	1–4	—	—	1–1	1–2	0–4	2–4
Montevideo Wanderers	—	2–3	1–3	—	—	—	—	2–1	—	2–3	—	—	1–1	1–0	2–2	1–0
Nacional	5–0	3–1	—	1–1	1–2	1–0	3–0	—	—	—	0–2	1–0	—	—	—	—
Peñarol	—	—	—	3–1	—	3–0	1–0	2–1	2–0	—	—	3–0	4–0	—	—	—
Plaza Colonia	—	—	—	1–2	—	1–3	1–0	0–1	1–0	—	—	—	1–2	—	2–3	—
Racing	1–1	0–1	5–2	—	0–2	—	—	—	—	0–1	—	—	—	0–0	0–0	2–3
Rampla Juniors	1–0	0–1	—	2–2	1–1	—	2–1	—	—	0–2	1–4	2–0	—	—	—	—
River Plate	1–1	—	1–1	—	1–0	—	—	—	—	2–1	2–1	—	—	3–1	—	1–2
Sud América	1–0	—	—	—	1–1	—	1–1	—	—	3–2	2–3	2–2	—	1–1	—	—

Source: AUF, Soccerway
Legend: Blue = home team win; Yellow = draw; Red = away team win.

=== Top goalscorers ===
Rank	Name	Club	Goals
1	(Uruguay) Maureen Franco	Cerro	10
1	(Uruguay) Cristian Palacios	Peñarol	10
3	(Uruguay) Rubén Bentancourt	Sud América	9
4	(Uruguay) Sebastián Fernández	Nacional	8
4	(Uruguay) Renzo López	Plaza Colonia	8
4	(Uruguay) Cristian Rodríguez	Peñarol	8
4	(Uruguay) David Terans	Danubio	8
8	(Uruguay) Gonzalo Malán	Juventud	7
8	(Argentina) Maxi Rodríguez	Peñarol	7
10	(Uruguay) Liber Quiñones	Racing	6
10	(Uruguay) Alex Silva	Rampla Juniors	6

Source: Soccerway

== Aggregate table ==
Pos	Team	Pld	W	D	L	GF	GA	GD	Pts	Qualification
1	Peñarol (C)	37	26	8	3	85	26	+59	86	Qualification to Championship playoff and Copa Libertadores group stage
2	Defensor Sporting	37	26	8	3	67	37	+30	86	Qualification to Championship playoff and Copa Libertadores group stage
3	Nacional	37	26	5	6	71	35	+36	83	Qualification to Copa Libertadores second stage
4	Montevideo Wanderers	37	16	7	14	56	53	+3	55	Qualification to Copa Libertadores first stage
5	Cerro	37	15	8	14	50	50	0	53	Qualification to Copa Sudamericana first stage (Note: Since the Torneo Intermedio winners, Nacional, qualified for South American competition based on their aggregate table position, the spot awarded to the Torneo Intermedio winner (Copa Sudamericana first stage) was passed to the next best-placed team, in this case to the eighth-placed team.)
6	Boston River	37	15	7	15	43	39	+4	52	Qualification to Copa Sudamericana first stage
7	Rampla Juniors	37	13	11	13	42	50	−8	50	Qualification to Copa Sudamericana first stage
8	Danubio (Note: Danubio were awarded two points and Sud América were deducted one point due to a breach of rules by Sud América manager Damián Timpani during the Torneo Intermedio match between both teams.)	37	10	14	13	40	49	−9	46	Qualification to Copa Sudamericana first stage
9	River Plate	37	10	15	12	42	44	−2	45	
10	Racing	37	12	9	16	42	51	−9	45	
11	Fénix	37	10	12	15	46	47	−1	42	
12	Liverpool	37	9	10	18	44	58	−14	37	
13	El Tanque Sisley	37	9	10	18	41	64	−23	37	
14	Sud América	37	9	9	19	50	69	−19	35	
15	Juventud	37	7	10	20	38	59	−21	31	
16	Plaza Colonia	37	6	11	20	32	57	−25	29	

Source: AUF
Rules for classification: 1) Points, 2) Playoff game, in case two teams are tied in points for first place.
If there are more than two teams tied in points: 2) Goal difference, 3) Goals for, 4) Head-to-head record, 5) Drawing of lots, 6) Playoff game in case two teams are tied in points for first place
(C) Champions

=== Aggregate table playoff ===
Since Peñarol and Defensor Sporting ended the season tied in points, a playoff was played to determine the aggregate table first-placed team. The winners qualified for the Championship playoff finals.

6 December 2017
20:00

Defensor Sporting	0–1	Peñarol
	Report	C. Rodríguez 90+3'

Estadio Centenario, Montevideo
Referee: Esteban Ostojich

== Championship playoff ==
Semi-final		Finals
		Peñarol (Semi-final winners)	—	—	—
Peñarol (Clausura winners) (p)	0 (4)	Peñarol (Aggregate table first place)	—	—	—
Defensor Sporting (Apertura winners)	0 (2)

=== Semi-final ===
10 December 2017
19:00

Peñarol	0–0 (a.e.t.)	Defensor Sporting
	Report
Penalties
C. Rodríguez (penalty scored); Gargano (penalty scored); Arias (penalty scored); Viatri (penalty scored)	4–2	(penalty scored) Cabrera; (penalty missed) Piquerez; (penalty scored) Cardaccio; (penalty missed) Acuña

Estadio Centenario, Montevideo
Referee: Daniel Fedorczuk

Peñarol won 4–2 on penalties.

Peñarol	Defensor Sporting

PEÑAROL:
GK	12	(Uruguay) Kevin Dawson
RB	6	(Uruguay) Guillermo Varela
CB	2	(Uruguay) Fabricio Formiliano	(substituted off) 75'
CB	21	(Uruguay) Ramón Arias	(yellow card) 109'
LB	27	(Uruguay) Lucas Hernández
CM	23	(Uruguay) Walter Gargano	(yellow card) 68'
CM	7	(Uruguay) Cristian Rodríguez	(yellow card) 77'
RM	9	(Uruguay) Diego Rossi
LM	16	(Uruguay) Fabián Estoyanoff	(substituted off) 67'
AM	11	(Argentina) Maximiliano Rodríguez	(substituted off) 60'
FW	28	(Argentina) Lucas Viatri
Substitutes:
GK	1	(Uruguay) Gastón Guruceaga
DF	3	(Uruguay) Yefferson Quintana	(substituted on) 75'
DF	18	(Uruguay) Mathías Corujo
MF	5	(Uruguay) Marcel Novick
MF	14	(Uruguay) Guzmán Pereira
FW	10	(Uruguay) Gastón Rodríguez	(substituted on) 67'	(yellow card) 99'
FW	30	(Uruguay) Cristian Palacios	(substituted on) 60'
Manager:
(Uruguay) Leonardo Ramos

DEFENSOR SPORTING:
GK	1	(Uruguay) Matías Gastón Rodríguez
CB	24	(Uruguay) Gonzalo Maulella
CB	26	(Uruguay) Nicolás Correa
CB	6	(Uruguay) Andrés Lamas
RM	22	(Uruguay) Mathías Suárez
CM	20	(Uruguay) Carlos Benavídez	(substituted off) 6'
CM	23	(Uruguay) Mathías Cardaccio	(yellow card) 97'
LM	28	(Uruguay) Joaquín Piquerez
AM	8	(Uruguay) Matías Cabrera	(yellow card) 77'
FW	7	(Uruguay) Facundo Castro	(substituted off) 82'
FW	29	(Panama) Cecilio Waterman	(yellow card) 45'	(substituted off) 115'
Substitutes:
GK	12	(Uruguay) Agustín López
DF	18	(Uruguay) Santiago Carrera
DF	14	(Uruguay) Emanuel Beltrán
MF	5	(Uruguay) Martín Rabuñal	(substituted on) 6'	(yellow card) 117'
MF	16	(Uruguay) Facundo Milán
FW	19	(Uruguay) Héctor Acuña	(substituted on) 115'
FW	30	(Uruguay) Pablo López	(substituted on) 82'
Manager:
(Uruguay) Eduardo Acevedo

=== Final ===
Since Peñarol, who had the best record in the aggregate table, won the semifinal, they became champions automatically and the final was not played. Defensor Sporting became runners-up as the second-placed team in the aggregate table. Both teams qualified for the 2018 Copa Libertadores group stage.

Primera División
2017 Champions
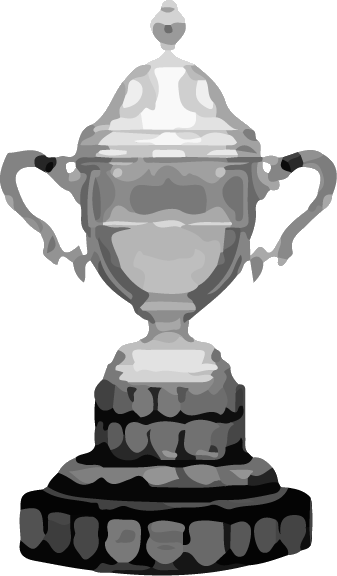

49th title

== Top goalscorers ==
Rank	Name	Club	Goals
1	(Uruguay) Cristian Palacios	Montevideo Wanderers / Peñarol	29
2	(Uruguay) Maureen Franco	Cerro	25
3	(Uruguay) Fabián Estoyanoff	Fénix / Peñarol	15
3	(Uruguay) Cristian Rodríguez	Peñarol	15
5	(Uruguay) Sebastián Fernández	Nacional	14
6	(Uruguay) Rodrigo Aguirre	Nacional	13
7	(Uruguay) Juan Ignacio Ramírez	Liverpool	12

Source: Tenfield

== Relegation ==
Relegation is determined at the end of the season by computing an average of the number of points earned per game over the four most recent tournaments: 2016 Transición and this season's three tournaments (Apertura, Intermedio, and Clausura). The three teams with the lowest average were relegated to the Segunda División for the following season.

Pos	Team	2016 Pts	2017 Pts	Total Pts	Total Pld	Avg	Relegation
1	Nacional	34	83	117	52	2.25	
2	Defensor Sporting	25	86	111	52	2.135	
3	Peñarol	15	86	101	52	1.942	
4	Montevideo Wanderers	29	55	84	52	1.615	
5	Cerro	22	53	75	52	1.442	
6	Danubio	29	46	75	52	1.442	
7	Boston River	22	52	74	52	1.423	
8	Rampla Juniors	17	50	67	52	1.288	
9	Racing	20	45	65	52	1.25	
10	River Plate	18	45	63	52	1.212	
11	Fénix	19	42	61	52	1.173	
12	Liverpool	24	37	61	52	1.173	
13	El Tanque Sisley (O)	—	37	37	37	1	Qualification to Relegation playoff
14	Sud América (R)	17	35	52	52	1	Qualification to Relegation playoff
15	Juventud (R)	17	31	48	52	0.923	Relegation to Segunda División
16	Plaza Colonia (R)	12	29	41	52	0.788	Relegation to Segunda División

=== Relegation playoff ===
Since El Tanque Sisley and Sud América ended with the same average, a playoff (by points) between both teams was played to determine the third relegated team. If both teams were tied in points after the second leg, an extra match would be played. The loser was relegated to the Segunda División.

Teams			Scores		
Team 1	Points	Team 2	1st leg	2nd leg	Tiebreaker match
El Tanque Sisley	3:3	Sud América	3–2	0–1	1–1 (4–2 p)
