= 2015–16 Campeonato Uruguayo Primera División =

112th season of the top-tier football league in Uruguay

Liga Profesional de Primera División
- Season: 2015–16
- Champions: Peñarol (48th title)

The 2015–16 Liga Profesional de Primera División season, also known as the 2015–16 Copa Uruguaya or the 2015–16 Campeonato Uruguayo, was the 112th season of Uruguay's top-flight football league, and the 85th in which it was professional. Nacional was the defending champion.

== Attendances ==
The teams with an average home attendance above 10,000 were Club Nacional de Football with 15,065 and Peñarol with 14,172.

== Teams ==
Locations of the 2015–16 season teams outside Montevideo.
Locations of the 2015−16 Primera División teams within Montevideo.

Club	City	Stadium	Capacity
Cerro	Montevideo	Luis Tróccoli	24,000
Danubio	Montevideo	Jardines Del Hipódromo	14,401
Defensor Sporting	Montevideo	Luis Franzini	18,000
El Tanque Sisley	Florida	Campeones Olímpicos	7,000
Fénix	Montevideo	Parque Capurro	5,500
Juventud	Las Piedras	Parque Artigas	5,500
Liverpool	Montevideo	Belvedere	10,000
Montevideo Wanderers	Montevideo	Parque Alfredo Víctor Viera	7,420
Nacional	Montevideo	Gran Parque Central	23,500
Peñarol	Montevideo	Campeón del Siglo	40,000
Plaza Colonia	Colonia	Suppici	12,000
Racing	Montevideo	Osvaldo Roberto	4,500
Rentistas	Montevideo	Complejo Rentistas	10,600
River Plate	Montevideo	Parque Federico Omar Saroldi	5,624
Sud América	San José	Casto Martínez Laguarda	6,000
Villa Teresa	Montevideo	José Nasazzi	5,000

== Torneo Apertura ==
=== Standings ===
Pos	Team	Pld	W	D	L	GF	GA	GD	Pts	Qualification
1	Peñarol	15	9	4	2	28	17	+11	31	Championship Playoffs
2	Nacional	15	9	3	3	32	21	+11	30	
3	Cerro	15	9	1	5	25	19	+6	28	
4	Montevideo Wanderers	15	6	6	3	22	16	+6	24	
5	River Plate	15	7	2	6	31	25	+6	23	
6	Fénix	15	6	5	4	17	12	+5	23	
7	Danubio	15	6	4	5	21	13	+8	22	
8	Defensor Sporting	15	6	3	6	25	25	0	21	
9	El Tanque Sisley	15	5	4	6	17	17	0	19	
10	Rentistas	15	5	3	7	18	19	−1	18	
11	Sud América	15	4	6	5	17	22	−5	18	
12	Liverpool	15	5	3	7	15	24	−9	18	
13	Plaza Colonia	15	3	8	4	15	16	−1	17	
14	Racing	15	4	5	6	21	26	−5	17	
15	Juventud	15	4	3	8	14	25	−11	15	
16	Villa Teresa	15	1	2	12	9	30	−21	5	

== Torneo Clausura ==
=== Standings ===
Pos	Team	Pld	W	D	L	GF	GA	GD	Pts	Qualification
1	Plaza Colonia	15	9	5	1	20	9	+11	32	Championship Playoffs
2	Peñarol	15	8	3	4	25	18	+7	27	
3	Sud América	15	7	4	4	17	16	+1	25	
4	Montevideo Wanderers	15	7	3	5	31	21	+10	24	
5	Nacional	15	7	3	5	21	17	+4	24	
6	Cerro	15	7	3	5	17	15	+2	24	
7	Fénix	15	6	5	4	18	13	+5	23	
8	Liverpool	15	7	1	7	16	18	−2	22	
9	Rentistas	15	6	3	6	18	17	+1	21	
10	Defensor Sporting	15	6	3	6	23	29	−6	21	
11	Villa Teresa	15	5	4	6	15	19	−4	19	
12	Juventud	15	4	6	5	19	19	0	18	
13	River Plate	15	5	3	7	15	16	−1	18	
14	Racing	15	3	5	7	19	24	−5	14	
15	Danubio	15	3	4	8	18	25	−7	13	
16	El Tanque Sisley	15	2	1	12	14	30	−16	7	

== Aggregate table ==
Pos	Team	Pld	W	D	L	GF	GA	GD	Pts	Qualification
1	Peñarol	30	17	7	6	53	35	+18	58	2017 Copa Libertadores Second Stage and 2016 Copa Sudamericana First Stage
2	Nacional	30	16	6	8	53	38	+15	54	2017 Copa Libertadores Second Stage
3	Cerro	30	16	4	10	42	34	+8	51 (Note: Cerro had 1 point deducted)	2017 Copa Libertadores First Stage
4	Plaza Colonia	30	12	13	5	35	25	+10	49	2016 Copa Sudamericana First Stage
5	Montevideo Wanderers	30	13	9	8	53	37	+16	48	2016 Copa Sudamericana First Stage
6	Fénix	30	12	10	8	35	25	+10	46	2016 Copa Sudamericana First Stage
7	Sud América	30	11	10	9	34	38	−4	43	
8	Defensor Sporting	30	12	6	12	48	54	−6	42	
9	River Plate	30	12	5	13	46	41	+5	41	
10	Liverpool	30	12	4	14	31	42	−11	40	
11	Rentistas	30	11	6	13	36	36	0	39	
12	Danubio	30	9	8	13	39	38	+1	35	
13	Juventud	30	8	9	13	33	44	−11	33	
14	Racing	30	7	10	13	40	50	−10	31	
15	El Tanque Sisley	30	7	5	18	31	47	−16	26	
16	Villa Teresa	30	6	6	18	24	49	−25	24	

== Relegation ==
Pos	Team	2014–15 Pts	2015–16 Pts	Total Pts	Total Pld	Relegation
1	Nacional	63	54	117	60	
2	Peñarol	56	58	114	60	
3	Plaza Colonia	-	49	98	30	
4	River Plate	54	41	95	60	
5	Defensor Sporting	48	42	90	60	
6	Cerro	34	51	85	60	
7	Sud América	42	43	85	60	
8	Danubio	49	35	84	60	
9	Fénix	37	46	83	60	
10	Montevideo Wanderers	34	48	82	60	
11	Liverpool	-	40	80	30	
12	Juventud	45	33	78	60	
13	Racing	45	31	76	60	
14	Rentistas	34	39	73	60	Relegation to Segunda División
15	El Tanque Sisley	39	26	65	60	Relegation to Segunda División
16	Villa Teresa	-	24	48	30	Relegation to Segunda División

== Championship playoff ==
=== Semifinal ===
June 12, 2016
16:00 (UTC-3)

Peñarol	3–1 (a.e.t.)	Plaza Colonia
D. Rossi 79'; M. Olivera 109'; M. Affonso 112'		A. Furia 69'

Estadio Centenario, Montevideo, Uruguay

Peñarol	Plaza Colonia

PEÑAROL:
GK	1	(Uruguay) Gastón Guruceaga
RB	13	(Uruguay) Matías Aguirregaray	(yellow card) 119'
CB	23	(Uruguay) Carlos Valdez	(yellow card) 28'
CB	2	(Uruguay) Guillermo Rodríguez	(yellow card) 54'
LB	15	(Uruguay) Maximiliano Olivera	(yellow card) 62'
CM	5	(Uruguay) Marcel Novick		(substituted off) 83'
CM	25	(Uruguay) Nahitan Nández	(yellow card) 30'	(substituted off) 73'
RM	16	(Uruguay) Federico Valverde
LM	10	(Uruguay) Diego Forlán
FW	29	(Colombia) Miguel Murillo
FW	9	(Uruguay) Diego Ifrán		(substituted off) 62'
Substitutes:
GK	12	(Uruguay) Damián Frascarelli
DF	3	(Uruguay) Fabrizio Buschiazzo
MF	14	(Uruguay) Luis Aguiar
MF	20	(Uruguay) Nicolás Albarracín
MF	28	(Argentina) Tomás Costa		(substituted in) 83'
FW	27	(Uruguay) Diego Rossi		(substituted in) 62'
FW	26	(Uruguay) Mauricio Affonso		(substituted in) 73'
Manager:
(Uruguay) Jorge da Silva

PLAZA COLONIA:
GK	1	(Uruguay) Kevin Dawson
RB	13	(Uruguay) Santiago de Ávila
CB	2	(Uruguay) Germán Ferreira	(yellow card) 46' (red card) 106'
CB	3	(Uruguay) Carlos Rodríguez Rodríguez
LB	14	(Uruguay) Alejandro Villoldo	(yellow card) 116'
RM	10	(Uruguay) Nicolás Milesi	(yellow card) 7'
CM	7	(Uruguay) Alejandro Furia
CM	5	(Uruguay) Matías Caseras
LM	15	(Uruguay) Facundo Waller		(substituted off) 68'
FW	11	(Uruguay) Nicolás Dibble Aristimuño	(yellow card) 62'	(substituted off) 105'
FW	38	(Argentina) Germán Rivero		(substituted off) 98'
Substitutes:
GK		(Uruguay) Nicolás Guirin
DF	16	(Uruguay) Nicolás Rodríguez
DF	17	(Uruguay) Alejandro Rodríguez Morales
MF	18	(Uruguay) Mariano Bogliacino		(substituted in) 68'
MF	20	(Uruguay) Ezequias Redín
FW	9	(Uruguay) Sergio Leal		(substituted in) 98'
FW	27	(Uruguay) Federico Puppo		(substituted in) 105'
Manager:
(Uruguay) Eduardo Espinel

=== Final ===
Since Peñarol, who has the best record in the aggregate table, won the semifinal, they became champions automatically, and the final was not played. Nacional became runners-up as the second-placed team in the aggregate table.

Primera División
2015–16 champion
Peñarol
43rd title
