= 2022 Supercopa Uruguaya =

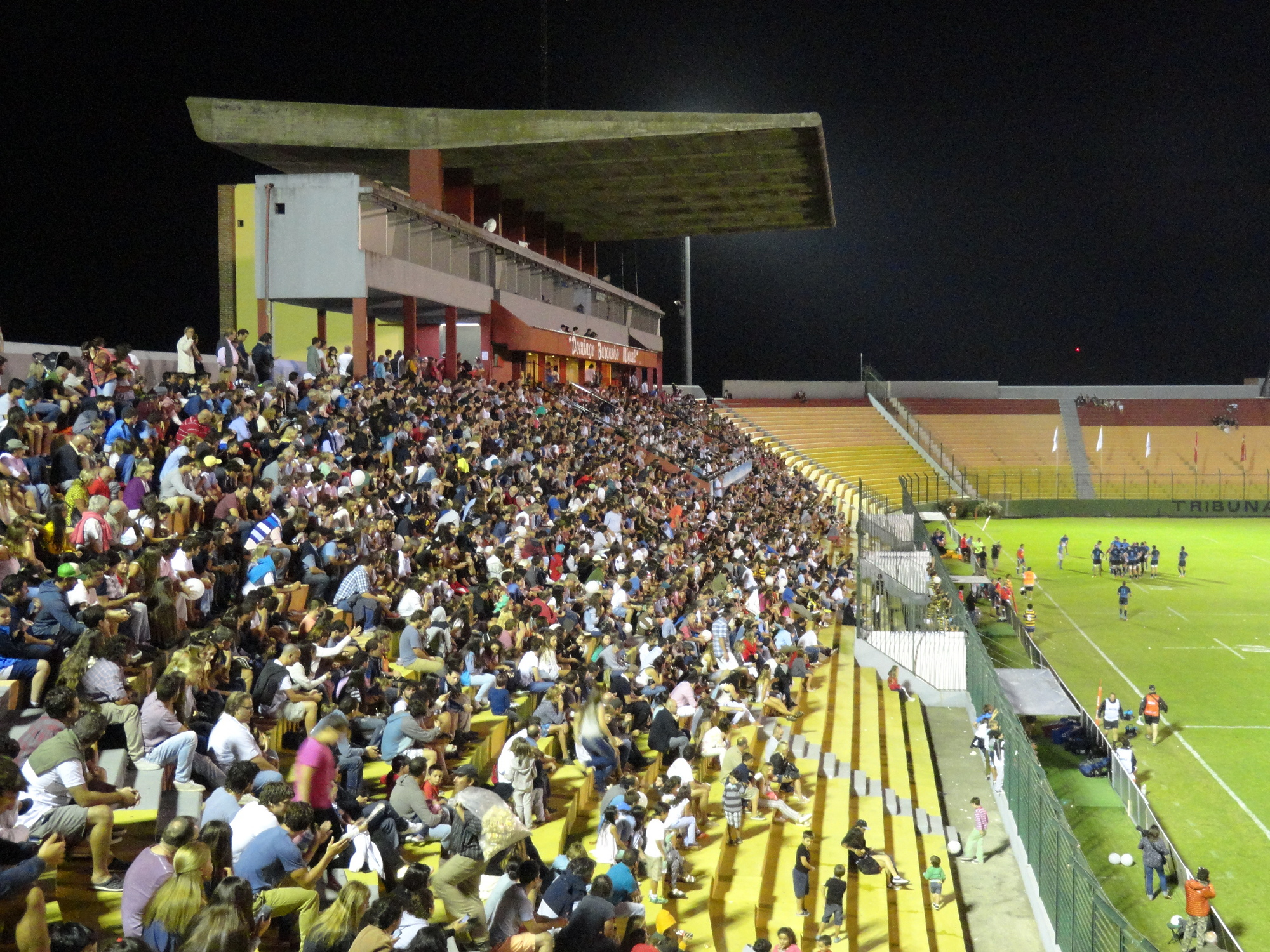
- Estadio Domingo Burgueño was the venue for the match.
Plaza Colonia	Peñarol
0	1
- After extra time
- Date: 30 January 2022
- Venue: Estadio Domingo Burgueño, Maldonado
- Referee: Andrés Matonte

The 2022 Supercopa Uruguaya was the fifth edition of the Supercopa Uruguaya, Uruguay's football super cup. It was held on 30 January 2022 between the 2021 Primera División champions Peñarol and the 2021 Torneo Apertura champions Plaza Colonia.

Originally the match was scheduled to be played at Estadio Silvestre Octavio Landoni in Durazno, however, the Durazno Intendancy declined to host it due to an increase of COVID-19 cases in the Durazno Department. On 21 January 2022, the Uruguayan Football Association (AUF) announced that the match was moved to Estadio Domingo Burgueño in Maldonado.

Peñarol defeated Plaza Colonia by a 1–0 score after extra time to win their second Supercopa Uruguaya title.

== Teams ==
The Supercopa Uruguaya is usually contested by the champions of the Primera División and the Torneo Intermedio winners of the previous year, however, since the Torneo Intermedio was not held in 2021 due to the COVID-19 pandemic, on 21 December 2021 the League Council of the AUF voted that Plaza Colonia, as winners of the 2021 Torneo Apertura, would play the Supercopa against Peñarol.

Nacional, as the team that placed second in the aggregate table of the 2021 Primera División season, was offered to take part in the Supercopa but they declined the nomination.

Team	Qualification	Previous appearances (bold indicates winners)
Peñarol	2021 Primera División champions	2 (**2018**, 2019)
Plaza Colonia	2021 Apertura winners	None

== Details ==
30 January 2022
19:00 UTC−3

Plaza Colonia	0–1 (a.e.t.)	Peñarol
	Report	Ayala 120+3' (o.g.)

Estadio Domingo Burgueño, Maldonado
Referee: Andrés Matonte

**Plaza Colonia**	**Peñarol**

GK	12	(Uruguay) Nicolás Guirín
RB	28	(Uruguay) Federico Barrandeguy	(substituted off) 116'
CB	2	(Argentina) Agustín Heredia
CB	26	(Brazil) Vitão	(yellow card) 6'
LB	14	(Uruguay) Facundo Kidd	(yellow card) 18'	(substituted off) 46'
CM	29	(Uruguay) Nicolás Ayala	(yellow card) 41'
CM	3	(Uruguay) Yvo Calleros
RM	15	(Uruguay) Álvaro Fernández	(yellow card) 67'	(substituted off) 101'
LM	5	(Uruguay) Agustín Pérez
CF	11	(Uruguay) Nicolás Dibble	(substituted off) 101'
CF	9	(Uruguay) Juan Cruz Mascia	(substituted off) 101'
Substitutes:
GK	1	(Uruguay) Andrés Samurio
DF	19	(Uruguay) Edhand Greising	(substituted in) 46'
MF	20	(Uruguay) Ezequias Redín	(substituted in) 116'
MF	7	(Uruguay) Cristian Rodríguez	(substituted in) 101'
MF	18	(Brazil) Daniel Bahia	(substituted in) 101'
MF	32	(Uruguay) Esteban Rodríguez
FW	10	(Uruguay) Leandro Suhr	(substituted in) 101'
Manager:
(Uruguay) Eduardo Espinel

GK	12	(Uruguay) Kevin Dawson
RB	13	(Uruguay) Matías Aguirregaray	(substituted off) 96'
CB	21	(Uruguay) Ramón Arias
CB	2	(Uruguay) Edgar Elizalde
LB	22	(Uruguay) Juan Ramos
RM	25	(Uruguay) Ignacio Laquintana	(substituted off) 96'
CM	6	(Uruguay) Rodrigo Saravia
CM	23	(Uruguay) Walter Gargano	(substituted off) 102'
LM	10	(Uruguay) Alejo Cruz	(substituted off) 66'
AM	8	(Uruguay) Pablo Ceppelini
CF	9	(Uruguay) Agustín Álvarez Martínez
Substitutes:
GK	32	(Uruguay) Jonathan Lima
DF	24	(Uruguay) Pablo López
MF	18	(Uruguay) Agustín Álvarez Wallace	(substituted in) 96'
MF	34	(Uruguay) Kevin Lewis
MF	20	(Uruguay) Bryan Olivera	(substituted in) 102'
FW	29	(Uruguay) Máximo Alonso	(substituted in) 96'
FW	47	(Uruguay) Cristian Olivera	(substituted in) 66'
Manager:
(Uruguay) Mauricio Larriera

Assistant referees:
Andrés Nievas
Sebastián Schröeder
Fourth official:
Jonhatan Fuentes
Video assistant referee:
Leodán González
Assistant video assistant referee:
Diego Riveiro

**Match rules**

- 90 minutes.
- 30 minutes of extra time if necessary.
- Penalty shoot-out if scores still level.
- Seven named substitutes.
- Maximum of five substitutions.
