= Guillermo Reyes =

Guillermo Reyes may refer to:

- Guillermo Reyes (footballer) (b. 1986)
- Guillermo Reyes González (b. 1965), a Colombian lawyer, writer and academic
