= Joan Gamboa =

Uruguayan footballer (born 1997)

Personal information
- Full name: Joan Manuel Gamboa Bermúdez
- Date of birth: 28 March 1997 (age 29)
- Place of birth: Montevideo, Uruguay
- Height: 1.71 m (5 ft 7 in)
- Position: Right-back

Youth career
- 2009–2017: Rampla Juniors

Senior career*
Years	Team	Apps	(Gls)
2017–2019	Rampla Juniors	5	(0)
2020	Uruguay Montevideo	2	(0)
- * Club domestic league appearances and goals as of 18:44, 13 July 2021 (UTC)

Joan Manuel Gamboa Bermúdez (born 28 March 1997) is a Uruguayan footballer who plays as a right back.

== Career ==
=== Rampla Juniors ===
A graduate of the club's youth academy, Gamboa made his professional debut on 8 July 2017, coming on as an 83rd-minute substitute for Ignacio Panzariello in a 1–0 victory over Liverpool Montevideo. After three years and five first team appearances, Gamboa departed the club at the end of the 2019 season.
