= Stadium Parque Carlos Ángel Fossa =

Football stadium in Montevideo, Uruguay

- Estadio Parque Carlos Ángel Fossa
- El Fortín, Parque Fossa
- Interactive map of Stadium Parque Carlos Ángel Fossa
- Address: Montevideo; Uruguay
- Location: Dr. Héctor Luis Odriozola 3820, Montevideo, Uruguay
- Coordinates: 34.8607°S 56.1621°W
- Owner: Institución Atlética Sud América
- Capacity: 2,466 spectators
- Surface: Natural grass

Construction
- Opened: 1935

The Stadium Parque Carlos Ángel Fossa (Estadio Parque Carlos Ángel Fossa) is a football stadium located in Montevideo, Uruguay. It is owned by the Institución Atlética Sud América, a football club based in the city. The stadium is also known by the names El Fortín and Parque Fossa.

The stadium is situated behind the Cuartel de Blandengues in the Cerrito de la Victoria area, at the end of Héctor Odriozola Street. It has a seating capacity of 2,466 spectators. The stadium was inaugurated in 1935 and is named in honor of Carlos Ángel Fossa, one of the club's former presidents.

Estadio Parque Carlos Ángel Fossa is used primarily for football matches, and it serves as the home ground for the Institución Atlética Sud América. The stadium holds historical significance for the club, and it remains an important venue in Montevideo's football culture.
