= Ignacio Laquintana =

Uruguayan footballer (born 1999)

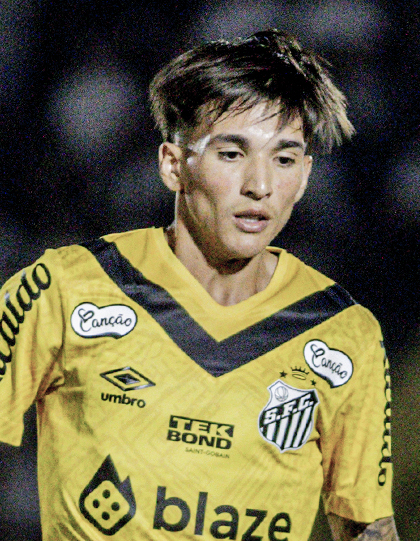
- Laquintana playing for Santos in 2024

Personal information
- Full name: Ignacio Jesús Laquintana Marsico
- Date of birth: 1 February 1999 (age 27)
- Place of birth: Paysandú, Uruguay
- Height: 1.73 m (5 ft 8 in)
- Position: Attacking midfielder

Team information
- Current team: Red Bull Bragantino

Youth career
- Juventud Unida de Paysandú
- Defensor Sporting

Senior career*
Years	Team	Apps	(Gls)
2018–2021	Defensor Sporting	64	(8)
2021–2023	Peñarol	59	(8)
2023–	Red Bull Bragantino	50	(6)
2024	→ Santos (loan)	11	(0)
2026	→ Huesca (loan)	7	(0)

International career^{‡}
2018	Uruguay U20	14	(2)
2025–	Uruguay	2	(1)
- * Club domestic league appearances and goals as of 9 June 2026 ‡ National team caps and goals as of 13 October 2025

Ignacio Jesús Laquintana Marsico (born 1 February 1999) is a Uruguayan professional footballer who plays as an attacking midfielder for Brazilian club Red Bull Bragantino and the Uruguay national team.

== Early life and career ==
Born in Paysandú, Laquintana played for the youth side of their hometown club CA Juventud Unida before joining Defensor Sporting. At the latter's youth sides, he underwent two heart surgeries after having heart problems detected in examinations.

== Club career ==
=== Defensor Sporting ===
Laquintana made his professional debut with Defensor on 8 September 2018, coming on as a second-half substitute for Matías Santos and scoring the equalizer in a 1–1 draw against Cerro. He finished his first year with two goals in five appearances.

In the following two seasons, Laquintana was regularly used for Defensor, and played in the 2019 Copa Libertadores with the club. On 16 April 2021, he agreed to a deal with Peñarol, but the move fell through.

=== Peñarol ===
On 24 August 2021, Laquintana signed a contract with Peñarol. He won the 2021 Primera División and the 2022 Supercopa Uruguaya with the club, scoring five goals in the 2022 season.

=== Bragantino ===
On 4 April 2023, Laquintana moved abroad and signed a five-year contract with Red Bull Bragantino of the Campeonato Brasileiro Série A. He broke his ankle on his second match for the club, spending three months sidelined and only playing another match in September.

Laquintana was only featured in four matches for Braga during the 2023 season before starting to feature more regularly in the following year. He scored his first goal abroad on 17 February 2024, netting a last-minute equalizer in a 2–2 Campeonato Paulista away draw against São Paulo.

==== Loan to Santos ====
On 2 September 2024, Laquintana was loaned to Campeonato Brasileiro Série B side Santos until the end of the year. He made his debut for the club five days later, starting in a 1–0 away win over Brusque.

== International career ==
Laquintana represented Uruguay at under-20 level in friendlies in 2018. On 18 March 2024, he was called up to the senior team by manager Marcelo Bielsa for two friendlies against Basque Country and Ivory Coast. He made his debut for Uruguay on 10 October 2025 and scored the only goal in the 1–0 victory against the Dominican Republic in Malaysia.

== Career statistics ==
=== Club ===
As of 26 November 2024

Appearances and goals by club, season and competition
Club	Season	League			National cup (Note: Includes Copa do Brasil)		Continental		State league (Note: Includes Campeonato Paulista)		Other		Total	
Club	Season	Division	Apps	Goals	Apps	Goals	Apps	Goals	Apps	Goals	Apps	Goals	Apps	Goals
Defensor Sporting	2018	Primera División	5	2	—		0	0	—		—		5	2
Defensor Sporting	2019	Primera División	31	4	—		5 (Note: Appearance(s) in Copa Libertadores)	1	—		—		36	5
Defensor Sporting	2020	Primera División	28	2	—		—		—		—		28	2
Defensor Sporting	Total		64	8	—		5	1	—		—		69	9
Peñarol	2021	Primera División	15	2	—		2 (Note: Appearance(s) in Copa Sudamericana)	0	—		—		17	2
Peñarol	2022	Primera División	35	5	—		6	0	—		1 (Note: Appearance(s) in Supercopa Uruguaya)	0	42	5
Peñarol	2023	Primera División	9	1	—		1	0	—		—		10	1
Peñarol	Total		59	8	—		9	0	—		1	0	69	8
Red Bull Bragantino	2023	Série A	4	0	—		—		—		1 (Note: Appearance(s) in Copa Paulista)	0	5	0
Red Bull Bragantino	2024	Série A	9	1	1	0	9 (Note: Four appearances in Copa Libetadores, five appearances in Copa Sudamericana)	0	8	1	—		27	2
Red Bull Bragantino	Total		13	1	1	0	9	0	8	1	1	0	32	2
Santos (loan)	2024	Série B	11	0	—		—		—		—		11	0
Career total			147	17	1	0	23	1	8	1	2	0	181	19

=== International ===
As of match played 13 October 2025

Appearances and goals by national team and year
National team	Year	Apps	Goals
Uruguay	2025	2	1
Total		2	1

Scores and results list Uruguay's goal tally first, score column indicates score after each Laquintana goal.

List of international goals scored by Ignacio Laquintana
No.	Date	Venue	Opponent	Score	Result	Competition
1	10 October 2025	Bukit Jalil National Stadium, Kuala Lumpur, Malaysia	Dominican Republic	1–0	1–0	Friendly

== Honours ==
Peñarol

- Uruguayan Primera División: 2021
- Supercopa Uruguaya: 2022

Santos

- Campeonato Brasileiro Série B: 2024
