= Ezequias Redín =

Uruguayan football player (born 1995)

Personal information
- Full name: Ezequias Emanuel Redín Morales
- Date of birth: 11 May 1995 (age 31)
- Place of birth: Colonia del Sacramento, Uruguay
- Height: 1.82 m (6 ft 0 in)
- Positions: Midfielder; right-back

Team information
- Current team: Plaza Colonia
- Number: 20

Youth career
- Plaza Colonia

Senior career*
Years	Team	Apps	(Gls)
2013–	Plaza Colonia	300	(11)
- * Club domestic league appearances and goals as of 14 September 2025

Ezequias Emanuel Redín Morales (born 11 May 1995) is a Uruguayan professional footballer who plays as a midfielder or right-back for Uruguayan Primera División club Plaza Colonia.

== Career ==
Redín is a youth academy graduate of Plaza Colonia. He made his professional debut for the club on 1 June 2013 in a 3–0 loss to Sud América.

== Personal life ==
Redín is the older brother of footballer Miqueas Redín.

== Career statistics ==
As of 14 September 2025

Appearances and goals by club, season and competition
Club	Season	League			National cup (Note: Includes Copa Uruguay)		Continental		Other		Total	
Club	Season	Division	Apps	Goals	Apps	Goals	Apps	Goals	Apps	Goals	Apps	Goals
Plaza Colonia	2012–13	USD	1	0	—		—		0	0	1	0
Plaza Colonia	2013–14	USD	18	0	—		—		4 (Note: Appearance(s) in playoffs)	0	22	0
Plaza Colonia	2014–15	USD	25	6	—		—		—		25	6
Plaza Colonia	2015–16	UPD	26	0	—		—		0	0	26	0
Plaza Colonia	2016	UPD	11	0	—		1 (Note: Appearance(s) in Copa Sudamericana)	0	—		12	0
Plaza Colonia	2017	UPD	27	1	—		—		—		27	1
Plaza Colonia	2018	USD	6	1	—		—		—		6	1
Plaza Colonia	2019	UPD	31	0	—		—		—		31	0
Plaza Colonia	2020	UPD	29	1	—		4	0	—		33	1
Plaza Colonia	2021	UPD	17	0	—		—		1	0	18	0
Plaza Colonia	2022	UPD	25	1	2	0	2 (Note: Appearances in Copa Libertadores)	0	1 (Note: Appearance in Supercopa Uruguaya)	0	30	1
Plaza Colonia	2023	UPD	28	1	2	0	—		—		30	1
Plaza Colonia	2024	USD	28	0	1	0	—		—		29	0
Plaza Colonia	2025	UPD	28	0	2	0	—		—		30	0
Career total			300	11	7	0	7	0	6	0	320	11

== Honours ==
Plaza Colonia

- Uruguayan Segunda División: 2024
