= Diego López (footballer, born 1999) =

Uruguayan footballer

Personal information
- Full name: Diego López Reyes
- Date of birth: 6 April 1999 (age 27)
- Place of birth: Uruguay
- Position: Centre back

Team information
- Current team: Sud América
- Number: 3

Senior career*
Years	Team	Apps	(Gls)
2018–	Sud América	13	(0)
- * Club domestic league appearances and goals as of 20:25, 30 November 2020 (UTC)

Diego López Reyes (born 6 April 1999) is a Uruguayan professional footballer who plays as a defender for Sud América.

== Career ==
López started out in Sud América's ranks, he was moved into the Segunda División side's first-team for the 2018 season. Having made his professional bow during a home defeat to Cerrito on 12 August, López appeared in further encounters with Miramar Misiones, Oriental, Plaza Colonia and Deportivo Maldonado as Sud América placed seventh.

== Career statistics ==
As of 10 January 2019.

Club statistics
Club	Season	League			Continental		Other		Total	
Club	Season	Division	Apps	Goals	Apps	Goals	Apps	Goals	Apps	Goals
Sud América	2018	Segunda División	5	0	—		0	0	5	0
Sud América	2019	Segunda División	0	0	—		0	0	0	0
Career total			5	0	—		0	0	5	0
