= Emiliano Gómez =

Uruguayan footballer (born 2001)

Personal information
- Full name: Emiliano Gómez Dutra
- Date of birth: 18 September 2001 (age 25)
- Place of birth: Rivera, Uruguay
- Height: 1.78 m (5 ft 10 in)
- Position: Forward

Team information
- Current team: Tigres UANL
- Number: 9

Youth career
- Sarandí Universitario de Rivera
- Defensor Sporting

Senior career*
Years	Team	Apps	(Gls)
2018–2019	Defensor Sporting	21	(0)
2020	Boston River	0	(0)
2020	→ Sassuolo (loan)	0	(0)
2020–2022	Sassuolo	0	(0)
2020–2022	→ Albacete (loan)	22	(2)
2020–2021	→ Albacete B (loan)	12	(5)
2022–2024	Boston River	60	(18)
2024–2026	Puebla	63	(14)
2026–	Tigres UANL	0	(0)

International career^{‡}
2018–2019	Uruguay U20	21	(5)
2024–	Uruguay A'	1	(0)
- * Club domestic league appearances and goals as of 11 November 2024 ‡ National team caps and goals as of 31 May 2024

Emiliano Gómez Dutra (born 18 September 2001) is a Uruguayan professional footballer who plays as a forward for Liga MX club Tigres UANL. He was included in The Guardian's "Next Generation 2018", alongside compatriot and teammate Facundo Milán.

== Club career ==
On 31 January 2020, he joined Italian club Sassuolo on loan with an option to purchase. On 11 September, after being bought outright by Sassuolo, he was loaned to Spanish Segunda División side Albacete Balompié for the season, being initially assigned to the reserves in Tercera División.

== International career ==
In May 2024, Gómez was named in the first ever Uruguay A' national team squad. He made his Uruguay A' debut on 31 May 2024 in a goalless draw against Costa Rica.

== Career statistics ==
=== Club ===
As of 31 January 2020

Club	Season	League			Cup		Continental		Other		Total	
Club	Season	Division	Apps	Goals	Apps	Goals	Apps	Goals	Apps	Goals	Apps	Goals
Defensor Sporting	2018	Uruguayan Primera División	13	0	0	0	2 (Note: Appearances in the Copa Libertadores)	0	0	0	15	0
Defensor Sporting	2019	Uruguayan Primera División	7	0	0	0	0	0	0	0	7	0
Defensor Sporting	Total		21	0	0	0	2	0	0	0	23	0
Boston River	2020	Uruguayan Primera División	0	0	0	0	0	0	0	0	0	0
Sassuolo (loan)	2019–20	Serie A	0	0	0	0	0	0	0	0	0	0
Career total			21	0	0	0	2	0	0	0	23	0
