= Martín Fernández (footballer, born 2003) =

Uruguayan association football player

Personal information
- Full name: Martín Fernández Benítez
- Date of birth: 23 June 2003 (age 23)
- Place of birth: Montevideo, Uruguay
- Height: 1.71 m (5 ft 7 in)
- Position: Midfielder

Team information
- Current team: Gil Vicente (on loan from Boston River)
- Number: 32

Youth career
- –2020: Cerro

Senior career*
Years	Team	Apps	(Gls)
2020–2021	Cerro	6	(0)
2021–	Boston River	54	(4)
2023–2025	→ Miramar Misiones (loan)	55	(3)
2025–	→ Gil Vicente (loan)	26	(1)

International career^{‡}
2021	Uruguay U20	1	(0)
- * Club domestic league appearances and goals as of 25 May 2026 ‡ National team caps and goals as of 12 November 2025

Martín Fernández Benítez (born 23 June 2003) is a Uruguayan professional footballer who plays as a midfielder for Primeira Liga club Gil Vicente on loan from Boston River.

== Club career ==
Fernández is a youth academy graduate of Cerro. He made his professional debut for the club on 7 October 2020 in a 2–1 league defeat against Cerro Largo.

On 11 July 2025, Fernández was sent on a season-long loan with an optional buy-clause to Primeira Liga club Gil Vicente.

== International career ==
Fernández is a current Uruguayan youth international. On 23 October 2021, he was named in Uruguay under-20 squad for friendlies against Costa Rica and Honduras.

== Career statistics ==
As of match played 9 November 2025

Appearances and goals by club, season and competition
Club	Season	League			National cup (Note: Includes Copa Uruguay)		Continental		Total	
Club	Season	Division	Apps	Goals	Apps	Goals	Apps	Goals	Apps	Goals
Cerro	2020	Uruguayan Primera División	6	0	—		—		6	0
Boston River	2021	Uruguayan Primera División	22	1	—		—		22	1
Boston River	2022	Uruguayan Primera División	23	3	2	0	—		25	3
Boston River	2023	Uruguayan Primera División	9	0	0	0	2 (Note: Appearances in Copa Libertadores)	0	11	0
Boston River	Total		54	4	2	0	2	0	58	4
Miramar Misiones (loan)	2023	Uruguayan Segunda División	12	1	2	0	—		14	1
Miramar Misiones (loan)	2024	Uruguayan Primera División	23	0	—		—		23	0
Miramar Misiones (loan)	2025	Liga AUF Uruguaya	20	2	—		—		20	2
Miramar Misiones (loan)	Total		55	3	2	0	—		57	3
Gil Vicente (loan)	2025–26	Primeira Liga	9	1	0	0	—		9	1
Career total			124	8	4	0	2	0	130	8
