= Pablo Furtado =

Uruguayan football player (born 2004)

Personal information
- Full name: Pablo Nicolás Furtado Giménez
- Date of birth: 4 February 2004 (age 22)
- Place of birth: Tacuarembó, Uruguay
- Height: 1.68 m (5 ft 6 in)
- Position: Midfielder

Team information
- Current team: Atlético Rafaela

Youth career
- Boston River

Senior career*
| Years | Team | Apps | (Gls) |
| 2021–2026 | Boston River | 8 | (0) |
| 2024–2025 | → Tacuarembó (loan) | 62 | (6) |
| 2026– | Atlético Rafaela | 2 | (0) |

International career
| 2019 | Uruguay U15 | 20 | (1) |
| 2022 | Uruguay U20 | 2 | (0) |
- * Club domestic league appearances and goals as of 18:23, 27 March 2026 (UTC)

Pablo Nicolás Furtado Giménez (born 4 February 2004) is a Uruguayan professional footballer who plays as a midfielder for Primera Nacional club Atlético Rafaela.

== Club career ==
Furtado is a youth academy graduate of Boston River. He made his professional debut for the club on 16 July 2021 in a 1–0 league defeat against Progreso.

== International career ==
Furtado is a current Uruguay youth international. He was part of under-15 team at 2019 South American U-15 Championship. On 15 August 2021, under-17 team coach Diego Demarco named Furtado in 20-man squad for 2021 U-18 L'Alcúdia International Football Tournament.

== Career statistics ==
As of 2 October 2022

Appearances and goals by club, season and competition
| Club | Season | League | | | Cup | | Continental | | Total | |
| Club | Season | Division | Apps | Goals | Apps | Goals | Apps | Goals | Apps | Goals |
|---|---|---|---|---|---|---|---|---|---|---|
| Boston River | 2021 | Uruguayan Primera División | 5 | 0 | — | | — | | 5 | 0 |
| Boston River | 2022 | Uruguayan Primera División | 3 | 0 | 1 | 0 | — | | 4 | 0 |
| Career total | | | 8 | 0 | 1 | 0 | 0 | 0 | 9 | 0 |
