= Haibrany Ruiz Díaz =

Uruguayan footballer (born 1992)

Personal information
- Full name: Haibrany Nick Ruiz Díaz Minervino
- Date of birth: 31 August 1992 (age 34)
- Place of birth: Montevideo, Uruguay
- Height: 1.77 m (5 ft 10 in)
- Positions: Centre-back; right-back

Team information
- Current team: Deportivo Táchira (on loan from Plaza Colonia)
- Number: 16

Youth career
- Bella Vista

Senior career*
Years	Team	Apps	(Gls)
2011–2013	Bella Vista	44	(0)
2013–2014	Progreso	23	(2)
2014–2015	Boston River	24	(0)
2015–2016	Salam Zgharta	20	(2)
2016–2017	Rentistas	14	(0)
2017–2019	Villa Teresa	18	(1)
2019–	Plaza Colonia	119	(6)
2022	→ Platense (loan)	21	(0)
2024–	Deportivo Táchira (loan)	14	(0)
- * Club domestic league appearances and goals as of 20:20, 19 April 2022 (UTC)

Haibrany Nick Ruiz Díaz Minervino (born 31 August 1992) is a Uruguayan footballer who plays as a centre-back or right-back for Deportivo Táchira on loan from Plaza Colonia.
