= Mauro Alfonso =

Uruguayan footballer

Personal information
- Full name: Mauro Agustín Alfonso Madruga
- Date of birth: 16 June 2002 (age 24)
- Place of birth: Montevideo, Uruguay
- Height: 1.90 m (6 ft 3 in)
- Position: Centre-back

Team information
- Current team: Deutscher

Youth career
- 2018–2021: Villa Española

Senior career*
Years	Team	Apps	(Gls)
2021–2022	Villa Española	13	(0)
2023–2026	Boston River	1	(0)
2024	→ Rentistas (loan)	13	(1)
2025	→ Cerro Largo (loan)	4	(0)
2025	→ Unión San Felipe (loan)	5	(0)
2026–	Deutscher	0	(0)
- * Club domestic league appearances and goals as of 19 March 2026

Mauro Agustín Alfonso Madruga (born 16 June 2002) is a Uruguayan footballer who plays as a centre-back for Uruguayan Primera División Amateur club Deutscher.

== Career ==
A left-footed central defender, Alfonso started his career with Villa Española, was promoted to the first team and signed his first professional contract in February 2022.

In December 2022, Alfonso signed with Boston River in the Uruguayan Primera División. He was loaned out to Rentistas for the second half of 2024 and to Cerro Largo in January 2025.

In the second half of 2025, Alfonso moved abroad on loan to Chilean club Unión San Felipe.
