= Agustín Álvarez (footballer, born April 2001) =

Uruguayan footballer (born 2001)

Personal information
- Full name: Agustín Álvarez Wallace
- Date of birth: 20 April 2001 (age 25)
- Place of birth: Montevideo, Uruguay
- Height: 1.79 m (5 ft 10 in)
- Position: Midfielder

Team information
- Current team: Racing Club (on loan from Montevideo City Torque)
- Number: 21

Youth career
- 2005–2019: Peñarol

Senior career*
Years	Team	Apps	(Gls)
2019–2023	Peñarol	51	(0)
2023–	Montevideo City Torque	33	(1)
2024	→ Atlético Nacional (loan)	16	(0)
2024–2025	→ Unión La Calera (loan)	34	(0)
2026–	→ Racing Club (loan)	2	(0)

International career
2017	Uruguay U16	2	(0)
2018–2020	Uruguay U20	6	(0)
Medal record
Men's football
Representing Uruguay
South American Games
Silver medal – second place	2018 Cochabamba	Team
- * Club domestic league appearances and goals as of 10 March 2026

Agustín Álvarez Wallace (born 20 April 2001) is a Uruguayan professional footballer who plays as a midfielder for Uruguayan Primera División club Racing Club on loan from Montevideo City Torque.

== Club career ==
Álvarez joined the youth academy of Peñarol in 2005. He made his professional debut for the club on 27 July 2019 in a 2–0 league win against Danubio.

On 3 February 2023, Álvarez joined Montevideo City Torque on a permanent deal until December 2027. In 2024, he was loaned out to the Colombian club Atlético Nacional and the Chilean club Unión La Calera.

== International career ==
Álvarez is a former Uruguayan youth international.

== Personal life ==
Álvarez is the brother of former Uruguayan youth international Elbio Álvarez.

== Career statistics ==
As of 2 November 2022

Appearances and goals by club, season and competition
Club	Season	League			Cup		Continental		Other		Total	
Club	Season	Division	Apps	Goals	Apps	Goals	Apps	Goals	Apps	Goals	Apps	Goals
Peñarol	2019	Uruguayan Primera División	1	0	—		0	0	0	0	1	0
Peñarol	2020	Uruguayan Primera División	19	0	—		1 (Note: Appearance in Copa Libertadores.)	0	—		20	0
Peñarol	2021	Uruguayan Primera División	9	0	—		4 (Note: Appearances in Copa Sudamericana.)	0	1 (Note: Appearance in Championship playoff.)	0	14	0
Peñarol	2022	Uruguayan Primera División	22	0	5	0	0	0	1 (Note: Appearance in Supercopa Uruguaya.)	0	28	0
Career total			51	0	5	0	5	0	2	0	63	0

== Honours ==
Peñarol

- Uruguayan Primera División: 2021
- Supercopa Uruguaya: 2022

Uruguay U20

- South American Games silver medal: 2018
