= Kevin Lewis (footballer, born 1999) =

Uruguayan footballer

Personal information
- Full name: Kevin Mathías Lewis Rodríguez
- Date of birth: 8 January 1999 (age 27)
- Place of birth: Cebollatí, Uruguay
- Height: 1.72 m (5 ft 8 in)
- Position: Defender

Youth career
- San Vincente Chuy
- Peñarol

Senior career*
Years	Team	Apps	(Gls)
2018–2022	Peñarol	5	(0)
2021	→ Sud América (loan)	19	(0)
2022	→ Albion (loan)	14	(0)
2024–2025	Danubio	52	(1)
2025–2026	OFI	13	(0)

International career
2017	Uruguay U18	7	(0)
- * Club domestic league appearances and goals as of 16 January 2026

Kevin Mathias Lewis Rodríguez (born 8 January 1999) is a Uruguayan professional footballer who plays as a defender.

== Club career ==
Lewis is a youth academy graduate of Peñarol. He made his professional debut for the club on 27 May 2018 in a 2–1 league win against Atenas. On 16 April 2021, he joined Sud América on a season long loan deal.

On 14 July 2022, Lewis joined Albion on a one-year loan deal.

== International career ==
Lewis is a former Uruguayan youth international. He has made seven appearances for Uruguay's under-18 team.

== Honours ==
Peñarol

- Uruguayan Primera División: 2018
- Supercopa Uruguaya: 2022
