= Germán Ferreira =

Uruguayan footballer (born 1991)

Personal information
- Full name: Germán Ferreira Caceres
- Date of birth: April 4, 1991
- Place of birth: Minas, Uruguay
- Date of death: January 2022 (aged 30)
- Height: 1.84 m (6 ft 0 in)
- Position: Defender

Senior career*
Years	Team	Apps	(Gls)
2014–2016	Plaza Colonia	41	(0)
2016–2018	Leones Negros	10	(0)
2018	Rentistas	12	(0)
2018	Academia Puerto Cabello	12	(0)
Total		77	(0)
- * Club domestic league appearances and goals

Germán Ferreira Caceres (born April 4, 1991 in Minas) was a Uruguayan professional footballer who last played for Academia Puerto Cabello During his career he played with Plaza Colonia (2014–16), Leones Negros (2017), Rentistas (2018), and Academia Puerto Cabello (2018). His position was defender.

In January 2022 he was mysteriously murdered.
