= Germán Rivero =

Argentinian footballer

Personal information
- Full name: Germán Ariel Rivero
- Date of birth: 12 March 1992 (age 34)
- Place of birth: Garín, Argentina
- Position: Striker

Team information
- Current team: Deportivo Madryn

Youth career
- Argentinos Juniors

Senior career*
Years	Team	Apps	(Gls)
2013–2014	Flandria	24	(5)
2014	Fénix	17	(3)
2015–2016	Plaza Colonia	17	(8)
2017	Unión La Calera	11	(2)
2018–2019	Defensor Sporting	28	(10)
2019	→ Apollon Smyrnis (loan)	4	(0)
2019–2020	Alvarado	19	(11)
2020–2021	Patronato	9	(0)
2021	Ferro Carril Oeste	35	(6)
2022	Gimnasia de Mendoza	20	(3)
2023–2024	Almirante Brown	56	(6)
2024	Talleres RdE	15	(1)
2025–	Deportivo Madryn	16	(6)
- * Club domestic league appearances and goals as of 17:46, 3 August 2025 (UTC)

Germán Ariel Rivero (born 12 March 1992 in Argentina) is an Argentinean footballer who plays for Deportivo Madryn.

== Career ==
Rivero started his senior career with CSD Flandria. In 2016. he signed for Club Plaza Colonia de Deportes in the Uruguayan Primera División, where he made seventeen league appearances and scored eight goals. After that, he played for Unión La Calera, Defensor Sporting, Apollon Smyrnis, and Club Atlético Alvarado.

In the second half of 2024, Rivero moved on loan to Talleres de Remedios de Escalada from Almirante Brown.
