= Santiago de Ávila =

Uruguayan footballer (born 1993)

Personal information
- Full name: Santiago de Ávila de María
- Date of birth: 27 September 1993 (age 33)
- Place of birth: Colonia del Sacramento, Uruguay
- Height: 1.78 m (5 ft 10 in)
- Position: Defender

Youth career
- Juventud de Colonia
- Peñarol

Senior career*
Years	Team	Apps	(Gls)
2014-2016	Plaza Colonia	45	(1)
2016-2017	Montevideo City Torque	22	(0)
-2018	Juventud de Colonia		
2018	Miramar	10	(1)
2019-2020	Atenas	18	(0)
- * Club domestic league appearances and goals

Santiago de Ávila de María (born 27 September 1993) is a Uruguayan footballer who is last known to have played as a defender for Atenas.

== Career ==
Before the second half of 2013/14, de Ávila signed for Plaza Colonia in the Uruguayan second division after playing for the youth academy of Peñarol, Uruguay's most successful club, where he made 45 league appearances and scored 1 goal, suffering an injury and helping them win the 2016 Uruguayan top flight title after promotion After that, he signed for Uruguayan lower league side Juventud de Colonia but suffered an injury.
