= Rafael Haller =

Uruguayan football player (born 2000)

Personal information
- Full name: Rafael Germán Haller Piloni
- Date of birth: 17 August 2000 (age 26)
- Place of birth: Montevideo, Uruguay
- Height: 1.78 m (5 ft 10 in)
- Position: Right back

Team information
- Current team: Boston River (on loan from Nacional)
- Number: 17

Youth career
- 2013–2020: Danubio

Senior career*
Years	Team	Apps	(Gls)
2021–2023	Danubio	68	(2)
2024–	Nacional	4	(0)
2024	→ Atletico Goianiense (loan)	3	(0)
2025	→ C.A. Cerro (loan)	16	(0)
2025–	→ Boston River (loan)	4	(0)
- * Club domestic league appearances and goals as of 1 October 2025

Rafael Germán Haller Piloni (born 17 August 2000) is a Uruguayan professional footballer who plays as a right back for Boston River on loan from Nacional.

== Career ==
Born in Montevideo, Haller joined Danubio's youth setup at the age of 13. Promoted to the first team ahead of the 2021 season, he made his senior debut on 2 June of that year, starting in a 0–0 Segunda División away draw against Central Español.

Haller scored his first senior goal on 29 July 2021, netting the winner in a 1–0 home success over Rocha, and was a regular starter as the club achieved promotion to the Primera División. He made his top tier debut on 8 February 2022, starting in a 1–0 away win over Cerrito.

Haller scored his first goal in the top tier of Uruguayan football on 5 June 2022, netting the opener in a 2–1 home win over Nacional.

== Career statistics ==
As of 11 December 2023

Appearances and goals by club, season and competition
Club	Season	League			Cup		Continental		Other		Total	
Club	Season	Division	Apps	Goals	Apps	Goals	Apps	Goals	Apps	Goals	Apps	Goals
Danubio	2021	Segunda División	22	1	—		—		—		21	1
Danubio	2022	Primera División	24	1	1	0	—		—		25	1
Danubio	2023	Primera División	22	0	0	0	7 (Note: Appearance(s) in Copa Sudamericana)	1	—		29	1
Career total			68	2	1	0	7	1	0	0	75	3
