= Damián Timpani =

Argentine footballer

Personal information
- Full name: Damián Óscar Timpani
- Date of birth: August 8, 1969 (age 57)
- Place of birth: Buenos Aires, Argentina
- Height: 1.81 m (5 ft 11 in)
- Position: Defender

Senior career*
| Years | Team | Apps | (Gls) |
| 1989–1993 | All Boys | 44 | (3) |
| 1993–1994 | Chaco For Ever | 6 | (0) |
| 1994–1995 | Almirante Brown | 38 | (4) |
| 1995–1996 | Nueva Chicago | 13 | (0) |
| 1996–1997 | Almagro | 39 | (2) |
| 1997–1998 | Xerez | 18 | (0) |
| 1998–2000 | Elche | 49 | (2) |
| 2000–2002 | Real Murcia | 53 | (2) |
| 2002–2005 | Ciudad de Murcia | 44 | (3) |
| 2005 | Orihuela | 1 | (0) |
| 2005–2006 | Muleño | 0 | (0) |

Managerial career
- 2011: Los Andes
- 2012: Los Andes (Interim)
- 2014–2015: Palestino (Assistant)
- 2016: San Lorenzo (Assistant)
- 2016: Nueva Chicago
- 2017: Sud América
- 2018–2019: Al-Ahli (Assistant)
- 2019–2020: Morelia (Assistant)
- 2020–2021: Tijuana (Assistant)
- 2021–2022: Necaxa (Assistant)
- * Club domestic league appearances and goals as of 3 September 2007

Damián Óscar Timpani (born August 8, 1969) is an Argentine former footballer.

He played for several lower league clubs in Argentina before moving to Spain where he played for Xerez, Elche, Real Murcia, Ciudad de Murcia and Orihuela.
