= Álvaro Fuerte =

Uruguayan football manager

Personal information
- Full name: Álvaro Alejandro Fuerte Michetti
- Date of birth: 7 March 1971 (age 55)
- Place of birth: Las Piedras, Uruguay

Managerial career
- Years: Team
- 2014–2017: Juventud (youth)
- 2018–2019: Juventud
- 2021–2022: Progreso
- 2023: Atenas

Álvaro Alejandro Fuerte Michetti (born 7 March 1971) is a Uruguayan football manager, currently in charge of Progreso.

== Career ==
Born in Las Piedras, Fuerte was named manager of hometown side Juventud's youth categories in 2014, after previously playing for the club as a football and basketball player. On 21 December 2017, he was named manager of the first team in the Segunda División.

Fuerte led Juventud to the Primera División in his first season, but was sacked on 31 August 2019. On 21 August 2021, he replaced Maxi Viera at the helm of Progreso also in the top tier.
