= Diego Jaume =

Uruguayan footballer (born 1973)

Personal information
- Full name: Diego Jaume Favaro
- Date of birth: 9 October 1973 (age 53)
- Place of birth: Montevideo, Uruguay
- Height: 1.80 m (5 ft 11 in)
- Position: Centre back

Team information
- Current team: Boston River (youth manager)

Youth career
- América de Parque Miramar

Senior career*
Years	Team	Apps	(Gls)
1993–1998	Huracán Buceo	70	(2)
1999	Bella Vista	27	(0)
1999–2003	Numancia	87	(4)
2003–2004	Defensor Sporting	47	(2)
2005–2007	Nacional	46	(3)
2007–2008	Hércules	30	(4)
Total		306	(15)

Managerial career
- Rentistas (youth)
- 2021–2022: Rentistas
- 2024–: Boston River (youth)
- 2026: Boston River (interim)
- * Club domestic league appearances and goals

Diego Jaume Favaro (born 9 October 1973) is a Uruguayan football manager and former player who played as a central defender. He is the current manager of Boston River's youth categories.
