= Mario Orta =

Uruguayan footballer (born 1967)

Personal information
- Full name: Mario Teófilo Orta Olita
- Date of birth: 27 July 1967 (age 59)
- Place of birth: Montevideo, Uruguay
- Position: Midfielder

Senior career*
Years	Team	Apps	(Gls)
1985–1986	River Plate Montevideo		
1987	Liverpool Montevideo		
1987–1988	Herediano		
1989	Defensor Sporting		
1990–1991	Morelia	7	(0)
1991–1992	Deportivo Mandiyú	23	(1)
1992–1993	Saprissa		
1993–1996	Sud América		
1996–1997	Rentistas		
1997–1998	Rangers		
1998	Bella Vista	4	(0)
1999	Deportivo Maldonado	14	(8)
1999–2000	Rentistas		
2000–2001	Real España	1	(0)
2002–2003	Liverpool Montevideo	8	(0)
- * Club domestic league appearances and goals

Mario Teófilo Orta Olita (born 27 July 1967) is a Uruguayan former professional footballer who played as a midfielder for clubs of Uruguay, Argentina, Chile, Mexico, Costa Rica and Honduras.

== Teams ==
- (Uruguay) River Plate 1985–1986
- (Uruguay) Liverpool 1987
- (Costa Rica) Herediano 1987–1988
- (Uruguay) Defensor Sporting Club 1989
- (Mexico) Morelia 1990–1991
- (Argentina) Deportivo Mandiyú 1991–1992
- (Costa Rica) Saprissa 1992–1993
- (Uruguay) Sud América 1993–1996
- (Uruguay) Rentistas 1996–1997
- (Chile) Rangers 1997–1998
- (Uruguay) C.A. Bella Vista 1998
- (Uruguay) Deportivo Maldonado 1999
- (Uruguay) Rentistas 1999–2000
- (Honduras) Real España 2000–2001
- (Uruguay) Liverpool 2002–2003
