= Luis da Luz =

Uruguayan footballer (born 1968)

Personal information
- Full name: Luis Eduardo da Luz Pereira
- Date of birth: 2 June 1968 (age 58)
- Place of birth: Montevideo, Uruguay
- Height: 1.72 m (5 ft 8 in)
- Position: Defender

Senior career*
Years	Team	Apps	(Gls)
1988–1993	Danubio		
1994–1997	Sud América		
1998	Central Español		

International career
1992	Uruguay	1	(0)
- * Club domestic league appearances and goals

Luis da Luz (born 2 June 1968 in Montevideo) is a former Uruguayan footballer.

== Club career ==
Da Luz helped Sud América win Uruguayan Segunda División in 1994, and the following season scored a goal in Sud América's 4–0 rout of Club Gimnasia y Esgrima La Plata in the first round of the Copa CONMEBOL.

== International career ==
Da Luz made one appearance for the senior Uruguay national football team a friendly against Brazil on 25 November 1992.
