= Martín Varini =

Uruguayan footballer and manager (born 1991)

Personal information
- Full name: Martín Varini Dizioli
- Date of birth: 2 August 1991 (age 35)
- Place of birth: Montevideo, Uruguay
- Height: 1.86 m (6 ft 1 in)
- Position: Centre back

Youth career
- 2004–2012: Defensor Sporting

Senior career*
Years	Team	Apps	(Gls)
2011–2013	Defensor Sporting	0	(0)

International career
2010	Uruguay U20	2	(0)

Managerial career
- 2016–2021: Defensor Sporting (youth)
- 2021: Rentistas
- 2022–2023: Cruzeiro (assistant)
- 2023: Valladolid (assistant)
- 2024: Defensor Sporting
- 2024: Athletico Paranaense
- 2025: FC Juárez
- 2026: Necaxa
- * Club domestic league appearances and goals

Martín Varini Dizioli (born 2 August 1991) is a Uruguayan football manager and former player who played as a central defender.

== Playing career ==
Born in Montevideo, Varini joined Defensor Sporting's youth setup in 2004, aged 13. He was promoted to the first team in 2011, and also took part of the 2012 U-20 Copa Libertadores Final against River Plate.

Varini moved to Italy in 2013 to join Italian side Varese, but the move did not materialize. Upon returning, he retired at the age of just 22.

== Managerial career ==
After retiring, Varini graduated in business administration before returning to his former club Defensor in February 2017, as manager of the youth team. On 9 April 2021, at the age of just 29, he replaced Alejandro Cappuccio as manager of Primera División side Rentistas, and became the youngest manager of the 2021 Copa Libertadores.

Varini's managerial debut occurred on 21 April 2021, in a 1–1 Libertadores home draw against Racing Club. On 2 October, after only four wins in 25 matches, he left Rentistas on a mutual agreement.

Ahead of the 2022 season, Varini joined Paulo Pezzolano's staff at Brazilian club Cruzeiro, as his assistant. He followed Pezzolano to Spanish club Real Valladolid, but left on 7 December 2023 to take over Defensor Sporting back in his home country.

Varini resigned from Defensor on 7 July 2024, after accepting an offer from a Brazilian club, and was announced as head coach of Athletico Paranaense two days later. He was sacked from the latter club on 23 September.

In November 2024, he took charge of FC Juárez ahead of the Clausura 2025. During the Apertura 2025, he guided the club to its first-ever play-off qualification in history, before departing at the end of the tournament. In December 2025, Varini was appointed as the new head coach of Necaxa. He was relieved of his duties on 12 September 2026.

== Managerial statistics ==
As of 12 September 2026

Managerial record by team and tenure
Team	Nat.	From	To	Record								Ref
Team	Nat.	From	To	G	W	D	L	GF	GA	GD	Win %	Ref
Rentistas	(Uruguay)	9 April 2021	2 October 2021	25	4	7	14	18	39	−21	16.00	
Defensor Sporting	(Uruguay)	7 December 2023	7 July 2024	26	14	7	5	45	26	+19	53.85	
Athletico Paranaense	(Brazil)	9 July 2024	23 September 2024	19	9	4	6	26	21	+5	47.37	
FC Juárez	(Mexico)	29 November 2024	30 November 2025	42	14	15	13	55	60	−5	33.33	
Necaxa	(Mexico)	8 December 2025	12 September 2026	28	8	5	15	31	44	−13	28.57	
Career total				140	49	38	53	175	190	−15	35.00	—

== Honours ==
Defensor Sporting

- Copa Uruguay: 2023
