= Cristian Palacios =

Uruguayan footballer (born 1990)

Personal information
- Full name: Cristian Martín Palacios Ferreira
- Date of birth: 2 September 1990 (age 36)
- Place of birth: Salto, Uruguay
- Height: 1.70 m (5 ft 7 in)
- Position: Forward

Team information
- Current team: Everton

Youth career
- Peñarol

Senior career*
Years	Team	Apps	(Gls)
2009–2018	Peñarol	46	(28)
2010–2011	→ Central Español (loan)	14	(15)
2011–2012	→ Atlético Tucumán (loan)	18	(2)
2012–2014	→ El Tanque Sisley (loan)	22	(2)
2014	→ Olmedo (loan)	40	(9)
2014–2015	→ Juventud Las Piedras (loan)	14	(13)
2016–2017	→ Temperley (loan)	10	(0)
2017	→ Montevideo Wanderers (loan)	20	(19)
2018–2021	Puebla	9	(0)
2019	→ Sporting Cristal (loan)	33	(14)
2020	→ Unión Española (loan)	22	(15)
2021	Unión Española	19	(14)
2022–2024	Universidad de Chile	69	(30)
2025–	Everton	0	(0)
- * Club domestic league appearances and goals as of 10 January 2025

Cristian Martín Palacios Ferreira (Note: In this Spanish name, the first or paternal surname is Palacios and the second or maternal family name is Ferreira.) (born September 2, 1990, in Salto, Uruguay), known as Cristian Palacios, is a Uruguayan naturalized Chilean footballer currently playing for the Chilean club Everton.

== Career ==
Born in Salto, Uruguay, Palacios moved to Montevideo at the age of 17, joining the youth system of Peñarol. He made his professional debut in 2009.

In 2025, Palacios signed with Everton de Viña del Mar from Universidad de Chile on a deal until 2026.

== Personal life ==
Palacios got the Chilean nationality by residence in June 2024.

== Titles ==
- Peñarol 2009-2010 (Uruguayan Primera División Championship)
