= Alejandro Cappuccio =

Uruguayan football coach and notary

Personal information
- Full name: Alejandro Martín Cappuccio Díaz
- Date of birth: 7 February 1976 (age 50)
- Place of birth: Montevideo, Uruguay
- Position: Defender

Team information
- Current team: Cerro (manager)

Youth career
- Years: Team
- 1990–1994: Nacional

Managerial career
- 2011: Montevideo Wandrers (youth)
- 2012: Juventud (youth)
- 2013–2014: Fénix (youth)
- 2015–2017: Peñarol (youth)
- 2017–2018: Montevideo Wandrers (youth)
- 2018–2021: Rentistas
- 2021: Nacional
- 2022: Plaza Colonia
- 2023–2024: Montevideo Wanderers
- 2026–: Cerro

Alejandro Martín Cappuccio Díaz (born 7 February 1976 in Montevideo) is a Uruguayan notary, lawyer and football manager. He is the current manager of Cerro.

== Career ==
Cappuccio marked his name as one of Rentistas' great idols. This is because, in addition to taking the team to the 1st division in 2019, it guided the team to the historic title of Apertura Uruguayo 2020 and guaranteed a place in the South American Copa Libertadores 2021. On 14 October 2020 Cappuccio led Rentistas to a decisive 1-0 victory against Club Nacional de Football in a playoff.

So, even in a pandemic year, the team overcame not only the virus, but the giants Peñarol and Nacional, to take the unprecedented trophy to Bichos Colorados after 87 years of life. In an exclusive to Brazilian web site Futebol na Veia, Cappuccio spoke about the assembly of the champion cast: “It started in January 2019, seeking access to the 1st division, which has been achieved. And there were 14 players for the year 2020. We did a scout with athletes with a very good track record in previous years and not so good nowadays, to be able to bring them, economically speaking, since we have the lowest investment of the 16 clubs of the 1st division of Uruguay. We talked to the players who would try to be in 3rd, 4th place, so that they would once again enter the elite football market. And they achieved that, they gave themselves up to the game model and we left champions of Apertura Uruguaio”. Cappuccio graduated as a physical education teacher in 1998 and notary public in 2000. He has been actively involved in football since his youth; he played with Nacional 1990-1994. Soon he started his career as a football coach.
