= Cristián Alfaro =

Argentine footballer

Personal information
- Full name: Cristián Francisco Orlando Alfaro
- Date of birth: 8 September 1977 (age 49)
- Place of birth: Salta, Argentina
- Height: 1.77 m (5 ft 10 in)
- Position: Forward

Youth career
- Juventud Antoniana

Senior career*
Years	Team	Apps	(Gls)
1999–2002	Juventud Antoniana	63	(17)
2002	Oriente Petrolero	16	(7)
2003	Juventud Antoniana		
2003	The Strongest	13	(2)
2004–2005	Juventud Antoniana	72	(18)
2006	Huracán	20	(3)
2007–2008	Chacarita Juniors	28	(5)
2008–2009	Santiago Wanderers	50	(17)
2010	Unión Temuco	25	(6)
2011	Central Norte		
2011–2012	Nueva Chicago	26	(9)
2012–2013	Atlanta	9	(0)
2013	Talleres de Perico		
2013–2016	Mitre de Salta	68	(38)
Medal record
Second place	Bolivian Primera División	2002
First place	Bolivian Primera División	2003
Second place	Primera B de Chile	2009
- * Club domestic league appearances and goals

Cristián Francisco Orlando Alfaro (born September 8, 1977, in Salta) is an Argentine former footballer who played as a forward.

== Career ==
Alfaro started his career with Juventud Antoniana. In his homeland, he also played for Huracán, Chacarita Juniors, Central Norte, Nueva Chicago, Atlanta, Talleres de Perico and Mitre de Salta.

Abroad, he played for both Oriente Petrolero and The Strongest in Bolivia and both Santiago Wanderers and Unión Temuco in Chile.

== Titles ==
- The Strongest 2003 (Torneo Clausura)
