= Guillermo Reyes (footballer) =

Uruguayan footballer (born 1986)

Personal information
- Full name: Guillermo Martín Reyes Maneiro
- Date of birth: 10 July 1986 (age 40)
- Place of birth: Mercedes, Uruguay
- Height: 1.86 m (6 ft 1 in)
- Position: Goalkeeper

Team information
- Current team: Plaza Colonia
- Number: 22

Youth career
- Colo-Colo

Senior career*
Years	Team	Apps	(Gls)
2007	Danubio		
2007–2009	Peñarol	2	(0)
2009–2010	Rocha	17	(0)
2010–2016	Rentistas	129	(0)
2014–2015	→ Huachipato (loan)	19	(0)
2016–2019	Defensor Sporting	76	(0)
2020–2021	Universidad de Concepción	64	(0)
2022–2024	Deportivo Maldonado	88	(0)
2025-	Plaza Colonia	5	(0)
- * Club domestic league appearances and goals as of 8 November 2025

Guillermo Martín Reyes Maneiro (born 10 July 1986) is an Uruguayan footballer who plays for Uruguayan Primera División side Plaza Colonia.

== Career statistics ==
As of 9 April 2022.

Appearances and goals by club, season and competition
Club	Division	League			Cup		Continental		Total	
Club	Division	Season	Apps	Goals	Apps	Goals	Apps	Goals	Apps	Goals
Rentistas	Uruguayan Primera División	2011-12	28	0	—		—		28	0
Rentistas	Uruguayan Segunda División	2012-13	25	0	—		—		25	0
Rentistas	Uruguayan Primera División	2013-14	28	0	—		—		28	0
Huachipato	Chilean Primera División	2013-14	—		—		0	0	0	0
Huachipato	Chilean Primera División	2014-15	19	0	1	0	—		20	0
Huachipato	Total		19	0	1	0	0	0	20	0
Club Atlético Rentistas	Uruguayan Primera División	2015-16	30	0	—		—		30	0
Club Atlético Rentistas	Total		111	0	0	0	0	0	111	0
Defensor Sporting	Uruguayan Primera División	2015-16	12	0	—		—		12	0
Defensor Sporting	Uruguayan Primera División	2016-17	37	0	—		2	0	39	0
Defensor Sporting	Uruguayan Primera División	2017-18	26	0	—		6	0	32	0
Defensor Sporting	Total		75	0	0	0	8	0	83	0
Universidad de Concepción	Chilean Primera División	2019-20	34	0	—		—		34	0
Universidad de Concepción	Primera B de Chile	2020-21	30	0	0	0	—		30	0
Universidad de Concepción	Total		64	0	0	0	0	0	64	0
Deportivo Maldonado	Uruguayan Primera División	2021-22	36	0	—		—		36	0
Deportivo Maldonado	Uruguayan Primera División	2022-23	—		0	0	—		0	0
Deportivo Maldonado	Total		36	0	0	0	0	0	36	0
Career total			305	0	1	0	8	0	314	0
