= Yvo Calleros =

Uruguayan football player (born 1998)

Personal information
- Full name: Yvo Nahuel Calleros Rébori
- Date of birth: 14 March 1998 (age 28)
- Place of birth: Carmelo, Uruguay
- Height: 1.81 m (5 ft 11 in)
- Position: Defensive midfielder

Team information
- Current team: SHB Da Nang
- Number: 5

Senior career*
Years	Team	Apps	(Gls)
2018–2026	Plaza Colonia	185	(2)
2022	→ The Strongest (loan)	0	(0)
2023–2024	→ Banfield (loan)	27	(0)
2024	→ Boston River (loan)	10	(0)
2026	Deportivo Madryn	10	(2)
2026–	SHB Da Nang	0	(0)
- * Club domestic league appearances and goals as of 14:03, 30 July 2026 (UTC)

Yvo Nahuel Calleros Rébori (born 14 March 1998) is a Uruguayan professional footballer who plays as a defensive midfielder for V.League 1 club SHB Da Nang.

== Career statistics ==
As of match played 18 February 2024

Appearances and goals by club, season and competition
Club	Division	League			Cup		Continental		Total	
Club	Division	Season	Apps	Goals	Apps	Goals	Apps	Goals	Apps	Goals
Plaza Colonia	Uruguayan Segunda División	2018	13	0	0	0	—		13	0
Plaza Colonia	Uruguayan Primera División	2019	31	0	0	0	—		31	0
Plaza Colonia	Uruguayan Primera División	2020	31	0	0	0	4	0	35	0
Plaza Colonia	Uruguayan Primera División	2021	30	2	0	0	—		30	2
Plaza Colonia	Uruguayan Primera División	2022	19	0	1	0	2	0	22	0
Plaza Colonia	Uruguayan Primera División	2023	23	0	0	0	—		23	0
Plaza Colonia	Total		147	2	1	0	6	0	154	2
The Strongest	Bolivian Primera División	2022	—		—		7	0	7	0
Banfield	Argentine Primera División	2023	9	0	0	0	—		9	0
Banfield	Argentine Primera División	2024	6	0	0	0	—		6	0
Banfield	Total		15	0	0	0	0	0	15	0
Career total			162	2	1	0	13	0	176	2
