= Bruno Piano =

Uruguayan footballer (born 1977)

Personal information
- Full name: Bruno Nicolás Piano Rosewarne
- Date of birth: 4 April 1977 (age 49)
- Place of birth: Montevideo, Uruguay
- Height: 1.79 m (5 ft 10 1/2 in)
- Position: Centre-back

Team information
- Current team: Nacional (assistant)

Senior career*
Years	Team	Apps	(Gls)
1997–2001	Danubio	75	(0)
2002	Deportivo Maldonado	30	(9)
2003–2004	Universitario	5	(0)
2005	Cerro	24	(5)
2006	Deportivo Maldonado	51	(10)
2006–2007	YF Juventus	28	(2)
2007–2009	APEP FC	41	(0)
2009	Atromitos Yeroskipou	3	(0)
2010	Rampla Juniors	6	(0)
2010	Santiago Morning	6	(0)
2011	Deportivo Maldonado	8	(0)
2011–2012	C.A.I.	20	(3)
2012–2014	El Tanque Sisley	36	(1)
Total		333	(30)

Managerial career
- 2015: Defensor Sporting (assistant)
- 2015–2016: Al-Wakrah (assistant)
- 2017: Godoy Cruz (assistant)
- 2018: O'Higgins (assistant)
- 2019: Danubio (assistant)
- 2020: Montevideo Wanderers (youth)
- 2021: Villa Española
- 2021: Rocha
- 2022: Peñarol (assistant)
- 2023: Deportivo Maldonado (assistant)
- 2022–: Nacional (assistant)
- * Club domestic league appearances and goals

Bruno Nicolás Piano Rosewarne (born 4 April 1977) is an Uruguayan football manager and former player who played as a central defender. He is the current assistant coach of Nacional.

== Career ==
Besides Uruguay, Piano played in Peru, Switzerland, Cyprus, Chile and Argentina.

In Peru, he played for Universitario in the first half of 2003.

In Switzerland, he played for YF Juventus in 2006.

In Cyprus, he played for APEP FC and Atromitos Yeroskipou from 2007 to 2009.

In Chile, he played for Santiago Morning in 2010.

In Argentina, he played for Comisión de Actividades Infantiles (C.A.I.) in 2011–12.

== Personal life ==
Piano holds an Italian passport.
