= Luis López (football manager, born 1961) =

Uruguayan football manager

Personal information
- Full name: Rubén Luis López Quinteros
- Date of birth: 25 June 1961 (age 65)
- Place of birth: Montevideo, Uruguay

Managerial career
- Years: Team
- 1998–1999: Cerrito
- 2001: Platense Montevideo
- 2002: El Tanque Sisley
- 2004: Sud América
- 2005–2006: Cerro (assistant)
- 2006: Bella Vista (youth)
- 2007: Rampla Juniors
- 2008: Juventud de Las Piedras
- 2009: Fénix
- 2010–2011: Juventud de Las Piedras
- 2012–2013: Rampla Juniors
- 2014–2015: Central Español
- 2017–2018: Rampla Juniors
- 2019: Sud América (interim)
- 2020: Sud América (interim)
- 2021: Sud América
- 2023: Rampla Juniors

Rubén Luis López Quinteros (born 25 June 1961) is a Uruguayan football manager. He is nicknamed El Ronco.

== Career ==
Born in Montevideo, López began his career with Cerrito in 1998. In the 2006–07 season he led Rampla Juniors away from relegation, and finished third in the 2007 Apertura before leaving the club for Juventud de Las Piedras in June 2008. He was sacked from the latter club in September.

López spent a short period in charge of Fénix before returning to Juventud in 2010, but was sacked from the latter in April 2011. He returned to Rampla in November of the following year, but resigned in July 2013.

López was in charge of Central Español during the 2014–15 Uruguayan Segunda División season, before returning to Rampla in 2016 as a sporting director. On 17 April 2017, he was again appointed manager after Fernando Araújo resigned.

López resigned from Rampla on 6 May 2018, and was named sporting director at Sud América the following 25 January. He was an interim manager of the side on two occasions during the 2019 and 2020 campaigns before leaving the club on 1 June 2021, stating a desire to return to managerial duties.

On 5 October 2021, López returned to Sud América, now as manager.

== Personal life ==
López's sons Nicolás and Sebastián are both footballers and forwards.
