= Ignacio Panzariello =

Uruguayan footballer (born 1990)

Personal information
- Full name: Juan Ignacio Panzariello Cambre
- Date of birth: 8 July 1990 (age 36)
- Place of birth: Montevideo, Uruguay
- Height: 1.78 m (5 ft 10 in)
- Position: Right winger

Team information
- Current team: Sud América
- Number: 32

Senior career*
Years	Team	Apps	(Gls)
2010–2014	Racing Club	8	(0)
2012	→ Huracán (loan)		
2013	→ Huracán (loan)	7	(0)
2014	→ Central Español (loan)	17	(5)
2014–2015	Deportivo Carchá		
2015–2017	Canadian	11	(0)
2017–2018	Rampla Juniors	35	(3)
2018–2019	Cienciano	14	(1)
2019	Rampla Juniors	18	(1)
2020–	Sud América	31	(0)
- * Club domestic league appearances and goals as of 19:12, 13 July 2021 (UTC)

Juan Ignacio Panzariello Cambre (born 8 July 1990) is a Uruguayan footballer who plays as a forward for Sud América in the Uruguayan Segunda División.
