= Maxi Viera =

Uruguayan footballer and manager (born 1968)

Maximiliano Viera Dutra
Personal information
- Full name: Maximiliano Viera Dutra
- Date of birth: 24 October 1968 (age 58)
- Place of birth: Montevideo, Uruguay
- Height: 1.69 m (5 ft 7 in)
- Position: Midfielder

Senior career*
Years	Team	Apps	(Gls)
1983–1987	Peñarol	86	(15)
1989–1991	Rampla Juniors	45	(5)
1992–1993	Huracán Buceo	36	(2)
1993–1994	Macará	23	(2)
1994–1995	Sud América	44	(2)
1995–1996	Regional Atacama	15	(2)
1996–1997	Sud América	46	(16)
1999	San Jose Clash	0	(0)
1999	San Francisco Bay Seals	1	(0)
2000	St. Louis Ambush	33	(4)
2001	Tucson Fireballs	23	(6)
Total		352	(54)

Managerial career
- 2009–2010: Fullerton Rangers
- 2015–2017: Qatar (assistant)
- 2017–2018: FC Arizona
- 2018: Miramar Misiones
- 2019: Montevideo Wanderers (assistant)
- 2020: Deportivo Cali (assistant)
- 2020–2021: Sud América
- 2021: Progreso
- 2022: Central Español
- 2022–2023: AEP Kozani F.C.
- 2024: Moca FC
- 2025: River Plate
- * Club domestic league appearances and goals

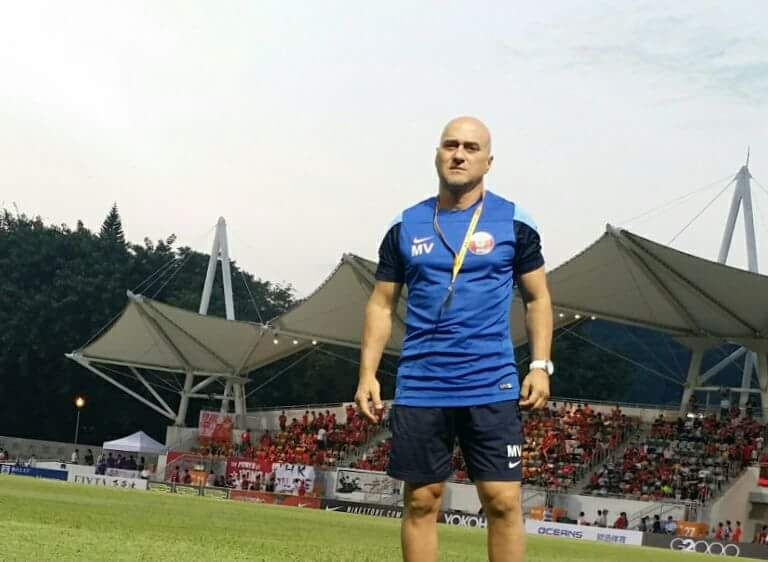
Qatar vs Hong Kong 2016 World Cup Qualifiers Russia 2018

Maximiliano "Maxi" Viera Dutra (born 24 October 1968) is a Uruguayan football manager and former player who played as a midfielder.

== Playing career ==
Viera, son of Uruguayan international Milton Viera, graduated from Italian High School in Montevideo, Uruguay. In 1983, he began his professional career with C.A. Peñarol before moving to Rampla Juniors in 1989. In 1992, Viera moved to Ecuador to play for Macará Ambato for one season before returning to Uruguay to join Huracán Buceo and Sud América in 1994. In 1995, Viera moved to Chile to play for Regional Atacama before moving to the United States.

On February 7, 1999, the San Jose Clash selected Viera in the first round (11th overall) of the 1999 MLS Supplemental Draft. Viera spent most of his time with the Clash on injured reserves with a broken right clavicle. Viera was up for selection off the bench June 3, 1999 vs Colorado Rapids. On June 30, 1999, the Clash waived Viera. He played one game for the San Francisco Bay Seals in 1999. He signed with the Colorado Rapids for the remainder of the 1999 season, made no appearances. In February 2000, he signed with the St. Louis Ambush of the National Professional Soccer League. The Ambush folded at the end of the season. In 2001, Viera played for the Tucson Fireballs.

== Coaching career ==
Coach Viera has achieved great success in Arizona after retiring from professional Football, has won many State Championship in Arizona and over 20 Tournaments in the US with different age groups of Boys and Men and Girls and Women from 2002 until 2014. Coach Viera received the award of VYSL "Coach of the year 2006 and 2007. In 2009 he received his Diploma for his National USSF B License Concacaf and decided to work back at the Elite levels of soccer.

Viera was the Technical Director of the Ahwatukee Foothills Soccer Club in Phoenix Arizona from 2011 to 2015, before he signed with the Qatar national football team as the assistant coach of compatriots José Daniel Carreño and Jorge Fossati. In 2017 Legacy Arizona asked Coach Viera to work in the Club and to mentor younger coaches as Assistant Director in the club until 2018.

In 2018, Viera was hired by FC Arizona (NPSL) as the Head Coach. After making the play-offs, he decided to take the job in South America and in July of the same year decided to move to Uruguay and coached Miramar Misiones, a Uruguayan Professional Second Division Team for the Torneo Clausura.

In 2019 Montevideo Wanderers FC announced on their media account that coach Viera signed for the season 2019–20 with the club. In 2020, he joined Deportivo Cali's staff before being appointed manager of Sud América. In January 2021 after two Playoff’s finals vs Rampla Juniors (2-1) and (2-3) Sud América finally after many years in the Uruguayan Second Division returned to First Division under the lidership of coach Viera. Immediately the team known as the “Mailboxes” or Buzón thanked coach Viera on social media that in an “Unprecedented Event in the club's 114 years existence to have achieved Promotions in 1994/95 and in 2021 first as a player and later as the Coach.

In 2021, Viera became the new coach of Club Atlético Progreso.

In 2022 Central Español Football Club a former Uruguayan Champion (1984) announced in their website Coach Viera as the new Head Coach.

In April 2025 River Plate of Uruguay announced in a press conference Julio César Ribas as the new head coach of River Plate after 6 years coaching the Gibraltar National team. Ribas asked coach Viera to work with him as the defensive coordinator and assistant coach. Coach Viera and Ribas won 2 championships together, Viera as captain in 1994 and the Uruguayan Integración Cup 1995 for the Institución Atlética Sudamerica (IASA), Ribas was Maximiliano Viera's coach until 1996.

Coach Viera previously had signed in 2023 for AEP Kozani in Greece and coached Concacaf Champions League with Moca FC from the Dominican Republic.
