= Facundo Milán =

Uruguayan footballer (born 2001)

Personal information
- Full name: Facundo Nahuel Milán Osorio
- Date of birth: 3 February 2001 (age 25)
- Place of birth: Montevideo, Uruguay
- Height: 1.84 m (6 ft 0 in)
- Position: Forward

Team information
- Current team: Deportivo Maldonado
- Number: 9

Youth career
- Defensor Sporting
- 2021–2022: São Paulo

Senior career*
| Years | Team | Apps | (Gls) |
| 2017–2021 | Defensor Sporting | 37 | (7) |
| 2022– | Montevideo Wanderers | 41 | (5) |
| 2024– | → Deportivo Maldonado (loan) | 1 | (0) |

International career
| 2016–2017 | Uruguay U17 | 14 | (2) |
| 2018–2019 | Uruguay U20 | 7 | (1) |
- * Club domestic league appearances and goals as of 4 September 2024

Facundo Nahuel Milán Osorio (born 3 February 2001) is a Uruguayan footballer who plays as forward for Deportivo Maldonado on loan from Montevideo Wanderers.
