= Sud América =

Association football club in Uruguay

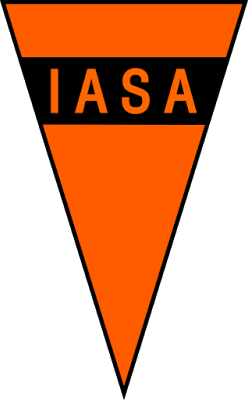
- Full name: Institución Atlética Sud América
- Nicknames: Buzones (Postboxes); Naranjitas (Little Oranges)
- Founded: February 15, 1914; 112 years ago
- Ground: Parque Carlos Ángel Fossa; Montevideo, Uruguay
- Capacity: 6,000
- Chairman: José Vicente
- Manager: Luis López
- League: Segunda División
- 2021: Primera División, 14th (relegated)
- Website: iasauy.com
Home colours	Away colours

Institución Atlética Sud América, usually known as Sud América or just IASA, is a football club from Montevideo. They currently play in the Uruguayan Segunda Division.

== History ==
Sud América was formed from the team formerly known as the "Montevideo Helios".

Sud América has won the Uruguayan 2nd Division on 7 occasions, this is a national record they share with Fénix. It was a hard-to-beat team back in the days and it was very economically stable.

After the relegation to 2nd Division in 1996, Sud América competed consecutively without success for 16 seasons, becoming the most popular team of the division. In the 2013 season (17th consecutive season in second) the club achieved the promotion to the Elite Division complying with its objectives wanting to return to it as a celebration of its centenary.

Sud América usually play their home games at Estadio Carlos Angel Fossa which is located in Montevideo and has a capacity of 6,000 spectators.

== Kit evolution ==
1914	1932-present

== Performance in CONMEBOL competitions ==
- Copa CONMEBOL: 1 appearances

1995: Second Round

1995 Copa CONMEBOL

October 24, 1995 First round	Gimnasia LP (Argentina)	1–0	(Uruguay) Sud América	La Plata, Argentina
	Guglielminpietro	Report		Stadium: Estadio Juan Carmelo Zerillo

October 31, 1995 First round	Sud América (Uruguay)	4–0	(Argentina) Gimnasia LP	Paysandú, Uruguay
	Alfaro; Oddine; Lujambio da Luz	Report		Stadium: Estadio Parque Artigas

November 15, 1995 Quarterfinals	Sud América (Uruguay)	0–1	(Paraguay) Atlético Colegiales	Paysandú, Uruguay
		Report	Espínola	Stadium: Estadio Parque Artigas

November 22, 1995 Quarterfinals	Atlético Colegiales (Paraguay)	1–2 (4–3 p)	(Uruguay) Sud América	Asunción, Paraguay
	Gómez	Report	Acevedo; Lujambio	Stadium: Estadio Manuel Ferreira
	Penalties
	Candia (penalty scored); Goroso (penalty scored); Gómez (penalty scored); Almada (penalty scored)		Orta (penalty scored); Alfaro (penalty scored); Landaida (penalty scored); Russomando (penalty missed); Lujambio (penalty missed)

Sud América eliminated via penalties (4–3) due to draw on points 3–3.

== Current squad ==
As of 16 October 2021

Note: Flags indicate national team as defined under FIFA eligibility rules; some limited exceptions apply. Players may hold more than one non-FIFA nationality.

No.	Pos.	Nation	Player
1	GK	URU	Stéfano Perdomo
2	DF	URU	Santiago Etchebarne
3	DF	URU	Diego López
4	DF	URU	Guillermo Rodríguez
5	MF	BRA	Jorge Pedra
6	DF	URU	Mateo Cantera
7	FW	URU	Pablo Olivera
9	FW	URU	Marcos Camarda
10	MF	URU	Bruno Giménez
11	FW	ARG	Pablo Mouche
12	GK	URU	Juan González
14	FW	URU	Rodrigo Pastorini
15	DF	URU	Nicolás Rodríguez
16	DF	URU	Nicolás Barán

No.	Pos.	Nation	Player
18	FW	URU	Nahuel Acosta
19	FW	URU	Álex Santeyano
21	MF	URU	Pablo Caballero
22	DF	URU	Agustín Cayetano
23	MF	ARG	Tomás Andrade
27	DF	URU	Luis Morales
28	DF	URU	Martín Mondino
29	FW	URU	Jorge Ramírez
32	FW	URU	Ignacio Panzariello
33	DF	URU	Matías Toma
34	MF	URU	Kevin Lewis
40	FW	URU	Joaquín Perdomo
97	MF	URU	Germán Triunfo

== Managers ==
- (Uruguay) José María Rodríguez (1978, 1980 – 1981)
- (Uruguay) Julio César Ribas (Jan 1, 1994 – Dec 31, 1995)
- (Uruguay) Julio Acuña (Jan 1, 2003 – July 1, 2003)
- (Uruguay) Luis López (2004)
- (Uruguay) Tabaré Silva (Aug 1, 2009 – May 21, 2010)
- (Uruguay) Alejandro Apud (Aug 1, 2011 – June 30, 2014)
- (Argentina) Jorge Vivaldo (July 15, 2014 – Oct 5, 2015)
- (Uruguay) Julio Comesaña (2015 – 2016)
- (Uruguay) Maxi Viera (Oct 8, 2020 – Feb 10, 2021)
- (Argentina) Claudio Biaggio (Mar 6, 2021 – Oct 4, 2021)
- (Uruguay) Luis López (Oct 5, 2021 – )

== Titles ==
- Segunda División: 7

1951, 1954, 1957, 1963, 1975, 1994, 2013

- Divisional Intermedia: 1

1926
