= Boston River =

Uruguayan football club

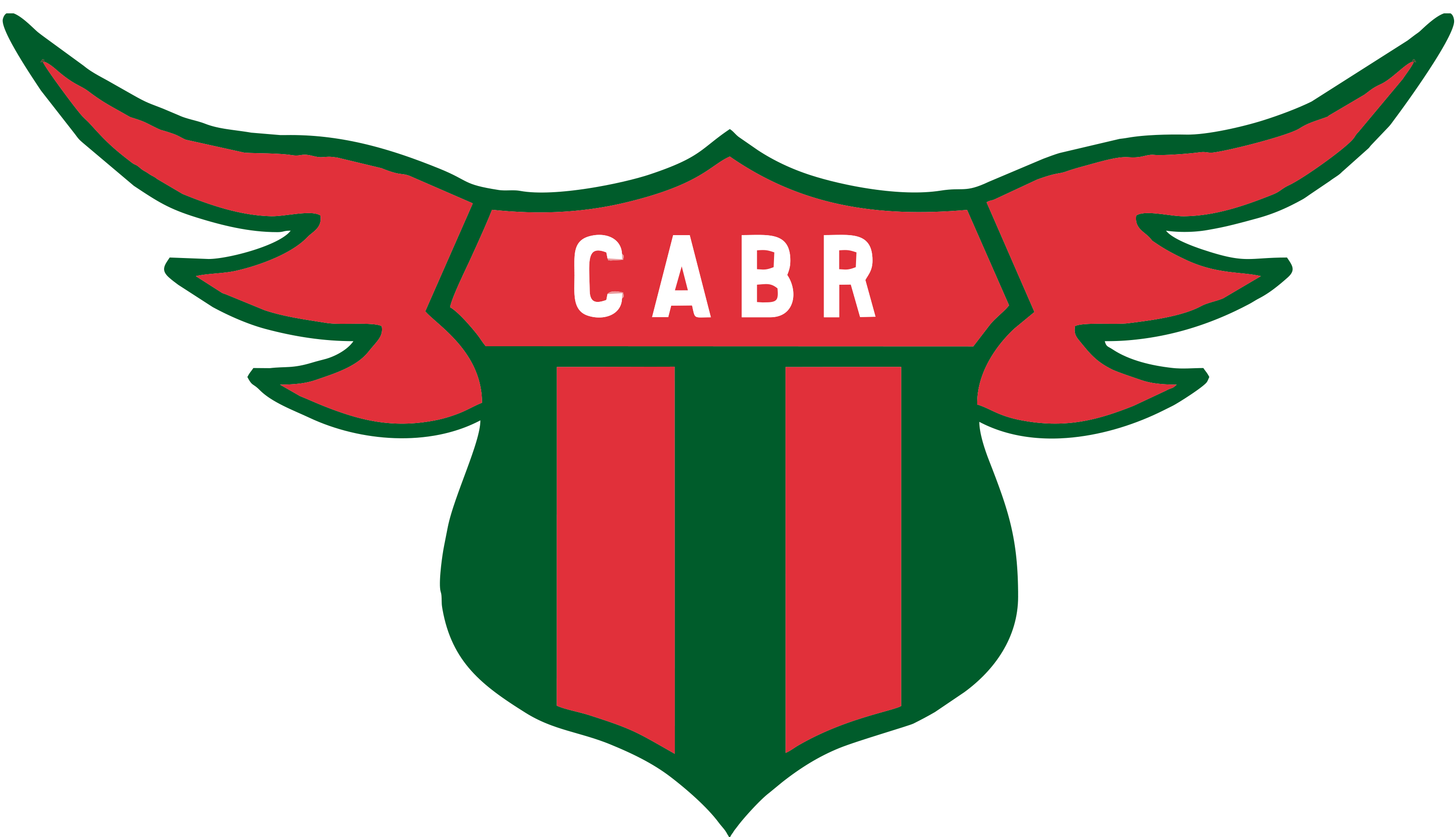
- Full name: Club Atlético Boston River
- Nicknames: El Boston; Verdirrojo ("Green and Red"); El sastre ("The Tailor")
- Founded: 20 February 1939; 87 years ago
- Ground: Estadio Pacific Campeones Olímpicos; Florida, Uruguay
- Capacity: 5,124
- Chairman: Sergio Pérez Lauro
- Coach: Israel Damonte
- League: Liga AUF Uruguaya
- 2025: Liga AUF Uruguaya, 6th of 16
- Website: bostonriveroficial.uy
Home colours	Away colours

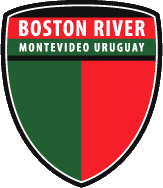
Another logo version.

Club Atlético Boston River, simply known as Boston River, is a Uruguayan sports club located in Montevideo. Founded on 20 February 1939, their football section is currently playing in the Uruguayan Primera División. At the futsal league of AUF, Boston River competes in the first division.

The club is named after a tailor shop owned by its founder, called "Sastrería Boston", and Argentine side River Plate.

== Players ==
=== Current squad ===
As of 22 March, 2026

Note: Flags indicate national team as defined under FIFA eligibility rules; some limited exceptions apply. Players may hold more than one non-FIFA nationality.

No.	Pos.	Nation	Player
1	GK	URU	Bruno Antúnez
2	DF	URU	Kevin Sotto
3	DF	URU	Marco Mancebo
5	MF	URU	Francisco Barrios
6	MF	VEN	Andrés Romero
7	FW	URU	Facundo Rodríguez
8	FW	ARG	Francisco Bonfiglio
9	FW	URU	Alexander González
10	MF	URU	Agustín Amado
11	MF	URU	Gastón Ramírez
12	GK	URU	Juan González
13	DF	URU	Ignacio Fernandez
14	MF	URU	Federico Dafonte
15	DF	URU	Lautaro Vázquez (on loan from Club Nacional)
16	MF	URU	Leandro Suhr
17	DF	URU	Rafael Haller (on loan from Club Nacional)

No.	Pos.	Nation	Player
18	FW	URU	Facundo Saldaña
19	DF	URU	Agustín Granja
20	FW	URU	Felipe Avenatti
21	FW	URU	Franco Pérez (on loan from Rentistas)
22	DF	URU	Fredy Martínez
23	DF	URU	Mateo Rivero
24	DF	URU	Jairo O'Neil
25	DF	ARG	Agustín Aguirre
26	MF	URU	Facundo Muñoa
28	FW	URU	Francisco Martinicorena
30	DF	URU	Martín González
31	DF	URU	Juan Acosta
32	MF	ARG	Yair González (on loan from Argentinos Juniors)
99	FW	ARG	Gonzalo Reyna (on loan from Racing Club)

=== Out on loan ===
Note: Flags indicate national team as defined under FIFA eligibility rules; some limited exceptions apply. Players may hold more than one non-FIFA nationality.

No.	Pos.	Nation	Player
—	DF	URU	Mauro Alfonso (at Unión San Felipe until 31 December 2025)
—	MF	URU	Martín Fernández (at Gil Vicente until 30 June 2026)
—	MF	URU	Pablo Furtado (at Tacuarembó until 31 December 2025)
—	MF	URU	Lucas Lemos (at CA River Plate until 31 December 2025)

No.	Pos.	Nation	Player
—	FW	VEN	Brayan Alcócer (at Deportivo La Guaira until 31 December 2025)
—	FW	URU	Emiliano Gómez (at Puebla)
—	FW	URU	Enzo Larrosa (at C.A. Cerro until 31 December 2025)

== Honours ==
=== Domestic ===
- Liga Metropolitana Amateur
  - Champions (1): 2006
- Divisional Extra A
  - Champions (1): 1956
- Divisional Extra B
  - Champions (1): 1954
