= Club Plaza Colonia de Deportes =

Uruguayan football club

Plaza Colonia
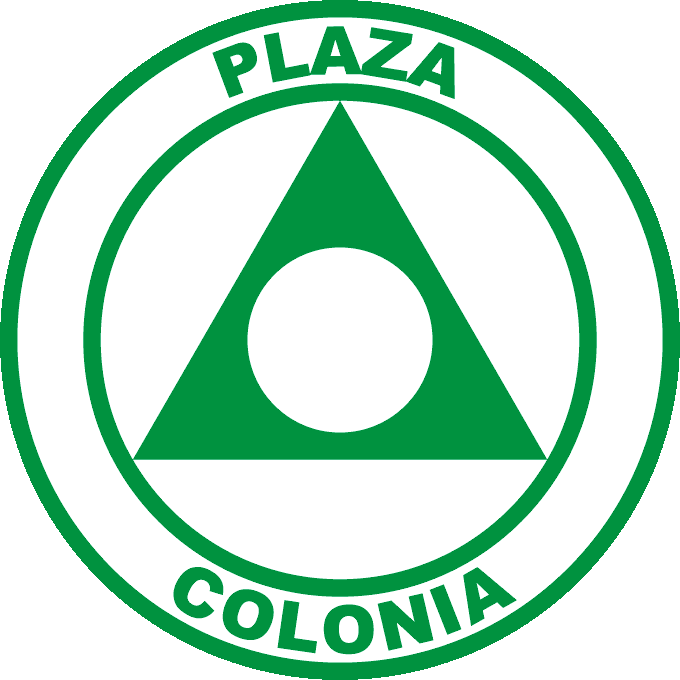
- Full name: Club Plaza de Deportes Colonia
- Nickname: Patas Blancas
- Founded: April 22, 1917; 109 years ago
- Ground: Estadio Juan Gaspar Prandi
- Capacity: 3,000
- Chairman: Rafael González
- Manager: Vacant
- League: Uruguayan Segunda División
- 2025: Liga AUF Uruguaya, 13th of 16 (relegated by average)
Home colours	Away colours

Club Plaza Colonia de Deportes, or simply Plaza Colonia, is a Uruguayan professional football club from Colonia del Sacramento, that competes in the Uruguayan Primera Division. Founded in 1917, the club plays its home games at the 3,000 seater Estadio Juan Gaspar Prandi.

== History ==
The club was founded on April 22, 1917 by Alberto Suppici. They played in the Regional league of Colonia until 1999. They gained their affiliation with AUF in 2000. In 2001 they won promotion to the Primera División Uruguaya and in their debut season they finished in 7th place.

In 2003 the club finally fell to the Second Division after a poor campaign. In 2004 the club was promoted back to the first division, but in 2005 they went back down after another poor campaign. In 2006 they did not play the championship because of financial difficulties.

They re-entered official competitions for the 2006–07 season, playing once more in the Uruguayan 2nd Division.

In May 2016 they won the Clausura Championship for the first time after defeating Peñarol 2–1. They became known as the "Leicester City of Uruguay" because of Leicester City's surprising 2015–16 Premier League title. The season before Plaza Colonia had finished 13th out of 16. In the championship playoff, played between the Apertura and Clausura champions to decide who would be the super champion, Peñarol defeated them 3–1 after extra time.

They qualified for their first ever continental competition in the 2016 Copa Sudamericana. Reports say that some players had never even been on a plane before. They lost to Club Blooming on penalties in the first stage.

In 2021, they won the Apertura tournament, their second accolade, and qualified for the Copa Libertadores for the first time in the club's history. On 7 December, they lost the championship playoff on penalties 8–7 after a 1–1 draw at the conclusion of extra time.

== Rivalries ==
Plaza's city rivals are Juventud Colonia, and department derby is against Deportivo Colonia.

== Honours ==
- Torneo Clausura
  - Winners (1): 2016 Clausura
- Torneo Apertura
  - Winners (1): 2021 Apertura
- Uruguayan Segunda División
  - Winners (1): 2024

== Current squad ==
As of 23 August, 2025

Note: Flags indicate national team as defined under FIFA eligibility rules; some limited exceptions apply. Players may hold more than one non-FIFA nationality.

No.	Pos.	Nation	Player
2	DF	URU	Máximo Lorenzi
3	MF	URU	Yvo Calleros
4	DF	URU	Haibrany Ruiz Díaz
6	MF	URU	Miqueas Redín
7	FW	ARG	Álvaro López
8	MF	URU	Diego Villalba
9	FW	BRA	Alex Bruno
10	FW	URU	Agustín Ocampo
11	FW	URU	Gonzalo Bueno
14	FW	URU	Hebert Vergara
16	DF	URU	Matías Velázquez

No.	Pos.	Nation	Player
17	DF	URU	Santiago Otegui
18	DF	URU	Ángel Cayetano
20	MF	URU	Ezequias Redín
21	DF	URU	Juan Pablo Hernández
22	DF	URU	Juan Ramos
23	MF	URU	Facundo Píriz
25	GK	URU	Joaquín Silva
27	MF	URU	Cristian Barros
35	GK	URU	Mariano Mendoza
44	GK	URU	Guillermo Reyes
80	FW	URU	Lucas Carrizo
