= 2023 Copa Uruguay =

Copa AUF Uruguay 2023

Tournament details
- Country: Uruguay
- Dates: 21 August 2023 – 22 May 2024
- Teams: 80

Final positions
- Champions: Defensor Sporting (2nd title)
- Runners-up: Montevideo City Torque

Tournament statistics
- Matches played: 79
- Goals scored: 194 (2.46 per match)
- Top goal scorer: Christian Alba (5 goals)

The 2023 Copa Uruguay (officially known as Copa AUF Uruguay 2023), was the second edition of the Copa Uruguay, the country's national football cup tournament. The tournament began on 21 August 2023 and had 80 teams participating. It was originally scheduled to end on 10 December 2023, but the tournament was paused at the round of 16 and resumed on 5 February 2024 due to a players strike in Uruguayan football, with the final match eventually moved to 22 May 2024.

The defending champions Defensor Sporting won their second title in the competition, defeating Montevideo City Torque in the final on penalty kicks following a 2–2 draw after 90 minutes.

== Format ==
The competition was divided into eight stages, with ties in all stages played over a single match. The preliminary round was contested by 24 clubs from the Organización del Fútbol del Interior (OFI), four Divisional D (fourth tier) clubs, and 20 teams from the Primera División Amateur, with 12 OFI clubs and 12 AUF ones advancing to the first round where the OFI clubs were drawn against the AUF ones, and matches were hosted by six OFI clubs and six AUF clubs. The 12 winners from the first round were joined by 12 teams from the Segunda División in the second round, except for Tacuarembó and Oriental, champion and runner-up of the previous Primera División Amateur season. The 12 first round winners hosted their match in this round, and the 12 winners moved into the third round.

32 teams played in the third round: 12 winners from the previous phase, 16 professional teams from the Primera División, the defending champion and runner-up of the Primera División Amateur and the defending champion and runner-up of the Copa Nacional de Clubes (Central and Universitario). The 16 Primera División clubs played their match in this round away. From this point onwards, the winners played against each other in single-legged knockout phases, with the semi-finals and the final to be played on neutral ground. The final was planned to be played at a stadium outside of Montevideo where no professional activity was held, unless it was played by Nacional and Peñarol, in which case it would be played at Estadio Centenario.

Starting from this edition, the winners of the competition were expected to qualify for the Supercopa Uruguaya. They were also awarded a US$ 120,000 prize to be spent on club infrastructure. The amateur club that advanced the furthest in the competition was awarded US$50,000 for the same purpose. OFI club Sportivo Barracas, which reached the quarter-finals of the competition, was eventually awarded that prize. These monetary prizes would not accumulate in the event an amateur club won the competition.

== Schedule ==
The schedule of the competition was as follows:

Round	Draw date	Dates
Preliminary round	16 August 2023	22 August – 9 September 2023
First round	16 August 2023	16–21 September 2023
Second round	16 August 2023	11–19 October 2023
Third round	16 August 2023	26 October – 7 November 2023
Round of 16	16 August 2023	16 December 2023 – 28 February 2024
Quarter-finals	16 August 2023	12 February – 13 March 2024
Semi-finals	16 August 2023	10–17 April 2024
Finals	16 August 2023	22 May 2024

== Qualified teams ==
The following teams entered the competition. Primera División Amateur teams Artigas, Deportivo Colonia, Huracán, and Mar de Fondo declined to participate.

Primera División; All 16 teams of the 2023 season	Segunda División; All 14 teams of the 2023 season	Primera División Amateur; 20 teams of the 2023 season	Divisional D 4 teams of the 2023 season	OFI; 24 Serie A teams and 2 Serie B teams of the 2023 season
Boston River; Cerro; Cerro Largo; Danubio; Defensor Sporting; Deportivo Maldonado; Fénix; La Luz; Liverpool; Montevideo City Torque; Montevideo Wanderers; Nacional; Peñarol; Plaza Colonia; Racing; River Plate	Albion; Atenas; Bella Vista; Cerrito; Juventud; Miramar Misiones; Oriental; Potencia; Progreso; Rampla Juniors; Rentistas; Sud América; Tacuarembó; Uruguay Montevideo	Alto Perú; Basáñez; Bella Italia; Canadian; Central Español; Colón; Cooper; Deportivo Italiano; Durazno; Huracán Buceo; Los Halcones; Parque del Plata; Paysandú; Platense; Rocha; Salto; Salus; Terremoto; Villa Española; Villa Teresa	Deutscher; Estudiantes del Plata; Lito; Paso de la Arena	Barrio Olímpico; Bella Vista (Paysandú); Boquita; Campana; Central; Ferro Carril; Huracán (Paysandú); Huracán (Treinta y Tres); Ituzaingó; Juanicó; Juventud (Colonia); Juventud Unida; Laureles; Lavalleja (Minas); Libertad; Litoral; Nacional (Nueva Helvecia); Piriápolis; Progreso (Estación Atlántida); Quilmes; Río Negro; Sportivo Barracas; Universitario; Wanderers (Durazno); Wanderers (Santa Lucía); Wanderers Juvenil

== Draw ==
The draw of the competition was held on 16 August 2023, at the Artigas Theater in Trinidad, Flores Department. The preliminary round was divided into two zones: in the AUF zone, teams playing in the third and fourth tier were drawn against each other into 12 ties, whilst in the OFI zone, the 24 teams entering were also divided into four zones according to geographical criteria: Litoral, Central/South, Central/East, and East, and then drawn against a team in their geographical zone.

== Preliminary stage ==
=== AUF Zone ===
21 August 2023	Durazno	1–2	Cooper	Montevideo
10:00 UTC−3	Pereira 87'	Report	Vignone 33' (pen.); Silveira 90+1' (pen.)	Stadium: Parque Palermo; Referee: Juan Cianni

21 August 2023	Platense	0–0 (2–4 p)	Villa Española	Montevideo
10:30 UTC−3		Report		Stadium: Complejo Rentistas; Referee: Kevin Fontes

21 August 2023	Basáñez	1–0	Deportivo Italiano	Montevideo
15:00 UTC−3	Da Silva 83'	Report		Stadium: Complejo Rentistas; Referee: Federico Modernel

21 August 2023	Bella Italia	0–1	Colón	Montevideo
19:00 UTC−3		Report	Cabrera 32'	Stadium: Parque Palermo; Referee: Gonzalo Pérez

22 August 2023	Canadian	1–1 (3–4 p)	Central Español	Montevideo
13:30 UTC−3	Colla 34'	Report	García 90+2'	Stadium: Parque Palermo; Referee: Rubén Umpiérrez

22 August 2023	Salto	1–0	Paysandú	Salto
17:00 UTC−3	Vera 90+9'	Report		Stadium: Juan José Vispo Mari; Referee: Adrián Pereira

23 August 2023	Lito	3–1	Paso de la Arena	Montevideo
20:00 UTC−3	López 62', 69'; Rodríguez 90+2'		Álvarez 47'	Stadium: Complejo Rentistas; Referee: Felipe Vikonis

24 August 2023	Terremoto	2–0	Alto Perú	Montevideo
9:00 UTC−3	Del Castillo; Olivera			Stadium: Parque Palermo; Referee: Sebastián González

24 August 2023	Huracán Buceo	1–1 (7–6 p)	Villa Teresa	Montevideo
15:00 UTC−3	Charrie		González	Stadium: Parque Huracán; Referee: Martín Grecco

24 August 2023	Salus	1–0	Parque del Plata	Montevideo
15:00 UTC−3	Sánchez			Stadium: Parque ANCAP; Referee: Pablo Silveira

24 August 2023	Deutscher	4–1	Los Halcones	Montevideo
20:00 UTC−3	Laport; Rivero; Bianchi			Stadium: Complejo Rentistas; Referee: Aníbal Vogrincic

30 August 2023	Rocha	2–0	Estudiantes del Plata	Rocha
19:00 UTC−3	Resquini 60'; Suárez 87' (pen.)	Report		Stadium: Mario Sobrero; Referee: Ignacio González

=== OFI Zone ===
29 August 2023	Barrio Olímpico	2–2 (3–5 p)	Huracán (Treinta y Tres)	Minas
21:00 UTC−3	Chaine 27', 46'		Suárez 52'; Chape 59'	Stadium: Walter Montero; Referee: Marcelo Palacios

30 August 2023	Lavalleja (Minas)	3–1	Piriápolis	Minas
20:00 UTC−3	Martínez; Fernández	Report		Stadium: Juan Antonio Lavalleja; Referee: Jonathan Ramos

30 August 2023	Sportivo Barracas	2–0	Huracán (Paysandú)	Dolores
20:30 UTC−3	Bonti; Planchón	Report		Stadium: Eduardo Luis Piazze; Referee: Marcos Beltrán

30 August 2023	Ferro Carril	5–1	Laureles	Salto
21:00 UTC−3	Silveira; Cabrera; Tabarez; Quinteros	Report	Pelletti	Stadium: Ernesto Dickinson; Referee: Matías Schneider

30 August 2023	Juventud (Colonia)	1–0	Wanderers (Santa Lucía)	Colonia del Sacramento
21:00 UTC−3	Lemos	Report		Stadium: Juventud; Referee: Fernando Martínez

30 August 2023	Juanicó	1–0	Boquita	Florida
21:00 UTC−3	Moreno	Report		Stadium: Campeones Olímpicos; Referee: Cristian Bouvier

3 September 2023	Wanderers Juvenil	1–4	Wanderers (Durazno)	Tacuarembó
15:30 UTC−3	A. González		Sánchez; Olivera; Moraes; J. González	Stadium: Raúl Goyenola; Referee: Fernando Martínez

5 September 2023	Río Negro	2–2 (3–4 p)	Campana	San José de Mayo
20:30 UTC−3	Castro; Cardozo		Gaspari; Alayón	Stadium: Casto Martínez Laguarda; Referee: Sebastián Montenegro

6 September 2023	Ituzaingó	1–1 (2–3 p)	Libertad	Maldonado
19:00 UTC−3	Balao		Tavares	Stadium: Domingo Burgueño Miguel; Referee: Sebastián Montenegro

7 September 2023	Juventud Unida	0–1	Nacional (Nueva Helvecia)	Libertad
20:30 UTC−3			Boné	Stadium: Primero de Mayo; Referee: Marcelo Palacios

9 September 2023	Quilmes	3–0	Progreso (Estación Atlántida)	Florida
19:00 UTC−3	Alba; Monzón			Stadium: Campeones Olímpicos; Referee: Néstor Pereyra

9 September 2023	Bella Vista (Paysandú)	1–1 (4–2 p)	Litoral	Paysandú
20:30 UTC−3	Gentile		Guimaraens	Stadium: Parque Artigas; Referee: Sergio Liuzzi

== First round ==
16 September 2023	Wanderers (Durazno)	0–2	Terremoto	Durazno
15:30 UTC−3			Lugo; Texeira	Stadium: Silvestre Octavio Landoni; Referee: Sergio Liuzzi

17 September 2023	Huracán Buceo	1–1 (2–4 p)	Ferro Carril	Montevideo
15:30 UTC−3	Núñez		Tabárez	Stadium: Parque Huracán; Referee: Augusto Olmos

19 September 2023	Cooper	0–0 (2–4 p)	Libertad	Montevideo
20:00 UTC−3		Report		Stadium: Complejo Rentistas; Referee: Federico Río

19 September 2023	Colón	1–1 (5–4 p)	Bella Vista (Paysandú)	Montevideo
22:30 UTC−3	Villalba	Report	Lima	Stadium: Parque Palermo; Referee: Mathías Espinosa

20 September 2023	Juventud (Colonia)	1–1 (4–3 p)	Salto	Colonia del Sacramento
20:30 UTC−3	Noy	Report	Sagradini	Stadium: Juventud; Referee: Matías Schneider

20 September 2023	Campana	1–1 (3–4 p)	Basáñez	Libertad
20:30 UTC−3	Delgado	Report	Farinasso	Stadium: Adelaido Camaití; Referee: Jonathan Ramos

20 September 2023	Deutscher	0–1	Sportivo Barracas	Montevideo
20:30 UTC−3		Report	Castillo	Stadium: Complejo Rentistas; Referee: Carlos Garcilazo

20 September 2023	Huracán (Treinta y Tres)	0–1	Lito	Treinta y Tres
21:00 UTC−3		Report	López	Stadium: Parque Colón; Referee: Néstor Pereyra

20 September 2023	Quilmes	2–1	Central Español	Florida
21:00 UTC−3	Alba	Report	Caicedo	Stadium: Campeones Olímpicos; Referee: Sebastián Montenegro

21 September 2023	Lavalleja (Minas)	Awarded	Rocha	Minas
20:30 UTC−3				Stadium: Juan Antonio Lavalleja; Referee: Fernando Martínez
Note: Match awarded to Lavalleja (Minas) after Rocha declined to play due to a lack of rest days.

21 September 2023	Nacional (Nueva Helvecia)	1–1 (5–4 p)	Villa Española	Nueva Helvecia
20:30 UTC−3	Boné		Acevedo	Stadium: Nacional de Nueva Helvecia; Referee: Marcos Beltrán

21 September 2023	Salus	0–4	Juanicó	Montevideo
22:00 UTC−3			Souza; Álvarez; Rossi; Moreno	Stadium: Parque Palermo; Referee: Javier González

== Second round ==
11 October 2023	Terremoto	1–2	Miramar Misiones	Montevideo
11:00 UTC−3	Lugo	Report	Olivera; Cordara	Stadium: Parque Palermo; Referee: Eduardo Varela

11 October 2023	Basáñez	0–1	Cerrito	Montevideo
18:00 UTC−3		Report	Rey	Stadium: Parque Palermo; Referee: Federico Arman

11 October 2023	Ferro Carril	0–0 (4–3 p)	Bella Vista	Salto
20:00 UTC−3		Report		Stadium: Ernesto Dickinson; Referee: Andrés Martínez

11 October 2023	Juventud (Colonia)	0–5	Albion	Colonia del Sacramento
20:30 UTC−3		Report	Alvite; Barreto; Villalpando; Piegas; Sánchez	Stadium: Profesor Alberto Suppici; Referee: Nicolás Vignolo

12 October 2023	Lito	0–2	Sud América	Montevideo
21:00 UTC−3		Report	Píriz 87'; Sánchez 90+2'	Stadium: Complejo Rentistas; Referee: Diego Dunajec

18 October 2023	Colón	2–2 (5–6 p)	Potencia	Montevideo
15:00 UTC−3	Mautone 61'; Villalba 88'	Report	Cutti 56' (pen.); Lerman 90+4'	Stadium: Parque Palermo; Referee: Nicolás Varela

18 October 2023	Quilmes	1–1 (6–7 p)	Rampla Juniors	Florida
20:00 UTC−3	Alba	Report	Vila	Stadium: Campeones Olímpicos; Referee: Daniel Rodríguez

18 October 2023	Libertad	0–2	Uruguay Montevideo	Rocha
20:30 UTC−3		Report	Sena; Noble	Stadium: Mario Sobrero; Referee: Esteban Guerra

18 October 2023	Sportivo Barracas	1–1 (6–5 p)	Rentistas	Dolores
20:30 UTC−3	Cabral	Report	Berríos	Stadium: Eduardo Luis Piazze; Referee: Diego Riveiro

18 October 2023	Lavalleja (Minas)	1–1 (3–1 p)	Juventud	Minas
20:30 UTC−3	Berrueta	Report	Falconis	Stadium: Juan Antonio Lavalleja; Referee: Santiago Motta

19 October 2023	Nacional (Nueva Helvecia)	1–2	Progreso	Nueva Helvecia
20:30 UTC−3	Alfonso	Report	Rodríguez; Mallet	Stadium: Nacional de Nueva Helvecia; Referee: Hernán Heras

19 October 2023	Juanicó	1–1 (2–4 p)	Atenas	Juanicó
20:30 UTC−3	Álvarez	Report	Mascaraña	Stadium: Gloria de un Pueblo; Referee: Pablo Giménez

== Bracket ==
Third round
Ferro Carril	0 (3)
Cerro (p)	0 (5)
Tacuarembó	1
Fénix	2
Miramar Misiones	0 (3)
Montevideo Wanderers (p)	0 (5)
Albion	0
River Plate	2
Uruguay Montevideo	1
Plaza Colonia	2
Cerrito	0
Defensor Sporting	3
Rampla Juniors	2 (6)
La Luz (p)	2 (7)
Lavalleja (Minas)	1
Danubio	3
Sud América	0
Peñarol	3
Universitario	1
Boston River	3
Atenas	2 (3)
Liverpool (p)	2 (4)
Potencia	0
Nacional	4
Progreso	1 (0)
Montevideo City Torque (p)	1 (1)
Central	0 (3)
Deportivo Maldonado (p)	0 (5)
Sportivo Barracas	3
Cerro Largo	2
Oriental	1
Racing	0

Round of 16
Cerro (p)	1 (3)
Fénix	1 (2)
Montevideo Wanderers	0
River Plate	4
Plaza Colonia	0
Defensor Sporting	1
La Luz	0
Danubio	1
Peñarol	2
Boston River	0
Liverpool	2
Nacional	1
Montevideo City Torque	2
Deportivo Maldonado	0
Sportivo Barracas (p)	1 (5)
Oriental	1 (4)

Quarter-finals
Cerro	1 (4)
River Plate (p)	1 (5)
Defensor Sporting	1
Danubio	0
Peñarol	3
Liverpool	1
Montevideo City Torque	8
Sportivo Barracas	1

Semi-finals
River Plate	1
Defensor Sporting	2
Peñarol	1
Montevideo City Torque	3

Final
Defensor Sporting (p)	2 (4)
Montevideo City Torque	2 (2)

== Third round ==
26 October 2023	Central	0–0 (3–5 p)	Deportivo Maldonado	San José de Mayo
20:00 UTC−3		Report		Stadium: Casto Martínez Laguarda; Referee: Federico Arman

28 October 2023	Lavalleja (Minas)	1–3	Danubio	Minas
20:00 UTC−3	Vázquez	Report	Etchebarne; Bueno; Branda	Stadium: Juan Antonio Lavalleja; Referee: Diego Riveiro

28 October 2023	Universitario	1–3	Boston River	Salto
20:00 UTC−3	Llama	Report	Rodríguez; Riasco	Stadium: Ernesto Dickinson; Referee: Daniel Fedorczuk

29 October 2023	Albion	0–2	River Plate	Montevideo
16:00 UTC−3		Report	Barone; López	Stadium: Luis Franzini; Referee: Pablo Giménez

29 October 2023	Rampla Juniors	2–2 (6–7 p)	La Luz	Montevideo
16:00 UTC−3	Leites; Burruzo	Report	Scorza; Martirena	Stadium: Olímpico; Referee: Antonio García

29 October 2023	Progreso	1–1 (0–1 p)	Montevideo City Torque	Montevideo
16:00 UTC−3	Rosso	Report	Catarozzi	Stadium: Abraham Paladino; Referee: Yimmy Álvarez

29 October 2023	Sud América	0–3	Peñarol	Paysandú
16:30 UTC−3		Report	Sánchez 44'; Mansilla 46'; Méndez 60'	Stadium: Parque Artigas; Referee: Santiago Motta

29 October 2023	Sportivo Barracas	3–2	Cerro Largo	Dolores
16:30 UTC−3	Orona 24'; Cabral 62'; Nadal 64'	Report	Fernández 36'; Núñez	Stadium: Eduardo Luis Piazze; Referee: Bruno Sacarelo

29 October 2023	Tacuarembó	1–2	Fénix	Tacuarembó
19:00 UTC−3	Viana	Report	Ferreira	Stadium: Raúl Goyenola; Referee: Nicolás Vignolo

29 October 2023	Potencia	0–4	Nacional	Montevideo
19:15 UTC−3		Report	Fagúndez 47', 62'; Ramírez 69' (pen.), 72'	Stadium: Parque Alfredo Víctor Viera; Referee: Esteban Guerra

29 October 2023	Cerrito	0–3	Defensor Sporting	Montevideo
21:00 UTC−3		Report	Jorge; Ramírez; Duarte	Stadium: Parque Palermo; Referee: Leandro Lasso

30 October 2023	Miramar Misiones	0–0 (3–5 p)	Montevideo Wanderers	Montevideo
12:00 UTC−3		Report		Stadium: Parque Palermo; Referee: Andrés Martínez

30 October 2023	Uruguay Montevideo	1–2	Plaza Colonia	Montevideo
16:00 UTC−3	Alonso	Report	Daniel Bahia; Dibble	Stadium: Parque Capurro; Referee: Anahí Fernández

30 October 2023	Oriental	1–0	Racing	Montevideo
16:00 UTC−3	Antúnez	Report		Stadium: Parque Osvaldo Roberto; Referee: Eduardo Varela

6 November 2023	Atenas	2–2 (3–4 p)	Liverpool	Montevideo
21:00 UTC−3	Ovelar 9', 55'	Report	Bentancourt 17'; Trinidad 81'	Stadium: Parque Palermo; Referee: Diego Dunajec

7 November 2023	Ferro Carril	0–0 (3–5 p)	Cerro	Salto
20:00 UTC−3		Report		Stadium: Ernesto Dickinson; Referee: Daniel Rodríguez

== Round of 16 ==
16 December 2023	Sportivo Barracas	1–1 (5–4 p)	Oriental	Dolores
17:00 UTC−3	Otazu	Report	Moreira	Stadium: Eduardo Luis Piazze; Referee: Leandro Lasso

5 February 2024	Peñarol	2–0	Boston River	Montevideo
20:30 UTC−3	Darias 50'; Acosta 67'	Report		Stadium: Campeón del Siglo; Referee: Hernán Heras

6 February 2024	Liverpool	2–1	Nacional	Montevideo
17:30 UTC−3	Romero 16' (o.g.); Nicola 73'	Report	Bentancourt 58' (pen.)	Stadium: Belvedere; Referee: Santiago Motta

7 February 2024	Montevideo Wanderers	0–4	River Plate	Montevideo
20:30 UTC−3		Report	González 21'; Correa 64'; Vera 76'; Amoroso 82'	Stadium: Parque Alfredo Víctor Viera; Referee: Bruno Sacarelo

8 February 2024	Montevideo City Torque	2–0	Deportivo Maldonado	Montevideo
20:30 UTC−3	Zeballos 6'; Acosta 90+4'	Report		Stadium: Parque Alfredo Víctor Viera; Referee: Esteban Guerra

20 February 2024	La Luz	0–1	Danubio	Montevideo
17:00 UTC−3		Report	Pintos 89'	Stadium: Parque Palermo; Referee: Daniel Rodríguez

21 February 2024	Cerro	1–1 (3–2 p)	Fénix	Montevideo
21:00 UTC−3	Rabuñal 71'	Report	Guisolfo 64'	Stadium: Luis Tróccoli; Referee: Federico Arman
	Penalties
	Pereira (penalty missed); Peralta Bauer (penalty scored); Macelli (penalty missed); Romero (penalty scored); Villar (penalty scored)		Juambeltz (penalty missed); Queiroz (penalty scored); Franca (penalty missed); Da Silva (penalty scored); Acuña (penalty missed)

28 February 2024	Plaza Colonia	0–1	Defensor Sporting	Colonia del Sacramento
21:00 UTC−3		Report	Elizari 33'	Stadium: Parque Juan Prandi; Referee: Eduardo Varela

== Quarter-finals ==
12 February 2024	Peñarol	3–1	Liverpool	Montevideo
20:30 UTC−3	Fernández 43', 69' (pen.), 90+6' (pen.)	Report	L. Rodríguez 31'	Stadium: Campeón del Siglo; Referee: Pablo Giménez

6 March 2024	Cerro	1–1 (4–5 p)	River Plate	Montevideo
17:00 UTC−3	Marín 46'	Report	Amoroso 55'	Stadium: Luis Tróccoli; Referee: Jonathan Fuentes
	Penalties
	N. González (penalty missed); Abero (penalty scored); Rabuñal (penalty scored); Peralta Bauer (penalty scored); Pereira (penalty scored); Álvarez (penalty missed)		(penalty scored) Vera; (penalty scored) Almeida; (penalty missed) Rodríguez; (penalty scored) Cristóbal; (penalty scored) Corbo; (penalty scored) Correa

11 March 2024	Montevideo City Torque	8–1	Sportivo Barracas	Montevideo
20:30 UTC−3	Ortegón 8'; Catarozzi 18'; Pizzichillo 34'; Rodríguez Trezza 40', 80', 86'; Núñez 55'; Zeballos 73'	Report	Cabral 45+2'	Stadium: Luis Franzini; Referee: Andrés Martínez

13 March 2024	Defensor Sporting	1–0	Danubio	Montevideo
20:30 UTC−3	Guerrero 90'	Report		Stadium: Luis Franzini; Referee: Hernán Heras

== Semi-finals ==
10 April 2024	River Plate	1–2	Defensor Sporting	Montevideo
19:00 UTC−3	Lavega 6' (pen.)	Report	De los Santos 41'; Viacava 61'	Stadium: Parque Alfredo Víctor Viera; Referee: Santiago Motta

17 April 2024	Peñarol	1–3	Montevideo City Torque	Montevideo
20:30 UTC−3	Milans 45'	Report	Obregón 10'; Pizzichillo 42' (pen.); Rodríguez Trezza 58'	Stadium: Centenario; Referee: Leandro Lasso

== Final ==
22 May 2024
20:30 UTC−3

Defensor Sporting	2–2	Montevideo City Torque
Rivero 43'; Wunsch 82'	Report	Teuten 5'; Zeballos 52'
Penalties
Rivero (penalty scored); Duarte (penalty scored); Giampaoli (penalty scored); N. Rodríguez (penalty scored)	4–2	(penalty scored) Catarozzi; (penalty missed) Villa; (penalty scored) Pizzichillo; (penalty missed) Teuten

Estadio Centenario, Montevideo
Attendance: 2,500
Referee: Hernán Heras

== Top scorers ==
Rank	Player	Club	Goals
1	(Uruguay) Christian Alba	Quilmes	5
2	(Uruguay) Natanael Tabárez	Ferro Carril	3
2	(Uruguay) Sebastián López	Lito	3
4	13 players		2

Source: AUF

== See also ==
- 2023 Uruguayan Primera División season
- 2023 Uruguayan Segunda División season
