= List of football clubs in Uruguay =

This is a list of football (soccer) clubs in Uruguay.

== List of AUF-members clubs ==
Name	Level	City	Department
Albion	3	Montevideo	Montevideo
Alto Perú	3	Montevideo	Montevideo
Atenas	2	San Carlos	Maldonado
Basañez	3	Montevideo	Montevideo
Bella Vista	2	Montevideo	Montevideo
Boston River	1	Montevideo	Montevideo
Canadian	2	Montevideo	Montevideo
Central Español	2	Montevideo	Montevideo
Cerrito	2	Montevideo	Montevideo
Cerro	1	Montevideo	Montevideo
Cerro Largo	2	Melo	Cerro Largo
Colón F.C.	3	Montevideo	Montevideo
Danubio	1	Montevideo	Montevideo
Defensor Sporting	1	Montevideo	Montevideo
Deportivo Maldonado	2	Maldonado	Maldonado
El Tanque Sisley	2	Montevideo	Montevideo
Fénix	1	Montevideo	Montevideo
Huracán	2	Montevideo	Montevideo
Juventud Las Piedras	1	Las Piedras	Canelones
La Luz	3	Montevideo	Montevideo
Liverpool	1	Montevideo	Montevideo
Mar de Fondo	3	Montevideo	Montevideo
Miramar Misiones	2	Montevideo	Montevideo
Montevideo Wanderers	1	Montevideo	Montevideo
Nacional	1	Montevideo	Montevideo
Oriental	2	La Paz	Montevideo
Peñarol	1	Montevideo	Montevideo
Platense	3	Montevideo	Montevideo
Plaza Colonia	1	Colonia del Sacramento	Colonia
Potencia	3	Montevideo	Montevideo
Progreso	2	Montevideo	Montevideo
Racing	1	Montevideo	Montevideo
Rampla Juniors	1	Montevideo	Montevideo
Rentistas	2	Montevideo	Montevideo
River Plate	1	Montevideo	Montevideo
Rocha	2	Rocha	Rocha
Sud América	1	Montevideo	Montevideo
Tacuarembó	2	Tacuarembó	Tacuarembó
Torque	2	Montevideo	Montevideo
Uruguay Montevideo	3	Montevideo	Montevideo
Villa Española	1	Montevideo	Montevideo
Villa Teresa	2	Montevideo	Montevideo

Levels:

1. - Uruguayan Primera División
2. - Segunda División Profesional
3. - Segunda División Amateur

== Other clubs ==
- Deportivo Colonia
- Frontera Rivera
- Huracán Buceo
- Paysandú
- Paysandú Bella Vista
- Quilmes
- Salto
- Salus
- Universidad Mayor
