= 2012–13 Uruguayan Segunda División Amateur season =

Segunda División
- Season: 2012–13

The 2012–13 Uruguayan Segunda División is the season of second division professional of football in Uruguay. A total of 12 teams will compete; the champion team is promoted to the Uruguayan Segunda División.

== Club information ==
Locations of the 2011−12 season teams.

Club	City	Stadium
Albion	Montevideo	Parque Dr. Enrique Falco Lichtemberger
Alto Perú	Montevideo	Parque Huracán Buceo
Basañez	Montevideo	La Bombonera
Canadian	Montevideo	Parque ANCAP
Colón	Montevideo	Parque Dr. Carlos Suero
La Luz	Montevideo	Parque Luis Rivero
Mar de Fondo	Montevideo	Parque Pedro Ángel Bossio
Oriental	La Paz	Parque Oriental
Platense	Montevideo	La Bombonera
Potencia	Montevideo	Parque 13 de Febrero
Salus	Montevideo	Parque Salus
Uruguay Montevideo	Montevideo	Parque ANCAP

== Torneo Apertura ==
=== Standings ===
Pos	Team	Pld	W	D	L	GF	GA	GD	Pts	Qualification
1	Albion	0	0	0	0	0	0	0	0	Championship Playoffs
2	Alto Perú	0	0	0	0	0	0	0	0	
3	Basañez	0	0	0	0	0	0	0	0	
4	Canadian	0	0	0	0	0	0	0	0	
5	Colón	0	0	0	0	0	0	0	0	
6	La Luz	0	0	0	0	0	0	0	0	
7	Mar de Fondo	0	0	0	0	0	0	0	0	
8	Oriental	0	0	0	0	0	0	0	0	
9	Platense	0	0	0	0	0	0	0	0	
10	Potencia	0	0	0	0	0	0	0	0	
11	Salus	0	0	0	0	0	0	0	0	
12	Uruguay Montevideo	0	0	0	0	0	0	0	0	

Updated to match(es) played on 26 May 2012. Source: Soccerway
Rules for classification: 1st points; 2nd goal difference; 3rd goals scored; 4th head-to-head points; 5th head-to-head goal difference; 6th head-to-head goals scored. This does not apply to determining the champion. If two or more teams had been tied in point at the end of the tournament, a playoff would have been held at a neutral venue within 72 hours for the championship

== Torneo Clausura ==
=== Standings ===
Pos	Team	Pld	W	D	L	GF	GA	GD	Pts	Qualification
1	Albion	0	0	0	0	0	0	0	0	Championship Playoffs
2	Alto Perú	0	0	0	0	0	0	0	0	
3	Basañez	0	0	0	0	0	0	0	0	
4	Canadian	0	0	0	0	0	0	0	0	
5	Colón	0	0	0	0	0	0	0	0	
6	La Luz	0	0	0	0	0	0	0	0	
7	Mar de Fondo	0	0	0	0	0	0	0	0	
8	Oriental	0	0	0	0	0	0	0	0	
9	Platense	0	0	0	0	0	0	0	0	
10	Potencia	0	0	0	0	0	0	0	0	
11	Salus	0	0	0	0	0	0	0	0	
12	Uruguay Montevideo	0	0	0	0	0	0	0	0	

Updated to match(es) played on 26 May 2012. Source: Soccerway
Rules for classification: 1st points; 2nd goal difference; 3rd goals scored; 4th head-to-head points; 5th head-to-head goal difference; 6th head-to-head goals scored. This does not apply to determining the champion. If two or more teams had been tied in point at the end of the tournament, a playoff would have been held at a neutral venue within 72 hours for the championship

== Aggregate table ==
=== Standings ===
Pos	Team	Pld	W	D	L	GF	GA	GD	Pts
1	Albion	0	0	0	0	0	0	0	0
2	Alto Perú	0	0	0	0	0	0	0	0
3	Basañez	0	0	0	0	0	0	0	0
4	Canadian	0	0	0	0	0	0	0	0
5	Colón	0	0	0	0	0	0	0	0
6	La Luz	0	0	0	0	0	0	0	0
7	Mar de Fondo	0	0	0	0	0	0	0	0
8	Oriental	0	0	0	0	0	0	0	0
9	Platense	0	0	0	0	0	0	0	0
10	Potencia	0	0	0	0	0	0	0	0
11	Salus	0	0	0	0	0	0	0	0
12	Uruguay Montevideo	0	0	0	0	0	0	0	0

Updated to match(es) played on 26 May 2012. Source: Soccerway
Rules for classification: 1st points; 2nd goal difference; 3rd goals scored; 4th head-to-head points; 5th head-to-head goal difference; 6th head-to-head goals scored. This does not apply to determining the champion. If two or more teams had been tied in point at the end of the tournament, a playoff would have been held at a neutral venue within 72 hours for the championship

== See also ==
- 2012–13 in Uruguayan football
