= Uruguayan football league system =

The Uruguayan football league system is a series of interconnected football leagues for clubs in Uruguay, and is organized by the Uruguayan Football Association at the national level. The Uruguayan League is organized by the Uruguayan Football Association, both in male and female football. The First Championship of Uruguayan Primera Division was played in 1900. Since that tournament until 2017, 114 championships of Uruguayan League were played (from 1900 to 1931 all were played in an amateur way, and from 1932 professionally).

Additionally, there are championships in Uruguay that are organized by other associations, of an amateur character.

== Uruguayan Primera División ==
The Uruguayan Primera División, called Torneo Uruguayo Copa Coca-Cola for publicity, is regarded as the 23rd most difficult football league in the 21st century by the International Federation of Football History & Statistics.

== Pyramid table ==
Level	League(s)/Division(s)
	Professional leagues
1	Primera División (Campeonato Uruguayo Copa Coca-Cola); 16 teams
	↓↑ 3 teams
2	Segunda División (Segunda División Profesional); 14 teams
	↓↑ 2 teams
	Semi-professional or amateur leagues
3	Primera División Amateur; 24 teams
	↓ 0 teams ↑ 1 team
4	Liga Metropolitana Amateur; 13 clubs
	↓↑ 1 team
	Disaffiliation for one season

=== Teams participating ===
The following is a list of the teams participating in the tournament.

Primera División Profesional
- Club Atlético Boston River
- Club Atlético Cerro
- Cerro Largo Fútbol Club
- Danubio Fútbol Club
- Defensor Sporting Club
- Club Deportivo Maldonado
- Centro Atlético Fénix
- Liverpool Fútbol Club
- Montevideo City Torque
- Club Nacional de Football
- Club Atlético Peñarol
- Club Plaza Colonia de Deportes
- Club Atlético Progreso
- Club Atlético Rentistas
- Club Atlético River Plate
- Montevideo Wanderers Fútbol Club
Segunda División Profesional
- Albion Football Club
- Club Atlético Atenas
- Central Español Fútbol Club
- Club Sportivo Cerrito
- Club Atlético Juventud
- Racing Club de Montevideo
- Rampla Juniors Fútbol Club
- Rocha Fútbol Club
- Institución Atlética Sud América
- Tacuarembó Fútbol Club
- C.S.D. Villa Española
- Club Atlético Villa Teresa
Primera División Amateur
- Club Atlético Alto Perú
- Club Atlético Artigas
- Club Atlético Basáñez
- C.A. Bella Vista
- Canadian Keguay
- Colón Fútbol Club
- Centro Cultural y Deportivo El Tanque Sisley
- Huracán Fútbol Club
- Huracán Buceo
- La Luz F.C.
- Club Social y Deportivo Los Halcones
- Mar de Fondo Fútbol Club
- Club Sportivo Miramar Misiones
- Club Oriental de Football
- Club Deportivo Parque del Plata
- Club Atlético Platense
- Institución Atlética Potencia
- Salus Football Club
- Uruguay Montevideo Football Club
Segunda División Amateur Metropolitana
- Club Atlético Cinco Esquinas de Pando
- Club Social y Deportivo Cooper
- Deutscher Fussbal Klub
- Club Social y Deportivo Keguay
- Hacele un Gol a la Vida
- Club Social y Deportivo Paso de la Arena
- Rincón de Carrasco
- Club Atlético Unión de San José

== Uruguayan championship of women's football ==
The Uruguayan championship of women's football is the most important national tournament corresponding to the female branch of Uruguayan football, and is organized by the Uruguayan Football Association since 1997 from a FIFA request.

=== League System ===
The Uruguayan female championship has distributed teams in three categories.

Level	Division(s)/League(s)
1	Primera División; 9 clubs
	? ↓ ↑ ? clubs
2	Segunda División; 9 clubs
	? ↓↑ 1 clubs
3	Tercera División; 7 clubs

=== Teams participating ===
The following is a list of the teams participating in the 2019 tournament.

Divisional A
- Bella Vista
- Colón Fútbol Club
- Liverpool
- Nacional
- Club Atlético Peñarol
- Plaza Colonia / Cutcsa Línea D union
- Progreso
- Club Atlético River Plate
- SAC Canelones
- San Jacinto Rentistas
Divisional B
- Albión
- Atenas
- Boston River
- Canadian
- Club Atlético Cerro
- Danubio
- Defensor Sporting
- Juventud
- Keguay
- Miramar Misiones
- Montevideo Wanderers Fútbol Club
- Náutico
- Racing Club de Montevideo
- Rampla Juniors
- San José
- UdelaR

== El País Cup ==
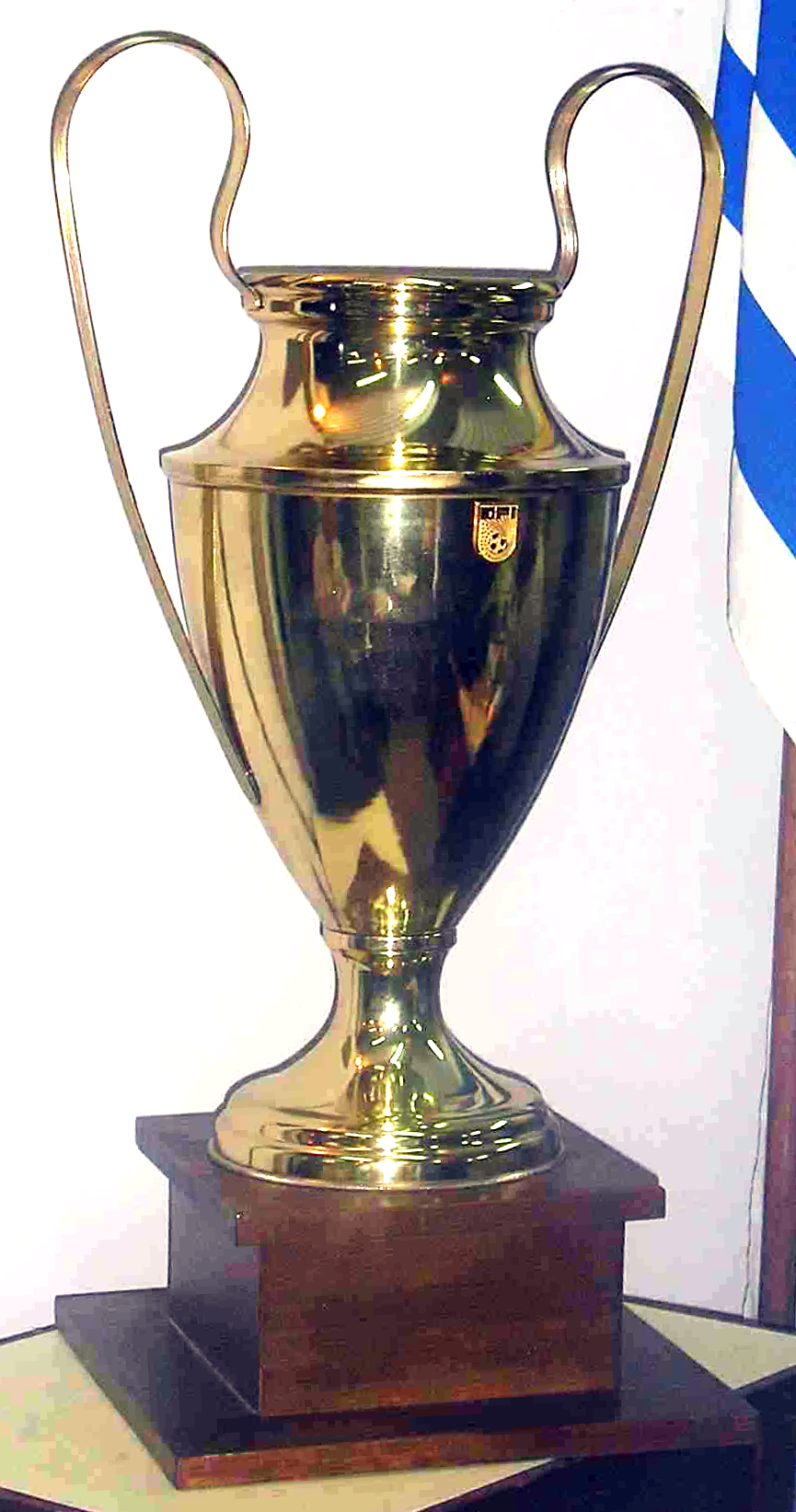
Trophy of National Clubs Cup

The National Clubs Cup, known as El País Cup, is the tournament of the Interior teams that are not participating in the Uruguayan League and is organized by the Interior Football Organization in an amateur way.

=== League System ===
The system uses a system of promotion and relegation between the different leagues in all different levels which means that even the smallest club can reach to the top level, the Primera División. The Championship of National Clubs Cup has distributed teams in two categories.

Level	Division(s)/League(s)
1	National Clubs Cup
2	Local leagues

== See also ==
- Uruguayan Football Association
- Uruguayan Primera División
- Uruguayan championship of women's football
