= Campeonato Uruguayo Femenino B =

Football league in Uruguay

Divisional B Femenina
- Founded: 2016; 10 years ago
- Country: Uruguay
- Confederation: CONMEBOL
- Number of clubs: 10
- Level on pyramid: 2 out of 3
- Promotion to: Femenino A
- Relegation to: Femenino C
- Current champions: River Plate (2025)
- Website: auf.org.uy
- Current: 2026

The Divisional B Femenina is the second division of Women's football in Uruguay, and is organized by the Uruguayan Football Association since 2016, from a FIFA request.

== Champions ==
The Divisional B organized by the Uruguayan Football Association began to dispute in 2016.

- (In bracket, title count):

Ed.	Season	Champion	Runner-up
1	2016	Cutcsa Línea D (1)	Salus
2	2017	Liverpool (1)	San Jacinto
3	2018	Progreso (1)	Bella Vista
4	2019	Defensor Sporting (1)	Atenas
5	2020	Racing (1); Náutico (1)	—
6	2021	Montevideo Wanderers (1)	San José
7	2022	Montevideo City Torque (1)	Danubio
8	2023	San Jacinto Keguay (1)	Canadian Soccer
9	2024	Bella Vista (1)	Cerrito
10	2025	River Plate (1)	Danubio

== Titles by club ==
Club	Winners	Runners-up	Winning years	Runners-up years
Bella Vista	1	—	2024	—
Cutcsa Línea D	1	—	2016	—
Defensor Sporting	1	—	2019	—
Liverpool	1	—	2017	—
Montevideo City Torque	1	—	2022	—
Montevideo Wanderers	1	—	2021	—
Náutico	1	—	2020	—
Progreso	1	—	2018	—
Racing	1	—	2020	—
River Plate	1	—	2025	—
San Jacinto Keguay	1	—	2023	—

== See also ==
- Uruguay women's national football team
- Copa Libertadores de Fútbol Femenino
- Uruguayan football league system
