= Julio Acuña =

Uruguayan football player and manager

Personal information
- Full name: Julio Heber Acuña Alegre
- Date of birth: 11 December 1954 (age 71)
- Place of birth: Lascano, Uruguay
- Position: Goalkeeper

Youth career
- 1970–1971: Racing Montevideo

Senior career*
| Years | Team | Apps | (Gls) |
| 1972–1975 | Racing Montevideo | | |
| 1976–1981 | Montevideo Wanderers | | |
| 1982 | Fénix | | |
| 1983–1984 | Defensor | | |
| 1984–1991 | Cobresal | 226 | (0) |
| 1992 | Racing Montevideo | | |
| 1994 | Racing Montevideo | | |
| 1994 | Palermo Rocha | | |

Managerial career
- 1995: Salus (assistant)
- 1996: Peñarol (gk coach)
- 1997: Peñarol (youth)
- 1998–2000: Juventud Las Piedras
- 2001–2002: El Tanque Sisley
- 2002: Racing Montevideo
- 2003: Sud América
- 2003–2004: Cobresal
- 2004: Rocha
- 2005: Cerrito
- 2006: Cerro
- 2007: Racing Montevideo
- 2008: Atenas
- 2010: Platense Montevideo
- 2011: Tacuarembó
- 2013: Central Español
- 2015–2016: Platense Montevideo
- 2017–2018: Colón Montevideo
- 2023: Huracán Buceo
- * Club domestic league appearances and goals

Julio Heber Acuña Alegre (born 11 December 1954) is a Uruguayan former football goalkeeper and manager.

== Playing career ==
Born in Lascano, Rocha, Acuña made his senior debut with Racing Club de Montevideo in 1972. The next years, he spent seasons with Montevideo Wanderers (1976–1981), Fénix (1982) and Defensor (1983) before moving abroad and joining Cobresal in the Chilean Primera División from 1984 to 1991. With Cobresal, he took part in the 1986 Copa Libertadores and won the 1987 Copa Lan Chile.

Back to Uruguay, Acuña played for Racing Club in 1992 and 1994, studied to become a football manager during 1993, and ended his career with Palermo, winning the 1994 Liga Rochense de Fútbol.

At international level, Acuña was part of the Uruguay squad that won the 1983 Copa América.

== Coaching career ==
As a football manager, Acuña has almost developed all his career in Uruguay. His first club as a head coach was Juventud de Las Piedras from 1998 to 2000. The next years, he led clubs such as El Tanque Sisley, Racing Club de Montevideo, Rocha, Cerro, Tacuarembó, Central Español, among others.

Abroad, Acuña coached Chilean club Cobresal in 2003–04.
