= Ricardo Moller =

Uruguayan footballer (born 1980)

Personal information
- Full name: Ricardo Möller Secco
- Date of birth: 12 January 1980 (age 46)
- Place of birth: Montevideo, Uruguay
- Height: 1.88 m (6 ft 2 in)
- Position: Defender

Senior career*
Years	Team	Apps	(Gls)
2001	Bella Vista		
2002	Basáñez		
2003–2004	Cerrito	51	(2)
2005–2006	Peñarol	14	(0)
2007	Deportes Puerto Montt	21	(1)
2008	Juventud Las Piedras	2	(0)
2008	Rampla Juniors	4	(0)
2009	Progreso	25	(1)

Managerial career
- El Tanque Sisley (assistant)
- 2015: El Tanque Sisley (caretaker)
- 2020–: Boston River (youth)
- * Club domestic league appearances and goals

Ricardo Moller Secco (born January 28, 1980, in Montevideo, Uruguay) is a Uruguayan former footballer who played as a defender.

== Teams ==
- (Uruguay) Bella Vista 2001
- (Uruguay) Basáñez 2002
- (Uruguay) Cerrito 2003–2005
- (Uruguay) Peñarol 2005–2006
- (Chile) Deportes Puerto Montt 2007
- (Uruguay) Juventud Las Piedras 2008
- (Uruguay) Rampla Juniors 2008
- (Uruguay) Progreso 2009

== Personal life ==
His father, Raúl, is a football manager and former footballer with whom he coincided as assistant coach in El Tanque Sisley.
