= 2013–14 Uruguayan Segunda División season =

Segunda División
- Season: 2012–13
- Champions: Tacuarembó

The 2013–14 Uruguayan Segunda División was the season of the professional second division of football in Uruguay. A total of 14 teams competed; the top two teams and the winner of the Championship play-offs were promoted to the Uruguayan Primera División. The club in last position was relegated.

== Club information ==
Club	City	Stadium	Capacity
Atenas	San Carlos	Atenas	6,000
Boston River	Las Piedras	Parque Artigas	6,148
Canadian Soccer	Montevideo	Obdulio Varel	8,000
Central Español	Montevideo	Parque Palermo	6,500
Cerrito	Montevideo	Parque Maracaná	8,000
Deportivo Maldonado	Maldonado	Domingo Burgueño Miguel	22,000
Huracán	Montevideo	Parque Pedro Ángel Bossio	2,000
Plaza Colonia	Colonia	Parque Juan Prandi	4,500
Progreso	Montevideo	Parque Abraham Paladino	8,000
Rampla Juniors	Montevideo	Olímpico	9,500
Rocha	Rocha	Doctor Mario Sobrero	10,000
Tacuarembó	Tacuarembó	Estadio Goyenola	12,000
Torque	Montevideo	Daniel Marsicano	
Villa Teresa	Montevideo	José Nasazzi	5,002

== Standings ==
Pos	Team	Pld	W	D	L	GF	GA	GD	Pts	Promotion or relegation
1	Tacuarembó (P)	26	14	6	6	41	25	+16	48	Promotion to 2014–15 Primera División
2	Atenas (P)	26	13	7	6	43	34	+9	46	Promotion to 2014–15 Primera División
3	Deportivo Maldonado	26	10	11	5	30	28	+2	41	Qualification to Promotion Playoffs
4	Huracán	26	11	7	8	33	26	+7	40	Qualification to Promotion Playoffs
5	Boston River	26	12	3	11	40	31	+9	39	Qualification to Promotion Playoffs
6	Rocha	26	10	9	7	34	27	+7	39	Qualification to Promotion Playoffs
7	Rampla Juniors	26	11	5	10	37	34	+3	38	Qualification to Promotion Playoffs
8	Villa Teresa	26	9	9	8	34	31	+3	36	Qualification to Promotion Playoffs
9	Central Español	26	11	3	12	33	41	−8	36	Qualification to Promotion Playoffs
10	Plaza Colonia	26	8	11	7	27	24	+3	35	Qualification to Promotion Playoffs
11	Canadian Soccer	26	9	7	10	26	30	−4	34	
12	Progreso	26	7	6	13	27	37	−10	27	
13	Cerrito	26	6	5	15	24	41	−17	23	
14	Torque	26	2	9	15	27	47	−20	15	

Rules for classification: 1) points; 2) goal difference; 3) number of goals scored.
(P) Promoted

== Promotion Playoffs ==
Quarterfinals
3	Deportivo Maldonado	1	0	1
10	Plaza Colonia	0	2	2
6	Rocha	0	2	2
7	Rampla Juniors	3	3	6
9	Central Español	1	3	4
4	Huracán	0	0	0
8	Villa Teresa	2	0	2
5	Boston River	1	0	0

Semifinals
10	Plaza Colonia	3	1	4
7	Rampla Juniors	3	3	6
9	Central Español	1	0	1
8	Villa Teresa	1	1	2

Final
7	Rampla Juniors (pen.)	0	0	0 (4)
8	Villa Teresa	0	0	0 (2)

== See also ==
- 2013–14 in Uruguayan football
