= Giovanna Yun =

Uruguayan footballer (born 1992)

Personal information
- Full name: Giovanna Boram Yun Echevarría
- Date of birth: 18 July 1992 (age 34)
- Place of birth: Montevideo, Uruguay
- Height: 1.70 m (5 ft 7 in)
- Position: Midfielder

Senior career*
Years	Team	Apps	(Gls)
2010	Wanderers		
2011–2012	Nacional		
2013–2017	River Plate		
2018–2019	Nacional		
2019	Peñarol		
2019–2020	Real Murcia		

International career
- Uruguay
- * Club domestic league appearances and goals

Giovanna Boram Yun Echevarría (born 18 July 1992) is a Uruguayan former footballer who played as a midfielder.

== Early life ==
Yun was born on 18 July 1992 in Montevideo, Uruguay. Born to a South Korean father and a Uruguayan mother, she has two brothers. At the age of ten, she moved with her family from Malvín, Uruguay to El Pinar, Uruguay.

== Club career ==
In 2010, Yun signed for Uruguayan side Wanderers. One year later, she signed for Uruguayan side Nacional. Subsequently, she signed for Uruguayan side River Plate. Following her stint there, she returned to Uruguayan side Nacional in 2018 before signing for Uruguayan side Peñarol in 2019. The same year, she signed for Spanish side Real Murcia. Spanish newspaper La Verdad wrote in 2020 that she was "among the [club's] most notable players" while playing for them.

== International career ==
Yun is a Uruguay international. During the summer of 2014, she played for the Uruguay women's national football team at the 2014 Copa América Femenina. Four years later, she played for the Uruguay women's national football team at the 2018 Copa América Femenina Uruguayan newspaper wrote in 2019 that she "has long been considered a fixture on the... [Uruguay] national teams".
