= Claudio Elías =

Uruguayan footballer (born 1974)

Personal information
- Full name: Claudio Marcelo Elías Artigas
- Date of birth: 23 September 1974 (age 52)
- Place of birth: Montevideo, Uruguay
- Height: 1.81 m (5 ft 11 in)
- Position: Defender

Senior career*
Years	Team	Apps	(Gls)
1992–1995	Progreso		
1996	Central Español		
1997–1999	Progreso		
2000	Wuhan Hongtao	21	(0)
2001	Tianjin Teda	23	(2)
2002	Deportivo Maldonado	10	(1)
2003	Wuhan Gaoke	26	(1)
2004	Rangers de Talca	7	(1)
2005	América de Cali	9	(1)
2005	Fénix	12	(1)
2006	Universidad Católica (Quito)	14	(1)
2007	XV de Novembro		
2007–2008	Fénix		

International career
1995	Uruguay	4	(0)
- * Club domestic league appearances and goals

Claudio Marcelo Elías (born 23 September 1974 in Montevideo) is a former Uruguayan footballer.

== International career ==
Elías made four appearances for the senior Uruguay national football team during 1995. He made his debut on March 22, 1995, in a friendly match against Colombia (2–1 loss) in the Estadio Atanasio Girardot in Medellín.

== See also ==
- Football in Uruguay
- List of football clubs in Uruguay
