= Nicolás Gómez =

Nicolás Gómez may refer to:

- Nicolás Gómez Arenas (born 1997), Colombian political scientist and politician
- Nicolás Gómez Dávila (1913–1994), Colombian philosopher and aphorist
- Nicolás Gómez (footballer, born June 1992), Uruguayan defender
- Nicolás Gómez (footballer, born December 1992), Argentine midfielder
- Nicolás Gómez (footballer, born 1996), Argentine midfielder
