= Egidio Arévalo =

Uruguayan footballer (born 1982)

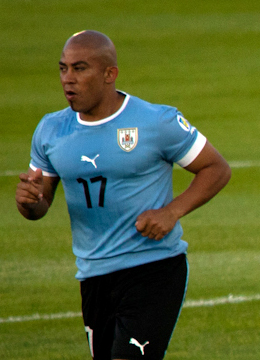
- Arévalo with Uruguay in 2011

Personal information
- Full name: Egidio Raúl Arévalo Ríos
- Date of birth: 1 January 1982 (age 44)
- Place of birth: Paysandú, Uruguay
- Height: 1.70 m (5 ft 7 in)
- Position: Defensive midfielder

Youth career
- 1999–2000: Paysandú Bella Vista

Senior career*
Years	Team	Apps	(Gls)
2001–2002	Paysandú Bella Vista	35	(2)
2002–2006	Bella Vista	108	(6)
2006–2007	Peñarol	29	(6)
2007–2008	Monterrey	32	(3)
2008	Danubio	9	(0)
2009	San Luis	7	(0)
2009–2010	Peñarol	30	(1)
2011	Botafogo	1	(0)
2011–2014	Tijuana	33	(3)
2012–2013	→ Palermo (loan)	27	(2)
2013	→ Chicago Fire (loan)	9	(0)
2014–2016	Tigres UANL	48	(1)
2014	→ Morelia (loan)	13	(1)
2016	→ Atlas (loan)	17	(0)
2016	Chiapas	15	(0)
2017	Veracruz	17	(1)
2017	Racing Club	7	(0)
2018	Libertad	16	(0)
2019	Deportivo Municipal	11	(1)
2019	Correcaminos UAT	11	(0)
2020–2021	Sud América	11	(0)
2021–2022	Sacachispas	21	(0)
Total		507	(27)

International career^{‡}
2012	Uruguay Olympic (O.P.)	5	(0)
2006–2017	Uruguay	90	(0)
Medal record
Representing Uruguay
Copa América
Winner	2011 Argentina	Team
- * Club domestic league appearances and goals as of 13 November 2020 ‡ National team caps and goals as of 5 September 2017

Egidio Raúl Arévalo Ríos (Spanish pronunciation: [eˈxiðjo aˈɾeβalo ˈri.os]; born 1 January 1982), nicknamed El Cacha, is a Uruguayan former professional footballer who played as a defensive midfielder. He also holds Mexican citizenship.

== Club career ==
Nicknamed El Cacha and occasionally referred to as El pequeño gigante, is a product of the Paysandú Bella Vista youth team. Arévalo has played for Paysandú Bella Vista, Bella Vista (Montevideo), Peñarol, Monterrey, Danubio, San Luis, Botafogo and Club Tijuana.

On July 23, 2012, after weeks of speculation, it was announced he had signed a three-year contract with Serie A club Palermo. On August 9, 2013 Arévalo was loaned to Chicago Fire for the remainder of the 2013 MLS season. On August 14, 2013 Chicago Fire announced they signed Arévalo Ríos outright. He was not retained following the season.

In December 2013, Arévalo was reportedly bought by Mexican outfit Tigres UANL, and was loaned to Monarcas Morelia for six months. In April 2014 it was revealed that Tijuana still owned the Arévalo's rights when Tigres stated they were in negotiations with Tijuana to acquire the player, the following month it was announced that Tigres signed Arévalo. Two days after his participation with the Uruguay national team on the 2014 FIFA World Cup ended, he started training immediately with Tigres, what coach Ricardo Ferretti praised and said that Arévalo is "not an idol, but an example of what a player must be". On July 9, 2014, Arévalo made his official debut with Tigres against former team Monarcas Morelia for the 2014 Supercopa MX. Arévalo was a key player in the Tigres UANL squad that achieved the finals of the 2015 Copa Libertadores. Also, he was part of the team that won the Apertura 2015 season championship. In December 2015, after the Apertura 2015 championship with Tigres, it was announced that Arévalo would be joining Atlas on loan for 6 months without a buying option. In mid-2016, he was transferred to Chiapas. In December 2016, he transferred again, to Veracruz.

== International career ==
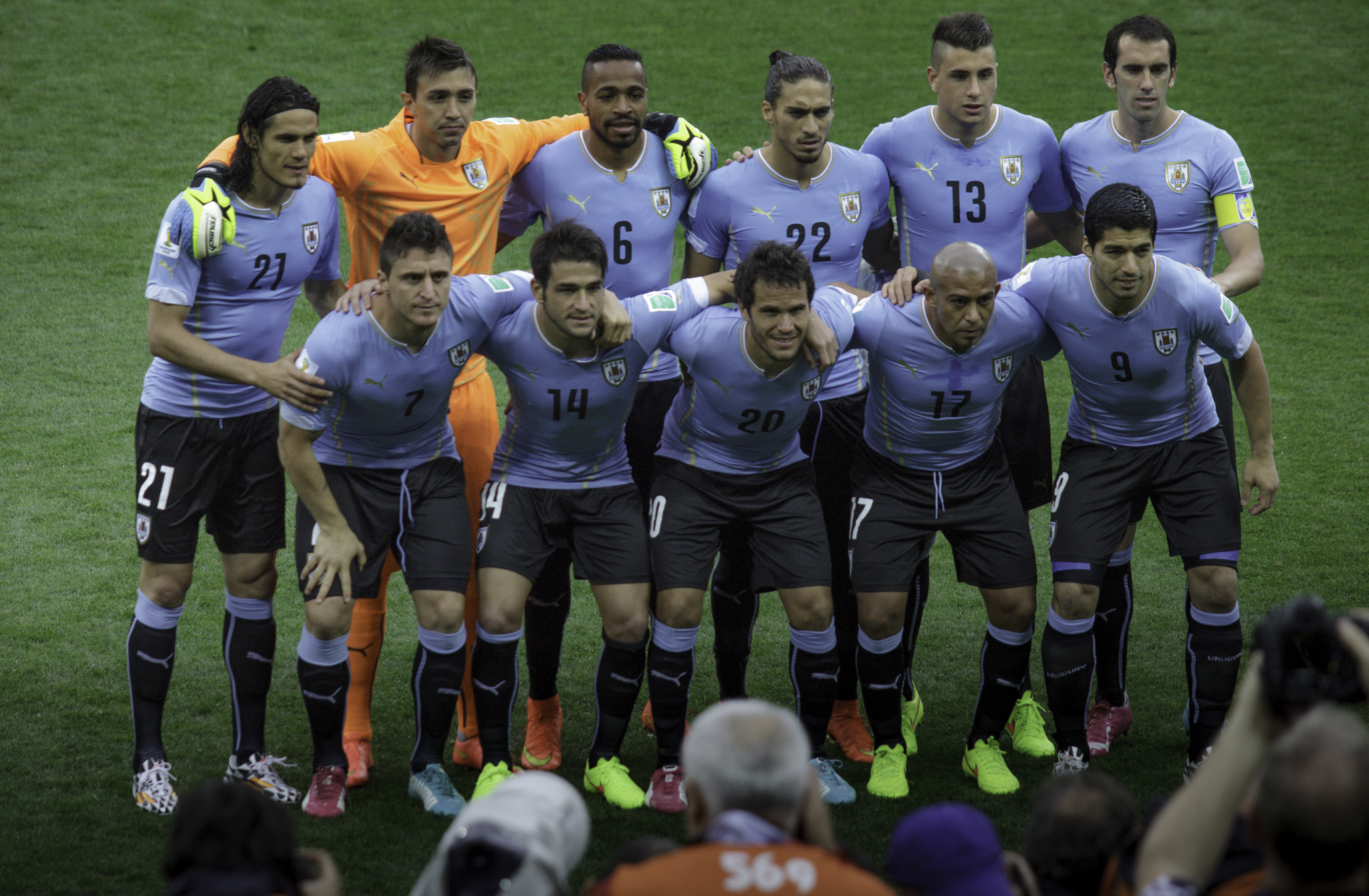
Arévalo (wearing number 17) lining up for a team photo with his compatriots during the group stage of the 2014 FIFA World Cup.

Arévalo played all of the games at the 2010 FIFA World Cup and the 2014 FIFA World Cup. In 2011, he won the Copa América in Argentina. He was chosen by Óscar Tabárez as one of the three over aged players for the London 2012 Olympics Uruguayan squad. He was chosen captain of the national team.

== Career statistics ==
=== International ===
Uruguay
Year	Apps	Goals
2006	1	0
2007	3	0
2010	11	0
2011	15	0
2012	9	0
2013	13	0
2014	13	0
2015	10	0
2016	12	0
2017	3	0
Total	90	0

Last updated: 6 September 2017
Source: Egidio Arévalo at National-Football-Teams.com

== Honours ==
=== Club ===
Peñarol

- Primera División Uruguaya Winner: 2009–10

Tigres UANL

- Liga MX: Apertura 2015

=== International ===
Uruguay

- FIFA World Cup Fourth-place: 2010
- Copa América: 2011
