= Sebastián Sánchez =

Sebastián Sánchez may refer to:

- Sebastián Sánchez (footballer, born 1988), Argentine defender
- Sebastián Sánchez (footballer, born 1989), Uruguayan midfielder
