= 2013–14 in Uruguayan football =

Football in Uruguay
- Season: 2013–14

Men's football
- Primera División: Danubio

== National leagues ==
=== Primera División ===
Cerro	Cerro Largo	Danubio	Defensor Sporting
El Tanque Sisley	Fénix	Juventud	Liverpool
Miramar Misiones	M. Wanderers	Nacional	Peñarol
Racing	Rentistas	River Plate	Sud América

- Apertura champion: Danubio (3rd title)
  - Top scorer: Héctor Acuña
    Iván Alonso
    Sergio Blanco (11 goals each)
- Clausura champion: M. Wanderers (1st title)
  - Top scorer: Héctor Acuña
    Octavio Rivero
    Jonathan Álvez
    Nicolás Royón (9 goals each)
- Overall champion: Danubio (4th title)
  - Top scorer: Héctor Acuña (20 goals)
- International qualifiers:
  - Copa Libertadores:
    - Group Stage: Danubio and M. Wanderers
    - Preliminary Round: Nacional
  - Copa Sudamericana:
    - First Stage: Danubio, River Plate, Peñarol and Rentistas
- Relegated: Liverpool, Cerro Largo and Miramar Misiones

=== Segunda División ===
Atenas	Boston River	Canadian	Central Español	Cerrito
Deportivo Maldonado	Huracán	Plaza Colonia	Progreso	Rocha
Rampla Juniors	Torque	Tacuarembó	Villa Teresa	

- Segunda División champion: Tacuarembó (1st title)
- Play-off winner: Rampla Juniors
- Promoted: Tacuarembó, Atenas and Rampla Juniors
  - Top scorer: Aldo Díaz

== Clubs in international competitions ==
Team \ Competition	2012 Copa Sudamericana	2013 Copa Libertadores
Defensor Sporting	did not qualify	Second Stage
El Tanque Sisley	First Stage	did not qualify
Montevideo Wanderers	First Stage	did not qualify
Nacional	did not qualify	First Stage
Peñarol	First Stage	Second Stage
River Plate	Second Stage	did not qualify

=== El Tanque Sisley ===
2013 Copa Sudamericana

31 July 2013 First Stage	El Tanque Sisley (Uruguay)	0–1	(Chile) Colo-Colo	Montevideo, Uruguay
20:30 UTC-03:00		Report	Toledo 27'	Stadium: Estadio Luis Franzini; Attendance: 3,740; Referee: Péricles Cortez (Brazil)

7 August 2013 First Stage	Colo-Colo (Chile)	2–0	(Uruguay) El Tanque Sisley	Santiago, Chile
21:45 UTC-04:00	F. Benítez 13'; Toledo 16'	Report		Stadium: Estadio Monumental David Arellano; Attendance: 12,559; Referee: Raúl Orosco (Bolivia)

El Tanque eliminated on points 0–6.

=== Wanderers ===
2013 Copa Sudamericana

1 August 2013 First Stage	Montevideo Wanderers (Uruguay)	1–2	(Paraguay) Libertad	Montevideo, Uruguay
18:15 UTC-03:00	F. Rodríguez 8'	Report	Montenegro 50'; M. Díaz 71' (o.g.)	Stadium: Estadio Gran Parque Central; Attendance: 1,517; Referee: Patricio Loustau (Argentina)

8 August 2013 First Stage	Libertad (Paraguay)	0–0	(Uruguay) Montevideo Wanderers	Asunción, Paraguay
21:45 UTC-04:00		Report		Stadium: Estadio Dr. Nicolás Léoz; Attendance: 5,541; Referee: Sandro Ricci (Brazil)

Wanderers eliminated on points 1–4.

=== Peñarol ===
2013 Copa Sudamericana

1 August 2013 First Stage	Cobreloa (Chile)	0–0	(Uruguay) Peñarol	Antofagasta, Chile
19:30 UTC-04:00		Report		Stadium: Estadio Regional de Antofagasta; Attendance: 6,421; Referee: Julio Quintana (Paraguay)

8 August 2013 First Stage	Peñarol (Uruguay)	0–2	(Chile) Cobreloa	Montevideo, Uruguay
20:15 UTC-03:00		Report	Droguett 12'; Lezcano 21'	Stadium: Estadio Centenario; Attendance: 30,452; Referee: Mauro Vigliano (Argentina)

Peñarol lost 0–2 on aggregate.

=== River Plate ===
2013 Copa Sudamericana

31 July 2013 First Stage	Blooming (Bolivia)	0–1	(Uruguay) River Plate	Santa Cruz, Bolivia
19:30 UTC-04:00		Report	Santos 58'	Stadium: Estadio Ramón Tahuichi Aguilera; Attendance: 8,129; Referee: Ulises Mereles (Paraguay)

6 August 2013 First Stage	River Plate (Uruguay)	4–0	(Bolivia) Blooming	Montevideo, Uruguay
17:45 UTC-03:00	Taborda 39', 62'; Santos 52'; Techera 85'	Report		Stadium: Estadio Luis Franzini; Attendance: 1,269; Referee: Pablo Díaz (Argentina)

21 August 2013 First Stage	Itagüí (Colombia)	1–0	(Uruguay) River Plate	Itagüí, Colombia
16:00 UTC-05:00	Cortés 63'	Report		Stadium: Estadio Metropolitano Ciudad de Itagüí; Attendance: 2,156; Referee: Omar Ponce (Ecuador)

28 August 2013 First Stage	River Plate (Uruguay)	0–0	(Colombia) Itagüí	Montevideo, Uruguay
19:30 UTC-03:00		Report		Stadium: Estadio Luis Franzini; Attendance: 4,007; Referee: Ulises Mereles (Paraguay)

River Plate lost 0–1 on aggregate.

== National Teams ==
=== Senior team ===
This section covers Uruguay's senior team matches from the end of the 2013 FIFA Confederations Cup to the end of the 2014 FIFA World Cup.

==== Friendly matches ====
August 14, 2013	Japan	2–4	Uruguay	Miyagi, Japan
19:20 UTC+09:00	Kagawa 55'; Honda 72'	Report	Forlán 26', 29'; Suárez 53'; González 59'	Stadium: Miyagi Stadium; Attendance: 45,883; Referee: Szymon Marciniak (Poland)

March 5, 2014	Austria	1–1	Uruguay	Klagenfurt, Austria
20:30 (CET)	Janko 14'		Pereira 66'	Stadium: Wörthersee Stadion; Attendance: 22,000; Referee: Deniz Aytekin (Germany)

May 30, 2014	Uruguay	1–0	Northern Ireland	Montevideo, Uruguay
	Stuani 62'			Stadium: Estadio Centenario

June 4, 2014	Uruguay	2–0	Slovenia	Montevideo, Uruguay
	Cavani 41'; Stuani 66'			Stadium: Estadio Centenario

==== World Cup qualifiers ====
6 September 2013 Round 13	Peru	1–2	Uruguay	Lima, Peru
21:30 UTC-02:30	Farfán 84'	Report	Suárez 43' (pen.), 67'	Stadium: Estadio Nacional; Attendance: 39,222; Referee: Patricio Loustau (Argentina)

10 September 2013 Round 14	Uruguay	2–0	Colombia	Montevideo, Uruguay
19:00 UTC-03:00	Cavani 77'; Stuani 80'	Report		Stadium: Estadio Centenario; Attendance: 51,000; Referee: Antonio Arias (Paraguay)

11 October 2013 Round 15	Ecuador	1–0	Uruguay	Quito, Ecuador
16:00 UTC-05:00	Montero 30'	Report		Stadium: Estadio Olímpico Atahualpa; Attendance: 32,996; Referee: Sandro Ricci (Brazil)

15 October 2013 Round 16	Uruguay	3–2	Argentina	Montevideo, Uruguay
21:30 UTC-02:00	C. Rodríguez 6'; Suárez 34' (pen.); Cavani 49'	Report	M. Rodríguez 14', 41'	Stadium: Estadio Centenario; Attendance: 55,000; Referee: Marcelo Henrique (Brazil)

13 November 2013 AFC-Conmebol play-off	Jordan	0–5	Uruguay	Amman, Jordan
18:00 UTC+03:00		Report	Pereira 22'; Stuani 42'; Lodeiro 69'; Rodríguez 78'; Cavani 90+1'	Stadium: Amman International Stadium; Attendance: 17,370; Referee: Svein Oddvar Moen (Norway)

20 November 2013 AFC-Conmebol play-off	Uruguay	0–0	Jordan	Montevideo, Uruguay
21:00 UTC-02:00		Report		Stadium: Estadio Centenario; Attendance: 62,000; Referee: Jonas Eriksson (Sweden)

==== FIFA World Cup ====
14 June 2014 Group Stage	Uruguay	1-3	Costa Rica	Fortaleza, Brazil
16:00 UTC-03:00	Cavani 24' (pen.)	Report	Campbell 54'; Duarte 57'; Ureña 84'	Stadium: Estádio Castelão; Attendance: 58,679; Referee: Felix Brych (Germany)

19 June 2014 Group Stage	Uruguay	2-1	England	São Paulo, Brazil
16:00 UTC-03:00	Suárez 39', 85'	Report	Rooney 75'	Stadium: Arena de São Paulo; Attendance: 62,575; Referee: Carlos Velasco Carballo (Spain)

24 June 2014 Group Stage	Italy	0-1	Uruguay	Natal, Brazil
13:00 UTC-03:00		Report	Godín 81'	Stadium: Arena das Dunas; Attendance: 39,706; Referee: Marco Rodríguez (Mexico)

28 June 2014 Round of 16	Colombia	2-0	Uruguay	Rio de Janeiro, Brazil
17:00 UTC-03:00	Rodríguez 28', 50'	Report		Stadium: Estádio do Maracanã; Attendance: 73,804; Referee: Björn Kuipers (Netherlands)
