= Óscar Tabárez =

Uruguayan footballer and manager (born 1947)

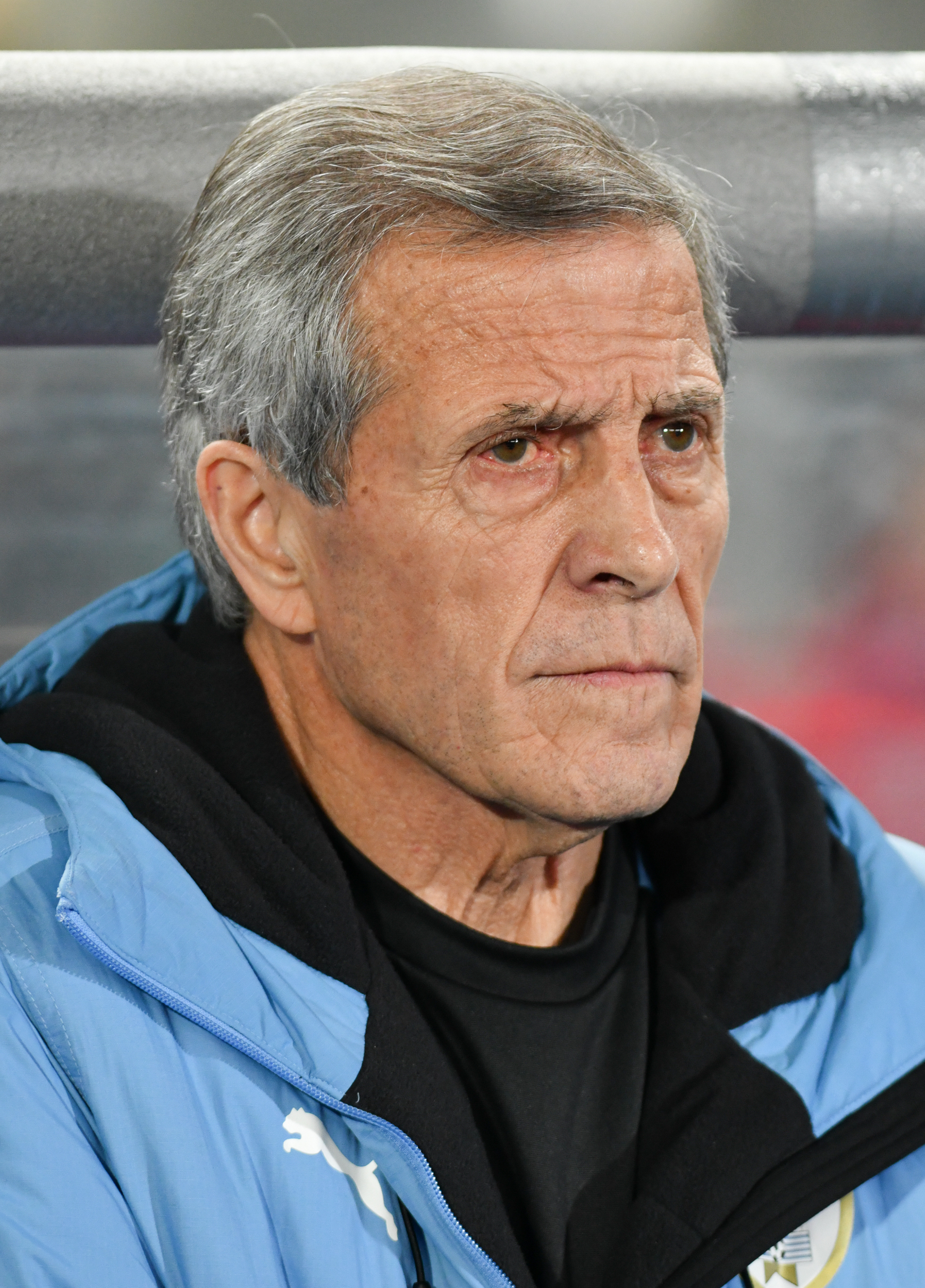
- Tabárez managing Uruguay in 2017

Personal information
- Full name: Óscar Washington Tabárez Silva
- Date of birth: 3 March 1947 (age 79)
- Place of birth: Montevideo, Uruguay
- Position: Defender

Senior career*
Years	Team	Apps	(Gls)
1967–1971	Sud América	73	(1)
1972–1973	Sportivo Italiano	18	(0)
1975	Montevideo Wanderers	9	(0)
1976	Fénix	7	(0)
1976–1977	Puebla	29	(2)
1977–1979	Bella Vista	80	(1)
Total		216	(4)

Managerial career
- 1980–1983: Bella Vista
- 1983: Uruguay U20
- 1984: Danubio
- 1985–1986: Montevideo Wanderers
- 1987: Peñarol
- 1987: Uruguay U20
- 1988: Deportivo Cali
- 1988–1990: Uruguay
- 1991–1993: Boca Juniors
- 1994–1995: Cagliari
- 1996: Milan
- 1997–1998: Real Oviedo
- 1999: Cagliari
- 2001: Vélez Sársfield
- 2002: Boca Juniors
- 2006–2021: Uruguay
- 2012: Uruguay U23
Medal record
Men's Football
Representing Uruguay (as manager)
Pan American Games
Winner	1983	Team
Copa América
Winner	2011
- * Club domestic league appearances and goals

Óscar Washington Tabárez Silva (Latin American Spanish: [ˈoskaɾ taˈβaɾes]; born 3 March 1947), is a Uruguayan former football manager and player. Known as "El Maestro" (The Teacher), he holds the record as the manager with the most games with just one national team.

After an unassuming career as a player and working as a primary school teacher, Tabárez embarked on an extensive coaching career which lasted more than 30 years and included coaching teams in Colombia, Argentina, Italy and Spain.

He managed the Uruguay national team from 1988 to 1990, returning to the job for a second time in 2006. He led the team to fourth place in the 2010 FIFA World Cup, and to victory in the 2011 Copa América. With Tabárez, Uruguay qualified for four World Cups, reaching the round of 16 twice, the quarter-finals once, and the semi-finals once. He is the fourth-ranked manager with most games at the Copa América with 30, participating in seven tournaments (1989, 2007, 2011, 2015, 2016, 2019 and 2021). In November 2019, he reached 200 games with Uruguay.

In 2012, for his contributions to football, Tabárez became the recipient of the FIFA Order of Merit, the highest honour awarded by FIFA.

== Playing career ==
During his 12-year senior playing career, Tabárez played mainly for modest clubs, representing Sud América, Sportivo Italiano (Argentina), Montevideo Wanderers (at the time when they were the first non-traditional team from Uruguay to qualify for Copa Libertadores), Fénix, Puebla in Mexico and Bella Vista. He retired at age 32.

== Managerial career ==
=== Early career ===
In 1980, one year after retiring as a player, Tabárez took up coaching at Bella Vista. There he met José Herrera, who has worked alongside him as physical trainer ever since. The following year, Tabárez was named manager of the Uruguay under-20 team. He would coach the side on two occasions. He managed the team at the Pan American Games, in 1983 in Caracas, where Uruguay won the gold medal, defeating Guatemala in the final.

Tabárez subsequently worked for various clubs in Uruguay, including Danubio, Montevideo Wanderers and Peñarol. Around this time he first met his current assistant coaches, Mario Rebollo and Celso Otero. In 1987, Tabárez led Peñarol to its fifth Copa Libertadores title after defeating América de Cali in the tournament final.

=== Uruguay national team ===
==== 1989 Copa América ====
The Copa Libertadores title was fundamental in Tabárez's appointment as manager of the Uruguay senior team, in which the 1989 Copa América, in Brazil, was his first major tournament in charge. Uruguay finished in second place, eliminating Diego Maradona-led Argentina in the process, losing to hosts Brazil at the Maracanã Stadium.

==== 1990 FIFA World Cup ====
After four games of qualification, Uruguay qualified for the 1990 FIFA World Cup, held in Italy. Uruguay reached the round of 16 of the tournament after a draw with Spain, a loss to Belgium and a win against South Korea. In the round of 16, however, Uruguay was eliminated by hosts Italy. After 34 games, Tabárez's first stint ended. The victory over South Korea was the first at the World Cup since 1970 and the last until 2010, also with Tabárez as manager.

=== Managerial work around Europe and South America ===
Tabárez later coached Argentine Primera División giants Boca Juniors for two years. In 1994, Tabárez moved to Italy to manage Serie A side Cagliari. Despite beating Inter Milan in the final stages of the season, two losses in the last two fixtures to fellow European qualification contenders Napoli and league champions Juventus meant Cagliari finished 9th, three points shy of Inter Milan in 6th, who claimed a UEFA Cup spot.

In 1996, Tabárez was hired by Milan. His spell, however, would only last a few months: after a Supercoppa Italiana defeat against Fiorentina at home at the San Siro, a 2–3 loss at Piacenza for the league cost him his position. He was replaced by Arrigo Sacchi, and the Rossoneri eventually finished 11th.

Tabárez then worked with Real Oviedo in Spain, with the club eventually only maintaining top division status in the promotion/relegation play-offs against Las Palmas, winning 4–3 on aggregate. He then returned to Cagliari, being sacked after one draw and three losses.

After two years in Argentina with Vélez Sarsfield and Boca Juniors, Tabárez spent four years away from football management.

=== Uruguay national team ===
==== The "Proceso" ====
On 7 March 2006, Tabárez took charge of the national team for a second time, and at that time Uruguay had only qualified for 2002 FIFA World Cup since his first spell as manager as they failed to qualify for 1994 FIFA World Cup (losing to Brazil in the last match in their group), 1998 FIFA World Cup (finished 7th in the group stage) and 2006 FIFA World Cup (lost to Australia in the play-off). Also on the same day he presented the "Proceso de Institucionalización de Selecciones y la Formación de sus Futbolistas" (Process of National Teams' Institutionalization and Players' Growth), which established a "proper way" of work with the national teams (under-15, -18 and -20 and the senior team), reintroducing the 4–3–3 formation and setting time for players in which they can study. With the help of the Complejo Celeste, the work were facilitated upon the objectives of the Proceso. As of 29 March 2016, 10 of the 11-most capped players for Uruguay have been part of the Proceso.

==== 2007 Copa América ====
Tabárez's first tournament saw Uruguay finish in fourth place at the 2007 Copa América in Venezuela. In the group stage, Uruguay lost to Peru (3–0), drew with Venezuela (0–0) and defeated Bolivia (1–0). In the quarter-finals, Uruguay met Venezuela again, this time winning (4–1). After being eliminated in the semi-finals on penalties (5–4) against Brazil (2–2), they lost in the match for third place against Mexico, (3–1).

==== 2010 FIFA World Cup ====
After a successful play-off against Costa Rica, Tabárez and the Charrúas qualified for the 2010 World Cup in South Africa, first winning Group A (Uruguay did not win its group since 1954 World Cup in Switzerland, 56 years prior). They drew with France (0–0), beat South Africa (3–0) and Mexico (1–0). In the round of 16 they beat South Korea (2–1). In the quarter-finals, Uruguay faced Ghana and after a draw (1–1), they went to extra time. In the last minute of extra time, a penalty kick was missed by Asamoah Gyan, after a handball by Luis Suárez.

In South Africa, the national team reached the semi-finals for the first time in 40 years, where it lost 3–2 to the Netherlands, only conceding five goals in six matches until that point. Uruguay ended the competition in fourth place, after a 3–2 defeat against Germany.

==== 2011 Copa América ====
In the 2011 Copa América, Tabárez led Uruguay to its 15th victory in the tournament, with the national side winning three games and drawing three in Argentina, and only conceding three goals. With these wins, Uruguay became the country with the most wins in the history of the Copa América. In 2011 and 2012, under Tabárez's leadership, Uruguay remained undefeated in 18 consecutive games from June 2011 to August 2012, a national team record previously set by Juan Carlos Corazzo. With the Copa América win, Uruguay qualified for the 2013 FIFA Confederations Cup.

==== 2012 Olympic Games ====
After an 84-year absence, Uruguay returned to the Olympic Games, held in London in 2012. After a victory against the United Arab Emirates U23 (2–1), the team lost the next two games against Senegal U23 (2–0) and Great Britain (1–0), marking the end of the Olympic adventure. Egidio Arévalo Ríos, Edinson Cavani and Luis Suárez were the nation's three overage players at the tournament.

==== 2013 Confederations Cup ====
Uruguay passed the first stage after a 2–1 defeat to Spain and two victories (2–1 against Nigeria and 8–0 against Tahiti). In the semi-finals, they lost 2–1 against hosts Brazil and finished in fourth place after a 2–2 draw against Italy after penalties.

==== 2014 FIFA World Cup ====
Tabárez led Uruguay in its qualification to the 2014 World Cup in Brazil, defeating Jordan in two play-off games, and thus becoming the first Uruguayan manager to do so in two consecutive World Cups. In Brazil, after an opening 3–1 defeat to Costa Rica followed by two wins (2–1 against England, 1–0 against Italy), to finish its group stage, Uruguay reached the round of 16, Tabárez's third time for Uruguay at the World Cup. This also marked the first time an Uruguayan team defeated a European opponent in 44 years, the last time being a win against the Soviet Union during the 1970 World Cup in Mexico. Without star striker Luis Suárez in the lineup, however, Uruguay lost to Colombia (0–2).

==== 2015 Copa América ====
On 19 June, the Asociación Uruguaya de Fútbol made a video tribute to celebrate Tabárez's 150 games at the helm of the Uruguay national team. In the group stage, Uruguay defeated Jamaica (1–0), lost to Argentina (1–0) and drew Paraguay (1–1) to finish in third position in its group. Uruguay qualified as the top third-placed and met Chile in the next stage. In a game marked with the controversy between Edinson Cavani and Chile's Gonzalo Jara, Uruguay were eliminated after a 1–0 defeat. After the tournament, Tabárez was suspended for three official games for the incidents of the Chile–Uruguay match, in which Cavani was also suspended for two games.

==== 2016 Copa América Centenario ====
Uruguay contested the Copa América Centenario as part of Group C, Uruguay was eliminated after its three group stage matches, losing to Mexico (3–1) and Venezuela (1–0) but defeating Jamaica (3–0).

==== 2018 FIFA World Cup ====
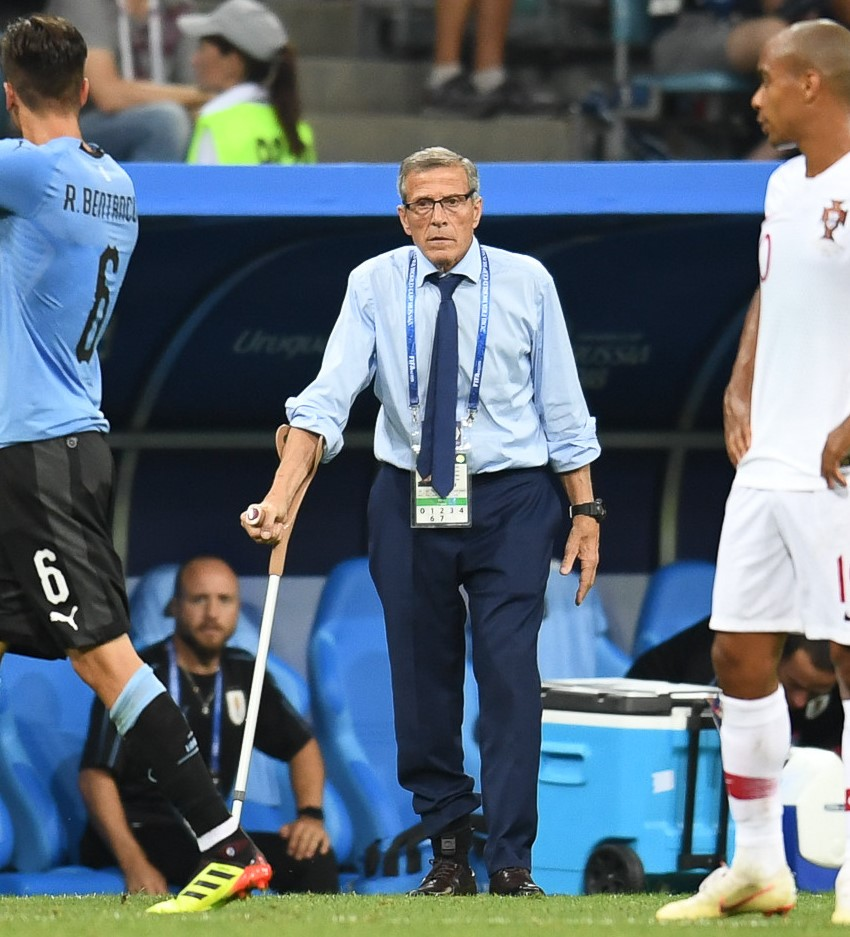
Tabárez coaching the Uruguay national team in 2018

Despite the suspension after the Copa América, and with Celso Otero assisting on the bench, Uruguay won its first two games in the 2018 World Cup qualification, the first time it had done this since the 1966 World Cup qualification, including its first ever win in La Paz against Bolivia. After the game against Chile, a 3–0 victory, Tabárez equaled Francisco Maturana as the South American coach with the most games in the CONMEBOL qualifiers, with the distinction that Tabárez has only represented one nation, Uruguay.

Qualification continued in March 2016 with a draw at Brazil (2–2) and a home win against Peru (1–0). In September 2016, after a 1–0 defeat to Argentina, Tabárez became the national team manager with the most games with one country, surpassing the record held by Sepp Herberger (167 games) since 1964. The next game saw Uruguay beat Paraguay 4–0. In October 2016, Uruguay played two games: a victory over Venezuela (the first in Uruguay for 16 years), and a draw with Colombia in Barranquilla (the first time Uruguay got a point in that city). Also, Luis Suárez tied Argentinian Hernán Crespo as the top goal scorer in World Cup Qualifications for CONMEBOL.

In November 2016, Uruguay defeated Ecuador and lost to Chile. In March 2017, Uruguay was defeated by Brazil and Peru. In June 2017, another two defeats against the Republic of Ireland and Italy led to worries about the performance of the national team. In August, Uruguay obtained a draw in the Centenario against Argentina, but a victory in September (the first time ever when visiting Paraguay), returned the team to the running for the World Cup. After the game against Argentina, Tabárez told the press that he might leave Uruguay as manager because of his age. In October Uruguay played against Venezuela (0–0) and Bolivia (a 4–2 victory), which sent Uruguay straight to the World Cup for the first time since the current Qualification system was implemented and the third time in a row.

Tabárez arrived to his fourth World Cup as the oldest manager at the tournament. With his appearance, he became tied for third-most World Cup appearances by a manager and tied for most World Cup appearances by a manager of a single national team. In the group stage, Uruguay defeated Egypt, winning its inaugural game for the first time since 1970. Uruguay the defeated Saudi Arabia to qualify for the next round for the third time in a row for the first time in World Cup history. Uruguay defeated Russia to win three consecutive games for the first time since 1954, and for the first time to win its group, with no goals against and no yellow or red cards. It was the fourth time that Uruguay advanced to the next round with Tabárez. Uruguay defeated Portugal and advanced to the quarterfinals to face France. France defeated Uruguay, and would proceed to win the World Cup. Tabárez became one of the national team managers with the most World Cups, and the third one representing the same team four times.

Following the tournament, Tabárez's contract expired, and its intended renewal was initially not completed due to controversy surrounding the national federation which included the resignation of its president Wilmar Valdez. One friendly match in September 2018 was overseen on an interim basis by the Under-20 coach Fabián Coito; the contract was renewed a few weeks later.

==== 2019 Copa América ====
Uruguay advanced to the next round after defeating Ecuador, a draw against Japan and a win against Chile. In the next round, Peru eliminated Uruguay in the penalties series. Tabárez reached 30 Copa America games, becoming the fourth in the list of national team managers with most games in the history of the competition. Uruguay ended the entire calendar year with a 13 games undefeated streak. The last time this had happened was in 1987.

==== Dismissal ====
After poor results in the 2022 FIFA World Cup qualifiers, Tabárez was fired on 19 November 2021, ending 15 years as coach of Uruguay.

=== Achievements of the "Proceso" era ===
==== Team ====
1. First Uruguayan team to win the Copa América since 1995.
2. First Uruguayan team to reach the FIFA World Cup semi-finals in 2010 since 1970.
3. First Uruguayan team to qualify for the FIFA Confederations Cup in 2013 since 1997.
4. First Uruguayan team to qualify of the 2012 Summer Olympics since 1928 Summer Olympics.
5. First Uruguayan team to beat a hosting nation at the FIFA World Cup since 1950.
6. First Uruguayan team to beat a hosting nation at the Copa America since 1987.
7. First Uruguayan team to win over Angola, Estonia, Guatemala, Hungary, Libya, Nigeria, Northern Ireland, Oman, Poland, Portugal, Russia (since the breakup of the Soviet Union), Saudi Arabia, Tahiti, Thailand, Trinidad and Tobago, Turkey, Ukraine, Uzbekistan and Wales.

==== Individual ====
1. Héctor Scarone's goalscoring record of 31 goals which was held for 81 years was broken by Diego Forlán in 2011, and also Luis Suárez is now the leading goalscorer for Uruguay.
2. Rodolfo Rodríguez's record for the most caps for Uruguay which was held for 25 years was broken by Diego Forlán in 2011 and it turn it was broken by Diego Pérez in 2012, Diego Lugano and Maxi Pereira in 2013, Diego Godín, Cristian Rodríguez and Luis Suárez in 2014, Edinson Cavani, Egidio Arévalo Ríos, Fernando Muslera and Álvaro Pereira in 2016 and Martín Cáceres in 2018.

=== World records ===
He is first on the list of managers with the most games managing one national team, surpassing the record held by Sepp Herberger (167) and Morten Olsen (166) in September 2016.

== Managerial statistics ==
As of match played 16 November 2021

Team	From	To	Record				
Team	From	To	G	W	D	L	Win %
Uruguay	1 September 1988	1 July 1990	34	17	8	9	50.00
Cagliari	1 July 1994	30 June 1995	38	14	11	13	36.84
AC Milan	1 July 1996	1 December 1996	22	8	7	7	36.36
Real Oviedo	1 July 1997	30 June 1998	41	10	13	18	24.39
Cagliari	1 July 1999	30 September 1999	4	0	1	3	0.00
Boca Juniors	1 January 2002	31 December 2002	51	27	14	10	52.94
Uruguay Olympic football team	2012	2012	6	3	1	2	50.00
Uruguay	13 February 2006	19 November 2021	194	94	49	51	48.45
Total			390	173	104	113	44.36

== Honours ==
=== Manager ===
Peñarol

- Copa Libertadores: 1987

Boca Juniors

- Primera División: 1992 Apertura
- Copa Master de Supercopa: 1992

Uruguay Youth

- Pan American Games: 1983

Uruguay

- Copa América: 2011

=== Individual ===
- FIFA Order of Merit: 2012
- IFFHS World's Best National Coach: 2011

== Personal life ==
Aside from his career in football, Tabárez also worked as a teacher. He has been diagnosed with Guillain–Barré syndrome, and was seen utilizing crutches during the 2018 FIFA World Cup.

== See also ==
- National team managers with 100 or more matches
