= Matheus Cuello =

Uruguayan football player (born 1995)

Personal information
- Full name: Anderson Matheus Cuello Rodríguez
- Date of birth: 10 December 1995 (age 30)
- Place of birth: Rivera, Uruguay
- Height: 1.70 m (5 ft 7 in)
- Position: Midfielder

Team information
- Current team: Villa Teresa
- Number: 5

Youth career
- Peñarol de Rivera

Senior career*
Years	Team	Apps	(Gls)
2015–2017	Canadian SC	35	(1)
2017–2018	Torque	16	(0)
2018–2019	Liverpool	4	(0)
2019	Cerrito	6	(0)
2020–	Villa Teresa	13	(0)
- * Club domestic league appearances and goals as of 19:30, 17 March 2021 (UTC)

Anderson Matheus Cuello Rodríguez (born 10 December 1995) is a Uruguayan footballer who plays as a midfielder for Villa Teresa in the Uruguayan Segunda División.
