= Julio Albino =

Uruguayan footballer (born 1971)

Personal information
- Full name: Julio César Albino De Lucca
- Date of birth: 28 April 1971 (age 55)
- Place of birth: Montevideo, Uruguay
- Height: 1.74 m (5 ft 9 in)
- Position: Forward

Senior career*
| Years | Team | Apps | (Gls) |
| 1991–1995 | Progreso | | |
| 1996 | Basañez | | |
| 1997 | Defensa y Justicia | 5 | (0) |
| 1997–2000 | Villa Española | | |

International career
| 1993–1994 | Uruguay | 2 | (0) |
- * Club domestic league appearances and goals

Julio César Albino De Lucca (born 28 April 1971 in Montevideo) is a former Uruguayan footballer.

== International career ==
Albino made two appearances for the senior Uruguay national football team from 1993 to 1994.
