= Jorge Plachot =

Uruguayan footballer (born 1975)

Personal information
- Full name: Jorge Martín Plachot González
- Date of birth: 1 June 1975 (age 51)
- Place of birth: Montevideo, Uruguay
- Position: Defender

Senior career*
| Years | Team | Apps | (Gls) |
| 1993–1996 | Progreso | | |
| 1997 | Basáñez | | |
| 1998 | Nacional Asunción | | |
| 1999 | Deportes Antofagasta | | |
| 2000–2001 | Municipal | 28 | (0) |
| 2001 | Deportes Antofagasta | | |
| 2001–2002 | Pumas UNAH | | |
| 2002–2003 | Antigua GFC | 32 | (0) |
| 2003 | Deportes Antofagasta | | (1) |
| 2003–2004 | FAS | | |
| 2005–2006 | Cobán Imperial | 51 | (0) |

Managerial career
- 2012–2018: Municipal (assistant)
- 2012: Municipal (interim)
- 2013: Municipal (interim)
- 2014: Municipal (interim)
- * Club domestic league appearances and goals

Jorge Martín Plachot González (born 1 June 1975) is a Uruguayan former professional footballer who played as a defender for clubs in Uruguay, Paraguay, Chile, Honduras, Guatemala and El Salvador.

== Teams ==
- (Uruguay) Progreso 1993–1996
- (Uruguay) Basáñez 1997
- (Paraguay) Nacional 1998
- (Chile) Deportes Antofagasta 1999
- (Guatemala) Municipal 2000–2001
- (Chile) Deportes Antofagasta 2001
- (Honduras) Pumas UNAH 2001–2002
- (Guatemala) Antigua GFC 2002–2003
- (Chile) Deportes Antofagasta 2003
- (El Salvador) FAS 2003–2004
- (Guatemala) Cobán Imperial 2005–006

== Coaching career ==
Plachot has worked for Guatemalan club Municipal as assistant coach, interim coach and sport director.
