= Sebastián Sánchez (footballer, born 1989) =

Uruguayan footballer

Personal information
- Full name: Álvaro Sebastián Sánchez Burgos
- Date of birth: 4 April 1989 (age 37)
- Place of birth: Tacuarembó, Uruguay
- Height: 1.77 m (5 ft 10 in)
- Position: Midfielder

Senior career*
Years	Team	Apps	(Gls)
2008–2014	Tacuarembó	89	(13)
- * Club domestic league appearances and goals

Álvaro Sebastián Sánchez Burgos (born 4 April 1989) is a Uruguayan former professional footballer who played as a midfielder.

== Career ==
Sánchez started his career in the ranks of local club Tacuarembó. He began featuring for them in the 2008–09 Primera División season, which he ended with his first senior goal after netting against Villa Española on 8 February 2009. Tacuarembó were relegated two seasons later in 2010–11, with Sánchez subsequently scoring seven goals across three campaigns in the Segunda División which culminated with promotion back to the top tier as 2013–14 champions. Sánchez left the club midway through 2014–15.

== Career statistics ==
Appearances and goals by club, season and competition
Club	Season	League			Continental		Other		Total	
Club	Season	Division	Apps	Goals	Apps	Goals	Apps	Goals	Apps	Goals
Tacuarembó	2008–09	Uruguayan Primera División	10	1	—		0	0	10	1
Tacuarembó	2009–10	Uruguayan Primera División	23	2	—		0	0	23	2
Tacuarembó	2010–11	Uruguayan Primera División	21	2	—		0	0	21	2
Tacuarembó	2011–12	Uruguayan Segunda División	14	5	—		0	0	14	5
Tacuarembó	2012–13	Uruguayan Segunda División	5	1	—		0	0	5	1
Tacuarembó	2013–14	Uruguayan Segunda División	10	1	—		0	0	10	1
Tacuarembó	2014–15	Uruguayan Primera División	6	1	—		0	0	6	1
Career total			89	13	—		0	0	89	13

== Honours ==
Tacuarembó

- Segunda División: 2013–14
