= Sebastián Guerrero =

Uruguayan football player (born 2000)

Personal information
- Full name: Sebastián Guerrero Martínez
- Date of birth: 23 September 2000 (age 26)
- Place of birth: Montevideo, Uruguay
- Height: 1.72 m (5 ft 8 in)
- Position: Forward

Team information
- Current team: CA Juventud
- Number: 90

Youth career
- Danubio
- Montevideo City Torque

Senior career*
Years	Team	Apps	(Gls)
2021–2024	Montevideo City Torque	85	(23)
2022	→ Platense (loan)	8	(0)
2024	→ Defensor Sporting (loan)	12	(0)
2024–2025	The Strongest	19	(8)
2025–	CA Juventud	7	(1)
- * Club domestic league appearances and goals as of 1 October 2025

Sebastián Guerrero Martínez (born 23 September 2000) is a Uruguayan professional footballer who plays as a forward for Uruguayan Primera División club CA Juventud.

== Career ==
A youth academy graduate of Montevideo City Torque, Guerrero made his professional debut on 31 January 2021 in his club's 3–1 league win against Cerro. He scored his first goal following week in a 4–0 win against Danubio.

On 2 February 2024, Guerrero joined Defensor Sporting on a loan deal until the end of the year. On 30 July 2024, he joined Bolivian Primera División club The Strongest on a loan deal.

== Career statistics ==
As of 26 February 2025

Club	Division	Season	League		Cup		Continental		Total	
Club	Division	Season	Apps	Goals	Apps	Goals	Apps	Goals	Apps	Goals
Montevideo City Torque	Uruguayan Primera División	2020	9	2	—		—		9	2
Montevideo City Torque	Uruguayan Primera División	2021	27	10	—		6	1	33	11
Montevideo City Torque	Uruguayan Primera División	2022	15	5	—		2	0	17	5
Montevideo City Torque	Uruguayan Primera División	2023	34	6	1	0	—		35	6
Montevideo City Torque	Total		85	23	1	0	8	1	94	24
Platense	Argentine Primera División	2022	8	0	—		—		8	0
Defensor Sporting	Uruguayan Primera División	2024	12	0	4	1	1	0	17	1
The Strongest	Bolivian Primera División	2024	14	8	—		2	0	16	8
The Strongest	Bolivian Primera División	2025	—		—		2	1	2	1
The Strongest	Total		14	8	0	0	4	1	18	9
Career total			119	31	5	1	13	2	137	34

== Honours ==
Defensor Sporting

- Copa Uruguay: 2023
