= Estadio Parque "Julio Pozzi" =

Football stadium in Salto, Uruguay

Parque "Julio Pozzi"
- Interactive map of Parque "Julio Pozzi"
- Coordinates: 31.417832°S 57.976474°W
- Owner: Salto Department
- Capacity: 6,000
- Surface: grass

Tenant
- Salto F.C.

Estadio Parque "Julio Pozzi" is a football stadium in Salto, Uruguay. It is currently used mostly for football matches of Salto F.C. The stadium holds 6,000 spectators. It is part of a sports complex Complejo Deportivo Julio Pozzi, which consists of three football fields.
