= Celso Otero =

Uruguayan footballer (born 1958)

Personal information
- Full name: Celso Otero Quintás
- Date of birth: 1 February 1958 (age 68)
- Place of birth: Montevideo, Uruguay
- Position: Goalkeeper

Senior career*
Years	Team	Apps	(Gls)
1978–1979	Nacional		
1980	Racing Montevideo		
1981	Alto Perú		
1982–1988	Montevideo Wanderers		
1988–1991	Rentistas		

International career
1988	Uruguay	1	(0)

Managerial career
- 2006–2021: Uruguay (assistant)
- 2014: Uruguay (caretaker)
- 2015: Uruguay (caretaker)
- * Club domestic league appearances and goals

Celso Otero Quintás (born 1 February 1958) is a Uruguayan football coach and former player. He most recently was the assistant manager of Uruguay national team.

He has played for Uruguay national team once, in a friendly against Colombia on 7 August 1988. He was also part of Uruguay's 1986 FIFA World Cup squad.
