= Brian Lugo =

Uruguayan footballer (born 1991)

Personal information
- Full name: Brian Lugo Silva
- Date of birth: 5 January 1991 (age 35)
- Place of birth: Montevideo, Uruguay
- Height: 1.81 m (5 ft 11 in)
- Position: Midfielder

Team information
- Current team: Terremoto
- Number: 10

Youth career
- 2005–2009: Nacional

Senior career*
| Years | Team | Apps | (Gls) |
| 2010–2012 | River Plate Montevideo | 22 | (2) |
| 2011–2012 | → Emelec (loan) | 4 | (0) |
| 2013 | Operário Ferroviário | 0 | (0) |
| 2013–2014 | Villa Teresa | 21 | (0) |
| 2014–2015 | Deportes Concepción | 18 | (0) |
| 2015 | Cerro Largo | 4 | (0) |
| 2016–2017 | Cerro | 13 | (1) |
| 2018 | Sud América | 16 | (0) |
| 2019 | Fénix | 19 | (2) |
| 2023– | Terremoto | – | (–) |
- * Club domestic league appearances and goals as of 29 October 2024

Brian Lugo Silva (born January 5, 1991, in Montevideo, Uruguay) is a Uruguayan footballer who plays as a midfielder for Terremoto in the Uruguayan third level.

== Teams ==
- (Uruguay) Nacional (Reserves) 2005–2009
- (Uruguay) River Plate 2010–2011
- (Ecuador) Emelec 2011–2012
- (Uruguay) River Plate 2012
- (Brazil) Operário Ferroviário 2013
- (Uruguay) Villa Teresa 2013–2014
- (Chile) Deportes Concepción 2014–2015
- (Uruguay) Cerro Largo 2015
- (Uruguay) Cerro 2016–2017
- (Uruguay) Sud América 2018
- (Uruguay) Fénix 2019
- (Uruguay) Terremoto 2023–Present
