= Campeonato Uruguayo Femenino =

Football league in Uruguay

Primera División
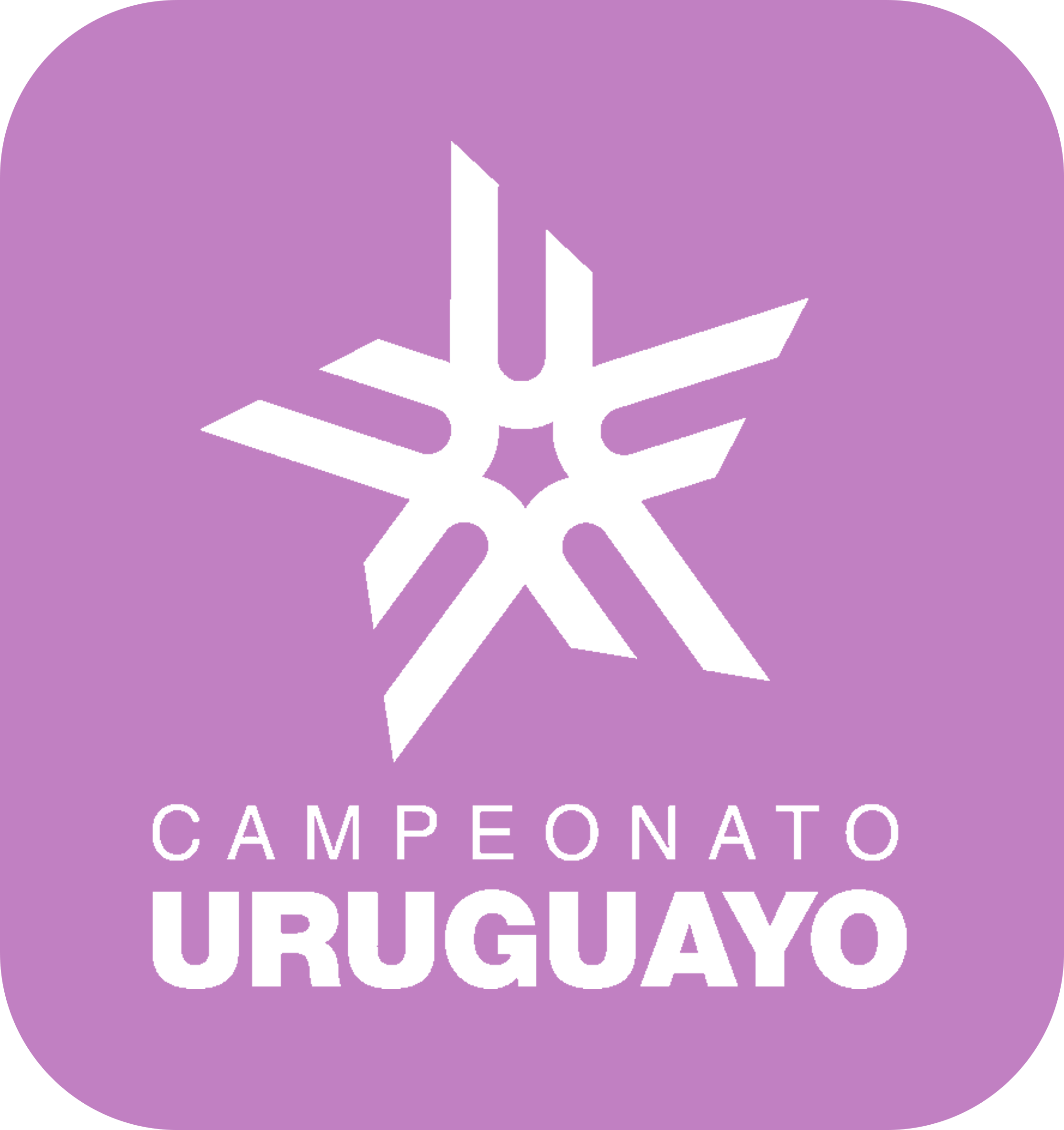
- Founded: 1996; 30 years ago
- Country: Uruguay
- Confederation: CONMEBOL
- Number of clubs: 15
- Level on pyramid: 1 out of 3
- Relegation to: Femenino B
- International cup: Copa Libertadores Femenina
- Current champions: Nacional (2025)
- Most championships: Rampla Juniors (10 titles)
- Top scorer: Juliana Castro (307 goals)
- Website: auf.org.uy
- Current: 2026

The Women's Uruguayan Championship is the highest division of women's football in Uruguay, and is organized by the Uruguayan Football Association since 1996, from a FIFA request.

== Format ==
The current format, introduced in 2014, is divided into two stages. In the first stage, teams are split into groups of three to four. The top teams advance to the championship round, known as the Copa de Oro, while the lowest-placed teams compete in the Copa de Plata. Both rounds in the second stage are played with about 7 teams. The winner of the Copa de Oro is the national champion and qualifies to the Copa Libertadores Femenina. The losers of the Copa de Plata are relegated to the Campeonato Uruguayo Femenino B.

Since 2017 the Apertura and Clausura format is played. In 2017 there were two stages. In the first stage there were seven teams that played each other once. The leading team qualified directly for Stage 2, while the teams placed second to sixth competed in a playoff round. The three winners of this round also advanced to Stage 2. The final four teams had their points reset and then played a round-robin (the cuadrangular) for the title. Since 2018 the Apertura and Clausura are both standard round-robin.

== List of Champions ==
- (In bracket, title count):

Ed.	Season	Champion	Runner-up	Winning manager
1	1996	Rampla Juniors (1)	Cerro	(Uruguay) Oribe Álvarez
2	1997	Nacional (1)	Rampla Juniors	(Uruguay) Luis Alberto Noble
3	1998	Rampla Juniors (2)	Nacional	(Uruguay) Oribe Álvarez
4	1999	Rampla Juniors (3)	Nacional	(Uruguay) Juan Carlos Borteiro
5	2000	Nacional (2)	Rampla Juniors	(Uruguay) Gustavo Luis Pérez Machín
6	2001	Rampla Juniors (4)	Nacional	(Uruguay) Jorge Yeye
7	2002	Rampla Juniors (5)	Nacional	(Uruguay) Gonzalo Ribas
8	2003	Rampla Juniors (6)	Montevideo Wanderers	(Uruguay) Antonio Díaz
9	2004	Rampla Juniors (7)	Huracán	(Uruguay) Antonio Díaz
10	2005	Rampla Juniors (8)	Huracán	(Uruguay) Graciela Noemí Barboza (Uruguay) Juan Castillo
11	2006	Rampla Juniors (9)	INAU	(Uruguay) Juan Castillo
12	2007	River Plate (1)	Rampla Juniors	(Uruguay) Jorge Ramírez (Uruguay) Raúl Álvaro González
13	2008	Rampla Juniors (10)	River Plate	(Uruguay) Juan Castillo
14	2009	River Plate (2)	Rampla Juniors	(Uruguay) Raúl Álvaro González
15	2010	Nacional (3)	River Plate	(Uruguay) Alímedes Barindelli
16	2011	Nacional (4)	Cerro	(Uruguay) Alímedes Barindelli
17	2012	Cerro (1)	Montevideo Wanderers	(Uruguay) Daniel Pérez
18	2013	Colón (1)	Nacional	(Uruguay) Ignacio Chitnisky
19	2014	Colón (2)	Nacional	(Uruguay) Fabiana Manzolillo
20	2015	Colón (3)	Nacional	(Uruguay) Fabiana Manzolillo
21	2016	Colón (4)	Nacional	(Venezuela) Juan Carlos Hernández
22	2017	Peñarol (1)	Colón	(Uruguay) Daniel Pérez
23	2018	Peñarol (2)	Colón	(Uruguay) Daniel Pérez
24	2019	Peñarol (3)	Nacional	(Uruguay) Daniel Pérez
25	2020	Nacional (5)	Peñarol	(Uruguay) Diego Testas
26	2021	Defensor Sporting (1)	Nacional	(Uruguay) Líber Correa
27	2022	Nacional (6)	Peñarol	(Uruguay) Diego Testas
28	2023	Peñarol (4)	Nacional	(Uruguay) Cecilia Santo
29	2024	Nacional (7)	Peñarol	(Uruguay) Marcel Rauss
30	2025	Nacional (8)	Peñarol	(Uruguay) Marcel Rauss
31	2026			

== Titles by club ==
Rank	Club	Winners	Runners-up	Winning years	Runners-up years
1	Rampla Juniors	10	4	1996, 1998, 1999, 2001, 2002, 2003, 2004, 2005, 2006, 2008	1997, 2000, 2007, 2009
2	Nacional	8	10	1997, 2000, 2010, 2011, 2020, 2022, 2024, 2025	1998, 1999, 2001, 2002, 2013, 2014, 2015, 2016, 2019, 2021
3	Peñarol	4	4	2017, 2018, 2019, 2023	2020, 2022, 2024, 2025
3	Colón	4	2	2013, 2014, 2015, 2016	2017, 2018
4	River Plate	2	2	2007, 2009	2008, 2010
5	Cerro	1	2	2012	1996, 2011
5	Defensor Sporting	1	0	2021	—
—	Huracán	0	2	—	2004, 2005
—	Montevideo Wanderers	0	2	—	2003, 2012
—	INAU	0	1	—	2006

== Half-year / Short tournaments ==
=== Apertura and Clausura seasons ===
Season		Champion	Runner-up
1997	Apertura	Nacional	
1997	Clausura	Rampla Juniors	Nacional
1998	Apertura	Rampla Juniors	Nacional
1998	Clausura	Rampla Juniors	Nacional
1999	Apertura	Nacional	Rampla Juniors
1999	Clausura	Rampla Juniors	Nacional
2000	Apertura	Nacional	Rampla Juniors
2000	Clausura	Rampla Juniors	
2001	Apertura	Rampla Juniors	Nacional
2001	Clausura	Rampla Juniors	Nacional
2002	Apertura	Rampla Juniors	Racing
2002	Clausura	Nacional	Racing
2003	Apertura	Rampla Juniors	Nacional
2003	Clausura	Montevideo Wanderers	Rampla Juniors
2004	Apertura	Rampla Juniors	Nacional
2004	Clausura	Rampla Juniors	
2005	Apertura	Rampla Juniors	Huracán
2005	Clausura	Huracán	Rampla Juniors
2006	Apertura	Rampla Juniors	INAU
2006	Clausura	Rampla Juniors	INAU
2007	Apertura	River Plate	Rampla Juniors
2007	Clausura	Rampla Juniors	River Plate
2008	Apertura	Rampla Juniors	River Plate
2008	Clausura	Rampla Juniors	River Plate
2009	Apertura	River Plate	Rampla Juniors
2009	Clausura	Rampla Juniors	River Plate
2011	Apertura	Nacional	Cerro
2011	Clausura	Nacional	Cerro
2017	Apertura	Peñarol	Nacional
2017	Clausura	Colón	Peñarol
2018	Apertura	Colón	Nacional
2018	Clausura	Peñarol	Nacional
2019	Apertura	Peñarol	Nacional
2019	Clausura	Peñarol	Nacional
2022	Apertura	Nacional	Peñarol
2022	Clausura	Nacional	Peñarol
2023	Apertura	Nacional	Defensor Sporting
2023	Clausura	Peñarol	Nacional
2026	Apertura	Nacional	Peñarol
2026	Clausura	Peñarol	Montevideo City Torque

=== Torneo Intermedio ===
Year	Champion	Score	Runner-up
2023	Nacional	1–0	Montevideo City Torque

=== Torneo Preparación ===
Year	Champion	Runner-up
2001	Rampla Juniors	Nacional
2002	Cerro	Rampla Juniors
2003	Rampla Juniors	
2004	Rampla Juniors	
2008	River Plate	Huracán

== See also ==
- Uruguay women's national football team
- Copa Libertadores de Fútbol Femenino
- Uruguayan football league system
