= Campeonato Uruguayo Femenino C =

Football league in Uruguay

Divisional C Femenina
- Founded: 2022; 4 years ago
- Country: Uruguay
- Confederation: CONMEBOL
- Number of clubs: 9
- Level on pyramid: 3 out of 3
- Promotion to: Femenino B
- Current champions: La Luz City Park (2022)
- Website: auf.org.uy
- Current: 2023

The Divisional C Femenina is the third division of women's football in Uruguay, and is organized by the Uruguayan Football Association since 2022, from a FIFA request.

== Champions ==
The Divisional C organized by the Uruguayan Football Association began to dispute in 2022.

- (In bracket, title count):

Ed.	Season	Champion	Runner-up
1	2022	La Luz City Park (1)	Cerro

== Titles by club ==
Club	Winners	Runners-up	Winning years	Runners-up years
La Luz City Park	1	—	2022	—

== See also ==
- Uruguay women's national football team
- Copa Libertadores de Fútbol Femenino
- Uruguayan football league system
