= Marcelo Tabárez =

Uruguayan footballer (born 1993)

Personal information
- Full name: Marcelo Tabárez Rodríguez
- Date of birth: 10 February 1993 (age 33)
- Place of birth: Montevideo, Uruguay
- Height: 1.70 m (5 ft 7 in)
- Position: Forward

Team information
- Current team: Villa Teresa
- Number: 11

Youth career
- Danubio

Senior career*
Years	Team	Apps	(Gls)
2013–2018	Danubio	58	(8)
2018	Deportivo Capiatá	6	(2)
2018–2019	Villa Teresa	7	(4)
2019	Plaza Colonia	13	(0)
2020–	Villa Teresa	10	(3)
- * Club domestic league appearances and goals as of 19:40, 17 March 2021 (UTC)

Marcelo Tabárez Rodríguez (born 10 February 1993) is a Uruguayan footballer who plays as a forward for Villa Teresa in the Uruguayan Segunda División.
