= Joaquín Zeballos =

Uruguayan football player (born 1996)

Personal information
- Full name: Joaquín Zeballos Machado
- Date of birth: 13 November 1996 (age 30)
- Place of birth: Rocha, Uruguay
- Height: 1.78 m (5 ft 10 in)
- Position: Forward

Team information
- Current team: Montevideo Wanderers
- Number: 19

Youth career
- Deportivo Maldonado

Senior career*
Years	Team	Apps	(Gls)
2014–2017	Deportivo Maldonado	48	(10)
2017	Huracán	27	(7)
2018–2019	Juventud Las Piedras	61	(30)
2020–2021	Girona	5	(0)
2020–2021	→ Barcelona B (loan)	13	(0)
2021–2024	Montevideo City Torque	31	(3)
2022	→ Deportivo Maldonado (loan)	11	(1)
2023	→ Santiago Wanderers (loan)	24	(5)
2024	River Plate Montevideo	12	(1)
2025–	Montevideo Wanderers	10	(0)
- * Club domestic league appearances and goals as of 3 May 2025

Joaquín Zeballos Machado (born 13 November 1996) is an Uruguayan professional footballer who plays as a forward for Montevideo Wanderers.

== Career ==
Zeballos is a youth academy graduate of Deportivo Maldonado. On 5 October 2020, he joined Barcelona B on a season long loan deal from Girona.

On 27 August 2021, Montevideo City Torque announced the signing of Zeballos on a permanent contract until the end of December 2024.
