= Juan Viacava =

Uruguayan footballer (born 1999)

Personal information
- Full name: Juan Bautista Viacava Caviglia
- Date of birth: 20 February 1999 (age 27)
- Place of birth: Montevideo, Uruguay
- Height: 1.82 m (5 ft 11 1/2 in)
- Position: Midfielder

Team information
- Current team: Independiente del Valle

Youth career
- 2012–2013: Defensor Sporting
- 2013–2015: Fénix

Senior career*
Years	Team	Apps	(Gls)
2016–2020	Fénix	9	(0)
2019–2020	→ Rampla Juniors (loan)	9	(0)
2020	Miramar Misiones	10	(0)
2021–2022	Racing de Ferrol	23	(0)
2022–2023	Uruguay Montevideo	28	(2)
2024–	Defensor Sporting	52	(1)
- * Club domestic league appearances and goals as of 1 October 2025

Juan Bautista Viacava Caviglia (born 20 February 1999) is a Uruguayan professional footballer who plays as a midfielder for Independiente del Valle.
