= Nicolás Gómez (footballer, born June 1992) =

Uruguayan footballer

Personal information
- Full name: Nicolás Evar Gómez Silveira
- Date of birth: 24 June 1992 (age 34)
- Place of birth: Montevideo, Uruguay
- Height: 1.86 m (6 ft 1 in)
- Position: Centre back

Team information
- Current team: Progreso
- Number: 2

Youth career
- Danubio

Senior career*
Years	Team	Apps	(Gls)
2013–2014	Boston River		
2014–2015	Miramar Misiones	24	(1)
2016	Cerro Largo	9	(0)
2016–2017	Miramar Misiones	12	(1)
2017	Villa Española	27	(1)
2018	Central Español	0	(0)
2018–2019	Fuerza Amarilla	39	(2)
2019	Villa Española	10	(0)
2020	Villa Teresa	15	(0)
2021–2022	Miramar Misiones	26	(3)
2023	Cerro	14	(0)
2024	Xinabajul	17	(1)
2024–	Progreso	0	(0)
- * Club domestic league appearances and goals as of 14 September 2024

Nicolás Evar Gómez Silveira (born 24 June 1992) is a Uruguayan footballer who plays as a centre back for Progreso.

== Career ==
Gómez began his career in the ranks of Danubio, which preceded a move to Boston River on 30 September 2013. Three months after, Gómez joined Miramar Misiones of the Uruguayan Primera División. He made his professional bow versus El Tanque Sisley on 16 February 2014, in one of seven appearances in 2013–14 as the club suffered relegation. Gómez subsequently scored his first senior goal in the Uruguayan Segunda División, netting a stoppage time winner over Villa Española at Parque Luis Méndez Piana on 29 April 2015. Miramar Misiones finished that campaign in ninth position, with the defender then moving to Cerro Largo.

After appearing in nine fixtures for them across the 2015–16 campaign, Gómez departed midway through the season to rejoin Miramar Misiones. He was notably sent off in his final match for Cerro Largo, as well as on his secondary debut for Miramar Misiones on 2 April 2016 against Rocha. He returned to the starting line-up on 30 April for a match with Atenas, but was again shown a red card; in a fixture that also saw him score an own-goal. In total, Gómez made nine appearances for the club in his second spell; receiving three red cards in the process, having got another on 2 October 2016 versus Tacuarembó. In March 2017, Villa Española signed Gómez.

On 27 February 2018, Gómez switched Uruguay for Ecuador after joining Fuerza Amarilla; having only signed for Central Español weeks prior. Goals followed against Manta and L.D.U. Portoviejo in Serie B as they won promotion to Serie A.

== Career statistics ==
As of 3 January 2019.

Club statistics
Club	Season	League			Continental		Other		Total	
Club	Season	Division	Apps	Goals	Apps	Goals	Apps	Goals	Apps	Goals
Miramar Misiones	2013–14	Primera División	7	0	—		0	0	7	0
Miramar Misiones	2014–15	Segunda División	17	1	—		0	0	17	1
Miramar Misiones	Total		24	1	—		0	0	24	1
Cerro Largo	2015–16	Segunda División	9	0	—		0	0	9	0
Miramar Misiones	2015–16	Segunda División	4	0	—		0	0	4	0
Miramar Misiones	2016	Segunda División	8	1	—		0	0	8	1
Miramar Misiones	Total		12	1	—		0	0	12	1
Villa Española	2017	Segunda División	27	1	—		2 (Note: Appearance(s) in the Segunda División play-offs)	0	29	1
Central Español	2018	Segunda División	0	0	—		0	0	0	0
Fuerza Amarilla	2018	Serie B	32	2	—		0	0	32	2
Career total			104	5	—		2	0	106	5
