= Peñarol (women) =

- Full name: Club Atlético Peñarol
- Nickname: Carboneras
- Founded: 2012; 14 years ago
- Ground: Estadio Contador Damiani
- Capacity: 12,000
- Chairman: Juan Ignacio Ruglio
- League: Campeonato Uruguayo Femenino
- 2020: 2nd
- Website: http://www.peñarol.org/
Home colours	Away colours	Third colours

Club Atlético Peñarol is the women's football section of the Uruguayan sports club Peñarol based in Montevideo. They currently play in the Campeonato Uruguayo Femenino. The club have won the league title three times consecutively in 2017, 2018 and 2019.

== History ==
The women's section of Club Atlético Peñarol (founded in 1891) played in the 1970s in the first women's championships. In 1975 the women's competitions were discontinued. In 1996, the Uruguayan Football Association took over the organization, first in the form of a 5-a-side football tournament. In 1997, the championship was played with eleven. Peñarol entered a women's team in 2012 and joined the Campeonato Uruguayo Femenino in 2013.

On 13 April 2013, the club played its first classic against Nacional which at that time was a major club in Uruguayan women's football. In the first meeting, Peñarol lost 7 to 0.

Peñarol ended the hegemony of Colón in 2017 by winning their first league title. The club repeated this the following two seasons and debuted in Copa Libertadores Femenina in 2018.

In 2020, Peñarol finished runners-up behind their main rivals Nacional.

== Honours ==
- Campeonato Uruguayo Femenino (4): 2017, 2018, 2019, 2023
