= Club Paysandú Bella Vista =

Association football club in Uruguay

Paysandú Bella Vista
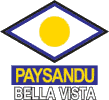
- Badge of Paysandú Bella Vista
- Full name: Club Paysandú Bella Vista
- Founded: January 11, 1939
- Ground: Estadio Parque Bella Vista, Paysandú, Uruguay
Home colours	Away colours

Club Paysandú Bella Vista, commonly known as Paysandú Bella Vista, is a Uruguayan football club from Paysandú. They competed in the Primera División four times.

== History ==
The club was founded on January 11, 1939, as Bella Vista Ferroviario. at Juan Spolita's home. The club played its first game ever against Paysandú Wanderers in the same year. Paysandú Bella Vista was renamed to Atlético Bella Vista on July 3, 1973. They competed in the Primera División in 1999, 2000, 2001, 2001 and in 2002, when they were relegated to the Segunda División. The club was renamed back to Paysandú Bella Vista in 2005.
