= Uruguayan Segunda División Amateur =

Segunda División Amateur
- Founded: 1972
- Folded: 2016; 10 years ago
- Country: Uruguay
- Confederation: CONMEBOL
- Level on pyramid: 3
- Promotion to: Segunda División
- Relegation to: Divisional Extra
- Most championships: Villa Española (5 titles)
- Broadcaster(s): Tenfield
- Website: segundab.com.uy

Segunda División Amateur was the third division of the Asociación Uruguaya de Fútbol league system. The league was sometimes referred to as Segunda Amateur.

== List of champions ==
Ed.	Season	Champion
Primera División C
1	1972	Salus
2	1973	Villa Española
3	1974	Miramar Misiones
4	1975	Progreso
5	1976	La Luz
6	1977	Salus
7	1978	Progreso
8	1979	Universidad Mayor
9	1980	Villa Española
10	1981	Platense
11	1982	Cerrito
12	1983	Huracán
13	1984	Villa Teresa
14	1985	Sportivo Italiano
15	1986	El Tanque Sisley
16	1987	Villa Española
17	1988	Colón
18	1989	Basáñez
19	1990	Huracán
20	1991	Fénix
21	1992	La Luz
22	1993	Uruguay Montevideo
23	1994	Platense
24	1995	Juventud
División de Aficionados
25	1996	Villa Española
Liga Metropolitana Amateur
26	1997	El Tanque Sisley
27	1998	Cerrito
28	1999	Villa Teresa
29	2000	Colón
30	2001	La Luz
31	2002	Uruguay Montevideo
32	2003	La Luz
33	2004	Oriental
34	2005	Platense
35	2006	Boston River
36	2007–08	Oriental
Segunda División Amateur
37	2008–09	Oriental
38	2009–10	Huracán
39	2010–11	Villa Teresa
40	2011–12	Torque
41	2012–13	Canadian
42	2013–14	Villa Española
43	2014–15	Oriental
44	2015–16	Cerrito

== Titles by club ==
Club	Winners	Winning years
Villa Española	5	1973, 1980, 1987, 1996, 2013–14
La Luz	4	1976, 1992, 2001, 2003
Oriental	4	2004, 2007–08, 2008–09, 2014–15
Cerrito	3	1982, 1998, 2015–16
Huracán	3	1983, 1990, 2009–10
Platense	3	1981, 1994, 2005
Villa Teresa	3	1984, 1999, 2010–11
Colón	2	1988, 2000
El Tanque Sisley	2	1986, 1997
Progreso	2	1975, 1978
Salus	2	1972, 1977
Uruguay Montevideo	2	1993, 2002
Basáñez	1	1989
Boston River	1	2006
Canadian	1	2012–13
Fénix	1	1991
Juventud	1	1995
Miramar Misiones	1	1974
Sportivo Italiano	1	1985
Torque	1	2011–12
Universidad Mayor	1	1979
