= Salto F.C. =

Uruguayan football club

- Full name: Salto Uruguay Fútbol Club
- Nicknames: Decano, Albiceleste, el Uru
- Founded: April 5, 1905
- Ground: Estadio Parque "Julio Pozzi"; Salto, Uruguay
- Capacity: 6,000
- Chairman: Roque Escobar
- Manager: Ramón Vela - Daniel Moreira
- League: Liga Salteña de Football
- 2011: 2nd
- Website: http://www.saltouruguay.org
| Home colours | Away colours |

Salto Uruguay Fútbol Club, usually known as Salto F.C. is a football club from Salto in Uruguay. They currently play in the Liga Salteña de Football.

== History ==
Salto Uruguay Football Club was founded on April 5, 1905, and is currently the third oldest football club in the interior and the eighth overall in Uruguay. It is also the oldest club in the Football League Salteña.

== Titles ==
- Copa El País (1):

1966

- Campeonato del Litoral (fase intermedia de la Copa El País) (1):

1966

- Supercopa de Clubes Campeones del Interior (1):

1973
