= Salus Football Club =

Uruguayan football club

Salus
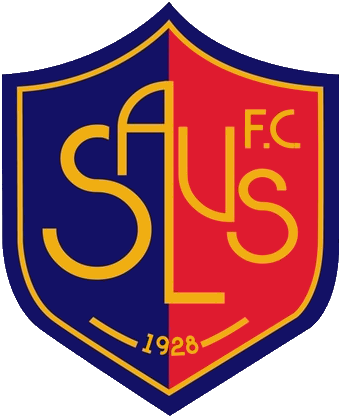
- Full name: Salus Football Club
- Nicknames: Azulgrana (Blue and Red)
- Founded: 10 April 1928
- Ground: Parque Salus
- Capacity: 4.000
- Chairman: Gabriel Noil
- Manager: Juan Carlos Paz
- League: Segunda División Amateur
- Website: http://www.salusfc.com/
Home colours	Away colours

Salus Football Club is a football club from Montevideo, Uruguay. They currently play in the Second Amateur Division, the third tier of the Uruguayan championship.

== History ==
On April 10, 1928, a gathering of a hundred players, family members, and enthusiasts from Nuevo París decided that the neighborhood club would operate "seriously,". They established the club and requested legal recognition on the same day. The club was named "Salus" after a bakery, the main collaborator during the neighborhood's football afternoons, where butchers and other suppliers would provide the neighbors various resources. Under this context, a Catalan shopkeeper donated blue and garnet FC Barcelona kits to the club, which is where its traditional colors originated from

== Titles ==
- Segunda División Amateur (2): 1972, 1977
- Divisional Extra (1): 1971
