= Club Atlético Alto Perú =

Uruguayan football club

Alto Perú
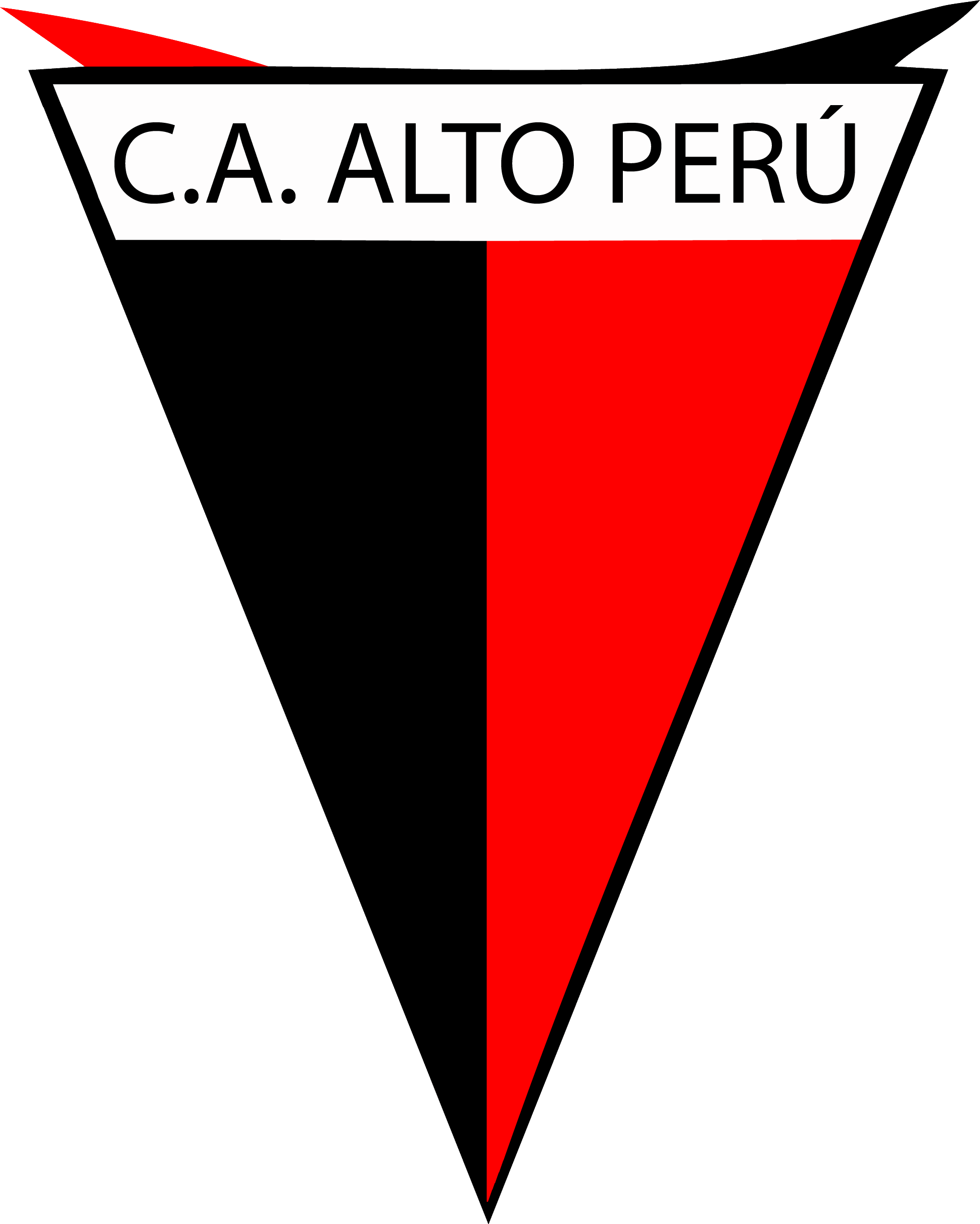
- Full name: Club Atlético Alto Perú
- Founded: May 1, 1940
- Chairman: Carlos Acosta
- Manager: José Luis de la Quintana
- League: Segunda División Amateur
- 2010–2011: 7th
Home colours	Away colours

Club Atlético Alto Perú is a football club from Montevideo in Uruguay. The club were affiliated with the second division amateur of the Uruguayan Football Association at the third level, which is the bottom and the only amateur level of the pyramid, named the second amateur division.

== Titles ==
- Uruguayan Primera División: 0

Amateur Era (0):
Professional Era (0):

- Segunda División Uruguay: 0

- Segunda División Amateur Uruguay: 1

Torneo Apertura 2006
