= Club Atlético Platense (Uruguay) =

Uruguayan football club

Platense
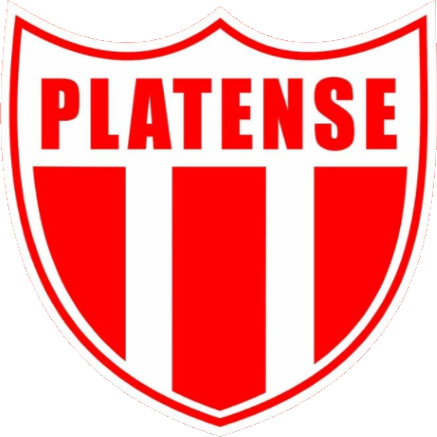
- Full name: Club Atlético Platense
- Founded: May 1, 1935
- Ground: Estadio Obdulio Jacinto Varela; Montevideo, Uruguay; Property of C.S.D. Villa Española
- Capacity: 8,000
- Manager: José Urruzmendi
- League: Segunda División Uruguay
- 2006-07: 13th
Home colours	Away colours

Club Atlético Platense is a football club from Montevideo in Uruguay. It currently plays in the Uruguayan 2nd Amateur Division, the third tier of Uruguayan championship.

Platense won the 2005/2006 Liga Metropolitana Amateur, commonly known as 3rd division, to gain promotion.

Played some years of the 1990 decade as Platense Wanderers.

== Titles ==
- Uruguayan Segunda División Amateur (3): 1981, 1994, 2005
