= Canadian Soccer Club =

Uruguayan football club

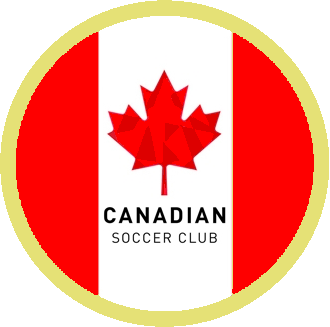
- Full name: Canadian Soccer Club
- Nickname: Canadienses
- Founded: February 14 2011
- Ground: Complejo Canadian; Toledo, Uruguay
- Capacity: N/A
- Chairman: Fernando Aldao
- League: Uruguayan Segunda División
- 2013–14: 11th
Home colours	Away colours

The Canadian Soccer Club is a Uruguayan football club based in Montevideo. It is a newly founded club that plays in the Uruguayan Segunda División.

== History ==
Canadian S.C. was founded in late 2010 by a Uruguayan living in Canada from the need of the community of Uruguayans living in Canada to have a team representing them back home. Their supporters group is known as La Banda del Norte (the Band of the North) or LBDN and their main rival is Club Atlético Torque.

The club made its official debut in the Uruguayan Segunda División Amateur on 2 October 2011 against Basañez, on a 2–1 home win. Los canadienses won the Clasura title in their second season, earning them a promotion to the Uruguayan Segunda División.

== Titles ==
- Uruguayan Segunda División Amateur: 2012–13
