= Villa Teresa =

Uruguayan football and cycling club

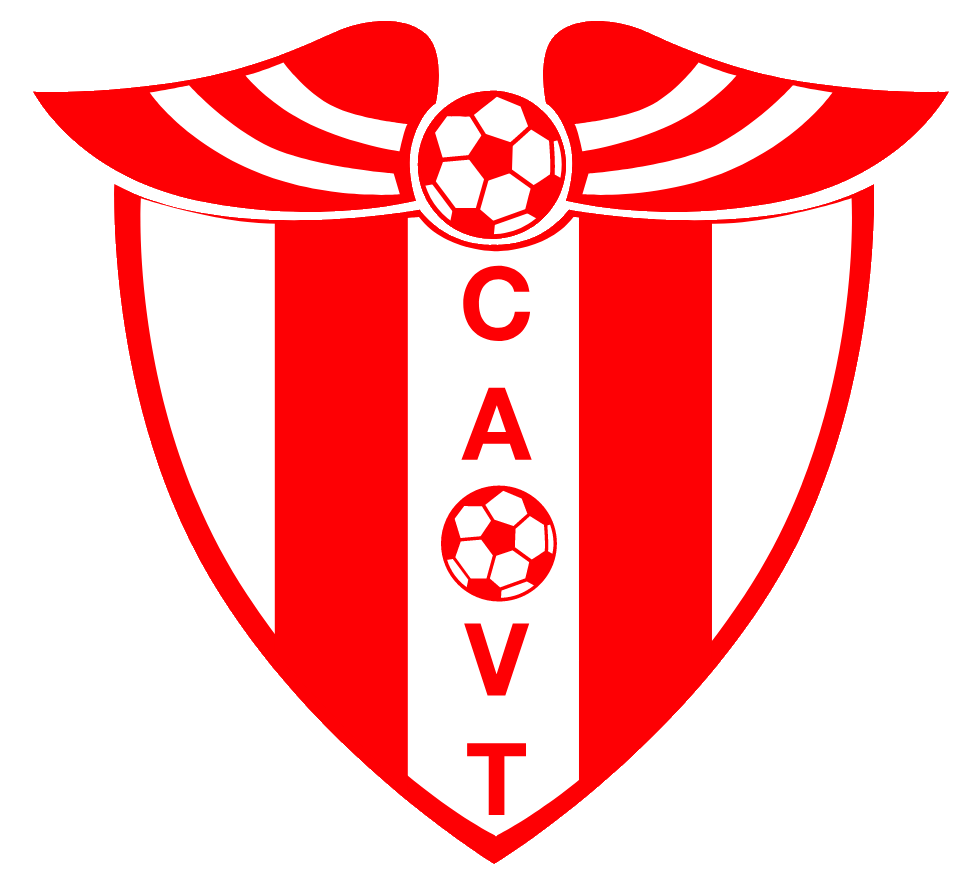
- Full name: Club Atlético Villa Teresa
- Nickname: El Villa
- Founded: June 1, 1941; 84 years ago
- Ground: Parque Salus, Montevideo, Uruguay
- Capacity: 5,000
- Chairman: María Gabriela Garay
- Manager: Edgardo Arias
- League: Segunda División
- 2020: Segunda División, 9th
Home colours	Away colours

Club Atlético Villa Teresa, is a Uruguayan football and cycling team club based in Montevideo. It was founded in 1941.

== History ==
In 2011 Villa Teresa achieved promotion from Segunda División Amateur (third level) and returned to the Professional Second Division of Uruguay.

== Cycling ==
The club also stands out in cycling, and is one of the permanent animators on the Rutas de América and the Vuelta Ciclista of Uruguay.

== Titles ==
- Segunda División Amateur de Uruguay (3): 1984, 1999, 2010–11
- Primera "D" (Uruguay) (1): 1975

== Current squad ==
As of 17 March 2021

Note: Flags indicate national team as defined under FIFA eligibility rules; some limited exceptions apply. Players may hold more than one non-FIFA nationality.

No.	Pos.	Nation	Player
1	GK	URU	Carlos Techera
2	DF	URU	Renzo Ramírez
5	MF	URU	Matheus Cuello
6	MF	URU	Martín Arguiñarena
8	MF	URU	Maximiliano Bajter
9	FW	URU	Pablo Lemos
10	MF	URU	Jorge Rodríguez
11	MF	URU	Marcelo Tabárez
12	GK	URU	Federico Cristóforo
13	DF	URU	Federico Puente
15	MF	URU	Nicolás Ayala

No.	Pos.	Nation	Player
16	FW	URU	Lucas Casavieja
19	FW	URU	Gonzalo da Luz
20	MF	URU	Diego Bértola
21	DF	URU	Agustín Pereira
22	DF	URU	Diego Viña
23	DF	URU	Lucas Morales
92	DF	URU	Nicolás Gómez
—	GK	URU	Federico Mesner
—	DF	URU	Santiago Falcón
—	FW	ARG	Tomás Oses
