= Basáñez =

Uruguayan football and boxing club

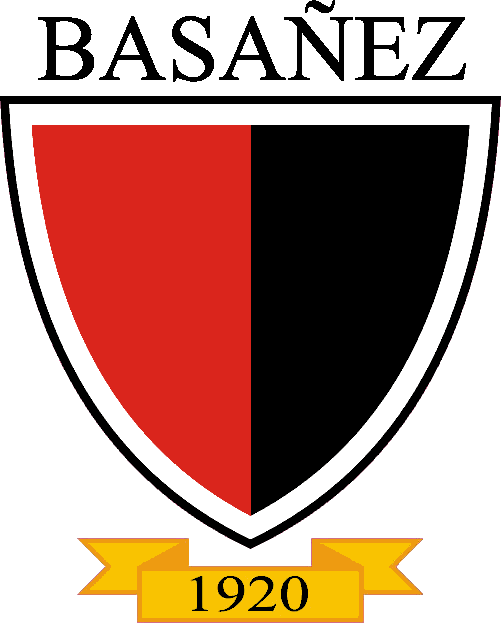
- Full name: Club Atlético Basáñez
- Nickname: Basa rojinegro
- Founded: April 1, 1920
- Ground: Estadio La Bombonera; Montevideo, Uruguay
- Capacity: 6,000
- Chairman: Diego de Leon
- Manager: Diego Antunez
- League: Segunda División Amateur
- 2015 /16: 2nd
Home colours	Away colours

Club Atlético Basáñez is a football and boxing club from Montevideo in Uruguay founded in 1920. They currently play in the Second Amateur Division, the third and last tier of the Uruguayan championship.

The club is named after Tomas Basáñez, who was a major landowner in the locality of the club. The club colors are inspired by those of the anarchist flag. One of the most popular teams from the lower divisions along with Cerrito and Racing.

== First Division ==
After being champions of the Uruguay Second Division in 1993, they were promoted to play in first division where they spent two seasons 1994 and 1995. They had never played in First Division before. Prior to this, the club gained promotion to first division in 1992, but lost its place because of points reduction, due to disturbances between the fans and horse-mounted police.

== Titles ==
- Uruguayan Primera División: 0

Amateur Era (0):
Professional Era (0):

- Segunda División Uruguay: 1

1993

- Tercera División Uruguay: 1

1989

== Special kits ==
1994, 1995
1994, 1995 away
