= 2010–11 in Uruguayan football =

Football in Uruguay
- Season: 2010–11

== National leagues ==
=== Primera División ===
- Apertura champion: Defensor Sporting (4th title)
  - Top scorer: Santiago García (15 goals)
- Clausura champion: Nacional (6th title)
  - Top scorer: Cristian Palacios (15 goals)
- Overall champion: Nacional (43rd title)
  - Top scorer: Santiago García (23 goals)
- International qualifiers:
  - Copa Libertadores:
    - Group Stage: Nacional and Defensor Sporting
    - Preliminary Round: Peñarol
  - Copa Sudamericana:
    - Second Stage: Nacional
    - First Stage: Fénix and Bella Vista
- Relegated: Central Español, Tacuarembó and Miramar Misiones

Source: RSSSF

=== Second Division ===
- Segunda División champion: Rentistas (4th title)
- Segunda División runners-up: Cerrito
- Top scorers: Santiago Bello and Joel Burgueño (13 goals)

==== Promotion play-offs ====
Semifinals
6	Cerro Largo	1	1	2
3	Atenas	0	0	0
5	Deportivo Maldonado	0	0	0
4	Boston River	1	0	1

Final
6	Cerro Largo (pen.)	2	2	4 (6)
4	Boston River	2	2	4 (5)

==== Promoted teams ====
- Rentistas
- Cerrito
- Cerro Largo

Source: RSSSF

== Clubs in international competitions ==
Team \ Competition	2010 Copa Sudamericana	2011 Copa Libertadores
Defensor Sporting	Round of 16	did not qualify
Liverpool	did not qualify	First Stage
Nacional	did not qualify	Second Stage
Peñarol	Round of 16	Runner up
River Plate	First Stage	did not qualify

=== Defensor Sporting ===
2010 Copa Sudamericana

August 3, 2010 First stage	Defensor Sporting (Uruguay)	2–0	(Paraguay) Olimpia	Montevideo, Uruguay
19:00 (UTC-3)	Mora 37', 71'	Report	Maldonado (yellow card) 20'; Molinas (yellow card) 86'	Stadium: Estadio Centenario; Referee: Néstor Pitana (Argentina)

September 2, 2010 First stage	Olimpia (Paraguay)	1–1	(Uruguay) Defensor Sporting	Asunción, Paraguay
21:15 (UTC-3)	Caballero (yellow card) 15'; Manzur (yellow card) 63'; Uglessich (yellow card) 69'; Ferreyra 86'; Vera (yellow card) 88'	Report	Mora 50' (yellow card) 76'; I. Risso (yellow card) 52'	Stadium: Estadio Defensores del Chaco; Referee: Enrique Osses (Chile)

September 16, 2010 Second stage	Defensor Sporting (Uruguay)	9–0	(Peru) Sport Huancayo	Montevideo, Uruguay
21:45 (UTC-3)	De Souza 1' (pen.), 47', (yellow card) 41'; M. Risso 44'; Amado 48'; Mora 46', 67' (pen.); Luna 61' (pen.), 79'; Aranda 76'	Report	Alvarenga (yellow card) 11'; Santa Cruz (yellow card) 26'; B. López (red card) 40'; Sotil (yellow card) 41'; Matto (yellow card) 60'; Flores (yellow card) 61'; Salazar (red card) 65'	Stadium: Estadio Centenario; Referee: Marcelo de Lima Henrique (Brazil)

September 22, 2010 Second stage	Sport Huancayo (Peru)	2–0	(Uruguay) Defensor Sporting	Huancayo, Peru
13:00 (UTC-5)	Masías (yellow card) 45'; D. Suárez 45' (o.g.); Ramírez 66'	Report	Silva (yellow card) 73'; Argachá (yellow card) 74'	Stadium: Estadio Huancayo; Referee: José Buitrago (Colombia)

September 28, 2010 Round of 16	Defensor Sporting (Uruguay)	1–0	(Argentina) Independiente	Montevideo, Uruguay
21:15 (UTC-3)	D. Suárez (yellow card) 55'; Gracián 65' (o.g.); De Souza (yellow card) 76'	Report	Tuzzio (yellow card) 32'; Mareque (yellow card) 55'; Silvera (yellow card) 78'; J. Velázquez (yellow card) 80'; Gracián (yellow card) 85'	Stadium: Estadio Centenario; Referee: Carlos Torres (Paraguay)

October 19, 2010 Round of 16	Independiente (Argentina)	4–2	(Uruguay) Defensor Sporting	Avellaneda, Argentina
19:20 (UTC-3)	Silvera 14'; Fredes 19'; Cabrera 28'; Godoy (yellow card) 45'; Martínez 75'; Navarro (yellow card) 85'	Report	Mora 12'; D. Rodríguez 48'; Silva (yellow card) 90'	Stadium: Estadio Libertadores de América; Referee: Wilson Seneme (Brazil)

Defensor Sporting eliminated on goal difference 3–4.

=== Liverpool ===
2011 Copa Libertadores

January 26, 2011 First Stage	Liverpool (Uruguay)	2–2	(Brazil) Grêmio	Montevideo, Uruguay
22:00 (UTC-2)	Franco 10'; Macchi (yellow card) 13', (goal) 25'; Souza Motta (yellow card) 34'; Blanes (yellow card) 70'; Alfaro (yellow card) 90'	Report	Paulão (yellow card) 3'; Lima 6', (yellow card) 77'; Douglas 14'; Marques (yellow card) 51'; Gilson (yellow card) 80'	Stadium: Estadio Centenario; Referee: Carlos Torres (Paraguay)

February 2, 2011 First Stage	Grêmio (Brazil)	3–1	(Uruguay) Liverpool	Porto Alegre, Brazil
22:00 (UTC-2)	Lima 38'; Júnior Viçosa (yellow card) 51'; Pacheco 57', 74'	Report	Álvez (yellow card) 27'; Alfaro 35'; Acosta (red card) 55'; Bonjour (yellow card) 81'	Stadium: Estádio Olímpico Monumental; Referee: Sergio Pezzotta (Argentina)

Liverpool eliminated on points 1–4.

=== Nacional ===
2011 Copa Libertadores

February 15, 2011 Second Stage	América (Mexico)	2–0	(Uruguay) Nacional	Mexico City, Mexico
21:00 (UTC-6)	Sánchez 4'; Vuoso 48'; Mosquera (yellow card) 54'	Report	Flores (yellow card) 47'; García (yellow card) 54'	Stadium: Estadio Azteca; Referee: Óscar Ruiz (Colombia)

February 23, 2011 Second Stage	Fluminense (Brazil)	0–0	(Uruguay) Nacional	Rio de Janeiro, Brazil
21:50 (UTC-3)	Conca (yellow card) 10'; Moura (yellow card) 51'; Euzébio (yellow card) 84'	Report	Fornaroli (yellow card) 5'; Cabrera (yellow card) 31'; Píriz (yellow card) 34'; García (yellow card) 62'; Lembo (yellow card) 89'	Stadium: Estádio Olímpico João Havelange; Referee: Carlos Amarilla (Paraguay)

March 2, 2011 Second Stage	Nacional (Uruguay)	0–1	(Argentina) Argentinos Juniors	Montevideo, Uruguay
20:30 (UTC-2)	Peralta (yellow card) 82'	Report	Niel 21', (yellow card) 56'; Escudero (yellow card) 28'; Laba (yellow card) 75'; Rius (yellow card) 80'	Stadium: Estadio Gran Parque Central; Referee: Antonio Arias (Paraguay)

March 15, 2011 Second Stage	Argentinos Juniors (Argentina)	0–1	(Uruguay) Nacional	Buenos Aires, Argentina
19:15 (UTC−3)	Hernández (yellow card) 62'; Escudero (yellow card) 88'	Report	García 34'; Godoy (yellow card) 42'; Viera (yellow card) 76'	Stadium: Estadio Diego Armando Maradona; Referee: Enrique Osses (Chile)

April 6, 2011 Second Stage	Nacional (Uruguay)	2–0	(Brazil) Fluminense	Montevideo, Uruguay
21:45 (UTC−3)	García 50', 67'; Godoy (yellow card) 73'; Gallardo (yellow card) 85' (yellow-red card) 86'	Report	Rafael Moura (yellow card) 90+1'	Stadium: Estadio Centenario; Referee: Óscar Ruiz (Colombia)

April 20, 2011 Second Stage	Nacional (Uruguay)	0–0	(Mexico) América	Montevideo, Uruguay
21:50 (UTC−3)	Viera (yellow card) 44'; Coates (yellow card) 60'; Marques (yellow card) 90'	Report	Rojas (yellow card) 42'; Mosquera (yellow card) 64'	Stadium: Estadio Centenario; Referee: Victor Hugo Carrillo (Peru)

Nacional eliminated by finishing in 3rd place in their group.

=== Peñarol ===
2010 Copa Sudamericana

August 31, 2010 First Stage	Barcelona (Ecuador)	0–1	(Uruguay) Peñarol	Guayaquil, Ecuador
20:15 (UTC−5)	Noir (yellow card) 37'; Hidalgo (yellow card) 49'; Nazareno (yellow card) 65'; Hurtado (yellow card) 75'; Perlaza (yellow card) 81'; Garcés (red card) 82'	Report	Albín (yellow card) 17'; Martinuccio (yellow card) 36'; Aguirregaray (yellow card) 50'; Perlaza 60' (o.g.); M. Sosa (yellow card) 68'; S. Sosa (yellow card) 84'; Estoyanoff (red card) 85'	Stadium: Estadio Monumental Banco Pichincha; Referee: Juan Soto (Venezuela)

September 14, 2010 First Stage	Peñarol (Uruguay)	2–1	(Ecuador) Barcelona	Montevideo, Uruguay
19:15 (UTC−3)	Ramis 72'; M. Sosa (yellow card) 74'; Aguirregaray (yellow card) 90'; Pacheco 90+4' (pen.)	Report	Noir (yellow card) 30'; Quiñonez (yellow card) 41'; Perlaza (yellow card) 45'; Banguera (yellow card) 54'; S. Sosa 79' (o.g.); Hurtado (yellow card) 90'	Stadium: Estadio Centenario; Referee: Heber Lopes (Brazil)

October 13, 2010 Round of 16	Goiás (Brazil)	1–0	(Uruguay) Peñarol	Goiânia, Brazil
19:30 (UTC−3)	Moura 23'; Douglas (yellow card) 81'	Report	M. Sosa (yellow card) 33'	Stadium: Estádio Serra Dourada; Referee: Diego Abal (Argentina)

October 20, 2010 Round of 16	Peñarol (Uruguay)	3–2	(Brazil) Goiás	Montevideo, Uruguay
19:30 (UTC−3)	Corujo 38'; M. Sosa 43'; Arévalo Ríos (yellow card) 45'; Martinuccio 84'	Report	Moura 17', (yellow card) 80'; Santos (yellow card) 46' (yellow-red card) 56'; Carlos Alberto 77'	Stadium: Estadio Centenario; Referee: Carlos Amarilla (Paraguay)

Peñarol eliminated on away goals.

2011 Copa Libertadores

February 24, 2011 Second stage	Independiente (Argentina)	3–0	(Uruguay) Peñarol	Avellaneda, Argentina
19:15 (UTC−3)	Galeano (yellow card) 34'; Parra 47'; Pellerano 70'; Silvera 85'	Report	Valdez (yellow card) 36'; Aguiar (yellow card) 64'	Stadium: Estadio Libertadores de América; Referee: Salvio Fagundes (Brazil)

March 1, 2011 Second stage	Godoy Cruz (Argentina)	1–3	(Uruguay) Peñarol	Mendoza, Argentina
20:15 (UTC−3)	Ramírez 31', (yellow card) 64'; Olmedo (yellow card) 90'	Report	Olivera 1', 42'; Valdez (yellow card) 4'; Aguiar (yellow card) 50', (goal) 67'; Albín (yellow card) 90+2'	Stadium: Estadio Malvinas Argentinas; Referee: Paulo Oliveira (Brazil)

March 9, 2011 Second stage	Peñarol (Uruguay)	1–0	(Ecuador) LDU Quito	Montevideo, Uruguay
20:30 (UTC−2)	Aguiar 57'; D. Rodríguez (yellow card) 63'; Freitas (yellow card) 69'	Report	Caicedo (yellow card) 16'; Barcos (yellow card) 63'; D. Calderón (yellow card) 74'; Domínguez (yellow card) 77'; Luna (yellow card) 86'; Guagua (yellow card) 90'	Stadium: Estadio Centenario; Referee: Victor Rivera (Peru)

March 17, 2011 Second stage	LDU Quito (Ecuador)	5–0	(Uruguay) Peñarol	Quito, Ecuador
19:30 (UTC−5)	Luna 22'; Vera (yellow card) 25'; W. Calderón 45+1', 78'; Valdez 58' (o.g.); Barcos 64' (pen.); Hidalgo (red card) 67'	Report	D. Rodríguez (yellow card) 42'	Stadium: Estadio Casa Blanca; Referee: Wilmar Roldan (Colombia)

March 31, 2011 Second stage	Peñarol (Uruguay)	2–1	(Argentina) Godoy Cruz	Montevideo, Uruguay
21:15 (UTC−3)	González (yellow card) 26'; Olivera 42'; D. Rodríguez (yellow card) 63'; Freitas 71'; Domingo (yellow card) 88'	Report	Russo (yellow card) 9'; C. Sánchez (yellow card) 25'; Villar (yellow card) 53'; D. Rodríguez 57' (o.g.); Ramírez (yellow card) 67'	Stadium: Estadio Centenario; Referee: Heber Lopes (Brazil)

April 12, 2011 Second stage	Peñarol (Uruguay)	0–1	(Argentina) Independiente	Montevideo, Uruguay
20:15 (UTC−3)	Olivera (red card) 84'	Report	Castillo (yellow card) 18'; Parra 34'; Assman (red card) 84'; Fredes (yellow card) 86'	Stadium: Estadio Centenario; Referee: Antonio Arias (Paraguay)

April 28, 2011 Round of 16	Peñarol (Uruguay)	1–1	(Brazil) Internacional	Montevideo, Uruguay
19:30 (UTC−3)	Valdez (yellow card) 19'; Corujo 36'; Freitas (yellow card) 52'; D. Rodríguez (yellow card) 55'; Martinuccio (yellow card) 80'	Report	Leandro Damião 65'; Tinga (yellow card) 90'	Stadium: Estadio Centenario; Referee: Carlos Torres (Paraguay)

May 5, 2011 Round of 16	Internacional (Brazil)	1–2	(Uruguay) Peñarol	Porto Alegre, Brazil
19:10 (UTC−3)	Oscar 1'; D'Alessandro (yellow card) 58'; Nei (yellow card) 67'	Report	Freitas (yellow card) 7'; Martinuccio 46'; Olivera 50'; Aguiar (yellow card) 68'; Domingo (yellow card) 90+2'	Stadium: Estádio Beira-Rio; Referee: Enrique Osses (Chile)

May 11, 2011 Quarterfinals	Peñarol (Uruguay)	2–0	(Chile) Universidad Católica	Montevideo, Uruguay
19:30 (UTC−3)	Olivera 37'; G. Rodríguez (yellow card) 65'; Freitas (yellow card) 68'; Martinuccio 90+4'	Report	Eluchans (yellow card) 55'; Parot (yellow card) 90'	Stadium: Estadio Centenario; Referee: Héctor Baldassi (Argentina)

May 19, 2011 Quarterfinals	Universidad Católica (Chile)	2–1	(Uruguay) Peñarol	Santiago, Chile
19:00 (UTC−4)	Meneses 17'; R. Gutiérrez 69'; Ormeño (yellow card) 75'	Report	Corujo (yellow card) 31'; Freitas (yellow card) 42'; Estoyanoff 85'	Stadium: Estadio San Carlos de Apoquindo; Referee: Heber Lopes (Brazil)

May 26, 2011 Semifinals	Peñarol (Uruguay)	1–0	(Argentina) Vélez Sársfield	Montevideo, Uruguay
21:50 (UTC−3)	González (yellow card) 15'; D. Rodríguez 45'; Aguiar (yellow card) 65'	Report	Martínez (yellow card) 43'; Cubero (yellow card) 47'; Zapata (yellow card) 64'	Stadium: Estadio Centenario; Referee: Carlos Amarilla (Paraguay)

June 2, 2011 Semifinals	Vélez Sársfield (Argentina)	2–1	(Uruguay) Peñarol	Buenos Aires, Argentina
21:50 (UTC−3)	Ortíz (yellow card) 44' (yellow-red card) 69'; Tobio 45+1'; Silva (yellow card) 51' (goal) 67'	Report	Mier 34'; Albín (yellow card) 84'; Estoyanoff (yellow card) 85'; G. Rodríguez (yellow card) 88'	Stadium: Estadio José Amalfitani; Referee: Enrique Osses (Chile)

June 15, 2011 Final	Peñarol (Uruguay)	0–0	(Brazil) Santos	Montevideo, Uruguay
21:50 (UTC−3)	Martinuccio (yellow card) 30'; Corujo (yellow card) 66'; González (yellow card) 76'	Report	Neymar (yellow card) 19'; Arouca (yellow card) 60'	Stadium: Estadio Centenario; Referee: Carlos Amarilla (Paraguay)

June 22, 2011 Final	Santos (Brazil)	2–1	(Uruguay) Peñarol	São Paulo, Brazil
21:50 (UTC−3)	Neymar (yellow card) 35' (goal) 47'; Zé Eduardo (yellow card) 58'; Danilo 69'	Report	González (yellow card) 31'; Corujo (yellow card) 52'; Freitas (yellow card) 74'; Durval 80' (o.g.)	Stadium: Estádio do Pacaembú; Referee: Sergio Pezzotta (Argentina)

Peñarol defeated by Santos on points 1–4.

=== River Plate ===
2010 Copa Sudamericana

August 19, 2010 First stage	Guaraní (Paraguay)	2–0	(Uruguay) River Plate	Asunción, Paraguay
19:30 (UTC−4)	Fabbro 67'; Teixeira 73'	Report	Correa (yellow card) 85'	Stadium: Estadio Defensores del Chaco; Referee: Jorge Osorio (Chile)

September 1, 2010 First stage	River Plate (Uruguay)	4–2	(Paraguay) Guaraní	Montevideo, Uruguay
20:15 (UTC−3)	Ramírez 23'; Zambrana 66'; Gaglianone (yellow card) 67'; Prieto (yellow card) 68'; Correa 74', 86'	Report	Teixeira 9'; Filippini (yellow card) 34'; Aurrecochea (yellow card) 40'; Benítez 45', (yellow card) 86'	Stadium: Estadio Centenario; Referee: Leandro Vuaden (Brazil)

River Plate eliminated on away goals.

== National teams ==
=== Senior team ===
This section covers Uruguay's senior team matches from the end of the 2010 FIFA World Cup until the end of the 2011 Copa América.

==== Friendly matches ====
13 August 2010	Angola	0–2	Uruguay	Lisbon, Portugal
21:30 (WEST)		Report	Cavani 84' (pen.); Hernández 89'	Stadium: Estádio do Restelo; Attendance: 5,000; Referee: Hugo Miguel (Portugal)

8 October 2010	Indonesia	1–7	Uruguay	Jakarta, Indonesia
20:00 (UTC+7)	Boaz 17'	Report	Cavani 35', 80', 82'; Suárez 41', 53', 69' (pen.); Eguren 57'	Stadium: Gelora Bung Karno Stadium; Attendance: 80,000; Referee: Abbas Bin Daud (Singapore)

12 October 2010	China	0–4	Uruguay	Wuhan, China
19:30 (UTC+8)		Report	Feng Xiaoting 70' (o.g.); Cavani 78'; C. Rodríguez 81'; Fernández 84'	Stadium: Wuhan Sports Center Stadium; Attendance: 50,000; Referee: Li Dong Gun (South Korea)

17 November 2010	Chile	2–0	Uruguay	Santiago, Chile
20:45 (UTC-3)	Sánchez 38'; Isla (yellow card) 67'; Vidal 74'; Ponce (yellow card) 86'	Report	Gargano (yellow card) 19' (yellow-red card) 41'; Á. Pereira (yellow card) 24'; Lugano (yellow card) 28'; Cavani (yellow card) 41'	Stadium: Estadio Monumental; Attendance: 45,000; Referee: Carlos Torres (Paraguay)

25 March 2011	Estonia	2–0	Uruguay	Tallinn, Estonia
19:00 (UTC+2)	Vassiljev 62'; Zahovaiko 66'; Kink (yellow card) 71'	Report		Stadium: A. Le Coq Arena; Attendance: 7,000; Referee: Antti Munnuka (Finland)

29 March 2011	Republic of Ireland	2–3	Uruguay	Dublin, Republic of Ireland
19:45 (UTC+1)	Long 15'; Fahey 49' (pen.); O'Dea (yellow card) 54'	Report	Lugano 12', (yellow card) 84'; Cavani 22', (yellow card) 71'; Hernández 39'	Stadium: Aviva Stadium; Attendance: 40,000; Referee: Saïd Ennjimi (France)

29 May 2011	Germany	2–1	Uruguay	Sinsheim, Germany
20:00 (UTC+2)	Gómez 20'; Schürrle 35'	Report	Gargano 48'; Suárez (yellow card) 86'	Stadium: Rhein-Neckar-Arena; Attendance: 25,655; Referee: Olegário Benquerença (Portugal)

===== Copa Confraternidad de Antel =====
8 June 2011 Final	Uruguay	1–1 (4–3 p)	Netherlands	Montevideo, Uruguay
15:30 (UTC-3)	Pérez (yellow card) 23'; M. Pereira (yellow card) 75'; Suárez 81'	Report	Strootman (yellow card) 26'; N. De Jong (yellow card) 57'; Kuyt 90+1'	Stadium: Estadio Centenario; Attendance: 50,000; Referee: Néstor Pittana (Argentina)
	Penalties
	Cavani (penalty scored); Hernández (penalty scored); Victorino (penalty scored); Lodeiro (penalty missed); Á. Pereira (penalty scored)		Van Persie (penalty missed); Schaars (penalty scored); L. De Jong (penalty scored); Elia (penalty missed); Heitinga (penalty scored)

===== Copa 100 Años del Banco de Seguros del Estado =====
23 June 2011 Final	Uruguay	3–0	Estonia	Rivera, Uruguay
19:30 (UTC-3)	Cáceres 12'; Reintam 55' (o.g.); Lodeiro 71'	Report		Stadium: Estadio Atilio Paiva Olivera; Attendance: 25,000; Referee: Saúl Laverni (Argentina)

==== Copa América ====
4 July 2011 Group Stage	Uruguay	1–1	Peru	San Juan, Argentina
19:15 (UTC-3)	Suárez 45+1'; Cáceres (yellow card) 81'	Report	Guerrero 23', (yellow card) 25'; Acasiete (yellow card) 50'; Cruzado (yellow card) 81'; Vargas (yellow card) 83'	Stadium: Estadio del Bicentenario; Attendance: 25,000; Referee: Wilmar Roldán (Colombia)

8 July 2011 Group Stage	Uruguay	1–1	Chile	Mendoza, Argentina
19:15 (UTC-3)	Á. Pereira (yellow card) 11', (goal) 53'; Suárez (yellow card) 37'; Cáceres (yellow card) 49'; González (yellow card) 83'; Coates (yellow card) 85'	Report	Contreras (yellow card) 24'; Jara (yellow card) 37'; Sánchez (yellow card) 56', (goal) 64'; Vidal (yellow card) 65'	Stadium: Estadio Malvinas Argentinas; Attendance: 40,000; Referee: Carlos Amarilla (Paraguay)

12 July 2011 Group Stage	Uruguay	1–0	Mexico	La Plata, Argentina
21:45 (UTC-3)	Á. Pereira 14'; Coates (yellow card) 90+1'	Report	Aguilar (yellow card) 40'; Mier (yellow card) 63'; Márquez (yellow card) 80'	Stadium: Estadio Ciudad de La Plata; Attendance: 35,000; Referee: Raúl Orosco (Bolivia)

16 July 2011 Quarterfinals	Argentina	1–1 (4–5 p)	Uruguay	Santa Fe, Argentina
19:15 (UTC-3)	Zabaleta (yellow card) 9'; Higuaín 17'; Mascherano (yellow card) 50' (yellow-red card) 87'; G. Milito (yellow card) 70'; Burdisso (yellow card) 72'; Gago (yellow card) 93'; Tevez (yellow card) 119'	Report	Pérez (yellow card) 2' (yellow-red card) 38' (goal) 5'; Cáceres (yellow card) 32'; González (yellow card) 33'	Stadium: Estadio Brigadier Estanislao López; Attendance: 30,000; Referee: Carlos Amarilla (Paraguay)
	Penalties
	Messi (penalty scored); Burdisso (penalty scored); Tevez (penalty missed); Pastore (penalty scored); Higuaín (penalty scored)		Forlán (penalty scored); Suárez (penalty scored); Scotti (penalty scored); Gargano (penalty scored); Cáceres (penalty scored)

19 July 2011 Semifinals	Peru	0–2	Uruguay	La Plata, Argentina
21:45 (UTC-3)	Yotún (yellow card) 1'; Balbín (yellow card) 59'; Vargas (red card) 68'; Lobatón (yellow card) 74'	Report	Suárez (yellow card) 12', (goal) 52', 57'; Gargano (yellow card) 26'; Lugano (yellow card) 66'	Stadium: Estadio Ciudad de La Plata; Attendance: 35,000; Referee: Raúl Orosco (Bolivia)

24 July 2011 Final	Uruguay	3–0	Paraguay	Buenos Aires, Argentina
16:00 (UTC-3)	Suárez 11'; M. Cáceres (yellow card) 17'; D. Pérez (yellow card) 24'; M. Pereira (yellow card) 29'; Coates (yellow card) 40'; Forlán 41', 89'	Report	V. Cáceres (yellow card) 26'; Vera (yellow card) 57'	Stadium: Estadio Monumental Antonio V. Liberti; Attendance: 60,000; Referee: Sálvio Fagundes (Brazil)

=== Uruguay U-20 ===
==== Friendly matches ====
5 August 2010	Uruguay	1–1	Venezuela	Montevideo, Uruguay
15:30 (UTC-3)	Cóccaro 86'	Report	Orozco 18'	Stadium: Estadio Luis Franzini; Attendance: 1,000; Referee: Héctor Martínez (Uruguay)

10 September 2010	Chile	2–3	Uruguay	Santiago, Chile
16:00 (UTC-4)	Vargas 72'; Martínez 79'	Report	Jones 41'; Machado 51'; Soto 82'	Stadium: Estadio Municipal de La Pintana; Attendance: 7,000; Referee: Carlos Chandía (Chile)

11 September 2010	Chile	2–2	Uruguay	Santiago, Chile
19:15 (UTC-4)	Muñoz 43'; Harbottle 68'	Report	Jones 38'; Pírez 86'	Stadium: Estadio Nacional de Chile; Attendance: 10,000; Referee: Carlos Chandía (Chile)

28 September 2010	Uruguay	0–0	Chile	Montevideo, Uruguay
16:30 (UTC-3)		Report		Stadium: Jardines del Hipódromo; Attendance: 100; Referee: Darío Ubriaco (Uruguay)

30 September 2010	Uruguay	5–0	Chile	Florida, Uruguay
21:00 (UTC-3)	Luna 21'; Jones 34'; Cepellini 52'; Aneff 74', 87'	Report		Stadium: Estadio Campeones Olímpicos; Attendance: 1,000; Referee: Luis Buorgeaud (Uruguay)

5 October 2010	Uruguay	1–1	Peru	Montevideo, Uruguay
16:00 (UTC-3)	Machado 79'	Report	Trujillo 35'	Stadium: Parque Capurro; Attendance: 1,200; Referee: Héctor Martínez (Uruguay)

7 October 2010	Uruguay	1–0	Peru	Montevideo, Uruguay
16:00 (UTC-3)	Jones 89'	Report		Stadium: Jardines del Hipódromo; Attendance: 2,800; Referee: Yimmy Álvarez (Uruguay)

12 October 2010	Peru	1–0	Uruguay	Arequipa, Peru
20:00 (UTC-5)	Callens 71'	Report		Stadium: Estadio Monumental Virgen de Chapi; Attendance: 10,000; Referee: Georges Buckley (Peru)

14 October 2010	Peru	2–1	Uruguay	Moquegua, Peru
20:00 (UTC-5)	Callens 43'; Platero 68' (o.g.)	Report	Prieto 90+2'	Stadium: Estadio 25 de Noviembre; Attendance: 8,000; Referee: Georges Buckley (Peru)

4 July 2011	Uruguay	1–1	Saudi Arabia	Campinas, Brazil
15:00 (UTC-3)	Cepellini 37'	Report	Ghaleb 5'	Stadium: Estádio Brinco de Ouro da Princesa; Attendance: 100; Referee: Heber Lopes (Brazil)

7 July 2011	Uruguay	3–0	Saudi Arabia	Campinas, Brazil
15:00 (UTC-3)	Arias 22'; Texeira 63'; F. Rodríguez 82'	Report		Stadium: Estádio Brinco de Ouro da Princesa; Attendance: 500; Referee: Heber Lopes (Brazil)

11 July 2011	Uruguay	7–0	Guatemala	Canelones, Uruguay
15:00 (UTC-3)	Vecino 21', 57'; Luna 27', 42'; Texeira 35'; Cepellini 69'; Mayada 82'	Report		Stadium: Complejo Uruguay Celeste; Attendance: 0 Referee: Héctor Martínez (Uruguay)

13 July 2011	Uruguay	2–0	Guatemala	Flores, Uruguay
15:00 (UTC-3)	Texeira 68'; Polenta 76' (pen.)	Report		Stadium: Estadio Juan Antonio Lavalleja; Attendance: 5,000; Referee: Andrés Cunha (Uruguay)

===== Copa Integración Latinoamericana =====
25 July 2010 Group Stage	Uruguay	2–1	Mexico	Asunción, Paraguay
22:00 (UTC-3)	Jones 15'; N. Rodríguez 87'	Report	Píñón 61'	Stadium: Estadio Defensores del Chaco; Attendance: 1,000; Referee: Carlos Galeano (Paraguay)

27 July 2010 Group Stage	Uruguay	0–1	Argentina	Asunción, Paraguay
20:00 (UTC-3)		Report	Hoyos 15'; Galucci (yellow card) 25' (yellow-red card) 90+2'	Stadium: Estadio Dr. Nicolás Leoz; Attendance: 100; Referee: Antonio Arias (Paraguay)

31 July 2010 Third place play-off	Paraguay	2–1	Uruguay	Asunción, Paraguay
20:00 (UTC-3)	Alborno 27' (pen.); Benítez 77'	Report	Aneff 57'	Stadium: Estadio General Pablo Rojas; Attendance: 5,000; Referee: Carlos Galeano (Paraguay)

===== Copa Alcaldía de Medellín =====
18 October 2010 Group Stage	Colombia	1–2	Uruguay	Medellín, Colombia
16:00 (UTC-5)	Pereira (red card) 70'; S. Arias 90+4'	Report	Machado 52', 90'; Ichazo (red card) 90+4'	Stadium: Estadio Atanasio Girardot; Attendance: 7,000; Referee: Óscar Gutiérrez (Colombia)

20 October 2010 Group Stage	Chile	1–1	Uruguay	Medellín, Colombia
16:00 (UTC-5)	Pinto 32'	Report	Cepellini 71'	Stadium: Estadio Atanasio Girardot; Attendance: 500; Referee: Óscar Gutiérrez (Colombia)

24 October 2010 Final	Mexico	2–2 (6–5 p)	Uruguay	Medellín, Colombia
15:30 (UTC-5)	De Buen 30'; Villalobos 38'; Uriel (red card) 45+1'; Araujo (red card) 60'	Report	Cepellini 72'; Melazzi 87'	Stadium: Estadio Atanasio Girardot; Attendance: 500; Referee: Wilmar Roldán (Colombia)
	Penalties
	Ramos (penalty scored); Villalbos (penalty missed); Ibáñez (penalty scored); Rivera (penalty scored); Piñón (penalty scored); Gámez (penalty scored); Loera (penalty scored)		(penalty scored) Cepellini; (penalty scored) Vecino; (penalty scored) Jones; (penalty missed) S. Rodríguez; (penalty scored) N. Rodríguez; (penalty scored) Prieto; (penalty missed) Ramírez

===== Copa Aerosur =====
16 November 2010 Group Stage	Uruguay	0–0	Colombia	Montero, Bolivia
19:00 (UTC-4)		Report		Stadium: Estadio Gilberto Parada; Attendance: 200; Referee: Abdul Kabia (Sierra Leone)

18 November 2010 Group Stage	Bolivia	3–1	Uruguay	Santa Cruz, Bolivia
21:00 (UTC-4)	Chunmacero 44', 58', 79'	Report	Gallegos 31'	Stadium: Estadio Ramón Aguilera; Attendance: 10,000; Referee: Ilboudo Paulin (Burkina Faso)

20 November 2010 Fifth place play-off	Uruguay	1–2	Chile	Santa Cruz, Bolivia
16:00 (UTC-4)	Barreto 42'	Report	Andia 45+1'; Carrasco 64'	Stadium: Estadio Juan Carlos Durán; Attendance: 500; Referee: Csak Janos (Hungary)

===== 100 Años de la Camiseta Celeste trophy =====
1 December 2010 Final	Uruguay	1–1 (3–4 p)	Argentina	Montevideo, Uruguay
16:45 (UTC-3)	D. Rodríguez (red card) 66'; Vecino 87'	Report	Cardozo 23'; Martínez (red card) 53'	Stadium: Estadio Belvedere; Attendance: 5,000; Referee: Jorge Larrionda (Uruguay)
	Penalties
	Aneff (penalty scored); Vecino (penalty scored); Plattero (penalty missed); Pereira (penalty scored); N. Rodríguez (penalty missed)		(penalty scored) Ferreyra; (penalty scored) Viola; (penalty scored) Pezzella; (penalty scored) Díaz; (penalty missed) González Pírez

===== Suwon Cup =====
Team	Pld	W	W	L	GF	GA	GD	Pts
Uruguay	3	1	2	0	4	3	+1	5
Nigeria	3	1	1	1	6	6	0	4
South Korea	3	1	1	1	2	2	0	4
New Zealand	3	1	0	2	4	5	−1	3

4 May 2011 Round 1	New Zealand	0–1	Uruguay	Suwon, South Korea
16:30 (UTC+9)		Report	Rolán 75'	Stadium: Suwon World Cup Stadium; Attendance: 1,000; Referee: Kim Dong-Jin (South Korea)

7 May 2011 Round 2	Nigeria	2–2	Uruguay	Suwon, South Korea
16:30 (UTC+9)	Daniel 17'; Kayode 90+5'	Report	Lores 23'; Machado 84'	Stadium: Suwon Sports Complex; Attendance: 1,000; Referee: Kim Dong-Jin (South Korea)

9 May 2011 Round 3	South Korea	1–1	Uruguay	Suwon, South Korea
16:30 (UTC+9)	Lee Jong-Ho 18'	Report	Machado 53'	Stadium: Suwon World Cup Stadium; Attendance: 15,000; Referee: Kim Dong-Jin (South Korea)

==== Qualifiers for Olympic Games and World Cup ====
16 January 2011 First Group Stage	Argentina	2–1	Uruguay	Arequipa, Peru
15:00 (UTC-5)	Zuculini (yellow card) 24'; Funes Mori (yellow card) 53'; Hoyos 58'; Iturbe 90+1'	Report	Luna (yellow card) 12'; Polenta 38'; Pereira (yellow card) 45'; F. Rodríguez (yellow card) 63'; N. Rodríguez (yellow card) 84'	Stadium: Estadio Monumental Virgen de Chapi; Attendance: 30,000; Referee: Wilmar Roldán (Colombia)

19 January 2011 First Group Stage	Venezuela	1–1	Uruguay	Arequipa, Peru
19:40 (UTC-5)	Villarroel (yellow card) 20'; Reyes 20'; Lima (yellow card) 53'; Martínez (yellow card) 78'	Report	F. Rodríguez 58'	Stadium: Estadio Monumental Virgen de Chapi; Attendance: 28,000; Referee: Raúl Orosco (Bolivia)

22 January 2011 First Group Stage	Chile	0–4	Uruguay	Arequipa, Peru
17:10 (UTC-5)	Magaña (yellow card) 31'; Opazo (red card) 89'	Report	Cepellini 10', 44'; F. Rodríguez (yellow card) 66'; Ichazo (yellow card) 69'; Luna 73'; Polenta 77'	Stadium: Estadio Monumental Virgen de Chapi; Attendance: 10,000; Referee: Omar Ponce (Ecuador)

27 January 2011 First Group Stage	Peru	2–0	Uruguay	Arequipa, Peru
20:10 (UTC-5)	Ojeda 14', (yellow card) 31'; Donayre 70'; Zapata (yellow card) 90'	Report	Cepellini (yellow card) 39'; Cayetano (yellow card) 65'; Prieto (yellow card) 75'	Stadium: Estadio Monumental Virgen de Chapi; Attendance: 15,000; Referee: Omar Ponce (Ecuador)

31 January 2011 Final Stage	Uruguay	1–0	Colombia	Arequipa, Peru
16:50 (UTC-5)	Luna 42'; Pereira (yellow card) 54'; Arias (yellow card) 89'	Report	Moreno (yellow card) 42' (yellow-red card) 47'; Franco (yellow card) 70'	Stadium: Estadio Monumental Virgen de Chapi; Attendance: 5,000; Referee: Diego Abal (Argentina)

3 February 2011 Final Stage	Uruguay	1–1	Ecuador	Arequipa, Peru
16:50 (UTC-5)	Mayada 17'; Cabrera (yellow card) 34'; Cepellini (yellow card) 41'	Report	Arroyo (yellow card) 22'; Narváez (yellow card) 30'; Montaño 59'	Stadium: Estadio Monumental Virgen de Chapi; Attendance: 6,000; Referee: Antonio Arias (Paraguay)

6 February 2011 Final Stage	Uruguay	1–0	Chile	Arequipa, Peru
15:50 (UTC-5)	Arias (yellow card) 9'; Pereira (yellow card) 31'; Luna 37'; Polenta (yellow card) 44'; Cepellini (yellow card) 68'	Report	Opazo (yellow card) 24'; Reyes (yellow card) 35'; Marquez (yellow card) 61'	Stadium: Estadio Monumental Virgen de Chapi; Attendance: 20,000; Referee: Wilson Seneme (Brazil)

9 February 2011 Final Stage	Uruguay	1–0	Argentina	Arequipa, Peru
21:10 (UTC-5)	Vecino 64'	Report	Nervo (yellow card) 87'; Díaz (yellow card) 89'; L. Rodríguez (yellow card) 90+2'	Stadium: Estadio Monumental Virgen de Chapi; Attendance: 10,000; Referee: Raúl Orosco (Bolivia)

12 February 2011 Final Stage	Uruguay	0–6	Brazil	Arequipa, Peru
21:10 (UTC-5)	Platero (yellow card) 2'; Cayetano (yellow card) 22'; Luna (red card) 43'; Polenta (yellow card) 55'	Report	Casemiro (yellow card) 19'; Saimon (yellow card) 26' (yellow-red card) 47'; Lucas 40', 42', 80', (yellow card) 80'; Danilo 50'; Gabriel (yellow card) 57'; Neymar 58', 61'	Stadium: Estadio Monumental Virgen de Chapi; Attendance: 5,000; Referee: Antonio Arias (Paraguay)

=== Uruguay U-17 ===
==== Friendly matches ====
8 September 2010	Chile	3–4	Uruguay	Santiago, Chile
16:00 (UTC-4)	Páez 29'; Ravello 33' (pen.), 81'	Report	Mascia 13', 55' (pen.); País 19'; Álvarez 46'	Stadium: Estadio Municipal de La Pintana; Attendance: 700; Referee: Carlos Chandía (Chile)

9 September 2010	Chile	2–2	Uruguay	Santiago, Chile
16:00 (UTC-4)	Páez 41'; Ravello 55'	Report	Álvarez 13'; Méndez 77'	Stadium: Estadio Municipal de La Pintana; Attendance: 500; Referee: Carlos Chandía (Chile)

28 September 2010	Uruguay	2–1	Chile	Montevideo, Uruguay
14:30 (UTC-3)	Cortalezzi 18'; Mascía 39'	Report	Páez 57'	Stadium: Jardines del Hipódromo; Attendance: 100; Referee: Darío Ubriaco (Uruguay)

30 September 2010	Uruguay	3–0	Chile	Florida, Uruguay
19:00 (UTC-3)	San Martín 21'; Méndez 43', 61'	Report		Stadium: Estadio Campeones Olímpicos; Attendance: 1,000; Referee: Luis Buorgeaud (Uruguay)

16 November 2010	Uruguay	2–3	Argentina	Minas, Uruguay
19:00 (UTC-2)	Rodríguez 57'; Poggi 68'	Report	Pugh 21'; Ferreira 53'; Pinto 76'	Stadium: Estadio Juan Antonio Lavalleja; Attendance: 2,000; Referee: Luis Buorgeaud (Uruguay)

18 November 2010	Uruguay	4–2	Argentina	Montevideo, Uruguay
17:00 (UTC-2)	Cortalezzi 29', 57'; Mascia 43'; Méndez 82'	Report	Ocampo 34'; Ferreira 61'	Stadium: Estadio Gran Parque Central; Attendance: 500; Referee: Héctor Martínez (Uruguay)

7 December 2010	Argentina	1–3	Uruguay	Quilmes, Argentina
17:00 (UTC-3)	Pugh 21'	Report	Alonso 11', 68'; López 63'	Stadium: Estadio Dr. José Luis Meiszner; Attendance: 110; Referee: Rafael Furchi (Argentina)

9 December 2010	Argentina	1–1	Uruguay	Buenos Aires, Argentina
17:00 (UTC-3)	Ferreira 15'	Report	Álvarez 63'	Stadium: Complejo Ezeiza; Attendance: 0 Referee: Diego Abal (Argentina)

12 December 2010	Peru	3–2	Uruguay	Lima, Peru
12:45 (UTC-5)	Flores 17', 59', 67'	Report	San Martín 44'; Peralta 73'	Stadium: Estadio Nacional; Attendance: 55,000; Referee: Víctor Hugo Carrillo (Peru)

14 December 2010	Peru	1–1	Uruguay	Lima, Peru
15:30 (UTC-5)	Flores 20'	Report	San Martín 53'	Stadium: Complejo F.P.F. Attendance: 0 Referee: Víctor Hugo Carrillo (Peru)

28 May 2011	Uruguay	0–0	Mexico	Montevideo, Uruguay
12:00 (UTC-3)		Report		Stadium: Parque Saroldi; Attendance: 2,000; Referee: Héctor Martínez (Uruguay)

30 May 2011	Uruguay	6–2	Mexico	Montevideo, Uruguay
09:30 (UTC-3)	Charamoni 7', 29', 59', 87'; Mascia 35'; Peralta 71'	Report	Bueno 42'; Celada 64'	Stadium: Parque Viera; Attendance: 500; Referee: Andrés Cunha (Uruguay)

7 June 2011	Brazil	0–4	Uruguay	Rio de Janeiro, Brazil
20:00 (UTC-3)		Report	Velázquez 41'; Mascia 69'; San Martín 81'; Aguirre 88'	Stadium: Complejo CBF; Attendance: 100; Referee: Marcelo de Lima Henrique (Brazil)

9 June 2011	Brazil	6–0	Uruguay	Rio de Janeiro, Brazil
20:00 (UTC-3)	Piazon 3'; Guilherme 9'; Adryan 68'; Misael 74', 83'; Pedro Paulo 77'	Report		Stadium: Complejo CBF; Attendance: 300; Referee: Marcelo de Lima Henrique (Brazi)

15 June 2011	Uruguay	1–2	Australia	Pachuca, Mexico
17:00 (UTC-5)	Aguirre 89'	Report	Kamara 48', 57'	Stadium: Tuzos' Sportcenter; Attendance: 100; Referee: Néant Alioum (Cameroon)

===== Torneo Internacional de la Universidad Católica =====
12 January 2011 Group Stage	Uruguay	1–2	Mexico	Santiago, Chile
17:00 (UTC-5)	San Martín 7'	Report	Madrigal 31', 49'	Stadium: Estadio San Carlos de Apoquindo; Attendance: 200; Referee: Pablo Pozo (Chile)

16 January 2011 Final	Uruguay	1–0	Mexico	Santiago, Chile
17:00 (UTC-5)	Rodríguez 15'	Report		Stadium: Estadio San Carlos de Apoquindo; Attendance: 700; Referee: Carlos Chandía (Chile)

==== Qualifiers for Pan American Games and World Cup ====
15 March 2011 First Stage	Bolivia	0–2	Uruguay	Ambato, Ecuador
19:10 (UTC-6)	Alpire (yellow card) 11'; F. Rodríguez (yellow card) 45'; Añez (yellow card) 69'; Mejido (yellow card) 90'	Report	Mascia 17', 26'; Furia (yellow card) 31'	Stadium: Estadio Bellavista; Attendance: 1,000; Referee: Julio Quintana (Paraguay)

18 March 2011 First Stage	Argentina	1–2	Uruguay	Riobamba, Ecuador
16:00 (UTC-6)	Andrada 41' (pen.); Ferreyra (yellow card) 49' (yellow-red card) 58'; Paredes (yellow card) 90+3'	Report	Mascia 36'; San Martín (yellow card) 86' (goal) 87'	Stadium: Estadio Olímpico de Riobamba; Attendance: 1,200; Referee: Ricardo Marques (Brazil)

21 March 2011 First Stage	Ecuador	1–0	Uruguay	Latacunga, Ecuador
17:00 (UTC-6)	Somoza 15'; Corozo (yellow card) 50'	Report	Mascia (yellow card) 40'; Velázquez (yellow card) 51'; Pais (yellow card) 77'	Stadium: Estadio La Cocha; Attendance: 8,000; Referee: Patricio Polic (Chile)

24 March 2011 First Stage	Uruguay	0–3	Peru	Latacunga, Ecuador
17:00 (UTC-6)	Gorga (yellow card) 49'; Carrera (yellow card) 58'; Poggi (yellow card) 74'; Moreira (yellow card) 87'	Report	Flores (yellow card) 20', (goal) 38'; Cartagena (yellow card) 36'; Benincasa 50'; Polo 66'	Stadium: Estadio La Cocha; Attendance: 500; Referee: Patricio Polic (Chile)

28 March 2011 Final Stage	Brazil	0–0	Uruguay	Latacunga, Ecuador
20:10 (UTC-6)	Misael (yellow card) 34'; Josué (yellow card) 38' (yellow-red card) 65'; Emerson (yellow card) 55'; Wallace (yellow card) 76'	Report	Ratti (yellow card) 9'	Stadium: Estadio La Cocha; Attendance: 8,000; Referee: Juan Quintana (Paraguay)

31 March 2011 Final Stage	Argentina	1–1	Uruguay	Quito, Ecuador
20:10 (UTC-6)	Andrada 70'; Ocampo (yellow card) 89'; Iñiguez (yellow card) 90+1'	Report	Padilla 76' (o.g.); Álvarez (yellow card) 80'; Velázquez (yellow card) 87'; Ratti (yellow card) 90'	Stadium: Estadio Olímpico Atahualpa; Attendance: 3,000; Referee: Diego Lara (Ecuador)

3 April 2011 Final Stage	Paraguay	1–3	Uruguay	Latacunga, Ecuador
15:50 (UTC-6)	D. González (yellow card) 12'; Píris (yellow card) 13'; Ovelar (yellow card) 52' (yellow-red card) 60'; Pérez (yellow card) 54'; Florenciáñez (yellow card) 56'; Caballero 78'; Díaz (yellow card) 90'	Report	Aguirre 22'; Álvarez 59'; Mascia 75'	Stadium: Estadio La Cocha; Attendance: 1,000; Referee: Patricio Polic (Chile)

6 April 2011 Final Stage	Uruguay	3–2	Colombia	Quito, Ecuador
15:50 (UTC-6)	Mascia 24', 36' (pen.); Ratti (yellow card) 37' (yellow-red card) 80'; Silva 82'	Report	Mena (yellow card) 10' (yellow-red card) 34'; Garcés 39', 69'	Stadium: Estadio Olímpico Atahualpa; Attendance: 2,000; Referee: Mayker Gómez (Venezuela)

9 April 2011 Final Stage	Ecuador	1–1	Uruguay	Quito, Ecuador
18:00 (UTC-6)	Cevallos 58' (pen.)	Report	San Martín 19'; Cubero (yellow card) 57'	Stadium: Estadio Casa Blanca; Attendance: 1,000; Referee: Héctor Parra (Colombia)

==== World Cup ====
18 June 2011 Group Stage	Uruguay	3–0	Canada	Pachuca, Mexico
18:00 (UTC-5)	Mascia 52'; Méndez 85' (pen.); Álvarez 90+3'	Report	Polakiewicz (yellow card) 83'	Stadium: Estadio Hidalgo; Attendance: 12,699; Referee: Alexey Nikolaev (Russia)

21 June 2011 Group Stage	Uruguay	1–0	Rwanda	Pachuca, Mexico
15:00 (UTC-5)	Mascia (yellow card) 84'; Pais 90+5'	Report	Buteera (yellow card) 55'; Bayisinge (yellow card) 60'; Rusheshangoga (yellow card) 67'	Stadium: Estadio Hidalgo; Attendance: 12,999; Referee: Svein Oddvar Moen (Norway)

24 June 2011 Group Stage	Uruguay	0–2	England	Torreón, Mexico
15:00 (UTC-5)		Report	Forster-Caskey (yellow card) 34'; Chalobah 45'; Jackson (yellow card) 57'; Clayton 58'; Smith (yellow card) 62'; Hope (yellow card) 67'	Stadium: Estadio Corona; Attendance: 11,410; Referee: Ali Hamad Al-Badwawi (United Arab Emirates)

29 June 2011 Round of 16	Congo	1–2	Uruguay	Morelia, Mexico
18:00 (UTC-5)	Binguila 53'; Kounkou (yellow card) 62'; Mpassi (yellow card) 64'; Mayanith (yellow card) 85'	Report	Varela (yellow card) 21'; Aguirre (yellow card) 61'; Olivera 65', (yellow card) 66'; Silva 86'	Stadium: Estadio Morelos; Attendance: 12,350; Referee: Raymon Bogle (Jamaica)

3 July 2011 Quarterfinals	Uruguay	2–0	Uzbekistan	Monterrey, Mexico
15:00 (UTC-5)	Charamoni 29', (yellow card) 38'; Varela (yellow card) 46'; Aguirre 64'; Rodríguez (yellow card) 89'	Report	Ubaydullaev (yellow card) 75'	Stadium: Estadio Universitario; Attendance: 11,015; Referee: Néant Alioum (Cameroon)

7 July 2011 Semifinals	Uruguay	3–0	Brazil	Guadalajara, Mexico
15:00 (UTC-5)	Álvarez 20' (pen.), (yellow card) 67'; Furia (yellow card) 65'; San Martín 72'; Cubero (yellow card) 83'; Méndez 90+5', (yellow card) 90+6'	Report	Emerson (yellow card) 45+3'; Bonatini (yellow card) 65'; Matheus (yellow card) 89'	Stadium: Estadio Omnilife; Attendance: 29,315; Referee: Alexey Nikolaev (Russia)

10 July 2011 Final	Uruguay	0–2	Mexico	Mexico City, Mexico
18:00 (UTC-5)	Méndez (yellow card) 17'; Silva (yellow card) 57'; Cubero (yellow card) 66'	Report	Briseño 31'; Casillas 90+2'	Stadium: Estadio Azteca; Attendance: 98,943; Referee: Svein Oddvar Moen (Norway)

=== Uruguay U-16 ===
==== Friendly matches ====
===== Montaigu Tournament =====
20 April 2011 Group Stage	England	5–0	Uruguay	La Tranche-sur-Mer, France
18:30 (UTC+2)	Shaw 1'; Houghton 7'; D. Cole 11'; Robinson 56'; Moli 74'	Report		Stadium: Stade de l'Atlantique; Attendance: 100; Referee: Stéphane Lannoy (France)

21 April 2011 Group Stage	Guinea	3–1	Uruguay	La Tranche-sur-Mer, France
18:30 (UTC+2)	Touré 19'; Camara 28'; Bah 67'	Report	Peña 71'	Stadium: Stade de l'Atlantique; Attendance: 100; Referee: Stéphane Lannoy (France)

23 April 2011 Group Stage	Uruguay	2–3	United Arab Emirates	Mouilleron-le-Captif, France
15:00 (UTC+2)	Otormín 57'; Peña 71'	Report	Al Hammadi 11'; Matar 25'; Abdulrahman 90+1' (pen.)	Stadium: Allée des Châtaigniers; Attendance: 100; Referee: Stéphane Lannoy (France)

25 April 2011 Seventh place play-off	United States	4–1	Uruguay	Saint-Hilaire-de-Loulay, France
15:00 (UTC+2)	Corriveau 18'; Arriola 29'; De La Torre 67', 81'	Report	Peña 35'	Stadium: Saint-Hilaire Field; Attendance: 100; Referee: Stéphane Lannoy (France)

=== Uruguay U-15 ===
==== Friendly matches ====
===== Torneo Internacional Juvenil Tahuichi Aguilera =====
16 January 2011 Final Group	Uruguay	0–4	Colombia	Santa Cruz, Bolivia
17:00 (UTC-5)		Report	Gutiérrez 5', 12', 37'; Vargas 81'	Stadium: Estadio Ramón Tahuichi Aguilera; Attendance: 100; Referee: René Ortubé (Bolivia)
