= Luis Machado (footballer, born 1991) =

Uruguayan footballer (born 1991)

Personal information
- Full name: Luis Enrique Machado Mora
- Date of birth: 22 December 1991 (age 34)
- Place of birth: Paysandú, Uruguay
- Height: 1.87 m (6 ft 2 in)
- Position: Forward

Team information
- Current team: Cultural Santa Rosa

Senior career*
Years	Team	Apps	(Gls)
2008–2011	Tacuarembó	49	(11)
2011–2013	Cerro	19	(4)
2013–2018	El Tanque Sisley	47	(5)
2015	→ Rampla Juniors (loan)	11	(4)
2017	→ Aucas (loan)	?	(2)
2018	→ Deportivo Maldonado (loan)	13	(5)
2019–	Deportivo Maldonado	18	(7)

International career
2011	Uruguay U20	5	(0)
- * Club domestic league appearances and goals

Luis Enrique Machado Mora (born 22 December 1991) is a Uruguayan footballer who plays Tacuarembo Futbol Club.

== National ==
He has been capped by the Uruguay national under-20 football team for the 2011 South American Youth Championship and for the pre-squad for the 2011 FIFA U-20 World Cup.

=== U20 International goals ===
No.	Date	Venue	Opponent	Score	Result	Competition	Ref.
1.	10 September 2010	Estadio Municipal de La Pintana, Santiago, Chile	Chile	0–2	2–3	Friendly	
2.	5 October 2010	Parque Capurro, Montevideo, Uruguay	Peru	1–1	1–1	Friendly	
3.	18 October 2010	Estadio Atanasio Girardot, Medellín, Colombia	Colombia	0–1	1–2	Copa Alcaldía de Medellín	
4.	18 October 2010	Estadio Atanasio Girardot, Medellín, Colombia	Colombia	0–2	1–2	Copa Alcaldía de Medellín	
5.	7 May 2011	Suwon Sports Complex, Suwon, South Korea	Nigeria	1–2	2–2	2011 Suwon Cup	
6.	9 May 2011	Suwon World Cup Stadium, Suwon, South Korea	South Korea	1–1	1–1	2011 Suwon Cup	
