= 2014–15 Campeonato Uruguayo Primera División =

111th season of the top-tier football league in Uruguay

Liga Profesional de Primera División
- Season: 2014–15
- Champions: Nacional

The 2014–15 Liga Profesional de Primera División season, also known as the 2014–15 Copa Uruguaya or the 2014–15 Campeonato Uruguayo, was the 111th season of Uruguay's top-flight football league, and the 84th in which it was professional. Danubio was the defending champion.

== Teams ==
Locations of the 2014–15 season teams outside Montevideo.
Locations of the 2014−15 Primera División teams within Montevideo.

Club	City	Stadium	Capacity
Atenas	San Carlos	Estadio Atenas	6,000
Cerro	Montevideo	Luis Tróccoli	24,000
Danubio	Montevideo	Jardines Del Hipódromo	14,401
Defensor Sporting	Montevideo	Luis Franzini	18,000
El Tanque Sisley	Montevideo	Campeones Olímpicos	7,000
Fénix	Montevideo	Parque Capurro	5,500
Juventud	Las Piedras	Parque Artigas	12,000
Montevideo Wanderers	Montevideo	Parque Alfredo Víctor Viera	7,420
Nacional	Montevideo	Gran Parque Central	23,500
Peñarol	Montevideo	Estadio Centenario	65,235
Rampla Juniors	Montevideo	Olímpico	6,000
Racing	Montevideo	Osvaldo Roberto	8,500
Rentistas	Montevideo	Complejo Rentistas	10,600
River Plate	Montevideo	Parque Federico Omar Saroldi	5,624
Sud América	San José	Casto Martínez Laguarda	6,000
Tacuarembó	Tacuarembó	Estadio Goyenola	8,000

== Torneo Apertura ==
=== Standings ===
Pos	Team	Pld	W	D	L	GF	GA	GD	Pts	Qualification
1	Nacional	15	14	0	1	34	7	+27	42	Championship Playoffs
2	Racing	15	10	2	3	32	26	+6	32	
3	Peñarol	15	7	4	4	28	16	+12	25	
4	River Plate	15	8	1	6	26	18	+8	25	
5	El Tanque Sisley	15	6	5	4	18	18	0	23	
6	Defensor Sporting	15	6	3	6	28	22	+6	21	
7	Sud América	15	5	5	5	17	17	0	20	
8	Juventud	15	6	2	7	21	22	−1	20	
9	Atenas	15	6	2	7	18	20	−2	20	
10	Danubio	15	5	5	5	17	20	−3	20	
11	Rentistas	15	6	2	7	18	24	−6	20	
12	Montevideo Wanderers	15	6	1	8	21	21	0	19	
13	Fénix	15	5	2	8	20	26	−6	17	
14	Rampla Juniors	15	5	2	8	18	27	−9	17	
15	Cerro	15	3	2	10	10	31	−21	11	
16	Tacuarembó	15	1	4	10	17	28	−11	7	

== Torneo Clausura ==
=== Standings ===
Pos	Team	Pld	W	D	L	GF	GA	GD	Pts	Qualification
1	Peñarol	15	9	4	2	28	13	+15	31	Championship Playoffs
2	River Plate	15	9	2	4	30	17	+13	29	
3	Defensor Sporting	15	7	6	2	20	16	+4	27	
4	Danubio	15	8	2	5	17	12	+5	26	
5	Juventud	15	7	4	4	25	17	+8	25	
6	Tacuarembó	15	7	3	5	23	22	+1	24	
7	Cerro	15	7	3	5	21	23	−2	23 (Note: Cerro had 1 point deducted.)	
8	Sud América	15	5	7	3	19	19	0	22	
9	Nacional	15	6	3	6	24	21	+3	21	
10	Fénix	15	6	2	7	18	16	+2	20	
11	El Tanque Sisley	15	4	4	7	17	25	−8	16	
12	Montevideo Wanderers	15	4	3	8	19	18	+1	15	
13	Atenas	15	4	2	9	27	37	−10	14	
14	Rampla Juniors	15	4	2	9	18	28	−10	14	
15	Rentistas	15	4	2	9	16	27	−11	14	
16	Racing	15	4	1	10	17	28	−11	13	

== Aggregate table ==
Pos	Team	Pld	W	D	L	GF	GA	GD	Pts	Qualification
1	Nacional	30	20	3	7	58	28	+30	63	2016 Copa Libertadores Second Stage and 2015 Copa Sudamericana First Stage
2	Peñarol	30	16	8	6	56	29	+27	56	2016 Copa Libertadores Second Stage
3	River Plate	30	17	3	10	56	35	+21	54	2016 Copa Libertadores First Stage
4	Danubio	30	13	7	10	34	32	+2	46	2015 Copa Sudamericana First Stage
5	Defensor Sporting	30	13	9	8	48	38	+10	48	2015 Copa Sudamericana First Stage
6	Juventud	30	13	6	11	46	39	+7	45	2015 Copa Sudamericana First Stage
7	Racing	30	14	3	13	49	54	−5	45	
8	Sud América	30	10	12	8	36	36	0	42	
9	Fénix	30	11	4	15	38	42	−4	37	
10	El Tanque Sisley	30	10	9	11	35	43	−8	39	
11	Montevideo Wanderers	30	10	4	16	40	39	+1	34	
12	Atenas	30	10	4	16	45	57	−12	34	
13	Rentistas	30	10	4	16	34	51	−17	34	
14	Cerro	30	10	5	15	29	52	−23	34 (Note: Cerro had 1 point deducted.)	
15	Tacuarembó	30	8	7	15	40	50	−10	31	
16	Rampla Juniors	30	9	4	17	36	55	−19	31	

== Relegation ==
Pos	Team	2013–14 Pts	2014–15 Pts	Total Pts	Total Pld	Avg	Relegation
1	Nacional	57	63	120	60	2	
2	River Plate	58	54	112	60	1.87	
3	Peñarol	52	55	107	60	1.78	
4	Danubio	58	49	116	60	1.78	
5	Montevideo Wanderers	62	34	96	60	1.6	
6	Defensor Sporting	36	48	84	60	1.4	
7	Racing	39	45	84	60	1.4	
8	Rentistas	45	34	79	60	1.317	
9	Juventud	32	45	77	60	1.283	
10	Sud América	35	42	77	60	1.283	
11	Fénix	40	37	77	60	1.283	
12	Cerro	38	34	71	60	1.183	
13	El Tanque Sisley	33	36	69	60	1.15	
14	Atenas	—	34	34	30	1.133	Relegation to Segunda División
15	Tacuarembó	—	31	31	30	1.033	Relegation to Segunda División
16	Rampla Juniors	—	31	31	30	1.033	Relegation to Segunda División

== Championship playoff ==
Nacional and Peñarol qualified for the championship playoffs as the Apertura and Clausura winners, respectively. Additionally, Nacional re-qualified as the team with the most points in the season aggregate table. Given this situation, an initial playoff was held between the two teams. Nacional would become the season champion with a win; Peñarol needed to win the playoff to force a two-legged final.

Semi-final			Finals
			Aggregate table first place	Nacional	—	—	—
Apertura winners	Nacional	3		Nacional	—	—	—
Clausura winners	Peñarol	2

=== Semi-final ===
June 14, 2015

Nacional	3–2	Peñarol
S. Fernández 19'; I. Alonso 32' (pen.); S. Romero 111'		L. Aguiar 70', 90+2'

Nacional	Peñarol

NACIONAL:
GK	1	(Uruguay) Gustavo Munúa
CB	23	(Uruguay) Diego Polenta
CB	22	(Uruguay) Alfonso Espino
CB	2	(Uruguay) Sebastián Gorga
DM	8	(Uruguay) Diego Arismendi	(yellow card) 63'	(substituted off) 71'
MF	19	(Uruguay) Santiago Romero
MF	16	(Uruguay) Carlos De Pena		(substituted off) 88'
MF	14	(Uruguay) Gonzalo Porras
FW	30	(Uruguay) Sebastián Fernández
FW	24	(Uruguay) Iván Alonso
FW	11	(Uruguay) Leandro Barcia		(substituted off) 77'
Substitutes:
GK	25	(Uruguay) Jorge Bava
CB	4	(Uruguay) Guillermo de los Santos
DF	15	(Uruguay) Nicolás Prieto		(substituted in) 71'
AM	21	(Uruguay) Gastón Pereiro
AM	29	(Uruguay) Alejandro Tabo		(substituted in) 77'
AM	20	(Uruguay) Álvaro Recoba		(substituted in) 88'
FW	9	(Uruguay) Sebastián Taborda
Manager:
(Uruguay) Álvaro Gutiérrez

PEÑAROL:
GK	1	(Argentina) Pablo Migliore	(yellow card) 115'
RB	15	(Uruguay) Jonathan Sandoval		(substituted off) 45'
CB	4	(Uruguay) Emilio MacEachen
CB	23	(Uruguay) Carlos Valdez	(yellow card) 79'
LB	6	(Brazil) Diogo Silvestre	(yellow card) 31'	(substituted off) 45'
DM	14	(Uruguay) Sebastian Piriz
RM	24	(Uruguay) Urreta	(yellow card) 83'
LM	10	(Uruguay) Jorge Rodríguez	(yellow card) 83' (red card) 84'
AM	41	(Uruguay) Luis Aguiar
FW	8	(Uruguay) Antonio Pacheco		(substituted off) 75'
FW	17	(Uruguay) Marcelo Zalayeta
Substitutes:
GK	27	(Uruguay) Gastón Guruceaga
DF	2	(Uruguay) Gonzalo Viera
DF	13	(Uruguay) Damián Macaluso
CM	25	(Uruguay) Nahitan Nández	(yellow card) 93'	(substituted off) 46'
MF	7	(Uruguay) Hernán Novick		(substituted off) 75'
FW	33	(Uruguay) Gabriel Leyes	(yellow card) 59'	(substituted in) 46'
FW	19	(Uruguay) Juan Manuel Olivera	(red card) 67'
Manager:
(Uruguay) Pablo Bengoechea

Primera División
2014–15 champion
Nacional
45th title
