= Buteera =

Buteera is a surname. Notable people with the surname include:

- Andrew Buteera (born 1994), Rwandan footballer
- Richard Buteera, Ugandan lawyer
