= Juan San Martín =

Uruguayan footballer (born 1994)

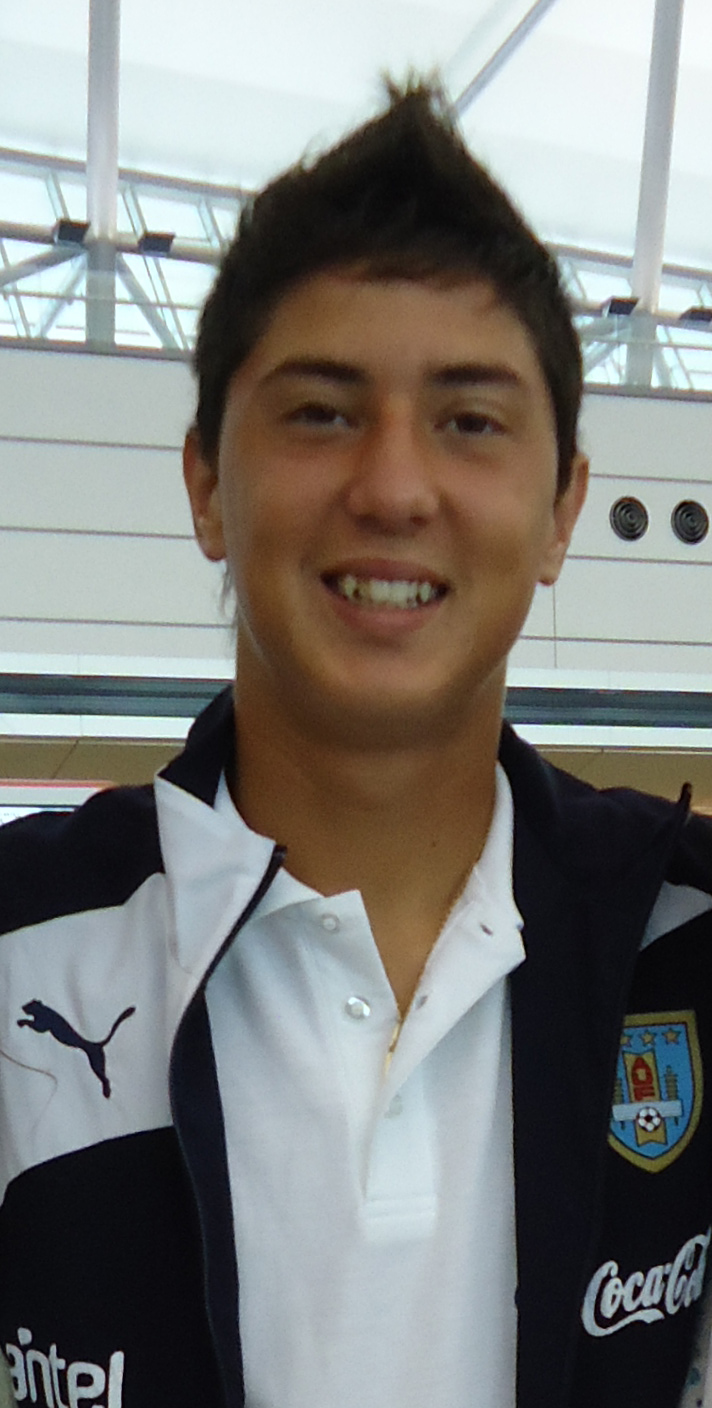
- San Martín in 2011

Personal information
- Full name: Juan Manuel San Martín Da Costa
- Date of birth: 20 January 1994 (age 32)
- Place of birth: Rivera, Uruguay
- Height: 1.79 m (5 ft 10 in)
- Position: Forward

Team information
- Current team: Real SC
- Number: 91

Youth career
- 2009−2011: Peñarol

Senior career*
Years	Team	Apps	(Gls)
2011–2012	Peñarol	0	(0)
2012–2016	Benfica B	0	(0)
2013–2014	→ Farense (loan)	11	(0)
2014–2015	→ Central Español (loan)	8	(3)
2016	→ Louletano (loan)	10	(5)
2016–2018	Louletano	54	(15)
2018	Manta	0	(0)
2018–2019	Louletano	16	(3)
2019–	Real SC	7	(1)

International career
2011	Uruguay U-17	14	(3)
- * Club domestic league appearances and goals as of 21:36, 17 October 2019 (UTC)

Juan Manuel San Martín Da Costa (born 20 January 1994) is a Uruguayan professional footballer who plays as a forward for Portuguese club Real SC.

== Club career ==
Born in Rivera, San Martín is a product of Peñarol youth system, joining them in 2009, at age 15. Two years later, reports in the press informed that he, Jim Varela and Elbio Álvarez were joining S.L. Benfica but the deal was only finalised in 2012. The transfer fee was a reported for €2.9 million by some sources, and €2.4 million by others.

In 2013, he was loaned to Farense, playing 11 league matches, without scoring. He returned to Benfica the following season, being loaned to Central Español in September 2014. In this team, he appeared in 8 games and scored 3 goals. At the end of the loan, he returned to Benfica B.

== International career ==
San Martín was part of the squad of the Uruguay U-17 that took part in the 2011 South American U17 in Ecuador and in the 2011 FIFA U-17 World Cup, playing five matches and scoring once.
