= Matías Soto (footballer) =

Uruguayan footballer (born 1991)

Personal information
- Full name: Matías Fernando Soto de Freitas
- Date of birth: 23 April 1991 (age 35)
- Place of birth: Montevideo, Uruguay
- Height: 1.84 m (6 ft 0 in)
- Position: Right back

Team information
- Current team: Rampla Juniors
- Number: 4

Senior career*
| Years | Team | Apps | (Gls) |
| 2011–2012 | Defensor Sporting | 0 | (0) |
| 2011–2012 | → Juventud (loan) | 23 | (0) |
| 2012–2017 | Juventud | 69 | (0) |
| 2017–2018 | Rampla Juniors | 48 | (1) |
| 2019 | Santa Tecla | 16 | (1) |
| 2019 | Rampla Juniors | 15 | (1) |
| 2020 | Real España | 16 | (1) |
| 2021– | Rampla Juniors | 3 | (0) |

International career
| 2010 | Uruguay U20 | | |
- * Club domestic league appearances and goals

Matías Fernando Soto de Freitas (born 23 April 1991) is a Uruguayan professional footballer who plays as a right back for Rampla Juniors.

== National ==
He has been capped by the Uruguay national under-20 football team for the Copa Aerosur.

=== International goals ===
| No. | Date | Venue | Opponent | Score | Result | Competition | Ref. |
|---|---|---|---|---|---|---|---|
| 1. | 10 September 2010 | Estadio Municipal de La Pintana, Santiago, Chile | Chile | 2–3 | 2–3 | Friendly | |
