= Sasha Aneff =

Uruguayan footballer (born 1991)

Personal information
- Full name: Sasha Alexander Aneff Medrano Rosso
- Date of birth: 26 June 1991 (age 35)
- Place of birth: Montevideo, Uruguay
- Height: 1.87 m (6 ft 1 1/2 in)
- Position: Forward

Youth career
- 2003–2009: Defensor Sporting

Senior career*
Years	Team	Apps	(Gls)
2010–2013	Defensor Sporting	5	(0)
2011–2012	→ Racing (loan)	3	(0)
2012	→ Botev Vratsa (loan)	5	(0)
2013–2015	Domžale	32	(9)
2015	→ Osijek (loan)	8	(2)
2016	Syrianska FC	4	(0)
2016–2017	NorthEast United	1	(0)

International career
2010–2011	Uruguay U20		
- * Club domestic league appearances and goals as of 18 September 2017

Sasha Alexander Aneff Medrano Rosso (born 26 June 1991 in Montevideo) is a former Uruguayan footballer.

== Youth career ==
Sasha is a product of four times Uruguayan Primera División champions Defensor Sporting. He has represented the club in various age group before making his senior team debut in 2010.

== Club career ==
Aneff started his career playing for Defensor Sporting. He made his professional debut on 6 October 2010 against C.A. Cerro.

In 2012, he was loaned out to Bulgarian side Botev Vratsa.

On 25 November 2013, he signed a new contract with Slovenian PrvaLiga side NK Domžale.

On 17 February 2015, he signed a six-month loan with Croatian side NK Osijek.

On 31 March 2016 it was announced that Sasha had signed for Superettan side Syrianska FC. After only 4 league games the club terminated his contracted on 30 May 2016.

On 24 June 2016 it was announced that he had signed for NorthEast United in the Indian Super League. On his signing head coach Sergio Farias told,"Sasha is strong, good in the air and is always on hand to pounce in the box. It is important for the squad to have a balanced mix and he definitely has the attributes we are looking for."

== International career ==
He has been capped by the Uruguay national under-20 football team for the Suwon Cup.

== Personal life ==
He is of Bulgarian descent as his grandfather and grandmother were born in Bulgaria, and married after they met in Montevideo. His family also has Argentinian origins through his maternal family. He also holds a Bulgarian passport.

== Honours ==
=== Club ===
Defensor Sporting

- Uruguayan Primera División: Runner-up (2): 2010–11, 2012–13
