= Matías Soto =

Matías Soto may refer to:

- Matías Soto (footballer)
- Matías Soto (tennis)
