= Gonzalo Barreto =

Uruguayan footballer (born 1992)

Personal information
- Full name: Gonzalo Barreto Mastropierro
- Date of birth: 22 January 1992 (age 34)
- Place of birth: Montevideo, Uruguay
- Height: 1.73 m (5 ft 8 in)
- Position: Forward

Team information
- Current team: Progreso
- Number: 19

Youth career
- 2009: Danubio

Senior career*
Years	Team	Apps	(Gls)
2009–2010	Danubio	1	(0)
2010–2015	Lazio	0	(0)
2016–2017	Danubio	45	(10)
2017	→ U. de Concepción (loan)	20	(1)
2018	Sportivo Luqueño	30	(4)
2019	Montevideo Wanderers	20	(3)
2020–2021	Rampla Juniors	25	(5)
2021	Racing Montevideo	24	(1)
2022–2024	Rampla Juniors	60	(18)
2024–	Progreso	6	(0)

International career
2007	Uruguay U15	6	(2)
2009	Uruguay U17	9	(4)
- * Club domestic league appearances and goals as of 14 September 2024

Gonzalo Barreto Mastropierro (born 22 January 1992) is a Uruguayan footballer who plays as a striker for Progreso.

== Club career ==
=== Danubio ===
Born in Montevideo, Barreto began his career with local club Danubio F.C. He started with the youth team and in 2009, at the age of 17 made his debut with the first team. His debut came in an away match against Tacuarembó, in which he came off the bench and won a decisive penalty as Danubio claimed a 2–1 victory.

=== Lazio ===
Barreto's talent attracted interest from big clubs and he quickly made the move to Europe. On 2 September 2009, Barreto went to Rome to sign a five-year deal with Lazio, who bought him for about €1.781 million. However, Barreto was not able to play for Lazio until he turned 18 in 2010, due to FIFA's restrictions regarding the transfers of minors across different continents.

=== Return to Danubio ===
In 2015 Barreto returned to Danubio F.C.

== International career ==
Barreto established himself as a star of Uruguay's youth teams. He appeared for their under-15 side in 2007

In 2009, Barreto established himself as a key player for the under-17 national team. He competed with the side in the 2009 South American Under-17 Football Championship, held in Chile, scoring twice in their opening match win over hosts Chile. Uruguay progressed to the final group stage where Barreto scored twice more, against Bolivia and Ecuador. With four goals, he finished as the second highest goalscorer in the competition.

Uruguay's good finish meant that they qualified for the 2009 FIFA U-17 World Cup, held in Nigeria. Uruguay were eliminated in the quarter-finals by Spain on penalties. Barreto successfully converted his spot-kick in the shootout. Injuries restricted him to just two appearances at the tournament.

He has been capped by the Uruguay national under-20 football team for the 2011 Copa Aerosur.

=== International goals ===
No.	Date	Venue	Opponent	Score	Result	Competition	Ref.
1.	20 November 2010	Estadio Juan Carlos Durán, Santa Cruz, Bolivia	Chile	1–0	1–2	Copa Aerosur	
