= Hector Ramirez =

Hector Ramirez or Héctor Ramírez may refer to:

- Hector Ramirez (The Bold and the Beautiful), a character on the soap opera The Bold and the Beautiful
- Hector Ramirez (comics), a character briefly taking over the mantle of Wildcat in DC Comics
- Héctor Ramírez (baseball) (born 1971), former Major League Baseball player from the Dominican Republic
- Hector Ramirez (Sunbow), a fictional TV journalist in Sunbowverse animated cartoons The Transformers, G.I Joe, and Inhumanoids
- Héctor Ramírez (gymnast), Cuban Olympic gymnast
- Héctor Ramírez (boxer), Cuban boxer
- Héctor Fernando Ramírez (died 2003), died of a heart attack in Guatemala City while being chased by a mob in what is referred to as jueves negro (Black Thursday)
- Héctor Ramírez (footballer) (born 1982), Colombian footballer
