= Nicolás Rodríguez (footballer, born 1991) =

Uruguayan footballer

Personal information
- Full name: Nicolás Alejandro Rodríguez Charquero
- Date of birth: 22 July 1991 (age 35)
- Place of birth: Montevideo, Uruguay
- Height: 1.83 m (6 ft 0 in)
- Position: Right back

Team information
- Current team: Nacional
- Number: 77

Youth career
- Montevideo Wanderers

Senior career*
Years	Team	Apps	(Gls)
2011–2012	Montevideo Wanderers	3	(0)
2012–2013	→ Cerro Largo (loan)	23	(0)
2013	Corona Brașov	1	(0)
2014–2016	Rentistas	28	(3)
2016	Plaza Colonia	13	(0)
2017–2021	River Plate	135	(11)
2022	Danubio	36	(2)
2023–2024	Defensor Sporting	56	(1)
2024–	Nacional	25	(4)

International career
2010–2011	Uruguay U20	5	(1)
- * Club domestic league appearances and goals as of 1 October 2025

Nicolás Alejandro Rodríguez Charquero (born 22 July 1991 in Montevideo) is a Uruguayan footballer who plays for Uruguayan side Nacional.

== National ==
He has been capped by the Uruguay national under-20 football team for the 2011 South American Youth Championship.

=== International goals ===
No.	Date	Venue	Opponent	Score	Result	Competition	Ref.
1.	25 July 2010	Estadio Defensores del Chaco, Asunción, Paraguay	Mexico	2–1	2–1	Copa Integración Latinoamericana	
