= Diego Benítez =

Diego Benítez may refer to:

- Diego Benítez (footballer, born 1988), Uruguayan football forward
- Diego Benítez (footballer, born 1991), Paraguayan football midfielder
