= 2014–15 in Uruguayan football =

Football in Uruguay
- Season: 2014–15

Men's football
- Primera División: TBD

== National teams ==
=== Senior team ===
This section covers Uruguay's senior team matches from the end of the 2014 FIFA World Cup to the end of the 2015 Copa América.

==== Friendly matches ====
September 5, 2014	Japan	0–2	Uruguay	Sapporo, Japan
		Report	Cavani 34'; Hernández 70'	Stadium: Sapporo Dome; Attendance: 39,294; Referee: Kim Sang-Woo (South Korea)

September 9, 2014	South Korea	0–1	Uruguay	Goyang, South Korea
		Report	Giménez 70'	Stadium: Goyang Sports Complex; Referee: Ryuji Sato (Japan)

October 10, 2014	Saudi Arabia	1–1	Uruguay	Jeddah, Saudi Arabia
	Hazazi 90'	Report	Fallatah 47' (o.g.)	Stadium: King Abdullah Sports City; Referee: Jamil Juma (Bahrain)

October 13, 2014	Oman	0–3	Uruguay	Muscat, Oman
		Report	Suárez 57', 66'; J. Rodríguez 87'	Stadium: Sultan Qaboos Sports Complex; Referee: Marai Al-Awaji (Saudi Arabia)

November 13, 2014	Uruguay	3 – 3	Costa Rica	Montevideo, Uruguay
	Suárez 50'; Giménez 64'; Cavani 67'	Report	Saborío 42'; Ruiz 51'; Venegas 90'	Stadium: Estadio Centenario; Referee: Germán Delfino (Argentina)

November 18, 2014	Chile	1–2	Uruguay	Santiago, Chile
	Sánchez 28'	Report	Rolán 45+1'; González 80'	Stadium: Estadio Monumental David Arellano; Attendance: 40,000; Referee: Carlos Vera (Ecuador)

March 28, 2015	Morocco	0–1	Uruguay	Agadir, Morocco
			Cavani 56'	Stadium: Grand Stade d'Agadir

June 6, 2015	Uruguay	5–1	Guatemala	Estadio Centenario, Montevideo

==== 2015 Copa América ====
13 June 2015 Group Stage	Uruguay	1–0	Jamaica	Estadio Regional de Antofagasta, Antofagasta
16:00 UTC-4	C. Rodríguez 52'

16 June 2015 Group Stage	Argentina	1–0	Uruguay	Estadio La Portada, La Serena
20:30 UTC-4	Agüero 56'

20 June 2015 Group Stage	Uruguay	1–1	Paraguay	Estadio La Portada, La Serena
16:00 UTC-4	Giménez 27'		Barrios 44'
