= Fraccionamiento Camino Maldonado =

- Suburb of Pando (2 fragments)
- Location in Uruguay
- Coordinates: 34°44′20″S 55°58′30″W
- Country: Uruguay
- Department: Canelones Department

Population (2004)
  - Total: 15,057
- Time zone: UTC -3
- Postal code: 91001
- Dial plan: +598 2 (+7 digits)

Fraccionamiento Camino Maldonado is a suburb of Pando. It is composed of two fragments, one at the northeast and one at the southwest of Barros Blancos. The three together form a southwestern extension of the urban area of Pando, and they all belong to the wider metropolitan area of Montevideo.

== Population ==
In 2004, the two fragments had a population of 15,057.

Year	Population
1963	3,449
1975	8,346
1985	10,082
1996	13,349
2004	15,057

Source: Instituto Nacional de Estadística de Uruguay

At the 2011 census, no separate population was given for these fragments. Instead the new population number given for Barros Blancos seems to have incorporated their population.

== Coordinates of fragments ==
- Northeast fragment: 34°44′20″S 55°58′30″W
- Southwest fragment: 34°45′50″S 56°1′20″W
