= Federico Platero =

Uruguayan footballer (born 1991)

Personal information
- Full name: Federico Platero Gozzaneo
- Date of birth: 7 February 1991 (age 35)
- Place of birth: Treinta y Tres, Uruguay
- Height: 1.88 m (6 ft 2 in)
- Position: Centre back

Team information
- Current team: Unión Española
- Number: 6

Youth career
- Defensor Sporting

Senior career*
Years	Team	Apps	(Gls)
2011–2013	Defensor Sporting	6	(0)
2012–2013	→ Juventud (loan)	19	(1)
2013–2015	Wil	44	(2)
2015	→ Osijek (loan)	2	(0)
2015–2016	Juventud	19	(0)
2016–2017	Mushuc Runa	9	(0)
2017–2018	Liverpool Montevideo	59	(5)
2019	Criciúma	14	(1)
2020–2021	Progreso	25	(1)
2021–	Unión Española	9	(0)

International career
2011	Uruguay U20	9	(0)
- * Club domestic league appearances and goals as of 16 March 2021

Federico Platero Gozzaneo (born February 7, 1991, in Treinta y Tres) is a Uruguayan footballer who plays as a defender for Unión Española.

== Club career ==
=== Defensor Sporting ===
In early 2011, he debuted with Defensor Sporting first team.

=== Juventud ===
In mid 2012, he was loaned to Juventud de Las Piedras for a season, having played 19 matches and scored one goal in his last appearance with the team against El Tanque Sisley.

=== FC Wil ===
In July 2013, Platero signed a new contract with Swiss Challenge League side FC Wil. On 21 July 2013, he debuted for Wil in a 0–3 away win against FC Chiasso when he played the whole match. His first goal came on 2 September 2013, in a 1–2 away win against FC Winterthur.

=== NK Osijek ===
On 17 February 2015, he signed a six-month loan with Croatian side NK Osijek. On 1 March 2015, he made his league debut on a 0–4 away win against NK Zagreb. He only played two matches before suffering a long injury, which hept him away of the fields till the end of the season.

In July 2015, he returned to his country to play again for Juventud de Las Piedras which qualified to the 2015 Copa Sudamericana.

== International career ==
He has been capped by the Uruguay national under-20 football team for the 2011 South American Youth Championship and for the 2011 FIFA U-20 World Cup.
