= Guzmán Pereira =

Uruguayan footballer (born 1991)

Personal information
- Full name: Ricardo Guzmán Pereira Méndez
- Date of birth: 16 May 1991 (age 35)
- Place of birth: Montevideo, Uruguay
- Height: 1.81 m (5 ft 11 in)
- Position: Midfielder

Team information
- Current team: Miramar Misiones
- Number: 14

Youth career
- Montevideo Wanderers

Senior career*
| Years | Team | Apps | (Gls) |
| 2010–2014 | Montevideo Wanderers | 68 | (3) |
| 2014–2018 | Universidad de Chile | 42 | (2) |
| 2016–2018 | → Peñarol (loan) | 56 | (0) |
| 2018–2020 | Peñarol | 39 | (1) |
| 2020–2022 | Montevideo Wanderers | 31 | (0) |
| 2022–2023 | Agropecuario | 27 | (0) |
| 2023– | Miramar Misiones | 38 | (3) |

International career^{‡}
| 2011 | Uruguay U20 | 7 | (0) |
| 2014– | Uruguay | 3 | (0) |
- * Club domestic league appearances and goals as of 7 September 2024 ‡ National team caps and goals as of 28 March 2015

Ricardo Guzmán Pereira Méndez (born 16 May 1991) is a Uruguayan footballer who plays for Miramar Misiones.

== Honours ==
=== Club ===
Universidad de Chile

- Torneo Apertura: 2014
- Supercopa de Chile: 2015
- Copa Chile: 2015

Peñarol

- Uruguayan Primera División: 2
- Uruguayan Primera División 2017, 2018

=== Individual ===
- Primera División Uruguaya Best Defensive Midfielder: 2013–14
