= Pablo Ceppelini =

Uruguayan footballer (born 1991)

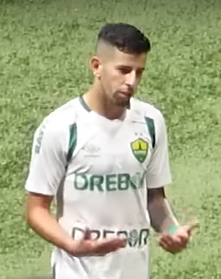
- Ceppelini with Cuiabá in 2023

Personal information
- Full name: Pablo Daniel Ceppelini Gatto
- Date of birth: 11 September 1991 (age 35)
- Place of birth: Montevideo, Uruguay
- Height: 1.76 m (5 ft 9 1/2 in)
- Position: Midfielder

Team information
- Current team: AC Bellinzona
- Number: 18

Youth career
- –2008: Bella Vista

Senior career*
| Years | Team | Apps | (Gls) |
| 2008–2010 | Bella Vista | 24 | (3) |
| 2011 | Peñarol | 0 | (0) |
| 2011–2014 | Cagliari | 9 | (0) |
| 2013 | → Lumezzane (loan) | 11 | (2) |
| 2013–2014 | → Maribor (loan) | 3 | (0) |
| 2014–2015 | Universitatea Cluj | 22 | (2) |
| 2015 | Montevideo Wanderers | 9 | (0) |
| 2016–2017 | Boston River | 59 | (12) |
| 2018–2019 | Danubio | 32 | (5) |
| 2019 | → Atlético Nacional (loan) | 42 | (10) |
| 2020–2022 | Cruz Azul | 5 | (1) |
| 2021–2022 | → Peñarol (loan) | 28 | (8) |
| 2023 | Cuiabá | 34 | (4) |
| 2024 | Atlético Nacional | 17 | (1) |
| 2025 | Alianza Lima | 26 | (2) |
| 2026– | AC Bellinzona | 3 | (0) |

International career
| 2010–2011 | Uruguay U20 | 11 | (2) |
- * Club domestic league appearances and goals as of 30 September 2026

Pablo Daniel Ceppelini Gatto (born 11 September 1991, in Montevideo) is a Uruguayan footballer who plays as a midfielder for Swiss club AC Bellinzona.

== Club career ==
He played for Bella Vista and helped them win promotion from the Segunda División Profesional, playing in both legs of their promotion play-off victory over Miramar Misiones. He subsequently played for Bella Vista in the 2010–11 Uruguayan Primera División season, before transferring to Peñarol at the halfway stage of the season.

However, Ceppelini did not actually play a game for Peñarol, and was transferred on to Italian side Cagliari on 31 January 2011 for a fee of €2,350,000, with Penarol receiving 10% of this fee. Ceppelini made three Serie A appearances in his first part-season in Italy.

In 2011–12 he made five league appearances for Cagliari.

On 2 September 2013, Ceppelini joined Slovenian team Maribor, on loan from Cagliari.

In the summer 2014 transfer window he moved from Cagliari to Universitatea Cluj.

He did not return to Cluj in 2015–16, buying out his contract to become a free agent, and was set to play for Montevideo Wanderers from Uruguay.

After playing for Wanderers in 2015/16 he moved to Boston River for the 2016 season. He moved to Danubio for 2018.

== International career ==
He played in all three of Uruguay's matches in the 2011 FIFA U-20 World Cup tournament that was held in Colombia.
