= Ariel Páez =

Chilean footballer (born 1994)

Personal information
- Full name: Ariel Esteban Páez Bergel
- Date of birth: 20 January 1994 (age 32)
- Place of birth: Los Andes, Chile
- Height: 1.71 m (5 ft 7 in)
- Position: Attacking midfielder

Youth career
- 2007–2011: Colo-Colo

Senior career*
Years	Team	Apps	(Gls)
2012	Colo-Colo	3	(0)
2012–2014	Colo-Colo B	52	(9)
2014–2015	Deportes La Serena	15	(0)
Total		70	(9)

International career
2010–2011	Chile U17	8	(1)
- * Club domestic league appearances and goals

Ariel Esteban Páez Bergel (Spanish pronunciation: [aˈɾjel esˈteβam ˈpaes]; born 20 January 1994) is a Chilean former footballer who played as an attacking midfielder.

== International career ==
Páez represented Chile U17 at the 2010 South American Games.
