= Sixto Santa Cruz =

Paraguayan footballer (born 1986)

Personal information
- Full name: Sixto Abel Santa Cruz Báez
- Date of birth: 6 November 1986 (age 39)
- Place of birth: Ypané, Paraguay
- Height: 1.84 m (6 ft 1/2 in)
- Position: Striker

Team information
- Current team: José Gálvez
- Number: 9

Youth career
- Cerro Porteño
- Sportivo Luqueño

Senior career*
Years	Team	Apps	(Gls)
2006	Sportivo Luqueño	8	(2)
2007	Juventud Ypanense	19	(6)
2008	2 de Mayo	22	(9)
2009–2010	Sport Huancayo	52	(20)
2010	Panathinaikos	o	(0)
2010	→ Aris	12	(2)
2011	→ Panserraikos	8	(4)
2011–	→ José Gálvez	9	(5)
- * Club domestic league appearances and goals as of 24 March 2008

Sixto Santa Cruz (born 6 November 1986) is a professional football striker from Paraguay. He currently plays for José Gálvez.

== Personal life ==
He is the cousin of Manchester City striker Roque Santa Cruz.
