= Juan Matto =

Paraguayan footballer (born 1977)

Personal information
- Full name: Juan de La Cruz Matto González
- Date of birth: 14 September 1977 (age 49)
- Place of birth: Itá, Paraguay
- Height: 1.84 m (6 ft 0 in)
- Position: Defender

Youth career
- Olimpia Itá

Senior career*
Years	Team	Apps	(Gls)
1995–1999	12 de Octubre		
2000–2001	Atlético Colegiales	28	(2)
2002–2003	Sport Colombia	50	(11)
2003–2004	Sportivo Luqueño	6	(0)
2004	Deportes La Serena	6	(0)
2005–2006	Unión Sunchales	45	(2)
2007	12 de Octubre	7	(0)
2007–2008	9 de Julio	21	(2)
2008–2010	Crucero del Norte	103	(3)
2010	Sport Huancayo	4	(0)
2011–2012	Crucero del Norte	6	(0)
2013–2014	Chaco For Ever	21	(0)
2014–2015	Sol de América Formosa	2	(0)
Total		299+	(20+)
- * Club domestic league appearances and goals

Juan de La Cruz Matto González (born 14 September 1977 in Itá, Paraguay) is a Paraguayan former association football defender.

== Teams ==
- (Paraguay) Olimpia Itá (youth)
- (Paraguay) 12 de Octubre 1995–1999
- (Paraguay) Atlético Colegiales 2000–2001
- (Paraguay) Sport Colombia 2002
- (Paraguay) Sportivo Luqueño 2003
- (Chile) Deportes La Serena 2004
- (Argentina) Unión de Sunchales 2005–2007
- (Paraguay) 12 de Octubre 2007
- (Argentina) 9 de Julio de Rafaela 2008
- (Argentina) Crucero del Norte 2008–2010
- (Peru) Sport Huancayo 2010
- (Argentina) Crucero del Norte 2011–2012
- (Argentina) Chaco For Ever 2013–2014
