= Nicolás Freitas =

Uruguayan footballer (born 1987)

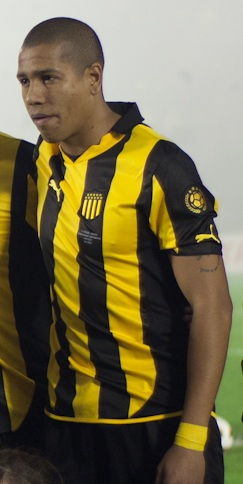

Personal information
- Full name: Nicolás Andrés Freitas Silva
- Date of birth: 8 June 1987 (age 39)
- Place of birth: Montevideo, Uruguay
- Height: 1.83 m (6 ft 0 in)
- Position: Midfielder

Team information
- Current team: Boston River
- Number: 15

Senior career*
Years	Team	Apps	(Gls)
2006–2008	Bella Vista	63	(5)
2009–2013	Everton	57	(5)
2011–2012	→ Peñarol (loan)	51	(4)
2012–2013	→ Rosario Central (loan)	12	(0)
2014–2015	Wanderers	13	(1)
2015	→ Internacional (loan)	16	(0)
2016–2017	Peñarol	4	(0)
2017–2018	Sud América	7	(0)
2018	Progreso	21	(1)
2019	Melgar	8	(0)
2020–	Boston River	6	(1)
- * Club domestic league appearances and goals as of 13:43, 6 October 2020 (UTC)

Nicolás Andrés Freitas Silva (born 8 June 1987) is a Uruguayan footballer who plays for Boston River.

== Personal life ==
Freitas' brother, Gonzalo, is also a footballer.

== Honours ==
Internacional

- Campeonato Gaúcho: 2015
