= Jefferson Hurtado =

Ecuadorian footballer (born 1987)

Personal information
- Full name: Jefferson Javier Hurtado Orovio
- Date of birth: August 2, 1987 (age 39)
- Place of birth: Limones, Ecuador
- Height: 1.89 m (6 ft 2 1/2 in)
- Position: Defender

Team information
- Current team: El Nacional
- Number: 24

Youth career
- 2005–2008: Barcelona

Senior career*
Years	Team	Apps	(Gls)
2009–2012	Barcelona	80	(3)
2011–2012	→ Argentinos Juniors (loan)	6	(0)
2012	→ Deportivo Quito (loan)	12	(0)
2013–	El Nacional	10	(0)
- * Club domestic league appearances and goals as of 1 May 2013

Jefferson Hurtado (Spanish pronunciation: [ˈʝefeɾson uɾˈtaðo]; born August 2, 1987) is an Ecuadorian footballer currently playing for El Nacional. He plays as a defender and is a regular starter for his club.

== Club career ==
Jefferson came out as a professional at Barcelona SC. The new head coach of Barcelona SC Benito Floro requested Hurtado's presence for the motivated project called La Renovacion.

Jefferson Scored his first goal in his career in the Copa Sudamericana 2010 against Universidad César Vallejo.
