= Juan Quintana =

Juan Quintana may refer to:

- Juan Quintana (field hockey) (born 1946), a Spanish field hockey player
- Juan Quintana (footballer, born 2000), an Uruguayan footballer
- Juan Quintana (footballer, born 2003), a Colombian footballer
- Juan Antonio Quintana (1939 – 2022), a Spanish actor
- Juan de Quintana (c.1482–1534), an imperial theologian
- Juanito Quintana (1891-1974), a Spanish businessman
