= Joel Burgueño =

Uruguayan footballer (born 1988)

Personal information
- Full name: Joel Orozmán Burgueño Marcant
- Date of birth: 14 February 1988 (age 38)
- Place of birth: Montevideo, Uruguay
- Height: 1.69 m (5 ft 7 in)
- Position: Midfielder

Team information
- Current team: Albion
- Number: 21

Senior career*
Years	Team	Apps	(Gls)
2007–2011	Sportivo Cerrito	28	(4)
2012	Cerro Largo	9	(2)
2013	Rocha	12	(3)
2013–2014	Villa Teresa	25	(11)
2014–2015	El Tanque Sisley	28	(16)
2015	Libertad	5	(0)
2016	Rentistas	12	(5)
2016	Antofagasta	2	(0)
2017	Racing de Montevideo	2	(0)
2017	El Tanque Sisley	11	(1)
2018	Progreso	9	(2)
2020–	Albion	8	(1)
- * Club domestic league appearances and goals as of 23:04, 26 September 2020 (UTC)

Joel Orozmán Burgueño Marcant (born 14 February 1988) is a Uruguayan footballer who plays for Albion FC.
