= Michel Rusheshangoga =

Rwandan footballer

Personal information
- Date of birth: 25 August 1994 (age 32)
- Place of birth: Rwanda
- Height: 1.72 m (5 ft 7 1/2 in)
- Position: Defender

Senior career*
Years	Team	Apps	(Gls)
2011–2012	Isonga		
2012–2017	APR		
2017–2018	Singida United		
2018–	APR		

International career^{‡}
2012–	Rwanda	16	(0)
- * Club domestic league appearances and goals as of 13:17, 24 August 2014 (UTC) ‡ National team caps and goals as of 13:17, 24 August 2014 (UTC)

Michel Rusheshangoga (born 25 August 1994) is a Rwandan former footballer who played for As Kigali, as a defender.

== Career ==
Rusheshangoga has played for Kigali-based clubs Isonga and APR.

He made his senior international debut for Rwanda on 1 December 2012 in and against Eritrea (0–2), where he played the entire match, and has appeared in FIFA World Cup qualifying matches.
