= Lucas Rodríguez (footballer, born 1993) =

Argentine footballer

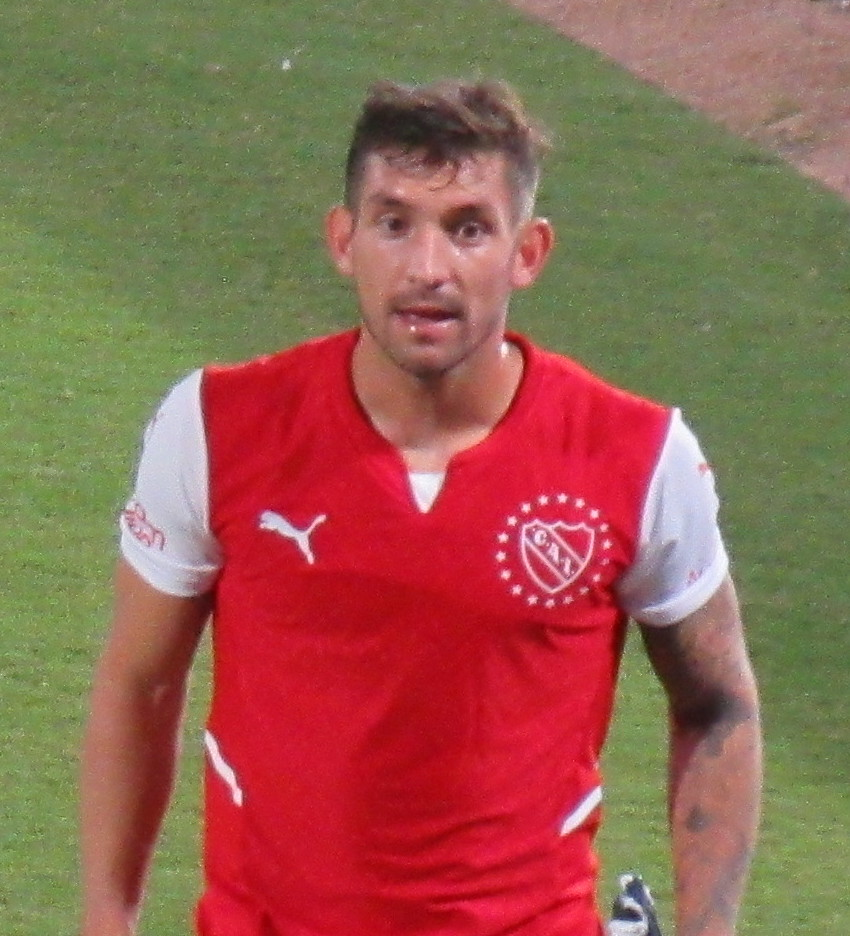
- Rodríguez in 2022

Personal information
- Full name: Lucas Nahuel Rodríguez
- Date of birth: 27 September 1993 (age 33)
- Place of birth: Buenos Aires, Argentina
- Height: 1.69 m (5 ft 7 in)
- Position: Left-back

Team information
- Current team: Aldosivi
- Number: 18

Youth career
- Argentinos Juniors

Senior career*
Years	Team	Apps	(Gls)
2010–2016	Argentinos Juniors	57	(1)
2016–2020	Veracruz	17	(0)
2018–2020	→ Tigre (loan)	35	(2)
2020–2023	Independiente	44	(2)
2023	Rosario Central	7	(0)
2023–2026	Instituto	55	(0)
2026–	Aldosivi	11	(0)

International career
2011–2013	Argentina U20	10	(0)
- * Club domestic league appearances and goals as of 17:39, 11 May 2026 (UTC)

Lucas Nahuel Rodríguez (born 27 September 1993) is an Argentine footballer who plays as a left-back for Aldosivi.
