= Nicolás Prieto =

Uruguayan footballer (born 1992)

Personal information
- Full name: Nicolás Santiago Prieto Larrea
- Date of birth: 5 September 1992 (age 34)
- Place of birth: Montevideo, Uruguay
- Height: 1.75 m (5 ft 9 in)
- Position: Defensive midfielder

Team information
- Current team: Pérez Zeledón
- Number: 15

Senior career*
Years	Team	Apps	(Gls)
2011–2017	Nacional	22	(0)
2016	→ Boston River (loan)	10	(0)
2017	→ Rampla Juniors (loan)	34	(0)
2018–2021	Danubio	52	(2)
2019	→ Correcaminos UAT (loan)	9	(0)
2021–2022	Manta	24	(0)
2022	Rentistas	23	(0)
2023	Rampla Juniors	24	(0)
2024	Sportivo Bella Italia		
2025–	Pérez Zeledón	9	(0)

International career^{‡}
2009	Uruguay U17	5	(0)
2011	Uruguay U20	8	(0)
- * Club domestic league appearances and goals as of 20 April 2025 ‡ National team caps and goals as of 6 August 2011

Nicolás Santiago Prieto Larrea (born 5 September 1992) is a Uruguayan professional footballer who plays as a defensive midfielder for Costa Rican club Pérez Zeledón.

== International career ==
Prieto has been capped by the Uruguay national under-20 football team for the 2011 South American Youth Championship and for the 2011 FIFA U-20 World Cup.
