= Jim Varela =

Uruguayan footballer (born 1994)

Personal information
- Full name: Jim Morrison Varela Devotto
- Date of birth: 16 October 1994 (age 32)
- Place of birth: Montevideo, Uruguay
- Height: 1.75 m (5 ft 9 in)
- Position: Defensive midfielder

Team information
- Current team: Parque del Plata

Youth career
- 2006–2012: Peñarol

Senior career*
Years	Team	Apps	(Gls)
2012–2013	Peñarol	3	(0)
2013–2016	Benfica B	0	(0)
2013–2014	→ Farense (loan)	10	(1)
2015	→ Rampla Juniors (loan)	8	(0)
2016	São Paulo-RS	0	(0)
2016–2019	Atenas	61	(1)
2017	→ Juventud (loan)	26	(3)
2020	Chacarita Juniors	6	(0)
2020	Racing de Montevideo	15	(0)
2021–2023	Rentistas	48	(2)
2023	Albion	27	(2)
2024	Real España	33	(1)
2025	Salus		
2025	Cerrito	12	(1)
2026	Marquense	1	(0)
2026–	Parque del Plata		

International career
2011	Uruguay U17	5	(0)
2013	Uruguay U20	9	(0)
- * Club domestic league appearances and goals as of 21 June 2026

Jim Morrison Varela Devotto (born 16 October 1994) is a Uruguayan footballer who plays as a defensive midfielder for Uruguayan Primera División Amateur club Parque del Plata.

== Club career ==
Born in Montevideo, Varela joined Peñarol youth ranks at age 12. The 1.75 m (5 ft 9 in) or 1.80 m (5 ft 11 in) midfielder, depending on sources, made his professional debut for Penãrol in the 2010–11 Primera División and also making part of the squad that won the 2012–13 Uruguayan Primera División.

Varela joined S.L. Benfica in July 2013, being initially loaned to Farense. In early September 2014, he went on tryouts at Real Murcia. On 21 January 2015, Varela joined Rampla Juniors on loan. On 31 August 2015, Varela returned to Benfica.

On 10 May 2016, Varela joined Brazilian club Sport Club São Paulo from Rio Grande, Rio Grande do Sul.

== International career ==
Varela was part of Uruguay U-17 team that took competed in the 2011 FIFA U-17 World Cup in Mexico, playing five matches, with the Uruguayan team finishing in second place. He also played once for the Uruguay U20 in the 2013 FIFA U-20 World Cup in Turkey.
