= Nicolás Olmedo =

Argentine footballer

Personal information
- Full name: Nicolás Andrés Olmedo
- Date of birth: 10 March 1983 (age 43)
- Place of birth: Godoy Cruz, Mendoza, Argentina
- Height: 1.83 m (6 ft 0 in)
- Position: Defensive midfielder

Youth career
- Godoy Cruz

Senior career*
Years	Team	Apps	(Gls)
2002–2012	Godoy Cruz	217	(4)
2004–2005	→ San Martín (T) (loan)	25	(2)
2013	Barcelona SC	2	(0)
2013–2014	Argentinos Juniors	8	(0)
2014–2015	Crucero del Norte	32	(1)
2016–2018	Gimnasia Jujuy	56	(2)
2018–2019	Deportivo Maipú	10	(0)

International career
2010	Argentina	1	(0)
- * Club domestic league appearances and goals as of 23:07, 9 October 2019 (UTC)

Nicolás Andrés Olmedo (born 10 March 1983) is an Argentine football midfielder.

== Club career ==
=== Godoy Cruz ===
Olmedo started his career in 2002 with Godoy Cruz, while the team played in the Primer (regionalized fourth division) on its 2004–05 season.

Upon his return to Godoy Cruz, he won with the team the 2005–06 season of the Primera B Nacional, securing promotion to the Argentine Primera. Olmedo saw little action during Godoy Cruz' subsequent season in the first division (the 2006–07), playing only 12 games and scoring 1 goal. Godoy Cruz was relegated by the end of the season, but the midfielder stayed with the team and helped them return to the first division after only one season.

In his second period in the first division, Olmedo became an integral part of Godoy Cruz' first team. He started in 18 (of a total 19) games for his team's third-place finish in the 2010 Clausura, the best historical campaign by a Mendoza Province based team in the Argentine league.

=== Barcelona SC ===
Gustavo Costas signed Nicolas Olmedo to play for Barcelona SC.

== International career ==
In 2010, Olmedo was called to the Argentina national team by coach Diego Maradona to play a friendly match against Haiti, in a squad formed exclusively with players from the Argentine league.

== Honours ==
San Martín de Tucumán

- Torneo Argentino B (1): 2004–05

Godoy Cruz

- Primera B Nacional (1): 2005–06
