= Eduardo Filippini =

Argentine footballer

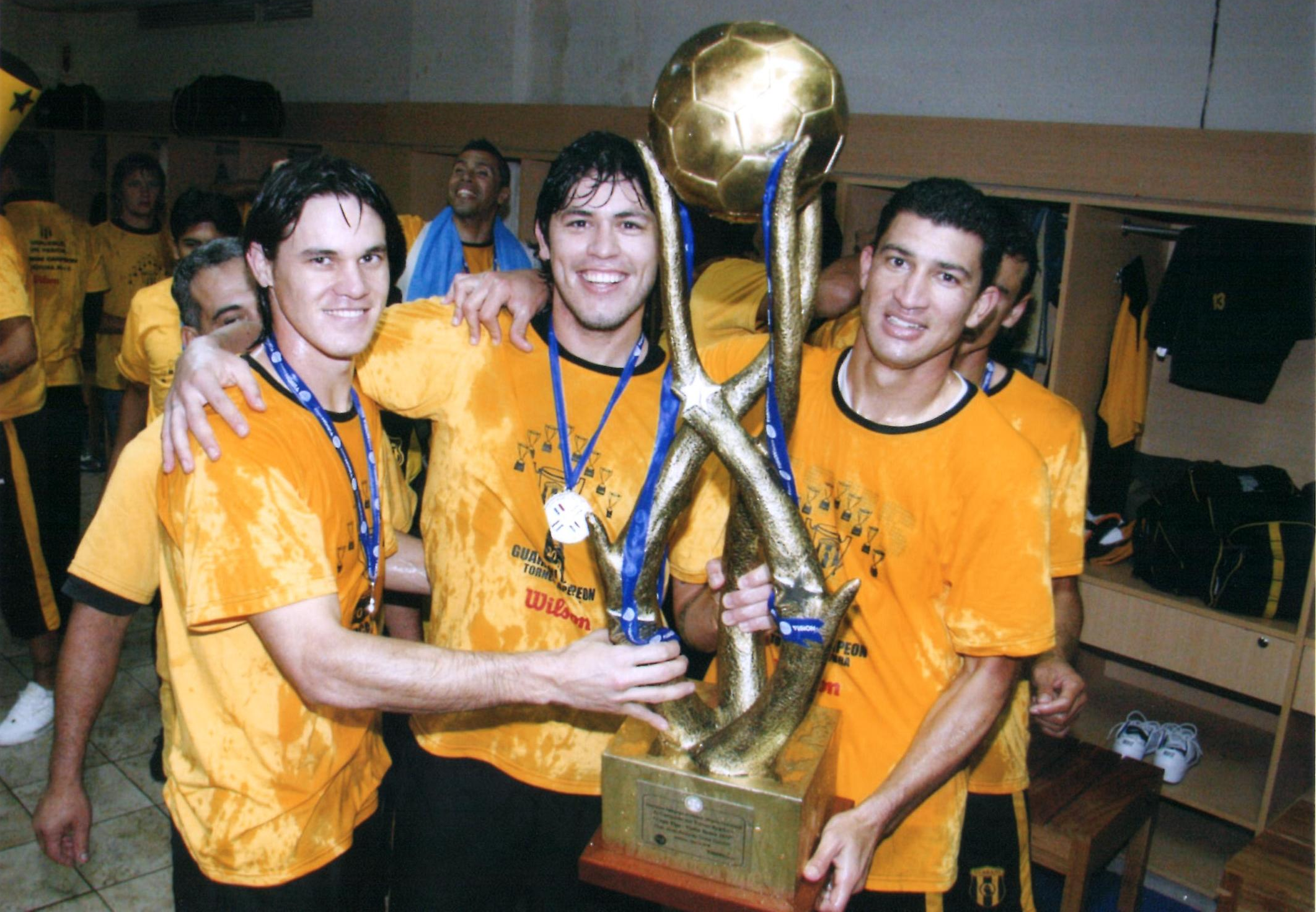
- Festejo en el vestuario aborigen entre Paulo Centurion, Joel Benítez y Eduardo Filippini tras la obtencion del titulo de Campeon conseguido por el Club Guarani en el Torneo Apertura 2010 de la Asociación Paraguaya de Fútbol

Personal information
- Date of birth: June 5, 1983 (age 43)
- Place of birth: Formosa, Argentina
- Height: 1.83 m (6 ft 0 in)
- Position: Defender

Senior career*
Years	Team	Apps	(Gls)
2004–2006	Guaraní	26	(1)
2007	Martín Ledesma		
2008	2 de Mayo	16	(1)
2008–2016	Guaraní	233	(14)
2017	Argentinos del Norte	9	(2)
2019	Juventud Naick Neck	3	(0)
Medal record
Guaraní
Winner	Paraguayan Primera División	2010 Apertura
Winner	Paraguayan Primera División	2016 Clausura
- * Club domestic league appearances and goals

Eduardo Filippini (born June 5, 1983) is an Argentine footballer who plays as a defender for Guaraní of the Primera Division in Paraguay.

== Career ==
Born in Formosa, Argentina, located near the border with Paraguay, Filippini's ancestors were Paraguayan. After a spell with Club 2 de Mayo, Filippini returned to Guaraní in 2008.

In 2010, after five years playing football for clubs in Paraguay, Filippini became a naturalized Paraguayan citizen in hopes of representing the Paraguay national football team.

== Personal ==
His older brother, Valentín Filippini, is also a professional footballer.

== Teams ==
- (Paraguay) Guaraní 2004–2006
- (Paraguay) Martín Ledesma 2007
- (Paraguay) 2 de Mayo 2008
- (Paraguay) Guaraní 2008–present
