= Ignacio Ratti =

Uruguayan footballer (born 1994)

Personal information
- Full name: Héber Ignacio Ratti Guardia
- Date of birth: April 5, 1994 (age 32)
- Place of birth: Las Piedras, Uruguay
- Height: 1.78 m (5 ft 10 in)
- Position: Midfielder

Team information
- Current team: Huracán

Youth career
- River Plate Montevideo

Senior career*
Years	Team	Apps	(Gls)
2014–2015	River Plate	7	(0)
2016	Progreso	21	(1)
2017	Tanque Sisley	3	(0)
2019–	Huracán		

International career
2011	Uruguay U-17		
- * Club domestic league appearances and goals

Ignacio Ratti (born April 5, 1994) is a Uruguayan footballer who plays for Huracán.

== Career ==
Ratti started his senior career playing for River Plate (Uruguay) in 2014–2015 season. In 2011, he was enrolled in Uruguay national under-17 football team and played in the 2011 FIFA U-17 World Cup.

In 2019, Ratti joined Huracán FC.
