= Javier Salazar =

Peruvian footballer (born 1982)

Personal information
- Full name: Javier Bohuzlav Salazar Tejada
- Date of birth: 11 March 1982 (age 44)
- Place of birth: Lima, Peru
- Height: 1.83 m (6 ft 0 in)
- Position: Centre-back

Senior career*
Years	Team	Apps	(Gls)
2002	Sport Boys		
2003	Deportivo Wanka		
2004–2005	Unión Huaral		
2006	Sporting Cristal		
2007	Cienciano		
2008	José Gálvez	7	(0)
2009	Univ. César Vallejo	12	(1)
2010	Sport Huancayo	30	(2)
2011	José Gálvez		
2012	Universidad Técnica de Cajamarca		
2014–2015	Sport Boys		
2016	Cienciano		
2019	Sport Loreto		
2019–2020	Cienciano		
- * Club domestic league appearances and goals

Javier Bohuzlav Salazar Tejada (born 11 March 1982) is a Peruvian former professional footballer who played as a centre-back.

== Career ==
Salazar started his senior career with Sport Boys in the 2002 Torneo Descentralizado.

He then joined Deportivo Wanka the following season. There he scored his first goal in the Descentralizado in the 2–2 draw away to Coronel Bolognesi for Round 22 of the 2003 season.

In 2004 he joined Unión Huaral. He scored the winning goal in the 1–0 home win over his former club Sport Boys in Round 10 of the 2005 season.

Salazar played for Sporting Cristal in the 2006 Descentralizado season.

== Honours ==
José Gálvez

- Copa del Inca: 2011
- Peruvian Segunda División: 2011

UTC

- Copa Perú: 2012

Cienciano

- Liga 2: 2019
