= Barros Blancos =

Barros Blancos Juan Antonio Artigas
- City
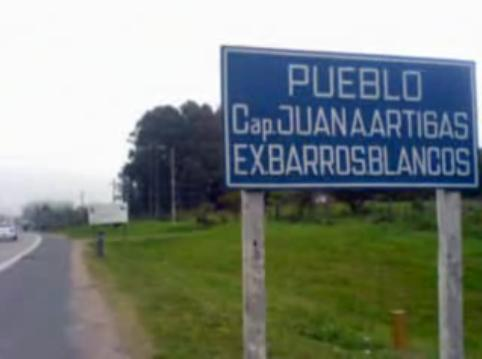

- Location in Uruguay
- Coordinates: 34°45′15″S 56°0′15″W
- Country: Uruguay
- Department: Canelones
- Founded: 1940

Area
  - Total: 22.2 km^{2} (8.6 sq mi)
- Elevation: 20 m (66 ft)

Population (2023 Census)
  - Total: 35,660
  - Density: 1,610/km^{2} (4,160/sq mi)
- Time zone: UTC -3
- Postal code: 91001
- Dial plan: +598 2 (+7 digits)

Barros Blancos is a city in the Canelones Department of southern Uruguay. In 1976, it had been renamed to Juan Antonio Artigas, after commanding officer Juan Antonio Artigas, grandfather of the national hero José Gervasio Artigas, but the old name was reinstated in 2007.

Barros Blancos is also the name of the municipality to which the city belongs and which includes the two fragments of Camino Maldonado and some surrounding rural areas.

== Geography ==
The city is located on Route 8, northeast by road from Montevideo, on the road to Pando, also north of Colonia Nicolich and southwest of Toledo and Joaquín Suárez. It forms a southwestern extension of the urban area of Pando. They all belong to the wider metropolitan area of Montevideo.

== History ==
The land developed, immersed in a large rural area without electricity services, water or telephone. Local economic activity was linked to meat canning, and numerous sawmills, warehouses, brick kilns and barns grew up in the area.

The first school in the area was established in 1925, and by the mid-1940s public services became available. Factories, shops, and sports centres and clubs were established. In the mid-twentieth century a population explosion occurred due to the presence of industry which resulted in jobs, with many families buying modest homes in the area.

On 15 October 1963, Barros Blancos was elevated to the category of "Villa" (town). On 25 June 1976, Barros Blancos was renamed "Juan Antonio Artigas" in honor of the grandfather of the hero José Gervasio Artigas, by the Act of Ley Nº 14.538. On 13 December 2006, it was declared a city with the same name by the Act of Ley Nº 16.670. However, on 11 June 2007 its name was changed back to "Barros Blancos" by the Act of Ley Nº 18.136.

== Places of worship ==
- Parish Church of Our Lady of Perpetual Help (Roman Catholic)

== Population ==
According to the 2023 census, Barros Blancos had a population of 35,660*. In 2010 the Intendencia de Canelones had recorded a population of 28,610 for the municipality during the elections.

Year	Population
1963	5,324
1975	8,311
1985	10,585
1996	13,464
2004	13,553
2011	31,650
2023	35,660

Source: Instituto Nacional de Estadística de Uruguay

* Since the 2011 census published no separate population numbers for the 2 fragments of Camino Maldonado, whose population was 15,057 in the census of 2004, it can be safely presumed that the new number published for Barros Blancos has incorporated the population of the two fragments, as can be seen in the maps of INE census.
