= Jonathan Souza =

Uruguayan footballer (born 1989)

Jonathan Daniel Souza Motta (born March 7, 1989, in Montevideo) is a Uruguayan footballer currently playing as a defender for Club Atlético Progreso of the Uruguayan Primera División.

== Teams ==
- (Uruguay) Liverpool 2010–2011
- (Argentina) Boca Unidos 2011
- (Uruguay) Rampla Juniors 2012
- (Uruguay) Progreso 2013
