= Héctor Ramírez (footballer) =

Colombian footballer (born 1982)

Personal information
- Full name: Héctor Fabián Ramírez Pinillo
- Date of birth: 26 June 1982 (age 44)
- Place of birth: Cali, Colombia
- Height: 1.81 m (5 ft 11 in)
- Position: Forward

Senior career*
Years	Team	Apps	(Gls)
2004	Cortuluá		
2004	Monagas SC		
2005	Delfín		
2006	Deportivo Quevedo		
2006–2007	Deportivo Armenio		
2007–2008	Cortuluá		
2009	Inti Gas Deportes	31	(8)
2010	Sport Huancayo	31	(4)
2011–2012	Cortuluá	45	(15)
2012–2013	Halcones	35	(10)
2013	Alfonso Ugarte de Puno	10	(1)
2014	Llaneros	4	(0)
- * Club domestic league appearances and goals

Héctor Fabián Ramírez (born 26 June 1982) is a Colombian former professional footballer who played as a forward.
