= Andrew Buteera =

Rwandan footballer

Personal information
- Date of birth: 3 October 1994 (age 32)
- Place of birth: Kampala, Uganda
- Height: 1.77 m (5 ft 10 in)
- Position: Midfielder

Team information
- Current team: APR

Senior career*
Years	Team	Apps	(Gls)
2011–2012	Proline		
2012–	APR		

International career^{‡}
2011–	Rwanda	20	(0)
- * Club domestic league appearances and goals as of 16:10, 17 February 2021 (UTC) ‡ National team caps and goals as of 16:10, 17 February 2021 (UTC)

Andrew Buteera (born 3 October 1994) is a Rwandan footballer who plays as a midfielder for APR and the Rwanda national football team.

== Club career ==
Born in Kampala, Buteera started his career at Proline in Uganda in 2011 before joining APR on a two-year deal in 2012.

== International career ==
Buteera made his international debut for Rwanda on 3 September 2011 in a 5–0 2012 Africa Cup of Nations qualification defeat to Ivory Coast.
