= Elbio Álvarez =

Uruguayan footballer (born 1994)

Personal information
- Full name: Elbio Maximiliano Álvarez Wallace
- Date of birth: 13 June 1994 (age 32)
- Place of birth: Montevideo, Uruguay
- Height: 1.76 m (5 ft 9 1/2 in)
- Position: Midfielder

Youth career
- 2010–2013: Peñarol

Senior career*
Years	Team	Apps	(Gls)
2013–2015	Peñarol		
2015–2016	Benfica B	13	(0)

International career
2011	Uruguay U17	14	(3)
- * Club domestic league appearances and goals as of 16 September 2015

Elbio Maximiliano Álvarez Wallace (born 13 June 1994) is a Uruguayan professional footballer who plays as midfielder.

== Club career ==
Álvarez was born in Montevideo, Uruguay. On 29 January 2015, the former Peñarol player, joined Portuguese champions S.L. Benfica, along with countryman Jonathan Rodríguez, being assigned to the reserve team. On 15 March 2015, he debuted for Benfica B as a substitute in an away win at Farense (0–3) in Segunda Liga.

== Honours ==
Uruguay

- FIFA U-17 World Cup: Runner-up 2011
