= Carlos Valdez (footballer, born 1983) =

Uruguayan footballer

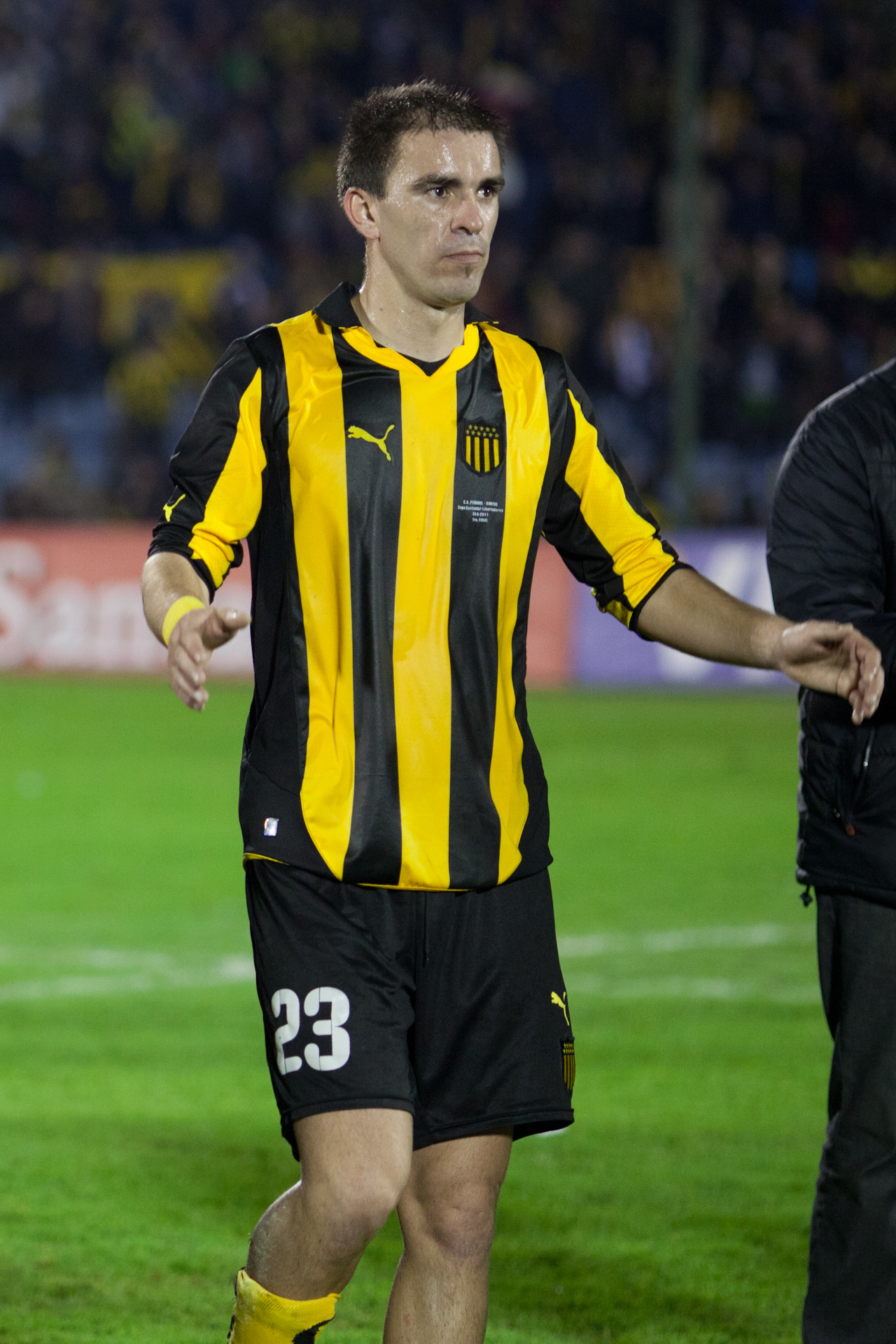

Personal information
- Full name: Carlos Adrián Valdez Suárez
- Date of birth: May 2, 1983 (age 43)
- Place of birth: Montevideo, Uruguay
- Height: 1.83 m (6 ft 0 in)
- Position: Centre back

Team information
- Current team: Boston River
- Number: 23

Senior career*
Years	Team	Apps	(Gls)
2001–2007	Nacional	55	(2)
2005–2007	→ Treviso (loan)	53	(2)
2007–2010	Reggina	94	(1)
2010	→ Siena (loan)	3	(0)
2011–2016	Peñarol	170	(3)
2017–	Boston River	153	(5)

International career
2006–2010	Uruguay	17	(0)
- * Club domestic league appearances and goals as of 8 September 2024

Carlos Adrián Valdez Suárez (born 2 May 1983) is a Uruguayan football player who plays for Boston River.

== Football career ==
Valdez began his career with Club Nacional de Football before moving to clubs in Italy. He made his Serie A debut against Empoli F.C. on 23 October 2005. Recently he has signed a 6-month contract with Peñarol.

Valdez has made 17 appearances for the Uruguay national football team, and played in the Copa América 2007.

On July 27, 2010 he was reserved to play a friendly match against Angola in Lisbon .

=== Clubs ===
Club	Country	Years	Players	Goals
Nacional	Uruguay	2002 - 2005	?	?
Treviso	Italy	2005 - 2007	53	2
Reggina	Italy	2007 - 2010	97	1
Siena	Italy	2010	4	0
Peñarol	Uruguay	2011 - 2016	170	3
Boston River	Uruguay	2017–Present	2	0
