= Diego Benítez (footballer, born 1988) =

Uruguayan footballer

Personal information
- Full name: Diego Fernando Benítez Quintana
- Date of birth: January 23, 1988 (age 38)
- Place of birth: Colonia, Uruguay
- Position: Forward

Senior career*
Years	Team	Apps	(Gls)
2009–2010	Defensor Sporting	4	(0)
2009	→ Dinamo București II (loan)	7	(2)
2010–2011	Plaza Colonia	30	(3)
2011	Técnico Universitario	35	(5)
2012–2015	Universidad Católica	114	(28)
2015	Deportivo Municipal	17	(3)
2016	S.D. Aucas	15	(1)
2016	Cafetaleros de Tapachula	7	(0)
2017	C.S.D. Macará	32	(3)
2018	Rampla Juniors	12	(0)
2018	Miramar Misiones	8	(1)
2018–2019	Alianza	12	(2)
2020	Manta		
- * Club domestic league appearances and goals

Diego Fernando Benítez Quintana (born January 23, 1988, in Colonia, Uruguay), is a professional Uruguayan footballer who plays as a forward. (Note: Diego Benítez at WorldFootball.net)

== Club career ==
In December 2018, Benítez signed with Alianza FC of the Salvadoran Primera División.
