= Estadio Municipal de La Pintana =

Stadium in Santiago, Chile

La Pintana Municipal Stadium
- Estadio Municipal de La Pintana
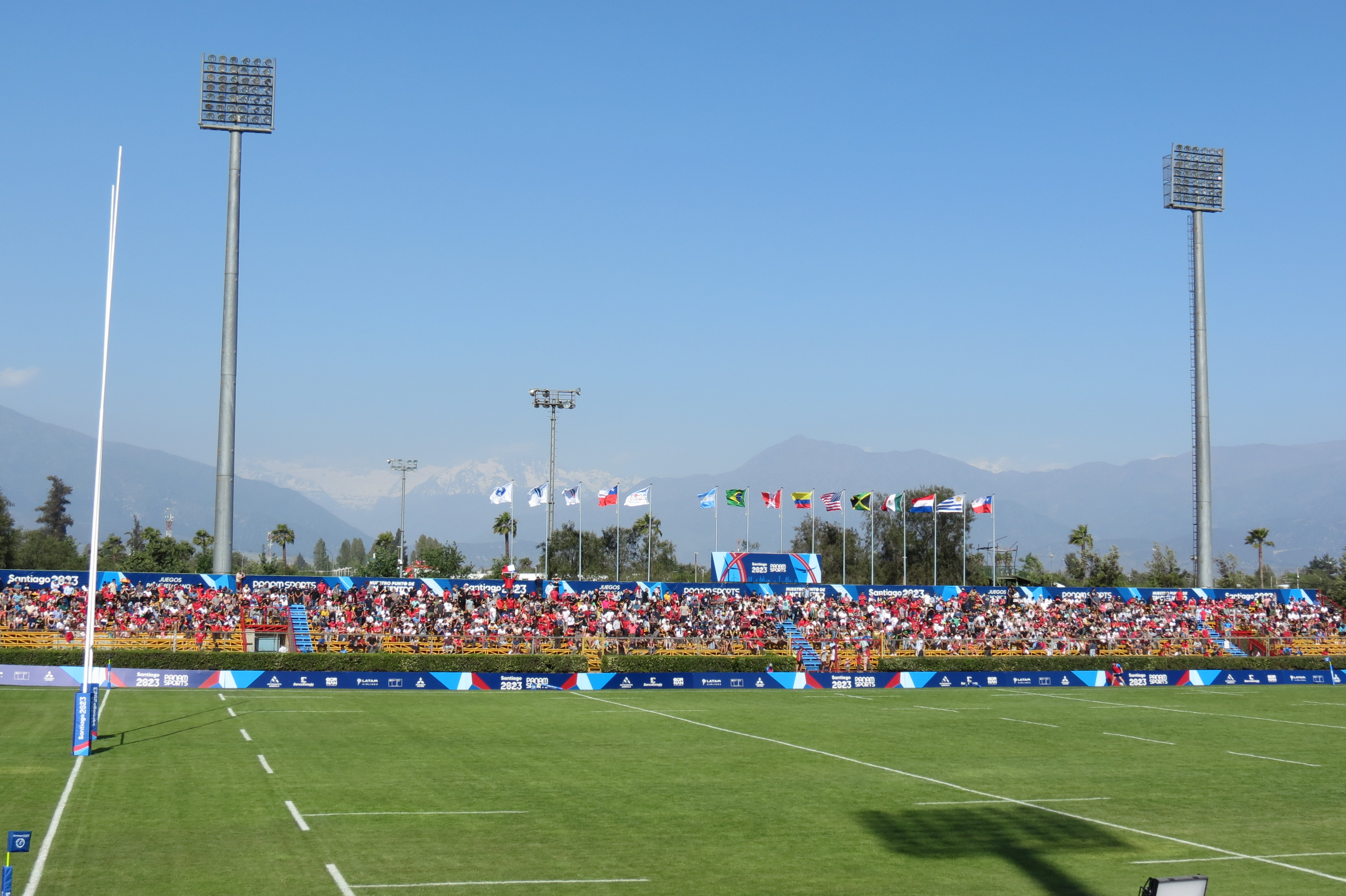
- The stadium during the 2023 Rugby Sevens
- Interactive map of La Pintana Municipal Stadium
- Location: La Pintana, Santiago, Chile
- Coordinates: 33°35′12″S 70°38′9″W
- Owner: Municipality of La Pintana
- Capacity: 5,000
- Surface: Grass
- Field size: 105 x 68 m

Tenants
- Santiago Morning (football); Selknam (rugby) (2023–present)

Estadio Municipal de La Pintana is a football stadium in La Pintana, Santiago, Chile. It is the home stadium of Santiago Morning and former home stadium for Deportes Pintana. The stadium holds 5,000 people.

In 2016 and 2018 the stadium hosted some games of the Americas Rugby Championship.

In May 2017 it hosted two South American Rugby Championship (which also served as qualifiers for the Rugby World Cup), games between hosts nation Chile against Brazil and Paraguay. Chile won both games.

Since 2023, Estadio Municipal became home ground of rugby union franchise Selknam. In previous seasons, the team had played at Estadio San Carlos de Apoquindo and Estadio Elías Figueroa located in Las Condes and Valparaíso respectively.
