= Uruguay national under-20 football team =

Uruguay Under-20
- Nickname(s): Cains; La Celeste Olímpica (The Olympic Sky Blue); La Celeste (The Sky Blue); La Más Linda (The Most Beautiful); Los Charruas
- Association: Uruguayan Football Association
- Confederation: CONMEBOL (South America)
- Head coach: Diego Forlán
- Captain: Benjamín García
- Home stadium: Estadio Centenario
- FIFA code: URU
First colours	Second colours

U-20 World Cup
- Appearances: 16 (first in 1979)
- Best result: Champions (2023)

South American Youth Football Championship
- Appearances: 30 (first in 1954)
- Best result: Champions (1954, 1958, 1964, 1975, 1977, 1979, 1981, 2017)
Medal record
FIFA U-20 World Cup
Gold medal – first place	2023 Argentina	Team
Silver medal – second place	1997 Malaysia	Team
Silver medal – second place	2013 Turkey	Team

Uruguay national under-20 football team represents Uruguay in international football competitions such as FIFA U-20 World Cup and the South American Youth Football Championship.

== Results and fixtures ==
The following is a list of match results in the last 12 months, as well as any future matches that have been scheduled.

Win Draw Loss

=== 2026 ===
25 August Friendly	Uruguay	0–2	Paraguay	Barros Blancos
		Report		Stadium: Complejo Celeste

27 August Friendly	Uruguay	2–3	Paraguay	Barros Blancos
	Estevan Pereyra; Agustín Fernández	Report		Stadium: Complejo Celeste

17 September 2026 South American Games Group Stage	Uruguay	0–1	Venezuela	Rosario
15:00 UTC−3		Report		Stadium: Estadio Marcelo Bielsa

19 September 2026 South American Games Group Stage	Argentina	1–0	Uruguay	Rosario
15:00 UTC−3		Report		Stadium: Estadio Marcelo Bielsa

21 September 2026 South American Games Group Stage	Paraguay	1–1	Uruguay	Rosario
10:00 UTC−3		Report	Lautaro Navarro	Stadium: Estadio Marcelo Bielsa

== Coaching staff ==
As of 6 August 2026

Position	Name
Head coach	(Uruguay) Diego Forlán
Assistant coaches	(Uruguay) Santiago Espasandín (Uruguay) Diego Pérez
Goalkeeping coach	(Uruguay) Ignacio Bordad

== Players ==
=== Current squad ===
The following 18 players were called up for the 2026 South American Games.

Caps and goals correct as of 21 September 2026, after the match against Paraguay.

No.	Pos.	Player	Date of birth (age)	Caps	Goals	Club
1	GK	Axell Amaral	15 November 2007 (age 19)	3	0	(United Arab Emirates Football Association) Al Ain
12	GK	Felipe Ortiz	6 November 2007 (age 19)	3	0	(Uruguayan Football Association) Deportivo Maldonado
2	DF	Benjamín García (captain)	4 February 2007 (age 19)	5	0	(Uruguayan Football Association) Montevideo City Torque
3	DF	Rodrigo Álvez	9 October 2007 (age 19)	9	0	(Uruguayan Football Association) Peñarol
4	DF	Valentino Würth	21 May 2007 (age 19)	5	0	(Uruguayan Football Association) Montevideo City Torque
6	DF	Thomas Sorensen	30 June 2007 (age 19)	5	0	(Uruguayan Football Association) Albion
13	DF	Ahmed Njankouo	18 January 2007 (age 19)	3	0	(Uruguayan Football Association) River Plate Montevideo
15	DF	Román Clematte	6 September 2007 (age 19)	3	0	(Uruguayan Football Association) Nacional
5	MF	Julio Daguer	22 February 2008 (age 18)	3	0	(Uruguayan Football Association) Peñarol
8	MF	Lautaro Ultra	21 May 2007 (age 19)	3	0	(Croatian Football Federation) Dinamo Zagreb II
10	MF	Kevin Suárez	1 June 2007 (age 19)	4	0	(Uruguayan Football Association) Defensor Sporting
14	MF	Ezequiel Amaro	22 March 2007 (age 19)	5	0	(Uruguayan Football Association) Paysandú
16	MF	Mateo Soria	14 March 2007 (age 19)	4	0	(Uruguayan Football Association) Nacional
17	MF	Agustín López	4 February 2008 (age 18)	2	0	(Uruguayan Football Association) Montevideo Wanderers
7	FW	Facundo Martínez	4 February 2008 (age 18)	5	0	(Uruguayan Football Association) Montevideo City Torque
9	FW	Lautaro Navarro	10 February 2008 (age 18)	3	1	(Uruguayan Football Association) Defensor Sporting
11	FW	Emiliano Domínguez	8 February 2008 (age 18)	5	0	(Uruguayan Football Association) Liverpool Montevideo
18	FW	Thiago Fernández	23 January 2007 (age 19)	4	0	(Uruguayan Football Association) Racing Montevideo

=== Recent call-ups ===
The following players have also been called up to the squad in the past 12 months.

Pos.	Player	Date of birth (age)	Caps	Goals	Club	Latest call-up
GK	Paulo Da Costa	13 June 2008 (age 18)	1	0	(Uruguay) Peñarol	v. Paraguay, 27 August 2026
GK	Lucas Quimbo	14 November 2007 (age 19)	0	0	(Uruguay) Juventud	v. Paraguay, 27 August 2026
DF	Brian Barboza	14 May 2008 (age 18)	0	0	(Uruguay) Peñarol	2026 South American Games ^{WD}
DF	Yuri Oyarzo	13 December 2007 (age 18)	0	0	(Uruguay) Racing Montevideo	2026 South American Games ^{WD}
DF	Luciano Rodríguez	15 March 2007 (age 19)	0	0	(Uruguay) Nacional	2026 South American Games ^{WD}
DF	Nahuel Pérez	10 December 2008 (age 17)	2	0	(Uruguay) Nacional	v. Paraguay, 27 August 2026
DF	Facundo Abreu	1 December 2008 (age 17)	1	0	(Uruguay) Albion	v. Paraguay, 27 August 2026
DF	Facundo Balatti	9 June 2008 (age 18)	2	0	(Uruguay) Danubio	v. Paraguay, 27 August 2026
DF	Cristofer Marques	19 February 2007 (age 19)	1	0	(Uruguay) Montevideo Wanderers	v. Paraguay, 27 August 2026
MF	Agustín Dos Santos	9 February 2008 (age 18)	0	0	(Uruguay) Nacional	2026 South American Games ^{WD}
MF	Luciano González	7 March 2008 (age 18)	0	0	(Uruguay) Nacional	2026 South American Games ^{WD}
MF	Tomás Shaw	31 August 2007 (age 19)	0	0	(Uruguay) Montevideo City Torque	v. Paraguay, 27 August 2026
MF	Mauro Martínez	19 January 2007 (age 19)	5	0	(Uruguay) Nacional	v. Paraguay, 27 August 2026
MF	Tiago Martinelli	25 July 2007 (age 19)	2	0	(Uruguay) Peñarol	v. Paraguay, 27 August 2026
FW	Estevan Pereyra	28 October 2008 (age 18)	2	1	(Uruguay) Peñarol	2026 South American Games ^{INJ}
FW	Facundo Aristegui	3 November 2007 (age 19)	1	0	(Uruguay) Boston River	2026 South American Games ^{WD}
FW	Alan Torterolo	3 January 2008 (age 18)	0	0	(Uruguay) Defensor Sporting	2026 South American Games ^{WD}
FW	Nahuel López	24 January 2007 (age 19)	5	0	(Uruguay) Progreso	v. Paraguay, 27 August 2026
FW	Agustín Fernández	30 May 2007 (age 19)	2	1	(Uruguay) Boston River	v. Paraguay, 27 August 2026
Notes: ^{INJ} = Withdrew due to injury; ^{PRE} = Preliminary squad; ^{WD} = Player withdrew from the squad due to non-injury issue.

== Competitive record ==
=== FIFA U-20 World Cup ===
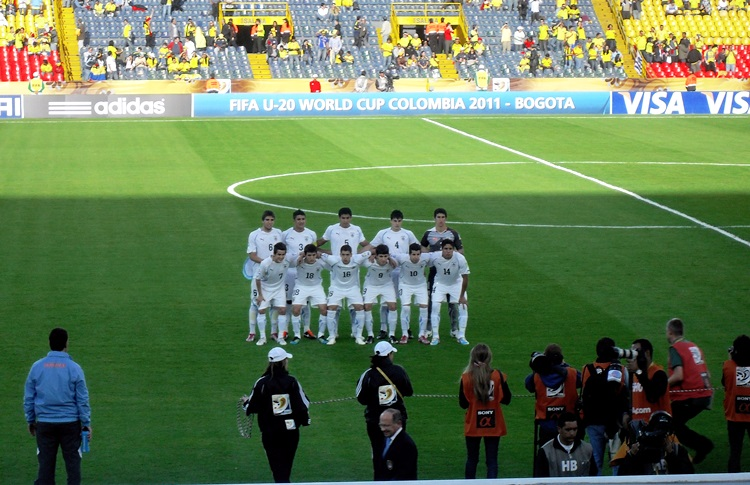
2011 FIFA U-20 World Cup

FIFA U-20 World Cup Record
Year	Round	Position	GP	W	D*	L	GS	GA
(Tunisia) 1977	Fourth Place	4th	5	3	1	1	6	5
(Japan) 1979	Third Place	3rd	6	4	1	1	10	3
(Australia) 1981	Quarter-Finals	5th	4	3	0	1	6	2
(Mexico) 1983	Quarter-Finals	5th	4	2	1	1	7	5
(Soviet Union) 1985	Did not qualify							
(Chile) 1987	Did not qualify							
(Saudi Arabia) 1989	Did not qualify							
(Portugal) 1991	Group Stage	15th	3	0	1	2	0	7
(Australia) 1993	Quarter-Finals	6th	4	2	1	1	6	5
(Qatar) 1995	Banned							
(Malaysia) 1997	Runners-up	2nd	7	4	2	1	14	6
(Nigeria) 1999	Fourth Place	4th	7	2	2	3	7	8
(Argentina) 2001	Did not qualify							
(United Arab Emirates) 2003	Did not qualify							
(Netherlands) 2005	Did not qualify							
(Canada) 2007	Round of 16	12th	4	1	1	2	4	6
(Egypt) 2009	Round of 16	11th	4	2	1	1	7	5
(Colombia) 2011	Group Stage	18th	3	0	2	1	1	2
(Turkey) 2013	Runners-up	2nd	7	4	2	1	10	3
(New Zealand) 2015	Round of 16	12th	4	1	2	1	3	3
(South Korea) 2017	Fourth Place	4th	7	3	4	0	7	3
(Poland) 2019	Round of 16	13th	4	3	0	1	8	4
(Argentina) 2023	Champions	1st	7	6	0	1	12	3
(Chile) 2025	Did not qualify							
(Azerbaijan) (Uzbekistan) 2027	To be determined							
(Armenia) (Georgia (country)) 2029	To be determined							
Total	16/26	1 titles	80	40	21	19	108	70

=== South American Youth Football Championship ===
South American Youth Football Championship record
Year	Round	Position	GP	W	D*	L	GS	GA	+/–	%
(Venezuela) 1954	Champions	1st	6	4	2	0	14	4	+10	66.67
(Chile) 1958	Champions	1st	5	2	3	0	13	9	+4	40.00
(Colombia) 1964	Champions	1st	6	4	1	1	8	5	+3	66.67
(Paraguay) 1967	Group Stage	7th	4	1	1	2	5	7	−2	25.00
(Paraguay) 1971	Runners-up	2nd	5	3	1	1	9	6	+3	60.00
(Chile) 1974	Runners-up	2nd	6	3	1	2	11	6	+5	50.00
(Peru) 1975	Champions	1st	6	3	3	0	9	3	+6	50.00
(Venezuela) 1977	Champions	1st	7	4	3	0	11	2	+9	57.14
(Uruguay) 1979	Champions	1st	6	5	1	0	12	1	+11	83.33
(Ecuador) 1981	Champions	1st	7	5	1	1	17	8	+9	71.43
(Bolivia) 1983	Runners-up	2nd	7	4	2	1	14	12	+2	57.14
(Paraguay) 1985	Fourth Place	4th	7	3	1	3	10	11	−1	42.86
(Colombia) 1987	Fourth Place	4th	7	4	1	2	13	9	+4	57.14
(Argentina) 1988	First Group Stage	10th	4	0	2	2	2	4	−2	0.00
(Venezuela) 1991	Third Place	3rd	7	3	4	0	13	5	+8	42.86
(Colombia) 1992	Runners-up	2nd	6	3	3	0	7	2	+5	50.00
(Bolivia) 1995	Banned									
(Chile) 1997	Fourth Place	4th	9	4	4	1	14	8	+6	44.44
(Argentina) 1999	Runners-up	2nd	9	4	3	2	13	7	+6	44.44
(Ecuador) 2001	First Group Stage	7th	4	1	1	2	4	6	−2	25.00
(Uruguay) 2003	Final Group	5th	9	4	1	4	16	12	+4	44.44
(Colombia) 2005	Final Group	5th	9	2	5	2	13	10	+3	22.22
(Paraguay) 2007	Third Place	3rd	9	4	2	3	13	11	+2	44.44
(Venezuela) 2009	Third Place	3rd	9	6	1	2	21	16	+5	66.67
(Peru) 2011	Runners-up	2nd	9	4	2	3	10	11	−1	44.44
(Argentina) 2013	Third Place	3rd	9	4	3	2	15	12	+3	44.44
(Uruguay) 2015	Third Place	3rd	9	5	2	2	15	5	+10	55.56
(Ecuador) 2017	Champions	1st	9	6	2	1	18	8	+10	66.67
(Chile) 2019	Third Place	3rd	9	4	2	3	10	8	+2	44.44
(Colombia) 2023	Runners-up	2nd	9	7	1	1	19	6	+13	77.78
(Venezuela) 2025	Final Group	5th	9	3	1	5	15	12	+3	33.33
Total	30/31	8 Titles	217	109	60	48	364	226	+138	50.23

=== Minor tournaments ===
Year	Round	Position	GP	W	D*	L	GS	GA	+/–	%
(Paraguay) 2010 Copa Integración Latinoamericana	Fourth Place	4th	3	1	0	2	2	3	−1	33.33
(Colombia) 2010 Copa Alcaldía de Medellín	Runners-up	2nd	3	1	2	0	5	4	+1	33.33
(Bolivia) 2010 Copa Aerosur	Sixth Place	6th	3	0	1	2	2	5	−3	0.00
(Uruguay) 2010 100 Años de la Camiseta Celeste trophy	Runners-up	2nd	1	0	1	0	1	1	+0	0.00
(South Korea) 2011 Suwon Cup	Champions	1st	3	1	2	0	4	3	+1	33.33
(Argentina) 2012 Copa Provincia del Chaco	Third Place	3rd	2	1	1	0	2	0	+2	50.00
Total	—	1 Title	15	4	7	4	16	16	+0	26.67

== Head-to-head record ==
The following table shows Uruguay's head-to-head record in the FIFA U-20 World Cup.

Opponent	Pld	W	D	L	GF	GA	GD	Win %
Argentina	2	0	0	2	1	4	−3	0.00
Australia	1	0	0	1	1	2	−1	0.00
Belgium	1	1	0	0	3	0	+3	100.00
Brazil	4	1	1	2	3	8	−5	25.00
Cameroon	1	0	0	1	0	1	−1	0.00
Croatia	1	0	0	1	0	1	−1	0.00
Ecuador	1	0	0	1	1	3	−2	0.00
England	3	1	1	1	3	3	+0	33.33
France	2	0	2	0	1	1	+0	0.00
Gambia	1	1	0	0	1	0	+1	100.00
Germany	1	1	0	0	2	1	+1	100.00
Ghana	3	1	2	0	6	5	+1	33.33
Guinea	1	1	0	0	5	0	+5	100.00
Honduras	2	2	0	0	3	0	+3	100.00
Hungary	2	2	0	0	4	1	+3	100.00
Iraq	2	1	1	0	5	1	+4	50.00
Israel	1	1	0	0	1	0	+1	100.00
Italy	3	2	1	0	2	0	+2	66.67
Ivory Coast	1	0	1	0	0	0	+0	0.00
Japan	2	1	0	1	3	2	+1	50.00
Jordan	1	1	0	0	1	0	+1	100.00
Malaysia	1	1	0	0	3	1	+2	100.00
Mali	3	0	1	2	2	4	−2	0.00
Mexico	1	0	0	1	1	2	−1	0.00
Morocco	2	1	1	0	3	0	+3	50.00
New Zealand	3	2	1	0	5	1	+4	66.67
Nigeria	1	1	0	0	2	1	+1	100.00
Norway	1	1	0	0	3	1	+2	100.00
Paraguay	1	0	1	0	2	2	+0	0.00
Poland	3	2	1	0	5	2	+3	66.67
Portugal	5	2	3	0	5	3	+2	40.00
Qatar	1	1	0	0	1	0	+1	100.00
Romania	1	0	0	1	1	2	−1	0.00
Saudi Arabia	1	1	0	0	1	0	+1	100.00
Serbia	1	1	0	0	1	0	+1	100.00
South Africa	1	0	1	0	0	0	+0	0.00
South Korea	2	1	0	1	2	2	+0	50.00
Soviet Union	2	1	1	0	1	0	+1	50.00
Spain	3	1	1	1	3	8	−5	33.33
Syria	1	0	0	1	0	1	−1	0.00
Tunisia	1	1	0	0	1	0	+1	100.00
United States	5	4	0	1	12	4	+8	80.00
Uzbekistan	2	2	0	0	7	0	+7	100.00
Venezuela	1	0	1	0	1	1	+0	0.00
Zambia	1	0	0	1	0	2	−2	0.00
Total	80	40	21	19	108	70	+38	50.00

== Honours ==
- FIFA U-20 World Cup:
  - Champions (1): 2023
  - Runners-up (2): 1997, 2013
  - Third place (1): 1979
- South American Youth Football Championship:
  - Winners (8): 1954, 1958, 1964, 1975, 1977, 1979, 1981, 2017
  - Runners-up (7): 1971, 1974, 1983, 1992, 1999, 2011, 2023
  - Third place (6): 1991, 2007, 2009, 2013, 2015, 2019
- COTIF L'Alcúdia International Football Tournament:
  - Winners (2): 2003, 2024
  - Runners-up (1): 2022
  - Third place (3): 1996, 2002, 2008

== See also ==
- Uruguay national football team
- Uruguay local national football team
- Uruguay national under-23 football team
- Uruguay national under-18 football team
- Uruguay national under-17 football team
- Uruguay national under-15 football team
- South American Youth Football Championship
- FIFA U-20 World Cup
