= Football at the 2011 Pan American Games – Men's team squads =

This article displays the squads for the football tournament at the 2011 Pan American Games in Guadalajara.

All players in this tournament had to be born on or after 1 January 1989. Each participating association had to name 18 players in the squad.

== Group A ==
=== Ecuador ===
Head coach: (Ecuador) Sixto Vizuete

No.	Pos.	Player	Date of birth (age)	Caps	Goals	Club
1	GK	John Jaramillo	September 15, 1991 (aged 20)			(Ecuadorian Football Federation) LDU Quito
2	DF	Juan Carlos Anangonó	March 29, 1989 (aged 22)			(Ecuadorian Football Federation) El Nacional
3	DF	John Narváez	December 6, 1991 (aged 19)			(Ecuadorian Football Federation) Deportivo Cuenca
4	DF	Deison Mendez	October 27, 1990 (aged 20)			(Ecuadorian Football Federation) Deportivo Cuenca
5	MF	Dennys Quiñonez	December 3, 1992 (aged 18)			(Ecuadorian Football Federation) Barcelona
6	DF	Edder Fuertes	March 27, 1992 (aged 19)			(Ecuadorian Football Federation) El Nacional
7	MF	Roberto Michael Castro	June 15, 1989 (aged 22)			(Ecuadorian Football Federation) Deportivo Quito
8	FW	Enner Valencia	April 11, 1989 (aged 22)			(Ecuadorian Football Federation) Emelec
9	FW	Luis Congo	February 27, 1989 (aged 22)			(Ecuadorian Football Federation) Imbabura
10	FW	Michael Quiñónez	June 21, 1984 (aged 27)			(Ecuadorian Football Federation) Deportivo Quito
11	MF	Alex Colón	November 17, 1986 (aged 24)			(Ecuadorian Football Federation) Técnico Universitario
12	GK	Johan Padilla	August 14, 1992 (aged 19)			(Ecuadorian Football Federation) Independiente José Terán
13	DF	Wilson Folleco	April 9, 1989 (aged 22)			(Ecuadorian Football Federation) Macará
14	DF	Carlos Quillupangui	September 15, 1989 (aged 22)			(Ecuadorian Football Federation) ESPOLI
15	MF	Danny Luna	May 25, 1991 (aged 20)			(Ecuadorian Football Federation) Rocafuerte
16	DF	Christian Cruz	January 8, 1992 (aged 19)			(Ecuadorian Football Federation) Barcelona
17	MF	Dixon Arroyo	January 6, 1992 (aged 19)			(Ecuadorian Football Federation) Deportivo Quito
18	FW	Marco Nazareno	March 19, 1993 (aged 18)			(Ecuadorian Football Federation) Deportivo Quito

=== Trinidad and Tobago ===
Head coach: (Trinidad and Tobago) Angus Eve

No.	Pos.	Player	Date of birth (age)	Caps	Goals	Club
1	GK	Andre Marchan	November 8, 1990 (aged 20)			(Trinidad and Tobago Football Association) W Connection
2	DF	Kareem Moses	November 2, 1990 (aged 20)			(Trinidad and Tobago Football Association) St. Ann's Rangers
3	DF	Mekeil Williams	July 24, 1990 (aged 21)			(Trinidad and Tobago Football Association) Caledonia AIA
4	DF	Sheldon Bateau	January 29, 1991 (aged 20)			(Trinidad and Tobago Football Association) San Juan Jabloteh
5	DF	Aquil Selby	June 4, 1990 (aged 21)			(Trinidad and Tobago Football Association) Caledonia AIA
6	DF	Leslie Russell	August 21, 1989 (aged 22)			(Trinidad and Tobago Football Association) San Juan Jabloteh
7	MF	Jayson Joseph	February 1, 1989 (aged 22)			(Trinidad and Tobago Football Association) Police FC
8	MF	Jeromie Williams	May 17, 1989 (aged 22)			(Trinidad and Tobago Football Association) North East Stars
9	FW	Jamal Gay	September 2, 1989 (aged 22)			(Trinidad and Tobago Football Association) Caledonia AIA
10	MF	Kevin Molino	June 17, 1990 (aged 21)			(United States Soccer Federation) Orlando City
11	MF	Micah Lewis	March 20, 1990 (aged 21)			(Trinidad and Tobago Football Association) Caledonia AIA
12	DF	Joevin Jones	March 8, 1991 (aged 20)			(Trinidad and Tobago Football Association) W Connection
13	MF	Shahdon Winchester	June 17, 1992 (aged 19)			(Trinidad and Tobago Football Association) W Connection
14	MF	Marcus Joseph	April 29, 1991 (aged 20)			(Trinidad and Tobago Football Association) T&TEC
15	FW	Trevin Caesar	April 26, 1989 (aged 22)			(Trinidad and Tobago Football Association) Caledonia AIA
16	FW	Cameron Roget	November 30, 1990 (aged 20)			(United States Soccer Federation) San Diego Boca FC
17	FW	Kaydion Gabriel	January 12, 1990 (aged 21)			(Trinidad and Tobago Football Association) North East Stars
18	GK	Zane Coker	December 9, 1989 (aged 21)			(Trinidad and Tobago Football Association) Caledonia AIA

=== Mexico ===
Head coach: (Mexico) Luis Fernando Tena

No.	Pos.	Player	Date of birth (age)	Caps	Goals	Club
1	GK	Jesús Corona	January 26, 1981 (aged 30)			(Mexican Football Federation) Cruz Azul
2	DF	Hugo Rodríguez	June 8, 1990 (aged 21)			(Mexican Football Federation) Atlas
3	DF	Hiram Mier	August 25, 1989 (aged 22)			(Mexican Football Federation) Monterrey
4	DF	Néstor Araujo	September 29, 1991 (aged 20)			(Mexican Football Federation) Cruz Azul
5	DF	Dárvin Chávez	January 21, 1989 (aged 22)			(Mexican Football Federation) Monterrey
6	MF	Jesús Zavala	July 21, 1987 (aged 24)			(Mexican Football Federation) Monterrey
7	MF	Javier Aquino	February 11, 1990 (aged 21)			(Mexican Football Federation) Cruz Azul
8	MF	Carlos Orrantía	February 1, 1991 (aged 20)			(Mexican Football Federation) UNAM
9	FW	Oribe Peralta	January 12, 1984 (aged 27)			(Mexican Football Federation) Santos Laguna
10	FW	Othoniel Arce	November 8, 1989 (aged 21)			(Mexican Football Federation) San Luis
11	FW	Jerónimo Amione	March 31, 1990 (aged 21)			(Mexican Football Federation) Atlante
12	GK	Antonio Rodríguez	April 7, 1992 (aged 19)			(Mexican Football Federation) Veracruz
13	MF	Ricardo Bocanegra	May 3, 1989 (aged 22)			(Mexican Football Federation) Atlas
14	MF	Jorge Enríquez	January 8, 1991 (aged 20)			(Mexican Football Federation) Guadalajara
15	DF	César Ibáñez	April 1, 1992 (aged 19)			(Mexican Football Federation) Santos Laguna
16	DF	Miguel Ángel Ponce	April 12, 1989 (aged 22)			(Mexican Football Federation) Guadalajara
17	MF	Isaác Brizuela	August 28, 1990 (aged 21)			(Mexican Football Federation) Toluca
18	DF	Diego Reyes	September 19, 1992 (aged 19)			(Mexican Football Federation) América

=== Uruguay ===
Head coach: (Uruguay) Juan Verzeri

No.	Pos.	Player	Date of birth (age)	Caps	Goals	Club
1	GK	Mathías Cubero	January 15, 1994 (aged 17)			(Uruguayan Football Association) Cerro
2	DF	Guillermo de los Santos	February 15, 1991 (aged 20)			(Uruguayan Football Association) Cerro
3	DF	Gastón Silva	March 5, 1994 (aged 17)			(Uruguayan Football Association) Defensor Sporting
4	DF	Adrián Gunino	February 3, 1989 (aged 22)			(Uruguayan Football Association) Peñarol
5	MF	Facundo Píriz	March 27, 1990 (aged 21)			(Uruguayan Football Association) Nacional
6	DF	Mauricio Prieto	September 26, 1987 (aged 24)			(Uruguayan Football Association) River Plate
7	MF	Leonardo Pais	July 7, 1994 (aged 17)			(Uruguayan Football Association) Defensor Sporting
8	MF	Gonzalo Papa	May 8, 1989 (aged 22)			(Uruguayan Football Association) Fenix
9	FW	Federico Puppo	December 6, 1986 (aged 24)	1	1	(Uruguayan Football Association) Danubio
10	FW	Tabaré Viudez	September 8, 1989 (aged 22)			(Uruguayan Football Association) Nacional
11	MF	Maxi Rodríguez	October 2, 1990 (aged 21)			(Uruguayan Football Association) Montevideo Wanderers
12	GK	Martín Rodríguez	July 20, 1989 (aged 22)			(Uruguayan Football Association) Montevideo Wanderers
13	FW	Santiago Silva	August 26, 1990 (aged 21)			(Uruguayan Football Association) Peñarol
14	MF	Emiliano Albín	January 24, 1989 (aged 22)			(Uruguayan Football Association) Peñarol
15	MF	Diego Rodríguez	September 4, 1989 (aged 22)			(Uruguayan Football Association) Defensor Sporting
16	DF	Mathías Abero	February 9, 1990 (aged 21)			(Uruguayan Football Association) Nacional
17	DF	Gianni Rodríguez	June 7, 1994 (aged 17)			(Uruguayan Football Association) Danubio
18	FW	Matías Britos	November 26, 1988 (aged 22)			(Uruguayan Football Association) Defensor Sporting

== Group B ==
=== Argentina ===
Head coach: (Colombia) (Argentina) Walter Perazzo

No.	Pos.	Player	Date of birth (age)	Caps	Goals	Club
1	GK	Esteban Andrada	January 26, 1991 (aged 20)			(Argentine Football Association) Lanús
2	DF	Germán Pezzella	June 27, 1991 (aged 20)			(Argentine Football Association) River Plate
3	DF	Lucas Kruspzky	April 6, 1992 (aged 19)			(Argentine Football Association) Independiente
4	DF	Hugo Nervo	January 6, 1991 (aged 20)			(Argentine Football Association) Arsenal de Sarandí
5	MF	Ezequiel Cirigliano	January 24, 1992 (aged 19)			(Argentine Football Association) River Plate
6	DF	Leandro González Pirez	February 26, 1992 (aged 19)			(Argentine Football Association) River Plate
7	MF	Matías Laba	December 11, 1991 (aged 19)			(Argentine Football Association) Argentinos Juniors
8	MF	Leonardo Ferreyra	October 21, 1991 (aged 19)			(Argentine Football Association) Gimnasia de Jujuy
9	FW	Carlos Luque	March 1, 1993 (aged 18)			(Argentine Football Association) Colón
10	MF	Michael Hoyos	August 2, 1991 (aged 20)			(Argentine Football Association) Estudiantes LP
11	FW	Sergio Araujo	January 28, 1992 (aged 19)			(Argentine Football Association) Boca Juniors
12	GK	Rodrigo Rey	March 3, 1991 (aged 20)			(Argentine Football Association) River Plate
13	DF	David Achucarro	January 5, 1991 (aged 20)			(Argentine Football Association) Boca Juniors
14	FW	Franco Fragapane	February 6, 1993 (aged 18)			(Argentine Football Association) Boca Juniors
15	MF	Lucas Villafáñez	October 4, 1991 (aged 20)			(Argentine Football Association) Independiente
16	DF	Adrián Martínez	February 13, 1992 (aged 19)			(Argentine Football Association) San Lorenzo
17	FW	Fernando Coniglio	November 24, 1991 (aged 19)			(Argentine Football Association) Rosario Central
18	MF	Alan Ruiz	August 19, 1993 (aged 18)			(Argentine Football Association) Gimnasia LP

=== Brazil ===
Head coach: (Brazil) Ney Franco

No.	Pos.	Player	Date of birth (age)	Caps	Goals	Club
1	GK	César	27 January 1992 (aged 19)			(Brazilian Football Confederation) Flamengo
2	DF	Mádson	January 13, 1992 (aged 19)			(Brazilian Football Confederation) Bahia
3	DF	Luccas Claro	March 30, 1994 (aged 17)			(Brazilian Football Confederation) Coritiba
4	DF	Romário Leiria	28 June 1992 (aged 19)			(Brazilian Football Confederation) Internacional
5	MF	Lucas Zen	June 17, 1991 (aged 20)			(Brazilian Football Confederation) Botafogo
6	DF	Henrique Miranda	May 10, 1993 (aged 18)			(Brazilian Football Confederation) São Paulo
7	FW	Leandro	May 12, 1993 (aged 18)			(Brazilian Football Confederation) Grêmio
8	MF	Djair	February 10, 1991 (aged 20)			(Brazilian Football Confederation) Coritiba
9	FW	Henrique Almeida	May 27, 1991 (aged 20)			(Brazilian Football Confederation) São Paulo
10	MF	Felipe Anderson	April 15, 1993 (aged 18)			(Brazilian Football Confederation) Santos
11	MF	Cidinho	January 28, 1993 (aged 18)			(Brazilian Football Confederation) Botafogo
12	GK	Douglas Pires	January 30, 1991 (aged 20)			(Brazilian Football Confederation) Cruzeiro
13	DF	Frauches	28 September 1992 (aged 19)			(Brazilian Football Confederation) Flamengo
14	FW	Sebá	June 8, 1992 (aged 19)			(Brazilian Football Confederation) Cruzeiro
15	MF	Misael	July 15, 1994 (aged 17)			(Brazilian Football Confederation) Grêmio
16	MF	Lucas Patinho	March 6, 1992 (aged 19)			(Brazilian Football Confederation) Fluminense
17	FW	Rafael	July 13, 1992 (aged 19)			(Brazilian Football Confederation) Bahia
18	FW	Felipe Amorim	January 4, 1991 (aged 20)			(Brazilian Football Confederation) Goiás

=== Costa Rica ===
Head coach: (Costa Rica) Carlos Watson

No.	Pos.	Player	Date of birth (age)	Caps	Goals	Club
1	GK	Kevin Briceño	October 21, 1991 (aged 19)			(Costa Rican Football Federation) Orión
2	DF	Jordan Smith	April 23, 1991 (aged 20)			(Costa Rican Football Federation) Saprissa
3	DF	Rudy Dawson	August 5, 1988 (aged 23)			(Costa Rican Football Federation) Uruguay
4	DF	Derrick Johnson	July 28, 1989 (aged 22)			(Costa Rican Football Federation) Limón
5	MF	Gualberto Montenegro	February 2, 1991 (aged 20)			(Costa Rican Football Federation) Saprissa
6	DF	Joseph Mora	January 15, 1993 (aged 18)			(Costa Rican Football Federation) Belén
7	MF	Danny Blanco	January 9, 1992 (aged 19)			(Costa Rican Football Federation) Alajuelense
8	MF	Jorge Davis	August 11, 1985 (aged 26)			(Costa Rican Football Federation) Alajuelense
9	FW	Jonathan McDonald	October 28, 1987 (aged 23)			(Costa Rican Football Federation) Alajuelense
10	MF	Dylan Flores	May 30, 1993 (aged 18)			(Costa Rican Football Federation) Saprissa
11	FW	Bryan Vega	May 27, 1991 (aged 20)			(Costa Rican Football Federation) Belén
12	DF	Keyner Brown	December 30, 1991 (aged 19)			(Costa Rican Football Federation) Orión
13	DF	Jean Carlos Sanchez	April 19, 1992 (aged 19)			(Costa Rican Football Federation) Herediano
14	MF	Oscar Villalobos	August 15, 1990 (aged 21)			(Costa Rican Football Federation) Santos
15	MF	Carlos Ochoa	February 10, 1992 (aged 19)			(Costa Rican Football Federation) Uruguay
16	MF	Carlos Viales	November 7, 1991 (aged 19)			(Costa Rican Football Federation) Liberia
17	MF	Deyver Vega	September 19, 1992 (aged 19)			(Costa Rican Football Federation) Saprissa
18	GK	Ricardo Rojas	March 1, 1992 (aged 19)			(Costa Rican Football Federation) Saprissa

=== Cuba ===
Head coach: (Cuba) Chandler González

No.	Pos.	Player	Date of birth (age)	Caps	Goals	Club
1	GK	Odisnel Cooper				(Football Association of Cuba) FC Camagüey
2	DF	Dayan Hernandez				(Football Association of Cuba) FC Cienfuegos
3	DF	Jorge Luis Corrales				(Football Association of Cuba) FC Pinar del Río
4	DF	Jose Dairon Macias				(Football Association of Cuba) FC Villa Clara
5	DF	Renay Malblanche				(Football Association of Cuba) FC Holguín
6	DF	Ernesto Duanes				(Football Association of Cuba) FC Ciego de Ávila
7	MF	Ricardo Peña				(Football Association of Cuba) Ciudad de La Habana
8	DF	Dalain Aira				(Football Association of Cuba) Ciudad de La Habana
9	FW	Heviel Cordoves				(Football Association of Cuba) Ciudad de La Habana
10	MF	Maikel Chang				(Football Association of Cuba) Ciudad de La Habana
11	FW	Yasnay Rivero				(Football Association of Cuba) FC La Habana
12	GK	Andy Ramos				(Football Association of Cuba) FC Matanzas
13	MF	Carlos Domingo Francisco				(Football Association of Cuba) FC Santiago de Cuba
14	DF	Carlos Castellanos				(Football Association of Cuba) FC Matanzas
15	DF	Adrián Diz	4 March 1993 (aged 18) -->			(Football Association of Cuba) FC Las Tunas
16	MF	Over Urguelles	-- Missing required parameter 1=month! , (aged −15) -->			(Football Association of Cuba) FC Guantánamo
17	MF	Dairon Blanco	-- Missing required parameter 1=month! , (aged −15) -->			(Football Association of Cuba) FC La Habana
18	DF	Francisco Luis Salazar				(Football Association of Cuba) FC Villa Clara

- (N°1)Odisnel Cooper GK 31/03/1992 F.C. Camaguey (Cuba) *(N°2)Dayan Hernandez DF 09/04/1991 F.C. Cienfuegos (Cuba) *(N°3)Jorge Luis Corrales DF 20/05/1991 F.C. Pinar del Rio (Cuba) *(N°4)Jose Dairon Macias DF 10/05/1991 F.C. Villa Clara (Cuba) *(N°5)Renay Malblanche DF 08/08/1991 F.C. Holguin (Cuba) *(N°6)Ernesto Duanes DF 01/06/1992 F.C. Ciego de Avila (Cuba) *(N°7)Ricardo Peña MF 21/12/1992 CF Ciudad de La Habana (Cuba) *(N°8)Dalain Aira DF 26/10/1989 CF Ciudad de La Habana (Cuba) *(N°9)Heviel Cordoves FW 10/11/1989 CF Ciudad de La Habana (Cuba) *(N°10)Maikel Chang MF 18/04/1991 CF Ciudad de La Habana (Cuba) *(N°11)Yasnay Rivero FW 11/07/1991 CF Ciudad de La Habana (Cuba) *(N°12)Andy Ramos GK 23/02/1991 F.C. Matanzas (Cuba) *(N°13)Carlos Domingo Francisco MF 22/05/1990 F.C. Santiago de Cuba (Cuba) *(N°14)Carlos Castellanos DF 08/09/1991 F.C. Matanzas (Cuba) *(N°15)Adrian Diz DF 04/03/1994 F.C. Las Tunas (Cuba) *(N°16)Over Urgelles MF 14/01/1992 F.C. Guantanamo (Cuba) *(N°17)Dairon Blanco MF 02/10/1992 F.C. Las Tunas (Cuba) *(N°18)Francisco Luis Salazar MF 21/03/1992 F.C. Villa Clara (Cuba)
