= Football at the 2011 Pan American Games =

- Venue: Estadio Omnilife
- Dates: October 18–28
- Competitors: 287 from 12 nations

Football at the 2011 Pan American Games was held in Zapopan, Mexico from October 18 to October 28. Associations affiliated with FIFA were invited to send their full women's national teams and men's U-22 teams to participate. In addition teams are allowed to enter a maximum of eighteen athletes.

For these games, the men and women competed in an 8-team tournament, a reduction of 4 teams for men and 2 for women, who competed with 10 teams, from the previous edition of the games.

== Medal summary ==
=== Medal table ===
* Host nation (Mexico)

Rank	Nation	Gold	Silver	Bronze	Total
1	Mexico*	1	0	1	2
2	Canada	1	0	0	1
3	Argentina	0	1	0	1
3	Brazil	0	1	0	1
5	Uruguay	0	0	1	1
Totals (5 entries)		2	2	2	6

=== Events ===
Event	Gold	Silver	Bronze
Men	Mexico; José de Jesús Corona; Hugo Isaác Rodríguez; Hiram Mier; Néstor Araujo; Dárvin Chávez; Jesús Zavala; Javier Aquino; Carlos Emilio Orrantía; Oribe Peralta; Othoniel Arce; Jerónimo Amione; José Antonio Rodríguez; Ricardo Bocanegra; Jorge Enríquez; César Ibáñez; Miguel Ángel Ponce; Isaác Brizuela; Diego Reyes	Argentina; Esteban Andrada; Germán Pezzella; Lucas Kruspzky; Hugo Nervo; Ezequiel Cirigliano; Leandro González Pírez; Matías Laba; Leonardo Ferreyra; Carlos Luque; Michael Hoyos; Sergio Araujo; Rodrigo Rey; David Achucarro; Franco Fragapane; Lucas Villafáñez; Adrián Martínez; Fernando Coniglio; Alan Ruiz	Uruguay; Mathías Cubero; Guillermo de los Santos; Gastón Silva; Adrián Gunino; Facundo Píriz; Mauricio Prieto; Leonardo Pais; Gonzalo Papa; Federico Puppo; Tabaré Viudez; Maxi Rodríguez; Martín Rodríguez; Santiago Silva; Emiliano Albín; Diego Rodríguez; Mathías Abero; Gianni Rodríguez; Matías Britos
Women	Canada; Rachelle Beanlands; Melanie Booth; Candace Chapman; Robyn Gayle; Christina Julien; Kaylyn Kyle; Karina LeBlanc; Vanessa Legault-Cordisco; Diana Matheson; Kelly Parker; Sophie Schmidt; Desiree Scott; Lauren Sesselmann; Diamond Simpson; Christine Sinclair; Brittany Timko; Rhian Wilkinson; Shannon Woeller	Brazil; Francielle Alberto; Rosana Augusto; Barbara Barbosa; Daniele Batista; Renata Costa; Debora De Oliveira; Maurine Gonçalves; Thaís Guedes; Beatriz João; Miraildes Mota; Grazielle Nascimento; Tania Pereira; Thaís Picarte; Karen Rocha; Daiane Rodrigues; Andreia Santos; Renata Santos; Ketlen Wiggers	Mexico; Cecilia Santiago; Erika Venegas; Kenti Robles; Rubí Sandoval; Jennifer Ruiz; Valeria Miranda; Mónica Vergara; Marylin Díaz; Luz del Rosario Saucedo; Stephany Mayor; Guadalupe Worbis; Dinora Garza; Liliana Mercado; Liliana Godoy; Verónica Pérez; Maribel Domínguez; Mónica Ocampo; Tanya Samarzich

== Venue ==
Zapopan (Guadalajara Area)	Football at the 2011 Pan American Games is located in Mexico
Estadio Omnilife	Football at the 2011 Pan American Games is located in Mexico
Capacity: 49,850	Football at the 2011 Pan American Games is located in Mexico

== Men ==
CONCACAF	CONMEBOL	Automatic qualifiers
Cuba; Costa Rica; Trinidad and Tobago	Brazil; Uruguay; Argentina; Ecuador	Mexico

== Women ==
CONCACAF	CONMEBOL	Automatic qualifiers
Costa Rica; Trinidad and Tobago	Brazil; Colombia; Chile; Argentina	Mexico; Canada

== Schedule ==
The competition was spread out across eleven days, with the men and women competing on alternating dates.

Preliminary round	Semifinals	M	Event finals

October	18th Tue	19th Wed	20th Thu	21st Fri	22nd Sat	23rd Sun	24th Mon	25th Tue	26th Wed	27th Thu	28th Fri	Gold medals
Men											M	1
Women										M		1
