= Football at the 2011 Pan American Games – Men's tournament =

Men's football tournament at the 2011 Pan American Games
- Venue: Estadio Omnilife
- Dates: 19 – 28 October
- Competitors: 144 from 8 nations

Medalists
Gold medal	Mexico
Silver medal	Argentina
Bronze medal	Uruguay

The men's association football tournament at the 2011 Pan American Games was held in Guadalajara, Mexico at the Estadio Omnilife from 19 to 28 October 2011. Associations affiliated with FIFA were invited to send their men's U-22 national teams, with 3 no-age-limit players per team allowed. Ecuador were the defending champions from the 2007 Pan American Games in Rio de Janeiro, Brazil, defeating Jamaica 2–1, but they were eliminated during the group stage.

For these Games, the men competed in an eight-team tournament, which is a drop from 12 at the 2007 games. Preliminary matches commenced on 19 October. The teams were grouped into two pools of four teams each for a round-robin preliminary round. The top two teams in each pool advanced to a four-team single-elimination bracket.

Mexico won the gold medal for the fourth time in this competition, defeating six-time gold-medalists Argentina in the tournament's final. Uruguay took the bronze medal.

== Teams ==
=== Qualification ===
Event	Date	Location	Vacancies	Qualified
Host Nation	–	–	1	Mexico
CONCACAF Qualifying Tournament	28 March – 10 April 2011	Guatemala	3*	Cuba; Costa Rica; ~~Guatemala~~; Trinidad and Tobago*
CONMEBOL Qualifying Tournament	12 March – 9 April 2011	Ecuador	4	Brazil; Uruguay; Argentina; Ecuador
TOTAL			8	

- The highest finisher from each the Caribbean and Central American regions will qualify, along with the best qualifying team from either region.
- Guatemala later withdrew due to issues of discipline within the team. They were replaced by Trinidad and Tobago, after Honduras and Panama who finished ahead of Trinidad and Tobago declined to participate.

=== Squads ===
The men's tournament is a full international tournament with a U-22 age limit. Each nation must submit a squad of 18 players September 2011. A minimum of two goalkeepers (plus one optional alternate goalkeeper) must be included in the squad.

- Argentina
- Brazil
- Costa Rica
- Cuba
- Ecuador
- Trinidad and Tobago
- Mexico
- Uruguay

== Format ==
- Eight teams are split into 2 preliminary round groups of 4 teams each. The top 2 teams from each group qualify for the knockout stage.
- The third and fourth placed teams are eliminated from the competition.
- In the semifinals, the matchups are as follows: A1 vs. B2 and B1 vs. A2
- The winning teams from the semifinals play for the gold medal. The losing teams compete for the bronze medal.

== Preliminary round ==
All times are local Central Daylight Time (UTC-5)

=== Group A ===
Pos	Team	Pld	W	D	L	GF	GA	GD	Pts	Qualification
1	Mexico	3	2	1	0	8	4	+4	7	Advance to Semifinals
2	Uruguay	3	1	1	1	4	6	−2	4	Advance to Semifinals
3	Trinidad and Tobago	3	0	3	0	3	3	0	3	
4	Ecuador	3	0	1	2	2	4	−2	1	

19 October 2011
20:00

Mexico	2–1	Ecuador
Peralta 25'; Enriquez 80'		Congo 8'

Estadio Omnilife, Guadalajara
Referee: Marlon Mejía (El Salvador)
21 October 2011
13:00

Ecuador	0–1	Uruguay
		Puppo 4'

Estadio Omnilife, Guadalajara
Referee: Erick Roberto Andino (Honduras)

21 October 2011
20:00

Mexico	1–1	Trinidad and Tobago
Peralta 30'	Report	Gay 12'

Estadio Omnilife, Guadalajara
Referee: Omar Ponce (Ecuador)
23 October 2011
10:00

Trinidad and Tobago	1–1	Ecuador
Casear 69'		Quiñonez 17'

Estadio Omnilife, Guadalajara
Referee: David Gantar (Canada)

23 October 2011
17:00

Mexico	5–2	Uruguay
Amione 15', 48'; Ponce 29'; Zavala 42'; Peralta 71'	Report	Prieto 51'; M. Rodríguez 57'

Estadio Omnilife, Guadalajara
Referee: Raúl Orosco (Bolivia)
25 October 2011*
10:00

Uruguay	1–1	Trinidad and Tobago
Abero 17'		Winchester 10'

Estadio Omnilife, Guadalajara
Referee: Marlon Mejía (El Salvador)
- Match was moved to 25 October, because of a volcanic eruption spewed ash clouds in Chile which prevented the team from Uruguay to travel to Guadalajara in time.

=== Group B ===
Pos	Team	Pld	W	D	L	GF	GA	GD	Pts	Qualification
1	Argentina	3	2	1	0	5	1	+4	7	Advance to Semifinals
2	Costa Rica	3	2	0	1	4	4	0	6	Advance to Semifinals
3	Brazil	3	0	2	1	2	4	−2	2	
4	Cuba	3	0	1	2	0	2	−2	1	

19 October 2011
10:00

Costa Rica	1–0	Cuba
Blanco 55'	Report

Estadio Omnilife, Guadalajara
Referee: Ricardo Arellano (Mexico)
19 October 2011
17:00

Argentina	1–1	Brazil
Araujo 74'		Henrique 63'

Estadio Omnilife, Guadalajara
Referee: Omar Ponce (Ecuador)

21 October 2011
10:00

Costa Rica	0–3	Argentina
		Fragapane 40'; Pezzella 60'; Kruspzky 76'

Estadio Omnilife, Guadalajara
Referee: David Gantar (Canada)
21 October 2011
17:00

Brazil	0–0	Cuba
	Report

Estadio Omnilife, Guadalajara
Referee: Raúl Orosco (Bolivia)

23 October 2011
13:00

Cuba	0–1	Argentina
		Laba 79'

Estadio Omnilife, Guadalajara
Referee: Erick Roberto Andino (Honduras)
23 October 2011
20:00

Brazil	1–3	Costa Rica
Henrique 30'		B. Vega 1'; McDonald 20', 43'

Estadio Omnilife, Guadalajara
Referee: Ricardo Arellano (Mexico)

== Knockout stage ==
Semi-finals
26 October – Guadalajara
Mexico	3
Costa Rica	0
26 October – Guadalajara
Argentina	1
Uruguay	0

Final
28 October – Guadalajara
Mexico	1
Argentina	0
Third place
28 October – Guadalajara
Costa Rica	1
Uruguay	2

=== Semifinals ===
26 October 2011
17:00

Mexico	3–0	Costa Rica
Peralta 19', 38', 46'	Report

Estadio Omnilife, Guadalajara
Referee: Erick Roberto Andino (Honduras)

26 October 2011
20:00

Argentina	1–0	Uruguay
Pezzella 9'	Report

Estadio Omnilife, Guadalajara
Referee: Omar Ponce (Ecuador)

=== Bronze Medal match ===
28 October 2011
17:00

Costa Rica	1–2	Uruguay
McDonald 81' (pen.)	Report	G. Silva 48'; Píriz 61'

Estadio Omnilife, Guadalajara
Referee: Raúl Orosco (Bolivia)

=== Gold Medal match ===
28 October 2011
20:00

Mexico	1–0	Argentina
Amione 75'	Report

Estadio Omnilife, Guadalajara
Referee: Marlon Mejía (El Salvador)

Team details

Mexico
Argentina

GK	1	José Corona
DF	3	Hiram Mier
DF	4	Néstor Araujo
DF	16	Miguel Ángel Ponce
DF	5	Dárvin Chávez
MF	6	Jesús Zavala
MF	13	Ricardo Bocanegra	(substituted off) 77'
MF	15	César Ibáñez
FW	7	Javier Aquino	(substituted off) 90'
FW	9	Oribe Peralta
FW	11	Jerónimo Amione	(substituted off) 82'
Substitutes:
DF	14	Jorge Enríquez	(substituted on) 77'
FW	17	Isaác Brizuela	(substituted on) 82'
DF	2	Hugo Rodríguez	(substituted on) 90'
Manager:
(Mexico) Luis F. Tena

GK	1	Esteban Andrada
DF	4	Hugo Nervo	(substituted off) 81'
DF	2	Germán Pezzella
DF	13	David Achucarro
MF	6	Leandro González
MF	7	Matías Laba	(substituted off) 81'
MF	5	Ezequiel Cirigliano
MF	16	Adrián Martínez
FW	14	Franco Fragapane
FW	9	Carlos Luque	(substituted off) 90'
FW	11	Sergio Araujo
Substitutes:
MF	15	Lucas Villafáñez	(substituted on) 81'
MF	17	Fernando Coniglio	(substituted on) 81'
	8	Leandro M. Ferreira	(substituted on) 90'
Manager:
(Argentina) Walter Perazzo

2011 Pan American Games Men's football tournament
Winners

Mexico
4th title

== Goalscorers ==
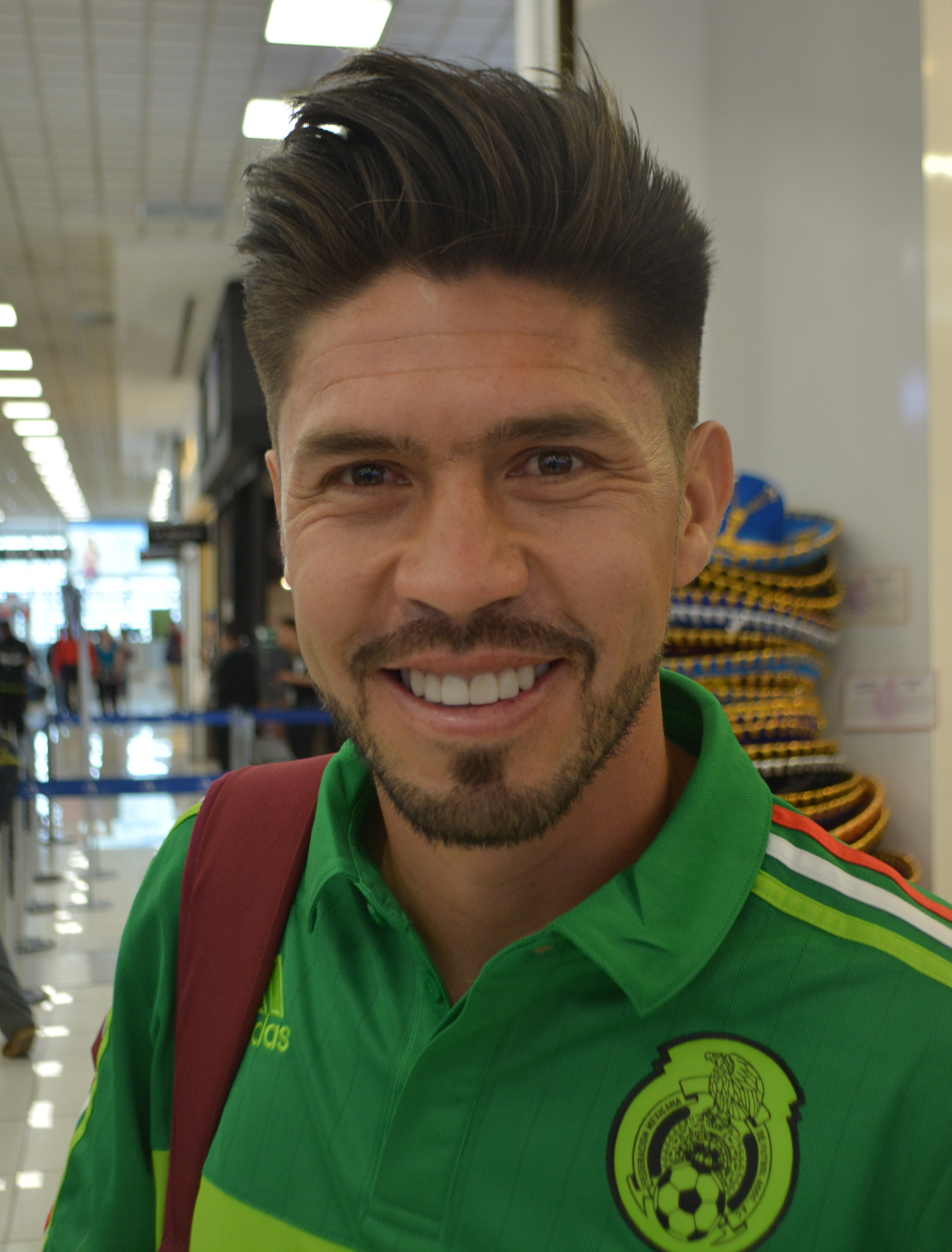
Oribe Peralta, top scorer

6 goals

- (Mexico) Oribe Peralta

3 goals

- (Costa Rica) Jonathan McDonald
- (Mexico) Jerónimo Amione

2 goals

- (Argentina) Germán Pezzella
- (Brazil) Henrique

1 goal

- (Argentina) Sergio Araujo
- (Argentina) Franco Fragapane
- (Argentina) Lucas Kruspzky
- (Argentina) Matías Laba
- (Costa Rica) Danny Blanco
- (Ecuador) Luis Congo
- (Ecuador) Michael Quiñónez
- (Mexico) Jorge Enríquez
- (Mexico) Miguel Ángel Ponce
- (Mexico) Jesús Zavala
- (Trinidad and Tobago) Trevin Caesar
- (Trinidad and Tobago) Jamal Gay
- (Trinidad and Tobago) Shahdon Winchester
- (Uruguay) Mathías Abero
- (Uruguay) Facundo Píriz
- (Uruguay) Mauricio Prieto
- (Uruguay) Federico Puppo
- (Uruguay) Maximiliano Rodríguez
- (Uruguay) Gastón Silva

== Medalists ==
Event	Gold	Silver	Bronze
Men's football	Mexico José de Jesús Corona; Hugo Isaác Rodríguez; Hiram Mier; Néstor Araujo; Dárvin Chávez; Jesús Zavala; Javier Aquino; Carlos Emilio Orrantía; Oribe Peralta; Othoniel Arce; Jerónimo Amione; José Antonio Rodríguez; Ricardo Bocanegra; Jorge Enríquez; César Ibáñez; Miguel Ángel Ponce; Isaác Brizuela; Diego Reyes	Argentina; Esteban Andrada; Germán Pezzella; Lucas Kruspzky; Hugo Nervo; Ezequiel Cirigliano; Leandro González Pirez; Matías Laba; Leonardo Ferreyra; Carlos Luque; Michael Hoyos; Sergio Araujo; Rodrigo Rey; David Achucarro; Franco Fragapane; Lucas Villafáñez; Adrián Martínez; Fernando Coniglio; Alan Ruiz	Uruguay; Mathías Cubero; Guillermo de los Santos; Gastón Silva; Adrián Gunino; Facundo Píriz; Mauricio Prieto; Leonardo Pais; Gonzalo Papa; Federico Puppo; Tabaré Viudez; Maxi Rodríguez; Martín Rodríguez; Santiago Silva; Emiliano Albín; Diego Rodríguez; Mathías Abero; Gianni Rodríguez; Matías Britos

== Final standings ==
Rank	Team	Record
Gold medal	Mexico	4–1–0
Silver medal	Argentina	3–1–1
Bronze medal	Uruguay	2–1–2
4	Costa Rica	2–0–3
5	Trinidad and Tobago	0–3–0
6	Brazil	0–2–1
7	Ecuador	0–1–2
8	Cuba	0–1–2
