= 2011 FIFA U-17 World Cup =

Copa Mundial Sub-17 de la FIFA México 2011

Tournament details
- Host country: Mexico
- Dates: 18 June – 10 July
- Teams: 24 (from 6 confederations)
- Venues: 7 (in 7 host cities)

Final positions
- Champions: Mexico (2nd title)
- Runners-up: Uruguay
- Third place: Germany
- Fourth place: Brazil

Tournament statistics
- Matches played: 52
- Goals scored: 158 (3.04 per match)
- Attendance: 1,002,314 (19,275 per match)
- Top scorer: (Ivory Coast) Souleymane Coulibaly (9 goals)
- Best player: (Mexico) Julio Gómez
- Best goalkeeper: (Uruguay) Mathías Cubero
- Fair play award: Japan

The 2011 FIFA U-17 World Cup was the 14th edition of the FIFA U-17 World Cup, the biennial international men's youth football championship contested by the under-17 national teams of the member associations of FIFA. It was hosted by Mexico from 18 June to 10 July 2011. Mexico won the tournament after defeating Uruguay 2–0 in the final, claiming the country's second title. Mexico also became the first host nation to win the FIFA U-17 World Cup.

Players born after 1 January 1994 could participate in this tournament.

== Host selection ==
It was confirmed by the 58th FIFA Congress in Sydney, Australia that Mexico would be the host, beating other bids from the Czech Republic and Iran.

== Venues ==
After having won the right to host the 2011 FIFA U-17 World Cup, Femexfut president, Justino Compéan, stated during an interview from Sydney, Australia, that the Estadio Corona, in Torreón, would be one of the venues, arguing that recently built or invested stadia would have a major preference. He also mentioned Monterrey, Ciudad Juárez, Querétaro, Tijuana, Pachuca and Aguascalientes as other possible venues.

The Estadio Azteca in Mexico City, having previously hosted major events such as 1970 and 1986 FIFA World Cup, 1983 FIFA World Youth Championship, 1999 FIFA Confederations Cup and 1968 Summer Olympics Football final matches, hosted the tournament's third place match and final.

Mexico City	Guadalajara (Zapopan, Jalisco)	Monterrey (San Nicolás de los Garza, Nuevo León)
Estadio Azteca	Estadio Omnilife (Estadio Guadalajara)	Estadio Universitario
19°18′10.8″N 99°09′01.59″W	20°40′54.00″N 103°27′46.00″W	25°43′22.10″N 100°18′43.40″W
Capacity: 105,000	Capacity: 49,850	Capacity: 42,000
Morelia	Location of the host cities of the 2011 FIFA U-17 World Cup.	
Estadio Morelos	Location of the host cities of the 2011 FIFA U-17 World Cup.	
19°43′07.47″N 101°14′01.04″W	Location of the host cities of the 2011 FIFA U-17 World Cup.	
Capacity: 35,000	Location of the host cities of the 2011 FIFA U-17 World Cup.	
Querétaro	Pachuca	Torreón
Estadio Corregidora	Estadio Hidalgo	Estadio Corona (Estadio Torreón)
20°34′39.6″N 100°21′58.9″W	20°06′18.52″N 98°45′22.01″W	25°33′18″N 103°24′11″W
Capacity: 33,277	Capacity: 30,000	Capacity: 30,000

== Teams ==
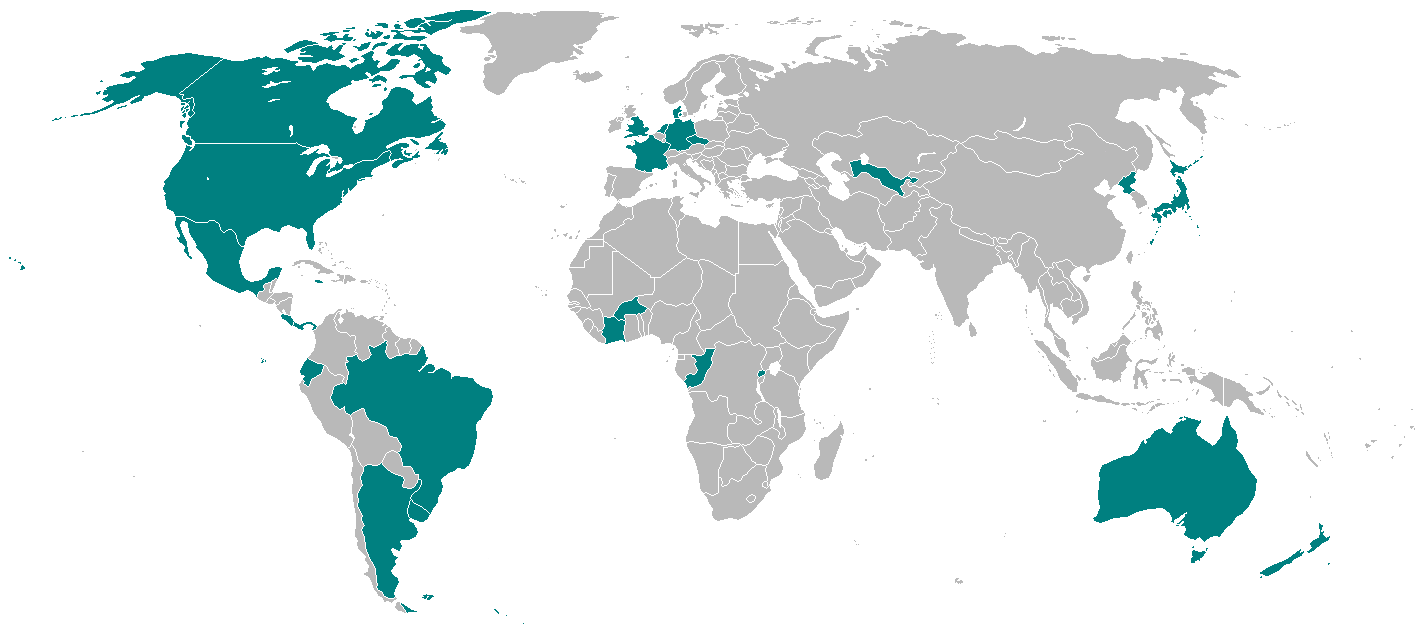
Qualified teams

In addition to host nation Mexico, 23 nations qualified from six separate continental competitions.

Confederation	Qualifying Tournament	Qualifier(s)
AFC (Asia)	2010 AFC U-16 Championship	North Korea; Uzbekistan^{1} Australia; Japan
CAF (Africa)	2011 African Under-17 Championship	Burkina Faso; Rwanda^{1} Congo; Ivory Coast
CONCACAF (Central, North America and Caribbean)	Host nation	Mexico
CONCACAF (Central, North America and Caribbean)	2011 CONCACAF U-17 Championship	United States; Canada; Panama^{1} Jamaica
CONMEBOL (South America)	2011 South American Under-17 Football Championship	Brazil; Uruguay; Argentina; Ecuador
OFC (Oceania)	2011 OFC Under 17 Tournament	New Zealand
UEFA (Europe)	2011 UEFA European Under-17 Championship	Netherlands; Germany; Denmark^{1} England; Czech Republic^{2} France

1.Teams that made their debut.
2.Czech Republic made their debut as independent nation. The now-defunct Czechoslovakia qualified for their only appearance in 1993.

== Match officials ==
Confederation	Referee	Assistants
AFC	Nawaf Shukralla (Bahrain)	Yaser Tulefat (Bahrain); Khaled Al-Allan (Bahrain)
AFC	Ali Al-Badwawi (United Arab Emirates)	Hamad Al-Mayahi (Oman); Reza Sokhandan (Iran)
CAF	Hélder Martins de Carvalho (Angola)	Félicien Kabanda (Rwanda); Aden Marwa (Kenya)
CAF	Néant Alioum (Cameroon)	Djibril Camara (Senegal); Zakhele Siwela (South Africa)
CONCACAF	Raymon Bogle (Jamaica)	Stephen Brown (Jamaica); Dion Neil (Trinidad and Tobago)
CONCACAF	Roberto García (Mexico)	Alejandro Ayala (Mexico); Víctor Calderón (Mexico)
CONCACAF	Paul Delgadillo (Mexico)	Marcos Quintero (Mexico); Salvador Rodríguez (Mexico)
CONCACAF	Jafeth Perea (Panama)	Ricardo Daniel Ake (Belize); Juan Antonio Rodas (Honduras)
CONCACAF	Elmer Bonilla (El Salvador)	Keytzel Corrales (Nicaragua); Octavio Jarra (Costa Rica)
CONMEBOL	Diego Abal (Argentina)	Alejo Castany (Argentina); Gustavo Esquivel (Argentina)
CONMEBOL	Omar Ponce (Ecuador)	Carlos Herrera (Ecuador); Christian Lescano (Ecuador)
CONMEBOL	Víctor Hugo Carrillo (Peru)	Jonny Bossio (Peru); César Escano (Peru)
OFC	Norbert Hauata (Tahiti)	Mark Rule (New Zealand); David Charles (Papua New Guinea)
UEFA	Pavel Královec (Czech Republic)	Martin Wilczek (Czech Republic); Miroslav Zlámal (Czech Republic)
UEFA	Tony Chapron (France)	Emmanuel Boisdenghien (France); Fredji Harchay (France)
UEFA	Bas Nijhuis (Netherlands)	Angelo Boonman (Netherlands); Erwin Zeinstra (Netherlands)
UEFA	Svein Oddvar Moen (Norway)	Frank Andås (Norway); Kim Haglund (Norway)
UEFA	Aleksei Nikolaev (Russia)	Anton Averianov (Russia); Tikhon Kalugin (Russia)
UEFA	Stephan Studer (Switzerland)	Sandro Pozzi (Switzerland); Raffael Zeder (Switzerland)

== Group stage ==
The draw for the group stage took place on 17 May 2011 at the Universidad Nacional Autónoma de México's Sala Nezahualcóyotl concert Hall. The seeding was as follows:

Pot A	Pot B	Pot C	Pot D
Mexico; Germany; England; Brazil; Argentina; United States	Congo; Burkina Faso; Ivory Coast; Rwanda; Jamaica; New Zealand	Canada; Panama; Japan; North Korea; Australia; Uzbekistan	Denmark; Netherlands; France; Czech Republic; Uruguay; Ecuador

The winners and runners-up from each group, as well as the best four third-placed teams, qualified for the first round of the knockout stage (round of 16).

Tie-breaking criteria

Where two or more teams end the group stage with the same number of points, their ranking is determined by the following criteria:

- goal difference in all group matches;
- number of goals scored in all group matches;
- points earned in the matches between the teams concerned;
- goal difference in the matches between the teams concerned;
- number of goals scored in the group matches between the teams concerned;
- drawing of lots by the organising committee.

Ranking of third place teams in each group are determined by the following criteria, top four advances to the round of 16:

- number of points
- goal difference in all group matches;
- number of goals scored in all group matches;
- drawing of lots by the organising committee.

All kick-off times are local (UTC−05:00).

=== Group A ===
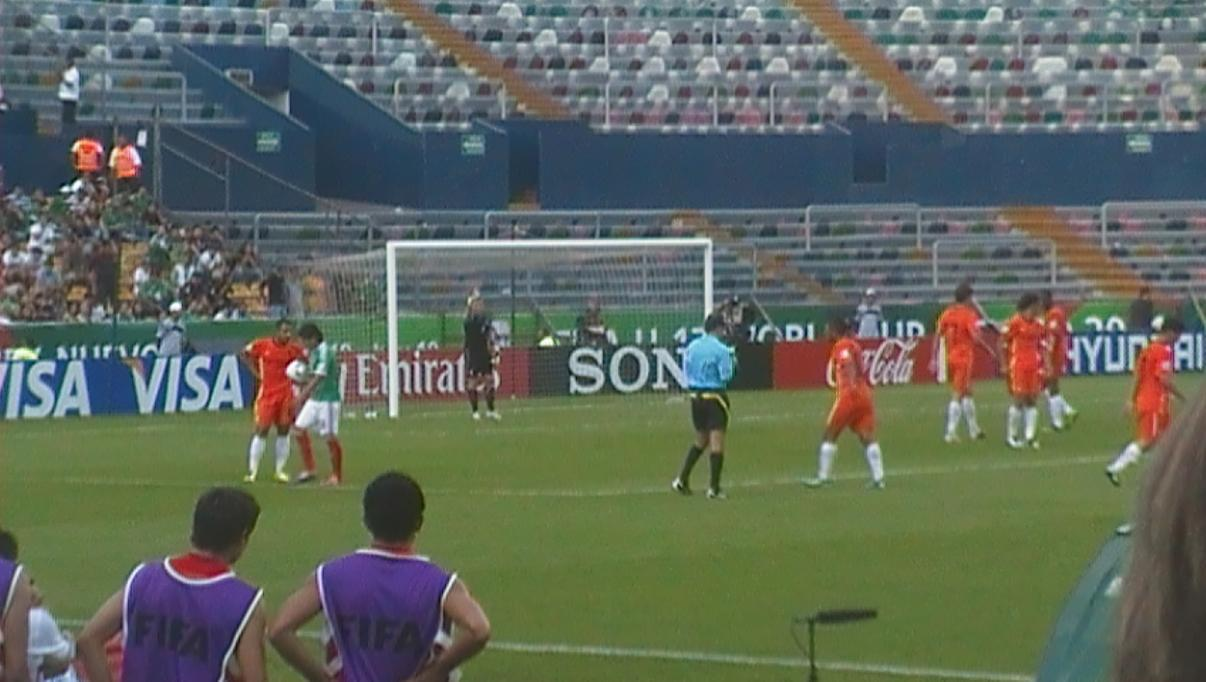
Free Kick on the Mexico – Netherlands match

Pos	Team	Pld	W	D	L	GF	GA	GD	Pts	Group stage result
1	Mexico (H)	3	3	0	0	8	4	+4	9	Advanced to knockout stage
2	Congo	3	1	1	1	3	3	0	4	Advanced to knockout stage
3	North Korea	3	0	2	1	3	5	−2	2	
4	Netherlands	3	0	1	2	3	5	−2	1	

(H) Hosts
18 June 2011
15:00

Mexico	3–1	North Korea
Fierro 37'; Jong Kwang-Sok 68' (o.g.); Casillas 86'	Report	Jo Kwang 3'

Estadio Morelos, Morelia
Attendance: 34,312
Referee: Stephan Studer (Switzerland)

18 June 2011
18:00

Congo	1–0	Netherlands
M. Nkounkou 53'	Report

Estadio Morelos, Morelia
Attendance: 34,312
Referee: Jafaeth Perea Amador (Panama)

21 June 2011
15:00

North Korea	1–1	Netherlands
Kang Nam-Gwon 48'	Report	Gravenberch 75'

Estadio Morelos, Morelia
Attendance: 7,500
Referee: Néant Alioum (Cameroon)

21 June 2011
18:00

Mexico	2–1	Congo
Espericueta 40'; Gómez 85'	Report	Epako 73'

Estadio Morelos, Morelia
Attendance: 25,710
Referee: Tony Chapron (France)

24 June 2011
18:00

North Korea	1–1	Congo
Ju Jong-Chol 14'	Report	C. Nkounkou 75'

Estadio Morelos, Morelia
Attendance: 14,206
Referee: Pavel Královec (Czech Republic)

24 June 2011
18:00

Mexico	3–2	Netherlands
Casillas 29'; Fierro 43'; González 90+4'	Report	Depay 47'; Ebecilio 63'

Estadio Universitario, Monterrey
Attendance: 29,000
Referee: Víctor Hugo Carrillo (Peru)

=== Group B ===
Pos	Team	Pld	W	D	L	GF	GA	GD	Pts	Group stage result
1	Japan	3	2	1	0	5	2	+3	7	Advanced to knockout stage
2	France	3	1	2	0	5	2	+3	5	Advanced to knockout stage
3	Argentina	3	1	0	2	3	7	−4	3	Advanced to knockout stage
4	Jamaica	3	0	1	2	2	4	−2	1	

18 June 2011
15:00

France	3–0	Argentina
Benzia 35', 45'; Haller 38'	Report

Estadio Universitario, Monterrey
Attendance: 16,200
Referee: Roberto García (Mexico)

18 June 2011
18:00

Japan	1–0	Jamaica
Matsumoto 61'	Report

Estadio Universitario, Monterrey
Attendance: 8,000
Referee: Néant Alioum (Cameroon)

21 June 2011
15:00

Japan	1–1	France
Ishige 49' (pen.)	Report	Yaisien 24'

Estadio Universitario, Monterrey
Attendance: 4,827
Referee: Víctor Hugo Carrillo (Peru)

21 June 2011
18:00

Jamaica	1–2	Argentina
Barnes 89'	Report	Silva 23'; Pugh 63'

Estadio Universitario, Monterrey
Attendance: 9,150
Referee: Pavel Královec (Czech Republic)

24 June 2011
15:00

Japan	3–1	Argentina
Takagi 4'; Ueda 20'; Akino 74'	Report	Ferreira 87'

Estadio Morelos, Morelia
Attendance: 10,200
Referee: Néant Alioum (Cameroon)

24 June 2011
15:00

Jamaica	1–1	France
Lewis 9'	Report	Benzia 58'

Estadio Universitario, Monterrey
Attendance: 7,566
Referee: Hélder Martins de Carvalho (Angola)

=== Group C ===
Pos	Team	Pld	W	D	L	GF	GA	GD	Pts	Group stage result
1	England	3	2	1	0	6	2	+4	7	Advanced to knockout stage
2	Uruguay	3	2	0	1	4	2	+2	6	Advanced to knockout stage
3	Canada	3	0	2	1	2	5	−3	2	
4	Rwanda	3	0	1	2	0	3	−3	1	

19 June 2011
15:00

Rwanda	0–2	England
	Report	Hope 68'; Sterling 86'

Estadio Hidalgo, Pachuca
Attendance: 12,640
Referee: Norbert Hauata (Tahiti)

19 June 2011
18:00

Uruguay	3–0	Canada
Mascia 52'; Méndez 85' (pen.); Álvarez 90+3'	Report

Estadio Hidalgo, Pachuca
Attendance: 12,699
Referee: Alexey Nikolaev (Russia)

22 June 2011
15:00

Uruguay	1–0	Rwanda
Pais 90+5'	Report

Estadio Hidalgo, Pachuca
Attendance: 12,999
Referee: Svein Oddvar Moen (Norway)

22 June 2011
18:00

Canada	2–2	England
Jalali 50'; Roberts 87'	Report	Morgan 46'; Turgott 77'

Estadio Hidalgo, Pachuca
Attendance: 17,882
Referee: Omar Ponce (Ecuador)
- Roberts' goal for Canada marked the first time a goalkeeper had scored in any FIFA finals tournament.

25 June 2011
15:00

Uruguay	0–2	England
	Report	Chalobah 45'; Clayton 58'

Estadio Corona, Torreón
Attendance: 11,410
Referee: Ali Hamad Al-Badwawi (United Arab Emirates)

25 June 2011
15:00

Canada	0–0	Rwanda
	Report

Estadio Hidalgo, Pachuca
Attendance: 5,803
Referee: Tony Chapron (France)

=== Group D ===
Pos	Team	Pld	W	D	L	GF	GA	GD	Pts	Group stage result
1	Uzbekistan	3	2	0	1	5	6	−1	6	Advanced to knockout stage
2	United States	3	1	1	1	4	2	+2	4	Advanced to knockout stage
3	New Zealand	3	1	1	1	4	2	+2	4	Advanced to knockout stage
4	Czech Republic	3	1	0	2	2	5	−3	3	

Drawing of lots was used to determine the final positions of the United States and New Zealand, as the two teams finished level on points, goal difference, goals scored, and head-to-head record.

19 June 2011
15:00

Uzbekistan	1–4	New Zealand
T. Khakimov 39'	Report	Carmichael 10', 36', 53'; Vale 87'

Estadio Corona, Torreón
Attendance: 7,561
Referee: Hélder Martins de Carvalho (Angola)

19 June 2011
18:00

United States	3–0	Czech Republic
Guido 5'; S. Rodriguez 52'; Koroma 89'	Report

Estadio Corona, Torreón
Attendance: 15,083
Referee: Diego Abal (Argentina)

22 June 2011
15:00

United States	1–2	Uzbekistan
Koroma 47'	Report	Davlatov 13'; Makhstaliev 54' (pen.)

Estadio Corona, Torreón
Attendance: 4,133
Referee: Alexey Nikolaev (Russia)

22 June 2011
18:00

Czech Republic	1–0	New Zealand
Juliš 28'	Report

Estadio Corona, Torreón
Attendance: 10,105
Referee: Roberto García (Mexico)

25 June 2011
18:00

United States	0–0	New Zealand
	Report

Estadio Hidalgo, Pachuca
Attendance: 8,556
Referee: Bas Nijhuis (Netherlands)

25 June 2011
18:00

Czech Republic	1–2	Uzbekistan
Juliš 23' (pen.)	Report	T. Khakimov 44'; Makhstaliev 73'

Estadio Corona, Torreón
Attendance: 14,673
Referee: Raymon Bogle (Jamaica)

=== Group E ===
Pos	Team	Pld	W	D	L	GF	GA	GD	Pts	Group stage result
1	Germany	3	3	0	0	11	1	+10	9	Advanced to knockout stage
2	Ecuador	3	2	0	1	5	7	−2	6	Advanced to knockout stage
3	Panama	3	1	0	2	2	4	−2	3	Advanced to knockout stage
4	Burkina Faso	3	0	0	3	0	6	−6	0	

20 June 2011
15:00

Germany	6–1	Ecuador
Yeşil 31', 69'; Röcker 54'; Ayçiçek 61'; Ducksch 85'; Aydın 90'	Report	Gruezo 51'

Estadio Corregidora, Querétaro
Attendance: 23,500
Referee: Elmer Bonilla (El Salvador)

20 June 2011
18:00

Burkina Faso	0–1	Panama
	Report	Aguilar 22'

Estadio Corregidora, Querétaro
Attendance: 25,167
Referee: Bas Nijhuis (Netherlands)

23 June 2011
15:00

Burkina Faso	0–3	Germany
	Report	Günter 4'; Ayçiçek 26' (pen.); Weiser 64'

Estadio Corregidora, Querétaro
Attendance: 14,603
Referee: Paul Delgadillo (Mexico)

23 June 2011
18:00

Panama	1–2	Ecuador
Aguilar 33'	Report	Jaime 61'; Cevallos 82'

Estadio Corregidora, Querétaro
Attendance: 18,650
Referee: Nawaf Ghayyath Shukralla (Bahrain)

26 June 2011
15:00

Burkina Faso	0–2	Ecuador
	Report	Cevallos 74'; Mercado 76'

Estadio Omnilife, Guadalajara
Attendance: 15,165
Referee: Alexey Nikolaev (Russia)

26 June 2011
15:00

Panama	0–2	Germany
	Report	Aydın 10'; Weiser 39'

Estadio Corregidora, Querétaro
Attendance: 28,500
Referee: Norbert Hauata (Tahiti)

=== Group F ===
Pos	Team	Pld	W	D	L	GF	GA	GD	Pts	Group stage result
1	Brazil	3	2	1	0	7	3	+4	7	Advanced to knockout stage
2	Ivory Coast	3	1	1	1	8	7	+1	4	Advanced to knockout stage
3	Australia	3	1	1	1	3	3	0	4	Advanced to knockout stage
4	Denmark	3	0	1	2	3	8	−5	1	

20 June 2011
15:00

Brazil	3–0	Denmark
Ademilson 32', 78'; Wallace 57'	Report

Estadio Omnilife, Guadalajara
Attendance: 18,845
Referee: Ali Al Badwawi (United Arab Emirates)

20 June 2011
18:00

Australia	2–1	Ivory Coast
Makarounas 51'; Tombides 77'	Report	S. Coulibaly 18'

Estadio Omnilife, Guadalajara
Attendance: 20,728
Referee: Raymond Bogle (Jamaica)

23 June 2011
15:00

Australia	0–1	Brazil
	Report	Adryan 76'

Estadio Omnilife, Guadalajara
Attendance: 21,159
Referee: Stephan Studer (Switzerland)

23 June 2011
18:00

Ivory Coast	4–2	Denmark
S. Coulibaly 23', 37', 41' (pen.), 69'	Report	Zohore 9'; Fischer 32'

Estadio Omnilife, Guadalajara
Attendance: 22,126
Referee: Elmer Bonilla (El Salvador)

26 June 2011
18:00

Ivory Coast	3–3	Brazil
S. Coulibaly 11', 33', 58'	Report	Piazon 8'; Ademilson 14'; Adryan 90+3'

Estadio Omnilife, Guadalajara
Attendance: 24,943
Referee: Roberto García (Mexico)

27 June 2011
10:00

Australia	1–1	Denmark
Remington 89'	Report	Sørensen 35'

Estadio Corregidora, Querétaro
Attendance: 2,000
Referee: Diego Abal (Argentina)
- The game was originally played on 26 June 2011 (kickoff 18:00), but was suspended after 25 minutes due to heavy downpour and lightning (with Denmark leading 1–0 on an 11th-minute goal by Viktor Fischer). Following an hour and a half delay in which the conditions did not improve, the Organising Committee for the FIFA U-17 World Cup decided to abandon the match and replay it in its entirety (starting from 0–0) the next day, 27 June 2011 (kickoff 10:00), at the same venue, Estadio Corregidora in Querétaro.

=== Ranking of third-placed teams ===
Pos	Grp	Team	Pld	W	D	L	GF	GA	GD	Pts	Group stage result
1	D	New Zealand	3	1	1	1	4	2	+2	4	Advanced to knockout stage
2	F	Australia	3	1	1	1	3	3	0	4	Advanced to knockout stage
3	E	Panama	3	1	0	2	2	4	−2	3	Advanced to knockout stage
4	B	Argentina	3	1	0	2	3	7	−4	3	Advanced to knockout stage
5	A	North Korea	3	0	2	1	3	5	−2	2	
6	C	Canada	3	0	2	1	2	5	−3	2	

== Knockout stage ==
In a rule to avoid potential "player burnout", all games in the knockout stage proceeded straight to penalties if tied after normal time, thus avoiding the need for 30 minutes of extra time.

Round of 16
29 June 2011 – Morelia
Congo	1
Uruguay	2
29 June 2011 – Torreón
Uzbekistan	4
Australia	0
29 June 2011 – Monterrey
Japan	6
New Zealand	0
29 June 2011 – Guadalajara
Brazil	2
Ecuador	0
30 June 2011 – Querétaro
Germany	4
United States	0
30 June 2011 – Pachuca
England (pen.)	1 (4)
Argentina	1 (2)
30 June 2011 – Querétaro
France	3
Ivory Coast	2
30 June 2011 – Pachuca
Mexico	2
Panama	0

Quarter-finals
3 July 2011 – Monterrey
Uruguay	2
Uzbekistan	0
3 July 2011 – Querétaro
Japan	2
Brazil	3
4 July 2011 – Morelia
Germany	3
England	2
4 July 2011 – Pachuca
France	1
Mexico	2

Semi-finals
7 July 2011 – Guadalajara
Uruguay	3
Brazil	0
7 July 2011 – Torreón
Germany	2
Mexico	3

Final
10 July 2011 – Mexico City
Uruguay	0
Mexico	2
Third place
10 July 2011 – Mexico City
Brazil	3
Germany	4

=== Round of 16 ===
29 June 2011
15:00

Uzbekistan	4–0	Australia
Makhstaliev 11'; T. Khakimov 40'; Chapman 66' (o.g.); Yarbekov 89'	Report

Estadio Corona, Torreón
Attendance: 8,340
Referee: Víctor Hugo Carrillo (Peru)

29 June 2011
15:00

Brazil	2–0	Ecuador
Ademilson 16'; Bonatini 87'	Report

Estadio Omnilife, Guadalajara
Attendance: 19,335
Referee: Pavel Kralovec (Czech Republic)

29 June 2011
18:00

Congo	1–2	Uruguay
Binguila 53'	Report	Moreira 65'; Silva 86'

Estadio Morelos, Morelia
Attendance: 12,350
Referee: Raymon Bogle (Jamaica)

29 June 2011
18:00

Japan	6–0	New Zealand
Ishige 20', 22'; Hayakawa 32', 80'; Colvey 42' (o.g.); Minamino 56'	Report

Estadio Universitario, Monterrey
Attendance: 7,930
Referee: Stephan Studer (Switzerland)

30 June 2011
15:00

Germany	4–0	United States
Günter 20'; Weiser 40'; Yeşil 43'; Ducksch 50'	Report

Estadio Corregidora, Querétaro
Attendance: 16,191
Referee: Omar Ponce (Ecuador)

30 June 2011
15:00

England	1–1	Argentina
Sterling 40'	Report	Padilla 12'
Penalties
Magri (penalty scored); Morgan (penalty scored); Clayton (penalty missed); Forster-Caskey (penalty scored); Chalobah (penalty scored)	4–2	(penalty scored) Ocampos; (penalty scored) Pugh; (penalty missed) Iñíguez; (penalty missed) Allione

Estadio Hidalgo, Pachuca
Attendance: 6,807
Referee: Nawaf Shukralla (Bahrain)

30 June 2011
18:00

France	3–2	Ivory Coast
Benzia 37' (pen.), 74'; Nangis 65'	Report	S. Coulibaly 3'; Diarrassouba 25'

Estadio Corregidora, Querétaro
Attendance: 18,192
Referee: Elmer Bonilla (El Salvador)

30 June 2011
18:00

Mexico	2–0	Panama
Fierro 2'; Bueno 89'	Report

Estadio Hidalgo, Pachuca
Attendance: 15,415
Referee: Svein Oddvar Moen (Norway)

=== Quarter-finals ===
3 July 2011
15:00

Uruguay	2–0	Uzbekistan
Charamoni 29'; Aguirre 64'	Report

Estadio Universitario, Monterrey
Attendance: 11,015
Referee: Néant Alioum (Cameroon)

3 July 2011
18:00

Japan	2–3	Brazil
Nakajima 77'; Hayakawa 88'	Report	Bonatini 16'; Ademilson 48'; Adryan 60'

Estadio Corregidora, Querétaro
Attendance: 30,123
Referee: Roberto García (Mexico)

4 July 2011
15:00

Germany	3–2	England
Yeşil 7', 53'; Ayhan 24'	Report	Magri 67' (pen.); Hope 83'

Estadio Morelos, Morelia
Attendance: 16,020
Referee: Pavel Královec (Czech Republic)

4 July 2011
18:00

France	1–2	Mexico
Ikoko 17'	Report	Escamilla 14'; Fierro 50'

Estadio Hidalgo, Pachuca
Attendance: 21,960
Referee: Ali Al Badwawi (United Arab Emirates)

=== Semi-finals ===
7 July 2011
15:00

Uruguay	3–0	Brazil
Álvarez 20' (pen.); San Martín 72'; Méndez 90+5'	Report

Estadio Omnilife, Guadalajara
Attendance: 29,315
Referee: Alexey Nikolaev (Russia)

7 July 2011
18:00

Germany	2–3	Mexico
Yeşil 10'; Can 60'	Report	Gómez 3', 90'; Espericueta 76'

Estadio Corona, Torreón
Attendance: 26,086
Referee: Omar Ponce (Ecuador)

=== Third-place match ===
10 July 2011
15:00

Brazil	3–4	Germany
Wellington 22'; Adryan 29' (pen.), 33'	Report	Aydın 20', 63'; Günter 45+1'; Ayçiçek 55'

Estadio Azteca, Mexico City
Attendance: 94,379
Referee: Roberto García (Mexico)

=== Final ===
10 July 2011
18:00

Uruguay	0–2	Mexico
	Report	Briseño 31'; Casillas 90+2'

Estadio Azteca, Mexico City
Attendance: 98,943
Referee: Svein Oddvar Moen (Norway)

== Awards ==
=== Winners ===
2011 FIFA U-17 World Cup Winners

Mexico
2nd title

=== Individual awards ===
Golden Ball	Silver Ball	Bronze Ball
(Mexico) Julio Gómez	(Mexico) Jonathan Espericueta	(Mexico) Carlos Fierro
Golden Shoe	Silver Shoe	Bronze Shoe
(Ivory Coast) Souleymane Coulibaly	(Germany) Samed Yeşil	(Brazil) Adryan
9 goals	6 goals	5 goals
Golden Glove
(Uruguay) Mathías Cubero
FIFA Fair Play Award
Japan

== Team statistics ==
Pos	Team	Pld	W	D	L	GF	GA	GD	Pts	Final result
1	Mexico (H)	7	7	0	0	17	7	+10	21	Champions
2	Uruguay	7	5	0	2	11	5	+6	15	Runners-up
3	Germany	7	6	0	1	24	9	+15	18	Third place
4	Brazil	7	4	1	2	15	12	+3	13	Fourth place
5	Japan	5	3	1	1	13	5	+8	10	Eliminated in Quarter-finals
6	Uzbekistan	5	3	0	2	9	8	+1	9	Eliminated in Quarter-finals
7	England	5	2	2	1	9	6	+3	8	Eliminated in Quarter-finals
7	France	5	2	2	1	9	6	+3	8	Eliminated in Quarter-finals
9	Ecuador	4	2	0	2	5	9	−4	6	Eliminated in Round of 16
10	Ivory Coast	4	1	1	2	10	10	0	4	Eliminated in Round of 16
11	Congo	4	1	1	2	4	5	−1	4	Eliminated in Round of 16
12	United States	4	1	1	2	4	6	−2	4	Eliminated in Round of 16
13	Argentina	4	1	1	2	4	8	−4	4	Eliminated in Round of 16
13	New Zealand	4	1	1	2	4	8	−4	4	Eliminated in Round of 16
15	Australia	4	1	1	2	3	7	−4	4	Eliminated in Round of 16
16	Panama	4	1	0	3	2	6	−4	3	Eliminated in Round of 16
17	Czech Republic	3	1	0	2	2	5	−3	3	Eliminated in Group stage
18	North Korea	3	0	2	1	3	5	−2	2	Eliminated in Group stage
19	Canada	3	0	2	1	2	5	−3	2	Eliminated in Group stage
20	Netherlands	3	0	1	2	3	5	−2	1	Eliminated in Group stage
21	Jamaica	3	0	1	2	2	4	−2	1	Eliminated in Group stage
22	Rwanda	3	0	1	2	0	3	−3	1	Eliminated in Group stage
23	Denmark	3	0	1	2	3	8	−5	1	Eliminated in Group stage
24	Burkina Faso	3	0	0	3	0	6	−6	0	Eliminated in Group stage

(H) Hosts

== Goalscorers ==
9 goals

- (Ivory Coast) Souleymane Coulibaly

6 goals

- (Germany) Samed Yeşil

5 goals

- (Brazil) Ademilson
- (Brazil) Adryan
- (France) Yassine Benzia

4 goals

- (Germany) Okan Aydın
- (Mexico) Carlos Fierro

3 goals

- (Germany) Levent Ayçiçek
- (Germany) Koray Günter
- (Germany) Mitchell Weiser
- (Japan) Fumiya Hayakawa
- (Japan) Hideki Ishige
- (Mexico) Giovani Casillas
- (Mexico) Julio Gómez
- (New Zealand) Stephen Carmichael
- (Uzbekistan) Timur Khakimov
- (Uzbekistan) Abbosbek Makhstaliev

2 goals

- (Brazil) Léo Bonatini
- (Czech Republic) Lukáš Juliš
- (Ecuador) José Cevallos
- (England) Hallam Hope
- (England) Raheem Sterling
- (Germany) Marvin Ducksch
- (Mexico) Jonathan Espericueta
- (Panama) Jorman Aguilar
- (Uruguay) Elbio Álvarez
- (Uruguay) Guillermo Méndez
- (United States) Alfred Koroma

1 goal

- (Argentina) Brian Ferreira
- (Argentina) Maximiliano Padilla
- (Argentina) Lucas Pugh
- (Argentina) Jonathan Silva
- (Australia) Jesse Makarounas
- (Australia) Luke Remington
- (Australia) Dylan Tombides
- (Brazil) Lucas Piazon
- (Brazil) Wallace
- (Brazil) Wellington
- (Canada) Sadi Jalali
- (Canada) Quillan Roberts
- (Republic of the Congo) Hardy Binguila
- (Republic of the Congo) Bel-Ange Epako
- (Republic of the Congo) Moïse Nkounkou
- (Republic of the Congo) Christ Nkounkou
- (Ivory Coast) Drissa Diarrassouba
- (Denmark) Viktor Fischer
- (Denmark) Lee Rochester Sørensen
- (Denmark) Kenneth Zohore
- (Ecuador) Carlos Gruezo
- (Ecuador) Jordan Jaime
- (Ecuador) Kevin Mercado
- (England) Nathaniel Chalobah
- (England) Max Clayton
- (England) Sam Magri
- (England) Adam Morgan
- (England) Blair Turgott
- (France) Sébastien Haller
- (France) Jordan Ikoko
- (France) Lenny Nangis
- (France) Abdallah Yaisien
- (Germany) Kaan Ayhan
- (Germany) Emre Can
- (Germany) Cimo Röcker
- (Jamaica) Zhelano Barnes
- (Jamaica) Andre Lewis
- (Japan) Hiroki Akino
- (Japan) Masaya Matsumoto
- (Japan) Takumi Minamino
- (Japan) Shoya Nakajima
- (Japan) Daisuke Takagi
- (Japan) Naomichi Ueda
- (Mexico) Antonio Briseño
- (Mexico) Marco Bueno
- (Mexico) Kevin Escamilla
- (Mexico) Alfonso González
- (Netherlands) Memphis Depay
- (Netherlands) Kyle Ebecilio
- (Netherlands) Danzell Gravenberch
- (New Zealand) Jordan Vale
- (North Korea) Jo Kwang
- (North Korea) Ju Jong-Chol
- (North Korea) Kang Nam-Gwon
- (United States) Alejandro Guido
- (United States) Stevie Rodriguez
- (Uruguay) Rodrigo Aguirre
- (Uruguay) Santiago Charamoni
- (Uruguay) Juan Cruz Mascia
- (Uruguay) Maximiliano Moreira
- (Uruguay) Leonardo Pais
- (Uruguay) Juan San Martín
- (Uruguay) Gastón Silva
- (Uzbekistan) Bobir Davlatov
- (Uzbekistan) Davlatbek Yarbekov

1 own goal

- (Australia) Connor Chapman (against Uzbekistan)
- (New Zealand) Kip Colvey (against Japan)
- (North Korea) Jong Kwang-Sok (against Mexico)
