= Cidinho =

Cidinho may refer to:

- Cidinho and Doca, Brazilian rap duo
- Cidinho (footballer), Brazilian footballer
