= Mathías Abero =

Uruguayan footballer (born 1990)

Personal information
- Full name: Mathías Nicolás Abero Villan
- Date of birth: 9 April 1990 (age 36)
- Place of birth: Montevideo, Uruguay
- Height: 1.84 m (6 ft 0 in)
- Position: Left-back

Team information
- Current team: Cerro
- Number: 16

Youth career
- 2005–2009: Nacional

Senior career*
Years	Team	Apps	(Gls)
2008–2012	Nacional	18	(3)
2010–2011	→ Racing Montevideo (loan)	31	(1)
2012–2015	Bologna	21	(1)
2013–2014	→ Avellino (loan)	2	(0)
2015–2016	Nacional	8	(1)
2016–2017	Atlético de Rafaela	36	(2)
2017–2018	Tigre	11	(0)
2018–2019	Atlético Tucumán	19	(1)
2019–2020	Patronato	14	(0)
2020–2021	Rentistas	30	(1)
2021	Montevideo Wanderers	22	(2)
2022–	Rentistas	4	(0)

International career
2007	Uruguay U17	3	(0)
2011	Uruguay U22	5	(2)
2012	Uruguay U23	1	(0)
- * Club domestic league appearances and goals as of 20:18, 17 April 2022 (UTC)

Mathías Nicolás Abero Villan (born 9 April 1990) is a Uruguayan professional footballer who plays as a left-back for Uruguayan Primera División club Cerro.

== Club career ==
=== Nacional ===
Born in Montevideo, Abero began his career as a youth player for Nacional. He made his first-team debut on 13 June 2009 in a 3–0 league loss to Central Español. This was his only appearance in 2008–09 season. Nacional eventually won the league.

In July he made three league appearances for Nacional and in January he was loaned to Racing Montevideo. He made his debut for Racing on 20 February in a 3–0 league loss to Cerrito. He ended the 2009–10 with six league appearances for Racing. In the next season Abero made 25 appearances and scored one goal (on 7 May 2011) in a 6–0 win over Danubio.

In June 2011 Abero returned to Nacional. On 9 October in a 3–0 win over Rentistas he scored his first goal for Nacional. Abero ended the 2011–12 with 17 appearances and three goals. He also won his second league title with Nacional.

=== Bologna ===
On 19 July 2012, he signed with a Serie A side Bologna.

== International career ==
Abero was part of the Uruguay U-17 squad that participated in the 2007 South American Under-17 Football Championship

In 2011, he was called by Juan Verzeri to participate in the Uruguay U-22 squad for the 2011 Pan American Games. In this tournament he scored twice, one goal against Trinidad and Tobago and one against the Mexican selection.

On 25 April 2012, he played an international match for Uruguay U-23 against Egypt U-23 in Paysandú.

Abero is also eligible to play for Italy because he has an Italian passport and because of his Italian ancestry.

== Honours ==
Nacional

- Uruguayan Primera División: 2008–09, 2011–12
