= Guillermo Méndez (footballer, born 1994) =

Uruguayan footballer

Personal information
- Full name: Guillermo Andrés Méndez Aguilera
- Date of birth: 26 August 1994 (age 32)
- Place of birth: Paysandú, Uruguay
- Height: 1.80 m (5 ft 11 in)
- Position: Attacking midfielder

Youth career
- Nacional

Senior career*
Years	Team	Apps	(Gls)
2012–2014	Standard Liège	0	(0)
2013	→ Sint-Truiden (loan)	19	(3)
2014	→ Alcorcón (loan)	1	(0)
2014–2017	Bella Vista		
2017–2019	Unión Santa Fe	11	(0)
2018–2019	→ Unión de Sunchales (loan)	11	(0)
2020	Huracán		
2021–2022	La Luz		
2022	Club Oriental		
2023–2024	Rentistas	8	(1)

International career
2011	Uruguay U17	16	(2)
- * Club domestic league appearances and goals as of 19 January 2024

Guillermo Andrés Méndez Aguilera (born 26 August 1994) is a Uruguayan footballer.
