= Omar Ponce =

Ecuadorian football referee

- Full name: Omar Andres Ponce Manzo
- Born: 25 January 1977 (age 49); Ecuador

Domestic
| Years | League | Role |

International
| Years | League | Role |
| 2009- | FIFA listed | Referee |

Omar Andres Ponce Manzo (born 25 January 1977) is an Ecuadorian football referee.

Ponce became a FIFA referee in 2009. He has served as a referee for the 2011 FIFA U-17 World Cup and 2014 FIFA World Cup qualifiers.
