= Miguel Ángel Ponce =

Mexican footballer (born 1989)

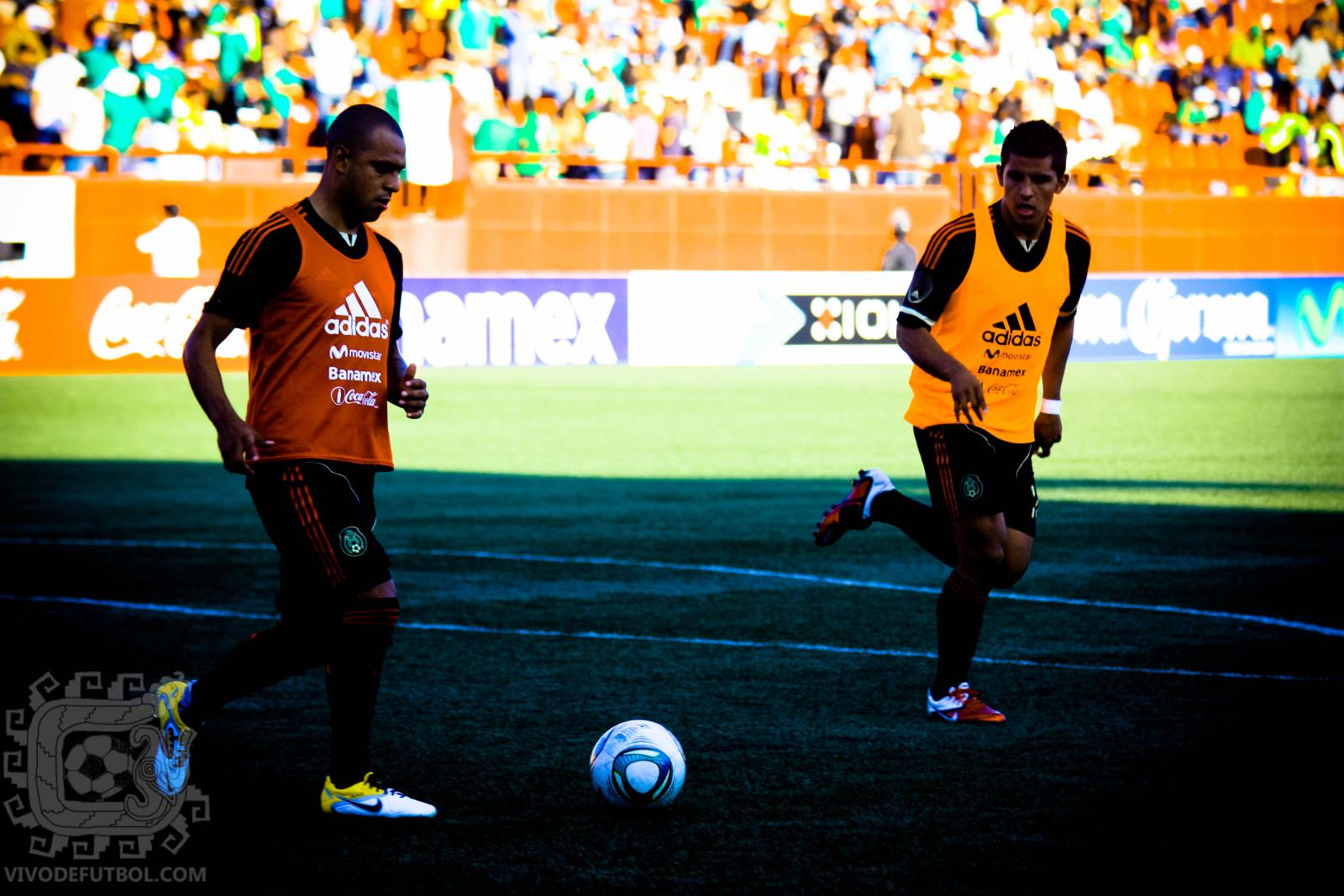
- Ponce (right) with Mexico

Personal information
- Full name: Miguel Ángel Ponce Briseño
- Date of birth: 12 April 1989 (age 37)
- Place of birth: Sacramento, California, United States
- Height: 1.76 m (5 ft 9 in)
- Position: Left-back

Youth career
- 2004–2010: Guadalajara

Senior career*
Years	Team	Apps	(Gls)
2008	Tapatío	1	(0)
2010–2022	Guadalajara	242	(8)
2014	→ Toluca (Loan)	38	(3)
2017–2018	→ Necaxa (Loan)	29	(0)
Total		310	(11)

International career
2011–2012	Mexico U23	22	(5)
2011–2014	Mexico	12	(1)
Medal record
Men's football
Representing Mexico
Olympic Games
Gold medal – first place	2012 London	Team
Olympic Qualifying Championship
Winner	2012 United States
Toulon Tournament
Winner	2012 France	Team
Pan American Games
Gold medal – first place	2011 Guadalajara	Team
- * Club domestic league appearances and goals as of 4 January 2024

Miguel Ángel Ponce Briseño (born 12 April 1989), also known as Pocho, is a Mexican former professional footballer who played as a left-back. Born in the United States, he played for the Mexico national team. He is an Olympic gold medalist.

== Early life ==
Ponce moved with his family from Sacramento to Guadalajara before he was 1, then to Tijuana when he was 10 to enable visits from his father, who worked building bridges in California. Wanting his son to learn English, his father arranged for him to use a friend's address in San Ysidro, San Diego as a base to attend US schools. He played association football for four years at San Ysidro Middle School and San Ysidro High School before being invited to a tryout by C.D. Guadalajara at age 15.

== Club career ==
=== Guadalajara ===
Ponce scored his first goal for Chivas on September 28, 2010, in the 71st minute of the game against Tigres UANL rescuing the team from a loss of the game with a 1-1 end. He scored once again on October 3, 2010, against local rival Atlas. Ponce ended the 2010–2011 season with two goals in 30 games.

==== Toluca ====
Ponce quickly established himself as the starting left-back in José Cardozo's starting eleven. Despite having a successful year with Toluca, the club announced they were not going to accept the purchase option included in the loan agreement.

==== Necaxa ====
On June 7, 2017, Ponce was sent out on loan to Necaxa.

=== Deportivo Rose City ===
Ponce signed with United Premier Soccer League club Deportivo Rose City on June 12, 2024,].

== International career ==
=== Youth ===
In 2011, Ponce was selected to participate in the 2011 Pan American Games, Mexico won gold after defeating Argentina in the final. in 2012 Ponce participated in the 2012 Olympic Qualifying Tournament and scored twice in the tournament. Ponce participated in the 2012 Toulon Tournament and helped Mexico win the final against Turkey. Miguel Ponce made the final cut for those participating in the 2012 Summer Olympics, Miguel Ponce played 4 matches in the 2012 Olympics including the 2–1 win over Brazil in the gold medal match at Wembley Stadium.

=== Senior ===
Ponce was part of the preliminary list of players that would participate in the Copa America in Argentina. Later, he also appeared in the definitive list for those participating in the tournament. He made his senior national team debut with Mexico at the 2011 Copa América July 8, 2011 against Perú entering as a substitute for Dárvin Chávez in the 73' minute of the game. However Mexico used a youth team in the tournament and participation by Mexico, as non conference member of CONMEBOL and guest invitee, were deemed friendly matches for Mexico. Miguel Ponce made his first competitive appearance for Mexico with the senior squad in a 2013 CONCACAF Gold Cup match against Canada that also, given his dual US-Mexican citizenship, cap-tied him to Mexico.

== Career statistics ==
=== International ===
As of match played 18 November 2014

National team	Year	Apps	Goals
Mexico	2011	2	0
Mexico	2013	2	1
Mexico	2014	8	0
Total		12	1

=== International goals ===
Scores and results list Mexico's goal tally first.

Goal	Date	Venue	Opponent	Score	Result	Competition
1.	July 14, 2013	Sports Authority Field at Mile High, Denver, United States	Martinique	3–1	3–1	2013 CONCACAF Gold Cup

== Honours ==
Guadalajara

- Liga MX: Clausura 2017
- Copa MX: Apertura 2015, Clausura 2017
- Supercopa MX: 2016

Necaxa

- Copa MX: Clausura 2018

Mexico U23

- Pan American Games: 2011
- CONCACAF Olympic Qualifying Championship: 2012
- Toulon Tournament: 2012
- Olympic Gold Medal: 2012
