= César Ibáñez (footballer, born 1992) =

Mexican footballer

Personal information
- Full name: César Alberto Ibáñez Jiménez
- Date of birth: 1 April 1992 (age 34)
- Place of birth: Guadalajara, Jalisco, Mexico
- Height: 1.71 m (5 ft 7 1/2 in)
- Position: Full-back

Senior career*
Years	Team	Apps	(Gls)
2008–2011	Atlas	5	(1)
2011–2015	→ Santos Laguna (loan)	57	(1)
2015–2017	Santos Laguna	10	(1)
2017	→ Atlético San Luis (loan)	4	(0)
2018	→ Correcaminos UAT (loan)	3	(0)
2019–2020	CAFESSA Jalisco	18	(0)
2020	Atlético Jalisco	0	(0)
2021	Irapuato	10	(0)

International career
2009	Mexico U17	4	(0)
2011	Mexico U20	11	(0)
2012	Mexico U23	8	(0)
Medal record
Men's football
Representing Mexico
Pan American Games
Gold medal – first place	2011 Guadalajara	Team
Toulon Tournament
Winner	2012 France	Team
FIFA U-20 World Cup
Third place	2011 Colombia	Team
CONCACAF U-20 Championship
Winner	2011 Guatemala
CONCACAF U-17 Championship
Winner	2009 Mexico
- * Club domestic league appearances and goals as of 16 January 2021

César Alberto Ibáñez Jiménez (born 1 April 1992) is a former Mexican professional footballer who last played for C.D. Irapuato in the Liga Premier de México.

== Club career ==
On 8 November 2008 César made his 1st division debut at the age of 16 in a 2–1 win over Monarcas Morelia. Oddly, he had only played one game in the 2nd Division of Mexican football. On 29 April 2010 scouts from Spanish team Real Valladolid wanted him to join the club's B team. Ibáñez declined the offer for a move to Spain, choosing to stay with Atlas. on Apertura 2011 he will play with the Mexican club Santos Laguna on loan.

== International career ==
He has been called up to the Mexico U-17 team . César was a starter on the Mexico U-17 team that beat the Brazil U-17 team at the 2009 FIFA U-17 World Cup.

== Honours ==
Santos Laguna

- Liga MX: Clausura 2012, Clausura 2015
- Copa MX: Apertura 2014
- Campeón de Campeones: 2015

Mexico Youth

- CONCACAF U-20 Championship: 2011
- Pan American Games: 2011
- Toulon Tournament: 2012
