= Cidinho (footballer) =

Brazilian footballer (born 1993)

Personal information
- Full name: Alcides de Souza Faria Júnior
- Date of birth: 28 January 1993 (age 33)
- Place of birth: Rio de Janeiro, Brazil
- Height: 1.69 m (5 ft 7 in)
- Position: Midfielder

Youth career
- 2001–2011: Botafogo

Senior career*
Years	Team	Apps	(Gls)
2011–2016	Botafogo	41	(6)
2016	Sepahan	0	(0)
2017–2019	Béziers	15	(4)
2020	Uthai Thani		

International career
2010–2012	Brazil U20	19	(3)
2011	Brazil U23	2	(0)
- * Club domestic league appearances and goals as of 02:47, 22 February 2020 (UTC)

Alcides de Souza Faria Júnior, or simply Cidinho (born 28 January 1993) is a Brazilian professional footballer who plays as a midfielder.

He was a member of Brazil national under-23 football team in Pan American Games on 2011.

== Club career ==
Born in Rio de Janeiro, Cidinho started his youth football career in 2001 where he joined Botafogo. He played in all age-levels in Botafogo until 2011.

On 2011 he could play for Botafogo in Campeonato Brasileiro Série A. He played 28 matches in Série A and scored 4 goals. Moreover, from 2013 to 2015 he played for Botafogo in Campeonato Carioca and Copa do Brasil.

In the international level, Cidinho also got a chance to play for Botafogo in Copa Sudamericana in 2012 and Copa Libertadores in 2014.

In 2017, he joined French club AS Béziers. He left Béziers in the summer 2019. At the end of December 2019, Cidinho signed with Thai League 2 club, Air Force United, who was renamed Uthai Thani for the 2020 season. However, after difficulties adapting, he left the club after three months and returned to France.

== International career ==
On 2010 and from Botafogo U20 he could reach Brazil national under-20 football team. He played 19 matches for the Brazil U20 national team and scored 3 goals from 2010 to 2012.

On 2011 and after strong performance in Campeonato Brasileiro Série A with Botafogo, he invited to Brazil national under-23 football team for competing in 2011 Pan American Games held in Guadalajara, Mexico.

In the competition, he played two matches for Brazil U23 national team against Argentina and Costa Rica.

== Honours ==
Botafogo

- Campeonato Brasileiro Série A fourth place: 2013
- Campeonato Brasileiro Série B: 2015
- Campeonato Carioca: 2013, runners-up: 2012, 2015, 2016
