= Juan Verzeri =

Uruguayan football coach (born 1963)

Personal information
- Full name: Juan José Verzeri Casas
- Date of birth: 20 May 1963 (age 63)
- Place of birth: Montevideo, Uruguay

Team information
- Current team: Peñarol (assistant)

Managerial career
- Years: Team
- 2002: River Plate Montevideo (youth)
- 2004: Liverpool Montevideo (youth)
- 2005–2007: Juventud (assistant)
- 2008: Oman (assistant)
- 2008–2010: Racing Montevideo
- 2010–2013: Uruguay U20
- 2011: Uruguay U22
- 2014: Al-Ittihad
- 2015: Liverpool Montevideo
- 2016: Atlético Mineiro (assistant)
- 2016–2017: San Lorenzo (assistant)
- 2018: São Paulo (assistant)
- 2019–2020: Al-Rayyan (assistant)
- 2021: Internacional (assistant)
- 2022: Cruz Azul (assistant)
- 2023: Olimpia (assistant)
- 2023: Santos (assistant)
- 2023–: Peñarol (assistant)
Medal record
Representing Uruguay
Men's Football
Pan American Games
Bronze medal – third place	2011 Guadalajara	Team competition

Juan José Verzeri Casas (born 20 May 1963) is a Uruguayan football coach, who is currently assistant manager of Peñarol. He is nicknamed "Ingeniero" (Engineer), for his secondary profession.

== Coaching career ==
Verzeri was born in Montevideo. In early 2008, he became assistant manager of Julio César Ribas at Oman for a short period of time.

In mid-2008, Verzeri took up coaching at Racing Club de Montevideo in the Uruguayan Primera División. He played a vital role for Racing to qualify to the 2010 Copa Libertadores.

In May 2010, Verzeri was named the Uruguay under-20s manager. On 11 August of that year, he was in charge of the senior team on a friendly match against Angola.

In 2011, Verzeri coached the Uruguay U22 team for the 2011 Pan American Games. After leaving the national side in 2013, he was manager of Ittihad FC and Liverpool Montevideo before joining Diego Aguirre's staff at Atlético Mineiro.

Verzeri followed Aguirre in the following years, being his assistant at San Lorenzo, São Paulo, Al-Rayyan, Internacional, Cruz Azul, Olimpia, Santos and Peñarol.

== Honours ==
Uruguay U20

- FIFA U-20 World Cup: 2013 runner-up
- South American U-20 Championship: 2011 runner-up
