= Gonzalo Papa =

Uruguayan footballer (born 1989)

Personal information
- Full name: Gonzalo Sebastián Papa Palleiro
- Date of birth: 8 May 1989 (age 37)
- Place of birth: Montevideo, Uruguay
- Height: 1.74 m (5 ft 9 in)
- Position: Defensive midfielder

Team information
- Current team: Güemes

Senior career*
Years	Team	Apps	(Gls)
2009–2016	Fénix	153	(3)
2016–2017	Arsenal de Sarandí	23	(0)
2017–2018	Villa Dálmine	23	(1)
2018–2019	Agropecuario	22	(0)
2020	Ayacucho	25	(1)
2021–2022	Albion	36	(1)
2023	Flandria	24	(0)
2024–	Güemes	44	(2)

International career^{‡}
2011	Uruguay U-22	4	(0)
- * Club domestic league appearances and goals as of 17:05, 13 August 2025 (UTC) ‡ National team caps and goals as of 20:28, 18 November 2017 (UTC)

Gonzalo Sebastián Papa Palleiro (born 8 May 1989), commonly known as Gonzalo Papa, is a Uruguayan professional footballer who plays as a defensive midfielder for Primera Nacional club Güemes.

== Club career ==
Papa started his career playing with Centro Atlético Fénix in 2009. He made his debut on 22 August 2009 against River Plate.

== International career ==
=== Under-22 ===
In 2011, he was named to participate in the Uruguay national football team under-22 squad for the 2011 Pan American Games.
