= Emiliano Albín =

Uruguayan footballer (born 1989)

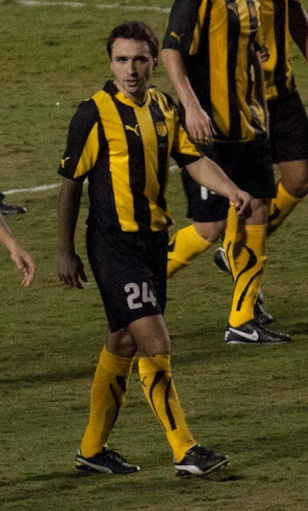

Personal information
- Full name: Emiliano Albín Antognazza
- Date of birth: 24 January 1989 (age 37)
- Place of birth: Sauce, Uruguay
- Height: 1.76 m (5 ft 9 1/2 in)
- Position: Right back

Team information
- Current team: Villa Española
- Number: 24

Youth career
- –2009: Peñarol

Senior career*
Years	Team	Apps	(Gls)
2009–2015	Peñarol	86	(1)
2012–2013	→ Boca Juniors (loan)	17	(0)
2016	Arouca	7	(0)
2017–2018	Juventud	27	(0)
2018	San Martín Tucumán	11	(0)
2019	Deportivo Santaní	4	(0)
2020–	Villa Española	18	(2)

International career
2012	Uruguay Olympic	2	(0)
- * Club domestic league appearances and goals

Emiliano Albín Antognazza (born 24 January 1989) is a Uruguayan professional footballer who plays for Villa Española.

He played for the Uruguay Olympic football team, and competed at both the 2011 Guadalajara Pan American Games and the 2012 London Olympics.

== Club career ==
Emiliano debuted in 2009 for Peñarol against Montevideo Wanderers.

In 2012, he was loaned to Boca Juniors. He made his debut in Boca against Independiente on 22 August for the Copa Sudamericana, and then he played next Saturday against Unión for the local league.
