= Leonardo Ferreyra =

Argentine footballer

Personal information
- Full name: Leonardo Martín Ferreyra
- Date of birth: 21 October 1991 (age 35)
- Place of birth: San Salvador de Jujuy, Argentina
- Height: 1.74 m (5 ft 9 in)
- Position: Right-back

Team information
- Current team: Almagro
- Number: 4

Youth career
- –2009: Gimnasia y Esgrima

Senior career*
Years	Team	Apps	(Gls)
2009–2020	Gimnasia Jujuy	208	(8)
2013–2014	→ Olimpo (loan)	18	(0)
2020–2021	Instituto	37	(3)
2022–	Almagro	15	(0)

International career
2011	Argentina U20	5	(0)
- * Club domestic league appearances and goals as of 19:34, 7 June 2022 (UTC)

Leonardo Martín Ferreyra (born 21 October 1991) is an Argentine professional footballer who plays as a right-back for Almagro.

== Club career ==
Ferreyra began his senior career in 2009 with Primera B Nacional's Gimnasia y Esgrima. His professional debut arrived on 29 October during a goalless draw away to All Boys, which preceded the defender scoring his opening goal against Aldosivi on 6 February 2010. Over the course of his first four seasons, he participated in seventy-six matches and scored four times. On 30 June 2013, Ferreyra joined Primera División side Olimpo on a season-long loan deal. Eighteen appearances followed. He returned to Gimnasia ahead of the 2014, going on to take his tally to two hundred and fourteen appearances and eight goals.

In August 2020, after eleven senior years at Gimnasia, Ferreyra departed to sign for fellow Primera B Nacional team Instituto. In December 2021, Ferreyra signed a deal with Club Almagro.

== International career ==
In 2011, Ferreyra was selected by the Argentina U20s for the Pan American Games. He won five caps at the tournament as they reached the final, where they lost to hosts Mexico U23s.

== Career statistics ==
As of 28 September 2020.

Club statistics
Club	Season	League			Cup		Continental		Other		Total	
Club	Season	Division	Apps	Goals	Apps	Goals	Apps	Goals	Apps	Goals	Apps	Goals
Gimnasia y Esgrima	2009–10	Primera B Nacional	9	1	0	0	—		0	0	9	1
Gimnasia y Esgrima	2010–11	Primera B Nacional	7	0	0	0	—		0	0	7	0
Gimnasia y Esgrima	2011–12	Primera B Nacional	30	3	1	0	—		0	0	31	3
Gimnasia y Esgrima	2012–13	Primera B Nacional	28	0	1	0	—		0	0	29	0
Gimnasia y Esgrima	2013–14	Primera B Nacional	0	0	0	0	—		0	0	0	0
Gimnasia y Esgrima	2014	Primera B Nacional	1	0	0	0	—		2 (Note: Appearance(s) in the Primera B Nacional play-offs)	0	3	0
Gimnasia y Esgrima	2015	Primera B Nacional	25	3	0	0	—		0	0	28	3
Gimnasia y Esgrima	2016	Primera B Nacional	20	0	1	0	—		0	0	21	0
Gimnasia y Esgrima	2016–17	Primera B Nacional	28	0	0	0	—		0	0	28	0
Gimnasia y Esgrima	2017–18	Primera B Nacional	23	0	0	0	—		0	0	23	0
Gimnasia y Esgrima	2018–19	Primera B Nacional	22	1	1	0	—		0	0	23	1
Gimnasia y Esgrima	2019–20	Primera B Nacional	15	0	0	0	—		0	0	15	0
Gimnasia y Esgrima	Total		208	8	4	0	—		2	0	214	8
Olimpo (loan)	2013–14	Primera División	18	0	0	0	—		0	0	18	0
Instituto	2020–21	Primera B Nacional	0	0	0	0	—		0	0	0	0
Career total			226	8	4	0	—		2	0	232	8
