= Carlos Orrantia =

Mexican footballer (born 1991)

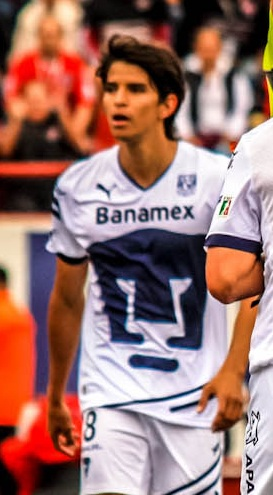
- Orrantia playing for UNAM

Personal information
- Full name: Carlos Emilio Orrantia Treviño
- Date of birth: 1 February 1991 (age 35)
- Place of birth: Mexico City, Mexico
- Height: 1.76 m (5 ft 9 1/2 in)
- Position: Right-back

Youth career
- 2008–2010: UNAM

Senior career*
Years	Team	Apps	(Gls)
2010	Pumas Morelos	5	(1)
2010–2015	UNAM	83	(4)
2014	→ Toluca (loan)	25	(0)
2015–2022	Santos Laguna	131	(3)
2016–2017	→ Puebla (loan)	38	(0)
2017–2018	→ América (loan)	6	(0)
2023–2024	Toluca	38	(1)
2025	Atlas	11	(1)

International career
2011	Mexico U20	13	(2)
Medal record
Representing Mexico
Third place	FIFA U-20 World Cup	2011
Pan American Games
Gold medal – first place	2011 Guadalajara	Team competition
- * Club domestic league appearances and goals as of 12 May 2024

Carlos Emilio Orrantia Treviño (born 1 February 1991), also known as El Charal, is a Mexican professional footballer who plays as a right-back.

== Club career ==
In December 2015, Puebla signed Orrantia on loan from Santos Laguna.

== Honours ==
UNAM

- Mexican Primera División: Clausura 2011

Santos Laguna

- Liga MX: Clausura 2015
- Campeón de Campeones: 2015

Mexico Youth

- CONCACAF U-20 Championship: 2011
- Pan American Games: 2011
