= Jonathan Cubero =

Uruguayan footballer (born 1994)

Mathías Cubero
Personal information
- Full name: Jonathan Mathías Cubero Rieta
- Date of birth: 15 January 1994 (age 32)
- Place of birth: Montevideo, Uruguay
- Height: 1.85 m (6 ft 1 in)
- Position: Goalkeeper

Team information
- Current team: Lito
- Number: 12

Senior career*
Years	Team	Apps	(Gls)
2010–2015	Cerro	14	(0)
2015–2021	Torque	67	(0)
2021	Atenas de San Carlos	4	(0)
2022	Deportes Quindío	35	(0)
2023	Racing de Montevideo	0	(0)
2023	→ Potencia (loan)	3	(0)
2024–2025	Cerro	37	(0)
2026–	Lito		

International career^{‡}
2009	Uruguay U15	16	(0)
2010–2011	Uruguay U17	30	(0)
2011	Uruguay U22	2	(0)
2012–2013	Uruguay U20	13	(0)
Medal record
Representing Uruguay
Men's Football
Pan American Games
Bronze medal – third place	2011 Guadalajara
FIFA U-20 World Cup
Runner-up	2013 Turkey
South American U-20 Championship
Third place	2013 Argentina
FIFA U-17 World Cup
Runner-up	2011 Mexico
South American U-17 Championship
Runner-up	2011 Ecuador
- * Club domestic league appearances and goals as of 21 June 2026 ‡ National team caps and goals as of 13 January 2013

Jonathan Mathías Cubero Rieta (born 15 January 1994) is a Uruguayan professional footballer who plays for Uruguayan Primera División Amateur club Lito.

== Club career ==
Cubero started his career playing with Cerro in 2010. He made his debut on 4 December 2010 against Liverpool.

== International career ==
=== Under-17 ===
During 2011, Cubero played with the Uruguayan national under-17 football team at the 2011 FIFA U-17 World Cup in Mexico, where he was chosen the best goalkeeper of the tournament. Previously, he played the 2011 South American Under-17 Football Championship in Ecuador.

=== Under-22 ===
In 2011, he was named to participate in the Uruguay national football team under-22 squad for the 2011 Pan American Games.

== Career statistics ==
As of 18 March 2025

Appearances and goals by club, season and competition
Club	Season	League			Cup		Total	
Club	Season	Division	Apps	Goals	Apps	Goals	Apps	Goals
Cerro	2010–11	Uruguayan Primera División	1	0	—		1	0
Cerro	2012–13	Uruguayan Primera División	1	0	—		1	0
Cerro	2013–14	Uruguayan Primera División	3	0	—		3	0
Cerro	2014–15	Uruguayan Primera División	9	0	—		9	0
Cerro	Total		14	0	0	0	14	0
Torque	2015–16	Uruguayan Segunda División	18	0	—		18	0
Torque	2016	Uruguayan Segunda División	10	0	—		10	0
Torque	2017	Uruguayan Segunda División	26	0	—		26	0
Torque	2018	Uruguayan Primera División	10	0	—		10	0
Torque	2020	Uruguayan Primera División	3	0	—		3	0
Torque	Total		67	0	0	0	67	0
Atenas	2021	Uruguayan Segunda División	4	0	—		4	0
Deportes Quindío	2022	Categoría Primera B	35	0	2	0	37	0
Potencia (loan)	2023	Uruguayan Segunda División	3	0	—		3	0
Cerro	2024	Uruguayan Primera División	21	0	—		21	0
Cerro	2025	Uruguayan Primera División	1	0	—		1	0
Cerro	Total		22	0	0	0	22	0
Career total			145	0	2	0	147	0

== Honours ==
=== International ===
Uruguay U-17

- 2011 FIFA U-17 World Cup: Runner-Up
- 2011 South American Under-17 Football Championship: Runner-Up

Uruguay U-20

- 2013 FIFA U-20 World Cup: Runner-Up

=== Individual ===
- 2011 FIFA U-17 World Cup: Golden Glove
