= David Achucarro =

Argentine professional footballer

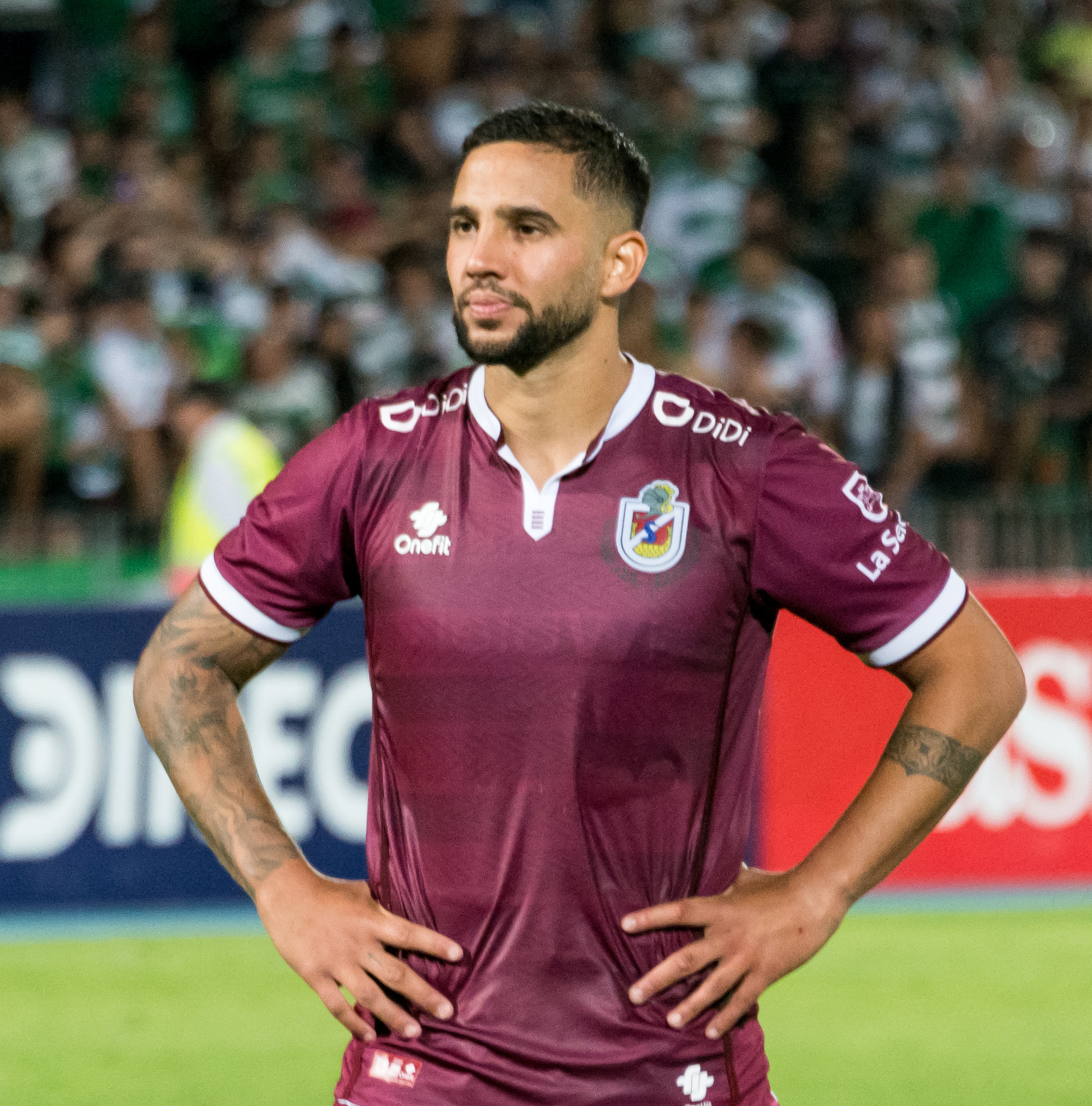

Personal information
- Full name: David Eduardo Achucarro Trinidad
- Date of birth: 5 January 1991 (age 35)
- Place of birth: González Catán, Argentina
- Height: 1.80 m (5 ft 11 in)
- Position: Centre-back

Team information
- Current team: Talleres RdE

Senior career*
Years	Team	Apps	(Gls)
2009–2015	Boca Juniors	2	(0)
2012–2013	→ Douglas Haig (loan)	27	(1)
2013–2014	→ Godoy Cruz (loan)	15	(0)
2014	→ Olimpo (loan)	5	(0)
2015	→ Ferro Carril Oeste (loan)	32	(1)
2016	Talleres	11	(0)
2016–2017	Temperley	0	(0)
2017–2019	Nueva Chicago	38	(0)
2019	Cúcuta Deportivo	19	(0)
2020	Deportes La Serena	12	(0)
2021	San Telmo	24	(0)
2022	Nueva Chicago	28	(0)
2023	Almagro	22	(1)
2024–	Talleres RdE	28	(0)

International career
2009–2011	Argentina U20		
- * Club domestic league appearances and goals as of 17:37, 21 August 2025 (UTC)

David Eduardo Achucarro Trinidad (born 5 January 1991) is an Argentine professional footballer who plays as a centre-back for Talleres RdE.

== Club career ==
Achucarro started out in the system of Boca Juniors, where he played at the 2011 U-20 Copa Libertadores. He made two appearances in the 2009–10 season, against Arsenal de Sarandí and Banfield respectively which were his only matches in the Primera División; though he did feature in the Copa Argentina in March 2012 versus Central Córdoba. Four months later, Achucarro was loaned to Douglas Haig. Twenty-eight games and one goal, against Crucero del Norte, came in Primera B Nacional. He returned to tier one with Godoy Cruz in 2013, prior to securing loans to Olimpo and Ferro Carril Oeste.

2016 saw Achucarro depart Boca Juniors permanently to sign with Talleres. Eleven appearances followed in the 2016 Primera B Nacional, which the club finished as champions to therefore win promotion to the Primera División. He subsequently left on 20 July 2016, joining top-flight Temperley. However, despite remaining for almost thirteen months, Achucarro didn't feature in any competitive fixture for the club. A return to Primera B Nacional was completed in August 2017, with the defender agreeing a move to Nueva Chicago. He made his debut on 2 October in a 2–0 win over All Boys at the Estadio Nueva Chicago.

On 11 June 2019, following two campaigns with Nueva Chicago, Achucarro went abroad for the first time after penning terms with Categoría Primera A side Cúcuta Deportivo. His bow for the Colombian outfit arrived on 15 July, playing for the full duration of a 1–3 win over Rionegro Águilas. He appeared nineteen times, prior to departing due to lack of payment. In January 2020, Achucarro switched Colombia for Chile as he signed for Deportes La Serena. Despite joining ahead of the 2020 season, Achucarro appeared in the 2019 play-offs which took place in January; as they won a spot in the Primera División.

== International career ==
Achucarro represented Argentina's U20s at the 2011 Pan American Games, appearing in three fixtures as they finished with the silver medal. He had previously been called up for the 2009 Toulon Tournament.

== Career statistics ==
As of 9 July 2020.

Appearances and goals by club, season and competition
Club	Season	League			Cup		League Cup		Continental		Other		Total	
Club	Season	Division	Apps	Goals	Apps	Goals	Apps	Goals	Apps	Goals	Apps	Goals	Apps	Goals
Boca Juniors	2009–10	Argentine Primera División	2	0	0	0	—		0	0	0	0	2	0
Boca Juniors	2010–11	Argentine Primera División	0	0	0	0	—		0	0	0	0	0	0
Boca Juniors	2011–12	Argentine Primera División	0	0	1	0	—		0	0	0	0	1	0
Boca Juniors	2012–13	Argentine Primera División	0	0	0	0	—		0	0	0	0	0	0
Boca Juniors	2013–14	Argentine Primera División	0	0	0	0	—		0	0	0	0	0	0
Boca Juniors	2014	Argentine Primera División	0	0	0	0	—		0	0	0	0	0	0
Boca Juniors	2015	Argentine Primera División	0	0	0	0	—		0	0	0	0	0	0
Boca Juniors	Total		2	0	1	0	—		0	0	0	0	3	0
Douglas Haig (loan)	2012–13	Primera B Nacional	27	1	1	0	—		—		0	0	28	1
Godoy Cruz (loan)	2013–14	Argentine Primera División	15	0	1	0	—		—		0	0	16	0
Olimpo (loan)	2014	Argentine Primera División	5	0	1	0	—		—		0	0	6	0
Ferro Carril Oeste (loan)	2015	Primera B Nacional	32	1	3	0	—		—		2 (Note: Appearance(s) in the Primera B Nacional play-offs)	0	37	1
Talleres	2016	Primera B Nacional	11	0	0	0	—		—		0	0	11	0
Temperley	2016–17	Argentine Primera División	0	0	0	0	—		—		0	0	0	0
Nueva Chicago	2017–18	Primera B Nacional	15	0	0	0	—		—		0	0	15	0
Nueva Chicago	2018–19	Primera B Nacional	23	0	0	0	—		—		1	0	24	0
Nueva Chicago	Total		38	0	0	0	—		—		1	0	39	0
Cúcuta Deportivo	2019	Categoría Primera A	19	0	0	0	—		—		0	0	19	0
Deportes La Serena	2019	Primera B	0	0	0	0	—		—		1 (Note: Appearance(s) in the Primera B play-offs)	0	1	0
Deportes La Serena	2020	Chilean Primera División	8	0	0	0	—		—		0	0	8	0
Deportes La Serena	total		8	0	0	0	—		—		1	0	9	0
Career total			157	2	7	0	—		0	0	4	0	168	2

== Honours ==
Boca Juniors

- Copa Argentina: 2011–12

Talleres

- Primera B Nacional: 2016
