= Adrián Martínez (footballer, born February 1992) =

Argentine footballer

Personal information
- Full name: Adrián Nahuel Martínez
- Date of birth: 13 February 1992 (age 34)
- Place of birth: Buenos Aires, Argentina
- Height: 1.77 m (5 ft 10 in)
- Position: Right-back

Team information
- Current team: Nueva Chicago
- Number: 14

Senior career*
Years	Team	Apps	(Gls)
2011–2013	San Lorenzo	12	(0)
2012–2013	→ Olimpo (loan)	34	(0)
2013–2019	Olimpo	59	(3)
2016	→ Arsenal Sarandí (loan)	0	(0)
2016–2017	→ Defensa y Justicia (loan)	0	(0)
2017–2018	→ Guillermo Brown (loan)	18	(1)
2019–2020	All Boys	13	(1)
2020–2022	Sacachispas	72	(2)
2023	Temperley	25	(0)
2024–	Nueva Chicago	46	(2)

International career
2010–2011	Argentina U-20	13	(0)
2011–2012	Argentina U-23	13	(0)
- * Club domestic league appearances and goals as of 18:15, 19 June 2025 (UTC)

Adrián Nahuel Martínez (born 13 February 1992) is an Argentine footballer who plays for Nueva Chicago, mainly as a right back, but can also play right midfield.

== San Lorenzo ==
Martínez made his debut on 12 November 2011 for San Lorenzo under Leonardo Carol Madelón, and played well despite the 1–0 defeat to All Boys. He currently plays under coach Ricardo Caruso Lombardi.

== U-20 international career ==
Martinez has played in Argentina's national teams from U-15 to U-20's and won two titles in the Argentine youth team in 2010, the Copa Aerosur and the Hexagonal Cordoba International 2010. He came third in the South American Youth Championship held in Peru 2011, he also came 4th in the World Cup U-20 2011 held in Colombia, and came second losing to Mexico (1–0) therefore winning a silver medal in the 2011 Pan American Games held in Mexico.

== Style of play ==
Martinez's key skills include speed withe ball, crossing and tackling.

== Club statistics ==
As of 21 May 2012

Club	Season	League		Cup		Continental		Total	
Club	Season	Apps	Goals	Apps	Goals	Apps	Goals	Apps	Goals
San Lorenzo	2011-12	12	0	2	0	-	-	14	0
