= Mauricio Prieto =

Uruguayan footballer (born 1987)

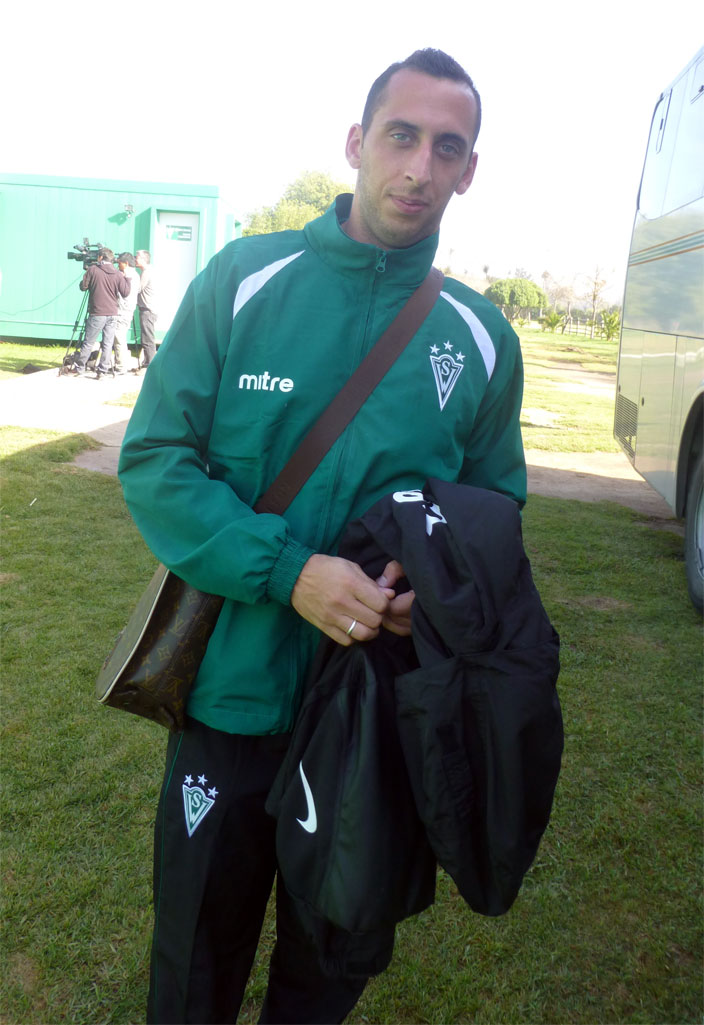

Personal information
- Full name: Mauricio Prieto Garcés
- Date of birth: September 26, 1987 (age 39)
- Place of birth: Montevideo, Uruguay
- Height: 1.82 m (6 ft 0 in)
- Position: Centre back

Team information
- Current team: Racing Montevideo
- Number: 29

Youth career
- River Plate

Senior career*
Years	Team	Apps	(Gls)
2007–2012	River Plate	60	(4)
2011	→ FC Kuban (loan)	0	(0)
2012–2016	Santiago Wanderers	114	(6)
2016–2019	Bolívar	88	(5)
2020	Deportes Temuco	3	(0)
2020–	Racing Montevideo	12	(0)

International career
2006–2007	Uruguay U20	2	(0)
2011	Uruguay U22	4	(0)
- * Club domestic league appearances and goals as of 10:10, 20 March 2021 (UTC)

Mauricio Prieto full name Mauricio Prieto Garcés (born September 26, 1987, in Montevideo, Uruguay) is a Uruguayan footballer. He currently plays for Racing Club de Montevideo.

== International career ==
=== Under-20 ===
Prieto was part of Uruguay's 2007 FIFA U-20 World Cup squad, playing two matches.

=== Under-22 ===
In 2011, he was named to participate in the Uruguay national football team under-22 squad for the 2011 Pan American Games.
