= Federico Puppo =

Uruguayan footballer (born 1986)

Personal information
- Full name: Carlos Federico Puppo Gross
- Date of birth: 6 December 1986 (age 39)
- Place of birth: Colonia del Sacramento, Uruguay
- Height: 1.78 m (5 ft 10 in)
- Position: Forward

Senior career*
Years	Team	Apps	(Gls)
2004–2006	Montevideo Wanderers	9	(0)
2006–2011	River Plate	57	(18)
2011	Danubio	10	(2)
2012–2014	Chicago Fire	11	(0)
2012	→ Defensor Sporting (loan)	12	(5)
2013	→ LDU Quito (loan)	13	(2)
2013	→ Defensor Sporting (loan)	2	(0)
2015	CA Fénix	8	(0)
2015–2017	Plaza Colonia	47	(7)

International career^{‡}
2011	Uruguay U-22	3	(3)
- * Club domestic league appearances and goals as of 27 August 2018 ‡ National team caps and goals as of 4 January 2013

Carlos Federico Puppo Gross (born 6 December 1986) is a Uruguayan footballer.

== Club career ==
Federico Puppo began his career in the youth ranks of Montevideo Wanderers and made his first team debut in 2004. In 2006, he moved to Uruguayan Primera División rivals River Plate. While with River he made 57 league appearances and scored 37 goals. He helped River win the 2008 Clausura championship and was a key player in the club's historic run to the Copa Sudamericana 2009 semifinals. In 2011, he joined Danubio, and made 10 appearances scoring 5 goals as the club finished second during the 2011 Apertura campaign.

On 11 January 2012 it was announced that Puppo had signed with Chicago Fire in Major League Soccer.

Puppo struggled in his first season with Chicago, and was loaned out to Defensor Sporting on 23 July 2012 for the remainder of 2012.

On 26 January 2013, Puppo was loaned out to LDU Quito for the 2013 season.

On 24 February 2014 Chicago Fire and Puppo have mutually agreed to terminate the contract.

== International career ==
In 2011, Puppo was named to participate for the Uruguay national football team under-22 squad at the 2011 Pan American Games.
