= Carlos Luque =

Argentine footballer

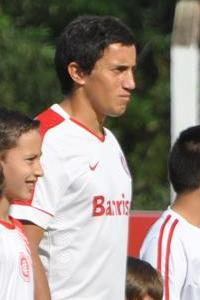

Personal information
- Full name: Carlos Martín Luque
- Date of birth: 1 March 1993 (age 33)
- Place of birth: Las Varillas, Córdoba, Argentina
- Height: 1.76 m (5 ft 9 1/2 in)
- Position: Left winger

Team information
- Current team: Vida

Youth career
- 2001–2011: Colón

Senior career*
Years	Team	Apps	(Gls)
2011–2014	Colón	70	(3)
2014–2018	Internacional	2	(0)
2015–2016	→ Peñarol (loan)	14	(1)
2016–2017	→ Alcorcón (loan)	25	(0)
2017–2018	→ San Martín (SJ) (loan)	16	(0)
2019	Internacional B		
2020–	Vida	0	(0)

International career
2011–2013	Argentina U20	4	(0)
2011	Argentina U23	5	(0)
- * Club domestic league appearances and goals as of 27 January 2019

Carlos Martín Luque (born 1 March 1993) is an Argentine footballer who plays for C.D.S. Vida in Honduras as a left winger.

== Club career ==
Born in Las Varillas, Córdoba, Luque joined Colón's youth setup in 2001, aged eight. He made his first team – and Primera División – debut on 13 March 2011, coming on as a second-half substitute in a 0–4 home loss against Racing Club.

Luque scored his first professional goal on 30 November 2011, netting the first in a 2–1 Copa Argentina home win against Talleres de Córdoba. He became a regular starter for the club only during the 2013–14 campaign, contributing with two goals in 27 appearances.

In May 2014 Luque joined Brazilian Série A club Internacional, for a fee of US$ 2.45 million. He made his debut for the club on 20 July, replacing Charles Aránguiz in a 4–0 home rout of Flamengo.

After being rarely used by Inter, Luque subsequently served loan stints at Peñarol and Alcorcón.

In January 2020 Luque moved to Honduras and joined C.D.S. Vida.

== International career ==
Luque was called up for the Argentina under-20s by coach Walter Perazzo and was part of the squad in the 2011 FIFA U-20 World Cup. He also appeared in that year's Pan American Games.

== Honours ==
Internacional

- Campeonato Gaúcho: 2015

Peñarol

- Primera División: 2015–16
