= Jerónimo Amione =

Mexican footballer (born 1990)

Personal information
- Full name: Jerónimo Arturo Amione Cevallos
- Date of birth: 31 March 1990 (age 36)
- Place of birth: Mexico City, Mexico
- Height: 1.75 m (5 ft 9 in)
- Position: Forward

Youth career
- 2009–2010: Atlante UTN

Senior career*
Years	Team	Apps	(Gls)
2010–2013	Atlante	53	(8)
2010	→ Atlante UTN	1	(1)
2013–2014	Cruz Azul	19	(2)
2014	→ Cruz Azul Hidalgo	1	(0)
2014–2015	Toluca	26	(2)
2015–2018	Puebla	41	(2)
2018	Lobos BUAP	10	(2)
2018	Oaxaca	16	(2)
2019	FC Lahti	15	(4)
2020	Zacatecas	2	(0)
Total		184	(23)

International career
2011–2012	Mexico U23	11	(4)
Medal record
Representing Mexico
Pan American Games
Gold medal – first place	2011 Guadalajara	Team competition
Olympic Qualifying Championship
Winner	2012 United States
- * Club domestic league appearances and goals

Jerónimo Arturo Amione Cevallos (born 31 March 1990) is a Mexican former professional footballer who played as a forward.

Born in Mexico, Amione is Lebanese from his father's side, and Mexican from his mother's side. He represented Mexico at youth level at the 2011 Pan American Games, winning the tournament. Amione obtained Lebanese citizenship in 2017; however, FIFA didn't consider him eligible for the national team as he had already represented Mexico competitively prior to becoming Lebanese.

== Club career ==
Amione made his senior debut for Atlante on 23 April 2010 as a substitute in a match against Estudiantes Tecos, he scored a goal in the 9 minutes he played in a 3–2 defeat. He was runner up in the 2013 Copa MX, where they lost to Cruz Azul. Later that year, he joined Cruz Azul.

On 30 December 2018, Amione signed for FC Lahti in Finland on a one-year deal with an option to extend it with one further year. He signed for Ascenso MX side Mineros de Zacatecas on 23 January 2020.

== International career ==
=== Mexico ===
Amione was part of the under-23 side, in which Mexico captured its gold medal in 2011 Pan American Games. He also appeared in the 2012 CONCACAF Men's Olympic Qualifying Tournament, however he was not included in the final 18 squad to participate in the 2012 Olympic football tournament. Mexico later won its first ever gold medal in their history. Amione scored four goals in 11 appearances for the Olympic team.

=== Lebanon ===
Due to not being further selected into the main squad of Mexico, speculation emerged that he had opted to join the Lebanese national team. The rumours were confirmed when he accepted the offer to play for Lebanon. On 18 December 2018, FIFA refused the Lebanese Football Association's request of changing Amione's national team from Mexico to Lebanon on the basis that "at the time of his first appearance [...] for Mexico, he did not yet hold the Lebanese nationality", a prerequisite necessary for changing national teams.

== Personal life ==
Born in Mexico City, Amione is of Lebanese descent on his father's side (from the Lebanese town of Amioun) and of Mexican descent on his mother's side. He obtained Lebanese citizenship on 14 November 2017.

== Honours ==
Atlante

- Copa MX runner-up: Clausura 2013

Cruz Azul

- CONCACAF Champions League: 2013–14

Mexico U23

- Pan American Games: 2011
- CONCACAF Olympic Qualifying Championship: 2012
