= Fernando Coniglio =

Argentine footballer

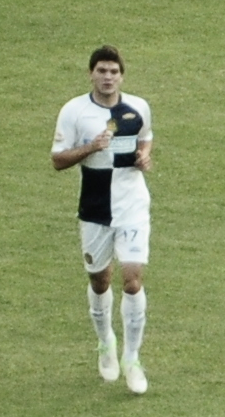

Personal information
- Date of birth: 24 November 1991 (age 34)
- Place of birth: Laborde, Argentina
- Height: 1.84 m (6 ft 0 in)
- Position: Forward

Team information
- Current team: Puteolana
- Number: 24

Youth career
- Rosario Central

Senior career*
Years	Team	Apps	(Gls)
2009–2013	Rosario Central	27	(3)
2013–2014	→ Sarmiento (loan)	11	(0)
2014	→ Sportivo Belgrano (loan)	24	(5)
2015	→ Unión de Santa Fe (loan)	7	(0)
2016	Chacarita Juniors	21	(11)
2016–2017	Olimpo	27	(10)
2017–2023	Huracán	23	(3)
2018	→ Lanús (loan)	8	(0)
2019	→ Tenerife (loan)	16	(0)
2021	→ Curicó Unido (loan)	13	(1)
2021	→ San Luis (loan)	12	(4)
2022	→ Santa Fe (loan)	17	(0)
2022	→ Delfín (loan)	10	(0)
2023	→ Tristán Suárez (loan)	9	(2)
2023–2024	Anagennisi Karditsa	28	(10)
2024–	Puteolana	12	(2)

International career
2011	Argentina U22	3	(0)
Medal record
Representing Argentina
Men's football
Pan American Games
Silver medal – second place	2011 Guadalajara	Team
- * Club domestic league appearances and goals as of 17 November 2024

Fernando Coniglio (born 24 November 1991) is an Argentine professional footballer who plays as a forward for Italian Serie D club Puteolana.
