= Guillermo de los Santos =

Uruguayan footballer (born 1991)

Personal information
- Full name: Guillermo Daniel de los Santos Viana
- Date of birth: 15 February 1991 (age 35)
- Place of birth: Montevideo, Uruguay
- Height: 1.81 m (5 ft 11 in)
- Position: Centre back

Team information
- Current team: Defensor Sporting
- Number: 3

Senior career*
Years	Team	Apps	(Gls)
2011–2013	Cerro	60	(9)
2013–2015	Nacional	32	(0)
2015–2018	Defensor Sporting	44	(1)
2017	→ Universidad Católica de Quito (loan)	15	(0)
2018–2022	Universidad Católica de Quito	112	(3)
2022	Coritiba	25	(0)
2023–	Defensor Sporting	95	(11)

International career
2011	Uruguay U20	3	(0)
2011	Uruguay U22	3	(0)
- * Club domestic league appearances and goals as of 1 October 2025

Guillermo Daniel de los Santos Viana (born 15 February 1991) is a Uruguayan footballer who plays as a centre back for Defensor Sporting.

== Club career ==
De los Santos started his career playing with Cerro in 2011. He made his debut on 20 February 2011 against Defensor Sporting. On 19 June 2013, he signed for Club Nacional de Football.

== International career ==
=== Under-20 ===
During 2009, De los Santos played with the Uruguay national U20 football team at the 2011 FIFA U-20 World Cup in Colombia.

=== Under-22 ===
In 2011, he was named to participate in the Uruguay national U23 team for the 2011 Pan American Games.

== Career statistics ==
=== Club ===
As of 14 April 2024

Club	Division	League			State League		Cup		Continental		Total	
Club	Division	Season	Apps	Goals	Apps	Goals	Apps	Goals	Apps	Goals	Apps	Goals
Cerro	Uruguayan Primera División	2010-11	9	1	—		—		—		9	1
Cerro	Uruguayan Primera División	2011-12	23	4	—		—		—		23	4
Cerro	Uruguayan Primera División	2012-13	28	4	—		—		—		28	4
Cerro	Total		60	9	0	0	0	0	0	0	60	9
Nacional	Uruguayan Primera División	2013-14	21	0	—		—		4	0	25	0
Nacional	Uruguayan Primera División	2014-15	11	0	—		—		2	0	13	0
Nacional	Total		32	0	0	0	0	0	6	0	38	0
Defensor Sporting	Uruguayan Primera División	2015-16	11	0	—		—		5	0	16	0
Defensor Sporting	Uruguayan Primera División	2016	14	1	—		—		—		14	1
Defensor Sporting	Uruguayan Primera División	2017	19	0	—		—		2	0	21	0
Defensor Sporting	Uruguayan Primera División	2023	31	2	—		—		0	0	31	2
Defensor Sporting	Uruguayan Primera División	2024	7	3	—		1	0	2	0	10	3
Defensor Sporting	Total		82	6	0	0	1	0	9	0	92	6
Universidad Católica de Quito	Ecuadorian Serie A	2017	15	0	—		—		—		15	0
Universidad Católica de Quito	Ecuadorian Serie A	2018	39	2	—		—		—		39	2
Universidad Católica de Quito	Ecuadorian Serie A	2019	29	0	—		—		6	0	35	0
Universidad Católica de Quito	Ecuadorian Serie A	2020	23	1	—		—		1	0	24	1
Universidad Católica de Quito	Ecuadorian Serie A	2021	21	0	—		—		4	1	25	1
Universidad Católica de Quito	Total		127	3	0	0	0	0	11	1	138	4
Coritiba	Campeonato Brasileiro Série A	2022	14	0	11	0	4	1	—		29	1
Career total			315	9	11	0	5	1	26	1	357	24
