= Maxi Rodríguez (Uruguayan footballer) =

Uruguayan footballer (born 1990)

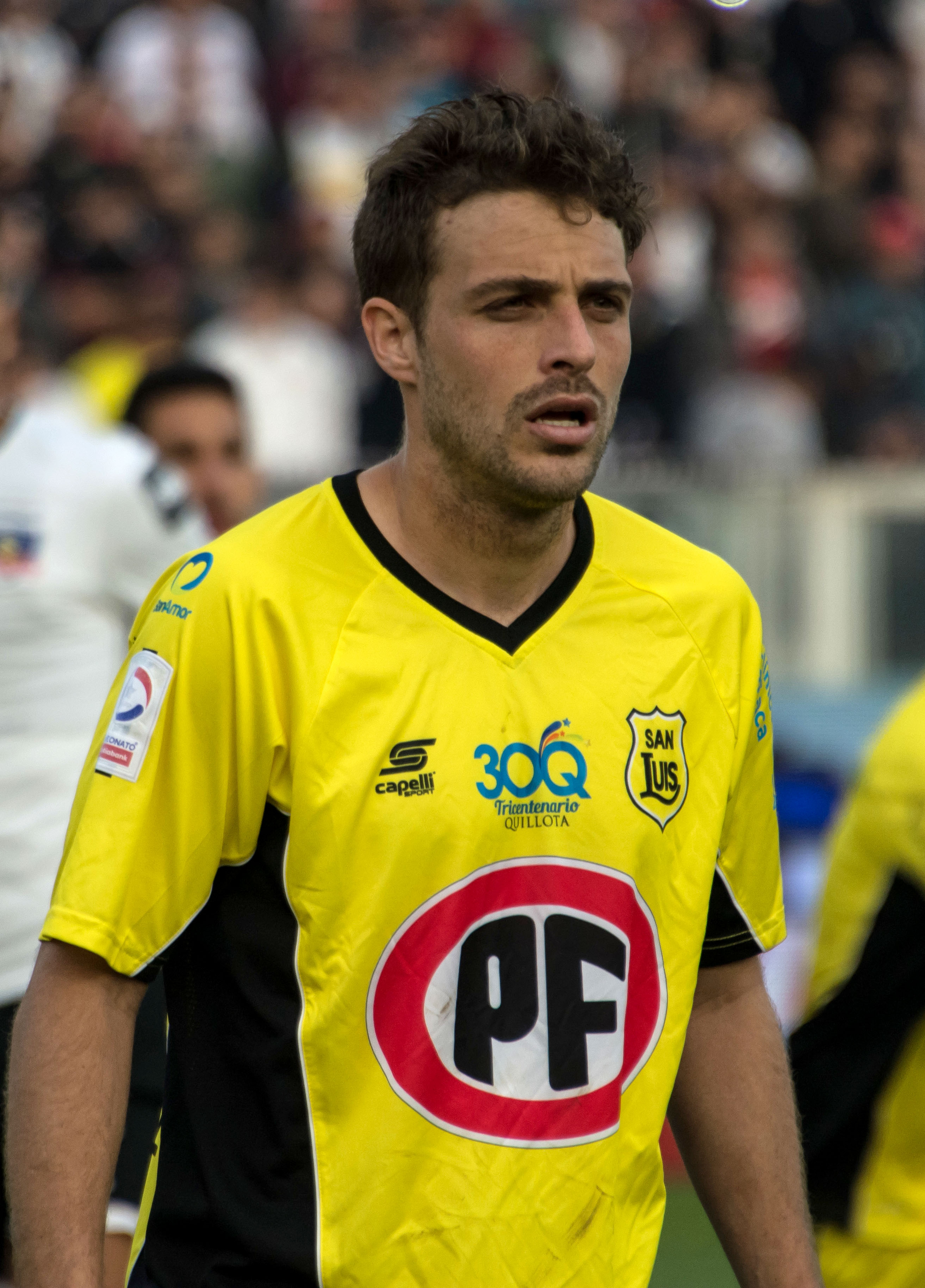

Personal information
- Full name: Maximiliano Rodríguez Maeso
- Date of birth: 2 October 1990 (age 36)
- Place of birth: Montevideo, Uruguay
- Height: 1.81 m (5 ft 11 1/2 in)
- Position: Attacking midfielder

Youth career
- –2009: Montevideo Wanderers

Senior career*
Years	Team	Apps	(Gls)
2009–2013	Montevideo Wanderers	97	(27)
2013–2017	Grêmio	46	(7)
2014	→ Vasco da Gama (loan)	19	(2)
2015	→ Univ. de Chile (loan)	12	(2)
2016	→ Peñarol (loan)	14	(4)
2017–2018	San Martín SJ	16	(1)
2018	San Luis	11	(1)
2019	Peñarol	3	(0)
2019–2020	Tigre	4	(0)
2020	Villa Teresa	13	(0)
2021	Paraná	11	(0)
2021	São José-RS	4	(0)

International career
2011	Uruguay U23	5	(1)
- * Club domestic league appearances and goals as of 20:11, 14 May 2022 (UTC)

Maximiliano Rodríguez Maeso (born 2 October 1990) is an Uruguayan professional footballer who plays as an attacking midfielder.

== Career ==
Born in Montevideo, Rodríguez finished his formation with local Montevideo Wanderers. He made his professional debut on 23 August 2009, against Peñarol, and scored his first professional goal on 24 January 2010 against the same team.

In 2012–13 season, Rodríguez scored 15 goals in only 22 appearances (9 in Apertura and 6 in Clausura). On 10 May 2013, he was signed a four-year deal with Grêmio.

On 6 July Rodríguez made his Campeonato Brasileiro Série A debut, in a 1–1 away draw against Atlético-PR. He appeared regularly during the campaign, scoring four goals in 18 matches; highlights in a match against Náutico on 11 September, where he applied three subsequent nutmegs in Jean Rolt, and also assisted Paulinho in the last of the 2–0 away success.

In August 2014, after only appearing sparingly during the year, Rodríguez was loaned to Vasco da Gama until December. He returned to Tricolor after appearing regularly for the former, which won promotion back to the top division at first attempt.

On 5 January 2015 Rodríguez joined Universidad de Chile, also in a temporary deal.
