= Lucas Kruspzky =

Argentine footballer (born 1992)

Personal information
- Full name: Lucas Nahuel Kruspzky
- Date of birth: 6 April 1992 (age 34)
- Place of birth: Buenos Aires, Argentina
- Height: 1.71 m (5 ft 7 in)
- Position: Left-back

Team information
- Current team: Patronato
- Number: 30

Youth career
- 2008–2009: Independiente

Senior career*
| Years | Team | Apps | (Gls) |
| 2009–2012 | Independiente | 5 | (0) |
| 2012–2013 | Arsenal Sarandí | 9 | (0) |
| 2013–2014 | San Martín (SJ) | 35 | (0) |
| 2014–2015 | Atlético de Rafaela | 18 | (1) |
| 2016–2017 | CA Talleres | 3 | (0) |
| 2017–2019 | Aldosivi | 7 | (0) |
| 2019–2020 | Santamarina | 20 | (0) |
| 2020– | Patronato | 34 | (0) |

International career
| 2009 | Argentina U17 | 4 | (0) |
| 2011 | Argentina U22 | 4 | (1) |
- * Club domestic league appearances and goals as of 19:56, 1 August 2022 (UTC)

Lucas Kruspzky (born 6 April 1992) is an Argentine professional footballer who plays as a left-back for Patronato.

== Club career ==
Kruspzky debuted in the first team of Independiente in a 1–2 defeat to Estudiantes de La Plata, for the 16th fixture of the 2010 Apertura.

In 2014, he signed for Atlético de Rafaela.

== International career ==
Kruspzky was born in Argentina and is of Polish descent. He was called for the Argentina U-17 national team in 2009, being part of the squad in the 2009 South American Under-17 Football Championship and the 2009 FIFA U-17 World Cup. He also played for the U-21 team the 2009 Toulon Tournament.

In 2011, he was selected by coach Walter Perazzo for the Argentina U-20 national team, to play in the 2011 FIFA U-20 World Cup.

== Personal life ==
Kruspzky's younger brother, Facundo, is also a professional footballer.
