= Leonardo Pais =

Uruguayan footballer (born 1994)

Personal information
- Full name: Leonardo Javier Pais Corbo
- Date of birth: July 7, 1994 (age 32)
- Place of birth: Minas, Uruguay
- Height: 1.86 m (6 ft 1 in)
- Position: Midfielder

Youth career
- Defensor Sporting

Senior career*
Years	Team	Apps	(Gls)
2012–2016	Defensor Sporting	33	(2)
2016–2018	Torque	74	(4)
2019	Juárez	8	(0)
2019	Liverpool Montevideo	14	(0)
2020–2022	Montevideo Wanderers	64	(8)
2022	Cruzeiro	17	(1)
2023	Montevideo Wanderers	32	(4)
2024	Deportes Copiapó	13	(0)

International career
2011–2012	Uruguay U17	15	(1)
2011–2014	Uruguay U20	14	(0)
- * Club domestic league appearances and goals as of 9 October 2024

Leonardo Javier Pais Corbo (born 7 July 1994) is a Uruguayan footballer who plays as a midfielder. He last played for Chilean Primera División side Deportes Copiapó.

== Club career ==
Pais began his professional playing career with Defensor Sporting, and made his professional debut on 1 December 2012, against Cerro Largo. Pais finished the season with 10 appearances.

On April 19, 2022, he agreed to go to Cruzeiro, team from Brazil.

In 2024, he moved to Chile and signed with Deportes Copiapó. On 9 October 2024, he and his teammate Nicolás Vargas were fired before the 2024 season ended.

== International career ==
Pais played for both under-17 and under-20 levels, also appearing in 2011 Pan American Games.
