= Ezequiel Cirigliano =

Argentine footballer (born 1992)

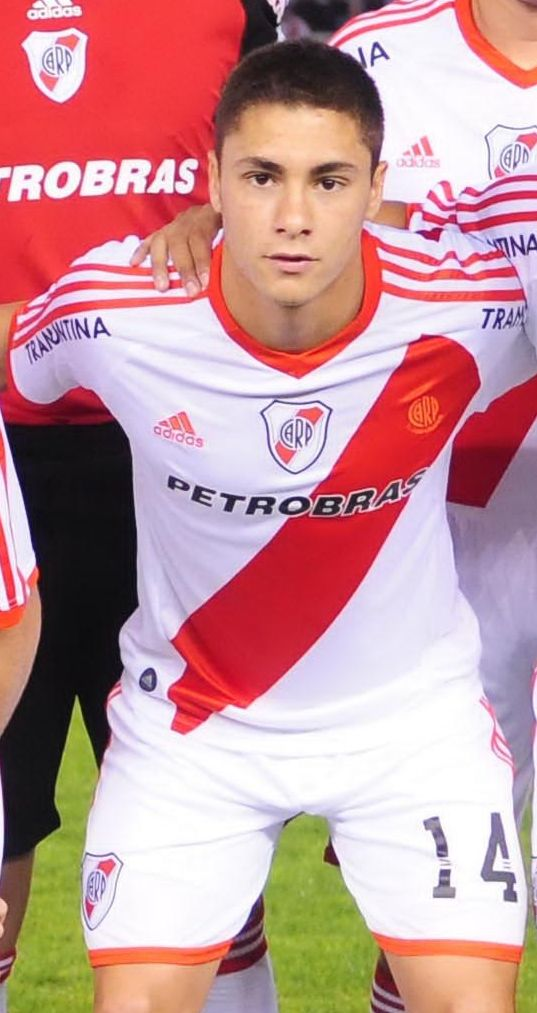

Personal information
- Full name: Adrián Ezequiel Cirigliano
- Date of birth: 24 January 1992 (age 34)
- Place of birth: Caseros, Buenos Aires, Argentina
- Height: 1.72 m (5 ft 7 1/2 in)
- Position: Defensive midfielder

Youth career
- River Plate

Senior career*
Years	Team	Apps	(Gls)
2010–2016	River Plate	61	(0)
2013–2014	→ Hellas Verona (loan)	13	(0)
2015	→ FC Dallas (loan)	8	(0)
2016	→ Tigre (loan)	6	(0)
2016–2017	Atlético Tucumán	2	(0)
2017–2020	Zacatepec	61	(0)
2020	San Luis	12	(0)
2021	Godoy Cruz	1	(0)
2022	Albalonga	2	(0)
2024–	Stallion Laguna	5	(0)

International career
2009	Argentina U17	2	(0)
2011	Argentina U20	13	(1)
- * Club domestic league appearances and goals as of 21:45, 27 November 2022 (UTC)

Adrián Ezequiel Cirigliano (Latin American Spanish: [eseˈkjel siɾiɣˈljano]; born 24 January 1992) is an Argentine footballer, who plays as a midfielder for Stallion Laguna of the Philippines Football League.

== Club career ==
Cirigliano made his first team debut for River Plate on April 11, 2010, in a 0–0 away draw with Atlético Tucumán. At 18, he started the game against Atlético alongside 36-year-old Matías Almeyda in midfield. A tough tackling midfielder who is useful on the ball, Cirigliano has been likened to a cross between Xavi and Javier Mascherano.

On July 18, 2013, Cirigliano joined the newly promoted Serie A club Hellas Verona on a loan deal.

On the first days of July, 2014, Cirigliano returns to River Plate coming back from his loan and attends practice. He refuses to travel to the pre-season in an attempt to negotiate a definitive transfer to Hellas Verona, which subsequently fails. Therefore, coach Marcelo Gallardo separates him from the rest of the squad.

On September 10, 2014, after being pardoned by the director, Cirigliano starts practice with River Plate's reserve team in order to re-join the squad and be able to play again.

On July 20, 2015, FC Dallas announced the deal has been reached to take the player on-loan from River Plate. Per league policy, terms were not revealed, though the club will be using their Target Allocation Money to help fund the loan-deal. He was released by Dallas in January 2016 and signed on loan by Club Atlético Tigre, resigning contract in May 2016.

On July 12, 2017, Cirigliano signed with Zacatepec.

== International career ==
Cirigliano played for the Argentina national under-17 football team the 2009 South American Under-17 Football Championship and the 2009 FIFA U-17 World Cup, and with the Argentina national under-20 football team the 2011 South American Youth Championship. He has also been selected for the 2011 FIFA U-20 World Cup.

== Honours ==
River Plate

- Primera B Nacional: 2011–12
- Copa Sudamericana: 2014
