= Martín Rodríguez (footballer, born 1989) =

Uruguayan footballer

Personal information
- Full name: Martín Sebastián Rodríguez Prantl
- Date of birth: 20 September 1989 (age 37)
- Place of birth: Montevideo, Uruguay
- Height: 1.91 m (6 ft 3 in)
- Position: Goalkeeper

Youth career
- Montevideo Wanderers

Senior career*
Years	Team	Apps	(Gls)
2009–2014	Montevideo Wanderers	49	(0)
2014–2016	Juventud Las Piedras	6	(0)
2016–2017	Deportivo Pereira	3	(0)
2017–2018	Montevideo Wanderers	55	(0)
2018–2019	Racing Montevideo	25	(0)
2019–2020	Vitória	28	(0)
2020–2021	Operário Ferroviário	9	(0)
2021	Santa Cruz	1	(0)
2021–2022	Nacional	20	(0)
2023–2025	Guaraní	21	(0)
2026	Unión Española	4	(0)

International career
2009	Uruguay U19	10	(0)
2011	Uruguay U22	5	(0)
- * Club domestic league appearances and goals as of 28 April 2026

Martín Sebastián Rodríguez Prantl (born 20 September 1989) is a Uruguayan footballer who plays as a goalkeeper. Besides Uruguay, he has played in Colombia, Brazil, Paraguay and Chile.

== Career ==
In February 2026, Rodríguez moved to Chile and signed with Unión Española. He ended his contract on 28 April of the same year.
