= 2011 FIFA U-17 World Cup squads =

Each team was required to submit a list of not more than 21 players, of which three were required to be designated as goalkeepers. Only the numbers 1 to 21 were permitted to be used, with the number 1 being assigned one of the designated goalkeepers.

Names in bold went on to earn full international caps.

== Group A ==
=== Congo ===
Head coach: (France) Eddie Hudanski

No.	Pos.	Player	Date of birth (age)	Caps	Club
1	GK	Chill Ngakosso	26 July 1994 (aged 16)		(Republic of the Congo) ACNFF
2	DF	Cisse Bassoumba	13 May 1996 (aged 15)		(Republic of the Congo) ACNFF
3	DF	Stevy Samba	3 May 1994 (aged 17)		(Republic of the Congo) ACNFF
4	MF	**Charlevy Mabiala**	31 March 1996 (aged 15)		(Republic of the Congo) ACNFF
5	DF	Melvan Lekandza	2 April 1994 (aged 17)		(Republic of the Congo) ACNFF
6	MF	Tierry Kouyikou	17 January 1995 (aged 16)		(Republic of the Congo) ACNFF
7	MF	Ange Sitou	24 May 1994 (aged 17)		(Republic of the Congo) ACNFF
8	MF	**Hardy Binguila**	17 July 1996 (aged 14)		(Republic of the Congo) ACNFF
9	FW	Elvia Ipamy	27 September 1994 (aged 16)		(Republic of the Congo) ACNFF
10	FW	Justalain Kounkou	2 August 1996 (aged 14)		(Republic of the Congo) ACNFF
11	DF	Ramaric Etou	25 January 1995 (aged 16)		(Republic of the Congo) ACNFF
12	FW	Gildas Mpassi	10 January 1994 (aged 17)		(Republic of the Congo) AC Léopard
13	DF	Gloire Mayanith	13 October 1994 (aged 16)		(Republic of the Congo) ACNFF
14	FW	Christ Nkounkou	27 July 1994 (aged 16)		(Republic of the Congo) ACNFF
17	FW	Stevy Epako	17 April 1995 (aged 16)		(Republic of the Congo) ACNFF
18	FW	**Kader Bidimbou**	20 February 1996 (aged 15)		(Republic of the Congo) ACNFF
19	MF	**Amour Loussoukou**	5 December 1996 (aged 14)		(Republic of the Congo) ACNFF
20	FW	**Mavis Tchibota**	7 May 1996 (aged 15)		(Republic of the Congo) Étoile du Congo
21	GK	**Pavelh Ndzila**	12 January 1995 (aged 16)		(Republic of the Congo) ACNFF

=== Mexico ===
Head coach: Raúl Gutiérrez

No.	Pos.	Player	Date of birth (age)	Caps	Club
1	GK	Richard Sánchez	5 April 1994 (aged 17)		(United States) FC Dallas
2	DF	Francisco Flores	17 January 1994 (aged 17)		(Mexico) Cruz Azul
3	DF	**Carlos Guzmán**	19 May 1994 (aged 17)		(Mexico) Morelia
4	DF	Antonio Briseño	2 February 1994 (aged 17)		(Mexico) Atlas
5	DF	Jorge Caballero	25 January 1994 (aged 17)		(Mexico) Monterrey
6	MF	Kevin Escamilla	21 February 1994 (aged 17)		(Mexico) UNAM
7	MF	Jonathan Espericueta	9 August 1994 (aged 16)		(Mexico) UANL
8	MF	Julio Gómez	13 August 1994 (aged 16)		(Mexico) Pachuca
9	FW	**Carlos Fierro**	24 July 1994 (aged 16)		(Mexico) Guadalajara
10	FW	**Alfonso González**	9 May 1994 (aged 17)		(Mexico) Atlas
11	FW	**Marco Bueno**	31 March 1994 (aged 17)		(Mexico) Pachuca
12	GK	José González	14 January 1995 (aged 16)		(Mexico) Pachuca
13	DF	Luis Solorio	1 August 1994 (aged 16)		(Mexico) Guadalajara
14	DF	Fabián Guzmán	30 April 1994 (aged 17)		(Mexico) Atlas
15	DF	Felipe Sifuentes	16 February 1994 (aged 17)		(Mexico) Monterrey
16	MF	Enrique Flores	25 March 1994 (aged 17)		(Mexico) Monterrey
17	FW	Giovani Casillas	4 January 1994 (aged 17)		(Mexico) Guadalajara
18	MF	José Tostado	28 July 1994 (aged 16)		(Mexico) Guadalajara
19	DF	Daniel Hernández	16 February 1994 (aged 17)		(Mexico) Atlas
20	FW	Marcelo Gracia	2 April 1994 (aged 17)		(Mexico) Monterrey
21	GK	Dilan Nicoletti	3 April 1994 (aged 17)		(Argentina) Newell's Old Boys

=== Netherlands ===
Head coach: Albert Stuivenberg

No.	Pos.	Player	Date of birth (age)	Caps	Club
1	GK	Boy de Jong	10 April 1994 (aged 17)		(Netherlands) Feyenoord
2	DF	Daan Disveld	20 January 1994 (aged 17)		(Netherlands) NEC
3	DF	**Terence Kongolo**	14 February 1994 (aged 17)		(Netherlands) Feyenoord
4	DF	**Karim Rekik**	2 December 1994 (aged 16)		(England) Manchester City
5	DF	**Jetro Willems**	30 March 1994 (aged 17)		(Netherlands) Sparta Rotterdam
6	MF	Kyle Ebecilio	17 February 1994 (aged 17)		(England) Arsenal
7	FW	Jordi Bitter	19 January 1994 (aged 17)		(Netherlands) Ajax
8	MF	Yassin Ayoub	6 March 1994 (aged 17)		(Netherlands) Utrecht
9	MF	Anass Achahbar	13 January 1994 (aged 17)		(Netherlands) Feyenoord
10	MF	**Tonny Vilhena**	3 January 1995 (aged 16)		(Netherlands) Feyenoord
11	FW	**Memphis Depay**	13 February 1994 (aged 17)		(Netherlands) PSV
12	FW	**Danzell Gravenberch**	13 February 1994 (aged 17)		(Netherlands) Ajax
13	MF	**Thom Haye**	9 February 1995 (aged 16)		(Netherlands) AZ
14	MF	Joris van Overeem	1 June 1994 (aged 17)		(Netherlands) AZ
15	DF	**Nathan Aké**	18 January 1995 (aged 16)		(Netherlands) Feyenoord
16	GK	Peter Leeuwenburgh	23 March 1994 (aged 17)		(Netherlands) Ajax
17	DF	Menno Koch	2 July 1994 (aged 16)		(Netherlands) PSV
18	FW	Gyliano van Velzen	14 April 1994 (aged 17)		(England) Manchester United
19	FW	Rewien Ramlal	7 March 1994 (aged 17)		(Netherlands) Willem II
20	MF	Adnan Bajić	28 February 1994 (aged 17)		(Netherlands) Sparta Rotterdam
21	GK	Eric Verstappen	19 May 1994 (aged 17)		(Netherlands) PSV

=== North Korea ===
Head coach: An Ye-gun

No.	Pos.	Player	Date of birth (age)	Caps	Club
1	GK	An Kang-chol	1 November 1994 (aged 16)		(North Korea) Amrokgang
2	DF	**Jong Kwang-sok**	5 January 1994 (aged 17)		(North Korea) Chobyong
3	DF	Choe Chol-ryong	29 January 1994 (aged 17)		(North Korea) Chobyong
4	DF	**Pak Myong-song**	31 March 1994 (aged 17)		(North Korea) Sobaeksu
5	DF	Ro Myong-song	2 January 1995 (aged 16)		(North Korea) Rimyongsu
6	MF	O Jin-song	4 March 1994 (aged 17)		(North Korea) Sobaeksu
7	MF	Kang Nam-gwon	6 March 1995 (aged 16)		(North Korea) Chobyong
8	MF	**Ju Jong-chol**	20 October 1994 (aged 16)		(North Korea) Amrokgang
9	FW	**Jang Ok-chol**	14 January 1994 (aged 17)		(North Korea) Kigwancha
10	FW	**Jo Kwang**	5 August 1994 (aged 16)		(North Korea) Sobaeksu
11	FW	**Hong Jin-song**	20 February 1994 (aged 17)		(North Korea) Sobaeksu
12	FW	So Jong-hyok	1 July 1995 (aged 15)		(North Korea) 4.25
13	DF	Jong Il-hyok	7 May 1994 (aged 17)		(North Korea) Chobyong
14	MF	Ri Ji-song	1 May 1994 (aged 17)		(North Korea) Chobyong
15	DF	**Kwon Chung-hyok**	21 January 1994 (aged 17)		(North Korea) 4.25
16	MF	Choe Myong-song	8 January 1994 (aged 17)		(North Korea) Chobyong
17	DF	**Kim Chol-bom**	16 July 1994 (aged 16)		(North Korea) Sobaeksu
18	GK	Ri Son-chan	4 March 1994 (aged 17)		(North Korea) Chobyong
19	FW	Kang Su-yun	3 August 1994 (aged 16)		(North Korea) 4.25
20	FW	Kang Yong-jin	23 March 1994 (aged 17)		(North Korea) Amrokgang
21	GK	Cha Jong-hun	19 April 1994 (aged 17)		(North Korea) Pyongyang City

== Group B ==
=== Argentina ===
Head coach: Oscar Garré

No.	Pos.	Player	Date of birth (age)	Caps	Club
1	GK	Bruno Galván	8 May 1994 (aged 17)		(Argentina) Boca Juniors
2	DF	Ezequiel Báez	28 June 1994 (aged 16)		(Argentina) Racing
3	DF	Marcos Pinto	25 January 1994 (aged 17)		(Argentina) Lanús
4	DF	Enzo Beloso	20 February 1994 (aged 17)		(Argentina) Newell's Old Boys
5	MF	Gaspar Iñíguez	26 March 1994 (aged 17)		(Argentina) Argentinos Juniors
6	DF	Facundo Cardozo	6 April 1995 (aged 16)		(Argentina) Vélez Sársfield
7	FW	**Lucas Ocampos**	11 July 1994 (aged 16)		(Argentina) River Plate
8	MF	Matías Montero	7 May 1994 (aged 17)		(Argentina) River Plate
9	FW	Lucas Vera Piris	2 January 1994 (aged 17)		(Argentina) Lanús
10	MF	Brian Ferreira	24 May 1994 (aged 17)		(Argentina) Vélez Sársfield
11	MF	Jorge Valdez Chamorro	26 May 1994 (aged 17)		(Argentina) Lanús
12	GK	Nicolás Sequeira	30 August 1994 (aged 16)		(Argentina) Lanús
13	DF	Maximiliano Padilla	29 August 1994 (aged 16)		(Argentina) Boca Juniors
14	DF	Alexis Zárate	8 May 1994 (aged 17)		(Argentina) Independiente
15	MF	Pablo Carreras	3 March 1995 (aged 16)		(Argentina) River Plate
16	DF	**Jonathan Silva**	29 June 1994 (aged 16)		(Argentina) Estudiantes
17	FW	Agustín Allione	28 October 1994 (aged 16)		(Argentina) Vélez Sársfield
18	FW	Lucas Pugh	1 January 1994 (aged 17)		(Argentina) River Plate
19	DF	Juan Rodríguez	28 February 1994 (aged 17)		(Argentina) River Plate
20	FW	Martín Benítez	17 June 1994 (aged 17)		(Argentina) Independiente
21	GK	Nicolás Carrasco	27 May 1994 (aged 17)		(Argentina) River Plate

=== France ===
Head coach: Patrick Gonfalone

No.	Pos.	Player	Date of birth (age)	Caps	Club
1	GK	Quentin Beunardeau	27 February 1994 (aged 17)		(France) Le Mans
2	DF	**Jordan Ikoko**	3 February 1994 (aged 17)		(France) Paris Saint-Germain
3	DF	**Benjamin Mendy**	17 July 1994 (aged 16)		(France) Le Havre
4	DF	Raphaël Calvet	7 February 1994 (aged 17)		(France) Auxerre
5	DF	**Kurt Zouma**	27 October 1994 (aged 16)		(France) Saint-Étienne
6	MF	Adrien Tameze	4 February 1994 (aged 17)		(France) Nancy
7	MF	Adam N'Kusu	29 January 1994 (aged 17)		(France) Le Havre
8	MF	Soualiho Meïté	17 March 1994 (aged 17)		(France) Auxerre
9	FW	**Lenny Nangis**	24 March 1994 (aged 17)		(France) Caen
10	MF	Abdallah Yaisien	23 April 1994 (aged 17)		(France) Paris Saint-Germain
11	FW	**Sébastien Haller**	22 June 1994 (aged 17)		(France) Auxerre
12	DF	**Antoine Conte**	29 January 1994 (aged 17)		(France) Paris Saint-Germain
13	DF	**Aymeric Laporte**	27 May 1994 (aged 17)		(Spain) Athletic Bilbao
14	MF	Karl Madianga	30 January 1994 (aged 17)		(France) Le Mans
15	DF	Pierre Bourdin	6 January 1994 (aged 17)		(France) Paris Saint-Germain
16	GK	**Lionel Mpasi**	1 August 1994 (aged 16)		(France) Paris Saint-Germain
17	MF	Jordan Vercleyen	7 February 1994 (aged 17)		(France) Le Havre
18	FW	Gaëtan Laborde	3 May 1994 (aged 17)		(France) Bordeaux
19	GK	Paul Nardi	18 May 1994 (aged 17)		(France) Nancy
20	FW	**Yassine Benzia**	8 September 1994 (aged 16)		(France) Lyon
21	MF	**Tiémoué Bakayoko**	16 August 1994 (aged 16)		(France) Rennes

=== Jamaica ===
Head coach: Wendell Downswell

No.	Pos.	Player	Date of birth (age)	Caps	Club
1	GK	Richard Trench	8 May 1994 (aged 17)		(Jamaica) Rusea's HS
2	DF	Oshane Jenkins	20 March 1994 (aged 17)		(Jamaica) Cavalier SC
3	DF	Kemo Wallace	29 September 1994 (aged 16)		(Jamaica) Harbour View F.C.
4	DF	Jason Wint	14 February 1994 (aged 17)		(Jamaica) Portmore United F.C.
5	DF	**Alvas Powell**	18 July 1994 (aged 16)		(Jamaica) Portmore United F.C.
6	DF	Quante Smith	12 February 1994 (aged 17)		(Canada) Brampton United
7	FW	**Romario Williams**	15 August 1994 (aged 16)		(Jamaica) Cavalier SC
8	MF	Romario Jones	15 May 1994 (aged 17)		(Jamaica) Cavalier SC
9	MF	**Omar Holness**	13 March 1994 (aged 17)		(Jamaica) Real Mona FC
10	FW	Jason Wright	26 December 1994 (aged 16)		(Jamaica) Cavalier SC
11	MF	**Andre Lewis**	12 August 1994 (aged 16)		(Jamaica) Cavalier SC
12	DF	Patrick Palmer	25 July 1994 (aged 16)		(Jamaica) Cavalier SC
13	GK	Odean Clarke	9 January 1994 (aged 17)		(Jamaica) Holland United
14	FW	Jevani Brown	16 October 1994 (aged 16)		(England) Milton Keynes Dons F.C.
15	FW	Anthony Walker	7 October 1994 (aged 16)		(Jamaica) Rusea's HS
16	MF	Troy Moo Penn	22 July 1995 (aged 15)		(Jamaica) Mile Gully FC
17	MF	Melvin Blair	18 January 1994 (aged 17)		(Jamaica) Frome FC
18	DF	Zhelano Barnes	29 April 1994 (aged 17)		(Jamaica) Cavalier SC
19	MF	**Cardel Benbow**	3 June 1995 (aged 16)		(Jamaica) Waterford United F.C.
20	MF	Shawn Lawson	13 January 1994 (aged 17)		(Canada) Ajax Strikers
21	GK	Nico Campbell	22 February 1994 (aged 17)		(Jamaica) Cavalier SC

=== Japan ===
Head coach: Yoshitake Hirofumi

No.	Pos.	Player	Date of birth (age)	Caps	Club
1	GK	**Kosuke Nakamura**	27 February 1995 (aged 16)		(Japan) Kashiwa Reysol
2	DF	Naoki Kawaguchi	24 May 1994 (aged 17)		(Japan) Albirex Niigata
3	DF	Takuya Iwanami	18 June 1994 (aged 17)		(Japan) Vissel Kobe
4	DF	**Naomichi Ueda**	24 October 1994 (aged 16)		(Japan) Ohzu High School
5	MF	Kazuki Fukai	11 March 1995 (aged 16)		(Japan) Consadole Sapporo
6	DF	**Sei Muroya**	5 April 1994 (aged 17)		(Japan) Aomori Yamada High School
7	MF	Reo Mochizuki	18 January 1995 (aged 16)		(Japan) Yasu High School
8	MF	Hideki Ishige	21 September 1994 (aged 16)		(Japan) Shimizu S-Pulse
9	FW	**Takumi Minamino**	16 January 1995 (aged 16)		(Japan) Cerezo Osaka
10	FW	Ryuga Suzuki	28 February 1994 (aged 17)		(Japan) Kashima Antlers
11	FW	Masaya Matsumoto	25 January 1995 (aged 16)		(Japan) JFA Academy Fukushima
12	DF	Fumiya Hayakawa	12 January 1994 (aged 17)		(Japan) Albirex Niigata
13	MF	Takuya Kida	23 August 1994 (aged 16)		(Japan) Yokohama F. Marinos
14	FW	**Shoya Nakajima**	23 August 1994 (aged 16)		(Japan) Tokyo Verdy
15	DF	Jumpei Arai	12 November 1994 (aged 16)		(Japan) Urawa Red Diamonds
16	MF	Hideyuki Nozawa	15 August 1994 (aged 16)		(Japan) FC Tokyo
17	MF	Hiroki Akino	8 October 1994 (aged 16)		(Japan) Kashiwa Reysol
18	GK	Shunta Awaka	7 February 1995 (aged 16)		(Japan) Consadole Sapporo
19	DF	Daisuke Takagi	14 October 1995 (aged 15)		(Japan) Tokyo Verdy
20	FW	**Musashi Suzuki**	11 February 1994 (aged 17)		(Japan) Kiryu Daiichi High School
21	GK	Ayumi Niekawa	12 May 1994 (aged 17)		(Japan) Júbilo Iwata

== Group C ==
=== Canada ===
Head coach: Sean Fleming

No.	Pos.	Player	Date of birth (age)	Caps	Club
1	GK	**Maxime Crépeau**	5 November 1994 (aged 16)		(Canada) Montreal Impact Academy
2	MF	**Samuel Piette**	11 December 1994 (aged 16)		(France) Metz
3	DF	Adam Polakiewicz	3 August 1994 (aged 16)		(Canada) Vancouver Whitecaps Residency
4	DF	Ismaïl Benomar	26 April 1994 (aged 17)		(Canada) Montreal Impact Academy
5	DF	**Daniel Stanese**	21 January 1994 (aged 17)		(Canada) Vancouver Whitecaps Residency
6	DF	Parker Seymour	11 April 1994 (aged 17)		(Canada) Toronto FC Academy
7	MF	Marco Lapenna	1 November 1994 (aged 16)		(Canada) Montreal Impact Academy
8	MF	Bryce Alderson	2 May 1994 (aged 17)		(Canada) Vancouver Whitecaps Residency
9	FW	Sadi Jalali	6 June 1995 (aged 16)		(Canada) Edmonton Juventus
10	MF	**Keven Alemán**	25 March 1994 (aged 17)		Unattached
11	FW	Chris Nanco	15 February 1995 (aged 16)		(Canada) Sigma FC Academy
12	MF	Matteo Pasquotti	2 December 1994 (aged 16)		(Canada) Vancouver Whitecaps Residency
13	DF	Luca Gasparotto	3 September 1995 (aged 15)		(Canada) Sporting Club Toronto
14	MF	Omari Morris	4 January 1994 (aged 17)		(Canada) Toronto FC Academy
15	MF	Sergio Camargo	16 August 1994 (aged 16)		(Canada) Toronto FC Academy
16	FW	**Jay Chapman**	1 January 1994 (aged 17)		(Canada) Toronto FC Academy
17	FW	Yassin Essa	8 February 1994 (aged 17)		(Canada) Vancouver Whitecaps Residency
18	GK	**Quillan Roberts**	13 September 1994 (aged 16)		(Canada) Toronto FC Academy
19	MF	Alex Halis	13 April 1994 (aged 17)		(Canada) Sporting Club Toronto
20	MF	**Michael Petrasso**	9 July 1995 (aged 15)		(Canada) Toronto FC Academy
21	GK	Chad Bush	30 May 1994 (aged 17)		(Canada) Toronto FC Academy

=== England ===
Head coach: John Peacock

No.	Pos.	Player	Date of birth (age)	Caps	Club
1	GK	**Jordan Pickford**	7 March 1994 (aged 17)		(England) Sunderland
2	DF	Jordan Cousins	6 March 1994 (aged 17)		(England) Charlton Athletic
3	DF	**Brad Smith**	9 April 1994 (aged 17)		(England) Liverpool
4	MF	John Lundstram	18 February 1994 (aged 17)		(England) Everton
5	DF	Adam Jackson	18 May 1994 (aged 17)		(England) Middlesbrough
6	DF	**Nathaniel Chalobah**	12 December 1994 (aged 16)		(England) Chelsea
7	MF	**Raheem Sterling**	8 December 1994 (aged 16)		(England) Liverpool
8	MF	Nick Powell	23 March 1994 (aged 17)		(England) Crewe Alexandra
9	FW	**Hallam Hope**	17 March 1994 (aged 17)		(England) Everton
10	FW	Max Clayton	9 August 1994 (aged 16)		(England) Crewe Alexandra
11	MF	Jake Forster-Caskey	25 April 1994 (aged 17)		(England) Brighton & Hove Albion
12	MF	George Evans	13 December 1994 (aged 16)		(England) Manchester City
13	GK	Ben Garratt	25 April 1994 (aged 17)		(England) Crewe Alexandra
14	FW	Adam Morgan	21 April 1994 (aged 17)		(England) Liverpool
15	DF	**Sam Magri**	30 March 1994 (aged 17)		(England) Portsmouth
16	FW	Alex Henshall	15 February 1994 (aged 17)		(England) Manchester City
17	FW	**Nathan Redmond**	6 March 1994 (aged 17)		(England) Birmingham City
18	MF	**Blair Turgott**	22 May 1994 (aged 17)		(England) West Ham United
19	DF	Matthew Regan	22 February 1994 (aged 17)		(England) Liverpool
20	MF	Jack Dunn	19 November 1994 (aged 16)		(England) Liverpool
21	GK	Tyrell Belford	5 June 1994 (aged 17)		(England) Liverpool

=== Rwanda ===
Head coach: (France) Richard Tardy

No.	Pos.	Player	Date of birth (age)	Caps	Club
1	GK	Steven Ntalibi	22 December 1994 (aged 16)		(Rwanda) SEC
2	DF	**Michel Rusheshangoga**	25 August 1994 (aged 16)		
3	DF	Celestin Ndayishimiye	11 October 1995 (aged 15)		
4	DF	Eugene Habyarimana	29 October 1994 (aged 16)		(Rwanda) SEC
5	MF	Eric Nsabimana	11 October 1994 (aged 16)		(Rwanda) SEC
6	MF	Robert Ndatimana	11 September 1995 (aged 15)		
7	FW	**Charles Tibingana**	22 December 1994 (aged 16)		(Uganda) Proline FC
8	DF	**Emery Bayisenge**	2 November 1994 (aged 16)		
9	FW	Bonfils Kabanda	18 September 1994 (aged 16)		(France) AS Nancy
10	MF	Andrew Buteera	3 October 1994 (aged 16)		(Uganda) Proline FC
11	FW	**Alfred Mugabo**	9 October 1995 (aged 15)		(England) Arsenal
12	FW	Justin Mico	21 December 1994 (aged 16)		
13	MF	Heritier Turatsinze	30 October 1994 (aged 16)		(Rwanda) SEC
14	MF	Janvier Benedata	12 August 1995 (aged 15)		(Rwanda) APR FC
15	DF	**Faustin Usengimana**	11 June 1994 (aged 17)		(Rwanda) Rayon Sports FC
16	DF	Jean-Marie Rusingizandekwe	1 July 1994 (aged 16)		(Belgium) KV Mechelen
17	FW	Sulaiman Kakira	30 March 1995 (aged 16)		(Rwanda) APR FC
18	GK	Marcel Nzarora	22 November 1994 (aged 16)		
19	FW	Ibrahim Itangishaka	16 September 1994 (aged 16)		(Rwanda) SEC
20	FW	Farouk Ruhinda	18 September 1994 (aged 16)		(Rwanda) Express
21	GK	Kabes Hategikimana	18 April 1994 (aged 17)		

=== Uruguay ===
Head coach: Fabián Coito

No.	Pos.	Player	Date of birth (age)	Caps	Club
1	GK	Mathías Cubero	15 January 1994 (aged 17)		(Uruguay) Cerro
2	DF	**Emiliano Velázquez**	30 April 1994 (aged 17)		(Uruguay) Danubio
3	DF	**Gastón Silva**	5 March 1994 (aged 17)		(Uruguay) Defensor Sporting
4	DF	Agustín Tabárez	15 October 1994 (aged 16)		(Uruguay) Nacional
5	MF	Héber Ignacio Ratti	5 April 1994 (aged 17)		(Uruguay) River Plate
6	DF	Maximiliano Moreira	11 June 1994 (aged 17)		(Uruguay) Nacional
7	MF	Leonardo Pais	7 July 1994 (aged 16)		(Uruguay) Defensor Sporting
8	MF	Elbio Álvarez	13 June 1994 (aged 17)		(Uruguay) Peñarol
9	FW	Sergio Cortelezzi	9 September 1994 (aged 16)		(Uruguay) Nacional
10	MF	Guillermo Méndez	26 August 1994 (aged 16)		(Uruguay) Nacional
11	FW	**Rodrigo Aguirre**	1 October 1994 (aged 16)		(Uruguay) Liverpool
12	GK	Guillermo de Amores	19 October 1994 (aged 16)		(Uruguay) Liverpool
13	FW	Juan Cruz Mascia	3 January 1994 (aged 17)		(Uruguay) Miramar Misiones
14	DF	Santiago Carrera	5 March 1994 (aged 17)		(Uruguay) River Plate
15	MF	Jim Varela	16 October 1994 (aged 16)		(Uruguay) Peñarol
16	FW	Santiago Charamoni	28 January 1994 (aged 17)		(Uruguay) Defensor Sporting
17	DF	Gianni Rodríguez	7 June 1994 (aged 17)		(Uruguay) Danubio
18	DF	Sebastián Canobra	3 November 1994 (aged 16)		(Uruguay) Atenas
19	FW	Juan San Martín	20 January 1994 (aged 17)		(Uruguay) Peñarol
20	DF	Alejandro Furia	15 March 1994 (aged 17)		(Uruguay) Peñarol
21	GK	Gastón Rodríguez	12 February 1994 (aged 17)		(Uruguay) Defensor Sporting

== Group D ==
=== Czech Republic ===
Head coach: Josef Csaplár

No.	Pos.	Player	Date of birth (age)	Caps	Club
1	GK	Patrik Macej	11 June 1994 (aged 16)		(Czech Republic) Baník Ostrava
2	DF	Ondřej Karafiát	1 December 1994 (aged 16)		(Czech Republic) Sparta Prague
3	DF	Jan Filip	6 March 1994 (aged 17)		(Czech Republic) FK Teplice
4	MF	Petr Nerad	6 February 1994 (aged 17)		(Czech Republic) Bohemians 1905
5	DF	Luboš Adamec	27 April 1994 (aged 17)		(Italy) Juventus
6	DF	**Michael Lüftner**	14 March 1994 (aged 17)		(Czech Republic) FK Teplice
7	MF	Aleš Čermák	1 October 1994 (aged 16)		(Czech Republic) Sparta Prague
8	MF	Jindřich Kadula	10 June 1994 (aged 16)		(Czech Republic) České Budějovice
9	FW	Nikoláš Salašovič	20 September 1994 (aged 16)		(Czech Republic) Slavia Prague
10	FW	Lukáš Juliš	2 December 1994 (aged 16)		(Czech Republic) Sparta Prague
11	FW	Patrik Svoboda	13 April 1994 (aged 17)		(Czech Republic) Viktoria Plzeň
12	FW	Zdeněk Linhart	5 March 1994 (aged 17)		(Czech Republic) Dynamo České Budějovice
13	MF	Patrik Kundrátek	15 February 1994 (aged 17)		(Czech Republic) Baník Ostrava
14	FW	Michal Holub	6 March 1994 (aged 17)		(Czech Republic) Sigma Olomouc
15	DF	Jan Štěrba	8 July 1994 (aged 16)		(Czech Republic) Sigma Olomouc
16	GK	Lukáš Zima	9 January 1994 (aged 17)		(Czech Republic) Slavia Prague
17	FW	Dominik Mašek	10 July 1995 (aged 15)		(Czech Republic) 1. FK Příbram
18	FW	Lukáš Stratil	29 January 1994 (aged 17)		(Czech Republic) Baník Ostrava
19	MF	**Michal Trávník**	17 May 1994 (aged 16)		(Czech Republic) 1. FC Slovácko
20	FW	Daniel Černý	19 July 1994 (aged 16)		(Czech Republic) Viktoria Plzeň
21	GK	**Ondřej Kolář**	17 October 1994 (aged 16)		(Czech Republic) Slovan Liberec

=== New Zealand ===
Head coach: Aaron McFarland

No.	Pos.	Player	Date of birth (age)	Caps	Club
1	GK	Scott Basalaj	19 April 1994 (aged 17)		(New Zealand) Team Wellington
2	DF	**Harshae Raniga**	1 October 1994 (aged 16)		(New Zealand) Central United
3	FW	Stephen Carmichael	28 March 1994 (aged 17)		(New Zealand) Central United
4	DF	Reece Lambert	27 March 1994 (aged 17)		(New Zealand) Central United
5	DF	**Luke Adams**	8 May 1994 (aged 17)		(New Zealand) Waitakere United
6	MF	Jordan Vale	15 January 1994 (aged 17)		(New Zealand) Waitakere United
7	DF	**Kip Colvey**	15 March 1994 (aged 17)		(New Zealand) Asia Pacific FA
8	MF	Rhys Jordan	19 October 1994 (aged 16)		(New Zealand) Forrest Hill Milford
9	DF	**Tim Payne**	10 January 1994 (aged 17)		(New Zealand) Waitakere United
10	MF	**Cameron Howieson**	22 December 1994 (aged 16)		(New Zealand) Asia Pacific FA
11	MF	James Debenham	20 February 1994 (aged 17)		(New Zealand) Albany United
12	DF	Jesse Edge	26 February 1995 (aged 16)		(New Zealand) Melville United
13	MF	Cameron Martin	15 September 1994 (aged 16)		(New Zealand) Central United
14	MF	Ryan Howlett	7 May 1994 (aged 17)		(New Zealand) Waitakere United
15	FW	Dylan Stansfield	13 July 1994 (aged 16)		(New Zealand) Forrest Hill Milford
16	DF	**Bill Tuiloma**	27 March 1995 (aged 16)		(New Zealand) Asia Pacific FA
17	MF	Harley Tahau	15 January 1995 (aged 16)		(New Zealand) Asia Pacific FA
18	MF	Calvin Opperman	25 April 1994 (aged 17)		(New Zealand) Asia Pacific FA
19	FW	Ken Yamamoto	26 March 1994 (aged 17)		(New Zealand) Canterbury United
20	GK	Scott Armistead	15 April 1994 (aged 17)		(New Zealand) Oratia United
21	GK	Liam Anderson	20 October 1994 (aged 16)		(New Zealand) Forrest Hill Milford

=== United States ===
Head coach: (Colombia) Wilmer Cabrera

No.	Pos.	Player	Date of birth (age)	Caps	Club
1	GK	Kendall McIntosh	24 January 1994 (aged 17)		(United States) San Jose Earthquakes Academy
2	DF	Zach Carroll	16 March 1994 (aged 17)		(United States) Vardar FC
3	DF	Nathan Smith	18 October 1994 (aged 16)		(United States) Cal Odyssey
4	DF	Joe Amon	14 June 1994 (aged 17)		(United States) South Carolina United
5	MF	Matt Dunn	13 January 1994 (aged 17)		(Germany) 1. FC Köln
6	DF	Mobi Fehr	13 December 1994 (aged 16)		(Japan) Tokyo Verdy 1969
7	FW	Alfred Koroma	19 April 1994 (aged 17)		(United States) Solar Chelsea F.C.
8	MF	Esteban Rodriguez	11 February 1994 (aged 17)		(United States) Cosmos Academy (West)
9	FW	Mario Rodríguez	12 May 1994 (aged 17)		(United States) Central Aztecs
10	MF	Alejandro Guido	22 March 1994 (aged 17)		(United States) Aztecs Premier
11	MF	Marc Pelosi	17 June 1994 (aged 17)		(United States) Aztecs Premier
12	GK	Fernando Piña	29 January 1994 (aged 17)		(United States) Houston Dynamo Academy
13	MF	Nico Melo	23 January 1994 (aged 17)		(United States) Florida Rush
14	MF	Tarik Salkicic	3 June 1994 (aged 17)		(United States) Strictly Soccer
15	DF	Alessandro Mion	23 January 1994 (aged 17)		(United States) Miami FC Kendall
16	DF	**Kellyn Acosta**	24 July 1995 (aged 15)		(United States) FC Dallas Academy
17	MF	Dillon Serna	25 March 1994 (aged 17)		(United States) Colorado Rapids Academy
18	FW	**Paul Arriola**	5 February 1995 (aged 16)		(United States) Arsenal F.C.
19	FW	Jack McBean	15 December 1994 (aged 16)		(United States) Los Angeles Galaxy
20	MF	Andrew Souders	26 February 1994 (aged 17)		(United States) Columbus Crew Academy
21	GK	Wade Hamilton	15 September 1994 (aged 16)		(United States) Arsenal F.C.

=== Uzbekistan ===
Head coach: Alexei Evstafeev

No.	Pos.	Player	Date of birth (age)	Caps	Club
1	GK	Sergey Smorodin	15 February 1994 (aged 17)		(Uzbekistan) Pakhtakor Tashkent
2	DF	Mirzamurod Juraboev	31 May 1994 (aged 17)		(Uzbekistan) Nasaf Qarshi
3	DF	Sardor Rakhmanov	9 July 1994 (aged 16)		(Uzbekistan) Mash'al Mubarek
4	DF	Ravshanjon Haydarov	1 June 1994 (aged 17)		(Uzbekistan) RCOR Tashkent
5	DF	Asiljon Mansurov	4 August 1994 (aged 16)		(Uzbekistan) FMI Yangier
6	MF	Abbosbek Makhstaliev	12 January 1994 (aged 17)		(Uzbekistan) Pakhtakor Tashkent
7	MF	Azizbek Muratov	21 January 1994 (aged 17)		(Uzbekistan) FK Buxoro
8	MF	**Sardor Sabirkhodjaev**	6 November 1994 (aged 16)		(Uzbekistan) Pakhtakor Tashkent
9	MF	Kholmurod Kholmurodov	29 June 1994 (aged 16)		(Uzbekistan) Mash'al Mubarek
10	FW	Nodirkhon Kamolov	22 October 1994 (aged 16)		(Uzbekistan) Neftchi Farg'ona
11	FW	Timur Khakimov	23 August 1994 (aged 16)		(Uzbekistan) Pakhtakor Tashkent
12	GK	Ganisher Kholmurodov	29 November 1994 (aged 16)		(Uzbekistan) Mash'al Mubarek
13	MF	Bobir Davlatov	1 March 1996 (aged 15)		(Uzbekistan) Mash'al Mubarek
14	DF	Javlon Mirabdullaev	19 March 1994 (aged 17)		(Uzbekistan) Bunyodkor
15	FW	Jasurbek Khakimov	24 May 1994 (aged 17)		(Uzbekistan) RCOR Tashkent
16	DF	Khasan Asqarov	14 April 1994 (aged 17)		(Uzbekistan) Bunyodkor
17	MF	Dior Usmankhodjaev	7 February 1994 (aged 17)		(Uzbekistan) RCOR Tashkent
18	MF	Mukhsin Ubaydullaev	15 July 1994 (aged 16)		(Uzbekistan) Pakhtakor Tashkent
19	FW	**Zabikhillo Urinboev**	30 March 1995 (aged 16)		(Uzbekistan) Bunyodkor
20	MF	Davlatbek Yarbekov	27 September 1994 (aged 16)		(Uzbekistan) Neftchi Farg'ona
21	GK	Abdumavlon Abdujalilov	22 December 1994 (aged 16)		(Uzbekistan) Pakhtakor Tashkent

== Group E ==
=== Burkina Faso ===
Head coach: (Portugal) Rui Pereira

No.	Pos.	Player	Date of birth (age)	Caps	Club
1	GK	Sy Aime Coulibaly	31 December 1995 (aged 15)		(Burkina Faso) Kada School
2	DF	Ismaila Zoungrana	17 October 1995 (aged 15)		(Burkina Faso) Kozaf
3	DF	Ismael Bande	16 January 1996 (aged 15)		(Burkina Faso) FABAO
4	MF	**Abdoul Aziz Kaboré**	1 January 1994 (aged 17)		(Burkina Faso) Kada School
5	DF	Romaric Banaba	20 February 1994 (aged 17)		(Togo) AZM
6	MF	Ibrahim Ili	10 November 1994 (aged 16)		(Burkina Faso) Kada School
7	MF	Faical Ouedraogo	31 December 1995 (aged 15)		(Burkina Faso) Kada School
8	DF	Sounkalo Sanou	10 May 1994 (aged 17)		(Burkina Faso) Kada School
9	FW	Zaniou Sana	31 December 1994 (aged 16)		(Burkina Faso) Naba Kango
10	MF	Rashade Sido	28 April 1995 (aged 16)		(Burkina Faso) Naba Kango
11	MF	Abdoul Sanou	27 April 1994 (aged 17)		(Burkina Faso) Kada School
12	DF	Abdou Kabre	3 March 1995 (aged 16)		(Burkina Faso) Kozaf
13	FW	Ben Zerbo	27 August 1994 (aged 16)		(Burkina Faso) Naba Kango
14	MF	Seydou Belem	6 December 1995 (aged 15)		(Burkina Faso) FOGEBU
15	MF	Romaric Pitroipa	31 December 1994 (aged 16)		(Burkina Faso) Kozaf
16	GK	Seni Ouedraogo	8 June 1995 (aged 16)		(Burkina Faso) FOGEBU
17	FW	Ousmane Nana	14 April 1994 (aged 17)		(Burkina Faso) CFAS
18	DF	Patrice Zoungrana	2 December 1994 (aged 16)		(Burkina Faso) ASFA Yennenga
19	DF	**Issouf Paro**	16 October 1994 (aged 16)		(Burkina Faso) IFFA Bobo Dioulasso
20	MF	Yaya Bamba	20 June 1995 (aged 15)		(Burkina Faso) Maya Bobo Dioulasso
21	GK	Toldo Houe	13 May 1995 (aged 16)		(Burkina Faso) Secteur 21 Bobo-Dioulasso

=== Ecuador ===
Head coach: Javier Rodríguez

No.	Pos.	Player	Date of birth (age)	Caps	Club
1	GK	Walter Chávez	6 April 1994 (aged 17)		(Ecuador) LDU Quito
2	DF	Jaime Jordan	28 October 1995 (aged 15)		(Ecuador) Rocafuerte
3	DF	**Marlon Mejía**	21 September 1994 (aged 16)		(Ecuador) Emelec
4	MF	Ridder Alcívar	13 March 1994 (aged 17)		(Ecuador) Universidad Católica
5	DF	**Luis Cangá**	15 June 1995 (aged 16)		(Ecuador) LDU Quito
6	MF	**Cristian Ramírez**	12 August 1994 (aged 16)		(Ecuador) Independiente del Valle
7	FW	Kevin Mercado	28 January 1995 (aged 16)		(Ecuador) LDU Quito
8	FW	**Jonny Uchuari**	19 January 1994 (aged 17)		(Ecuador) LDU Loja
9	FW	Luis Batioja	16 February 1994 (aged 17)		(Ecuador) LDU Quito
10	MF	**Junior Sornoza**	28 January 1994 (aged 17)		(Ecuador) Independiente del Valle
11	FW	Esteban Troya	18 January 1994 (aged 17)		(Ecuador) ESPOLI
12	GK	Darwin Cuero	15 October 1994 (aged 16)		(Ecuador) El Nacional
13	MF	**Carlos Gruezo**	19 April 1995 (aged 16)		(Ecuador) Independiente del Valle
14	FW	Eddy Corozo	28 June 1994 (aged 16)		(Ecuador) Emelec
15	MF	**José Francisco Cevallos**	18 January 1995 (aged 16)		(Ecuador) LDU Quito
16	FW	Kevin Barzola	9 July 1994 (aged 16)		(Ecuador) Rocafuerte
17	FW	Joel Valencia	16 October 1994 (aged 16)		(Spain) Real Zaragoza
18	DF	**Gabriel Cortez**	10 October 1995 (aged 15)		(Ecuador) Independiente del Valle
19	MF	Jhon Mendoza	14 February 1994 (aged 17)		(Ecuador) Barcelona
20	FW	Dennys Hurtado	22 July 1994 (aged 16)		(Ecuador) Emelec
21	GK	Israel Gutiérrez	2 March 1994 (aged 17)		(Ecuador) Deportivo Quito

=== Germany ===
Head coach: Steffen Freund

No.	Pos.	Player	Date of birth (age)	Caps	Club
1	GK	**Odisseas Vlachodimos**	26 April 1994 (aged 17)		(Germany) VfB Stuttgart
2	DF	Mitchell Weiser	21 April 1994 (aged 17)		(Germany) 1. FC Köln
3	DF	Cimo Röcker	21 January 1994 (aged 17)		(Germany) Werder Bremen
4	DF	Koray Günter	16 August 1994 (aged 16)		(Germany) Borussia Dortmund
5	DF	Nico Perrey	2 February 1994 (aged 17)		(Germany) Arminia Bielefeld
6	DF	Robin Yalçın	25 January 1994 (aged 17)		(Germany) VfB Stuttgart
7	FW	Mirco Born	28 June 1994 (aged 16)		(Netherlands) Twente
8	MF	**Emre Can**	12 January 1994 (aged 17)		(Germany) FC Bayern Munich
9	FW	Samed Yeşil	25 May 1994 (aged 17)		(Germany) Bayer Leverkusen
10	MF	Levent Ayçiçek	14 February 1994 (aged 17)		(Germany) Werder Bremen
11	FW	Okan Aydın	8 May 1994 (aged 17)		(Germany) Bayer Leverkusen
12	GK	Cedric Wilmes	13 January 1994 (aged 17)		(Germany) Borussia Dortmund
13	DF	Koray Kacinoglu	20 July 1994 (aged 16)		(Germany) MSV Duisburg
14	DF	**Kaan Ayhan**	10 November 1994 (aged 16)		(Germany) FC Schalke 04
15	DF	Noah Korczowski	8 January 1994 (aged 17)		(Germany) Schalke 04
16	MF	Sven Mende	18 January 1994 (aged 17)		(Germany) VfB Stuttgart
17	FW	**Marvin Ducksch**	7 March 1994 (aged 17)		(Germany) Borussia Dortmund
18	MF	**Rani Khedira**	27 January 1994 (aged 17)		(Germany) VfB Stuttgart
19	FW	Nils Quaschner	22 April 1994 (aged 17)		(Germany) Hansa Rostock
20	MF	Fabian Schnellhardt	12 January 1994 (aged 17)		(Germany) 1. FC Köln
21	GK	Thomas Dähne	4 January 1994 (aged 17)		(Austria) Red Bull Salzburg

=== Panama ===
Head coach: Jorge Dely Valdés

No.	Pos.	Player	Date of birth (age)	Caps	Club
1	GK	Iván Picart	2 August 1994 (aged 16)		(Panama) Río Abajo
2	DF	Shaquile Coronado	20 January 1995 (aged 16)		(Panama) Árabe Unido
3	MF	José Maughn	9 January 1994 (aged 17)		(Panama) Chorrillo
4	DF	Jordy Meléndez	14 July 1994 (aged 16)		(Panama) Chepo
5	DF	**Roberto Chen**	24 May 1994 (aged 17)		(Panama) San Francisco
6	DF	Anel Vargas	24 August 1994 (aged 16)		Unattached
7	MF	Dario Wright	25 April 1994 (aged 17)		(Panama) Millenium
8	MF	Juan Cedeño	12 January 1994 (aged 17)		(Panama) Chorrillo
9	FW	**Omar Browne**	3 May 1994 (aged 17)		(Panama) Millenium
10	MF	**Darwin Pinzón**	2 April 1994 (aged 17)		(Panama) Sporting San Miguelito
11	MF	Aldair Paredes	2 November 1994 (aged 16)		(Panama) Millenium
12	GK	Joseph Vargas	23 May 1994 (aged 17)		(Panama) Millenium
13	DF	**Francisco Narbón**	11 February 1995 (aged 16)		(Panama) Chepo
14	FW	Edson Samms	27 March 1995 (aged 16)		(Panama) San Francisco
15	FW	Romario Piggot	17 July 1995 (aged 15)		(Panama) Chepo
16	DF	Alonzo Goot	26 August 1994 (aged 16)		(Panama) Ciclon
17	MF	Bryan Santamaría	12 May 1994 (aged 17)		(Panama) San Francisco
18	FW	**Jorman Aguilar**	11 September 1994 (aged 16)		(Panama) Río Abajo
19	MF	**Alfredo Stephens**	25 December 1994 (aged 16)		(Panama) Río Abajo
20	MF	**Alexander González**	14 December 1994 (aged 16)		(Panama) Río Abajo
21	GK	Martín Meléndez	23 March 1995 (aged 16)		(Panama) Bagoso

== Group F ==
=== Australia ===
Head coach: (Netherlands) Jan Versleijen

No.	Pos.	Player	Date of birth (age)	Caps	Club
1	GK	**Paul Izzo**	6 January 1995 (aged 16)		(Australia) Adelaide United
2	DF	Jake Monaco	23 June 1994 (aged 16)		(Australia) AIS
3	DF	Connor Chapman	31 October 1994 (aged 16)		(Australia) AIS
4	DF	Tom King	20 July 1994 (aged 16)		(England) Liverpool
5	DF	Corey Brown	7 January 1994 (aged 17)		(Australia) AIS
6	MF	Yianni Perkatis	8 March 1994 (aged 17)		(Australia) AIS
7	MF	Hernan Espindola	19 October 1994 (aged 16)		(Australia) AIS
8	MF	**Mitch Cooper**	18 September 1994 (aged 16)		(Australia) Gold Coast United
9	FW	Dylan Tombides	8 March 1994 (aged 17)		(England) West Ham United
10	FW	Jesse Makarounas	18 April 1994 (aged 17)		(Australia) Perth Glory
11	MF	Luke Remington	12 May 1994 (aged 17)		(Australia) Newcastle Jets
12	GK	Lachlan Tibbles	16 June 1994 (aged 17)		(Australia) AIS
13	FW	Teeboy Kamara	18 May 1996 (aged 15)		(Australia) AIS
14	MF	**Miloš Degenek**	28 April 1994 (aged 17)		(Australia) AIS
15	FW	Anthony Proia	16 March 1994 (aged 17)		(Australia) AIS
16	MF	Stefan Mauk	12 October 1995 (aged 15)		(Australia) AIS
17	MF	Jacob Melling	4 April 1995 (aged 16)		(Australia) Adelaide United
18	GK	Daniel Sadaka	30 January 1994 (aged 17)		(Australia) Sutherland Sharks
19	MF	Mitchell Oxborrow	18 February 1995 (aged 16)		(Australia) AIS
20	DF	Nick Ansell	2 February 1994 (aged 17)		(Australia) Melbourne Victory
21	DF	Riley Woodcock	23 May 1995 (aged 16)		(Australia) AIS

=== Brazil ===
Head coach: Emerson Ávila

No.	Pos.	Player	Date of birth (age)	Caps	Club
1	GK	Charles	4 February 1994 (aged 17)		(Brazil) Cruzeiro
2	DF	Wallace	1 May 1994 (aged 17)		(Brazil) Fluminense
3	DF	**Marquinhos**	14 May 1994 (aged 17)		(Brazil) Corinthians
4	DF	Matheus Barbosa	18 August 1994 (aged 16)		(Brazil) Grêmio
5	MF	Misael	15 July 1994 (aged 16)		(Brazil) Grêmio
6	DF	**Emerson Palmieri**	3 August 1994 (aged 16)		(Brazil) Santos
7	MF	Guilherme	31 March 1994 (aged 17)		(Brazil) Vasco da Gama
8	MF	Marlon Bicá	25 May 1994 (aged 17)		(Brazil) Internacional
9	FW	Ademilson	9 January 1994 (aged 17)		(Brazil) São Paulo
10	FW	Adryan	10 August 1994 (aged 16)		(Brazil) Flamengo
11	FW	Lucas Piazon	20 January 1994 (aged 17)		(Brazil) São Paulo
12	GK	Uilson	28 April 1994 (aged 17)		(Brazil) Atlético Mineiro
13	DF	Cláudio Winck	15 April 1994 (aged 17)		(Brazil) Internacional
14	DF	Josué	28 January 1994 (aged 17)		(Brazil) Vitória
15	DF	Jonathan	11 July 1994 (aged 16)		(Brazil) Grêmio
16	MF	Hernani	27 March 1994 (aged 17)		(Brazil) Atlético Paranaense
17	MF	Bruno Sabia	21 March 1994 (aged 17)		(Brazil) Palmeiras
18	MF	Wellington	8 January 1994 (aged 17)		(Brazil) Vitória
19	FW	Nathan	18 January 1994 (aged 17)		(Brazil) Internacional
20	FW	Léo Bonatini	28 March 1994 (aged 17)		(Brazil) Cruzeiro
21	GK	Jacsson	12 March 1994 (aged 17)		(Brazil) Internacional

=== Ivory Coast ===
Head coach: Pierre Gouaméné

No.	Pos.	Player	Date of birth (age)	Caps	Club
1	GK	Hillel Konaté	28 December 1994 (aged 16)		(France) Sochaux
2	MF	**Jean-Eudes Aholou**	20 March 1994 (aged 17)		(Ivory Coast) Ivoire Academie
3	DF	Mory Koné	21 April 1994 (aged 17)		(France) Le Mans
4	DF	Ibrahima Bah	18 December 1994 (aged 16)		(Ivory Coast) Academie de Sefa
5	DF	Jean Thome	10 October 1995 (aged 15)		(Qatar) Aspire Academy
6	FW	Dorian Kouamé	2 October 1994 (aged 16)		(France) Guingamp
7	FW	**Jean Evrard Kouassi**	25 September 1994 (aged 16)		(Ivory Coast) Moossou
8	FW	**Victorien Angban**	29 September 1996 (aged 14)		(Ivory Coast) Stade d'Abidjan
9	MF	Daniel Soungole	26 February 1995 (aged 16)		(Ivory Coast) AS Athlétic Adjamé
10	MF	Wilfried Gnahoré	30 December 1995 (aged 15)		(England) Nottingham Forest
11	FW	Lionel Lago	9 October 1995 (aged 15)		(Qatar) Aspire Academy
12	FW	Guy Bedi	20 December 1995 (aged 15)		(Ivory Coast) Academie de Foot Amadou Diallo
13	FW	Jeremi Kimmakon	29 May 1994 (aged 17)		(France) Châteauroux
14	DF	Mehoue Traore	23 December 1994 (aged 16)		(Ivory Coast) Séwé Sports de San Pedro
15	FW	Drissa Diarrassouba	15 November 1994 (aged 16)		(Ivory Coast) Ivoire Academie
16	GK	Severin Djé-Yao	10 February 1995 (aged 16)		(Ivory Coast) Denguélé
17	DF	Losseni Karamoko	20 December 1994 (aged 16)		(Ivory Coast) Olympic Sport Abobo
18	FW	Ibrahim Coulibaly	28 December 1995 (aged 15)		(Ivory Coast) Academie de Foot Amadou Diallo
19	FW	Souleymane Coulibaly	26 December 1994 (aged 16)		(Italy) Siena
20	FW	Anderson Banvo	4 February 1994 (aged 17)		(France) Paris Saint-Germain
21	GK	Aboubakar Ouattara	16 November 1995 (aged 15)		(Ivory Coast) Volcan

=== Denmark ===
Head coach: Thomas Frank

No.	Pos.	Player	Date of birth (age)	Caps	Club
1	GK	Oliver Korch	18 June 1994 (aged 17)		(Denmark) Midtjylland
2	DF	Mads Aaquist	31 December 1994 (aged 16)		(Denmark) Copenhagen
3	DF	Frederik Holst	24 September 1994 (aged 16)		(Denmark) Brøndby
4	DF	Nicolai Bak Johannesen	22 May 1994 (aged 17)		(Denmark) Lyngby
5	DF	**Riza Durmisi**	8 January 1994 (aged 17)		(Denmark) Brøndby
6	MF	Patrick Olsen	23 April 1994 (aged 17)		(Denmark) Brøndby
7	MF	**Christian Nørgaard**	10 March 1994 (aged 17)		(Denmark) Lyngby
8	MF	Lasse Vigen Christensen	15 August 1994 (aged 16)		(Denmark) Midtjylland
9	FW	Kenneth Zohore	31 January 1994 (aged 17)		(Denmark) Copenhagen
10	FW	**Viktor Fischer**	9 June 1994 (aged 17)		(Netherlands) Ajax
11	FW	Danny Amankwaa	30 January 1994 (aged 17)		(Denmark) Copenhagen
12	DF	Patrick Banggaard	4 April 1994 (aged 17)		(Denmark) Vejle
13	MF	**Pierre-Emile Højbjerg**	5 August 1995 (aged 15)		(Denmark) Brøndby
14	DF	Derrick Nissen	29 March 1994 (aged 17)		(Denmark) Vejle
15	FW	Lee Rochester Sørensen	30 April 1994 (aged 17)		(Denmark) Køge
16	GK	Christian Schultz	26 February 1994 (aged 17)		(Denmark) Silkeborg
17	FW	**Yussuf Poulsen**	15 June 1994 (aged 17)		(Denmark) Lyngby
18	MF	**Lucas Andersen**	13 September 1994 (aged 16)		(Denmark) AaB
19	DF	Jacob Barrett Laursen	17 November 1994 (aged 16)		(Denmark) AaB
20	FW	Kristian Lindberg	14 February 1994 (aged 17)		(Denmark) Nordsjælland
21	GK	Casper Radza	26 February 1994 (aged 17)		(Denmark) OB
