= 2011 UEFA European Under-17 Championship squads =

Football tournament squads

The 2011 UEFA European Under-17 Football Championship was an international Under-17 age group football tournament held in Serbia from 3 May until 15 May 2011. The 8 national teams involved in the tournament are required to register a squad of 18 players; only players in these squads are eligible to take part in the tournament.

Before the start of the tournament, the UEFA administration provides all participating teams with an official form which must be completed with the 18 players participating in the tournament. Two of these 18 players must be goalkeepers.

The form must be accompanied by the 18 selected players' passports to prove they are eligible for the tournament.

Any injured or sick goalkeepers and a maximum of two injured or sick players may be replaced upon submission of written medical evidence and approved by the UEFA doctor on duty at the tournament. Replaced players can take no further part in the tournament.

The 18 players must wear set numbers between 1 and 99. No number may be used by more than one player in the course of the tournament.

For all matches played in the tournament, players must wear the number indicated on the official list of 18 players.

Players name marked in bold went on to earn full international caps.

== Group A ==
=== Denmark ===
Head coach: Thomas Frank

No.	Pos.	Player	Date of birth (age)	Club
1	GK	Oliver Korch	18 June 1994 (aged 16)	(Danish Football Association) Midtjylland
2	DF	Mads Aaquist	31 December 1994 (aged 16)	(Danish Football Association) Copenhagen
3	DF	Frederik Holst (c)	24 September 1994 (aged 16)	(Danish Football Association) Brøndby
4	DF	Nicolai Johannesen	22 May 1994 (aged 16)	(Danish Football Association) Lyngby
5	DF	**Riza Durmisi**	8 January 1994 (aged 17)	(Danish Football Association) Brøndby
6	MF	Patrick Olsen	23 April 1994 (aged 17)	(Danish Football Association) Brøndby
7	MF	**Christian Nørgaard**	10 March 1994 (aged 17)	(Danish Football Association) Lyngby
8	MF	Lasse Vigen Christensen	15 August 1994 (aged 16)	(Danish Football Association) Midtjylland
9	FW	Kenneth Zohore	31 January 1994 (aged 17)	(Danish Football Association) Copenhagen
10	FW	**Viktor Fischer**	4 June 1994 (aged 16)	(Danish Football Association) Midtjylland
11	FW	Danny Amankwaa	30 January 1994 (aged 17)	(Danish Football Association) Copenhagen
12	DF	Patrick Banggaard	4 April 1994 (aged 17)	(Danish Football Association) Vejle
13	MF	**Pierre-Emile Højbjerg**	5 August 1995 (aged 15)	(Danish Football Association) Brøndby
14	DF	Derrick Nissen	29 March 1994 (aged 17)	(Danish Football Association) Vejle
15	FW	Lee Rochester Sørensen	30 April 1994 (aged 17)	(Danish Football Association) Køge
16	GK	Christian Schultz	13 May 1994 (aged 16)	(Danish Football Association) Silkeborg
17	FW	**Yussuf Poulsen**	16 June 1994 (aged 16)	(Danish Football Association) Lyngby
18	DF	**Lucas Andersen**	17 November 1994 (aged 16)	(Danish Football Association) AaB

=== England ===
Head coach: John Peacock

No.	Pos.	Player	Date of birth (age)	Club
1	GK	**Jordan Pickford**	7 March 1994 (aged 17)	(The Football Association) Sunderland
2	DF	**Jordan Cousins**	6 March 1994 (aged 17)	(The Football Association) Charlton Athletic
3	DF	**Brad Smith**	9 April 1994 (aged 17)	(The Football Association) Liverpool
4	MF	John Lundstram	18 February 1994 (aged 17)	(The Football Association) Everton
5	DF	Adam Jackson	18 May 1994 (aged 16)	(The Football Association) Middlesbrough
6	DF	**Nathaniel Chalobah** (c)	12 December 1994 (aged 16)	(The Football Association) Chelsea
7	MF	**Raheem Sterling**	8 December 1994 (aged 16)	(The Football Association) Liverpool
8	MF	Nick Powell	23 March 1994 (aged 17)	(The Football Association) Crewe Alexandra
9	FW	**Hallam Hope**	17 March 1994 (aged 17)	(The Football Association) Everton
10	FW	Max Clayton	9 August 1994 (aged 16)	(The Football Association) Crewe Alexandra
11	MF	Jake Forster-Caskey	25 April 1994 (aged 17)	(The Football Association) Brighton & Hove Albion
12	DF	Courtney Meppen-Walter	22 August 1994 (aged 16)	(The Football Association) Manchester City
13	GK	Ben Garratt	25 April 1994 (aged 17)	(The Football Association) Crewe Alexandra
14	FW	Adam Morgan	21 April 1994 (aged 17)	(The Football Association) Liverpool
15	DF	**Sam Magri**	30 March 1994 (aged 17)	(The Football Association) Portsmouth
16	FW	Alex Henshall	15 February 1994 (aged 17)	(The Football Association) Manchester City
17	MF	**Nathan Redmond**	6 March 1994 (aged 17)	(The Football Association) Birmingham City
18	MF	**Blair Turgott**	22 May 1994 (aged 16)	(The Football Association) West Ham United

=== France ===
Head coach: Patrick Gonfalone

No.	Pos.	Player	Date of birth (age)	Club
1	GK	Quentin Beunardeau	27 February 1994 (aged 17)	(French Football Federation) Le Mans
2	DF	**Jordan Ikoko**	3 February 1994 (aged 17)	(French Football Federation) Paris Saint-Germain
3	DF	**Benjamin Mendy**	17 July 1994 (aged 16)	(French Football Federation) Le Havre
4	DF	Raphaël Calvet (c)	7 February 1994 (aged 17)	(French Football Federation) Auxerre
5	DF	**Kurt Zouma**	27 October 1994 (aged 16)	(French Football Federation) Saint-Étienne
6	MF	Adrien Tameze	4 February 1994 (aged 17)	(French Football Federation) Nancy
7	FW	Adam N'Kusu	29 January 1994 (aged 17)	(French Football Federation) Le Havre
8	MF	Souahilo Meïté	17 March 1994 (aged 17)	(French Football Federation) Auxerre
9	FW	**Lenny Nangis**	24 March 1994 (aged 17)	(French Football Federation) Caen
10	MF	Abdallah Yaisien	23 April 1994 (aged 17)	(French Football Federation) Paris Saint-Germain
11	FW	**Sébastien Haller**	22 June 1994 (aged 16)	(French Football Federation) Auxerre
12	DF	**Antoine Conte**	29 January 1994 (aged 17)	(French Football Federation) Paris Saint-Germain
13	DF	**Aymeric Laporte**	27 May 1994 (aged 16)	(Royal Spanish Football Federation) Athletic Bilbao
14	MF	Karl Madianga	30 January 1994 (aged 17)	(French Football Federation) Le Mans
15	MF	**Abdoulaye Touré**	3 March 1994 (aged 17)	(French Football Federation) Nantes
16	GK	Lionel Mpasi	1 August 1994 (aged 16)	(French Football Federation) Paris Saint-Germain
17	MF	Jordan Vercleyen	7 February 1994 (aged 17)	(French Football Federation) Le Havre
18	FW	Gaëtan Laborde	3 May 1994 (aged 17)	(French Football Federation) Châteauroux

=== Serbia ===
Head coach: Milovan Đorić

No.	Pos.	Player	Date of birth (age)	Club
1	GK	Nikola Stošić	15 March 1994 (aged 17)	(Football Association of Serbia) Red Star Belgrade
2	DF	Nemanja Jakšić	11 July 1995 (aged 15)	(Football Association of Serbia) OFK Beograd
3	DF	**Bojan Nastić**	6 July 1994 (aged 16)	(Football Association of Serbia) Vojvodina
4	MF	Uroš Radaković (c)	31 March 1994 (aged 17)	(Football Association of Serbia) Red Star Belgrade
5	DF	Milan Savić	4 April 1994 (aged 17)	(Football Association of Serbia) Partizan
6	DF	Marko Marinković	6 January 1994 (aged 17)	(Football Association of Serbia) Red Star Belgrade
7	MF	**Lazar Marković**	2 March 1994 (aged 17)	(Football Association of Serbia) Partizan
8	MF	Dejan Meleg	10 January 1994 (aged 17)	(Football Association of Serbia) Vojvodina
9	FW	Vojno Ješić	4 March 1994 (aged 17)	(German Football Association) 1. FC Köln
10	FW	**Ognjen Ožegović**	9 June 1994 (aged 16)	(Football Association of Serbia) Red Star Belgrade
11	DF	Ognjen Popadić	10 February 1994 (aged 17)	(Football Association of Serbia) Red Star Belgrade
12	GK	Nemanja Latinović	21 February 1994 (aged 17)	(Football Association of Serbia) Hajduk Kula
14	DF	Dobrosav Kostić	9 April 1994 (aged 17)	(German Football Association) 1899 Hoffenheim
15	DF	Nikola Todorić	11 May 1994 (aged 16)	(Football Association of Serbia) Rad
16	MF	Luka Stojanović	4 January 1994 (aged 17)	(Football Association of Serbia) Partizan
17	MF	Aleksandar Filipović	20 December 1994 (aged 16)	(Football Association of Serbia) Jagodina
18	MF	Nikola Ninković	19 December 1994 (aged 16)	(Football Association of Serbia) Partizan
19	FW	Nikola Mandić	15 January 1994 (aged 17)	(Football Association of Serbia) Partizan

== Group B ==
=== Czech Republic ===
Head coach: Josef Csaplár

No.	Pos.	Player	Date of birth (age)	Club
1	GK	Patrik Macej	11 June 1994 (aged 16)	(Football Association of the Czech Republic) Baník Ostrava
2	MF	Ondrej Karafiát	1 December 1994 (aged 16)	(Football Association of the Czech Republic) Sparta Prague
3	DF	Jan Filip	6 March 1994 (aged 17)	(Football Association of the Czech Republic) FK Teplice
4	MF	Petr Nerad	6 February 1994 (aged 17)	(Football Association of the Czech Republic) Bohemians 1905
5	DF	Luboš Adamec	27 April 1994 (aged 17)	(Italian Football Federation) Juventus
6	DF	**Michael Lüftner**	14 March 1994 (aged 17)	(Football Association of the Czech Republic) FK Teplice
8	MF	Jindrich Kadula	10 June 1994 (aged 16)	(Football Association of the Czech Republic) Dynamo České Budějovice
9	MF	Nikolas Salašovic	20 September 1994 (aged 16)	(Football Association of the Czech Republic) Slavia Prague
10	FW	Lukáš Juliš	2 December 1994 (aged 16)	(Football Association of the Czech Republic) Sparta Prague
11	FW	Patrik Svoboda	13 April 1994 (aged 17)	(Football Association of the Czech Republic) Viktoria Plzeň
12	FW	Zdeněk Linhart	5 March 1994 (aged 17)	(Football Association of the Czech Republic) Dynamo České Budějovice
13	MF	Patrik Kundrátek	15 February 1994 (aged 17)	(Football Association of the Czech Republic) Baník Ostrava
14	FW	Michal Holub	6 March 1994 (aged 17)	(Football Association of the Czech Republic) Sigma Olomouc
15	DF	Jan Šterba (c)	8 July 1994 (aged 16)	(Football Association of the Czech Republic) Sigma Olomouc
16	GK	Lukáš Zima	9 January 1994 (aged 17)	(Football Association of the Czech Republic) Slavia Prague
17	FW	Dominik Mašek	10 July 1995 (aged 15)	(Football Association of the Czech Republic) 1. FK Pribram
18	FW	Lukáš Stratil	29 January 1994 (aged 17)	(Football Association of the Czech Republic) Baník Ostrava

=== Germany ===
Head coach: Steffen Freund

No.	Pos.	Player	Date of birth (age)	Club
1	GK	**Odysseas Vlachodimos**	26 April 1994 (aged 17)	(German Football Association) VfB Stuttgart
2	DF	Mitchell Weiser	21 April 1994 (aged 17)	(German Football Association) 1. FC Köln
3	DF	Cimo Röcker	21 January 1994 (aged 17)	(German Football Association) Werder Bremen
4	DF	Koray Günter	16 August 1994 (aged 16)	(German Football Association) Borussia Dortmund
5	DF	Nico Perrey	2 February 1994 (aged 17)	(German Football Association) Arminia Bielefeld
6	MF	Robin Yalçın	25 January 1994 (aged 17)	(German Football Association) VfB Stuttgart
8	MF	**Emre Can** (c)	12 January 1994 (aged 17)	(German Football Association) Bayern Munich
9	FW	Samed Yeşil	25 May 1994 (aged 16)	(German Football Association) Bayer Leverkusen
10	MF	Levent Ayçiçek	14 February 1994 (aged 17)	(German Football Association) Werder Bremen
11	FW	Patrick Weihrauch	3 March 1994 (aged 17)	(German Football Association) Bayern Munich
12	GK	Cedric Wilmes	13 January 1994 (aged 17)	(German Football Association) Borussia Dortmund
13	DF	**Kaan Ayhan**	10 November 1994 (aged 16)	(German Football Association) Schalke 04
14	FW	Nils Quaschner	22 April 1994 (aged 17)	(German Football Association) Hansa Rostock
15	FW	Okan Aydın	8 May 1994 (aged 16)	(German Football Association) Bayer Leverkusen
16	MF	Sven Mende	18 January 1994 (aged 17)	(German Football Association) VfB Stuttgart
18	MF	Fabian Schnellhardt	12 January 1994 (aged 17)	(German Football Association) 1. FC Köln
21	FW	Erich Berko	6 September 1994 (aged 16)	(German Football Association) VfB Stuttgart
22	DF	Koray Kacinoglu	20 July 1994 (aged 16)	(German Football Association) MSV Duisburg

=== Netherlands ===
Head coach: Albert Stuivenberg

No.	Pos.	Player	Date of birth (age)	Club
1	GK	Boy de Jong	10 April 1994 (aged 17)	(Royal Dutch Football Association) Feyenoord
2	DF	Daan Disveld (c)	20 January 1994 (aged 17)	(Royal Dutch Football Association) NEC
3	DF	**Terence Kongolo**	14 February 1994 (aged 17)	(Royal Dutch Football Association) Feyenoord
4	DF	**Karim Rekik**	2 December 1994 (aged 16)	(Royal Dutch Football Association) Feyenoord
5	DF	**Jetro Willems**	30 March 1994 (aged 17)	(Royal Dutch Football Association) Sparta Rotterdam
6	DF	Kyle Ebecilio	17 February 1994 (aged 17)	(The Football Association) Arsenal
7	FW	Michael Chacón	11 April 1994 (aged 17)	(Royal Dutch Football Association) Heerenveen
8	MF	Yassine Ayoub	6 March 1994 (aged 17)	(Royal Dutch Football Association) Utrecht
9	FW	Anass Achahbar	13 January 1994 (aged 17)	(Royal Dutch Football Association) Feyenoord
10	FW	**Tonny Vilhena**	3 January 1995 (aged 16)	(Royal Dutch Football Association) Feyenoord
11	MF	**Memphis Depay**	13 January 1994 (aged 17)	(Royal Dutch Football Association) PSV
12	FW	**Danzell Gravenberch**	13 January 1994 (aged 17)	(Royal Dutch Football Association) Ajax
13	DF	**Thom Haye**	9 February 1995 (aged 16)	(Royal Dutch Football Association) AZ
14	MF	Joris van Overeem	1 June 1994 (aged 16)	(Royal Dutch Football Association) AZ
15	DF	**Nathan Aké**	18 February 1995 (aged 16)	(Royal Dutch Football Association) Feyenoord
16	GK	Peter Leeuwenburgh	23 March 1994 (aged 17)	(Royal Dutch Football Association) Ajax
17	DF	Menno Koch	7 February 1994 (aged 17)	(Royal Dutch Football Association) PSV
18	FW	Nick de Bondt	21 April 1994 (aged 17)	(Royal Dutch Football Association) Vitesse

=== Romania ===
Head coach: Adrian Vasâi

No.	Pos.	Player	Date of birth (age)	Club
1	GK	Laurențiu Brănescu (c)	30 March 1994 (aged 17)	(Italian Football Federation) Juventus
2	DF	Ionuț Mișu	19 September 1994 (aged 16)	(Romanian Football Federation) Universitatea Craiova
3	DF	Eduard Schuller	19 March 1994 (aged 17)	(Romanian Football Federation) Unirea Alba Iulia
4	DF	Bogdan Mitache	1 January 1994 (aged 17)	(Romanian Football Federation) Viitorul Constanța
5	DF	Adrian Puțanu	9 January 1994 (aged 17)	(Romanian Football Federation) Viitorul Constanța
6	MF	Andrei Vaștag	21 March 1994 (aged 17)	(Romanian Football Federation) LPS Banatul Timișoara
7	MF	**Steliano Filip**	15 May 1994 (aged 16)	(Romanian Football Federation) LPS Banatul Timișoara
8	MF	Bogdan Tîru	15 March 1994 (aged 17)	(Romanian Football Federation) Viitorul Constanța
9	FW	Fabian Himcinschi	30 April 1994 (aged 17)	(Romanian Football Federation) Unirea Alba Iulia
10	MF	**Claudiu Bumba**	5 January 1994 (aged 17)	(Romanian Football Federation) Baia Mare
11	FW	Darius Buia	30 April 1994 (aged 17)	(Romanian Football Federation) LPS Banatul Timișoara
12	GK	George Serban	31 January 1994 (aged 17)	(Romanian Football Federation) Viitorul Constanța
13	DF	Ioan Neag	18 February 1994 (aged 17)	(Romanian Football Federation) Universitatea Cluj
14	MF	Daniel Birău	21 March 1994 (aged 17)	(Romanian Football Federation) LPS Banatul Timișoara
15	FW	Daniel Cristian Paius	24 September 1994 (aged 16)	(Romanian Football Federation) Viitorul Constanța
16	MF	Alin Roman	27 January 1994 (aged 17)	(Romanian Football Federation) LPS Banatul Timișoara
17	DF	Alexandru Petresc	27 April 1994 (aged 17)	(Romanian Football Federation) Mureșul Deva
18	MF	Iulian Roșu	30 May 1994 (aged 16)	(Romanian Football Federation) Steaua II București
