= Pirkis =

Pirkis is a surname. Notable people with the surname include:

- Catherine Louisa Pirkis (1841–1910), English author and animal welfare worker
- Max Pirkis (born 1989), English actor

== See also ==
- Beca Lyne-Pirkis (born 1981), Welsh cook, food writer, and TV presenter
- Piris
