= Jan Filip =

Jan Filip may refer to:

- Jan Filip (footballer) (born 1994), Czech footballer
- Jan Filip (handballer) (born 1973), Czech handballer
- Jan Filip (historian) (1900–1981), Czech prehistorian and archaeologist
- Jan Filip (priest) (1911–1971), Czech Esperantist and author
