= 2016 Club Atlético River Plate season =

Club Atlético River Plate
2016 season
- President: Rodolfo D'Onofrio
- Manager: Marcelo Gallardo
- Stadium: Estadio Monumental Antonio Vespucio Liberti
- Primera División: 9th
- Copa Libertadores: Round of 16
- Recopa: Winners
- Biggest win: River 6–0 The Strongest
- Biggest defeat: Colón 4–1 River
| Home colours | Away colours | Third colours |

The 2016 season is Club Atlético River Plate's 5th consecutive season in the top-flight of Argentine football. The season covers the period from 1 January 2016 to 30 June 2016.

== Season events ==
On February 3, Andrés D'Alessandro signed with River Plate on a one-year loan. It was his return after 13 years to the club in which he was formed and had made his first professional appearance in 2000.

On February 15, River Plate introduced its new home kit for the 2016 season.

On February 25, the team made its debut at the 2016 Copa Libertadores with a 4–0 away win against Trujillanos.

On March 10, River Plate introduced the official away kit for the season. The model was inspired on the one that the club wore on the 1985/86 League, commemorating the 30th anniversary of that tournament won by the club.

On April 5, River Plate introduced an alternative orange uniform, commemorating the 30th anniversary of a 2–0 win against Boca Juniors at La Bombonera, when the team did an olympic turn at the rival's stadium after winning the 1985/86 League. In that match, an orange ball was used due to the white confetti in the field, which made the regular white ball difficult to be seen.

On May 4, River Plate was eliminated from the Copa Libertadores on the Round of 16 despite its 1–0 win at home over Independiente del Valle.

== Squad Summer ==
Note: Flags indicate national team as defined under FIFA eligibility rules; some limited exceptions apply. Players may hold more than one non-FIFA nationality.

| No. | Pos. | Nation | Player |
|---|---|---|---|
| 1 | GK | ARG | Marcelo Barovero (Captain) |
| 2 | DF | ARG | Jonatan Maidana (3rd Captain) |
| 3 | DF | COL | Eder Alvarez Balanta |
| 4 | DF | ARG | Pablo Carreras |
| 5 | MF | ARG | Nicolas Domingo |
| 7 | FW | URU | Rodrigo Mora |
| 8 | MF | ARG | Nicolás Bertolo |
| 10 | MF | ARG | Pity Martínez |
| 13 | FW | ARG | Lucas Alario |
| 14 | MF | ARG | Joaquin Arzura |
| 15 | MF | ARG | Leonardo Pisculichi |
| 16 | MF | ARG | Exequiel Palacios |
| 17 | MF | URU | Tabare Viudez |
| 18 | MF | URU | Camilo Mayada |
| 19 | FW | URU | Ivan Alonso |

| No. | Pos. | Nation | Player |
|---|---|---|---|
| 20 | DF | ARG | Milton Casco |
| 21 | DF | ARG | Leonel Vangioni |
| 22 | MF | ARG | Andres D'Alessandro |
| 23 | MF | ARG | Leonardo Ponzio (Vice-Captain) |
| 24 | DF | ARG | Emanuel Mammana |
| 25 | DF | ARG | Gabriel Mercado |
| 26 | MF | ARG | Ignacio Fernandez |
| 27 | MF | ARG | Lucho Gonzalez |
| 28 | DF | ARG | Leandro Vega |
| 29 | DF | ARG | Gonzalo Montiel |
| 30 | DF | ARG | Luis Olivera |
| 32 | FW | ARG | Sebastián Driussi |
| 33 | GK | ARG | Julio Chiarini |
| 35 | MF | ARG | Tomas Andrade |
| 42 | GK | ARG | Augusto Batalla |

== Transfers ==
=== In ===
| Number | Pos. | Name | From |
|---|---|---|---|
| 5 | MF | (Argentina) Nicolas Domingo | (Argentina) Club Atlético Banfield |
| 14 | MF | (Argentina) Joaquín Arzura | (Argentina) Club Atlético Tigre |
| 19 | FW | (Uruguay) Ivan Alonso | (Uruguay) Club Nacional de Football |
| 26 | MF | (Argentina) Ignacio Fernández | (Argentina) Gimnasia y Esgrima La Plata |
| 35 | MF | (Argentina) Tomas Andrade | (England) AFC Bournemouth |

=== Out ===
| Number | Pos. | Name | To |
|---|---|---|---|
| 5 | MF | (Argentina) Matías Kranevitter | (Spain) Atlético Madrid |
| 8 | MF | (Uruguay) Carlos Andres Sanchez | (Mexico) Club de Fútbol Monterrey |
| 11 | FW | (Argentina) Javier Saviola | Retired |

=== Loan In ===
| Number | Pos. | Name | From |
|---|---|---|---|
| 22 | MF | (Argentina) Andres D'Alessandro | (Brazil) Sport Club Internacional |

=== Loan Out ===
| Number | Pos. | Name | From |
|---|---|---|---|
| 4 | MF | (Argentina) Guido Rodríguez | (Argentina) Defensa y Justicia |
| 14 | MF | (Argentina) Augusto Solari | (Argentina) Estudiantes de La Plata |

== Primera División ==
=== League table ===
Zone 1
| Pos | Team | Pld | W | D | L | GF | GA | GD | Pts | Qualification |
|---|---|---|---|---|---|---|---|---|---|---|
| 7 | Rosario Central | 16 | 5 | 5 | 6 | 19 | 16 | +3 | 20 | |
| 8 | Patronato | 16 | 5 | 5 | 6 | 19 | 23 | −4 | 20 | |
| 9 | River Plate | 16 | 4 | 6 | 6 | 21 | 22 | −1 | 18 | 2017 Copa Libertadores group stage |
| 10 | Sarmiento | 16 | 4 | 5 | 7 | 10 | 18 | −8 | 17 | |
| 11 | Colón | 16 | 5 | 2 | 9 | 21 | 31 | −10 | 17 | |

Source: AFA

== Copa Libertadores ==
Win Draw Loss
