= CEE Cup =

Central & Eastern European Youth Football Tournament
- Founded: 2011
- Teams: 8
- Current champions: (Brazil) Palmeiras
- Most championships: (Brazil) Palmeiras (4 times)
- Website: CEE Cup Official Website

The Central & Eastern European Youth Football Tournament, known as the CEE Cup is an annual invitational under-19 football tournament, which takes place in Czech Republic. The tournament has taken place 10 times, initially restricted to clubs from Central and Eastern Europe - the tournament has now expanded to include teams from Western Europe, Asia, North, South and Central America and Australia.

The tournament has become a staging ground for future footballing talent, such as English Premier League players Tomáš Souček, Dwight McNeil and Anthony Gordon. And German Bundesliga player Joshua Zirkzee.

The trophy is a 3D representation of the tournament's logo, designed and created by Czech blacksmith Martin Blundil - who also designed plaques given to the winners of the individual players awards at the end of each tournament.

== Tournament Format ==
Originally, the tournament began with 4 groups, of 4 teams - with the teams playing each other in a round-robin manner, before the top ranked teams of each group competed in a semi-final and final to determine the winner. Later tournaments however, have reduced to 2 groups of 4 teams - with the group winners taking part in the semi-finals, and the runners-up taking part in matches to determine their final rankings. From the 2022 edition, the competition was limited to 2 groups of 3 teams.

== Tournament Results ==
Dates	Final Stadium	Winner	Score	Runner-up	Other Participant Ranking	Source
25–31 July 2011	Ďolíček, Prague	(Czech Republic) Mladá Boleslav	1–0	(Bulgaria) Levski Sofia	3. (Croatia) RNK Split; 4. (Czech Republic) Bohemians 1905; 5. (Slovakia) Slovan Bratislava; 6. (Romania) Universitatea Cluj; 7. (Czech Republic) FC Slovácko; 8. (Romania) FC Brașov; 9. (Hungary) Vasas; 10. (Slovenia) Krško; 11. (Czech Republic) Sparta Prague; 12. (Slovenia) Triglav	
22–29 July 2012	Ďolíček, Prague	(Czech Republic) Mladá Boleslav	4–3	(Czech Republic) Sparta Prague	3. (Hungary) Vasas; 4. (Bulgaria) Levski Sofia; 5. (Bosnia and Herzegovina) Sarajevo; 6. (Croatia) Hajduk Split; 7. (Hungary) Debreceni; 8. (Austria) Sturm Graz; 9. (Czech Republic) Bohemians 1905; 10. (Slovakia) Spartak Trnava; 11. (Romania) Universitatea Cluj; 12. (Czech Republic) FC Slovácko	
24–31 July 2013	FK Viktoria Stadion, Prague	(Hungary) Győri ETO	2–1	(Czech Republic) Slavia Prague	3. (Hungary) Vasas; 4. (Czech Republic) Sparta Prague; 5. (Bosnia and Herzegovina) Sarajevo; 6. (Slovakia) Slovan Bratislava; 7. (Hungary) Ferencváros; 8. (Mexico) Cruz Azul; 9. (Romania) Universitatea Cluj; 10. (Czech Republic) Bohemians 1905; 11. (Austria) Sturm Graz; 12. (Israel) Maccabi Haifa	
23–30 July 2014	Ďolíček, Prague	(Hungary) Győri ETO	4–3	(Slovakia) AS Trenčín	3. (Bosnia and Herzegovina) Sarajevo; 4. (Germany) FSV Frankfurt; 5. (Hungary) Vasas; 6. (Czech Republic) Sparta Prague; 7. (Serbia) Red Star Belgrade; 8. (Czech Republic) Bohemians 1905; 9. (Czech Republic) Slavia Prague; 10. (Romania) SC Juventus Bucureşti; 11. (Czech Republic) Mladá Boleslav; 12. (Poland) Wisła Kraków	
22–29 July 2015	FK Viktoria Stadion, Prague	(Czech Republic) Sparta Prague	1–1 (7–6 p)	(Brazil) Fluminense	3. (North Macedonia) Akademija Pandev; 4. (Bosnia and Herzegovina) Sarajevo; 5. (Croatia) Hajduk Split; 6. (Slovakia) AS Trenčín; 7. (Poland) Wisła Kraków; 8. (Czech Republic) Bohemians 1905; 9. (Wales) Swansea City; 10. (Czech Republic) Slavia Prague; 11. (Hungary) Vasas; 12. (Australia) Olympic	
21–27 July 2016	Ďolíček, Prague	(Czech Republic) Sparta Prague	4–1	(Brazil) Fluminense	3. (Germany) RB Leipzig; 4. (Brazil) A.A. Ponte Preta; 5. (Bosnia and Herzegovina) Sarajevo; 6. (North Macedonia) Akademija Pandev; 7. (Czech Republic) Slavia Prague; 8. (China) Beijing Renhe; 9. (Hungary) Vasas; 10. (Hungary) Győri ETO; 11. (Slovakia) AS Trenčín; 12. (Czech Republic) Bohemians 1905	
20–26 July 2017	Ďolíček, Prague	(England) Everton	3–1	(England) Burnley	3. (Turkey) Altınordu; 4. (Bosnia and Herzegovina) Sarajevo; 5. (Czech Republic) Sparta Prague; 6. (Czech Republic) Slavia Prague; 7. (North Macedonia) Akademija Pandev; 8. (England) Leicester City; 9. (Slovakia) FC Nitra; 10. (Hungary) Győri ETO; 11. (Canada) ProStars FC; 12. (Romania) Academica Cliceni	
25–31 July 2018	Ďolíček, Prague	(Brazil) Palmeiras	4–0	(Turkey) Beşiktaş	3. (Czech Republic) Slavia Prague; 4. (Bosnia and Herzegovina) Sarajevo; 5. (Czech Republic) Sparta Prague; 6. (England) Everton; 7. (Slovakia) FC Nitra; 8. (Romania) Academica Cliceni	
24–30 July 2019	Ďolíček, Prague	(Brazil) Palmeiras	2–0	(Czech Republic) Sparta Prague	3. (Czech Republic) Slavia Prague; 4. (Croatia) Dinamo Zagreb; 5. (Ukraine) Shakhtar Donetsk; 6. (Turkey) Altınordu; 7. (Turkey) Beşiktaş; 8. (England) Burnley	
22–26 July 2022	Ďolíček, Prague	(Brazil) Palmeiras	2–1	(Czech Republic) Slavia Prague	3. (Ukraine) Dynamo Kyiv; 4. (Czech Republic) Sparta Prague; 5. (Mexico) Tigres; 6. (England) Aston Villa	
28 July–1 August 2023	Ďolíček, Prague	(Brazil) Palmeiras	2–1	(Czech Republic) Slavia Prague	3. (Brazil) Flamengo; 4. (Czech Republic) Sparta Prague; 5. (United Arab Emirates) Al Ain; 6. (England) West Ham United	

== Award Winners ==
Year	Best Goalkeeper	Top Goalscorer	Best Player
2011	(Czech Republic) Petr Nerad (Bohemians 1905)	(Czech Republic) Jan Boček (Mladá Boleslav)	(Bulgaria) Iliev Dimitar (Levski Sofia)
2012	(Czech Republic) Martin Výda (Mladá Boleslav)	(Czech Republic) Ondřej Šíma (Sparta Prague)	(Hungary) Szabolcs Varga (Vasas)
2013	(Czech Republic) Lukáš Soukup (Slavia Prague)	(Hungary) Bence Szabó (Győri ETO)	(Czech Republic) Jiří Sodoma (Slavia Prague)
2014	(Slovakia) Jozef Zemanovič (AS Trenčín)	(Hungary) Milán Májer (Győri ETO)	(Slovakia) Martin Vlček (AS Trenčín)
2015	(Brazil) Jennerson (Fluminense)	(Bosnia and Herzegovina) Hamza Čataković (Sarajevo)	(Czech Republic) Matěj Pulkrab (Sparta Prague)
2016	(Brazil) Rodrigo (A.A. Ponte Preta)	(Brazil) Gustavo (Fluminense)	(Czech Republic) Marian Burda (Sparta Prague)
2017	(England) Adam Bruce (Burnley)	(England) Ellis Simms (Everton)	(England) Anthony Gordon (Everton)
2018	(Brazil) Audenirton (Palmeiras)	(Bosnia and Herzegovina) Đani Salčin (Sarajevo)	(Brazil) Wesley (Palmeiras)
2019	(Ukraine) Mykyta Turbayevskyi (Shakhtar Donetsk)	(Brazil) Fabricio (Palmeiras)	(Czech Republic) Adam Karabec (Sparta Prague)
2022	(Ukraine) Yurii Avramenko (Dynamo Kyiv)	(Mexico) Galvan Peña (Tigres)	(Brazil) Thalys (Palmeiras)
2023	(Czech Republic) Pedro Antonio Rodriguez (Sparta Prague)	(England) Elisha Sowumni (West Ham United)	(Brazil) David Kauã (Palmeiras)

== Performance ==
=== By team ===
Team	Winners	Runners-up	Years won	Years runner-up
(Brazil) Palmeiras	4	–	2018, 2019, 2022, 2023	–
(Czech Republic) Sparta Prague	2	2	2015, 2016	2012, 2013, 2019
(Hungary) Győri ETO	2	–	2013, 2014	–
(Czech Republic) Mladá Boleslav	2	–	2011, 2012	
(England) Everton	1	–	2017	–
(Czech Republic) Slavia Prague	–	3		2013, 2022, 2023
(Brazil) Fluminense	–	2	–	2015, 2016
(Slovakia) AS Trenčín	–	1	–	2014
(Turkey) Beşiktaş	–	1	–	2018
(England) Burnley	–	1	–	2017
(Bulgaria) Levski Sofia	–	1	–	2011

=== By country ===
Country	Winners	Runners-up	Years won	Years runner-up
Czech Republic	4	5	2011, 2012, 2015, 2016	2012, 2013, 2019, 2022, 2023
Brazil	4	2	2018, 2019, 2022, 2023	2015, 2016
Hungary	2	–	2013, 2014	–
England	1	1	2017	2017
Bulgaria	–	1	–	2011
Slovakia	–	1	–	2014
Turkey	–	1	–	2018
