= England national under-17 football team =

National U-17 football team

England U-17
- Nickname: The Young Lions
- Association: The Football Association (The FA)
- Confederation: UEFA (Europe)
- Head coach: Barry Lewtas
- FIFA code: ENG
First colours	Second colours

First international
- England 1–1 Turkey (Livorno, Italy; 20 August 1991)

Biggest win
- England 10–0 New Caledonia (Jakarta, Indonesia; 11 November 2023)

Biggest defeat
- Poland 5–0 England (27 September 2022)

European Championship
- Appearances: 17 (Joint Record) (first in 1984)
- Best result: Champions (2010 and 2014)

FIFA U-17 World Cup
- Appearances: 6 (first in 2007)
- Best result: Champions (2017)
Medal record
Men's football
FIFA U-17 World Cup
Gold medal – first place	2017 India	Team
UEFA European U-17 Championship
Gold medal – first place	2010 Liechtenstein	Team
Gold medal – first place	2014 Malta	Team
Silver medal – second place	2007 Belgium	Team
Silver medal – second place	2017 Croatia	Team
Bronze medal – third place	2002 Denmark	Team
Bronze medal – third place	2011 Serbia	Team
Bronze medal – third place	2018 England	Team

The England national under-17 football team, also known as England under-17s or England U17(s), represents England in football at an under-17 age level and is controlled by The Football Association, the governing body for football in England. They are currently coached by Barry Lewtas.

== Competition history ==
=== FIFA U-17 World Cup ===
England reached the quarter-final stage at both the 2007 FIFA U-17 World Cup and 2011 FIFA U-17 World Cup.

In October 2017, England defeated Spain in the final of the 2017 FIFA U-17 World Cup to become World Champions at this age level for the first time. Phil Foden was awarded the Golden Ball for being the best player at the tournament. Rhian Brewster won the Golden Boot for tournament leading goalscorer and the Bronze ball. England were eliminated during the group stage of the 2019 UEFA European Under-17 Championship and therefore were unable to defend their title at the 2019 FIFA U-17 World Cup in Brazil.

==== Championship record ====
Year	Round	Pld	W	D	L	GF	GA	Squad
(China) 1985	did not enter							
(Canada) 1987	did not enter							
(Scotland) 1989	did not enter							
(Italy) 1991	did not qualify							
(Japan) 1993	did not qualify							
(Ecuador) 1995	did not qualify							
(Egypt) 1997	did not qualify							
(New Zealand) 1999	did not qualify							
(Trinidad and Tobago) 2001	did not qualify							
(Finland) 2003	did not qualify							
(Peru) 2005	did not qualify							
(South Korea) 2007	Quarter-finals	5	3	1	1	12	7	Squad
(Nigeria) 2009	did not qualify							
(Mexico) 2011	Quarter-finals	5	2	2	1	9	6	Squad
(United Arab Emirates) 2013	did not qualify							
(Chile) 2015	Group stage	3	0	2	1	1	2	Squad
(India) 2017	Champions	7	6	1	0	23	6	Squad
(Brazil) 2019	did not qualify							
(Peru) ~~2021~~	Cancelled due to COVID-19 pandemic							
(Indonesia) 2023	Round of 16	4	2	0	2	14	5	Squad
(Qatar) 2025	Round of 16	5	3	0	2	13	8	Squad
(Qatar) 2026	did not qualify							
(Qatar) 2027	To be determined							
(Qatar) 2028	To be determined							
(Qatar) 2029	To be determined							
Total	6/21	29	16	6	7	72	34	

Year	Golden Ball Award
(India) 2017	Phil Foden

=== UEFA European Under-17 Championship ===
The England under-17 team competes in the annual UEFA European Under-17 Championship. England were the hosts of the 2001 Final Tournament, with the English reaching the semi-finals where they lost 4–0 to France on 3 May. They finished fourth, losing the third place play off match 4–1 to Croatia. They finished third at the 2002 UEFA European Under-17 Championship in Denmark. Forward Wayne Rooney was awarded the Golden player accolade. England finished fourth at the 2003 and 2004 tournaments. The 2007 tournament in Belgium saw England finish runners up to Spain, the only goal of the final at the Stade Luc Varenne scored by Bojan Krkić.

England defeated Spain at the 2010 UEFA European Under-17 Championship to become Champions at under-17 level for the first time. Forward Connor Wickham scored the winning goal in the final and was subsequently named Golden player of the tournament. This was the first time England had won a European men's age-group title since their victory at the 1993 UEFA European Under-18 Championship. England won their second title at the 2014 UEFA European Under-17 Championship, defeating the Netherlands in the final on Penalties.

They finished runners up at the 2017 UEFA European Under-17 Championship, losing to Spain in the final on a penalty shoot-out. Forward Jadon Sancho was named Golden player.

The 2018 UEFA European Under-17 Championship was hosted by England. They were eliminated at the semi-final stage by the Netherlands in a penalty shoot-out.

==== Championship record ====
Year	Round	Pld	W	D	L	GF	GA	Squad
(Denmark) 2002	Third Place	6	4	1	1	10	6	Squad
(Portugal) 2003	Fourth place	5	1	3	1	6	6	Squad
(France) 2004	Fourth place	5	3	1	1	11	7	Squad
(Italy) 2005	Group stage	3	1	0	2	6	3	Squad
(Luxembourg) 2006	Elite round	-	-	-	-	-	-	-
(Belgium) 2007	Runners-up	5	3	1	1	8	4	Squad
(Turkey) 2008	Elite round	-	-	-	-	-	-	-
(Germany) 2009	Group stage	3	0	1	2	1	6	Squad
(Liechtenstein) 2010	Champions	5	5	0	0	10	4	Squad
(Serbia) 2011	Semi-final	4	1	1	2	5	5	Squad
(Slovenia) 2012	Elite round	-	-	-	-	-	-	-
(Slovakia) 2013	Elite round	-	-	-	-	-	-	-
(Malta) 2014	Champions	5	4	0	1	10	4	Squad
(Bulgaria) 2015	Quarter-final	4	2	1	1	3	2	Squad
(Azerbaijan) 2016	Quarter-final	4	2	0	2	6	4	Squad
(Croatia) 2017	Runners-up	6	5	0	1	15	4	Squad
(England) 2018	Semi-final	5	3	0	2	6	3	Squad
(Republic of Ireland) 2019	Group stage	3	1	1	1	6	7	Squad
(Estonia) ~~2020~~	Cancelled due to COVID-19 pandemic							
(Cyprus) ~~2021~~	Cancelled due to COVID-19 pandemic							
(Israel) 2022	Elite round	-	-	-	-	-	-	-
(Hungary) 2023	Quarter-final	4	2	1	1	5	2	Squad
(Cyprus) 2024	Quarter-final	4	2	0	2	9	6	Squad
(Albania) 2025	Group stage	3	1	1	1	7	7	Squad
(Estonia) 2026	Did not qualify							
(Latvia) 2027	To be determined							
(Lithuania) 2028	To be determined							
(Moldova) 2029	To be determined							
Total	17/23	74	40	12	22	123	80	

Year	Golden Player Award
(Denmark) 2002	Wayne Rooney
(Liechtenstein) 2010	Connor Wickham
(Croatia) 2017	Jadon Sancho

=== Other tournaments ===
England have also competed at the Nordic tournament and Algarve Tournament.

England host an annual FA international tournament.

== Fixtures and results 2025–26 season ==
Win Draw Loss Fixture

=== 2025 FIFA Under-17 World Cup ===
==== Final tournament ====
4 November 2025 Group stage	England	0–3	Venezuela	Aspire Zone, Al Rayyan
15:00		Report	Davis 40'; Fuentes 45'; Barrios 90+3'	Referee: Filip Dujic (Canada)

7 November 2025 Group stage	England	8–1	Haiti	Aspire Zone, Al Rayyan
12:30	Williams-Barnett 1', 64'; Heskey 14' (pen.); Walsh 21'; Gomes Rodríguez 55'; Ezenwata 58', 69', 80'	Report	Celestin 17'	Referee: Mohammed Al-Shammari (Qatar)

10 November 2025 Group stage	England	3–0	Egypt	Aspire Zone, Al Rayyan
16:00	Heskey 14', 56'; Miles 90'	Report		Referee: Paulo Zanovelli (Brazil)

15 November 2025 Round of 32	England	2–0	South Korea	Aspire Zone, Al Rayyan
16:00	Hui-seop 28' (o.g.); Heskey 35'	Report		Referee: Abdou Mefire (Cameroon)

18 November 2025 Round of 16	England	0–4	Austria	Aspire Zone, Al Rayyan
19:00		Report	Deshishku 47'; Moser 70' (pen.), 79'; Ndukwe 86'	Referee: Faisal Al-Balawi (Saudi Arabia)

=== 2026 UEFA European Under-17 Championship ===
==== Qualification ====
28 October 2025 Qualifying Round	Scotland	1–0	England	Excelsior Stadium, Airdrie
16:30	Douglas 90+5'	Report		Attendance: 617; Referee: Szabolcs Kovacs (Romania)

31 October 2025 Qualifying Round	England	0–1	Lithuania	Broadwood Stadium, Cumbernauld
12:00		Report	Jonyla 17'	Attendance: 131; Referee: Ladislav Szikszay (Czech Republic)

3 November 2025 Qualifying Round	Sweden	5–3	England	Broadwood Stadium, Cumbernauld
16:00	Odefalk 17'; Bardghji 39', 50'; Mehmeti 55', 65'	Report	Madjo 13', 90+3'; Boast 63' (pen.)	Attendance: 96; Referee: Ladislav Szikszay (Czech Republic)

25 March 2026 Qualifying Round League B	England	3–0	Faroe Islands	St George's Park, Burton upon Trent
14:00	Kavuma-McQueen 11', 19'; Higgins 90+1'	Report		Referee: Bálint Kišš (Slovakia)

28 March 2026 Qualifying Round League B	England	1–3	Israel	St George's Park, Burton upon Trent
14:00	Kavuma-McQueen 48'	Report	Didi 34'; Yossef 57'; Dadia 67'	Referee: Oscar Johnson (Sweden)

31 March 2026 Qualifying Round League B	England	2–0	Estonia	St George's Park, Burton upon Trent
14:00	Lamb 69'; Higgins 90'	Report		Referee: Oscar Johnson (Sweden)

== Players ==
=== Latest squad ===
For 2027 UEFA European Under-17 Championship qualification games, players born on or after 1 January 2010 are eligible. Players born between January and August 2010 are first-year scholars in the English academy system, players born from September 2010 to August 2011 will be eligible to enter the full-time academy system at the start of the 2027–28 season.

The following players were named in the squad for qualifying games against Montenegro, Poland and Ukraine, played between 11 and 17 November 2026.

Caps and goals correct as of 4 October 2026, after the match against Germany.

No.	Pos.	Player	Date of birth (age)	Caps	Goals	Club
	GK	Lucca Benetton	8 August 2010 (age 16)	1	0	(The Football Association) Crystal Palace
	GK	Mikel Jack	19 December 2010 (age 15)	1	0	(The Football Association) Tottenham Hotspur
	GK	Charles Phillips	19 September 2010 (age 16)	1	0	(The Football Association) Arsenal
	DF	Theo Carrington	13 June 2010 (age 16)	4	0	(The Football Association) Manchester City
	DF	Emmanuel Fejokwu	29 April 2010 (age 16)	4	0	(Royal Belgian Football Association) Club Brugge
	DF	Josh Henry	10 December 2010 (age 15)	4	1	(The Football Association) Chelsea
	DF	George Jobling	13 May 2010 (age 16)	4	0	(The Football Association) Tottenham Hotspur
	DF	Ayden Minto-St Aimie	30 June 2010 (age 16)	3	0	(The Football Association) Charlton Athletic
	DF	Sam O’Brien	5 January 2010 (age 16)	1	0	(The Football Association) Manchester United
	DF	Noah Smith	21 September 2010 (age 16)	0	0	(The Football Association) Manchester City
	MF	Mahdi Nicoll-Jazuli	6 January 2010 (age 16)	6	2	(The Football Association) Chelsea
	MF	Xavier Parker	9 May 2010 (age 16)	4	1	(The Football Association) Manchester City
	MF	Reggie Watson	26 January 2010 (age 16)	4	1	(The Football Association) Chelsea
	MF	David Eze	8 March 2010 (age 16)	2	0	(The Football Association) Manchester United
	MF	Kwasi Senyah	21 February 2010 (age 16)	1	0	(The Football Association) Tottenham Hotspur
	FW	Oscar Johnson	9 June 2010 (age 16)	4	0	(The Football Association) Aston Villa
	FW	Darren Motsi	11 July 2010 (age 16)	3	1	(The Football Association) Manchester City
	FW	Mylo Bernard	23 February 2010 (age 16)	2	1	(The Football Association) Arsenal
	FW	Josh Blake	24 May 2010 (age 16)	2	1	(The Football Association) Aston Villa
	FW	Joshua Abe	17 July 2010 (age 16)	0	0	(The Football Association) Liverpool
	FW	Vincent Joseph	11 January 2010 (age 16)	0	0	(The Football Association) Arsenal

==== Recent call-ups ====
The following players have previously been called up to the England under-17 squad and remain eligible.

Pos.	Player	Date of birth (age)	Caps	Goals	Club	Latest call-up
GK	Alfie Smith	11 December 2010 (age 15)	1	0	(England) Birmingham City	v Republic of Ireland, Israel, Venezuela, Germany, September–October 2026
DF	Olly Houlihan	11 November 2010 (age 16)	3	0	(England) Manchester City	v Republic of Ireland, Israel, Venezuela, Germany, September–October 2026
DF	Bobby Martin	24 June 2010 (age 16)	3	0	(England) Southampton	v Republic of Ireland, Israel, Venezuela, Germany, September–October 2026
DF	Prince Osifo	-	2	0	(England) Manchester City	v Republic of Ireland, Israel, Venezuela, Germany, September–October 2026
DF	Jacob Dean-Ford	27 October 2010 (age 16)	1	0	(England) Wolverhampton Wanderers	v Republic of Ireland, Israel, Venezuela, Germany, September–October 2026
MF	Hezekiah Grimwade	18 June 2009 (age 17)	4	2	(England) Chelsea	v Republic of Ireland, Israel, Venezuela, Germany, September–October 2026
MF	Mishel Nduka	3 April 2010 (age 16)	4	0	(England) Manchester City	v Republic of Ireland, Israel, Venezuela, Germany, September–October 2026
MF	Toju Wellspring	23 January 2010 (age 16)	3	0	(England) Tottenham Hotspur	v Republic of Ireland, Israel, Venezuela, Germany, September–October 2026
FW	Javahn Woode	8 August 2010 (age 16)	4	0	(England) Manchester City	v Republic of Ireland, Israel, Venezuela, Germany, September–October 2026
FW	Jai Nwosu	3 March 2010 (age 16)	3	1	(England) Brentford	v Republic of Ireland, Israel, Venezuela, Germany, September–October 2026
FW	JJ Gabriel	6 October 2010 (age 16)	2	0	(England) Manchester United	v Faroe Islands, Israel, Estonia, March 2026

== Honours ==
- FIFA U-17 World Cup Winners (1): 2017
- UEFA European Under-17 Championship Winners (2): 2010, 2014
- Syrenka Cup Winners (2): 2018, 2019
- Algarve Tournament Winners (3): 2007–08, 2009–2010, 2011–2012
- Nordic Tournament Winners (2): 2009–2010, 2010–2011
- FA International U17 Tournament Winners (2): 2010–2011, 2011–2012

== Head-to-head record ==
The following table shows England's head-to-head record in the FIFA U-17 World Cup.

Opponent	Pld	W	D	L	GF	GA	GD	Win %
Argentina	1	0	1	0	1	1	+0	0.00
Austria	1	0	0	1	0	4	−4	0.00
Brazil	4	2	0	2	6	5	+1	50.00
Canada	1	0	1	0	2	2	+0	0.00
Chile	1	1	0	0	4	0	+4	100.00
Egypt	1	1	0	0	3	0	+3	100.00
Germany	2	0	0	2	3	7	−4	0.00
Guinea	1	0	1	0	1	1	+0	0.00
Haiti	1	1	0	0	8	1	+7	100.00
Iran	1	1	0	0	2	1	+1	100.00
Iraq	1	1	0	0	4	0	+4	100.00
Japan	1	0	1	0	0	0	+0	0.00
Mexico	1	1	0	0	3	2	+1	100.00
New Caledonia	1	1	0	0	10	0	+10	100.00
New Zealand	1	1	0	0	5	0	+5	100.00
North Korea	1	0	1	0	1	1	+0	0.00
Rwanda	1	1	0	0	2	0	+2	100.00
South Korea	2	1	1	0	2	0	+2	50.00
Spain	1	1	0	0	5	2	+3	100.00
Syria	1	1	0	0	3	1	+2	100.00
United States	1	1	0	0	4	1	+3	100.00
Uruguay	1	1	0	0	2	0	+2	100.00
Uzbekistan	1	0	0	1	1	2	−1	0.00
Venezuela	1	0	0	1	0	3	−3	0.00
Total	29	16	6	7	72	34	+38	55.17
