= Amour Loussoukou =

Congolese footballer

Personal information
- Full name: Junior Amour Loussoukou Ngouala
- Date of birth: 5 December 1996 (age 29)
- Place of birth: Brazzaville, Congo
- Height: 1.78 m (5 ft 10 in)
- Position: Midfielder

Team information
- Current team: Águilas FC

Senior career*
Years	Team	Apps	(Gls)
2014	ACNFF		
2015	CARA Brazzaville		
2016	CSMD Diables Noirs		
2017	CARA Brazzaville		
2018	CSMD Diables Noirs		
2018–2020	Stade Tunisien	26	(0)
2020–	Águilas FC	23	(2)

International career^{‡}
- Congo U17
- Congo U20
2017–	Congo	14	(0)
- * Club domestic league appearances and goals as of 18:26, 4 April 2022 (UTC) ‡ National team caps and goals as of 18:26, 4 April 2022 (UTC)

Junior Amour Loussoukou Ngouala (born 5 December 1996) is a Congolese international footballer who plays as a midfielder for Águilas FC and captains the Congo national team.

== Career ==
Born in Brazzaville, he has played club football for ACNFF, CARA Brazzaville, CSMD Diables Noirs and Stade Tunisien.

At the youth level he played in the 2011 FIFA U-17 World Cup, the 2013 African U-17 Championship and 2015 African U-20 Championship qualifiers. He made his senior international debut for Congo in 2017.
