= Charlevy Mabiala =

Congolese professional footballer (born 1996)

Personal information
- Full name: Charlevy Careem Steeven Mabiala
- Date of birth: 31 March 1996 (age 30)
- Place of birth: Likasi, Congo
- Height: 1.79 m (5 ft 10 in)
- Position: Midfielder

Youth career
- 2012–2015: ACNFF
- 2015–2016: Auxerre

Senior career*
Years	Team	Apps	(Gls)
2015–2017	Auxerre B	47	(0)
2018	Sud Nivernais Imphy Decize	6	(0)
2018-2019	CD Huracan de Balazote	9	(2)

International career
2011	Congo U17	9	(0)
2014–	Congo	4	(0)
- * Club domestic league appearances and goals as of 27 July 2017

Charlevy Mabiala (born 31 March 1996) is a Congolese professional footballer who last played for Auxerre as a midfielder. Mabiala is a youth product of the Congolese club ACNFF.

== International career ==
Mabiala represented the Congo U17s at the 2011 African U-17 Championship and the 2011 FIFA U-17 World Cup. He made his debut for the senior Congo national football team for the 2014 African Nations Championship.
