= Marc Rochester Sørensen =

Danish footballer (born 1992)

Marc Rochester
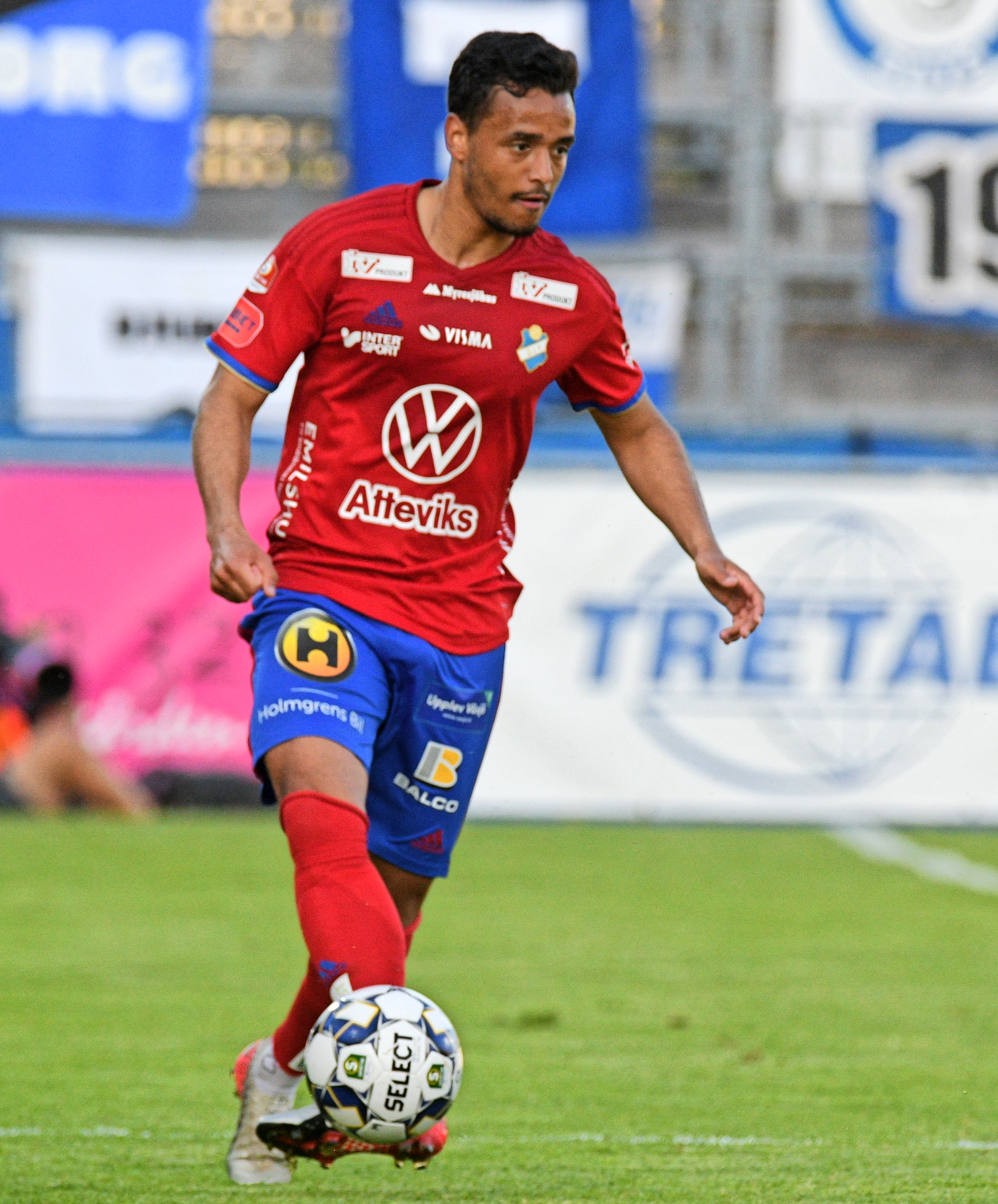

Personal information
- Full name: Marc Rochester Sørensen
- Date of birth: 13 December 1992 (age 33)
- Place of birth: Denmark
- Height: 1.80 m (5 ft 11 in)
- Position: Attacking midfielder

Team information
- Current team: HB Køge
- Number: 8

Senior career*
Years	Team	Apps	(Gls)
2009–2013	HB Køge	46	(4)
2013–2015	FC Vestsjælland	53	(2)
2016–2017	HB Køge	41	(14)
2017–2020	Silkeborg IF	61	(5)
2020–2023	Östers IF	78	(7)
2023–2024	Þór Akureyri	32	(3)
2025–	HB Køge	13	(0)

International career
2011	Denmark U20	9	(12)
- * Club domestic league appearances and goals as of 2 June 2026

Marc Rochester Sørensen (born 13 December 1992) is a Danish footballer who plays as an attacking midfielder for Danish 1st Division side HB Køge.

== Career ==
=== Club career ===
He played 24 matches and scored one goal when HB Køge played in the Danish Superliga in the 2011-12 season.

In 2012, Marc Rochester was selected for the player of year when he played for HB Køge.

In July 2013 he moved to FC Vestsjælland on a 3 years contract. On 20 November 2015 FC Vestsjælland went bankrupt, and on 13 February 2016 Rochester signed a contract with his former club HB Køge.

On February 1, 2025, after a week of training with his former club HB Køge, the Danish 1st Division side confirmed that they had signed Rochester until June 2026.

== Personal life ==
Marc's younger brother, Lee Rochester Sørensen, is also a footballer.
