= Piris =

Piris is a surname. Notable people with the surname include:

- Robert Piris Da Motta (born 1994), Paraguayan footballer
- Iván Piris (born 1989), Paraguayan footballer
- Jorge Piris (born 1990), Argentine footballer
- Lucas Vera Piris (born 1994), Argentine footballer
