= Hardy Binguila =

Congolese professional footballer

Personal information
- Full name: Hardy Alain Samarange Binguila
- Date of birth: 17 July 1996 (age 30)
- Place of birth: Congo
- Height: 1.78 m (5 ft 10 in)
- Position: Midfielder

Team information
- Current team: Diables Noirs
- Number: 10

Youth career
- ACNFF

Senior career*
Years	Team	Apps	(Gls)
2011–2014	ACNFF	74	(10)
2015–2017	Auxerre II	67	(14)
2017–	Tirana	1	(0)
2018-	Diables Noirs	0	(0)

International career^{‡}
2011	Congo U17	9	(4)
2014–	Congo	13	(4)
- * Club domestic league appearances and goals as of 27 July 2017 (UTC) ‡ National team caps and goals as of 31 January 2014

Hardy Binguila (born 17 July 1996) is a Congolese professional footballer, who last played as a midfielder for Tirana. He has also represented Congo national team.

== International career ==
Binguila represented the Congo U17s at the 2011 African U-17 Championship and the 2011 FIFA U-17 World Cup. In January 2014, coach Claude Leroy, invited him to be a part of the Congo squad for the 2014 African Nations Championship. The team was eliminated in the group stages after losing to Ghana, drawing with Libya and defeating Ethiopia. On 13 February 2015 Hardy signed a contract with AJ AUXERRE, a French Ligue 2 club, for 3 years.

=== International goals ===
Scores and results list Congo's goal tally first.

#	Date	Venue	Opponent	Score	Result	Competition
1.	21 January 2014	Free State Stadium, Mangaung, South Africa	Libya	2–0	2–2	2014 African Nations Championship
2.	14 December 2014	Estadio de Bata, Bata, Equatorial Guinea	Chad	1–2	2–3	Friendly
3.	1 September 2015	Stade Municipal de Kintélé, Brazzaville, Republic of Congo	Ghana	2–2	2–3	Friendly
4.	14 November 2015	Addis Ababa Stadium, Addis Ababa, Ethiopia	Ethiopia	1–4	3–4	2018 FIFA World Cup qualification

== Honours ==
=== Club ===
Tirana

- Albanian Supercup: (1) 2017
