= Lucas Vera Piris =

Argentine footballer

Personal information
- Full name: Lucas Leonel Vera Piris
- Date of birth: 2 January 1994 (age 32)
- Place of birth: Lanús, Argentina
- Height: 1.77 m (5 ft 9 1/2 in)
- Position: Midfielder

Team information
- Current team: Argentino

Youth career
- Lanús

Senior career*
Years	Team	Apps	(Gls)
2013–2014	Lanús	0	(0)
2014–2015	Olimpo	1	(0)
2016	Defensa y Justicia	0	(0)
2016–2017	Crucero del Norte	23	(0)
2017–2019	Comunicaciones	55	(5)
2019–2020	Unión Sunchales	11	(0)
2020–	Argentino	0	(0)

International career
- Argentina U15
2011	Argentina U17	2	(0)
- * Club domestic league appearances and goals as of 03:02, 4 October 2020 (UTC)

Lucas Leonel Vera Piris (born 2 January 1994) is an Argentine professional footballer who plays as a midfielder for Argentino.

== Club career ==
Lanús were Vera Piris' first career club, who he began appearing featuring for in 2013. He was initially an unused substitute four times in the Argentine Primera División, prior to making his senior debut in a Copa Argentina tie with UAI Urquiza on 21 March. In August 2014, Vera Piris joined fellow top-flight team Olimpo. He departed in 2015, having made just one appearance. 2016 saw Defensa y Justicia sign Vera Piris, though his spell with them lasted six months after he agreed to join Primera B Nacional's Crucero del Norte. Twenty-three appearances followed during 2016–17 as they were relegated to Primera B Metropolitana.

On 11 August 2017, Comunicaciones of Primera B Metropolitana completed the signing of Vera Piris. He scored his first career goal in his Comunicaciones debut, netting the opening goal of a 0–2 victory against Estudiantes. He subsequently scored three more goals in thirty-two fixtures for them in his first season. After five goals and fifty-five appearances across two seasons, subsequent moves to Unión Sunchales and Argentino followed across 2019 and 2020.

== International career ==
Vera Piris was selected by the Argentina U17s for the 2011 FIFA U-17 World Cup in Mexico. He featured in group matches against Jamaica and Japan as Argentina were knocked out by England at the first knockout round. He had previously played for the Argentina U15s.

== Career statistics ==
As of 4 October 2020.

Club statistics
Club	Season	League			Cup		League Cup		Continental		Other		Total	
Club	Season	Division	Apps	Goals	Apps	Goals	Apps	Goals	Apps	Goals	Apps	Goals	Apps	Goals
Lanús	2012–13	Primera División	0	0	1	0	—		0	0	0	0	1	0
Lanús	2013–14	Primera División	0	0	0	0	—		0	0	0	0	0	0
Lanús	Total		0	0	1	0	—		0	0	0	0	1	0
Olimpo	2014	Primera División	0	0	0	0	—		—		0	0	0	0
Olimpo	2015	Primera División	1	0	0	0	—		—		0	0	1	0
Olimpo	Total		1	0	0	0	—		—		0	0	1	0
Defensa y Justicia	2016	Primera División	0	0	0	0	—		—		0	0	0	0
Crucero del Norte	2016–17	Primera B Nacional	23	0	0	0	—		—		0	0	23	0
Comunicaciones	2017–18	Primera B Metropolitana	32	4	0	0	—		—		0	0	32	4
Comunicaciones	2018–19	Primera B Metropolitana	23	1	0	0	—		—		0	0	23	1
Comunicaciones	Total		55	5	0	0	—		—		0	0	55	5
Unión Sunchales	2019–20	Torneo Federal A	11	0	2	0	—		—		0	0	13	0
Argentino	2020–21	Primera B Metropolitana	0	0	0	0	—		—		0	0	0	0
Career total			90	5	3	0	—		0	0	0	0	93	5
