= Sebastián Canobra =

Uruguayan footballer (born 1994)

Personal information
- Date of birth: 3 November 1994 (age 32)
- Place of birth: Maldonado, Uruguay
- Height: 1.84 m (6 ft 0 in)
- Position: Midfielder

Youth career
- Atenas

Senior career*
Years	Team	Apps	(Gls)
–2016	Atenas	14	(0)
2017–2018	Scherpenheuvel		
- * Club domestic league appearances and goals

Sebastián Andrés Canobra Acosta (born 3 November 1994) is a Uruguayan former footballer who played as a midfielder.

== Career ==
=== Club career ===
Canobra started his career with Uruguayan top flight side Atenas, where he made 14 league appearances and scored 0 goals and suffered relegation to the Uruguayan second tier. On 15 March 2015, Canobra debuted for Atenas during a 2–1 win over Wanderers. In 2017, he signed for Scherpenheuvel in Curaçao.

=== International career ===
He represented Uruguay at the 2011 FIFA U-17 World Cup.
