= Lukáš Stratil =

Czech footballer

Personal information
- Full name: Lukáš Stratil
- Date of birth: 29 January 1994 (age 32)
- Place of birth: Czech Republic
- Height: 1.78 m (5 ft 10 in)
- Position: Forward

Team information
- Current team: Viktoria Plzeň

Youth career
- Baník Ostrava

Senior career*
Years	Team	Apps	(Gls)
2012–2014	Příbram	26	(5)
2014–	Viktoria Plzeň	0	(0)
2014–2015	→ Příbram (loan)	6	(0)
2015	→ Teplice (loan)	0	(0)
2015–2016	→ Frýdek-Místek (loan)	16	(6)
2016	→ Frýdek-Místek (loan)	11	(2)
2017	→ Viktoria Žižkov (loan)	2	(0)

International career^{‡}
2010	Czech Republic U-16	4	(0)
2010–2011	Czech Republic U-17	13	(6)
2012	Czech Republic U-18	2	(0)
2013	Czech Republic U-19	1	(0)
2013	Czech Republic U-20	3	(1)
2013–	Czech Republic U-21	5	(2)
- * Club domestic league appearances and goals as of 2 July 2017 (UTC) ‡ National team caps and goals as of 27 June 2016

Lukáš Stratil (born 29 January 1994) is a Czech football player who currently plays for Viktoria Plzeň. He has represented his country at youth international level.
