= Quentin Beunardeau =

French footballer (born 1994)

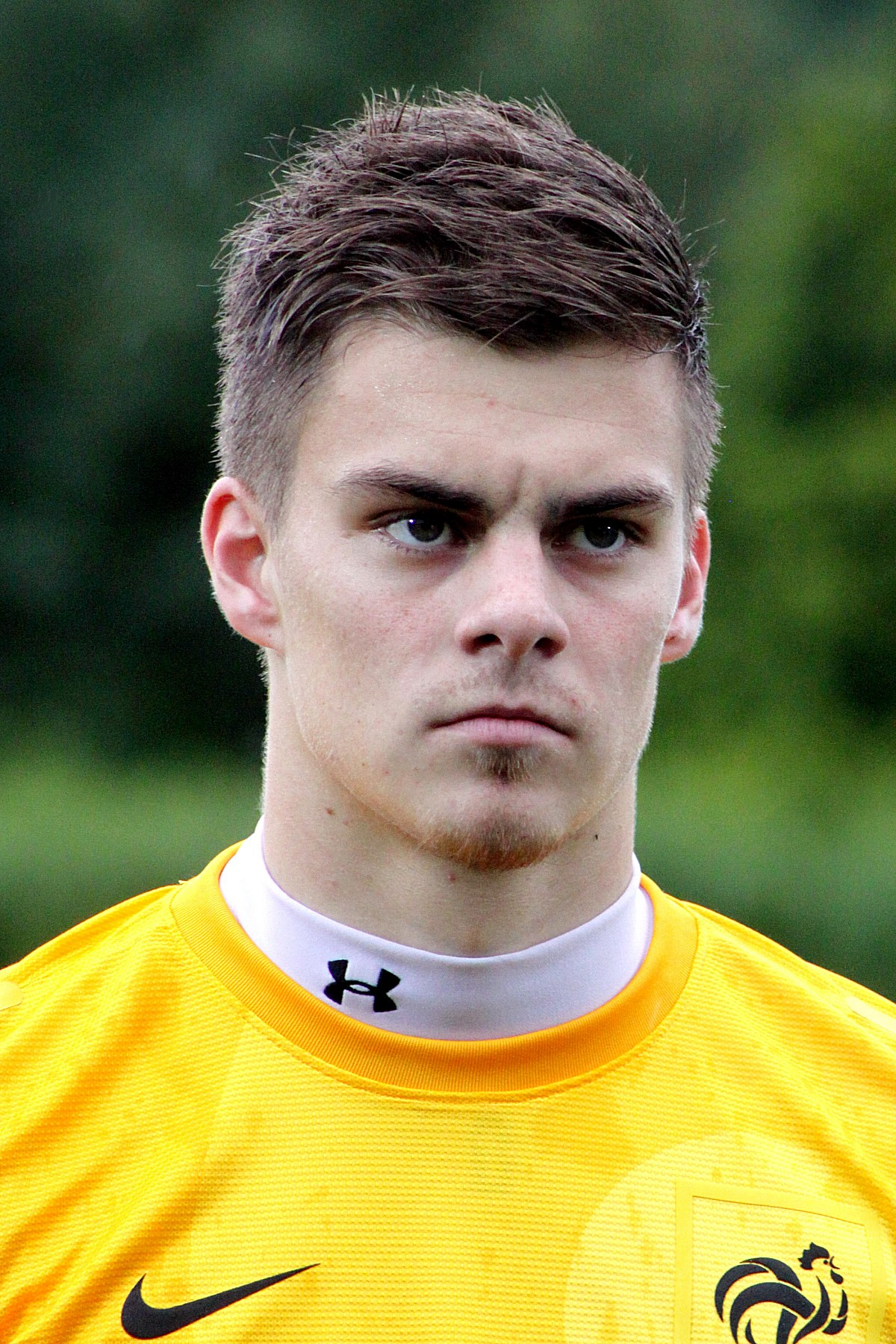
- Beunardeau in 2013 with the France U19 national team

Personal information
- Full name: Quentin Régis Beunardeau
- Date of birth: 27 February 1994 (age 32)
- Place of birth: Le Mans, France
- Height: 1.85 m (6 ft 1 in)
- Position: Goalkeeper

Team information
- Current team: Cannes
- Number: 1

Youth career
- 1999–2004: Stade Olympique du Maine
- 2004–2012: Le Mans

Senior career*
Years	Team	Apps	(Gls)
2010–2013	Le Mans B	30	(0)
2012–2013	Le Mans	5	(0)
2014–2015	Nancy B	23	(0)
2014–2016	Nancy	1	(0)
2015–2016	→ Tubize (loan)	30	(0)
2016–2017	Tubize	60	(0)
2017–2018	Metz B	13	(0)
2017–2018	Metz	1	(0)
2018–2020	Aves	47	(0)
2020–2021	Gil Vicente	1	(0)
2021–2023	Leixões	48	(0)
2023–2026	Red Star	47	(0)
2026–	Cannes	0	(0)

International career
2009–2010	France U16	7	(0)
2010–2011	France U17	14	(0)
2011–2012	France U18	3	(0)
2012–2013	France U19	14	(0)
2013	France U20	3	(0)
- * Club domestic league appearances and goals as of 9 May 2026

Quentin Régis Beunardeau (born 27 February 1994) is a French professional footballer who plays as a goalkeeper for Ligue 3 club Cannes.

== Club career ==
=== Le Mans ===
During the 2012–13 off-season, Beunardeau signed his first professional contract agreeing to a four-year deal. He was, subsequently, promoted to the senior team for the 2012–13 season by manager Denis Zanko. He made his professional debut in the team's opening league match of the 2012–13 campaign; a 2–2 draw against Lens.

=== Nancy ===
In January 2014, following Le Mans's fall to the lower divisions of French football, Beunardeau signed a three-and-a-half-year contract with AS Nancy. He was given the number 1 jersey, and considered third goalkeeper behind Paul Nardi and Damien Grégorini.

== International career ==
Beunardeau is a France youth international having represented his nation at all levels for which he has been eligible. He played with the under-17 team at the 2011 UEFA European Under-17 Football Championship and 2011 FIFA U-17 World Cup.

== Career statistics ==
=== Club ===
As of match played 22 November 2024

Appearances and goals by club, season and competition
Club	Season	League			National cup (Note: Includes Coupe de France, Belgian Cup, Taça de Portugal)		League cup (Note: Includes Coupe de la Ligue, Taça da Liga)		Other		Total	
Club	Season	Division	Apps	Goals	Apps	Goals	Apps	Goals	Apps	Goals	Apps	Goals
Le Mans B	2010–11	CFA	1	0	—		—		0	0	1	0
Le Mans B	2011–12	CFA	10	0	—		—		—		10	0
Le Mans B	2012–13	CFA	19	0	—		—		—		19	0
Le Mans B	Total		30	0	—		—		0	0	30	0
Le Mans	2011–12	Ligue 2	0	0	0	0	0	0	—		0	0
Le Mans	2012–13	Ligue 2	5	0	0	0	0	0	—		5	0
Le Mans	Total		5	0	0	0	0	0	—		5	0
Nancy B	2013–14	CFA 2	9	0	—		—		—		9	0
Nancy B	2014–15	CFA 2	14	0	—		—		—		14	0
Nancy B	Total		23	0	—		—		—		23	0
Nancy	2013–14	Ligue 2	0	0	0	0	0	0	—		0	0
Nancy	2014–15	Ligue 2	1	0	0	0	0	0	—		1	0
Nancy	Total		1	0	0	0	0	0	—		1	0
Tubize (loan)	2015–16	Belgian Second Division	30	0	1	0	—		—		31	0
Tubize	2016–17	Belgian First Division B	30	0	1	0	—		—		31	0
Metz B	2017–18	Championnat National 3	13	0	—		—		—		13	0
Metz	2017–18	Ligue 1	1	0	2	0	0	0	—		3	0
Aves	2018–19	Primeira Liga	26	0	2	0	2	0	1 (Note: Appearance(s) in Supertaça Cândido de Oliveira)	0	31	0
Aves	2019–20	Primeira Liga	21	0	0	0	1	0	—		22	0
Aves	Total		47	0	2	0	3	0	1	0	53	0
Gil Vicente	2020–21	Primeira Liga	1	0	1	0	0	0	—		2	0
Leixões	2021–22	Liga Portugal 2	18	0	0	0	0	0	—		18	0
Leixões	2022–23	Liga Portugal 2	30	0	0	0	2	0	—		32	0
Leixões	Total		48	0	0	0	2	0	—		50	0
Red Star	2023–24	Championnat National	30	0	0	0	—		—		30	0
Red Star	2024–25	Ligue 2	14	0	0	0	—		—		14	0
Red Star	Total		44	0	0	0	—		—		44	0
Career total			273	0	7	0	5	0	1	0	286	0

== Honours ==
Red Star

- Championnat National: 2023–24

Individual

- Liga Portugal 2 Goalkeeper of the Month: August 2022
