= Sven Mende =

German footballer

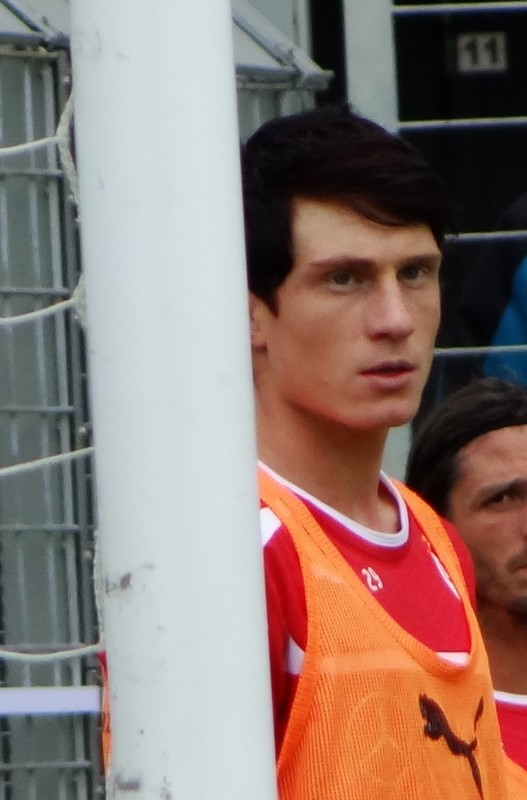
- Mende in 2012

Personal information
- Date of birth: 18 January 1994 (age 32)
- Place of birth: Göppingen, Germany
- Height: 1.86 m (6 ft 1 in)
- Position: Midfielder

Team information
- Current team: 1. CfR Pforzheim
- Number: 18

Youth career
- –2000: TV Jebenhausen
- 2000–2002: VfB Stuttgart
- 2002–2003: SC Geislingen
- 2003–2012: VfB Stuttgart
- 2013: Karlsruher SC

Senior career*
Years	Team	Apps	(Gls)
2012–2013	VfB Stuttgart II	3	(0)
2013–2014	Karlsruher SC II	24	(1)
2014–2015	Hamburger SV II	29	(0)
2015–2016	Wehen Wiesbaden	10	(0)
2016–2021	VfB Lübeck	118	(3)
2021–2022	Schalke 04 II	30	(1)
2022–2024	FC St. Pauli II	34	(0)
2024–	1. CfR Pforzheim	0	(0)

International career
2010	Germany U16	1	(0)
2010–2011	Germany U17	16	(0)
2012	Germany U18	4	(0)
Medal record
Men's football
Representing Germany
European Under-17 Championship
Runner-up	2011
FIFA U-17 World Cup
Bronze medal – third place	2011
- * Club domestic league appearances and goals as of 18 May 2024

Sven Mende (born 18 January 1994) is a German professional footballer who plays as a midfielder for 1. CfR Pforzheim.

== Club career ==
Mende was born in Göppingen.

On 28 July 2012, he made his debut for VfB Stuttgart II in the 3. Liga against Kickers Offenbach as a substitute for Erich Berko.

On 24 January 2013, he moved to Karlsruher SC.

== International career ==
At the 2011 European U-17 Championship and the 2011 FIFA U-17 World Cup Mende played for Germany.
