= Cimo Röcker =

German footballer (born 1994)

Personal information
- Full name: Cimo-Patric Röcker
- Date of birth: 21 January 1994 (age 32)
- Place of birth: Schneverdingen, Germany
- Height: 1.86 m (6 ft 1 in)
- Position: Left-back

Team information
- Current team: Werder Bremen II
- Number: 5

Youth career
- –2008: Jahn Schneverdingen
- 2008–2012: Werder Bremen

Senior career*
Years	Team	Apps	(Gls)
2012–2014	Werder Bremen II	16	(1)
2012–2014	Werder Bremen	0	(0)
2014–2016	Hannover 96 II	14	(0)
2016–2018	Fortuna Köln	27	(1)
2018–2021	Viktoria Berlin	59	(1)
2021–2023	Hertha BSC II	51	(1)
2022	Hertha BSC	1	(0)
2023–	Werder Bremen II	84	(27)

International career
2009	Germany U15	2	(0)
2009–2010	Germany U16	5	(0)
2010–2011	Germany U17	23	(2)
2012	Germany U18	2	(0)
- * Club domestic league appearances and goals as of 22 September 2026

Cimo-Patric Röcker (born 21 January 1994) is a German professional footballer who plays as a left-back for Werder Bremen II.

== Career ==
Röcker made his debut in the Bundesliga on 26 January 2022 in a 3–0 loss against SC Freiburg, coming on as a substitute for the injured Linus Gechter.
