= Lee Rochester Sørensen =

Danish-Jamaican footballer (born 1994)

Personal information
- Date of birth: 30 April 1994 (age 32)
- Place of birth: Nakskov, Denmark
- Height: 1.77 m (5 ft 10 in)
- Position: Forward

Youth career
- Boldklubben Velo
- –2009: Team Lolland
- 2009–2011: HB Køge

Senior career*
Years	Team	Apps	(Gls)
2011–2014	HB Køge	69	(5)
2014–2015	Lyngby	23	(1)
2015	Vestsjælland	9	(2)
2016–2018	HB Køge	83	(17)
2019	Nest-Sotra	13	(4)
2019	Roskilde	2	(0)
2020	Raufoss	17	(1)
Total		216	(30)

International career
2011	Denmark U17	5	(1)
2011–2012	Denmark U18	9	(0)
2012	Denmark U19	3	(0)
2012	Denmark U20	1	(0)
- * Club domestic league appearances and goals

Lee Rochester Sørensen (born 30 April 1994) is a Danish former professional footballer who played as a forward.

== Career ==
Rochester, who is of Danish-English parentage and has roots in Jamaica, started his career in the youth department of Velo. When he was 15, after playing for Team Lolland, he was scouted by HB Køge and eventually joined their football academy.

On 9 April 2010, Rochester made his debut in the Danish 1st Division in a match against Hobro IK, thereby breaking the record of being the youngest player to represent HB Køge, at 16 years old. Rochester signed a three-year contract extension to keep him in Køge until 2015 on 27 June 2011.

On 31 January 2014, Rochester signed a contract with Lyngby Boldklub. But in the summer of 2015, he had his contract canceled, because he was disappointed with the lack of games he has played. On 22 September 2015, Rochester signed a contract with FC Vestsjælland. He made his debut for the club on 23 September in the Danish Cup third round against F.C. Copenhagen. On 4 October he scored his first goal for Vestsjælland in a league match against FC Helsingør. The game ended 3–0, and was the first win for his club in the 2015-16 season. Following FC Vestsjælland's bankruptcy on 30 November 2015 Rochester was without a club. He signed a contract with his former club HB Køge on 13 February 2016.

On 12 January 2019, Rochester signed for Norwegian club Nest-Sotra Fotball. His contract was terminated on 20 August 2019. On the last day of the summer transfer market, 2 September 2019, Rochester returned to Denmark and joined 1st Division club FC Roskilde. He left the club at the end of the year where his contract expired.

In 2020, he shortly played for Norwegian club Raufoss, and did not manage to find a club afterwards, retiring from professional football in 2021.

== Personal life ==
Rochester is of Jamaican descent.

After his professional career, Rochester began a career as a barber, opening his own barber shop in Kongens Lyngby, Hair by Rochester, with his mother Dorte Sørensen.

Lee's older brother Marc plays professional football for Swedish club Östers IF.
