= Pablo Carreras =

Argentine footballer (born 1995)

Personal information
- Full name: Pablo Sebastián Carreras
- Date of birth: 3 March 1995 (age 31)
- Place of birth: Argentina
- Position: Right back

Team information
- Current team: Enosis Neon Paralimni

Senior career*
Years	Team	Apps	(Gls)
2015–2018	River Plate	5	(0)
2016–2018	→ Nueva Chicago (loan)	0	(0)
2018–	Enosis Neon Paralimni	0	(0)
- * Club domestic league appearances and goals as of 25 July 2015

Pablo Sebastián Carreras (born 3 March 1995) is an Argentine footballer who plays as a right back for Enosis Neon Paralimni.

== Club career ==
Carreras made his professional debut for River Plate on 18 July 2015, playing the full 90 minutes of a 5–1 win in that season's Primera División away to Atlético de Rafaela. A week later, he made his only other appearance of the campaign, a 3–1 win over Colón at the Monumental, being substituted for Tabaré Viúdez after 59 minutes.

== International career ==
Carreras represented Argentina at the 2011 South American Under-17 Football Championship and the 2011 FIFA U-17 World Cup.
