= Petr Nerad =

Czech footballer

Personal information
- Date of birth: 6 February 1994 (age 32)
- Place of birth: Czech Republic
- Height: 1.73 m (5 ft 8 in)
- Position: Midfielder

Team information
- Current team: SK Hvozdnice

Youth career
- 1999–2001: Sokol Řepy
- 2002–2012: Bohemians 1905

Senior career*
Years	Team	Apps	(Gls)
2012–2015	Bohemians 1905	56	(7)
2015–2018	Vysočina Jihlava	25	(4)
2016–2017	→ Baník Ostrava (loan)	20	(4)
2018	→ Táborsko (loan)	4	(0)
2019–	SK Hvozdnice		

International career^{‡}
2009–2010	Czech Republic U16	6	(0)
2011	Czech Republic U17	8	(0)
2011–2012	Czech Republic U18	10	(1)
2012–2013	Czech Republic U19	12	(2)
2014–2015	Czech Republic U20	3	(0)
2014	Czech Republic U21	1	(0)
- * Club domestic league appearances and goals as of 00:52, 17 May 2019 (UTC) ‡ National team caps and goals as of 27 December 2014

Petr Nerad (born 6 February 1994) is a Czech professional footballer who currently plays for SK Hvozdnice.

== Career ==
In 2011, during his time at Bohemians 1905, Nerad was named "Goalkeeper of the Tournament" in the inaugural CEE Cup.

=== SK Hvozdnice ===
In the summer 2019, Nerad joined SK Hvozdnice.
