= Patrik Kundrátek =

Czech footballer

Personal information
- Date of birth: 15 February 1994 (age 32)
- Place of birth: Czech Republic
- Height: 1.70 m (5 ft 7 in)
- Position: Midfielder

Team information
- Current team: Baník Ostrava

Senior career*
Years	Team	Apps	(Gls)
2013–	Baník Ostrava	1	(0)

International career
2010–	Czech Republic U17	6	(0)
- * Club domestic league appearances and goals as of 6 February 2014

Patrik Kundrátek (born 15 February 1994) is a Czech football player who plays for FC Baník Ostrava.

Patrik Kundrátek has played international football at under-17 level for Czech Republic U17.
