= Daan Disveld =

Dutch footballer (born 1994)

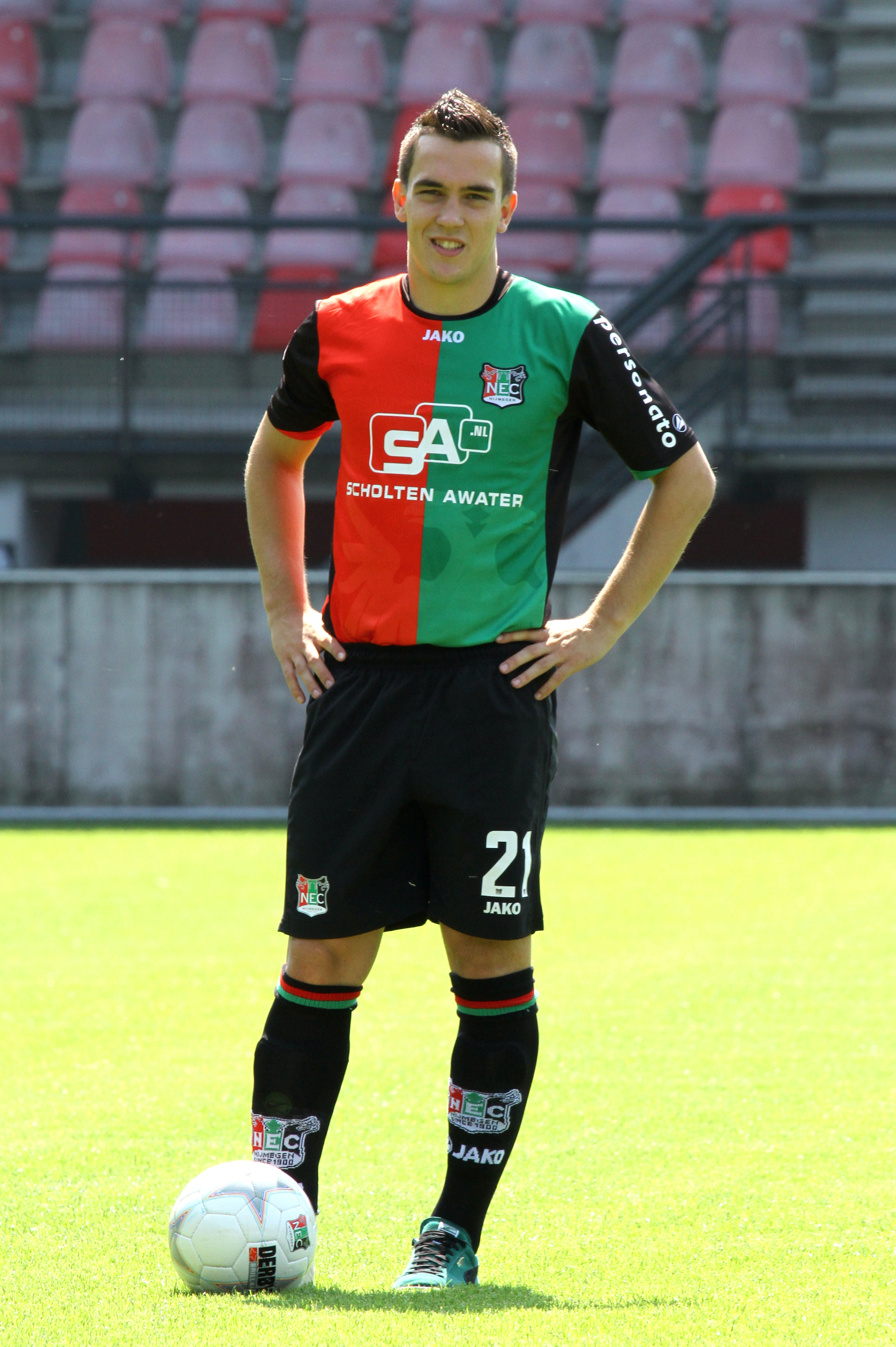

Personal information
- Full name: Daan Disveld
- Date of birth: 20 January 1994 (age 32)
- Place of birth: Lent, Netherlands
- Height: 1.77 m (5 ft 10 in)
- Position: Right back

Team information
- Current team: DVOL

Youth career
- 2005–2011: NEC

Senior career*
Years	Team	Apps	(Gls)
2011–2015	NEC	7	(0)
2015–2017	Den Bosch	13	(0)
2017–2020	TEC	77	(0)
2020–2023	DOVO	5	(0)
2023–2026	Achilles '29		

International career
2010–2011	Netherlands U17	13	(0)
2012	Netherlands U19	3	(0)
Medal record
Men's football
Representing Netherlands
UEFA European Under-17 Championship
Winner	2011 Serbia
- * Club domestic league appearances and goals as of 25 October 2020

Daan Disveld (born 20 January 1994) is a Dutch footballer playing as a right back for amateur side DVOL.

== Club career ==
He joined the youth academy of NEC when he was 5 years old. He was given a 2-year professional contract in April 2011. On 18 January 2013, he extended his contract till 2015. In December 2013, he was included in the squad for a league match against Groningen. He then finally made his debut against the club. Disveld played his second match for NEC in a KNVB Cup match against the same team, but this time NEC lost 5–2. After his expiring contract had not been extended, Disveld signed for two years with Eerste Divisie side FC Den Bosch.

Disveld later resorted to amateur football and played for DOVO and Achilles '29, before joining hometown club DVOL in summer 2026.

== International career ==
He was the captain of the Netherlands U17 team which won the 2011 UEFA European Under-17 Championship after a 5–2 win over Germany U17. Disveld was also included in the Netherlands U19 for UEFA European Under-19 Championship qualifiers in Poland.

== Honours ==
=== Club ===
NEC

- Eerste Divisie (1): 2014–15

=== Country ===
- UEFA European Under-17 Championship (1): 2011
