= Jan Filip (footballer) =

Czech footballer (born 1994)

Personal information
- Date of birth: 6 March 1994 (age 32)
- Place of birth: Czech Republic
- Position: Defender

Team information
- Current team: FK Varnsdorf
- Number: 5

Senior career*
Years	Team	Apps	(Gls)
2013	FK Teplice	0	(0)
2013–	FK Varnsdorf	32	(0)

International career^{‡}
2009–2010	Czech Republic U16	8	(3)
2011	Czech Republic U17	3	(0)
2013	Czech Republic U19	3	(0)
2014–	Czech Republic U20	1	(0)
- * Club domestic league appearances and goals as of 14 September 2015 ‡ National team caps and goals as of 14 September 2015

Jan Filip (born 6 March 1994) is a professional Czech football player who currently plays for FK Varnsdorf.
