= ACNFF =

- Nickname(s): Red Devils
- Website: congo-foot.com

ACNFF (sometimes referred to as AC CNFF) (French: Centre National de Formation de Football) is a Congolese football club and National Training Facility Centre.

ACNFF had more players at the 2007 FIFA U-20 World Cup than any other club.
