= 2011 South American U-17 Championship squads =

Each national team had to present a list of twenty players by 2 March 2011, but each association had the ability to change five players up to five days before the start of the tournament. All the players had to be born after 1 January 1994.

Players name marked in bold have been capped at full international level.

== Argentina ==
Manager: Oscar Garré

No.	Pos.	Player	Date of birth (age)	Club
1	GK	Bruno Galván	8 May 1994 (aged 16)	(Argentina) Boca Juniors
2	DF	Ezequiel Báez	28 June 1994 (aged 16)	(Argentina) Racing
3	DF	Marcos Pinto	25 January 1994 (aged 17)	(Argentina) Lanús
4	DF	Enzo Beloso	20 February 1994 (aged 16)	(Argentina) Newell's Old Boys
5	MF	Gaspar Iñíguez	26 March 1994 (aged 16)	(Argentina) Argentinos Juniors
6	DF	Arian Pucheta	8 March 1995 (aged 15)	(Argentina) Boca Juniors
7	FW	**Lucas Ocampos**	11 July 1994 (aged 16)	(Argentina) River Plate
8	MF	Nahuel Mela	19 March 1994 (aged 16)	(Argentina) River Plate
9	FW	Federico Andrada	3 March 1994 (aged 16)	(Argentina) River Plate
10	MF	**Leandro Paredes**	29 June 1994 (aged 16)	(Argentina) Boca Juniors
11	MF	Brian Ferreira	24 May 1994 (aged 16)	(Argentina) Vélez Sársfield
12	GK	Nicolás Sequeira	30 August 1994 (aged 16)	(Argentina) Lanús
13	DF	Maximiliano Padilla	29 August 1994 (aged 16)	(Argentina) Boca Juniors
14	DF	Alexis Zárate	8 May 1994 (aged 16)	(Argentina) Independiente
15	MF	Pablo Carreras	3 March 1995 (aged 15)	(Argentina) River Plate
16	DF	Jonathan Silva	29 June 1994 (aged 16)	(Argentina) Estudiantes
17	FW	Agustin Allione	28 October 1994 (aged 16)	(Argentina) Vélez Sársfield
18	FW	Lucas Pugh	1 January 1994 (aged 17)	(Argentina) River Plate
19	MF	Leandro Villalba	29 January 1994 (aged 17)	(Argentina) Vélez Sársfield
20	FW	Martín Benítez	17 June 1994 (aged 16)	(Argentina) Independiente

== Bolivia ==
Manager: Douglas Cuenca

No.	Pos.	Player	Date of birth (age)	Club
1	GK	Pedro Galindo	13 April 1995 (aged 15)	(Bolivia) Callejas
2	DF	Alberto Justiniano	24 April 1994 (aged 16)	(Bolivia) Florida
3	DF	**Pablo Pedraza**	10 March 1995 (aged 15)	(Bolivia) Blooming
4	DF	Luis Francisco Rodríguez	22 August 1994 (aged 16)	(Bolivia) Real Cochabamba
5	DF	**Carlos Áñez**	6 July 1995 (aged 15)	(Bolivia) Florida
6	MF	**Pedro Azogue**	6 December 1994 (aged 16)	(Bolivia) Florida
7	MF	Jorge Alpire	16 March 1995 (aged 15)	(Bolivia) Florida
8	MF	**Danny Bejarano**	3 January 1994 (aged 17)	(Bolivia) Naranja M.
9	FW	**Rodrigo Vargas**	19 October 1994 (aged 16)	(Bolivia) Florida
10	MF	Robert Royer Silva	12 February 1994 (aged 17)	(Bolivia) Florida
11	FW	Rodrigo Mejido	6 May 1995 (aged 15)	(Bolivia) Vaca Diez
12	GK	Carlos Navarro	14 May 1994 (aged 16)	(Bolivia) Nacional Potosí
13	MF	Frans Román	25 December 1994 (aged 16)	(Bolivia) Club San Martín
14	DF	Noel Rodríguez	11 January 1995 (aged 16)	(Bolivia) Florida
15	MF	**José Sagredo**	10 March 1994 (aged 16)	(Bolivia) Blooming
16	MF	Carlos Andrés Zabala	19 May 1994 (aged 16)	(Bolivia) Club San Martín
17	MF	Luis Fernando Banegas	21 August 1995 (aged 15)	(Bolivia) Perequije
18	FW	José Muñoz	21 September 1994 (aged 16)	(Bolivia) Bancruz
19	DF	Stalin Taborga	13 February 1994 (aged 16)	(Bolivia) Bolívar
20	FW	Alex Pontons Paz	26 November 1994 (aged 16)	(Italy) AC Milan

== Brazil ==
Manager: Émerson Ávila

No.	Pos.	Player	Date of birth (age)	Club
1	GK	Charles	4 February 1994 (aged 17)	(Brazil) Cruzeiro
2	DF	Wallace	1 May 1994 (aged 16)	(Brazil) Fluminense
3	DF	**Marquinhos**	14 May 1994 (aged 16)	(Brazil) Corinthians
4	DF	Josué	28 January 1994 (aged 17)	(Brazil) Vitória
5	MF	Rodrigo Dourado	17 June 1994 (aged 16)	(Brazil) Internacional
6	DF	Emerson	3 August 1994 (aged 16)	(Brazil) Santos
7	MF	Hernani	27 March 1994 (aged 16)	(Brazil) Atlético Paranaense
8	MF	Marlon Bica	25 May 1994 (aged 16)	(Brazil) Internacional
9	FW	Léo Bonatini	28 March 1994 (aged 16)	(Brazil) Cruzeiro
10	MF	Adryan	10 August 1994 (aged 16)	(Brazil) Flamengo
11	FW	Pedro Paulo	10 February 1994 (aged 17)	(Brazil) Cruzeiro
12	GK	Uilson	28 April 1994 (aged 16)	(Brazil) Atlético Mineiro
13	DF	Matheus Barbosa	18 August 1994 (aged 16)	(Brazil) Grêmio
14	DF	Cláudio Winck	15 April 1994 (aged 16)	(Brazil) Internacional
15	MF	Misael	15 July 1994 (aged 16)	(Brazil) Grêmio
16	MF	Allan	24 February 1994 (aged 16)	(Brazil) São Paulo
17	MF	Guilherme	31 March 1994 (aged 16)	(Brazil) Vasco da Gama
18	MF	Andrigo	27 February 1995 (aged 15)	(Brazil) Internacional
19	FW	Lucas Piazon	20 January 1994 (aged 17)	(Brazil) São Paulo
20	FW	Diego Cardoso	6 March 1994 (aged 16)	(Brazil) Santos

== Chile ==
Manager: George Biehl

No.	Pos.	Player	Date of birth (age)	Club
1	GK	Pablo Jara	2 April 1994 (aged 16)	(Chile) Colo-Colo
2	DF	Rodrigo Moya	25 May 1994 (aged 16)	Universidad de Chile
3	DF	Cristóbal Vergara	20 June 1994 (aged 16)	Universidad de Chile
4	DF	Martín Cortés	17 January 1994 (aged 17)	Universidad de Chile
5	DF	Maximiliano Gálvez	7 January 1994 (aged 17)	(Chile) Cobreloa
6	MF	Jorge González	18 April 1994 (aged 16)	(Chile) Audax Italiano
7	FW	Ariel Páez	20 January 1994 (aged 17)	(Chile) Colo-Colo
8	MF	**Andrés Robles**	7 May 1994 (aged 16)	(Chile) Santiago Wanderers
9	FW	**Ángelo Henríquez**	13 April 1994 (aged 16)	Universidad de Chile
10	MF	**Bryan Rabello**	16 May 1994 (aged 16)	(Chile) Colo-Colo
11	MF	Gerrado Navarrette	14 July 1994 (aged 16)	(Chile) Universidad de Concepción
12	GK	Claudio Abraca	7 January 1994 (aged 17)	(Chile) Palestino
13	DF	**Igor Lichnovsky**	7 March 1994 (aged 16)	Universidad de Chile
14	DF	Narciso Cabrera	28 May 1994 (aged 16)	(Chile) Colo-Colo
15	MF	Rodrigo Quiroga	5 January 1994 (aged 17)	(Chile) Universidad Católica
16	MF	Fabián Manzano	13 January 1994 (aged 17)	(Chile) Universidad Católica
17	FW	Dante Saúl Flores	19 January 1994 (aged 17)	(Chile) O'Higgins
18	FW	Nicolás Palma	4 June 1994 (aged 16)	Universidad de Chile
19	FW	Bastián Crisóstomo	30 May 1994 (aged 16)	(Chile) Colo-Colo
20	MF	Diego Rojas	15 February 1995 (aged 15)	(Chile) Deportes Antofagasta

== Colombia ==
Manager: Ramiro Viafara

No.	Pos.	Player	Date of birth (age)	Club
1	GK	Carlos Mosquera	24 September 1994 (aged 16)	(Colombia) Bogotá FC
2	DF	Jherson Vergara	26 May 1994 (aged 16)	(Argentina) Boca Juniors
3	DF	Jaine Barreiro	19 June 1994 (aged 16)	(Argentina) Boca Juniors
4	MF	Wilver Cuesta	24 July 1994 (aged 16)	(Colombia) La Equidad
5	DF	Esteban Morales	30 November 1994 (aged 16)	(Colombia) CD Alexis García
6	MF	Pedro Osorio	30 April 1994 (aged 16)	(Colombia) Atlético Nacional
7	MF	Mario Álvarez	3 June 1994 (aged 16)	Atlético Colombia
8	MF	Cristian Higuita	12 January 1994 (aged 17)	(Colombia) Deportivo Cali
9	DF	Luis Mena	20 May 1994 (aged 16)	(Colombia) Chicó FC
10	MF	Oswaldo Salgado	7 March 1994 (aged 16)	(Colombia) Real Cartagena
11	FW	Fabián Cuero	7 January 1994 (aged 17)	(Argentina) Independiente
12	GK	Luis Hurtado	24 January 1994 (aged 17)	(Colombia) Deportivo Cali
13	DF	Jerson Mirabent	17 June 1994 (aged 16)	(Colombia) Envigado FC
14	FW	Diego Díaz	2 February 1994 (aged 17)	(Colombia) América de Cali
15	MF	Yuldor Villadiego	14 January 1994 (aged 17)	(Colombia) Sporting FC
16	MF	Eduerdo Meisel	2 March 1994 (aged 16)	(Colombia) Deportivo Pereira
17	MF	Ricardo Delgado Araujo	24 July 1994 (aged 16)	(Colombia) Envigado FC
18	DF	Cristian Palomeque	2 April 1994 (aged 16)	(Colombia) Estudiantil
19	DF	Andres Correa	29 January 1994 (aged 17)	(Colombia) Independiente Medellín
20	FW	Cristian Garcés	10 January 1994 (aged 17)	(Colombia) Deportivo Pereira

== Ecuador ==
Manager: Javier Rodríguez

No.	Pos.	Player	Date of birth (age)	Club
1	GK	Walter Chávez	6 April 1994 (aged 16)	(Ecuador) LDU Quito
2	DF	Cristofer Carlos Suárez	17 September 1994 (aged 16)	(Ecuador) Barcelona
3	DF	**Marlon Mejía**	21 September 1994 (aged 16)	(Ecuador) Emelec
4	DF	Ridder Alcívar	13 March 1994 (aged 16)	(Ecuador) Barcelona
5	MF	Javier Perlaza	15 August 1994 (aged 16)	(Ecuador) Independiente José Terán
6	MF	**Cristian Ramírez**	12 August 1994 (aged 16)	(Ecuador) Independiente José Terán
7	DF	Kevin Mercado	28 January 1994 (aged 17)	(Ecuador) Academia Alfaro Moreno
8	MF	**Jonny Uchuari**	19 January 1994 (aged 17)	(Ecuador) LDU Quito
9	FW	Luis Batioja	16 February 1994 (aged 17)	(Ecuador) LDU Quito
10	MF	**Junior Sornoza**	28 January 1994 (aged 17)	(Ecuador) Independiente José Terán
11	FW	Esteban Troya	18 January 1994 (aged 17)	(Ecuador) ESPOLI
12	GK	Darwin Cuero	15 October 1994 (aged 16)	(Ecuador) El Nacional
13	FW	**Carlos Gruezo**	19 April 1995 (aged 15)	(Ecuador) Independiente José Terán
14	MF	Eddy Roy Corozo	28 June 1994 (aged 16)	(Ecuador) Emelec
15	MF	**José Cevallos Enríquez**	18 January 1995 (aged 16)	(Ecuador) LDU Quito
16	MF	Kevin Emiliano Barzola	9 July 1994 (aged 16)	(Ecuador) Rocafuerte
17	MF	Micheal Arboleda	16 February 1994 (aged 17)	(Ecuador) Independiente José Terán
18	DF	**Gabriel Cortez**	10 October 1995 (aged 15)	(Ecuador) Independiente José Terán
19	DF	Jaime Jordan	28 October 1995 (aged 15)	(Ecuador) Rocafuerte
20	FW	Dennys Fabián Hurtado	22 July 1994 (aged 16)	(Ecuador) Emelec

== Paraguay ==
Manager: Gerardo González Aquino

No.	Pos.	Player	Date of birth (age)	Club
1	GK	Leonardo Machado	8 November 1994 (aged 16)	(Paraguay) Libertad
2	DF	Miller Mareco	31 January 1994 (aged 17)	(Paraguay) Libertad
3	DF	Sebastián Ovelar	5 July 1994 (aged 16)	(Paraguay) Cerro Porteño
4	DF	Carlos González	30 January 1994 (aged 17)	(Paraguay) Cerro Porteño
5	MF	Christian Palacios	19 January 1994 (aged 17)	(Paraguay) Guaraní
6	MF	**Iván Ramírez**	8 December 1994 (aged 16)	(Paraguay) Libertad
7	MF	**Alan Benítez**	25 January 1994 (aged 17)	(Paraguay) Libertad
8	MF	Rodrigo Báez	23 November 1994 (aged 16)	(Paraguay) Olimpia
9	FW	Francisco Vera	21 May 1994 (aged 16)	(Paraguay) Rubio Ñú
10	FW	**Derlis González**	20 March 1994 (aged 16)	(Paraguay) Rubio Ñú
11	FW	Mauro Caballero	8 October 1994 (aged 16)	(Paraguay) Libertad
12	GK	Alejandro Bogado	28 July 1994 (aged 16)	(Paraguay) Guaraní
13	MF	**Robert Piris Da Motta**	25 July 1994 (aged 16)	(Paraguay) Rubio Ñú
14	DF	Pedro Rolón	25 April 1994 (aged 16)	(Paraguay) Libertad
15	FW	Osmar Leguizamón	11 May 1994 (aged 16)	(Paraguay) Villa Rica de Concepción
16	MF	Bladimiro Ojeda	3 February 1994 (aged 17)	(Paraguay) Rubio Ñú
17	MF	Carlos Florenciañéz	9 May 1994 (aged 16)	(Paraguay) Sportivo Luqueño
18	MF	Christian Giménez	4 January 1994 (aged 17)	(Paraguay) Libertad
19	DF	Matías Pérez	4 January 1994 (aged 17)	(Paraguay) Nacional
20	DF	Rodrigo Díaz	13 September 1994 (aged 16)	(Paraguay) Libertad

== Peru ==
Manager: Juan José Oré

No.	Pos.	Player	Date of birth (age)	Club
1	GK	Alejandro Duarte	5 April 1994 (aged 16)	(Peru) Esther Grande
2	DF	**Miguel Araujo**	24 October 1994 (aged 16)	(Peru) Cobresol
3	DF	Wilson Vizconde	9 January 1994 (aged 17)	(Peru) Sporting Cristal
4	DF	**Renato Tapia**	28 July 1995 (aged 15)	(Peru) Esther Grande
5	MF	Yasser Tapullima	27 October 1994 (aged 16)	(Peru) Esther Grande
6	MF	**Pedro Aquino**	13 April 1995 (aged 15)	(Peru) Sporting Cristal
7	DF	Carlo Urquiaga	12 June 1994 (aged 16)	(Peru) Sporting Cristal
8	MF	Pier Larrauri	26 March 1994 (aged 16)	(Peru) Esther Grande
9	DF	Raimo Valles	25 June 1994 (aged 16)	(Peru) Universidad San Martín
10	FW	Alexander Ponce	16 February 1994 (aged 16)	(Peru) Academia Cantolao
11	FW	**Andy Polo**	29 September 1994 (aged 16)	(Peru) Universitario
12	GK	Andy Vidal	23 August 1994 (aged 16)	(Peru) Sporting Cristal
13	DF	Horacio Benincasa	11 April 1994 (aged 16)	(Peru) Esther Grande
14	MF	**Cristian Benavente**	19 May 1994 (aged 16)	(Spain) Real Madrid
15	FW	**Edison Flores**	14 May 1994 (aged 16)	(Peru) Universitario
16	DF	Brayan Arana	21 January 1994 (aged 17)	(Peru) Esther Grande
17	MF	**Raziel García**	15 February 1994 (aged 16)	(Peru) Universidad San Martín
18	MF	Édison Silva	2 May 1994 (aged 16)	(Peru) Sporting Cristal
19	MF	**Wilder Cartagena**	23 September 1994 (aged 16)	(Peru) Alianza Lima
20	DF	Joseph Juárez	16 June 1994 (aged 16)	(Peru) Esther Grande

== Uruguay ==
Manager: Fabián Coito

No.	Pos.	Player	Date of birth (age)	Club
1	GK	Jonathan Cubero	15 January 1994 (aged 17)	(Uruguay) Cerro
2	DF	**Emiliano Velázquez**	30 April 1994 (aged 16)	(Uruguay) Danubio
3	DF	**Gastón Silva**	5 March 1994 (aged 17)	(Uruguay) Defensor Sporting
4	DF	Agustín Tabárez	15 October 1994 (aged 16)	(Uruguay) Nacional
5	MF	Heber Ratti	5 April 1994 (aged 16)	(Uruguay) River Plate
6	DF	Maximiliano Moreira	11 June 1994 (aged 16)	(Uruguay) Nacional
7	MF	Leonardo Pais	7 July 1994 (aged 16)	(Uruguay) Defensor Sporting
8	MF	Elbio Álvarez	13 June 1994 (aged 16)	(Uruguay) Peñarol
9	FW	Sergio Cortelezzi	9 September 1994 (aged 16)	(Uruguay) Nacional
10	MF	Guillermo Méndez	26 August 1994 (aged 16)	(Uruguay) Nacional
11	FW	**Rodrigo Aguirre**	1 October 1994 (aged 16)	(Uruguay) Liverpool
12	GK	Guillermo de Amores	19 October 1994 (aged 16)	(Uruguay) Liverpool
13	FW	Juan Cruz Mascia	3 January 1994 (aged 17)	(Uruguay) Miramar Misiones
14	DF	Santiago Carrera	5 March 1994 (aged 17)	(Uruguay) River Plate
15	DF	Sebastián Gorga	6 April 1994 (aged 16)	(Uruguay) Nacional
16	MF	Maximiliano Poggi	7 January 1994 (aged 17)	(Uruguay) Montevideo Wanderers
17	DF	Gianni Rodríguez	7 June 1994 (aged 16)	(Uruguay) Danubio
18	DF	Sebastián Canobra	3 November 1994 (aged 16)	(Uruguay) Atenas
19	FW	Juan San Martín	15 March 1994 (aged 16)	(Uruguay) Peñarol
20	DF	Alejandro Furia	12 February 1994 (aged 17)	(Uruguay) Peñarol

== Venezuela ==
Manager: Marcos Mathías

No.	Pos.	Player	Date of birth (age)	Club
1	GK	**José Contreras**	20 October 1994 (aged 16)	(Venezuela) Zamora FC
2	DF	Javier Maldonado	9 April 1994 (aged 16)	(Venezuela) Caracas FC
3	DF	César Urpín	14 August 1994 (aged 16)	(Venezuela) Deportivo Anzoátegui
4	DF	Willi Guevara	10 February 1994 (aged 17)	(Venezuela) Deportivo Táchira
5	DF	Carlos Sira	5 January 1994 (aged 17)	(Venezuela) CD Lara
6	MF	Diego Araguainano	22 September 1994 (aged 16)	(Venezuela) Deportivo Anzoátegui
7	MF	**Víctor Hugo García**	11 June 1994 (aged 16)	(Venezuela) Real Esppor
8	MF	José Peraza	14 April 1994 (aged 16)	(Venezuela) Caracas FC
9	FW	**Manuel Arteaga**	17 June 1994 (aged 16)	(Venezuela) Zulia FC
10	FW	**Juan Pablo Añor**	24 January 1994 (aged 17)	(Spain) CF Málaga
11	FW	Omar Perdomo	3 February 1994 (aged 17)	(Venezuela) Trujillanos FC
12	GK	César Rosales	17 November 1994 (aged 16)	(Venezuela) Carabobo FC
13	MF	**Édson Castillo**	18 May 1994 (aged 16)	(Venezuela) Mineros de Guayana
14	FW	Giovanni Dolgetta	18 May 1994 (aged 16)	(Venezuela) Carabobo FC
15	MF	Jesús O'Dell	15 August 1994 (aged 16)	(Venezuela) Sulmona Monagas FC
16	DF	Yalbert Díaz	6 September 1994 (aged 16)	(Venezuela) CD Lara
17	DF	Geovanni Vicenzo	8 February 1994 (aged 17)	(Venezuela) Llaneros de Guanare FC
18	FW	Robert Carvajal	4 February 1994 (aged 17)	(Venezuela) Llaneros de Guanare FC
19	MF	**Renzo Zambrano**	26 August 1994 (aged 16)	(Venezuela) Deportivo Anzoátegui
20	FW	Alejandro González	9 July 1994 (aged 16)	(Spain) Deportivo La Coruña
