= 2013 South American U-20 Championship squads =

The 2013 South American U-20 Championship was an international association football tournament held in Argentina. The ten national teams involved in the tournament were required to register a squad of 22 players; only players in these squads are eligible to take part in the tournament.

Each player had to have been born after 1 January 1993. (Source for player names:)

Players names marked in bold have been capped at full international level.

== Argentina ==
Coach: Marcelo Trobbiani (Argentina)

No.	Pos.	Player	Date of birth (age)	Caps	Goals	Club
1	GK	**Walter Benítez**	January 19, 1993 (aged 19)			(Argentine Football Association) Quilmes
2	DF	Lisandro Magallán (Captain)	September 27, 1993 (aged 19)			(Argentine Football Association) Boca Juniors
3	DF	Carlos Ruiz	December 19, 1993 (aged 19)			(Argentine Football Association) River Plate
4	DF	Alan Aguirre	August 13, 1993 (aged 19)			(Argentine Football Association) Boca Juniors
5	MF	**Matías Kranevitter**	May 21, 1993 (aged 19)			(Argentine Football Association) River Plate
6	DF	Jonathan Valle	January 26, 1993 (aged 19)			(Argentine Football Association) Newell's Old Boys
7	FW	Juan Iturbe	June 4, 1993 (aged 19)			(Portuguese Football Federation) Porto
8	MF	Lucas Romero	April 18, 1994 (aged 18)			(Argentine Football Association) Vélez Sársfield
9	FW	Luciano Vietto	December 5, 1993 (aged 19)			(Argentine Football Association) Racing Club
10	MF	Alan Ruiz	August 19, 1993 (aged 19)			(Argentine Football Association) San Lorenzo
11	MF	Ricardo Centurión	January 19, 1993 (aged 19)			(Argentine Football Association) Racing Club
12	GK	Andrés Mehring	April 19, 1994 (aged 18)			(Argentine Football Association) Colón
13	DF	Lautaro Gianetti	November 13, 1993 (aged 19)			(Argentine Football Association) Vélez Sársfield
14	DF	Lucas Rodríguez	September 27, 1993 (aged 19)			(Argentine Football Association) Argentinos Juniors
15	MF	Agustín Allione	November 28, 1994 (aged 18)			(Argentine Football Association) Vélez Sársfield
16	MF	Marcos Fernández	April 20, 1993 (aged 19)			(Argentine Football Association) Colón
17	MF	**Manuel Lanzini**	February 15, 1993 (aged 19)			(Argentine Football Association) River Plate
18	MF	Federico Cartabia	January 20, 1993 (aged 19)			(Royal Spanish Football Federation) Valencia
19	MF	Juan Cavallaro	June 28, 1994 (aged 18)			(Argentine Football Association) Unión
20	FW	Lucas Melano	March 1, 1993 (aged 19)			(Argentine Football Association) Belgrano
21	DF	Eros Medaglia	September 7, 1994 (aged 18)			(Argentine Football Association) Vélez Sársfield
22	GK	**Juan Musso**	May 6, 1994 (aged 18)			(Argentine Football Association) Racing Club

== Bolivia ==
Coach: Marcelo Barrero (Bolivia)

No.	Pos.	Player	Date of birth (age)	Caps	Goals	Club
1	GK	**Guillermo Viscarra**	February 7, 1993 (aged 19)			(Brazilian Football Confederation) Vitória
2	DF	José Mendoza	May 7, 1994 (aged 18)			(Bolivian Football Federation) Jorge Wilstermann
3	DF	**Carlos Áñez**	July 6, 1995 (aged 17)			(Bolivian Football Federation) Callejas
4	DF	Francisco Rodríguez	August 22, 1994 (aged 18)			(Bolivian Football Federation) Jorge Wilstermann
5	DF	Carlos Paniagua	March 1, 1993 (aged 19)			(Royal Spanish Football Federation) Sevilla
6	MF	**Pedro Azogue**	December 6, 1994 (aged 17)			(Bolivian Football Federation) Oriente Petrolero
7	MF	José Muñóz	September 21, 1994 (aged 18)			(Bolivian Football Federation) Universitario de Sucre
8	FW	Ricardo Vaca	August 21, 1994 (aged 18)			(Royal Spanish Football Federation) Recreativo Huelva
9	FW	Alex Pontons Paz	November 26, 1994 (aged 18)			(Italian Football Federation) Pro Vercelli
10	MF	Robert Silva	February 12, 1994 (aged 18)			(Bolivian Football Federation) Universitario de Sucre
11	MF	Rodrigo Vargas	October 19, 1994 (aged 18)			(Bolivian Football Federation) Oriente Petrolero
12	GK	Diego Zamora	September 12, 1993 (aged 19)			(Bolivian Football Federation) Bolívar
13	DF	Stalin Taborga	February 13, 1994 (aged 18)			(Bolivian Football Federation) Bolívar
14	DF	**Pablo Pedraza**	March 10, 1995 (aged 17)			(Bolivian Football Federation) Blooming
15	DF	Alberto Justiniano	April 24, 1994 (aged 18)			(Bolivian Football Federation) Bolívar
16	MF	**Danny Bejarano**	January 3, 1994 (aged 18)			(Bolivian Football Federation) Oriente Petrolero
17	MF	Carlos Zabala	May 19, 1994 (aged 18)			(Bolivian Football Federation) Blooming
18	MF	Luis Hurtado	September 27, 1993 (aged 19)			(Bolivian Football Federation) Blooming
19	MF	Gerardo Castellón	June 4, 1993 (aged 19)			(Bolivian Football Federation) Ciclón
20	MF	Diego Rodríguez	August 28, 1993 (aged 19)			(Bolivian Football Federation) Oriente Petrolero
21	DF	Silver Revuelta	November 5, 1993 (aged 19)			(Bolivian Football Federation) Blooming
22	GK	Cristian Salinas	November 9, 1993 (aged 19)			(Bolivian Football Federation) Jorge Wilstermann

== Brazil ==
Coach: Emerson Ávila (Brazil)

No.	Pos.	Player	Date of birth (age)	Caps	Goals	Club
1	GK	Gustavo	March 10, 1993 (aged 19)			(Brazilian Football Confederation) Vitória
2	DF	Wallace	May 1, 1994 (aged 18)			(Brazilian Football Confederation) Fluminense
3	DF	Luan	May 10, 1993 (aged 19)			(Brazilian Football Confederation) Vasco da Gama
4	DF	**Dória**	November 8, 1994 (aged 18)			(Brazilian Football Confederation) Botafogo
5	MF	Misael	July 15, 1994 (aged 18)			(Brazilian Football Confederation) Grêmio
6	DF	Mansur	April 17, 1993 (aged 19)			(Brazilian Football Confederation) Vitória
7	MF	Mattheus Oliveira	July 7, 1994 (aged 18)			(Brazilian Football Confederation) Flamengo
8	MF	Adryan	August 10, 1994 (aged 18)			(Brazilian Football Confederation) Flamengo
9	FW	Ademilson	January 9, 1994 (aged 18)			(Brazilian Football Confederation) São Paulo
10	MF	**Felipe Anderson**	April 15, 1993 (aged 19)			(Brazilian Football Confederation) Santos
11	FW	Marcos Júnior	January 19, 1993 (aged 19)			(Brazilian Football Confederation) Fluminense
12	GK	Matheus Vidotto	April 10, 1993 (aged 19)			(Brazilian Football Confederation) Corinthians
13	FW	Bruno Mendes	August 2, 1994 (aged 18)			(Brazilian Football Confederation) Botafogo
14	DF	Samir	December 5, 1994 (aged 18)			(Brazilian Football Confederation) Flamengo
15	DF	Igor Julião	August 23, 1994 (aged 18)			(Brazilian Football Confederation) Fluminense
16	DF	**Douglas Santos**	March 22, 1994 (aged 18)			(Brazilian Football Confederation) Náutico
17	MF	Jadson	August 30, 1993 (aged 19)			(Brazilian Football Confederation) Botafogo
18	MF	Lucas Cândido	December 25, 1993 (aged 18)			(Brazilian Football Confederation) Atlético Mineiro
19	MF	**Fred**	March 5, 1993 (aged 19)			(Brazilian Football Confederation) Internacional
20	MF	**Rafinha**	February 12, 1993 (aged 19)			(Royal Spanish Football Federation) Barcelona
21	FW	**Leandro**	May 12, 1993 (aged 19)			(Brazilian Football Confederation) Grêmio
22	GK	Jordi	September 3, 1993 (aged 19)			(Brazilian Football Confederation) Vasco da Gama

== Chile ==
Coach: Mario Salas (Chile)

No.	Pos.	Player	Date of birth (age)	Caps	Goals	Club
1	GK	Darío Melo	24 March 1994 (aged 18)	13	0	(Football Federation of Chile) Palestino
2	DF	Felipe Campos	8 November 1993 (aged 19)	6	0	(Football Federation of Chile) Palestino
3	DF	Alejandro Contreras	3 March 1993 (aged 19)	1	0	(Football Federation of Chile) Palestino
4	DF	**Valber Huerta**	26 August 1993 (aged 19)	7	0	(Football Federation of Chile) Universidad de Chile
5	DF	**Igor Lichnovsky** (Captain)	7 March 1994 (aged 18)	9	1	(Football Federation of Chile) Universidad de Chile
6	MF	**Sebastián Martínez**	6 June 1993 (aged 19)	8	0	(Football Federation of Chile) Universidad de Chile
7	FW	**Diego Rubio**	15 May 1993 (aged 19)	11	4	(Portuguese Football Federation) Sporting CP
8	DF	**Andrés Robles**	7 May 1994 (aged 18)	5	0	(Football Federation of Chile) Santiago Wanderers
9	FW	**Felipe Mora**	2 August 1993 (aged 19)	1	0	(Football Federation of Chile) Audax Italiano
10	MF	Nicolás Maturana	8 July 1993 (aged 19)	8	1	(Football Federation of Chile) Universidad de Chile
11	MF	Franco Ragusa	22 July 1993 (aged 19)	1	0	(Football Federation of Chile) Everton
12	GK	**Brayan Cortés**	11 March 1995 (aged 17)	0	0	(Football Federation of Chile) Deportes Iquique
13	DF	Manuel Bravo	15 February 1993 (aged 19)	7	0	(Football Federation of Chile) Colo-Colo
14	MF	**Bryan Rabello**	16 May 1994 (aged 18)	14	5	(Royal Spanish Football Federation) Sevilla
15	MF	**Cristián Cuevas**	2 April 1995 (aged 17)	11	3	(Football Federation of Chile) O'Higgins
16	MF	César Fuentes	12 May 1993 (aged 19)	5	0	(Football Federation of Chile) O'Higgins
17	MF	Diego Rojas	15 February 1995 (aged 17)	4	0	(Football Federation of Chile) Universidad Católica
18	FW	**Nicolás Castillo**	14 February 1993 (aged 19)	14	11	(Football Federation of Chile) Universidad Católica
19	DF	Mario Larenas	27 July 1993 (aged 19)	2	0	(Football Federation of Chile) Unión Española
20	MF	**Claudio Baeza**	23 December 1993 (aged 18)	2	0	(Football Federation of Chile) Colo-Colo
21	MF	Ignacio Caroca	2 November 1993 (aged 19)	2	0	(Football Federation of Chile) Colo-Colo
22	GK	Lawrence Vigouroux	19 November 1993 (aged 19)	1	0	(The Football Association) Tottenham Hotspur

== Colombia ==
Coach: Carlos Restrepo (Colombia)

No.	Pos.	Player	Date of birth (age)	Caps	Goals	Club
1	GK	Cristian Bonilla (Captain)	June 2, 1993 (aged 19)			(Colombian Football Federation) Atlético Nacional
2	DF	Jherson Vergara	May 26, 1994 (aged 18)			(Colombian Football Federation) Universitario Popayán
3	DF	Deivy Balanta	February 9, 1993 (aged 19)			(Colombian Football Federation) Alianza Petrolera
4	DF	Andrés Correa	January 29, 1994 (aged 18)			(Colombian Football Federation) Independiente Medellín
5	DF	**Felipe Aguilar**	January 20, 1993 (aged 19)			(Colombian Football Federation) Atlético Nacional
6	MF	José David Leudo	November 9, 1993 (aged 19)			(Argentine Football Association) Estudiantes
7	FW	Mauricio Cuero	January 28, 1993 (aged 19)			(Colombian Football Federation) La Equidad
8	MF	Cristian Higuita	January 12, 1994 (aged 18)			(Colombian Football Federation) Deportivo Cali
9	FW	**Jhon Córdoba**	May 10, 1993 (aged 19)			(Mexican Football Federation) Chiapas
10	MF	**Juan Fernando Quintero**	January 18, 1993 (aged 19)			(Italian Football Federation) Pescara
11	MF	Cristian Palomeque	April 2, 1994 (aged 18)			(Colombian Football Federation) Atlético Nacional
12	GK	Luis Hurtado	January 24, 1994 (aged 18)			(Colombian Football Federation) Deportivo Cali
13	DF	**Helibelton Palacios**	June 11, 1993 (aged 19)			(Colombian Football Federation) Barranquilla
14	MF	**Sebastián Pérez Cardona**	March 29, 1993 (aged 19)			(Colombian Football Federation) Atlético Nacional
15	MF	Juan Nieto	February 25, 1993 (aged 19)			(Colombian Football Federation) Alianza Petrolera
16	MF	Luis Mena	May 20, 1994 (aged 18)			(Colombian Football Federation) Boyacá Chicó
17	FW	Harrison Mojica	February 17, 1993 (aged 19)			(Colombian Football Federation) Deportivo Cali
18	DF	Julián Figueroa	January 29, 1993 (aged 19)			(Colombian Football Federation) Envigado
19	FW	**Miguel Borja**	January 26, 1993 (aged 19)			(Colombian Football Federation) Cortuluá
20	FW	Brayan Perea	February 5, 1993 (aged 19)			(Colombian Football Federation) Deportivo Cali
21	DF	Yair Ibargüen	May 2, 1993 (aged 19)			(Paraguayan Football Association) Olimpia
22	GK	Jair Mosquera	May 2, 1993 (aged 19)			(Colombian Football Federation) Barranquilla

== Ecuador ==
Coach: Julio César Rosero (Ecuador)

No.	Pos.	Player	Date of birth (age)	Caps	Goals	Club
1	GK	Auro Fernandez Parraga	May 7, 1993 (aged 19)			(Ecuadorian Football Federation) Manta
2	DF	**Luis Leon**	April 11, 1993 (aged 19)			(Ecuadorian Football Federation) Independiente José Terán
3	DF	**Marlon Mejía**	September 21, 1994 (aged 18)			(Ecuadorian Football Federation) Emelec
4	DF	Andrés López	February 4, 1993 (aged 19)			(Ecuadorian Football Federation) Deportivo Cuenca
5	MF	Eddy Corozo	June 28, 1994 (aged 18)			(Ecuadorian Football Federation) Emelec
6	DF	**Cristian Ramírez**	August 12, 1994 (aged 18)			(Ecuadorian Football Federation) Independiente José Terán
7	MF	**Carlos Gruezo**	April 19, 1995 (aged 17)			(Ecuadorian Football Federation) Barcelona
8	FW	**José Francisco Cevallos Jr.**	January 18, 1995 (aged 17)			(Ecuadorian Football Federation) LDU Quito
9	FW	Miguel Parrales	December 26, 1995 (aged 16)			(Ecuadorian Football Federation) Manta
10	MF	**Jonny Uchuari**	January 19, 1994 (aged 18)			(Ecuadorian Football Federation) LDU Loja
11	MF	**Jacob Murillo**	March 31, 1993 (aged 19)			(Ecuadorian Football Federation) Olmedo
12	GK	Darwin Cuero	October 15, 1994 (aged 18)			(Ecuadorian Football Federation) El Nacional
13	DF	Luis Ayala	September 24, 1993 (aged 19)			(Ecuadorian Football Federation) Macará
14	DF	**Pedro Velasco**	June 29, 1993 (aged 19)			(Ecuadorian Football Federation) Barcelona
15	MF	Steven Arboleda	February 16, 1994 (aged 18)			(Ecuadorian Football Federation) Independiente José Terán
16	DF	Anderson Ordóñez	January 29, 1994 (aged 18)			(Ecuadorian Football Federation) Barcelona
17	MF	**Junior Sornoza**	January 28, 1994 (aged 18)			(Ecuadorian Football Federation) Independiente José Terán
18	MF	Cristian Oña	January 23, 1993 (aged 19)			(Ecuadorian Football Federation) Independiente José Terán
19	FW	José Gutiérrez	March 3, 1993 (aged 19)			(Ecuadorian Football Federation) LDU Quito
20	FW	Angel Ledesma	June 22, 1993 (aged 19)			(Ecuadorian Football Federation) Macará
21	FW	Ely Esterilla	February 6, 1993 (aged 19)			(Mexican Football Federation) Santos Laguna
22	GK	**Hamilton Piedra**	February 20, 1993 (aged 19)			(Ecuadorian Football Federation) Deportivo Cuenca

== Paraguay ==
Coach: Víctor Genés (Paraguay)

No.	Pos.	Player	Date of birth (age)	Caps	Goals	Club
1	GK	Diego Morel	May 5, 1993 (aged 19)			(Paraguayan Football Association) Libertad
2	DF	Miller Mareco	January 31, 1994 (aged 18)			(Paraguayan Football Association) Libertad
3	DF	Teodoro Paredes	April 1, 1993 (aged 19)			(Paraguayan Football Association) Cerro Porteño
4	DF	**Junior Alonso**	February 11, 1993 (aged 19)			(Paraguayan Football Association) Cerro Porteño
5	DF	**Gustavo Gómez** (Captain)	May 6, 1993 (aged 19)			(Paraguayan Football Association) Libertad
6	MF	**Iván Ramírez**	December 8, 1994 (aged 17)			(Paraguayan Football Association) Libertad
7	MF	Danilo Santacruz	June 12, 1995 (aged 17)			(Paraguayan Football Association) Libertad
8	MF	**Ángel Cardozo**	October 19, 1994 (aged 18)			(Paraguayan Football Association) Rubio Ñu
9	FW	**Cecilio Domínguez**	July 22, 1993 (aged 19)			(Paraguayan Football Association) Sol de América
10	FW	**Derlis González**	May 20, 1994 (aged 18)			(Portuguese Football Federation) Benfica B
11	MF	Rodrigo Alborno	August 12, 1993 (aged 19)			(Italian Football Federation) Novara
12	GK	Alejandro Bogado	July 28, 1994 (aged 18)			(Paraguayan Football Association) Guarani
13	MF	Gustavo Viera	August 28, 1995 (aged 17)			(Paraguayan Football Association) Rubio Ñu
14	DF	Rubén Monges	February 6, 1993 (aged 19)			(Paraguayan Football Association) Libertad
15	MF	**Robert Piris Da Motta**	May 25, 1994 (aged 18)			(Paraguayan Football Association) Rubio Ñu
16	MF	**Miguel Almirón**	November 13, 1994 (aged 18)			(Paraguayan Football Association) Cerro Porteño
17	DF	Jorge Balbuena	June 7, 1993 (aged 19)			(Paraguayan Football Association) Cerro Porteño
18	MF	**Jorge Rojas**	January 7, 1993 (aged 19)			(Paraguayan Football Association) Cerro Porteño
19	DF	Matías Pérez	January 4, 1994 (aged 18)			(Paraguayan Football Association) Nacional
20	FW	Juan Villamayor	June 30, 1993 (aged 19)			(Paraguayan Football Association) Libertad
21	FW	Brian Montenegro	June 10, 1993 (aged 19)			(Paraguayan Football Association) Tacuary
22	GK	Armando Vera	February 4, 1993 (aged 19)			(Paraguayan Football Association) Libertad

== Peru ==
Coach: Daniel Ahmed (Argentina)

No.	Pos.	Player	Date of birth (age)	Caps	Goals	Club
1	GK	Andy Vidal	23 August 1994 (aged 18)			(Peruvian Football Federation) Sporting Cristal
2	DF	Carlos Patrón	30 March 1993 (aged 19)			(Peruvian Football Federation) Universitario de Deportes
3	DF	Marcos Ortiz	27 March 1993 (aged 19)			(Peruvian Football Federation) Sporting Cristal
4	DF	**Renato Tapia**	28 July 1995 (aged 17)			(Peruvian Football Federation) Esther Grande
5	DF	**Miguel Araujo**	24 October 1994 (aged 18)			(Peruvian Football Federation) Sport Huancayo
6	MF	**Hernán Hinostroza**	21 December 1993 (aged 18)			(Royal Belgian Football Association) Zulte Waregem
7	DF	Claudio Torrejón	14 May 1993 (aged 19)			(Peruvian Football Federation) Sporting Cristal
8	MF	Rafael Guarderas	12 September 1993 (aged 19)			(Peruvian Football Federation) Universitario de Deportes
9	FW	**Iván Bulos**	20 May 1993 (aged 19)			(Royal Belgian Football Association) Sint-Truidense
10	FW	**Víctor Cedrón**	6 October 1993 (aged 19)			(Peruvian Football Federation) Universidad César Vallejo
11	FW	**Andy Polo**	29 September 1994 (aged 18)			(Peruvian Football Federation) Universitario de Deportes
12	GK	Ángelo Campos	27 April 1993 (aged 19)			(Peruvian Football Federation) Alianza Lima
13	DF	Diego Chávez	7 March 1993 (aged 19)			(Peruvian Football Federation) Universitario de Deportes
14	FW	**Cristian Benavente**	19 May 1994 (aged 18)			(Royal Spanish Football Federation) Real Madrid
15	MF	**Edison Flores**	15 May 1994 (aged 18)			(Royal Spanish Football Federation) Villarreal B
16	DF	Max Barrios	15 September 1995 (aged 17)			(Peruvian Football Federation) Juan Aurich
17	FW	**Yordy Reyna**	17 September 1993 (aged 19)			(Peruvian Football Federation) Alianza Lima
18	FW	**Jean Deza**	9 June 1993 (aged 19)			(Slovak Football Association) MŠK Žilina
19	MF	**Wilder Cartagena**	23 September 1994 (aged 18)			(Peruvian Football Federation) Alianza Lima
20	DF	**Alexi Gómez**	4 March 1993 (aged 19)			(Peruvian Football Federation) León de Huánuco
21	MF	**Raziel García**	15 February 1994 (aged 18)			(Peruvian Football Federation) Universidad San Martín
22	GK	Patricio Álvarez	24 January 1994 (aged 18)			(Peruvian Football Federation) Universitario de Deportes

== Uruguay ==
Coach: Juan Verzeri (Uruguay)

No.	Pos.	Player	Date of birth (age)	Caps	Goals	Club
1	GK	Jonathan Cubero	January 15, 1994 (aged 18)			(Uruguayan Football Association) Cerro
2	DF	**Emiliano Velázquez**	April 30, 1994 (aged 18)			(Uruguayan Football Association) Danubio
3	DF	**Gastón Silva**	March 5, 1994 (aged 18)			(Uruguayan Football Association) Defensor Sporting
4	DF	**Guillermo Varela**	March 24, 1993 (aged 19)			(Uruguayan Football Association) Peñarol
5	MF	Jim Varela	October 16, 1994 (aged 18)			(Uruguayan Football Association) Peñarol
6	DF	Fabricio Formiliano	January 13, 1993 (aged 19)			(Uruguayan Football Association) Danubio
7	MF	Leonardo País	July 7, 1994 (aged 18)			(Uruguayan Football Association) Defensor Sporting
8	MF	Sebastián Cristóforo	August 23, 1993 (aged 19)			(Uruguayan Football Association) Peñarol
9	FW	**Diego Rolán**	March 24, 1993 (aged 19)			(Uruguayan Football Association) Defensor Sporting
10	FW	Renato César	August 16, 1993 (aged 19)			(Uruguayan Football Association) Nacional
11	MF	**Rodrigo Aguirre**	October 1, 1994 (aged 18)			(Uruguayan Football Association) Liverpool
12	GK	Guillermo de Amores	October 19, 1994 (aged 18)			(Uruguayan Football Association) Liverpool
13	MF	**Diego Laxalt**	February 7, 1993 (aged 19)			(Uruguayan Football Association) Defensor Sporting
14	FW	Gonzalo Bueno	January 16, 1993 (aged 19)			(Uruguayan Football Association) Nacional
15	MF	Matías Abisab	September 10, 1993 (aged 19)			(Uruguayan Football Association) Bella Vista
16	DF	Maximiliano Moreira	November 6, 1994 (aged 18)			(Uruguayan Football Association) Nacional
17	DF	Gianni Rodríguez	June 7, 1994 (aged 18)			(Uruguayan Football Association) Danubio
18	MF	**Giorgian De Arrascaeta**	June 1, 1994 (aged 18)			(Uruguayan Football Association) Defensor Sporting
19	FW	Rubén Bentancourt	March 2, 1993 (aged 19)			(Royal Dutch Football Association) PSV
20	FW	Nicolás López	October 1, 1993 (aged 19)			(Italian Football Federation) Roma
21	GK	Washington Aguerre	April 23, 1993 (aged 19)			(Uruguayan Football Association) Peñarol
22	DF	Maximiliano Amondarain	January 22, 1993 (aged 19)			(Uruguayan Football Association) Progreso

== Venezuela ==
Coach: Marcos Mathias (Venezuela)

No.	Pos.	Player	Date of birth (age)	Caps	Goals	Club
1	GK	**José Contreras**	October 20, 1994 (aged 18)	4	0	(Venezuelan Football Federation) Aragua
2	DF	**Wilker Ángel**	March 18, 1993 (aged 19)	7	0	(Venezuelan Football Federation) Deportivo Táchira
3	DF	Víctor Sifontes	October 21, 1993 (aged 19)	6	0	(Venezuelan Football Federation) Trujillanos
4	MF	**Víctor Hugo García**	June 11, 1994 (aged 18)	7	0	(Venezuelan Football Federation) Real Esppor
5	DF	Gilbert Guerra	April 2, 1993 (aged 19)	5	0	(Venezuelan Football Federation) Yaracuyanos
6	DF	Edwin Peraza	March 11, 1993 (aged 19)	5	0	(Venezuelan Football Federation) Caracas
7	MF	Robert Hernández	February 1, 1994 (aged 18)	5	0	(Venezuelan Football Federation) Deportivo Anzoátegui
8	MF	Robert Garcés	April 5, 1993 (aged 19)	7	0	(Venezuelan Football Federation) Deportivo Anzoátegui
9	FW	**Manuel Arteaga**	June 17, 1994 (aged 18)	6	3	(Italian Football Federation) Parma
10	FW	**Juan Pablo Añor**	January 24, 1994 (aged 18)	0	0	(Royal Spanish Football Federation) Málaga B
11	FW	**Darwin Machís**	February 7, 1993 (aged 19)	0	0	(Royal Spanish Football Federation) Granada
12	GK	Eduardo Herrera	June 6, 1993 (aged 19)	1	0	(Venezuelan Football Federation) Atlético El Vigía
13	DF	Leonardo Terán	March 9, 1993 (aged 19)	5	0	(Venezuelan Football Federation) Caracas
14	DF	Javier Bolívar	May 10, 1993 (aged 19)	6	0	(Venezuelan Football Federation) Tucanes
15	MF	José Peraza	April 14, 1994 (aged 18)	6	0	(Venezuelan Football Federation) Caracas
16	DF	Luis Morgillo	June 15, 1993 (aged 19)	1	0	(Venezuelan Football Federation) Real Esppor
17	FW	**Josef Martínez** (captain)	May 19, 1993 (aged 19)	3	1	(Swiss Football Association) Young Boys
18	MF	**Edson Castillo**	May 18, 1994 (aged 18)	1	0	(Venezuelan Football Federation) Mineros de Guayana
19	FW	José Romo	December 6, 1993 (aged 18)	7	2	(Venezuelan Football Federation) Llaneros
20	MF	**Renzo Zambrano**	August 26, 1994 (aged 18)	7	1	(Venezuelan Football Federation) Monagas
21	FW	Jesús Hernández	January 6, 1993 (aged 19)	7	0	(Venezuelan Football Federation) Deportivo Anzoátegui
22	GK	Luis Lugo	December 17, 1993 (aged 18)	0	0	(Venezuelan Football Federation) Real Esppor
