= Matías Pérez =

Matías Pérez may refer to:

- Matías Pérez García (born 1984), Argentine footballer
- Matías Pérez (footballer, born 1985), Uruguayan footballer
- Matías Rodrigo Pérez (born 1994), Paraguayan footballer
- Matías Pérez Acuña (born 1994), Argentine footballer
- Matías Pérez (footballer, born 1999), Argentine footballer
- Matías Pérez (footballer, born 2005), Chilean footballer
- Matías Pérez (balloonist), Portuguese-born Cuban balloonist
