= Áñez =

Áñez is a Spanish patronymic surname variant of the surname Yáñez. Notable people with the surname include:

- Carlos Áñez (born 1995), Bolivian footballer
- Jeanine Áñez (born 1967), Bolivian politician and lawyer
- Jorge Áñez (1892–1952), Colombian musician, singer, songwriter, and music historian
- Las Áñez, Colombian musical duo, the twins Juanita and Valentina Áñez Rothmann
- Óscar Áñez (born 1990), Bolivian footballer

== See also ==
- Anez Cooper (born 2004), American football player
- Mouhamad Anez (born 1995), Syrian footballer
- Yáñez
