= Gianni Rodríguez =

Uruguayan footballer (born 1994)

Personal information
- Full name: Gianni Daniel Rodríguez Fernández
- Date of birth: 7 June 1994 (age 32)
- Place of birth: Montevideo, Uruguay
- Height: 1.77 m (5 ft 10 in)
- Position: Left back

Team information
- Current team: Cerro

Youth career
- 2010–2012: Danubio

Senior career*
Years	Team	Apps	(Gls)
2012–2013	Danubio	12	(0)
2013–2016	Benfica B	24	(0)
2015–2016	→ Peñarol (loan)	10	(0)
2016–2017	Peñarol	1	(0)
2017	→ Cerro (loan)	20	(0)
2017	Sud América	16	(0)
2018	Fénix	15	(0)
2018–2019	San Martín SJ	9	(0)
2019	Almería	0	(0)
2020	Lori	5	(0)
2020–2021	El Ejido	6	(0)
2021–2022	Villa Teresa	2	(0)
2022	Sud América	23	(1)
2023	Rampla Juniors	17	(0)
2023–2024	Boston River	22	(2)
2025	Deportes Santa Cruz	22	(0)
2026–	Cerro	0	(0)

International career
2009	Uruguay U15	17	(0)
2009–2011	Uruguay U17	41	(2)
2012–2013	Uruguay U20	27	(0)
2011	Uruguay U22	4	(0)
Medal record
Representing Uruguay
Men's Football
Pan American Games
Bronze medal – third place	2011 Mexico	National Team
FIFA U-20 World Cup
Runner-up	2013 Turkey	National Team
South American U-20 Championship
Third place	2013 Argentina	National Team
FIFA U-17 World Cup
Runner-up	2011 Mexico	National Team
South American U-17 Championship
Runner-up	2011 Ecuador	National Team
- * Club domestic league appearances and goals as of 1 February 2026

Gianni Daniel Rodríguez Fernández (born 7 June 1994) is a Uruguayan professional footballer who plays as a left back for Cerro.

== Club career ==
Born in Montevideo, Rodríguez joined the youth system of Danubio F.C. in 2010. In 2012, he joined the senior team, playing 12 matches in 2012–13 Primera División, and 2 matches in 2012 Copa Sudamericana.

In 2013, Rodríguez joined Portuguese club S.L. Benfica, being assigned to the reserve team in Segunda Liga. There, he played 3 matches in the 2012–13 campaign, and 21 matches in 2013–2014. In 2014–15 he was inactive, not being part of the B team.

On 5 February 2015, it was announced that Rodríguez had been loaned to Peñarol. He subsequently represented Cerro, Sud América, Fénix and Argentine side San Martín de San Juan before joining Spanish side UD Almería on 18 July 2019.

On 28 August 2019, however, Rodríguez terminated his contract with the Andalusians after the club's change of ownership.

On 16 February 2020, Armenian Premier League club Lori FC announced the signing of Rodríguez on a one-year contract. He left Lori on 25 September 2020 to join CD El Ejido in Spain on a deal until the end of the season. However, the deal was terminated by mutual agreement in the beginning of January 2021.

In 2025, Rodríguez moved to Chile and signed with Deportes Santa Cruz in the Liga de Ascenso.

Back to Uruguay, Rodríguez joined Cerro in January 2026.

== Honours ==
Uruguay

- FIFA U-17 World Cup: Runner-up 2011
- FIFA U-20 World Cup: Runner-up 2013
