= Marcelo Garcés =

Peruvian footballer (born 2000)

Personal information
- Full name: Marcelo Garcés Gallo
- Date of birth: 8 June 2000 (age 26)
- Place of birth: Lima, Peru
- Position: Forward

Youth career
- Alianza Lima
- Esther Grande
- 2018–2020: Deportivo Municipal

Senior career*
Years	Team	Apps	(Gls)
2019–2021	Deportivo Municipal	4	(0)
- * Club domestic league appearances and goals as of 20:50, 23 December 2021 (UTC)

Marcelo Garcés Gallo (born 8 June 2000) is a Peruvian footballer who plays as a forward.

== Career ==
=== Club career ===
Garcés played for Alianza Lima and Esther Grande in his youth years, before joining Deportivo Municipal in 2018. In the summer 2019, he was promoted to the first team. On 12 October 2019, Garcés got his official in the Peruvian Primera División for Deportivo Municipal against Ayacucho FC. Garcés started on the bench, before replacing Matías Succar in the 81st minute. At the end of November 2021 Deportivo Municipal confirmed, that Garcés would leave the club at the end of the year.
