= Alejandro Duarte =

Peruvian footballer (born 1994)

Personal information
- Full name: Alejandro Christoph Duarte Preuss
- Date of birth: 5 April 1994 (age 32)
- Place of birth: Munich, Germany
- Height: 1.83 m (6 ft 0 in)
- Position: Goalkeeper

Team information
- Current team: Sporting Cristal
- Number: 13

Youth career
- 2004–2007: Academia Frama
- 2007–2010: Esther Grande
- 2010–2011: Bayer Leverkusen
- 2011–2013: Juan Aurich

Senior career*
| Years | Team | Apps | (Gls) |
| 2013–2015 | Juan Aurich | 1 | (0) |
| 2013–2015 | Cienciano | 0 | (0) |
| 2016–2017 | Deportivo Municipal | 2 | (0) |
| 2017–2018 | USMP | 20 | (0) |
| 2018–2019 | BUAP | 1 | (0) |
| 2019–2020 | Zacatepec | 27 | (0) |
| 2020–2021 | Sportivo Luqueño | 3 | (0) |
| 2021– | Sporting Cristal | 57 | (0) |
| 2024 | → Alajuelense (loan) | 0 | (0) |

International career^{‡}
| 2011 | Peru U17 | 3 | (0) |
- * Club domestic league appearances and goals as of 02:39, 4 July 2024 (UTC) ‡ National team caps and goals as of 20:10, 22 November 2022 (UTC)

Alejandro Christoph Duarte Preuss (born 5 April 1994) is a professional footballer who plays as a goalkeeper for Sporting Cristal. Born in Germany, he is a former youth international for Peru.

== Club career ==
Duarte is a product of the youth academies of Academia Frama, Esther Grande, Bayer Leverkusen, and Juan Aurich. He began his senior career with Juan Aurich in 2013, before moving to Cienciano in 2015. The following season, he had a stint with Deportivo Municipal. He moved to Mexico in 2017 with USMP, and his success there led to a move to BUAP where he acted as backup goalkeeper. In 2019, he returned to Peru with Zacatepec, before moving to Paraguay the following season with Sportivo Luqueño. He once more returned to Peru in 2021, signing with Sporting Cristal.

== International career ==
Born in Germany, he played for the Peru U17s at the 2011 South American U-17 Championship. He was first called up to the senior Peru national team in March 2018.

== Personal life ==
Duarte was born in Germany and is of Peruvian descent, and moved to Peru at a young age.

== Honours ==
Sporting Cristal

- Copa Bicentenario: 2021
