= Carlos Florenciañez =

Paraguayan footballer (born 1994)

Personal information
- Full name: Carlos Augusto Junior Florenciañez Vera
- Date of birth: 9 May 1994 (age 32)
- Place of birth: Ciudad del Este, Paraguay
- Height: 1.73 m (5 ft 8 in)
- Position: Midfielder

Team information
- Current team: Oltrepò FBC

Youth career
- 2010: Nacional Asunción

Senior career*
Years	Team	Apps	(Gls)
2010–2012	Sportivo Luqueño	9	(0)
2012–2013	Lanús	0	(0)
2012–2013	→ Lanús B		
2013–2015	Nacional Asunción		
2015	Rubio Ñu	6	(3)
2015	Sol de América	9	(2)
2016–	Rubio Ñu		
- Ponte Preta
2023-	Oltrepò FBC	0	(0)

International career^{‡}
2011	Paraguay U-17	6	(2)
- * Club domestic league appearances and goals as of 6 December 2015 ‡ National team caps and goals as of 19 January 2017

Carlos Augusto Junior Florenciañez Vera, abbreviated to Carlos Florenciañez (born 9 May 1994), is a Paraguayan footballer who plays as a midfielder for Oltrepò FBC.

== Club career ==
Born in Ciudad del Este, Carlos Florenciañez started playing in 2010 with Club Nacional from capital Asunción. That same year he joined Sportivo Luqueño and made his senior debut at the 2010 Paraguayan Primera División season. The following two seasons, 2011 and 2012 he played with Sportivo Luqueño in the Primera División.

In the season 2012–13 he joined Argentinian club Lanús but played only for their B team. He then returned to Paraguay and was Club Nacional player until 2014. In 2015, he played in the 2015 Paraguayan Primera División season, the first half season with Club Rubio Ñu, and second with Club Sol de América.

In January 2016 he was back with Club Rubio Ñu and played till December that year. In January 2017 he went on trials to Europe, to Serbia, to Serbian SuperLiga club Napredak Kruševac.

== International career ==
Florenciañez played with Paraguay team at the 2011 South American Under-17 Football Championship having played in 6 games and scored 2 goals.
