= Brian Ferreira =

Argentine professional footballer

Personal information
- Full name: Brian Federico Ferreira
- Date of birth: 24 May 1994 (age 32)
- Place of birth: Buenos Aires, Argentina
- Height: 1.80 m (5 ft 11 in)
- Position: Attacking midfielder

Youth career
- Vélez Sársfield
- River Plate

Senior career*
Years	Team	Apps	(Gls)
2011–2016	Vélez Sársfield	43	(1)
2016	Olimpo	1	(0)
2016	Independiente II	0	(0)
2017	Johor Darul Ta'zim	5	(1)
2017–2018	Fuerza Amarilla	7	(0)
2018	Coquimbo Unido	12	(1)
2019	PSS Sleman	20	(9)
2020	Madura United	0	(0)
2020–2021	Persela Lamongan	0	(0)
2021–2022	PSIS Semarang	4	(0)
2022–2023	Cafetaleros de Chiapas	0	(0)
2023	Hougang United	9	(0)
2023	La Luz	2	(0)

International career
2011	Argentina U17	11	(2)
Medal record
Men's football
Representing Argentina
South American Under-17 Championship
Bronze medal – third place	2011 Ecuador	Team
- * Club domestic league appearances and goals as of 26 November 2023

Brian Federico Ferreira (born 24 May 1994) is an Argentine professional footballer who plays as an attacking midfielder.

== Club career ==
Brian Ferreira was a product of Velez Sarsfield academy, which produces great players like Carlos Bianchi and Nicolás Otamendi. He was considered as one of the most exciting prospects at Velez, having been promoted to the club's senior team in January 2016.

However, due to his club's worsening financial situation, Ferreira was released as a free agent in September 2016. He then went to Olimpo but failed to impress. He was then quickly loaned to Independiente's reserve team, where he failed to make a single appearance

Having failed to stamp his mark on Argentina, Ferreira moved his footballing career to Asia. His first destination is Johor Darul Ta'zim whom are seeking a direct replacement for outgoing Jorge Pereyra Díaz.

Although Ferreira was born and grew up in Argentina, he currently holds an Iraqi passport and in the 2017 Malaysia Super League season, he was registered as an AFC player as part of the 4 foreign players allowed to be registered per team. As a result, he is eligible to represent Iraq on an international level.

=== PSS Sleman ===
On 1 March 2019, Ferreira signed a one-year contract with Indonesian Liga 1 club PSS Sleman. On 15 May, he made his debut by starting in a 3–1 win against Arema. And he also scored his first goal for the team, he scored in the 2nd minute at the Maguwoharjo Stadium. Ferreira ended his first season at PSS Sleman with 20 appearances and 9 goals in 2019 Liga 1.

=== Persela Lamongan ===
Ferreira was signed for Persela Lamongan to play in Liga 1 in the 2020 season. Ferreira decided to leave Persela after the announcement of the release of the 2021-22 Liga 1 certainty, the decision was revealed through an upload via his personal Instagram account, he was recruited by the team after the 2020 Liga 1 was suspended in the third week due to the COVID-19 pandemic.

=== PSIS Semarang ===
On 7 August 2021, Ferreira signed a one-year contract with Indonesian Liga 1 club PSIS Semarang. On 29 September, he made his league debut by starting in a 0–0 draw against Madura United at the Wibawa Mukti Stadium.

=== Hougang United ===
On 28 January 2023, Hougang United announced the signing of Ferreira for the upcoming Singapore Premier League season. Following a series of poor performances and the club's poor league form, his contract was subsequently terminated to make room for a new foreign signing, that being Djordje Maksimovic.

== International career ==
On international level, Ferreira represented Argentina in the 2011 FIFA U-17 World Cup that was held in Mexico, in which he managed to score an amazing halfway-line goal in a 3–1 defeat against Japan.

== Honours ==
Vélez Sarsfield

- Argentine Primera División: 2012 Inicial, 2012–13 Superfinal
- Supercopa Argentina: 2013

Coquimbo Unido

- Primera B de Chile: 2018

Argentina U-17

- South American Under-17 Championship third place: 2011
