= Yáñez =

Yáñez is a Spanish language patronymic surname derived from the personal name Juan. Notable people with the surname include:

- Adrian Yanez (born 1993), American mixed martial artist
- Agustín Yáñez (1904–1980), Mexican writer and politician
- Bev Yanez (born 1988), American soccer player and former professional player
- Cinthya Yáñez, Bolivian businesswoman and politician minister
- Daniel Yáñez (born 2007), Spanish footballer
- Desideria Quintanar de Yáñez (1814–1893), first woman to join the Church of Jesus Christ of Latter-day Saints in Mexico
- Édgar Ulises Fuentes Yáñez (born 1994), Mexican para-athlete specializing in javelin throw
- Eduardo Yáñez (born 1960) Mexican actor
- Emmanuel Yáñez (born 1985), Uruguayan road cyclist
- Enrique Yáñez (1908–1990), Mexican architect
- Humberto Yáñez Velasco (1897–1952), Chilean lawyer and liberal politician
- Jeronimo Yanez, American police officer who shot Philando Castile
- José Isidro Yáñez (1759–1832), Mexican politician
- José María Yáñez (1803–1880), Mexican war hero of the war of independence from Spain
- Mario Yáñez (born 1993), Mexican squash player
- Patricio Yáñez (born 1961), Chilean footballer
- Puri Yáñez (born 1936) Spanish-born surrealist painter
- René Yañez (1942–2018), Mexican-American artist, curator, and community activist
- Renzo Yáñez (born 1980), Chilean footballer and manager
- Rio Yañez (born 1980), American artist and curator
- Rubén Yáñez (born 1993), Spanish footballer
- Shae Yanez (born 1997), American soccer player
- Vicente Yáñez Pinzón (c.1462–after 1514), Spanish navigator, explorer, and conquistador

== See also ==
- Áñez
