= 2013 South American Youth Football Championship =

Campeonato Sudamericano Sub-20 Juventud de América Argentina 2013

Tournament details
- Host country: Argentina
- Dates: 9 January – 3 February
- Teams: 10 (from 1 confederation)
- Venue: 2 (in 2 host cities)

Final positions
- Champions: Colombia (3rd title)
- Runners-up: Paraguay
- Third place: Uruguay
- Fourth place: Chile

Tournament statistics
- Matches played: 35
- Goals scored: 100 (2.86 per match)
- Attendance: 89,500 (2,557 per match)
- Top scorer: (Uruguay) Nicolás López (6 goals)
- Best player: (Colombia) Juan Fernando Quintero

The 2013 South American Youth Football Championship (Spanish: Campeonato Sudamericano Sub-20 Juventud de América Argentina 2013, Brazilian Portuguese: Campeonato Sul-Americano Sub-20 Juventude da América Argentina 2013) was an association football competition for national under-20 teams in the South America (CONMEBOL). The tournament was held in Argentina from 9 January to 3 February 2013 and was won by Colombia, with Paraguay as runners-up.

Colombia, Paraguay, Uruguay and Chile, which were the first four teams of this tournament qualified for the 2013 FIFA U-20 World Cup to be held in Turkey.

== Host selection ==
Argentina was chosen as host country at a meeting of the CONMEBOL Executive Committee on 18 March 2011 at CONMEBOL headquarters in Luque, Paraguay. At the meeting, it was decided to make Argentina the host nation for both the South American Under-20 and Under-17 tournaments in 2013.

== Teams ==
- Argentina (hosts)
- Bolivia
- Brazil (holder and world champions)
- Chile
- Colombia (winner)
- Ecuador
- Paraguay
- Peru
- Uruguay
- Venezuela

== Venues ==
A total of two cities hosted the tournament.

Mendoza	2013 South American Youth Football Championship is located in Argentina
Estadio Malvinas Argentinas	2013 South American Youth Football Championship is located in Argentina
Capacity: 40,268	2013 South American Youth Football Championship is located in Argentina
San Juan	2013 South American Youth Football Championship is located in Argentina
Estadio del Bicentenario	2013 South American Youth Football Championship is located in Argentina
Capacity: 25,000	2013 South American Youth Football Championship is located in Argentina

== Match officials ==
The referees were:

- (Argentina) Patricio Loustau
  Assistant: Diego Bonfá
- (Bolivia) Raúl Orosco
  Assistant: Wilson Arellano
- (Brazil) Sandro Ricci
  Assistant: Marcelo Van Gasse
- (Chile) Julio Bascuñán
  Assistant: Carlos Astroza
- (Colombia) José Hernando Buitrago
  Assistant: Wilmar Navarro
- (Ecuador) Carlos Vera
  Assistant: Byron Romero
- (Paraguay) Enrique Cáceres
  Assistant: Darío Gaona
- (Peru) Víctor Hugo Carrillo
  Assistant: Raúl López
- (Uruguay) Daniel Fedorczuk
  Assistant: Nicolás Tarán
- (Venezuela) Marlon Escalante
  Assistant: Carlos López

== First stage ==
When teams finished level of points, the final order was determined according to:

1. superior goal difference in all matches
2. greater number of goals scored in all group matches
3. better result in matches between the tied teams
4. drawing of lots

All match times are in local Argentine time (UTC−03:00).

=== Group A ===
Team	Pld	W	D	L	GF	GA	GD	Pts
Chile	4	4	0	0	8	3	+5	12
Colombia	4	2	0	2	10	5	+5	6
Paraguay	4	2	0	2	9	6	+3	6
Argentina	4	1	1	2	6	7	−1	4
Bolivia	4	0	1	3	3	15	−12	1

9 January 2013
20:00

Paraguay	0–1	Colombia
	Report	Córdoba 35'

Estadio Malvinas Argentinas, Mendoza
Attendance: 3,000
Referee: Carlos Vera (Ecuador)
9 January 2013
22:15

Argentina	0–1	Chile
	Report	Castillo 21'

Estadio Malvinas Argentinas, Mendoza
Attendance: 30,000
Referee: Sandro Ricci (Brazil)

11 January 2013
20:00

Argentina	1–2	Paraguay
Vietto 37'	Report	González 60'; Domínguez 67'

Estadio Malvinas Argentinas, Mendoza
Attendance: 20,000
Referee: Víctor Hugo Carrillo (Peru)
11 January 2013
22:15

Chile	2–0	Bolivia
Castillo 54'; Cuevas 93'	Report

Estadio Malvinas Argentinas, Mendoza
Attendance: 5,000
Referee: Marlon Escalante (Venezuela)

13 January 2013
14:45

Chile	2–1	Colombia
Cuevas 6'; Lichnovsky 31'	Report	Quintero 83' (pen.)

Estadio Malvinas Argentinas, Mendoza
Attendance: 10,000
Referee: Carlos Vera (Ecuador)
13 January 2013
20:00

Argentina	2–2	Bolivia
Melano 48'; Vietto 65'	Report	Bejarano 12'; Vargas 87' (pen.)

Estadio Malvinas Argentinas, Mendoza
Attendance: 13,000
Referee: Daniel Fedorczuk (Uruguay)

15 January 2013
20:00

Paraguay	2–3	Chile
González 8'; Alborno 54'	Report	Rojas 23'; Maturana 37'; Contreras 90+1'

Estadio Malvinas Argentinas, Mendoza
Attendance: 7,000
Referee: Marlon Escalante (Venezuela)
15 January 2013
22:15

Colombia	6–0	Bolivia
Borja 45', 52', 57'; Nieto 50'; Córdoba 75', 86'	Report

Estadio Malvinas Argentinas, Mendoza
Attendance: 3,000
Referee: Sandro Ricci (Brazil)

17 January 2013
17:45

Paraguay	5–1	Bolivia
Gómez 8'; González 31'; Pérez 62', 64'; Rojas 68'	Report	Vargas 57'

Estadio Malvinas Argentinas, Mendoza
Attendance: 1,000
Referee: Daniel Fedorczuk (Uruguay)
17 January 2013
20:00

Argentina	3–2	Colombia
Ruiz 13' (pen.); Iturbe 46'; Allione 69'	Report	Perea 50'; Quintero 74'

Estadio Malvinas Argentinas, Mendoza
Attendance: 8,000
Referee: Víctor Hugo Carrillo (Peru)

=== Group B ===
Team	Pld	W	D	L	GF	GA	GD	Pts
Peru	4	2	1	1	7	5	+2	7
Uruguay	4	1	3	0	10	9	+1	6
Ecuador	4	1	2	1	5	5	0	5
Venezuela	4	1	1	2	3	4	−1	4
Brazil	4	1	1	2	4	6	−2	4

10 January 2013
20:00

Brazil	1–1	Ecuador
León 38' (o.g.)	Report	Parrales 28'

Estadio del Bicentenario, San Juan
Attendance: 500
Referee: José Buitrago (Colombia)
10 January 2013
22:15

Uruguay	3–3	Peru
López 40'; Bentancourt 53'; Rolán 55'	Report	Reyna 19'; Gómez 44'; Benavente 87' (pen.)

Estadio del Bicentenario, San Juan
Attendance: 400
Referee: Enrique Cáceres (Paraguay)

12 January 2013
20:00

Brazil	2–3	Uruguay
Fred 70'; Marcos Júnior 72'	Report	Laxalt 5'; Rolán 47' (pen.); López 90'

Estadio del Bicentenario, San Juan
Attendance: 300
Referee: Patricio Loustau (Argentina)
12 January 2013
22:15

Ecuador	0–1	Venezuela
	Report	Martínez 28'

Estadio del Bicentenario, San Juan
Attendance: 300
Referee: Raúl Orosco (Bolivia)

14 January 2013
20:00

Peru	1–0	Venezuela
Benavente 36' (pen.)	Report

Estadio del Bicentenario, San Juan
Attendance: 700
Referee: Julio Bascuñán (Chile)
14 January 2013
22:15

Uruguay	2–2	Ecuador
López 19'; Aguirre 85'	Report	Esterilla 46'; Grueso 55'

Estadio del Bicentenario, San Juan
Attendance: 1,000
Referee: José Buitrago (Colombia)

16 January 2013
20:00

Brazil	1–0	Venezuela
Felipe Anderson 45' (pen.)	Report

Estadio del Bicentenario, San Juan
Attendance: 950
Referee: Raúl Orosco (Bolivia)
16 January 2013
22:15

Ecuador	2–1	Peru
Esterilla 79'; Cevallos 83'	Report	Deza 65' (pen.)

Estadio del Bicentenario, San Juan
Attendance: 1,200
Referee: Enrique Cáceres (Paraguay)

18 January 2013
17:45

Uruguay	2–2	Venezuela
Rolán 25' (pen.); López 59'	Report	Martínez 20'; Añor 47'

Estadio del Bicentenario, San Juan
Attendance: 5,000
Referee: Julio Bascuñán (Chile)
18 January 2013
20:00

Brazil	0–2	Peru
	Report	Reyna 23'; Flores 90+1'

Estadio del Bicentenario, San Juan
Attendance: 2,000
Referee: Patricio Loustau (Argentina)

== Final stage ==
The final stage was scheduled to take place between 20 January and 3 February.

Team	Pld	W	D	L	GF	GA	GD	Pts
Colombia	5	4	0	1	6	3	+3	12
Paraguay	5	3	1	1	7	4	+3	10
Uruguay	5	3	0	2	5	3	+2	9
Chile	5	2	1	2	7	6	+1	7
Peru	5	1	2	2	6	8	−2	5
Ecuador	5	0	0	5	4	11	−7	0

20 January 2013
17:30

Chile	1–3	Paraguay
Castillo 9'	Report	González 59'; Pérez 77'; Cardozo 81'

Estadio Malvinas Argentinas, Mendoza
Attendance: 2,000
Referee: Patricio Loustou (Argentina)
20 January 2013
19:45

Peru	1–3	Uruguay
Reyna 42'	Report	Formiliano 12'; López 68'; Rolán 88'

Estadio Malvinas Argentinas, Mendoza
Attendance: 1,000
Referee: Carlos Vera (Ecuador)
20 January 2013
22:00

Colombia	2–1	Ecuador
Nieto 50'; Quintero 70'	Report	Parrales 85'

Estadio Malvinas Argentinas, Mendoza
Attendance: 1,000
Referee: Enrique Cáceres (Paraguay)

23 January 2013
17:30

Chile	4–1	Ecuador
Castillo 18'; Rubio 28' (pen.); Baeza 75'; Mora 83'	Report	Esterilla 69'

Estadio Malvinas Argentinas, Mendoza
Attendance: 3,000
Referee: Víctor Hugo Carrillo (Peru)
23 January 2013
19:45

Peru	1–1	Paraguay
Araujo 28'	Report	Alonso 82'

Estadio Malvinas Argentinas, Mendoza
Attendance: 1,000
Referee: Raúl Orosco (Bolivia)
23 January 2013
22:00

Colombia	1–0	Uruguay
Córdoba 38'	Report

Estadio Malvinas Argentinas, Mendoza
Attendance: 2,400
Referee: Sandro Ricci (Brazil)

27 January 2013
17:30

Chile	0–1	Uruguay
	Report	Bueno 64'

Estadio Malvinas Argentinas, Mendoza
Attendance: 5,000
Referee: Marlon Escalante (Venezuela)
27 January 2013
19:45

Peru	0–1	Colombia
	Report	Quintero 18' (pen.)

Estadio Malvinas Argentinas, Mendoza
Attendance: 1,800
Referee: Patricio Loustau (Argentina)
27 January 2013
22:00

Paraguay	1–0	Ecuador
Villamayor 86'	Report

Estadio Malvinas Argentinas, Mendoza
Attendance: 1,000
Referee: José Buitrago (Colombia)

30 January 2013
17:30

Chile	1–0	Colombia
Castillo 45' (pen.)	Report

Estadio Malvinas Argentinas, Mendoza
Attendance: 6,000
Referee: Raúl Orosco (Bolivia)
30 January 2013
19:45

Peru	3–2	Ecuador
Reyna 28', 34'; Polo 83'	Report	Uchuari 52'; Esterilla 70'

Estadio Malvinas Argentinas, Mendoza
Attendance: 2,000
Referee: Marlon Escalante (Venezuela)
30 January 2013
22:00

Paraguay	1–0	Uruguay
Alonso 59'	Report

Estadio Malvinas Argentinas, Mendoza
Referee: Sandro Ricci (Brazil)

3 February 2013
17:15

Uruguay	1–0	Ecuador
López 5'	Report

Estadio Malvinas Argentinas, Mendoza
Attendance: 7,000
Referee: José Buitrago (Colombia)
3 February 2013
19:15

Chile	1–1	Peru
Rabello 34'	Report	Flores 7'

Estadio Malvinas Argentinas, Mendoza
Attendance: 18,000
Referee: Enrique Cáceres (Paraguay)
3 February 2013
21:15

Colombia	2–1	Paraguay
Quintero 24'; Vergara 54'	Report	Rojas 88'

Estadio Malvinas Argentinas, Mendoza
Attendance: 5,000
Referee: Patricio Loustau (Argentina)

2013 South American Youth Football champions

Colombia
Third title

== Goalscorers ==
6 goals

- (Uruguay) Nicolás López

5 goals

- (Colombia) Juan Fernando Quintero
- (Chile) Nicolás Castillo
- (Peru) Yordy Reyna

4 goals

- (Paraguay) Derlis González
- (Uruguay) Diego Rolán
- (Colombia) Jhon Córdoba
- (Ecuador) Ely Esterilla

3 goals

- (Colombia) Miguel Borja
- (Paraguay) Matías Pérez

2 goals

- (Argentina) Luciano Vietto
- (Bolivia) Rodrigo Vargas
- (Chile) Cristian Cuevas
- (Colombia) Juan Nieto
- (Ecuador) Miguel Parrales
- (Peru) Cristian Benavente
- (Peru) Edison Flores
- (Venezuela) Josef Martínez
- (Paraguay) Junior Alonso

1 goal

- (Argentina) Agustín Allione
- (Argentina) Juan Iturbe
- (Argentina) Lucas Melano
- (Argentina) Alan Ruiz
- (Bolivia) Danny Bejarano
- (Brazil) Felipe Anderson
- (Brazil) Fred
- (Brazil) Marcos Júnior
- (Chile) Alejandro Contreras
- (Chile) Claudio Baeza
- (Chile) Diego Rojas
- (Chile) Diego Rubio
- (Chile) Felipe Mora
- (Chile) Igor Lichnovsky
- (Chile) Nicolás Maturana
- (Chile) Bryan Rabello
- (Colombia) Brayan Perea
- (Colombia) Jherson Vergara Amú
- (Ecuador) Carlos Armando Grueso
- (Ecuador) José Francisco Cevallos
- (Paraguay) Rodrigo Alborno
- (Paraguay) Ángel Cardozo
- (Paraguay) Cecilio Domínguez
- (Paraguay) Gustavo Gómez
- (Paraguay) Jorge Rojas
- (Peru) Jean Deza
- (Peru) Miguel Araujo
- (Peru) Edwuin Gómez
- (Peru) Andy Polo
- (Uruguay) Rodrigo Aguirre
- (Uruguay) Diego Laxalt
- (Uruguay) Rubén Bentancourt
- (Uruguay) Mauricio Formiliano
- (Venezuela) Juan Pablo Añor

Own goal

- (Ecuador) Luis León (for Brazil)

== See also ==
- 2013 FIFA U-20 World Cup
