= Rodrigo Báez =

Paraguayan footballer

Personal information
- Full name: Rodrigo Daniel Báez Acosta
- Date of birth: 23 November 1994 (age 31)
- Place of birth: Asunción, Paraguay
- Position: Midfielder

Team information
- Current team: 29 de Setiembre

Youth career
- Olimpia

Senior career*
Years	Team	Apps	(Gls)
2012–2016	Colo-Colo	0	(0)
2012	→ Deportivo Capiatá (loan)	15	(1)
2013–2014	Colo-Colo B	34	(2)
2014–2015	→ Deportes La Serena (loan)	33	(4)
2015	→ Deportivo Santaní (loan)	6	(0)
2016	→ Iberia (loan)	5	(0)
2016	Sol de América	1	(0)
2017	Fernando de la Mora	0	(0)
2017–2019	San Lorenzo	26	(1)
2019–2022	Sportivo Ameliano	–	(–)
2022–2023	Fulgencio Yegros	–	(–)
2023	Atlético Colegiales	5	(0)
2024–	29 de Setiembre	–	(–)

International career
2009	Paraguay U15	8	(0)
2010–2011	Paraguay U17	10	(3)
- * Club domestic league appearances and goals as of 21 April 2024

Rodrigo Daniel Báez Acosta (born 23 November 1994) is a Paraguayan professional footballer who plays as a midfielder for 29 de Setiembre.

== Club career ==
On 16 January 2012, Báez reached a five-year deal with Chilean powerhouse Colo-Colo, which bought the 50% rights for a US$300.000 fee. However, two weeks later he returned to his country, joining on loan to Deportivo Capiatá — after being on trial with coach Ivo Basay — to finish his studies.

After completing his loan spell and studies, he returned to Colo-Colo on 20 December.

In June 2014, he joined Primera B (second-tier) side Deportes La Serena on loan, where played all matches of the 2014–15 season with the IV Region of Coquimbo-based team.

On 18 May 2015, it was reported that he returned to Colo-Colo and joined the pre-season and began to train with the first adult team under coach José Luis Sierra on the head, to face the season. However, he was loaned to Deportivo Santaní in his homeland and Iberia in the Chilean second level the next year.

In July 2016, he returned to Paraguay and signed with Sol de América. Since then, he has stayed in his homeland playing for clubs such as Fernando de la Mora,San Lorenzo, Sportivo Ameliano, Fulgencio Yegros and Atlético Colegiales.

In March 2024, he joined 29 de Setiembre.

== International career ==
He has represented Paraguay in under-15 and under-17 levels, having won the South American Under-15 Football Championship in 2009, being the team captain.

However, Báez failed to play the 2013 South American Youth Championship because "if he doesn’t sign for Olimpia (Paraguayan club), he wouldn‘t go the national team", so the coach Víctor Genes not considered him.
