= Matías Abisab =

Uruguayan footballer (born 1993)

Personal information
- Full name: Matías Alberto Abisab Gutiérrez
- Date of birth: 10 September 1993 (age 33)
- Place of birth: Montevideo, Uruguay
- Height: 1.65 m (5 ft 5 in)
- Position: Midfielder

Team information
- Current team: Blooming
- Number: 25

Youth career
- 2008–2011: Bella Vista

Senior career*
Years	Team	Apps	(Gls)
2011–2013	Bella Vista	38	(4)
2013–2016	Cerro	40	(3)
2016–2017	Deportivo Maldonado	33	(7)
2018	Sud América	25	(4)
2019–2021	Rentistas	47	(3)
2021-2022	Cusco	45	(4)
2023	UTC	32	(1)
2024	Deportes Temuco	19	(3)
2025–	Blooming	24	(0)
- * Club domestic league appearances and goals as of 30 December 2025

Matías Alberto Abisab Gutiérrez (born 10 September 1993), is a Uruguayan footballer who plays as a midfielder for Bolivian club Blooming.

== Career ==
In 2024, Abisab moved to Chile and joined Deportes Temuco.
