= Juan Cruz Mascia =

Uruguayan footballer (born 1994)

Personal information
- Full name: Juan Cruz Mascia Payssé
- Date of birth: 3 January 1994 (age 32)
- Place of birth: Montevideo, Uruguay
- Height: 1.88 m (6 ft 2 in)
- Position: Forward

Youth career
- Carrasco Lawn Tennis
- Miramar Misiones

Senior career*
Years	Team	Apps	(Gls)
2011	Miramar Misiones	6	(1)
2012–2017	Nacional	23	(6)
2015	→ Montevideo Wanderers (loan)	8	(0)
2016	→ Quilmes (loan)	0	(0)
2017–2018	El Tanque Sisley	10	(2)
2018	Plaza Colonia	15	(8)
2018–2019	NorthEast United	15	(3)
2019	Chacarita Juniors	9	(0)
2020–2022	Plaza Colonia	9	(2)
2022	Xinabajul	8	(0)

International career^{‡}
2009	Uruguay U15	13	(6)
2010–2011	Uruguay U17	33	(22)
2012	Uruguay U20	2	(0)
2015	Uruguay U22	4	(0)
Medal record
Men's football
Representing Uruguay
Pan American Games
Gold medal – first place	2015 Toronto	Team competition
FIFA U-17 World Cup
Runner-up	2011 Mexico
South American U-17 Championship
Runner-up	2011 Ecuador
- * Club domestic league appearances and goals as of 11 October 2020 ‡ National team caps and goals as of 26 July 2015

Juan Cruz Mascia Payssé (born 3 January 1994) is a Uruguayan professional footballer who plays as a forward.

== Club career ==
Juan was born in Carrasco, Montevideo to an Argentine father and a Uruguayan mother, and came through the youth system at Miramar Misiones. He was promoted to the first team in the 2010–11 Uruguayan Primera División season, making two substitute appearances in the campaign.

His debut came in a 5–2 loss against Danubio F.C. on 20 February 2011, when he was a 64th-minute substitute. His second match of the 2010–11 season, again as a substitute, was a 0–0 draw with Bella Vista on 8 May 2011. This was his first appearance in home stadium Parque Luis Méndez Piana. He scored his first goal with Miramar Misiones on 22 December 2011 against Deportivo Maldonado in the 2011–12 season of the Uruguayan Segunda División.

=== NorthEast United FC ===
On 27 August 2018, Mascia moved abroad and joined Indian Super League franchise NorthEast United FC. On 30 October 2018, Mascia made his debut for the club on away win against Delhi Dynamos. On 23 November 2018, he scored his first goal for the club against Kerala Blasters in the final moments of the game after coming as a substitute and hence, earned the nickname 'Super Sub Mascia'. He is also called 'Boot Jolokia' after Bhoot Jolokia for his goal against Kerala Blasters by the fans. Along with teammate Bartholomew Ogbeche and compatriot Federico Gallego, he formed one of the best attacking combinations for the club.

=== Chacarita Juniors ===
In June 2019 his transfer was announced to Chacarita Juniors of Uruguay.

== International career ==
Juan entered the Uruguay under-15s in 2009 and his first official international tournament was the 2009 South American Under-15 Football Championship in which he played six matches and scored three goals. Juan is a prolific goalscorer for the Uruguay under-17s. He was the top goalscorer, with six goals, in the 2011 South American Under-17 Football Championship, which was held in Ecuador. His first tournament goals came against the Bolivia under-17s on 15 March 2011. In this match he scored both Uruguay goals in a 2–0 group stage victory. He scored another double in a 3–2 win against the Colombia under-17s in a final group stage game on 6 April 2011, helping Uruguay finish the competition as runners up to champions Brazil.

He also represented Uruguay in the 2011 FIFA U-17 World Cup in Mexico. He scored against the Canada under-17s in the group stage on 19 June 2011. Uruguay advanced to the final of the high-status tournament, where they lost 2–0 to hosts Mexico under-17s on 10 July 2011.

== Reputation ==
Following his success at under-17 level, Juan is a reported transfer target for clubs in England, Spain and Italy. He has also been favourably compared to 2010 FIFA World Cup star Diego Forlán in the English and South American media. For example, in April and May 2011 articles, the UK tabloid The Daily Mirror and the FIFA website referred to him as the "new Forlán" and the "Forlán's heir" respectively. In the same month, Uruguay newspaper El Observador reported that Forlán was, in fact, a keen admirer of the player and had arranged for him to attend a training session with Atlético Madrid.

== Career statistics ==
As of 30 June 2011

Club statistics
Club	Season	League		National Cup		League Cup		Other		Total	
Club	Season	App	Goals	App	Goals	App	Goals	App	Goals	App	Goals
Miramar Misiones	2010–11	2	0	0	0	0	0	0	0	2	0
Miramar Misiones	2011–12	4	1	0	0	0	0	0	0	4	1
Total		6	1	0	0	0	0	0	0	6	1

== Achievements ==
Uruguay U17

- FIFA Under-17 World Cup runner-up: 2011
- South American Under-17 Football Championship runner-up: 2011

Uruguay U23

- Pan American Games: 2015

Individual

- South American Under-17 Football Championship top goalscorer: 2011 South American Under-17 Football Championship

== Personal life ==
Mascia has two brothers, Franco and Bautista. The latter also has Argentine citizenship.
