= Nicolás Palma =

Chilean footballer

Personal information
- Full name: Nicolás Andrés Palma Pardo
- Date of birth: 8 October 2001 (age 25)
- Place of birth: La Cisterna, Santiago, Chile
- Height: 1.82 m (6 ft 0 in)
- Position: Defender

Team information
- Current team: Unión La Calera

Youth career
- Cobreloa

Senior career*
Years	Team	Apps	(Gls)
2020–2025	Cobreloa	89	(1)
2026–	Unión La Calera	0	(0)
- * Club domestic league appearances and goals as of 1 January 2025

Nicolás Andrés Palma Pardo (born 8 October 2001) is a Chilean professional footballer who plays as a defender for Chilean Primera División club Unión La Calera.

== Club career ==
Born in La Cisterna commune, Santiago de Chile, Palma is a product of Cobreloa and made his professional debut in the 6–0 win against Deportes Valdivia on 21 January 2021 for the Copa Chile alongside the goalkeeper Hugo Araya. He got regularity the next seasons and won the 2023 Primera B. He continued with them in the 2024 Chilean Primera División and left them at the end of 2025.

On 1 January 2026, Palma signed with Unión La Calera in the Liga de Primera.

== Honours ==
Cobreloa

- Primera B de Chile: 2023
