= 2011 South American U-17 Championship =

Campeonato Sudamericano Sub-17 Ecuador 2011

Tournament details
- Host country: Ecuador
- Dates: 12 March – 9 April
- Teams: 10 (from 1 confederation)
- Venues: 6 (in 5 host cities)

Final positions
- Champions: Brazil (10th title)
- Runners-up: Uruguay
- Third place: Argentina
- Fourth place: Ecuador

Tournament statistics
- Matches played: 35
- Goals scored: 110 (3.14 per match)
- Top scorer(s): (Uruguay) Juan Cruz Mascia (6 goals)

The 2011 South American Under-17 Football Championship (Spanish: Campeonato Sudamericano Sub-17 Ecuador 2011) was the 14th U-17 tournament for national teams affiliated with CONMEBOL. It was held in Ecuador from 12 March to 9 April 2011.

This tournament gave four berths to the 2011 FIFA U-17 World Cup, which was held in Mexico, and also the 2011 Pan American Games in Guadalajara, Mexico. Brazil won their tenth title and their fourth in a row. They qualified to the aforementioned tournaments along with Uruguay, Argentina, and Ecuador.

== Teams ==
- Argentina
- Bolivia
- Brazil (holders)
- Chile
- Colombia
- Ecuador (hosts)
- Paraguay
- Peru
- Uruguay
- Venezuela

== Venues ==
Five stadiums in five host cities were chosen for the tournament. Due to a scheduling conflict on the final match day, another stadium in Quito was added and used in the tournament.

Ambato	2011 South American U-17 Championship is located in Ecuador
Estadio Bellavista	2011 South American U-17 Championship is located in Ecuador
Capacity: 19,337	2011 South American U-17 Championship is located in Ecuador
Ibarra	2011 South American U-17 Championship is located in Ecuador
Estadio Olímpico	2011 South American U-17 Championship is located in Ecuador
Capacity: 18,600	2011 South American U-17 Championship is located in Ecuador
Latacunga	2011 South American U-17 Championship is located in Ecuador
Estadio La Cocha	2011 South American U-17 Championship is located in Ecuador
Capacity: 15,220	2011 South American U-17 Championship is located in Ecuador
Quito	2011 South American U-17 Championship is located in Ecuador
Estadio Olímpico Atahualpa	2011 South American U-17 Championship is located in Ecuador
Capacity: 40,948	2011 South American U-17 Championship is located in Ecuador
Estadio de Liga Deportiva Universitaria	2011 South American U-17 Championship is located in Ecuador
Capacity: 55,104	2011 South American U-17 Championship is located in Ecuador
Riobamba	2011 South American U-17 Championship is located in Ecuador
Estadio Olímpico	2011 South American U-17 Championship is located in Ecuador
Capacity: 18,936	2011 South American U-17 Championship is located in Ecuador

== Officials ==
On 8 February 2011, CONMEBOL's Commission on Referees announced the list of 10 referees and assistant to be used for the tournament.

Officials

- (Argentina) Néstor Pitana
- (Bolivia) José Jordán
- (Brazil) Ricardo Marques
- (Chile) Patricio Polic
- (Colombia) Héctor Parra
- (Ecuador) Diego Lara
- (Paraguay) Julio Quintana
- (Peru) Henry Gambetta
- (Uruguay) Héctor Martínez
- (Venezuela) Mayker Gómez

Assistants

- (Argentina) Alejo Castany
- (Bolivia) Javier Bustillos
- (Brazil) Marcio Santiago
- (Chile) Juan Maturana
- (Colombia) Wilmar Navarro
- (Ecuador) Byron Romero
- (Paraguay) Carlos Cáceres
- (Peru) Jorge Yupanqui
- (Uruguay) Carlos Changala
- (Venezuela) Jairo Romero

== Squads ==
Each national team had to present a list of twenty players by 2 March 2011, but each association had the ability to change five players up to five days before the start of the tournament. All the players had to be born after 1 January 1994.

== First stage ==
When teams finish level of points, the final order determined according to:

1. superior goal difference in all matches
2. greater number of goals scored in all group matches
3. better result in matches between tied teams
4. drawing of lots

All match times are in local Ecuadorian time (UTC−05:00).

Key to colors in group tables
Top 3 teams in each group advanced to the final stage

=== Group A ===
Team	Pld	W	D	L	GF	GA	GD	Pts
Argentina	4	3	0	1	10	4	+6	9
Ecuador	4	2	1	1	4	4	0	7
Uruguay	4	2	0	2	4	5	−1	6
Peru	4	1	1	2	8	9	−1	4
Bolivia	4	1	0	3	5	9	−4	3

12 March 2011
16:00

Ecuador	2–1	Bolivia
Batioja 22'; Mercado 24'	Report	Silva 49'

Estadio La Cocha, Latacunga
Referee: Ricardo Márques (Brazil)
12 March 2011
18:10

Argentina	4–2	Peru
Paredes 44' (pen.); Ocampos 50'; Ferreira 69'; Pugh 84'	Report	García 4'; Polo 36'

Estadio La Cocha, Latacunga
Referee: Patricio Polic (Chile)

15 March 2011
17:00

Peru	1–1	Ecuador
Polo 57'	Report	Sornoza 47'

Estadio Bellavista, Ambato
Referee: Héctor Parra (Colombia)
15 March 2011
19:10

Bolivia	0–2	Uruguay
	Report	Mascia 18', 27'

Estadio Bellavista, Ambato
Referee: Julio Quintana (Paraguay)

18 March 2011
16:00

Argentina	1–2	Uruguay
Andrada 41' (pen.)	Report	Mascia 36'; San Martin 87'

Estadio Olímpico, Riobamba
Referee: Ricardo Márques (Brazil)
18 March 2011
18:10

Peru	2–4	Bolivia
Flores 21', 29'	Report	Silva 13', 62', 90'; Banegas 68'

Estadio Olímpico, Riobamba
Referee: Mayker Gómez (Venezuela)

21 March 2011
17:00

Ecuador	1–0	Uruguay
Sornoza 16'	Report

Estadio La Cocha, Latacunga
Referee: Patricio Polic (Chile)
21 March 2011
19:10

Argentina	3–0	Bolivia
Ocampos 16'; Paredes 58'; Pugh 82' (pen.)	Report

Estadio La Cocha, Latacunga
Referee: Héctor Parra (Colombia)
- The game was suspended in the 2nd half due to a blackout with Argentina leading 2–0, and was completed on 22 March.

24 March 2011
17:00

Uruguay	0–3	Peru
	Report	Flores 38'; Benincasa 50'; Polo 66'

Estadio La Cocha, Latacunga
Referee: Mayker Gómez (Venezuela)
24 March 2011
19:10

Argentina	2–0	Ecuador
Pinto 52' (pen.); Benítez 72'	Report

Estadio La Cocha, Latacunga
Referee: Julio Quintana (Paraguay)

=== Group B ===
Team	Pld	W	D	L	GF	GA	GD	Pts
Brazil	4	3	0	1	12	7	+5	9
Paraguay	4	3	0	1	9	5	+4	9
Colombia	4	2	1	1	7	8	−1	7
Chile	4	1	1	2	5	8	−3	4
Venezuela	4	0	0	4	5	10	−5	0

13 March 2011
10:00

Brazil	4–3	Venezuela
Pedro Paulo 11', 76'; Adryan 16'; Lucas Piazon 72'	Report	Arteaga 6', 8'; González 34'

Estadio Olímpico, Ibarra
Referee: Diego Lara (Ecuador)
13 March 2011
12:10

Colombia	2–2	Chile
Garcés 35', 36'	Report	Navarrete 59'; Henríquez 73'

Estadio Olímpico, Ibarra
Referee: Henry Gambetta (Peru)

16 March 2011
16:00

Colombia	3–1	Paraguay
Delgado 12'; Palomeque 78'; Osorio 90+1'	Report	González 55'

Estadio Olímpico, Ibarra
Referee: Héctor Martínez (Uruguay)
16 March 2011
18:10

Brazil	2–1	Chile
Emerson 80'; Adryan 87'	Report	Henríquez 73'

Estadio Olímpico, Ibarra
Referee: Néstor Pitana (Argentina)

19 March 2011
18:00

Chile	2–1	Venezuela
Henríquez 41'; Páez 70'	Report	García 7'

Estadio Olímpico, Ibarra
Referee: José Jordán (Bolivia)
19 March 2011
20:10

Brazil	1–2	Paraguay
Lucas Piazon 31'	Report	Giménez 77'; Caballero 81'

Estadio Olímpico, Ibarra
Referee: Diego Lara (Ecuador)

22 March 2011
16:00

Paraguay	3–0	Chile
Caballero 26', 80'; Báez 53'	Report

Estadio Olímpico, Ibarra
Referee: Néstor Pitana (Argentina)
22 March 2011
18:10

Colombia	1–0	Venezuela
Cuero 8'	Report

Estadio Olímpico, Ibarra
Referee: Henry Gambetta (Peru)

25 March 2011
19:00

Paraguay	3–1	Venezuela
Palacios 16'; Florenciáñez 42', 61'	Report	Castillo 47'

Estadio Olímpico, Ibarra
Referee: José Jordán (Bolivia)
25 March 2011
21:10

Brazil	5–1	Colombia
Leo 18', 20'; Cláudio Winck 36'; Misael 62'; Marlon Bica 79'	Report	Villadiego 76'

Estadio Olímpico, Ibarra
Referee: Héctor Martínez (Uruguay)

== Final stage ==
Key to colors in group tables
Top 4 teams advanced to the 2011 FIFA U-17 World Cup and 2011 Pan American Games

Team	Pld	W	D	L	GF	GA	GD	Pts
Brazil	5	4	1	0	10	4	+6	13
Uruguay	5	2	3	0	8	5	+3	9
Argentina	5	2	1	2	7	7	0	7
Ecuador	5	1	3	1	6	7	−1	6
Colombia	5	1	1	3	5	7	−2	4
Paraguay	5	0	1	4	5	11	−6	1

28 March 2011
15:50

Argentina	1–0	Paraguay
Benítez 75'	Report

Estadio La Cocha, Latacunga
Referee: Héctor Parra (Colombia)
28 March 2011
18:00

Ecuador	0–0	Colombia
	Report

Estadio La Cocha, Latacunga
Referee: Mayker Gómez (Venezuela)
28 March 2011
20:10

Brazil	0–0	Uruguay
	Report

Estadio La Cocha, Latacunga
Referee: Julio Quintana (Paraguay)

31 March 2011
15:50

Argentina	1–1	Uruguay
Andrada 70'	Report	Padilla 75' (o.g.)

Estadio Olímpico Atahualpa, Quito
Referee: Diego Lara (Ecuador)
31 March 2011
18:00

Ecuador	2–2	Paraguay
Batioja 27'; Uchuari 83'	Report	Ovelar 77'; Caballero 85'

Estadio Olímpico Atahualpa, Quito
Referee: Néstor Pitana (Argentina)
31 March 2011
20:10

Brazil	1–0	Colombia
Matheus Barbosa 55'	Report

Estadio Olímpico Atahualpa, Quito
Referee: José Jordán (Bolivia)

3 April 2011
15:50

Paraguay	1–3	Uruguay
Caballero 78'	Report	Aguirre 22'; Álvarez 59'; Mascia 75'

Estadio La Cocha, Latacunga
Referee: Patricio Polic (Chile)
3 April 2011
18:00

Argentina	2–1	Colombia
Ocampos 4'; Andrada 16' (pen.)	Report	Cuero 22'

Estadio La Cocha, Latacunga
Referee: Henry Gambetta (Peru)
3 April 2011
20:10

Brazil	3–1	Ecuador
Matheus Barbosa 24'; Leo 28'; Adryan 53' (pen.)	Report	Cevallos 90+4'

Estadio La Cocha, Latacunga
Referee: Héctor Martínez (Uruguay)

6 April 2011
15:50

Uruguay	3–2	Colombia
Mascia 24', 36' (pen.); Silva 82'	Report	Garcés 39', 69'

Estadio Olímpico Atahualpa, Quito
Referee: Mayker Gómez (Venezuela)
6 April 2011
18:00

Argentina	1–2	Ecuador
Pugh 83'	Report	Cevallos 54'; Batioja 73'

Estadio Olímpico Atahualpa, Quito
Referee: Patricio Polic (Chile)
6 April 2011
20:10

Brazil	3–1	Paraguay
Guilherme 15'; Cláudio Winck 56'; Lucas Piazon 86'	Report	Mareco 31'

Estadio Olímpico Atahualpa, Quito
Referee: Henry Gambetta (Peru)

9 April 2011
15:50

Paraguay	1–2	Colombia
Benítez 90'	Report	Cuero 12', 29'

Estadio de Liga Deportiva Universitaria, Quito
Referee: Diego Lara (Ecuador)
9 April 2011
18:00

Ecuador	1–1	Uruguay
Cevallos 58' (pen.)	Report	San Martín 19'

Estadio de Liga Deportiva Universitaria, Quito
Referee: Héctor Parra (Colombia)
9 April 2011
20:10

Argentina	2–3	Brazil
Báez 31'; Andrada 80'	Report	Leo 27'; Guilherme 32'; Matheus Barbosa 77'

Estadio de Liga Deportiva Universitaria, Quito
Referee: Julio Quintana (Paraguay)

2011 South American Under-17 Football champions

Brazil
10th title

== Goalscorers ==
6 goals

- (Uruguay) Juan Cruz Mascia

5 goals

- (Paraguay) Mauro Caballero

4 goals

- (Argentina) Federico Andrada
- (Bolivia) Robert Royer Silva
- (Brazil) Leo
- (Colombia) Fabián Cuero
- (Colombia) Cristian Garcés

3 goals

- (Argentina) Leandro Paredes
- (Argentina) Lucas Pugh
- (Brazil) Adryan
- (Brazil) Lucas Piazon
- (Brazil) Matheus Barbosa
- (Chile) Ángelo Henríquez
- (Ecuador) Luis Batioja
- (Ecuador) José Francisco Cevallos
- (Peru) Édison Flores
- (Peru) Andy Polo

2 goals

- (Argentina) Martín Benítez
- (Argentina) Lucas Ocampos
- (Brazil) Cláudio Winck
- (Brazil) Emerson
- (Brazil) Guilherme
- (Brazil) Pedro Paulo
- (Ecuador) Junior Sornoza
- (Paraguay) Carlos Florenciáñez
- (Uruguay) Juan San Martín
- (Venezuela) Manuel Arteaga

1 goal

- (Argentina) Ezequiel Báez
- (Argentina) Brian Ferreira
- (Argentina) Marcos Pinto
- (Bolivia) Luis Fernando Banegas
- (Brazil) Marlon Bica
- (Brazil) Misael
- (Chile) Gerrado Navarrete
- (Chile) Ariel Páez
- (Colombia) Ricardo Delgado
- (Colombia) Pedro Osorio
- (Colombia) Cristian Palomeque
- (Colombia) Yuldor Villadiego

1 goal (cont.)

- (Ecuador) Kevin Mercado
- (Ecuador) Jonny Uchuari
- (Paraguay) Rodrigo Báez
- (Paraguay) Alan Benítez
- (Paraguay) Christian Giménez
- (Paraguay) Derlis González
- (Paraguay) Miller Mareco
- (Paraguay) Sebastián Olevar
- (Paraguay) Christian Palacios
- (Peru) Horacio Benincasa
- (Peru) Raziel García
- (Uruguay) Elbio Álvarez
- (Uruguay) Rodrigo Aguirre
- (Uruguay) Gastón Silva
- (Venezuela) Édson Castillo
- (Venezuela) Alejandro González
- (Venezuela) Víctor García

Own goals

- (Argentina) Maximiliano Padilla (playing against Uruguay)

== See also ==
- 2011 FIFA U-17 World Cup
- Football at the 2011 Pan American Games- Men's tournament
