= Martín Cortés (footballer) =

Argentine-Chilean footballer (born 1983)

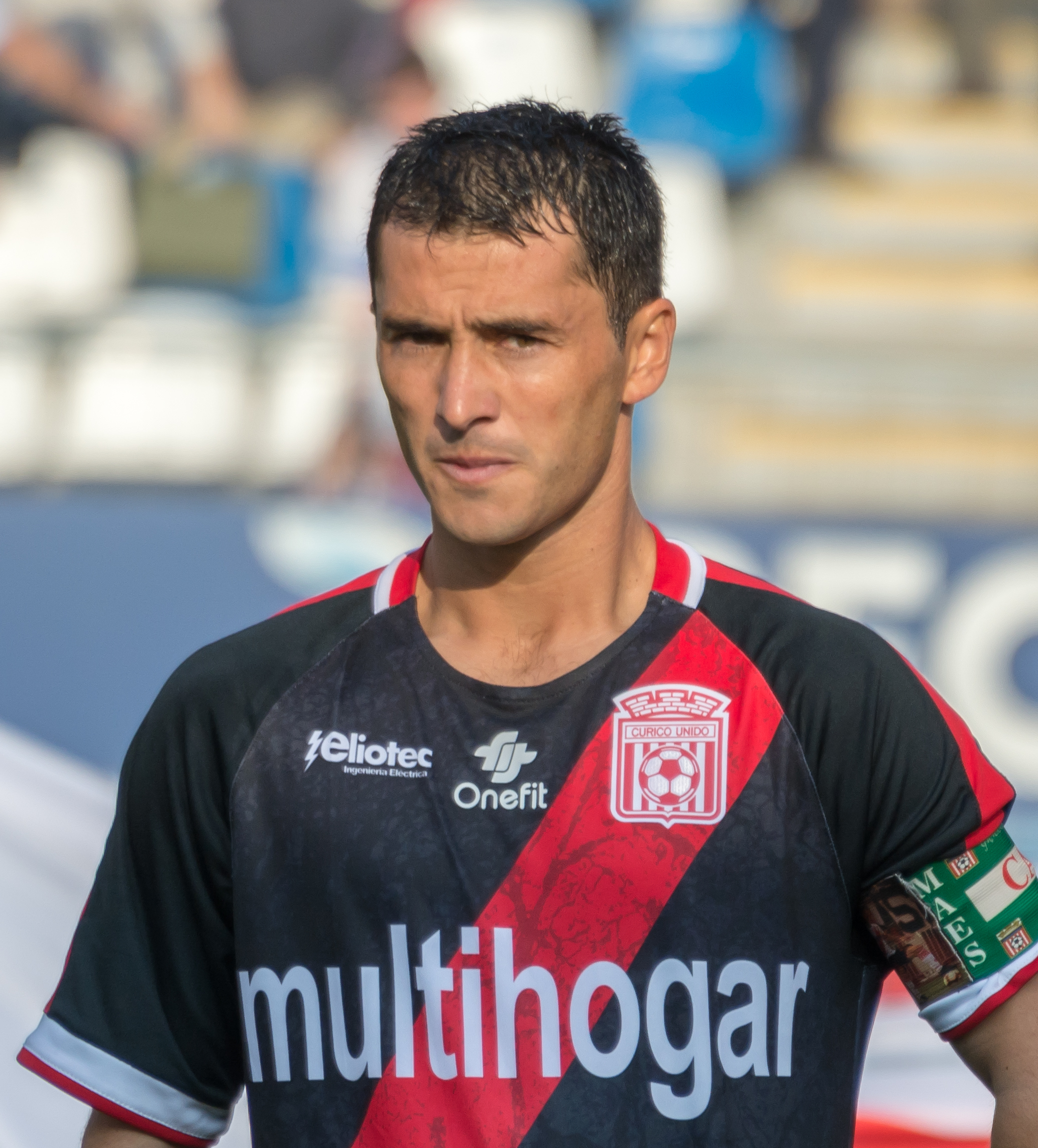
- Cortés with Curicó Unido in 2019.

Personal information
- Full name: Martín Miguel Cortés
- Date of birth: 7 January 1983 (age 43)
- Place of birth: Punta Alta, Argentina
- Height: 1.65 m (5 ft 5 in)
- Position: Midfielder

Youth career
- River Plate

Senior career*
Years	Team	Apps	(Gls)
2004	River Plate	0	(0)
2004–2005	RAEC Mons	17	(1)
2006–2009	Defensores de Belgrano	83	(3)
2009–2011	Ñublense	42	(2)
2011	Paysandu	0	(0)
2011–2012	Curicó Unido	36	(0)
2012	Andes Talleres	10	(1)
2013–2014	Deportes Copiapó	42	(3)
2014–2021	Curicó Unido	162	(7)
2021	Universidad de Concepción	24	(1)
2022	Curicó Unido	4	(0)
Total		420	(18)
- * Club domestic league appearances and goals

Martín Miguel Cortés (born 7 January 1983) is an Argentine naturalized Chilean former footballer who played as a midfielder.

== Career ==
Cortés retired at the end of the 2022 season, as a player of Curicó Unido.

== Personal life ==
Cortés naturalized Chilean by residence in 2018, freeing up a spot as an international player in the Chilean football.
