= Fabián Cuero =

Colombian footballer (born 1994)

Personal information
- Full name: Fabián Cuero Segura
- Date of birth: 7 January 1994 (age 32)
- Place of birth: Pradera, Colombia
- Height: 1.85 m (6 ft 1 in)
- Position: Forward

Team information
- Current team: Oliveirense
- Number: 40

Youth career
- 2011–2012: Banfield

Senior career*
Years	Team	Apps	(Gls)
2012–2014	Banfield	0	(0)
2012–2013	→ Tijuana (loan)		
2014	→ Llaneros (loan)	3	(1)
2015	Unión Aconquija	3	(0)
2015–2016	Braga B	6	(0)
2016–	Oliveirense	20	(9)
- * Club domestic league appearances and goals as of 2 April 2017

Fabián Cuero Segura, known as Fabián Cuero (born 7 January 1994) is a Colombian professional footballer who plays as a forward for Oliveirense.

== Career ==
Cuero made his professional debut in the Segunda Liga for Braga B on 15 August 2015 in a game against Gil Vicente.

He scored four goals for Colombia at the 2011 South American Under-17 Football Championship.
