= Matías Pérez (footballer, born 1985) =

Uruguayan footballer

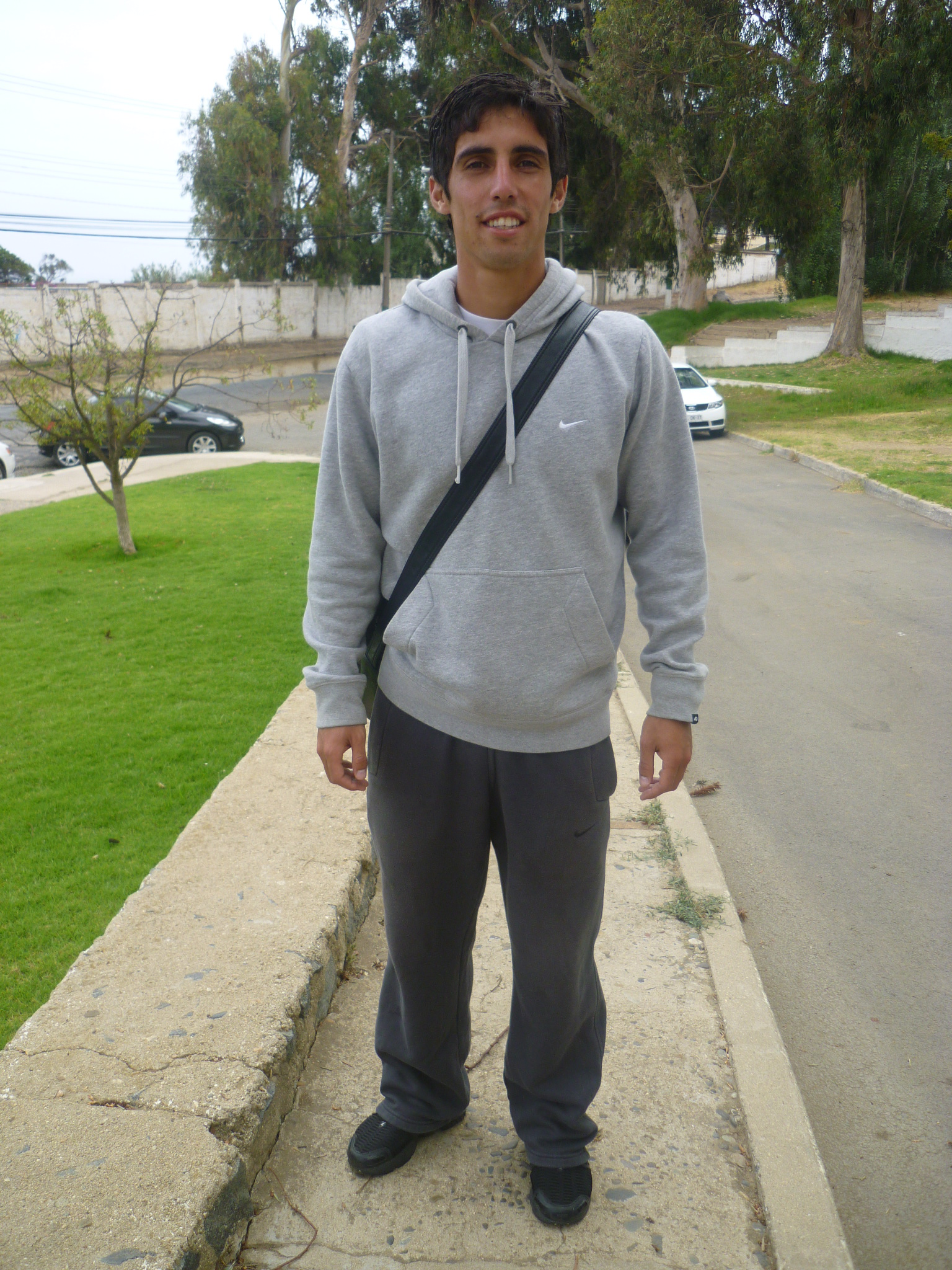

Personal information
- Full name: Matías Omar Pérez Laborda
- Date of birth: July 20, 1985 (age 41)
- Place of birth: Cardona, Uruguay
- Height: 1.73 m (5 ft 8 in)
- Position: Left back

Senior career*
Years	Team	Apps	(Gls)
2006–2007	Peñarol	21	(1)
2007–2009	Danubio	53	(6)
2009–2010	Arsenal de Sarandí	16	(2)
2010	Danubio	11	(2)
2011	Santiago Wanderers	25	(3)
2012	Universidad Católica	22	(0)
2013	Danubio	13	(1)
2013–2014	Quilmes	7	(0)
2014–2015	Juventud	26	(5)
2015	Omonia	1	(0)
2016	Rentistas	6	(0)
2016–2017	Boston River	2	(0)
2017	Fénix	1	(0)
2017	Danubio	4	(0)
2018	Atenas	4	(0)
- * Club domestic league appearances and goals as of 23:11, 26 September 2020 (UTC)

Matías Omar Pérez Laborda (born 20 July 1985) is a Uruguayan football player who plays as a left back.

== Career ==
Pérez began his career playing for Uruguayan club Peñarol in 2006. He joined Danubio in 2007.

In 2009 Pérez joined Argentine side Arsenal de Sarandí. He made his debut for the club on 22 August 2009 in a 0–2 home defeat to Estudiantes de La Plata. He scored his first goal for the club on 8 October 2009 in a 4–1 away defeat to Colón de Santa Fe.

In August 2010 he returned to Danubio. After playing the Torneo Apertura with Danubio, when he scored 2 goals in 11 matches he left the club to join Santiago Wanderers.
