= Óscar Añez =

Bolivian footballer (born 1990)

Personal information
- Full name: Óscar Añez Urachianta
- Date of birth: 23 July 1990 (age 36)
- Place of birth: Santa Cruz de la Sierra, Bolivia
- Height: 1.72 m (5 ft 7 1/2 in)
- Position: Defender

Team information
- Current team: Always Ready

Senior career*
Years	Team	Apps	(Gls)
2009–2013	Universitario de Sucre	127	(2)
2013–2016	Blooming	52	(1)
2016–2018	Guabirá	85	(0)
2019–	Always Ready	3	(0)

International career^{‡}
2012–	Bolivia	1	(0)
- * Club domestic league appearances and goals as of 12 February 2019 ‡ National team caps and goals as of 4 April 2012

Óscar Añez Urachianta (born 23 July 1990) is a Bolivian international footballer who plays for Club Always Ready, as a defender.

== Career ==
Born in Santa Cruz de la Sierra, Añez has played club football for Club Universitario since 2009. In June 2013 he signed a two-year contract with Blooming, team which he confessed his preference.

Añez made his international debut for Bolivia in 2012.
