= Alberto Justiniano =

Alberto Justiniano is founder and artistic director of Teatro del Pueblo, a Latinx theater in St. Paul, Minnesota. He is a prominent member of the National Latina/o Commons and the Twin Cities Theaters of Color Coalition. Justiniano assumes a variety of roles in his work, including theater director, playwright, filmmaker, producer, and teacher.

== Career ==
Justiniano got his bachelor's degree at the University of Minnesota, and a graduate degree along with a television certificate through Rockport's International Television and Film studies program.

In 1993, the Playwrights' Center of Minneapolis awarded Justiniano the Many Voices Residency Award, which allowed him to work collaboratively with industry professional in the Twin Cities. A year later, the Playwrights' Center selected him as an associate member, allowing him to do further research concerning social justice issues and multi-cultural themes in theater. He researched the usage of theater as a tool for crime prevention for children, which won him the Leadership and Arts Award in 1994. In 1997, he worked with Hazelwood, the first integrated school in Belfast, Northern Ireland, to utilize art in their community as a way of engaging students and faculty in conflict resolution and social justice issues. Throughout his career, Justiniano has continued to visit various Catholic and Protestant schools to integrate art into their communities in the same way. In 2000, Justiniano founded the annual Political Theater Festival of Minnesota, where political ideas and theatrical productions come together in an exchange for better awareness of multi-cultural issues in theater. This festival has become a tradition and has also led to the creation of integrative programs between Latinx and Hmong communities in Minnesota.

As a theater director and playwright, Justiniano has written and produced three children's musicals, Anansi’s Carnival Adventure, Cassie the Crab and Rosita the Island Girl, and The Legend of Lento El Coyote. He has written six full-length adult plays and produced three of them for the stage. Anansi's Carnival Adventure, which was produced in May 1998 at the Stepping Stone Theater, tells the story of an Afro-Latina spider named Anansi who helps her friends save their forest when the mayor of their island sells their land to developers. Cassie the Crab and Rosita the Island Girl, which was produced on Stepping Stone's stage in 2004, illustrates the story of two misfit friends who come together to save their neighborhood after a devastating oil spill. Justiniano is currently working on another children's play, which will be called Welcome to Welcomeville. He has also directed several productions for teenagers through Teatro del Pueblo's educational program to introduce more advanced multi-cultural themes to young adults. At Teatro del Pueblo, Justiniano is the curator of their Political Theater series and the Lation/Asian Fusion Series in collaboration with Pangea World Theater. He has several short and television films to his name, most of which have aired nationally on PBS.

== Awards ==
- Many Voices Residency Award (1993) - Playwrights’ Center of Minneapolis
- Leadership and Arts Award (1994) - St. Paul Companies
- Fransico Rosales Community Award (2009)
- Target Community Award (2012)
- Pro Lingua Award (2013)
