= SteppingStone Theatre for Youth Development =

Youth theater in Saint Paul, Minnesota, United States

Coordinates: 44°56′35″N 93°8′12″W

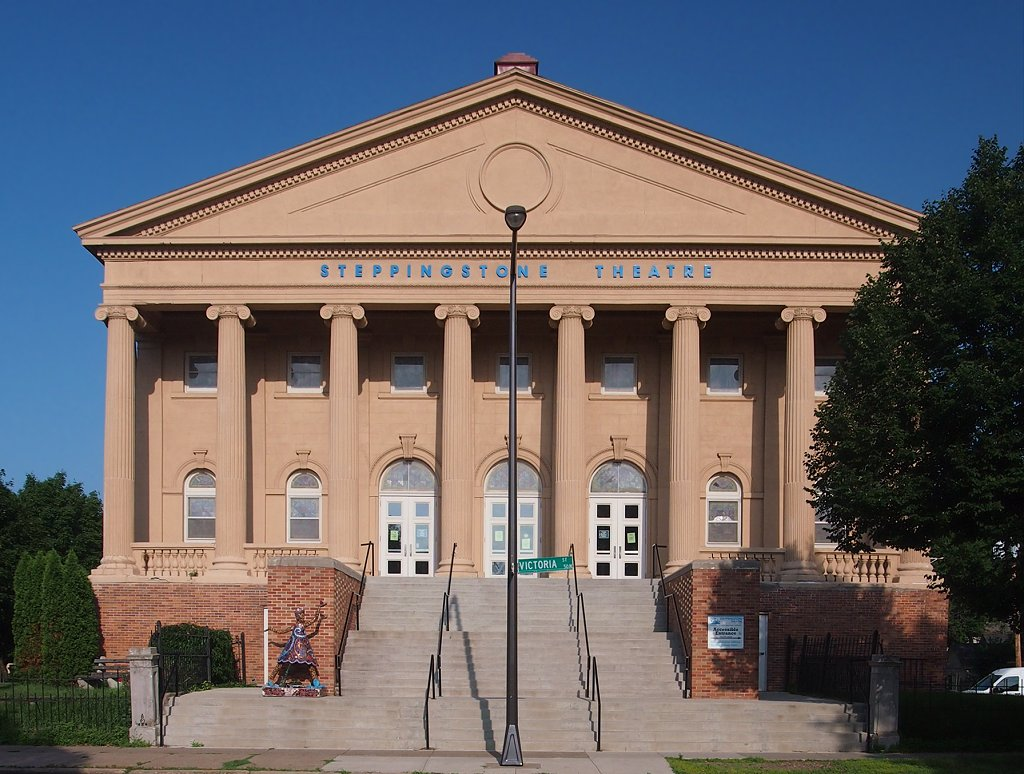
SteppingStone Theatre for Youth Development from the east

SteppingStone Theatre for Youth Development, now known as Park Square Education, is the largest performing theatre for youth in the greater Saint Paul area. The mainstage season, which runs annually from October to July, features many plays written on commission by emerging local playwrights. SteppingStone Theatre also offers years round youth acting classes, workshops and residencies throughout the Twin Cities and greater Minnesota.

== History ==
SteppingStone Theatre for Youth Development was founded in 1987 with two artist-in-residence programs at inner-city Saint Paul schools that gave students a chance to have a participatory theatre experience. SteppingStone Theatre's focus has been on reaching out to children and youth who would not otherwise have the opportunity to participate in theatre and providing them with an expanding range of educational theatre experiences.

In 2021, SteppingStone Theatre merged with Park Square Theatre and now operates under the unified Park Square Education brand.

Today, this focus is pursued through a wide variety of pay-as-your-able programming, including youth productions, camps, classes, workshops, matinees and more.

== Home until 2021 ==
Construction on the former Grace Community Church, located at Victoria Street in Saint Paul next to William Mitchell College of Law, began February 2, 2007. SteppingStone Theatre officially moved into its new home on December 1, 2007, to open The Best Christmas Pageant Ever! that day.

The renovation included improvement of the exterior; conversion of the sanctuary into a 430-seat theatre with a proscenium-style stage equipped with modern lighting and sound capabilities; installation of an elevator for accessibility to all areas of the building; and construction of classrooms, dressing rooms and administrative offices on the lower level.

Now Steppingstone Theatre (under the name Park Square Education) is located in the Historic Hamm Building in downtown St. Paul, with summer camps held at Concordia University.
