= Francisco Vera =

Paraguayan footballer (born 1994)

Personal information
- Full name: Francisco Miguel Vera González
- Date of birth: 21 May 1994 (age 32)
- Place of birth: Minga Guazú, Paraguay
- Height: 1.85 m (6 ft 1 in)
- Position: Striker

Youth career
- Rubio Ñu

Senior career*
Years	Team	Apps	(Gls)
2010–2015	Rubio Ñu	69	(8)
2015–2017	Benfica B	17	(1)
2016	→ Fénix (loan)	5	(0)
2017	Rubio Ñu	4	(0)
2018	Club Petrolero	0	(0)
Total		95	(9)

International career
2011	Paraguay U17	4	(0)
- * Club domestic league appearances and goals as of 22 July 2019

Francisco Miguel Vera González (born 21 May 1994) is a Paraguayan former professional footballer who played as a striker.

== Club career ==
Born in Minga Guazú, Vera started his career at Rubio Ñu. He then played for Paraguay's under-17's side before moving to Portuguese club Benfica in June 2015 on a €2.8 million transfer fee.
