= Pier Larrauri =

Peruvian footballer (born 1994)

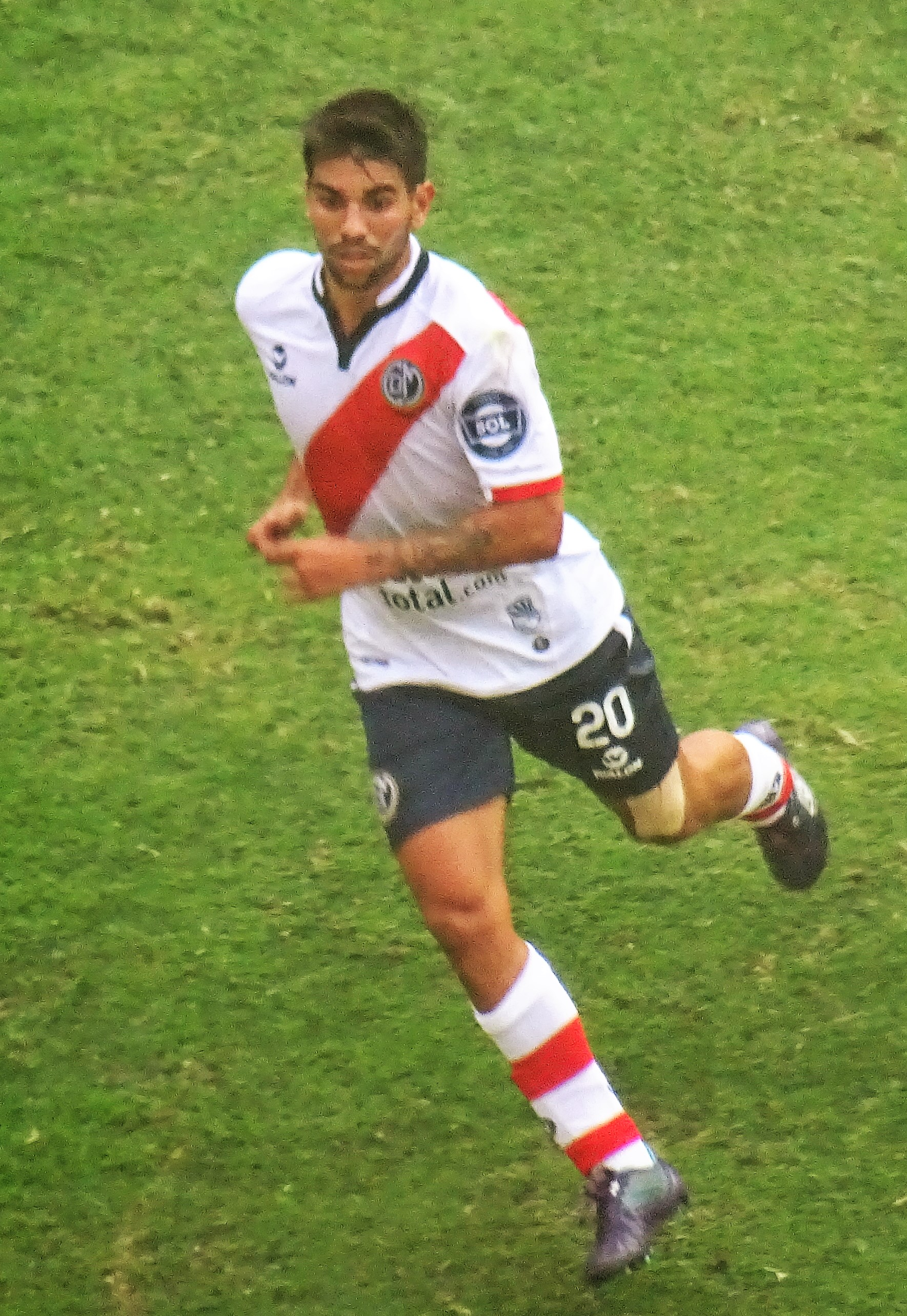
- Pier Larrauri in 2018

Personal information
- Full name: Pier Antonio Larrauri Conroy
- Date of birth: 26 March 1994 (age 32)
- Place of birth: Siena, Italy
- Height: 1.76 m (5 ft 9 in)
- Position: Midfielder

Youth career
- –2009: Sporting Cristal
- 2007: → Bayern Munich (loan)
- 2009–2013: Leicester City
- 2012–2013: → Pachuca (loan)

Senior career*
Years	Team	Apps	(Gls)
2013–2014	Sporting Cristal	11	(0)
2015	Cienciano	13	(6)
2015–2016	Alianza Lima	21	(1)
2017–2019	Deportivo Municipal	76	(13)
2020	Cienciano	22	(2)
2021	Sport Boys	3	(0)
2022–2023	Binacional	6	(0)
2023	FAS	0	(0)
2023	Deportivo Coopsol	17	(1)
2023–2024	Ceahlăul Piatra Neamț	7	(0)

International career
2011	Peru U17		
- * Club domestic league appearances and goals as of 20 April 2024

Pier Larrauri (born 26 March 1994) is a Peruvian professional footballer who plays as a midfielder.

== Personal life ==
Larrauri was born in Siena, Italy, to Peruvian parents.

== Honours ==
Sporting Cristal

- Peruvian Primera División: 2014
