= Nicolás Maturana =

Chilean footballer (born 1993)

Personal information
- Full name: Nicolás Alexander Maturana Caneo
- Date of birth: 8 July 1993 (age 33)
- Place of birth: Lampa, Santiago, Chile
- Height: 1.63 m (5 ft 4 in)
- Position: Attacking midfielder

Team information
- Current team: Deportivo Fraijanes
- Number: 9

Youth career
- Universidad de Chile

Senior career*
Years	Team	Apps	(Gls)
2011–2016	Universidad de Chile	28	(2)
2012	→ Rangers (loan)	10	(0)
2012	→ Rangers B (loan)	3	(0)
2012	→ Barnechea (loan)	10	(4)
2014	→ Deportes Iquique (loan)	15	(0)
2014	→ Barnechea (loan)	9	(4)
2015	→ Elche (loan)	0	(0)
2015	→ Alcoyano (loan)	5	(0)
2015–2016	→ Palestino (loan)	34	(5)
2017	Necaxa	10	(1)
2017–2020	Colo-Colo	13	(0)
2019	→ Universidad de Concepción (loan)	16	(0)
2020–2023	Cobreloa	65	(6)
2023	→ Deportes Santa Cruz (loan)	16	(0)
2024	Real Estelí	3	(0)
2024	San Antonio Unido	15	(1)
2025	Deportes Melipilla	1	(0)
2026	Ciudad de Yantzaza	–	(–)
2026–	Deportivo Fraijanes	–	(–)

International career
2013	Chile U20	12	(1)
- * Club domestic league appearances and goals as of 25 January 2026

Nicolás Alexander Maturana Caneo (born 8 July 1993) is a Chilean professional footballer who plays as an attacking midfielder for Guatemalan club Deportivo Fraijanes.

== Club career ==
He debuted on 23 April 2011, in a 0–0 draw of Universidad de Chile against Palestino for the 2011 Torneo Apertura. He was replaced by Diego Rivarola at the minute 53. He scored his first goal on 10 July 2011, in a match against Magallanes, for the 2011 Copa Chile. in 2015, he was loaned to La Liga side Elche CF, but the team couldn't register him, so after Maturana was loaned to Alcoyano.

In 2024, Maturana moved abroad again and signed with Nicaraguan club Real Estelí. After a month with them, he returned to Chile and joined San Antonio Unido.

In March 2025, Maturana joined Deportes Melipilla.

In June 2026, Maturana moved to Ecuador and joined Ciudad de Yantzaza in the third level, winning the Campeonato de Segunda Categoría Zamora Chinchipe. In July of the same year, he moved to Guatemalan club Deportivo Fraijanes.

== International career ==
He was named in Chile's senior squad for 2018 FIFA World Cup qualifiers against Paraguay and Bolivia in September 2016.

== Personal life ==
As a child, Maturana lived in a residence from SENAME (National Services for Minors), a questioned Chilean institution due to multiple complaints about all kinds of child abuse there.

== Honours ==
Universidad de Chile

- Primera División de Chile (1): 2011 Apertura, 2011 Clausura
- Copa Sudamericana (1): 2011

Deportes Iquique

- Copa Chile (1): 2013–14

Colo-Colo

- Primera División de Chile (1): 2017 Transición
- Supercopa de Chile (2): 2017, 2018
- Copa Chile (1): 2019

Real Estelí

- Copa Primera (1): 2023

Ciudad de Yantzaza

- Segunda Categoría Zamora Chinchipe (1): 2026
