= Alex Pontons =

Bolivian footballer (born 1994)

Personal information
- Full name: Alex Pontons Paz
- Date of birth: 26 November 1994 (age 31)
- Place of birth: Santa Cruz, Bolivia
- Position: Forward

Team information
- Current team: Oriente Petrolero

Senior career*
Years	Team	Apps	(Gls)
2013–2014	Milan	0	(0)
2013	→ Nocerina (loan)	2	(0)
2014	→ Teramo (loan)		
2014–	Sampdoria	0	(0)
2014	→ Petrolero (loan)	7	(0)
2015–2016	Universitario		
- * Club domestic league appearances and goals as of 14:45, 11 March 2014 (UTC)

Alex Pontons Paz (born 26 November 1994) is a Bolivian footballer who plays for Oriente Petrolero in the Liga de Futbol Profesional Boliviano out loan from Sampdoria.

== Club career ==
A product of the Milan youth academy, Paz joined Nocerina on a season long loan on 25 July 2013 along with fellow Edmund Hottor. He made his debut for the club in a Coppa Italia match against Pordenone, where he started the match.
