= Carlos Áñez =

Bolivian footballer (born 1995)

Personal information
- Full name: Carlos Enrique Áñez Oliva
- Date of birth: July 6, 1995 (age 31)
- Place of birth: Santa Cruz de la Sierra, Bolivia
- Height: 1.75 m (5 ft 9 in)
- Position: Centre back

Team information
- Current team: Club Deportivo Guabirá
- Number: 6

Youth career
- 2011–2013: Oriente Petrolero

Senior career*
Years	Team	Apps	(Gls)
2013–2019	Oriente Petrolero	191	(14)
2020	The Strongest	10	(2)
2021–2022	Wilstermann	61	(3)
2023	Royal Pari	19	(0)
2024	Oriente Petrolero	21	(3)
2025-	Club Deportivo Guabirá	33	(6)

International career^{‡}
2011-	Bolivia U17	4	(0)
2015	Bolivia U20	5	(0)
2019–	Bolivia	6	(0)
- * Club domestic league appearances and goals as of 08:30 (UTC) 26 May 2026 ‡ National team caps and goals as of 8 June 2021

Carlos Añez (born 6 July 1995) is a Bolivian professional footballer who plays for Club Deportivo Guabirá in the Bolivian Primera División.

== Career ==
Añez joined C.D. Jorge Wilstermann ahead of the 2021 season.

== International career ==
On 28 May 2018 Añez started for the Bolivia national football team against the United States national team in Pennsylvania in a friendly.
