= Matías Rodrigo Pérez =

Paraguayan footballer (born 1994)

Personal information
- Full name: Matías Rodrigo Pérez Marín
- Date of birth: 4 January 1994 (age 32)
- Place of birth: Asunción, Paraguay
- Height: 1.92 m (6 ft 4 in)
- Position: Centre back

Team information
- Current team: Sporting B

Youth career
- Nacional Asunción

Senior career*
| Years | Team | Apps | (Gls) |
| 2011–2014 | Nacional Asunción | 18 | (0) |
| 2013 | → Rubio Ñu (loan) | 12 | (1) |
| 2014– | Sporting B | 4 | (0) |

International career^{‡}
| 2010 | Paraguay U17 | 8 | (1) |
| 2012 | Paraguay U20 | 12 | (3) |
- * Club domestic league appearances and goals as of 27 December 2014 ‡ National team caps and goals as of 17 January 2013

Matías Rodrigo Pérez Marín (born 4 January 1994) is a Paraguayan footballer who plays as a centre back for Sporting B.
