= Esther Grande =

Peruvian football club

Esther Grande de Bentín
- Full name: Club Esther Grande de Bentín
- Founded: 1978
- Capacity: 25,000
- League: Copa Perú
Home colours	Away colours

Esther Grande de Bentín, or simply Esther Grande, is a semi-professional Peruvian association football team based in Lurín, a suburb of the capital Lima.

== Honours ==
=== Regional ===
- Liga Mayor de Fútbol de Lima:
  - Winners (1): 1985
  - Runner-up (1): 1982
- Liga Distrital de Surquillo:
  - Winners (2): 2013, 2014
- Liga Distrital del Rímac:
  - Winners (1): 1981

== See also ==
- List of football clubs in Peru
- Peruvian football league system
