= 2011–12 Club Nacional de Football season =

Nacional
2011-12 season
- President: (Uruguay) Ricardo Alarcón
- Manager: (Argentina) Marcelo Gallardo
- Stadium: Estadio Gran Parque Central
- Primera Division: Apertura: 1st Clausura: 5th Overall: Semifinals
- Copa Sudamericana: Second Stage
- Torneo Preparación: Round of 16
- Torneo de Honor: Quarterfinals
- Copa Libertadores: Second Stage
- Top goalscorer: League: Alexander Medina (8 goals); All: Alexander Medina (8 goals)
- Highest home attendance: 60,000 vs. Peñarol (November 20, 2011)
- Lowest home attendance: 15,000 vs. Rentistas (October 9, 2011)
- Average home league attendance: 27,220
| Home colours | Away colours | Third colours |

Club Nacional de Football's 2010–11 season is the club's 112th year of existence and the club's 108th in the top-flight.
Nacional this season going to play the 2011–12 Uruguayan Primera División season, the 2011 Copa Sudamericana and the 2012 Copa Libertadores.

== Squad ==
As of February 7, 2012

| No. | Name | Nationality | Position | Date of birth (age) | Signed from | Notes |
|---|---|---|---|---|---|---|
| 1 | Leonardo Burián | (Uruguay) | GK | January 21, 1984 (age 42) | (Uruguay) Bella Vista | First team goalkeeper |
| 2 | Darwin Torres | (Uruguay) | DF | February 16, 1991 (age 35) | The Academy | Reserve team player |
| 3 | Jadson Viera | (Brazil) | DF | August 4, 1981 (age 45) | (Brazil) Vasco da Gama | AUF player |
| 4 | Christian Núñez | (Uruguay) | DF | September 24, 1982 (age 44) | (Uruguay) Cerro | |
| 5 | Santiago Romero | (Uruguay) | MF | February 15, 1990 (age 36) | The Academy | Reserve team player |
| 6 | Alexis Rolín | (Uruguay) | DF | March 2, 1989 (age 37) | The Academy | |
| 7 | Rafael García | (Uruguay) | MF | January 6, 1989 (age 37) | (Uruguay) Rampla Juniors | |
| 8 | Matías Cabrera | (Uruguay) | MF | May 16, 1986 (age 40) | (Uruguay) Cerro | |
| 9 | Alexander Medina | (Uruguay) | FW | August 8, 1978 (age 48) | (Uruguay) River Plate | Captain |
| 10 | Tabaré Viudez | (Uruguay) | FW | September 8, 1989 (age 37) | (Mexico) Necaxa | |
| 11 | Vicente Sánchez | (Uruguay) | FW | December 7, 1979 (age 46) | (Mexico) América | In on 15 January 2012 |
| 12 | Martín Tejera | (Uruguay) | GK | February 16, 1991 (age 35) | The Academy | |
| 13 | Pablo Álvarez | (Uruguay) | DF | February 7, 1985 (age 41) | (Greece) Panserraikos | In on 3 January 2012 |
| 14 | Diego Placente | (Argentina) | DF | April 24, 1977 (age 49) | (Argentina) San Lorenzo | |
| 15 | Gonzalo Bueno | (Uruguay) | FW | September 1, 1991 (age 35) | The Academy | |
| 16 | Mathías Abero | (Uruguay) | DF | April 9, 1990 (age 36) | (Uruguay) Racing | |
| 17 | Maximiliano Calzada | (Uruguay) | MF | April 21, 1990 (age 36) | The Academy | |
| 18 | Israel Damonte | (Argentina) | MF | January 6, 1982 (age 44) | (Argentina) Godoy Cruz | In on 19 January 2012 |
| 19 | Andrés Scotti | (Uruguay) | DF | December 14, 1975 (age 50) | (Chile) Colo-Colo | In on 3 January 2012 |
| 20 | Álvaro Recoba | (Uruguay) | MF | March 17, 1976 (age 50) | (Uruguay) Danubio | Vice-captain |
| 21 | Matías Vecino | (Uruguay) | MF | August 24, 1991 (age 35) | (Uruguay) Central Español | |
| 22 | Joaquín Boghossian | (Uruguay) | FW | June 19, 1987 (age 39) | (Austria) Red Bull Salzburg | |
| 23 | Facundo Píriz | (Uruguay) | MF | March 27, 1990 (age 36) | The Academy | |
| 24 | Marcos Aguirre | (Argentina) | MF | March 30, 1984 (age 42) | (Argentina) San Martín (San Juan) | In on 12 January 2012 |
| 25 | Jorge Bava | (Uruguay) | GK | January 22, 1982 (age 44) | (Uruguay) Cerro | In on 13 January 2012 |
| – | Rodrigo Muñoz | (Uruguay) | GK | January 22, 1982 (age 44) | (Uruguay) Cerro | Out on 10 January 2012 |
| – | Diego Barboza | (Uruguay) | DF | January 9, 1991 (age 35) | The Academy | Reserve team player |
| – | Sebastián Coates | (Uruguay) | DF | October 7, 1990 (age 36) | The Academy | Out on 26 August 2011 |
| – | Gabriel Marques | (Brazil) | DF | March 31, 1983 (age 43) | (Uruguay) River Plate | Out on 29 December 2011 |
| – | Gonzalo Godoy | (Uruguay) | DF | January 17, 1988 (age 38) | (Uruguay) Cerro | Out on 5 January 2012 |
| – | Sebastián Gorga | (Uruguay) | DF | April 6, 1994 (age 32) | The Academy | Reserve team player |
| – | Maximiliano Moreira | (Uruguay) | DF | June 11, 1994 (age 32) | The Academy | Reserve team player |
| – | Nicolás Olivera | (Uruguay) | DF | February 17, 1993 (age 33) | The Academy | Reserve team player |
| – | Fernando Poclaba | (Argentina) | DF | January 23, 1990 (age 36) | (Argentina) Racing | Out on 31 December 2012 |
| – | Agustín Tabárez | (Uruguay) | DF | October 15, 1994 (age 32) | The Academy | Reserve team player |
| – | Anderson Silva | (Brazil) | MF | August 28, 1982 (age 44) | (England) Barnsley | End of contract on 31 December 2011 |
| – | Ayrton Bone | (Uruguay) | MF | May 27, 1994 (age 32) | The Academy | Reserve team player |
| – | Carlos De Pena | (Uruguay) | MF | March 11, 1992 (age 34) | The Academy | Reserve team player |
| – | Hugo Dorrego | (Uruguay) | MF | May 9, 1993 (age 33) | The Academy | Reserve team player |
| – | Damián Eroza | (Uruguay) | MF | March 22, 1993 (age 33) | The Academy | Reserve team player |
| – | Horacio Peralta | (Uruguay) | MF | June 3, 1982 (age 44) | (Uruguay) Central Español | End of contract on 31 December 2011 |
| – | Gastón Pereiro | (Uruguay) | MF | June 11, 1995 (age 31) | The Academy | Reserve team player |
| – | Santiago Pereyra | (Uruguay) | MF | June 2, 1992 (age 34) | The Academy | Reserve team player |
| – | Santiago Saúl | (Uruguay) | MF | January 8, 1993 (age 33) | The Academy | Reserve team player |
| – | Matías Sosa | (Argentina) | MF | June 26, 1992 (age 34) | (Spain) Sporting de Gijón B | End of contract on 31 December 2011 |
| – | Gonzalo Vega | (Uruguay) | MF | June 29, 1992 (age 34) | The Academy | Reserve team player |
| – | Leandro Barcia | (Uruguay) | FW | October 8, 1993 (age 33) | The Academy | Reserve team player |
| – | Lucas Cavallini | (Canada) | FW | December 28, 1992 (age 33) | The Academy | Reserve team player |
| – | Renato César | (Uruguay) | FW | August 16, 1993 (age 33) | The Academy | |
| – | Jonathan Charquero | (Uruguay) | FW | February 21, 1989 (age 37) | (Uruguay) Montevideo Wanderers | Out on 27 December 2011 |
| – | Sergio Cortelezzi | (Uruguay) | FW | September 9, 1994 (age 32) | The Academy | Reserve team player |
| – | Richard Porta | (Australia) | FW | January 8, 1985 (age 41) | (United Arab Emirates) Al Wasl | Out on 14 October 2011; In on 9 January, 2012 |
| – | Nicolás López | (Uruguay) | FW | September 9, 1993 (age 33) | The Academy | On 22 August 2011 he escaped with his representative Pablo Bentancur and his family to Italy |
| – | Renzo López | (Uruguay) | FW | April 16, 1994 (age 32) | The Academy | Reserve team player |
| – | Juan Cruz Mascia | (Uruguay) | FW | January 3, 1994 (age 32) | (Uruguay) Miramar Misiones | In on 19 January 2012 |
| – | Rodrigo Roque | (Uruguay) | FW | May 3, 1991 (age 35) | The Academy | Reserve team player |

=== Winter transfers ===
Players In
| Name | Nat | Pos | Moving from |
|---|---|---|---|
| Álvaro Recoba | URU | MF | (Uruguay) Danubio |
| Diego Placente | ARG | DF | (Argentina) San Lorenzo |
| Raúl Poclaba | ARG | MF | (Argentina) Racing |
| Rafael García | URU | MF | (Uruguay) Rampla Juniors |
| Mathías Abero | URU | DF | (Uruguay) Racing |
| Matías Sosa | ARG | MF | (Spain) Sporting de Gijón B |
| Alexander Medina | URU | FW | (Uruguay) River Plate |
| Matías Vecino | URU | MF | (Uruguay) Central Español |
| Joaquín Boghossian | URU | FW | (Austria) Red Bull Salzburg |

Players Out
| Name | Nat | Pos | Moving to |
|---|---|---|---|
| Marcelo Gallardo | ARG | MF | Retired |
| Santiago García | URU | FW | (Brazil) Atlético Paranaense |
| Carlão | BRA | DF | (Brazil) Duque de Caxias |
| Robert Flores | URU | MF | (Bulgaria) Litex Lovech |
| Alejandro Lembo | URU | DF | (Argentina) Belgrano |
| Nicolás Vigneri | URU | FW | (Ecuador) Emelec |
| Bruno Fornaroli | URU | FW | (Paraguay) Olimpia |
| Flavio Córdoba | COL | DF | (Colombia) Millonarios |
| Mauricio Pereyra | URU | MF | (Argentina) Lanús |
| Julián Perujo | URU | DF | (Uruguay) Defensor Sporting |
| Sebastián Coates | URU | DF | (England) Liverpool |
| Richard Porta | AUS | FW | (United Arab Emirates) Al Wasl |
| Nicolás López | URU | FW | (Italy) Roma |

=== Summer transfers ===
Players In
| Name | Nat | Pos | Moving from |
|---|---|---|---|
| Pablo Álvarez | URU | DF | (Greece) Panserraikos |
| Andrés Scotti | URU | DF | (Chile) Colo-Colo |
| Richard Porta | AUS | FW | (United Arab Emirates) Al Wasl |
| Marcos Aguirre | ARG | MF | (Argentina) San Martín (San Juan) |
| Jorge Bava | URU | GK | (Argentina) Rosario Central |
| Vicente Sánchez | URU | FW | (Mexico) América |
| Juan Cruz Mascia | URU | FW | (Uruguay) Miramar Misiones |
| Israel Damonte | URU | MF | (Argentina) Godoy Cruz |

Players Out
| Name | Nat | Pos | Moving to |
|---|---|---|---|
| Jonathan Charquero | URU | FW | (Peru) Alianza Lima |
| Gabriel Marques | BRA | DF | (Uruguay) River Plate |
| Horacio Peralta | URU | MF | Free agent |
| Anderson Silva | BRA | MF | Free agent |
| Matías Sosa | ARG | MF | (Uruguay) River Plate |
| Fernando Poclaba | ARG | MF | (Argentina) Racing |
| Rodrigo Muñoz | URU | GK | (Paraguay) Libertad |
| Gonzalo Godoy | URU | DF | (Uruguay) Cerro |

== Player statistics ==
=== Team stats ===
| | Primera División | Copa Sudamericana | Torneo Preparación | Torneo de Honor | Copa Libertadores |
|---|---|---|---|---|---|
| Games played | 21 | 2 | 1 | 1 | 4 |
| Games won | 12 | 0 | 0 | 0 | 2 |
| Games drawn | 6 | 0 | 0 | 1 | 0 |
| Games lost | 3 | 2 | 1 | 0 | 2 |
| Goals for | 43 | 0 | 2 | 1 | 4 |
| Goals against | 21 | 2 | 3 | 1 | 4 |
| Players used | 34 | 14 | 18 | 16 | 21 |
| Yellow cards | 60 | 7 | 3 | 1 | 13 |
| Red cards | 5 | 0 | 0 | 0 | 2 |

Last updated: 31 March
Source: Competitive matches

=== Squad stats ===
Updated on 31 March 2012
Players in italics left the team during the season.

| | | | Uruguayan Primera División | | | | Copa Sudamericana | | | | Torneo Preparación | | | | Torneo de Honor | | | | Copa Libertadores | | | | Total | | | |
| Nation | No. | Name | GS | App. | Min. | Goal | GS | App. | Min. | Goal | GS | App. | Min. | Goal | GS | App. | Min. | Goal | GS | App. | Min. | Goal | GS | App. | Min. | Goal |
Goalkeepers
| (Uruguay) | 1 | Leonardo Burián | 7 | 7 | 664 | –10 | | | | | | | | | | | | | 4 | 4 | 378 | –4 | 11 | 11 | 1043 | –14 |
| (Uruguay) | 12 | Martín Tejera | | | | | | | | | 1 | 1 | 96 | –3 | 1 | 1 | 95 | –1 | | | | | 2 | 2 | 191 | –4 |
| (Uruguay) | — | Rodrigo Muñoz | 14 | 14 | 1313 | –11 | 2 | 2 | 144 | –3 | | | | | | | | | | | | | 16 | 16 | 1457 | –14 |
Defenders
| (Uruguay) | 2 | Darwin Torres | 9 | 10 | 894 | | | | | | | | | | | | | | 1 | 1 | 94 | | 10 | 11 | 988 | |
| (Brazil) | 3 | Jadson Viera | 13 | 14 | 1172 | | | | | | | | | | | | | | | 1 | 49 | | 13 | 15 | 1175 | |
| (Uruguay) | 4 | Christian Núñez | 14 | 14 | 1307 | | 2 | 2 | 144 | | | | | | | | | | 4 | 4 | 337 | | 20 | 20 | 1788 | |
| (Uruguay) | 6 | Alexis Rolín | 19 | 19 | 1760 | 1 | 2 | 2 | 144 | | | | | | | | | | 4 | 3 | 378 | | 25 | 25 | 2282 | 1 |
| (Uruguay) | 13 | Pablo Álvarez | 1 | 1 | 94 | | | | | | | | | | | | | | | | | | 1 | 1 | 94 | |
| (Argentina) | 14 | Diego Placente | 12 | 12 | 827 | | 2 | 2 | 144 | | | | | | | | | | 3 | 3 | 328 | | 16 | 16 | 1399 | |
| (Uruguay) | 16 | Mathías Abero | 10 | 14 | 918 | 4 | 2 | 2 | 144 | | | | | | | | | | | 3 | 98 | | 12 | 19 | 1170 | 4 |
| (Uruguay) | 19 | Andrés Scotti | 3 | 3 | 283 | | | | | | | | | | | | | | 4 | 4 | 329 | | 7 | 7 | 612 | |
| (Uruguay) | — | Diego Barboza | | | | | | | | | 1 | 1 | 47 | | 1 | 1 | 95 | | | | | | 2 | 2 | 142 | |
| (Uruguay) | — | Sebastián Coates | 1 | 1 | 95 | | | | | | | | | | | | | | | | | | 1 | 1 | 95 | |
| (Brazil) | — | Gabriel Marques | 4 | 5 | 401 | | | | | | | | | | | | | | | | | | 4 | 5 | 401 | |
| (Uruguay) | — | Gonzalo Godoy | 3 | 4 | 302 | | 2 | 2 | 144 | | | | | | | | | | | | | | 5 | 6 | 446 | |
| (Uruguay) | — | Sebastián Gorga | | | | | | | | | 1 | 1 | 96 | | 1 | 1 | 95 | | | | | | 2 | 2 | 191 | |
| (Uruguay) | — | Maximiliano Moreira | | | | | | | | | 1 | 1 | 96 | | 1 | 1 | 95 | | | | | | 2 | 2 | 191 | |
| (Uruguay) | — | Nicolás Olivera | | | | | | | | | | 1 | 49 | | | | | | | | | | 1 | 1 | 47 | |
| (Argentina) | — | Fernando Poclaba | 1 | 1 | 46 | | | | | | | | | | | | | | | | | | 1 | 1 | 46 | |
| (Uruguay) | — | Agustín Tabárez | | | | | | | | | 1 | 1 | 96 | | 1 | 1 | 95 | | | | | | 1 | 1 | 191 | |
Midfielders
| (Uruguay) | 5 | Santiago Romero | 2 | 3 | 214 | | | | | | | | | | | | | | 2 | 3 | 175 | | 4 | 6 | 389 | |
| (Uruguay) | 7 | Rafael García | 1 | 1 | 95 | | | | | | | | | | | | | | | | | | 1 | 1 | 95 | |
| (Uruguay) | 8 | Matías Cabrera | 17 | 17 | 1493 | 2 | 2 | 2 | 144 | | | | | | | | | | 2 | 2 | 190 | | 21 | 21 | 1827 | 2 |
| (Uruguay) | 17 | Maximiliano Calzada | 11 | 12 | 947 | | | 1 | 23 | | | | | | | | | | 4 | 4 | 347 | | 15 | 17 | 1316 | |
| (Argentina) | 18 | Israel Damonte | 3 | 3 | 285 | | | | | | | | | | | | | | 3 | 3 | 249 | | 6 | 6 | 534 | |
| (Uruguay) | 20 | Álvaro Recoba | 2 | 16 | 742 | 4 | | 1 | 22 | | | | | | | | | | | 4 | 138 | | 2 | 21 | 956 | 4 |
| (Uruguay) | 21 | Matías Vecino | 9 | 12 | 659 | 3 | | | | | | | | | | | | | 1 | 1 | 80 | | 10 | 13 | 739 | 3 |
| (Uruguay) | 23 | Facundo Píriz | 18 | 18 | 1466 | | 2 | 2 | 111 | | | | | | | | | | | 1 | 55 | | 20 | 21 | 1632 | |
| (Argentina) | 24 | Marcos Aguirre | | 2 | 53 | | | | | | | | | | | | | | 1 | 1 | 46 | 1 | 1 | 3 | 99 | 1 |
| (Brazil) | — | Anderson Silva | 3 | 3 | 111 | | | | | | | | | | | | | | | | | | 3 | 3 | 111 | |
| (Uruguay) | — | Ayrton Bone | | | | | | | | | 1 | 1 | 47 | | 1 | 1 | 49 | | | | | | 2 | 2 | 96 | |
| (Uruguay) | — | Carlos De Pena | | | | | | | | | 1 | 1 | 47 | | 1 | 1 | 46 | | | | | | 2 | 2 | 93 | |
| (Uruguay) | — | Hugo Dorrego | | | | | | | | | 1 | 1 | 16 | | 1 | 1 | 22 | 1 | | | | | 2 | 2 | 38 | 1 |
| (Uruguay) | — | Damián Eroza | | | | | | | | | 1 | 1 | 80 | | 1 | 1 | 95 | | | | | | 2 | 2 | 175 | |
| (Uruguay) | — | Horacio Peralta | 2 | 2 | 104 | | | | | | | | | | | | | | | | | | 2 | 2 | 104 | |
| (Uruguay) | — | Gastón Pereiro | | | | | | | | | 1 | 1 | 36 | | 1 | 1 | 22 | | | | | | 2 | 2 | 58 | |
| (Uruguay) | — | Santiago Pereyra | | | | | | | | | 1 | 1 | 49 | 1 | 1 | 1 | 73 | | | | | | 2 | 2 | 122 | 1 |
| (Uruguay) | — | Santiago Saúl | | | | | | | | | 1 | 1 | 49 | | 1 | 1 | 72 | | | | | | 2 | 2 | 121 | |
| (Argentina) | — | Matías Sosa | 7 | 7 | 409 | | | | | | | | | | | | | | | | | | 7 | 7 | 409 | |
| (Uruguay) | — | Gonzalo Vega | | | | | | | | | 1 | 1 | 49 | | 1 | 1 | 46 | | | | | | 2 | 2 | 95 | |
Forwards
| (Uruguay) | 9 | Alexander Medina | 11 | 15 | 1017 | 8 | | 2 | 15 | | | | | | | | | | 1 | 2 | 41 | | 12 | 19 | 1152 | 8 |
| (Uruguay) | 10 | Tabaré Viudez | 15 | 15 | 1258 | 6 | 2 | 2 | 143 | | | | | | | | | | 4 | 4 | 378 | 1 | 21 | 21 | 1732 | 7 |
| (Uruguay) | 11 | Vicente Sánchez | 3 | 5 | 202 | | | | | | | | | | | | | | 4 | 4 | 323 | 1 | 7 | 9 | 525 | 1 |
| (Uruguay) | 15 | Gonzalo Bueno | 3 | 15 | 723 | 5 | | | | | | | | | | | | | 1 | 2 | 103 | | 4 | 17 | 826 | 5 |
| (Uruguay) | 22 | Joaquín Boghossian | 6 | 12 | 677 | 5 | 2 | 2 | 129 | | | | | | | | | | | 1 | 80 | | 8 | 15 | 886 | 5 |
| (Uruguay) | — | Leandro Barcia | | | | | | | | | 1 | 1 | 36 | | 1 | 1 | 34 | | | | | | 2 | 2 | 70 | |
| (Canada) | — | Lucas Cavallini | | | | | | | | | 1 | 1 | 49 | | 1 | 1 | 49 | | | | | | 2 | 2 | 98 | |
| (Uruguay) | — | Renato César | 3 | 5 | 238 | | | | | | | | | | | | | | | | | | 3 | 5 | 238 | |
| (Uruguay) | — | Jonathan Charquero | | 1 | 15 | | | | | | | | | | | | | | | | | | | 1 | 15 | |
| (Uruguay) | — | Sergio Cortelezzi | | | | | | | | | 1 | 1 | 47 | | | | | | | | | | 1 | 1 | 47 | |
| (Uruguay) | — | Nicolás López | | 2 | 68 | | | | | | | | | | | | | | | | | | | 2 | 68 | |
| (Uruguay) | — | Renzo López | | | | | | | | | 1 | 1 | 60 | 1 | 1 | 1 | 61 | | | | | | 2 | 2 | 121 | 1 |
| (Australia) | — | Richard Porta | 6 | 7 | 445 | 4 | 2 | 2 | 119 | | | | | | | | | | | | | | 8 | 9 | 584 | 4 |

=== Disciplinary records ===
Players in italics left the team during the season. Last updated on 31 March 2012.

| No. | Pos | Nat | Name | Uruguayan Primera División | | | Copa Sudamericana | | | Torneo Preparación | | | Torneo de Honor | | | Copa Libertadores | | | Total | | |
| No. | Pos | Nat | Name | Yellow card | (yellow card) (yellow-red card) | Red card | Yellow card | (yellow card) (yellow-red card) | Red card | Yellow card | (yellow card) (yellow-red card) | Red card | Yellow card | (yellow card) (yellow-red card) | Red card | Yellow card | (yellow card) (yellow-red card) | Red card | Yellow card | (yellow card) (yellow-red card) | Red card |
| 2 | DF | (Uruguay) | Darwin Torres | 5 | | | | | | | | | | | | 1 | | | 6 | | |
| 3 | DF | (Brazil) | Jadson Viera | 4 | 1 | 1 | | | | | | | | | | | | | 4 | 1 | 1 |
| 4 | DF | (Uruguay) | Christian Núñez | 2 | | | | | | | | | | | | | | | 2 | | |
| 5 | MF | (Uruguay) | Santiago Romero | | | | | | | | | | | | | 1 | | | 1 | | |
| 6 | DF | (Uruguay) | Alexis Rolín | 7 | | | 1 | | | | | | | | | | | | 8 | | |
| 8 | MF | (Uruguay) | Matías Cabrera | 5 | | | 1 | | | | | | | | | 1 | | | 7 | | |
| 9 | FW | (Uruguay) | Alexander Medina | 4 | | 1 | | | | | | | | | | | | | 4 | | 1 |
| 10 | FW | (Uruguay) | Tabaré Viudez | 2 | | | | | | | | | | | | 2 | | | 4 | | |
| 11 | FW | (Uruguay) | Vicente Sánchez | 1 | | | | | | | | | | | | 1 | | | 2 | | |
| 12 | GK | (Uruguay) | Martín Tejera | | | | | | | 1 | | | | | | | | | 1 | | |
| 14 | DF | (Argentina) | Diego Placente | 6 | | | 1 | | | | | | | | | 2 | | 1 | 9 | | 1 |
| 16 | DF | (Uruguay) | Mathías Abero | 2 | | | | | | | | | | | | | | | 2 | | |
| 17 | MF | (Uruguay) | Maximiliano Calzada | | | | | | | | | | | | | 1 | | | 1 | | |
| 18 | MF | (Argentina) | Israel Damonte | 1 | | | | | | | | | | | | 2 | 1 | | 3 | 1 | |
| 19 | DF | (Uruguay) | Andrés Scotti | 1 | | | | | | | | | | | | 1 | | | 2 | | |
| 20 | MF | (Uruguay) | Álvaro Recoba | 1 | | | | | | | | | | | | | | | 1 | | |
| 21 | MF | (Uruguay) | Matías Vecino | 1 | | | | | | | | | | | | | | | 1 | | |
| 22 | FW | (Uruguay) | Joaquín Boghossian | 2 | | | 1 | | | | | | | | | | | | 3 | | |
| 23 | MF | (Uruguay) | Facundo Píriz | 4 | 2 | | 1 | | | | | | | | | | | | 5 | 2 | |
| — | DF | (Brazil) | Gabriel Marques | 3 | | | | | | | | | | | | | | | 2 | | |
| — | DF | (Uruguay) | Gonzalo Godoy | 1 | | | 1 | | | | | | | | | | | | 2 | | |
| — | DF | (Uruguay) | Maximiliano Moreira | | | | | | | 1 | | | | | | | | | 1 | | |
| — | DF | (Argentina) | Fernando Poclaba | 1 | | | | | | | | | | | | | | | 1 | | |
| — | MF | (Brazil) | Anderson Silva | 1 | | | | | | | | | | | | | | | 1 | | |
| — | MF | (Uruguay) | Horacio Peralta | 1 | | | | | | | | | | | | | | | 1 | | |
| — | MF | (Argentina) | Matías Sosa | 1 | | | | | | | | | | | | | | | 1 | | |
| — | FW | (Canada) | Lucas Cavallini | | | | | | | 1 | | | 1 | | | | | | 2 | | |
| — | FW | (Australia) | Richard Porta | 1 | | | 1 | | | | | | | | | | | | 2 | | |
| | | | TOTALS | 57 | 3 | 2 | 7 | | | 3 | | | 1 | | | 12 | 1 | 1 | 80 | 4 | 3 |

== Club ==
=== Starting XI ===
| No. | Pos. | Nat. | Name | MS | Notes |
|---|---|---|---|---|---|
| 1 | GK | (Uruguay) | Burián | 9 | Tejera has two starts |
| 4 | RB | (Uruguay) | Núñez | 18 | Barboza has two starts Álvarez has one start |
| 3 | CB | (Brazil) | Jadson Viera | 11 | Gorga has two starts Scotti has five starts |
| 6 | CB | (Uruguay) | Rolín | 22 | Tabárez has two starts |
| 14 | LB | (Argentina) | Placente | 17 | Torres has eight starts Moreira has two starts |
| 23 | DM | (Uruguay) | Píriz | 19 | Romero has two starts Bone has one start Pereyra has one start |
| 17 | DM | (Uruguay) | Calzada | 14 | Eroza has two starts Damonte has five starts |
| 8 | RM | (Uruguay) | Cabrera | 19 | Vecino has eight starts César has two starts De Pena has two starts Aguirre has one start |
| 16 | LM | (Uruguay) | Abero | 10 | Recoba has two start |
| 10 | CF | (Uruguay) | Viudez | 22 | Sánchez has seven starts Bueno has three starts Saúl has two starts Vega has one start |
| 9 | CF | (Uruguay) | Medina | 13 | Boghossian has seven starts Porta has five starts López has two starts Cortelezzi has one start |

=== Current technical staff ===
| Position | Staff |
|---|---|
| First team head coach | (Argentina) Marcelo Gallardo |
| Assistant coach | (Argentina) Matías Biscay (Argentina) Hernán Buján |
| Goalkeeping coach | (Uruguay) Tabaré Alonso |
| Physical fitness coach | (Uruguay) Marcelo Tulbovitz |
| Director of football | (Uruguay) Daniel Henriquez |

Last updated: 07 July
Source: Nacional Official Website

== Competitions ==
=== Pre-season ===
| 20 July 2011 Colonia tour | Plaza Colonia (Uruguay) | 0–9 | (Uruguay) Nacional | Colonia, Uruguay |
| 15:30 UTC-03:00 | | Report | Viudez 35', 44'; Charquero 51', 73'; Bueno 55', 89'; López 59', 66', 90+2' | Stadium: Estadio Profesor Alberto Suppici; Attendance: 12,000; Referee: Andrés Cunha (Uruguay) |

| 23 July 2011 Colonia tour | Nacional (Uruguay) | 2–2 | (Argentina) Godoy Cruz | Colonia, Uruguay |
| 10:00 UTC-03:00 | López 19', 35' | Report | Ramírez 72' (pen.); García 85' | Stadium: Estadio Profesor Alberto Suppici; Attendance: 12,000; Referee: Peter Cajas (Uruguay) |

| 27 July 2011 Maldonado tour | Nacional (Uruguay) | 3–0 | (Uruguay) Bella Vista | Maldonado, Uruguay |
| 16:00 UTC-03:00 | Bueno 43'; Porta 65' (pen.), 81' | Report | | Stadium: Estadio Domingo Burgueño; Attendance: 10,000; Referee: Héctor Martínez (Uruguay) |

| 29 July 2011 Argentina tour Copa Ciudad de Rosario | Rosario Central (Argentina) | 0–0 (5–4 p) | (Uruguay) Nacional | Rosario, Argentina |
| 19:00 UTC-03:00 | Mozzo (yellow card) 23' | Report | | Stadium: Estadio Gigante de Arroyito; Attendance: 20,000; Referee: Federico Beligoy (Argentina) |
| | Penalties |
| | Rivero (penalty scored); Castillejos (penalty scored); Carrizo (penalty scored); Figueroa (penalty missed); Mozzo (penalty scored); Vallejos (penalty missed); Broun (penalty scored) | | Peralta (penalty scored); Cabrera (penalty scored); Píriz (penalty scored); Charquero (penalty scored); Muñoz (penalty missed); Anderson Silva (penalty missed); Jadson Viera (penalty missed) |

| 3 August 2011 Return to Montevideo | Nacional (Uruguay) | 2–3 | (Uruguay) Montevideo Wanderers | Montevideo, Uruguay |
| 11:00 UTC-03:00 | López 15'; Peralta 18' | Report | Peinado 7'; Vázquez 41'; Cabrera 62' | Stadium: Complejo Nacional Universitario; Attendance: 50; Referee: Daniel Fedorczuk (Uruguay) |

| 6 August 2011 Argentina tour | River Plate (Argentina) | 3–3 | (Uruguay) Nacional | Buenos Aires, Argentina |
| 09:30 UTC-03:00 | Sánchez 78'; Cavenaghi 83' (pen.), 85' | Report | Porta 23' (pen.), 53'; Sosa 70' | Stadium: Estadio Monumental Antonio V. Liberti; Attendance: 0 Referee: Héctor Baldassi (Argentina) |

| 6 August 2011 Argentina tour | River Plate (Argentina) | 3–1 | (Uruguay) Nacional | Buenos Aires, Argentina |
| 12:00 UTC-03:00 | Bou 40' (pen.); Villalva 65', 75' | Report | López 30' | Stadium: Estadio Monumental Antonio V. Liberti; Attendance: 0 Referee: Héctor Baldassi (Argentina) |

=== Pan American Games break ===
| 22 October 2011 | Nacional (Uruguay) | 0–2 | (Uruguay) Racing | Montevideo, Uruguay |
| 10:00 UTC-02:00 | | Report | Ortiz 17'; Panzariello 35' | Stadium: Estadio Gran Parque Central; Attendance: 3,000; Referee: Héctor Martínez (Uruguay) |

| 29 October 2011 | Nacional (Uruguay) | 1–3 | (Uruguay) Danubio | Montevideo, Uruguay |
| 10:00 UTC-02:00 | Boghossian 77' | Report | Melo 42'; S. Píriz 70'; Melazzi 82' (pen.) | Stadium: Estadio Gran Parque Central; Attendance: 0 Referee: Yimmi Álvarez (Uruguay) |

=== Copa Bimbo ===
| 13 January 2012 Semifinals | Nacional (Uruguay) | 1—1 (5—6 p) | (Uruguay) Peñarol | Montevideo, Uruguay |
| 22:30 UTC-02:00 | Abero (red card) 36'; Boghossian 37' (pen.); Torres (yellow card) 65'; Rolín (yellow card) 66' | Report | Aguiar (yellow card) 20'; Cristóforo 25'; Valdez (red card) 36'; W. López (yellow card) 90' | Stadium: Estadio Centenario; Attendance: 40,000; Referee: Héctor Martínez (Uruguay) |
| | Penalties |
| | Viudez (penalty scored); Rolín (penalty scored); Romero (penalty scored); Núñez (penalty missed); García (penalty scored); Bueno (penalty scored); R. López (penalty missed) | | Amodio (penalty missed); Albín (penalty scored); Pérez (penalty scored); López (penalty scored); Cristóforo (penalty scored); González (penalty scored); Carini (penalty scored) |

| 15 January 2012 Third place play-off | Universidad San Martín (Peru) | 1—2 | (Uruguay) Nacional | Montevideo, Uruguay |
| 20:00 UTC-02:00 | Espinoza (yellow card) 4'; Perea 9' | Report | Recoba 15'; Vecino 37' | Stadium: Estadio Centenario; Attendance: 5,000; Referee: Gustavo Siegler (Uruguay) |

=== Copa Comunicaciones Antel ===
| 19 January 2012 Semifinals | Nacional (Uruguay) | 1–0 | (Uruguay) Peñarol | Montevideo, Uruguay |
| 22:00 UTC-02:00 | Calzada (yellow card) 26' (yellow-red card) 63'; Jadson Viera 57' (yellow card) 70'; Núñez (yellow card) 74' | Report | Freitas (yellow card) 6'; Rodríguez (yellow card) 38'; Amodio (yellow card) 54'; González (yellow card) 80' | Stadium: Estadio Centenario; Attendance: 35,000; Referee: Martín Vázquez (Uruguay) |

| 21 January 2012 Final | Olimpia (Paraguay) | 2–0 | (Uruguay) Nacional | Montevideo, Uruguay |
| 21:00 UTC-02:00 | Contreras 54'; L. Caballero 87' | Report | | Stadium: Estadio Centenario; Attendance: 15,000; Referee: Daniel Fedorczuk (Uruguay) |

=== Inter-tournaments Tour ===
| 26 January 2012 Chile tour Noche Azul | Universidad de Chile | 1–1 | (Uruguay) Nacional | Santiago, Chile |
| 22:30 UTC-03:00 | Lichnovsky (yellow card) 27'; González (yellow card) 79'; Morales 79' | Report | Recoba 28' (pen.); Damonte (yellow card) 30'; Medina (yellow card) 33'; Píriz (yellow card) 61'; Rolín (yellow card) 72'; Placente (yellow card) 77'; Scotti (yellow card) 84'; Boghossian (red card) 87' | Stadium: Estadio Nacional de Chile; Attendance: 25,000; Referee: Jorge Osorio (Chile) |
Note: Nacional won the Noche Azul for be the away team.

| 28 January 2012 Chile tour Noche Oro y Cielo | Everton (Chile) | 3–5 | (Uruguay) Nacional | Viña del Mar, Chile |
| 22:15 UTC-03:00 | Alegría 12'; Jadson Viera 48' (o.g.); Acuña 82' (pen.) | Report | Romero 8', 54'; Alegría 55' (o.g.); Sánchez 60'; Bueno 63' | Stadium: Estadio Sausalito; Attendance: 12,000; Referee: Claudio Aranda (Chile) |

=== Overall ===
| Competition | Started round | Current position / round | Final position / round | First match | Last match |
|---|---|---|---|---|---|
| Uruguayan Primera División | Regular season | Semifinals | | 14 August 2011 | |
| Copa Sudamericana | Second Stage | — | Second Stage | 13 September 2011 | 21 September 2011 |
| Torneo Preparación | Round of 16 | — | Round of 16 | 29 January 2012 | |
| Torneo de Honor | Quarterfinals | — | Quarterfinals | 1 February 2012 | |
| Copa Libertadores | Second Stage | Group Stage | | 8 January 2012 | |

Updated to match played 2 February
Source: Competitions

=== Uruguayan Primera División ===
==== Torneo Apertura ====
| Pos | Team | Pld | W | D | L | GF | GA | GD | Pts | Qualification |
|---|---|---|---|---|---|---|---|---|---|---|
| 1 | Nacional (C) | 15 | 9 | 5 | 1 | 30 | 11 | +19 | 32 | Championship Playoffs |
| 2 | Danubio | 15 | 8 | 5 | 2 | 19 | 8 | +11 | 31 (Note: Danubio won the points of the match against Racing because Racing fielded an ineligible player (Marcelo Sosa).) | |
| 3 | Peñarol | 15 | 9 | 3 | 3 | 30 | 12 | +18 | 30 | |
| 4 | River Plate | 15 | 8 | 4 | 3 | 22 | 17 | +5 | 28 | |
| 5 | Cerro Largo | 15 | 8 | 3 | 4 | 18 | 16 | +2 | 27 | |

Source: AUF
Rules for classification: 1) points; 2) goal difference; 3) number of goals scored.
(C) Champions

===== Matches =====
| 14 August 2011 Round 1 | River Plate | 3–3 | Nacional | Montevideo, Uruguay |
| 15:30 UTC-03:00 | Pírez (yellow card) 26'; Janderson 34' (yellow card) 83'; Olivera 41'; Porras (yellow card) 54' (yellow-red card) 62'; Franco 88' | Report | Poclaba (yellow card) 38'; Viudez 58'; Rolín (yellow card) 64'; Porta 67' (yellow card) 73'; Recoba 76'; Placente (yellow card) 90' | Stadium: Estadio Centenario; Attendance: 30,000; Referee: Martín Vázquez |

| 20 August 2011 Round 2 | Nacional | 2–2 | Defensor Sporting | Montevideo, Uruguay |
| 15:30 UTC-03:00 | Gabriel Marques (yellow card) 21'; Porta 44' (pen.); Jadson Viera (yellow card) 47'; Medina (red card) 67'; Placente (yellow card) 84'; Recoba 90+1' | Report | I. Risso 6', 47'; Fleurquin (yellow card) 11'; Irrazabal (yellow card) 72'; Alemán (yellow card) 90' | Stadium: Estadio Gran Parque Central; Attendance: 20,000; Referee: Daniel Fedorczuk |

| 27 August 2011 Round 3 | Cerro | 0–0 | Nacional | Montevideo, Uruguay |
| 15:30 UTC-03:00 | Filgueira (yellow card) 11'; Suárez (yellow card) 51' | Report | Jadson Viera (yellow card) 11'; Gabriel Marques (yellow card) 58'; Rolín (yellow card) 75'; Cabrera (yellow card) 86' | Stadium: Estadio Luis Troccoli; Attendance: 8,000; Referee: Héctor Martínez |

| 4 September 2011 Round 4 | Nacional | 3–2 | Racing | Montevideo, Uruguay |
| 15:30 UTC-03:00 | Matías Sosa (yellow card) 22'; Jadson Viera (red card) 30'; Placente (yellow card) 47'; Boghossian 55', 62'; Viudez (yellow card) 60' (goal) 86' | Report | Crosa 34' (pen.), 87'; Marcelo Sosa (yellow card) 40'; Hernández (yellow card) 58' | Stadium: Estadio Gran Parque Central; Attendance: 19,000; Referee: Jorge Larrionda |

| 10 September 2011 Round 5 | Danubio | 1–1 | Nacional | Montevideo, Uruguay |
| 15:30 UTC-03:00 | Malrrechaufe 32' (yellow card) 81'; Guzmán (yellow card) 37'; S. Píriz (yellow card) 88' | Report | Boghossian 24' (pen.); Calzada (yellow card) 62'; Gabriel Marques (yellow card) 66'; F. Píriz (yellow card) 69' (yellow-red card) 84' | Stadium: Jardines Del Hipódromo; Attendance: 8,000; Referee: Roberto Silvera |

| 17 September 2011 Round 6 | Nacional | 4–0 | Cerro Largo | Montevideo, Uruguay |
| 15:30 UTC-03:00 | Leites 17' (o.g.); Placente (yellow card) 57'; Boghossian (yellow card) 61'; Bueno 68'; Godoy (yellow card) 71'; Medina 78'; Anderson Silva (yellow card) 81'; Porta 83' | Report | Leites (yellow card) 50' (yellow-red card) 73'; Tellechea (yellow card) 88' | Stadium: Estadio Gran Parque Central; Attendance: 23,000; Referee: Fernando Falce |

| 25 September 2011 Round 7 | Bella Vista | 1–0 | Nacional | Montevideo, Uruguay |
| 15:30 UTC-03:00 | Gutiérrez (yellow card) 20'; Varela 30'; Díaz (yellow card) 51'; Ramis (yellow card) 68'; Oteras (yellow card) 85' | Report | Abero (yellow card) 21'; Viudez (yellow card) 66' | Stadium: Estadio Centenario; Attendance: 15,000; Referee: Líber Prudente |

| 1 October 2011 Round 8 | Cerrito | 0–3 | Nacional | Montevideo, Uruguay |
| 17:00 UTC-03:00 | Salgueiro (yellow card) 26'; Da Silva (yellow card) 31' (yellow-red card) 45+1'; Pérez (yellow card) 57' | Report | Medina 27'; Torres (yellow card) 46'; Viudez 65'; Recoba 85' | Stadium: Estadio Centenario; Attendance: 12,000; Referee: Martín Vázquez |

| 9 October 2011 Round 9 | Nacional | 3–0 | Rentistas | Montevideo, Uruguay |
| 17:00 UTC-02:00 | Medina 2'; Abero 12'; Píriz (yellow card) 52'; Rolín (yellow card) 55'; Boghossian 85' | Report | Bonilla (yellow card) 38'; Cabrera (yellow card) 59' | Stadium: Estadio Gran Parque Central; Attendance: 15,000; Referee: Javier Bentancor |

| 14 October 2011 Round 10 | Nacional | 3–0 | El Tanque Sisley | Montevideo, Uruguay |
| 20:15 UTC-02:00 | Medina 39'; Jadson Viera (yellow card) 54'; Torres (yellow card) 64'; Abero 71'; Viudez 82'; Cabrera (yellow card) 84' | Report | Aparicio (yellow card) 62' | Stadium: Estadio Gran Parque Central; Attendance: 22,000; Referee: Leodán González |

| 6 November 2011 Round 11 | Nacional | 0–0 | Fénix | Montevideo, Uruguay |
| 17:00 UTC-02:00 | Peralta (yellow card) 15'; F. Píriz (yellow card) 44'; Medina (yellow card) 57' | Report | Trujillo (yellow card) 2'; Pilipauskas (yellow card) 41'; J. Píriz (yellow card) 52'; Rivero (yellow card) 67'; Ortíz (yellow card) 90'; Novick (yellow card) 90+2' | Stadium: Estadio Gran Parque Central; Attendance: 26,000; Referee: Gustavo Siegler |

| 12 November 2011 Round 12 | Rampla Juniors | 0–2 | Nacional | Montevideo, Uruguay |
| 19:30 UTC-02:00 | Staud (yellow card) 26'; Gallo (yellow card) 85' | Report | Abero 44'; Placente (yellow card) 56'; Bueno 70' | Stadium: Estadio Centenario; Attendance: 15,000; Referee: Fernando Cabrera |

| 20 November 2011 Round 13 | Nacional | 2–1 | Peñarol | Montevideo, Uruguay |
| 17:00 UTC-02:00 | Rolín (yellow card) 38'; Abero (yellow card) 44'; Bueno 63'; Jadson Viera (yellow card) 82' (yellow-red card) 88'; D. Torres (yellow card) 85'; Cabrera (yellow card) 86'; Recoba 90+2' (pen.) (yellow card) 90+3' | Report | López (yellow card) 44'; E. Torres (yellow card) 52'; Rosano 60'; Valdez (yellow card) 84' | Stadium: Estadio Centenario; Attendance: 60,000; Referee: Darío Ubriaco |

| 27 November 2011 Round 14 | Montevideo Wanderers | 3–1 | Nacional | Montevideo, Uruguay |
| 17:00 UTC-02:00 | Pacheco 56' (yellow card) 57' | Report | Medina 42', 67' (yellow card) 86'; Bueno 72'; Núñez (yellow card) 79' | Stadium: Estadio Centenario; Attendance: 29,000; Referee: Martín Vázquez |

| 4 December 2011 Round 15 | Liverpool | 0–1 | Nacional | Montevideo, Uruguay |
| 17:00 UTC-02:00 | Mansilla (yellow card) 25'; Alvez (yellow card) 51' | Report | Rolín (yellow card) 18'; Torres (yellow card) 52'; Píriz (yellow card) 55'; Medina (yellow card) 70'; Recoba 78' | Stadium: Estadio Centenario; Attendance: 45,000; Referee: Roberto Silvera |

==== Torneo Clausura ====
| Pos | Team | Pld | W | D | L | GF | GA | GD | Pts | Qualification |
|---|---|---|---|---|---|---|---|---|---|---|
| 1 | Defensor Sporting (C) | 15 | 12 | 2 | 1 | 31 | 11 | +20 | 38 | Championship Playoffs |
| 2 | Nacional | 15 | 11 | 2 | 2 | 38 | 20 | +18 | 35 | |
| 3 | Liverpool | 15 | 11 | 1 | 3 | 31 | 21 | +10 | 34 | |
| 4 | Peñarol | 15 | 10 | 2 | 3 | 41 | 18 | +23 | 32 | |
| 5 | Cerro Largo | 15 | 8 | 3 | 4 | 28 | 18 | +10 | 27 | |

Rules for classification: 1st points; 2nd goal difference; 3rd goals scored; 4th head-to-head results; 5th draw.
(C) Champions

===== Matches =====
| 19 February 2012 Round 1 | Nacional | 3–2 | River Plate | Montevideo, Uruguay |
| 19:00 UTC-02:00 | Medina 8'; Núñez (yellow card) 25'; Viudez 33'; Sánchez (yellow card) 42'; Torres (yellow card) 52'; Cabrera 90' (pen.) | Report | González (yellow card) 18'; Pereira (yellow card) 31'; Olivera 37'; Prieto (yellow card) 48' (yellow-red card) 51'; Varela (yellow card) 68'; Janderson (yellow card) 89'; Franco 90+3' | Stadium: Estadio Gran Parque Central; Attendance: 25,000; Referee: Christian Ferreyra |

| 19 February 2012 Round 2 | Defensor Sporting | 2–2 | Nacional | Montevideo, Uruguay |
| 19:00 UTC-03:00 | Alemán 18' (pen.); Arias (yellow card) 36'; Rolán 85'; P. Pintos (yellow card) 86' | Report | Scotti (yellow card) 17'; Medina (yellow card) 18'; Cabrera (yellow card) 43'; Damonte (yellow card) 45'; Boghossian 62'; Rolín 90+2' | Stadium: Estadio Centenario; Attendance: 40,000; Referee: Héctor Martínez |

| 4 March 2012 Round 3 | Nacional | 3–0 | Cerro | Montevideo, Uruguay |
| 19:00 UTC-03:00 | Cabrera 2'; Placente (yellow card) 35'; Píriz (yellow card) 53'; Vecino 65'; Medina 73' | Report | S. Pérez (yellow card) 20' | Stadium: Estadio Gran Parque Central; Attendance: 25,000; Referee: Darío Ubriaco |

| 9 March 2012 Round 4 | Racing | 1–0 | Nacional | Montevideo, Uruguay |
| 20:15 UTC-03:00 | Contreras (yellow card) 11'; Fernández (yellow card) 26'; Quagliotti (yellow card) 43'; Hernández 70' (pen.); Ortíz (yellow card) 80' | Report | Jadson Viera (yellow card) 28'; Píriz (yellow card) 15' (yellow-red card) 46' | Stadium: Estadio Centenario; Attendance: 35,000; Referee: Líber Prudente |

| 23 March 2012 Round 5 | Nacional | 3–1 | Danubio | Montevideo, Uruguay |
| 16:30 UTC-03:00 | Porta 51' (pen.); Rolín (yellow card) 59'; Vecino 60'; Viudez 67' | Report | Martiñones 25' (yellow card) 32'; Perrone (yellow card) 83'; Tais (yellow card) 90+1' | Stadium: Estadio Gran Parque Central; Attendance: 25,000; Referee: Fernando Cabrera |

| 31 March 2012 Round 6 | Cerro Largo | 4-2 | Nacional | Melo, Uruguay |
| 20:00 UTC-03:00 | Sosa 5'; Vázquez 11'; Lucas 13' (yellow card) 44'; Lima (yellow card) 58'; Echandía (yellow card) 69'; Guevara 80' | Report | Vecino (yellow card) 9' (goal) 26'; Rolín (yellow card) 23'; Bueno 79'; Boghossian (yellow card) 82' | Stadium: Estadio Arquitecto Antonio Eleuterio Ubilla; Attendance: 9,000; Referee: Martín Vázquez |

| 9 April 2012 Round 7 | Nacional | 3-1 | Bella Vista | Montevideo, Uruguay |
| 21:00 UTC-03:00 | Porta 30' 42' (yellow card) 49' (goal) 62' (pen.); Alexis Rolin (yellow card) 37'; Mathias Abero (yellow card) 43'; Calzada (yellow card) 57' (yellow-red card) 64'; Damonte (yellow card) 78' | Summary | Ignacio Nicolini (yellow card) 35'; Jesús Sebastián Belase (yellow card) 48'; Esteban Maga (yellow card) 50' (goal) 57'; Pérez (yellow card) 61' | Stadium: Estadio Gran Parque Central; Referee: Roberto Silvera |

| 15 April 2012 Round 8 | Nacional | 6-1 | Cerrito | Montevideo, Uruguay |
| 17:00 UTC-03:00 | Recoba 25'; Píriz (yellow card) 27'; Porta 35' 45' 47'; Alexis Rolin 52'; Viudez (yellow card) 63'; Renato César 74' | Summary | Acuña 6' de los Santos (yellow card) 16'; Francisco Molina (yellow card) 56' | Stadium: Estadio Gran Parque Central; Referee: Daniel Fedorczuk |

| 21 April 2012 Round 9 | Rentistas | 2-3 | Nacional | Montevideo, Uruguay |
| 17:00 UTC-03:00 | Tantorno (yellow card) 38'; Cóccaro 45'; Santiago López 58' | Summary | Porta 10' 22'; Alexis Rolin (yellow card) 27'; Damonte (yellow card) 47'; Píriz (yellow card) 61'; Gonzalo Bueno 75'; Burián (yellow card) 84'; Scotti (yellow card) 90+2' | Stadium: Estadio Centenario; Referee: Yimmy Álvarez |

| 29 April 2012 Round 10 | El Tanque Sisley | 0 - 1 | Nacional | Montevideo, Uruguay |
| 17:00 UTC-03:00 | Ramírez (yellow card) 83'; Pizzichillo (yellow card) 90'; Ernesto Hernández 90+1' | Report | Federico Velázquez 88' (o.g.); Alexis Rolin (yellow card) 88' | Stadium: Estadio Centenario; Referee: Juan Cardellino |

| 5 May 2012 Round 11 | Fénix | 0 - 2 | Nacional | Montevideo, Uruguay |
| 17:00 UTC-03:00 | Ramis (yellow card) 29'; Guevgeozián (yellow card) 54'; Jonathan Píriz (yellow card) 63'; Trujillo (yellow card) 73'; Hernán Novick (yellow card) 90+2' | Report | Porta 49' (yellow card) 71'; Bueno (yellow card) 78'; Núñez 81'; Calzada (yellow card) 87' | Stadium: Estadio Centenario; Referee: Jonathan Fuentes |

| 12 May 2012 Round 12 | Nacional | 1 - 1 | Rampla Juniors | Montevideo, Uruguay |
| 17:00 UTC-03:00 | Núñez (yellow card) 37' (yellow-red card) 65'; Porta 55' (pen.); Darwin Torres (yellow card) 67'; Damonte (yellow card) 90+1'; Bava (yellow card) 90+2' | Report | Souza Motta (yellow card) 28'; Maximiliano Brito 58'; César Vargas (yellow card) 79' (yellow-red card) 81' | Stadium: Estadio Gran Parque Central; Referee: Fernando Falce |

| 20 May 2012 Round 13 | Peñarol | 2 - 3 | Nacional | Montevideo, Uruguay |
| 16:30 UTC-03:00 | Mora 1'; Valdez (yellow card) 13'; Emiliano Albín (yellow card) 14'; Zalayeta 24'; Marcel Novick (yellow card) 45'; Sebastián Cristóforo (yellow card) 81' | Report | Damonte (yellow card) 7'; Porta 15' (pen.) (yellow card) 90+1'; Calzada (yellow card) 27'; Píriz 40' (yellow card) 81'; Recoba 55'; Darwin Torres (yellow card) 60' (yellow-red card) 89' | Stadium: Estadio Centenario; Referee: Martín Vázquez |

| 27 May 2012 Round 14 | Nacional | 2 - 0 | Montevideo Wanderers | Montevideo, Uruguay |
| 16:00 UTC-03:00 | Alexis Rolin 50'; Viudez (yellow card) 59'; Placente (yellow card) 79'; Aguirre 83' | Report | Jonathan Sandoval (yellow card) 41'; Maximiliano Olivera (yellow card) 67' | Stadium: Estadio Gran Parque Central; Referee: Darío Ubríaco |

| 3 June 2012 Round 15 | Nacional | 4 - 3 | Liverpool | Montevideo, Uruguay |
| 16:00 UTC-03:00 | Porta 12', 56'; Calzada 16'; Piriz (yellow card) 51'; Cabrera 63'; Placente (yellow card) 67'; Alexis Rolin (yellow card) 74' | Report | Pereira (yellow card) 5' (goal) 84'; Agustin Morello (yellow card) 42'; Jonathan Barboza 60'; Carlos Núñez (yellow card) 76' (goal) 77'; Castillo (yellow card) 90+1' | Stadium: Estadio Gran Parque Central; Referee: Fernando Falce |

==== Aggregate table ====
| Pos | Team | Pld | W | D | L | GF | GA | GD | Pts | Qualification |
|---|---|---|---|---|---|---|---|---|---|---|
| 1 | Nacional | 30 | 20 | 7 | 3 | 68 | 31 | +37 | 67 | 2013 Copa Libertadores Second Stage and 2012 Copa Sudamericana First Stage (Note: Nacional qualified for the 2012 Copa Sudamericana as the Primera División champion.) (Note: As Nacional defeated Defensor Sporting in the initial playoff and became champion, the final was not played, and Peñarol became the runner-up as the 2nd best team in the aggregate table. Both Nacional and Peñarol qualified for the 2013 Copa Libertadores group stage. Defensor Sporting appealed against the decision of the AUF that Peñarol is Uruguay 2 in the 2013 Copa Libertadores, but was not accepted.) |
| 2 | Peñarol | 30 | 19 | 5 | 6 | 71 | 30 | +41 | 62 | 2013 Copa Libertadores Second Stage |
| 3 | Defensor Sporting | 30 | 19 | 5 | 6 | 54 | 27 | +27 | 62 | 2013 Copa Libertadores First Stage (Note: Defensor Sporting qualified for the 2013 Copa Libertadores first stage as the 3rd best team in the aggregate table.) |
| 4 | Cerro Largo | 30 | 16 | 6 | 8 | 46 | 34 | +12 | 54 | 2012 Copa Sudamericana First Stage |
| 5 | Liverpool | 30 | 17 | 2 | 11 | 48 | 39 | +9 | 53 | 2012 Copa Sudamericana First Stage |

Source: AUF
Rules for classification: 1) points; 2) goal difference; 3) number of goals scored.

===== Results summary =====
| Overall | | | | | | | | Home | | | | | | Away | | | | | |
| Pld | W | D | L | GF | GA | GD | Pts | W | D | L | GF | GA | GD | W | D | L | GF | GA | GD |
|---|---|---|---|---|---|---|---|---|---|---|---|---|---|---|---|---|---|---|---|
| 21 | 12 | 6 | 3 | 43 | 21 | +22 | 42 | 8 | 2 | 0 | 26 | 8 | +18 | 4 | 4 | 3 | 17 | 13 | +4 |

Last updated: 4 March.
Source: Competitive Matches

===== Results by round =====
| Round | 1 | 2 | 3 | 4 | 5 | 6 | 7 | 8 | 9 | 10 | 11 | 12 | 13 | 14 | 15 | 16 | 17 | 18 | 19 | 20 | 21 | 22 | 23 | 24 | 25 | 26 | 27 | 28 | 29 | 30 |
|---|---|---|---|---|---|---|---|---|---|---|---|---|---|---|---|---|---|---|---|---|---|---|---|---|---|---|---|---|---|---|
| Ground | A | H | A | H | A | H | A | A | H | H | H | A | H | A | A | H | A | H | A | H | A | H | H | A | A | A | H | A | H | H |
| Result | D | D | D | W | D | W | L | W | W | W | D | W | W | W | W | W | W | W | L | W | L | | | | | | | | | |
| Position | 6 | 9 | 10 | 7 | 7 | 5 | 8 | 6 | 4 | 4 | 4 | 2 | 2 | 1 | 1 | 1 | 2 | 2 | 2 | 2 | 2 | | | | | | | | | |

Updated to match(es) played on 1 April. Source:
A = Away; H = Home; W = Win; D = Draw; L = Loss

==== Relegation ====
| Pos | Team | Pld | W | D | L | GF | GA | GD | Pts |
|---|---|---|---|---|---|---|---|---|---|
| 1 | Nacional | 60 | 39 | 13 | 8 | 128 | 61 | +67 | 130 |
| 2 | Defensor Sporting | 60 | 36 | 12 | 12 | 104 | 52 | +52 | 120 |
| 3 | Peñarol | 60 | 34 | 12 | 14 | 123 | 67 | +56 | 114 |
| 4 | Cerro Largo | 30 | 16 | 6 | 8 | 46 | 34 | +12 | 108 (Note: Having only played one season in the Primera División, Cerrito's, Cerro Largo's, and Rentistas' points are doubled for the relegation table.) |
| 5 | Liverpool | 60 | 27 | 12 | 21 | 88 | 78 | +10 | 93 |

Source: AUF
Rules for classification: 1) points; 2) goal difference; 3) number of goals scored.

=== Copa Sudamericana ===
| 13 September 2011 Second Stage; First Leg | Universidad de Chile | 1–0 | (Uruguay) Nacional | Santiago, Chile |
| 21:15 UTC-03:00 | Vargas 59'; M. González (yellow card) 60'; Rebolledo (yellow card) 86' (yellow-red card) 89' | Report | Rolín (yellow card) 24'; Boghossian (yellow card) 45+1'; Cabrera (yellow card) 48'; Placente (yellow card) 50'; Godoy (yellow card) 53' | Stadium: Estadio Nacional Julio Martínez Prádanos; Attendance: 40,000; Referee: Paulo Oliveira (Brazil) |

| 21 September 2011 Second Stage; Second Leg | Nacional (Uruguay) | 0–2 (suspended) (0–3 agg.) | Universidad de Chile | Montevideo, Uruguay |
| 19:15 UTC-03:00 | Píriz (yellow card) 22'; Porta (yellow card) 45+2' | Report | Vargas 11' (yellow card) 18'; M. Rodríguez 12' (yellow card) 45' | Stadium: Estadio Gran Parque Central; Attendance: 27,000; Referee: Antonio Arias (Paraguay) |

=== Torneo Preparación ===
| 29 January 2012 Round of 16 | Nacional | 2–3 | Bella Vista | Fray Bentos, Uruguay |
| 20:10 UTC-02:00 | Tejera (yellow card) 2'; López 11'; Cavallini (yellow card) 71'; Pereyra 74'; Moreira (yellow card) 87' | Report | Rodríguez 3'; Collazo (yellow card) 54'; Díaz 63'; J. Pérez (yellow card) 65'; Bosco Frontán 75' | Stadium: Estadio Municipal Parque Liebig's; Attendance: 4,000; Referee: Jesús Castro |

=== Torneo de Honor ===
| 1 February 2012 Quarterfinals | Nacional | 1–1 (3–4 p) | Liverpool | Tacuarembó, Uruguay |
| 22:10 UTC-02:00 | Dorrego 73'; Cavallini (yellow card) 81' | Report | Pozzi (yellow card) 34'; Figueredo (yellow card) 41'; Núñez 79'; Aguirre (yellow card) 85' | Stadium: Estadio Ingeniero Raúl Goyenola; Attendance: 10,000; Referee: Freddy De Seja |
| | Penalties |
| | Dorrego (penalty scored); Pereiro (penalty scored); Bone (penalty missed); Moreira (penalty scored); Barcia (penalty missed) | | Ramírez (penalty scored); Mansilla (penalty scored); Herrera (penalty missed); Tamareo (penalty scored); Aguirre (penalty scored) |

=== Copa Libertadores ===
| Pos | Team | Pld | W | D | L | GF | GA | GD | Pts |
|---|---|---|---|---|---|---|---|---|---|
| 1 | (Paraguay) Libertad | 6 | 4 | 1 | 1 | 11 | 7 | +4 | 13 |
| 2 | (Brazil) Vasco da Gama | 6 | 4 | 1 | 1 | 10 | 6 | +4 | 13 |
| 3 | (Uruguay) Nacional | 6 | 2 | 0 | 4 | 5 | 7 | −2 | 6 |
| 4 | (Peru) Alianza Lima | 6 | 1 | 0 | 5 | 6 | 12 | −6 | 3 |

| 8 February 2012 Group Stage | Vasco da Gama (Brazil) | 1–2 | (Uruguay) Nacional | Rio de Janeiro, Brazil |
| 22:00 UTC-02:00 | Rodolfo (yellow card) 35'; Felipe Bastos (yellow card) 65'; Alecsandro 73'; Juninho (yellow card) 75'; Renato Silva (red card) 90' | Report | Placente (yellow card) 24'; Damonte (yellow card) 26'; Dedé 30' (o.g.); Sánchez 46'; Cabrera (yellow card) 87'; Viudez (yellow card) 90+2' | Stadium: Estádio São Januário; Attendance: 25,000; Referee: Hernando Buitrago (Colombia) |

| 16 February 2012 Group Stage | Nacional (Uruguay) | 1–2 | (Paraguay) Libertad | Montevideo, Uruguay |
| 20:15 UTC-02:00 | Damonte (yellow card) 10'; Aguirre 20'; Placente (yellow card) 55'; Sánchez (yellow card) 83' | Report | Cáceres (yellow card) 32'; Samudio 58'; Caballero 64' (yellow card) 84' | Stadium: Estadio Gran Parque Central; Attendance: 27,000; Referee: Saúl Laverni (Argentina) |

| 20 March 2012 Group Stage | Alianza Lima (Peru) | 1–0 | (Uruguay) Nacional | Lima, Peru |
| 20:30 UTC-05:00 | Fernández 15'; Quinteros (yellow card) 42'; Corrales (yellow card) 48'; Montaño (yellow card) 52'; Ramos (yellow card) 56'; Rabanal (yellow card) 90+1' | Report | Damonte (yellow card) 49' (yellow-red card) 59'; Placente (red card) 69'; Calzada (yellow card) 71' | Stadium: Estadio Alejandro Villanueva; Attendance: 30,000; Referee: Wilmar Roldán (Colombia) |

| 27 March 2012 Group Stage | Nacional (Uruguay) | 1–0 | (Peru) Alianza Lima | Montevideo, Uruguay |
| 20:15 UTC-03:00 | Viudez (yellow card) 10' (goal) 68'; Scotti (yellow card) 25'; Torres (yellow card) 63'; Romero (yellow card) 82' | Report | Ascues (yellow card) 20'; Corrales (yellow card) 29'; Quinteros (yellow card) 44'; González (yellow card) 61'; Bazán (yellow card) 78' | Stadium: Estadio Centenario; Attendance: 40,000; Referee: Néstor Pitana (Argentina) |

| 5 April 2012 Group Stage | Libertad (Paraguay) | 2-1 | (Uruguay) Nacional | Asunción, Paraguay |
| 19:15 UTC-04:00 | Nasuti (yellow card) 29'; Cáceres (yellow card) 32' (goal) 90'; Velázquez 66' | Summary | Viudez 10'; Alexis Rolin (yellow card) 49'; Píriz (yellow card) 73'; Damonte (yellow card) 90+2' | Stadium: Estadio Dr. Nicolás Leoz; Referee: (Ecuador) Oscar Ponze Manzo |

| 12 April 2012 Group Stage | Nacional (Uruguay) | 0-1 | (Brazil) Vasco da Gama | Montevideo, Uruguay |
| 21:50 UTC-03:00 | Álvarez (yellow card) 26'; Mathías Abero (yellow card) 70'; Damonte (yellow card) 76' | Summary | Diego Souza 57'; Alecsandro (yellow card) 78' | Stadium: Estadio Centenario; Referee: (Argentina) Pablo Lunati |

== See also ==
- 2011–12 in Uruguayan football
