= 2012 Copa Bimbo =

Tournament details
- Host country: Uruguay
- Dates: 13 January – 15 January
- Teams: 4 (from 1 confederation)
- Venue: 1 (in 1 host city)

Final positions
- Champions: (Uruguay) Peñarol (1st title)
- Runners-up: (Chile) Palestino
- Third place: (Uruguay) Nacional
- Fourth place: (Peru) Universidad San Martín

Tournament statistics
- Matches played: 4
- Goals scored: 13 (3.25 per match)
- Top scorer(s): (Uruguay) Emiliano Albín (Uruguay) Santiago Silva (Chile) David Llanos (2 goals each)
- Best player: (Uruguay) Alejandro González

The 2012 Campeonato Internacional de Verano, also known as 2012 Copa Bimbo for sponsoring purposes, is the fourth edition of the Campeonato Internacional de Verano, an exhibition international club football competition that featured two clubs from Uruguay (Nacional and Peñarol), one from Peru (Universidad San Martín) and one from Chile (Palestino). It is played in Montevideo, Uruguay at the Estadio Centenario from 13 to 15 January 2012.

== Bracket ==
Semi-finals
(Peru) U. San Martín	1 (5)
(Chile) Palestino (pen.)	1 (6)
(Uruguay) Nacional	1 (6)
(Uruguay) Peñarol (pen.)	1 (7)

Final
(Chile) Palestino	2
(Uruguay) Peñarol	4
Third place
(Peru) U. San Martín	1
(Uruguay) Nacional	2

== Matches ==
=== Semi-finals ===
13 January 2012
20:00 (UTC-2)

Universidad San Martín (Peru)	1–1	(Chile) Palestino
Arriola 55'	Report	Llanos 32'
Penalties
Perea (penalty missed); Fernández (penalty scored); Cueva (penalty scored); Ballón (penalty scored); Sánchez (penalty missed); Álvarez (penalty missed); Cardoza (penalty scored); Céspedes (penalty missed)	4–5	Filgueira (penalty missed); Riquelme (penalty missed); R. Flores (penalty scored); Llanos (penalty scored); Bishara (penalty scored); D. Flores (penalty missed); Escalona (penalty scored); Pérez (penalty scored)

Estadio Centenario, Montevideo
Attendance: 40,000
Referee: Líber Prudente (Uruguay)

13 January 2012
22:30 UTC-02:00

Nacional (Uruguay)	1—1	(Uruguay) Peñarol
Boghossián 37' (pen.)	Report	Cristóforo 25'
Penalties
Viudez (penalty scored); Rolín (penalty scored); Romero (penalty scored); Núñez (penalty missed); García (penalty scored); Bueno (penalty scored); R. López (penalty missed)	5—6	Amodio (penalty missed); Albín (penalty scored); Pérez (penalty scored); López (penalty scored); Cristóforo (penalty scored); González (penalty scored); Carini (penalty scored)

Estadio Centenario, Montevideo, Uruguay
Attendance: 40,000
Referee: Héctor Martínez (Uruguay)

=== Third place ===
15 January 2012
20:00 UTC-02:00

Universidad San Martín (Peru)	1—2	(Uruguay) Nacional
Perea 9'	Report	Recoba 15'; Vecino 37'

Estadio Centenario, Montevideo, Uruguay
Attendance: 5,000
Referee: Gustavo Siegler (Uruguay)

=== Final ===
15 January 2012
22:00 (UTC-2)

Palestino (Chile)	2—4	(Uruguay) Peñarol
Canales 62'; Llanos 87'	Report	Albín 28', 38' (pen.); S. Silva 49', 63'

Estadio Centenario, Montevideo
Attendance: 12,000
Referee: Líber Prudente (Uruguay)

Palestino	Peñarol

PALESTINO:
GK	30	(Chile) Felipe Núñez (c)
RB	13	(Chile) Miguel Escalona
CB	6	(Uruguay) Darío Flores
CB	14	(Palestine) Roberto Bishara
LB	2	(Chile) Mirko Opazo		(substituted off) 71'
DM	16	(Chile) Roberto Ávalos	(yellow card) 40'	(substituted off) 75'
RM	26	(Chile) Diego Torres		(substituted off) 46'
LM	19	(Uruguay) Gastón Filgueira		(substituted off) 61'
AM	10	(Uruguay) Robert Flores
CF	11	(Chile) David Llanos
CF	9	(Uruguay) Diego Cháves		(substituted off) 46'
Substitutes:
GK	12	(Chile) José Quezada
DF	5	(Paraguay) Rodrigo Riquelme
DF	29	(Chile) Mario Carmona		(substituted on) 71'
MF	8	(Chile) Jason Silva		(substituted on) 61'
MF	20	(Chile) César Henríquez		(substituted on) 46'
MF	24	(Chile) Sebastián Alarcón		(substituted on) 75'
FW	27	(Chile) Nicolás Canales	(yellow card) 62'	(substituted on) 46'
Manager:
(Uruguay) Daniel Carreño

PEÑAROL:
GK	1	(Argentina) Danilo Lerda
RB	24	(Uruguay) Emiliano Albín
CB	2	(Uruguay) Juan Alvez		(substituted off) 58'
CB	4	(Uruguay) Alejandro González (c)
LB	7	(Uruguay) Walter López
DM	19	(Uruguay) Nicolás Amodio		(substituted off) 79'
RM	21	(Uruguay) Bruno Montelongo
LM	25	(Uruguay) Sebastián Cristóforo		(substituted off) 46'
RW	13	(Uruguay) Santiago Silva		(substituted off) 71'
LW	20	(Uruguay) Jorge Zambrana		(substituted off) 71'
CF	17	(Uruguay) Marcelo Zalayeta		(substituted off) 46'
Substitutes:
GK	12	(Uruguay) Fabián Carini
DF	3	(Uruguay) Gerardo Alcoba
MF	6	(Uruguay) Facundo Guichón		(substituted on) 46'
FW	14	(Uruguay) Luis Aguiar	(yellow card) 50'	(substituted on) 46'
MF	15	(Uruguay) Elbio Álvarez	(yellow card) 40'	(substituted on) 71'
MF	18	(Uruguay) Sebastián Rosano		(substituted on) 79'
FW	16	(Uruguay) Jonathan Siles		(substituted on) 71'
Manager:
(Uruguay) Gregorio Pérez

Man of the match:
(Uruguay) Emiliano Albín
Assistant referees:
(Uruguay) Carlos Pastorino
(Uruguay) Raúl Hartwig
Fourth official:
(Uruguay) Gustavo Siegler

Copa Bimbo
2012 Winners

Peñarol
1st title

== Scorers ==
2 goals

- (Uruguay) Emiliano Albín (Peñarol)
- (Uruguay) Santiago Silva (Peñarol)
- (Chile) David Llanos (Palestino)

1 goal

- (Argentina) Héber Arriola (Universidad San Martín)
- (Argentina) Sebastián Cristóforo (Peñarol)
- (Uruguay) Joaquín Boghossián (Nacional)
- (Colombia) Luis Perea (Universidad San Martín)
- (Uruguay) Álvaro Recoba (Nacional)
- (Uruguay) Matías Vecino (Nacional)
- (Chile) Nicolás Canales (Palestino)
