= Campeonato Internacional de Verano =

Football competition held in Uruguay

- Founded: 2009
- Region: South America (CONMEBOL)
- Teams: 4
- Current champions: (Uruguay) Peñarol
- Most championships: (Uruguay) Nacional (2 titles)
- Website: Copa Bimbo
- 2012 Copa Bimbo

The Campeonato Internacional de Verano, also known under its sponsored name Copa Bimbo, is an international exhibition football competition hosted in Montevideo, Uruguay, since 2009. It features four teams: Uruguay's two major teams Nacional and Peñarol, and guest teams from Argentina (in 2011), Brazil (in 2009) and Paraguay (in 2010 and 2011). All matches are played at the Estadio Centenario in Montevideo, the home stadium of the Uruguay national team and the host of the 1930 FIFA World Cup Final. The tournament is produced and televised by Uruguayan telecommunications company Tenfield, and is sponsored by the Mexican bakery and food corporation Grupo Bimbo.

The 2009 tournament was won by Brazilian club Cruzeiro, and the 2010 and 2011 edition was won by Uruguayan club Nacional.

== Results ==
Year	Final			Third Place			Venue
Year	Winner	Score	Runner-up	Third place	Score	Fourth place	Venue
2009	Cruzeiro (Brazil)	4 – 1	(Uruguay) Nacional	Atlético Mineiro (Brazil)	4 – 1	(Uruguay) Peñarol	Estadio Centenario, Montevideo
2010	Nacional (Uruguay)	1 – 1 (3 – 1 pens.)	(Uruguay) Danubio	Nacional (Paraguay)	2 – 2 (3 – 1 pens.)	(Uruguay) Peñarol	Estadio Centenario, Montevideo
2011	Nacional (Uruguay)	2 – 2 (5 – 3 pens.)	(Paraguay) Libertad	Peñarol (Uruguay)	2 – 2 (4 – 2 pens.)	(Argentina) Vélez Sársfield	Estadio Centenario, Montevideo
2012	Peñarol (Uruguay)	4 – 2	(Chile) Palestino	Nacional (Uruguay)	2 – 1	(Peru) Universidad San Martín	Estadio Centenario, Montevideo

== Honours ==
Year	Top Goalscorer	Winning Manager	Best Player
2009	(Brazil) Diego Tardelli (Atlético Mineiro) (3 goals)	(Brazil) Adílson Dias Batista (Cruzeiro)	(Brazil) Ramires (Cruzeiro)
2010	(Uruguay) Diego Ifrán (Danubio) (Uruguay) Diego Perrone (Danubio) (Paraguay) Ricardo Mazacote (Nacional (PAR)) (2 goals each)	(Uruguay) Eduardo Acevedo (Nacional)	(Argentina) Ángel Morales (Nacional)
2011	(Australia) Richard Porta (Nacional) (2 goals)	(Uruguay) Juan Ramón Carrasco (Nacional)	(Uruguay) Sebastián Coates (Nacional)
2012	(Uruguay) Emiliano Albín (Peñarol) (Uruguay) Santiago Silva (Peñarol) (Chile) David Llanos (Palestino) (2 goals each)	(Uruguay) Gregorio Pérez (Peñarol)	(Uruguay) Alejandro González (Peñarol)

== Performances by team ==
Team	Winners	Runners-up	Third	Fourth
(Uruguay) Nacional	2 (2010, 2011)	1 (2009)	1 (2012)	
(Uruguay) Peñarol	1 (2012)		1 (2011)	2 (2009, 2010)
(Brazil) Cruzeiro	1 (2009)			
(Chile) Palestino		1 (2012)		
(Paraguay) Libertad		1 (2011)		
(Uruguay) Danubio		1 (2010)		
(Brazil) Atlético Mineiro			1 (2009)	
(Paraguay) Nacional			1 (2010)	
(Peru) Universidad San Martín				1 (2012)
(Argentina) Vélez Sársfield				1 (2011)

== Performances by country ==
Nation	Winners	Runners-up	Third	Fourth
Uruguay	3 (2010, 2011, 2012)	2 (2009, 2010)	2 (2011, 2012)	2 (2009, 2010)
Brazil	1 (2009)		1 (2009)	
Paraguay		1 (2011)	1 (2010)	
Chile		1 (2012)		
Peru				1 (2012)
Argentina				1 (2011)
