= 2016 Sporting Cristal season =

Football league season

Sporting Cristal
2016 season
- President: Federico Cúneo
- Coach: Mariano Soso
- Stadium: Alberto Gallardo, Lima
- Torneo Descentralizado: Torneo Apertura: Second (2°); Torneo Clausura: Champion; Liguilla A: Champion; Aggregate Table: First (1°); Final National: Champions; Champions National (1°)
- Copa Libertadores: Second stage
- Top goalscorer: League: All: Santiago Silva (14)
Home colours	Away colours	Third colours

The 2016 Sporting Cristal season were the Sixty-First (61.º) of the club from its foundation in 1955, Sixty-One (61) participations consecutives in the top-flight of Peruvian Primera División (of 100 Editions) with denomination Torneo Descentralizado. In Previous Season the club qualified as Runner-up National 2nd Place of the 2015 Torneo Descentralizado.

Sporting Cristal were a of sixteen (16) clubs in the Fifty-First edition (51.º) Torneo Descentralizado, the competition most important of the Peruvian football. The club played the Peruvian Primera División and Copa Libertadores for fourth consecutive year and for Thirty-Second (32nd) Time. Sporting Cristal won their 18th Torneo Descentralizado Title.

== Players ==
Note: Flags indicate national team as defined under FIFA eligibility rules; some limited exceptions apply. Players may hold more than one non-FIFA nationality.

No.	Pos.	Nation	Player
1	GK	PER	Diego Penny
2	DF	PER	Alberto Rodríguez
3	DF	PER	Brian Bernaola
5	MF	PER	Pedro Aquino
7	MF	ARG	Horacio Calcaterra
9	FW	URU	Santiago Silva
10	MF	PER	Renzo Sheput
11	FW	PER	Irven Ávila
12	GK	PER	Carlos Grados
13	DF	PER	Renzo Revoredo
15	DF	PER	Alexis Cossio

No.	Pos.	Nation	Player
17	MF	PER	Ray Sandoval
19	MF	ARG	Alfredo Ramúa
21	MF	PER	Josepmir Ballón
22	DF	PER	Jair Céspedes
23	MF	URU	Jorge Cazulo
24	DF	PER	Josué Estrada
25	MF	URU	Gabriel Costa
27	MF	PER	Carlos Lobatón (Captain)
29	DF	PER	Luis Abram
30	FW	PER	Alexander Succar

== Competitions ==
=== Overall ===
Competition	Started round	Final position / round	First match	Last match
Torneo Descentralizado	Torneo Apertura	Champion	Feb 6	Dec 18
Copa Libertadores	Second stage	Second stage	Feb 18	Apr 19

=== Torneo Descentralizado ===
==== Torneo Apertura ====
Pos	Team	Pld	W	D	L	GF	GA	GD	Pts
1	Universitario	15	11	2	2	31	12	+19	35
2	Sporting Cristal	15	7	5	3	21	11	+10	26
3	Alianza Lima	15	8	2	5	24	18	+6	26

==== Results ====
Home \ Away	AAS	ALI	AYA	COM	MUN	JA	BOC	MEL	RGA	CRI	SHU	UCO	UCV	USM	UTC	UNI
Alianza Atlético																
Alianza Lima										2–4						
Ayacucho																
Comerciantes Unidos																
Deportivo Municipal																
Juan Aurich										0–3						
Defensor La Bocana										2–1						
Melgar										1–2						
Real Garcilaso										1–1						
Sporting Cristal	3–0		1–0	1–1	0–1						0–0	2–1		1–1		0–1
Sport Huancayo																
Unión Comercio																
Universidad César Vallejo										0–2						
Universidad San Martín																
UTC										0–0						
Universitario																

Updated to match(es) played on May 6, 2016. Source: ADFP - official fixture
Legend: Blue = home team win; Yellow = draw; Red = away team win.

==== Torneo Clausura ====
Pos	Team	Pld	W	D	L	GF	GA	GD	Pts	Qualification
1	Sporting Cristal	30	14	11	5	46	27	+19	53	Qualification to the 2017 Copa Sudamericana and advance to Liguilla A
2	Universitario	30	15	6	9	51	39	+12	51	
3	Melgar	30	13	7	10	48	38	+10	46	

==== Results ====
Home \ Away	AAS	ALI	AYA	COM	MUN	JA	BOC	MEL	RGA	CRI	SHU	UCO	UCV	USM	UTC	UNI
Alianza Atlético										0–2						
Alianza Lima																
Ayacucho										1–1						
Comerciantes Unidos																
Deportivo Municipal										0–0						
Juan Aurich																
Defensor La Bocana																
Melgar																
Real Garcilaso																
Sporting Cristal		0–2				1–1	1–1	2–1	3–1				1–1		4–0	
Sport Huancayo										3–1						
Unión Comercio										1–2						
Universidad César Vallejo																
Universidad San Martín										1–2						
UTC																
Universitario										2–2						

Updated to match(es) played on 14 August 2016. Source: ADFP - official fixture
Legend: Blue = home team win; Yellow = draw; Red = away team win.

==== Liguillas ====
Liguilla A

Pos	Team	Pld	W	D	L	GF	GA	GD	Pts
1	Sporting Cristal	44	21	12	11	70	48	+22	77
2	Melgar	44	21	11	12	68	48	+20	74
3	Deportivo Municipal	44	19	12	13	54	52	+2	69

Results

Home \ Away	MUN	JA	BOC	MEL	RGA	CRI	UCO	UCV
Deportivo Municipal						1–3		
Juan Aurich						0–0		
Defensor La Bocana						1–2		
Melgar						2–0		
Real Garcilaso						1–0		
Sporting Cristal	0–2	3–0	2–5	3–2	2–1		1–0	7–2
Unión Comercio						2–0		
Universidad César Vallejo						2–1		

Updated to match(es) played on unknown. Source: ADFP - official fixture
Legend: Blue = home team win; Yellow = draw; Red = away team win.

==== Aggregate table ====
Pos	Team	Pld	W	D	L	GF	GA	GD	Pts	Qualification
1	Sporting Cristal	44	21	12	11	70	48	+22	77	Advance to Playoffs and qualification to the 2017 Copa Libertadores
2	Melgar	44	21	11	12	68	48	+20	74	
3	Universitario	44	20	11	13	73	61	+12	72	

==== Playoffs ====
===== Semi-finals =====
November 30, 2016 First Leg	Deportivo Municipal	1–0	Sporting Cristal	Iván Elías Moreno, Lima
15:30	Masakatsu Sawa 90+1'			Attendance: 5,806; Referee: Víctor Hugo Carrillo

December 4, 2016 Second Leg	Sporting Cristal	1–0 (3–2 p)	Deportivo Municipal	Nacional, Lima
16:00	Carlos Lobaton 3'			Attendance: 19,604; Referee: Miguel Santivañez
	Penalties
	Cazulo (penalty missed); Silva (penalty missed); Ramúa (penalty scored); Calcaterra (penalty scored); Rojas (penalty scored)		(penalty scored) Símon; (penalty missed) García; (penalty scored) Vasquez; (penalty missed) Gonzales Vigil; (penalty missed) Zela

===== Finals =====
December 11, 2016 First Leg	Melgar	1–1	Sporting Cristal	Virgen de Chapi, Arequipa
	Bernardo Cuesta 57'		64' Diego Ifrán	Attendance: 30,176; Referee: Víctor Hugo Carrillo

December 18, 2016 Second Leg	Sporting Cristal	0–0	Melgar	Nacional, Lima
15:30				Attendance: 32,002; Referee: Henry Gambetta

=== Copa Libertadores ===
Pos	Team	Pld	W	D	L	GF	GA	GD	Pts
1	Atlético Nacional	6	5	1	0	12	0	+12	16
2	Huracán	6	2	2	2	7	7	0	8
3	Peñarol	6	1	2	3	5	11	−6	5
4	Sporting Cristal	6	1	1	4	9	15	−6	4

18 February 2016	Sporting Cristal (Peru)	1–1	(Uruguay) Peñarol	Estadio Nacional, Lima
19:45 UTC−5	Rodríguez 74'	Report	Aguiar 39'	Attendance: 27,500; Referee: Wilton Sampaio (Brazil)

1 March 2016	Atlético Nacional (Colombia)	3–0	(Peru) Sporting Cristal	Estadio Atanasio Girardot, Medellín
19:45 UTC−5	Sánchez 11'; Copete 32'; Moreno 73'	Report		Attendance: 44,109; Referee: Oscar Maldonado (Bolivia)

8 March 2016	Sporting Cristal (Peru)	3–2	(Argentina) Huracán	Estadio Nacional, Lima
19:45 UTC−5	Costa 25'; S. Silva 35', 55' (pen.)	Report	Ábila 56', 78'	Attendance: 12,000; Referee: Mario Díaz de Vivar (Paraguay)

5 April 2016	Huracán (Argentina)	4–2	(Peru) Sporting Cristal	Estadio Tomás Adolfo Ducó, Buenos Aires
19:30 UTC−3	Ábila 23', 30'; Romero Gamarra 67'; Miralles 83'	Report	S. Silva 17'; Calcaterra 42'	Attendance: 27,000; Referee: Raphael Claus (Brazil)

12 April 2016	Sporting Cristal (Peru)	0–1	(Colombia) Atlético Nacional	Estadio Nacional, Lima
19:45 UTC−5		Report	Ibarbo 11' (pen.)	Attendance: 7,000; Referee: Juan Soto (Venezuela)

19 April 2016	Peñarol (Uruguay)	4–3	(Peru) Sporting Cristal	Estadio Campeón del Siglo, Montevideo
19:30 UTC−3	Aguiar 29'; Novick 72', 80'; Albarracín 85'	Report	Rodríguez 18', 23'; I. Ávila 36'	Attendance: 5,000; Referee: Luiz Flávio de Oliveira (Brazil)

== See also ==
- Club Sporting Cristal
- 2016 Torneo Descentralizado
