= 2009 Campeonato Internacional de Verano =

Tournament details
- Host country: Uruguay
- Dates: 17 January – 21 January
- Teams: 4 (from 1 confederation)
- Venue: 1 (in 1 host city)

Final positions
- Champions: (Brazil) Cruzeiro (1st title)
- Runners-up: (Uruguay) Nacional
- Third place: (Brazil) Atlético Mineiro
- Fourth place: (Uruguay) Peñarol

Tournament statistics
- Matches played: 4
- Goals scored: 19 (4.75 per match)
- Top scorer(s): (Brazil) Diego Tardelli (3 goals)
- Best player: (Brazil) Ramires

The Campeonato Internacional de Verano 2009, also known by the sponsored name Copa Bimbo, was the inaugural Campeonato Internacional de Verano, an exhibition international club football competition featuring four clubs from Uruguay and Brazil. It was played in Montevideo, Uruguay at the Estadio Centenario from 17 to 21 January 2009. It was won by Brazilian club Cruzeiro, who defeated Uruguayan side Nacional in the final.

== Bracket ==
Semi-finals
(Uruguay) Nacional	2
(Uruguay) Peñarol	1
(Brazil) Atlético Mineiro	2
(Brazil) Cruzeiro	4

Final
(Uruguay) Nacional	1
(Brazil) Cruzeiro	4
Third place
(Uruguay) Peñarol	1
(Brazil) Atlético Mineiro	4

== Matches ==
=== Semi-finals ===
2009-01-17
16:20 (UTC-3)

Atlético Mineiro (Brazil)	2 – 4	(Brazil) Cruzeiro
Tardelli 36', 67'	(Report) (in Portuguese)	Renan 17' (o.g.); Fernandinho 39' (pen.); Ramires 45+1'; Soares 89'

Estadio Centenario, Montevideo
Attendance: 25,000
Referee: Jorge Larrionda (Uruguay)

2009-01-17
19:20 (UTC-3)

Nacional (Uruguay)	2 – 1	(Uruguay) Peñarol
Blanco 45+1' (pen.); Romero 69'	(Report) (in Portuguese)	Bueno 15'

Estadio Centenario, Montevideo
Attendance: 27,000
Referee: Darío Ubríaco (Uruguay)

=== Third place ===
2009-01-21
20:45 (UTC-3)

Peñarol (Uruguay)	1 – 4	(Brazil) Atlético Mineiro
Franco 57'	(Report) (in Portuguese)	Éder Luis 9'; Tardelli 53'; Araújo 56'; Carlos Alberto 79'

Estadio Centenario, Montevideo
Referee: Martín Vázquez (Uruguay)

=== Final ===
2009-01-21
22:45 (UTC-3)

Nacional (Uruguay)	1 – 4	(Brazil) Cruzeiro
Medina 28'	(Report) (in Portuguese)	Elicarlos 7'; Ramires 26'; Thiago Ribeiro 35'; Wellington Paulista 37'

Estadio Centenario, Montevideo
Referee: Roberto Silvera (Uruguay)

Nacional	Cruzeiro

== Scorers ==
3 goals

- (Brazil) Diego Tardelli (Atlético Mineiro)

2 goals

- (Brazil) Ramires (Cruzeiro)

1 goal

- (Brazil) Carlos Alberto (Atlético Mineiro)
- (Brazil) Éder Luis (Atlético Mineiro)
- (Brazil) Araújo (Atlético Mineiro)
- (Brazil) Elicarlos (Cruzeiro)
- (Brazil) Fernandinho (Cruzeiro)
- (Brazil) Soares (Cruzeiro)

1 goal (cont.)

- (Brazil) Thiago Ribeiro (Cruzeiro)
- (Brazil) Wellington Paulista (Cruzeiro)
- (Uruguay) Adrián Romero (Nacional)
- (Uruguay) Alexander Medina (Nacional)
- (Uruguay) Sergio Blanco (Nacional)
- (Uruguay) Carlos Bueno (Peñarol)
- (Uruguay) José María Franco (Peñarol)

Own goal

- (Brazil) Renan (Atlético Mineiro) for (Cruzeiro)

Copa Bimbo
2009 Winners

Cruzeiro
1st title
