= Sebastián Sosa (footballer, born 1994) =

Uruguayan footballer

Personal information
- Full name: Sebastián Sosa Sánchez
- Date of birth: 13 March 1994 (age 32)
- Place of birth: Melo, Uruguay
- Height: 1.84 m (6 ft 1/2 in)
- Position: Forward

Youth career
- 2002–2010: Melo Wanderers
- 2010–2011: Cerro Largo
- 2012–2013: Palermo

Senior career*
Years	Team	Apps	(Gls)
2011–2012	Cerro Largo	22	(9)
2012–2014	Palermo	0	(0)
2013	→ Central Español (loan)	20	(5)
2014	→ Senica (loan)	9	(2)
2014–2016	Empoli	0	(0)
2014–2016	→ Vllaznia Shkodër (loan)	26	(10)
2016–2018	Nacional	1	(0)
2017	→ Boston River (loan)	12	(2)
2017–2018	→ Juventud Unida (loan)	22	(2)
2018	Quilmes	4	(0)
2019	Cerro Largo	11	(8)
2019–2020	Atlante	18	(5)
2020	Querétaro	10	(1)
2021	Patronato	31	(10)
2022	Boston River	0	(0)
2022	Vélez Sarsfield	11	(0)
2022	→ Everton (loan)	15	(5)
2023	Banfield	31	(2)
2024	Cerro Largo	32	(3)
2025	Racing Montevideo	16	(6)
2025	→ Everton (loan)	15	(6)
2026	Everton	0	(0)

International career
2012	Uruguay U20	5	(2)
- * Club domestic league appearances and goals as of 14 July 2026

Sebastián Sosa Sánchez (born 13 March 1994) is an Uruguayan football player who plays as a forward. He last played for Chilean club Everton.

== Club career ==
His nickname is Bambino or El Mosquito, inherited from his father Heberley, former striker of Penarol, Nacional, Cerro Porteño and Qingdao Aokema.

Sosa made his Uruguayan Primera División debut for Cerro Largo on 3 September 2011 in a match against Fénix in the 76th minute for teammate Matías Tellechea. He made his first goal against River Plate on 9 October 2011. On 29 August 2012 he moved to Serie A club Palermo, for 1.6 million €, signing a five-year contract.

In January 2013 he moved to Central Español on a year loan. Following that, he was loaned out to Slovak club FK Senica, where he failed to impress. On 1 September 2014, he was permanently sold to Empoli and then loaned out to Eastern Europe again, this time to Albanian Superliga club Vllaznia Shkodër.

Sosa made his first appearance with Vllaznia on 11 September 2014, starting and playing full-90 minutes in a 1–1 home draw against KF Tirana, in a match which would be remembered mostly for the incidents inside and outside the field. He opened his scoring account on 27 September where he scored the winning goal against KF Elbasani, helping Vllaznia to reach the third victory of the season.

After playing for Patronato, in January 2022 he joined Boston River and was immediately loaned to Vélez Sarsfield on a deal for a year with an option to buy. At the end of June 2022, Sosa left Veléz to join Everton de Viña del Mar in the Chilean Primera División on a new loan spell until the end of the year.

Sosa returned to Everton in July 2025 on loan from Racing Club de Montevideo. He left them on 14 July 2026.

== International career ==
Sosa has played for Uruguay U20, scoring twice in five appearances.
