= Andrés Aparicio =

Uruguayan footballer (born 1976)

Personal information
- Full name: Ricardo Andrés Aparicio
- Date of birth: August 10, 1976 (age 50)
- Place of birth: Montevideo, Uruguay
- Height: 1.69 m (5 ft 7 in)
- Position: Midfielder

Senior career*
Years	Team	Apps	(Gls)
2000	Basáñez		
2001	Bella Vista		
2002	Montevideo Wanderers	27	(1)
2003	Defensor Sporting	27	(1)
2004	→ Nacional (loan)	15	(0)
2004	Defensor Sporting	10	(0)
2005	Atlético Junior	4	(0)
2005	Municipal		
2006	Banfield	4	(0)
2006	Cerrito	8	(0)
2007	Rampla Juniors	11	(0)
2007	Liverpool U	8	(1)
2008	San Martín	11	(0)
2008–2009	Quilmes	27	(0)
2009	Cerro Largo	8	(0)
2010	Defensores de Belgrano	18	(0)
2010–2015	El Tanque Sisley	108	(1)
Medal record
First place	Uruguayan Primera División	2004
First place	Liga Nacional de Fútbol de Guatemala	2005
First place	Primera Nacional	2008
- * Club domestic league appearances and goals

Ricardo Andrés Aparicio (born August 10, 1976) is a Uruguayan footballer who played as a midfielder for clubs in Colombia, Guatemala and Argentina as well as his native country.
