= Israel Damonte =

Argentine footballer and manager

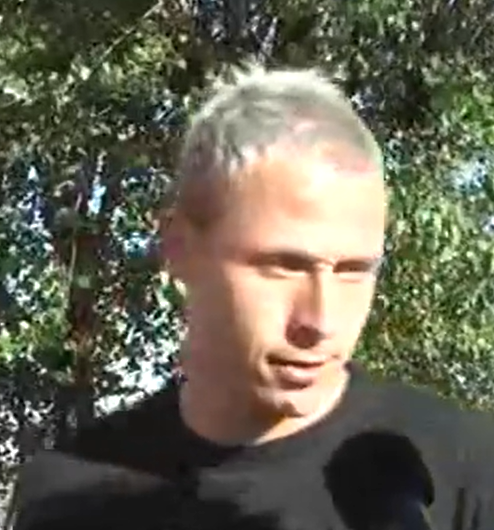
- Damonte in 2017

Personal information
- Full name: Israel Alejandro Damonte
- Date of birth: 6 January 1982 (age 44)
- Place of birth: Salto, Buenos Aires, Argentina
- Height: 1.75 m (5 ft 9 in)
- Position: Midfielder

Youth career
- Estudiantes

Senior career*
| Years | Team | Apps | (Gls) |
| 2000–2003 | Estudiantes | 18 | (0) |
| 2002 | → Quilmes (loan) | 13 | (0) |
| 2004–2005 | San Martín de Mendoza | 27 | (2) |
| 2005–2006 | Gimnasia de Jujuy | 32 | (5) |
| 2006–2007 | Veracruz | 7 | (0) |
| 2007 | → Nueva Chicago (loan) | 20 | (0) |
| 2007 | Arsenal de Sarandí | 8 | (0) |
| 2008–2010 | Asteras Tripolis | 31 | (1) |
| 2010–2012 | Godoy Cruz | 39 | (1) |
| 2012–2013 | Nacional | 29 | (1) |
| 2013–2018 | Estudiantes | 91 | (7) |
| 2018–2019 | Huracán | 36 | (3) |
| 2019 | Banfield | 4 | (0) |
| Total | | 355 | (20) |

Managerial career
- 2020–2021: Huracán
- 2021: Arsenal de Sarandí
- 2021–2023: Sarmiento
- 2023: Colón
- 2024: Sarmiento
- 2026: Boston River
- 2026: Aldosivi
- * Club domestic league appearances and goals

Israel Alejandro Damonte (born 6 January 1982) is an Argentine football manager and former player who played as a midfielder.

== Biography ==
Damonte was born in Salto, an important agricultural town in northern Buenos Aires Province.

== Career ==
Damonte started his professional career playing with Estudiantes de La Plata in 2000. After not having much continuity, he was sent on loan to Quilmes for six months. Then he returned to Estudiantes till the end of 2003.

During 2004 to mid-2005, he remained playing for San Martín de Mendoza.

In July 2005, he signed a new contract with Argentine Primera División side Gimnasia y Esgrima de Jujuy where he played a total of 33 matches and scored 5 goals.

In May 2006, he signed a three-year deal with the Mexican team Veracruz. Soon after not having much continuity with the first team, he was loaned for half a season to Nueva Chicago.

In August 2007, Israel was transferred to Arsenal de Sarandí, were his outstanding performances helped the team win the 2007 Copa Sudamericana. He scored a goal in the round of 16 against Brazilian club Goiás. In January 2008, he signed a two years contract with Super League Greece club Asteras Tripoli.

In August 2010, Damonte joined Godoy Cruz. In January 2012, he signed for Nacional. In January 2013, he signed for Estudiantes. In January 2018, he signed for Huracán.

== Coaching career ==
Damonte retired at the end of 2019 and on 2 January 2020, he was announced manager of his former club, Huracán.

=== Managerial statistics ===
As of 21 June 2021

| Team | Nat | From | To | Record | | | | |
| Team | Nat | From | To | G | W | D | L | Win % |
|---|---|---|---|---|---|---|---|---|
| Huracán | (Argentina) | 3 January 2020 | 17 March 2021 | 26 | 6 | 7 | 13 | 23.08 |
| Total | | | | 26 | 6 | 7 | 13 | 23.08 |

== Honours ==
| Season | Club | Title |
|---|---|---|
| 2007 | Arsenal de Sarandí | Copa Sudamericana |
| 2011 | Nacional | Torneo Apertura |
| 2011-12 | Nacional | Uruguayan Primera División |
