= Daniel Leites =

Uruguayan footballer (born 1982)

Personal information
- Full name: Daniel Leites
- Date of birth: 28 February 1982 (age 44)
- Place of birth: Montevideo, Uruguay
- Height: 1.76 m (5 ft 9 in)
- Position: Defender

Youth career
- –2002: Nacional

Senior career*
Years	Team	Apps	(Gls)
2002–2007	Nacional		
2007	Wanderers		
2007–2008	CA Fénix		
2008–2010	C.A. Cerro	25	(1)
2010–2011	Tiro Federal	10	(0)
2011–2013	Cerro Largo	41	(1)
2013–2015	C.A. Cerro	44	(1)
2015	→ Villa Teresa (loan)	13	(0)
2015–2016	Villa Teresa	14	(0)
- * Club domestic league appearances and goals as of 15 May 2016

Daniel Leites (born February 28, 1982, in Montevideo) is a Uruguayan footballer currently a free agent after being released by Villa Teresa in January 2016.
