= Marcos Aguirre =

Argentine footballer

Personal information
- Full name: Marcos Sebastián Aguirre
- Date of birth: March 30, 1984 (age 42)
- Place of birth: Arroyito, Córdoba, Argentina
- Height: 1.70 m (5 ft 7 in)
- Position: Winger

Youth career
- 1997–1998: Renato Cesarini
- 1998–2003: Lanús

Senior career*
Years	Team	Apps	(Gls)
2004–2011	Lanús	133	(13)
2008–2009	→ Valladolid (loan)	24	(1)
2011	→ Arsenal de Sarandí (loan)	8	(0)
2011	→ San Martín SJ (loan)	13	(0)
2012	Nacional	6	(1)
2012–2013	Instituto	31	(5)
2013–2014	Aragua	33	(4)
2014–2015	Instituto	17	(2)
2015	Deportes Antofagasta	24	(5)
2016	Atlético Bucaramanga	13	(2)
2016–2017	Nueva Chicago	22	(1)
2017	Deportivo Pasto	15	(0)
2018–2019	Talleres RdE	29	(2)
2019	Deportivo Camioneros	8	(1)
- * Club domestic league appearances and goals

Marcos Sebastián Aguirre (born March 30, 1984, in Arroyito, Córdoba) is an Argentine former football winger.

== Career ==
As a youth player, Aguirre was with Renato Cesarini before joining Lanús at the age of 14. He started his professional career in 2004 with Lanús, gradually establishing himself as an important member of the first team. In 2007, he was part of the squad that won the Apertura 2007 tournament, Lanús' first ever top flight title.

In January 2008, Aguirre was loaned to Real Valladolid, being unsuccessful during a one‑and‑a‑half‑year stint, as he was mainly used as a substitute. He did, however, score on the last day of the 2008–09 season in a crucial relegation match away to Real Betis which ended 1–1, after having replaced injured Pedro León. Betis eventually relegated with that draw, but the Castile and León outfit maintained its status. Upon the end of his loan spell, Aguirre returned to Lanús in 2009.

Back in Argentina, Aguirre scored the first goal of the 2010–11 Argentine Primera División season in a 2–1 win over Arsenal de Sarandí. At the end of the semester, the winger was loaned again by Lanús, this time to Arsenal de Sarandí.

His last club was Deportivo Camioneros in 2019.

== Honours ==
Season	Team	Title
Apertura 2007	Lanús	Argentine League
