= Pablo Álvarez (Uruguayan footballer) =

Uruguayan footballer (born 1985)

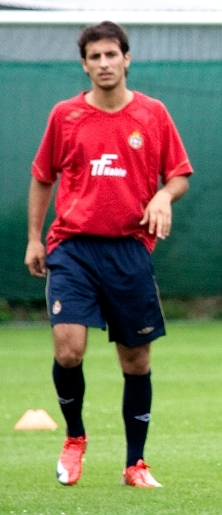

Personal information
- Full name: Pablo Álvarez Menéndez
- Date of birth: 7 February 1985 (age 41)
- Place of birth: Montevideo, Uruguay
- Height: 1.75 m (5 ft 9 in)
- Position: Defender

Youth career
- Nacional

Senior career*
| Years | Team | Apps | (Gls) |
| 2007 | Nacional | 12 | (0) |
| 2009–2010 | → Wisła Kraków (loan) | 26 | (0) |
| 2010–2011 | → Panserraikos (loan) | 16 | (0) |
| 2012–2014 | Nacional | 50 | (1) |
| 2015–2016 | Universidad Católica | 11 | (0) |
| 2016–2021 | Boston River | 130 | (4) |

International career
| 2007 | Uruguay | 1 | (0) |
- * Club domestic league appearances and goals

Pablo Álvarez Menéndez (born 7 February 1985) is a Uruguayan former professional footballer who played as a right-back.

== Club career ==
=== Nacional ===
Álvarez began his professional career playing with Club Nacional de Football in 2007. He played the Copa Libertadores where his team got to quarterfinals. Later he won the Liguilla 2007 tournament which qualified his team for the 2008 edition of the Copa Libertadores.

=== Reggina ===
His talent did not go unnoticed and he was signed by Reggina on a 4-year contract. He made his Serie A debut on 7 October 2007 against U.S. Città di Palermo.

=== Wisła Kraków ===
In July 2009 he was loaned out one season to the Polish giant club Wisła Kraków. He had an excellent campaign with his team getting to the second position in the 2009-2010 league.

=== Panserraikos ===
On 31 August 2010, Álvarez signed another loan deal but with the Greek club Panserraikos.

=== Nacional ===
On 4 January 2012, he returned to his native country to play for Nacional.

== International career ==
Álvarez has earned one cap with Uruguay on 12 September 2007 against South Africa.

== Career statistics ==
As of match played 13 November 2016

Appearances and goals by club, season and competition
| Club | Season | League | | | National cup (Note: Includes Coppa Italia, Polish Cup, Copa Chile) | | Continental | | Total | |
| Club | Season | Division | Apps | Goals | Apps | Goals | Apps | Goals | Apps | Goals |
|---|---|---|---|---|---|---|---|---|---|---|
| Nacional | 2006–07 | Liga AUF Uruguaya | 12 | 0 | — | | 9 (Note: Appearances in Copa Libertadores) | 0 | 21 | 0 |
| Reggina | 2007–08 | Serie A | 12 | 0 | 2 | 0 | — | | 14 | 0 |
| Reggina | 2008–09 | Serie A | 9 | 0 | 2 | 0 | — | | 11 | 0 |
| Reggina | Total | | 21 | 0 | 4 | 0 | — | | 25 | 0 |
| Wisła Kraków | 2009–10 | Ekstraklasa | 26 | 0 | 4 | 0 | — | | 30 | 0 |
| Panserraikos | 2010–11 | Super League Greece | 16 | 0 | — | | — | | 16 | 0 |
| Nacional | 2011–12 | Liga AUF Uruguaya | 2 | 0 | — | | — | | 2 | 0 |
| Nacional | 2012–13 | Liga AUF Uruguaya | 22 | 1 | — | | 10 (Note: Eight appearances in Copa Libertadores, two appearances in Copa Sudamericana) | 0 | 32 | 1 |
| Nacional | 2013–14 | Liga AUF Uruguaya | 22 | 0 | — | | 5 | 0 | 27 | 0 |
| Nacional | Total | | 58 | 1 | — | | 24 | 0 | 82 | 1 |
| Universidad Católica | 2014–15 | Liga de Primera | 8 | 0 | — | | — | | 8 | 0 |
| Universidad Católica | 2015–16 | Liga de Primera | 3 | 0 | 3 | 0 | 2 (Note: Appearances in Copa Sudamericana) | 0 | 8 | 0 |
| Universidad Católica | Total | | 11 | 0 | 3 | 0 | 2 | 0 | 16 | 0 |
| Boston River | 2016 | Liga AUF Uruguaya | 11 | 0 | — | | — | | 11 | 0 |
| Career total | | | 143 | 1 | 11 | 0 | 26 | 0 | 180 | 1 |
