= Diego Placente =

Argentine footballer (born 1977)

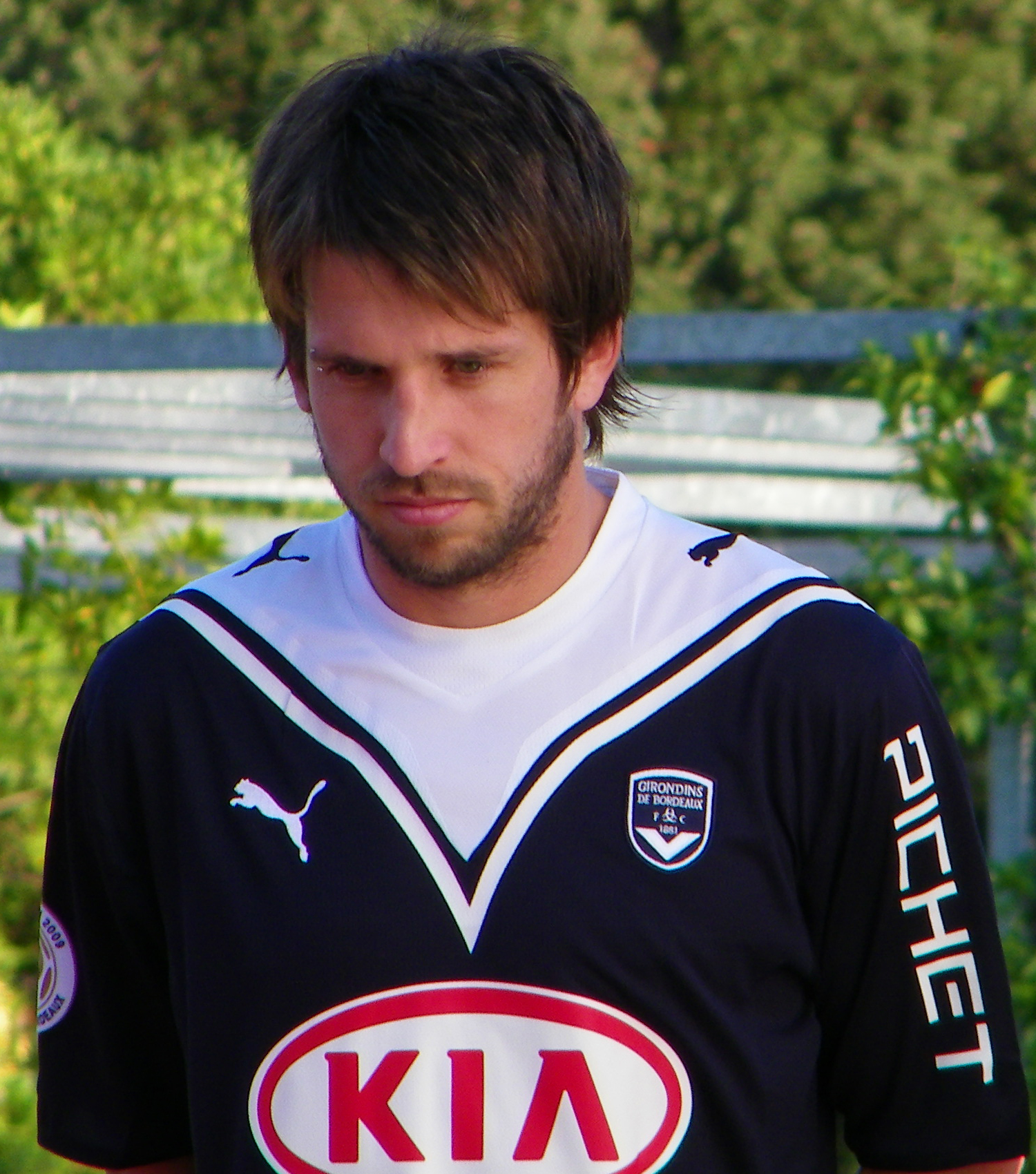
- Placente with Bordeaux in 2009

Personal information
- Full name: Diego Rodolfo Placente
- Date of birth: 24 April 1977 (age 49)
- Place of birth: Buenos Aires, Argentina
- Height: 1.76 m (5 ft 9 in)
- Position: Left-back

Team information
- Current team: Argentina U20 (manager)

Senior career*
Years	Team	Apps	(Gls)
1995–1997	Argentinos Juniors	36	(0)
1997–2001	River Plate	110	(5)
2001–2005	Bayer Leverkusen	123	(3)
2005–2007	Celta Vigo	59	(0)
2008	San Lorenzo	14	(0)
2008–2010	Bordeaux	9	(0)
2010–2011	San Lorenzo	16	(0)
2011–2012	Nacional	11	(0)
2012–2013	Argentinos Juniors	16	(1)
Total		394	(9)

International career
1997	Argentina U20	7	(1)
2000–2005	Argentina	22	(0)

Managerial career
- 2014–2015: Argentinos Juniors (assistant)
- 2017–2024: Argentina U15 (assistant)
- 2023–: Argentina U17
- 2025–: Argentina U20
Medal record
Men's football
Representing Argentina (as player)
FIFA U-20 World Cup
Winner	1997 Malaysia
South American U-20 Championship
Winner	1997 Chile
Representing Argentina (as manager)
South American U-17 Championship
Third place	2023 Ecuador
FIFA U-20 World Cup
Runner-up	2025 Chile
South American U-20 Championship
Runner-up	2025 Venezuela
- * Club domestic league appearances and goals

Diego Rodolfo Placente (born 24 April 1977) is an Argentine manager and former footballer who played as a left-back. He is the current manager of the Argentina U20 national team and Argentina national under-17 football team.

== Club career ==
Born in Buenos Aires, Placente started playing professionally in 1996 with Argentinos Juniors, before moving to Argentine giant River Plate in 1997. He transferred to Bayer 04 Leverkusen in 2001, where he played until 2005 when his contract expired. Subsequently, he turned down an offer from English club Everton FC to join Celta de Vigo. While at Leverkusen he played in the 2002 UEFA Champions League Final.

In 2008, he returned to Argentina to play for San Lorenzo de Almagro. In the 2008 summer transfer window, he transferred to the French side of Bordeaux, and penned a two-year contract. After finishing that contract, he returned to San Lorenzo on a free transfer.

== International career ==
Placente played his first match with the Argentina national team in 2001, and was capped 22 times.

== Career statistics ==
=== International ===
Argentina national team
Year	Apps	Goals
2000	1	0
2001	2	0
2002	5	0
2003	6	0
2004	6	0
2005	2	0
Total	22	0

== Honours ==
=== Player ===
Argentinos Juniors

- Primera B Nacional: 1996–97

River Plate

- Argentina Primera Division: 1997 Apertura, 1999 Apertura, 2000 Clausura
- Supercopa Libertadores: 1997

Bayer Leverkusen

- DFB-Pokal runner-up: 2001–02
- UEFA Champions League runner-up: 2001–02

Bordeaux

- Ligue 1: 2008–09
- Trophée des Champions: 2008, 2009
- Coupe de la Ligue: 2009

Nacional

- Uruguayan Primera División: 2012

Argentina U20

- South American Youth Championship: 1997
- FIFA U-20 World Cup: 1997

Argentina

- Copa América runner-up: 2004
- FIFA Confederations Cup runner-up: 2005

=== Manager ===
Argentina U15

- South American Under-15 Football Championship: 2017

Argentina U17

- L'Alcúdia International Football Tournament: 2025
