= John Varela =

Colombian footballer (born 1987)

Personal information
- Full name: John Edinson Varela Prado
- Date of birth: 6 September 1987 (age 39)
- Place of birth: Cali, Colombia

Senior career*
Years	Team	Apps	(Gls)
2009–2013	River Plate	41	(3)
2013–2015	Cortuluá	85	(2)
2016	Deportivo Pasto	33	(2)
2017	Águilas Doradas	7	(0)
2018	Cortuluá	24	(2)
Total		190	(9)
- * Club domestic league appearances and goals

John Edinson Varela Prado (born 6 September 1987) is a Colombian former footballer who began his playing career at Uruguayan club River Plate and then returned to Colombia where he played for Cortuluá, Deportivo Pasto and Águilas Doradas.
