= Raúl Poclaba =

Argentine footballer

Personal information
- Full name: Raúl Fernando Poclaba
- Date of birth: 23 January 1990 (age 36)
- Place of birth: Ledesma, Argentina
- Height: 1.83 m (6 ft 0 in)
- Position: Defender

Youth career
- –2011: Racing

Senior career*
Years	Team	Apps	(Gls)
2011–2013	Racing	3	(0)
2011	→ Nacional (loan)	1	(0)
2013–2016	Gimnasia y Esgrima	76	(1)
2016–2017	Aldosivi	4	(0)
2017	Douglas Haig	10	(1)
2017–2018	Gimnasia y Tiro	23	(0)
2018	Portuguesa	12	(0)
- * Club domestic league appearances and goals as of 13 February 2019

Raúl Fernando Poclaba (born 23 January 1990) is an Argentine professional footballer who plays as a defender, most recently for Portuguesa.

== Career ==
=== Club ===
Poclaba started his professional career in 2011 with Racing, he made his debut for the club in the Argentine Primera División on 13 February against All Boys. After two further appearances in his debut season, 2010–11, Poclaba was loaned out later in the year to Uruguayan Primera División side Nacional. He made just 1 appearance for Nacional. Upon returning to Racing, he failed to make an appearance in two seasons for the club and left in 2013 to join Primera B Nacional club Gimnasia y Esgrima. After three successful seasons with Gimnasia, which included 77 appearances and 1 goal, he departed three years after joining as he completed a move to Argentine Primera División club Aldosivi. He made his Aldosivi debut versus Tigre on 21 May 2016. On 28 February 2017, Poclaba joined Primera B Nacional side Douglas Haig.

On 13 September 2017, Poclaba signed for Gimnasia y Tiro.

== Career statistics ==
=== Club ===
As of 12 March 2017.

Club statistics
Club	Season	League			Cup (Note: Includes the Copa Argentina.)		League Cup		Continental (Note: Includes the Copa Libertadores and Copa Sudamericana.)		Other		Total	
Club	Season	Division	Apps	Goals	Apps	Goals	Apps	Goals	Apps	Goals	Apps	Goals	Apps	Goals
Racing	2010–11	Argentine Primera División	3	0	0	0	—		—		0	0	3	0
Racing	2011–12	Argentine Primera División	0	0	0	0	—		—		0	0	0	0
Racing	2012–13	Argentine Primera División	0	0	0	0	—		0	0	0	0	0	0
Racing	Total		3	0	0	0	—		0	0	0	0	3	0
Nacional (loan)	2011–12	Uruguayan Primera División	1	0	0	0	—		0	0	0	0	1	0
Gimnasia y Esgrima	2013–14	Primera B Nacional	19	0	1	0	—		—		0	0	20	0
Gimnasia y Esgrima	2014	Primera B Nacional	21	0	0	0	—		—		0	0	21	0
Gimnasia y Esgrima	2015	Primera B Nacional	36	1	0	0	—		—		0	0	36	1
Gimnasia y Esgrima	Total		76	1	1	0	—		—		0	0	77	1
Aldosivi	2016	Argentine Primera División	1	0	0	0	—		—		0	0	1	0
Aldosivi	2016–17	Argentine Primera División	3	0	0	0	—		—		0	0	3	0
Aldosivi	Total		4	0	0	0	—		—		0	0	4	0
Douglas Haig	2016–17	Primera B Nacional	1	0	0	0	—		—		0	0	1	0
Douglas Haig	Total		1	0	0	0	—		—		0	0	1	0
Career total			85	1	1	0	—		0	0	0	0	86	1
