= José Quezada =

Chilean footballer (born 1990)

Personal information
- Full name: José Antonio Quezada Salazar
- Date of birth: 17 August 1990 (age 36)
- Place of birth: Santiago, Chile
- Height: 1.78 m (5 ft 10 in)
- Position: Goalkeeper

Senior career*
Years	Team	Apps	(Gls)
2009–2015	Palestino	29	(0)
2015–2017	Magallanes	35	(0)
2017	Unión Española	0	(0)
2019	Cobreloa	0	(0)
2023	Deportes Recoleta	0	(0)

International career
2011	Chile	0	(0)
- * Club domestic league appearances and goals as of 27 December 2023

José Antonio Quezada Salazar (born 17 August 1990) is a Chilean footballer.

== Club career ==
In 2023, he returned to the professional football by signing with Deportes Recoleta after three years.

== International career ==
In December 2011 Quezada was called up by Claudio Borghi to the Chile national team nominee that played with Paraguay. However, he was chosen as back-up of first-choice Luis Marín and didn't play in the 3–2 win at La Serena.
