= Renato César =

Uruguayan footballer (born 1993)

Personal information
- Full name: Renato César Pérez
- Date of birth: 16 August 1993 (age 33)
- Place of birth: Maldonado, Uruguay
- Height: 1.78 m (5 ft 10 in)
- Position: Forward

Team information
- Current team: Deportivo Maldonado
- Number: 16

Senior career*
Years	Team	Apps	(Gls)
2011–2015	Nacional	28	(4)
2014–2015	→ Lugano (loan)	14	(1)
2015	→ Liverpool MVD (loan)	11	(1)
2016–2017	Villa Española	21	(1)
2017	→ Palestino (loan)	8	(1)
2017	Rentistas	49	(16)
2018	→ Inter Playa	16	(3)
2018–2021	Rentistas	0	(0)
2021–2024	Guayaquil City	74	(11)
2024–	Deportivo Maldonado	12	(0)

International career^{‡}
2012–2013	Uruguay U20	15	(4)
Medal record
Representing Uruguay
Men's Football
South American U-20 Championship
Third place	2013 Argentina
- * Club domestic league appearances and goals as of 7 March 2020 ‡ National team caps and goals as of 31 January 2013

Renato César Pérez (born 16 August 1993) is a Uruguayan footballer who plays as a forward for Deportivo Maldonado.

== National ==
He has been capped by the Uruguay national under-20 football team.

=== U20 International goals ===
No.	Date	Venue	Opponent	Score	Result	Competition	Ref.
1.	8 June 2012	Estadio Parque Alfredo Víctor Viera, Montevideo, Uruguay	United States	2–0	2–0	Friendly match	
2.	5 September 2012	Parque Federico Ómar Saroldi, Montevideo, Uruguay	Paraguay	1–0	2–0	Friendly match	
3.	11 October 2012	Estadio Luis Franzini, Montevideo, Uruguay	Peru	1–0	2–1	Friendly match	
