= Luis Alegría =

Chilean footballer (born 1980)

Personal information
- Full name: Luis Anthony Alegría Quijón
- Date of birth: 21 November 1980 (age 45)
- Place of birth: Santiago, Chile
- Height: 1.79 m (5 ft 10 in)
- Position: Defender

Senior career*
Years	Team	Apps	(Gls)
1999–2003	U. de Concepción	84	(4)
2003–2007	Antofagasta	120	(6)
2008–2010	Ñublense	96	(8)
2011	Deportes Concepción	37	(3)
2012	Everton	15	(1)
2012–2013	Cobresal	25	(1)
2013–2014	San Marcos de Arica	23	(1)
2014–2016	Deportes Concepción	31	(3)
- * Club domestic league appearances and goals as of 28 July 2015

Luis Anthony Alegría Quijón (born 21 November 1980) is a former Chilean footballer. His last club was Deportes Concepción.
