= Martín Tejera =

Uruguayan footballer (born 1991)

Personal information
- Full name: Martín Tejera Vázquez
- Date of birth: 16 February 1991 (age 35)
- Place of birth: Montevideo, Uruguay
- Height: 1.88 m (6 ft 2 in)
- Position: Goalkeeper

Youth career
- Nacional

Senior career*
Years	Team	Apps	(Gls)
2012–2013	Nacional	0	(0)
2012–2013	Boston River	2	(0)
2014	Rentistas	3	(0)
2015	Quevedo		
2016	Progreso	0	(0)

International career
2010	Uruguay U-20		
- * Club domestic league appearances and goals as of 17:42, 28 May 2020 (UTC)

Martín Tejera Vázquez (born 16 February 1991) is a Uruguayan footballer who played as a goalkeeper in different teams and retired in 2016.

== Honours ==
Nacional

- Uruguayan Primera División: 2008–09, 2010–11, 2011–12
