= Matías Sosa (footballer, born 1992) =

Argentine footballer

Personal information
- Full name: Nello Matías Sosa
- Date of birth: February 26, 1992 (age 34)
- Place of birth: Neuquén, Argentina
- Height: 1.86 m (6 ft 1 in)
- Position: Attacking midfielder

Team information
- Current team: Sol de Mayo

Youth career
- 2007–2010: Estudiantes de LP

Senior career*
Years	Team	Apps	(Gls)
2010–2011	Boston River	8	(2)
2011	Sporting Gijón B	10	(0)
2011–2013	Nacional	13	(0)
2012	→ River Plate (loan)	2	(0)
2013–2015	Colón	14	(0)
2015–2020	Cipolletti	84	(10)
2016	→ America-RJ (loan)	8	(1)
2017	→ Portuguesa-RJ (loan)	8	(1)
2019	→ America-RJ (loan)	21	(2)
2020–2022	Boston River	2	(0)
2022	Cipolletti	19	(3)
2023–	Sol de Mayo	3	(0)

International career
2007	Argentina U-15		
2009	Argentina U-17	2	(0)
- * Club domestic league appearances and goals as of 18:04, 23 December 2023 (UTC)

Nello Matías Sosa (born February 26, 1992, in Neuquén) is an Argentine football player who plays for Sol de Mayo.

== International career ==
In 2009 Sosa played with the Argentina Under-17 at the 2009 FIFA World Cup in Nigeria.
