= Adolfo Lima =

Uruguayan footballer (born 1990)

Personal information
- Full name: Adolfo Justino Lima Camejo
- Date of birth: July 24, 1990 (age 36)
- Place of birth: Melo, Uruguay
- Height: 1.76 m (5 ft 9 in)
- Positions: Left midfielder; right midfielder

Senior career*
Years	Team	Apps	(Gls)
2008–2010	Juventud	53	(2)
2010–2012	Cerro Largo	46	(7)
2012–2016	Unión San Felipe	12	(4)
2013	→ Ñublense (loan)	14	(0)
2013	→ Cerro Largo (loan)	12	(4)
2014	→ Patronato (loan)	9	(0)
2015–2016	→ Al-Wehda (loan)	21	(1)
2016–2017	Al-Wehda	19	(3)
2017	Liverpool	4	(0)
2018	Unión San Felipe	18	(1)
2019	Cerro Largo	30	(5)
2020	Defensor Sporting	11	(2)
2021	Belgrano	11	(0)
2021	Deportivo Maldonado	14	(0)
2022–2023	Cerro Largo	49	(0)
- * Club domestic league appearances and goals as of 4 September 2024

Adolfo Justino Lima Camejo (born July 24, 1990) is a Uruguayan footballer who played as a midfielder.

Lima has previously played for Juventud de Las Piedras, Cerro Largo and Unión San Felipe, where he was loaned out several times. He played for Al-Wehda in the Saudi Professional League between 2015 and 2017, before moving to Uruguayan club Liverpool on a free transfer in July 2017.
