= Fabián Trujillo =

Uruguayan footballer (born 1986)

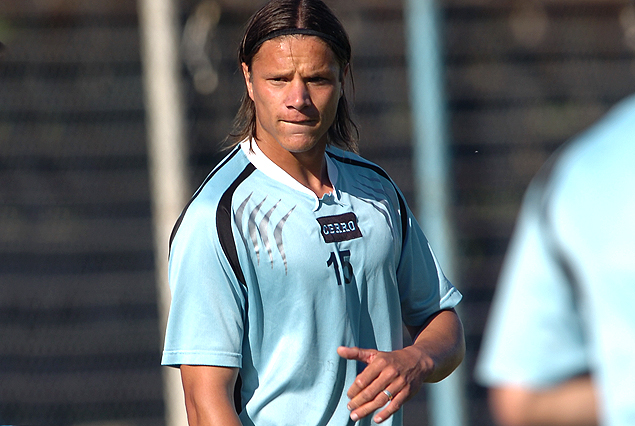

Fabián Trujillo (born July 6, 1986, in Montevideo) is a Uruguayan footballer who plays for La Luz FC.

== Career ==
He had a short spell with Omani giants, Dhofar S.C.S.C. in Salalah.

In 2010, he played the Copa Libertadores with C.A. Cerro.

== Teams ==
- (Uruguay) Cerro 2007–2009
- (Oman) Dhofar S.C.S.C. 2009
- (Uruguay) Cerro 2009–2011
- (Uruguay) Fenix 2011–2012
- (Uruguay) Cerro 2012–2013

== Honours ==
Cerro

- Liguilla Pre-Libertadores 2009
