= Marcelo Tulbovitz =

Uruguayan footballer

Marcelo Tulbovitz, River Plate

Marcelo Tulbovitz Dembovich (born August 12, 1961 in Montevideo, Uruguay), his parents were of Latvian and Polish ancestry. he is held in high regard among the teams comprising CONMEBOL and CONCACAF.

== Career ==
Tulbovitz career has brought him through many organizations, including several in Uruguay. He began his football career immediately following his graduation from university in 1986. He won national titles while with CA Progreso, Defensor Sporting Club, Club Nacional de Football, Club Atlético River Plate (Montevideo) and Racing Club de Montevideo of the Primera División Uruguaya.

International teams also flourished with his guidance, including CD Cobresal of the Chilean First Division, and the El Salvador national football team. After coaching Club León's youth sides, he moved to Costa Rica in 2003 to join Hernan Medford's coaching staff at Deportivo Saprissa. Since joining the Costa Rica team they have won the Uncaf Cup and the CONCACAF Champions Cup, which allowed them to compete in the 2005 FIFA Club World Championship in Japan. Saprissa finished 3rd.

From October, 2006 through 2008 the Costa Rican Football Federation, named Hernan Medford and his staff to coach Costa Rica national football team. After being sacked from the national team due to poor performance, he continued his career as athletic coach for San Carlos, a team in the first division of Costa Rica. He was then appointed again as the athletic coach for the Costa Rica national team on September 16, 2009 with head coach René Simoes on charge.

On October 14, 2009 during a World Cup qualifying match against the United States, Tulbovitz briefly managed the Costa Rica national team on the pitch after Simoes and his assistant, Luis Arnaez were ejected for arguing with the officials. Under his watch, Costa Rica gave up a late goal and settled for a tie in the match, jeopardizing the team's chances to qualify for the 2010 FIFA World Cup.
