= Jadson Viera =

Brazilian footballer and manager

Personal information
- Full name: Jadson Viera Castro Gonçalves
- Date of birth: 4 August 1981 (age 45)
- Place of birth: Santana do Livramento, Brazil
- Height: 1.92 m (6 ft 4 in)
- Position: Centre back

Team information
- Current team: Independiente (head coach)

Youth career
- 1996–2000: Cantareira

Senior career*
Years	Team	Apps	(Gls)
2001–2007	Danubio	141	(7)
2005	→ Atlante (loan)	14	(1)
2007–2010	Lanús	65	(1)
2010–2011	Vasco da Gama	2	(0)
2011	→ Nacional Montevideo (loan)	5	(0)
2012	Nacional Montevideo	17	(0)
2013–2016	Danubio	31	(0)
2016–2017	Rentistas	13	(0)

Managerial career
- 2018: Nacional (assistant)
- 2019–2021: Talleres (assistant)
- 2022: Internacional (assistant)
- 2022–2023: Vélez Sarsfield (assistant)
- 2024–2025: Boston River
- 2025–2026: Nacional Montevideo
- 2026–: Independiente
- * Club domestic league appearances and goals

Jadson Viera Castro Gonçalves (born 4 August 1981), known as Jadson Viera or just Jadson, is a Brazilian football manager and former player who played as a central defender. He is the manager of Argentine club Independiente.

Born in Brazil, Jadson also holds Uruguayan nationality.

== Playing career ==
Jadson was born in Santana do Livramento, Rio Grande do Sul, a city on the border with Uruguay, and started his professional career in 2001 with Danubio in Uruguay. With the club, he won two Apertura, three Clausura and two overall Uruguayan Primera División titles.

Jadson spent part of 2005 on loan at Atlante in Mexico before returning to Uruguay in 2006. After helping Danubio claim the overall league championship in 2007, he moved to Argentina to join Lanús, where he helped the club to win the 2007 Apertura tournament, their first ever top flight league title.

In July 2010, Jadson signed with Vasco da Gama. After featuring rarely, he returned to Uruguay on 3 February 2011, after being loaned to Nacional.

Jadson subsequently signed a permanent deal with Nacional for the 2012 season, but returned to his first club Danubio in 2013. He retired in 2017, after a brief spell with Rentistas.

== Coaching career ==
After retiring, Viera was appointed assistant coach at Nacional under manager Alexander Medina. The duo left the club at the end of the year.

Viera followed Medina to Argentine club Talleres de Córdoba in June 2019, and remained working as his assistant at Internacional and Vélez Sarsfield. On 18 December 2023, he was appointed manager of Boston River for the upcoming campaign.

On 27 October 2025, Viera replaced Pablo Peirano as manager of Nacional Montevideo. He led the club to the league title at the end of the season, but was sacked on 21 March 2026, after a poor start of the year.

On 15 August 2026, Viera was appointed manager of Argentine club Independiente.

== Managerial statistics ==
As of match played 18 October 2026

Managerial record by team and tenure
Team	Nat	From	To	Record							
Team	Nat	From	To	G	W	D	L	GF	GA	GD	Win %
Boston River	(Uruguay)	18 December 2023	27 October 2025	89	39	21	29	117	96	+21	43.82
Nacional	(Uruguay)	27 October 2025	21 March 2026	12	4	5	3	12	11	+1	33.33
Independiente	(Argentina)	15 August 2026	present	8	2	4	2	6	10	−4	25.00
Total				109	45	30	34	135	117	+18	41.28

== Honours ==
=== Player ===
Danubio

- Uruguayan Primera División: 2004, 2006–07, 2013–14

Lanús

- Argentine Primera División: 2007 Apertura

Nacional Montevideo

- Uruguayan Primera División: 2010–11, 2011–12

=== Coach ===
Nacional Montevideo

- Liga AUF Uruguaya: 2025
