= Miguel Escalona =

Spanish professional footballer

Personal information
- Full name: Miguel Escalona Verano
- Date of birth: 22 November 1983 (age 42)
- Place of birth: Logroño, Spain
- Height: 1.88 m (6 ft 2 in)
- Position: Goalkeeper

Youth career
- 1999–2000: CD Logroñés
- 2000–2001: Athletic Bilbao

Senior career*
Years	Team	Apps	(Gls)
2001–2002	Basconia	24	(0)
2002–2004	Bilbao Athletic	64	(0)
2004–2006	Athletic Bilbao	0	(0)
2005	→ Racing Ferrol (loan)	2	(0)
2006–2007	Logroñés CF	21	(0)
2008	Mazarrón	6	(0)
2008–2009	Guijuelo	34	(0)
2009–2012	Lugo	89	(0)
2012–2014	Guadalajara	2	(0)
2014	AEK Larnaca	10	(0)
2014–2017	UCAM Murcia	55	(0)

International career
2002	Spain U21	1	(0)
- * Club domestic league appearances and goals as of 00:00, 8 February 2016 (UTC)

Miguel Escalona Verano (born 22 November 1983 in Logroño, La Rioja) is a Spanish former professional footballer who played as a goalkeeper. He later worked as a specialist goalkeeping coach at Elche CF.

== Club statistics ==
Club	Season	League			Cup		Other		Total	
Club	Season	Division	Apps	Goals	Apps	Goals	Apps	Goals	Apps	Goals
Basconia	2000–01	Tercera División	3	0	—		—		3	0
Basconia	2001–02	Tercera División	21	0	—		—		21	0
Basconia	Total		24	0	0	0	0	0	24	0
Bilbao Athletic	2002–03	Segunda División B	33	0	—		3 (Note: Appearances in Promotion play-offs)	0	36	0
Bilbao Athletic	2003–04	Segunda División B	28	0	—		—		28	0
Bilbao Athletic	Total		61	0	0	0	3	0	64	0
Racing Ferrol (loan)	2004–05	Segunda División	2	0	1	0	—		3	0
Logroñés	2006–07	Segunda División B	11	0	—		—		11	0
Logroñés	2007–08	Segunda División B	10	0	—		—		10	0
Logroñés	Total		21	0	0	0	0	0	21	0
Mazarrón	2007–08	Segunda División B	6	0	—		—		6	0
Guijuelo	2008–09	Segunda División B	34	0	—		—		34	0
Lugo	2009–10	Segunda División B	38	0	—		—		38	0
Lugo	2010–11	Segunda División B	36	0	—		6	0	42	0
Lugo	2011–12	Segunda División B	7	0	—		2	0	9	0
Lugo	Total		81	0	0	0	8	0	89	0
Guadalajara	2012–13	Segunda División	2	0	1	0	—		3	0
AEK Larnaca	2013–14	Cypriot First Division	10	0	2	0	—		12	0
UCAM Murcia	2014–15	Segunda División B	25	0	3	0	—		28	0
UCAM Murcia	2015–16	Segunda División B	19	0	2	0	—		21	0
UCAM Murcia	Total		44	0	5	0	8	0	49	0
Career total			285	0	9	0	11	0	307	0
