= Darwin Torres =

Uruguayan footballer (born 1991)

Personal information
- Full name: Darwin Fabián Torres Alonso
- Date of birth: 16 February 1991 (age 35)
- Place of birth: José Pedro Varela, Uruguay
- Height: 1.80 m (5 ft 11 in)
- Position: Centre-back

Team information
- Current team: Municipal
- Number: 14

Youth career
- Club Atlético Fernandino
- 2004–2011: Nacional Montevideo

Senior career*
Years	Team	Apps	(Gls)
2011–2014	Nacional Montevideo	21	(0)
2013	→ Racing Montevideo (loan)	12	(0)
2013–2014	→ Juventud (loan)	12	(0)
2014–2015	Racing Club	37	(0)
2016	Cimarrones de Sonora	32	(0)
2017	Zacatepec	18	(1)
2017–2018	Cerro	45	(2)
2019–2020	Correcaminos UAT	24	(1)
2020–2021	Montevideo Wanderers	14	(1)
2023–	Municipal	0	(0)
- * Club domestic league appearances and goals as of 14:37, 17 November 2020 (UTC)

Darwin Fabián Torres Alonso (born 16 February 1991) is a Uruguayan professional footballer who plays as a centre-back for and captains Liga Nacional club Municipal.

== Honours ==
=== Club ===
Nacional

- Uruguayan Primera División (1): 2011–12

Municipal

- Liga Nacional de Guatemala (1): Clausura 2024
