= Marcelo Mansilla =

Uruguayan footballer (born 1981)

Marcelo Adrián Mansilla Iriarte (born 10 March 1981, in Montevideo) is a Uruguayan former professional footballer who played as a midfielder.

== Clubs ==
- Central Español 2001–2004
- Nacional 2005–2006
- Miramar Misiones 2007–2008
- Universidad César Vallejo 2008–2009
- Cerro 2010–2011
- Liverpool 2011–2013

== Honours ==
Nacional

- Uruguayan Primera División: 2005, 2005–06
