= Santiago Romero =

Uruguayan footballer (born 1990)

Personal information
- Full name: Santiago Ernesto Romero Fernández
- Date of birth: 15 February 1990 (age 36)
- Place of birth: Montevideo, Uruguay
- Height: 1.78 m (5 ft 10 in)
- Position: Midfielder

Team information
- Current team: Danubio
- Number: 19

Youth career
- 2009–2011: Nacional

Senior career*
Years	Team	Apps	(Gls)
2010–2019	Nacional	116	(11)
2013–2014	→ Deportes Iquique (loan)	35	(8)
2017	→ Rosario Central (loan)	6	(0)
2019	Fortaleza	2	(0)
2020	Rentistas	13	(1)
2020–2021	O'Higgins	38	(0)
2022	Liverpool	29	(1)
2023–	Danubio	92	(6)
- * Club domestic league appearances and goals as of 1 October 2025

Santiago Ernesto Romero Fernández (born 15 February 1990) is a Uruguayan footballer who plays for Danubio.

== Honours ==
Nacional

- Uruguayan Primera División: 2011–12, 2014–15
