= Matías Tellechea =

Uruguayan footballer

Personal information
- Full name: Matías Nicolás Tellechea Pérez
- Date of birth: 21 September 1992 (age 34)
- Place of birth: Maldonado, Uruguay
- Height: 1.80 m (5 ft 11 in)
- Position: Forward

Team information
- Current team: Atenas
- Number: 21

Youth career
- Atenas

Senior career*
Years	Team	Apps	(Gls)
2010	Atenas	12	(3)
2010–2011	River Plate Montevideo	0	(0)
2011–2012	Cerro Largo	25	(3)
2012–2013	Botafogo	0	(0)
2013	→ Luziânia (loan)	–	(–)
2013–2015	Deportivo Maldonado	30	(1)
2015	→ Cerro Largo (loan)	14	(1)
2015–2017	Cerro Largo	55	(1)
2018	Deportivo Maldonado	17	(1)
2019	Cerro Largo	27	(3)
2020	Deportivo Maldonado	29	(2)
2021	Lautaro de Buin	0	(0)
2021	Deportes Melipilla	7	(0)
2022–2023	Deportivo Maldonado	32	(0)
2024–	Atenas	4	(0)
- * Club domestic league appearances and goals as of 23 April 2024

Matías Nicolás Tellechea Pérez (born 21 September 1992) is a Uruguayan footballer who plays as a forward for Atenas de San Carlos.

== Club career ==
Born in Maldonado, Uruguay, Tellechea started his career with Atenas de San Carlos and River Plate in his homeland. In 2011, he joined Cerro Largo, with whom he reached the fourth place in the 2011–12 Uruguayan Primera División, qualifying to the 2012 Copa Sudamericana. In August 2012, he moved to Brazil, signed with Botafogo and played on loan for Luziânia in both the 2013 Copa do Brasil and the Campeonato Brasiliense.

Back in Uruguay, he joined Deportivo Maldonado in 2013, playing for them until 2014. Later, he played for them in another three stints in 2018, 2020 and 2022–23. He also took part in the 2023 Copa Libertadores against Fortaleza.

Tellechea returned to Cerro Largo in 2015 until 2017. He rejoined them in 2019.

In March 2021, he moved to Chile and joined Lautaro de Buin in the Primera B, but the club couldn't play in any division due to regulation issues, switching to Primera División side Deportes Melipilla in the second half of the same year.

In 2024, Tellechea returned to Atenas de San Carlos.

== International career ==
Tellechea was a member of the Uruguay under-20 national team preliminary squad for the 2011 South American U20 Championship.
