= Joaquín Boghossian =

Uruguayan footballer (born 1987)

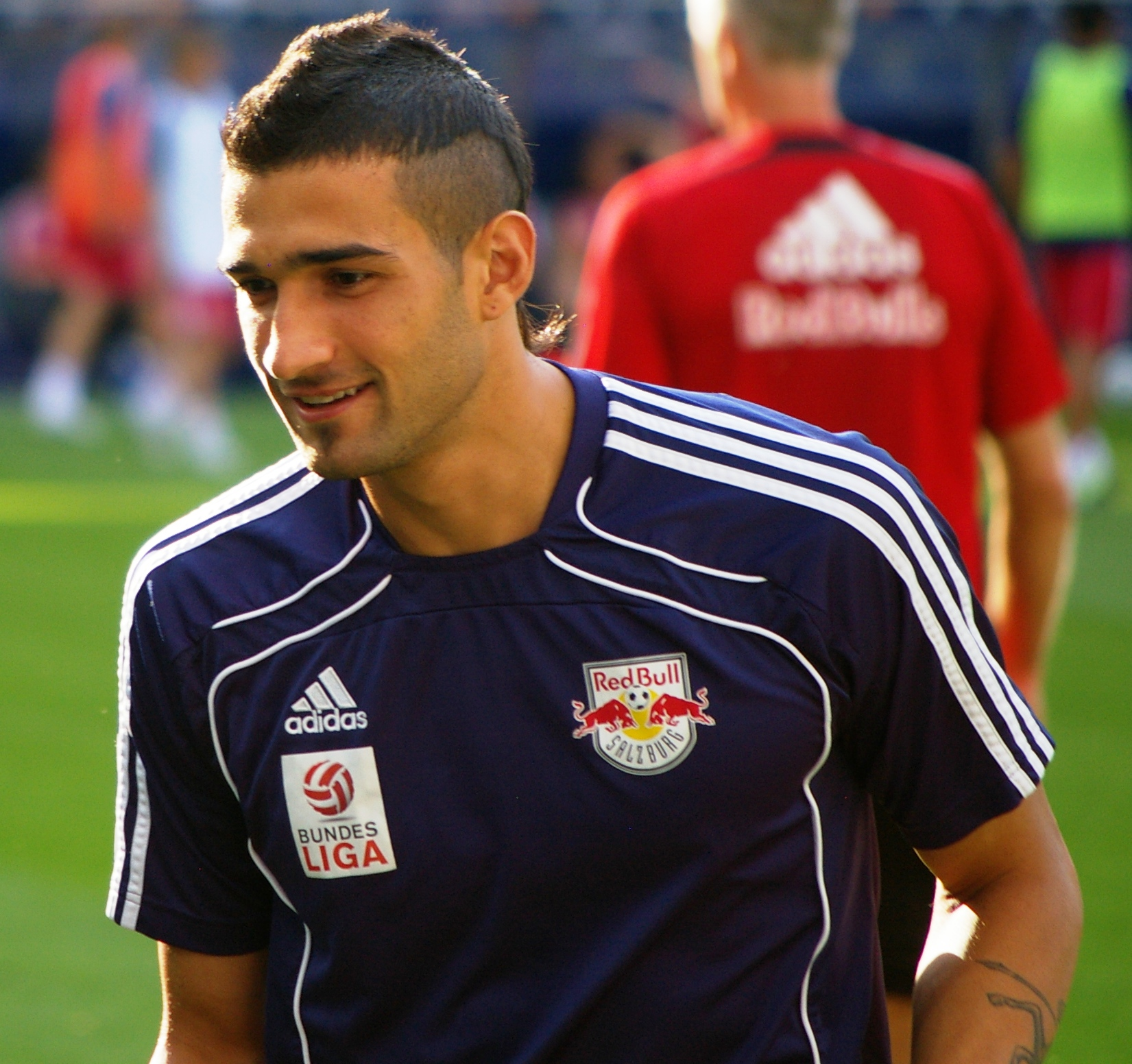
- Boghossian with Red Bull Salzburg in 2011

Personal information
- Full name: Joaquín Antonio Boghossian Lorenzo
- Date of birth: 19 June 1987 (age 39)
- Place of birth: Montevideo, Uruguay
- Height: 1.97 m (6 ft 6 in)
- Position: Forward

Senior career*
Years	Team	Apps	(Gls)
2005–2006	Cerro	25	(7)
2006–2007	Progreso	4	(0)
2007–2010	Cerro	55	(23)
2009–2010	→ Newell's Old Boys (loan)	34	(17)
2010–2013	Red Bull Salzburg	18	(1)
2011–2012	→ Nacional (loan)	14	(5)
2013	→ Cercle Brugge (loan)	6	(1)
2013–2014	Quilmes	24	(2)
2014–2015	Defensor Sporting	5	(1)
2015–2017	Cerro	23	(4)
2016–2017	→ Arsenal de Sarandí (loan)	16	(3)
2017–2018	Sarmiento	12	(0)
2018	Sport Huancayo	17	(3)
2019	Plaza Colonia	11	(1)
2019	Sud América	10	(0)
2020–2021	Cerro	17	(0)

International career
2007	Uruguay U20		

Managerial career
- 2021–2022: Central Español (assistant)
- 2022: Atenas de San Carlos (assistant)
- 2023: Uruguay Montevideo
- 2024: Deportivo Maldonado
- 2024–2025: Albion
- * Club domestic league appearances and goals

Joaquín Boghossián (born 19 June 1987) is a uruguayan football manager and former player who played as a forward.

== Early life ==
Joaquin was born in Montevideo on 19 June 1987 to an Armenian father and a Spanish mother.

== Club career ==
He began his career at Club Cerro. In 2005, he debuted in the first division and four years later, due to his great talent and goalscoring ability, he moved to Argentina. In the Uruguayan league, he scored 23 goals in 55 matches and helped "Club Cerro" to qualification in the next Copa Libertadores, becoming the top scorer.

In 2009, he joined Newell's Old Boys. In the 2009 Argentinian Apertura, he scored 11 goals in 18 matches, becoming the team's top goalscorer and one of the best strikers in the championship. Newell's fought against Banfield for the championship until the very last round, with a disappointing 0–2 home defeat to San Lorenzo in the final match.

Despite it being only his first season in Argentina, the Uruguayan striker was immensely popular with the fans. His aerial game and his excellent goalscoring record made Boghossián recognised by fans as a replacement to their last top goalscorer: Oscar "Tacuara" Cardozo.

In the summer of 2010, after his spell on loan in Newell's Old Boys, Boghossián was transferred to Red Bull Salzburg, the defending champion of the Austrian Football Bundesliga, where he signed a four-year contract. However, for the season held in Salzburg, Boghossián showed no activity, which was present at a performance in the previous club. In 18 matches, he scored only one goal. Therefore, the leadership of the club decided to send the player on rent.

Boghossián's services were interested in clubs such as Paraguayan club Club Olimpia, Uruguayan club Nacional and Greek club PAOK. Later, information from a number of Uruguayan media reported that the player will soon be joining PAOK. The club reportedly offered 350,000 euros and a one-year contract with the continuation of the wages that Boghossian received from Red Bull. The information was incorrect, however, and Boghossián was loaned to Nacional, where he was on the end of the season 2011–12. In January 2013, he was put on loan for six months to Cercle Brugge.

== International career ==
Boghossián played for Uruguay U-20 youth team in the Sudamericano of 2007. He has yet to play for the national team of Uruguay. While facing strong competition in Diego Forlán, Luis Suárez and Edinson Cavani, Boghossian could well be the next striker for Uruguay. According to him, if the head coach of Uruguay did not call him to the 2010 FIFA World Cup in South Africa, he will play for the national team of Armenia. However, it was later revealed that he had tried to sway the coach of Uruguay, and he is not going to play for Armenia.

== Honours ==
Nacional

- Uruguayan Primera División: 2011–12
