= Santiago Silva (footballer, born 1990) =

Uruguayan footballer

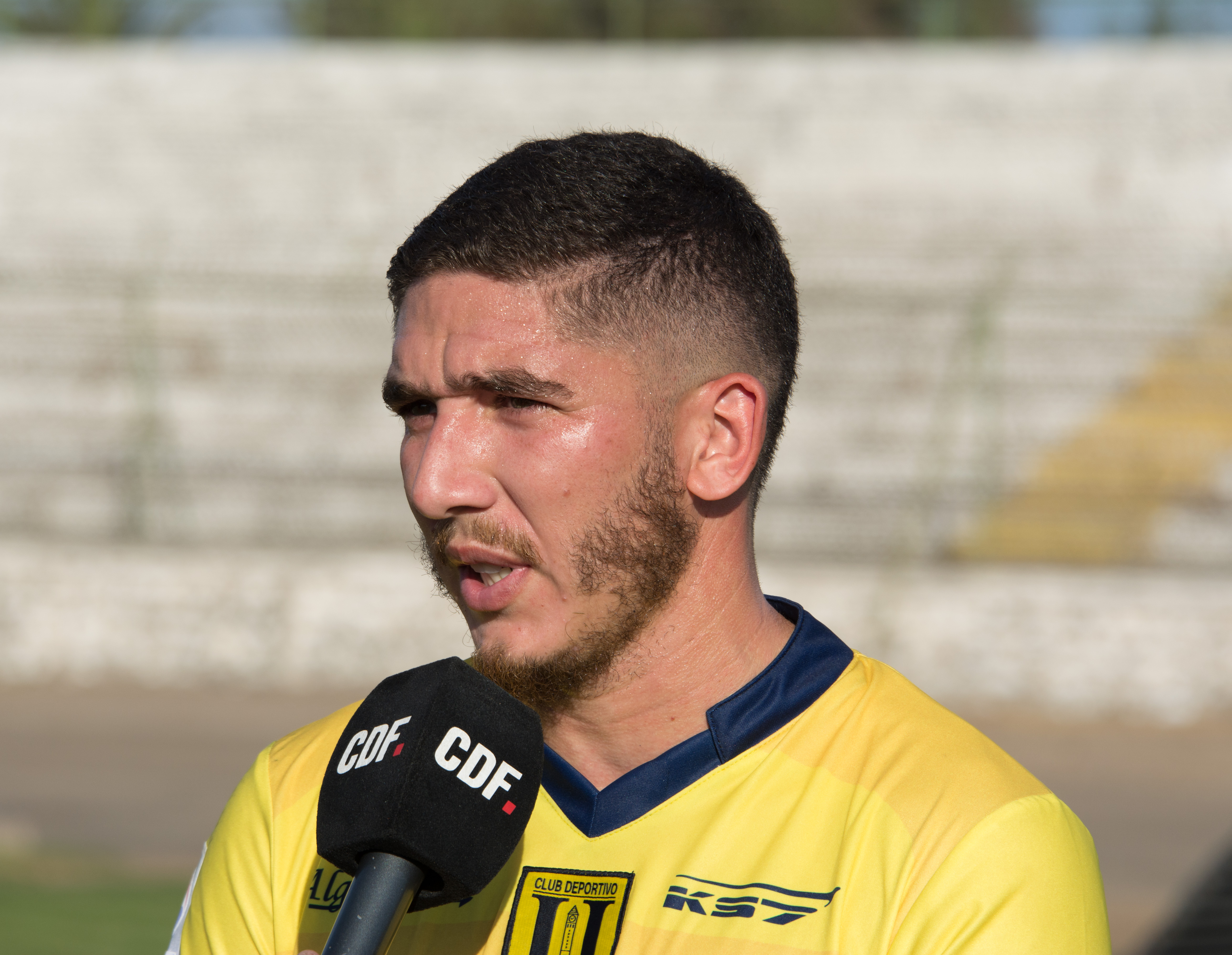
- Silva in 2018

Personal information
- Full name: Santiago Silva Gerez
- Date of birth: 26 August 1990 (age 36)
- Place of birth: Artigas, Uruguay
- Height: 1.80 m (5 ft 11 in)
- Position: Forward

Team information
- Current team: Deportivo Garcilaso
- Number: 9

Youth career
- –2010: Danubio

Senior career*
| Years | Team | Apps | (Gls) |
| 2010–2011 | Danubio | 3 | (0) |
| 2011–2015 | Peñarol | 20 | (6) |
| 2014 | → U. de San Martín (loan) | 29 | (23) |
| 2015 | Cerro | 6 | (3) |
| 2016 | Sporting Cristal | 35 | (11) |
| 2017 | América de Cali | 22 | (5) |
| 2018 | Universidad Concepción | 8 | (1) |
| 2018 | Progreso | 5 | (1) |
| 2019 | César Vallejo | 32 | (15) |
| 2020 | Atlante | 5 | (0) |
| 2021-2022 | César Vallejo | 29 | (6) |
| 2022 | → Deportivo Binacional (loan) | 16 | (2) |
| 2023- | Deportivo Garcilaso | 0 | (0) |
- * Club domestic league appearances and goals as of 20:43, 1 May 2020 (UTC)

Santiago Silva Gerez (born 26 August 1990) is a Uruguayan footballer who plays for Peruvian club Deportivo Garcilaso as a forward.

== Honours ==
=== Club ===
Peñarol

- Uruguayan Primera División (1): 2012–13

Sporting Cristal

- Primera División: Torneo Descentralizado, 2016
