= 2009–10 Club Nacional de Football season =

Nacional
2009-10 season
- Chairman: (Uruguay) Ricardo Alarcón
- Manager: (Uruguay) Eduardo Acevedo
- Primera Division: Runners-up
- Torneo Apertura: 1st (9th title)
- Torneo Clausura: 4th
- Copa Libertadores: Round of 16
- Top goalscorer: League: (Uruguay) Sergio Blanco (13 goals); All: (Uruguay) Sergio Blanco (13 goals)
- Highest home attendance: 60,000 v Peñarol (6 December 2009)
- Lowest home attendance: 15,000 v Fénix (24 April 2010)
- Average home league attendance: 25,298
| Home colours | Away colours | Third colours |

== Squad ==
Updated 2 May 2010 Note: Flags indicate national team as defined under FIFA eligibility rules; some limited exceptions apply. Players may hold more than one non-FIFA nationality.

| No. | Pos. | Nation | Player |
|---|---|---|---|
| 1 | GK | URU | Leonardo Burián |
| 2 | DF | URU | Alejandro Lembo (vice-captain) |
| 3 | DF | URU | Martín Galain |
| 4 | DF | URU | Christian Núñez |
| 5 | MF | URU | Gianni Guigou |
| 6 | DF | URU | Ernesto Goñi |
| 7 | DF | PAR | Eduardo Aranda |
| 8 | MF | URU | Mathías Cabrera |
| 9 | FW | URU | Sebastián Balsas |
| 10 | MF | ARG | Ángel Morales |
| 11 | FW | URU | Sergio Blanco |
| 12 | GK | URU | Nicola Pérez |
| 13 | MF | URU | Raúl Ferro |
| 14 | FW | URU | Mario Regueiro |
| 15 | MF | URU | Álvaro González |
| 16 | MF | URU | Gustavo Varela |
| 17 | MF | URU | Maximiliano Calzada |

| No. | Pos. | Nation | Player |
|---|---|---|---|
| 18 | DF | URU | Gonzalo Godoy |
| 19 | DF | URU | Sebastián Coates |
| 20 | FW | URU | Santiago García |
| 21 | MF | URU | Oscar Javier Morales (captain) |
| 22 | MF | URU | Mauricio Pereyra |
| 23 | FW | URU | Facundo Píriz |
| 24 | FW | URU | Diego Vera |
| 25 | GK | URU | Rodrigo Muñoz |
| — | GK | URU | Sebastián Fuentes |
| — | DF | URU | Alejandro Rodríguez |
| — | DF | URU | Alexis Rolin |
| — | MF | URU | Santiago Saúl |
| — | MF | URU | Santiago Romero |
| — | FW | URU | Álvaro Apólito |
| — | FW | URU | Bryan Machado |
| — | FW | URU | Leonardo Novo |

== Transfers ==
=== In ===
Note: Flags indicate national team as defined under FIFA eligibility rules; some limited exceptions apply. Players may hold more than one non-FIFA nationality.

| No. | Pos. | Nation | Player |
|---|---|---|---|
| 2 | DF | URU | Alejandro Lembo (from (Greece) Aris Thessaloniki) |
| 4 | DF | URU | Christian Núñez (from (Uruguay) Cerro) |
| 5 | MF | URU | Gianni Guigou (from (Italy) Treviso) |
| 6 | DF | URU | Ernesto Goñi (from (Uruguay) Racing) |
| 7 | DF | PAR | Eduardo Aranda (from (Uruguay) Liverpool) |
| 8 | MF | URU | Mathías Cabrera (from (Uruguay) Cerro) |
| 9 | FW | URU | Sebastián Balsas (from (Uruguay) Racing) |
| 13 | MF | URU | Raúl Ferro (from (Uruguay) Danubio) |

| No. | Pos. | Nation | Player |
|---|---|---|---|
| 15 | MF | URU | Álvaro González (from (Argentina) Boca Juniors) |
| 16 | MF | URU | Gustavo Varela (from (Germany) Schalke 04) |
| 17 | FW | URU | Mario Regueiro (from (Greece) Aris Thessaloniki) |
| 18 | DF | URU | Gonzalo Godoy (from (Uruguay) Cerro) |
| 23 | FW | PAR | Derlis Florentín (from (Ecuador) Barcelona) |
| 24 | FW | URU | Diego Vera (from (Uruguay) Defensor Sporting) |
| — | GK | URU | Sebastián Fuentes (from (Uruguay) Miramar Misiones) |
| — | FW | URU | Álvaro Apólito (from (Uruguay) Cerro) |

=== Out ===
Note: Flags indicate national team as defined under FIFA eligibility rules; some limited exceptions apply. Players may hold more than one non-FIFA nationality.

| No. | Pos. | Nation | Player |
|---|---|---|---|
| 3 | DF | ARG | Federico Domínguez (to (Argentina) Argentinos Juniors) |
| 3 | DF | URU | Gastón Filgueira (end contract) |
| 4 | DF | URU | Mauricio Victorino (to Universidad de Chile) |
| 5 | DF | URU | Martín Rodríguez (to (Uruguay) Liverpool) |
| 6 | DF | ARG | Matías Rodríguez (to Universidad de Chile) |
| 7 | DF | URU | Diego Rodríguez (to (Uruguay) Central Español) |
| 8 | MF | URU | Diego Arismendi (to (England) Stoke City) |
| 9 | FW | URU | Alexander Medina (to (Argentina) Arsenal) |
| 13 | FW | URU | Martín Cauteruccio (to (Uruguay) Racing) |
| 14 | MF | URU | Nicolás Lodeiro (to (Netherlands) Ajax) |
| 15 | DF | URU | Adrián Romero (to (Mexico) Querétaro) |

| No. | Pos. | Nation | Player |
|---|---|---|---|
| 16 | FW | ARG | Marcos Mondaini (to (Peru) Alianza Lima) |
| 17 | MF | URU | Roberto Brum (to (Argentina) Olimpo) |
| 18 | DF | URU | Pablo Caballero (to (Switzerland) Locarno) |
| 22 | MF | URU | Álvaro Fernández (to (Portugal) Vitória Setúbal) |
| 23 | MF | URU | Jorge Cazulo (to (Uruguay) Deportivo Maldonado) |
| 23 | FW | PAR | Derlis Florentín (to (Uruguay) Atenas) |
| 24 | FW | URU | Gustavo Biscayzacú (end contract) |
| — | DF | URU | Mathías Abero (to (Uruguay) Racing) |
| — | DF | CRC | Kendall Waston (to (Costa Rica) Saprissa) |
| — | MF | URU | Luis Oyarbide (to (Uruguay) Montevideo Wanderers) |
| — | FW | URU | Álvaro Apolito (to (Uruguay) Cerro) |

== Statistics ==
=== Appearances and goals ===
Last updated on 18 May 2010.

| No. | Pos | Nat | Player | Total | | Primera División Uruguaya | | Copa Libertadores | |
| No. | Pos | Nat | Player | Apps | Goals | Apps | Goals | Apps | Goals |
|---|---|---|---|---|---|---|---|---|---|
| 1 | GK | (Uruguay) URU | Leonardo Burián | 3 | -4 | 3+0 | -4 | 0+0 | 0 |
| 2 | DF | (Uruguay) URU | Alejandro Lembo | 31 | 2 | 24+0 | 2 | 7+0 | 0 |
| 3 | DF | (Uruguay) URU | Martín Galain | 4 | 0 | 3+1 | 0 | 0+0 | 0 |
| 4 | DF | (Uruguay) URU | Christian Núñez | 32 | 0 | 21+4 | 0 | 5+2 | 0 |
| 5 | MF | (Uruguay) URU | Gianni Guigou | 15 | 1 | 8+6 | 1 | 0+1 | 0 |
| 6 | DF | (Uruguay) URU | Ernesto Goñi | 18 | 1 | 13+0 | 1 | 5+0 | 0 |
| 7 | DF | (Paraguay) PAR | Eduardo Aranda | 10 | 1 | 10+0 | 1 | 0+0 | 0 |
| 8 | MF | (Uruguay) URU | Mathías Cabrera | 19 | 1 | 10+8 | 1 | 1+0 | 0 |
| 9 | FW | (Uruguay) URU | Sebastián Balsas | 20 | 5 | 9+8 | 5 | 0+3 | 0 |
| 10 | MF | (Argentina) ARG | Ángel Morales | 33 | 3 | 26+1 | 2 | 6+0 | 1 |
| 11 | FW | (Uruguay) URU | Sergio Blanco | 30 | 13 | 14+11 | 13 | 1+4 | 0 |
| 13 | MF | (Uruguay) URU | Raúl Ferro | 32 | 1 | 22+3 | 1 | 7+0 | 0 |
| 14 | FW | (Uruguay) URU | Mario Regueiro | 30 | 11 | 19+3 | 6 | 8+0 | 5 |
| 15 | MF | (Uruguay) URU | Álvaro González | 37 | 3 | 22+7 | 3 | 8+0 | 0 |
| 16 | MF | (Uruguay) URU | Gustavo Varela | 31 | 10 | 16+7 | 9 | 8+0 | 1 |
| 17 | MF | (Uruguay) URU | Maximiliano Calzada | 20 | 0 | 5+8 | 0 | 5+2 | 0 |
| 18 | DF | (Uruguay) URU | Gonzalo Godoy | 13 | 1 | 8+1 | 0 | 1+3 | 1 |
| 19 | DF | (Uruguay) URU | Sebastián Coates | 32 | 3 | 24+0 | 2 | 8+0 | 1 |
| 20 | FW | (Uruguay) URU | Santiago García | 21 | 6 | 12+7 | 6 | 1+1 | 0 |
| 21 | MF | (Uruguay) URU | Oscar Javier Morales | 34 | 1 | 27+0 | 1 | 7+0 | 0 |
| 22 | MF | (Uruguay) URU | Mauricio Pereyra | 26 | 2 | 11+8 | 1 | 2+5 | 1 |
| 23 | MF | (Uruguay) URU | Facundo Píriz | 1 | 0 | 1+0 | 0 | 0+0 | 0 |
| 24 | FW | (Uruguay) URU | Diego Vera | 14 | 2 | 3+8 | 2 | 0+3 | 0 |
| 25 | GK | (Uruguay) URU | Rodrigo Muñoz | 38 | -33 | 30+0 | -23 | 8+0 | -10 |
| — | DF | (Uruguay) URU | Gastón Filgueira* | 1 | 0 | 1+0 | 0 | 0+0 | 0 |
| — | DF | (Argentina) ARG | Matías Rodríguez* | 13 | 2 | 13+0 | 2 | 0+0 | 0 |
| — | MF | (Uruguay) URU | Nicolás Lodeiro* | 9 | 7 | 9+0 | 7 | 0+0 | 0 |
| — | MF | (Uruguay) URU | Santiago Romero | 1 | 0 | 0+1 | 0 | 0+0 | 0 |
| — | FW | (Paraguay) PAR | Derlis Florentín* | 2 | 0 | 0+2 | 0 | 0+0 | 0 |
| — | FW | (Uruguay) URU | Bryan Machado | 1 | 0 | 0+1 | 0 | 0+0 | 0 |

Note

- * = Players who left the club mid-season

=== Top scorers ===
Includes all competitive matches

| Position | Nation | Number | Name | Primera División Uruguaya | Copa Libertadores | Total |
|---|---|---|---|---|---|---|
| 1 | (Uruguay) | 11 | Sergio Blanco | 13 | 0 | 13 |
| 2 | (Uruguay) | 14 | Mario Regueiro | 6 | 5 | 11 |
| 3 | (Uruguay) | 16 | Gustavo Varela | 9 | 1 | 10 |
| 4 | (Uruguay) | — | Nicolás Lodeiro* | 7 | 0 | 7 |
| 5 | (Uruguay) | 20 | Santiago García | 6 | 0 | 6 |
| 6 | (Uruguay) | 9 | Sebastián Balsas | 5 | 0 | 5 |
| 7 | (Argentina) | 10 | Ángel Morales | 2 | 1 | 3 |
| = | (Uruguay) | 15 | Álvaro González | 3 | 0 | 3 |
| = | (Uruguay) | 19 | Sebastián Coates | 2 | 1 | 3 |
| 10 | (Uruguay) | 2 | Alejandro Lembo | 2 | 0 | 2 |
| = | (Uruguay) | 22 | Mauricio Pereyra | 1 | 1 | 2 |
| = | (Uruguay) | 24 | Diego Vera | 2 | 0 | 2 |
| = | (Argentina) | — | Matías Rodríguez* | 2 | 0 | 2 |
| 14 | (Uruguay) | 5 | Gianni Guigou | 1 | 0 | 1 |
| = | (Uruguay) | 6 | Ernesto Goñi | 1 | 0 | 1 |
| = | (Paraguay) | 7 | Eduardo Aranda | 1 | 0 | 1 |
| = | (Uruguay) | 13 | Raúl Ferro | 1 | 0 | 1 |
| = | (Uruguay) | 18 | Gonzalo Godoy | 1 | 0 | 1 |
| = | (Uruguay) | 21 | Oscar Javier Morales | 1 | 0 | 1 |
| = | (Uruguay) | 23 | Mathías Cabrera | 1 | 0 | 1 |
| | | | **Own Goals** | 0 | 0 | 0 |
| | | | **Total** | **66** | **10** | 76 |

Note

- * = Players who left the club mid-season

=== Disciplinary record ===
| **Position** | **Nation** | **Number** | **Name** | **Primera División Uruguaya** | | **Copa Libertadores** | | Total | |
| **Position** | **Nation** | **Number** | **Name** | Booked | Sent off (straight red) | Booked | Sent off (straight red) | Booked | Sent off (straight red) |
| DF | (Uruguay) | 2 | Alejandro Lembo | 9 | 0 | 4 | 0 | 13 | 0 |
| DF | (Uruguay) | 3 | Martín Galain | 1 | 0 | 0 | 0 | 1 | 0 |
| DF | (Uruguay) | 4 | Christian Núñez | 8 | 1 | 1 | 0 | 9 | 1 |
| MF | (Uruguay) | 5 | Gianni Guigou | 2 | 0 | 0 | 0 | 2 | 0 |
| DF | (Uruguay) | 6 | Ernesto Goñi | 1 | 0 | 1 | 0 | 2 | 0 |
| DF | (Paraguay) | 7 | Eduardo Aranda | 1 | 0 | 0 | 0 | 1 | 0 |
| MF | (Uruguay) | 8 | Mathías Cabrera | 4 | 0 | 1 | 0 | 4 | 1 |
| FW | (Uruguay) | 9 | Sebastián Balsas | 2 | 0 | 1 | 0 | 3 | 0 |
| MF | (Argentina) | 10 | Ángel Morales | 6 | 0 | 0 | 0 | 6 | 0 |
| FW | (Uruguay) | 11 | Sergio Blanco | 4 | 2 | 0 | 0 | 4 | 2 |
| MF | (Uruguay) | 13 | Raúl Ferro | 8 | 0 | 4 | 0 | 12 | 0 |
| FW | (Uruguay) | 14 | Mario Regueiro | 11 | 2 | 1 | 0 | 12 | 2 |
| MF | (Uruguay) | 15 | Álvaro González | 2 | 0 | 2 | 0 | 4 | 0 |
| MF | (Uruguay) | 16 | Gustavo Varela | 10 | 0 | 1 | 1 | 10 | 1 |
| MF | (Uruguay) | 17 | Maximiliano Calzada | 1 | 1 | 2 | 0 | 3 | 1 |
| DF | (Uruguay) | 18 | Gonzalo Godoy | 1 | 0 | 1 | 0 | 2 | 0 |
| DF | (Uruguay) | 19 | Sebastián Coates | 7 | 0 | 4 | 1 | 11 | 1 |
| FW | (Uruguay) | 20 | Santiago García | 4 | 0 | 0 | 0 | 4 | 0 |
| MF | (Uruguay) | 21 | Oscar Javier Morales | 9 | 1 | 1 | 1 | 10 | 2 |
| MF | (Uruguay) | 22 | Mauricio Pereyra | 4 | 0 | 1 | 0 | 5 | 0 |
| MF | (Uruguay) | 23 | Facundo Píriz | 1 | 0 | 0 | 0 | 1 | 0 |
| FW | (Uruguay) | 24 | Diego Vera | 2 | 0 | 0 | 0 | 2 | 0 |
| GK | (Uruguay) | 25 | Rodrigo Muñoz | 2 | 0 | 1 | 0 | 3 | 0 |
| DF | (Uruguay) | — | Gastón Filgueira* | 1 | 1 | 0 | 0 | 1 | 1 |
| DF | (Argentina) | — | Matías Rodríguez* | 4 | 1 | 0 | 0 | 4 | 1 |
| MF | (Uruguay) | — | Nicolás Lodeiro* | 1 | 0 | 0 | 0 | 1 | 0 |
| | | | **Total** | **105** | **10** | **25** | **3** | 130 | 13 |

Note

- * = Players who left the club mid-season

=== Captains ===
| No. | Pos. | Name | Starts |
|---|---|---|---|
| 21 | MF | (Uruguay) Oscar Javier Morales | 34 |
| 2 | DF | (Uruguay) Alejandro Lembo | 4 |
| 11 | FW | (Uruguay) Sergio Blanco | 2 |
| 16 | MF | (Uruguay) Gustavo Varela | 1 |

=== Penalties Awarded ===
| Date | Success? | Penalty Taker | Opponent | Competition |
|---|---|---|---|---|
| 2009-10-03 | ✓ | (Uruguay) Sebastián Balsas | Racing | Primera División |
| 2009-10-28 | ✓ | (Uruguay) Santiago García | Central Español | Primera División |
| 2009-11-01 | ✗ | (Uruguay) Santiago García | Cerro | Primera División |
| 2009-12-13 | ✓ | (Uruguay) Nicolás Lodeiro | Cerrito | Primera División |
| 2010-02-24 | ✓ | (Argentina) Ángel Morales | Deportivo Cuenca | Copa Libertadores |
| 2010-03-06 | ✓ | (Uruguay) Gustavo Varela | Montevideo Wanderers | Primera División |
| 2010-03-13 | ✓ | (Uruguay) Sergio Blanco | Atenas | Primera División |
| 2010-03-13 | ✓ | (Uruguay) Sergio Blanco | Atenas | Primera División |
| 2010-03-21 | ✗ | (Uruguay) Rodrigo Muñoz | Central Español | Primera División |
| 2010-04-07 | ✗ | (Uruguay) Gustavo Varela | Deportivo Cuenca | Copa Libertadores |
| 2010-05-02 | ✓ | (Uruguay) Sergio Blanco | Cerrito | Primera División |
| 2010-05-02 | ✓ | (Uruguay) Gianni Guigou | Cerrito | Primera División |

=== International players ===
The following is a list of all squad members who have played for their national sides during the 2009–10 season. Players in bold were in the starting XI for their national side.

26 September 2009

| Name | | Opponents | Mins. | Goals |
|---|---|---|---|---|
| (Uruguay) URU U-20 | **Sebastián Coates** | England U-20 | 90 | 0 |
| (Uruguay) URU U-20 | **Nicolás Lodeiro** | England U-20 | 90 | 0 |
| (Uruguay) URU U-20 | **Mauricio Pereyra** | England U-20 | 90 | 0 |
| (Uruguay) URU U-20 | **Santiago García** | England U-20 | 59 | 0 |
| (Uruguay) URU U-20 | Maximiliano Calzada | England U-20 | 4 | 0 |

29 January 2009

| Name | | Opponents | Mins. | Goals |
|---|---|---|---|---|
| (Uruguay) URU U-20 | **Sebastián Coates** | Uzbekistan U-20 | 90 | 0 |
| (Uruguay) URU U-20 | **Nicolás Lodeiro** | Uzbekistan U-20 | 60 | 1 |
| (Uruguay) URU U-20 | **Mauricio Pereyra** | Uzbekistan U-20 | 45 | 0 |
| (Uruguay) URU U-20 | **Santiago García** | Uzbekistan U-20 | 90 | 1 |

2 October 2009

| Name | | Opponents | Mins. | Goals |
|---|---|---|---|---|
| (Uruguay) URU U-20 | **Sebastián Coates** | Ghana U-20 | 90 | 0 |
| (Uruguay) URU U-20 | **Nicolás Lodeiro** | Ghana U-20 | 90 | 1 |
| (Uruguay) URU U-20 | **Mauricio Pereyra** | Ghana U-20 | 60 | 0 |
| (Uruguay) URU U-20 | **Maximiliano Calzada** | Ghana U-20 | 43 | 0 |

7 October 2009

| Name | | Opponents | Mins. | Goals |
|---|---|---|---|---|
| (Uruguay) URU U-20 | **Sebastián Coates** | Brazil U-20 | 90 | 0 |
| (Uruguay) URU U-20 | **Nicolás Lodeiro** | Brazil U-20 | 90 | 0 |
| (Uruguay) URU U-20 | **Mauricio Pereyra** | Brazil U-20 | 61 | 0 |
| (Uruguay) URU U-20 | **Maximiliano Calzada** | Brazil U-20 | 45 | 0 |
| (Uruguay) URU U-20 | Santiago García | Brazil U-20 | 29 | 0 |

15 November 2009

| Name | | Opponents | Mins. | Goals |
|---|---|---|---|---|
| URU | **Álvaro González** | Costa Rica | 90 | 0 |
| URU | **Nicolás Lodeiro** | Costa Rica | 60 | 0 |

18 November 2009

| Name | | Opponents | Mins. | Goals |
|---|---|---|---|---|
| URU | **Nicolás Lodeiro** | Costa Rica | 83 | 0 |

=== Starting 11 ===
| No. | Pos. | Nat. | Name | MS | Notes |
|---|---|---|---|---|---|
| 25 | GK | (Uruguay) | Muñoz | 38 | Burián has three starts |
| 4 | RB | (Uruguay) | Núñez | 26 | Aranda has ten starts |
| 2 | CB | (Uruguay) | Lembo | 32 | Galaín has three starts |
| 19 | CB | (Uruguay) | Coates | 32 | Godoy has ten starts |
| 6 | LB | (Uruguay) | Goñi | 18 | |
| 21 | DM | (Uruguay) | O. Morales | 34 | Guigou has eight starts |
| 13 | RW | (Uruguay) | Ferro | 28 | Calzada has ten starts Píriz has one start |
| 16 | LW | (Uruguay) | González | 29 | |
| 10 | AM | (Argentina) | A. Morales | 32 | Cabrera has eleven starts Pereyra has thirteen starts |
| 16 | FW | (Uruguay) | Varela | 24 | García has twelve starts Blanco has fourteen starts |
| 14 | FW | (Uruguay) | Regueiro | 27 | Vera has ten starts Balsas has nine starts |

Last updated: 18 May 2010
Source: Squad stats and Start formations.
Only competitive matches.
Using the most used start formation.
Ordered by position on pitch (from back right to front left).

=== Overall ===
| Games played | 41 (33 Primera División Uruguaya, 8 Copa Libertadores) |
| Games won | 25 (22 Primera División Uruguaya, 3 Copa Libertadores) |
| Games drawn | 7 (4 Primera División Uruguaya, 3 Copa Libertadores) |
| Games lost | 9 (7 Primera División Uruguaya, 2 Copa Libertadores) |
| Goals scored | 76 |
| Goals conceded | 38 |
| Goal difference | +38 |
| Yellow cards | 130 |
| Red cards | 13 |
| Worst discipline | (Uruguay) Mario Regueiro (12 (yellow card) , 2 (red card) ) |
| Best result | 6-0 (A) v Atenas – Primera División Uruguaya 2010.03.13 |
| Worst result | 0-4 (A) v Montevideo Wanderers – Primera División Uruguaya 2009.10.17 |
| Most appearances | (Uruguay) Rodrigo Muñoz (38 appearances) |
| Top scorer | (Uruguay) Sergio Blanco (13 goals) |

Last updated: 18 May
Source: Nacional

== Club ==
=== Coaching staff ===
| Position | Staff |
|---|---|
| Manager | (Uruguay) Eduardo Acevedo |
| Assistant manager | (Uruguay) Alejandro Acevedo |
| Second assistant manager | (Uruguay) Willians Lemus |
| Goalkeeping coach | (Uruguay) Tabaré Alonso |
| Team fitness coach | (Uruguay) Eduardo Arismendi (Uruguay) Fernando Cal |
| Club doctor | (Uruguay) Carlos Suero |
| First-team collaborator | (Uruguay) Ruben Sosa |

Last updated: 7 October 2009
Source: Nacional

=== Other information ===
| Chairman | (Uruguay) Ricardo Alarcón |
| Sports Manager | (Uruguay) Daniel Henríquez |
| Ground (capacity and dimensions) | Estadio Gran Parque Central (25,000 / 105x70 meters) |

Updated to match played 7 April 2010
Source: Nacional

== Team Kit ==
Supplier: Umbro
Sponsor(s): Ancel
Macri Sport Center

| Home | Away | Third kit |

== Friendlies ==
2009-08-13
15:00 (UTC-3)

| Juventud (Uruguay) | 0–7 | (Uruguay) Nacional |
|---|---|---|
| | Report | Medina 4', 37'; Blanco 12' (pen.); Guigou 25'; Arismendi 41'; Abero 63'; Núñez 85' |

Estadio Profesor Alberto Suppici, Colonia
Attendance: 0

2009-08-17
15:30 (UTC-3)

| Nacional (Uruguay) | 4–0 | (Uruguay) Mutual de Colonia |
|---|---|---|
| Blanco 5', 13'; Balsas 54'; Cabrera 86' | Report |

Los Céspedes, Montevideo
Attendance: 0

2009-09-05
11:00 (UTC-3)

| Nacional (Uruguay) | 3–0 | (Uruguay) Cerro Largo |
|---|---|---|
| Regueiro 31'; Vera 56'; Varela 82' | Report |

Estadio Gran Parque Central, Montevideo
Attendance: 3,000

2009-11-11
10:30 (UTC-3)

| Nacional (Uruguay) | 3–1 | (Uruguay) Miramar Misiones |
|---|---|---|
| García 25'; Vera 47', 68' | Report | Larrosa 81' |

Estadio Gran Parque Central, Montevideo
Attendance: 0

2009-11-14
10:00 (UTC-3)

| Nacional (Uruguay) | 4–2 | (Uruguay) Osvaldo Cannobio's team |
|---|---|---|
| Núñez 14'; García 27' (pen.); Balsas 67'; Vera 78' | Report | Alvez 34', 41' |

Estadio Gran Parque Central, Montevideo
Attendance: 0

2009-11-26
10:00 (UTC-3)

| Nacional (Uruguay) | 7–0 | (Uruguay) Florida |
|---|---|---|
| Blanco 27'; Regueiro 41'; Muñoz 61' (pen.); Varela 67'; Florentín 74'; A. Morales 78'; Balsas 86' | Report |

Estadio Gran Parque Central, Montevideo
Attendance: 0

2009-11-28
15:00 (UTC-3)

| Nacional (Uruguay) | 3–2 | (Uruguay) Miramar Misiones |
|---|---|---|
| Regueiro 25', 41'; García 71' | Report | Larrosa 61', 90+1' |

Estadio Gran Parque Central, Montevideo
Attendance: 0

2010-01-09
18:00 (UTC-3)

| Maldonado (Uruguay) | 0–4 | (Uruguay) Nacional |
|---|---|---|
| | Report | García 35'; Lodeiro 54'; Varela 66'; Vera 85' |

Posta del Lago, Punta del Este
Attendance: 0

=== Copa Amistad ===
2009-10-08
20:00 (UTC-3)

| Ferro Carril (Uruguay) | 1–3 | (Uruguay) Nacional |
|---|---|---|
| N. Cabrera 86' | Report | Blanco 5', 29' (pen.); Balsas 18' |

Estadio Roberto Dickinson, Salto
Attendance: 5,000

=== Copa Bimbo ===
==== Semi-finals ====
2010-01-15
22:00 (UTC-3)

| Nacional (Uruguay) | 0–0 | (Uruguay) Peñarol |
|---|---|---|
| O. Morales (yellow card) 13'; Varela (yellow card) 15'; Lembo (yellow card) 50'; Balsas (red card) 73' | Report | Pacheco (yellow card) 28'; Ramírez (yellow card) 39'; Orteman (yellow card) 42'; Aguirregaray (red card) 73' |
Penalties
| Guigou (penalty scored); A. Morales (penalty scored); Varela (penalty scored); Vera (penalty missed); Lembo (penalty scored); Muñoz (penalty scored); O. Morales (penalty scored) | 6–5 | (penalty scored) Orteman; (penalty missed) Ramírez; (penalty scored) Ramis; (penalty scored) Albín; (penalty scored) Olivera; (penalty scored) Urretavizcaya; (penalty missed) Alejandro González |

Estadio Centenario, Montevideo
Attendance: 40,000
Referee: Jorge Larrionda (Uruguay)

==== Final ====
2010-01-18
22:10 (UTC-3)

| Danubio (Uruguay) | 1–1 | (Uruguay) Nacional |
|---|---|---|
| Perrone 78'; Silva (yellow card) 86' | Report | Núñez (yellow card) 77'; Blanco 90+1' |
Penalties
| Perrone (penalty missed); Mena (penalty missed); Ifrán (penalty scored); Miguez (penalty missed) | 1–3 | (penalty scored) Varela; (penalty scored) A. Morales; (penalty missed) A. González; (penalty scored) Ferro |

Estadio Centenario, Montevideo
Attendance: 25,000
Referee: Darío Ubriaco (Uruguay)

== Primera División Uruguaya ==
=== Apertura's table ===
| Pos | Team | Pld | W | D | L | GF | GA | GD | Pts | Qualification |
|---|---|---|---|---|---|---|---|---|---|---|
| 1 | Nacional | 15 | 13 | 0 | 2 | 36 | 11 | +25 | 36 (Note: Nacional was docked three points.) | Championship Playoffs |
| 2 | Liverpool | 15 | 8 | 5 | 2 | 31 | 14 | +17 | 29 | |
| 3 | Defensor Sporting | 15 | 8 | 5 | 2 | 28 | 16 | +12 | 29 | |
| 4 | Montevideo Wanderers | 15 | 7 | 5 | 3 | 24 | 13 | +11 | 26 | |
| 5 | Peñarol | 15 | 7 | 5 | 3 | 28 | 19 | +9 | 26 | |

Updated to match(es) played on December 13, 2009. Source: AUF
Rules for classification: 1st points; 2nd goal difference; 3rd goals scored; 4th head-to-head results; 5th draw
Notes:
- The apertura's winner qualifies for the semifinal of the Primera División.

==== Matches ====
2009-08-22
15:30 (UTC-3)

| Cerro Largo | 0–1 | Nacional |
|---|---|---|
| Rivero (yellow card) 37'; Y. Rodríguez (yellow card) 40' | Report | Muñoz (yellow card) 39'; Blanco 45'; Matías Rodríguez (yellow card) 54'; Cabrera (yellow card) 82' |

Estadio Centenario, Montevideo
Attendance: 7,000
Referee: Rafael Orfila

2009-08-29
15:00 (UTC-3)

| Nacional | 1–0 | Tacuarembó |
|---|---|---|
| A. Morales (yellow card) 53'; Núñez (yellow card) 65'; O. Morales (yellow card) 70'; Matías Rodríguez (yellow card) 78'; Vera (yellow card) 88' (goal) 90+9' | Report | Martínez (yellow card) 22'; Sosa (yellow card) 62'; Dutra (yellow card) 63'; Silva (yellow card) 70'; A. García (red card) 90+3' |

Estadio Gran Parque Central, Montevideo
Attendance: 20,000
Referee: Carlos Aguirregaray

2009-09-13
15:30 (UTC-3)

| Defensor Sporting | 0–3 | Nacional |
|---|---|---|
| de Souza (yellow card) 26'; Martínez (yellow card) 44'; M. Risso (yellow card) 58' | Report | O. Morales (yellow card) 30'; Núñez (yellow card) 41'; Cabrera (yellow card) 48' (goal) 60'; A. Morales 58'; Regueiro 74' |

Estadio Centenario, Montevideo
Attendance: 25,000
Referee: Martín Vázquez

2009-09-20
16:00 (UTC-3)

| Nacional | 2–1 | Liverpool |
|---|---|---|
| Aranda (yellow card) 39'; Matías Rodríguez 73'; Lembo 86' | Report | Castro (yellow card) 37'; Medina (yellow card) 57'; Alfaro 66' (yellow card) 90+1'; Macchi (yellow card) 76'; Rodales (yellow card) 83'; Alvez (yellow card) 85' |

Estadio Gran Parque Central, Montevideo
Attendance: 21,000
Referee: Roberto Silvera

2009-09-26
19:30 (UTC-3)

| River Plate | 1–0 | Nacional |
|---|---|---|
| Zambrana 23' (pen.); Klingender (yellow card) 41' (yellow-red card) 49'; Porta (yellow card) 42'; J. Rodríguez (yellow card) 82' (yellow-red card) 90+4' | Report | Regueiro (yellow card) 23' (yellow-red card) 28'; Matías Rodríguez (yellow card) 48' (yellow-red card) 80'; Guigou (yellow card) 51'; A. Morales (yellow card) 74'; Núñez (red card) 85' |

Estadio Centenario, Montevideo
Attendance: 27,000
Referee: Luis Larrañaga

2009-10-03
16:30 (UTC-3)

| Nacional | 3–2 | Racing |
|---|---|---|
| Núñez (yellow card) 29'; Guigou (yellow card) 29'; O. Morales (yellow card) 41'; Balsas 45+3' (pen.), 49' (yellow card) 76'; Ferro 79'; Blanco (yellow card) 85' | Report | Cauteruccio 8'; Quiñones 14' (yellow card) 45+1'; Hernández (yellow card) 19'; Barrientos (yellow card) 51'; Ostolaza (yellow card) 78' |

Estadio Gran Parque Central, Montevideo
Attendance: 21,000
Referee: Héctor Martínez

2009-10-17
16:30 (UTC-3)

| Montevideo Wanderers | 4–0 | Nacional |
|---|---|---|
| Tellechea 43'; Videla 49'; Lacerda 55' (pen.); Charquero (yellow card) 74'; Vanderhoeght 76' | Report | Cabrera (yellow card) 15'; Blanco (red card) 27'; A. Morales (yellow card) 33'; Lembo (yellow card) 42'; Matías Rodríguez (yellow card) 53'; O. Morales (red card) 65'; Vera (yellow card) 82' |

Estadio Centenario, Montevideo
Attendance: 16,000
Referee: Fredy De Seja

2009-10-21
21:30 (UTC-3)

| Nacional | 5–0 | Atenas |
|---|---|---|
| Blanco 8'; Lodeiro 19', 77'; Matías Rodríguez 43'; González 55'; Varela (yellow card) 65'; Coates (yellow card) 85' | Report | Galán (yellow card) 22'; Trinidad (yellow card) 63' |

Estadio Gran Parque Central, Montevideo
Attendance: 16,000
Referee: Oscar Rojas

2009-10-28
20:10 (UTC-3)

| Nacional | 5–1 | Central Español |
|---|---|---|
| Aranda 56'; García 66' (pen.); Lodeiro 71' (yellow card) 71'; Blanco 72'; Varela 82' | Report | Usucar (yellow card) 18'; Espiga 49' (red card) 84'; Firpo (yellow card) 54'; Tejera (red card) 65' |

Estadio Gran Parque Central, Montevideo
Attendance: 19,000
Referee: Fernando Cabrera

2009-11-01
17:00 (UTC-3)

| Nacional | 2–0 | Cerro |
|---|---|---|
| Lodeiro 7'; Blanco (yellow card) 19'; Ferro (yellow card) 35'; Lembo (yellow card) 51'; Varela 90+3' | Report | Caballero (yellow card) 14'; Suffo (yellow card) 31'; Ravecca (yellow card) 50'; Melo (yellow card) 69'; Trujillo (yellow card) 79'; Leites (yellow card) 84' (yellow-red card) 90+1'; Lombardi (yellow card) 86' |

Estadio Gran Parque Central, Montevideo
Attendance: 21,000
Referee: Gustavo Siegler

2009-11-07
17:00 (UTC-3)

| Nacional | 3–0 | Rampla Juniors |
|---|---|---|
| O. Morales 23'; Ferro (yellow card) 30'; Coates 32', 73'; Núñez (yellow card) 79' | Report | Bonjour (yellow card) 14'; Requelme (yellow card) 27'; Broli (yellow card) 74'; Novick (yellow card) 75'; Delgado (yellow card) 82'; Melonio (yellow card) 85' |

Estadio Gran Parque Central, Montevideo
Attendance: 20,000
Referee: Daniel Fedorczuk

2009-11-22
17:00 (UTC-3)

| Danubio | 0–2 | Nacional |
|---|---|---|
| R. Rodríguez (yellow card) 22'; S. Rodríguez (yellow card) 38'; Pumar (yellow card) 44'; Silva (yellow card) 60' | Report | González (yellow card) 24'; Varela (yellow card) 24' (goal) 28'; A. Morales (yellow card) 72'; Vera 85' |

Jardines del Hipódromo, Montevideo
Attendance: 4,500
Referee: Roberto Silvera

2009-12-06
17:00 (UTC-3)

| Nacional | 3–0 | Peñarol |
|---|---|---|
| Regueiro 2' (yellow card) 53'; Lodeiro 29'; García (yellow card) 44' (goal) 80'; Coates (yellow card) 47' | Report | de los Santos (yellow card) 26'; Alcoba (yellow card) 32'; Aguirregaray (yellow card) 32'; Ramis (yellow card) 79'; Olivera (red card) 88' |

Estadio Centenario, Montevideo
Attendance: 60,000
Referee: Darío Ubríaco

2009-12-10
21:00 (UTC-3)

| Fénix | 0–1 | Nacional |
|---|---|---|
| Gerardo Varela (yellow card) 3'; Quiroga (red card) 60' | Report | González 55'; Coates (yellow card) 82' |

Estadio Centenario, Montevideo
Attendance: 40,000
Referee: Jorge Larrañaga

2009-12-13
17:00 (UTC-3)

| Cerrito | 2–5 | Nacional |
|---|---|---|
| Franco 4', 90'; Alcoba (yellow card) 30'; Planchón (yellow card) 54'; Bruzzone (yellow card) 63'; L. Cabrera (yellow card) 72' | Report | A. Morales 5' (yellow card) 35'; Lodeiro 12' (pen.), 32'; Regueiro (yellow card) 16'; Filgueira (yellow card) 36' (yellow-red card) 56'; Lembo (yellow card) 50'; Varela 54'; Blanco 83' |

Estadio Centenario, Montevideo
Attendance: 7,000
Referee: Gustavo Siegler

=== Clausura's table ===
| Pos | Team | Pld | W | D | L | GF | GA | GD | Pts |
|---|---|---|---|---|---|---|---|---|---|
| 2 | Cerro | 15 | 9 | 2 | 4 | 28 | 18 | +10 | 29 |
| 3 | Fénix | 15 | 8 | 5 | 2 | 21 | 11 | +10 | 29 |
| 4 | Nacional | 15 | 8 | 3 | 4 | 27 | 15 | +12 | 27 |
| 5 | River Plate | 15 | 6 | 5 | 4 | 31 | 19 | +12 | 23 |
| 6 | Central Español | 15 | 6 | 4 | 5 | 24 | 20 | +4 | 22 |

Updated to match(es) played on 2 May 2010. Source: AUF (in Spanish)
Rules for classification: 1st points; 2nd goal difference; 3rd goals scored; 4th head-to-head results; 5th draw
- The Clausura winner qualifies for the semifinal of the Primera División.

==== Matches ====
2010-01-23
19:00 (UTC-3)

| Nacional | 3–1 | Cerro Largo |
|---|---|---|
| Regueiro 22'; Varela 25'; Lembo (yellow card) 45'; Ferro (yellow card) 51'; Blanco 75' | Report | Olivera 42'; Ruíz (yellow card) 45' |

Estadio Gran Parque Central, Montevideo
Attendance: 19,000
Referee: Rafael Orfila

2010-01-29
21:00 (UTC-3)

| Tacuarembó | 1–1 | Nacional |
|---|---|---|
| Ramírez 1'; Da Silva (yellow card) 51'; G. Píriz (yellow card) 60'; Vinicius (yellow card) 68' | Report | A. Morales (yellow card) 19'; Regueiro (yellow card) 32' (goal) 59'; O. Morales (yellow card) 43'; Coates (yellow card) 72'; Lembo (yellow card) 79'; Varela (yellow card) 89' |

Estadio Centenario, Montevideo
Attendance: 15,000
Referee: Fernando Falce

2010-02-06
19:00 (UTC-3)

| Nacional | 0–1 | Defensor Sporting |
|---|---|---|
| Ferro (yellow card) 30'; Coates (yellow card) 32'; O. Morales (yellow card) 42'; Pereyra (yellow card) 53'; Balsas (yellow card) 54'; Regueiro (yellow card) 58' | Report | de Souza 3' (yellow card) 49'; Ariosa (yellow card) 28'; Taborda (yellow card) 36'; Silva (yellow card) 50' |

Estadio Gran Parque Central, Montevideo
Attendance: 21,000
Referee: Héctor Martínez

2010-02-14
19:00 (UTC-3)

| Liverpool | 0–2 | Nacional |
|---|---|---|
| Santucho (yellow card) 18'; Díaz (yellow card) 26'; Montero (yellow card) 71' | Report | Blanco 6', 84'; Ferro (yellow card) 17'; Varela (yellow card) 26'; Muñoz (yellow card) 60'; Lembo (yellow card) 79' |

Estadio Centenario, Montevideo
Attendance: 14,000
Referee: Martín Vázquez

2010-02-19
19:30 (UTC-3)

| Nacional | 1–4 | River Plate |
|---|---|---|
| Pereyra (yellow card) 57'; Blanco 76' | Report | J. Cordoba 17', 46', 66'; Montelongo 40'; J. Rodríguez (yellow card) 49' |

Estadio Gran Parque Central, Montevideo
Attendance: 22,500
Referee: Fernando Cabrera

2010-02-27
19:00 (UTC-3)

| Racing | 0–3 | Nacional |
|---|---|---|
| Tejera (yellow card) 38'; Cazulo (yellow card) 78'; Keosseian (yellow card) 83' | Report | Núñez (yellow card) 13'; Varela 41' (yellow card) 64'; Balsas 42'; Ferro (yellow card) 59'; Goñi (yellow card) 83'; García 88' |

Estadio Centenario, Montevideo
Attendance: 15,000
Referee: Javier Bentancor

2010-03-06
19:00 (UTC-3)

| Nacional | 2–1 | Montevideo Wanderers |
|---|---|---|
| Varela 15' (pen.), 63' (yellow card) 76'; Regueiro (yellow card) 40'; O. Morles (yellow card) 87' | Report | Quagliotti (yellow card) 36'; D. Pérez (yellow card) 42'; Corujo (yellow card) 44'; R. Pérez 53'; Ferreira (yellow card) 61' |

Estadio Gran Parque Central, Montevideo
Attendance: 23,000
Referee: Roberto Silvera

2010-03-13
19:00 (UTC-3)

| Atenas | 0–6 | Nacional |
|---|---|---|
| Arriola (yellow card) 5'; La Cruz (yellow card) 5'; Da Silva (red card) 60'; Yantorno (yellow card) 89' | Report | Blanco 6' (pen.), 8', 79' (pen.); Núñez (yellow card) 17'; Balsas 22', 71'; Pereyra 25' |

Estadio Domingo Burgueño, Maldonado
Attendance: 20,000
Referee: Liber Prudente

2010-03-21
19:00 (UTC-3)

| Central Español | 0–2 | Nacional |
|---|---|---|
| | Report | Regueiro 19'; Blanco 64' |

Estadio Centenario, Montevideo
Attendance: 8,000
Referee: Jorge Larrionda

2010-03-27
16:00 (UTC-3)

| Cerro | 3–1 | Nacional |
|---|---|---|
| Melo (yellow card) 11'; Mora 24', 41'; Caballero 38'; Asconeguy (yellow card) 69'; Dadomo (yellow card) 78' | Report | Varela 5' (yellow card) 10'; Ferro (yellow card) 30'; Regueiro (red card) 44'; O. Morales (yellow card) 75'; Blanco (yellow card) 45+5' |

Estadio Luis Tróccoli, Montevideo
Attendance: 20,000
Referee: Oscar Rojas

2010-04-03
16:00 (UTC-3)

| Rampla Juniors | 1–0 | Nacional |
|---|---|---|
| Dzeruvs 28' (yellow card) 62'; Lapolla (yellow card) 37'; Benia (red card) 40'; Perujo (yellow card) 69' | Report | Coates (yellow card) 46'; González (yellow card) 57'; García (yellow card) 76'; O. Morales (yellow card) 85' |

Estadio Centenario, Montevideo
Attendance: 13,000
Referee: Heber Rodríguez

2010-01-10
16:00 (UTC-3)

| Nacional | 2–1 | Danubio |
|---|---|---|
| Calzada (yellow card) 17'; Regueiro (yellow card) 26' (goal) 43'; Godoy (yellow card) 46'; González 85' | Report | Pumar (yellow card) 26' (red card) 88'; Miguez (yellow card) 31'; Silva 52'; Porras (yellow card) 84' |

Estadio Gran Parque Central, Montevideo
Attendance: 24,000
Referee: Darío Ubriaco

2010-04-17
16:00 (UTC-3)

| Peñarol | 0–0 | Nacional |
|---|---|---|
| Aguirregaray (yellow card) 10'; Arévalo Rios (yellow card) 38'; Orteman (yellow card) 74' | Report | Blanco (yellow card) 20'; Núñez (yellow card) 23'; Lembo (yellow card) 43'; Ferro (yellow card) 66'; García (yellow card) 90+2' |

Estadio Centenario, Montevideo
Attendance: 55,000
Referee: Martín Vázquez

2010-04-23
19:00 (UTC-3)

| Nacional | 1–1 | Fénix |
|---|---|---|
| Goñi 9'; Pereyra (yellow card) 54'; Cabrera (yellow card) 87' | Report | Gerardo Varela (yellow card) 15'; Galain 63' (o.g.) |

Estadio Gran Parque Central, Montevideo
Attendance: 15,000
Referee: Roberto Silvera

2010-05-02
15:30 (UTC-3)

| Nacional | 3–1 | Cerrito |
|---|---|---|
| Píriz (yellow card) 12'; Galain (yellow card) 17'; Blanco 30' (pen.); Núñez (yellow card) 53'; Guigou 72' (pen.); García 83' | Report | Techera (yellow card) 44'; Canosa (yellow card) 70'; Ronchetti 74' (yellow card) 75' (yellow-red card) 90+2'; Foletti (yellow card) 89' |

Estadio Gran Parque Central, Montevideo
Attendance: 18,000
Referee: Fernando Falce

=== Aggregate table ===
| Pos | Team | Pld | W | D | L | GF | GA | GD | Pts | Qualification |
|---|---|---|---|---|---|---|---|---|---|---|
| 1 | Peñarol | 30 | 21 | 6 | 3 | 68 | 34 | +34 | 69 | 2011 Copa Libertadores Second Stage (Note: Peñarol and Nacional are qualified as the season finalists (the Apertura and Clausura winners)) |
| 2 | Nacional | 30 | 21 | 3 | 6 | 63 | 26 | +37 | 63 (Note: Nacional was docked three points.) | 2011 Copa Libertadores Second Stage |
| 3 | Liverpool | 30 | 14 | 9 | 7 | 53 | 35 | +18 | 51 | 2011 Copa Libertadores First Stage |
| 4 | River Plate | 30 | 12 | 10 | 8 | 55 | 42 | +13 | 46 | 2010 Copa Sudamericana First Stage |
| 5 | Defensor Sporting | 30 | 13 | 7 | 10 | 49 | 44 | +5 | 46 | 2010 Copa Sudamericana First Stage |

Updated to match(es) played on May 2, 2010. Source: AUF
Rules for classification: 1st points; 2nd goal difference; 3rd goals scored; 4th head-to-head results; 5th draw
Notes:
- The Aggregate winner qualify for the final of Primera División and 2011 Copa Libertadores group stage.
- The Aggregate runners-up (if not qualified for the final) qualify for the 2011 Copa Libertadores first stage.
- The Aggregate third place (if not qualified for the final) qualify for the 2010 Copa Sudamericana first stage.
- The Aggregate fourth place (if not qualified for the final) qualify for the 2010 Copa Sudamericana first stage.

==== Results by round ====
| Round | 1 | 2 | 3 | 4 | 5 | 6 | 7 | 8 | 9 | 10 | 11 | 12 | 13 | 14 | 15 | 16 | 17 | 18 | 19 | 20 | 21 | 22 | 23 | 24 | 25 | 26 | 27 | 28 | 29 | 30 |
|---|---|---|---|---|---|---|---|---|---|---|---|---|---|---|---|---|---|---|---|---|---|---|---|---|---|---|---|---|---|---|
| Ground | A | H | A | H | A | H | A | H | H | H | H | A | H | A | A | H | A | H | A | H | A | H | A | A | A | A | H | A | H | H |
| Result | W | W | W | W | L | W | L | W | W | W | W | W | W | W | W | W | D | L | W | L | W | W | W | W | L | L | W | D | D | W |
| Position | 10 | 7 | 3 | 1 | 3 | 3 | 6 | 4 | 3 | 2 | 2 | 1 | 1 | 1 | 1 | 1 | 1 | 1 | 1 | 1 | 1 | 1 | 1 | 1 | 2 | 2 | 2 | 2 | 2 | 2 |

Updated to match(es) played on 2010-05-02. Source: Matches
A = Away; H = Home; W = Win; D = Draw; L = Loss

=== Relegation ===
| Pos | Team | Pld | W | D | L | GF | GA | GD | Pts |
|---|---|---|---|---|---|---|---|---|---|
| 1 | Nacional | 59 | 37 | 10 | 12 | 113 | 60 | +53 | 118 (Note: Nacional was docked three points.) |
| 2 | Peñarol | 59 | 36 | 12 | 11 | 119 | 64 | +55 | 120 |
| 3 | Defensor Sporting | 59 | 33 | 11 | 15 | 101 | 71 | +30 | 110 |
| 4 | Liverpool | 59 | 28 | 19 | 12 | 97 | 67 | +30 | 103 |
| 5 | River Plate | 59 | 25 | 18 | 16 | 103 | 78 | +25 | 96 (Note: In the previous season, Rampla Juniors was docked three points won against River Plate, to whom the points were then awarded to.) |

Updated to match(es) played on May 2, 2010. Source: AUF
Rules for classification: 1st points; 2nd goal difference; 3rd goals scored; 4th head-to-head results; 5th draw
Notes:
- The three clubs with lowest points are relegated.

=== Semi-final ===
2010-05-12
20:30 (UTC-3)

| Peñarol | 0–2 | Nacional |
|---|---|---|
| Orteman (yellow card) 17'; Ramírez (yellow card) 23'; Arévalo Ríos (yellow card) 33'; Martinuccio (yellow card) 85' | Report | O. Morales (yellow card) 6'; García 13', 59'; Regueiro (yellow card) 16'; Varela (yellow card) 21' |

Estadio Centenario, Montevideo
Attendance: 50,000
Referee: Jorge Larrionda

=== Final ===
==== First leg ====
2010-05-16
16:00 (UTC-3)

| Nacional | 0–1 | Peñarol |
|---|---|---|
| Coates (yellow card) 17'; Lembo (yellow card) 45'; Varela (yellow card) 61'; García (yellow card) 62'; Calzada (red card) 63'; Cabrera (red card) 77'; Regueiro (yellow card) 90' | Report | Pacheco 23'; Alejandro González (yellow card) 43'; D. Rodríguez (yellow card) 62'; Urretavizcaya (red card) 72'; Olivera (red card) 90+4' |

Estadio Centenario, Montevideo
Attendance: 35,000
Referee: Héctor Martínez

==== Second leg ====
2010-05-16
16:00 (UTC-3)

| Peñarol | 1–1 | Nacional |
|---|---|---|
| Ramírez (yellow card) 22' (yellow-red card) 80'; G. Rodríguez (yellow card) 33'; Albín (yellow card) 37'; Aguirregaray (yellow card) 44' (goal) 68'; Sosa (yellow card) 90+1' | Report | Varela (yellow card) 12'; Lembo 35' (yellow card) 70'; Pereyra (yellow card) 72'; Blanco (red card) 88'; Regueiro (yellow card) 90+3' |

Estadio Centenario, Montevideo
Attendance: 40,000
Referee: Darío Ubriaco

Peñarol won 2–1 on aggregate

== Copa Libertadores ==
=== Group stage ===
| Pos | Team | Pld | W | D | L | GF | GA | GD | Pts |
|---|---|---|---|---|---|---|---|---|---|
| 1 | (Uruguay) Nacional | 6 | 3 | 3 | 0 | 9 | 4 | +5 | 12 |
| 2 | (Argentina) Banfield | 6 | 3 | 2 | 1 | 13 | 8 | +5 | 11 |
| 3 | (Mexico) Morelia | 6 | 1 | 2 | 3 | 4 | 8 | −4 | 5 |
| 4 | (Ecuador) Deportivo Cuenca | 6 | 1 | 1 | 4 | 7 | 13 | −6 | 4 |

2010-02-11
19:00 (UTC-3)

| Nacional (Uruguay) | 3–2 | (Ecuador) Deportivo Cuenca |
|---|---|---|
| Regueiro 46', 64' (yellow card) 65'; Varela (yellow card) 47'; A. Morales 85' (pen.) | Report | Granda 24'; J. García (yellow card) 58'; M. Hurtado (yellow card) 59'; Escalada 67'; Méndez (yellow card) 88' |

Estadio Gran Parque Central, Montevideo
Attendance: 24,500
Referee: Enrique Osses (Chile)

2010-02-24
01:10 (UTC-3)

| Morelia (Mexico) | 0–0 | (Uruguay) Nacional |
|---|---|---|
| Borgetti (yellow card) 51'; Durán (yellow card) 64'; Sabah (red card) 85' | Report | Coates (yellow card) 51'; Lembo (yellow card) 53'; Balsas (yellow card) 63'; Regueiro (yellow card) 82' |

Estadio Morelos, Morelos
Attendance: 41,000
Referee: Francisco Peñuela (Colombia)

2010-03-10
20:30 (UTC-3)

| Nacional (Uruguay) | 2–2 | (Argentina) Banfield |
|---|---|---|
| Varela 8'; Regueiro 40'; Núñez (yellow card) 41'; O. Morales (yellow card) 49'; Lembo (yellow card) 67'; Coates (yellow card) 67' | Report | J. Rodríguez 17', 43' (pen.) (yellow card) 55'; Barraza (yellow card) 48'; Ramírez (yellow card) 71'; Pio (yellow card) 82' |

Estadio Centenario, Montevideo
Attendance: 50,000
Referee: Hebert Lopes (Brazil)

2010-03-16
19:30 (UTC-3)

| Banfield (Argentina) | 0–2 | (Uruguay) Nacional |
|---|---|---|
| Battión (yellow card) 15'; López (yellow card) 45+2'; Barraza (yellow card) 74'; J. Rodríguez (yellow card) 77' | Report | Ferro (yellow card) 6'; Coates 34'; Godoy 42'; Calzada (yellow card) 69' |

Estadio Florencio Solá, Banfield
Attendance: 33,000
Referee: Wilson Seneme (Brazil)

2010-04-07
20:15 (UTC-3)

| Deportivo Cuenca (Ecuador) | 0–0 | (Uruguay) Nacional |
|---|---|---|
| Narvaez (yellow card) 33'; Ianiero (yellow card) 39'; J. García (yellow card) 45+1'; Ayoví (yellow card) 68'; Escalada (yellow card) 87' | Report | Goñi (yellow card) 22'; González (yellow card) 27'; Coates (yellow card) 36'; Muñoz (yellow card) 43'; Calzada (yellow card) 48'; O. Morales (red card) 90+1' |

Estadio Alejandro Serrano Aguilar, Cuenca
Attendance: 8,000
Referee: Pablo Pozo (Chile)

2010-04-21
19:30 (UTC-3)

| Nacional (Uruguay) | 2–0 | (Mexico) Morelia |
|---|---|---|
| Regueiro 3'; Ferro (yellow card) 37'; Pereyra 78' | Report | Marvin Cabrera (yellow card) 40'; Durán (yellow card) 59'; Hernández (yellow card) 65'; Silva (yellow card) 69' |

Estadio Gran Parque Central, Montevideo
Attendance: 25,000
Referee: Paulo César de Oliveira (Brazil)

=== Round of 16 ===
==== First leg ====
2010-04-29
19:00 (UTC-3)

| Cruzeiro (Brazil) | 3–1 | (Uruguay) Nacional |
|---|---|---|
| Thiago Ribeiro 7', 22', 42' | Report | González (yellow card) 37'; Ferro (yellow card) 40'; Regueiro 50'; Lembo (yellow card) 76'; Godoy (yellow card) 83' |

Estádio Governador Magalhães Pinto, Belo Horizonte
Attendance: 40,000
Referee: Héctor Baldassi (Argentina)

==== Second leg ====
2010-05-05
21:50 (UTC-3)

| Nacional (Uruguay) | 0–3 | (Brazil) Cruzeiro |
|---|---|---|
| Coates (yellow card) 28' (yellow-red card) 53'; Lembo (yellow card) 45+3'; Pereyra (yellow card) 64'; Varela (red card) 69'; Ferro (yellow card) 76' | Report | Thiago Ribeiro 29'; Gil (yellow card) 45+3'; Diego Renan 48'; Leonardo Silva (red card) 54'; Thiago Heleno (yellow card) 68'; Gilberto 80' |

Estadio Gran Parque Central, Montevideo
Attendance: 25,000
Referee: Federico Beligoy (Argentina)

Cruzeiro won 6–1 on aggregate.

== Records ==
=== Doubles achieved ===
| Opponent | Home result | Away result |
|---|---|---|
| Cerro Largo | 3–1 | 1–0 |
| Liverpool | 2–1 | 2–0 |
| Racing | 3–2 | 3–0 |
| Atenas | 5–0 | 6–0 |
| Central Español | 5–1 | 2–0 |
| Danubio | 2–1 | 2–0 |
| Cerrito | 3–1 | 5–2 |

=== Comeback ===
Nacional have conceded the first goal in a match 10 times this season in the Primera División and the Copa Libertadores, recorded 5 wins, 1 draw and 5 loss.

| Opponent | H/A | Result | Scoreline |
|---|---|---|---|
| Liverpool | H | 2–1 | Alfaro 66', Matías Rodríguez 73', Lembo 86' |
| Racing | H | 3–2 | Cauteruccio 8', Quiñones 14', Balsas 45+3' (pen.), 49, Ferro 79' |
| Central Español | H | 5–1 | Espiga 49', Aranda 56', García 66' (pen.), Lodeiro 71', Blanco 72', Varela 82' |
| Cerrito | A | 5–2 | Franco 4', 90', A. Morales 5', Lodeiro 12', 32' (pen.), Varela 54', Blanco 83' |
| Deportivo Cuenca | H | 3–2 | Granda 24', Regueiro 46', 64', Escalada 67', A. Morales 82' (pen.) |

=== Biggest winning margin ===
| # | Opponent | H/A | Result | Competition |
|---|---|---|---|---|
| 1 | Atenas | A | 6–0 | Primera División |
| 2 | Atenas | H | 5–0 | Primera División |
| 3 | Central Español | H | 5–1 | Primera División |
| 4 | Cerrito | A | 5–2 | Primera División |
| 5 | Defensor Sporting | A | 3–0 | Primera División |
| 5 | Rampla Juniors | H | 3–0 | Primera División |
| 5 | Peñarol | H | 3–0 | Primera División |
| 5 | Racing | A | 3–0 | Primera División |
| 9 | Cerro Largo | H | 3–1 | Primera División |
| 9 | Cerrito | H | 3–1 | Primera División |

== Team statistics ==
=== Goal minutes ===
Updated to games played on 18 May 2010.

| 1'–15' | 16'–30' | 31'–HT | 46'–60' | 61'–75' | 76'–FT |
|---|---|---|---|---|---|
| 14 | 10 | 13 | 10 | 12 | 17 |

== Honours ==
=== Team ===
Primera División Uruguaya Fair Play Award

- Winners: 2008–09

Copa Amistad

- Winners: 2009

Torneo Apertura

- Winners: 2009

Primera División Uruguaya Best team of the year

- Winners: 2009

Copa Bimbo

- Winners: 2010

Historical Table of the Copa Libertadores

- Winners: 2010

=== Individuals ===
| Name | Number | Country | Award |
|---|---|---|---|
| Gianni Guigou | 5 | Uruguay | Yumbo Man of the Match (week 30) |
| Ángel Morales | 10 | Argentina | Man of the final match in 2010 Copa Bimbo, Best player of the 2010 Copa Bimbo, Primera División Uruguaya Best Foreign Player of the season |
| Sergio Blanco | 11 | Uruguay | Yumbo Man of the Match (week 23) |
| Raúl Ferro | 13 | Uruguay | Yumbo Man of the Match (week 21 and 24) |
| Mario Regueiro | 14 | Uruguay | Yumbo Man of the Match (week 27), Primera División Uruguaya Fan's Best Forward of the season |
| Gustavo Varela | 16 | Uruguay | Yumbo Man of the Match (week 22) |
| Sebastián Coates | 19 | Uruguay | Primera División Uruguaya Best Defender of the season, Primera División Uruguaya Fan's Best Defender of the season |
| Santiago García | 20 | Uruguay | Yumo man of the semi-final match |
| Oscar Javier Morales | 21 | Uruguay | Man of the semi-final match in 2010 Copa Bimbo |
| Mauricio Pereyra | 22 | Uruguay | Yumbo Man of the Match (week 19) |
| Rodrigo Muñoz | 25 | Uruguay | Primera División Uruguaya Best Goalkeeper of the season, Primera División Uruguaya Fan's Best Goalkeeper of the season |
| Nicolás Lodeiro | — | Uruguay | 2009 America dream team, Primera División Uruguaya Best player of the year, Primera División Uruguaya Best Attacking Midfielder of the season, Primera División Uruguaya Fan's Best Midfielder of the season, Primera División Uruguaya Fan's Best Player of the season |
| Bryan Machado | — | Uruguay | 2010 International Tournament U–18 third place, 2010 International Tournament U–18 top goalscorer |
| Santiago Romero | — | Uruguay | 2010 International Tournament U–18 third place |
| Ricardo Alarcón | — | Uruguay | Primera División Uruguaya Best Chairman of the season |

== See also ==
- Club Nacional de Football
