= 2010 Campeonato Internacional de Verano =

Tournament details
- Host country: Uruguay
- Dates: 15 January – 18 January
- Teams: 4 (from 1 confederation)
- Venue: 1 (in 1 host city)

Final positions
- Champions: (Uruguay) Nacional (1st title)
- Runners-up: (Uruguay) Danubio
- Third place: (Paraguay) Nacional
- Fourth place: (Uruguay) Peñarol

Tournament statistics
- Matches played: 4
- Goals scored: 13 (3.25 per match)
- Top scorer(s): (Uruguay) Diego Ifrán (Uruguay) Diego Perrone (Paraguay) Ricardo Mazacote (2 goals each)
- Best player: (Argentina) Ángel Morales

The Campeonato Internacional de Verano 2010, also known after its sponsored name Copa Bimbo 2010, was the second edition of the Campeonato Internacional de Verano, an exhibition international club football competition that featured three clubs from Uruguay and one from Paraguay. It was played in Montevideo, Uruguay at the Estadio Centenario from 15 to 18 January 2010. It was won by Uruguayan club Nacional, who defeated fellow Uruguayan side Danubio in the final.

== Bracket ==
Semi-finals
(Uruguay) Danubio | 5
(Paraguay) Nacional | 2
(Uruguay) Nacional | 0 (6)
(Uruguay) Peñarol | 0 (5)

Final
(Uruguay) Danubio | 1 (1)
(Uruguay) Nacional | 1 (3)
Third place
(Paraguay) Nacional | 2 (3)
(Uruguay) Peñarol | 2 (1)

== Matches ==
=== Semi-finals ===
2010-01-15
20:00 (UTC-3)

| Danubio (Uruguay) | 5 – 2 | (Paraguay) Nacional |
|---|---|---|
| Ifrán 9', 73'; Grossmüller 44'; Perrone 79'; Silva 88' | Report (in Spanish) | Miranda 17'; Mazacote 47' |

Estadio Centenario, Montevideo
Referee: Liber Prudente (Uruguay)

2010-01-15
22:00 (UTC-3)

| Nacional (Uruguay) | 0 – 0 | (Uruguay) Peñarol |
|---|---|---|
| | Report (in Spanish) |
Penalties
| Guigou (penalty scored); A. Morales (penalty scored); Varela (penalty scored); Vera (penalty missed); Lembo (penalty scored); Muñoz (penalty scored); O. Morales (penalty scored) | 6 – 5 | (penalty scored) Orteman; (penalty missed) Ramírez; (penalty scored) Ramis; (penalty scored) Albín; (penalty scored) Olivera; (penalty scored) Urretavizcaya; (penalty missed) Alejandro González |

Estadio Centenario, Montevideo
Referee: Jorge Larrionda (Uruguay)

=== Third place ===
2010-01-18
20:00 (UTC-3)

| Nacional (Paraguay) | 2 – 2 | (Uruguay) Peñarol |
|---|---|---|
| Mazacote 31'; Irala 90+3' | Report (in Spanish) | Olivera 11'; Alonso 45+3' (pen.) |
Penalties
| Caballero (penalty scored); Miranda (penalty scored); Irala (penalty missed); Ramos (penalty scored) | 3 – 1 | (penalty missed) Orteman; (penalty missed) Pacheco; (penalty scored) Albín; (penalty missed) Alcoba |

Estadio Centenario, Montevideo
Referee: Yimmi Alvarez (Uruguay)

=== Final ===
2010-01-18
22:00 (UTC-3)

| Danubio (Uruguay) | 1 – 1 | (Uruguay) Nacional |
|---|---|---|
| Perrone 78' | Report (in Spanish) | Blanco 90+1' |
Penalties
| Perrone (penalty missed); Mena (penalty missed); Ifrán (penalty scored); Miguez (penalty missed) | 1 – 3 | (penalty scored) Varela; (penalty scored) A. Morales; (penalty missed) A. González; (penalty scored) Ferro |

Estadio Centenario, Montevideo
Referee: Darío Ubriaco (Uruguay)

| Danubio | Nacional |

DANUBIO:
| GK | 1 | (Uruguay) Mauro Goicoechea |
| RB | 3 | (Uruguay) Fabián Pumar (substituted off) 55' |
| CB | 26 | (Uruguay) Marcelo Silva (yellow card) 86' |
| CB | 8 | (Uruguay) Marcelo González (substituted off) 55' |
| LB | 13 | (Uruguay) Pablo Cáceres |
| DM | 5 | (Uruguay) Ignacio Porras |
| RW | 16 | (Uruguay) Matías Porcari (substituted off) 69' |
| LW | 15 | (Uruguay) Pablo Miguez |
| AM | 11 | (Uruguay) Álvaro Recoba (c) (substituted off) 59' |
| AM | 20 | (Uruguay) Carlos Grossmüller (substituted off) 75' |
| FW | 9 | (Uruguay) Diego Ifrán |
Substitutes:
| GK | 12 | (Uruguay) Javier Irazún |
| DF | 27 | (Uruguay) Andrés Silva (substituted on) 55' |
| DF | 14 | (Uruguay) Carlos Peruena (substituted on) 55' |
| MF | 10 | (Uruguay) Diego Perrone (substituted on) 69' |
| MF | 19 | (Uruguay) Matías Zunino (substituted on) 75' |
| FW | 25 | (Colombia) Daley Mena (substituted on) 59' |
Manager:
(Uruguay) Jorge Giordano

NACIONAL:
| GK | 1 | (Uruguay) Leonardo Burián |
| RB | 4 | (Uruguay) Christian Núñez (yellow card) 77' |
| CB | 18 | (Uruguay) Gonzalo Godoy |
| CB | 19 | (Uruguay) Sebastián Coates |
| LB | 6 | (Uruguay) Ernesto Goñi |
| DM | 8 | (Uruguay) Maximiliano Calzada (substituted off) 81' |
| RW | 7 | (Paraguay) Eduardo Aranda (substituted off) 56' |
| LW | 5 | (Uruguay) Gianni Guigou (c) (substituted off) 75' |
| AM | 22 | (Uruguay) Mauricio Pereyra (substituted off) 85' |
| FW | 24 | (Uruguay) Diego Vera |
| FW | 20 | (Uruguay) Santiago García (substituted off) 56' |
Substitutes:
| GK | 25 | (Uruguay) Rodrigo Muñoz |
| DF | 2 | (Uruguay) Alejandro Lembo |
| DF | 3 | (Uruguay) Martín Galain |
| MF | 16 | (Uruguay) Gustavo Varela (substituted on) 56' |
| MF | 21 | (Uruguay) Oscar Javier Morales |
| MF | 23 | (Uruguay) Facundo Píriz |
| MF | 10 | (Argentina) Ángel Morales (substituted on) 75' |
| MF | 13 | (Uruguay) Raúl Ferro (substituted on) 81' |
| MF | 15 | (Uruguay) Álvaro González (substituted on) 56' |
| FW | 11 | (Uruguay) Sergio Blanco (substituted on) 85' |
Manager:
(Uruguay) Eduardo Acevedo

Man of the match:

(Argentina) Ángel Morales
Assistant referees:
(Uruguay) William Casavieja
(Uruguay) Marcelo Costa
Fourth official:
(Uruguay) Yimmi Alvarez

Copa Bimbo
2010 Winners

Nacional
1st title

== Scorers ==
2 goals

- (Uruguay) Diego Ifrán (Danubio)
- (Uruguay) Diego Perrone (Danubio)
- (Paraguay) Ricardo Mazacote (Nacional)

1 goal

- (Uruguay) Carlos Grossmüller (Danubio)
- (Uruguay) Marcelo Andrés Silva (Danubio)
- (Paraguay) Herminio Miranda (Nacional)
- (Paraguay) Blas Irala (Nacional)
- (Uruguay) Rubén Olivera (Peñarol)
- (Uruguay) Diego Alonso (Peñarol)
- (Uruguay) Sergio Blanco (Nacional)
