= List of Uruguayan football transfers 2007–08 =

Uruguay transfer windows was opened in summer break after the Apertura season, and before the Apertura.

== International transfers ==
=== Apertura ===
In

- (Uruguay) Mauricio Victorino from Veracruz to Nacional
- (Uruguay) Martín Ligüera from Alianza Lima to Nacional
- (Uruguay) Diego Perrone from Olimpia Asunción to Nacional
- (Uruguay) Oscar Javier Morales from Málaga CF to Nacional
- (Uruguay) Richard Morales from Málaga CF to Nacional
- (Paraguay) Derlis Florentín from Palmeiras to Nacional

Out

- (Uruguay) Fernando Muslera from Nacional to S.S. Lazio
- (Uruguay) Diego Godín from Nacional to Villarreal CF
- (Uruguay) Walter Gargano from Danubio to Napoli
- (Uruguay) Álvaro González from Defensor to Boca Juniors
- (Uruguay) Maxi Pereira from Defensor to S.L. Benfica
- (Uruguay) Egidio Arévalo from C.A. Peñarol to CF Monterrey
- (Uruguay) Ignacio Ithurralde from Defensor to CF Monterrey
- (Uruguay) Pablo Pallante from Cerro to Grosseto
- (Argentina) Leonardo Celiz from CA Bella Vista to Deportivo Coreano
- (Uruguay) Carlos Adrián Valdez from Nacional to Reggina Calcio

=== Clausura ===
In

- (Uruguay) Fabián Estoyanoff from Valencia CF to C.A. Peñarol
- (Uruguay) Rubén Olivera from Juventus FC to C.A. Peñarol
- (Uruguay) Carlos Bueno from Boca Juniors to C.A. Peñarol
- (Uruguay) Sergio Blanco from Shanghai Shenhua to Nacional

Out

- (Uruguay) Williams Martínez from Defensor Sporting to Valenciennes FC
- (Uruguay) Richard Porta from River Plate to A.C. Siena
- (Uruguay) Christian Stuani from Danubio to Reggina
- (Uruguay) Matías Masiero from Central Español to Genoa
- (Uruguay) Juan Guillermo Castillo from Peñarol to Botafogo
- (Uruguay) Martín Rodriguez from River Plate to Banfield
- (Uruguay) Ignacio María González from Danubio to AS Monaco
- (Uruguay) Sebastián Rosano from Montevideo Wanderers to Cagliari
- (Uruguay) Pablo Munhoz from Nacional to Wuhan Guanggu
