= 2005 DFL-Ligapokal final =

German League Cup
- Event: 2005 DFL-Ligapokal
VfB Stuttgart	Schalke 04
0	1
- Date: 2 August 2005
- Venue: Zentralstadion, Leipzig
- Referee: Lutz Wagner (Kriftel)
- Attendance: 40,000

The 2005 DFL-Ligapokal final decided the winner of the 2005 DFL-Ligapokal, the 9th edition of the reiterated DFL-Ligapokal, a knockout football cup competition.

The match was played on 2 August 2005 at the Zentralstadion in Leipzig. Schalke 04 won the match 1–0 against VfB Stuttgart for their 1st title.

== Teams ==
Team	Qualification for tournament	Previous appearances (bold indicates winners)
VfB Stuttgart	2004–05 Bundesliga fifth place	2 (1997, 1998)
Schalke 04	2004–05 Bundesliga runners-up	2 (2001, 2002)

== Route to the final ==
The DFL-Ligapokal is a six team single-elimination knockout cup competition. There are a total of two rounds leading up to the final. Four teams enter the preliminary round, with the two winners advancing to the semi-finals, where they will be joined by two additional clubs who were given a bye. For all matches, the winner after 90 minutes advances. If still tied, extra time, and if necessary penalties are used to determine the winner.

VfB Stuttgart		Round	Schalke 04
Opponent	Result	2005 DFL-Ligapokal	Opponent	Result
Hertha BSC	0–0 (4–3 p)	Preliminary round	Bye
Bayern Munich	2–1	Semi-finals	Werder Bremen	2–1

== Match ==
=== Details ===
2 August 2005
20:30 CEST

VfB Stuttgart	0–1	Schalke 04
	Report	Kurányi 10'

Zentralstadion, Leipzig
Attendance: 40,000
Referee: Lutz Wagner (Kriftel)

**VfB Stuttgart**	**Schalke 04**

GK	1	(Germany) Timo Hildebrand
RB	2	(Germany) Andreas Hinkel
CB	6	(Portugal) Fernando Meira	Booked
CB	17	(France) Matthieu Delpierre
LB	4	(Croatia) Boris Živković		(substituted off) 46'
CM	7	(Germany) Silvio Meißner	Booked
CM	20	(Croatia) Zvonimir Soldo (c)
CM	11	(Germany) Thomas Hitzlsperger	Booked
RW	18	(Brazil) Cacau
CF	33	(Germany) Mario Gómez		(substituted off) 46'
LW	22	(Denmark) Jesper Grønkjær		(substituted off) 64'
Substitutes:
GK	23	(Germany) Dirk Heinen
DF	5	(Germany) Markus Babbel
DF	21	(Switzerland) Ludovic Magnin		(substituted on) 46'
MF	16	(Germany) Horst Heldt
MF	40	(Germany) Christian Gentner
FW	9	(Switzerland) Marco Streller		(substituted on) 64'
FW	10	(Denmark) Jon Dahl Tomasson		(substituted on) 46'
Manager:
(Italy) Giovanni Trapattoni

GK	1	(Germany) Frank Rost (c)
RB	6	(Turkey) Hamit Altıntop
CB	5	(Brazil) Marcelo Bordon
CB	20	(Serbia and Montenegro) Mladen Krstajić
LB	3	(Georgia (country)) Levan Kobiashvili
DM	2	(Denmark) Christian Poulsen
CM	8	(Germany) Fabian Ernst	Booked
CM	25	(Bosnia and Herzegovina) Zlatan Bajramović
AM	10	(Brazil) Lincoln	(red card) 90+1'
CF	11	(Denmark) Ebbe Sand		(substituted off) 62'
CF	22	(Germany) Kevin Kurányi	(red card) 66'
Substitutes:
GK	29	(Germany) Manuel Neuer
DF	15	(Poland) Tomasz Wałdoch
DF	16	(Uruguay) Darío Rodríguez
DF	27	(Germany) Tim Hoogland
MF	19	(Uruguay) Gustavo Varela
FW	9	(Denmark) Søren Larsen
FW	14	(Germany) Gerald Asamoah		(substituted on) 62'
Manager:
(Germany) Ralf Rangnick
