= Pumar =

Pumar is a surname. Notable people with the surname include:

- Fabián Pumar (born 1976), Uruguayan footballer
- Fernando Pumar (born 1989), Spanish footballer
- Omar Pumar (born 1970), Venezuelan cyclist
