= José Granda =

José Granda may refer to:

- José Granda (footballer, born 1984), Ecuadorian football midfielder
- José Granda (footballer, born 1992), Peruvian football centre-back

== See also ==
- José Grande (born 1944), Spanish cyclist
