= 2005 DFL-Ligapokal =

- Tournament programme cover

Tournament details
- Country: Germany
- Teams: 6

Final positions
- Champions: Schalke 04
- Runners-up: VfB Stuttgart

Tournament statistics
- Matches played: 5
- Goals scored: 8 (1.6 per match)

The 2005 DFL-Ligapokal was the ninth edition of the Ligapokal, now under control of the Deutsche Fußball Liga (DFL) as opposed to the German Football Association (DFB). The competition saw some format changes, with the preliminary round matches being played consecutively in the same stadium, and the final moved to the new Zentralstadion in Leipzig. Schalke 04 won their first title, beating VfB Stuttgart 1–0 in the final.

== Participating clubs ==
A total of six teams qualified for the competition. The labels in the parentheses show how each team qualified for the place of its starting round:

- 1st, 2nd, 3rd, 4th, etc.: League position
- CW: Cup winners
- TH: Title holders

Semi-finals
Bayern Munich^{TH} (1st + CW)	Schalke 04 (2nd)
Preliminary round
Werder Bremen (3rd)	VfB Stuttgart (5th)
Hertha BSC (4th)	Bayer Leverkusen (6th)

== Matches ==
=== Preliminary round ===
23 July 2005
20:30

Werder Bremen	1–0	Bayer Leverkusen
Klasnić 19'	Report

LTU Arena, Düsseldorf
Attendance: 25,000
Referee: Manuel Gräfe

23 July 2005
18:15

Hertha BSC	0–0	VfB Stuttgart
	Report
Penalties
Marcelinho (penalty scored); Marx (penalty missed); Salihović (penalty scored); Kovač (penalty missed); Chahed (penalty scored)	3–4	(penalty missed) Hinkel; (penalty scored) Heldt; (penalty scored) Soldo; (penalty scored) Hitzlsperger; (penalty scored) Tomasson

LTU Arena, Düsseldorf
Attendance: 25,000
Referee: Wolfgang Stark

=== Semi-finals ===
26 July 2005
20:30

Bayern Munich	1–2	VfB Stuttgart
Makaay 19'	Report	Hitzlsperger 22'; Stranzl 90'

Allianz Arena, Munich
Attendance: 40,000
Referee: Thorsten Kinhöfer

27 July 2005
20:30

Schalke 04	2–1	Werder Bremen
Bajramović 34'; Sand 71'	Report	Valdez 90'

Veltins-Arena, Gelsenkirchen
Attendance: 50,000
Referee: Helmut Fleischer

=== Final ===
2 August 2005
20:30 CEST

VfB Stuttgart	0–1	Schalke 04
	Report	Kurányi 10'

Zentralstadion, Leipzig
Attendance: 40,000
Referee: Lutz Wagner (Kriftel)

== See also ==
- 2005–06 Bundesliga
- 2005–06 DFB-Pokal
