= Planchon =

Planchon may refer to:

- Jules Émile Planchon (1823–1888), a French botanist
- Roger Planchon (1931–2009), a French playwright and director
- Rubén Planchón (born 1982), a Uruguayan football player

== See also ==
- Planchón-Peteroa, a complex volcano extending in a north–south direction along the border between Argentina and Chile
