= Leonardo Celiz =

Argentine football midfielder

Personal information
- Full name: Leonardo Damian Celiz
- Date of birth: January 26, 1983 (age 43)
- Place of birth: Isidro Casanova, Argentina
- Position: Midfielder

Senior career*
Years	Team	Apps	(Gls)
2004–2005	Racing Club de Avellaneda	15	(0)
2005	Almirante Brown		
2006	Alvarado		
2006	FBC Melgar	2	(0)
2007	CA Bella Vista		
2007–	UAI Urquiza		
- * Club domestic league appearances and goals as of 08:13, 20 April 2009 (UTC)

Leonardo Damian Celiz (born 26 January 1983) is an Argentine football midfielder. He currently plays for Deportivo Coreano in Torneo Argentino B.
