= Sebastián Balsas =

Uruguayan footballer (born 1986)

Personal information
- Full name: Sebastián Andrés Balsas Bruno
- Date of birth: 5 March 1986 (age 40)
- Place of birth: Montevideo, Uruguay
- Height: 1.97 m (6 ft 6 in)
- Position: Centre forward

Team information
- Current team: Independiente Rivadavia

Senior career*
Years	Team	Apps	(Gls)
2007–2009	Racing Montevideo	26	(12)
2009–2010	Nacional	20	(5)
2010	San Lorenzo	16	(3)
2011–2012	Racing Montevideo	3	(1)
2011–2012	→ Córdoba (loan)	4	(0)
2012	Argentinos Juniors	8	(1)
2012–2014	Independiente Rivadavia	3	(0)
2014	Racing Montevideo	0	(0)
2014–2015	L'Aquila	0	(0)
Total		80	(22)
- * Club domestic league appearances and goals

Sebastián Andrés Balsas Bruno (born 5 March 1986 in Montevideo) is a Uruguayan former professional footballer who played as a centre forward.

== Honours ==
Racing Montevideo

- Uruguayan Segunda División: 2007–08
