= Simón Vanderhoeght =

Uruguayan footballer (born 1986)

Personal information
- Full name: Simón Vanderhoeght Santos
- Date of birth: 5 June 1986 (age 40)
- Place of birth: Maldonado, Uruguay
- Height: 1.75 m (5 ft 9 in)
- Position: Midfielder

Team information
- Current team: Dender EH
- Number: 14

Youth career
- 1993–2003: Atenas

Senior career*
| Years | Team | Apps | (Gls) |
| 2004–2007 | Atenas | | |
| 2007–2010 | Montevideo Wanderers | 39 | (4) |
| Jan. 2009 | → Hellas Verona (loan) | 1 | (0) |
| 2010–2011 | Deportivo Maldonado | 20 | (1) |
| 2011 | Lustenau | 11 | (0) |
| 2012 | Atenas | 18 | (2) |
| 2013 | Bella Vista | 10 | (1) |
| 2013–2015 | Atenas | 40 | (0) |
| 2015– | Dender EH | | |
- * Club domestic league appearances and goals as of July 8, 2015

Simón Vanderhoeght Santos (born 5 June 1986 in Maldonado) is a Uruguayan footballer currently playing for Dender EH in the Belgian Third Division.

== Early life ==
Vanderhoeght was born in Maldonado, Uruguay. He is of Belgian ancestry; his grandfather came from Belgium because he was against the Second World War. He holds a Belgian passport.

== Career ==
Vanderhoeght grew up from the youth levels of Atenas De San Carlos.

In January 2004, while playing the Punta Cup international youth tournament in Maldonado, Real Madrid's representatives put their eyes on him. He was offered a scholarship to train in Spain and they gave him the flight passages. However, there was a problem that prevented him to fulfill his dream. He had problems with papers of the Belgian passport and so he could not travel.

In January 2009, he went to try luck in Europe to play on the well known club Hellas Verona, which had to play in Serie C1 due to economical problems.

In early July 2015, Vanderhoeght departed again to Europe to play for Belgian side Dender EH.
