= Andrés Ravecca =

Uruguayan footballer

Personal information
- Full name: Andrés Ravecca Cadenas
- Date of birth: 9 January 1989 (age 37)
- Place of birth: Montevideo, Uruguay
- Height: 1.70 m (5 ft 7 in)
- Position: Right-back

Team information
- Current team: Deportivo Maldonado
- Number: 11

Youth career
- –2009: Cerro

Senior career*
| Years | Team | Apps | (Gls) |
| 2009–2013 | Cerro | 85 | (3) |
| 2013–2016 | Liverpool Montevideo | 19 | (1) |
| 2014–2016 | → Cerro (loan) | 28 | (1) |
| 2016– | Deportivo Maldonado | 75 | (6) |
- * Club domestic league appearances and goals as of 21:56, 29 October 2019 (UTC)

Andrés Ravecca Cadenas (born 2 January 1988 in Montevideo) is a Uruguayfootballer currently playing as a right-back for Deportivo Maldonado of the Uruguayan primera División.

== Career statistics ==
=== Club ===
As of 18 July 2018.

| Club | Season | League | | | Cup | | Continental | | Other | | Total | |
| Club | Season | Division | Apps | Goals | Apps | Goals | Apps | Goals | Apps | Goals | Apps | Goals |
|---|---|---|---|---|---|---|---|---|---|---|---|---|
| C.A. Cerro | 2009–10 | Uruguayan Primera División | 11 | 0 | 0 | 0 | – | | 0 | 0 | 11 | 0 |
| C.A. Cerro | 2010–11 | Uruguayan Primera División | 24 | 1 | 0 | 0 | – | | 0 | 0 | 24 | 1 |
| C.A. Cerro | 2011–12 | Uruguayan Primera División | 25 | 1 | 0 | 0 | – | | 0 | 0 | 25 | 1 |
| C.A. Cerro | 2012–13 | Uruguayan Primera División | 25 | 1 | 0 | 0 | – | | 0 | 0 | 25 | 1 |
| C.A. Cerro | Total | | 85 | 3 | 0 | 0 | 0 | 0 | 0 | 0 | 85 | 3 |
| Liverpool Montevideo | 2013–14 | Uruguayan Primera División | 19 | 1 | 0 | 0 | – | | 0 | 0 | 19 | 1 |
| C.A. Cerro (loan) | 2014–15 | Uruguayan Primera División | 20 | 0 | 0 | 0 | – | | 0 | 0 | 20 | 0 |
| C.A. Cerro (loan) | 2015–16 | Uruguayan Primera División | 8 | 1 | 0 | 0 | – | | 0 | 0 | 8 | 1 |
| C.A. Cerro (loan) | Total | | 28 | 1 | 0 | 0 | 0 | 0 | 0 | 0 | 28 | 1 |
| Deportivo Maldonado | 2016 | Uruguayan Segunda División | 9 | 2 | 0 | 0 | – | | 0 | 0 | 9 | 2 |
| Deportivo Maldonado | 2017 | Uruguayan Segunda División | 22 | 1 | 0 | 0 | – | | 0 | 0 | 22 | 1 |
| Deportivo Maldonado | 2018 | Uruguayan Segunda División | 10 | 1 | 0 | 0 | – | | 0 | 0 | 10 | 1 |
| Deportivo Maldonado | Total | | 41 | 4 | 0 | 0 | 0 | 0 | 0 | 0 | 41 | 4 |
| Career total | | | 173 | 9 | 0 | 0 | 0 | 0 | 0 | 0 | 173 | 9 |
