= Maximiliano Montero =

Uruguayan footballer (born 1988)

Maximiliano Felipe Montero Rodríguez (born August 27, 1988 in Montevideo, Uruguay) is a Uruguayan footballer currently playing for Envigado as a left back.

== Teams ==
- (Uruguay) Liverpool 2006–
- (Argentina) Tigre (loan) 2011–2012
- (Uruguay) Cerro Largo (loan) 2013
- (Colombia) Envigado (loan) 2013–
