= Sebastián Galán =

Uruguayan footballer (born 1984)

Sebastián Galán Rueda (born January 26, 1984, in Montevideo) is a Uruguayan footballer who plays for Canadian Soccer Club in the Uruguayan Segunda División.

== Career ==
The defender played during his career with Bella Vista, C.A. Basañez, Rampla Juniors, Montevideo Wanderers, Juventud de Las Piedras, Atenas de San Carlos, C.A. Cerro and CS Cerrito in Uruguay; as well for GC Biaschesi in Switzerland.

== Teams ==
- (Uruguay) Bella Vista (2004–2005)
- (Uruguay) C.A. Basañez (2005–2006)
- (Uruguay) Rampla Juniors (2007)
- (Uruguay) Peñarol (2007)
- (Uruguay) Montevideo Wanderers (2008)
- (Uruguay) Juventud (2008–2009)
- (Uruguay) Atenas (2009–2010)
- (Uruguay) Cerro (2011)
- (Switzerland) Biaschesi (2011)
- (Uruguay) Cerrito (2012)
- (Uruguay) Canadian Soccer Club (2013-now)
