= Julio Barraza =

Argentine football defender

Personal information
- Full name: Julio Eduardo Barraza
- Date of birth: April 3, 1980 (age 46)
- Place of birth: Santa Fe, Argentina
- Height: 1.86 m (6 ft 1 in)
- Position: Right back

Youth career
- –1996: Pucará
- 1996–2000: Banfield

Senior career*
Years	Team	Apps	(Gls)
2000–2011	Banfield	183	(5)
2011–2013	CA Colón	10	(0)
2013–2014	Argentinos Juniors	36	(3)
2014–2017	Crucero del Norte	17	(1)
2017–2018	Guaraní Antonio Franco		
- * Club domestic league appearances and goals

Julio Eduardo Barraza (born 3 April 1980) is a former Argentine footballer, who played primarily as a right back.

== Career ==
Barraza made his professional debut for Banfield in 2000, and went on to make over 200 appearances for the club (counting league and international competitions). In 2009, he was part of the squad that won the Argentine Primera División championship for the first time in the club's history, clinching the 2009 Apertura tournament on the final day of the season.

After 11 years playing professional football for Banfield, Barraza joined Colón for the 2011–12 Argentine Primera División season.

In winter 2014, he signs for Crucero del Norte with the goal of promoting to the Argentine First Division which he accomplished.

After a spell at Guaraní Antonio Franco in the 2017/18 season, Barraza retired from professional football.

== Honors ==
Banfield

- Primera División Argentina: Apertura 2009
