= Sergio Suffo =

Uruguayan footballer (born 1986)

Sergio Fabián Suffo Félix (born February 22, 1986, in Montevideo, Uruguay) is a Uruguayan footballer currently playing for Atenas de San Carlos.

== Teams ==
- Cerro 2006–2010
- San Martín de Mendoza 2010–2011
- Sol de América 2011–2012
- Cerro 2012–2013
- Atenas 2013–present
