= Juan Tejera =

Uruguayan footballer (born 1983)

Personal information
- Full name: Juan Andrés Tejera Arachichu
- Date of birth: 26 July 1983 (age 43)
- Place of birth: Montevideo, Uruguay
- Height: 1.89 m (6 ft 2 in)
- Positions: Centre-back; defensive midfielder

Youth career
- Liverpool de Montevideo

Senior career*
Years	Team	Apps	(Gls)
2003–2007	Liverpool de Montevideo	71	(1)
2008	Rentistas	13	(1)
2009	Boyacá Chicó	9	(0)
2009–2010	Central Español	21	(0)
2010–2012	Olimpo	23	(1)
2012–2015	Defensa y Justicia	61	(1)
2016	Juventud Unida	19	(3)
2016–2018	Agropecuario	43	(2)
2018	Racing de Córdoba	10	(0)
2019	Estudiantes RC	3	(0)
2019	Artigas		
- * Club domestic league appearances and goals

Juan Tejera (born 26 July 1983 in Montevideo) is a retiredUruguayan footballer.

== Career ==
Tejera began his career in Uruguay playing for Liverpool de Montevideo in the Primera División Uruguaya.

In 2010, Tejera joined Olimpo, recently promoted to the Argentine Primera División.
