= Juan Álvez =

Uruguayan footballer (born 1983)

Personal information
- Full name: Juan Daniel Álvez Ortiz
- Date of birth: August 21, 1983 (age 43)
- Place of birth: Montevideo, Uruguay
- Height: 1.68 m (5 ft 6 in)
- Position: Defender

Team information
- Current team: Fénix
- Number: 24

Senior career*
Years	Team	Apps	(Gls)
2003–2008	Montevideo Wanderers	99	(2)
2008–2012	Liverpool	102	(1)
2012–2013	Peñarol	8	(0)
2013–	Fénix	309	(4)
- * Club domestic league appearances and goals as of 8 April 2023

Juan Daniel Álvez Ortíz (born August 21, 1983) is a Uruguayan footballer who plays for Fénix of the Primera Division in Uruguay.
