= Paul Dzeruvs =

Uruguayan footballer (born 1988)

Personal information
- Full name: Paul Michael Dzeruvs Sosa
- Date of birth: 1 November 1988 (age 38)
- Place of birth: Montevideo, Uruguay
- Height: 1.78 m (5 ft 10 in)
- Position: Forward

Youth career
- Rentistas

Senior career*
Years	Team	Apps	(Gls)
2005–2009	Rentistas		
2009–2015	Rampla Juniors	107	(11)
2013	→ Everton (loan)	4	(0)
2015–2016	Deportivo Maldonado	17	(1)
2017–2018	Villa Española	54	(14)
2019	Villa Teresa	11	(0)
2020–2021	Colón FC	14	(4)
- * Club domestic league appearances and goals

Paul Michael Dzeruvs Sosa (born 1 November 1988 in Montevideo), known as Paul Dzeruvs, is a former Uruguayan footballer who played as a forward.

== Career ==
He played for Rampla Juniors in the First division, Uruguay (Goals=32).

=== Teams ===
- (Uruguay) Rentistas 2005–2009
- (Uruguay) Rampla Juniors 2009–2012
- (Chile) Everton 2013
- (Uruguay) Rampla Juniors 2013–2015
- (Uruguay) Colón FC 2020–2021

== Personal life ==
His paternal grandparents were a Frenchman and a German woman with Lithuanian citizenship who came to South America running away from the World War II.
