= Sebastián Fuentes =

Uruguayan footballer (born 1987)

Personal information
- Full name: Pablo Sebastián Fuentes Fraga
- Date of birth: 18 January 1987 (age 39)
- Place of birth: Montevideo, Uruguay
- Height: 1.84 m (6 ft 1/2 in)
- Position: Goalkeeper

Team information
- Current team: Defensor Sporting
- Number: 12

Youth career
- Santa Rosa de Shangrilá
- Defensor Sporting
- –2009: Miramar Misiones
- 2009–2010: Nacional B

Senior career*
Years	Team	Apps	(Gls)
2010–2011	Puntarenas	1	(0)
2011	Sud América		
2011–2012	Juventud	24	(0)
2012–2013	Central Español	21	(0)
2013	Boston River		
2013–2014	Técnico Universitario		
2014–2016	Cerro	52	(0)
2016	América de Cali	11	(0)
2017	Club Guaraní	1	(0)
2017–2018	Sud América	5	(0)
2018–2019	Progreso	13	(0)
2019–	Defensor Sporting	3	(0)
Medal record
América de Cali
Winner	Categoría Primera B	2016
- * Club domestic league appearances and goals as of 8 April 2019

Pablo Sebastián Fuentes Fraga (born January 19, 1987, in Montevideo) is a Uruguayan footballer currently playing as a goalkeeper for Defensor Sporting of the Uruguayan Primera División.

== Career statistics ==
=== Club ===
As of 18 July 2018.

Club	Season	League			Cup		Continental		Other		Total	
Club	Season	Division	Apps	Goals	Apps	Goals	Apps	Goals	Apps	Goals	Apps	Goals
Puntarenas	2010–11	Liga FPD	1	0	0	0	–		0	0	1	0
Juventud	2011–12	Uruguayan Segunda División	24	0	0	0	–		0	0	24	0
Central Español	2012–13	Uruguayan Primera División	8	0	0	0	–		0	0	8	0
Central Español	2013–14	Uruguayan Segunda División	13	0	0	0	–		0	0	13	0
Central Español	Total		21	0	0	0	0	0	0	0	21	0
C.A. Cerro	2014–15	Uruguayan Primera División	22	0	0	0	–		0	0	22	0
C.A. Cerro	2015–16	Uruguayan Primera División	30	0	0	0	–		0	0	30	0
C.A. Cerro	Total		52	0	0	0	0	0	0	0	52	0
América de Cali	2016	Categoría Primera B	11	0	1 (Note: Appearances in the Copa Colombia)	0	–		0	0	12	0
Club Guaraní	2017	Paraguayan Primera División	1	0	0	0	0	0	0	0	1	0
Sud América	2017	Uruguayan Primera División	5	0	0	0	–		0	0	5	0
Progreso	2018	Uruguayan Primera División	0	0	0	0	–		0	0	0	0
Career total			115	0	1	0	0	0	0	0	116	0
