= Martín Galain =

Uruguayan footballer (born 1989)

Víctor Martín Galain Pécora (born March 2, 1989, in Florida, Uruguay) is an Uruguayan footballer currently playing for El Tanque Sisley.

Galain began playing football in Club Nacional de Football's youth system, and was called into the senior side in July 2008.

== Teams ==
- (Uruguay) Nacional 2008-2010
- (Uruguay) Tacuarembó FC 2010-2011
- (Uruguay) El Tanque Sisley 2011-2012
- (Colombia) La Equidad 2013
- (Uruguay) El Tanque Sisley 2014–present

== Titles ==
- (Uruguay) Nacional 2008/09 (Uruguayan Primera División Championship), 2010 (Copa Bimbo)
