= Alejandro Lembo =

Uruguayan footballer (born 1978)

Personal information
- Full name: Daniel Alejandro Lembo Bentancor
- Date of birth: 15 February 1978 (age 48)
- Place of birth: Montevideo, Uruguay
- Height: 1.88 m (6 ft 2 in)
- Position: Centre back

Senior career*
Years	Team	Apps	(Gls)
1997–1999	Bella Vista	56	(5)
2000	Parma	0	(0)
2000–2003	Nacional	94	(9)
2003–2007	Betis	46	(1)
2007–2008	Danubio	18	(0)
2008–2009	Aris	19	(1)
2009–2011	Nacional	53	(2)
2011–2012	Belgrano	28	(0)
2012–2013	Nacional	16	(0)
Total		230	(18)

International career
1999–2004	Uruguay	39	(2)
- * Club domestic league appearances and goals

Daniel Alejandro Lembo Bentancor (born 15 February 1978) is a Uruguayan former professional footballer who played mainly as a central defender.

== Club career ==
Born in the Uruguayan capital Montevideo, Lembo started his career with C.A. Bella Vista, playing three years with the team. In July 2000 he signed for Serie A's Parma AC, but left without playing a single game, returning to his country and joining Club Nacional de Football, for which he scored nine goals in the Primera División en route to winning three consecutive national championships.

Lembo moved to Spain's Real Betis for the 2003–04 season, and went on to play in 59 official matches netting once, in a 1–0 La Liga home win over Celta de Vigo on 31 January 2004. Although playing a major role in the Andalusia club's Copa del Rey run in the 2004–05 campaign, he was dropped for the final, and would only appear in four league matches in the next two years combined, mainly due to injuries.

Lembo returned to his homeland and hometown in 2007–08, signing with Danubio F.C. but, the following season, on 26 June 2008, he penned a two-year contract with Aris from Greece.

== International career ==
Lembo gained 39 caps for Uruguay, making his debut on 17 June 1999 in a 3–2 friendly win with Paraguay in Ciudad del Este, and took part in that year's Copa América as the nation finished second to Brazil, scoring one of his two international goals in the 1–1 semifinal match against Chile (penalty shootout win).

Lembo was part of Uruguay's squad at the 2002 FIFA World Cup, playing the full 90 minutes in the draws against France and Senegal.

== Honours ==
Nacional

- Uruguayan Primera División: 2001, 2002, 2010–11

Betis

- Copa del Rey: 2004–05

Uruguay

- Copa América: runner-up 1999
