= Lutz Wagner =

German association football referee

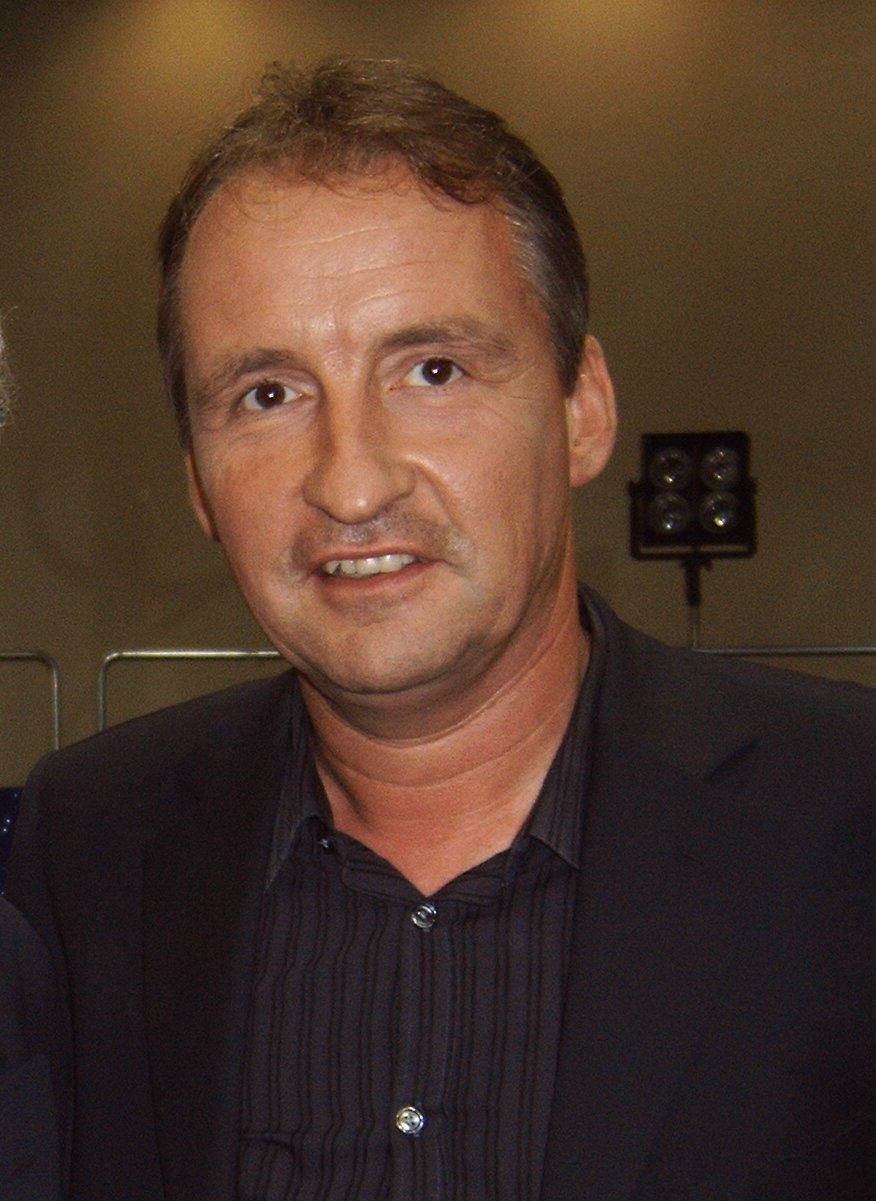
Lutz Wagner

Lutz Wagner (born May 27, 1963) is a former German football referee. He now serves as a member of the Amateurs Referee Committee in the German Football Association.

== Career ==
Wagner began as a referee for SV 07 Kriftel in 1991, before moving to the 2. Bundesliga in 1992 and the Bundesliga in 1994. With 197 Bundesliga games and more than 100 2. Bundelisga games, Wagner ranks as one of the Bundesliga's most utilized referees. In 2004, he refereed in the Korean K League, heading the championship finals in 2006.

In addition to his work as a DFB referee, he was also the association instructor of the Hessian Football Association and was responsible for training incoming referees. In July 2010, he handed over this position to the former DFB referee Ralf Viktora. At the end of the 2009/10 season, Lutz Wagner ended his career as a Bundesliga referee after reaching the age limit. He worked as a referee observer during the 2010/2011 season. From May 2010 to March 2013, he was the coordinator for rule interpretation in the referee committee of the German Football Association. In October 2013, he participated in efforts led by DFB-Bundestag to restructure the refereeing system. Subsequently, Wagner took over as an instructor in the amateurs referee committee, which is responsible for the women's national leagues, the junior national leagues, and cup competitions including the DFB country cup tournaments. Its task is to communicate the rule changes and the interpretation of the rules to the teaching supervisors in the regional associations.

During the European Championship in 2021, Wagner worked as a refereeing analyst for Das Erste.

== Personal life ==
In 1992, Wagner began to use his experience as a referee to become speaker. He has presented in a variety of companies and non-sports-related associations since 2006. He was elected "Speaker of the year" in 2007 by the PMI Chapter in Berlin and Brandenburg.

Wagner was a tolerance ambassador in the Ballance Hessen project. He supports the German Football Association as a fair play ambassador, and he is an ambassador of tolerance for the Hessian Football Association. He is also a sponsor of the Leberecht Foundation and an ambassador for the non-profit organization Bildung-Kickt.

Wagner is married to his wife Petra and has a daughter.
