= Gustavo Varela (footballer, born 1978) =

Uruguayan footballer (born 1978)

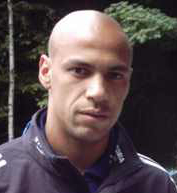

Personal information
- Full name: Gustavo Antonio Varela Rodríguez
- Date of birth: 14 May 1978 (age 48)
- Place of birth: Montevideo, Uruguay
- Height: 1.74 m (5 ft 9 in)
- Position: Winger

Senior career*
Years	Team	Apps	(Gls)
1998–2002	Nacional	118	(28)
2002–2009	Schalke 04	82	(8)
2003	Schalke 04 II	4	(2)
2009–2011	Nacional	20	(9)
2010–2011	→ Quilmes (loan)	21	(0)
2011–2012	Cerro	21	(1)
2013–2014	Cerro	22	(0)
Total		288	(48)

International career
2000–2006	Uruguay	24	(0)
- * Club domestic league appearances and goals

Gustavo Antonio Varela Rodríguez (born 14 May 1978) is a Uruguayan former footballer. He was a versatile right sided player who also could "be played as a lone striker, behind the front two" or at the heart of midfield.

== Career ==
Varela started his career in Nacional in Uruguay, and played between 2002 and 2008 for FC Schalke 04 in Germany. After his contract with Schalke 04 expired in January 2009, Varela returned to Nacional.

Varela transferred to Argentina to play for recently promoted Quilmes in the 2010–11 Argentine Primera División season.

== International career ==
Varela made 24 appearances for the Uruguay national football team, and was a participant at the 2002 FIFA World Cup.

== Honours ==
Schalke 04

- UEFA Intertoto Cup: 2003
- DFB-Ligapokal: 2005
