= Gonzalo Godoy =

Uruguayan footballer (born 1988)

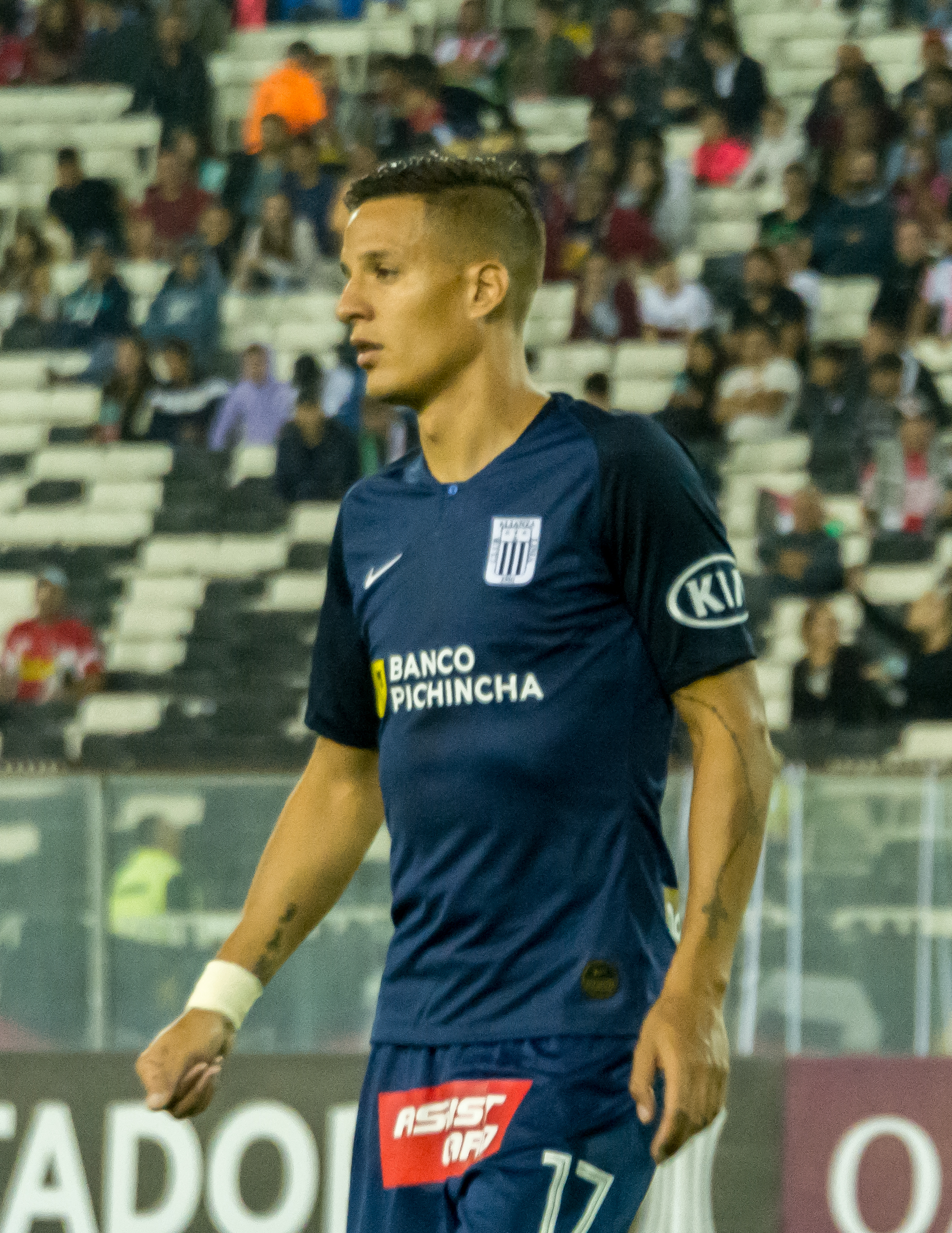

Personal information
- Full name: Gonzalo Damián Godoy Silva
- Date of birth: 17 January 1988 (age 38)
- Place of birth: Montevideo, Uruguay
- Height: 1.86 m (6 ft 1 in)
- Positions: Centre back; full-back

Team information
- Current team: Villa Española

Youth career
- –2007: Cerro

Senior career*
Years	Team	Apps	(Gls)
2008–2009	Cerro	28	(0)
2009–2011	Nacional	26	(0)
2012	→ Cerro (loan)	3	(0)
2012–2014	Liverpool	27	(1)
2014–2015	Ñublense	30	(0)
2015	Yeni Malatyaspor	24	(2)
2016	Sud América	10	(0)
2017–2019	Alianza Lima	101	(6)
2020	The Strongest	10	(0)
2021	Mannucci	25	(2)
2022	Rentistas	29	(2)
2023	Sud América	29	(0)
2024–	Villa Española		
- * Club domestic league appearances and goals as of 3 December 2023

Gonzalo Damián Godoy Silva (Note: In this Spanish name, the first or paternal surname is Godoy and the second or maternal family name is Silva.) (born 17 January 1988), known as Gonzalo Godoy, is a Uruguayan footballer who plays as a centre back or full-back for Villa Española.
