= Ernesto Goñi =

Uruguayan footballer (born 1985)

Personal information
- Full name: Ernesto Goñi Ameijenda
- Date of birth: 13 January 1985 (age 41)
- Place of birth: Montevideo, Uruguay
- Height: 1.85 m (6 ft 1 in)
- Position: Left back

Youth career
- 2005–2007: Defensor Sporting

Senior career*
Years	Team	Apps	(Gls)
2007–2009	Racing Montevideo	58	(4)
2010	→ Nacional (loan)	16	(1)
2011–2013	Quilmes	41	(1)
2013–2015	Estudiantes	17	(1)
2015	Tigre	23	(1)
2016	Almería	2	(0)
2016–2017	Racing Montevideo	4	(0)
2017	Torque	25	(5)
2018	Defensor Sporting	22	(5)
2019	Danubio	29	(1)
2020–2021	Liverpool Montevideo	4	(0)
- * Club domestic league appearances and goals

Ernesto Goñi Ameijenda (born 13 January 1985) is an Uruguayan former footballer who played as a left back. His nickname is "Teto", an abbreviation of his name.

== Club career ==
Goñi was born in Montevideo. A Defensor Sporting youth graduate, he made his senior debut with Racing Club de Montevideo in 2005. In August of that year, he went on a trial at Italy's Sambenedettese Calcio, but nothing came of it.

On 8 January 2010 Goñi moved to Club Nacional de Football on loan. He returned to his parent club in January 2011, and in July of that year, moved abroad after agreeing to a deal with Argentine Primera B Nacional side Quilmes Atlético Club.

After achieving promotion to Primera División during his first season and being a regular starter afterwards, Goñi moved to Estudiantes de La Plata on 8 July 2013. After being sparingly used, he rescinded his link and moved to fellow league team Club Atlético Tigre on 28 January 2015.

On 8 January 2016 Goñi signed for UD Almería in Segunda División.

== Honours ==
Racing Montevideo

- Segunda División Uruguay: 2007–08

Nacional

- Copa Bimbo: 2010
