= Raúl Ferro =

Uruguayan footballer (born 1983)

Personal information
- Full name: Raúl Fredy Ferro Olivera
- Date of birth: 13 January 1983 (age 43)
- Place of birth: Montevideo, Uruguay
- Height: 1.78 m (5 ft 10 in)
- Position: Midfielder

Senior career*
Years	Team	Apps	(Gls)
2006–2009	Danubio	50	(1)
2009–2010	Nacional	44	(1)
2010–2011	Querétaro	15	(0)
2011	→ Veracruz (loan)	15	(2)
2012	Dorados	6	(0)
2012–2013	Atlético de Rafaela	28	(0)
2013–2014	Liverpool Montevideo	23	(0)
2014–2019	Fénix	144	(5)
- * Club domestic league appearances and goals as of 18:06, 4 January 2020 (UTC)

Raúl Fredy Ferro Olivera (born 13 January 1983) is a Uruguayan retired footballer.

== Career ==
Ferro joined Centro Atlético Fénix in the summer of 2014. He left the club again at the end of 2019. Left without a club since the break with Fénix, Ferro announced his retirement on 2 January 2020.

== Honours ==
Danubio

- Uruguayan Primera División (1): 2006–07
