= Rodrigo Muñoz =

Uruguayan - Paraguayan footballer (born 1982)

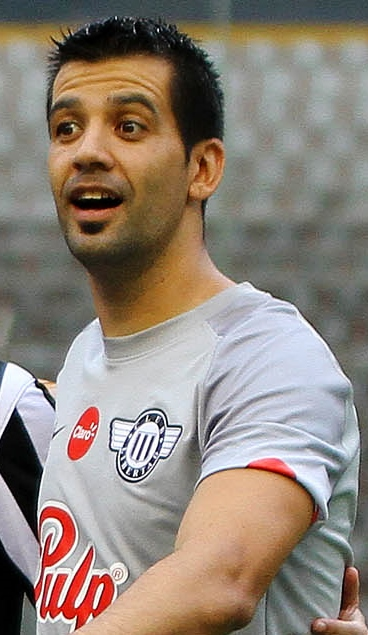

Personal information
- Full name: Rodrigo Martín Muñoz Salomón
- Date of birth: 22 January 1982 (age 44)
- Place of birth: Montevideo, Uruguay
- Height: 1.81 m (5 ft 11 in)
- Position: Goalkeeper

Youth career
- –2000: Cerro

Senior career*
| Years | Team | Apps | (Gls) |
| 2000–2008 | Cerro | 72 | (4) |
| 2009–2011 | Nacional | 67 | (0) |
| 2012–2018 | Libertad | 241 | (1) |
| 2019–2022 | Cerro Porteño | 34 | (0) |
| 2023 | Guarani | 36 | (0) |

International career
| 1999 | Uruguay U17 | 2 | (0) |
| 2014 | Uruguay | 0 | (0) |
- * Club domestic league appearances and goals

Rodrigo Martín Muñoz Salomón (Spanish pronunciation: [roˈðɾiɣo muˈɲos]; born 22 January 1982) is a Uruguayan former footballer who played as a goalkeeper.

== Club career ==
=== Cerro ===
Muñoz played for Cerro from 2002 to 2008, scoring 4 goals.

=== Nacional ===
In 2009, he was transferred to Club Nacional de Football, making his debut in a 2–1 home win against Universidad San Martín de Porres in the 2009 Copa Libertadores on February 12, 2009. With Nacional he won the Uruguayan championship twice (2009 & 2011).

=== Libertad ===
In January 2012, he signed a new deal with the Paraguayan side Libertad.

== International career ==
On 18 May 2011 he was reserved to play a friendly match against Germany in Sinsheim. Muñoz was named in Uruguay's provisional squad for Copa América Centenario but was cut from the final squad.

== Honours ==
Nacional

- Uruguayan Primera División (2): 2008–09, 2010-11
