= Derlis Florentín =

Paraguayan footballer (1984-2010)

Personal information
- Full name: Derlis Javier Florentín Noguera
- Date of birth: 9 January 1984
- Place of birth: Caacupé, Paraguay
- Date of death: 28 March 2010 (aged 26)
- Place of death: Eusebio Ayala, Paraguay
- Height: 1.74 m (5 ft 9 in)
- Position: Striker

Senior career*
Years	Team	Apps	(Gls)
2001–2002	Deportivo Humaitá		
2003	Gimnasia	3	(0)
2004	Sportivo Luqueño		
2005	Mito HollyHock	17	(8)
2005	Consadole Sapporo	19	(1)
2006	Sportivo Luqueño		
2006	Barcelona		
2007	Palmeiras		
2007	Nacional		
2008	Danubio		
2008	Alianza Lima	8	(1)
2009	Barcelona	?	(1)
2009	Nacional	2	(0)
2010	Atenas	2	(1)

International career
2001	Paraguay U–17		
2003	Paraguay U–20		
- * Club domestic league appearances and goals

Derlis Javier Florentín Noguera (9 January 1984 – 28 March 2010) was a Paraguayan football striker.

== Career ==
Florentín started his career with Humaitá.

== International career ==
He was part of the U17 and U20 Paraguay national football teams that won the Milk Cup competition in 2001 and 2003.

== Club statistics ==
Club performance			League		Cup		Total	
Season	Club	League	Apps	Goals	Apps	Goals	Apps	Goals
Japan			League		Emperor's Cup		Total	
2005	Mito HollyHock	J2 League	17	8	0	0	17	8
2005	Consadole Sapporo	J2 League	19	1	0	0	19	1
Country	Japan		36	9	0	0	36	9
Total			36	9	0	0	36	9

== Death ==
Florentín died in a car accident at midnight when his car crashed into another on Cordillera Highway, 54 kilometers away from Asunción. He was taken to a nearby hospital, but died shortly after. His companion, Aléxis Afonso, also died in the accident.

== Titles ==
- Milk Cup: 2001, 2003 (with Paraguay)
