= Rubén Planchón =

Uruguayan footballer (born 1982)

Rubén Carlos Planchón Faureau (born August 4, 1982 in Dolores), commonly known as Rubén Planchón, is a Uruguayan footballer who plays as a defender for C.A. Rentistas in the Uruguayan Primera División.

== Teams ==
- (Uruguay) Villa Española 2003
- (Uruguay) Plaza Colonia 2004
- (Uruguay) Atenas 2005
- (Uruguay) Cerro 2005-2006
- (Uruguay) Central Español 2006-2007
- (Uruguay) Juventud 2008-2009
- (Uruguay) Cerrito 2009-2010
- (Brazil) Juventude 2010
- (Uruguay) Rentistas 2011
- (Uruguay) Narnia FC 2022 - Present

== Honours ==
Rentistas

- Uruguayan Segunda División: 2010-11
