= Maximiliano Calzada =

Uruguayan footballer (born 1990)

Personal information
- Full name: Maximiliano Matías Calzada Fuentes
- Date of birth: 21 April 1990 (age 36)
- Place of birth: Santa Lucía, Uruguay
- Height: 1.70 m (5 ft 7 in)
- Position: Defensive midfielder

Team information
- Current team: River Plate
- Number: 7

Youth career
- –2008: Nacional

Senior career*
Years	Team	Apps	(Gls)
2009–2015	Nacional	93	(1)
2015–2016	Banfield	14	(1)
2016	Defensa y Justicia	4	(0)
2016–2017	Arsenal de Sarandí	16	(0)
2018–2021	River Plate	84	(2)

International career
2009	Uruguay U-20	9	(0)
2012	Uruguay Olympic	2	(0)
- * Club domestic league appearances and goals as of 23:18, 17 September 2019 (UTC)

Maximiliano Matías Calzada Fuentes (born 21 April 1990 in Santa Lucía) is a Uruguayan footballer who plays for Uruguayan River Plate as a defensive midfielder.

== International career ==
Calzada was part of Uruguay's under-20 squad at the 2009 South American Youth Championship and at 2009 FIFA U-20 World Cup.

He was called up by Óscar Tabárez for the 2012 Summer Olympics being held in London, Great Britain, and played in two games.

== Titles ==
Nacional

- Uruguayan Primera División (3): 2008–09, 2010–11, 2011–12
