= Ángel Morales =

Argentine footballer

Personal information
- Full name: Ángel Alejandro Morales Santos
- Date of birth: 14 June 1975 (age 51)
- Place of birth: Buenos Aires, Argentina
- Height: 1.75 m (5 ft 9 in)
- Position: Attacking midfielder

Senior career*
Years	Team	Apps	(Gls)
1994–1995	Independiente	30	(3)
1995	Platense	14	(1)
1996–1997	Independiente	36	(5)
1997	Sampdoria	9	(1)
1998	Mérida	2	(0)
1999	Racing Club	32	(7)
1999–2002	Cruz Azul	107	(33)
2002–2004	Veracruz	73	(17)
2004–2005	Racing Club	19	(0)
2006	Dorados Sinaloa	15	(0)
2006–2007	Banfield	19	(0)
2007–2008	Olimpo	28	(1)
2008–2010	Nacional	29	(3)
2010–2011	Huracán	22	(0)
Total		435	(71)
- * Club domestic league appearances and goals

Ángel Alejandro Morales Santos (born 14 June 1975), nicknamed Matute, is an Argentine retired footballer who played as an attacking midfielder.

== Club career ==
Morales was born in Buenos Aires. In his extensive professional career, he represented six clubs in his country, including both Avellaneda giants, Club Atlético Independiente and Racing Club, starting his career at the former and having two spells with both.

His first abroad experience came in June 1997, at the age of 22, as he played in Italy for U.C. Sampdoria for a few months, scoring against Juventus FC. In the ensuing transfer window, he signed with CP Mérida in Spain, but collected almost no La Liga appearances in a relegation-ending season.

After returning to his country, with Racing, Morales moved abroad again, playing for Mexican sides Cruz Azul, Tiburones Rojos de Veracruz and Dorados de Sinaloa. At 33, he signed with Uruguay's Club Nacional de Football and, two years later, in 2010, returned to his country and joined Club Atlético Huracán.

== Personal life ==
Morales' older brother, Carlos, was also a footballer. Also a midfielder, he represented Paraguay internationally, having been born in the country.
