= José Granda (footballer, born 1984) =

Ecuadorian footballer

Personal information
- Full name: José Eduardo Granda Vicuña
- Date of birth: 18 March 1984 (age 42)
- Place of birth: Cuenca, Azuay, Ecuador
- Position: Midfielder

Team information
- Current team: Deportivo Cuenca
- Number: 18

Youth career
- 2000–2002: Deportivo Cuenca

Senior career*
| Years | Team | Apps | (Gls) |
| 2003– | Deportivo Cuenca | 12 | (0) |
| 2005–2007 | → LDU Cuenca (loan) | 17 | (0) |
| 2008 | → Técnico Universitario (loan) | 27 | (4) |
- * Club domestic league appearances and goals as of 13 July 2009

José Eduardo Granda Vicuña (born March 18, 1984) is an Ecuadorian footballer currently playing for Deportivo Cuenca.

== Club career ==
Granda started his professional career at Deportivo Cuenca when he was 16. He rarely got to play with the first team by the end of the season as he only got two appearances. He was loaned out to LDU Cuenca for the next season, where he got more chances of regular playing. After two seasons with Liga de Cuenca, he was again loaned out to Técnico Universitario for one season. He made 27 appearances for Técnico where he impressed Deportivo Cuenca at the end of the season. Granda came back to Deportivo Cuenca, this time to play as a starter. In the Copa Libertadores 2009, he was an important player for Cuenca and was named Man of the Match in their 4–0 win against Guaraní.
