= Christian Núñez =

Uruguayan footballer (born 1982)

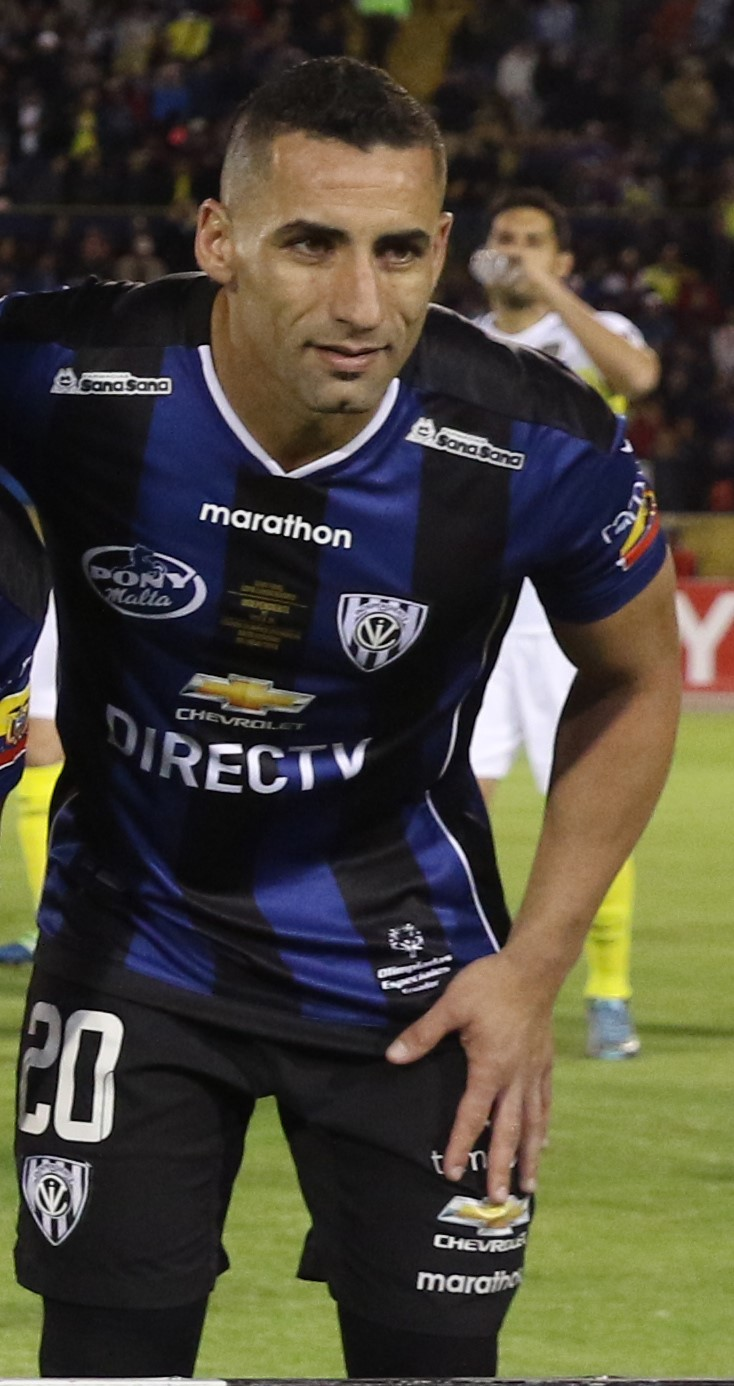

Personal information
- Full name: Christian Washington Núñez Medina
- Date of birth: 24 September 1982 (age 44)
- Place of birth: Montevideo, Uruguay
- Height: 1.74 m (5 ft 9 in)
- Position: Right back

Senior career*
| Years | Team | Apps | (Gls) |
| 2000–2004 | Huracán Buceo | | |
| 2004–2008 | Fénix | | |
| 2008–2009 | Cerro | | |
| 2009–2013 | Nacional | 121 | (5) |
| 2013–2014 | Independiente | 4 | (0) |
| 2014–2017 | Independiente del Valle | 154 | (5) |
| 2018 | Cerro | 31 | (1) |
| 2019 | Liverpool Montevideo | 15 | (0) |
| 2021 | Cerro | 30 | (1) |
| 2022 | Sud América | 25 | (0) |
| 2023 | Juventud Italiana | | |
- * Club domestic league appearances and goals

Christian Washington Núñez Medina (born 24 September 1982) is a Uruguayan former footballer who played as a right back. His nickname is "Pichón".

== Honours ==
=== Cerro ===
- Liguilla Pre-Libertadores de América: Champion 2009

=== Nacional ===
- Torneo Apertura: Champion 2009 and 2011
- Torneo Clausura: Champion 2011
- Campeonato Uruguayo: Champion 2010-2011 and 2011-2012.
- Copa Libertadores Runner Up (1): 2016
