= Deportivo Coreano =

Argentine football club

Club Deportivo Coreano
- Full name: Club Deportivo Coreano
- Nickname: "El Oriental" "Asiático"
- Founded: 11th of March, 2005
- Dissolved: 2018 (3 years ago)
- Ground: Club Deportivo Coreano, Lobos, Buenos Aires, Argentina
- Capacity: 4,000
- League: Liga Lobense De Futbol
Home colours	Away colours

Club Deportivo Coreano was an amateur Argentinian football club based in Lobos, Buenos Aires which played at the Liga Lobense de Fútbol up until 2018.

The club was founded with the aim of promoting cultural exchange between the Argentine and Korean republics, using football as a universal language.
