= Fabián Pumar =

Uruguayan footballer (born 1976)

Personal information
- Full name: Fabián Diego Pumar Bravo
- Date of birth: 14 February 1976 (age 50)
- Place of birth: Montevideo, Uruguay
- Height: 1.85 m (6 ft 1 in)
- Position: Defender

Senior career*
Years	Team	Apps	(Gls)
1997–2002	Bella Vista	-	(-)
2001	Shanghai Zhongyuan	-	(-)
2002	Racing Club de Avellaneda	12	(0)
2003	Universitario	-	(-)
2003–2004	Argentinos Juniors	20	(0)
2004–2005	Fénix	-	(-)
2005–2006	Comunicaciones	-	(-)
2006–2009	Fénix	-	(-)
2009–2010	Danubio	16	(0)
2010–2011	Cerro	5	(0)
- * Club domestic league appearances and goals as of May 2008

Fabián Diego Pumar Bravo (born 14 February 1976 in Montevideo) is a Uruguayan football defender who played for Bella Vista, Fénix and Cerro of Uruguay; Racing Club de Avellaneda of Argentina and Universitario of Peru.

== Honours ==
- Uruguay
  - 1999 Copa América: 2nd place
