= Sergio Blanco =

Uruguayan footballer (born 1981)

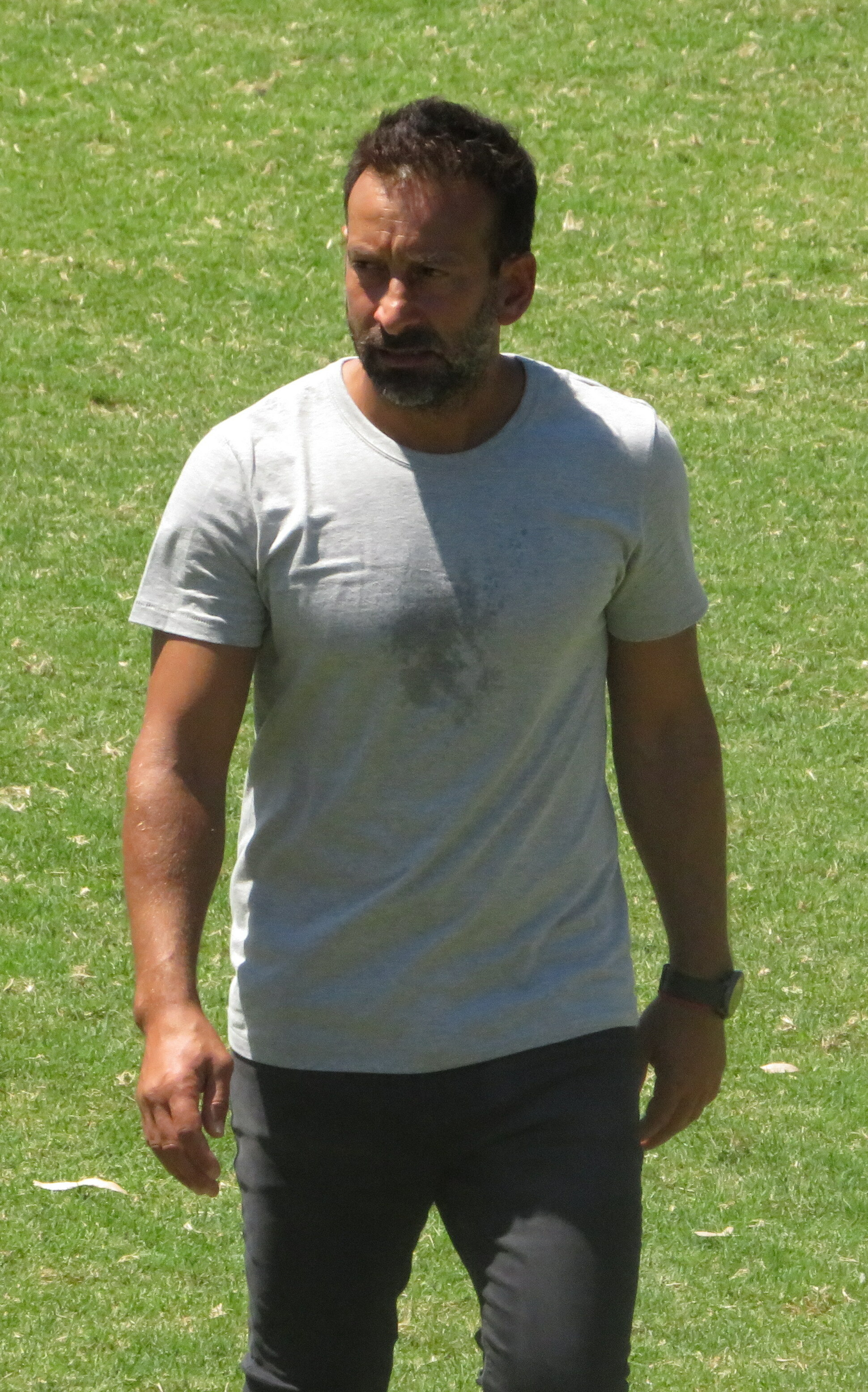
- Blanco in 2023

Personal information
- Full name: Sergio Rubén Blanco Soto
- Date of birth: 25 November 1981 (age 44)
- Place of birth: Montevideo, Uruguay
- Height: 1.71 m (5 ft 7 in)
- Position: Striker

Team information
- Current team: Juventud de Las Piedras (manager)

Youth career
- Montevideo Wanderers

Senior career*
Years	Team	Apps	(Gls)
2000–2006	Montevideo Wanderers	76	(45)
2003	→ Club América (loan)	8	(3)
2004	→ San Luis (loan)	6	(5)
2006	→ Dorados (loan)	10	(0)
2007	Shanghai Shenhua	18	(5)
2008–2010	Nacional	46	(17)
2010–2011	Querétaro	16	(8)
2011–2012	Necaxa	22	(3)
2012	→ Montevideo Wanderers (loan)	13	(5)
2012–2013	Patronato	23	(4)
2013–2014	Montevideo Wanderers	26	(18)
2014–2015	Sporting Cristal	59	(19)
2016–2019	Montevideo Wanderers	88	(17)
2019–2020	Torque	18	(1)
2021	Montevideo Wanderers	8	(1)

International career
2003–2006	Uruguay	4	(1)

Managerial career
- 2022: Montevideo Wanderers (youth)
- 2022: Montevideo Wanderers (interim)
- 2022–2023: Montevideo Wanderers
- 2024–2025: Celaya
- 2026–: Juventud de Las Piedras
- * Club domestic league appearances and goals

Sergio Rubén Blanco Soto (born 25 November 1981) is a Uruguayan football manager and former player who played as a striker. He is the current manager of Juventud de Las Piedras.

== International career ==
Blanco has represented Uruguay in 4 international appearances and has scored 1 goal.
