= Diego Perrone =

Uruguayan footballer (born 1979)

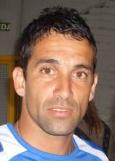

Personal information
- Full name: Diego Rafael Perrone Vienes
- Date of birth: 17 November 1979 (age 46)
- Place of birth: Montevideo, Uruguay
- Height: 1.68 m (5 ft 6 in)
- Position: Striker

Senior career*
Years	Team	Apps	(Gls)
1996–2003	Danubio	163	(49)
2003	Atlas	16	(5)
2003–2004	León	24	(6)
2004	Danubio	14	(2)
2004–2005	Lugano	16	(6)
2005	Catania	1	(0)
2006	Levadiakos	6	(0)
2006	Nacional	12	(2)
2007	Olimpia Asunción	8	(0)
2007–2008	Nacional	16	(0)
2009	Danubio	23	(6)
2009	Central Español	13	(2)
2010–2012	Danubio	65	(14)

International career^{‡}
2003	Uruguay	5	(2)
- * Club domestic league appearances and goals as of March 19, 2013 ‡ National team caps and goals as of 2003

Diego Rafael Perrone Vienes (born 17 November 1979 in Montevideo) is a retired Uruguayan footballer who played as a striker. He is the goalscorer leader of Danubio in all its history with 72 goals.

== Career ==
Perrone began his career playing with his home team Danubio F.C., making his debut in 1996. He has gone through many clubs around the world including Atlas and León in Mexico, Lugano in Switzerland, Catania in Italy, Levadiakos in Greece, and finally Olimpia Asunción in Paraguay.

He is recognized (especially by the Danubio supporters) for scoring the goal via "taco" in the Final of the 2004 Uruguayan Primera División, where Danubio was consecrated champion after winning Nacional 1-0 that afternoon at the Jardines Del Hipódromo.

== Goalscoring record ==
On 4 December 2011, thanks to the last of the three goals scored against Bella Vista, Perrone reached Ruben "Polillita" da Silva as top scorer in the history of the Danubio. The next game, played on February 18, 2012 (first round of Clausura) he scored in the 1-1 draw with Wanderers, adding its 72 goal in the club, and establishing himself as the leading scorer of Danubio F.C. in all its history.

== Honours ==
Danubio

- Uruguayan Primera División: 2004

Nacional

- Liguilla: 2008
