= Rubén Olivera =

Uruguayan footballer (born 1983)

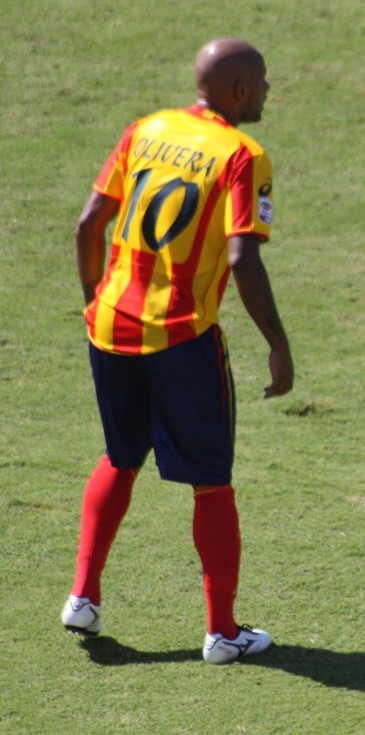
- Olivera with Lecce in 2012

Personal information
- Full name: Rubén Ariel Olivera da Rosa
- Date of birth: 4 May 1983 (age 43)
- Place of birth: Montevideo, Uruguay
- Height: 1.84 m (6 ft 1/2 in)
- Position: Attacking midfielder

Senior career*
Years	Team	Apps	(Gls)
2001–2002	Danubio	37	(21)
2003–2009	Juventus	22	(4)
2004	→ Atlético Madrid (loan)	2	(0)
2006–2007	→ Sampdoria (loan)	20	(0)
2008	→ Peñarol (loan)	14	(5)
2008–2009	→ Genoa (loan)	20	(4)
2009–2010	Peñarol	17	(0)
2010–2012	Lecce	43	(4)
2012–2014	Fiorentina	14	(0)
2013	→ Genoa (loan)	5	(0)
2014	Brescia	32	(0)
2015–2016	Latina	38	(6)
2017	LDU Quito	12	(0)
2017–2018	Latina	13	(2)
2018–2019	Racing Aprilia	48	(11)
2019–2020	Ostiamare	8	(2)
2020–2021	Racing Aprilia	15	(5)

International career
2001–2005	Uruguay	18	(0)

Managerial career
- 2022: Racing Aprilia
- * Club domestic league appearances and goals

Rubén Ariel Olivera da Rosa (born 4 May 1983) is a Uruguayan former footballer who played as a midfielder, and current coach.

A versatile player, he Was capable of playing anywhere in midfield and during his career he was deployed as a left or right winger, as a central midfielder, as an attacking midfielder, and even as a forward. He was nicknamed El Pollo ("the chicken," in Spanish).

== Playing career ==
Olivera began his career in Danubio, in 2001, and after making good performances for Danubio, was later signed by Juventus in 2002. He made his Serie A debut in 2–1 win to AS Roma, on 19 April 2003, as Juventus won the title that season, under manager Marcello Lippi.

He was loaned to Atlético Madrid during the second half of the 2003–04 season, after he did not make any appearances for the club. He returned from his loan in 2004, but was also used scarcely under manager Fabio Capello, in particular during the 2005–06 season. In 2007, while playing for Sampdoria on loan, he was banned for 5 matches for punching an opponent in the ribs, and also for kicking him in the groin.

Following his time on loan with Sampdoria, Olivera returned to Juventus in 2007, although he was loaned out again to Urugyan side Peñarol in 2008. In 2008, he signed permanently with Genoa on a year contract. For the 2009–10 season, he went back to Uruguay on loan with Peñarol. On 1 July 2010, he returned to Italy, signing a 3-year contract with Lecce.

In 2012, he was signed by Fiorentina, and he remained at the club for a season and a half.

On 30 January 2014, Olivera joined Serie B side Brescia on an 18-month deal.

In January 2015 he moved to Latina. He played 3 games and scored a goal for the team before an injury put an end to his season in April 2015. In 2015-16 he scored 5 goals in 33 appearances in Serie B. Olivera then joined LDU Quito on 1 January 2017. However, he returned to Latina in Italy in September 2017 who now was playing in Serie D. In February 2018, he was also appointed technical director of Latina. He left Latina in the summer 2018 and said to the medias, that his career was over. However, his former Latina teammate, Daniele Corvia, convinced him to join fellow league club, Aprilia Racing, which he also did on 16 July 2018.

In December 2019, 36-year old Olivera joined Ostiamare. He moved back to Aprilia in June 2020, but announced his retirement in May 2021 after being diagnosed with a heart condition.

== International career ==
Olivera made 18 appearances for Uruguay between 2001 and 2005, and he represented his country at the 2001 Copa América under manager Daniel Passarella, as Uruguay were eliminated in the semi-finals, finishing the tournament in fourth place.

== Coaching career ==
On 3 June 2022, Racing Aprilia announced to have hired Olivera as their new head coach. He was however sacked just two months later, on 19 August, a few weeks before the start of the 2022–23 Serie D season.

== Honours ==
Juventus

- Serie A: 2002–03
- Italian Super Cup: 2003
