= Óscar Javier Morales =

Uruguayan footballer (born 1975)

Personal information
- Full name: Óscar Javier Morales Albornoz
- Date of birth: March 29, 1975 (age 51)
- Place of birth: Montevideo, Uruguay
- Height: 1.69 m (5 ft 6 1/2 in)
- Position: Defensive midfielder

Senior career*
Years	Team	Apps	(Gls)
1996–1998	Cerro	43	(1)
1999–2010	Nacional Montevideo	269	(10)
2005–2006	→ Valladolid (loan)	30	(0)
2006–2007	→ Málaga (loan)	11	(0)
2010	Quilmes	4	(0)
2011–2012	Cerro	43	(2)
2013	Miramar Misiones	0	(0)
2013–2014	Villa Teresa	13	(0)

International career
2002–2005	Uruguay	2	(0)
- * Club domestic league appearances and goals as of 31 December 2013 (UTC)

Óscar Javier "Ó.J." Morales Albornoz (born 29 March 1975 in Montevideo) is an Uruguayan former footballer who played as a defensive midfielder.

== Football career ==
After playing in his native country with C.A. Cerro and Club Nacional de Football, Morales had two Spanish second division loan stints with Real Valladolid and Málaga CF, subsequently returning in July 2007 to Nacional.

In 2010, after more than 300 official games for his main club, the 35-year-old joined Quilmes Atlético Club, recently promoted to the top flight in Argentina. The following year, he returned to his first professional team Cerro.

== Honours ==
Honour	Club	Country	Year
Uruguayan League	Nacional	Uruguay	2000
Uruguayan League	Nacional	Uruguay	2001
Uruguayan League	Nacional	Uruguay	2002
Uruguayan League	Nacional	Uruguay	2005
Uruguayan League	Nacional	Uruguay	2008–09
