= 2008–09 Club Nacional de Football season =

Nacional
2008–09 season
- Chairman: (Uruguay) Ricardo Alarcón
- Manager: (Uruguay) Gerardo Pelusso (until July 15, 2009) (Uruguay) Luis González
- Primera Division: Winners (42nd title)
- Torneo Apertura: 1st (8th title)
- Torneo Clausura: 6th
- Liguilla Pre-Libertadores: 6th
- Copa Libertadores: Semi-finals
- Top goalscorer: League: (Uruguay) Santiago García (10 goals); All: (Uruguay) Santiago García (13 goals)
Home colours	Away colours	Third colours

== Squad ==
As of August 2, 2009 Note: Flags indicate national team as defined under FIFA eligibility rules; some limited exceptions apply. Players may hold more than one non-FIFA nationality.

No.	Pos.	Nation	Player
1	GK	URU	Leonardo Burián
2	DF	URU	Alejandro Rodríguez
3	DF	ARG	Federico Domínguez
4	DF	URU	Mauricio Victorino (vice-captain)
5	DF	URU	Martín Rodríguez
6	DF	ARG	Matías Rodríguez
7	DF	URU	Diego Rodríguez
8	MF	URU	Diego Arismendi
9	FW	URU	Alexander Medina
10	MF	ARG	Ángel Morales
11	FW	URU	Sergio Blanco
12	GK	URU	Nicola Pérez
13	FW	URU	Martín Cauteruccio
14	MF	URU	Nicolás Lodeiro
15	DF	URU	Adrián Romero
16	FW	ARG	Marcos Mondaini
17	MF	URU	Roberto Brum
18	DF	URU	Pablo Caballero
19	DF	URU	Sebastián Coates
20	FW	URU	Santiago García
21	MF	URU	Oscar Javier Morales (captain)
22	MF	URU	Álvaro Fernández

No.	Pos.	Nation	Player
23	FW	URU	Jorge Cazulo
24	FW	URU	Gustavo Biscayzacú
25	GK	URU	Rodrigo Muñoz
—	GK	URU	Oscar Castro
—	GK	URU	Martín Tejera
—	DF	URU	Mathías Abero
—	DF	URU	Maximiliano Acuña
—	DF	URU	Gerardo Acosta
—	DF	URU	Gastón Filgueira
—	DF	URU	Martín Galain
—	DF	URU	Santiago Pereyra
—	DF	URU	Sebastián Sellanes
—	DF	CRC	Kendall Waston
—	MF	URU	Maximiliano Calzada
—	MF	URU	Thiago Magnone
—	MF	URU	Luis Oyarbide
—	MF	URU	Mauricio Pereyra
—	MF	URU	Facundo Píriz
—	MF	URU	Santiago Romero
—	FW	URU	Álvaro Apolito
—	FW	URU	Roberto Lujan
—	FW	URU	Bryan Machado

== Transfers ==
=== In ===
Note: Flags indicate national team as defined under FIFA eligibility rules; some limited exceptions apply. Players may hold more than one non-FIFA nationality.

No.	Pos.	Nation	Player
3	DF	ARG	Federico Domínguez (from (Cyprus) Apollon Limassol)
5	DF	URU	Martín Rodríguez (from (Argentina) Banfield)
6	DF	ARG	Matías Rodríguez (from (Austria) LASK Linz)
9	FW	URU	Alexander Medina (from (Spain) Racing Ferrol)
10	MF	ARG	Ángel Morales (from (Argentina) Olimpo)
16	FW	ARG	Marcos Mondaini (from (Argentina) Boca Juniors)
22	MF	URU	Álvaro Fernández (from (Mexico) Puebla)
23	MF	URU	Jorge Cazulo (from (Uruguay) Defensor Sporting)
24	FW	URU	Gustavo Biscayzacú (from (Chile) Colo-Colo)
25	GK	URU	Rodrigo Muñoz (from (Uruguay) Cerro)
—	DF	URU	Gastón Filgueira (from (Argentina) Arsenal)
—	DF	ARG	Walter García (from (Russia) Rubin Kazan)
—	DF	CRC	Kendall Waston (from (Costa Rica) Saprissa)

=== Out ===
Note: Flags indicate national team as defined under FIFA eligibility rules; some limited exceptions apply. Players may hold more than one non-FIFA nationality.

No.	Pos.	Nation	Player
1	GK	URU	Alexis Viera (to (Colombia) América de Cali)
2	DF	URU	Deivis Barone (to (Argentina) Colón)
3	DF	URU	Pablo Melo (to (Uruguay) Cerro)
7	FW	URU	Diego Perrone (to (Uruguay) Danubio)
9	FW	URU	Bruno Fornaroli (to (Italy) Sampdoria)
10	MF	URU	Martín Ligüera (to (Paraguay) Olimpia)
13	MF	URU	Mathías Cardacio (to (Italy) Milan)
15	MF	ARG	Nicolás Bertolo (to (Argentina) Banfield)
20	FW	URU	Richard Morales (to (Brazil) Grêmio)
24	FW	URU	Diego Vera (to (Uruguay) Defensor Sporting)
—	DF	ARG	Walter García (to (United States) New York Red Bulls)

== Statistics ==
=== Appearances and goals ===
Last updated on August 2, 2009.

No.	Pos	Nat	Player	Total		Primera División Uruguaya		Liguilla Pre-Libertadores		Copa Libertadores	
No.	Pos	Nat	Player	Apps	Goals	Apps	Goals	Apps	Goals	Apps	Goals
1	GK	(Uruguay) URU	Leonardo Burián	19	-28	12+1	-18	5+0	-10	1+0	0
2	DF	(Uruguay) URU	Alejandro Rodríguez	6	0	1+0	0	5+0	0	0+0	0
3	DF	(Argentina) ARG	Federico Domínguez	18	4	9+0	3	0+0	0	8+1	1
4	DF	(Uruguay) URU	Mauricio Victorino	29	5	20+1	4	0+0	0	8+0	1
5	DF	(Uruguay) URU	Martín Rodríguez	12	1	4+3	0	4+0	1	1+0	0
6	DF	(Argentina) ARG	Matías Rodríguez	37	0	28+0	0	0+1	0	8+0	0
7	DF	(Uruguay) URU	Diego Rodríguez	13	0	5+3	0	1+3	0	1+0	0
8	MF	(Uruguay) URU	Diego Arismendi	41	1	28+3	0	0+0	0	9+1	1
9	FW	(Uruguay) URU	Alexander Medina	32	7	14+10	6	0+0	0	8+0	1
10	MF	(Argentina) ARG	Ángel Morales	37	1	8+22	1	0+0	0	2+5	0
11	FW	(Uruguay) URU	Sergio Blanco	29	8	12+7	5	4+1	3	0+5	0
13	FW	(Uruguay) URU	Martín Cauteruccio	6	0	3+0	0	1+2	0	0+0	0
14	MF	(Uruguay) URU	Nicolás Lodeiro	35	8	23+2	4	0+0	0	8+2	4
15	DF	(Uruguay) URU	Adrián Romero	34	3	21+3	3	0+0	0	10+0	0
16	FW	(Argentina) ARG	Marcos Mondaini	16	3	7+2	1	0+0	0	6+1	2
17	MF	(Uruguay) URU	Roberto Brum	30	2	17+9	2	0+0	0	2+2	0
18	DF	(Uruguay) URU	Pablo Caballero	18	1	9+3	1	4+0	0	1+1	0
19	DF	(Uruguay) URU	Sebastián Coates	20	4	11+0	3	4+0	0	5+0	1
20	FW	(Uruguay) URU	Santiago García	42	13	24+6	10	4+0	2	2+6	1
21	MF	(Uruguay) URU	Oscar Javier Morales	36	1	24+3	1	0+0	0	9+0	0
22	MF	(Uruguay) URU	Álvaro Fernández	26	8	14+2	6	1+0	0	8+1	2
23	MF	(Uruguay) URU	Jorge Cazulo	9	2	3+4	1	2+0	1	0+0	0
24	FW	(Uruguay) URU	Gustavo Biscayzacú	17	8	6+6	8	2+0	0	3+0	0
25	GK	(Uruguay) URU	Rodrigo Muñoz	25	-25	16+0	-18	0+0	0	9+0	-7
—	GK	(Uruguay) URU	Alexis Viera*	8	-3	8+0	-3	0+0	0	0+0	0
—	DF	(Uruguay) URU	Mathías Abero	2	0	1+0	0	1+0	0	0+0	0
—	DF	(Uruguay) URU	Gastón Filgueira	14	1	14+0	1	0+0	0	0+0	0
—	DF	(Uruguay) URU	Martín Galain	7	0	5+0	0	0+0	0	1+1	0
—	DF	(Uruguay) URU	Pablo Melo*	13	0	12+1	0	0+0	0	0+0	0
—	MF	(Uruguay) URU	Maximiliano Calzada	6	0	0+1	0	5+0	0	0+0	0
—	MF	(Uruguay) URU	Martín Ligüera*	12	0	10+2	0	0+0	0	0+0	0
—	MF	(Uruguay) URU	Luis Oyarbide	5	0	1+1	0	0+3	0	0+0	0
—	MF	(Uruguay) URU	Mauricio Pereyra	13	0	3+1	0	5+0	0	0+4	0
—	MF	(Uruguay) URU	Facundo Píriz	10	0	2+4	0	3+1	0	0+0	0
—	FW	(Uruguay) URU	Álvaro Apolito	2	0	0+2	0	0+0	0	0+0	0
—	FW	(Uruguay) URU	Bryan Machado	3	0	0+0	0	1+2	0	0+0	0
—	FW	(Uruguay) URU	Diego Vera*	9	0	4+5	0	0+0	0	0+0	0

Note

- * = Players who left the club mid-season

=== Top scorers ===
Includes all competitive matches

Position	Nation	Number	Name	Primera División Uruguaya	Liguilla Pre-Libertadores	Copa Libertadores	Total
1	(Uruguay)	20	Santiago García	10	2	1	13
2	(Uruguay)	11	Sergio Blanco	5	3	0	8
=	(Uruguay)	14	Nicolás Lodeiro	4	0	4	8
=	(Uruguay)	22	Álvaro Fernández	6	0	2	8
=	(Uruguay)	24	Gustavo Biscayzacú	8	0	0	8
6	(Uruguay)	9	Alexander Medina	6	0	1	7
7	(Uruguay)	4	Mauricio Victorino	4	0	1	5
8	(Argentina)	3	Federico Domínguez	3	0	1	4
=	(Uruguay)	19	Sebastián Coates	3	0	1	4
10	(Uruguay)	15	Adrián Romero	3	0	0	3
=	(Argentina)	16	Marcos Mondaini	1	0	2	3
12	(Uruguay)	17	Roberto Brum	2	0	0	2
=	(Uruguay)	23	Jorge Cazulo	1	1	0	2
14	(Uruguay)	5	Martín Rodríguez	0	1	0	1
=	(Uruguay)	8	Diego Arismendi	0	0	1	1
=	(Argentina)	10	Ángel Morales	1	0	0	1
=	(Uruguay)	18	Pablo Caballero	1	0	0	1
=	(Uruguay)	21	Oscar Javier Morales	1	0	0	1
=	(Uruguay)	—	Gastón Filgueira	1	0	0	1
			**Own Goals**	1	1	0	2
			**Total**	**61**	**8**	**14**	83

=== Disciplinary record ===
**Position**	**Nation**	**Number**	**Name**	**Primera División Uruguaya**		**Liguilla Pre-Libertadores**		**Copa Libertadores**		Total	
**Position**	**Nation**	**Number**	**Name**	Booked	Sent off (straight red)	Booked	Sent off (straight red)	Booked	Sent off (straight red)	Booked	Sent off (straight red)
GK	(Uruguay)	1	Leonardo Burián	1	0	1	0	0	0	2	0
DF	(Uruguay)	2	Alejandro Rodríguez	0	0	3	0	0	0	3	0
DF	(Argentina)	3	Federico Domínguez	1	0	0	0	0	0	1	0
DF	(Uruguay)	4	Mauricio Victorino	5	0	0	0	0	0	5	0
DF	(Uruguay)	5	Martín Rodríguez	2	1	2	0	0	0	4	1
DF	(Argentina)	6	Matías Rodríguez	10	1	0	0	2	0	12	1
DF	(Uruguay)	7	Diego Rodríguez	1	0	1	0	0	0	2	0
MF	(Uruguay)	8	Diego Arismendi	14	1	0	0	3	0	17	1
FW	(Uruguay)	9	Alexander Medina	6	1	0	0	4	0	10	1
MF	(Argentina)	10	Ángel Morales	1	0	0	0	0	0	1	0
FW	(Uruguay)	11	Sergio Blanco	0	0	1	0	0	0	1	0
MF	(Uruguay)	14	Nicolás Lodeiro	6	1	0	0	1	0	7	1
DF	(Uruguay)	15	Adrián Romero	4	3	0	0	1	0	5	3
MF	(Uruguay)	17	Roberto Brum	13	0	0	0	0	1	13	1
DF	(Uruguay)	18	Pablo Caballero	3	0	2	1	1	0	6	1
DF	(Uruguay)	19	Sebastián Coates	2	0	2	1	1	0	5	1
FW	(Uruguay)	20	Santiago García	4	1	1	1	1	1	6	3
MF	(Uruguay)	21	Oscar Javier Morales	11	1	0	0	5	0	16	1
MF	(Uruguay)	22	Álvaro Fernández	2	0	0	0	2	0	4	0
MF	(Uruguay)	23	Jorge Cazulo	2	0	2	0	0	0	4	0
FW	(Uruguay)	24	Gustavo Biscayzacú	1	0	0	0	0	0	1	0
GK	(Uruguay)	25	Rodrigo Muñoz	1	0	0	0	0	0	1	0
GK	(Uruguay)	—	Alexis Viera*	1	0	0	0	0	0	1	0
DF	(Uruguay)	—	Mathías Abero	1	0	1	0	0	0	2	0
DF	(Uruguay)	—	Gastón Filgueira	4	0	0	0	0	0	4	0
DF	(Uruguay)	—	Martín Galain	1	0	0	0	0	0	1	0
DF	(Uruguay)	—	Pablo Melo*	9	0	0	0	0	0	9	0
MF	(Uruguay)	—	Maximiliano Calzada	0	0	2	0	0	0	2	0
MF	(Uruguay)	—	Martín Ligüera*	3	0	0	0	0	0	3	0
MF	(Uruguay)	—	Mauricio Pereyra	1	0	2	0	0	0	3	0
FW	(Uruguay)	—	Facundo Píriz	1	0	1	0	0	0	2	0
FW	(Uruguay)	—	Diego Vera*	2	0	0	0	0	0	2	0
			**Total**	**113**	**10**	**21**	**3**	**21**	**2**	155	15

Note

- * = Players who left the club mid-season

=== Captains ===
No.	Pos.	Name	Starts
21	MF	(Uruguay) Oscar Javier Morales	33
15	DF	(Uruguay) Adrián Romero	7
19	DF	(Uruguay) Sebastián Coates	4
4	DF	(Uruguay) Mauricio Victorino	3
18	DF	(Uruguay) Pablo Caballero	3

=== Penalties Awarded ===
Date	Success?	Penalty Taker	Opponent	Competition
2008-11-01	✓	(Uruguay) Santiago García	Liverpool	Primera División
2008-12-17	✓	(Uruguay) Sergio Blanco	Peñarol	Primera División
2009-02-07	✓	(Uruguay) Sergio Blanco	Central Español	Primera División
2009-03-22	✓	(Argentina) Federico Domínguez	Cerro Largo	Primera División
2009-04-12	✗	(Uruguay) Nicolás Lodeiro	Montevideo Wanderers	Primera División
2009-04-26	✗	(Argentina) Federico Domínguez	Liverpool	Primera División
2009-07-08	✓	(Uruguay) Santiago García	Defensor Sporting	Primera División

=== International players ===
The following is a list of all squad members who have played for their national sides during the 2008–09 season. Players in bold were in the starting XI for their national side.

14 October 2008

Name		Opponents	Mins.	Goals
URU	**Diego Arismendi**	Bolivia	90	0

20 January 2009

Name		Opponents	Mins.	Goals
(Uruguay) URU U-20	**Nicola Pérez**	Bolivia U-20	90	0
(Uruguay) URU U-20	**Sebastián Coates**	Bolivia U-20	71	0
(Uruguay) URU U-20	**Nicolás Lodeiro**	Bolivia U-20	90	2
(Uruguay) URU U-20	**Facundo Píriz**	Bolivia U-20	66	0
(Uruguay) URU U-20	Mauricio Pereyra	Bolivia U-20	24	0

22 January 2009

Name		Opponents	Mins.	Goals
(Uruguay) URU U-20	**Nicola Pérez**	Chile U-20	90	0
(Uruguay) URU U-20	**Mauricio Pereyra**	Chile U-20	90	0
(Uruguay) URU U-20	**Maximiliano Calzada**	Chile U-20	90	0
(Uruguay) URU U-20	**Santiago García**	Chile U-20	90	1
(Uruguay) URU U-20	Nicolás Lodeiro	Chile U-20	32	0

24 January 2009

Name		Opponents	Mins.	Goals
(Uruguay) URU U-20	**Nicola Pérez**	Paraguay U-20	90	0
(Uruguay) URU U-20	**Sebastián Coates**	Paraguay U-20	90	0
(Uruguay) URU U-20	**Nicolás Lodeiro**	Paraguay U-20	90	1
(Uruguay) URU U-20	**Maximiliano Calzada**	Paraguay U-20	90	0
(Uruguay) URU U-20	**Santiago García**	Paraguay U-20	75	1
(Uruguay) URU U-20	Mauricio Pereyra	Paraguay U-20	15	0

28 January 2009

Name		Opponents	Mins.	Goals
(Uruguay) URU U-20	**Sebastián Coates**	Brazil U-20	90	0
(Uruguay) URU U-20	**Facundo Píriz**	Brazil U-20	90	0
(Uruguay) URU U-20	Mauricio Pereyra	Brazil U-20	29	0

31 January 2009

Name		Opponents	Mins.	Goals
(Uruguay) URU U-20	**Nicola Pérez**	Brazil U-20	90	0
(Uruguay) URU U-20	**Maximiliano Calzada**	Brazil U-20	90	0
(Uruguay) URU U-20	**Santiago García**	Brazil U-20	62	0
(Uruguay) URU U-20	Mauricio Pereyra	Brazil U-20	28	0
(Uruguay) URU U-20	Nicolás Lodeiro	Brazil U-20	28	0

2 February 2009

Name		Opponents	Mins.	Goals
(Uruguay) URU U-20	Nicola Pérez	Colombia U-20	20	0
(Uruguay) URU U-20	Sebastián Coates	Colombia U-20	90	0
(Uruguay) URU U-20	Nicolás Lodeiro	Colombia U-20	90	0
(Uruguay) URU U-20	Mauricio Pereyra	Colombia U-20	90	0
(Uruguay) URU U-20	Maximiliano Calzada	Colombia U-20	90	0
(Uruguay) URU U-20	Santiago García	Colombia U-20	74	0

4 February 2009

Name		Opponents	Mins.	Goals
(Uruguay) URU U-20	**Sebastián Coates**	Argentina U-20	90	0
(Uruguay) URU U-20	**Nicolás Lodeiro**	Argentina U-20	90	0
(Uruguay) URU U-20	**Maximiliano Calzada**	Argentina U-20	68	0
(Uruguay) URU U-20	Mauricio Pereyra	Argentina U-20	25	0

6 February 2009

Name		Opponents	Mins.	Goals
(Uruguay) URU U-20	**Sebastián Coates**	Paraguay U-20	90	0
(Uruguay) URU U-20	**Facundo Píriz**	Paraguay U-20	90	0
(Uruguay) URU U-20	**Mauricio Pereyra**	Paraguay U-20	90	0
(Uruguay) URU U-20	Santiago García	Paraguay U-20	45	1

8 February 2009

Name		Opponents	Mins.	Goals
(Uruguay) URU U-20	**Nicolás Lodeiro**	Venezuela U-20	90	0
(Uruguay) URU U-20	**Facundo Píriz**	Venezuela U-20	56	0
(Uruguay) URU U-20	**Maximiliano Calzada**	Venezuela U-20	90	0
(Uruguay) URU U-20	**Santiago García**	Venezuela U-20	69	1

2 April 2009

Name		Opponents	Mins.	Goals
URU	Álvaro Fernández	Chile	60	0

6 June 2009

Name		Opponents	Mins.	Goals
URU	Álvaro Fernández	Brazil	25	0

11 June 2009

Name		Opponents	Mins.	Goals
URU	Álvaro Fernández	Venezuela	45	0

=== Starting 11 ===
No.	Pos.	Nat.	Name	MS	Notes
25	GK	(Uruguay)	Muñoz	25	Burián has 18 starts
4	CB	(Uruguay)	Victorino	28	
19	CB	(Uruguay)	Coates	20	
15	CB	(Uruguay)	Romero	31	
21	DM	(Uruguay)	O. Morales	33	Brum has 19 starts
8	RW	(Uruguay)	Arismendi	37	
6	LW	(Argentina)	Matías Rodríguez	36	Domínguez has 17 starts
22	RW	(Uruguay)	Fernández	23	Caballero has 14 starts
14	AM	(Uruguay)	Lodeiro	31	A. Morales has 10 starts
20	FW	(Uruguay)	S. García	30	Mondaini has 13 starts
9	FW	(Uruguay)	Medina	22	Blanco has 16 starts Biscayzacú has 11 starts

Last updated: 2 Aug 2009
Source: Squad stats and Start formations.
Only competitive matches.
Using the most used start formation.
Ordered by position on pitch (from back right to front left).

=== Overall ===
Games played	50 (35 Primera División Uruguaya, 5 Liguilla Pre-Libertadores, 10 Copa Libertadores)
Games won	25 (20 Primera División Uruguaya, 1 Liguilla Pre-Libertadores, 4 Copa Libertadores)
Games drawn	14 (9 Primera División Uruguaya, 1 Liguilla Pre-Libertadores, 4 Copa Libertadores)
Games lost	11 (6 Primera División Uruguaya, 3 Liguilla Pre-Libertadores, 2 Copa Libertadores)
Goals scored	83
Goals conceded	58
Goal difference	+25
Yellow cards	115
Red cards	15
Worst discipline	(Uruguay) Santiago García (6 (yellow card) , 3 (red card) )
Best result	3-0 (A) v (Paraguay) Nacional - Copa Libertadores 2009.02.13; 4-1 (A) v Racing - Primera División Uruguaya 2009.03.14; 3-0 (H) v (Argentina) River Plate - Copa Libertadores 2009.03.19; 3-0 (N) v Defensor Sporting - Primera División Uruguaya 2009.07.08
Worst result	0-3 (H) v Central Español - Primera División Uruguaya 2009.06.13
Most appearances	(Uruguay) Santiago García (42 appearances)
Top scorer	(Uruguay) Santiago García (13 goals)

Last updated: August 2
Source: Nacional

== Club ==
=== Coaching staff ===
Position	Staff
Manager	(Uruguay) Gerardo Pelusso (until July 15, 2009) (Uruguay) Luis González
Assistant manager	(Uruguay) Mauricio Larriera
Second assistant manager	(Uruguay) Willians Lemus
Goalkeeping coach	(Uruguay) Darwin Dalmás
Team Fitness Coach	(Uruguay) Javier Carballo (Uruguay) Fernando Cal
Club Doctor	(Uruguay) Carlos Suero
First Team Collaborator	(Uruguay) Ruben Sosa

Last updated: 2 August 2009
Source: Nacional

=== Other information ===
Chairman	(Uruguay) Ricardo Alarcón
Sports Manager	(Uruguay) Daniel Henríquez
Ground (capacity and dimensions)	Estadio Gran Parque Central (22,000 / 105x70 meters)

Updated to match played 02 August 2009
Source: Nacional

== Team Kit ==
Supplier: Umbro
Sponsor(s): Sinteplast
Macri Sport Center
EGA

Home	Away	Third kit

== Friendlies ==
2008-08-16
15:30 (UTC-3)

Florida (Uruguay)	0 – 7	(Uruguay) Nacional
	Report	Blanco 6', 9', 25'; Cauteruccio 32'; Victorino 57'; Lujan 77'; D. Rodríguez 83'

Estadio Campeones Olímpicos, Florida
Attendance: 4,000

2008-10-10
9:30 (UTC-3)

Nacional (Uruguay)	3 – 2	(Uruguay) Racing
Medina 34'; Vera 43'; Cauteruccio 69'	Report	Quiñones 48', 85' (pen.)

Estadio Gran Parque Central, Montevideo

2009-01-15
10:00 (UTC-3)

Colonia (Uruguay)	3 – 1	(Uruguay) Nacional
Miñones 15', 72', 84'	Report	Victorino 34'

Estadio Profesor Alberto Suppici, Colonia
Attendance: 2,000

2009-01-25
18:00 (UTC-3)

Nacional (Uruguay)	1 – 0	(Paraguay) Tacuary
Cazulo 86'	Report

Estadio Gran Parque Central, Montevideo
Attendance: 19,000

2009-03-25
18:00 (UTC-3)

Nacional (Uruguay)	4 – 2	(Uruguay) Rentistas
Oyarbide 18', 52'; Cauteruccio 43'; Biscayzacú 68'	Report	Sandoval 31' (pen.), 75'

Estadio Gran Parque Central, Montevideo

=== Copa Bimbo ===
==== Semi-finals ====
2009-01-17
19:20 (UTC-3)

Nacional (Uruguay)	2 – 1	(Uruguay) Peñarol
Matías Rodríguez (yellow card) 24'; Domínguez (red card) 39'; Blanco 45+1' (pen.); Medina (yellow card) 55'; Romero 68'; Filgueira (yellow card) 79'	Report	Bueno 15'; Alcoba (yellow card) 34'; Mozzo (yellow card) 45'; Arias (yellow card) 65'; F. Pérez (red card) 67'; Bueno (yellow card) 81'; Pacheco (yellow card) 87'

Estadio Centenario, Montevideo
Attendance: 27,000
Referee: Darío Ubríaco (Uruguay)

==== Final ====
2009-01-21
22:45 (UTC-3)

Nacional (Uruguay)	1 – 4	(Brazil) Cruzeiro
Medina 28'	Report	Elicarlos 8'; Ramires 26'; Thiago Ribeiro 36'; Wellington Paulista 38'; Jancarlos (red card) 73'

Estadio Centenario, Montevideo
Referee: Roberto Silvera (Uruguay)

== Primera División Uruguaya ==
=== Apertura's table ===
Pos	Team	Pld	W	D	L	GF	GA	GD	Pts	Qualification
1	Danubio	15	10	2	3	27	15	+12	32	Apertura tiebreaker
2	Nacional	15	10	2	3	23	13	+10	32	Apertura tiebreaker
3	Defensor Sporting	15	9	3	3	23	12	+11	30	
4	Racing	15	7	6	2	24	12	+12	27	
5	Liverpool	15	7	6	2	24	14	+10	27	

Updated to match(es) played on February 7, 2009. Source: RSSSF
Rules for classification: 1) points; 2) goal difference; 3) number of goals scored.
- The apertura's winner qualifies for the semifinal of the Primera División

==== Matches ====
2008-08-23
15:30 (UTC-3)

Juventud	0 – 1	Nacional
Planchón (yellow card) 10' (yellow-red card) 36'; Velázquez (yellow card) 27'; Peirano (yellow card) 29'; Bueno (red card) 80'	Report	Romero 47'; Arismendi (yellow card) 49'; Matías Rodríguez (yellow card) 75'; D. Rodríguez (yellow card) 90'

Estadio Charrúa, Montevideo
Referee: Héctor Martínez

2008-09-13
15:30 (UTC-3)

Tacuarembó	0 – 2	Nacional
	Report	Brum 44' (yellow card) 83'; Filgueira (yellow card) 58'; Caballero 90+2'

Estadio Ingeniero Raùl Goyenola, Tacuarembó
Referee: Jorge Larrionda

2008-09-27
15:30 (UTC-3)

Nacional	2 – 0	Racing
S. García 8', 72'; Melo (yellow card) 22'; Arismendi (yellow card) 33'	Report	Balsas (yellow card) 24'; J. Rodríguez (yellow card) 29'; Díaz (yellow card) 44' (yellow-red card) 64'; Ostolaza (yellow card) 78'

Estadio Gran Parque Central, Montevideo
Referee: Roberto Silvera

2008-09-27
15:30 (UTC-3)

Cerro Largo	2 – 3	Nacional
D. Silvera 20', 67'; Souza (yellow card) 54'; De Souza (yellow card) 55'; Ruiz (yellow card) 82' (yellow-red card) 90'	Report	A. Morales (yellow card) 5' (goal) 86'; Filgueira 10'; Lodeiro (yellow card) 25'; Romero 28'; Vera (yellow card) 84'; Brum (yellow card) 90'

Estadio Centenario, Montevideo
Referee: Heber Rodríguez

2008-10-05
16:30 (UTC-3)

Nacional	2 – 2	Defensor Sporting
Gaglianone 19' (o.g.); Brum (yellow card) 22'; Arismendi (yellow card) 45' (yellow-red card) 69'; Vera (yellow card) 63'; Melo (yellow card) 76'; Medina 85'	Report	de Souza 8', 78' (pen.) (yellow card) 26'; Curbelo (yellow card) 36'; Díaz (yellow card) 45'; Maximiliano Pérez (yellow card) 56'; Suárez (yellow card) 63'; Risso (red card) 66'

Estadio Gran Parque Central, Montevideo
Referee: Martín Vázquez

2008-10-18
16:30 (UTC-3)

Montevideo Wanderers	0 – 1	Nacional
González (yellow card) 40'; Quagliotti (yellow card) 54' (yellow-red card) 90'; Laserda (red card) 88'	Report	Lodeiro (yellow card) 17'; M. Rodríguez (yellow card) 39'; Brum 39'; Melo (yellow card) 86'

Estadio Centenario, Montevideo
Referee: Jorge Larrionda

2008-10-26
16:30 (UTC-3)

Bella Vista	0 – 1	Nacional
Secco (yellow card) 4'; Camacho (yellow card) 13'; Rubén Fernández (yellow card) 37'; Reyes (yellow card) 42'	Report	Melo (yellow card) 28'; Filgueira (yellow card) 52'; Arismendi (yellow card) 67'; S. García 72'; O. Morales (yellow card) 73'

Estadio José Nasazzi, Montevideo
Referee: Roberto Silvera

2008-11-01
17:00 (UTC-3)

Nacional	1 – 2	Liverpool
Filgueira (yellow card) 17'; Lodeiro (yellow card) 41'; Melo (yellow card) 76'; S. García 76' (pen.)	Report	Aranda (yellow card) 12'; Varela (yellow card) 42'; Rueli 47'; Lalinde (red card) 52'; Castro (yellow card) 68'; Alfaro 70'

Estadio Centenario, Montevideo
Referee: Gustavo Siegler

2008-11-08
17:00 (UTC-3)

Nacional	2 – 0	Rampla Juniors
O. Morales 17'; Medina 42' (yellow card) 42'; Viera (yellow card) 85'	Report	Ferreira (yellow card) 45'; Perujo (yellow card) 57'; Merlo (yellow card) 75'; Rosa (yellow card) 75'

Estadio Charrúa, Montevideo
Referee: Darío Ubríaco

2008-11-16
17:00 (UTC-3)

Danubio	1 – 0	Nacional
Malrrechaufe (yellow card) 20'; Ferro (yellow card) 49'; J. García 50'; Amarilla (yellow card) 89'	Report	Medina (yellow card) 48'; S. García (yellow card) 67'; Arismendi (yellow card) 70'; Romero (red card) 90+3'

Jardines del Hipódromo, Montevideo
Referee: Jorge Larrionda

2008-12-03
19:10 (UTC-3)

Nacional	2 – 0	Villa Española
Ligüera (yellow card) 19'; Blanco 22'; Cazulo (yellow card) 45'; Melo (yellow card) 52'; S. García 54'; Arismendi (yellow card) 59'; Brum (yellow card) 89'	Report	M. Novick (yellow card) 14'; Figueredo (yellow card) 70'; Cassaman (yellow card) 86'

Estadio Centenario, Montevideo
Referee: Martín Vázquez

2008-12-06
17:00 (UTC-3)

Nacional	3 – 3	Cerro
Medina 12' (yellow card) 64'; Brum (yellow card) 45'; Blanco 49'; Arismendi (yellow card) 54'; Melo (yellow card) 59'; Ligüera (yellow card) 62'; Victorino 87'	Report	Pablo Caballero 35'; Pallante (yellow card) 65'; Muñoz 65' (pen.), 70'; Molina (yellow card) 76'

Estadio Centenario, Montevideo
Referee: Roberto Silvera

2008-12-14
17:00 (UTC-3)

Peñarol	0 – 1	Nacional
Bueno (yellow card) 4'; Mozzo (yellow card) 5'; I. Medina (yellow card) 41'; Alcoba (yellow card) 70'	Report	Matías Rodríguez (yellow card) 28'; Ligüera (yellow card) 55'; Melo (yellow card) 64'; S. García (yellow card) 67' (red card) 72'; Blanco 72' (pen.); Arismendi (yellow card) 88'

Estadio Centenario, Montevideo
Attendance: 40,000
Referee: Jorge Larrionda

2008-12-17
19:30 (UTC-3)

Nacional	0 – 2	River Plate
Burián (yellow card) 8'; Filgueira (yellow card) 40'; O. Morales (yellow card) 42'; Melo (yellow card) 71'; Brum (yellow card) 85'	Report	Giménez 34' (yellow card) 40'; J. Rodríguez (yellow card) 49'; Ortíz (yellow card) 87'; Nicolay 90+2'

Estadio Centenario, Montevideo
Referee: Darío Ubríaco

2009-02-07
17:00 (UTC-3)

Central Español	1 – 2	Nacional
Lemos (yellow card) 6' (yellow-red card) 23'; Daluz 52'; Andrés Fernández (yellow card) 57' (yellow-red card) 67'; Semperena (yellow card) 65'	Report	Blanco 25' (pen.); Álvaro Fernández 37'

Estadio Centenario, Montevideo
Referee: Juan Cardellino

==== Final ====
2009-02-15
19:00 (UTC-3)

Nacional	2 – 1	Danubio
Galain (yellow card) 20'; Romero (yellow card) 38' (yellow-red card) 51'; Fernández 60'; S. García 77'; Caballero (yellow card) 81'	Report	R. Rodríguez (yellow card) 2'; Ifrán (yellow card) 34'; S. Rodríguez 36'; Malrrechaufe (yellow card) 65'; Ferro (yellow card) 83'; Amarilla (red card) 89'

Estadio Centenario, Montevideo
Attendance: 40,000
Referee: Jorge Larrionda

=== Clausura's table ===
Villa Española was relegated due to financial issues after the Apertura.

Pos	Team	Pld	W	D	L	GF	GA	GD	Pts
4	Liverpool	14	7	4	3	23	17	+6	25
5	Peñarol	14	7	2	5	22	15	+7	23
6	Nacional	14	6	5	3	27	21	+6	23
7	Racing	14	6	5	3	22	17	+5	23
8	Montevideo Wanderers	14	6	3	5	25	24	+1	21

Updated to match(es) played on June 18, 2009. Source: RSSSF
Rules for classification: 1) points; 2) goal difference; 3) number of goals scored.
- The clausura's winner qualifies for the semifinal of the Primera División

==== Matches ====
2009-02-22
17:00 (UTC-3)

Nacional	2 – 2	Juventud
Álvaro Fernández 22'; Medina 87'	Report	Pizzichillo (yellow card) 28'; Peirano (yellow card) 43'; Britos 48' (yellow card) 53'; Antonio Fernández (yellow card) 66' (goal) 72'; Ramírez (yellow card) 84'; González (yellow card) 85'

Estadio Gran Parque Central, Montevideo
Referee: Javier Bentancur

2009-03-08
17:00 (UTC-3)

Nacional	1 – 0	Tacuarembó
Domínguez 21'; O. Morales (yellow card) 62'; Matías Rodríguez (yellow card) 77'	Report	Pozzi (yellow card) 37'; Da Rosa (yellow card) 57' (yellow-red card) 90'; Silva (yellow card) 64'

Estadio Gran Parque Central, Montevideo
Referee: Fernando Falce

2009-03-14
17:00 (UTC-3)

Racing	1 – 4	Nacional
Ostolaza (yellow card) 27'; Blanes 36'	Report	Victorino (yellow card) 55'; Fernández 57'; Domínguez 60'; Medina 90', 90+4'; Matías Rodríguez (yellow card) 90+2'

Estadio Centenario, Montevideo
Referee: Jorge Larrionda

2009-03-22
16:00 (UTC-3)

Nacional	2 – 2	Cerro Largo
Arismendi (yellow card) 80'; Domínguez 85' (pen.); Victorino 90+4'	Report	Olivera 12' (yellow card) 89'; L. Rodríguez (yellow card) 41'; Rivero 56'

Estadio Gran Parque Central, Montevideo
Referee: Robert Tabeira

2009-03-22
17:00 (UTC-3)

Defensor Sporting	3 – 2	Nacional
Gaglianone 23' (yellow card) 81'; Marchant (yellow card) 27'; Amado (yellow card) 29' de Souza (yellow card) 60' (goal) 90' (pen.), 90+2'	Report	Fernández 11'; Matías Rodríguez (yellow card) 36'; Arismendi (yellow card) 54'; O. Morales (yellow card) 80'; Lodeiro 83'; Victorino (yellow card) 90'

Estadio Centenario, Montevideo
Referee: Darío Ubríaco

2009-04-12
17:00 (UTC-3)

Nacional	2 – 2	Montevideo Wanderers
Cazulo 46'; Mondaini 70'; M. Pereyra (yellow card) 71'; O. Morales (yellow card) 84'; Brum (yellow card) 90'	Report	Peña (yellow card) 23'; Corujo (yellow card) 30'; Charquero 34', 45'; D. Pérez (yellow card) 43'; Tellechea (yellow card) 63'; Palau (yellow card) 66'

Estadio Gran Parque Central, Montevideo
Referee: Roberto Silvera

2009-04-18
17:00 (UTC-3)

Nacional	2 – 0	Bella Vista
Matías Rodríguez (yellow card) 30'; S. García 32', 89'; Brum (yellow card) 68'	Report	Martuciello (yellow card) 57'; Alvez (yellow card) 81'

Estadio Gran Parque Central, Montevideo
Referee: Daniel Fedorczuk

2009-04-26
17:00 (UTC-3)

Liverpool	1 – 1	Nacional
Rodales (yellow card) 13'; Figueroa 33'; Correa (yellow card) 61'; Vázquez (yellow card) 56'; Tejera (yellow card) 66'	Report	Victorino (yellow card) 37'; Brum (yellow card) 56'; Coates 60'

Estadio Centenario, Montevideo
Referee: Fredy De Seja

2009-05-03
17:00 (UTC-3)

Rampla Juniors	1 – 3	Nacional
Rosa (yellow card) 33'; Bonjour (yellow card) 44'; Alonso 56' (yellow card) 87'	Report	Arismendi (yellow card) 13'; S. García 20'; Biscayzacú 67'; Lodeiro 77'

Estadio Centenario, Montevideo
Referee: Juan Cardellino

2009-05-09
17:00 (UTC-3)

Nacional	2 – 0	Danubio
Matías Rodríguez (yellow card) 8'; Biscayzacú 15', 53'; O. Morales (yellow card) 22'; Romero (yellow card) 55'	Report	J. García (yellow card) 34'; Migues (yellow card) 52'; Ferro (yellow card) 62'; Delgado (red card) 65'; R. Rodríguez (yellow card) 75'; Amarilla (yellow card) 81'

Estadio Gran Parque Central, Montevideo
Referee: Luis Larrañaga

2009-05-17
17:00 (UTC-3)

Cerro	2 – 2	Nacional
Pablo Caballero 33' (yellow card) 33'; Melo (yellow card) 52'; Cabrera (yellow card) 74'; Pallante 78' (pen.)	Report	Biscayzacú 3'; Arismendi (yellow card) 28'; Brum (yellow card) 45'; Victorino 53'; Martín Rodríguez (yellow card) 75' (yellow-red card) 77'

Estadio Centenario, Montevideo
Referee: Gustavo Siegler

2009-05-24
16:00 (UTC-3)

Nacional	3 – 2	Peñarol
Biscayzacú 15', 41', 74' (yellow card) 81'; Victorino (yellow card) 19'; Coates (yellow card) 37'; O. Morales (yellow card) 61' (yellow-red card) 81'; Matías Rodríguez (yellow card) 89'; Muñoz (yellow card) 90+4'	Report	Pacheco 20', 39' (pen.); O. Pérez (yellow card) 22' de los Santos (yellow card) 25'; Alcoba (yellow card) 60'; Bueno (yellow card) 80' (yellow-red card) 90+1'; Darío Rodríguez (yellow card) 90+2'

Estadio Centenario, Montevideo
Attendance: 40,000
Referee: Roberto Silvera

2009-05-31
17:00 (UTC-3)

River Plate	2 – 1	Nacional
Ezquerra 29'; Giménez 62'; Córdoba (yellow card) 77'; Rizzoto (yellow card) 88'	Report	S. García (yellow card) 38'; Brum (yellow card) 50'; Martín Rodríguez (yellow card) 65'; Blanco 90+2'

Estadio Centenario, Montevideo
Referee: Darío Ubríaco

2009-06-13
16:00 (UTC-3)

Nacional	0 – 3	Central Español
Píriz (yellow card) 36'; Abero (yellow card) 43'; Cazulo (yellow card) 47'; Caballero (yellow card) 69'	Report	Gutiérrez (yellow card) 19'; Coelho 35'; Firpo (yellow card) 44'; S. Pérez (yellow card) 50'; Duran 47'; Da Luz 79'

Estadio Centenario, Montevideo
Referee: Marcelo López

=== Aggregate table ===
Pos	Team	Pld	W	D	L	GF	GA	GD	Pts	Qualification
1	Defensor Sporting	29	20	4	5	52	27	+25	64	Championship Playoffs and the Liguilla Pre-Libertadores
2	Nacional	29	16	7	6	49	34	+15	55	Liguilla Pre-Libertadores
3	Cerro	29	15	7	7	50	25	+25	52	Liguilla Pre-Libertadores
4	Liverpool	29	14	10	5	44	32	+12	52	Liguilla Pre-Libertadores
5	River Plate	29	14	8	7	49	34	+15	50	Liguilla Pre-Libertadores

Updated to match(es) played on June 18, 2009. Source: RSSSF
Rules for classification: 1) points; 2) goal difference; 3) number of goals scored.
- The aggregate's winners qualify to Primera División Uruguaya final
- The aggregate's top-six qualify to Liguilla Pre-Libertadores

==== Results by round ====
Round	1	2	3	4	5	6	7	8	9	10	11	12	13	14	15	16	17	18	19	20	21	22	23	24	25	26	27	28	29
Ground	A	A	H	A	H	A	A	H	H	A	H	H	A	H	A	H	H	A	H	A	H	H	A	A	H	A	H	A	H
Result	W	W	W	W	D	W	W	L	W	L	W	D	W	L	W	D	W	W	D	L	D	W	D	W	W	D	W	L	L
Position	2	5	4	2	1	1	1	1	1	2	1	2	1	2	2	3	2	2	2	2	4	4	3	2	2	2	2	2	2

Updated to match(es) played on 2009-06-18. Source: Matches
A = Away; H = Home; W = Win; D = Draw; L = Loss

=== Relegation table ===
Pos	Team	2007-08 Pts.	2008-09 Pts.	Total Pts	Total Pld	Avg
1	Defensor Sporting	66	64	130	59	2.203
2	River Plate	61	50	111	59	1.881
3	Nacional	55	55	110	59	1.864
4	Peñarol	54	48	102	59	1.729
5	Racing	0	50	50	29	1.724
6	Liverpool	43	52	95	59	1.610
7	Danubio	46	47	93	59	1.576
8	Cerro	37	52	89	59	1.508
9	Montevideo Wanderers	44	35	79	59	1.339
10	Rampla Juniors	47	19	66	59	1.119
11	Central Español	32	32	64	59	1.085
12	Tacuarembó	34	29	63	59	1.068
13	Cerro Largo	0	28	28	29	0.966
14	Juventud (R)	40	16	56	59	0.949
15	Bella Vista (R)	23	27	50	59	0.847
16	Villa Española (R)	0	12	12	15	0.800

As of June 18, 2009.

- The three clubs with the lowest average of points over the last two seasons are relegated.

=== Semi-finals ===
==== First leg ====
2009-06-21
17:00 (UTC-3)

Defensor Sporting	1 – 1	Nacional
de Souza 24'; Risso (yellow card) 27'; Díaz (yellow card) 28'	Report	Matías Rodríguez (yellow card) 10' (yellow-red card) 60'; Lodeiro (yellow card) 18' (goal) 21'; Domínguez (yellow card) 38'; O. Morales (yellow card) 45'; Medina (yellow card) 53'; Arismendi (yellow card) 84'

Estadio Centenario, Montevideo
Attendance: 15,000
Referee: Martín Vázquez

==== Second leg ====
2009-07-05
17:00 (UTC-3)

Nacional	1 – 1	Defensor Sporting
Romero 24'; Arismendi (yellow card) 48'; O. Morales (yellow card) 65'; Lodeiro (yellow card) 70' (yellow-red card) 75'; Medina (yellow card) 85'; Victorino (yellow card) 90'	Report	Vera (yellow card) 37' (goal) 44'; Marchant (yellow card) 41'; Navarro (yellow card) 70'

Estadio Centenario, Montevideo
Attendance: 17,000
Referee: Darío Ubriaco

==== Third leg ====
2009-07-08
21:10 (UTC-3)

Defensor Sporting	0 – 3	Nacional
Díaz (yellow card) 16'; Pintos (yellow card) 38' de Souza (red card) 61'; Vila (yellow card) 85'	Report	Medina (yellow card) 23'; S. García 32' (pen.) (yellow card) 63'; Caballero (yellow card) 40'; Coates 74'; Fernández 77'

Estadio Centenario, Montevideo
Attendance: 18,000
Referee: Roberto Silvera

Nacional won 5–2 on points.

=== Final ===
==== First leg ====
2009-07-12
17:00 (UTC-3)

Defensor Sporting	1 – 2	Nacional
Silva (red card) 45'; Curbelo (yellow card) 55'; Amado (yellow card) 59'; Pintos 66'; Gaglianone (yellow card) 85'	Report	Fernández (yellow card) 20'; Medina (red card) 45'; Coates (yellow card) 49' (goal) 78'; Biscayzacú 86'; O. Morales (yellow card) 90'

Estadio Centenario, Montevideo
Attendance: 16,000
Referee: Martín Vázquez

==== Second leg ====
2009-07-15
21:10 (UTC-3)

Nacional	2 – 1	Defensor Sporting
Victorino 27'; Fernández (yellow card) 32'; Lodeiro 86' (yellow card) 86'	Report	Herrera (yellow card) 34'; Navarro 59'; Amado (yellow card) 64'; F. Rodríguez (yellow card) 78'

Estadio Centenario, Montevideo
Attendance: 40,000
Referee: Jorge Larrionda

Nacional won 6–0 on points.

== Copa Libertadores ==
=== Group stage ===
Pos	Team	Pld	W	D	L	GF	GA	GD	Pts
1	(Uruguay) Nacional	6	4	2	0	12	3	+9	14
2	(Peru) Universidad San Martín	6	2	2	2	7	9	−2	8
3	(Argentina) River Plate	6	2	1	3	7	9	−2	7
4	(Paraguay) Nacional	6	1	1	4	7	12	−5	4

2009-02-12
19:00 (UTC-3)

Nacional (Uruguay)	2 – 1	(Peru) Universidad San Martín
Domínguez 30'; Lodeiro 90+2'	Report	Arzuaga 39' (yellow card) 46'; Hinostroza (yellow card) 59'; Guizasola (yellow card) 74'; Ramos (yellow card) 79'

Estadio Gran Parque Central, Montevideo
Attendance: 11,518
Referee: Carlos Chandía (Chile)

2009-02-18
18:30 (UTC-3)

Nacional (Paraguay)	0 – 3	(Uruguay) Nacional
Melgarejo (yellow card) 40'	Report	Fernández 9' (yellow card) 54'; Lodeiro 38'; Mondaini 64'

Estadio General Pablo Rojas, Asunción
Attendance: 1,307
Referee: Leonardo Gaciba (Brazil)

2009-03-19
21:45 (UTC-3)

Nacional (Uruguay)	3 – 0	(Argentina) River Plate
Medina (yellow card) 31'; Álvaro Fernández 40'; Arismendi (yellow card) 45'; Lodeiro 73'; O. Morales (yellow card) 90+1'; S. García (red card) 90+3'; Victorino 90+5'	Report	Ferrari (yellow card) 29'; Augusto Fernández (yellow card) 31'; Quiroga (yellow card) 53'

Estadio Centenario, Montevideo
Attendance: 47,571
Referee: Carlos Chandía (Chile)

2009-04-07
21:15 (UTC-3)

River Plate (Argentina)	0 – 0	(Uruguay) Nacional
Ahumada (yellow card) 24'; Sánchez (yellow card) 34'	Report	O. Morales (yellow card) 38'; Medina (yellow card) 50'

Estadio Antonio V. Liberti, Buenos Aires
Referee: Salvio Fagundes (Brazil)

2009-04-21
22:30 (UTC-3)

Universidad San Martín (Peru)	1 – 1	(Uruguay) Nacional
Ludueña 88'	Report	S. García (yellow card) 28'; Mondaini 74'; O. Morales (yellow card) 79'

Estadio Alejandro Villanueva, Lima
Referee: Carlos Simon (Brazil)

2009-04-30
21:30 (UTC-3)

Nacional (Uruguay)	3 – 1	(Paraguay) Nacional
Arismendi 29'; Caballero (yellow card) 59'; Coates 80' (yellow card) 88'; Lodeiro 90+1'	Report	Núñez 9'; Riveros (yellow card) 32'; Miranda (yellow card) 38' (yellow-red card) 62'

Estadio Centenario, Montevideo
Referee: René Ortubé (Bolivia)

=== Round of 16 ===
==== First leg ====
Nacional (Uruguay)	–	(Mexico) San Luis

==== Second leg ====
San Luis (Mexico)	–	(Uruguay) Nacional

San Luis withdrew from the tournament over the H1N1 flu outbreak in Mexico

=== Quarterfinals ===
==== First leg ====
2009-05-28
22:00 (UTC-3)

Palmeiras (Brazil)	1 – 1	(Uruguay) Nacional
Armero (yellow card) 18'; Diego Souza 55'; Obina (yellow card) 61'; Pierre (yellow card) 85'	Report	O. Morales (yellow card) 42'; S. García 80'; Fernández (yellow card) 90+1'; Brum (red card) 90+4'

Estádio Palestra Itália, São Paulo
Attendance: 24,737
Referee: Carlos Torres (Paraguay)

==== Second leg ====
2009-06-17
19:20 (UTC-3)

Nacional (Uruguay)	0 – 0	(Brazil) Palmeiras
Medina (yellow card) 45'; Lodeiro (yellow card) 69'; O. Morales (yellow card) 90'	Report	Diego Souza (yellow card) 72'

Estadio Centenario, Montevideo
Attendance: 46,269
Referee: Carlos Vera (Ecuador)

Nacional 1–1 Palmeiras on aggregate. Nacional won on away goals.

=== Semi-finals ===
==== First leg ====
2009-06-28
19:30 (UTC-3)

Estudiantes (Argentina)	1 – 0	(Uruguay) Nacional
Galván 14'; Benítez (yellow card) 47'	Report	Romero (yellow card) 39'; Arismendi (yellow card) 61'; Matías Rodríguez (yellow card) 69'

Estadio Ciudad de La Plata, La Plata
Referee: René Ortubé (Bolivia)

==== Second leg ====
2009-07-01
21:15 (UTC-3)

Nacional (Uruguay)	1 – 2	(Argentina) Estudiantes
Medina (yellow card) 17' (goal) 75'; Matías Rodríguez (yellow card) 57'; Arismendi (yellow card) 88'	Report	E. Pérez (yellow card) 9'; Boselli 52', 90+1' (yellow card) 52'; Sánchez (yellow card) 64'; Braña (yellow card) 71'; Andújar (yellow card) 84'

Estadio Centenario, Montevideo
Attendance: 46,983
Referee: Carlos Torres (Paraguay)

Estudiantes won 3–1 on aggregate.

== Liguilla Pre-Libertadores ==
Pos	Team	Pld	W	D	L	GF	GA	GD	Pts	Qualification
2	Racing	5	3	1	1	11	7	+4	10	2010 Copa Libertadores First Stage
3	River Plate	5	2	0	3	7	11	−4	6	2009 Copa Sudamericana First Stage
4	Liverpool	5	1	2	2	6	7	−1	5	Liguilla 4th place tiebreaker
5	Defensor Sporting	5	1	2	2	5	6	−1	5	Liguilla 4th place tiebreaker
6	Nacional	5	1	1	3	8	12	−4	4	

Updated to match(es) played on August 2, 2009. Source: RSSSF
Rules for classification: 1st points; 2nd goal difference; 3rd playoff (if needed)
- The Liguilla Pre-Libertadores' champion qualify to Copa Libertadores 2010 group stage
- The Liguilla Pre-Libertadores' runners-up qualify to Copa Libertadores 2010 preliminary round
- The Liguilla Pre-Libertadores' third and fourth place qualify to Copa Sudamericana 2009 first stage
- If Nacional finish in the top-four qualify to Copa Sudamericana 2009 first stage

=== Matches ===
2009-07-19
15:10 (UTC-3)

Cerro	3 – 1	Nacional
Pallante (yellow card) 29'; Dadomo 40'; Núñez (yellow card) 57'; Boghossian 64'; Melo 90+3'	Report	Calzada (yellow card) 16'; M. Pereyra (yellow card) 30'; Píriz (yellow card) 37'; Coates (yellow card) 67'; Blanco 85'

Estadio Centenario, Montevideo
Referee: Roberto Silvera

2009-07-23
20:10 (UTC-3)

Racing	3 – 2	Nacional
Blanes (yellow card) 21'; Torres 38'; P. Hernández 63'; Balsas 78'	Report	Blanco (yellow card) 15'; Martín Rodríguez 34'; Abero (yellow card) 48'; Cazulo (yellow card) 61'; A. Rodríguez (yellow card) 64'; Blanco 75'; M. Pereyra (yellow card) 67'; Caballero (red card) 88'

Estadio Luis Franzini, Montevideo
Referee: Fernando Falce

2009-07-26
17:10 (UTC-3)

River Plate	4 – 2	Nacional
Giménez 19'; J. Rodríguez (yellow card) 22' (goal) 66'; Montelongo 40', 90' (pen.); Zambrana (yellow card) 45'; Conceicao (yellow card) 85'	Report	Cazulo 5'; S. García (yellow card) 12' (yellow-red card) 20'; A. Rodríguez (yellow card) 16'; Coates (yellow card) 69'; Blanco 62'; D. Rodríguez (yellow card) 78'; Martín Rodríguez (yellow card) 84'

Estadio Luis Franzini, Montevideo
Referee: Oscar Rojas

2009-07-29
15:10 (UTC-3)

Nacional	0 – 0	Defensor Sporting
Calzada (yellow card) 32'; Cazulo (yellow card) 32'; Caballero (yellow card) 40'; Martín Rodríguez (yellow card) 66'; A. Rodríguez (yellow card) 83'	Report	Ariosa (yellow card) 10'; Curbelo (yellow card) 16' (yellow-red card) 76'; Risso (yellow card) 48'; Díaz (red card) 80'

Estadio José Nasazzi, Montevideo
Referee: Luis Larrañaga

2009-08-02
15:00 (UTC-3)

Liverpool	2 – 3	Nacional
Lalinde 81'; Alfaro 89'	Report	Caballero (yellow card) 45'; Burián (yellow card) 45+1'; Macchi 61' (o.g.); S. García 74', 80'

Estadio José Nasazzi, Montevideo
Referee: Fernando Falce

== Records ==
=== Doubles achieved ===
Opponent	Home result	Away result
Tacuarembó	1–0	2–0
Racing	2–0	4–1
Bella Vista	2–0	1–0
Rampla Juniors	2–0	3–1
Peñarol	3–2	1–0
Defensor Sporting	2–1	2–1
Nacional (Paraguay)	3–1	3–0

=== Comeback ===
Nacional have conceded the first goal in a match 17 times this season in the Primera División, the Liguille Pre-Libertadores and the Copa Libertadores, recorded 4 wins, 5 draws and 8 loss.

Opponent	H/A	Result	Scoreline
Danubio	N	2–1	S. Rodríguez 36', Fernández 60', S. García 77'
Racing	A	4–1	Blanes 36', Fernández 57', Domínguez 60', Medina 90', 90+4'
Defensor Sporting	A	2–1	Pintos 66', Coates 68', Biscayzacú 86'
Nacional (Paraguay)	H	3–1	Núñez 9', Arismendi 29', Coates 80', Lodeiro 90+1'

=== Biggest winning margin ===
#	Opponent	H/A	Result	Competition
1	Racing	A	4–1	Primera División
2	Nacional (Paraguay)	A	3–0	Copa Libertadores
2	River Plate (Argentina)	H	3–0	Copa Libertadores
2	Defensor Sporting	N	3–0	Primera División
5	Rampla Juniors	A	3–1	Primera División
5	Nacional (Paraguay)	H	3–1	Primera División
6	Tacuarembó	A	2–0	Primera División
6	Racing	H	2–0	Primera División
6	Rampla Juniors	H	2–0	Primera División
6	Villa Española	H	2–0	Primera División
6	Bella Vista	H	2–0	Primera División
6	Danubio	H	2–0	Primera División

== Team statistics ==
=== Goal minutes ===
Updated to games played on 2 August 2009.

1'–15'	16'–30'	31'–HT	46'–60'	61'–75'	76'–FT
9	13	10	10	15	26

== Honours ==
=== Team ===
Torneo Apertura

- Winners: 2008

Primera División Uruguaya

- Winners: 2008–09

=== Individuals ===
Name	Number	Country	Award
Mauricio Victorino	4	Uruguay	Primera División Uruguaya Fan's Best Player of the year
Nicola Pérez	12	Uruguay	2009 South American Youth Championship third place
Nicolas Lodeiro	14	Uruguay	2009 South American Youth Championship third place
Adrián Romero	15	Uruguay	Primera División Uruguaya Best Defender of the year
Sebastián Coates	19	Uruguay	Primera División Uruguaya Revelation of the year, 2009 South American Youth Championship third place
Santiago García	20	Uruguay	Primera División Uruguaya Best Forward of the year, 2009 South American Youth Championship third place
Oscar Javier Morales	21	Uruguay	Primera División Uruguaya Best Midfielder of the year
Maximiliano Calzada	—	Uruguay	2009 South American Youth Championship third place
Mauricio Pereyra	—	Uruguay	2009 South American Youth Championship third place
Facundo Píriz	—	Uruguay	2009 South American Youth Championship third place
Ricardo Alarcón	—	Uruguay	Primera División Uruguaya Best Chairman of the year
Javier Carballo	—	Uruguay	Primera División Uruguaya Best Team Fitnes Coach of the year

== See also ==
- Club Nacional de Football
