= Padula (surname) =

Padula, La Padula, or Lapadula is a surname. Notable people with the surname include:

- Andrea Padula (born 1996), Swiss footballer
- Edward Padula (1916–2001), American theatre producer
- Gianluca Lapadula (born 1990), Peruvian footballer
- Gino Padula (born 1976), Argentine footballer
- Guillermo Padula (born 1997), Uruguayan footballer
- Leonard J. LaPadula, American computer security researcher, namesake of the Bell–LaPadula model
- Livio La Padula (born 1985), Italian rower
- Marc Lapadula (1960–2022), American playwright, screenwriter, and academic
- Mariolina Padula (died 2012), Italian mathematical physicist
- Mary L. Padula, American politician
- Oscar Padula Castro (born 1993), Uraguayan footballer
- Vicente Padula (1898–1967), Argentine film actor
