= Alexis Viera =

Uruguayan footballer (born 1978)

Personal information
- Full name: Washington Alexis Viera Barreto
- Date of birth: 18 October 1978 (age 48)
- Place of birth: Montevideo, Uruguay
- Height: 1.81 m (5 ft 11 in)
- Position: Goalkeeper

Senior career*
Years	Team	Apps	(Gls)
1995	Racing Club de Montevideo		
1996	Peñarol	0	(0)
1998–2002	Racing Club de Montevideo	38+	(0)
2003–2005	River Plate de Montevideo	41	(0)
2006–2008	Nacional	54	(0)
2009–2010	América de Cali	25	(1)
2010–2012	Ñublense	62	(0)
2013–2015	América de Cali	80	(7)
2015	Dépor	5	(0)
Total		305	(8)
- * Club domestic league appearances and goals as of 22 February 2016

Washington Alexis Viera Barreto (born 18 October 1978), commonly known as Alexis Viera, is a retired Uruguayan footballer who played as a goalkeeper. He holds Italian citizenship. Currently, he is assistant coach of his last club Atlético F.C. (previously Dépor).

== Club career ==
Viera began his career in Uruguayan Segunda División club Racing Club de Montevideo in 1995. The next year, Viera was transferred to Peñarol, with which he won the 1996 Uruguayan Primera División, with just 18 years old. In 1998 Viera returns to Racing Club de Montevideo, who was promoted to the Primera División in 2000, but was relegated back to the Segunda División in 2002.

In 2003, he is acquired by River Plate de Montevideo, with which he won the 2004 Segunda División. Viera was transferred to Nacional in 2006, with which he won 2005–06 Uruguayan Primera División. Viera's performance against Boca Juniors in the 2006 Copa Sudamericana allowed his team to advance to the quarterfinals, where they was eliminated by Atlético Paranaense.

Viera was acquired by Colombian club América de Cali in 2009, but it was not until 4 October that debuted for the team, against Deportivo Pereira, due to an injury that kept him from playing. Viera scored his first professional goal on 3 April 2010 from penalty kick, in the match against Millonarios that ended in a 3–2 win. At that same match Viera saves two penalties, which was admired by several Colombian media. Viera left the club in the middle of the year due to lack of payment, caused by the economic crisis in which the team was.

In August 2010, Viera was acquired by the Chilean club Ñublense, with which was runner-up of the 2012 Primera División B. In 2013, Viera returns to América de Cali, where scored 4 goals, all from penalty kick, reaching 5 goals with the team and so tying with Julio César Falcioni in the most goalscoring goalkeeper of the team. He scored a total of 7 goals with América de Cali. In mid-2015, he joins Colombian Primera B club Dépor.

On 25 August 2015 he was attacked and shot twice in the chest by robbers and sustained injuries to his lung and thoracic vertebra, which briefly left him unable to use his legs. He is currently undergoing recovery in Cali where he reunited with family members he had not seen since being shot. After half a year without playing, Viera retired from professional football and became assistant coach of his last club.

== Career statistics ==
This table is incomplete, thus some stats and totals could be incorrect.

Club performance			League		Cup		Continental		Total	
Season	Club	League	Apps	Goals	Apps	Goals	Apps	Goals	Apps	Goals
Uruguay			League		Cup		South America		Total	
1996	Peñarol	Uruguayan Primera División	0	0	0	0	-		0	0
1997	Peñarol	Uruguayan Primera División	0	0	0	0	-		0	0
2001	Racing Club de Montevideo	Uruguayan Primera División	11	0	0	0	0	0	11	0
2002	Racing Club de Montevideo	Uruguayan Segunda División	27	0	0	0	0	0	27	0
2003	River Plate de Montevideo	Uruguayan Segunda División	0	0	0	0	0	0	0	0
2004	River Plate de Montevideo	Uruguayan Segunda División	12	0	0	0	0	0	12	0
2005	River Plate de Montevideo	Uruguayan Primera División	16	0	0	0	0	0	16	0
2005–06	River Plate de Montevideo	Uruguayan Primera División	13	0	0	0	0	0	13	0
2005–06	Nacional	Uruguayan Primera División	3	0	0	0	0	0	3	0
2006–07	Nacional	Uruguayan Primera División	16	0	0	0	6	0	22	0
2007–08	Nacional	Uruguayan Primera División	28	0	0	0	8	0	36	0
2008–09	Nacional	Uruguayan Primera División	7	0	0	0	0	0	7	0
Colombia			League		Cup		South America		Total	
2009	América de Cali	Categoría Primera A	7	0	-		0	0	7	0
2010	América de Cali	Categoría Primera A	18	1	-		0	0	18	1
Chile			League		Cup		South America		Total	
2010	Ñublense	Chilean Primera División	14	0	2	0	-		16	0
2011	Ñublense	Chilean Primera División	15	0	0	0	0	0	15	0
2012	Ñublense	Chilean Primera División B	33	0	1	0	0	0	34	0
Colombia			League		Cup		South America		Total	
2013	América de Cali	Categoría Primera B	41	5	3	0	0	0	44	5
2014	América de Cali	Categoría Primera B	29	2	1	0	0	0	30	2
2015	América de Cali	Categoría Primera B	10	0	2	0	0	0	12	0
2015	Dépor	Categoría Primera B	5	0	0	0	0	0	5	0
Total	Chile		62	0	3	0	0	0	65	0
Total	Colombia		110	8	6	0	0	0	116	8
Total	Uruguay		133	0	0	0	14	0	147	0
Total	Career total		305	8	9	0	14	0	328	8

== Honours ==
Nacional

- Primera División (1): 2005–06

Ñublense

- Primera División B

Runner-up (1): 2012

Peñarol

- Primera División (1): 1996

River Plate de Montevideo

- Segunda División (1): 2004

== See also ==
- List of goalscoring goalkeepers
