= Roberto Brum =

Roberto Brum may refer to:

- Roberto Brum (footballer, born 1978), Brazilian footballer
- Roberto Brum (footballer, born 1983), Uruguayan footballer
