= Mauricio Victorino =

Uruguayan footballer (born 1982)

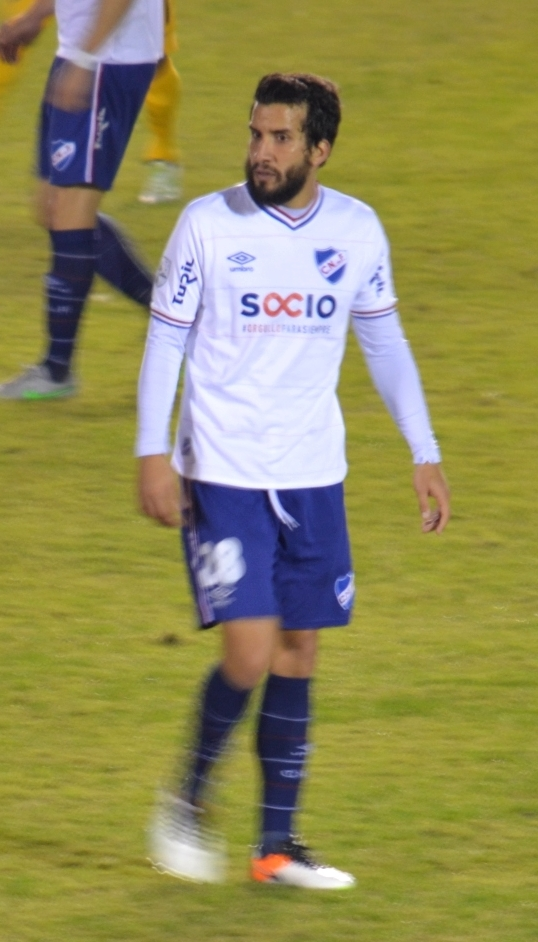

Personal information
- Full name: Mauricio Bernardo Victorino Dansilio
- Date of birth: 11 October 1982 (age 44)
- Place of birth: Montevideo, Uruguay
- Height: 1.82 m (6 ft 0 in)
- Position: Centre back

Team information
- Current team: Nacional (assistant coach)

Youth career
- Nacional

Senior career*
Years	Team	Apps	(Gls)
2004–2006	Nacional	51	(1)
2004	→ Plaza Colonia (loan)	16	(3)
2006–2007	Veracruz	28	(3)
2007–2009	Nacional	45	(8)
2009–2011	Universidad de Chile	37	(5)
2011–2014	Cruzeiro	24	(0)
2014	→ Palmeiras (loan)	7	(0)
2015	Independiente	10	(1)
2016–2017	Nacional	24	(0)
2017–2018	Cerro Porteño	12	(0)
2019–2021	Danubio	22	(1)
Total		276	(22)

International career
2006–2016	Uruguay	24	(0)

Managerial career
- 2023: Liverpool (assistant)
- 2024: León (assistant)
- 2024–: Nacional (assistant)
Medal record
Representing Uruguay
Copa América
Winner	2011 Argentina	Team
- * Club domestic league appearances and goals

Mauricio Bernardo Victorino Dansilo (Spanish pronunciation: [mawˈɾisjo βeɾˈnaɾðo βiɣtoˈɾino ðanˈsilo]; born 11 October 1982) is a Uruguayan football coach and a former defender. He is an assistant manager with Nacional.

== Club career ==
=== Nacional ===
He made his debut for Nacional in a Copa Libertadores match against Argentine River Plate on 3 March 2005. His uncle Waldemar Victorino had also previously played for Nacional.

=== Veracruz ===
In August 2006 he was transferred one season to Veracruz where he played in the Mexican Primera División. In July 2007 he returned to Nacional.

=== Universidad de Chile ===
On 1 August 2009, he was transferred to Universidad de Chile after an excellent campaign with Nacional in the 2009 Copa Libertadores and the 2008–09. He scored his first goal as a Universidad de Chile player, after a left-footed shot, on August 30, 2009, in a game against Audax Italiano.

=== Cruzeiro ===
Victorino joined Brazilian club Cruzeiro on 1 February 2011.

=== Danubio ===
After a spending the 2018–19 season without a club as a penalty for testing positive to PEDs, it was announced on August 17, 2019, that Victorino had joined hometown club Danubio F.C.

== National team ==
Victorino played on the Uruguay national team in the 2010 FIFA World Cup. In the shoot out against Ghana, he scored the second penalty kick for Uruguay in the World Cup quarterfinals on July 2, 2010. The goal was one of four that sent Uruguay to the semi-finals for the first time in 40 years.

In 2011, he won the Copa América playing 2 matches.

In 2016, he returned to the national team, after an absence of more than three years.

== Honors ==
=== Club ===
Nacional

- Primera División Uruguaya: 2005, 2005–06, 2008–09

Universidad de Chile

- Primera División de Chile (1): 2011 Apertura

Cruzeiro

- Campeonato Mineiro: 2011
- Campeonato Brasileiro Série A: 2013

=== International ===
Uruguay

- Copa América: 2011
