= Pablo Caballero (footballer, born January 1987) =

Uruguayan footballer

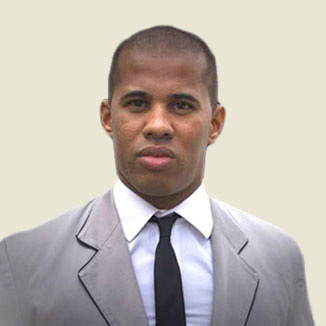

Personal information
- Full name: Pablo Sebastián Caballero González
- Date of birth: January 21, 1987 (age 39)
- Place of birth: Minas, Uruguay
- Height: 1.79 m (5 ft 10 in)
- Position: Midfielder

Senior career*
Years	Team	Apps	(Gls)
2004–2009	Nacional	57	(3)
2009–2012	Locarno	21	(1)
2010	→ Vasas (loan)	12	(0)
2010–2011	→ Eupen (loan)	10	(0)
2012	Botev Vratsa	2	(0)
- * Club domestic league appearances and goals as of November 17, 2012

Pablo Caballero (born 21 January 1987 in Minas, Uruguay) is a Uruguayan footballer.

== Club career ==
He made his professional debut against Liverpool on 29 August 2004 at the age of 17.

In February 2010, he was loaned to Vasas SC of Hungary for six months. The following six months we played for K.A.S. Eupen in the Belgian Pro League.

== Honours ==
=== Club ===
Nacional

- Primera División Uruguaya: 2005–06, 2008–09.
- Liguilla Pre-Libertadores 2007
