= Sebastián Vázquez (footballer) =

Uruguayan footballer (born 1980)

Personal information
- Full name: Sebastián Rodrigo Vázquez Maidana
- Date of birth: 4 November 1980 (age 45)
- Place of birth: San Ramón, Uruguay
- Height: 1.84 m (6 ft 0 in)
- Position: Midfielder

Youth career
- Rentistas

Senior career*
Years	Team	Apps	(Gls)
2000–2002	Rentistas	63	(5)
2003–2004	Liverpool Montevideo	43	(11)
2005–2006	Nacional	40	(9)
2007	Estudiantes LP	11	(0)
2007–2010	Chornomorets Odesa	50	(10)
2009	→ Liverpool Montevideo (loan)	12	(2)
2010	Beitar Jerusalem	8	(0)
2010–2011	Danubio	9	(0)
2011	→ Hangzhou Greentown (loan)	22	(1)
2012	Cerro Largo	12	(1)
2012–2013	Peñarol	2	(0)
2013–2014	Rentistas	26	(2)
2014	Sol de América	7	(0)
2015	Cerro Largo	12	(0)
2015–2016	Rentistas	27	(1)
2016–2017	Cerro Largo	20	(1)
2018	Rentistas	19	(4)

International career
2005	Uruguay	1	(0)

Managerial career
- 2022: Cerrito (assistant)
- 2023: Montevideo City Torque (youth)
- 2024–2025: General Caballero JLM (reserves)
- 2025: General Caballero JLM
- * Club domestic league appearances and goals

Sebastián Rodrigo Vázquez Maidana (Latin American Spanish: [seβasˈtjam ˈbaskes]; (Note: In isolation, Sebastián is pronounced [seβasˈtjan].) born 4 November 1980) is an Uruguayan football manager and former player who played as a midfielder.

== Club career ==
Born in San Ramón, Vázquez began his career in 2000 with Rentistas, in 2003 he moved to Liverpool de Montevideo and in 2005 he moved to Nacional where he was part of the squad that won back to back league championships.

In 2007 Vázquez joined reigning Argentine champions Estudiantes de la Plata. On August 28, 2007, he signed with FC Chornomorets Odesa. In February 2009 he returned to Liverpool de Montevideo on loan. In the summer of 2009 he returned to Chornomorets Odesa, where he played for half season until moving to Beitar Jerusalem. In August 2010 he signed with Danubio, which plays in the Primera División Uruguaya.

Vázquez moved to Hangzhou Greentown on a two years loan deal in January 2011.

In February 2012, he signed a six-month deal with Cerro Largo FC.

== Titles ==
Season	Club	Title
2005	Nacional	Primera División Uruguaya
2005-06	Nacional	Primera División Uruguaya

On July 3, 2012, he moved to Atlético Junior of Barranquilla, Colombia
