= Diego Arismendi =

Uruguayan footballer (born 1988)

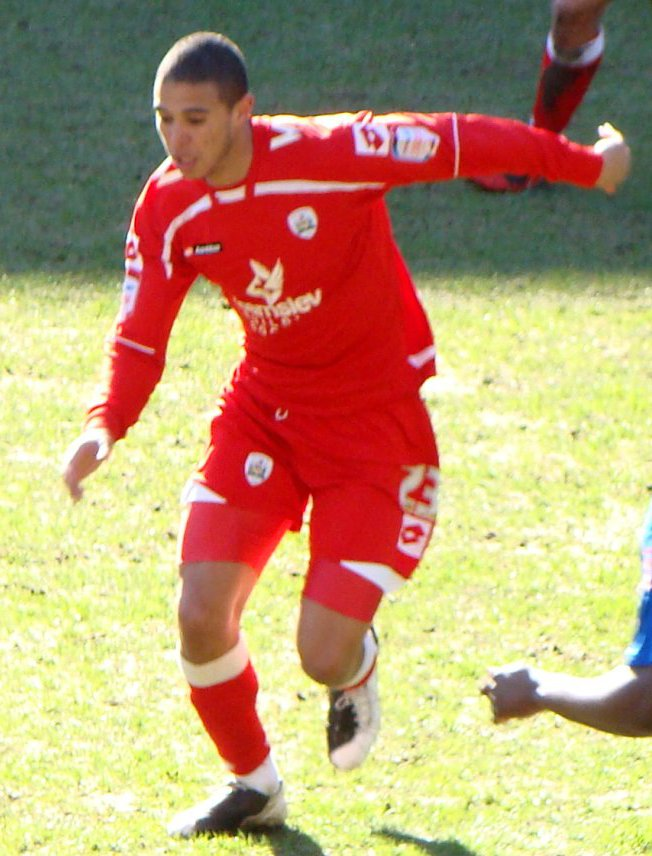
- Arismendi playing for Barnsley

Personal information
- Full name: Hugo Diego Arismendi Ciapparetta
- Date of birth: 25 January 1988 (age 38)
- Place of birth: Montevideo, Uruguay
- Height: 1.89 m (6 ft 2 in)
- Position: Midfielder

Team information
- Current team: Rampla Juniors
- Number: 32

Senior career*
Years	Team	Apps	(Gls)
2006–2009	Nacional	55	(2)
2009–2012	Stoke City	0	(0)
2010	→ Brighton & Hove Albion (loan)	6	(0)
2010–2011	→ Barnsley (loan)	31	(1)
2012	→ Huddersfield Town (loan)	9	(0)
2013–2015	Nacional	56	(9)
2015–2016	Al-Shabab	26	(2)
2016–2018	Nacional	51	(3)
2018	Rosario Central	4	(0)
2019–2020	Racing Montevideo	33	(2)
2020–2022	Montevideo City Torque	79	(4)
2023	Sud América	13	(0)
2023	Fénix	12	(0)
2024	Terremoto		
2024–	Rampla Juniors	2	(0)

International career
2008–2014	Uruguay	4	(0)
- * Club domestic league appearances and goals as of 14 September 2024

Hugo Diego Arismendi Ciapparetta (born 25 January 1988) is a Uruguayan footballer who plays as a midfielder for Rampla Juniors.

Arismendi began his career with Nacional, one of Uruguay's leading clubs. His performances for Nacional in the Copa Libertadores earned him a call up to the Uruguay national team and to the attention of clubs in Europe. English Premier League side Stoke City signed Arismendi a fee of £2.6 million becoming the club's first South American player. However at Stoke he failed to make any impact and was only included in cup and European matches. He also spent time out on loan at Brighton & Hove Albion, Barnsley and Huddersfield Town. After ending his unsuccessful time in England he returned to Uruguay.

== Career ==
On 29 August 2009 it was reported that Arismendi had agreed personal terms and passed a medical with Stoke City. It was then announced late on 31 August 2009 that he had signed for a fee of £2.6 million possibly rising to £4.8 million. Arismendi made his Stoke debut in a 4–3 win over Blackpool in the League Cup on 22 September 2009. He was substituted at half-time due to an injury.

On 2 March 2010 Arismendi joined League One side Brighton & Hove Albion on loan linking up with fellow country man Gus Poyet. His time on the south coast was overshadowed by injury as he endured a miserable time which ended with a red card against MK Dons in his final game for the club. On 12 July 2010 Arismendi joined championship side Barnsley on a season long loan. He scored his first goal in English football against Leeds United in a 5–2 win for Barnsley. He returned to Stoke at the start of the 2011–12 season and while he has made the matchday squad a few occasions he has remained as an used substitute. He did make four appearances in the away matches in the UEFA Europa League including their final match against Valencia.

He joined Huddersfield Town on loan on 16 March 2012 until the end of the season. He made his debut for the "Terriers" the following day as a substitute in their 1–1 draw at Colchester United at the Colchester Community Stadium. His first start for the club came in the 1–0 home victory over league leaders Charlton Athletic on 24 March 2012.

Arismendi was left out of Stoke's 25-man squad for the 2012–13 season leaving his future certain to be away from the Britannia Stadium. His contract at Stoke was terminated at the end of November 2012 bringing an end to a poor three years at the club in which he managed just six appearances none of which came in a Premier League match. He returned to Uruguay and re-signed for Nacional.

== International career ==
He received his first international cap in a friendly match against Norway on 28 May 2008 followed up by his second in a World Cup qualifier against Bolivia both games finished 2–2.

== Personal life ==
While living in England, Arismendi was branded a 'noise pest' after forcing his neighbour to move due to hosting late night parties.

== Career statistics ==
=== Club ===
As of 15 September 2021

Appearances and goals by club, season and competition
Club	Season	League			Cup		League Cup		Continental		Total	
Club	Season	Division	Apps	Goals	Apps	Goals	Apps	Goals	Apps	Goals	Apps	Goals
Nacional	2006–07	Uruguayan Primera División	10	0	—		—		0	0	10	0
Nacional	2007–08	Uruguayan Primera División	21	1	—		—		13	1	34	2
Nacional	2008–09	Uruguayan Primera División	24	1	—		—		10	1	34	2
Nacional	Total		55	2	—		–|		23	2	78	4
Stoke City	2009–10	Premier League	0	0	0	0	2	0	—		2	0
Stoke City	2010–11	Premier League	0	0	0	0	0	0	—		0	0
Stoke City	2011–12	Premier League	0	0	0	0	0	0	4	0	4	0
Stoke City	2012–13	Premier League	0	0	0	0	0	0	—		0	0
Stoke City	Total		0	0	0	0	2	0	4	0	6	0
Brighton & Hove Albion (loan)	2009–10	League One	6	0	0	0	0	0	—		6	0
Barnsley (loan)	2010–11	Championship	31	1	1	0	0	0	—		32	1
Huddersfield Town (loan)	2010–11	League One	9	0	0	0	0	0	—		9	0
Nacional	2012–13	Uruguayan Primera División	11	1	—		—		5	0	16	1
Nacional	2013–14	Uruguayan Primera División	22	3	—		—		3	0	25	3
Nacional	2014–15	Uruguayan Primera División	23	5	—		—		2	0	25	5
Nacional	Total		56	9	—		—		10	0	66	9
Al-Shabab	2015–16	Saudi Professional League	26	2	1	0	3	0	0	0	30	2
Nacional	2016	Uruguayan Primera División	11	0	—		—		0	0	11	0
Nacional	2017	Uruguayan Primera División	11	1	—		—		3	0	14	1
Nacional	Total		22	1	—		—		3	0	25	1
Rosario Central	2018–19	Argentine Primera División	4	0	2	0	—		—		6	0
Racing Montevideo	2019	Uruguayan Primera División	33	2	—		—		—		33	2
Montevideo City Torque	2020	Uruguayan Primera División	33	2	—		—		—		33	2
Montevideo City Torque	2021	Uruguayan Primera División	25	0	—		—		8	0	33	0
Montevideo City Torque	Total		37	1	—		—		8	0	45	1
Career total			278	18	4	0	5	0	48	2	336	20

=== International ===
National team	Year	Apps	Goals
Uruguay	2008	2	0
Uruguay	2014	2	0
Total		4	0
