= Marc Lapadula =

American dramatist (1960–2022)

- Born: April 22, 1960
- Died: August 9, 2022 (aged 62)
- Education: University of Pennsylvania (BA); University of East Anglia (MA); University of Iowa (MFA)

Marc Andrew Lapadula (April 22, 1960 – August 9, 2022) was an American playwright, screenwriter and senior lecturer in Film Studies at Yale University, where he led the screenwriting program.

== Education ==
Lapadula held a BA from University of Pennsylvania, where he studied English and Irish drama, as well as an MA from Malcolm Bradbury’s Creative Writing Workshop at the University of East Anglia. He also had a MFA from the Iowa Playwrights’ Workshop at the University of Iowa.

== Work ==
Lapadula was a playwright whose works were produced in New York, England, Pennsylvania, Iowa, Baltimore, and Washington, D.C. His stage plays included Not by Name, Two Shakes, Old Young Men, Men Like Us, The Rains Change, Serial and In Uniform Thanksgiving, an absurdist comedy in the Joe Orton tradition. He also had several original screenplays commissioned or optioned, including Distant Influence, Night Bloom, and At Risk. Lapadula also had screen adaptations of Mikhail Bulgakov’s Heart of a Dog and Miguel de Unamuno’s Saint Emmanuel the Good, Martyr. One of Lapadula's last feature-length screenplays, Person of Interest, was a work-in-progress as of 2016.

Lapadula's producing credits included Angel Passing, which starred Hume Cronyn and Teresa Wright and premiered at the Sundance Film Festival, and the film Mentor, which starred Rutger Hauer and premiered at the Tribeca Film Festival.

Additionally, Lapadula acted as a consultant for film producers and studios, including New Line Cinema.

== Teaching ==
Lapadula taught introductory, intermediate and advanced seminars on screenwriting at Yale from 1992. Before Yale, he taught screenwriting, playwriting and film analysis courses at Johns Hopkins, University of Pennsylvania, and the Graduate Film School at Columbia University. He also taught public speaking to New York City Police Officers, Fire Personnel and Correctional Officials at The John Jay College of Criminal Justice.

== Personal style ==
Lapadula's favorite films included I Am a Fugitive From a Chain Gang, The Graduate, Easy Rider, The China Syndrome, and Steven Spielberg's Jaws. These films, in his estimation, have had a strong impact on American cinema and culture, while cutting at the heart of meaningful social issues and iniquities in American society.

Lapadula's teaching style was described as hands on, with his lectures evolving in a free form and intuitive manner. Though the work load and expectations in his courses, according to former students, could be demanding, he was known for his genuine care for his students and desire to inspire them to continue their development as writers.
