= Adrián Romero (Uruguayan footballer) =

Uruguayan footballer (born 1977)

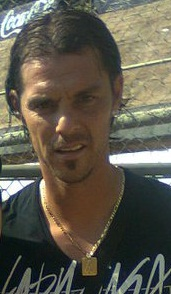

Personal information
- Full name: Adrián Marcelo Romero González
- Date of birth: June 25, 1977 (age 49)
- Place of birth: Montevideo, Uruguay
- Height: 1.80 m (5 ft 11 in)
- Positions: Centre back; left back

Senior career*
Years	Team	Apps	(Gls)
1999–2003	Cerro	157	(16)
2004	Nacional Montevideo	13	(1)
2004–2005	Estudiantes de La Plata	24	(1)
2005–2006	Tiro Federal	26	(1)
2006–2009	Nacional Montevideo	55	(5)
2009–2011	Querétaro	62	(2)
2011–2012	Olimpia Asunción	34	(5)
2012–2013	Nacional Montevideo	19	(1)
2013–2014	Cerro Largo	13	(3)
2014	Miramar Misiones	9	(0)

International career
2003–2004	Uruguay	8	(1)
- * Club domestic league appearances and goals

Adrián Marcelo Romero González (born June 25, 1977) is a retired Uruguayan football defender.

== Club career ==
Romero started his playing career in 1999 with Cerro and in 2004 he joined Nacional.

Romero moved to Argentina in 2004 where he played with Estudiantes de La Plata and then Tiro Federal. In 2006, he returned to Uruguay to rejoin Nacional.

== International career ==
Between 2003 and 2004 Romero played in 8 games for the Uruguay national team, on November 15, 2003, he scored the winning goal in a World Cup qualifier against Chile, and in the next game against Brazil on November 19 he was the captain of the Uruguayan team.
