= Damián Malrechauffe =

Uruguayan footballer (born 1984)

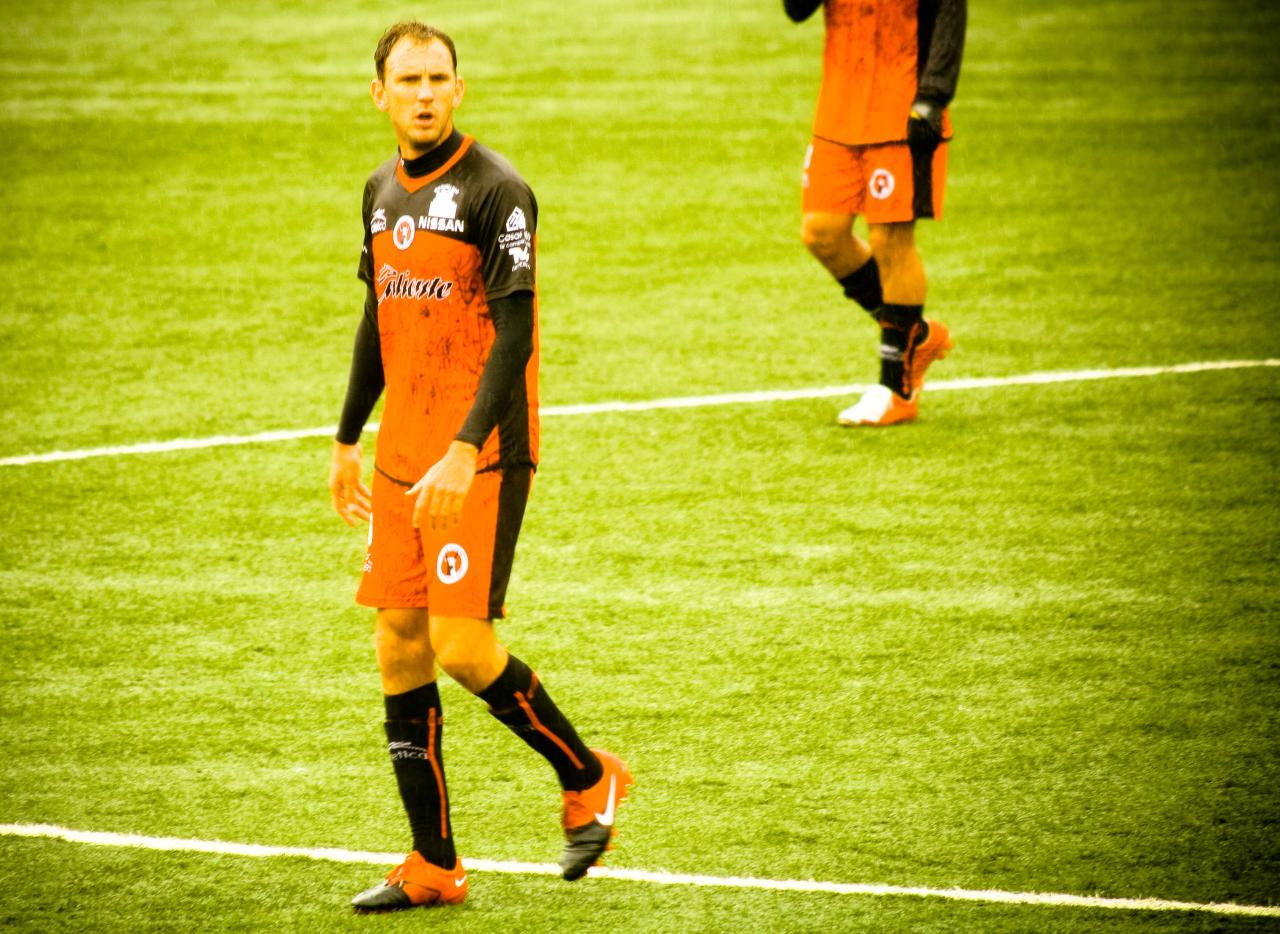

Personal information
- Full name: Damián Alejandro Malrechauffe Verdún
- Date of birth: 19 October 1984 (age 42)
- Place of birth: Montevideo, Uruguay
- Height: 1.86 m (6 ft 1 in)
- Position: Centre back

Senior career*
Years	Team	Apps	(Gls)
2004–2013	Danubio	83	(6)
2009–2010	→ Tijuana (loan)	24	(0)
2012–2013	→ Cúcuta Deportivo (loan)	27	(2)
2013	→ Colo-Colo (loan)	3	(0)
2013–2015	Racing Montevideo	23	(5)
2015–2016	Quilmes	26	(1)
2016–2017	Danubio	46	(1)
2018	Racing Montevideo	19	(0)
2019–2021	Rentistas	51	(2)

Managerial career
- 2022: Rentistas (assistant)
- 2022: Villa Española (assistant)
- * Club domestic league appearances and goals

Damián Malrechauffe Verdún (born 19 October 1984) is a Uruguayan football coach and a former player.
