= 1996 Campeonato Uruguayo Primera División =

93rd season of the top-tier football league in Uruguay

Statistics of Primera División Uruguaya for the 1996 season.

== Overview ==
It was contested by 12 teams, and Peñarol won the championship.

== Apertura ==
Pos	Team	Pld	W	D	L	GF	GA	GD	Pts
1	Peñarol	11	7	2	2	21	11	+10	23
2	Defensor Sporting	11	6	4	1	17	8	+9	22
3	Nacional	11	6	3	2	25	11	+14	21
4	Danubio	11	5	4	2	12	9	+3	19
5	Huracán Buceo	11	5	3	3	13	11	+2	18
6	Rampla Juniors	11	3	5	3	9	9	0	14
7	Cerro	11	3	4	4	13	15	−2	13
8	River Plate	11	2	5	4	11	13	−2	11
9	Montevideo Wanderers	11	3	2	6	7	17	−10	11
10	Liverpool	11	2	4	5	8	13	−5	10
11	Sud América	11	1	5	5	5	17	−12	8
12	Central Español	11	1	3	7	8	15	−7	6

Source: rsssf.com

== Clausura ==
Pos	Team	Pld	W	D	L	GF	GA	GD	Pts
1	Nacional	11	8	1	2	23	12	+11	25
2	Rampla Juniors	11	4	6	1	9	6	+3	18
3	Huracán Buceo	11	4	6	1	8	6	+2	18
4	Defensor Sporting	11	4	5	2	13	9	+4	17
5	Danubio	11	5	2	4	17	17	0	17
6	Peñarol	11	4	3	4	22	17	+5	15
7	Central Español	11	3	5	3	8	9	−1	14
8	River Plate	11	3	4	4	14	13	+1	13
9	Montevideo Wanderers	11	3	4	4	8	14	−6	13
10	Cerro	11	2	6	3	11	16	−5	12
11	Liverpool	11	2	6	3	9	14	−5	12
12	Sud América	11	0	0	11	0	9	−9	0

Source: rsssf.com

== Overall ==
Pos	Team	Pld	W	D	L	GF	GA	GD	Pts
1	Nacional	22	14	4	4	48	23	+25	46
2	Defensor Sporting	22	10	9	3	30	17	+13	39
3	Peñarol	22	11	5	6	43	28	+15	38
4	Danubio	22	10	6	6	29	26	+3	36
5	Huracán Buceo	22	9	9	4	21	17	+4	36
6	Rampla Juniors	22	7	11	4	18	15	+3	32
7	Montevideo Wanderers	22	6	6	10	15	31	−16	24
8	River Plate	22	5	9	8	25	26	−1	24
9	Liverpool	22	4	10	8	17	27	−10	22
10	Cerro	22	5	10	7	24	31	−7	20 (Note: 5 points deducted?)
11	Central Español	22	4	8	10	16	24	−8	20
12	Sud América	22	1	5	16	5	26	−21	8

Source: rsssf.com

== Playoff ==
- Peñarol 1-0 ; 1-1 Nacional

Peñarol won the championship.
