= Gerardo Acosta =

Uruguayan football defender (born 1984)

Personal information
- Full name: Gerardo Daniel Acosta Mateuci
- Date of birth: 22 February 1984 (age 42)
- Place of birth: Montevideo, Uruguay
- Height: 1.78 m (5 ft 10 in)
- Position: Defender

Team information
- Current team: Villa Española

Senior career*
Years	Team	Apps	(Gls)
2005–2007	Sportivo Cerrito		
2007–2008	Nacional	26	(0)
2009	Bella Vista	10	
2009–2010	Fénix	17	(1)
2010–2011	San Martín de San Juan		
2012–2013	Patronato de Paraná		
2013–2014	Belgrano		
2013–2014	Villa Española		
- * Club domestic league appearances and goals

Gerardo Daniel Acosta Mateuci (born February 22, 1984) is a Uruguayan football defender currently playing for Sportivo Belgrano of the Primera B Nacional in Argentina.
