= Pablo Gaglianone =

Uruguayan footballer (born 1976)

Personal information
- Full name: Pablo Daniel Gaglianone De León
- Date of birth: 25 April 1976 (age 50)
- Place of birth: Montevideo, Uruguay
- Height: 1.80 m (5 ft 11 in)
- Position: Midfielder

Team information
- Current team: Montevideo City Torque (youth manager)

Senior career*
Years	Team	Apps	(Gls)
1994–1998	River Plate Montevideo		
1998	Torino	1	(0)
1999	Kavala	2	(0)
2000	River Plate Montevideo		
2000	Deportivo Maldonado	5	(2)
2000	Colo-Colo	12	(3)
2001	Danubio	38	(3)
2002	Peñarol	48	(3)
2003	Olimpia	0	(0)
2004	Liverpool Montevideo	33	(1)
2005	Peñarol	1	(0)
2006	Once Caldas	33	(4)
2007	Rampla Juniors	14	(1)
2007–2010	Defensor Sporting	84	(15)
2010–2012	River Plate Montevideo	32	(5)

Managerial career
- 2014–2016: Danubio (youth)
- 2016: Danubio
- 2016–2018: Danubio (youth)
- 2023–: Montevideo City Torque (youth)
- 2024: Montevideo City Torque (interim)
- * Club domestic league appearances and goals

Pablo Daniel Gaglianone De León (born 25 April 1976) is a Uruguayan football manager and former player who played as a midfielder. He is the current manager of Montevideo City Torque's youth sides.

== Club career ==
Gaglianone began his professional career with Defensor Sporting and has played for several clubs in Uruguay and South America. He also had brief spells abroad: with Torino F.C. in Serie B and Kavala in the Super League Greece along with compatriot Hernán Rodrigo López.

In 2000, Gaglianone had a stint with Chilean club Colo-Colo.

He helped Defensor Sporting win the 2007–08 Uruguayan Primera División, defeating C.A. Peñarol in the finals.
