= Federico Pérez =

Uruguayan footballer (born 1986)

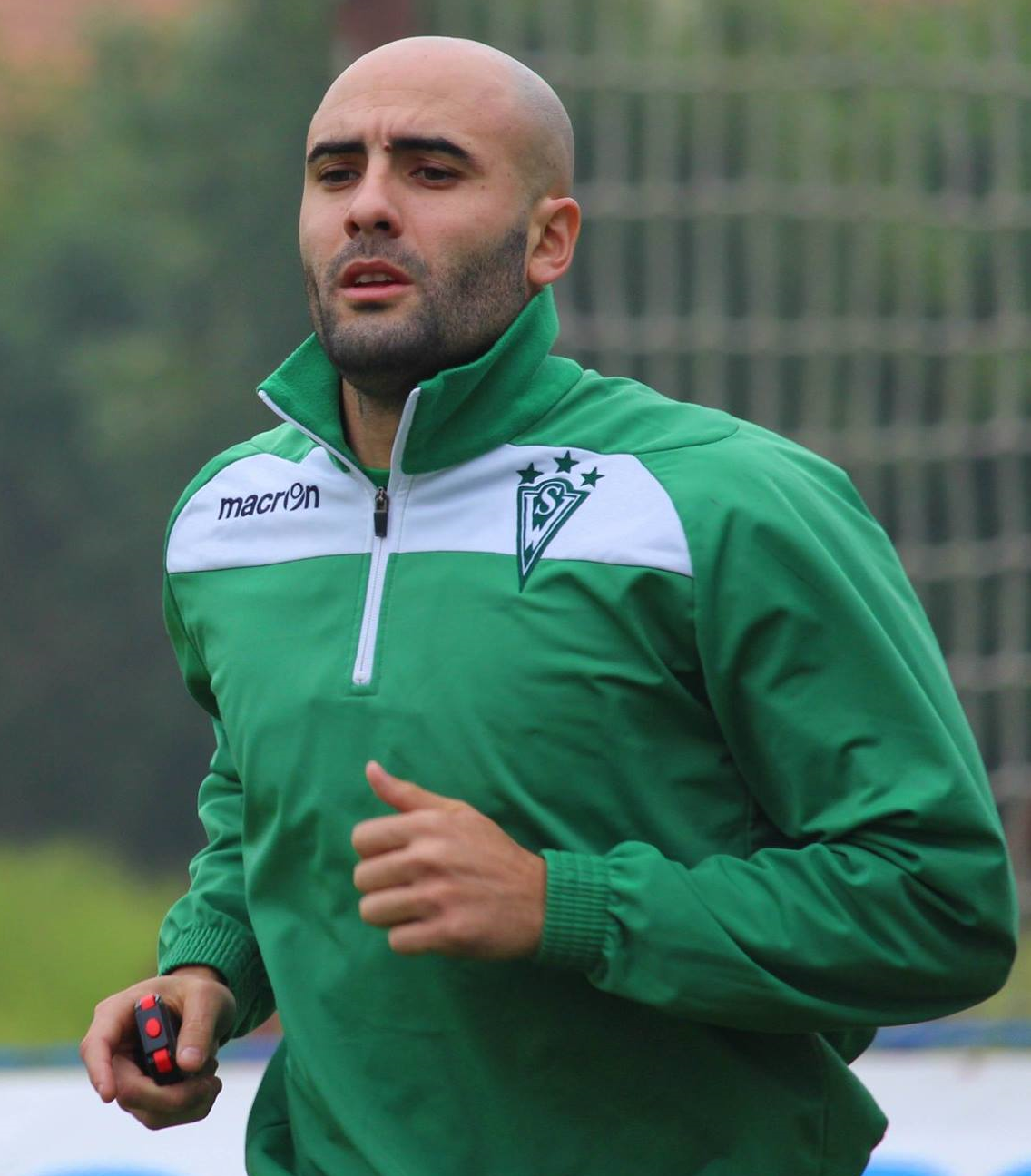
- Pérez with Santiago Wanderers in 2016

Personal information
- Full name: Federico Pérez Silvera
- Date of birth: January 23, 1986 (age 40)
- Place of birth: Montevideo, Uruguay
- Height: 1.80 m (5 ft 11 in)
- Position: Left back

Youth career
- Bella Vista

Senior career*
Years	Team	Apps	(Gls)
2004–2007	Bella Vista	42	(0)
2008	Peñarol	9	(0)
2009–2010	Everton	5	(0)
2010–2011	River Plate Montevideo	7	(1)
2011–2012	Bella Vista	14	(0)
2012–2013	Sud América	23	(1)
2013–2014	Plaza Colonia	38	(1)
2015–2016	Santamarina	21	(1)
2016–2017	Atlanta	15	(2)
2016–2017	→ Santiago Wanderers (loan)	23	(0)
2017	Plaza Colonia	13	(1)
2018	Cobreloa	6	(0)
2018–2020	Plaza Colonia	75	(6)
2021	Atenas	14	(0)
2022	Plaza Colonia	6	(1)
- * Club domestic league appearances and goals

Federico Pérez Silvera (born January 23, 1986, in Montevideo, Uruguay) is a Uruguayan former footballer who played as a defender.

== Career ==
In Chile, Pérez had stints with Everton in 2009–10, Santiago Wanderers in 2016–17 and Cobreloa in 2018.

== Honours ==
Sud América

- Uruguayan Segunda División: 2012–13
