= Marcelo Martuciello =

Uruguayan footballer (born 1976)

Marcelo Andrés Martuciello (born December 22, 1976, in Montevideo, Uruguay) is a Uruguayan footballer.

== Teams ==
- (Uruguay) Deportivo Maldonado 1999–2000
- (Mexico) Querétaro 2000–2001
- (Uruguay) Deportivo Maldonado 2002–2003
- (Uruguay) Fénix 2003–2004
- (Uruguay) Tacuarembó 2005
- (Guatemala) Comunicaciones 2006
- (Uruguay) Miramar Misiones 2006–2007
- (Peru) Sporting Cristal 2007
- (Uruguay) Miramar Misiones 2008–2011
- (Uruguay) Bella Vista 2011–2013
