= Jonathan Blanes =

Uruguayan footballer (born 1987)

Personal information
- Full name: Jonathan Blanes Núñez
- Date of birth: March 10, 1987 (age 39)
- Place of birth: Montevideo, Uruguay
- Height: 1.75 m (5 ft 9 in)
- Position: Attacking midfielder

Youth career
- –2007: Racing Club

Senior career*
Years	Team	Apps	(Gls)
2007–2009	Racing Club	13	(3)
2009–2010	Atlético Tucumán	5	(1)
2010–2011	→ Liverpool (loan)	16	(2)
2012–2014	Juventud	29	(10)
2014–2017	River Plate	0	(0)
- * Club domestic league appearances and goals as of March 23, 2016 ‡ National team caps and goals as of March 23, 2016

Jonathan Blanes Núñez (born March 10, 1987, in Paysandú) is a Uruguayan professional footballer who plays as an attacking midfielder for River Plate in the Uruguayan Primera División.

== Honours ==
=== Club ===
Racing Club

- 2007-2008 Uruguayan Segunda División championship
