= Alejandro Rodríguez (footballer, born 1986) =

Uruguayan footballer (born 1986)

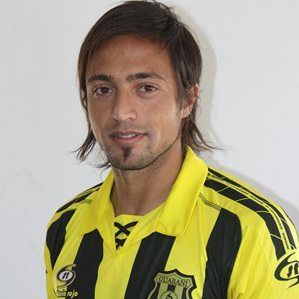

Personal information
- Full name: Alejandro Javier Rodríguez Morales
- Date of birth: July 9, 1986 (age 40)
- Place of birth: Pando, Uruguay
- Height: 1.80 m (5 ft 11 in)
- Position: Centre back

Youth career
- Nacional Montevideo

Senior career*
Years	Team	Apps	(Gls)
2007–2009	Nacional Montevideo	13	(0)
2008	→ Rampla Juniors (loan)	12	(0)
2010	Plaza Colonia	10	(1)
2011	Deportivo Malacateco	?	(0)
2011–2012	El Tanque Sisley	14	(0)
2012–2013	Guaraní	1	(0)
2013–2014	Rampla Juniors	17	(1)
2014	Manta	19	(0)
2015	Rampla Juniors	13	(1)
2015	Ermis Aradippou	0	(0)
2015	Cerrito		
2016	Plaza Colonia	4	(0)
2016	Torque	9	(0)
2017–2018	Cerrito	39	(1)

International career
2003	Uruguay U-17		
- * Club domestic league appearances and goals as of 13:51, 28 September 2020 (UTC)

Alejandro Rodríguez (born 9 July 1986 in Pando) is a Uruguayan footballer.

== Career ==
He made his debut on 17 February 2007, against Central Español.

Rodriguez played for Uruguay U-17 team at the 2003 South American Under-17 Football Championship, which was held in Bolivia.
