= Diego de Souza (footballer, born 1984) =

Uruguayan footballer

Personal information
- Full name: Diego Alejandro de Souza Carballo
- Date of birth: May 14, 1984 (age 42)
- Place of birth: Melo, Uruguay
- Height: 1.75 m (5 ft 9 in)
- Positions: Attacking midfielder; winger

Team information
- Current team: El Tanque Sisley

Senior career*
Years	Team	Apps	(Gls)
2003–2011	Defensor Sporting	97	(29)
2011–2012	Banfield	31	(5)
2012–2013	Montevideo Wanderers	16	(0)
2014	Cerro Largo	12	(0)
2014–2015	Municipal	17	(1)
2016–2017	Cerro Largo	7	(2)
2017–	El Tanque Sisley	23	(2)
2018	→ Central Español (loan)	12	(0)

International career
2007	Uruguay	3	(0)
- * Club domestic league appearances and goals as of 2 January 2018

Diego Alejandro de Souza Carballo (born 14 May 1984 in Melo) is a Uruguayan footballer. He plays for El Tanque Sisley as a midfielder. He is nicknamed "Pepe" and "El ojo".

== Club career ==
De Souza joined Defensor Sporting youth teams at the age of 16 and has since been claimed to be one of the greatest players in the history of the Uruguayan team. In 2009, he was chosen as the best player of the Uruguayan Primera División. In July 2010, Defensor Sporting received a US$1.5 million offer from Universidad de Chile which was accepted by the Uruguayan team but later turned down by de Souza's agent Gonzalo Madrid, who was hoping to place the midfielder in a European team. On 27 January 2011, Diego de Souza signed a contract with Banfield for four years.

== International career ==
He has been called up to the Uruguay national team but as an unused sub.

== Honours ==
=== Defensor Sporting ===
- Uruguayan League: 2007–08
