= Mario Risso =

Uruguayan footballer (born 1988)

Personal information
- Full name: Mario Pablo Risso Caffiro
- Date of birth: 31 January 1988 (age 38)
- Place of birth: Montevideo, Uruguay
- Height: 1.95 m (6 ft 5 in)
- Position: Centre-back

Team information
- Current team: Danubio
- Number: 4

Youth career
- Defensor Sporting

Senior career*
Years	Team	Apps	(Gls)
2008–2013	Defensor Sporting	102	(3)
2014–2015	Botafogo	1	(0)
2014	→ Náutico (loan)	9	(1)
2015	Defensor Sporting	4	(0)
2015–2017	Huracán	13	(0)
2017–2019	Celaya	18	(0)
2019–2021	Plaza Colonia	81	(4)
2021–2022	Nacional	12	(1)
2023–2024	Montevideo Wanderers	49	(2)
2025–	Danubio	10	(1)
- * Club domestic league appearances and goals as of 1 October 2025

Mario Pablo Risso Caffiro (born 31 January 1988) is a Uruguayan footballer who plays for Danubio as a centre-back.

== Honours ==
Defensor Sporting

- Torneo Clausura: 2009, 2012, 2013
- Torneo Apertura: 2010

Plaza Colonia

- Torneo Apertura: 2021 Apertura

Nacional

- Torneo Intermedio: 2022
- Torneo Clausura: 2022 Clausura
