= Pablo Pallante =

Uruguayan footballer (born 1979)

Personal information
- Full name: Pablo Antonio Pallante Mieres
- Date of birth: 14 February 1979 (age 47)
- Place of birth: Montevideo, Uruguay
- Height: 1.79 m (5 ft 10 in)
- Position: Winger

Youth career
- Montevideo Wanderers

Senior career*
Years	Team	Apps	(Gls)
1998	Montevideo Wanderers		
1999	River Plate Montevideo		
2000–2002	Deportivo Maldonado		
2003–2004	Plaza Colonia		
2005–2011	Cerro	71	(12)
2007–2008	→ Grosseto (loan)	0	(0)
2009	→ Gallipoli (loan)	18	(1)
2011–2012	Cobresal	30	(8)
2012–2013	Cerro	14	(1)
2013–2014	Miramar Misiones	24	(2)
2014–2015	Villa Española	13	(0)
- * Club domestic league appearances and goals

Pablo Antonio Pallante Mieres (born 14 February 1979 in Montevideo) is a retired Uruguayan footballer.

He went on loan to Grosseto on 16 August 2007 for the 2007–08 season and Gallipoli for the 2009–10 season.
