= Martín Rodríguez (footballer, born 1985) =

Uruguayan footballer

Personal information
- Full name: Cristian Martín Rodríguez Telis
- Date of birth: 10 February 1985 (age 41)
- Place of birth: Artigas, Uruguay
- Height: 1.76 m (5 ft 9 in)
- Position: Right back

Team information
- Current team: Villa Teresa

Senior career*
Years	Team	Apps	(Gls)
2003–2007	River Plate	89	(2)
2008	Banfield	5	(0)
2009	→ Nacional (loan)	8	(1)
2009–2011	Liverpool Montevideo	27	(2)
2011–2013	Beijing BIT	55	(7)
2014	Hebei Zhongji	12	(0)
2014	Tacuarembó	8	(0)
2015	Liverpool Montevideo	3	(0)
2016–2017	Villa Española	50	(4)
2018	Zulia	31	(3)
2019–	Villa Teresa	3	(0)
- * Club domestic league appearances and goals as of 20:22, 6 June 2019 (UTC)

Cristian Martín Rodríguez Telis (Latin American Spanish: [maɾˈtin roˈðɾiɣes]; born 10 February 1985 in Artigas, Uruguay), is an Uruguayan footballer who plays as a defender for Villa Teresa.
