= Pablo Melo =

Uruguayan footballer (born 1982)

Personal information
- Full name: Pablo Rodrigo Melo
- Date of birth: 7 April 1982 (age 44)
- Place of birth: Rivera, Uruguay
- Height: 1.80 m (5 ft 11 in)
- Position: Defender

Youth career
- Cerro

Senior career*
Years	Team	Apps	(Gls)
2000–2004	Cerro	149	(9)
2005	Danubio	25	(1)
2006–2007	Tiro Federal	26	(0)
2007	Cerro	14	(0)
2008	Nacional	24	(0)
2009–2010	Cerro	36	(2)
2010	→ San Martín SJ (loan)	10	(0)
2010	Deportes La Serena	0	(0)
2011	Manta	11	(1)
2011	América de Cali	11	(0)
2012	Liverpool Montevideo	23	(2)
2013	Aragua	10	(0)
2013–2014	Cerro	39	(3)
2015	Cerrito	14	(1)

International career
2003–2004	Uruguay	3	(0)
- * Club domestic league appearances and goals

Pablo Rodrigo Melo (born July 4, 1982, in Rivera) is a Uruguayan former footballer who played as a defender.

== Teams ==
- (Uruguay) Cerro 2000–2004
- (Uruguay) Danubio 2005
- (Argentina) Tiro Federal 2006–2007
- (Uruguay) Cerro 2007
- (Uruguay) Nacional 2008
- (Uruguay) Cerro 2009–2010
- (Argentina) San Martín de San Juan 2010
- (Chile) Deportes La Serena 2010
- (Ecuador) Manta 2011
- (Colombia) América de Cali 2011
- (Uruguay) Liverpool 2012
- (Venezuela) Aragua 2013
- (Uruguay) Cerro 2013–2014
- (Uruguay) Cerrito 2015
