= Mauricio Rosa =

Uruguayan footballer (born 1986)

Personal information
- Full name: Mauricio Juan Rosa Noni
- Date of birth: 4 April 1986 (age 40)
- Place of birth: Paso de los Toros, Uruguay
- Height: 1.78 m (5 ft 10 in)
- Position: Full-back

Senior career*
Years	Team	Apps	(Gls)
2006–2007	River Plate Montevideo	1	(0)
2008–2009	Rampla Juniors	25	(1)
2010	Rentistas	7	(0)
2011–2012	Deportes Antofagasta	22	(0)
2012	Unión Temuco	8	(0)
2013	Central Español	11	(0)
- * Club domestic league appearances and goals

Mauricio Juan Rosa Noni (born April 4, 1986, in Paso de los Toros) is a Uruguayan former footballer who played as a full-back.

== Teams ==
- (Uruguay) River Plate de Montevideo 2006–2007
- (Uruguay) Rampla Juniors 2008–2009
- (Uruguay) Rentistas 2010
- (Chile) Deportes Antofagasta 2011–2012
- (Chile) Unión Temuco 2012
- (Uruguay) Central Español 2013

== Titles ==
- (Chile) Deportes Antofagasta 2011 (Torneo Apertura Primera B Championship)
