= Gastón Filgueira =

Uruguayan footballer (born 1986)

Personal information
- Full name: Gastón Filgueira Méndez
- Date of birth: 8 January 1986 (age 40)
- Place of birth: Montevideo, Uruguay
- Height: 1.73 m (5 ft 8 in)
- Position: Left back

Team information
- Current team: Cerro
- Number: 33

Senior career*
| Years | Team | Apps | (Gls) |
| 2005–2006 | Central Español | 28 | (0) |
| 2007 | Arsenal de Sarandí | 6 | (0) |
| 2008–2010 | Nacional | 26 | (1) |
| 2010–2011 | Cerro | 37 | (1) |
| 2012–2013 | Palestino | 22 | (1) |
| 2013–2014 | Liverpool de Montevideo | 22 | (1) |
| 2014–2016 | Náutico | 91 | (1) |
| 2017 | Fortaleza | 7 | (1) |
| 2017–2019 | Villa Nova | 91 | (1) |
| 2020–2021 | Cerro | 12 | (0) |

International career
| 2006 | Uruguay | 10 | (2) |
- * Club domestic league appearances and goals

Gastón Filgueira Méndez (born 8 January 1986) is a Uruguayan former football player.

== International career ==
Filgueira made his Uruguay debut against Venezuela in 2006. He was recalled to the team for a match against Australia, on 2 June 2007.

== Titles ==
=== Nacional ===
- Primera División Uruguaya: 2008–09

=== Arsenal ===
- 2007 Copa Sudamericana

=== Fortaleza ===
- 2017 Copa de campeones cearense
