= Federico Domínguez (footballer, born 1976) =

Argentine footballer

Personal information
- Full name: Federico Hernán Domínguez
- Date of birth: 13 August 1976 (age 50)
- Place of birth: Lanús, Argentina
- Height: 1.80 m (5 ft 11 in)
- Position: Left back

Senior career*
Years	Team	Apps	(Gls)
1993–2002	Vélez Sársfield	153	(24)
1998	→ Espanyol (loan)	5	(0)
2002–2003	Independiente	27	(4)
2003–2004	Leganés	17	(3)
2004	Santos Laguna	26	(3)
2004–2007	River Plate	43	(7)
2007–2008	Gimnasia LP	27	(6)
2008–2009	Apollon Limassol	3	(0)
2009	Nacional	7	(3)
2009–2011	Argentinos Juniors	32	(0)
2011	Olimpo	17	(1)
2011–2012	Montevideo Wanderers	12	(1)

International career
1993	Argentina U17	3	(1)
1994–1996	Argentina U23		
1995	Argentina U20	3	(0)
2003	Argentina	1	(0)
- * Club domestic league appearances and goals as of 23:35, 29 July 2012 (UTC)

Federico Hernán Domínguez (born 13 August 1976 in Buenos Aires, Argentina) is an Argentine former footballer who last played for the Uruguayan side Montevideo Wanderers.

== Career ==
Domínguez began his professional career with Vélez Sarsfield, where he won the Copa Libertadores in 1994. He played the 1998/1999 season with Spanish Espanyol, but returned to Vélez to play until 2002. That year he moved to Independiente.

By winning the 2002 Apertura, the single title of this clube since 1994 in Argentine First Division, he was capped by Argentina national team in July 2003. It would by his only call for Argentina main team, after having got 29 matches and four goals by different youth Albiceleste teams: for the U17, he was called to 1993 FIFA World Championship; for the U23, he was part of 1994 Copa de las Américas Sub-23 as well of 1996 CONMEBOL Pre-Olympic Tournament; and with the U20 he won the 1995 FIFA World Youth Championship.

Domínguez joined Mexican Santos Laguna after playing the first half of the 2003/2004 season with Spanish Second Division Leganés. Joining Santos for the 2004 Clausura, Domínguez immediately became an important player, starting 15 of 19 games for the club and scoring one goal. He repeated his performance in the Apertura of that year, appearing in 13 games and scoring twice.

Between 2004 and 2007 Domínguez played for River Plate and he played for Gimnasia y Esgrima de La Plata between 2007 and 2008.

In 2008, he joined Cypriot side Apollon Limassol, where he played 3 matches before leaving citing personal reasons. He returned to South America to join Nacional of Uruguay.

In 2009, he was signed by new Argentinos Juniors manager Claudio Borghi and became an important member of the Argentinos Juniors team that won the Clausura 2010 championship. He played in 15 of the club's 19 games during their championship winning campaign and was one of the few players in the team to have any previous championship winning experience.

== National team statistics ==
Argentina national team
Year	Apps	Goals
2003	1	0
Total	1	0

== Titles ==
Argentina U-20

- FIFA World Youth Championship (1): 1995

Vélez Sársfield

- Argentine Primera División (3): Apertura 1995, Clausura 1996, Clausura 1998
- Copa Libertadores (1): 1994
- Supercopa Libertadores (1): 1996

Independiente

- Argentine Primera División (1): Apertura 2002

Argentinos Juniors

- Argentine Primera División (1): Clausura 2010
