= Miguel Amado =

Uruguayan footballer (born 1984)

Personal information
- Full name: Miguel Angel Amado Alanis
- Date of birth: 28 December 1984 (age 41)
- Place of birth: Rivera, Uruguay
- Height: 1.72 m (5 ft 8 in)
- Position: Defensive midfielder

Youth career
- Defensor Sporting

Senior career*
Years	Team	Apps	(Gls)
2002–2011	Defensor Sporting		
2011–2016	Olimpia	110	(2)
2013	→ Peñarol (loan)	8	(0)
2016	Defensor Sporting	14	(0)
2016–2017	Guaraní	7	(0)
2017–2018	Central Español	25	(1)
2018–2019	Boston River	26	(1)

International career
2009	Uruguay	2	(0)
- * Club domestic league appearances and goals

Miguel Angel Amado Alanis (born 28 December 1984) is a Uruguayan former footballer who played as a midfielder.

== International career ==
Miguel Amado made his international debut for Uruguay on 10 June 2009. He was in the starting line-up for a World Cup qualifying match against Venezuela, which ended as a 2–2 draw for both sides. He has won 2 caps for the Uruguay national football team.

== Honors ==
=== Club ===
Defensor Sporting

- Primera División (1): 2007–08
