= Andrés Fernández (footballer, born August 1986) =

Uruguayan footballer

Personal information
- Full name: Andrés Pablo Fernández Rizzo
- Date of birth: 21 August 1986 (age 40)
- Place of birth: Montevideo, Uruguay
- Height: 1.84 m (6 ft 0 in)
- Position: Defender

Senior career*
Years	Team	Apps	(Gls)
2006–2012	Central Español	59	(3)
2011–2012	→ Danubio (loan)	30	(1)
2012–2013	Danubio	9	(0)
2013–2014	Central Español	19	(1)
2014	Hebei Zhongji	27	(3)
2015	Municipal	17	(0)
2015–2016	El Tanque Sisley	11	(0)
2016–2017	Torque	11	(1)
2017	Central Español	13	(1)
- * Club domestic league appearances and goals as of 23:43, 23 December 2019 (UTC)

Andrés Pablo Fernández Rizzo (Latin American Spanish: [anˌdɾes ˈpaβlo feɾˈnandes]; born 21 August 1986) is an Argentine-born citizen of Uruguayan descent football defender.

== Club career ==
Fernández started his football career at Central Español in 2006.

He was transferred to China League One side Hebei Zhongji on 27 January 2014.

On 13 January 2015, he was transferred to Municipal.
