= Baltasar Silva =

Uruguayan footballer (born 1984)

Personal information
- Full name: Héctor Baltasar Silva Cabrera
- Date of birth: 19 November 1984 (age 41)
- Place of birth: Tacuarembó, Uruguay
- Height: 1.72 m (5 ft 8 in)
- Position: Defender

Senior career*
Years	Team	Apps	(Gls)
2010	Tacuarembó	13	(0)
2010–2013	River Plate	54	(0)
2013–2015	Peñarol	26	(1)
2015–2016	Cerro	18	(0)
2016	Juventud Unida	5	(0)
2016–2017	Plaza Colonia	37	(0)
2017–2020	Tacuarembó	51	(2)
- * Club domestic league appearances and goals

Baltasar Silva (born 19 November 1984) is a Uruguayan former footballer.
