= Jorge García (footballer, born 1986) =

Uruguayan footballer

Jorge Adrián García
Personal information
- Full name: Jorge Adrián García Echeverría
- Date of birth: 19 August 1986 (age 40)
- Place of birth: Montevideo, Uruguay
- Height: 1.81 m (5 ft 11 in)
- Position: Midfielder

Senior career*
| Years | Team | Apps | (Gls) |
| 2004–2010 | Danubio | 99 | (10) |
| 2011 | Cerrito | 8 | (0) |
| 2012 | Democrata | | |
| 2012–2013 | Cerro | 16 | (3) |

International career
| 2006 | Uruguay | 1 | (0) |
- * Club domestic league appearances and goals

Jorge Adrián García Echeverría (born 19 August 1986) is a Uruguayan former professional footballer who played as a midfielder.

== Personal life ==
García killed his father in 2014.

== Honours ==
Danubio

- Uruguayan Primera División: 2004, 2006–07
