= Andrés Rodales =

Uruguayan footballer (born 1986)

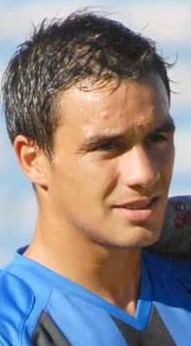

Personal information
- Full name: Carlos Andrés Rodales Ramírez
- Date of birth: 27 June 1986 (age 40)
- Place of birth: Durazno, Uruguay
- Height: 1.77 m (5 ft 10 in)
- Position: Right back

Team information
- Current team: Durazno

Senior career*
Years	Team	Apps	(Gls)
2006–2010	Liverpool de Montevideo	120	(8)
2011	Tigre	25	(0)
2012–2014	Liverpool de Montevideo	42	(2)
2013–2014	→ Atlético de Rafaela (loan)	36	(4)
2014–2017	Peñarol	26	(0)
2015	→ Liverpool de Montevideo (loan)	14	(0)
2017	Liverpool de Montevideo	21	(0)
2017	Deportivo Maldonado	13	(0)
2018	Atenas	31	(0)
2019–2021	Rentistas	79	(1)
2022	Atenas	21	(0)
2023	Rentistas	27	(0)
2024–	Durazno		
- * Club domestic league appearances and goals as of 19 January 2024

Carlos Andrés Rodales Ramírez (born 27 June 1986) is a Uruguayan footballer who plays for Durazno.
