= Roberto Brum (footballer, born 1983) =

Uruguayan footballer

Personal information
- Full name: Roberto Sebastián Brum Gutiérrez
- Date of birth: 5 July 1983 (age 43)
- Place of birth: Montevideo, Uruguay
- Height: 1.74 m (5 ft 9 in)
- Position: Defensive midfielder

Team information
- Current team: IA Río Negro
- Number: 5

Senior career*
Years	Team	Apps	(Gls)
2002–2003	Talleres		
2004–2007	Cerro	95	(2)
2008–2009	Nacional	36	(3)
2009–2011	Olimpo	58	(1)
2011	→ Argentinos Juniors (loan)	13	(1)
2012–2013	Banfield	33	(2)
2013–2015	Patronato	52	(3)
2015–2016	Gimnasia y Esgrima	36	(1)
2016–2018	Aldosivi	44	(1)
2018–2020	Temperley	29	(1)
2020	Atenas	12	(0)
2021–2023	Cerro	52	(0)
2024–	IA Río Negro		
- * Club domestic league appearances and goals as of 7 December 2023

Roberto Sebastián Brum Gutiérrez (born 5 July 1983) is a Uruguayan footballer who plays for IA Río Negro.

== Career ==
=== Club ===
Brum's career started in Argentina with Talleres, before he moved to Uruguay to join Cerro. After 2 goals in 95 appearances over three years with the club, Brum departed to sign for Nacional. He played in 36 of the club's 2008–09 Uruguayan Primera División fixtures before leaving after a single season to return to Argentina to join Primera B Nacional's Olimpo. During his time with Olimpo, he won promotion to the Argentine Primera División after the club won the 2009–10 Primera B Nacional. Between 2011 and 2013, Brum played for Argentinos Juniors on loan and Banfield permanently. In the 2011–12 season, Brum played 13 times for Argentinos Juniors and 11 for Banfield. 22 appearances followed for Brum with Banfield in 2012–13.

August 2013 saw Brum depart Banfield as he agreed to sign for fellow Primera B Nacional side Patronato, in his debut season for Patronato he scored 3 goals in 36 appearances and picked up 15 yellow cards without getting sent off. 16 more league appearances came for Brum in 2014. In January 2015, Brum joined Argentine Primera División side Gimnasia y Esgrima. His debut came on 22 February against San Martín and he scored his first Gimnasia goal in November against the same opposition. On 7 July 2016, Brum completed a transfer to another Primera División team, Aldosivi.

== Career statistics ==
=== Club ===
As of 30 October 2016.

Club statistics
Club	Season	League			Cup (Note: Includes the Copa Argentina)		League Cup		Continental (Note: Includes the Copa Libertadores and Copa Sudamericana)		Other		Total	
Club	Season	Division	Apps	Goals	Apps	Goals	Apps	Goals	Apps	Goals	Apps	Goals	Apps	Goals
Aldosivi	2016–17	Primera División	7	0	0	0	—		—		0	0	7	0
Aldosivi	Total		7	0	0	0	—		—		0	0	7	0
Career total			7	0	0	0	—		—		0	0	7	0

== Honours ==
=== Club ===
Nacional

- Uruguayan Primera División (1): 2008–09

Olimpo

- Primera B Nacional (1): 2009–10
