= Oscar Castro (footballer) =

Uruguayan footballer (born 1993)

Personal information
- Full name: Oscar Padula Castro Rodríguez
- Date of birth: 28 November 1993 (age 32)
- Place of birth: Tacuarembó, Uruguay
- Height: 1.91 m (6 ft 3 in)
- Position: Centre back

Team information
- Current team: Rocha
- Number: 22

Youth career
- Tacuarembó

Senior career*
Years	Team	Apps	(Gls)
2013–2015	Tacuarembó	27	(1)
2016–2017	Bolívar	0	(0)
2017–2018	Cerro Largo	30	(2)
2018–2019	Acassuso	14	(0)
2019–2020	Tacuarembó	4	(0)
2020–2021	Rampla Juniors	9	(0)
2021	La Luz		
2022–	Rocha		
- * Club domestic league appearances and goals as of 29 January 2021

Oscar Padula Castro Rodríguez (born 28 November 1993) is a Uruguayan professional footballer who plays as a defender for Rocha.

== Early life and career ==
Padula Castro's career began in his hometown with the local football club Tacuarembó. His professional debut came on 13 October 2013 during a Segunda División defeat to Rocha, as he went on to make eleven more appearances in 2013–14 as they won the title to gain promotion to the Primera División. In October 2013 he suffered a nasal bridge fissure and was not in a game with Tacuarembo. He scored his first senior goal in a draw with Rampla Juniors on 23 November 2014. They were relegated back down to tier two in 2014–15, with Padula Castro eventually leaving midway through 2015–16 to join Bolívar in January 2016.

In January 2016, he arrived in La Paz to play the Copa Libertadores de América, meaning Bolivar's team had eight foreign players including him. The hiring was seen as a surprise, with Oscar Padula as the last reinforcement hired by the team for the game. e remained for twelve months but didn't feature in league football, though did appear in the Copa Libertadores versus Racing Club.

In February 2017, Padula Castro completed a move back to Uruguay after agreeing a deal with Cerro Largo; having terminated his Bolívar contract. Two goals, versus Oriental and Rentistas, in thirty-two appearances followed across two seasons in the Segunda División. He was playing with Cerro Largo Fútbol Club in late 2017. On 22 July 2018, Padula Castro joined Acassuso of Argentina's Primera B Metropolitana. His first appearance came in a victory over Colegiales on 21 August. In 2020, he continued to be active with the team, said El País.

== Career statistics ==
As of 3 April 2019.

Appearances and goals by club, season and competition
Club	Season	League			Cup		Continental		Other		Total	
Club	Season	Division	Apps	Goals	Apps	Goals	Apps	Goals	Apps	Goals	Apps	Goals
Tacuarembó	2013–14	Segunda División	12	0	0	0	—		0	0	12	0
Tacuarembó	2014–15	Uruguayan Primera División	15	1	0	0	—		0	0	15	1
Tacuarembó	2015–16	Segunda División	0	0	0	0	—		0	0	0	0
Tacuarembó	Total		27	1	0	0	—		0	0	27	1
Bolívar	2015–16	Bolivian Primera División	0	0	0	0	1 (Note: Appearance(s) in the Copa Libertadores)	0	0	0	1	0
Bolívar	2016–17	Bolivian Primera División	0	0	0	0	0	0	0	0	0	0
Bolívar	Total		0	0	0	0	1	0	0	0	1	0
Cerro Largo	2017	Segunda División	23	2	0	0	—		2 (Note: Appearance(s) in the Segunda División play-offs)	0	25	2
Cerro Largo	2018	Segunda División	7	0	0	0	—		0	0	7	0
Cerro Largo	Total		30	2	0	0	—		2	0	32	2
Acassuso	2018–19	Primera B Metropolitana	11	0	0	0	—		0	0	11	0
Career total			68	3	0	0	1	0	2	0	71	3

== Honours ==
Tacuarembó

- Segunda División: 2013–14
