= 2005–06 Campeonato Uruguayo Primera División =

Uruguayan professional football season

The 2005–06 season in the Uruguayan Primera División saw Nacional defend and win a back-to-back-title by defeating the surprise of the championship, Rocha F.C., on two consecutive finals, thus winning their 41st title in Uruguayan football. Two teams were relegated, Deportivo Colonia and Cerro, but this time only one team, Progreso, was promoted.

== Overview ==
It was contested by 20 teams, and Nacional won the championship.

== Apertura ==
Pos	Team	Pld	W	D	L	GF	GA	GD	Pts
1	Rocha	17	10	3	4	37	25	+12	33
2	Nacional	17	9	7	1	32	16	+16	31 (Note: 3 points deducted?)
3	Danubio	17	8	3	6	36	25	+11	27
4	Rampla Juniors	17	8	2	7	35	25	+10	26
5	Deportivo Colonia	17	6	8	3	23	19	+4	26
6	Cerrito	17	6	7	4	20	18	+2	25
7	Peñarol	17	6	7	4	22	26	−4	25
8	River Plate	17	6	6	5	24	22	+2	24
9	Rentistas	17	7	3	7	21	22	−1	24
10	Liverpool	17	5	7	5	19	18	+1	22
11	Defensor Sporting	17	5	7	5	21	21	0	22
12	Cerro	17	5	7	5	23	25	−2	22
13	Plaza Colonia	17	5	6	6	15	23	−8	21
14	Montevideo Wanderers	17	4	8	5	27	32	−5	20
15	Miramar Misiones	17	3	9	5	18	18	0	18
16	Tacuarembó	17	4	5	8	13	21	−8	17
17	Fénix	17	3	4	10	22	31	−9	13
18	Paysandú	17	1	5	11	18	39	−21	8

Source: RSSSF

== Relegation table (2005 and Apertura) ==
Pos	Team	Pld	W	D	L	GF	GA	GD	Pts	Qualification or relegation
1	Nacional	34	21	12	1	71	32	+39	72 (Note: 3 points deducted?)	
2	Defensor Sporting	34	17	12	5	54	34	+20	63	
3	Peñarol	34	16	12	6	50	45	+5	60	
4	Rocha	34	16	10	8	64	46	+18	58	
5	Danubio	34	16	7	11	59	41	+18	55	
6	Rentistas	34	13	9	12	51	47	+4	48	
7	Liverpool	34	12	11	11	45	43	+2	47	
8	River Plate	34	12	10	12	58	54	+4	46	
9	Cerrito	34	11	13	10	41	37	+4	46	
10	Montevideo Wanderers	34	10	13	11	57	65	−8	43	
11	Miramar Misiones	34	10	11	13	51	47	+4	41	
12	Rampla Juniors	34	11	7	16	54	56	−2	40	
13	Deportivo Colonia	34	9	12	13	38	50	−12	39	
14	Tacuarembó	34	9	11	14	30	39	−9	38	
15	Cerro	34	8	11	15	43	55	−12	35	Relegation play-offs
16	Plaza Colonia	34	8	11	15	23	50	−27	35	Relegation play-offs
17	Fénix	34	8	8	18	41	57	−16	32	Relegation
18	Paysandú	34	4	10	20	41	73	−32	22	Relegation

Source: RSSSF

== Clausura ==
Pos	Team	Pld	W	D	L	GF	GA	GD	Pts
1	Nacional	16	12	2	2	31	12	+19	38
2	Defensor Sporting	16	10	5	1	34	15	+19	35
3	Danubio	16	9	3	4	31	24	+7	30
4	Central Español	16	8	3	5	19	16	+3	27
5	Liverpool	16	7	4	5	27	27	0	25
6	Rentistas	16	7	3	6	28	22	+6	24
7	Cerrito	16	5	8	3	17	16	+1	23
8	Rampla Juniors	16	6	5	5	24	29	−5	23
9	River Plate	16	6	2	8	19	20	−1	20
10	Bella Vista	16	5	4	7	18	19	−1	19
11	Tacuarembó	16	4	6	6	12	19	−7	18
12	Montevideo Wanderers	16	4	4	8	18	19	−1	16
13	Cerro	16	6	3	7	23	16	+7	15 (Note: Cerro had 6 points deducted following the murder incident with Peñarol)
14	Miramar Misiones	16	3	5	8	17	30	−13	14
15	Rocha	16	3	3	10	18	29	−11	12
16	Deportivo Colonia	16	3	2	11	12	30	−18	11
17	Peñarol	16	5	4	7	20	25	−5	7 (Note: Peñarol had 12 deducted following various incidents including the murder of a Cerro fan by Peñarol hooligans on Mar 11)

Source: RSSSF

== Championship play-off ==
Semi-finals				Finals
				Aggregate table first place	Nacional	—	—
Apertura winners	Rocha	1	0		Nacional	—	—
Clausura winners	Nacional	4	2

=== Semi-finals ===
First Leg
2006-06-22

Rocha	1 – 4	Nacional
Caro 54'		Vázquez 22', 45'; Suárez 51'; Garcés 88'

Estadio Doctor Sobrero, Rocha
Referee: Prudente (URU)
Second Leg
2006-06-25

Nacional	2 – 0	Rocha
Suárez 62'; Vázquez 77'

Estadio Parque Central, Montevideo
Referee: Silvera (URU)

=== Finals ===
Nacional winners of semifinal; the team should play the final against the best team of the aggregate table 2005–06; as that is also Nacional, they are champions of Uruguay 2005–06.

Primera División
2005–06 champion

41st title

== Relegation table (2005 and 2005–06) ==
Pos	Club	P	Pts	Average
13	Bella Vista	16	19	1.188
14	Tacuarembó	50	56	1.120
15	Miramar Misiones	55	50	1.110
16	Cerro	50	50	1.000
17	Deportivo Colonia	50	50	1.000

== Topscorers ==
Pos	Name	Team	Goals
1	José Pedro Cardozo	Rocha	17
2	Ignacio González	Danubio	13
3	Junior Aliberti	Wanderers / Plaza Colonia	12
	Gonzalo Castro	Nacional	12
	Marcos Antonio García	Rampla Juniors	12
	Juan Manuel Olivera	Danubio	12
	Maxi Pereira	Defensor	12
8	Gabriel Cedrés	River Plate / C.A. Peñarol	11
	Richard Porta	River Plate	11
	Elías Ferreira	C.A. Peñarol / Rentistas	11
11	Mauro Aldave	Rocha	10
	Nicolás Olivera	Defensor	10
