= 2005 Campeonato Uruguayo Primera División =

Uruguayan professional football season

The Primera División Uruguaya 2005 started on 5 March 2005 and ended on 12 July 2005.

The league was a single round-robin tournament and not relegation and promotion from Segunda División Uruguay. But along with Apertura 2005 of 2005–06 season, the whole schedule of 2005 would count in a final table, and the bottom three would be directly relegated. The winners qualified for the 2006 Copa Libertadores.

== Standings ==
Pos	Team	Pld	W	D	L	GF	GA	GD	Pts	Qualification
1	Nacional	17	12	5	0	39	16	+23	41	Championship tiebreaker
2	Defensor	17	12	5	0	33	13	+20	41	Championship tiebreaker
3	Peñarol	17	10	5	2	28	19	+9	35	
4	Danubio	17	8	4	5	23	16	+7	28	
5	Rocha	17	6	7	4	27	21	+6	25	
6	Liverpool	17	7	4	6	26	25	+1	25	
7	Rentistas	17	6	6	5	30	25	+5	24	
8	Miramar Misiones	17	7	2	8	33	29	+4	23	
9	Wanderers	17	6	5	6	30	33	−3	23	
10	River Plate	17	6	4	7	34	32	+2	22	
11	Cerrito	17	5	6	6	21	19	+2	21	
12	Tacuarembó	17	5	6	6	17	18	−1	21	
13	Fénix	17	5	4	8	19	26	−7	19	
14	Paysandú	17	3	5	9	23	34	−11	14	
15	Rampla Juniors	17	3	5	9	19	31	−12	14	
16	Plaza Colonia	17	3	5	9	8	27	−19	14	
17	Cerro	17	3	4	10	20	30	−10	13	
18	Deportivo Colonia	17	3	4	10	15	31	−16	13	

Source: RSSSF

=== Championship tiebreaker ===
Defensor Sporting refused to play the tiebreaker match due to Nacional winning their last match by a contested penalty in 7th minute of injury time. Nacional was awarded the championship on 6 July 2005.

Primera División
2005 champion
Nacional
40th title

== Topscorers ==
Pos	Name	Team	Goals
1	Pablo Granoche	Miramar Misiones	16
2	Elías Ferreira	Rentistas	14
3	Sergio Blanco	Wanderers	12
4	Osvaldo Canobbio	River Plate	11
5	Martín Ligüera	Nacional	10
6	Sebastián Taborda	Defensor	9
7	José Pedro Cardozo	Rocha	8
	Richard Porta	River Plate	8
	Ignacio Risso	Danubio	8
	Sebastián Abreu	Nacional	8
	Hugo Costela	Defensor	8
	Leonardo Medina	Liverpool	8
