= 2010–11 Club Nacional de Football season =

Nacional
2010-11 season
- Chairman: Ricardo Alarcón
- Manager: Luis González (until October 11, 2010); Juan Ramón Carrasco
- Primera Division: Apertura: 2nd Clausura: 1st Overall: Champion
- Copa Libertadores: Second Stage
- Top goalscorer: League: Santiago García (23 goals); All: Santiago García (26 goals)
- Highest home attendance: 61,000 v Fluminense (7 April 2011)
- Lowest home attendance: 16,000 v Rampla Juniors (4 June 2011)
- Average home league attendance: 28,087
Home colours	Away colours	Third colours

Club Nacional de Football's 2010–11 season was the club's 111th year of existence and the club's 107th in the top-flight.

== Club ==
Personnel

Chairman: Ricardo Alarcón
Sports Manager: Daniel Henríquez

Coaching staff

Manager: Juan Ramón Carrasco
Assistant manager: Darwin Rodríguez
Goalkeeper coach: Omar Garate
Fitness coach: Mauricio Marchetti
Doctor: Carlos Suero
First team collaborate: Ruben Sosa

Kits

Provider: Umbro
Sponsors: Antel, Macri Sport Center

Home
Away
Third kit

== Squad ==
As of June 3, 2011

No.	Name	Nationality	Position	Date of birth (age)	Signed from	Notes
1	Leonardo Burián	(Uruguay)	GK	January 21, 1984 (age 42)	(Uruguay) Bella Vista	
2	Alejandro Lembo	(Uruguay)	DF	February 15, 1978 (age 48)	(Greece) Aris Thessaloniki	Captain
3	Jadson Viera	(Brazil)	DF	August 4, 1981 (age 45)	(Brazil) Vasco da Gama	In on 4 February 2011.
4	Christian Núñez	(Uruguay)	DF	September 24, 1982 (age 44)	(Uruguay) Cerro	
5	Anderson Silva	(Brazil)	MF	August 28, 1982 (age 44)	(England) Barnsley	In on 29 December 2010
6	Nicolás Vigneri	(Uruguay)	FW	July 6, 1983 (age 43)	(Uruguay) Fénix	In on 5 February 2011
7	Jonathan Charquero	(Uruguay)	FW	February 21, 1989 (age 37)	(Uruguay) Montevideo Wanderers	In on 18 December 2010
8	Matías Cabrera	(Uruguay)	MF	May 16, 1986 (age 40)	(Uruguay) Cerro	
9	Bruno Fornaroli	(Uruguay)	FW	August 7, 1987 (age 39)	(Spain) Recreativo de Huelva	In on 26 January 2011.
10	Marcelo Gallardo	(Argentina)	MF	January 18, 1976 (age 50)	(Argentina) Rive Plate	
11	Horacio Peralta	(Uruguay)	MF	June 3, 1982 (age 44)	(Uruguay) Central Español	
12	Martín Tejera	(Uruguay)	GK	February 16, 1991 (age 35)	The Academy	Reserve team player
13	Gabriel Marques	(Brazil)	DF	March 31, 1983 (age 43)	(Uruguay) River Plate	In on 17 January 2011.
14	Robert Flores	(Uruguay)	MF	November 25, 1988 (age 37)	(Spain) Villarreal B	
15	Tabaré Viudez	(Uruguay)	FW	September 8, 1989 (age 37)	(Mexico) Necaxa	In on 1 December 2010
16	Carlão	(Brazil)	DF	July 19, 1987 (age 39)	(Brazil) Duque de Caxias	In on January 6, 2011
17	Maximiliano Calzada	(Uruguay)	MF	April 21, 1990 (age 36)	The Academy	Out of the team by contractual problems on 20 September 2010. He rejoined the team on 9 November 2010.
18	Gonzalo Godoy	(Uruguay)	DF	January 17, 1988 (age 38)	(Uruguay) Cerro	
19	Sebastián Coates	(Uruguay)	DF	October 7, 1990 (age 36)	The Academy	Vice-captain
20	Santiago García	(Uruguay)	FW	September 14, 1990 (aged 30)	The Academy	
21	Flavio Córdoba	(Colombia)	DF	October 4, 1984 (age 42)	(Uruguay) River Plate	In on 25 January 2011.
22	Mauricio Pereyra	(Uruguay)	MF	March 15, 1990 (age 36)	The Academy	Out of the team by contractual problems on 20 September 2010. He rejoined the team on 9 November 2010.
23	Facundo Píriz	(Uruguay)	MF	March 27, 1990 (age 36)	The Academy	
24	Richard Porta	(Australia)	FW	January 8, 1985 (age 41)	(Uruguay) River Plate	
25	Rodrigo Muñoz	(Uruguay)	GK	January 22, 1982 (age 44)	(Uruguay) Cerro	First team Goalkeeper
–	Ernesto Goñi	(Uruguay)	DF	January 13, 1985 (age 41)	(Uruguay) Racing	Contract terminated on 16 December 2010.
–	Mariano Pernía	(Spain)	DF	May 4, 1977 (age 49)	(Spain) Atlético Madrid	Contract terminated on 9 December 2010.
–	Julián Perujo	(Uruguay)	DF	April 18, 1985 (age 41)	(Uruguay) Rampla Juniors	
–	Diego Rodríguez	(Uruguay)	DF	May 28, 1988 (aged 22)	(Uruguay) Central Español	Died on September 11, 2010, from injuries following a car accident.
–	Alexis Rolín	(Uruguay)	DF	March 2, 1989 (age 37)	The Academy	Reserve team player
–	Raúl Ferro	(Uruguay)	MF	January 13, 1983 (age 43)	(Uruguay) Danubio	Out on 29 November 2010.
–	Mathías Mirabaje	(Uruguay)	MF	March 6, 1989 (age 37)	(Uruguay) Racing	Contract terminated on 5 January 2011.
–	Marcelo Palau	(Uruguay)	MF	August 1, 1985 (age 41)	(Mexico) Puebla	Contract terminated on 5 November 2010.
–	Santiago Romero	(Uruguay)	MF	February 15, 1990 (age 36)	The Academy	Reserve team player
–	Gino Aguirre	(Uruguay)	FW	March 23, 1993 (age 33)	The Academy	Reserve team player
–	Martín Cauteruccio	(Uruguay)	FW	April 14, 1987 (age 39)	(Uruguay) Racing	Out on 26 December 2010
–	Diego Cháves	(Uruguay)	FW	February 14, 1986 (age 40)	(Mexico) Veracruz	Contract terminated on 16 December 2010.
–	Sergio Cortalezzi	(Uruguay)	FW	September 9, 1994 (age 32)	The Academy	Reserve team player
–	Gonzalo Bueno	(Uruguay)	FW	September 1, 1991 (age 35)	The Academy	Reserve team player
–	Renato César	(Uruguay)	FW	August 16, 1993 (age 33)	The Academy	Reserve team player
–	Carlos De Pena	(Uruguay)	FW	March 11, 1992 (age 34)	The Academy	Reserve team player
–	Nicolás López	(Uruguay)	FW	September 9, 1993 (age 33)	The Academy	Reserve team player
–	Rodrigo Roque	(Uruguay)	FW	May 3, 1991 (age 35)	The Academy	Reserve team player

=== Winter transfers ===
Players In
Name	Nat	Pos	Moving from
Mariano Pernía	ESP	FW	(Spain) Atlético Madrid
Martín Cauteruccio	URU	FW	(Uruguay) Racing
Diego Cháves	URU	FW	(Mexico) Veracruz
Marcelo Gallardo	URU	MF	(Argentina) River Plate
Horacio Peralta	URU	MF	(Uruguay) Central Español
Mathías Mirabaje	URU	MF	(Uruguay) Racing
Robert Flores	URU	MF	(Spain) Villarreal B
Julián Perujo	URU	DF	(Uruguay) Rampla Juniors
Marcelo Palau	URU	MF	(Mexico) Puebla
Diego Rodríguez	URU	DF	(Uruguay) Central Español
Richard Porta	AUS	FW	(Uruguay) River Plate

Players Out
Name	Nat	Pos	Moving to
Martín Galain	URU	DF	(Uruguay) Tacuarembó
Gianni Guigou	URU	MF	End of contract
Eduardo Aranda	PAR	MF	(Uruguay) Defensor Sporting
Sebastián Balsas	URU	FW	(Argentina) San Lorenzo
Ángel Morales	ARG	MF	(Argentina) Huracán
Sergio Blanco	URU	FW	(Mexico) Querétaro
Nicola Pérez	URU	GK	(Uruguay) El Tanque Sisley
Mario Regueiro	URU	FW	(Argentina) Lanús
Álvaro González	URU	MF	(Italy) Lazio
Gustavo Varela	URU	MF	(Argentina) Quilmes
Oscar Javier Morales	URU	MF	(Argentina) Quilmes
Diego Vera	URU	FW	(Uruguay) Liverpool
Sebastián Fuentes	URU	GK	(Uruguay) El Tanque Sisley
Álvaro Apólito	URU	FW	End of contract
Bryan Machado	URU	FW	(Italy) Alessandria
Leonardo Novo	URU	FW	(Uruguay) El Tanque Sisley
Lucas Ruíz Díaz	URU	FW	(Uruguay) Plaza Colonia

=== Summer transfers ===
Players In
Name	Nat	Pos	Moving from
Anderson Silva	BRA	MF	(England) Barnsley
Nicolás Vigneri	URU	FW	(Uruguay) Fénix
Jonathan Charquero	URU	FW	(Uruguay) Montevideo Wanderers
Bruno Fornaroli	URU	FW	(Spain) Recreativo de Huelva
Tabaré Viudez	URU	FW	(Mexico) Necaxa
Gabriel Marques	BRA	DF	(Uruguay) River Plate
Flavio Córdoba	COL	DF	(Uruguay) River Plate
Carlão	BRA	DF	(Brazil) Duque de Caxias
Jadson Viera	BRA	DF	(Brazil) Vasco da Gama

Players Out
Name	Nat	Pos	Moving to
Ernesto Goñi	URU	DF	(Uruguay) Racing
Raúl Ferro	URU	MF	(Mexico) Querétaro
Mariano Pernía	ESP	DF	(Argentina) Tigre
Martín Cauteruccio	URU	FW	(Argentina) Quilmes
Diego Cháves	URU	FW	(United States) Chicago Fire
Mathías Mirabaje	URU	MF	(Colombia) Once Caldas
Marcelo Palau	URU	MF	(Mexico) Cruz Azul

== Competitions ==
=== Friendlies ===
29 June 2010	Argentinos Juniors (Argentina)	Cancelled	(Uruguay) Nacional	Buenos Aires, Argentina
10:00 (UTC-3)		Report		Stadium: Estadio Diego Armando Maradona

30 June 2010	Almirante Brown (Argentina)	Cancelled	(Uruguay) Nacional	Buenos Aires, Argentina
11:00 (UTC-3)		Report		Stadium: Estadio Fragata Presidente Sarmiento

3 August 2010	Nacional (Uruguay)	3–3	(Uruguay) El Tanque Sisley	Montevideo, Uruguay
09:30 (UTC-3)	García 33'; Cauteruccio 45+2'; Goñi 49'	Report	Callorda 17', 29'; Novo 41'	Stadium: Los Céspedes; Attendance: 0

5 August 2010	Nacional (Uruguay)	2–1	(Uruguay) River Plate	Montevideo, Uruguay
09:30 (UTC-3)	Cauteruccio 15', 37'	Report	Ezquerra 77'	Stadium: Estadio Gran Parque Central; Attendance: 100

7 August 2010	Nacional (Uruguay)	2–1	(Uruguay) Montevideo Wanderers	Montevideo, Uruguay
09:30 (UTC-3)	Cauteruccio 57', 79'	Report	Ramírez 28'	Stadium: Estadio Gran Parque Central; Attendance: 5,000

10 August 2010	Mutual de Montevideo (Uruguay)	0–4	(Uruguay) Nacional	Montevideo, Uruguay
16:00 (UTC-3)		Report	Ferro 38'; Cauteruccio 49', 83'; Coates 71'	Stadium: Fuerza Aérea, Carrasco; Attendance: 0

14 August 2010	Nacional (Uruguay)	1–0	(Uruguay) Cerrito	Montevideo, Uruguay
09:30 (UTC-3)	Cháves 74'	Report		Stadium: Estadio Gran Parque Central; Attendance: 500

16 August 2010	Nacional (Uruguay)	5–0	(Uruguay) Boston River	Montevideo, Uruguay
09:30 (UTC-3)	Pereyra 15'; Cauteruccio 38'; Coimbra 58' (o.g.); Cabrera 69'; Cháves 81'	Report		Stadium: Estadio Gran Parque Central; Attendance: 500

20 August 2010	Nacional (Uruguay)	2–1	(Uruguay) Cerrito	Montevideo, Uruguay
09:30 (UTC-3)	Cauteruccio 12', 29'	Report	Franco 71'	Stadium: Estadio Gran Parque Central; Attendance: 2,000

27 October 2010	Nacional (Uruguay)	5–1	(Uruguay) Bella Vista	Montevideo, Uruguay
16:00 (UTC-2)	Porta 27'; Cauteruccio 48', 57', 84'; Cháves 71'	Report	F. Rodríguez 63'	Stadium: Estadio Gran Parque Central; Attendance: 700

3 November 2010	Colonia (Uruguay)	0–5	(Uruguay) Nacional	Colonia, Uruguay
20:30 (UTC-2)		Report	Lembo 54'; Peralta 61'; Mirabaje 68'; Cauteruccio 71'; Coates 82'	Stadium: Estadio Profesor Alberto Suppici; Attendance: 12,000

18 November 2010	Nacional (Uruguay)	4–1	(Uruguay) Huracán	Montevideo, Uruguay
14:00 (UTC-2)	Flores 51'; Cauteruccio 58'; Goñi 71'; Porta 83'	Report	Rolín 67' (o.g.)	Stadium: Los Céspedes; Attendance: 0

23 November 2010	Nacional (Uruguay)	5–1	(Uruguay) Racing	Montevideo, Uruguay
17:00 (UTC-2)	Mirabaje 17'; Porta 25'; Flores 42'; Cauteruccio 67', 79'	Report	Larrosa 73'	Stadium: Estadio Gran Parque Central; Attendance: 100

7 December 2010	Estudiantes del Colla (Uruguay)	1–4	(Uruguay) Nacional	Colonia, Uruguay
20:00 (UTC-2)	Godoy 58' (o.g.)	Report	Porta 27', 76'; Cháves 41'; Perujo 81'	Stadium: Estadio Profesor Alberto Suppici; Attendance: 10,000

7 December 2010	Nacional de Nueva Helvecia (Uruguay)	1–0	(Uruguay) Nacional	Colonia, Uruguay
20:00 (UTC-2)	Berreto 3'	Report		Stadium: Estadio Profesor Alberto Suppici; Attendance: 10,000

9 December 2010	Florida (Uruguay)	0–4	(Uruguay) Nacional	Florida, Uruguay
20:00 (UTC-2)		Report	García 24', 58', 79'; Cauteruccio 39'	Stadium: Estadio Campeones Olímpicos; Attendance: 10,000

11 December 2010	Durazno (Uruguay)	0–2 (suspended)	(Uruguay) Nacional	Durazno, Uruguay
20:00 (UTC-2)		Report	Porta 7'; Perujo 12'	Stadium: Estadio Silvestre Landoni; Attendance: 10,000

19 January 2011	Nacional (Uruguay)	1–1	(Paraguay) Tacuary	Montevideo, Uruguay
20:00 (UTC-2)	Cauteruccio 90+2'	Report	Huth 52'	Stadium: Estadio Gran Parque Central; Attendance: 18,000; Referee: Fernando Cabrera (Uruguay)

28 January 2011	Nacional (Uruguay)	3–1	(Uruguay) Rampla Juniors	Montevideo, Uruguay
17:00 (UTC-2)	Porta 23'; S. García 41'; Peralta 51'	Report	R. García 52'	Stadium: Estadio Gran Parque Central; Attendance: 12,000; Referee: Fernando Cabrera (Uruguay)

8 February 2011	Nacional (Uruguay)	2–3	(Uruguay) Juventud	Montevideo, Uruguay
19:30 (UTC-2)	Viudez 17'; Porta 78'	Report	Dornell 32'; Di Fiori 49', 68'	Stadium: Estadio Gran Parque Central; Attendance: 0 Referee: Fernando Cabrera (Uruguay)

20 February 2011	Nacional (Uruguay)	7–0	(Uruguay) Mutual de Montevideo	Montevideo, Uruguay
16:00 (UTC-2)	Fornaroli 11'; Porta 23'; Viudez 49', 64'; García 73', 79'; Charquero 85'	Report		Stadium: Los Céspedes; Attendance: 0

20 February 2011	Nacional (Uruguay)	5–3	(Uruguay) Colón	Montevideo, Uruguay
16:00 (UTC-2)	Fornaroli 29'; Porta 34'; Flores 38'; Cabrera 44'; Charquero 78'	Report	Alvez 37', 52', 57'	Stadium: Los Céspedes; Attendance: 0

26 March 2011	Nacional (Uruguay)	3–2	(Uruguay) Fénix	Montevideo, Uruguay
10:00 (UTC-3)	Pereyra 19'; Charquero 43'; García 61'	Report	Novick 24', 79'	Stadium: Los Céspedes; Attendance: 0

27 April 2011	Durazno (Uruguay)	2–4	(Uruguay) Nacional	Durazno, Uruguay
21:30 (UTC-3)	Olivera 38'; Gasañol 69'	Report	Charquero 10'; De Pena 44'; Coates 51'; Pereyra 79'	Stadium: Estadio Silvestre Landoni; Attendance: 10,000

12 May 2011	Nacional (Uruguay)	0–2	(Uruguay) El Tanque Sisley	Montevideo, Uruguay
15:00 (UTC-3)		Report	Aliberti 36'; Coelho 67'	Stadium: Estadio Gran Parque Central; Attendance: 200; Referee: Walter Juncal (Uruguay)

25 May 2011	Nacional (Uruguay)	1–1	(Uruguay) Cerrito	Montevideo, Uruguay
15:00 (UTC-3)	López 79'	Report	Foletti 15'	Stadium: Los Céspedes; Attendance: 0

==== Porongos' 100 years celebration ====
23 June 2010	Porongos (Uruguay)	1–6	(Uruguay) Nacional	Trinidad, Uruguay
20:00 (UTC-3)	C. Rodríguez 15'	Report	Ferro 23'; Regueiro 32'; Vera 43'; Balsas 62', 81'; Cauteruccio 88'	Stadium: Estadio Brigadier Lavalleja; Attendance: 4,000

==== Copa Fontera de la Paz ====
27 June 2010	Nacional (Uruguay)	1–3	(Brazil) Grêmio	Rivera, Uruguay
16:00 (UTC-3)	García 48'	Report	Maylson 36', 39'; Regueiro 57' (o.g.)	Stadium: Estadio Atilio Paiva Olivera; Attendance: 7,000; Referee: Leonardo Gaciba (Brazil)

==== Copa Carlos Gardel ====
23 July 2010 Semifinal	Nacional (Uruguay)	3–0	(Uruguay) Danubio	Tacuarembó, Uruguay
21:10 (UTC-3)	S. García (yellow card) 8'; Cauteruccio 18', 52'; Núñez (yellow card) 20'; Pereyra (yellow card) 40'; Pallas 56' (o.g.); Ferro (yellow card) 82'; Balsas (red card) 83'; Lembo (yellow card) 85'	Report	Vázquez (yellow card) 8'; J. García (yellow card) 20'; Silva (yellow card) 23'; Malrrechaufe (yellow card) 72'	Stadium: Estadio Ingeniero Raùl Goyenola; Attendance: 5,000; Referee: Johny Marcos Sum (Uruguay)

25 July 2010 Final	Deportivo Merlo (Argentina)	0–0 (4–2 p)	(Uruguay) Nacional	Tacuarembó, Uruguay
16:00 (UTC-3)	Ramírez (yellow card) 30'; Tucker (yellow card) 39'	Report	Ferro (yellow card) 39' (yellow-red card) 86'	Stadium: Estadio Ingeniero Raùl Goyenola; Attendance: 1,000; Referee: Luis Buorgeaud (Uruguay)
	Penalties
	Vila (penalty scored); Olivares (penalty scored); Quinteros (penalty scored); Ceballos (penalty scored)		(penalty scored) Lembo; (penalty missed) Cabrera; (penalty missed) Burián; (penalty scored) Goñi

==== Copa Bimbo ====
14 January 2011 Semifinals	Nacional (Uruguay)	2–2 (5–3 p)	(Uruguay) Peñarol	Montevideo, Uruguay
22:15 (UTC-2)	Porta 30'; Coates (yellow card) 53' (goal) 64'	Report	Martinuccio (yellow card) 1' (goal) 20'; Alcoba (yellow card) 63' (goal) 90+1'	Stadium: Estadio Centenario; Attendance: 35,000; Referee: Daniel Fedorczuk (Uruguay)
	Penalties
	H. Peralta (penalty scored); García (penalty scored); Píriz (penalty scored); Viudez (penalty scored); Cabrera (penalty scored)		(penalty missed) Olivera; (penalty scored) Mier; (penalty scored) Estoyanoff; (penalty scored) Albín

16 January 2011 Final	Libertad (Paraguay)	2–2 (3–5 p)	(Uruguay) Nacional	Montevideo, Uruguay
22:30 (UTC-2)	Maciel 7'; Canuto 90+2'	Report	García 5'; Coates (yellow card) 14'; Anderson Silva (yellow card) 40'; Porta 72'	Stadium: Estadio Centenario; Attendance: 10,000; Referee: Roberto Silvera (Uruguay)
	Penalties
	Sarabia (penalty scored); Bonet (penalty missed); Aquino (penalty scored); Ayala (penalty scored)		(penalty scored) Cauteruccio; (penalty scored) Pereyra; (penalty scored) Porta; (penalty scored) García; (penalty scored) Lembo

==== Copa Antel Bicentenario ====
21 January 2011	Peñarol (Uruguay)	2–1	(Uruguay) Nacional	Montevideo, Uruguay
22:00 (UTC-2)	Freitas (yellow card) 1' (yellow-red card) 28'; Albín (yellow card) 12'; Corujo (yellow card) 42'; Olivera 48' (yellow card) 62'; Rodríguez (yellow card) 61'; Domingo (yellow card) 62'; Mier 65'; Sosa (yellow card) 78'	Report	Peralta (yellow card) 5'; Núñez (yellow card) 15'; Cortalezzi 60'	Stadium: Estadio Centenario; Attendance: 35,000; Referee: Héctor Martínez (Uruguay)

==== Noche Alba ====
25 January 2011	Colo-Colo (Chile)	2–3	(Uruguay) Nacional	Santiago, Chile
20:00 (UTC-2)	Ormeño (yellow card) 35'; Castillo (yellow card) 47'; Miralles 55', 82' (pen.)	Report	Porta 48' (pen.), 53'; Cauteruccio 89'	Stadium: Estadio Monumental David Arellano; Attendance: 45,000; Referee: Patricio Polic (Chile)

=== Primera División ===
==== Torneo Apertura ====
Pos	Team	Pld	W	D	L	GF	GA	GD	Pts	Qualification
1	Defensor Sporting	15	9	3	3	31	13	+18	30	Championship Playoffs
2	Nacional	15	8	5	2	28	18	+10	29	
3	Bella Vista	15	9	2	4	24	18	+6	29	
4	El Tanque Sisley	15	8	4	3	21	18	+3	28	
5	Danubio	15	7	5	3	24	14	+10	26	

Rules for classification: 1st points; 2nd goal difference; 3rd goals scored; 4th head-to-head results; 5th draw.

===== Matches =====
25 August 2010	Montevideo Wanderers	1–1	Nacional	Montevideo, Uruguay
17:30 (UTC-3)	Torres (yellow card) 15' (yellow-red card) 84'; Quagliotti (yellow card) 32'; Puerari 46'; Nazario (yellow card) 54'; Ramírez (yellow card) 58'; González (yellow card) 79'; Pereira (yellow card) 90'	Report	Pereyra (yellow card) 41' (goal) 59'; Lembo (yellow card) 53'; Cháves (yellow card) 56'	Stadium: Estadio Centenario; Attendance: 35,000; Referee: Héctor Martínez

29 August 2010	Nacional	0–3	Fénix	Montevideo, Uruguay
15:30 (UTC-3)	Ferro (yellow card) 31'; Núñez (yellow card) 33'; Cauteruccio (yellow card) 41'; Lembo (yellow card) 60'; Porta (yellow card) 84'	Report	Píriz (yellow card) 29'; Pérez 50'; Cardinali 53' (yellow card) 85'; Mier 72'	Stadium: Estadio Gran Parque Central; Attendance: 18,000; Referee: Fernando Falce

4 September 2010	El Tanque Sisley	1–1	Nacional	Montevideo, Uruguay
15:30 (UTC-3)	Morales 34' (pen.); Gutiérrez (yellow card) 60'	Report	Pereyra (yellow card) 42'; García 56'; Gallardo (yellow card) 85'; Peralta (yellow card) 85'; Coates (yellow card) 90'	Stadium: Estadio Centenario; Attendance: 10,000; Referee: Daniel Fedorczuk

19 September 2010	Nacional	1–0	Bella Vista	Montevideo, Uruguay
16:30 (UTC-3)	Pernía (red card) 41'; García 57'; Pereyra (yellow card) 63'	Report	Varela (yellow card) 45'; F. Rodríguez (yellow card) 46'; Palermo (yellow card) 68'; Gutiérrez (yellow card) 89'	Stadium: Estadio Gran Parque Central; Attendance: 22,000; Referee: Darío Ubriaco

25 September 2010	Miramar Misiones	2–4	Nacional	Montevideo, Uruguay
15:30 (UTC-3)	Scotti 20'; Fernández (yellow card) 41'; Medina 74'	Report	García 6', 19'; Goñi (yellow card) 21'; Núñez 70'; Peralta 75' (yellow card) 77'	Stadium: Estadio Centenario; Attendance: 21,000; Referee: Juan Cardellino

3 October 2010	Nacional	0–0	Liverpool	Montevideo, Uruguay
16:30 (UTC-2)	Peralta (yellow card) 10'; Coates (yellow card) 32'; Lembo (yellow card) 84'	Report	Macchi (yellow card) 28'; Pozzi (yellow card) 65'	Stadium: Estadio Gran Parque Central; Attendance: 23,000; Referee: Fredy De Seja

10 October 2010	Cerro	4–1	Nacional	Montevideo, Uruguay
16:30 (UTC-2)	Pallante 2'; Caballero 31' (pen.), 90+2'; Ferreira (yellow card) 36'; O. Pérez 45'	Report	Ferro (yellow card) 30'; Núñez (yellow card) 57'; Palau (yellow card) 59'; S. García (yellow card) 70'; Cabrera 75'	Stadium: Estadio Luis Troccoli; Attendance: 9,000; Referee: Jorge Larrionda

17 October 2010	Racing	2–2	Nacional	Montevideo, Uruguay
16:30 (UTC-2)	Cóccaro 35'; Abero (yellow card) 39'; Barrientos (yellow card) 45+1'; Gómez 72'; D. Flores (yellow card) 81'	Report	García 52' (pen.), 76'; Lembo (yellow card) 53'; Pereyra (yellow card) 80'; Cabrera (yellow card) 88'	Stadium: Estadio Centenario; Attendance: 25,000; Referee: Roberto Silvera

23 October 2010	Nacional	3–0	Tacuarembó	Montevideo, Uruguay
17:00 (UTC-2)	Coates (yellow card) 20'; Ferro (yellow card) 32'; Cabrera (yellow card) 33'; García 38' (pen.), 45'; Cauteruccio 77' (pen.)	Report	Da Silva (red card) 2'; Vinicius (yellow card) 36' (red card) 53'; Rubbo (yellow card) 40'; Galaín (yellow card) 88'	Stadium: Estadio Gran Parque Central; Attendance: 22,500; Referee: Pablo Bentancor

30 October 2010	Nacional	6–1	River Plate	Montevideo, Uruguay
17:00 (UTC-2)	Cauteruccio 49', 75'; Goñi (yellow card) 52'; García 63', 69'; Píriz (yellow card) 64'; Perujo 81'; Núñez 87'	Report	Puppo 31'; Lucas (yellow card) 58' (yellow-red card) 80'	Stadium: Estadio Gran Parque Central; Attendance: 20,000; Referee: Martín Vázquez

7 November 2010	Central Español	1–3	Nacional	Montevideo, Uruguay
17:00 (UTC-2)	Machado 21'; Bueno (yellow card) 28'; Alcoba (yellow card) 45'; Usúcar (yellow card) 55'	Report	Peralta 3'; Ferro (red card) 17'; Coates 29'; Cabrera (yellow card) 36'; García 62'	Stadium: Estadio Centenario; Attendance: 35,000; Referee: Gustavo Siegler

14 November 2010	Nacional	0–0	Peñarol	Montevideo, Uruguay
17:00 (UTC-2)	Pernía (yellow card) 15'; Lembo (yellow card) 84'; Píriz (yellow card) 90'	Report	Arévalo Ríos (yellow card) 10'; Albín (yellow card) 20'; Rodríguez (yellow card) 64'	Stadium: Estadio Centenario; Attendance: 60,000; Referee: Líber Prudente

21 November 2010	Nacional	2–1	Danubio	Montevideo, Uruguay
17:00 (UTC-2)	Peralta (yellow card) 7'; García 14'; Pernía (yellow card) 24'; Godoy (yellow card) 33' (yellow-red card) 66'; Cháves 59' (pen.); Perujo (yellow card) 75'; Flores (red card) 80'; Coates (yellow card) 85'	Report	Míguez (yellow card) 35'; Porras (yellow card) 39'; Vázquez (yellow card) 58'; Malrrechaufe 78'	Stadium: Estadio Centenario; Attendance: 30,000; Referee: Jorge Larrionda

27 November 2010	Defensor Sporting	1–2	Nacional	Montevideo, Uruguay
17:00 (UTC-2)	Mora 28' de Souza (yellow card) 33'; Aranda (yellow card) 55'; D. Suárez (red card) 90'	Report	Cabrera 2'; Lembo (yellow card) 27'; García 34'; Peralta (yellow card) 54'; Pereyra (yellow card) 67'; Ferro (yellow card) 83'; Cháves (yellow card) 90+3'	Stadium: Estadio Centenario; Attendance: 35,000; Referee: Roberto Silvera

5 December 2010	Rampla Juniors	1–2	Nacional	Montevideo, Uruguay
17:00 (UTC-2)	R. García 8'; Dzeruvs (yellow card) 77'	Report	Flores (yellow card) 3'; S. García 12', 81'	Stadium: Estadio Centenario; Attendance: 26,000; Referee: Darío Ubriaco

==== Torneo Clausura ====
Pos	Team	Pld	W	D	L	GF	GA	GD	Pts	Qualification
1	Nacional	15	11	1	3	32	13	+19	34	Championship Playoffs
2	Defensor Sporting	15	8	4	3	19	12	+7	28	
3	Peñarol	15	8	3	4	28	20	+8	27	
4	Fénix	15	7	6	2	23	15	+8	27	
5	Racing	15	7	3	5	26	22	+4	24	

Rules for classification: 1st points; 2nd goal difference; 3rd goals scored; 4th head-to-head results; 5th draw.

===== Matches =====
5 February 2011	Nacional	1–1	Montevideo Wanderers	Montevideo, Uruguay
20:30 (UTC-2)	Pereyra (yellow card) 59'; Quagliotti 64' (o.g.); Fornaroli (yellow card) 67'; Porta (yellow card) 69'; Cabrera (yellow card) 85'; Lembo (yellow card) 88'	Report	Rossano (yellow card) 27'; González (yellow card) 42'; Ostolaza (yellow card) 45+2'; Nanni (yellow card) 65'; Ramírez (yellow card) 75'; Quagliotti 90'	Stadium: Estadio Gran Parque Central; Attendance: 23,000; Referee: Rafael Orfila

11 February 2011	Fénix	2–1	Nacional	Montevideo, Uruguay
20:00 (UTC-2)	Cuello 47'; Sellanes 90+3'	Report	Porta 15'; F. Píriz (yellow card) 27'; Cabrera (yellow card) 49'; Peralta (yellow card) 67'	Stadium: Estadio Centenario; Attendance: 20,000; Referee: Jorge Larrionda

27 February 2011	Bella Vista	0–1	Nacional	Montevideo, Uruguay
19:00 (UTC-2)	Viana (yellow card) 45+2'	Report	Gabriel Marques (yellow card) 50'; García 57'; Peralta (yellow card) 77'	Stadium: Estadio Centenario; Attendance: 20,000; Referee: Fernando Cabrera

6 March 2011	Nacional	3–1	Miramar Misiones	Montevideo, Uruguay
20:30 (UTC-2)	Núñez (yellow card) 26'; Viudez 77'; Pereyra (yellow card) 79'; Lembo (yellow card) 82'; Charquero 83'; Gallardo 90+2'	Report	Zoryes (yellow card) 21'; Aguirre (yellow card) 31'; Paleso 50'; Álvarez (yellow card) 80'	Stadium: Estadio Gran Parque Central; Attendance: 19,000; Referee: Darío Ubriaco

12 March 2011	Liverpool	0–2	Nacional	Montevideo, Uruguay
17:30 (UTC-2)	García 6' (yellow card) 90'; Godoy (yellow card) 13'; Cabrera (yellow card) 64'; Porta 66'; Píriz (yellow card) 78'	Report	Alvez (yellow card) 74'	Stadium: Estadio Centenario; Attendance: 12,000; Referee: Fernando Falce

20 March 2011	Nacional	3–0	Cerro	Montevideo, Uruguay
16:30 (UTC-3)	Porta 28', 66'; Núñez (yellow card) 30'; S. García 85'	Report	Filgueira (yellow card) 43'; E. García (yellow card) 64'; S. Pérez (yellow card) 89'	Stadium: Estadio Gran Parque Central; Attendance: 21,000; Referee: Daniel Fedorczuk

29 March 2011	Nacional	5–2	El Tanque Sisley	Montevideo, Uruguay
21:00 (UTC-3)	Fornaroli 24', 85' (pen.); García 38', 40'; Viudez 46'	Report	Alvez 16'; Fernández (yellow card) 32'; Helha (yellow card) 54'; Coelho 66'	Stadium: Estadio Gran Parque Central; Attendance: 24,000; Referee: Andrés Cunha

2 April 2011	Nacional	3–0	Racing	Montevideo, Uruguay
19:00 (UTC-3)	Píriz (yellow card) 37'; García 65'; Charquero (yellow card) 78' (goal) 83'; Gallardo 81'	Report	Barrientos (yellow card) 31'; Goñi (yellow card) 46' (yellow-red card) 80'; D. Flores (yellow card) 86'; Contreras (yellow card) 88'	Stadium: Estadio Gran Parque Central; Attendance: 23,000; Referee: Martín Vázquez

10 April 2011	Tacuarembó	0–3	Nacional	Montevideo, Uruguay
16:30 (UTC-3)	Cecatto (yellow card) 33'; Abascal (yellow card) 54'; Robson (yellow card) 84'	Report	Fornaroli 9', 53'; Coates (yellow card) 34'; García 42'; Peralta (yellow card) 54'	Stadium: Estadio Centenario; Attendance: 22,000; Referee: Yimmy Álvarez

15 April 2011	River Plate	4–2	Nacional	Montevideo, Uruguay
16:00 (UTC-3)	Medina 31', 63' (pen.); R. Cabrera (yellow card) 40'; Porras (yellow card) 45'; Gaglianone (yellow card) 48'; Ramírez 76'; Correa 90+3'	Report	Fornaroli (yellow card) 45+2'; Carlão 47' (yellow card) 60'; Gallardo 74' (pen.); Núñez (yellow card) 82'	Stadium: Estadio Centenario; Attendance: 20,000; Referee: Jorge Larrionda

23 April 2011	Nacional	3–1	Central Español	Montevideo, Uruguay
16:00 (UTC-3)	Viudez 8'; Píriz (yellow card) 41' (goal) 47'; López 62'	Report	Alcoba (yellow card) 21'; Souza 81'	Stadium: Estadio Gran Parque Central; Referee: Fernando Cabrera

8 May 2011 Copa 50 Aniversario de Montecarlo	Peñarol	0–1	Nacional	Montevideo, Uruguay
15:30 (UTC-3)	Freitas (yellow card) 51'; G. Rodríguez (red card) 90+4'	Report	Rolín (yellow card) 50'; García 62' (yellow card) 82'; Píriz (yellow card) 63'	Stadium: Estadio Centenario; Attendance: 55,000; Referee: Martín Vázquez

21 May 2011	Danubio	0–1	Nacional	Montevideo, Uruguay
16:00 (UTC-3)	Míguez (yellow card) 23'; S. Píriz (yellow card) 41'	Report	Marques (yellow card) 18'; Pereyra 46'; Rolín (yellow card) 77'	Stadium: Estadio Centenario; Attendance: 24,000; Referee: Héctor Martínez

28 May 2011	Nacional	3–0	Defensor Sporting	Montevideo, Uruguay
16:00 (UTC-3)	Porta 6' (yellow card) 24'; Pereyra (yellow card) 14'; García (yellow card) 44'; López 70', 72'	Report	M. Risso (red card) 64'; Argachá (yellow card) 66'	Stadium: Estadio Gran Parque Central; Attendance: 27,500; Referee: Roberto Silvera

3 June 2011	Nacional	0–2	Rampla Juniors	Montevideo, Uruguay
16:00 (UTC-3)	Jadson Viera (yellow card) 24'; Anderson Silva (yellow card) 78'	Report	Moreno Asprilla 4'; Lalinde 23'	Stadium: Estadio Gran Parque Central; Attendance: 16,000; Referee: Daniel Fedorczuk

==== Aggregate table ====
Pos	Team	Pld	W	D	L	GF	GA	GD	Pts	Qualification
1	Nacional	30	19	6	5	60	31	+29	63	2012 Copa Libertadores Second Stage and 2011 Copa Sudamericana Second Stage (Note: Nacional qualified for the 2011 Copa Sudamericana as the Primera División champion.) (Note: As Nacional defeated Defensor Sporting in the initial playoff and became champion, the final was not played, and Defensor Sporting became the runner-up as the 2nd best team in the aggregate table. Both Nacional and Defensor Sporting qualified for the 2012 Copa Libertadores group stage.)
2	Defensor Sporting	30	17	7	6	50	25	+25	58	2012 Copa Libertadores Second Stage
3	Peñarol	30	15	7	8	52	37	+15	52	2012 Copa Libertadores First Stage
4	Fénix	30	11	12	7	44	35	+9	45	2011 Copa Sudamericana First Stage
5	Bella Vista	30	12	8	10	40	36	+4	44	2011 Copa Sudamericana First Stage

Rules for classification: 1st points; 2nd goal difference; 3rd goals scored; 4th head-to-head results; 5th draw.

==== Relegation ====
Pos	Team	Pld	W	D	L	GF	GA	GD	Pts
1	Nacional	60	40	9	11	123	57	+66	126 (Note: Nacional was docked three points in the last season.)
2	Peñarol	60	36	13	11	120	71	+49	121
3	Defensor Sporting	60	30	14	16	99	69	+30	104
4	Liverpool	60	24	19	17	93	74	+19	91
5	Bella Vista	30	12	8	10	41	38	+3	88 (Note: Having only played one season in the Primera División, Bella Vista's, El Tanque Sisley's, and Miramar Misiones' points are doubled for the relegation table.)

Rules for classification: 1st points; 2nd goal difference; 3rd goals scored; 4th head-to-head results; 5th draw.

==== Championship playoff ====
12 June 2011	Defensor Sporting	0–1	Nacional	Montevideo, Uruguay
(UTC-3)	Moiraghi (yellow card) 43'; Diego Martín Rodríguez (yellow card) 48'; Luna (red card) 89'	Report	Viudez 19'; Gabriel Marques (yellow card) 39'; Píriz (yellow card) 73'	Stadium: Estadio Centenario; Attendance: 50,000; Referee: Darío Ubriaco

=== Copa Libertadores ===
Group 3
Pos	Team	Pld	W	D	L	GF	GA	GD	Pts
1	(Mexico) América	6	3	1	2	8	7	+1	10
2	(Brazil) Fluminense	6	2	2	2	9	9	0	8
3	(Uruguay) Nacional	6	2	2	2	3	3	0	8
4	(Argentina) Argentinos Juniors	6	2	1	3	9	10	−1	7

15 February 2011 Second Stage	América (Mexico)	2–0	(Uruguay) Nacional	Mexico City, Mexico
21:00 (UTC−06:00)	Sánchez 3'; Vuoso 48'; Mosquera (yellow card) 54'	Report	Flores (yellow card) 47'; García (yellow card) 54'	Stadium: Estadio Azteca; Attendance: 30,000; Referee: Óscar Ruiz (Colombia)

23 February 2011 Second Stage	Fluminense (Brazil)	0–0	(Uruguay) Nacional	Rio de Janeiro, Brazil
21:50 (UTC−03:00)	Conca (yellow card) 10'; Diguinho (yellow card) 47'; Rafael Moura (yellow card) 52'; Leandro Euzébio (yellow card) 84'	Report	Fornaroli (yellow card) 5'; Cabrera (yellow card) 30'; Píriz (yellow card) 34'; García (yellow card) 62'; Lembo (yellow card) 89'	Stadium: Estádio Olímpico João Havelange; Attendance: 10,000; Referee: Carlos Amarilla (Paraguay)

2 March 2011 Second Stage	Nacional (Uruguay)	0–1	(Argentina) Argentinos Juniors	Montevideo, Uruguay
20:30 (UTC−02:00)	Peralta (yellow card) 82'	Rport	Niell 21' (yellow card) 56'; Escudero (yellow card) 28'; Laba (yellow card) 75'; Rius (yellow card) 80'	Stadium: Estadio Gran Parque Central; Attendance: 23,000; Referee: Antonio Arias (Paraguay)

15 March 2011 Second Stage	Argentinos Juniors (Argentina)	0–1	(Uruguay) Nacional	Buenos Aires, Argentina
21:30 (UTC−03:00)	Hernández (yellow card) 62'; Escudero (yellow card) 88'	Report	García 34'; Godoy (yellow card) 42'; Jadson Viera (yellow card) 76'	Stadium: Estadio Diego Armando Maradona; Attendance: 20,000; Referee: Enrique Osses (Chile)

April 6, 2011 Second Stage	Nacional (Uruguay)	2–0	(Brazil) Fluminense	Montevideo, Uruguay
21:45 (UTC−3)	García 50', 67'; Godoy (yellow card) 73'; Gallardo (yellow card) 85' (yellow-red card) 86'	Report	Rafael Moura (yellow card) 90+1'	Stadium: Estadio Gran Parque Central; Attendance: 61,000; Referee: Óscar Ruiz (Colombia)

20 April 2011 Second Stage	Nacional (Uruguay)	0–0	(Mexico) América	Montevideo, Uruguay
21:50 (UTC−03:00)	Jadson Viera (yellow card) 44'; Coates (yellow card) 60'; Gabriel Marques (yellow card) 90'	Report	Rojas (yellow card) 42'; Mosquera (yellow card) 64'	Stadium: Estadio Gran Parque Central; Attendance: 50,000; Referee: Victor Hugo Carillo (Peru)

== Player statistics ==
Num	Pos	Player	Primera División				Copa Libertadores			
Num	Pos	Player	App	Goal	Yellow card	Red card	App	Goal	Yellow card	Red card
1	DF	Leonardo Burián	8+0	-10	0	0	4+0	-3	0	0
2	DF	Alejandro Lembo	28+1	0	8	0	3+0	0	0	0
3	DF	Jadson Viera	2+3	0	1	0	3+0	0	2	0
4	DF	Christian Núñez	22+1	2	5	0	4+0	0	0	0
5	MF	Anderson Silva	1+4	0	1	0	0+1	0	0	0
6	FW	Nicolás Vigneri	1+4	0	0	0	1+1	0	0	0
7	FW	Jonathan Charquero	2+2	2	1	0	2+1	0	0	0
8	FW	Matías Cabrera	18+7	2	6	0	5+1	0	1	0
9	FW	Bruno Fornaroli	7+1	4	2	0	3+1	0	1	0
10	MF	Marcelo Gallardo	1+12	3	1	0	0+2	0	1	1
11	MF	Horacio Peralta	14+5	2	8	0	1+0	0	1	0
13	DF	Gabriel Marques	9+1	0	3	0	5+0	0	1	0
14	MF	Robert Flores	12+3	0	1	1	2+0	0	1	0
15	MF	Tabaré Viudez	11+1	4	0	0	5+1	0	0	0
16	DF	Carlão	1+3	1	1	0	0+2	0	0	0
17	MF	Maximiliano Calzada	3+3	0	0	0	0+4	0	0	0
18	DF	Gonzalo Godoy	12+1	0	2	1	3+0	0	2	0
19	DF	Sebastián Coates	28+0	1	5	0	5+0	0	1	0
20	FW	Santiago García	25+3	23	4	0	5+1	3	2	0
21	DF	Flavio Córdoba	2+1	0	0	0	1+1	0	0	0
22	MF	Mauricio Pereyra	22+4	2	8	0	4+1	0	0	0
23	MF	Facundo Píriz	19+2	1	8	0	6+0	0	1	0
24	FW	Richard Porta	15+4	5	3	0	2+1	0	0	0
25	GK	Rodrigo Muñoz	23+0	-20	0	0	2+0	0	0	0
—	DF	Ernesto Goñi	3+0	0	2	0	0+0	0	0	0
—	DF	Mariano Pernía	7+0	0	2	1	0+0	0	0	0
—	DF	Julián Perujo	3+3	1	1	0	0+0	0	0	0
—	DF	Diego Rodríguez	3+0	0	0	0	0+0	0	0	0
—	DF	Alexis Rolín	4+0	0	2	0	0+0	0	0	0
—	MF	Raúl Ferro	9+2	0	4	1	0+0	0	0	0
—	MF	Mathías Mirabaje	5+4	0	0	0	0+0	0	0	0
—	MF	Marcelo Palau	7+0	0	1	0	0+0	0	0	0
—	FW	Martín Cauteruccio	7+6	3	1	0	0+0	0	0	0
—	FW	Diego Cháves	4+6	1	2	0	0+0	0	0	0
—	FW	Gonzalo Bueno	0+1	0	0	0	0+0	0	0	0
—	FW	Renato César	1+0	0	0	0	0+0	0	0	0
—	FW	Nicolás López	2+2	3	0	0	0+0	0	0	0
—	FW	Rodrigo Roque	1+0	0	0	0	0+0	0	0	0

Last updated on June 12, 2011.
Note: Players in italics left the club mid-season.

== See also ==
- 2010–11 in Uruguayan football
