= 2011 Campeonato Internacional de Verano =

Tournament details
- Host country: Uruguay
- Dates: 14 January – 16 January
- Teams: 4 (from 1 confederation)
- Venue: 1 (in 1 host city)

Final positions
- Champions: (Uruguay) Nacional (2nd title)
- Runners-up: (Paraguay) Libertad
- Third place: (Uruguay) Peñarol
- Fourth place: (Argentina) Vélez Sársfield

Tournament statistics
- Matches played: 4
- Goals scored: 13 (3.25 per match)
- Top scorer(s): (Australia) Richard Porta (2 goals)
- Best player: (Uruguay) Sebastián Coates

The 2011 Campeonato Internacional de Verano, also known as Copa Bimbo for sponsoring purposes, is the third edition of the Campeonato Internacional de Verano, an exhibition international club football competition that featured two clubs from Uruguay (Nacional and Peñarol), one from Paraguay (Libertad) and one from Argentina (Vélez Sársfield). It is played in Montevideo, Uruguay at the Estadio Centenario from 14 to 16 January 2011.

== Bracket ==
Semi-finals
(Paraguay) Libertad	1
(Argentina) Vélez Sársfield	0
(Uruguay) Nacional (pen.)	2 (5)
(Uruguay) Peñarol	2 (3)

Final
(Paraguay) Libertad	2 (3)
(Uruguay) Nacional (pen.)	2 (5)
Third place
(Argentina) Vélez Sársfield	2 (2)
(Uruguay) Peñarol (pen.)	2 (4)

== Matches ==
=== Semi-finals ===
14 January 2011
20:00 (UTC-2)

Libertad (Paraguay)	1 – 0	(Argentina) Vélez Sársfield
Rodolfo Gamarra 38'	Report

Estadio Centenario, Montevideo
Attendance: 35,000
Referee: Jorge Larrionda (Uruguay)

14 January 2011
22:15 (UTC-2)

Nacional (Uruguay)	2 – 2	(Uruguay) Peñarol
Porta 30'; Coates 64'	Report	Martinuccio 20'; Alcoba 90+2'
Penalties
H. Peralta (penalty scored); García (penalty scored); Píriz (penalty scored); Viudez (penalty scored); Cabrera (penalty scored)	5 – 3	(penalty missed) Olivera; (penalty scored) Mier; (penalty scored) Estoyanoff; (penalty scored) Albín

Estadio Centenario, Montevideo
Attendance: 35,000
Referee: Daniel Fedorczuk (Uruguay)

=== Third place ===
16 January 2011
20:00 (UTC-2)

Vélez Sársfield (Argentina)	2 – 2	(Uruguay) Peñarol
Díaz 10'; Bella 29'	Report	Olivera 41'; Alonso 86' (pen.)
Penalties
Razotti (penalty scored); Canteros (penalty missed); Freire (penalty missed); Rescaldani (penalty scored)	2 – 4	(penalty scored) Mier; (penalty scored) Domingo; (penalty scored) Mac Eachen; (penalty scored) Aguiar

Estadio Centenario, Montevideo
Attendance: 5,000
Referee: Líber Prudente (Uruguay)

=== Final ===
16 January 2011
22:30 (UTC-2)

Libertad (Paraguay)	2 – 2	(Uruguay) Nacional
Maciel 7'; Canuto 90+3'	Report	García 5'; Porta 72'
Penalties
Sarabia (penalty scored); Bonet (penalty missed); Aquino (penalty scored); Ayala (penalty scored)	3 – 5	(penalty scored) Cauteruccio; (penalty scored) Pereyra; (penalty scored) Porta; (penalty scored) García; (penalty scored) Lembo

Estadio Centenario, Montevideo
Attendance: 10,000
Referee: Roberto Silvera (Uruguay)

Libertad	Nacional

LIBERTAD:
GK	12	(Paraguay) Tobías Vargas
RB	11	(Paraguay) Carlos Bonet
CB	14	(Paraguay) Pedro Sarabia (c)
CB	22	(Argentina) Ignacio Canuto
LB	15	(Paraguay) Miguel Samudio	(substituted off) 83'
DM	18	(Paraguay) Víctor Cáceres
LW	27	(Paraguay) Jorge González	(substituted off) 71'
AM	16	(Paraguay) Sergio Aquino
LW	23	(Paraguay) Rodolfo Gamarra
FW	20	(Paraguay) Manuel Maciel	(substituted off) 67'
FW	29	(Paraguay) Ángel Orué
Substitutes:
GK	1	(Paraguay) Bernardo Medina
DF	3	(Paraguay) Arnaldo Vera	(substituted on) 83'
MF	5	(Paraguay) Víctor Ayala	(substituted on) 71'
FW	19	(Paraguay) Nelson Romero	(substituted on) 67'
Manager:
(Uruguay) Gregorio Pérez

NACIONAL:
GK	1	(Uruguay) Leonardo Burián
CB	18	(Uruguay) Gonzalo Godoy
CB	19	(Uruguay) Sebastián Coates (c)	(yellow card) 14'	(substituted off) 58'
CB	2	(Uruguay) Alejandro Lembo
DM	23	(Uruguay) Facundo Píriz		(substituted off) 27'
AM	22	(Uruguay) Mauricio Pereyra
AM	14	(Uruguay) Robert Flores		(substituted off) 48'
AM	8	(Uruguay) Matías Cabrera
FW	11	(Uruguay) Horacio Peralta		(substituted off) 46'
FW	20	(Uruguay) Santiago García
FW	10	(Uruguay) Tabaré Viudez		(substituted off) 67'
Substitutes:
GK	25	(Uruguay) Rodrigo Muñoz
DF	3	(Uruguay) Alexis Rolín		(substituted on) 58'
DF	15	(Uruguay) Julián Perujo
MF	5	(Brazil) Anderson Silva	(yellow card) 40'	(substituted on) 27'
MF	17	(Uruguay) Maximiliano Calzada		(substituted on) 48'
FW	7	(Uruguay) Martín Cauteruccio		(substituted on) 67'
FW	9	(Uruguay) Jonathan Charquero
FW	24	(Australia) Richard Porta		(substituted on) 46'
Manager:
(Uruguay) Juan Ramón Carrasco

Man of the match:
(Uruguay) Leonardo Burián
Assistant referees:
(Uruguay) Miguel Nievas
(Uruguay) Carlos Pastorino
Fourth official:
(Uruguay) Líber Prudente

Copa Bimbo
2011 Winners

Nacional
2nd title

== Scorers ==
2 goals

- (Australia) Richard Porta (Nacional)

1 goal

- (Paraguay) Rodolfo Gamarra (Libertad)
- (Argentina) Alejandro Martinuccio (Peñarol)
- (Uruguay) Sebastián Coates (Nacional)
- (Uruguay) Gabriel Alcoba (Peñarol)
- (Argentina) Gastón Díaz (Vélez Sársfield)
- (Argentina) Iván Bella (Vélez Sársfield)
- (Uruguay) Juan Manuel Olivera (Peñarol)
- (Uruguay) Diego Alonso (Peñarol)
- (Uruguay) Santiago García (Nacional)
- (Paraguay) Víctor Aquino (Libertad)
- (Argentina) Ignacio Canuto (Libertad)
