= 2007–08 Campeonato Uruguayo Primera División =

105th season of the top-tier football league in Uruguay

Primera División Uruguaya
- Season: 2007−08
- Champions: Defensor Sporting (4th title)
- Relegated: Fénix; Miramar Misiones; Progreso
- Copa Libertadores: Defensor Sporting (Group Stage); Nacional (Group Stage); Peñarol (Preliminary Round)
- Copa Sudamericana: Defensor Sporting (First Round); River Plate (Preliminary Round)
- Top goalscorer: Richard Porta; Christian Stuani (19 goals each)

The 2007−08 season of the Primera División Uruguaya is the 76th professional season of Uruguay's top-flight football league.

== Teams ==
Team	Home city	Stadium
Bella Vista	Montevideo	Estadio José Nasazzi
Central Español	Montevideo	Parque Palermo
Cerro	Montevideo	Estadio Luis Tróccoli
Danubio	Montevideo	Jardines Del Hipódromo
Defensor Sporting	Montevideo	Estadio Luis Franzini
Fénix	Montevideo	Estadio Parque Capurro
Juventud	Las Piedras	Estadio Martínez Monegal
Liverpool	Montevideo	Estadio Belvedere
Miramar Misiones	Montevideo	Parque Luis Méndez Piana
Nacional	Montevideo	Estadio Gran Parque Central
Peñarol	Montevideo	Estadio Centenario
Progreso	Montevideo	Parque Abraham Paladino
Rampla Juniors	Montevideo	Estadio Olímpico
River Plate	Montevideo	Estadio Saroldi
Tacuarembó	Tacuarembó	Estadio Goyenola
Wanderers	Montevideo	Estadio Viera

== Torneo Apertura ==
Pos	Team	Pld	W	D	L	GF	GA	GD	Pts
1	Defensor Sporting (A)	15	11	2	2	26	10	+16	35
2	Danubio	15	9	4	2	34	14	+20	31
3	Rampla Juniors	15	9	4	2	21	12	+9	31
4	River Plate	15	7	3	5	37	27	+10	24
5	Nacional	15	6	6	3	19	12	+7	24
6	Juventud	15	6	6	3	16	10	+6	24
7	Cerro	15	5	8	2	16	14	+2	23
8	Montevideo Wanderers	15	6	3	6	24	26	−2	21
9	Fénix	15	4	8	3	14	14	0	20
10	Central Español	15	5	3	7	22	28	−6	18
11	Peñarol	15	4	5	6	21	23	−2	17
12	Tacuarembó	15	4	5	6	15	21	−6	17
13	Miramar Misiones	15	4	1	10	9	20	−11	13
14	Liverpool	15	3	3	9	19	24	−5	12
15	Progreso	15	3	2	10	14	38	−24	11
16	Bella Vista	15	1	3	11	14	18	−4	6

Updated to match(es) played on December 9, 2007. Source: RSSSF
Rules for classification: 1. Points.
(A) Advance to a further round

=== Top scorers ===
Pos	Player	Team	Goals
1	Richard Porta	River Plate	19
1	Christian Stuani	Danubio	19
3	Nicolás Nicolay	Tacuarembó	9
4	Alvaro Navarro	Defensor Sporting	8
5	José Franco	Peñarol	6
5	Danilo Peinado	Wanderers	6
7	Osvaldo Canobbio	Liverpool	5
7	Sebastián Fernández	Defensor Sporting	5
7	Bruno Fornaroli	Nacional	5
7	Germán Hornos	Central Español	5
7	Mathías Riquero	Progreso	5
7	Julio Rodríguez	Wanderers	5

== Torneo Clausura ==
Pos	Team	Pld	W	D	L	GF	GA	GD	Pts
1	River Plate	15	12	1	2	48	17	+31	37
2	Peñarol (O, A)	15	12	1	2	40	15	+25	37
3	Liverpool	15	9	4	2	36	21	+15	31
4	Defensor Sporting	15	10	1	4	41	27	+14	31
5	Nacional	15	10	1	4	33	21	+12	31
6	Montevideo Wanderers	15	7	2	6	20	25	−5	23
7	Progreso	15	6	0	9	23	30	−7	18
8	Bella Vista	15	5	2	8	17	24	−7	17
9	Tacuarembó	15	5	2	8	18	29	−11	17
10	Juventud	15	4	4	7	14	19	−5	16
11	Rampla Juniors	15	4	4	7	13	32	−19	16
12	Danubio	15	4	3	8	24	33	−9	15
13	Central Español	15	4	2	9	16	24	−8	14
14	Miramar Misiones	15	4	2	9	18	27	−9	14
15	Cerro	15	4	2	9	14	25	−11	14
16	Fénix	15	3	3	9	19	25	−6	12

Updated to match(es) played on June 1, 2008. Source: RSSSF
Rules for classification: 1. Points.
(A) Advance to a further round; (O) Play-off winners

=== Clausura tiebreaker ===
Team 1	Score	Team 2
River Plate (Uruguay)	3−5	(Uruguay) Peñarol

=== Top scorers ===
Pos	Player	Team	Goals
1	Paulo Pezzolano	Liverpool	12
2	Carlos Bueno	Peñarol	11
2	Henry Giménez	River Plate	11
4	Sergio Souza	River Plate	10
4	Bruno Fornaroli	Nacional	10
6	Jonathan Urretavizcaya	River Plate	9
6	Diego Ifrán	Fénix	9

== Aggregate table ==
Pos	Team	Pld	W	D	L	GF	GA	GD	Pts	Qualification
1	Defensor Sporting (Q, A)	30	21	3	6	67	37	+30	66	Liguilla Pre-Libertadores
2	River Plate (Q)	30	19	4	7	85	44	+41	61	Liguilla Pre-Libertadores
3	Nacional (Q)	30	16	7	7	52	33	+19	55	Liguilla Pre-Libertadores
4	Peñarol (Q)	30	16	6	8	61	38	+23	54	Liguilla Pre-Libertadores
5	Rampla Juniors (Q)	30	13	8	9	34	44	−10	47	Liguilla Pre-Libertadores
6	Danubio (Q)	30	13	7	10	58	47	+11	46	Liguilla Pre-Libertadores
7	Montevideo Wanderers	30	13	5	12	44	51	−7	44	
8	Liverpool	30	12	7	11	55	45	+10	43	
9	Juventud	30	10	10	10	30	29	+1	40	
10	Cerro	30	9	10	11	30	39	−9	37	
11	Tacuarembó	30	9	7	14	33	50	−17	34	
12	Fénix	30	7	11	12	33	39	−6	32	
13	Central Español	30	9	5	16	38	52	−14	32	
14	Progreso	30	9	2	19	37	68	−31	29	
15	Miramar Misiones	30	8	3	19	27	47	−20	27	
16	Bella Vista	30	6	5	19	31	52	−21	23	

Updated to match(es) played on June 1, 2008. Source: RSSSF
Rules for classification: 1. Points.
(A) Advance to a further round; (Q) Qualified for the phase indicated

== Championship playoff ==
The Apertura and Clausura winners will play a semifinal match. The winner will advance to the final and play against the best team in the aggregate table.

=== Semifinal ===
Team 1	Agg.	Team 2	1st leg	2nd leg
Peñarol	1−2	Defensor Sporting	1−2	0−0

=== Final ===
Since Defensor Sporting was the best team in the aggregate as well as the semifinal winner, they were automatically declared the champion.

Primera División
2007–08 champion
Defensor Sporting
4th title

== Relegation table ==
The relegation table is an aggregate of the past two Primera División seasons, with the exception of the Liguilla Pre-Libertadores and any playoffs. Teams that were promoted for this season had their statistics doubled. The three lowest teams will be relegated for the next season.

Pos	Team	Pld	W	D	L	GF	GA	GD	Pts	Relegation
1	Defensor Sporting	60	38	11	11	124	69	+55	125	
2	Peñarol	60	35	13	12	125	76	+49	118	
3	Danubio	60	34	10	16	120	74	+46	112	
4	Nacional	60	29	13	18	94	77	+17	100	
5	River Plate	60	28	13	19	126	91	+35	97	
6	Montevideo Wanderers	60	29	10	21	97	90	+7	97	
7	Liverpool	60	24	13	23	102	89	+13	85	
8	Juventud	60	20	20	20	60	58	+2	80 (Note: Since Cerro, Fénix, and Juventud were promoted from the previous season, their statistics were doubled.)	
9	Rampla Juniors	60	21	16	23	69	91	−22	79	
10	Bella Vista	60	22	8	30	79	90	−11	74	
11	Cerro	60	18	20	22	60	78	−18	74	
12	Tacuarembó	60	17	19	24	73	89	−16	70	
13	Central Español	60	19	9	32	69	100	−31	66	
14	Fénix (R)	60	14	22	24	66	78	−12	64	Relegation to Segunda División
15	Miramar Misiones (R)	60	17	10	33	63	93	−30	61	Relegation to Segunda División
16	Progreso (R)	60	16	12	32	75	120	−45	60	Relegation to Segunda División

Updated to match(es) played on June 1, 2008. Source: RSSSF
Rules for classification: 1) points; 2) goal difference; 3) number of goals scored.
(R) Relegated

== Liguilla Pre-Libertadores ==
Pos	Team	Pld	W	D	L	GF	GA	GD	Pts	Qualification
1	Nacional (Q)	5	3	1	1	12	7	+5	10	2009 Copa Libertadores Second Stage
2	Defensor Sporting (Q)	5	3	1	1	8	4	+4	10	2009 Copa Libertadores Second Stage (Note: Defensor Sporting also qualified to the 2008 Copa Sudamericana First Stage.)
3	Peñarol (Q)	5	2	2	1	9	8	+1	8	2009 Copa Libertadores First Stage
4	River Plate (Q)	5	1	2	2	8	10	−2	5	2008 Copa Sudamericana Preliminary
5	Danubio	5	1	1	3	4	6	−2	4	
6	Rampla Juniors	5	1	1	3	5	11	−6	4	

Updated to match(es) played on July 20, 2008. Source: RSSSF
Rules for classification: 1. Points
(Q) Qualified for the phase indicated

=== Liguilla 1st place tiebreaker ===
The winner of the match earns the Uruguay 1 spot in the 2009 Copa Libertadores; the loser gets the Uruguay 2 spot.

2008-07-27

Nacional	1 – 0	Defensor Sporting
García 69'

Estadio Centenario, Montevideo
Referee: Larrionda

== See also ==
- 2007–08 in Uruguayan football
