= Simón Ramírez =

Simón Ramírez may refer to:

- Simón Darío Ramírez (1930–1992), Venezuelan poet
- Simón Ramírez (footballer, born 1985), Argentine footballer
- Simón Ramírez (footballer, born 1998), Chilean footballer
