= Diego Rodríguez =

Diego Rodríguez may refer to:

== Politicians ==
- Diego Rodríguez Porcelos (died 885), son and successor of Rodrigo, count of Castile
- Diego Sinhué Rodríguez Vallejo (born 1980), Mexican politician, governor of Guanajuato (since 2018)
- Diego Rodriguez (Arizona politician), U.S. politician, Arizona State Representative

== Sportspeople ==
- Diego Rodríguez (footballer, born 1960), Spanish football defender
- Diego Rodríguez (footballer, born 1986), Uruguayan football left-back
- Diego Rodríguez (footballer, born 1988) (1988–2010), Uruguayan football defender
- Diego Rodríguez (footballer, born 1989), Uruguayan football defensive midfielder
- Diego Rodríguez (goalkeeper) (born 1989), Argentine football goalkeeper
- Diego Rodríguez (footballer, born 1991), Uruguayan football defender
- Diego Rodríguez (footballer, born 1995), Honduran football left-back

== Other ==
- Diego Rodríguez (mathematician) (1569–1668), mathematician, astronomer, educator and technological innovator in New Spain
- Diego Rodríguez (son of El Cid) (died 1097), died during the Battle of Consuegra

== See also ==
- Diogo Rodrigues (died 1577), Portuguese explorer
- Diego Rodrigues (born 2005), Portuguese footballer
