= Danilo Cóccaro =

Uruguayan footballer (born 1991)

Personal information
- Full name: Erardo Danilo Cóccaro Díaz
- Date of birth: 22 August 1991 (age 35)
- Place of birth: Montevideo, Uruguay
- Height: 1.79 m (5 ft 10 in)
- Position: Forward

Team information
- Current team: Cerro
- Number: 17

Senior career*
Years	Team	Apps	(Gls)
2008–2009	Progreso		(10)
2009–2011	Racing	25	(2)
2011–2012	Rentistas	19	(4)
2012–2013	Dinamo Minsk	21	(2)
2013–2016	Rentistas	61	(4)
2016–2017	Fuerza Amarilla	31	(5)
2017–2018	Progreso	37	(7)
2020–2021	Villa Teresa	33	(4)
2022–	Cerro	46	(5)

International career
2010	Uruguay U20		
- * Club domestic league appearances and goals as of 14 September 2024

Erardo Danilo Cóccaro Díaz (born 22 August 1991) is an Uruguayan football player who plays for Cerro in Uruguay.

== National ==
He has been capped by the Uruguay national under-20 football team for the pre-squad for the 2011 South American Youth Championship.
