= Matías Quagliotti =

Uruguayan footballer (born 1985)

Personal information
- Full name: Matías Quagliotti
- Date of birth: 17 August 1985 (age 41)
- Place of birth: Trinidad, Uruguay
- Height: 1.92 m (6 ft 4 in)
- Position: Defender

Senior career*
Years	Team	Apps	(Gls)
2006–2011	Montevideo Wanderers	84	(9)
2012	Racing Club	15	(0)
2012–2014	Deportivo Táchira	6	(0)
2014̣–2015	Montevideo Wanderers	11	(2)
- * Club domestic league appearances and goals as of 20:58, 10 August 2019 (UTC)

Matías Quagliotti (born 17 August 1985 in Trinidad) is a Uruguayan footballer who most recently played for Montevideo Wanderers in the Uruguayan Primera División.
