= Tobías Vargas =

Paraguayan footballer (born 1989)

Personal information
- Full name: Tobias Antonio Vargas Insfrán
- Date of birth: 21 August 1989 (age 37)
- Height: 1.83 m (6 ft 0 in)
- Position: Goalkeeper

Team information
- Current team: Fuerza Amarilla S.C.
- Number: 12

Senior career*
Years	Team	Apps	(Gls)
2009–2015	Libertad	43	(0)
2012	→ Sportivo Luqueño (loan)	37	(0)
2013	→ Capiatá (loan)	35	(1)
2014	→ Sportivo Luqueño (loan)	10	(0)
2014–2015	→ Capiatá (loan)	24	(0)
2015	Nacional Potosí	0	(0)
2015	Deportivo Capiatá	1	(0)
2016	Rubio Ñú	24	(0)
2017–	Sportivo Luqueño	18	(0)
2019–	Fuerza Amarilla S.C.	5	(0)

International career^{‡}
2012	Paraguay	1	(0)
- * Club domestic league appearances and goals as of 23:20, 17 March 2019 (UTC) ‡ National team caps and goals as of 23:09, 25 April 2014 (UTC)

Tobías Antonio Vargas (born 21 August 1989) is a Paraguayan international footballer who plays for Fuerza Amarilla S.C. in the Ecuadorian Serie A, as a goalkeeper.

== Career ==
Vargas has played club football for Libertad, Sportivo Luqueño and Capiatá.

He made his international debut for Paraguay in 2012.
