= Lucas Ruiz Díaz =

Argentine footballer

Personal information
- Full name: Lucas Aarón Ruiz Díaz Cajal
- Date of birth: February 19, 1990 (age 36)
- Place of birth: Buenos Aires, Argentina
- Height: 1.75 m (5 ft 9 in)
- Position: Defensive midfielder

Team information
- Current team: Villa Teresa
- Number: 13

Youth career
- –2010: Nacional

Senior career*
Years	Team	Apps	(Gls)
2010	Plaza Colonia	11	(0)
2011–2012	El Tanque Sisley	3	(0)
2012–2016	Plaza Colonia	33	(1)
2016–2018	Huracán	27	(2)
2018–2020	Plaza Colonia	12	(1)
2020-	Club Atlético Villa Teresa		
- * Club domestic league appearances and goals as of 15:22, 7 October 2019 (UTC)

Lucas Aarón Ruiz Díaz Cajal (born February 19, 1990) is an Argentine football player currently playing for Villa Teresa of the Uruguayan Segunda División Profesional.
