= Nicolás Nicolay =

Argentine footballer

Nicolás Andrés Nicolay (born 9 October 1979) is an Argentine former professional footballer who played as a forward. His career began at the largest club in his province, Ferro Carril Oeste of General Pico.

== Clubs ==
- Banfield 1998
- Huracán Buceo 1999
- Cruz Azul 1999–2000
- Colón de Santa Fe 2001–2002
- Villa Española 2003–2004
- Rampla Juniors 2005–2006
- Tacuarembó 2007
- Bella Vista 2008
- River Plate 2008
- Tacuarembó 2009
- Central Español 2010
- Ferro Carril Oeste 2011–2013
- General Paz Juniors 2013–2014
- Tacuarembó 2014–2015
