= Ronald Ramírez =

Uruguayan footballer (born 1976)

Personal information
- Full name: Ronald Andrés Ramírez Villa
- Date of birth: 23 November 1976 (age 49)
- Place of birth: Montevideo, Uruguay
- Height: 1.79 m (5 ft 10 in)
- Position: Midfielder

Senior career*
| Years | Team | Apps | (Gls) |
| 1998–2003 | Montevideo Wanderers | | |
| 2004 | San Luis | 15 | (0) |
| 2004 | Montevideo Wanderers | | |
| 2005–2006 | Peñarol | | |
| 2006–2007 | Montevideo Wanderers | 21 | (8) |
| 2007 | Independiente Santa Fe | 15 | (3) |
| 2008 | La Equidad | 6 | (1) |
| 2008–2010 | Progreso | | |
| 2009 | → Deportivo Zacapa (loan) | | (2) |
| 2010–2011 | Montevideo Wanderers | 25 | (4) |
| 2011–2014 | Central Español | | |
| 2014–2016 | Villa Española | 25 | (5) |

International career^{‡}
| 2002 | Uruguay | 1 | (0) |
- * Club domestic league appearances and goals as of 8 January 2009 ‡ National team caps and goals as of 8 January 2009

Ronald Andrés Ramírez Villa (born 23 November 1976, in Montevideo) is a retired Uruguayan footballer.

== Club career ==
Ramírez had a spell with San Luis F.C. in the Primera Division de Mexico. He also played in Colombia for Independiente Santa Fe and La Equidad.

== International career ==
Ramírez made one appearance for the senior Uruguay national football team, a friendly against Venezuela on 20 November 2002.
