= Leonardo Novo =

Uruguayan footballer (born 1990)

Personal information
- Full name: Leonardo Rubén Novo Pérez
- Date of birth: 13 October 1990 (age 36)
- Place of birth: Montevideo, Uruguay
- Height: 1.68 m (5 ft 6 in)
- Position: Attacking midfielder

Team information
- Current team: Progreso

Senior career*
Years	Team	Apps	(Gls)
2009–2011	Nacional	0	(0)
2010–2011	→ El Tanque (loan)	18	(1)
2011–2012	Valladolid B		
2014	Albion		
2014–2016	Miramar Misiones	10	(2)
2016–	Progreso	11	(1)
- * Club domestic league appearances and goals as of 15 October 2016

Leonardo Rubén Novo Pérez (born 13 October 1990 in Montevideo) is an Uruguayan footballer who plays as an attacking midfielder for Progreso.
