= Richard Porta =

Australian soccer player (born 1983)

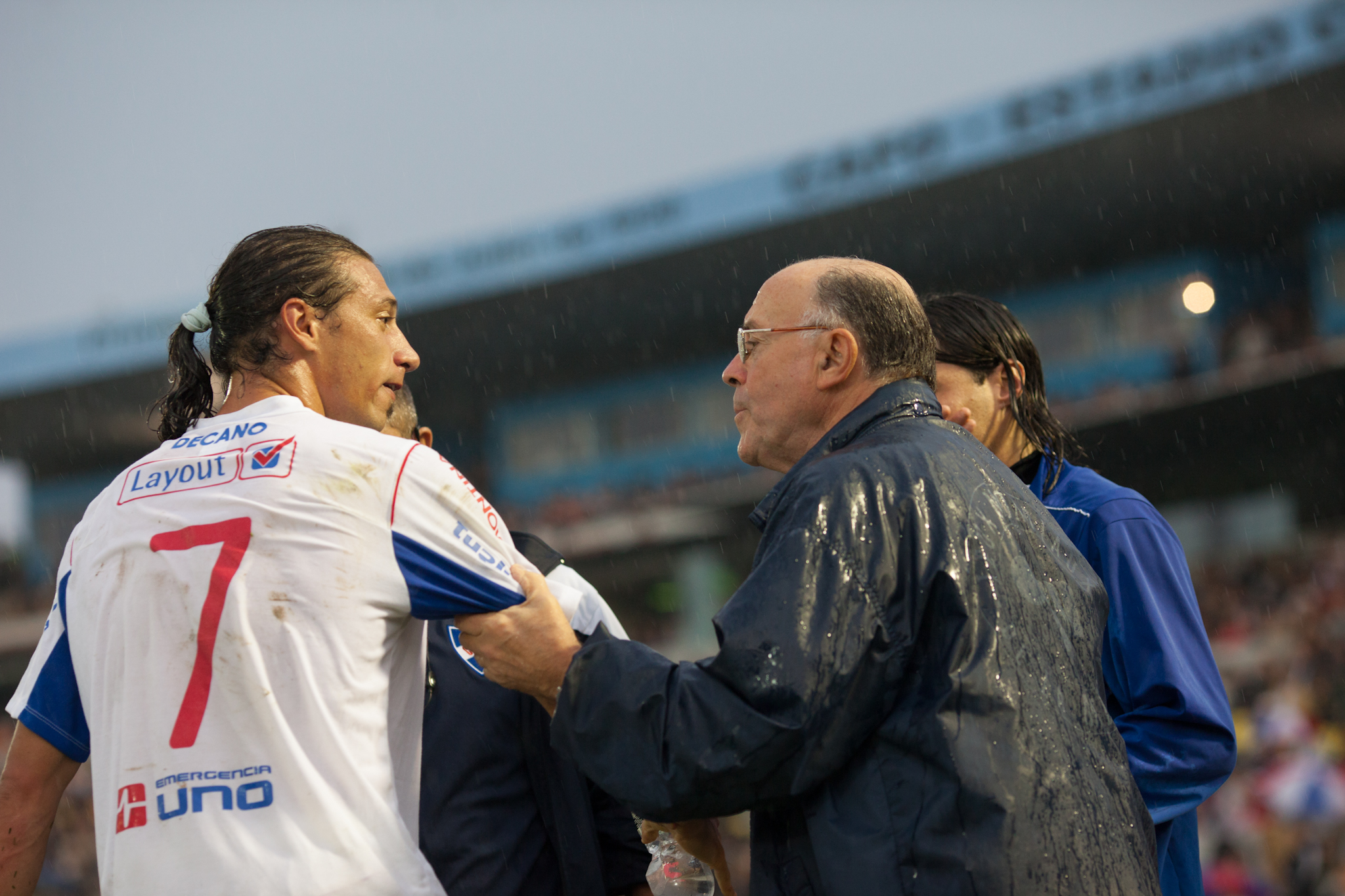
- Porta with Nacional

Personal information
- Full name: Richard Aníbal Porta Candelaresi
- Date of birth: 1 August 1983 (age 43)
- Place of birth: Fairfield, New South Wales, Australia
- Height: 1.84 m (6 ft 0 in)
- Position: Striker

Youth career
- River Plate

Senior career*
Years	Team	Apps	(Gls)
2001–2007	River Plate	78	(41)
2008–2011	Siena	1	(0)
2008–2009	→ Belenenses (loan)	11	(1)
2009–2010	→ River Plate (loan)	20	(3)
2010–2011	→ Nacional (loan)	19	(5)
2011–2012	Nacional	16	(17)
2011	→ Al Wasl (loan)	8	(1)
2012–2013	Dubai Club	21	(9)
2013–2014	Nacional	13	(4)
2014	Independiente del Valle	10	(2)
2015	Rentistas	12	(2)
2015–2016	Cerro	15	(5)
2016–2017	River Plate	25	(3)
2017	Cerro	10	(0)

International career
2003	Uruguay U20	3	(1)
- * Club domestic league appearances and goals

Richard Aníbal Porta Candelaresi (born 1 August 1983) is a former professional footballer who played as a striker. He is a two-time golden boot winner, having won the award whilst at River Plate and most recently at Nacional in Uruguay's Primera División. Born in Australia, he represented the Uruguay U20 national team at international level. His nickname is "El Canguro", which means "The Kangaroo" in Spanish.

== Early life ==
Porta was born at Fairfield Hospital in Sydney, New South Wales to Uruguayan parents. Porta subsequently lived in Australia before relocating to Uruguay at the age of 1. He spent his youth footballing career playing with River Plate.

== Club career ==
=== River Plate ===
Porta scored a record-breaking haul of 19 goals in 15 league appearances during the 2007–08 Primera División's Torneo Apertura. He was joint leading-goal scorer of the tournament along with Danubio's Christian Stuani, establishing a new domestic record which prompted Uruguayan agent Paco Casal to buy the rights of Porta's contract for $1.1 million. In January 2008 Porta was signed to Italian club A.C. Siena.

=== Siena ===
It was reported that Porta had signed a five-year contract with Siena for approximately €3 million. On 16 March 2008, Porta debuted for Siena in a 4–0 loss to Reggina Calcio when he was substituted onto the field for Tomas Locatelli on 62 minutes. The match proved to be his only appearance in the 2007–08 Serie A season.

=== Belenenses ===
In August 2008 Porta joined Clube de Futebol Os Belenenses for the 2008–09 Primeira Liga season. He debuted for the club on 21 September in a 2–0 loss to Sporting CP. Two weeks later Porta scored his first goal for the club in a 1–1 draw against Naval 1º de Maio on 5 October, Porta had been substituted onto the field on 87 minutes for Gabriel Enrique Gómez Girón and scored the equaliser for Belenenses on 90 minutes. Porta appeared in 11 games for Belenenses during the 2008–09 season, having scored just one goal, his last appearance was on 24 May in a 3–1 loss to Benfica. Porta made four appearances for Belenenses during the 2008–09 Taça de Portugal after losing to Naval 1º de Maio in the fourth round.

=== River Plate ===
In July 2009 Porta was loaned to former club River Plate de Montevideo where he replaced striker Henry Damián Giménez who left for Bologna. On 13 September Porta re-debuted for River Plate, scoring on 30 minutes in a 1–1 draw to Rampla Juniors. In September Porta played in River Plate's 2009 Copa Sudamericana clash with Brazil's Vitória as River Plate won 4–1 and drew 1–1 to advance to the next round. On 18 October he scored his second league goal after 15 minutes against Atenas in a 1–0 win. On 21 October River Plate faced San Lorenzo in the next round of the Copa Sudamericana as Porta played 87 minutes of the 1–0 loss. In the second-leg Porta would score for River Plate on 46 minutes which leveled the scores on aggregate. The match was decided by a penalty shootout which River Plate won 7–6 despite Porta failing to convert his spot kick. Progressing to the semi-final stage of the Copa Sudamericana, Porta put River Plate 1–0 in front after nine minutes against LDU Quito as his side claimed a 2–1 victory at the Estadio Centenario on 12 November. In the second-leg on 19 November River Plate would lose 7–0 to Quito in a game which Porta did not take part in. On 31 January Ported scored River Plate's second goal in a 3–3 draw to Central Español. On 25 February Porta received his first red card in a 3–0 win to Danubio when he was substituted on to the field on 59 minutes and was red carded in the same minute. River Plate finished the 2009–10 season in fifth spot with 23 points as Porta had scored 3 goals in 20 league matches.

=== Nacional ===
==== 2010–2011 season ====
In July 2010 Porta was loaned to Club Nacional de Football for the 2010–11 season where he made his debut on 30 August in a 3–0 loss against Fénix at Nacional's Estadio Gran Parque Central. On 12 February he scored his first goal for Nacional in a 2–1 loss to Fénix at the Estadio Centenario. On 16 February Porta debuted for Nacional at the 2011 Copa Libertadores in a 2–0 loss to Mexico's Club América when he was substituted onto the field on 46 minutes for Nicolás Vigneri. On 13 March in a 2–0 win against Liverpool Porta was substituted onto the field on 65 minutes for Jonathan Sebastián Charquero and scored Nacional's second goal one minute later. Three days later Porta was substituted onto the field for Maximiliano Calzada on 64 minutes in Nacional's 1–0 Copa Libertadores win against Argentinos Juniors. On 21 March Porta scored a double for Nacional as they beat Cerro 3–0. On 29 May Porta scored his last goal for Nacional in the 2010–11 season after five minutes in a 3–0 win against Defensor. Nacional finished in first place of the 2010–11 Torneo Clausura with 34 points, claiming a spot at the 2012 Copa Libertadores given that they had finish in third position in their respective 2011 Copa Libertadores group, behind Fluminense and Club América. Having scored 5 goals in 19 league appearances it was reported that at one stage during 2010 Porta was a recruiting target for Sydney FC.

==== 2011–2012 season ====
===== Loan to Al Wasl =====
After five games of the Torneo Apertura, in October 2011, Porta announced that he was joining Diego Maradona in his new club Al Wasl FC in Dubai, the United Arab Emirates. After three months in the Emirates, he returned to Nacional as his contract with Al Wasl was terminated.

Even though he missed many games while in Al Wasl, Porta ended the Campeonato Uruguayo as the highest scorer with 17 goals in 16 games, including two consecutive hattricks, against Cerrito and Bella Vista.

=== Dubai Club ===
On 11 July 2012, it was reported that Porta had rejected an offer in England in favour of a two-year multimillion-dollar contract with UAE Pro-League side Dubai Club.

=== Independiente del Valle ===
On 1 August 2014, Porta signed on to play with Ecuadorian Serie A club Independiente del Valle for the remainder of the season.

=== Rentistas ===
Upon his departure from Independiente del Valle, Porta signed with Uruguayan football club

== International career ==
In 1999 Porta was called up to a one-week training camp for the Australia U17 national team in Montevideo but was not selected for the squad that went on to claim silver medals at the 1999 FIFA U-17 World Cup in New Zealand. Porta then went on to represent the Uruguay U-20 squad at the 2003 South American Youth Championship held in Uruguay where he scored in Uruguay's 4–1 win against Bolivia on 13 January. During 2006 and 2007 Porta was twice drafted into a home-based squad for the Uruguay national team without being capped, first in March 2006 for a friendly against Saudi Arabia which was later suspended and then in September 2007 for a friendly against South Africa where he was an un-used substitute. On 21 December 2007, it was reported by The Age that Porta, despite not speaking English, had stated that if someone from Australia asked him then he would not rule out "wearing the green and gold" for the Australia national side under coach Pim Verbeek. By 16 January 2008 it was again reported by The Age that Pim Verbeek was poised to invite Porta to join the squad for Australia's 2010 FIFA World Cup qualifiers.

On 3 April 2011, it was reported that Porta, having been ignored by Australia's former coach Pim Verbeek, declared that he would consider playing for Australia should someone ask him first. Despite a chronic shortage of strikers leading up to the 2010 FIFA World Cup, it was reported that Verbeek became increasingly agitated whenever questioned about Porta's claims to represent the national side when Verbeek stated that Porta never officially contacted the FFA to express his interest in playing for Australia. However, Holger Osieck looked to have re-opened the door for Porta, to prepare for the 2014 FIFA World Cup qualifiers, as Osieck's staff began to monitor Porta's progress following his switch from River Plate to Nacional. Osieck considered inviting Porta to Australia's training camp in Germany during April. Having become disillusioned by his treatment from Verbeek, Porta regained enthusiasm to play for Australia as his brother, Gonzalo, who lives in Sydney stated that Porta knew Osieck was a more serious coach than Verbeek and that he definitely wanted to play for Australia hoping that his chance would come soon. On 7 November, Holger Osieck stated in an interview that the paperwork to officially enable Porta to play for Australia was underway and that clarification from The Uruguayan FA and FIFA was imminent. This should ensure El Canguro is eligible to play for the Socceroos despite the fact that he has played for the Uruguay U-20 team.

As of May 2017, Porta has yet to be capped by either the Uruguayan or Australian national teams.

According to the Sydney Morning Herald, Porta effectively cut ties with the Australian national team; this came after he was repeatedly stood up by the FFA, despite clearly voicing his interest in playing for Australia.

== Personal life ==
Although Porta and his parents moved back to Uruguay shortly after his birth, Porta's maternal grandparents, cousins and his brother still live in Sydney. Porta declared his allegiance to Australia during the decisive 2006 FIFA World Cup CONMEBOL – OFC qualification play-off between Australia and Uruguay when he appeared as a television studio guest in Montevideo wearing a green and gold shirt. Porta is nicknamed 'El Canguro', translating to 'Kangaroo' in Spanish. During his period in Siena he thought to take the Italian citizenship because his maternal grandfather is Italian. He achieved the fourth place on the first celebrity spin-off of MasterChef Uruguay, in 2020.

== Honours ==
Nacional

- Uruguayan Primera División: 2011 Torneo Clausura, 2010–11 Campeonato Uruguayo, 2011 Torneo Apertura, 2011–12 Campeonato Uruguayo

Individual

- Primera División Uruguaya Golden Boot: 2007 Torneo Apertura (19 goals), 2012 Torneo Clausura (14 goals), 2011–12 Campeonato Uruguayo (17 goals)
