= Mariano Pernía =

Spanish footballer (born 1977)

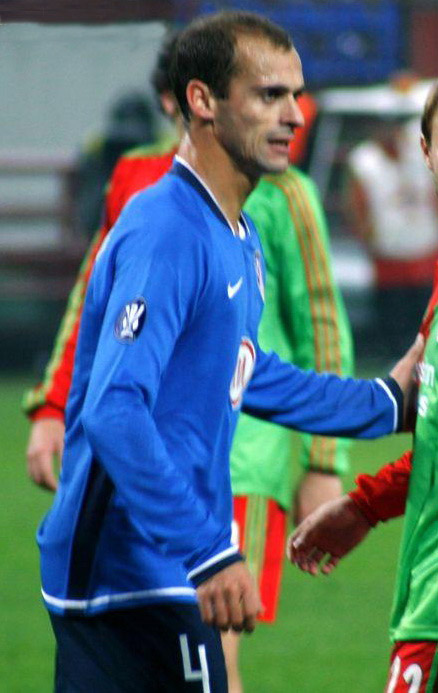
- Pernía playing for Atlético Madrid in 2007

Personal information
- Full name: Mariano Andrés Pernía Molina
- Date of birth: 4 May 1977 (age 49)
- Place of birth: Buenos Aires, Argentina
- Height: 1.77 m (5 ft 10 in)
- Position: Left back

Youth career
- San Lorenzo

Senior career*
Years	Team	Apps	(Gls)
1997–1999	San Lorenzo	0	(0)
1999–2002	Independiente	46	(2)
2003–2004	Recreativo	59	(3)
2004–2006	Getafe	72	(13)
2006–2010	Atlético Madrid	80	(1)
2010	Nacional	7	(0)
2011–2012	Tigre	9	(1)
Total		273	(20)

International career
2006–2007	Spain	11	(1)
- * Club domestic league appearances and goals

Mariano Andrés Pernía Molina (born 4 May 1977) is a retired footballer who played as a left back and current race car driver. Born in Argentina, he represented the Spain national team in the 2006 World Cup.

After starting professionally with Independiente, he moved to Spain in the early 2000s, going on to represent three teams in the country – most notably Getafe and Atlético Madrid, scoring ten La Liga goals in one sole season with the former – amassing Spanish top flight totals of 171 matches and 16 goals over seven seasons.

== Club career ==
Born in Buenos Aires, Argentina, Pernía came through the ranks at San Lorenzo de Almagro, but never achieved a first-team presence. He got his first chance of professional football when he moved to Club Atlético Independiente, but found himself moving in and out of the main squad; he made a total of 57 appearances for the club in all competitions, scoring two goals.

In January 2003, Pernía moved to La Liga with Recreativo de Huelva He started in the Copa del Rey final loss to RCD Mallorca, but the Andalusians were also relegated that season; he played 40 league matches during the following campaign's second division.

Although Pernía was 26 and yet to break into regular top flight football, he made the most of his opportunity when he moved to newly promoted Getafe CF in 2004. He made an immediate impact in the Madrid side as an attacking defender with a killer left foot, scoring three goals in his debut season including a 40-metre effort against Real Betis; he was a major part of an underrated team that survived their first season in the top division.

2005–06 saw Pernía start 35 out of 38 games for Getafe, and he amazingly finished the season with ten goals and two assists, becoming the highest scoring defender in a season for 20 years. With such good form, his future was the source of much speculation and, despite a bid from Valencia CF, he signed a four-year contract with Atlético Madrid in February 2006 starting in the following campaign, going on to battle with Antonio López for the left-back position– he was sent off in his final appearance for Getafe, a 0–1 away loss to RC Celta de Vigo.

During his first year with his new club, Pernía played second-fiddle to López under manager Javier Aguirre. Subsequently, at the season's end, speculation was rife that he would return to Getafe following the departure of former teammate Javier Paredes to Real Zaragoza, but he committed himself to Atlético.

However, in 2007–08, the tables turned, and Pernía gained positional battle with López, featuring in 29 league contests as the Colchoneros finished fourth, with the subsequent qualification to the UEFA Champions League. Throughout the following campaign he remained first-choice for most of the games, and also saw the birth of his own official fanclub – "Peña Pernía", which was Atlético's fastest growing peña of 2008. However, in early July 2009, he and his family were involved in a serious car accident, in the player's native Argentina. Both his daughter and nephew were unharmed, but he suffered a broken clavicle and minor lung injuries. He went on to fully recover, but the vehicle was practically and totally destroyed; his season consisted of only two appearances: against UD Marbella for the domestic cup, and in the league against Xerez CD (a 1–2 home loss).

Aged 33, Pernía was released by Atlético in July 2010, signing with Montevideo's Club Nacional de Football two months later. In the following transfer window, however, he returned to his nation of birth, joining Primera División's Club Atlético Tigre.

== International career ==
Pernía's excellent form throughout 2005–06 made him a contender for international selection with both Argentina and Spain. Although born in Argentina, he was granted Spanish citizenship in May 2006.

Initially, national team boss Luis Aragonés opted not to pick Pernía for Spain's team in the 2006 FIFA World Cup – his reasoning was entirely legal and explained under current FIFA rules on squad selection. Asier del Horno was supposed to be first-choice leftback for the competition, but an ankle injury sustained in the build-up to the tournament saw Pernía controversially called up as his last-minute replacement after a personal call from the coach. In the last friendly before the tournament in Germany he made his debut against Croatia, and scored from a free-kick on 7 June 2006 in a match played in Geneva.

Surprisingly, Pernía came from third-choice to starter, and appeared in the final stages in group wins against Ukraine and Tunisia, and also in their round-of-16 loss to France.

=== International goals ===
#	Date	Venue	Opponent	Score	Result	Competition
1.	7 June 2006	Stade de Genève, Geneva, Switzerland	Croatia	1–1	2–1	Friendly

== Motorsport career ==
After retiring from football, like his father and brother Leonel, Mariano began to compete in motorsports. He has competed mainly in Turismo Nacional but also in TC2000 and Super TC2000.

== Personal life ==
Pernía had football in his family. He was the son of a famous Argentine player, Vicente Pernía (who was ironically left controversially out of the Argentine squad for the 1978 FIFA World Cup), to whom he dedicated his World Cup call-up to.

Pernía's mother was Olga, and he also had four brothers and a sister: his eldest brother, Gastón, played for the Orlando Sharks in the Major Indoor Soccer League. Another brother, Leonel, played for the Chicago Storm in the same competition and also raced cars in his country, competing in the World Touring Car Championship; his great-grandparents were also Spanish.

Pernía's daughter was already born in Spain. He was on holiday in Tandil with his family upon getting the call from Aragonés, and subsequently had to delay his 20 June wedding in order to play in the World Cup. He said of the call-up:

"My wife's happy for me although a bit disappointed about having to postpone the wedding".

== Honours ==
Independiente

- Argentine Primera División: Apertura 2002

Recreativo

- Copa del Rey runner-up: 2002–03

Atlético Madrid

- UEFA Europa League: 2009–10
- UEFA Intertoto Cup: 2007
- Copa del Rey runner-up: 2009–10

== See also ==
- List of Spain international footballers born outside Spain
