= Tabaré Viudez =

Uruguayan footballer (born 1989)

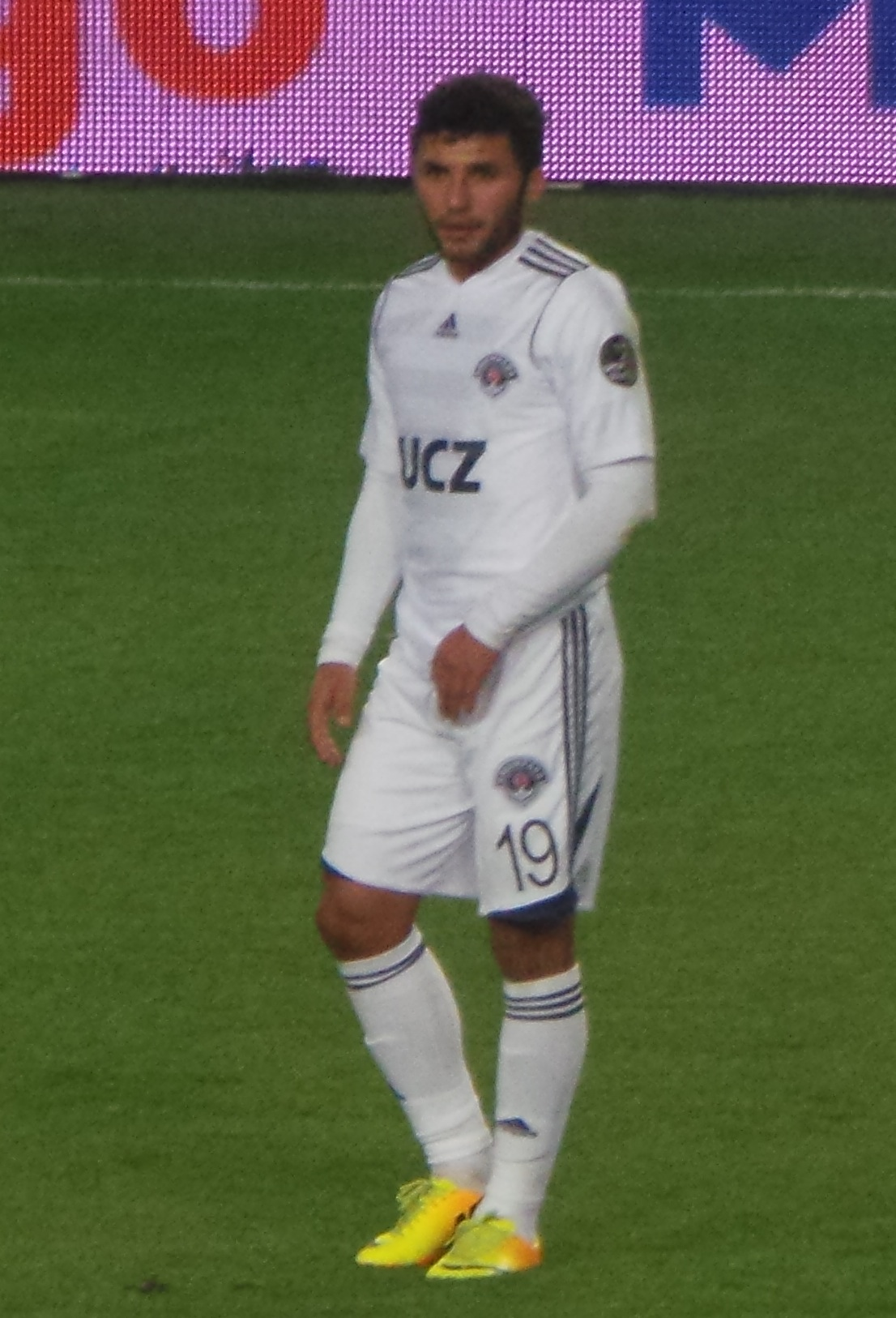
- Viudez with Kasımpaşa in 2014

Personal information
- Full name: Tabaré Uruguay Viudez Mora
- Date of birth: 8 September 1989 (age 37)
- Place of birth: Montevideo, Uruguay
- Height: 1.70 m (5 ft 7 in)
- Positions: Forward; attacking midfielder

Team information
- Current team: Wanderers
- Number: 10

Youth career
- 2005–2007: Defensor Sporting
- 2008–2009: Milan

Senior career*
Years	Team	Apps	(Gls)
2007–2008	Defensor Sporting	35	(6)
2008–2009	Milan	1	(0)
2009–2010	Defensor Sporting	13	(2)
2010–2012	América	0	(0)
2010	→ Necaxa (loan)	11	(0)
2011–2012	→ Nacional (loan)	38	(10)
2012–2015	Kasımpaşa	68	(11)
2015–2016	River Plate	16	(1)
2016–2018	Nacional	68	(8)
2019–2020	Olimpia	26	(4)
2020	Defensor Sporting	13	(1)
2021	Rentistas	20	(1)
2022–2023	Cerro	31	(2)
2023–	Wanderers	25	(3)

International career
2007–2009	Uruguay U20	14	(2)
2012	Uruguay Olympic	2	(0)
- * Club domestic league appearances and goals as of 18 July 2024

Tabaré Uruguay Viudez Mora (born 8 September 1989) is a Uruguayan footballer currently playing for Montevideo Wanderers.

== Career ==
=== Defensor Sporting ===
Viudez played for Defensor Sporting for the 2007–08 season and scored 6 goals.

=== Milan ===
In the 2008 off-season transfer window, Viudez attracted the attention of Milan along with Mathias Cardacio. Both players signed for the club after undergoing trials. Viudez was to wear the number '20' shirt, previously worn by Yoann Gourcuff. The Fonseca Group, who had the rights of the player, led the negotiations to transfer Viudez to the San Siro for the upcoming Serie A 2008–09 season. The Montevideo-born player, was relishing the new chapter in his career. 'I cannot believe it. It's a terrific jump up in my career,' he said. 'I must confess I have mixed feelings - nervousness and joy. This is a big step forward for me.' It was not known yet whether Viudez was to play for the first-team, play for Milan's Primavera squad (Under-20) or go out on loan for the season.

Viudez made several pre-season appearances for Milan. After coming on as a substitute at the half for Alberto Paloschi against Manchester City, Ancelotti praised his movement and pace after the match declaring him a player that can be relied on in the future, despite the narrow 1–0 loss. Viudez made his competitive debut in the Serie A coming on as a late substitute for David Beckham in a 3–0 win over Atalanta on 8 March 2009. This was also his only competitive match in Milan. And he was on the pitch for just 7 seconds before the final whistle, without touching the ball.

=== Return to Defensor Sporting ===
On 28 August 2009 Milan released Viudez and fellow Uruguayan Cardacio, by mutual consent. He was later signed by his former club Defensor Sporting.

=== América ===
On 19 April 2010, Viudez joined Mexican giants Club América, signing a four-year contract.

==== Loans to Necaxa and Nacional ====
On 8 June 2010 he was loaned Necaxa.

In December 2010, Viudez signed for Club Nacional de Football for the 2010-11 Torneo Clausura. After Nacional won the Clausura, Viudez scored the only goal in the season's final game against Defensor Sporting. He was also a key player for Nacional to win the next season's championship.

=== Kasımpaşa ===
On 9 August 2012, Viudez joined Turkish side Kasımpaşa, signing a three-year contract, with an optional two-years.

=== Club Atlético River Plate ===
On 2 July 2015, Viudez was presented as a new River Plate player. His first appearance was on 21 July 2015, in the semifinals of 2015 Copa Libertadores against Guaraní. He came in as a sub in the second half, where he provided an assists to Lucas Alario's equalizer. The 1–1 final score helped River Plate advance to the final. In the first leg of the final against Tigres UANL, he was injured and missed the second leg. River Plate beat Tigres 3–0 in the second leg of the final, to win their third Copa Libertadores.

He scored his first goal against Colón, in the first matchday of the 2015 Argentine Primera División. The game ended in a 3–1 victory.

=== Nacional ===
On 26 July 2016, Viudez re-joined Nacional, after struggling to settle down in Argentina.

=== Olimpia ===
On 14 December 2018, Viudez joined Paraguayan club Olimpia, signing a three-year contract. In his first season, he helped his club win the Apertura of the 2019 Paraguayan Primera División. In the following tournament, he and his club were crowned champions, making it four-straight championships for Olimpia. On 16 September 2020, after suffering a string of injuries, including an elbow dislocation, his contract was rescinded by Olimpia.

=== Defensor Sporting ===
On 30 September 2020, it was announced that Viudez was returning to Defensor Sporting for a third stint, signing a contract until December 2021. At the end of the 2020 season, his team was relegated for the first time in 56 years.

=== Rentistas ===
On 16 April 2021, Viudez joined Rentistas on a free transfer, after rescinding his contract with Defensor Sporting.

=== Cerro ===
On 9 February 2022, Viudez joined Cerro in the Uruguayan Segunda División.

=== Wanderers ===
On 10 August 2023, Viudez joined Montevideo Wanderers.

== International career ==
Viudez was part of Uruguay's 2007 FIFA U-20 World Cup squad and was the youngest player representing them. In January 2009, Viudez joined up with Uruguay's 2009 South American Youth Championship in Venezuela. He played the first match in Uruguay's 2–0 victory over Bolivia and provided an impressive assist for the first goal to Nicolás Lodeiro. In the side's second match, Viudez scored a goal in the first minute in the side's 3–2 victory over Chile. He was part of Uruguay's team at the 2012 Summer Olympics.

== Career statistics ==
As of 18 July 2024

Appearances and goals by club, season and competition
Club	Season	League			Cup		Continental (Note: Appearances in Copa Libertadores and Copa Sudamericana)		Total	
Club	Season	Division	Apps	Goals	Apps	Goals	Apps	Goals	Apps	Goals
Defensor Sporting	2007–08	Uruguayan Primera División	35	6	—		—		35	6
Milan	2008–09	Italian Serie A	1	0	—		—		1	0
Defensor Sporting	2009–10	Uruguayan Primera División	13	2	—		—		13	2
Necaxa (loan)	2010–11	Mexican Primera División	11	0	—		—		11	0
Nacional (loan)	2010–11	Uruguayan Primera División	12	4	—		6	0	18	4
Nacional (loan)	2011–12	Uruguayan Primera División	26	6	—		7	2	33	8
Nacional (loan)	Total		28	10	—		13	2	51	12
Kasımpaşa	2012–13	Turkish Süper Lig	23	5	3	1	—		26	6
Kasımpaşa	2013–14	Turkish Süper Lig	30	5	1	1	—		31	6
Kasımpaşa	2014–15	Turkish Süper Lig	15	1	1	0	—		16	1
Kasımpaşa	Total		68	11	5	2	—		73	13
River Plate	2015	Argentine Primera División	11	1	—		7	0	18	1
River Plate	2016	Argentine Primera División	5	0	—		2	0	7	0
River Plate	Total		16	1	—		9	0	25	1
Nacional	2016	Uruguayan Primera División	13	1	—		—		13	1
Nacional	2017	Uruguayan Primera División	30	3	—		7	1	37	4
Nacional	2018	Uruguayan Primera División	25	4	1 (Note: Appearance in Supercopa Uruguaya)	1	15	0	41	5
Nacional	Total		68	8	1	1	22	1	91	10
Olimpia	2019	Paraguayan Primera División	22	4	—		7	0	29	4
Olimpia	2020	Paraguayan Primera División	4	0	—		—		4	0
Olimpia	Total		26	4	—		7	0	33	4
Defensor Sporting	2020	Uruguayan Primera División	13	1	—		—		13	1
Rentistas	2021	Uruguayan Primera División	20	1	—		2	0	22	1
Cerro	2022	Uruguayan Segunda División	17	2	—		—		17	2
Cerro	2023	Uruguayan Primera División	14	0	—		—		14	0
Cerro	Total		31	2	—		—		31	2
Wanderers	2023	Uruguayan Primera División	10	2	—		—		10	2
Wanderers	2024	Uruguayan Primera División	15	1	—		1	0	16	1
Wanderers	Total		25	3	—		1	0	26	3
Career total			365	49	6	3	54	4	425	56

== Honours ==
Defensor Sporting

- Uruguayan League: 2007–08

Nacional

- Uruguayan League: 2010-11, 2011-12

River Plate

- Copa Suruga Bank: 2015
- Copa Libertadores: 2015
- FIFA Club World Cup runner-up: 2015

Olimpia

- Paraguayan League: 2019 Apertura, 2019 Clausura, 2020 Clausura
