= Gabriel Marques (footballer) =

Brazilian footballer (born 1988)

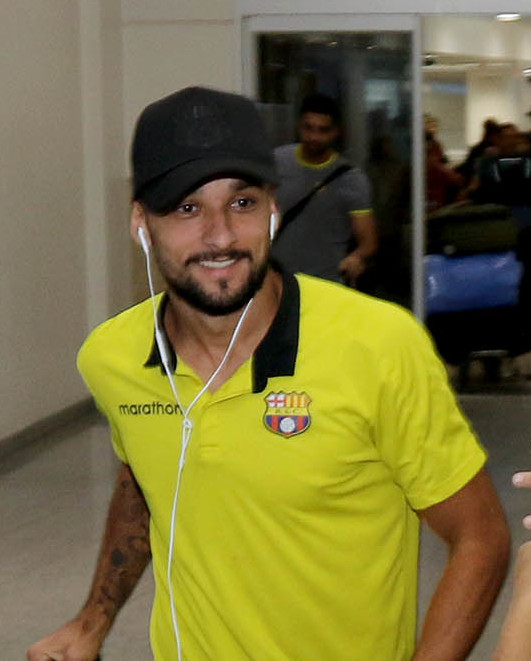

Personal information
- Full name: Gabriel Marques de Andrade Pinto
- Date of birth: 4 March 1988 (age 38)
- Place of birth: Pedro Leopoldo, Brazil
- Height: 1.84 m (6 ft 0 in)
- Position: Defensive midfielder

Youth career
- Grêmio

Senior career*
Years	Team	Apps	(Gls)
2007–2008	Grêmio	10	(0)
2009–2017	River Plate Montevideo	100	(3)
2011	→ Nacional (loan)	20	(0)
2012	→ Atlético Paranaense (loan)	20	(1)
2013	→ Paraná (loan)	13	(0)
2015–2017	→ Barcelona SC (loan)	97	(2)
2017–2021	Barcelona SC	111	(2)
2022	Guayaquil City	21	(0)
- * Club domestic league appearances and goals

Gabriel Marques de Andrade Pinto (born 4 March 1988), commonly known as Gabriel Marques, is a Brazilian former footballer who played as a defensive midfielder.

== Honours ==
Nacional

- Uruguayan Primera División: 2010–11

Barcelona SC

- Serie A (1): 2020
