= Simón Darío Ramírez =

Venezuelan poet

Simón Darío Ramírez (1930–1992) was a Venezuelan poet.

== Publications ==
- Furrows of the first planting, 1965.
- The walls ashen, 1966.
- Ceremonies for a day, 1966.
- About the sky Lespugue, 1968.
- Dawn was then, 1969.
- The game space, 1969.
- Caribay, 1970.
- Mirror on fire, 1972.
- Manuscript Fragments of a king without attributes, 1974.
- Stone head and Sleep, 1975
- Assumption of the elements, 1976.
- The iris of oblivion, 1983.
- The scars of the house, 1983.
- Letter deck, 1984.
- Hallucinations, 1987
