= 2007–08 in Uruguayan football =

== First Division ==
- Champion: Defensor Sporting (4th title)
- Top scorer: Richard Porta and Cristhian Stuani (19 goals each)
- International qualifiers:
  - Copa Libertadores: Defensor Sporting, Nacional and Peñarol
  - Copa Sudamericana: Defensor Sporting and River Plate
- Highest scoring: Danubio 9–1 Progreso (December 9, 2007)
- Relegated: Fénix, Miramar Misiones, and Progreso

== International tournaments ==
=== Copa Sudamericana 2007 ===
- Danubio - 1st round (eliminated by Tacuary).
- Defensor Sporting - quarter-finals (eliminated by River Plate).

=== Copa Libertadores 2008 ===
Starting from Group stage

- Danubio - 1st round (eliminated by Estudiantes and Lanús).
- Nacional - 2nd round (eliminated by São Paulo).

Starting from Pre-eliminary round

- Wanderers - Pre-eliminary round (eliminated by Cienciano)

== Second Division ==
=== Teams ===
These are the teams that currently participates in Uruguayan Second Division:

- Atenas
- Basañez
- Boston River
- Cerrito
- Cerro Largo
- Deportivo Maldonado
- Durazno FC
- El Tanque Sisley
- Huracán Buceo

- La Luz Tacurú FC
- Platense (withdraw)
- Plaza Colonia
- Racing
- Rentistas
- Rocha FC
- IASA
- Uruguay Montevideo (withdraw)
- Villa Española

=== Teams promoted to 2008/2009 First Division ===
- Racing (champion)
- Cerro Largo FC (won promotion playoff against Cerrito)
- Villa Española (won promotion playoff against El Tanque Sisley)

== Uruguay national teams ==
This section will cover Uruguay's games from the end of the Copa América 2007 until the June 30, 2008.

=== Friendly matches ===
12 September 2007	South Africa	0 – 0	Uruguay	Ellis Park Stadium, Johannesburg, South Africa
17:00 (SAST)		Report		Attendance: 60,000; Referee: Jean Pierre Pwanya (South Africa)

6 February 2008	Uruguay	2 – 2	Colombia	Estadio Centenario, Montevideo, Uruguay
20:30 (UTC-3)	Cavani 78'; Suárez 83'	Report	A. Perea 23', 73'	Attendance: 30,000; Referee: Liber Prudente (Uruguay)

25 May 2008	Turkey	2 – 3	Uruguay	RewirpowerSTADION, Bochum, Germany
19:30 (UTC+1)	Turan 13'; Kahveci 50'	Report	Suárez 31' (pen.), 77'; C. Rodríguez 84' (pen.)	Attendance: 20,000; Referee: Florian Mayer (Germany)

28 May 2008	Norway	2 – 2	Uruguay	Ullevaal Stadium, Oslo, Norway
19:05 (UTC+1)	Elyounoussi 49'; J. A. Riise 84'	Report	Suárez 43'; Eguren 68'	Attendance: 20,000; Referee: Anthony Buttimer (Ireland)

=== 2010 World Cup qualifiers ===
13 October 2007 Round 1	Uruguay	5 – 0	Bolivia	Estadio Centenario, Montevideo, Uruguay
16:30 (UTC-2)	Suárez 4'; Forlán 38'; Abreu 48'; Sánchez 67'; Bueno 82'; M. Pereira (yellow card) 84'	Report	García (yellow card) 35' (yellow-red card) 41'; Raldes (yellow card) 37'	Attendance: 25,200; Referee: Rubén Selman (Chile)

17 October 2007 Round 2	Paraguay	1 – 0	Uruguay	Estadio Defensores del Chaco, Asunción, Paraguay
18:10 (UTC-4)	Valdez 15', (yellow card) 53'; Riveros (yellow card) 32'; Cardozo (yellow card) 83'	Report	García (yellow card) 46'; Pérez (yellow card) 50'; Amador (yellow card) 85'	Attendance: 23,200; Referee: Héctor Baldassi (Argentina)

18 November 2007 Round 3	Uruguay	2 – 2	Chile	Estadio Centenario, Montevideo, Uruguay
17:00 (UTC-2)	C. Rodríguez (yellow card) 10'; Scotti (yellow card) 29'; Suárez 41'; Gargano (yellow card) 64'; Lugano (yellow card) 68'; Abreu 81'	Report	Suazo (yellow card) 19'; Rubio (yellow card) 33'; Salas 49', 59' (pen.); Ponce (yellow card) 75'; Vidal (yellow card) 90+3'	Attendance: 35,000; Referee: Sergio Pezzotta (Argentina)

21 November 2007 Round 4	Brazil	2 – 1	Uruguay	Estádio Cícero Pompeu de Toledo, São Paulo, Brazil
21:45 (UTC-2)	Luís Fabiano 44', 64'	Report	Abreu 8'; Suárez (yellow card) 23'; Fucile (yellow card) 27'; A. González (yellow card) 66'; C. Rodríguez (yellow card) 87'	Attendance: 70,000; Referee: Héctor Baldassi (Argentina)

14 June 2008 Round 5	Uruguay	1 – 1	Venezuela	Estadio Centenario, Montevideo, Uruguay
16:00 (UTC-3)	Lugano 12'	Report	Vargas 56'	Attendance: 41,831; Referee: Alfredo Intriago (Ecuador)

18 June 2008 Round 6	Uruguay	6 – 0	Peru	Estadio Centenario, Montevideo, Uruguay
19:00 (UTC-3)	Forlán 8', 37' (pen.), 53'; Godín (yellow card) 19'; Bueno 61', 69'; Abreu 90'	Report	Marino (yellow card) 7'; Guerrero (yellow card) 27' (red card) 37'; Villalta (yellow card) 67'; Cevasco (yellow card) 80'	Attendance: 20,016; Referee: Pablo Pozo (Chile)

Win Draw Loss

Preceded by 2006-07	Seasons in Uruguayan football 2007–2008	Succeeded by 2008-09
