= Edison Torres =

Paraguayan footballer (born 1983)

Edison Eliazer Torres Martínez (born 4 April 1983) is a Paraguayan former professional footballer who played as a midfielder.

== Teams ==
- (Argentina) Racing Club 2001–2004
- (Paraguay) Guaraní 2004–2005
- (Paraguay) Universal 2006
- (Uruguay) Tacuarembó 2007
- (Colombia) Deportivo Pereira 2008
- (Uruguay) Atenas de San Carlos 2009–2010
- (Uruguay) Montevideo Wanderers 2010
- (Uruguay) Peñarol 2011
- (Uruguay) Liverpool de Montevideo 2012–2013
- (Paraguay) Cerro Porteño 2013–2014
- (Argentina) Talleres de Córdoba 2014–present
- (Argentina) Talleres de Córdoba 2014
- (Uruguay) Juventud de Las Piedras 2014–2025
- (Paraguay) Deportivo Santaní 2015
