= Flavio Córdoba =

Colombian footballer (born 1984)

Personal information
- Full name: Flavio Armando Córdoba Rodríguez
- Date of birth: October 4, 1984 (age 42)
- Place of birth: Bogotá, Colombia
- Height: 1.87 m (6 ft 2 in)
- Position: Centre back

Team information
- Current team: La Equidad

Senior career*
Years	Team	Apps	(Gls)
2004–2005	Huracán Buceo		
2005–2011	River Plate	126	(7)
2008	→ Cúcuta Deportivo (loan)	?	(1)
2011	Nacional	3	(0)
2011	Millonarios	2	(0)
2012	La Equidad	43	(3)
2012–2016	River Plate	?	(?)
2016–	La Equidad	?	(?)
- * Club domestic league appearances and goals as of 06 July 2013

Flavio Armando Córdoba Rodríguez (born 4 October 1984) is a Colombian footballer who currently plays as a defender for La Equidad.

== Career ==
Since 2005 until 2007, Córdoba has played for River, in the Uruguayan First Division. During 2008 he was playing for Cúcuta Deportivo.

In January 2011 he signed for Club Nacional de Football.

In July 2011, Córdoba was loaned to Colombian giants Millonarios FC.

== Honours ==
Nacional

- Uruguayan Primera División: 2010–11

Millonarios

- Copa Colombia: 2011
