= Mariano Rubbo =

Uruguayan footballer (born 1988)

Personal information
- Full name: Mariano Rubbo Ferrari
- Date of birth: May 28, 1988 (age 38)
- Place of birth: Montevideo, Uruguay
- Height: 1.77 m (5 ft 10 in)
- Position: Midfielder

Senior career*
| Years | Team | Apps | (Gls) |
| 2008–2009 | Defensor Sporting | 12 | (0) |
| 2010 | Tacuarembó | 26 | (2) |
| 2011 | Miramar Misiones | | |
| 2011 | Criciúma | 2 | (0) |
| 2011 | Paysandú | | |
| 2012 | Colmenar Viejo | | |
| 2013 | Wanderers de Santa Lucía | | |
- * Club domestic league appearances and goals

Mariano Rubbo Ferrari was born May 28, 1988, in Montevideo, and is an Uruguayan footballer currently playing for Colmenar Viejo in Spain.

== Teams ==
- (Uruguay) Defensor Sporting 2008-2009
- (Uruguay) Tacuarembó 2010
- (Uruguay) Miramar Misiones 2011
- (Brazil) Criciuma 2011
- (Brazil) Paysandú 2011
- (Spain) Colmenar Viejo 2012
- (Uruguay) Wanderers de Santa Lucía 2013–present
