= Simón Ramírez (footballer, born 1985) =

Argentine footballer (born 1985)

Personal information
- Full name: Simón Rodrigo Ramírez
- Date of birth: 12 April 1985 (age 41)
- Place of birth: Morón, Argentina
- Height: 1.81 m (5 ft 11 in)
- Position: Midfielder

Youth career
- Argentinos Juniors

Senior career*
| Years | Team | Apps | (Gls) |
| 2004–2007 | Argentinos Juniors | 3 | (0) |
| 2006–2007 | → El Porvenir (loan) | 13 | (0) |
| 2007–2009 | All Boys | 28 | (1) |
| 2009 | Cobreloa | 9 | (8) |
| 2010–2011 | Deportivo Merlo | 6 | (0) |
| 2012 | Camioneros | – | (–) |
| 2012–2015 | JJ Urquiza | 65 | (11) |
- * Club domestic league appearances and goals

Simón Rodrigo Ramírez (born April 12, 1985, in Morón, Argentina) is an Argentine former footballer who played as a midfielder

== Teams ==
- (Argentina) Argentinos Juniors 2004–2006
- (Argentina) El Porvenir 2006–2007
- (Argentina) All Boys 2007–2009
- (Chile) Cobreloa 2009
- (Argentina) Deportivo Merlo 2010–2011
- (Argentina) Camioneros 2012
- (Argentina) JJ Urquiza 2012–2015

== Titles ==
- (Argentina) All Boys 2007-2008 (Primera B Metropolitana)
