= Sergio Souza =

Uruguayan footballer (born 1985)

Personal information
- Full name: Sergio Sebastián Souza Pisano
- Date of birth: 7 May 1985 (age 41)
- Place of birth: Montevideo, Uruguay
- Height: 1.64 m (5 ft 5 in)
- Positions: Attacking midfielder; forward

Youth career
- River Plate

Senior career*
Years	Team	Apps	(Gls)
2007–2011	River Plate	43	(15)
2010	→ Montevideo Wanderers (loan)	8	(1)
2011	→ Central Español (loan)	12	(2)
2011–2012	Central Español	23	(13)
2012	Olmedo	21	(5)
2013	Central Español	5	(2)
2013	Técnico Universitario		
2016–2017	Santa Tecla		
- * Club domestic league appearances and goals

Sergio Sebastián Souza Pisano (born 7 May 1985), is a Uruguayan former professional footballer who played as an attacking midfielder or forward.

== Career ==
Souza was born in Montevideo. On 26 June 2012, he was transferred to Ecuadorian side Centro Deportivo Olmedo.

== Honours ==
Central Español

- Uruguayan Segunda División: 2011–12
