= Julián Perujo =

Uruguayan footballer (born 1985)

Personal information
- Full name: Julián Ricardo Perujo Airala
- Date of birth: 18 April 1985 (age 41)
- Place of birth: Montevideo, Uruguay
- Position: Defender

Senior career*
Years	Team	Apps	(Gls)
-2010	Rampla Juniors	28+	(11+)
2010/2011	Club Nacional de Football	6	(0)
2011/2012	Defensor Sporting	12	(0)
2011/2012	Rampla Juniors	12	(0)
2012-2013	Boca Unidos	7	(0)
2013-2014	Club Atlético Atlanta	44	(1)
2014/15-2017	Sud América	81	(0)
2018	Central Español	11	(1)
2018-2019	Racing Club de Montevideo	5	(1)
2019-	Club Sportivo Cerrito	26	(5)
- * Club domestic league appearances and goals

Julián Ricardo Perujo Airala (born 18 April 1985 in Uruguay) is a Uruguayan footballer.

== Career ==
While playing for Sud América against Montevideo Wanderers, Perujo was sent off for kicking Cristian Palacios. However, he later received a seven-game suspension for a headbutt that never happened.
