= Leonardo Burián =

Uruguayan footballer (born 1984)

Personal information
- Full name: Leonardo Fabian Burián Castro
- Date of birth: 21 January 1984 (age 42)
- Place of birth: Montevideo, Uruguay
- Height: 1.88 m (6 ft 2 in)
- Position: Goalkeeper

Team information
- Current team: Cooper
- Number: 1

Youth career
- 1998–2005: Nacional

Senior career*
Years	Team	Apps	(Gls)
2005–2015	Nacional Montevideo	94	(0)
2006–2007	→ Bella Vista (loan)	30	(0)
2014	→ Juventud Las Piedras (loan)	7	(0)
2014	→ Deportes Tolima (loan)	24	(0)
2015–2017	Montevideo Wanderers	57	(0)
2017	Chiapas	0	(0)
2017–2018	Godoy Cruz	27	(0)
2018–2022	Colón	113	(0)
2022–2023	Vélez Sarsfield	33	(0)
2024–	Cooper	4	(0)

International career
2001	Uruguay U-17	8	(0)
- * Club domestic league appearances and goals as of 15 September 2024

Leonardo Fabián Burián Castro (born 21 January 1984) is a Uruguayan professional footballer who plays as a goalkeeper for Uruguayan Segunda División side Cooper. He was born in Montevideo.
