= Sergio Aquino (footballer) =

Paraguayan footballer (born 1979)

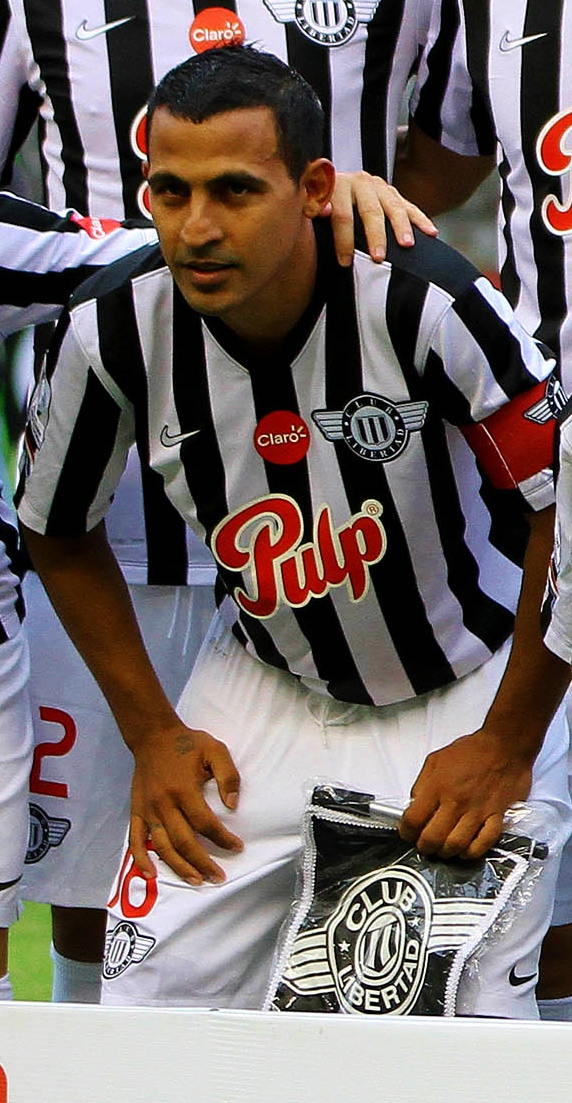

Personal information
- Full name: Sergio Daniel Aquino
- Date of birth: 21 September 1979 (age 47)
- Place of birth: Clorinda, Argentina
- Height: 1.74 m (5 ft 8 1/2 in)
- Position: Midfielder

Senior career*
Years	Team	Apps	(Gls)
1999–2004	Cerro Porteño	122	(7)
2005	Olimpia Asunción	30	(2)
2006–2020	Libertad	438	(22)
Total		590	(31)

International career
2008–2013	Paraguay	16	(0)

Managerial career
- 2023–2024: Libertad (assistant)
- 2024: Libertad (interim)
- 2025: Libertad
- * Club domestic league appearances and goals

Sergio Daniel Aquino (born 21 September 1979) is a football manager and former player who played as a midfielder. He was recently the manager of Paraguayan club Libertad.

Born in Argentina, Aquino played the entirety of his career in Paraguay, representing Cerro Porteño, Olimpia and Libertad, aside from playing for the Paraguay national team between 2008 and 2013.

== Managerial statistics ==
As of 28 August 2025

Managerial record by team and tenure
Team	Nat	From	To	Record							
Team	Nat	From	To	G	W	D	L	GF	GA	GD	Win %
Libertad	(Paraguay)	5 November 2024	28 August 2025	47	23	17	7	68	33	+35	48.94
Total				47	23	17	7	68	33	+35	48.94

== See also ==
- Players and Records in Paraguayan Football
