= Horacio Peralta =

Uruguayan footballer (born 1982)

Personal information
- Full name: Walter Horacio Peralta Saracho
- Date of birth: 3 June 1982 (age 44)
- Place of birth: Montevideo, Uruguay
- Height: 1.74 m (5 ft 9 in)
- Position: Striker

Youth career
- 1999: Santa Fe

Senior career*
Years	Team	Apps	(Gls)
1999–2000	Danubio	4	(0)
2001–2002	Cerro	19	(2)
2002–2004	Nacional	63	(15)
2004	Cagliari	1	(0)
2005	Albacete	12	(0)
2005	Grasshoppers	1	(0)
2006	Flamengo	8	(2)
2007	Bella Vista	5	(0)
2007	→ Académica (Loan)	1	(0)
2008	Quilmes	4	(0)
2008–2009	Puebla	14	(3)
2009	Atlante	6	(0)
2009–2010	Central Español	7	(1)
2010–2012	Nacional	21	(2)
2012	Cerro Largo	3	(0)
2013	Patriotas	5	(0)
2014–2015	Cerro	7	(1)
2015	Cerrito	8	(0)
2016–2017	Deportivo Maldonado	0	(0)

International career
1999–2003	Uruguay	7	(0)

Managerial career
- 2019–2021: Tristán Suárez (assistant)
- 2022–2023: Nacional Montevideo (youth)
- 2023: Salus
- 2024–2025: Miramar Misiones (assistant)
- 2024: Miramar Misiones (interim)
- 2025: Miramar Misiones
- * Club domestic league appearances and goals

Walter Horacio Peralta Saracho (born 3 June 1982) is a Uruguayan football manager and former player who played as a striker.

== Career ==
After beginning his professional football career with local side Danubio F.C., Peralta has had a journeyman's career, having appeared for 17 clubs in Uruguay and abroad by the time he signed with Club Sportivo Cerrito in 2015.

== Honours ==
Nacional

- Uruguayan Primera División: 2002

Flamengo

- Copa do Brasil: 2006
