= Diego Rodríguez (footballer, born 1988) =

Uruguayan footballer

Personal information
- Full name: Diego Sebastián Rodríguez Cano
- Date of birth: 28 May 1988
- Place of birth: Montevideo, Uruguay
- Date of death: 11 September 2010 (aged 22)
- Place of death: Montevideo, Uruguay
- Height: 1.80 m (5 ft 11 in)
- Position: Defender

Youth career
- Nacional

Senior career*
Years	Team	Apps	(Gls)
2008–2009	Nacional	0	(0)
2009–2010	Central Español	27	(8)
2010	Nacional	3	(0)
Total		30	(8)
- * Club domestic league appearances and goals

Diego Sebastián Rodríguez Cano (28 May 1988 – 11 September 2010) was a Uruguayan professional footballer who played as a defender.

== Career ==
Born in Montevideo, Rodríguez played for Nacional and Central Español.

== Death ==
Rodríguez was seriously injured in a car crash in Montevideo on 9 September 2010, and was admitted to the ICU at Montevideo's La Española hospital. He had suffered brain and chest trauma as a result of the accident, and died two days later of cardiac arrest at the age of 22. Following Rodríguez' death, tributes came in from Uruguayan football players: national team players Luis Suárez and Diego Forlán both dedicated their goals scored on Saturday to the memory of Rodríguez, as did Mario Regueiro, Luis Aguiar, Edinson Cavani and Sebastián "El Loco" Abreu. Forlán also commented the death on his Twitter account, offering his "condolences to Rodríguez' family, friends, fans of Nacional, and to football in Uruguay".

His remains are buried at Parque del Reencuentro.
