= Gabriel Alcoba =

Uruguayan footballer (born 1980)

Personal information
- Full name: Aníbal Gabriel Alcoba Rebollo
- Date of birth: 24 January 1980 (age 46)
- Place of birth: Paso de los Toros, Uruguay
- Height: 1.78 m (5 ft 10 in)
- Position: Midfielder

Team information
- Current team: Deportivo Maldonado
- Number: 14

Senior career*
Years	Team	Apps	(Gls)
2000–2001	Ituzaingó		
2002–2006	Montevideo Wanderers	102	(6)
2007	Deportivo Quito	13	(1)
2008	Danubio	5	(0)
2009	Cerrito	16	(0)
2010–2011	Central Español	26	(2)
2011–2013	Atenas	46	(10)
2013–	Deportivo Maldonado		

International career^{‡}
2005	Uruguay	1	(0)
- * Club domestic league appearances and goals as of 10 January 2009 ‡ National team caps and goals as of 10 January 2009

Aníbal Gabriel Alcoba Rebollo (born 24 January 1980 in Paso de los Toros) is a Uruguayan footballer who plays for Deportivo Maldonado in the Uruguayan Segunda División.

== International career ==
Alcoba has made one appearance for the senior Uruguay national football team, a friendly against Mexico on 26 October 2005.
