= Matías Cabrera =

Uruguayan footballer (born 1986)

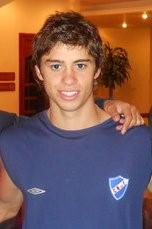
- Cabrera with Nacional in 2010

Personal information
- Full name: Matías Julio Cabrera Acevedo
- Date of birth: 16 May 1986 (age 40)
- Place of birth: Montevideo, Uruguay
- Height: 1.76 m (5 ft 9 in)
- Position: Midfielder

Senior career*
| Years | Team | Apps | (Gls) |
| 2005–2006 | El Tanque Sisley | 7 | (2) |
| 2006–2009 | Cerro | 51 | (3) |
| 2009–2012 | Nacional | 73 | (6) |
| 2013–2014 | Cagliari | 26 | (1) |
| 2014–2015 | Estoril | 20 | (0) |
| 2015–2016 | Nacional | 7 | (0) |
| 2016–2018 | Defensor Sporting | 69 | (13) |
| 2018–2019 | Deportivo Cali | 42 | (2) |
| 2020–2021 | Universidad de Concepción | 25 | (2) |
| 2021 | Defensor Sporting | 15 | (1) |
| 2022–2023 | Cerro | 32 | (0) |
- * Club domestic league appearances and goals

Matías Julio Cabrera Acevedo (born 16 May 1986) is a Uruguayan former professional footballer who played as a midfielder.

== Teams ==
- (Uruguay) El Tanque Sisley 2005–2006
- (Uruguay) Cerro 2006–2009
- (Uruguay) Nacional 2009–2012
- (Italy) Cagliari 2013–2014
- (Portugal) Estoril 2014–2015
- (Uruguay) Nacional 2015–2016
- (Uruguay) Defensor Sporting 2016–2018
- (Colombia) Deportivo Cali 2018–2019
- (Chile) Universidad de Concepción 2020–2021
- (Uruguay) Defensor Sporting 2021
- (Uruguay) Cerro 2022–2023

== Personal life ==
Cabrera is the nephew of Eduardo Acevedo.

== Honours ==
Cerro

- Liguilla Pre-Libertadores: 2009

Nacional

- Primera División Uruguaya : 2010–11, 2011–12
