= Santiago García (Uruguayan footballer) =

Uruguayan footballer (1990–2021)

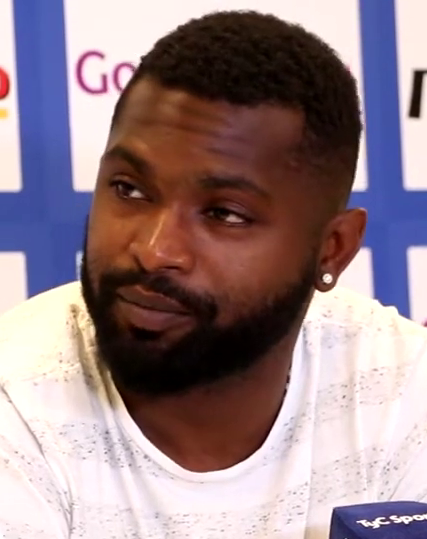
- García in 2018

Personal information
- Full name: Santiago Damián García Correa
- Date of birth: 14 September 1990
- Place of birth: Montevideo, Uruguay
- Date of death: 4 February 2021 (aged 30)
- Place of death: Godoy Cruz, Mendoza, Argentina
- Height: 1.81 m (5 ft 11 in)
- Position: Striker

Youth career
- Club Boca
- Libertad Washington
- Nacional

Senior career*
| Years | Team | Apps | (Gls) |
| 2008–2011 | Nacional | 77 | (39) |
| 2011–2012 | Athletico Paranaense | 15 | (2) |
| 2012–2013 | Kasımpaşa | 1 | (0) |
| 2013–2014 | Nacional | 14 | (0) |
| 2014–2015 | River Plate-UY | 35 | (13) |
| 2016–2021 | Godoy Cruz | 96 | (46) |
| Total | | 238 | (100) |

International career
| 2009 | Uruguay U-20 | 9 | (5) |
- * Club domestic league appearances and goals

Santiago Damián García Correa (14 September 1990 – 4 February 2021), nicknamed Morro, was a Uruguayan professional footballer who played as a striker. His last club was Argentine club Godoy Cruz, which tenure is considered the most successful of his professional career. being the top scorer of the club in Argentine Primera División and an idol of club supporters. García was also the top scorer of the 2017–18 Argentine Primera División season with 17 goals.

== Club career ==
García started his career with the Libertad Washington youth teams. He then joined Nacional de Montevideo. He was considered one of Uruguayan football's best prospects.

He appeared on the first team in 2008, at just 17 years old, capturing everyone's attention with his speed and strength. He made his official debut on 27 July 2008 against Defensor Sporting, scoring in this game his first goal as a professional player. After his great appearances with Nacional, San Lorenzo tried to sign him without success.

During the last two seasons of the Uruguayan championship, García participated in the first team of Nacional, although he wasn't considered part of the starting team. This situation changed in the 2010–11 season, in which Garcia evolved into becoming not only part of the starting team, but also one of its most valuable players. He managed to win the Primera División championship with Nacional and ended the season as the league's top goalscorer, with 23 goals in 28 matches.

On 18 June 2011, García joined Brazilian Athletico Paranaense for €2 million, signing a five-year contract. After failing a drug test for cocaine doping, García was sold to Turkish club Kasımpaşa. In 2013, he returned to Nacional; one year later, he moved to River Plate, where he remained until January 2016 when he was signed by Godoy Cruz.

With the Mendocino team, García spent the most successful years in the history of the club. The team finished second to Boca Juniors in 2017–18 (only two points behind), and qualified to play the 2017 Copa Libertadores. During those five years playing for Godoy Cruz, García also became the club's all-time top scorer in Primera División.

== International career ==
García was a member of the Uruguay under-20 team that participated in the 2009 FIFA U-20 World Cup, where he played three games and scored one goal.

== Death and legacy ==
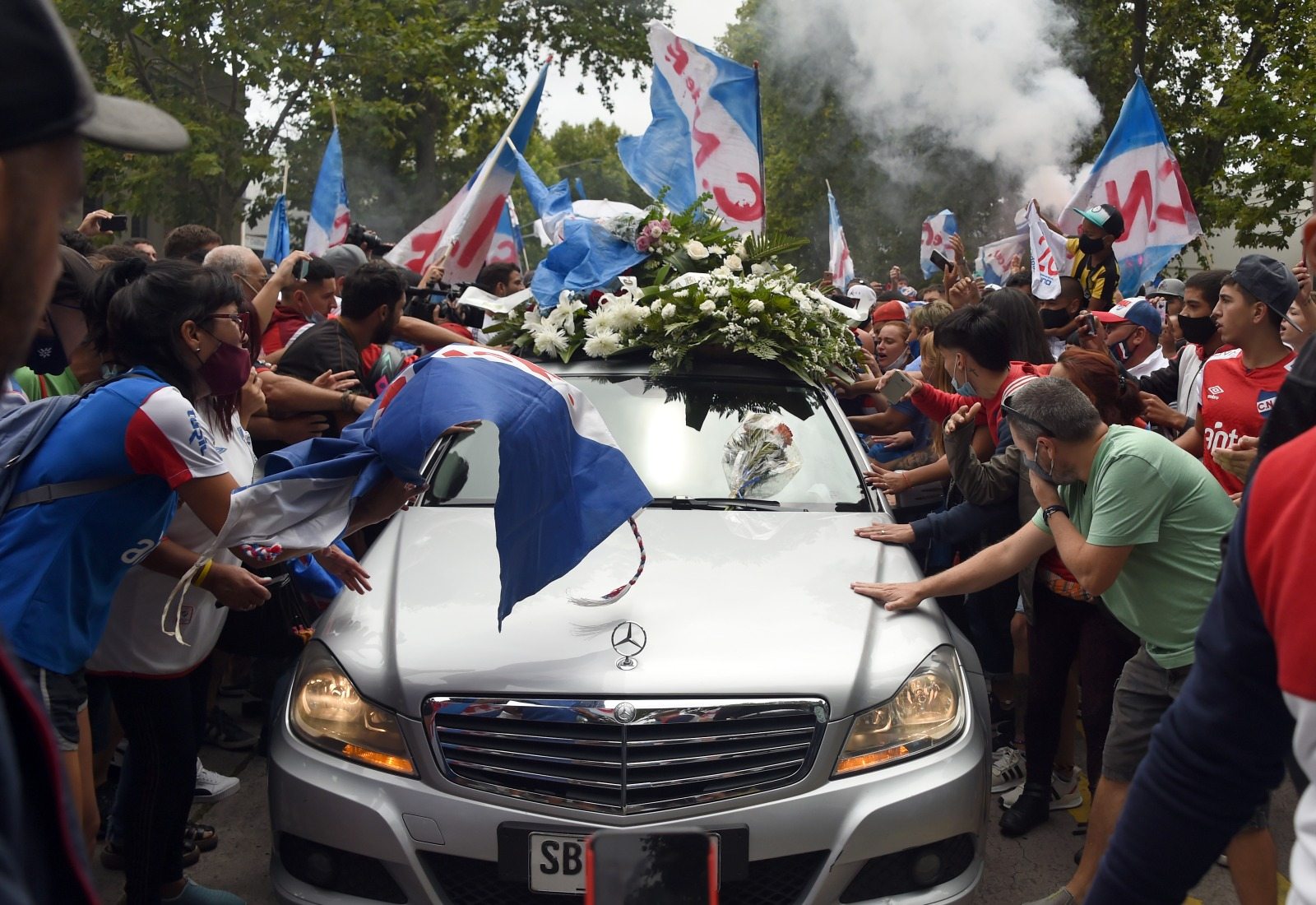
Funeral of García in Uruguay

On 6 February 2021, after several days without contact, García, aged 30, was found dead in his apartment in Godoy Cruz, with a gunshot wound in the right parietal.

He had been receiving psychiatric treatment. It was later confirmed that the cause of death was suicide by gunshot. After preliminary examinations by the Scientific Police, it was determined that he died on 4 February.

After the death of García was confirmed, Godoy Cruz announced that number 18 worn by García during his tenure with the club would be retired in his honour.
