= Jonathan Charquero =

Uruguayan footballer (born 1989)

Personal information
- Full name: Jonathan Sebastián Charquero López
- Date of birth: 21 February 1989 (age 37)
- Place of birth: Montevideo, Uruguay
- Height: 1.83 m (6 ft 0 in)
- Position: Forward

Team information
- Current team: Coatepeque

Youth career
- Montevideo Wanderers

Senior career*
| Years | Team | Apps | (Gls) |
| 2006–2010 | Montevideo Wanderers | 63 | (20) |
| 2011 | Nacional Montevideo | 5 | (2) |
| 2012 | Alianza Lima | 15 | (1) |
| 2013 | Cerro | 7 | (0) |
| 2013–2014 | Juventud Las Piedras | 9 | (1) |
| 2014–2015 | Boston River | 33 | (9) |
| 2015–2016 | Torque | 21 | (14) |
| 2016–2017 | Santiago Wanderers | 15 | (1) |
| 2018 | Villa Teresa | 8 | (1) |
| 2018–2019 | Cobán Imperial | 37 | (7) |
| 2019 | Cerro Largo | 2 | (0) |
| 2020 | Rampla Juniors | 1 | (0) |
| 2021– | Coatepeque | | |

International career
| 2009 | Uruguay U-20 | 5 | (1) |
- * Club domestic league appearances and goals as of 17:26, 13 November 2021 (UTC)

Jonathan Sebastián Charquero López (born 21 February 1989) is a Uruguayan footballer currently plays for Deportivo Coatepeque.

== Club career ==
Charquero was born in Montevideo. On 17 September 2021, he joined Guatemalan club Deportivo Coatepeque.

== International career ==
Charquero has played for the Uruguay under-20 team at the 2009 FIFA U-20 World Cup in Egypt. Previously, he played the 2009 South American Youth Championship in Venezuela where he scored a goal against Colombia.
