= Football at the 2015 Pan American Games – Men's team squads =

This article shows the rosters of all participating teams at the men's football tournament at the 2015 Pan American Games in Toronto. Rosters could have a maximum of 18 athletes.

== Group A ==
=== Brazil ===
The roster for Brazil was as follows.

Head coach: Rogério Micale

No.	Pos.	Player	Date of birth (age)	Club
1	GK	Jacsson	March 12, 1994 (aged 21)	(Brazilian Football Confederation) Internacional
2	DF	Gilberto	March 7, 1993 (aged 22)	(Brazilian Football Confederation) Botafogo
3	DF	Bressan	January 15, 1993 (aged 22)	(Brazilian Football Confederation) Flamengo
4	DF	Luan	May 10, 1993 (aged 22)	(Brazilian Football Confederation) Vasco da Gama
5	MF	Bruno Paulista	August 21, 1995 (aged 19)	(Brazilian Football Confederation) Bahia
6	DF	Vinícius Freitas	March 7, 1993 (aged 22)	(Italian Football Federation) Perugia
7	MF	Barreto	December 10, 1995 (aged 19)	(Brazilian Football Confederation) Criciúma
8	MF	Dodô	September 5, 1994 (aged 20)	(Brazilian Football Confederation) Atlético Mineiro
9	FW	Erik	July 18, 1994 (aged 20)	(Brazilian Football Confederation) Goiás
10	FW	Lucas Piazon	January 20, 1994 (aged 21)	(German Football Association) Eintracht Frankfurt
11	FW	Clayton	October 23, 1995 (aged 19)	(Brazilian Football Confederation) Figueirense
12	GK	Andrey	July 17, 1993 (aged 21)	(Brazilian Football Confederation) Botafogo-SP
13	DF	Tinga	September 1, 1993 (aged 21)	(Brazilian Football Confederation) Fortaleza
14	DF	Gustavo Henrique	March 24, 1993 (aged 22)	(Brazilian Football Confederation) Santos
15	DF	Euller	January 4, 1995 (aged 20)	(Brazilian Football Confederation) Vitória
16	MF	Rômulo	October 27, 1995 (aged 19)	(Brazilian Football Confederation) Bahia
17	MF	Eurico	April 16, 1994 (aged 21)	(Brazilian Football Confederation) Cruzeiro
18	FW	Luciano	May 18, 1993 (aged 22)	(Brazilian Football Confederation) Corinthians

=== Canada ===
Canada announced their squad on June 19, 2015.

Head coach: (Spain) Antonio Floro

No.	Pos.	Player	Date of birth (age)	Club
1	GK	Ricky Gomes	July 19, 1993 (aged 21)	(Royal Dutch Football Association) MVV Maastricht
2	DF	Jonathan Grant	October 15, 1993 (aged 21)	(Canadian Soccer Association) FC Montreal
3	DF	Kevon Black	February 11, 1996 (aged 19)	(Canadian Soccer Association) Toronto FC II
4	DF	Jackson Farmer	May 3, 1995 (aged 20)	(Canadian Soccer Association) Whitecaps FC 2
5	DF	Manjrekar James	August 5, 1993 (aged 21)	Unattached
6	MF	Chris Mannella	June 7, 1994 (aged 21)	(Canadian Soccer Association) Toronto FC
7	FW	Ben Fisk	February 4, 1993 (aged 22)	(Royal Spanish Football Federation) Coruxo
8	MF	Manny Aparicio	September 17, 1995 (aged 19)	(Canadian Soccer Association) Toronto FC II
9	FW	Caleb Clarke	June 23, 1993 (aged 22)	(Canadian Soccer Association) Vancouver Whitecaps FC
10	MF	Keven Alemán	March 25, 1994 (aged 21)	(Costa Rican Football Federation) Herediano
11	FW	Molham Babouli	January 2, 1993 (aged 22)	(Canadian Soccer Association) Toronto FC II
12	DF	Alex Comsia	August 1, 1996 (aged 18)	(United States Soccer Federation) Carolina RailHawks
14	MF	Louis Béland-Goyette	September 15, 1995 (aged 19)	(Canadian Soccer Association) FC Montreal
15	FW	Raheem Edwards	July 17, 1995 (aged 19)	(Canadian Soccer Association) Toronto FC II
16	FW	Hanson Boakai	October 28, 1996 (aged 18)	(Canadian Soccer Association) FC Edmonton
17	DF	Adam Bouchard	March 12, 1996 (aged 19)	(Canadian Soccer Association) Toronto FC II
18	MF	Jérémy Gagnon-Laparé	March 9, 1995 (aged 20)	(Canadian Soccer Association) Montreal Impact
22	GK	Maxime Crépeau	May 11, 1994 (aged 21)	(Canadian Soccer Association) Montreal Impact

=== Panama ===
The roster for Panama was as follows.

Head coach: (Argentina) Leonardo Pipino

No.	Pos.	Player	Date of birth (age)	Club
1	GK	Jaime de Gracia	May 11, 1996 (aged 19)	(Panamanian Football Federation) Tauro
2	DF	Richard Dixon	March 28, 1992 (aged 23)	(Panamanian Football Federation) Chorrillo
3	DF	Josué Flores	March 31, 1993 (aged 22)	(Panamanian Football Federation) Chorrillo
4	DF	Carlos Rodríguez	April 12, 1990 (aged 25)	(Panamanian Football Federation) Chepo
5	MF	Francisco Narbón	February 11, 1995 (aged 20)	(United States Soccer Federation) James Madison University
6	DF	Fidel Escobar	January 9, 1995 (aged 20)	(Panamanian Football Federation) Sporting San Miguelito
7	MF	Jairo Jiménez	January 7, 1993 (aged 22)	(Royal Spanish Football Federation) Elche B
8	MF	Pedro Jeanine	September 4, 1993 (aged 21)	(Panamanian Football Federation) San Francisco
9	FW	Cecilio Waterman	April 13, 1991 (aged 24)	(Uruguayan Football Association) Fenix
10	MF	Jhamal Rodríguez	January 28, 1995 (aged 20)	(Panamanian Football Federation) Chorrillo
11	FW	Jorman Aguilar	September 11, 1994 (aged 20)	(Panamanian Football Federation) Independiente
12	GK	Elieser Powell	April 21, 1994 (aged 21)	(Panamanian Football Federation) Chorrillo
13	DF	Jan Vargas	September 27, 1994 (aged 20)	(Panamanian Football Federation) Tauro
14	DF	Michael Amir Murillo	February 11, 1996 (aged 19)	(Panamanian Football Federation) San Francisco
15	DF	Richard Peralta	September 20, 1993 (aged 21)	(Panamanian Football Federation) Alianza
16	MF	José Muñoz	January 15, 1993 (aged 22)	(Panamanian Football Federation) Alianza
17	MF	Josiel Núñez	January 29, 1993 (aged 22)	(Panamanian Football Federation) Plaza Amador
18	FW	Yoel Bárcenas	October 23, 1993 (aged 21)	(Panamanian Football Federation) Arabe Unido

=== Peru ===
The following was Peru's roster for the 2015 Pan American Games.

Head coach: Víctor Rivera

No.	Pos.	Player	Date of birth (age)	Club
1	GK	Jonathan Medina	April 29, 1993 (aged 22)	(Peruvian Football Federation) Melgar
2	DF	Yordi Vílchez	February 13, 1995 (aged 20)	(Peruvian Football Federation) Juan Aurich
3	DF	Brian Bernaola	January 17, 1995 (aged 20)	(Peruvian Football Federation) Sporting Cristal
4	DF	Saúl Salas	October 10, 1994 (aged 20)	(Peruvian Football Federation) Municipal
5	DF	Elsar Rodas	February 28, 1994 (aged 21)	(Peruvian Football Federation) Sporting Cristal
6	MF	Rafael Guarderas	September 12, 1993 (aged 21)	(Peruvian Football Federation) Universitario
7	FW	Ray Sandoval	May 29, 1995 (aged 20)	(Peruvian Football Federation) Real Garcilaso
8	MF	Renzo Garcés	June 12, 1996 (aged 19)	(Peruvian Football Federation) USMP
9	FW	Gonzalo Maldonado	May 18, 1994 (aged 21)	(Peruvian Football Federation) Universitario
10	MF	Victor Cedron	October 6, 1993 (aged 21)	(Peruvian Football Federation) Cesar Vallejo
11	FW	Kevin Ruiz	February 14, 1995 (aged 20)	(Peruvian Football Federation) Universitario
12	GK	Daniel Prieto	July 1, 1995 (aged 20)	(Peruvian Football Federation) Alianza Lima
13	DF	Joaquín Aguirre	July 24, 1995 (aged 19)	(Peruvian Football Federation) Universitario
14	MF	Pedro Aquino	April 13, 1995 (aged 20)	(Peruvian Football Federation) Sporting Cristal
15	MF	José Manzaneda	September 10, 1994 (aged 20)	(Peruvian Football Federation) Juan Aurich
16	DF	Juan Diego Li	February 16, 1995 (aged 20)	(Peruvian Football Federation) Alianza Lima
17	MF	Juan Morales	March 6, 1989 (aged 26)	(Peruvian Football Federation) Cesar Vallejo
18	MF	Alexis Arias	December 13, 1995 (aged 19)	(Peruvian Football Federation) Melgar

== Group B ==
=== Mexico ===
The roster for Mexico was as follows.

Head coach: Raúl Gutiérrez

No.	Pos.	Player	Date of birth (age)	Club
1	GK	Gibrán Lajud	December 25, 1993 (aged 21)	(Mexican Football Federation) Tijuana
2	DF	Carlos Guzmán	May 19, 1994 (aged 21)	(Mexican Football Federation) Tijuana
3	DF	Hedgardo Marín	February 21, 1993 (aged 22)	(Mexican Football Federation) Guadalajara
4	DF	Luis López	August 25, 1993 (aged 21)	(Mexican Football Federation) Monterrey
5	DF	José Abella	February 10, 1994 (aged 21)	(Mexican Football Federation) Santos Laguna
6	DF	Josecarlos Van Rankin	May 14, 1993 (aged 22)	(Mexican Football Federation) UNAM
7	MF	Jonathan Espericueta	August 9, 1994 (aged 20)	(Mexican Football Federation) UANL
8	MF	Uvaldo Luna	December 21, 1993 (aged 21)	(Mexican Football Federation) UANL
9	FW	Marco Bueno	March 31, 1994 (aged 21)	(Mexican Football Federation) León
10	FW	Ángel Zaldívar	February 8, 1994 (aged 21)	(Mexican Football Federation) Guadalajara
11	MF	Carlos Cisneros	August 30, 1993 (aged 21)	(Mexican Football Federation) Guadalajara
12	GK	Luis Cárdenas	September 15, 1993 (aged 21)	(Mexican Football Federation) Monterrey
13	DF	Jordan Silva	July 30, 1994 (aged 20)	(Mexican Football Federation) Toluca
14	MF	Kevin Escamilla	February 21, 1994 (aged 21)	(Mexican Football Federation) UNAM
15	MF	Michael Pérez	March 14, 1994 (aged 21)	(Mexican Football Federation) Guadalajara
16	MF	Alfonso Tamay	May 13, 1993 (aged 22)	(Mexican Football Federation) Puebla
17	FW	Martín Zúñiga	April 14, 1993 (aged 22)	(Mexican Football Federation) América
18	MF	Daniel Álvarez	July 22, 1994 (aged 20)	(Mexican Football Federation) Atlas

=== Paraguay ===
Head coach: Carlos Jara Saguier

No.	Pos.	Player	Date of birth (age)	Club
1	GK	Ignacio Don	February 28, 1982 (aged 33)	(Paraguayan Football Association) Nacional
2	DF	Miller Mareco	January 31, 1994 (aged 21)	(Paraguayan Football Association) San Lorenzo
3	DF	Luis Giménez	August 1, 1998 (aged 16)	(Paraguayan Football Association) Olimpia
4	DF	Gustavo Villamayor	March 29, 1993 (aged 22)	Unattached
5	DF	Iván Cañete	April 22, 1995 (aged 20)	(Royal Spanish Football Federation) Atlético Madrid
6	MF	Iván Ramírez	December 8, 1994 (aged 20)	Unattached
7	MF	Alan Benítez	January 25, 1994 (aged 21)	Unattached
8	MF	Ángel Cardozo Lucena	October 19, 1994 (aged 20)	Unattached
9	FW	Walter González	May 21, 1995 (aged 20)	(Paraguayan Football Association) Olimpia
10	FW	Miguel Almirón	February 10, 1994 (aged 21)	(Paraguayan Football Association) Cerro Porteño
11	MF	Derlis Alegre	January 10, 1994 (aged 21)	(Paraguayan Football Association) Sportivo Luqueno
12	GK	Gabriel Perrotta	December 26, 1998 (aged 16)	(Paraguayan Football Association) Nacional
13	DF	Juan Escobar	July 3, 1995 (aged 20)	(Paraguayan Football Association) Sportivo Luqueno
14	MF	Cristhian Paredes	May 18, 1998 (aged 17)	(Paraguayan Football Association) Sol de America
15	MF	Arturo Aranda	April 20, 1998 (aged 17)	(Paraguayan Football Association) Libertad
16	FW	Sebastián Ferreira	February 13, 1998 (aged 17)	(Paraguayan Football Association) Olimpia
17	MF	Walter Clar	September 27, 1994 (aged 20)	(Paraguayan Football Association) Rubio Ñu
18	FW	Cristian Colmán	February 26, 1994 (aged 21)	(Paraguayan Football Association) Nacional

=== Trinidad and Tobago ===
The roster for Trinidad and Tobago was as follows.

Head coach: (Montenegro) Zoran Vraneš

No.	Pos.	Player	Date of birth (age)	Club
1	GK	Montell Joseph	January 22, 1997 (aged 18)	(The Football Association) Forest United
2	DF	Shannon Gomez	October 5, 1996 (aged 18)	(Trinidad and Tobago Football Association) W Connection
3	DF	Maurice Ford	September 6, 1996 (aged 18)	(Trinidad and Tobago Football Association) W Connection
4	DF	Jesus Perez	September 11, 1995 (aged 19)	(Trinidad and Tobago Football Association) North East Stars
5	DF	Dario Holmes	February 9, 1994 (aged 21)	(Trinidad and Tobago Football Association) San Juan Jabloteh
6	MF	Neveal Hackshaw	September 21, 1995 (aged 19)	(Trinidad and Tobago Football Association) North East Stars
7	MF	Jomal Williams	April 28, 1994 (aged 21)	(Trinidad and Tobago Football Association) W Connection
8	DF	Triston Hodge	October 9, 1994 (aged 20)	(Trinidad and Tobago Football Association) W Connection
9	MF	Nathaniel García	April 24, 1993 (aged 22)	(Trinidad and Tobago Football Association) Central FC
10	FW	Duane Muckette	July 1, 1995 (aged 20)	(United States Soccer Federation) South Florida University
11	FW	Shackeil Henry	April 2, 1994 (aged 21)	(Trinidad and Tobago Football Association) Point Fortin Civic
12	MF	Xavier Rajpaul	September 26, 1994 (aged 20)	(United States Soccer Federation) Charleston Cougars
13	FW	Ricardo John	April 10, 1995 (aged 20)	(United States Soccer Federation) Virginia Tech
14	MF	Jelani Felix	November 22, 1993 (aged 21)	(Trinidad and Tobago Football Association) Defence Force
15	FW	Neil Benjamin	August 20, 1994 (aged 20)	(Trinidad and Tobago Football Association) W Connection
16	DF	Alvin Jones	July 9, 1994 (aged 21)	(Trinidad and Tobago Football Association) W Connection
17	DF	Aikim Andrews	June 20, 1996 (aged 19)	(Trinidad and Tobago Football Association) W Connection
18	GK	Jovan Sample	April 13, 1995 (aged 20)	(Trinidad and Tobago Football Association) Central FC

=== Uruguay ===
The roster for Uruguay was as follows.

Head coach: Fabián Coito

No.	Pos.	Player	Date of birth (age)	Club
1	GK	Guillermo de Amores	October 19, 1994 (aged 20)	(Uruguayan Football Association) Liverpool
2	DF	Sebastián Gorga	April 6, 1994 (aged 21)	(Uruguayan Football Association) Nacional
3	DF	Federico Ricca	December 1, 1994 (aged 20)	(Uruguayan Football Association) Danubio
4	DF	Mauricio Lemos	December 28, 1995 (aged 19)	(Uruguayan Football Association) Defensor Sporting
5	MF	Andrés Schettino	May 26, 1994 (aged 21)	(Uruguayan Football Association) Fenix
6	DF	Fabricio Formiliano	January 13, 1993 (aged 22)	(Uruguayan Football Association) Danubio
7	MF	Facundo Castro	February 22, 1995 (aged 20)	(Uruguayan Football Association) Defensor Sporting
8	FW	Juan Cruz Mascia	January 3, 1994 (aged 21)	(Uruguayan Football Association) Nacional
9	FW	Junior Arias	May 17, 1993 (aged 22)	(Uruguayan Football Association) Liverpool
10	FW	Michael Santos	March 13, 1993 (aged 22)	(Uruguayan Football Association) River Plate
11	MF	Ignacio González	November 5, 1993 (aged 21)	(Uruguayan Football Association) Danubio
12	GK	Gastón Olveira	April 21, 1993 (aged 22)	(Uruguayan Football Association) River Plate
13	DF	Erick Cabaco	April 19, 1995 (aged 20)	(Uruguayan Football Association) Rentistas
14	MF	Gastón Faber	April 21, 1996 (aged 19)	(Uruguayan Football Association) Danubio
15	DF	Fernando Gorriarán	November 27, 1994 (aged 20)	(Uruguayan Football Association) River Plate
16	FW	Nicolás Albarracín	June 11, 1993 (aged 22)	(Uruguayan Football Association) Montevideo Wanderers
17	DF	Mathías Suárez	June 24, 1996 (aged 19)	(Uruguayan Football Association) Defensor Sporting
18	FW	Brian Lozano	February 23, 1994 (aged 21)	(Uruguayan Football Association) Defensor Sporting
