= Football at the 2015 Pan American Games =

- Football pictogram for the games
- Venues: Hamilton Pan Am Soccer Stadium
- Dates: July 11–26
- No. of events: 2 (1 men, 1 women)
- Competitors: 286 from 12 nations

Association football (soccer) competitions at the 2015 Pan American Games in Toronto were held from July 11 to 26 at Tim Hortons Field (renamed Hamilton Pan Am Soccer Stadium due to sponsorship rules) in Hamilton. The men's tournament were an under-22 competition with a maximum of three over-age players allowed, while the women's tournament had no age restrictions. A total of eight teams competed in each respective tournament.

== Competition schedule ==
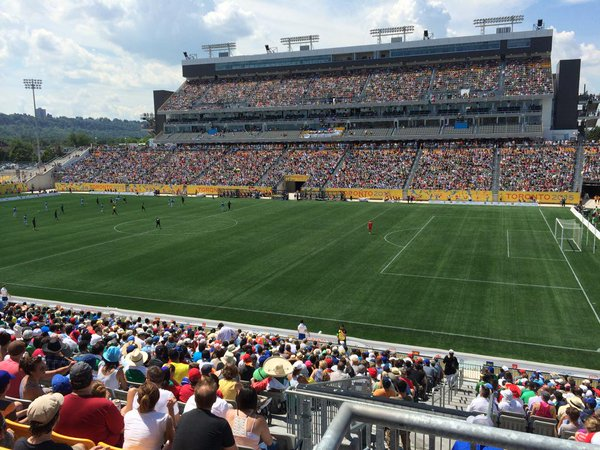
Tim Hortons Field (Hamilton Pan Am Soccer Stadium), was the venue for the football competitions

The following was the competition schedule for the football competitions:

P	Preliminaries	½	Semifinals	B	3rd place play-off	F	Final

Event↓/Date →	Sat 11	Sun 12	Mon 13	Tue 14	Wed 15	Thu 16	Fri 17	Sat 18	Sun 19	Mon 20	Tue 21	Wed 22	Thu 23	Fri 24	Sat 25	Sun 26
Men		P	P			P	P			P	P		½		B	F
Women	P			P	P			P	P			½		B	F	

== Medal table ==
Rank	Nation	Gold	Silver	Bronze	Total
1	Brazil	1	0	1	2
2	Uruguay	1	0	0	1
3	Mexico	0	1	1	2
4	Colombia	0	1	0	1
Totals (4 entries)		2	2	2	6

== Medalists ==
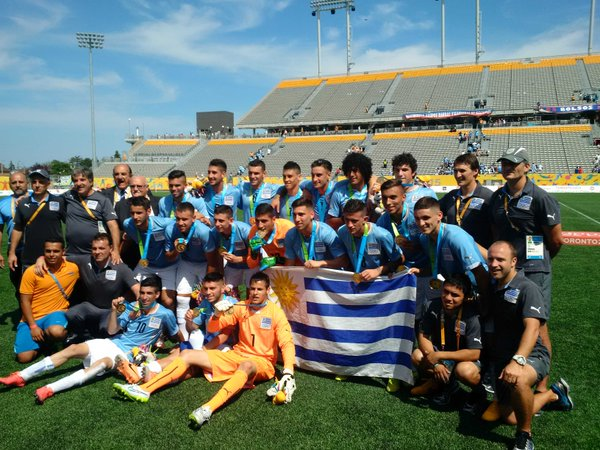
Uruguay's gold medal men's soccer team

Brazil's gold medal women's soccer team

Event	Gold	Silver	Bronze
Men's tournament	Uruguay; Guillermo de Amores; Sebastián Gorga; Federico Ricca; Mauricio Lemos; Andrés Schettino; Fabricio Formiliano; Facundo Ismael Castro; Juan Cruz Mascia; Junior Arias; Michael Santos; Ignacio González; Gastón Olveira; Erick Cabaco; Gastón Faber; Fernando Gorriarán; Nicolás Albarracín; Mathías Suárez; Brian Lozano	Mexico; Gibrán Lajud; Carlos Guzmán; Hedgardo Marín; Luis López; José Abella; Josecarlos Van Rankin; Jonathan Espericueta; Uvaldo Luna; Marco Bueno; Ángel Zaldívar; Carlos Cisneros; Luis Cárdenas; Jordan Silva; Kevin Escamilla; Michael Pérez; Alfonso Tamay; Martín Zúñiga; Daniel Álvarez	Brazil; Jacsson; Gilberto; Bressan; Luan; Bruno Paulista; Vinícius Freitas; Barreto; Dodô; Erik; Lucas Piazon; Clayton; Andrey; Tinga; Gustavo Henrique; Euller; Rômulo; Eurico; Luciano
Women's tournament	Brazil; Luciana; Bárbara; Fabiana; Monica; Rafaelle; Thaisa; Tamires; Formiga; Andressa Alves; Andressa Machry; Cristiane; Raquel; Maurine; Poliana; Érika; Gabi; Darlene; Géssica	Colombia; Paula Forero; Sandra Sepúlveda; Stefany Castaño; Isabella Echeverri; Natalia Gaitán; Diana Ospina; Daniela Montoya; Ingrid Vidal; Mildrey Pineda; Oriánica Velásquez; Catalina Usme; Ángela Clavijo; Nataly Arias; Tatiana Ariza; Carolina Arias; Leicy Santos	Mexico; Cecilia Santiago; Pamela Tajonar; Kenti Robles; Christina Murillo; Greta Espinoza; Valeria Miranda; Jennifer Ruiz; Nayeli Rangel; Teresa Noyola; Nancy Antonio; Stephany Mayor; Mónica Ocampo; Bianca Sierra; Arianna Romero; Monica Alvarado; Fabiola Ibarra; Verónica Pérez; Maria Sánchez

== Qualification ==
A total of eight men's teams and eight women's teams qualified to compete at the games. Each team can consist of up to 18 athletes.

=== Men ===
Event	Date	Location	Vacancies	Qualified
Host Nation	—N/a	—N/a	1	Canada
Qualified automatically	—N/a	—N/a	1	Mexico
Central American Qualifier	July 17–29, 2014	El Salvador	1	Panama
Caribbean Qualifier	September 12–19, 2014	Trinidad and Tobago	1	Trinidad and Tobago
South American Qualifier (teams placed 3rd to 6th)	January 14 – February 7, 2015	Uruguay	4	Uruguay; Brazil; Peru; Paraguay
Total			8	

=== Women ===
Event	Date	Location	Vacancies	Qualified
Host Nation	—N/a	—N/a	1	Canada
Qualified automatically	—N/a	—N/a	1	Mexico
Central American Qualifier	May 20–26, 2014	Guatemala	1	Costa Rica
Caribbean Qualifier	August 19–26, 2014	Trinidad and Tobago	1	Trinidad and Tobago
South American Qualifier	September 11–28, 2014	Ecuador	4	Brazil; Colombia; Ecuador; Argentina
Total			8	

== Participating nations ==
A total of twelve nations have qualified football teams. The numbers in parentheses represents the number of participants entered.

- Argentina (18)
- Brazil (36)
- Canada (36)
- Colombia (16)
- Costa Rica (18)
- Ecuador (18)
- Mexico (36)
- Panama (18)
- Paraguay (18)
- Peru (18)
- Trinidad and Tobago (36)
- Uruguay (18)

== Concerns ==
There was some concern that, as the event is in close proximity to the Women's World Cup and the men's Gold Cup that full-strength teams would not be fielded, particularly in the women's event which is not age-restricted, which in turn would affect quality of play. A spokesperson for the Canadian Soccer Association confirmed that younger players would make up the Canadian women's side. Six teams in the women's draw participated in the World Cup which finished six days prior to the start of the Pan Am tournament.
