= Football at the 2015 Pan American Games – Men's tournament =

Football – Men's tournament at the 2015 Pan American Games
- Venue: Hamilton Pan Am Soccer Stadium
- Dates: 12–26 July
- Competitors: 144 from 8 nations

Medalists
| Gold medal | Uruguay |
| Silver medal | Mexico |
| Bronze medal | Brazil |

The men's football tournament at the 2015 Pan American Games in Toronto, Canada was held at the Hamilton Pan Am Soccer Stadium in Hamilton from July 12 to 26.

For the football competition in these Games, the men competed in an eight-team tournament. The teams were grouped into two pools of four teams each for a round-robin preliminary round. The top two teams in each group advanced to a single elimination bracket. The men's competition was an under-22 event, with each team supplemented with up to three over age players.

Mexico were the defending champions from the 2011 Pan American Games in Guadalajara. The gold medal was won by Uruguay.

== Qualification ==
A total of eight men's teams qualified to compete at the games. Hosts Canada and Mexico qualified automatically. The winners of the regional Caribbean and Central American championships also qualified. Teams placing between 3rd and 6th at the South American Championship also qualified.

=== Summary ===
| Event | Date | Location | Vacancies | Qualified |
|---|---|---|---|---|
| Host Nation | —N/a | —N/a | 1 | Canada |
| Qualified automatically | —N/a | —N/a | 1 | Mexico |
| Central American Qualifier | July 17–29, 2014 | El Salvador | 1 | Panama |
| Caribbean Qualifier | September 12–19, 2014 | Trinidad and Tobago | 1 | Trinidad and Tobago |
| South American Qualifier | January 14 – February 7, 2015 | Uruguay | 4 | Uruguay; Brazil; Peru; Paraguay |
| Total | | | 8 | |

=== Qualified teams ===
The following eight teams qualified for the final tournament.

| Team | Appearance | Previous best performance |
|---|---|---|
| Brazil | 11th | Gold medal (1963, 1975, 1979, 1987) |
| Canada (hosts) | 7th | Fourth place (1967, 1999) |
| Mexico | 14th | Gold medal (1967, 1975, 1999, 2011) |
| Panama | 1st | Debut |
| Paraguay | 5th | Fourth place (1951) |
| Peru | 1st | Debut |
| Trinidad and Tobago | 9th | Bronze medal (1967) |
| Uruguay | 6th | Gold medal (1983) |

== Medalists ==
| Event | Gold | Silver | Bronze |
|---|---|---|---|
| Men's tournament | Uruguay 1 – Guillermo de Amores; 2 – Sebastián Gorga; 3 – Federico Ricca; 4 – Mauricio Lemos; 5 – Andrés Schetino; 6 – Fabricio Formiliano; 7 – Facundo Castro; 8 – Juan Cruz Mascia; 9 – Junior Arias; 10 – Michael Santos; 11 – Ignacio González; 12 – Gastón Olveira; 13 – Erick Cabaco; 14 – Gastón Faber; 15 – Fernando Gorriarán; 16 – Nicolás Albarracín; 17 – Mathías Suárez; 18 – Brian Lozano (HC – Fabián Coito) | Mexico 1 – Gibrán Lajud; 2 – Carlos Guzmán; 3 – Hedgardo Marín; 4 – Luis Alberto López; 5 – José Abella; 6 – José Van Rankin; 7 – Jonathan Espericueta; 8 – Uvaldo Luna; 9 – Marco Bueno; 10 – Ángel Zaldívar; 11 – Carlos Cisneros; 12 – Luis Cárdenas; 13 – Jordan Silva; 14 – Kevin Escamilla; 15 – Michael Pérez; 16 – Alfonso Tamay; 17 – Martín Eduardo Zúñiga; 18 – Daniel Álvarez (HC – Raúl Gutiérrez) | Brazil 1 – Jacsson; 2 – Gilberto; 3 – Bressan; 4 – Luan; 5 – Bruno Paulista; 6 – Vinícius Freitas; 7 – Barreto; 8 – Dodô; 9 – Erik; 10 – Lucas Piazon; 11 – Clayton; 12 – Andrey; 13 – Tinga; 14 – Gustavo Henrique; 15 – Euller; 16 – Rômulo; 17 – Eurico; 18 – Luciano (HC – Rogério Micale) |

== Squads ==
At the start of tournament, all eight participating countries had to submit up to 18 players on their squads.

- Brazil
- Canada
- Mexico
- Panama
- Paraguay
- Peru
- Trinidad and Tobago
- Uruguay

== Competition format ==
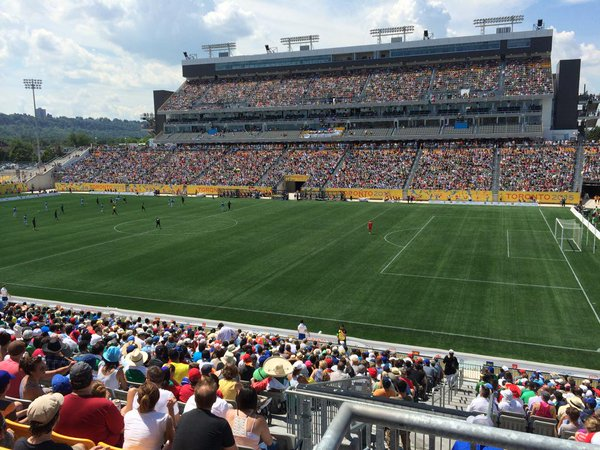
Tim Hortons Field (Hamilton Pan Am Soccer Stadium), was the venue for the football competitions

In the first round of the competition, teams were divided into two groups of four teams, played in round-robin format with each of the teams playing all other teams in the group once. Teams were awarded three points for a win, one point for a draw and zero points for a loss. The teams were ranked as follows:

1. Points
2. Goal difference
3. Goals scored
4. Head-to-head points
5. Drawing of lots

Following the completion of the group games, the top two teams in each group advanced to the semifinals, with the winners of one group playing the runners-up of another group. The winners of the semifinals advanced to the gold medal match and the losers advanced to the bronze medal match.

All games were played in two 45-minute halves. In the medal round, if the match ended in a draw after 90 minutes, extra time was played (two 15-minute halves), followed by penalty kicks competition if the match still remained tied.

== First round ==
The official detailed schedule and draw was revealed on April 24, 2015.

All times were Eastern Daylight Time (UTC−4)

=== Group A ===
| Pos | Team | Pld | W | D | L | GF | GA | GD | Pts | Qualification |
|---|---|---|---|---|---|---|---|---|---|---|
| 1 | Brazil | 3 | 2 | 1 | 0 | 11 | 4 | +7 | 7 | Medal round |
| 2 | Panama | 3 | 1 | 2 | 0 | 5 | 4 | +1 | 5 | Medal round |
| 3 | Peru | 3 | 1 | 0 | 2 | 3 | 6 | −3 | 3 | |
| 4 | Canada (H) | 3 | 0 | 1 | 2 | 1 | 6 | −5 | 1 | |

Source: Toronto 2015
(H) Hosts
July 12, 2015
17:35

| Panama | 2–1 | Peru |
|---|---|---|
| Aguilar 47'; Escobar 90' (pen.) | Report | Maldonado 54' |

Hamilton Pan Am Soccer Stadium, Hamilton
Referee: Jeffrey Solís (Costa Rica)

July 12, 2015
20:35

| Canada | 1–4 | Brazil |
|---|---|---|
| Babouli 58' | Report | Luciano 7'; Rômulo 38'; Clayton 47'; Erik 89' |

Hamilton Pan Am Soccer Stadium, Hamilton
Referee: José Peñaloza (Mexico)

July 16, 2015
17:35

| Peru | 0–4 | Brazil |
|---|---|---|
| | Report | Luan 3'; Clayton 20'; Rômulo 26'; Dodô 30' |

Hamilton Pan Am Soccer Stadium, Hamilton
Referee: Raúl Castro (Honduras)

July 16, 2015
20:35

| Panama | 0–0 | Canada |
|---|---|---|
| | Report |

Hamilton Pan Am Soccer Stadium, Hamilton
Referee: Valdin Legister (Jamaica)

July 20, 2015
17:35

| Brazil | 3–3 | Panama |
|---|---|---|
| Luciano 24', 25'; Clayton 37' | Report | Aguilar 40', 51'; Escobar 56' (pen.) |

Hamilton Pan Am Soccer Stadium, Hamilton
Referee: José Peñaloza (Mexico)

July 20, 2015
20:35

| Canada | 0–2 | Peru |
|---|---|---|
| | Report | Rodas 12'; James 68' (o.g.) |

Hamilton Pan Am Soccer Stadium, Hamilton
Referee: Adrian Skeete (Barbados)

=== Group B ===
| Pos | Team | Pld | W | D | L | GF | GA | GD | Pts | Qualification |
|---|---|---|---|---|---|---|---|---|---|---|
| 1 | Mexico | 3 | 2 | 1 | 0 | 6 | 3 | +3 | 7 | Medal round |
| 2 | Uruguay | 3 | 2 | 0 | 1 | 5 | 1 | +4 | 6 | Medal round |
| 3 | Paraguay | 3 | 1 | 1 | 1 | 6 | 3 | +3 | 4 | |
| 4 | Trinidad and Tobago | 3 | 0 | 0 | 3 | 3 | 13 | −10 | 0 | |

Source: Toronto 2015
July 13, 2015
17:35

| Trinidad and Tobago | 0–4 | Uruguay |
|---|---|---|
| | Report | Formiliano 6'; Ricca 20'; Albarracín 31'; Lozano 69' |

Hamilton Pan Am Soccer Stadium, Hamilton
Referee: Oscar Reyna (Guatemala)

July 13, 2015
20:35

| Paraguay | 1–1 | Mexico |
|---|---|---|
| Cardozo 71' | Report | Zúñiga 15' |

Hamilton Pan Am Soccer Stadium, Hamilton
Referee: Mathieu Bourdeau (Canada)

July 17, 2015
17:35

| Mexico | 1–0 | Uruguay |
|---|---|---|
| Silva 90+1' | Report |

Hamilton Pan Am Soccer Stadium, Hamilton
Referee: Marcos Brea (Cuba)

July 17, 2015
20:35

| Paraguay | 5–1 | Trinidad and Tobago |
|---|---|---|
| Ferreira 63', 71'; Ramírez 65'; Alegre 76'; Aranda 79' | Report | García 53' |

Hamilton Pan Am Soccer Stadium, Hamilton
Referee: Javier Santos (Puerto Rico)

July 21, 2015
17:35

| Trinidad and Tobago | 2–4 | Mexico |
|---|---|---|
| John 7'; Henry 39' | Report | Espericueta 60'; Álvarez 68'; Bueno 90'; Zúñiga 90+3' |

Hamilton Pan Am Soccer Stadium, Hamilton
Referee: Sherwim Moore (Guyana)

July 21, 2015
20:35

| Uruguay | 1–0 | Paraguay |
|---|---|---|
| Gorriarán 52' | Report |

Hamilton Pan Am Soccer Stadium, Hamilton
Referee: Oscar Reyna (Guatemala)

== Medal round ==
Semifinals
July 23 – Hamilton
Brazil | 1
Uruguay | 2
July 23 – Hamilton
Mexico | 2
Panama | 1

Gold medal match
July 26 – Hamilton
Uruguay | 1
Mexico | 0
Bronze medal match
July 25 – Hamilton
Brazil (a.e.t.) | 3
Panama | 1

=== Semifinals ===
July 23, 2015
17:35

| Brazil | 1–2 | Uruguay |
|---|---|---|
| Clayton 75' | Report | Schettino 86'; Santos 87' |

Hamilton Pan Am Soccer Stadium, Hamilton
Referee: José Peñaloza (Mexico)

July 23, 2015
20:35

| Mexico | 2–1 | Panama |
|---|---|---|
| Zaldívar 2'; Cisneros 61' | Report | Núñez 59' |

Hamilton Pan Am Soccer Stadium, Hamilton
Referee: Javier Santos (Puerto Rico)

=== Bronze medal match ===
July 25, 2015
13:05

| Brazil | 3–1 (a.e.t.) | Panama |
|---|---|---|
| Luciano 76' (pen.), 115' (pen.); Lucas Piazon 99' | Report | Núñez 45+2' |

Hamilton Pan Am Soccer Stadium, Hamilton
Referee: Valdin Legister (Jamaica)

=== Gold medal match ===
July 26, 2015
13:05

| (gold) Uruguay | 1–0 | Mexico (silver) |
|---|---|---|
| Lozano 11' | Report |

Hamilton Pan Am Soccer Stadium, Hamilton
Referee: Óscar Reyna (Guatemala)

Team details

Uruguay
Mexico

| GK | 1 | Guillermo de Amores |
| DF | 2 | Sebastián Gorga |
| DF | 3 | Federico Ricca |
| DF | 6 | Fabricio Formiliano |
| DF | 17 | Mathías Suárez |
| MF | 11 | Ignacio González |
| MF | 14 | Gaston Faber |
| MF | 16 | Nicolás Albarracín | (substituted off) 66' |
| FW | 8 | Juan Cruz Mascia | (substituted off) 46' |
| FW | 18 | Brian Lozano |
| FW | 10 | Michael Santos | (substituted off) 90' |
Substitutes:
| MF | 7 | Facundo Castro | (substituted on) 46' |
| MF | 5 | Andrés Schettino | (substituted on) 66' |
| FW | 9 | Junior Arias | (substituted on) 90' |
Manager:
(Uruguay) Fabián Coito

| GK | 1 | Gibrán Lajud |
| DF | 5 | José Abella |
| DF | 3 | Hedgardo Marín |
| DF | 4 | Luis López | (substituted off) 86' |
| DF | 13 | Jordan Silva |
| MF | 6 | Josecarlos Van Rankin |
| MF | 11 | Carlos Cisneros | (substituted off) 54' |
| MF | 7 | Jonathan Espericueta |
| MF | 18 | Daniel Álvarez | (substituted off) 63' |
| FW | 9 | Marco Bueno |
| FW | 10 | Ángel Zaldívar |
Substitutes:
| MF | 15 | Michael Pérez | (substituted on) 54' |
| MF | 16 | Alfonso Tamay | (substituted on) 63' |
| FW | 17 | Martín Zúñiga | (substituted on) 86' |
Manager:
(Mexico) Raúl Gutiérrez

2015 Pan American Games winners

Uruguay
Second title

== Competition summary ==
=== Goalscorers ===
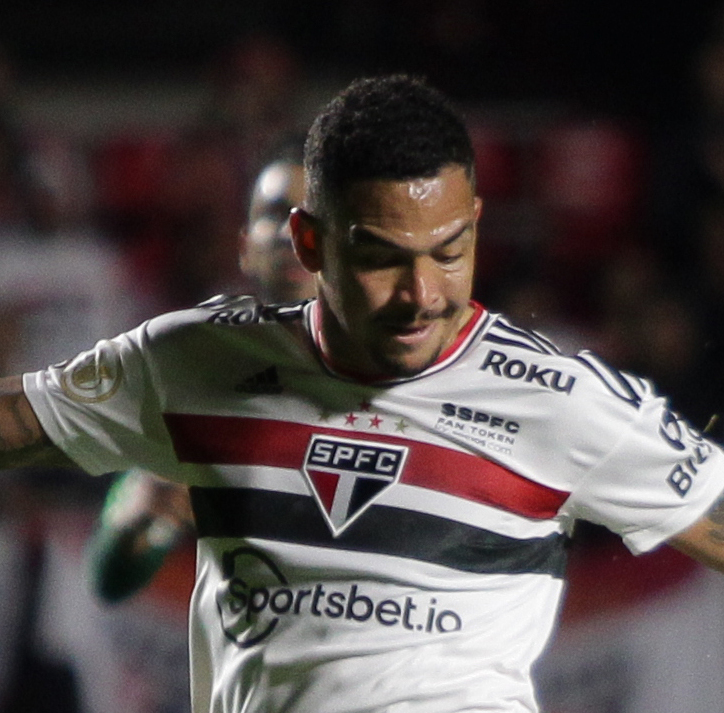
Luciano, top scorer

5 goals

- (Brazil) Luciano

4 goals

- (Brazil) Clayton

3 goals

- (Panama) Jorman Aguilar

2 goals

- (Brazil) Rômulo
- (Mexico) Martín Zúñiga
- (Panama) Fidel Escobar
- (Panama) Josiel Núñez
- (Paraguay) Sebastián Ferreira
- (Uruguay) Brian Lozano

1 goal

- (Brazil) Dodô
- (Brazil) Erik
- (Brazil) Luan
- (Brazil) Lucas Piazon
- (Canada) Molham Babouli
- (Mexico) Daniel Álvarez
- (Mexico) Marco Bueno
- (Mexico) Carlos Cisneros
- (Mexico) Jonathan Espericueta
- (Mexico) Jordan Silva
- (Mexico) Ángel Zaldívar
- (Paraguay) Derlis Alegre
- (Paraguay) Arturo Aranda
- (Paraguay) Ángel Cardozo
- (Paraguay) Iván Ramírez
- (Peru) Gonzalo Maldonado
- (Peru) Elsar Rodas
- (Trinidad and Tobago) Nathaniel García
- (Trinidad and Tobago) Shackeil Henry
- (Trinidad and Tobago) Ricardo John
- (Uruguay) Nicolás Albarracín
- (Uruguay) Fabricio Formiliano
- (Uruguay) Fernando Gorriarán
- (Uruguay) Federico Ricca
- (Uruguay) Michael Santos
- (Uruguay) Andrés Schettino

1 own goal

- (Canada) Manjrekar James (playing against Peru)

=== Final standings ===
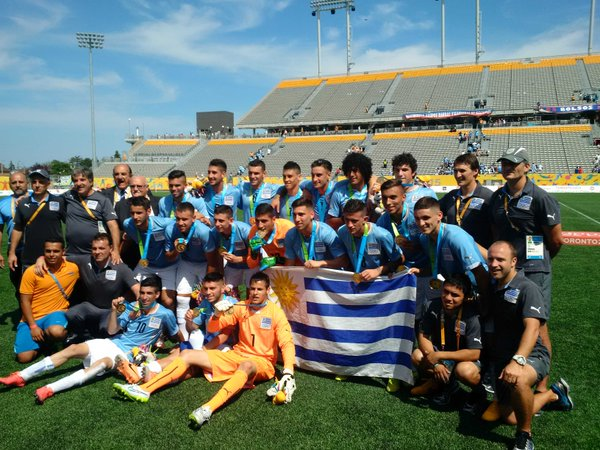
The Uruguay team posing with their gold medals

| Rank | Team | Pld | W | D | L | GF | GA | GD | Pts | Final result |
|---|---|---|---|---|---|---|---|---|---|---|
| 1st place, gold medalist(s) | Uruguay | 5 | 4 | 0 | 1 | 8 | 2 | +6 | 12 | Gold medal |
| 2nd place, silver medalist(s) | Mexico | 5 | 3 | 1 | 1 | 8 | 5 | +3 | 10 | Silver medal |
| 3rd place, bronze medalist(s) | Brazil | 5 | 3 | 1 | 1 | 15 | 7 | +8 | 10 | Bronze medal |
| 4 | Panama | 5 | 1 | 2 | 2 | 7 | 9 | −2 | 5 | Fourth place |
| 5 | Paraguay | 3 | 1 | 1 | 1 | 6 | 3 | +3 | 4 | Eliminated in First round |
| 6 | Peru | 3 | 1 | 0 | 2 | 3 | 6 | −3 | 3 | Eliminated in First round |
| 7 | Canada (H) | 3 | 0 | 1 | 2 | 1 | 6 | −5 | 1 | Eliminated in First round |
| 8 | Trinidad and Tobago | 3 | 0 | 0 | 3 | 3 | 13 | −10 | 0 | Eliminated in First round |

Source: Toronto 2015
(H) Hosts
