= Ignacio Suárez (footballer) =

Uruguayan footballer (born 2002)

Personal information
- Full name: Ignacio Nahuel Suárez Ferreira
- Date of birth: 5 February 2002 (age 24)
- Place of birth: Paysandú, Uruguay
- Height: 1.84 m (6 ft 0 in)
- Position: Goalkeeper

Team information
- Current team: Nacional
- Number: 25

Youth career
- Nacional

Senior career*
Years	Team	Apps	(Gls)
2023–	Nacional	21	(0)

International career
2017	Uruguay U15	17	(0)
2018–2019	Uruguay U17	7	(0)
2024	Uruguay U23	1	(0)
- * Club domestic league appearances and goals as of 1 October 2025

Ignacio Nahuel Suárez Ferreira (born 5 February 2002) is a Uruguayan professional footballer who plays as a goalkeeper for Nacional.

== Life and career ==
Suárez is a native of Paysandú, Uruguay. Suárez operates as a goalkeeper. He has been described as "has a good aerial game, very good technique and exit with his feet". Suárez has regarded Germany international Marc-André ter Stegen as his football idol. Suárez started his career with Uruguayan side Nacional. On 11 November 2023, he debuted for the club during a 1-1 draw with Fénix.

He is a Uruguay youth international. He has played for the Uruguay national under-15 football team, the Uruguay national under-17 football team, and the Uruguay national under-23 football team. He made seventeen appearance and scored zero goals while playing for the Uruguay national under-15 football team. He made seven appearances and scored zero goals while playing for the Uruguay national under-17 football team. In January 2024, Suárez was named in Uruguay's squad for the 2024 CONMEBOL Pre-Olympic Tournament.
