= Mathías Suárez =

Uruguayan footballer (born 1996)

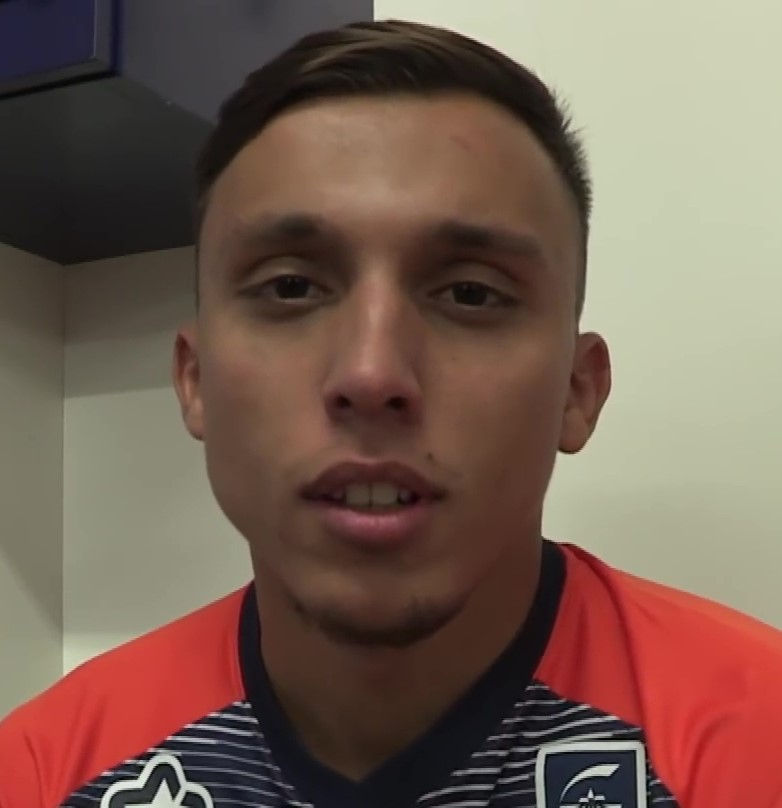
- Suárez with Montpellier in 2019

Personal information
- Full name: Mathías Sebastián Suárez Suárez
- Date of birth: 24 June 1996 (age 30)
- Place of birth: Montevideo, Uruguay
- Height: 1.84 m (6 ft 0 in)
- Position: Right-back

Team information
- Current team: Deportes Antofagasta

Youth career
- Defensor Sporting

Senior career*
Years	Team	Apps	(Gls)
2013–2019	Defensor Sporting	100	(4)
2019–2023	Montpellier	11	(0)
2019–2023	Montpellier B	15	(1)
2020	→ Nacional (loan)	9	(0)
2022	→ Montevideo City Torque (loan)	17	(0)
2024	Barcelona SC	5	(0)
2024	→ Deportivo Maldonado (loan)	13	(1)
2025	Cerro	11	(0)
2026–	Deportes Antofagasta	0	(0)

International career
2013	Uruguay U17	6	(0)
2014–2015	Uruguay U20	17	(1)
2015	Uruguay U22	5	(0)
2018–2019	Uruguay	3	(0)
Medal record
Representing Uruguay
Men's Football
Pan American Games
Gold medal – first place	2015 Toronto	Team competition
- * Club domestic league appearances and goals as of 15 January 2026

Mathías Sebastián Suárez Suárez (born 24 June 1996) is a Uruguayan professional footballer who plays as a right-back for Chilean club Deportes Antofagasta .

== Club career ==
On 2 January 2019, Suárez officially signed with Montpellier until July 2023. Suárez made his debut on 3 February 2019 against rivals Nîmes. He was substituted at the half time break due to an injury. After a clash with Nîmes goalkeeper Paul Bernardoni, he broke three ribs and the estimated injury time was four weeks.

In January 2026, Suárez moved to Chile and joined Deportes Antofagasta.

== International career ==
Suárez made his debut for Uruguay national team on 16 November 2018 in a friendly against Brazil, as a starter.

== Personal life ==
Suárez is the younger brother of Peñarol right-back Damián Suárez.

== Career statistics ==
=== International ===
As of 25 March 2019

Appearances and goals by national team and year
National team	Year	Apps	Goals
Uruguay	2018	2	0
Uruguay	2019	1	0
Total		3	0

== Honours ==
Uruguay U22

- Pan American Games: 2015
