= Federico Ricca =

Uruguayan footballer (born 1994)

Personal information
- Full name: Federico Ricca Rostagnol
- Date of birth: 1 December 1994 (age 31)
- Place of birth: Tarariras, Uruguay
- Height: 1.79 m (5 ft 10 1/2 in)
- Positions: Centre back; left back

Team information
- Current team: Belgrano
- Number: 16

Youth career
- Maracaná
- 2011–2013: Danubio

Senior career*
Years	Team	Apps	(Gls)
2013–2015	Danubio	67	(4)
2016–2019	Málaga	81	(6)
2019–2022	Club Brugge	32	(3)
2022–2025	OH Leuven	82	(3)
2025–	Belgrano	19	(0)

International career
2015	Uruguay U23	5	(1)
2017	Uruguay	1	(0)
Medal record
Representing Uruguay
Men's Football
Pan American Games
Gold medal – first place	2015 Toronto	Team competition
- * Club domestic league appearances and goals as of 17:47, 9 July 2026 (UTC)

Federico Ricca Rostagnol (born 1 December 1994) is a Uruguayan footballer who plays as a centre back or a left back for Argentine Primera División club Belgrano.

== Club career ==
=== Danubio ===
Ricca was born in Tarariras, Colonia Department. He joined Danubio FC's youth set up in 2011, after starting at Club Atlético Maracaná. On 18 August 2013, he made his first team debut in a 0–0 away draw against Cerro Largo FC.

Ricca scored his first professional goal on 15 February 2014, his team's second in a 2–1 home win against Liverpool FC. He finished his first professional season with 23 matches and three goals, as his side was crowned champions.

Ricca remained a regular starter for Danubio in the following seasons, spending the whole 2014–15 season without being substituted. He also appeared as a starter for the side in both Copa Libertadores and Copa Sudamericana.

=== Málaga ===
On 1 February 2016, Ricca signed a four-and-a-half-year deal with La Liga side Málaga CF. He made his debut there later in the month, in a 1–1 away draw against Real Sociedad.

Rica scored his first goal abroad on 20 April 2016 with a last-minute equalizer in a 1–1 home draw against Rayo Vallecano.

=== Club Brugge ===
On 14 August 2019, Ricca joined Belgian First Division A club Club Brugge on a four-year deal for a fee of €3 million.

=== OH Leuven ===
On 12 August 2022, Ricca moved to another Belgian club, OH Leuven on a three-year contract.

== International career ==
Ricca was named in Uruguay's senior squad for the 2018 FIFA World Cup qualifiers against Venezuela and Colombia in September 2016. He made his debut on 4 June 2017 in a 3–1 friendly loss against Ireland, coming on for Maxi Pereira in the 62nd minute of the game.

== Honours ==
=== Club ===
Danubio

- Uruguayan Primera División: 2013–14

Club Brugge

- Belgian First Division A: 2019–20, 2020–21
- Belgian Super Cup: 2021

Belgrano

- Primera División: 2026 Apertura

=== International ===
Uruguay U23

- Pan American Games: 2015
