= Nicolás Albarracín =

Uruguayan footballer (born 1993)

Personal information
- Full name: Nicolás Gabriel Albarracín Basil
- Date of birth: 11 June 1993 (age 33)
- Place of birth: Montevideo, Uruguay
- Height: 1.77 m (5 ft 10 in)
- Position: Winger

Team information
- Current team: Wuxi Wugo

Youth career
- –2010: Montevideo Wanderers

Senior career*
Years	Team	Apps	(Gls)
2010–2015	Montevideo Wanderers	48	(9)
2013	→ Spezia (loan)	4	(0)
2015–2019	→ Peñarol (loan)	33	(5)
2017	Deportivo Cali	15	(1)
2017–2019	Peñarol	0	(0)
2017–2018	→ Lugo (loan)	26	(1)
2018–2019	→ Montevideo Wanderers (loan)	25	(8)
2019	Montevideo Wanderers	11	(2)
2020	Atlante	2	(0)
2020	Querétaro	2	(0)
2021	Plaza Colonia	10	(0)
2021	→ Patronato (loan)	5	(0)
2022	Real Tomayapo	29	(6)
2023	Montevideo Wanderers	35	(3)
2024	Mannucci	28	(4)
2025	Foshan Nanshi	28	(8)
2026–	Wuxi Wugo	25	(5)

International career
2015	Uruguay U22	5	(1)
Medal record
Representing Uruguay
Men's Football
Pan American Games
Gold medal – first place	2015 Toronto	Team competition
- * Club domestic league appearances and goals as of 31 October 2026

Nicolás Gabriel Albarracín Basil (born 11 June 1993) is an Uruguayan footballer who plays as a right winger for Chinese club Wuxi Wugo. He also holds an Italian passport.

== Club career ==
Born in Montevideo, Albarracín graduated from Montevideo Wanderers F.C.'s youth setup. On 21 November 2010, he played his first match as a professional, coming on as a late substitute in a 1–2 home loss against local rivals Club Atlético River Plate for the Uruguayan Primera División championship.

In January 2013, he was sent on a one-year loan to Italian side Spezia Calcio. He could not play much due to a long injury he suffered and left the club after finishing his contract, staying some months without playing.

== International career ==
Albarracín played various international friendly matches with the Uruguayan U20 team, but was finally removed from the squad selected for the 2013 South American Youth Championship.

In 2015, he was named to participate in the Uruguay U22 squad for the 2015 Pan American Games.

== Career statistics ==
As of match played 8 November 2025

Appearances and goals by club, season and competition
Club	Season	League			National cup		Continental		Other		Total	
Club	Season	Division	Apps	Goals	Apps	Goals	Apps	Goals	Apps	Goals	Apps	Goals
Montevideo Wanderers	2010–11	Uruguayan Primera División	1	0	—		—		—		1	0
Montevideo Wanderers	2011–12	Uruguayan Primera División	0	0	—		—		—		0	0
Montevideo Wanderers	2012–13	Uruguayan Primera División	11	1	—		—		—		11	1
Montevideo Wanderers	2013–14	Uruguayan Primera División	11	5	—		—		—		11	5
Montevideo Wanderers	2014–15	Uruguayan Primera División	25	3	—		8	2	—		33	5
Montevideo Wanderers	Total		48	9	—		8	2	—		56	11
Spezia (loan)	2012–13	Serie B	3	0	—		—		1	0	4	0
Spezia (loan)	2013–14	Serie B	1	0	0	0	—		—		1	0
Spezia (loan)	Total		4	0	0	0	—		1	0	5	0
Peñarol (loan)	2015–16	Uruguayan Primera División	22	2	—		5	1	0	0	27	3
Peñarol (loan)	2016	Uruguayan Primera División	11	3	—		—		—		11	3
Peñarol (loan)	Total		33	5	—		5	1	0	0	38	6
Deportivo Cali	2017	Categoría Primera A	15	1	4	0	1	0	—		20	1
Lugo (loan)	2017–18	Segunda División	26	1	1	0	—		—		27	1
Montevideo Wanderers (loan)	2018	Uruguayan Primera División	13	6	—		—		—		13	6
Montevideo Wanderers (loan)	2019	Uruguayan Primera División	12	2	—		4	0	—		16	2
Montevideo Wanderers (loan)	Total		25	8	—		4	0	—		29	8
Montevideo Wanderers	2019	Uruguayan Primera División	11	2	—		2	0	—		13	2
Atlante	2019–20	Ascenso MX	2	0	—		—		—		2	0
Querétaro	2020–21	Liga MX	2	0	—		—		—		2	0
Plaza Colonia	2021	Uruguayan Primera División	10	0	—		—		—		10	0
Patronato (loan)	2021	Argentine Primera División	5	0	—		—		—		5	0
Real Tomayapo	2022	Bolivian Primera División	29	6	—		—		—		29	6
Montevideo Wanderers	2023	Uruguayan Primera División	35	3	1	0	—		—		36	3
Mannucci	2024	Peruvian Primera División	28	4	—		—		—		28	4
Foshan Nanshi	2025	China League One	28	8	0	0	—		—		28	8
Career total			301	47	6	0	20	3	1	0	328	50

== Honours ==
Uruguay U-23

- Pan American Games:

Champion : 2015
