= Brian Lozano =

Uruguayan footballer (born 1994)

Personal information
- Full name: Brian Avelino Lozano Aparicio
- Date of birth: 23 February 1994 (age 32)
- Place of birth: Montevideo, Uruguay
- Height: 1.67 m (5 ft 6 in)
- Positions: Winger; attacking midfielder

Team information
- Current team: Defensor Sporting
- Number: 7

Youth career
- Tacurú
- Bella Vista
- Defensor Sporting

Senior career*
| Years | Team | Apps | (Gls) |
| 2014–2015 | Defensor Sporting | 36 | (11) |
| 2016–2018 | América | 7 | (0) |
| 2016–2017 | → Nacional (loan) | 25 | (4) |
| 2017–2018 | → Santos Laguna (loan) | 36 | (2) |
| 2018–2022 | Santos Laguna | 96 | (21) |
| 2022 | → Peñarol (loan) | 13 | (1) |
| 2023–2025 | Atlas | 25 | (7) |
| 2025– | Defensor Sporting | 2 | (0) |

International career
| 2015 | Uruguay U22 | 5 | (2) |
| 2015–2019 | Uruguay | 8 | (0) |
Medal record
Representing Uruguay
Men's Football
Pan American Games
| Gold medal – first place | 2015 Toronto | Team competition |
- * Club domestic league appearances and goals as of 1 October 2025

Brian Avelino Lozano Aparicio (born 23 February 1994) is a Uruguayan professional footballer who plays as a winger for Defensor Sporting.

== Club career ==
In July 2016, Lozano joined Nacional on a one-year loan deal from América.

On 13 July 2022, Peñarol announced the signing of Lozano on a one-year loan deal.

In December 2022 Peñarol announced that Santos Laguna, the team owner of Lozano's card, had recalled Brian to send it to Atlas FC on a 3-year long contract.

== International career ==
Lozano is a former Uruguayan youth international. He was part of under-22 team which won gold medal at 2015 Pan American Games.

== Personal life ==
Lozano is the uncle of professional footballer Leandro Lozano.

== Career statistics ==
=== International ===
As of match played 18 November 2019

Appearances and goals by national team and year
| National team | Year | Apps | Goals |
|---|---|---|---|
| Uruguay | 2015 | 2 | 0 |
| Uruguay | 2019 | 6 | 0 |
| Total | | 8 | 0 |

== Honours ==
América

- CONCACAF Champions League: 2015–16

Nacional

- Uruguayan Primera División: 2016

Santos Laguna

- Liga MX: Clausura 2018

Uruguay U22

- Pan American Games: 2015
