= Gastón Faber =

Uruguayan footballer (born 1996)

Personal information
- Full name: Gastón Faber Chevalier
- Date of birth: 21 April 1996 (age 30)
- Place of birth: Montevideo, Uruguay
- Height: 1.75 m (5 ft 9 in)
- Position: Midfielder

Team information
- Current team: Bella Italia

Youth career
- Danubio

Senior career*
Years	Team	Apps	(Gls)
2013–2017	Danubio	22	(1)
2016–2017	→ Racing (loan)	0	(0)
2017	→ Foggia (loan)	1	(0)
2017	→ Racing (loan)	0	(0)
2018	Boston River	4	(0)
2019	Atlético Porteño	?	(2)
2020–2021	Juventud	24	(1)
2022	Tudelano	19	(0)
2022	Juventud	5	(0)
2023–	Bella Italia		

International career
2013	Uruguay U-17	12	(0)
2015	Uruguay U-20	4	(1)
Medal record
Representing Uruguay
Men's Football
Pan American Games
Gold medal – first place	2015 Toronto	Team competition
- * Club domestic league appearances and goals as of 14:46, 2 September 2020 (UTC)

Gastón Faber (born 21 April 1996) is an Uruguayan footballer who plays as a midfielder for Bella Italia.

== Honours ==
Danubio F.C.

Winner

- Uruguayan Primera División: 2013–14

Uruguay U-23

- Pan American Games:

Champion : 2015
