= Marco Bueno =

Mexican footballer (born 1994)

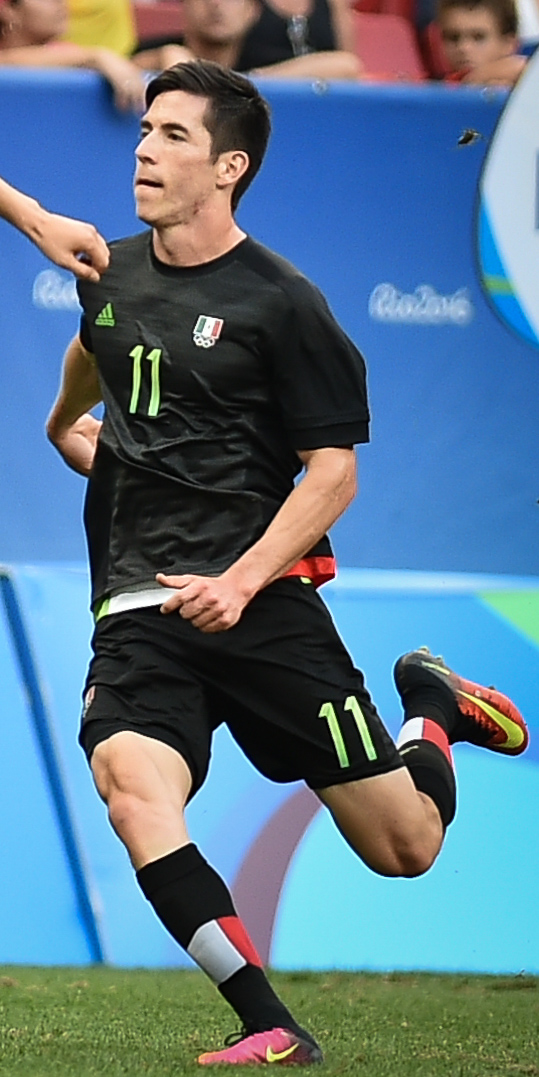
- Bueno with Mexico at the 2016 Summer Olympics

Personal information
- Full name: Marco Antonio Bueno Ontiveros
- Date of birth: 31 March 1994 (age 32)
- Place of birth: Culiacán, Sinaloa, Mexico
- Height: 1.82 m (6 ft 0 in)
- Position: Forward

Youth career
- 2007–2011: Pachuca

Senior career*
Years	Team	Apps	(Gls)
2011–2018	Pachuca	27	(6)
2011	→ León (loan)	1	(0)
2014	→ Tecos (loan)	20	(5)
2014–2015	→ Toluca (loan)	14	(2)
2015–2016	→ León (loan)	13	(1)
2016–2017	→ Guadalajara (loan)	11	(2)
2017	→ Monterrey (loan)	8	(0)
2018	→ Everton (loan)	16	(4)
2019	HJK	9	(0)
2020	Oriente Petrolero	17	(4)
2021	Andijon	0	(0)
2021–2022	Comunicaciones	21	(2)

International career
2011	Mexico U17	8	(1)
2013	Mexico U20	9	(3)
2013	Mexico U23	20	(5)
2015	Mexico	1	(0)
Medal record
Men's football
Representing Mexico
Pan American Games
Silver medal – second place	2015 Toronto	Team
Olympic Qualifying Championship
Winner	2015 United States
CONCACAF U-20 Championship
Winner	2013 Mexico	Team
FIFA U-17 World Cup
Winner	2011 Mexico	Team
- * Club domestic league appearances and goals as of 21 February 2022

Marco Antonio Bueno Ontiveros (born 31 March 1994) is a Mexican former professional footballer who played as a forward.

== Club career ==
=== CF Pachuca ===
Born in Culiacán, Bueno started his career in the youth system of CF Pachuca. He was loaned to Leon during the Liga Ascenso Clausura 2011 season. He only made one appearance as a starter, but was subbed off after 58 minutes without having scored. He returned to Pachuca at the end of the season. He made his official debut for CF Pachuca on 8 October 2011 against Chiapas, as sub in the 83rd minute for Mauro Cejas on the 12th matchday of the Apertura 2011.

In the Clausura 2012 Bueno played 2 minutes in the 0–0 draw against Santos Laguna on the first matchday of the tournament on 7 January 2012. Bueno scored his first two goals the following week against Puebla on the 2nd match of the tournament.

==== Estudiantes Tecos ====
Bueno was loaned out to Estudiantes Tecos from CF Pachuca on 1 January 2014. He went on to help Estudiantes Tecos win the playoffs and enter a chance to get promoted to top division, Liga MX, but lost the promotion game against Leones Negros on penalties.

==== Deportivo Toluca F.C. ====
Bueno was loaned from CF Pachuca to Toluca. He has played in 2 friendly preseason matches against Mineros De Zacatecas which resulted as a loss. The next pre-season friendly he was in was against Queretaro FC which ended up as a tie. Bueno made his league debut for Toluca being substituted in for Richard Ortiz in the 73 minute against Club Leon in a 2–3 defeat.

==== Club León ====
Pachuca loaned Bueno back to Leon, this time in Liga MX for the 2015–16 season. He was given the number 11 shirt. On 12 September, Bueno came off the bench at minute 57 and scored his first goal with Leon at minute 75 losing to Chiapas.

==== Chivas ====
On 25 May 2016, Bueno signed on a one-year loan with Guadalajara for the 2016–17 season.

==== Monterrey ====
In June 2017, Bueno joined Monterrey on loan.

==== Everton ====
On 11 January 2018, Bueno joined Chilean club Everton on a one-year loan.

=== HJK Helsinki ===
After not finding a spot in Pachuca for the Clausura 2019, Bueno joined HJK on trial on 21 March 2019 as a free agent. Bueno played two days later and scored on his debut in a friendly match. On March 26, 2019, he signed a 1+1 contract.

=== Oriente Petrolero ===
On 24 December 2019, Bueno signed for Bolivian Primera División club Oriente Petrolero.

=== Andijon ===
On 11 March 2021, Bueno signed for Uzbekistani club Andijon on a free transfer. Issues with his paperwork meant that he did not play for the club.

=== Comunicaciones ===
On 19 June 2021, Bueno joined Guatemalan club Comunicaciones. He won the CONCACAF League with the club, after beating Motagua 6–3 on aggregate.

== International career ==
=== Mexico U-17 ===
Bueno was selected by manager Raul Gutierrez to compete in the 2011 FIFA U-17 World Cup. He would compete in every match scoring only 1 goal against Panama in the round of 16. He would eventually go on and win the tournament at the Estadio Azteca becoming the first home nation to win it on home soil.

=== Mexico U-19 ===
Bueno was selected by Sergio Alamaguer to participate in the 2013 FIFA U-20 World Cup.

=== Mexico national team ===
On 15 April 2015, Bueno made his debut with the Mexico national team in a friendly game against the United States.

== Career statistics ==
=== Club ===
As of 31 January 2024

Appearances and goals by club, season and competition
Club	Season	League			Cup		Continental		Total	
Club	Season	Division	Apps	Goals	Apps	Goals	Apps	Goals	Apps	Goals
Leon (loan)	2010–11	Liga de Ascenso	1	0	—		—		1	0
Leon (loan)	Total		1	0	—		—		1	0
Pachuca	2011–12	Mexican Primera División	16	4	—		—		16	4
Pachuca	2012–13	Liga MX	6	1	3	0	—		9	1
Pachuca	2013–14	Liga MX	5	1	4	1	—		9	2
Pachuca	Total		27	6	7	1	—		34	7
Tecos (loan)	2013–14	Ascenso MX	20	5	4	0	—		24	5
Toluca (loan)	2014–15	Liga MX	14	2	5	2	—		19	4
Leon (loan)	2015–16	Liga MX	13	1	9	3	—		22	4
Guadalajara (loan)	2016–17	Liga MX	10	2	2	0	—		12	2
Monterrey (loan)	2016–17	Liga MX	2	0	3	0	—		5	0
Monterrey (loan)	2017–18	Liga MX	3	0	3	0	—		6	0
Monterrey (loan)	Total		5	0	6	0	—		11	0
Everton (loan)	2018	Chilean Primera División	16	4	—		2 (Note: Appearances in Copa Sudamericana)	0	18	4
HJK	2019	Veikkausliiga	9	0	—		0	0	9	0
Oriente Petrolero	2020	Bolivian Primera División	17	4	—		2	0	19	4
Comunicaciones	2021–22	Liga Nacional de Fútbol de Guatemala	21	2	—		9 (Note: Appearances in CONCACAF League)	0	30	2
Career total			153	26	35	6	13	0	199	26

=== International ===
As of match played 16 April 2015

National team	Year	Apps	Goals
Mexico	2015	1	0
Total		1	0

== Honours ==
Tecos

- Ascenso MX: Clausura 2014

Guadalajara

- Supercopa MX: 2016

Monterrey

- Copa MX: Apertura 2017

Comunicaciones

- CONCACAF League: 2021

Mexico Youth

- FIFA U-17 World Cup: 2011
- CONCACAF U-20 Championship: 2013
- Central American and Caribbean Games: 2014
- Pan American Silver Medal: 2015
- CONCACAF Olympic Qualifying Championship: 2015

Individual

- Mexican Primera División Rookie of the Tournament: Clausura 2012
