= Guillermo de Amores =

Uruguayan footballer (born 1994)

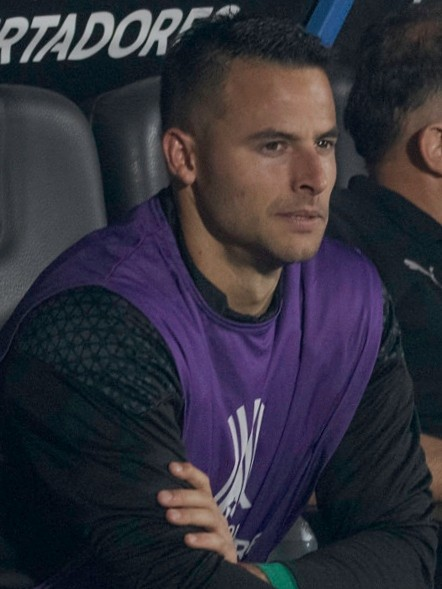

Personal information
- Full name: Guillermo Rafael de Amores Ravelo
- Date of birth: 19 October 1994 (age 32)
- Place of birth: San Jacinto, Uruguay
- Height: 1.86 m (6 ft 1 in)
- Position: Goalkeeper

Team information
- Current team: Millonarios
- Number: 12

Youth career
- Liverpool Montevideo

Senior career*
| Years | Team | Apps | (Gls) |
| 2011–2017 | Liverpool Montevideo | 92 | (0) |
| 2018–2020 | Boston River | 0 | (0) |
| 2018–2019 | → Fluminense (loan) | 0 | (0) |
| 2020 | Fénix | 14 | (0) |
| 2021–2022 | Deportivo Cali | 54 | (0) |
| 2022–2023 | Lanús | 3 | (0) |
| 2023 | → Sporting Gijón (loan) | 1 | (0) |
| 2023–2025 | Peñarol | 22 | (0) |
| 2025- | Millonarios | 5 | (0) |

International career^{‡}
| 2010–2011 | Uruguay U17 | 11 | (0) |
| 2012–2013 | Uruguay U20 | 24 | (0) |
| 2015 | Uruguay U22 | 5 | (0) |
| 2024– | Uruguay local | 1 | (0) |
Medal record
Representing Uruguay
Men's Football
Pan American Games
| Gold medal – first place | 2015 Toronto | Team competition |
FIFA U-20 World Cup
| Runner-up | 2013 Turkey |
South American U-20 Championship
| Third place | 2013 Argentina |
FIFA U-17 World Cup
| Runner-up | 2011 Mexico |
South American U-17 Championship
| Runner-up | 2011 Ecuador |
- * Club domestic league appearances and goals as of 12 December 2025 ‡ National team caps and goals as of 1 September 2024

Guillermo Rafael de Amores Ravelo (born 19 October 1994) is a Uruguayan professional footballer who plays as a goalkeeper for Colombian Categoría Primera A club Millonarios.

== Club career ==
De Amores is a youth academy graduate of Liverpool Montevideo. He made his professional debut on 4 December 2011 in a 1–0 league defeat against Nacional.

De Amores joined Brazilian club Fluminense in 2018, on loan from Boston River. In 2020, he returned to his home country with Fénix, before moving to Deportivo Cali in the following year.

On 19 July 2022, de Amores joined Argentine Primera División club Lanús on a contract until December 2026. The following 27 January, he was loaned to Spanish Segunda División side Sporting de Gijón until the end of the season.

== International career ==
De Amores has represented Uruguay at various youth levels. He was part of Uruguayan squads which finished as runners-up at the 2011 FIFA U-17 World Cup and the 2013 FIFA U-20 World Cup. He was named as the best goalkeeper in the latter tournament. In July 2015, he won gold medal with Uruguay's under-22 team at the 2015 Pan American Games.

On 21 October 2022, de Amores was named in Uruguay's 55-man preliminary squad for the 2022 FIFA World Cup. However, he was not included in the final squad, which was announced three weeks later. On 1 September 2024, he made his debut for the Uruguay local national team in a 1–1 draw against Guatemala.

== Career statistics ==
=== Club ===
As of match played 16 December 2023

Appearances and goals by club, season and competition
| Club | Season | League | | | National cup | | Continental | | Other | | Total | |
| Club | Season | Division | Apps | Goals | Apps | Goals | Apps | Goals | Apps | Goals | Apps | Goals |
|---|---|---|---|---|---|---|---|---|---|---|---|---|
| Liverpool Montevideo | 2011–12 | Uruguayan Primera División | 1 | 0 | — | | — | | — | | 1 | 0 |
| Liverpool Montevideo | 2012–13 | Uruguayan Primera División | 2 | 0 | — | | 0 | 0 | — | | 2 | 0 |
| Liverpool Montevideo | 2013–14 | Uruguayan Primera División | 29 | 0 | — | | — | | — | | 29 | 0 |
| Liverpool Montevideo | 2014–15 | Uruguayan Primera División | 16 | 0 | — | | — | | — | | 16 | 0 |
| Liverpool Montevideo | 2015–16 | Uruguayan Primera División | 2 | 0 | — | | — | | — | | 2 | 0 |
| Liverpool Montevideo | 2016 | Uruguayan Primera División | 14 | 0 | — | | — | | — | | 14 | 0 |
| Liverpool Montevideo | 2017 | Uruguayan Primera División | 28 | 0 | — | | 2 | 0 | — | | 30 | 0 |
| Liverpool Montevideo | Total | | 92 | 0 | — | | 2 | 0 | — | | 94 | 0 |
| Fluminense (loan) | 2018 | Série A | 0 | 0 | 0 | 0 | 0 | 0 | — | | 0 | 0 |
| Fénix | 2020 | Uruguayan Primera División | 14 | 0 | — | | 3 | 0 | — | | 17 | 0 |
| Deportivo Cali | 2021 | Categoría Primera A | 46 | 0 | 6 | 0 | 2 | 0 | — | | 54 | 0 |
| Deportivo Cali | 2022 | Categoría Primera A | 8 | 0 | 2 | 0 | 8 | 0 | 2 | 0 | 20 | 0 |
| Deportivo Cali | Total | | 54 | 0 | 8 | 0 | 10 | 0 | 2 | 0 | 74 | 0 |
| Lanús | 2022 | Argentine Primera División | 3 | 0 | — | | — | | — | | 3 | 0 |
| Sporting Gijón (loan) | 2022–23 | Segunda División | 1 | 0 | — | | — | | — | | 1 | 0 |
| Peñarol | 2023 | Uruguayan Primera División | 18 | 0 | — | | — | | — | | 18 | 0 |
| Career total | | | 321 | 49 | 11 | 5 | 6 | 2 | 4 | 1 | 342 | 57 |

== Honours ==
=== International ===
Uruguay U-17

- FIFA U-17 World Cup: Runner-Up 2011

Uruguay U-20

- FIFA U-20 World Cup: Runner-Up 2013

Uruguay U-23

- Pan American Games: 2015

=== Individual ===
- FIFA U-20 World Cup Golden Glove: 2013
