= Fabricio Formiliano =

Uruguayan footballer (born 1993)

Personal information
- Full name: Fabricio Orosmán Formiliano Duarte
- Date of birth: 14 January 1993 (age 33)
- Place of birth: Salto, Uruguay
- Height: 1.85 m (6 ft 1 in)
- Position: Centre-back

Team information
- Current team: Montevideo Wanderers

Senior career*
Years	Team	Apps	(Gls)
2011–2017	Danubio	86	(5)
2016–2017	→ Newell's Old Boys (loan)	17	(0)
2017–2021	Peñarol	113	(14)
2021–2023	Necaxa	47	(1)
2023–2024	San Lorenzo	0	(0)
2024	Montevideo Wanderers	19	(2)
2024–2025	Universidad de Chile	10	(0)
2025	Unión Española	11	(0)
2026–	Montevideo Wanderers	0	(0)

International career^{‡}
- Uruguay U17
2013	Uruguay U20	7	(1)
2015	Uruguay U22	4	(1)
Medal record
Representing Uruguay
Men's Football
Pan American Games
Gold medal – first place	2015 Toronto	Team competition
- * Club domestic league appearances and goals as of 15 December 2025 ‡ National team caps and goals as of 27 July 2021

Fabricio Orosmán Formiliano (born 14 January 1993) is a Uruguayan professional footballer who plays as a centre-back for Montevideo Wanderers.

== Career ==
In the second half of 2024, Formiliano moved to Chile and signed with Universidad de Chile. He switched to Unión Española in July 2025.

Back to Uruguay, Formiliano signed with Montevideo Wanderers in December 2025.

== Honours ==
Danubio

- Uruguayan Primera División: 2013–14

Peñarol

- Uruguayan Primera División: 2017, 2018

Uruguay U-23

- Pan American Games:

Champion : 2015
