= Andrés Schetino =

Uruguayan footballer (born 1994)

Personal information
- Full name: Edgardo Andrés Schetino Yancev
- Date of birth: 26 May 1994 (age 32)
- Place of birth: Montevideo, Uruguay
- Height: 1.83 m (6 ft 0 in)
- Position: Midfielder

Team information
- Current team: Cerrito

Youth career
- Fénix

Senior career*
Years	Team	Apps	(Gls)
2013–2016	Fénix	53	(3)
2016–2019	Fiorentina	0	(0)
2016	→ Livorno (loan)	0	(0)
2016–2017	→ Sevilla B (loan)	20	(0)
2017–2018	→ Esbjerg fB (loan)	19	(1)
2018–2019	→ Cosenza (loan)	4	(0)
2019–2023	Fénix	86	(4)
2023–2024	Bellinzona	21	(0)
2024–2026	Fénix	32	(1)
2026–	Cerrito	0	(0)

International career
2012	Uruguay U20	1	(0)
2015	Uruguay U22	4	(1)
Medal record
Representing Uruguay
Men's Football
Pan American Games
Gold medal – first place	2015 Toronto	Team competition
- * Club domestic league appearances and goals as of 13 March 2026

Edgardo Andrés Schetino Yancev (born 26 May 1994) is a Uruguayan footballer who plays as a central midfielder for Uruguayan Segunda División club Cerrito.

== Club career ==
=== Fénix ===
Born in Montevideo, Schetino is a youth exponent from Club Atlético Fénix. On 17 August 2013 he made his professional – and Primera División – debut, starting in a 1–2 home loss against El Tanque Sisley.

Schetino scored his first goal as a professional on 29 March 2015, but in a 1–2 home loss against River Plate. He added another on 6 June, in a 3–0 home win against Cerro.

=== Fiorentina ===
In November 2015, Schetino agreed to a move to Fiorentina for a fee of €3.5 million. He signed a contract with Viola on 22 January 2016, being loaned to Livorno six days later.

On 29 July 2016, after making no appearances during the second half of the season, Schetino signed a one-year loan deal with Sevilla Atlético, newly promoted to Segunda División.

On 9 August 2018, Schetino joined to Serie B club Cosenza on loan until 30 June 2019.

== Honours ==
Uruguay U23

- Pan American Games: 2015
