= Luis López (footballer, born August 1993) =

Mexican footballer

Personal information
- Full name: Luis Alberto López López
- Date of birth: 25 August 1993 (age 33)
- Place of birth: Guadalupe, Nuevo León, Mexico
- Height: 1.91 m (6 ft 3 in)
- Position: Defender

Team information
- Current team: Municipal Pérez Zeledón
- Number: 3

Youth career
- Monterrey

Senior career*
Years	Team	Apps	(Gls)
2013–2017	Monterrey	18	(1)
2017–2021	Juárez	61	(0)
2021–2024	UAT	87	(1)
2024	Atlético Morelia	10	(0)
2025–	Municipal Pérez Zeledón	0	(0)

International career
2015–2016	Mexico U23	3	(0)
Medal record
Men's football
Representing Mexico
Pan American Games
Silver medal – second place	2015 Toronto	Team
Olympic Qualifying Championship
Winner	2015 United States
- * Club domestic league appearances and goals as of 28 November 2024

Luis Alberto López López (Note: In this Spanish name, the first or paternal surname is López and the second or maternal family name is López.) (born 25 August 1993) is a Mexican professional footballer who plays as a defender.

== Honours ==
Mexico U23

- Pan American Silver Medal: 2015
- CONCACAF Olympic Qualifying Championship: 2015
