= Jordan Silva =

Mexican footballer (born 1994)

Personal information
- Full name: Jordan Jesús Silva Díaz
- Date of birth: 30 August 1994 (age 32)
- Place of birth: Matehuala, San Luis Potosí, Mexico
- Height: 1.84 m (6 ft 0 in)
- Position: Centre-back

Team information
- Current team: Asteras Tripolis
- Number: 32

Senior career*
Years	Team	Apps	(Gls)
2014–2017	Toluca	57	(1)
2017–2019	Cruz Azul	10	(0)
2019–2022	Tijuana	20	(0)
2021–2022	→ América (loan)	21	(0)
2022	Querétaro	13	(1)
2023–2024	Cruz Azul	4	(0)
2023–2024	→ Atlético San Luis (loan)	15	(0)
2024–2025	OFI Crete	22	(0)
2025–2026	Tlaxcala	23	(4)
2026–	Asteras Tripolis	4	(0)

International career^{‡}
2015–2016	Mexico U23	11	(2)
2016–2021	Mexico	3	(1)
Medal record
Representing Mexico
Men's football
Olympic Qualifying Championship
Winner	2015 United States
- * Club domestic league appearances and goals as of 20 September 2026 ‡ National team caps and goals as of 8 December 2021

Jordan Jesús Silva Díaz (Note: In this Spanish name, the first or paternal surname is Silva and the second or maternal family name is Díaz.) (born 30 August 1994) is a Mexican professional footballer who plays as a centre-back for Super League Greece club Asteras Tripolis.

== Club career ==
=== Toluca ===
On 13 April 2014, Silva made his professional debut against León.

=== Tijuana ===
In May 2019 it was confirmed, that Silva had joined Tijuana.

=== Asteras Tripolis ===
On 3 July 2026, Silva signed with Asteras Tripolis.

== International career ==
=== Youth ===
On September 18, 2015, Silva was selected by coach Raúl Gutiérrez to play in the 2015 CONCACAF Men's Olympic Qualifying Championship.

=== Senior ===
Silva got his first call up to the senior national team for matches against New Zealand and Panama in October 2016. On 8 December 2021, he scored his first goal for Mexico in a friendly match against Chile.

== Career statistics ==
=== International ===
As of match played 8 December 2021

National team	Year	Apps	Goals
Mexico	2016	2	0
Mexico	2021	1	1
Total		3	1

=== International goals ===
Scores and results list Mexico's goal tally first.

No.	Date	Venue	Opponent	Score	Result	Competition
1	8 December 2021	Q2 Stadium, Austin, United States	Chile	2–1	2–2	Friendly

== Honours ==
Cruz Azul

- Copa MX: Apertura 2018

Mexico U23

- Pan American Silver Medal: 2015
- CONCACAF Olympic Qualifying Championship: 2015

Individual

- CONCACAF Olympic Qualifying Championship Best XI: 2015
