= Junior Arias =

Uruguayan footballer (born 1993)

Personal information
- Full name: Junior Gabriel Arias Cáceres
- Date of birth: May 17, 1993 (age 33)
- Place of birth: Montevideo, Uruguay
- Height: 1.78 m (5 ft 10 in)
- Position: Forward

Team information
- Current team: Rangers

Youth career
- 2010–2013: Liverpool Montevideo

Senior career*
Years	Team	Apps	(Gls)
2013–2016	Liverpool Montevideo	56	(36)
2014	→ El Tanque Sisley (loan)	15	(6)
2016–2017	Peñarol	36	(10)
2017–2023	Talleres	56	(11)
2019–2020	→ Banfield (loan)	18	(2)
2020–2021	→ Patronato (loan)	45	(7)
2022	→ Barracas Central (loan)	14	(0)
2022	→ Atenas (loan)	11	(2)
2023	→ The Strongest (loan)	29	(9)
2024–2025	San Martín Tucumán	41	(12)
2025	→ Palestino (loan)	28	(6)
2026	Aldosivi	11	(0)
2026–	Rangers	0	(0)

International career
2015	Uruguay U23	4	(0)
Medal record
Representing Uruguay
Men's Football
Pan American Games
Gold medal – first place	2015 Toronto	Team competition
- * Club domestic league appearances and goals as of 17:37, 11 May 2026 (UTC)

Junior Gabriel Arias Cáceres (born 17 May 1993) is a Uruguayan footballer who plays as a forward for Chilean club Rangers de Talca.

== Career ==
Arias started his career with Liverpool Montevideo in 2013.

In 2025, Arias moved to Chile and signed with Palestino.

Back to Argentina, Arias joined Aldosivi in 2026. He moved back to Chile with Rangers de Talca for the second half of the year.
