= Juan Diego Li =

Peruvian footballer (born 1995)

Personal information
- Full name: Juan Diego Antonio Li Naranjo
- Date of birth: 16 February 1995 (age 31)
- Place of birth: Lima, Peru
- Height: 1.75 m (5 ft 9 in)
- Position: Right back

Team information
- Current team: UTC Cajamarca
- Number: 30

Youth career
- 2003–2007: Cantolao
- 2008–2009: Regatas Lima
- 2010–2013: Esther Grande

Senior career*
Years	Team	Apps	(Gls)
2013–2016	Universidad San Martín	0	(0)
2013–2014	→ Pacífico (loan)		
2014	→ FBC Melgar (loan)	1	(0)
2014–2016	→ Alianza Lima (loan)	6	(0)
2016–2017	Vejle Boldklub	0	(0)
2017	Alianza Lima	0	(0)
2018	UTC Cajamarca	4	(0)

International career^{‡}
2015	Peru U22	3	(0)
Medal record
Alianza Lima
Runner-up	Torneo del Inca	2015
Winner	Torneo Descentralizado	2017
- * Club domestic league appearances and goals as of 21:28, 22 July 2018 (UTC) ‡ National team caps and goals as of 21:28, 22 July 2018 (UTC)

Juan Diego Antonio Li Naranjo (born 16 February 1995), commonly known as Juan Diego Li, is a Peruvian football player who most recently played for UTC Cajamarca.

== Club career ==
In August 2016, Li joined Vejle Boldklub. However, after failing to make an appearance for the Danish side, he joined Alianza Lima of his native Peru in December of the same year.

== Career statistics ==
=== Club ===
As of 22 July 2018.

Club	Season	League			Cup		Continental		Other		Total	
Club	Season	Division	Apps	Goals	Apps	Goals	Apps	Goals	Apps	Goals	Apps	Goals
FBC Melgar (loan)	2014	Torneo Descentralizado	1	0	0	0	–		0	0	1	0
Alianza Lima	2015	Torneo Descentralizado	6	0	6 (Note: Appearances in the Torneo del Inca)	0	–		0	0	12	0
UTC	2018	Torneo Descentralizado	4	0	0	0	–		0	0	4	0
Career total			11	0	6	0	0	0	0	0	17	0
