= Uvaldo Luna =

Mexican football player (born 1993)

Personal information
- Full name: Uvaldo Luna Martínez
- Date of birth: 21 December 1993 (age 32)
- Place of birth: Channelview, Texas, United States
- Height: 1.76 m (5 ft 9 in)
- Position: Midfielder

Youth career
- 2008–2013: Tigres UANL

Senior career*
Years	Team	Apps	(Gls)
2013–2018	Tigres UANL	2	(0)
2016–2017	→ Patriotas (loan)	41	(8)
2017	→ Atlas (loan)	7	(0)
2018	→ Once Caldas (loan)	12	(0)
2019	Unión Magdalena	17	(0)
2020	Colorado Springs Switchbacks	13	(2)

International career
2013	Mexico U20	6	(1)
2015	Mexico U23	8	(0)
Medal record
Representing Mexico
First place	CONCACAF U-20 Championship	2013 Mexico
- * Club domestic league appearances and goals as of October 5, 2020

Uvaldo Luna Martínez (born 21 December 1993) is a Mexican professional footballer who plays as a midfielder.

== Personal life ==
Luna was born in the state of Texas in Channelview to Mexican parents. Luna has both Mexican and American nationality therefore having Dual-citizenship being able to play for either Mexico or the U.S national team.

== Club career ==
=== Youth ===
Luna is a graduate of the Tigres UANL Youth Academy and made his senior team debut in 2013 against Cruz Azul Hidalgo in a Cup match. Uvaldo took part in the Copa Libertadores with Tigres in 2015.

=== Tigres UANL ===
Shortly after returning from the U-20 World Cup, Uvaldo made his first-team debut with Tigres in a Copa MX match against Cruz Azul Hidalgo on July 24, 2013, where Tigres lost, 1–0.

After several time in the affiliate teams Uvaldo Luna made his league debut January 17, 2015, against Club León, playing as centre forward, and was subbed out in the 28th minute of the match for Israel Jimenez.

== International career ==
=== U.S & Mexico National Team ===
Luna has represented Mexico and the United States in several youth categories. He was part of the Mexican team that participated in the 2013 FIFA U-20 World Cup in Turkey, where he scored a goal against Mali in the final minutes of the match.

=== United States U-20 ===
In early January 2012, Uvaldo Luna was called by coach Tab Ramos to the US U-20 training camp, but did not make an official debut for the team. Uvaldo Luna had also been with the US U-18 national team before in 2010.

=== Mexico U-20 ===
==== 2013 CONCACAF U20 qualifying tournament ====
In May 2012, Luna formed part of the U-20 national team under coach Sergio Almager, He played in every match and Mexico won the title.

==== 2013 FIFA U20 World Cup ====
Uvaldo was part of the Mexican team that participated in the World Cup held in Turkey. Uvaldo played in all three group stage matches and scored a goal against Mali in the final minutes of the match securing Mexico a spot in the quarter-finals after a 4–1 win. Mexico would eventually be eliminated by Spain in the quarter-finals.

=== Mexico U-23 ===
==== 2015 Pan American Games ====
Luna participated in the 2015 Pan American games held in Toronto where he made three appearances including one in the semi-final.

==== 2015 Toulon Tournament ====
Uvaldo participated in the 2013 and 2015 editions of the Toulon Tournament with Mexico.

== Career statistics ==
=== Club ===
As of match played 15 September 2016

Club	Season	League			Cup		Continental		Total	
Club	Season	Division	Apps	Goals	Apps	Goals	Apps	Goals	Apps	Goals
Mexico		League			Copa MX		Continental		Total	
Tigres UANL	2013–14	Liga MX	—		5	0	—		5	0
Tigres UANL	2014–15	Liga MX	1	0	2	1	1 (Note: 2015 Copa Libertadores)	0	4	1
Tigres UANL	2015–16	Liga MX	1	0	—		2 (Note: 2015–16 CONCACAF Champions League)	0	3	0
Tigres UANL	Total		2	0	7	1	3	0	12	1
Colombia		League			Copa Colombia		Continental		Total	
Patriotas FC (loan)	2016	Primera A	11	1	4	0	—		15	1
Patriotas FC (loan)	Total		11	1	4	0	—		15	1
Career total			13	1	11	1	3	0	27	2

== Honours ==
Tigres UANL

- Liga MX: Apertura 2015
- Copa MX: Clausura 2014
- Copa Libertadores Runner Up: 2015

Mexico U20

- CONCACAF U-20 Championship: 2013
- Central American and Caribbean Games: 2014

Mexico U23

- Pan American Silver Medal: 2015
