= Clayton (footballer, born 1995) =

Brazilian footballer

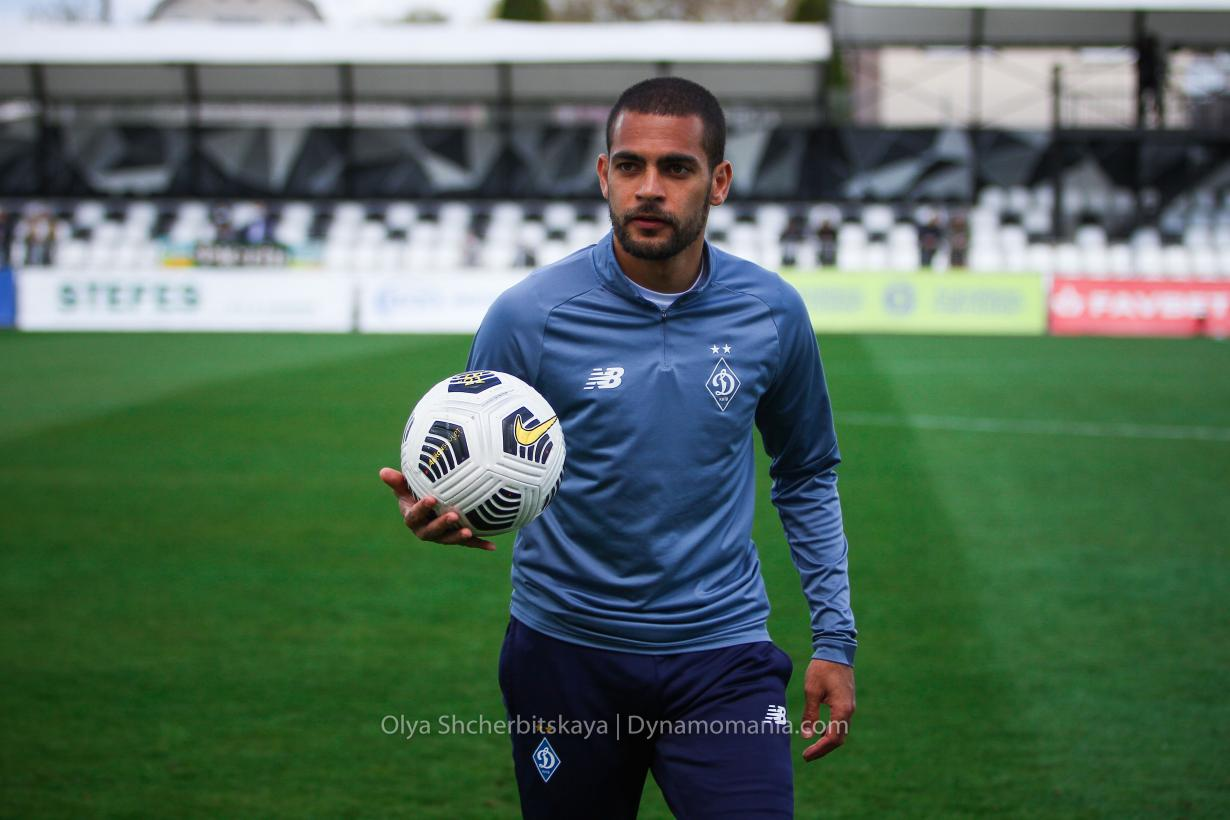

Personal information
- Full name: Clayton da Silveira da Silva
- Date of birth: 23 October 1995 (age 31)
- Place of birth: Rio de Janeiro, Brazil
- Height: 1.75 m (5 ft 9 in)
- Position: Forward

Team information
- Current team: Pattani
- Number: 8

Youth career
- 2007–2013: Figueirense

Senior career*
Years	Team	Apps	(Gls)
2012–2016	Figueirense	96	(27)
2016–2020	Atlético Mineiro	62	(9)
2017	→ Corinthians (loan)	14	(2)
2018–2019	→ Bahia (loan)	19	(2)
2019	→ Vasco da Gama (loan)	7	(0)
2020–2021	Dynamo Kyiv	1	(0)
2021–2022	CSA	8	(0)
2023	Londrina	3	(0)
2024	Hercílio Luz	10	(1)
2024–2025	Perak	22	(8)
2025	Diamond Harbour	0	(0)
2026	Persis Solo	0	(0)
2026	→ PSMS Medan (loan)	9	(1)
2026–	Pattani	0	(0)

International career
2015	Brazil U23	6	(4)
Medal record
Representing Brazil
Men's Football
Pan American Games
Bronze medal – third place	2015 Toronto	Team competition
- * Club domestic league appearances and goals as of 2 May 2026

Clayton da Silveira da Silva (born 23 October 1995), simply known as Clayton, is a Brazilian professional footballer who plays as a forward for Thai League 1 club Pattani.

== Club career ==
Born in Rio de Janeiro, Clayton joined Figueirense's youth setup in 2007, aged 12. On 3 November 2012 he made his first team – and Série A – debut, coming on as a late substitute in a 0–1 away loss against Flamengo.

After appearing with the under-20s, Cleyton was definitely promoted to the main squad in 2014. On 3 August 2014 he scored his first professional goal, netting the second in a 3–0 home win against Sport Recife.

On 28 September Cleyton netted a brace in a 3–1 home success over Palmeiras. He finished the campaign with 22 appearances and five goals, as his side avoided relegation.

Clayton scored seven league goals during the 2015 season, including a brace against Flamengo, as his side again narrowly avoided the drop. He finished the year with 17 goals in 56 matches.

On 23 February 2016, Clayton moved to fellow league team Atlético Mineiro.

On 23 March 2017, Clayton was loaned to Corinthians until the end of the season, but returned to Atlético in August.

On 10 August 2018, Clayton joined Bahia on a year-long loan. He returned to Atlético in August 2019, before joining Vasco da Gama on loan for the remainder of that year.

On 25 June 2020, Clayton mutually terminated his contract with Atlético.

== International goals ==
=== U22 ===
#	Date	Venue	Opponent	Score	Result	Competition
1	12 July 2015	Hamilton Pan Am Soccer Stadium, Hamilton	Canada U-22	3–0	4–1	2015 Pan American Games
2	16 July 2015	Hamilton Pan Am Soccer Stadium, Hamilton	Peru U-22	2–0	4–0	2015 Pan American Games
3	20 July 2015	Hamilton Pan Am Soccer Stadium, Hamilton	Panama U-22	3–0	3–3	2015 Pan American Games
4	23 July 2015	Hamilton Pan Am Soccer Stadium, Hamilton	Uruguay U-22	1–0	1–2	2015 Pan American Games

== Honours ==
Figueirense

- Campeonato Catarinense: 2014, 2015
