= Ignacio González (footballer, born 1993) =

Uruguayan footballer

Personal information
- Full name: Juan Ignacio González Brazeiro
- Date of birth: 5 November 1993 (age 33)
- Place of birth: Paysandú, Uruguay
- Height: 1.75 m (5 ft 9 in)
- Positions: Left midfielder; right midfielder

Youth career
- Danubio

Senior career*
| Years | Team | Apps | (Gls) |
| 2012–2018 | Danubio | 159 | (15) |
| 2019 | Defensa y Justicia | 0 | (0) |
| 2019–2020 | San Martín T. | 6 | (0) |
| 2020 | Plaza Colonia | 7 | (0) |
| 2020–2021 | Deportivo La Coruña | 11 | (0) |
| 2021 | Apollon Larissa | | |
| 2022–2023 | Central Español | 13 | (1) |
| 2023 | Paysandú | | |
| 2023–2024 | Estudiantil Sanducero FC | | |
| 2024 | Paysandú | | |

International career
| 2015 | Uruguay U22 | 5 | (0) |
- * Club domestic league appearances and goals as of 04:37, 19 November 2026 (UTC)

Juan Ignacio González Brazeiro (born 5 November 1993) is a Uruguayan professional footballer who plays as a midfielder.

== Club career ==
González began with Danubio. He made the opening appearances of his senior career in November 2012, featuring in Uruguayan Primera División defeats to Central Español, River Plate and Bella Vista. In the following May, González netted his first goal during a draw in the return fixture with the aforementioned River Plate. He remained with the club for a total of seven seasons, scoring fifteen goals across one hundred and seventy-three matches; notably winning the 2013–14 title. He had a trial with Fluminense in August 2018. In January 2019, González was signed by Defensa y Justicia of the Argentine Primera División.

González didn't appear competitively for Defensa, departing eight months later to San Martín of Primera B Nacional. He made his debut in a 2–2 draw away to Chacarita Juniors on 17 September 2020, which was the first of six appearances for the club. In August 2020, González returned to Uruguayan football with Plaza Colonia. He featured seven times in the Primera División across the next month, prior to leaving to head to Spain with Segunda División B side Deportivo La Coruña on 18 September.

== International career ==
In 2015, González was called up by the Uruguay U22s for the Pan American Games in Canada. He participated in all five matches of the tournament, with Uruguay defeating Mexico in the final.

== Career statistics ==
As of 18 December 2020.

Club statistics
| Club | Season | League | | | Cup | | League Cup | | Continental | | Other | | Total | |
| Club | Season | Division | Apps | Goals | Apps | Goals | Apps | Goals | Apps | Goals | Apps | Goals | Apps | Goals |
|---|---|---|---|---|---|---|---|---|---|---|---|---|---|---|
| Danubio | 2012–13 | Uruguayan Primera División | 11 | 1 | — | | — | | 0 | 0 | 0 | 0 | 11 | 1 |
| Danubio | 2013–14 | Uruguayan Primera División | 27 | 4 | — | | — | | — | | 3 (Note: Appearance(s) in the Uruguayan Primera División play-offs) | 0 | 30 | 4 |
| Danubio | 2014–15 | Uruguayan Primera División | 26 | 3 | — | | — | | 8 (Note: Appearance(s) in the Copa Libertadores and Copa Sudamericana) | 0 | 0 | 0 | 34 | 3 |
| Danubio | 2015–16 | Uruguayan Primera División | 21 | 0 | — | | — | | 2 (Note: Appearance(s) in the Copa Sudamericana) | 0 | 0 | 0 | 23 | 0 |
| Danubio | 2016 | Uruguayan Primera División | 12 | 1 | — | | — | | — | | 0 | 0 | 12 | 1 |
| Danubio | 2017 | Uruguayan Primera División | 27 | 3 | — | | — | | 2 | 0 | 0 | 0 | 29 | 3 |
| Danubio | 2018 | Uruguayan Primera División | 32 | 3 | — | | — | | 2 | 0 | 0 | 0 | 34 | 3 |
| Danubio | Total | | 156 | 15 | — | | — | | 14 | 0 | 3 | 0 | 173 | 15 |
| Defensa y Justicia | 2018–19 | Argentine Primera División | 0 | 0 | 0 | 0 | 0 | 0 | 0 | 0 | 0 | 0 | 0 | 0 |
| San Martín | 2019–20 | Primera B Nacional | 6 | 0 | 0 | 0 | — | | — | | 0 | 0 | 6 | 0 |
| Plaza Colonia | 2020 | Uruguayan Primera División | 7 | 0 | — | | — | | 0 | 0 | 0 | 0 | 7 | 0 |
| Deportivo La Coruña | 2020–21 | Segunda División B | 7 | 0 | 0 | 0 | 0 | 0 | — | | 0 | 0 | 7 | 0 |
| Career total | | | 176 | 15 | 0 | 0 | 0 | 0 | 14 | 0 | 3 | 0 | 193 | 15 |

== Honours ==
Danubio

- Uruguayan Primera División: 2013–14

Uruguay U22

- Pan American Games: 2015
