= Elsar Rodas =

Peruvian footballer (born 1994)

Personal information
- Full name: Elsar Rodas Mendoza
- Date of birth: 28 February 1994 (age 32)
- Place of birth: Chepén, Peru
- Height: 1.65 m (5 ft 5 in)
- Position: Left back

Team information
- Current team: Atlético Grau
- Number: 6

Senior career*
Years	Team	Apps	(Gls)
2012	Atlético Minero	1	(0)
2013–2014	Los Caimanes	39	(2)
2015	Sporting Cristal	0	(0)
2016–2017	Juan Aurich	75	(2)
2018–2021	César Vallejo	76	(7)
2022–	Atlético Grau	115	(2)

International career^{‡}
2015	Peru U–22	3	(1)
- * Club domestic league appearances and goals as of 29 December 2025 ‡ National team caps and goals as of 20:15, 19 January 2020 (UTC)

Elsar Rodas Mendoza (born 28 February 1994) is a Peruvian footballer who plays for Atlético Grau.

== Honours ==
Los Caimanes

Winner

- Peruvian Segunda División: 2013
