= Sebastián Gorga =

Uruguayan footballer (born 1994)

Personal information
- Full name: Sebastián Gorga Nogueira
- Date of birth: 6 April 1994 (age 32)
- Place of birth: Montevideo, Uruguay
- Height: 1.87 m (6 ft 2 in)
- Position: Center-back

Team information
- Current team: Bella Italia

Youth career
- La Picada FC
- –2015: Nacional

Senior career*
Years	Team	Apps	(Gls)
2013–2016	Nacional	20	(0)
2016–2018	Genoa	0	(0)
2016	→ Nacional (loan)	2	(0)
2016–2017	→ Gimnasia (loan)	14	(0)
2017	→ Chacarita Juniors (loan)	2	(0)
2018	Nacional	0	(0)
2018	→ Palestino (loan)		
2018–2019	Montevideo Wanderers	13	(1)
2019–2020	River Plate	10	(0)
2020-2021	Boston River	9	(0)
2021	Central	10	(1)
2022–2023	Rampla Juniors	27	(1)
2023–2024	Marathón	13	(2)
2024	Rampla Juniors	15	(0)
2024–2025	Bellinzona	23	(1)
2025–2026	Rentistas	4	(0)
2026–	Bella Italia	0	(0)

International career
2011	Uruguay U17	1	(0)
2015	Uruguay U23	4	(0)
- * Club domestic league appearances and goals as of 12 March 2026

Sebastián Gorga Nogueira (born 6 April 1994) is a Uruguayan footballer who plays as a defender for Uruguayan Primera División Amateur club Bella Italia.

== Club career ==
On 30 July 2024, Gorga signed with Bellinzona in Switzerland.
