= Derlis Alegre =

Paraguayan footballer (born 1994)

Personal information
- Full name: Derlis Roberto Alegre Amante
- Date of birth: 10 January 1994 (age 32)
- Place of birth: Limpio, Paraguay
- Height: 1.67 m (5 ft 6 in)
- Position: Winger

Team information
- Current team: Santa Cruz
- Number: 16

Senior career*
Years	Team	Apps	(Gls)
2013–2017	Sportivo Luqueño	156	(17)
2018–2020	Club Nacional	48	(2)
2020–	Santa Cruz	5	(0)

International career^{‡}
2015–	Paraguay U23	1	(0)
- * Club domestic league appearances and goals as of 15 March 2018 ‡ National team caps and goals as of 14:19, 19 July 2015 (UTC)

Derlis Alegre (born 10 January 1994) is a Paraguayan footballer who plays for Tembetary as a winger.
