= Andrey (footballer, born 1993) =

Brazilian footballer (born 1993)

Personal information
- Full name: Andrey da Silva Ventura
- Date of birth: 17 July 1993 (age 33)
- Place of birth: Rio de Janeiro, Brazil
- Height: 1.90 m (6 ft 3 in)
- Position: Goalkeeper

Team information
- Current team: Guarani

Youth career
- Botafogo

Senior career*
Years	Team	Apps	(Gls)
2012–2014	Botafogo	8	(0)
2015–2017	Botafogo-SP	1	(0)
2016	→ Cabofriense (loan)	12	(0)
2017	→ São Bento (loan)	0	(0)
2017	→ Volta Redonda (loan)	19	(0)
2018–2020	Sampaio Corrêa	49	(0)
2019	→ CRB (loan)	6	(0)
2020	Treze	13	(0)
2021	Sampaio Corrêa-RJ	4	(0)
2021	→ Volta Redonda (loan)	11	(0)
2022	Altos	2	(0)
2023	Juazeirense	0	(0)
2023	Galícia		
2023	→ Manaus (loan)	7	(0)
2023	Inter de Lages		
2024-2025	Desportiva	12	(0)
2025-	Guarani	15	(0)
2026	→ Guarani (loan)	11	(0)

International career
2015	Brazil U23	5	(0)
Medal record
Representing Brazil
Men's football
Pan American Games
Bronze medal – third place	2015 Toronto	Team competition
- * Club domestic league appearances and goals as of 10 November 2026

Andrey da Silva Ventura (born 17 July 1993), simply known as Andrey, is a Brazilian footballer who plays as a goalkeeper for Guarani.

== Club career ==
Born in Rio de Janeiro, Andrey finished his formation with Botafogo. On 16 July 2014 he made his first team – and Série A – debut, starting in a 0–1 away loss against Sport Recife.

Andrey appeared in four matches during the campaign, suffering team relegation. On 22 January 2015, he rescinded his link with the club, moving to Botafogo-SP shortly after. He was part of the team that won the 2015 Campeonato Brasileiro Série D.

He was loaned to Cabofriense in January 2016, reuniting with former coach Eduardo Hungaro.

== International career ==
Andrey was called to the Brazil under-23 side that played in the Football at the 2015 Pan American Games – Men's tournament, starting all the five matches as Brazil won the bronze medal.

== Sexual assault allegation ==
In 2015, Andrey represented Brazil at the Pan American Games. The Toronto Police Service issued arrest warrants for him and teammate Lucas Piazon, on charges of sexual assault of a 21-year-old woman whom they met at the Drake nightclub; allegedly, Piazon and Ventura entered the woman's bedroom after she had gone to sleep and then assaulted her. The police stated that due to the limited nature of the Ontario-wide nature of the warrant, "we can't go through the extradition process."

The charges against Piazon were later dropped, although the charges against Andrey Ventura still stand.

== Personal life ==
Andrey is the brother of Andrew, who is also a Brazilian football goalkeeper.
