= Luis Cárdenas (footballer) =

Mexican footballer (born 1993)

Personal information
- Full name: Luis Alberto Cárdenas López
- Date of birth: 15 September 1993 (age 33)
- Place of birth: Los Mochis, Sinaloa, Mexico
- Height: 1.76 m (5 ft 9 in)
- Position: Goalkeeper

Team information
- Current team: Monterrey
- Number: 22

Youth career
- 2009–2017: Monterrey
- 2018: → Querétaro (loan)
- 2019: Monterrey

Senior career*
Years	Team	Apps	(Gls)
2013–	Monterrey	66	(0)
2017–2018	→ Zacatepec (loan)	28	(0)
Medal record
Representing Mexico
Men's football
Olympic Qualifying Championship
Winner	2015 United States
- * Club domestic league appearances and goals as of 21 November 2026

Luis Alberto Cárdenas López (born 15 September 1993), also known as El Mochis, is a Mexican professional footballer who plays as a goalkeeper for Liga MX club Monterrey.

== Career statistics ==
As of match played on 21 November 2026

Appearances and goals by club, season and competition
Club	Season	League			Cup		Continental		Global		Other		Total	
Club	Season	Division	Apps	Goals	Apps	Goals	Apps	Goals	Apps	Goals	Apps	Goals	Apps	Goals
Monterrey	2013–14	Liga MX	—		1	0	—		—		—		1	0
Monterrey	2015–16	Liga MX	2	0	1	0	—		—		—		3	0
Monterrey	2018–19	Liga MX	2	0	—		—		—		—		2	0
Monterrey	2019–20	Liga MX	—		12	0	—		1 (Note: Appearance in FIFA Club World Cup)	0	—		13	0
Monterrey	2020–21	Liga MX	4	0	—		4 (Note: Appearances in CONCACAF Champions Cup)	0	—		—		8	0
Monterrey	2021–22	Liga MX	3	0	—		—		—		—		3	0
Monterrey	2022–23	Liga MX	9	0	—		—		—		—		9	0
Monterrey	2023–24	Liga MX	2	0	—		—		—		1 (Note: Appearances in Leagues Cup)	0	3	0
Monterrey	2024–25	Liga MX	16	0	—		2	0	—		—		18	0
Monterrey	2025–26	Liga MX	21	0	—		1	0	—		3	0	25	0
Monterrey	2026–27	Liga MX	7	0	—		—		—		3	0	10	0
Monterrey	Total		66	0	14	0	7	0	1	0	7	0	95	0
Zacatepec (loan)	2017–18	Ascenso MX	28	0	3	0	—		—		—		31	0
Career total			94	0	17	0	7	0	1	0	7	0	126	0

== Honours ==
Monterrey

- Liga MX: Apertura 2019
- Copa MX: 2019–20
- CONCACAF Champions League: 2012–13, 2019, 2021

Mexico Youth

- Central American and Caribbean Games: 2014
- Pan American Silver Medal: 2015
- CONCACAF Olympic Qualifying Championship: 2015
