= Jacsson =

Brazilian footballer

Personal information
- Full name: Jacsson Antonio Wichnovski
- Date of birth: 12 March 1994 (age 32)
- Place of birth: Getúlio Vargas, Rio Grande do Sul, Brazil
- Height: 1.89 m (6 ft 2 1/2 in)
- Position: Goalkeeper

Team information
- Current team: Pelotas

Youth career
- –2015: Internacional

Senior career*
Years	Team	Apps	(Gls)
2016–2018	Internacional	1	(0)
2017	→ Santa Cruz (loan)	4	(0)
2018	→ Bolívar (loan)	6	(0)
2018–2019	São Caetano	0	(0)
2020–2021	Novo Hamburgo	16	(0)
2021	Inter de Lages	0	(0)
2022	Patrocinense	9	(0)
2023	Avenida	0	(0)
2023–	Pelotas	22	(0)

International career^{‡}
2014–2015	Brazil U23	6	(0)
- * Club domestic league appearances and goals as of 24 November 2023 ‡ National team caps and goals as of 24 November 2023

Jacsson Antonio Wichnovski (born 12 March 1994), commonly known as Jacsson, is a Brazilian footballer who currently plays as a goalkeeper for Pelotas.

== Career statistics ==
=== Club ===
As of 12.

Club	Season	League			Cup		Continental		Other		Total	
Club	Season	Division	Apps	Goals	Apps	Goals	Apps	Goals	Apps	Goals	Apps	Goals
Internacional	2016	Série A	1	0	0	0	0	0	0	0	1	0
Internacional	2017	Série A	0	0	0	0	0	0	0	0	0	0
Internacional	2018	Série A	0	0	0	0	0	0	0	0	0	0
Internacional	Total		1	0	0	0	0	0	0	0	1	0
Santa Cruz (loan)	2017	Série B	4	0	1 (Note: Appearances in the Copa do Nordeste)	0	–		3 (Note: Appearances in the Campeonato Pernambucano)	0	8	0
Bolívar (loan)	2018	Bolivian Primera División	6	0	0	0	0	0	0	0	6	0
São Caetano	2018	–			2 (Note: Appearances in the Copa Paulista)	0	–		0	0	2	0
São Caetano	2019	Série D	0	0	0	0	–		7 (Note: Appearances in the Campeonato Paulista)	0	7	0
São Caetano	Total		0	0	2	0	0	0	7	0	9	0
Career total			11	0	3	0	0	0	10	0	24	0

== Honours ==
Brazil U23

- Pan American Games: (bronze) 2015
- Wuhan Youth Soccer Tournament: 2014
