= Shackeil Henry =

Trinidad and Tobago footballer

Personal information
- Full name: Shackeil Henry
- Date of birth: 2 April 1994 (age 32)
- Place of birth: Trinidad and Tobago
- Position: Forward

Senior career*
Years	Team	Apps	(Gls)
2014–2016	Point Fortin Civic F.C.	?	(8)
2016–2017	W Connection F.C.	?	(4)
2017–2018	Sông Lam Nghệ An F.C	13	(6)
2018	Nam Định F.C	18	(3)

International career^{‡}
2010–2011	Trinidad and Tobago U17	6	(7)
2012	Trinidad and Tobago U20	5	(1)
2015–	Trinidad and Tobago U22	2	(1)
- * Club domestic league appearances and goals as of 22:33, 14 April 2017 (UTC) ‡ National team caps and goals as of 15:30, 23 July 2015 (UTC)

Shackeil Henry (born 2 April 1994) is a Trinidad and Tobago footballer.
