= Raúl Gutiérrez =

Mexican footballer and manager (born 1966)

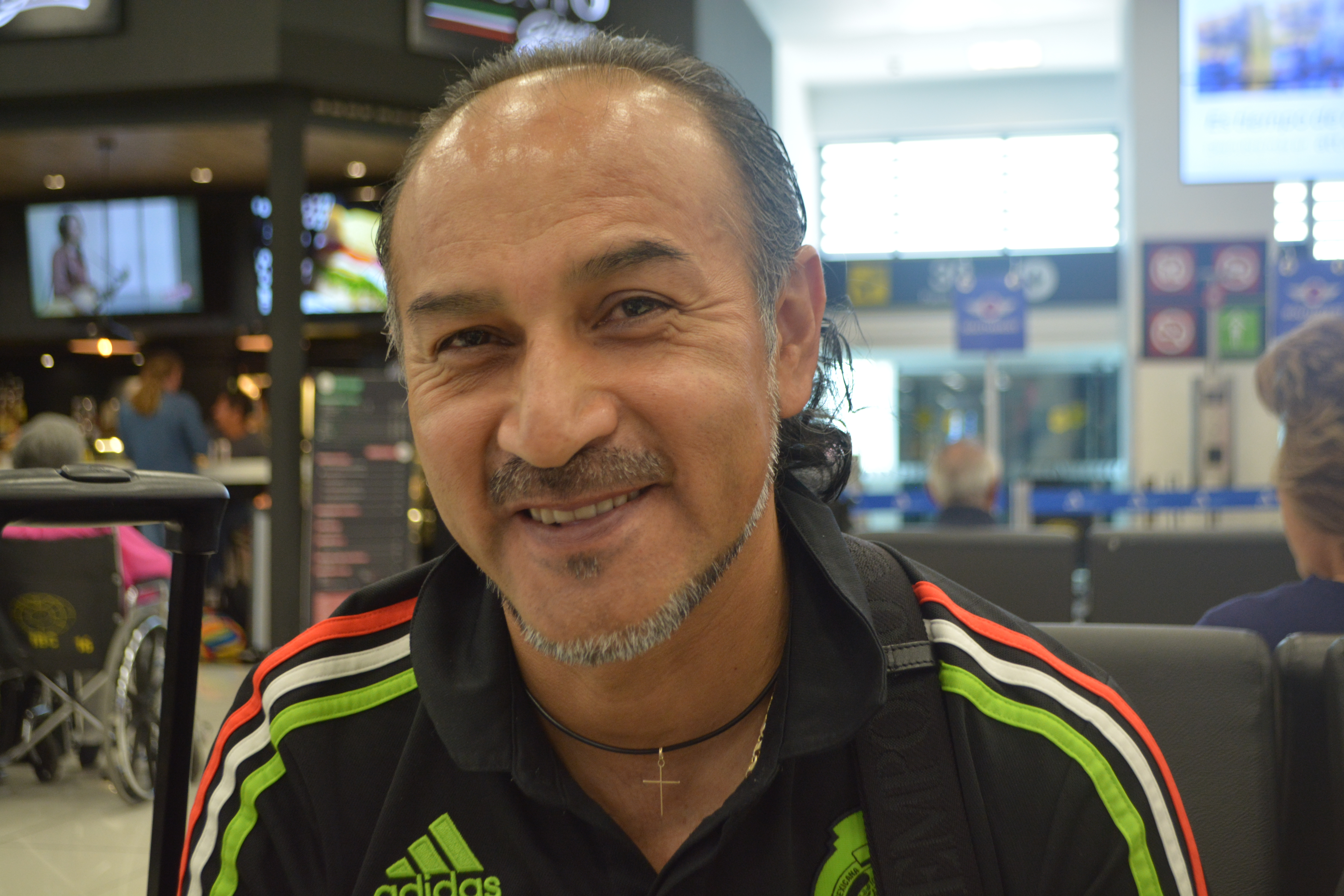

Personal information
- Full name: Raúl Erasto Gutiérrez Jacobo
- Date of birth: 16 October 1966 (age 60)
- Place of birth: Mexico City, Mexico
- Height: 1.73 m (5 ft 8 in)
- Position: Defender

Senior career*
Years	Team	Apps	(Gls)
1986–1994	Atlante		
1994–2001	América		
2002	León	14	(1)

International career
1991–1996	Mexico	37	(0)

Managerial career
- 2007–2009: Correcaminos UAT
- 2010–2013: Mexico U17
- 2014–2016: Mexico Olympic
- 2017: Atlante
- 2019: Potros UAEM
- 2020: San José
- 2021–2022: Real España
- 2022: Cruz Azul Reserves
- 2022: Cruz Azul (Interim)
- 2023: Cruz Azul
- 2023–2024: Correcaminos UAT
- 2026: Cruz Azul (women)
Medal record
Men's football
Representing Mexico (as player)
Copa America
Runner-up	1993
Representing Mexico (as manager)
FIFA U-17 World Cup
Winner	2011
Runner-up	2013
- * Club domestic league appearances and goals

Raúl Erasto Gutiérrez Jacobo (born 16 October 1966), also known as El Potro, is a Mexican professional football manager and former player. At the 2011 FIFA U-17 World Cup, he coached the Mexico U-17 team to their second title.

== Playing career ==
He was a part of the Mexico national team in the 1994 FIFA World Cup. He was capped in 37 games for the Mexico national football team. He played for Atlante F.C. from 1988 until 1994, and he played for Club América from 1994 until 2001.

== Managerial career ==
=== Mexico U-17 ===
As the coach of the Mexico U-17 national team, he won the 2011 FIFA U-17 World Cup. This was Mexico's second FIFA U-17 World Cup title, and also became the first team to win the tournament at home.

He continued to coach Mexico U-17 in 2013, in which he qualified them to the 2013 FIFA U-17 World Cup. Mexico started the U-17 World cup with a 6–1 loss to Nigeria, but recovered with a 3–1 win against Iraq. Mexico would reach the final after beating teams like Italy, Brazil, and Argentina. In the final, Mexico would lose once again with Nigeria 3–0.

=== Mexico Olympic Football Team ===
After the success at U-17 level, it was made official that Raúl Gutiérrez will coach the Mexico U-21 team, which will participate in the Central American and Caribbean Games, 2015 Pan American Games, 2015 CONCACAF Men's Olympic Qualifying Championship, and 2016 Summer Olympics.

=== Atlante ===
On 6 June 2017, Gutiérrez was named the head coach of Atlante FC.

On 22 October 2017, Atlante announced they had parted ways with Gutiérrez, after a 4–1 loss against Tampico Madero.

== Managerial statistics ==
=== Managerial statistics ===
As of 4 February 2023

Team	Nat	From	To	Record							
Team	Nat	From	To	G	W	D	L	GF	GA	GD	Win %
Mexico U-17	(Mexico)	2010	2013	19	16	1	2	42	21	+21	84.21
Mexico U-20	(Mexico)	2013	2016	29	17	6	6	58	31	+27	58.62
Atlante	(Mexico)	2017		16	4	4	8	13	19	−6	25.00
Total				64	37	11	16	113	71	+42	57.81

== Honours ==
=== Player ===
Potros Neza

- Segunda División De Mexico: 1988–89

Atlante

- Mexican Primera División: 1992–93
- Segunda División de Mexico: 1990–91

América

- CONCACAF Giants Cup: 2001

Mexico

- CONCACAF Gold Cup: 1996

=== Manager ===
Mexico Youth

- FIFA U-17 World Cup: 2011
- Central American and Caribbean Games: 2014
- Pan American Silver Medal: 2015
- CONCACAF Men's Olympic Qualifying Tournament: 2015
