= 2013–14 Campeonato Uruguayo Primera División =

110th season of the top-tier football league in Uruguay

Liga Profesional de Primera División
- Season: 2013–14
- Champions: Danubio (4th title)
- 2015 Copa Libertadores: Danubio; Montevideo Wanderers; Nacional
- 2014 Copa Sudamericana: Danubio; River Plate; Peñarol; Rentistas

The 2013–14 Liga Profesional de Primera División season, also known as the 2013–14 Copa Uruguaya or the 2013–14 Campeonato Uruguayo, was the 110th season of Uruguay's top-flight football league, and the 83rd in which it was professional. Peñarol was the defending champion. Danubio won the title, their fourth league championship victory in the club's history.

== Teams ==
Sixteen teams competed in the Primera División during this season. Thirteen teams remained from the 2012–13 season. Bella Vista, Progreso, and Central Español were relegated after accumulating the fewest points in the relegation table. They were replaced by Sud América, Rentistas, and Miramar Misiones, the 2012–13 Segunda División winner, runner-up, and playoff winner, respectively. All of the new teams made repeat appearances in the top division.

Locations of the 2013–14 season teams outside Montevideo.
Locations of the 2013−14 Primera División teams within Montevideo.

Club	City	Stadium	Capacity
Cerro	Montevideo	Luis Tróccoli	24,000
Cerro Largo	Melo	Arquitecto Antonio Eleuterio Ubilla	9,000
Danubio	Montevideo	Jardines Del Hipódromo	14,401
Defensor Sporting	Montevideo	Luis Franzini	9,357
El Tanque Sisley	Montevideo	Campeones Olímpicos	7,000
Fénix	Montevideo	Parque Capurro	5,500
Juventud	Las Piedras	Parque Artigas	12,000
Liverpool	Montevideo	Belvedere	8,384
Miramar Misiones	Montevideo	Parque Méndez Piana	6,500
Montevideo Wanderers	Montevideo	Parque Alfredo Víctor Viera	7,420
Nacional	Montevideo	Gran Parque Central	23,500
Peñarol	Montevideo	Estadio Centenario	65,235
Racing	Montevideo	Osvaldo Roberto	8,500
Rentistas	Montevideo	Complejo Rentistas	10,600
River Plate	Montevideo	Parque Federico Omar Saroldi	5,624
Sud América	San José	Casto Martínez Laguarda	6,000

== Torneo Apertura ==
=== Standings ===
Pos	Team	Pld	W	D	L	GF	GA	GD	Pts	Qualification
1	Danubio	15	10	2	3	24	13	+11	32	Championship Playoffs
2	River Plate	15	9	4	2	30	17	+13	31	
3	Nacional	15	10	0	5	29	18	+11	30	
4	Montevideo Wanderers	15	7	6	2	25	18	+7	27	
5	Rentistas	15	7	4	4	22	21	+1	25	
6	Liverpool	15	6	4	5	18	15	+3	22	
7	El Tanque Sisley	15	5	6	4	18	17	+1	21	
8	Peñarol	15	5	4	6	23	20	+3	19	
9	Cerro Largo	15	5	4	6	19	22	−3	19	
10	Cerro	15	5	2	8	21	25	−4	17	
11	Sud América	15	4	5	6	16	21	−5	17	
12	Defensor Sporting	15	4	4	7	22	25	−3	16	
13	Fénix	15	4	3	8	18	20	−2	15	
14	Racing	15	4	3	8	18	23	−5	15	
15	Miramar Misiones	15	2	6	7	11	28	−17	12	
16	Juventud	15	2	5	8	18	29	−11	11	

=== Results ===
Home \ Away	CRR	CRL	DAN	DFS	ETS	FNX	JUV	LIV	MMI	WAN	NAC	PEÑ	RAC	REN	RIV	IASA
Cerro				0–2				2–1	1–2	3–1		1–0	0–1	0–2	3–5	
Cerro Largo	2–1		0–0			0–1				1–1	1–4	1–0		2–3		2–0
Danubio	2–1					2–1	4–1			0–1	2–0			0–3	1–2	
Defensor Sporting		2–2	1–3		0–1	1–0					5–3	1–1			1–1	
El Tanque Sisley	2–3	1–1	0–2				2–0				0–1		2–2	4–0		1–1
Fénix	0–0				1–2		4–2	0–1		2–2			0–2		1–2	
Juventud	2–2	1–3		3–1							1–3		3–1	0–1		0–2
Liverpool		3–1	1–2	1–0	0–0		2–2									2–0
Miramar Misiones		2–1	1–1	0–1	0–2	0–0	0–0				1–4			1–1		
Montevideo Wanderers				2–1	5–0		1–1	1–0	4–2			1–1		1–0	1–1	
Nacional	1–0					1–2		1–2		3–0		2–3	1–0		1–0	3–1
Peñarol			1–2		0–0	2–1		2–0	5–0					2–3	2–4	
Racing		0–1	0–2	1–0				0–3	5–0	3–3		2–3			0–3	
Rentistas				6–5		0–3		0–0			0–1		1–1			1–1
River Plate		3–1			1–1		3–2	2–0	1–0					0–1		2–2
Sud América	2–4		0–1			3–2			0–0	0–1		2–1	1–0			

Updated to match(es) played on December 2013. Source:
Legend: Blue = home team win; Yellow = draw; Red = away team win.

== Torneo Clausura ==
=== Standings ===
Pos	Team	Pld	W	D	L	GF	GA	GD	Pts	Qualification
1	Montevideo Wanderers	15	11	1	3	36	18	+18	34	Championship Playoffs
2	Peñarol	15	10	3	2	32	13	+19	33	
3	Nacional	15	9	0	6	26	18	+8	27	
4	River Plate	15	8	2	5	21	16	+5	26	
5	Danubio	15	7	4	4	24	20	+4	25	
6	Fénix	15	7	3	5	27	19	+8	24	
7	Racing	15	7	3	5	19	18	+1	24	
8	Juventud	15	6	3	6	23	25	−2	21	
9	Defensor Sporting	15	5	5	5	25	26	−1	20	
10	Rentistas	15	6	2	7	18	23	−5	20	
11	Cerro	15	6	2	7	23	27	−4	20	
12	Sud América	15	5	3	7	19	24	−5	18	
13	Liverpool	15	4	4	7	23	24	−1	16	
14	El Tanque Sisley	15	3	3	9	20	25	−5	12	
15	Miramar Misiones	15	3	1	11	12	29	−17	10	
16	Cerro Largo	15	2	3	10	13	36	−23	9	

=== Results ===
Home \ Away	CRR	CRL	DAN	DFS	ETS	FNX	JUV	LIV	MMI	WAN	NAC	PEÑ	RAC	REN	RIV	IASA
Cerro		2–1	1–1		1–3	3–1	2–3				1–3					1–1
Cerro Largo				1–5	2–1		0–3	2–2	0–1				0–1		2–2	
Danubio		1–1		1–1	1–0			2–1	3–1			0–2	2–1			3–3
Defensor Sporting	1–3						2–1	1–3	2–1	1–2			2–1	1–1		2–1
El Tanque Sisley				3–3		1–2		1–4	1–0	0–1		3–4			0–1	
Fénix		5–1	1–2	1–1					2–1		1–4	0–1		1–2		4–1
Juventud			2–3		0–4	1–1		2–0		2–3					3–1	
Liverpool	2–3					0–2				2–2	1–0	1–1	2–2	2–0	0–1	
Miramar Misiones	0–1							3–2		0–5		0–2	0–2		0–2	0–1
Montevideo Wanderers	3–1	4–0	3–2			0–2					3–2		3–1			3–1
Nacional		3–0	0–2	2–0	3–1		0–1							2–0		
Peñarol	0–1	3–1		2–2			4–0			2–1	5–0		1–1	1–2		2–0
Racing	2–1				2–1	0–3	0–0				0–2					3–1
Rentistas	4–1	3–1	1–0		1–1		0–3		1–3	1–3					1–0	
River Plate	2–1		2–1	3–1		1–1				1–0	3–0	1–2	0–2			
Sud América		0–1			0–0		3–0	2–1			0–2				2–1	

Updated to match(es) played on 2013.. Source:
Legend: Blue = home team win; Yellow = draw; Red = away team win.

== Aggregate table ==
Pos	Team	Pld	W	D	L	GF	GA	GD	Pts	Qualification
1	Montevideo Wanderers	30	18	7	5	61	36	+25	61	2015 Copa Libertadores Second Stage
2	Nacional	30	19	0	11	55	36	+19	57	2015 Copa Libertadores First Stage
3	River Plate	30	17	6	7	51	33	+18	57	2014 Copa Sudamericana First Stage
4	Danubio	30	17	6	7	48	33	+15	57	2015 Copa Libertadores Second Stage and 2014 Copa Sudamericana First Stage (Note: Danubio qualified for the 2015 Copa Libertadores and 2014 Copa Sudamericana as the league champion.)
5	Peñarol	30	15	7	8	55	33	+22	52	2014 Copa Sudamericana First Stage
6	Rentistas	30	13	6	11	40	44	−4	45	2014 Copa Sudamericana First Stage
7	Fénix	30	11	6	13	45	39	+6	39	
8	Racing	30	11	6	13	37	41	−4	39	
9	Liverpool	30	10	8	12	41	39	+2	38	
10	Cerro	30	11	4	15	44	52	−8	37	
11	Defensor Sporting	30	9	9	12	47	51	−4	36	
12	Sud América	30	9	8	13	35	45	−10	35	
13	El Tanque Sisley	30	8	9	13	38	42	−4	33	
14	Juventud	30	8	8	14	41	54	−13	32	
15	Cerro Largo	30	7	7	16	32	58	−26	28	
16	Miramar Misiones	30	5	7	18	23	57	−34	22	

== Relegation ==
Pos	Team	2012–13 Pts	2013–14 Pts	Total Pts	Total Pld	Avg	Relegation
1	Peñarol	66	52	118	60	1.97	
2	Nacional	58	57	115	60	1.92	
3	River Plate	51	57	108	60	1.8	
4	Montevideo Wanderers	40	61	101	60	1.68	
5	Defensor Sporting	63	36	99	60	1.65	
6	Danubio	35	57	92	60	1.53	
7	Rentistas	—	45	45	30	1.5	
8	El Tanque Sisley	48	33	81	60	1.35	
9	Fénix	40	39	79	60	1.317	
10	Racing	37	39	76	60	1.267	
11	Juventud	40	32	72	60	1.2	
12	Cerro	35	37	72	60	1.2	
13	Sud América	—	35	35	30	1.167	
14	Liverpool	31	38	69	60	1.15	Relegation to Segunda División
15	Cerro Largo	27	28	55	60	0.917	Relegation to Segunda División
16	Miramar Misiones	—	22	22	30	0.733	Relegation to Segunda División

== Championship playoff ==
Danubio and Montevideo Wanderers qualified to the championship playoffs as the Apertura and Clausura winners, respectively. Additionally, Montevideo Wanderers re-qualified as the team with the most points in the season aggregate table. Given this situation, an initial playoff was held between the two teams. Montevideo Wanderers would become the season champion with a win; Danubio needed to win the playoff to force a two-legged final.

Semifinal		Finals
		Danubio (Semi-final winners) (p)	0	2 (3)
Danubio (Apertura winners)	3	Montevideo Wanderers (Aggregate table first place)	0	2 (2)
Montevideo Wanderers (Clausura winners)	0

=== Semifinal ===
May 25, 2014

Danubio	3–0	Montevideo Wanderers
Ricca 20'; Sosa 38'; Formiliano 55'

Estadio Luis Franzini, Montevideo
Referee: Daniel Fedorczuk

=== Finals ===
June 3, 2014

Danubio	0–0	Montevideo Wanderers

Estadio Luis Franzini, Montevideo
Attendance: °
Referee: Darío Ubríaco
June 8, 2014
16:00 (UTC-3)

Montevideo Wanderers	2–2 (a.e.t.)	Danubio
D. Riolfo 76'; N. Albarracín 104'	Report	Sosa 24'; C. Mayada 118'
Penalties
R. Pastorino (penalty missed); M. Olivera (penalty missed); G. Rodríguez (penalty missed); F. Cristóforo (penalty scored); D. Riolfo (penalty scored); N. Albarracín (penalty missed)	2–3	(penalty scored) G. Porras; (penalty scored) C. Mayada; (penalty missed) J.I. González; (penalty missed) F. Formiliano; (penalty missed) F. Ricca; (penalty scored) G. Cotugno

Estadio Parque Central, Montevideo
Referee: Roberto Silvera

Primera División
2013–14 Champions
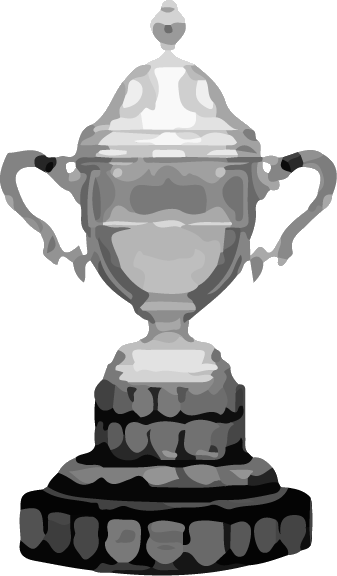

4th title
