= Uruguay national under-23 football team =

National association football team

Uruguay Olympic
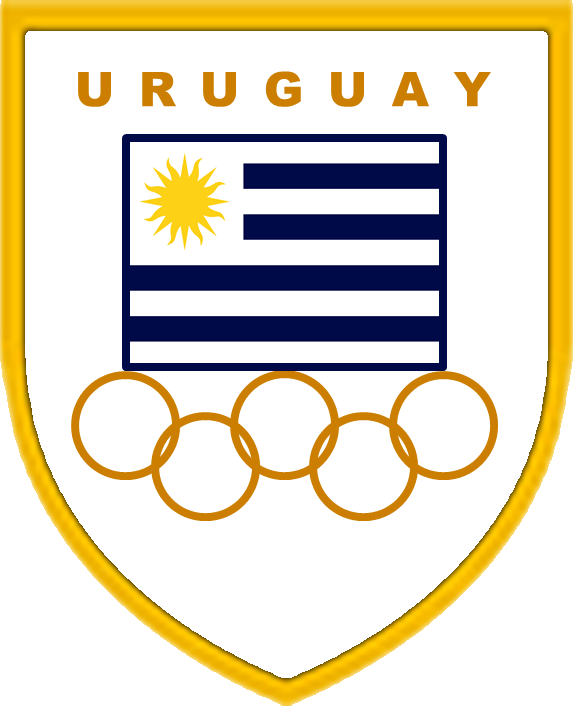
- Nickname(s): La Celeste Olímpica (The Olympic Sky Blue); La Celeste (The Sky Blue)
- Association: Asociación Uruguaya de Fútbol
- Confederation: CONMEBOL (South America)
- Head coach: Vacant
- Captain: César Araújo
- Home stadium: Estadio Centenario
- FIFA code: URU
| First colours | Second colours |

Olympic Games
- Appearances: 1 (first in 2012)
- Best result: Group Stage (2012)

Pan American Games
- Appearances: 8 (first in 1963)
- Best result: Gold medalists (1983, 2015)

CONMEBOL Pre-Olympic Tournament
- Appearances: 14 (first in 1960)
- Best result: Runners-up (1976)

The Uruguay national under-23 football team (also known as Uruguay Olympic football team) represents Uruguay in under-23 international football competitions such as the Olympic Games, CONMEBOL Pre-Olympic Tournament and Pan American Games. The selection is limited to players under the age of 23, except three overage players. The team is controlled by the Uruguayan Football Association (AUF).

== History ==
=== 1924–1988 ===
Uruguay's first participation in the Olympics was in Paris, France, in 1924. In that year, Uruguay won its first gold medal, beating Yugoslavia 7–0, United States 3–0, France 5–1, Netherlands 2–1, and in the Final defeating Switzerland 3–0.

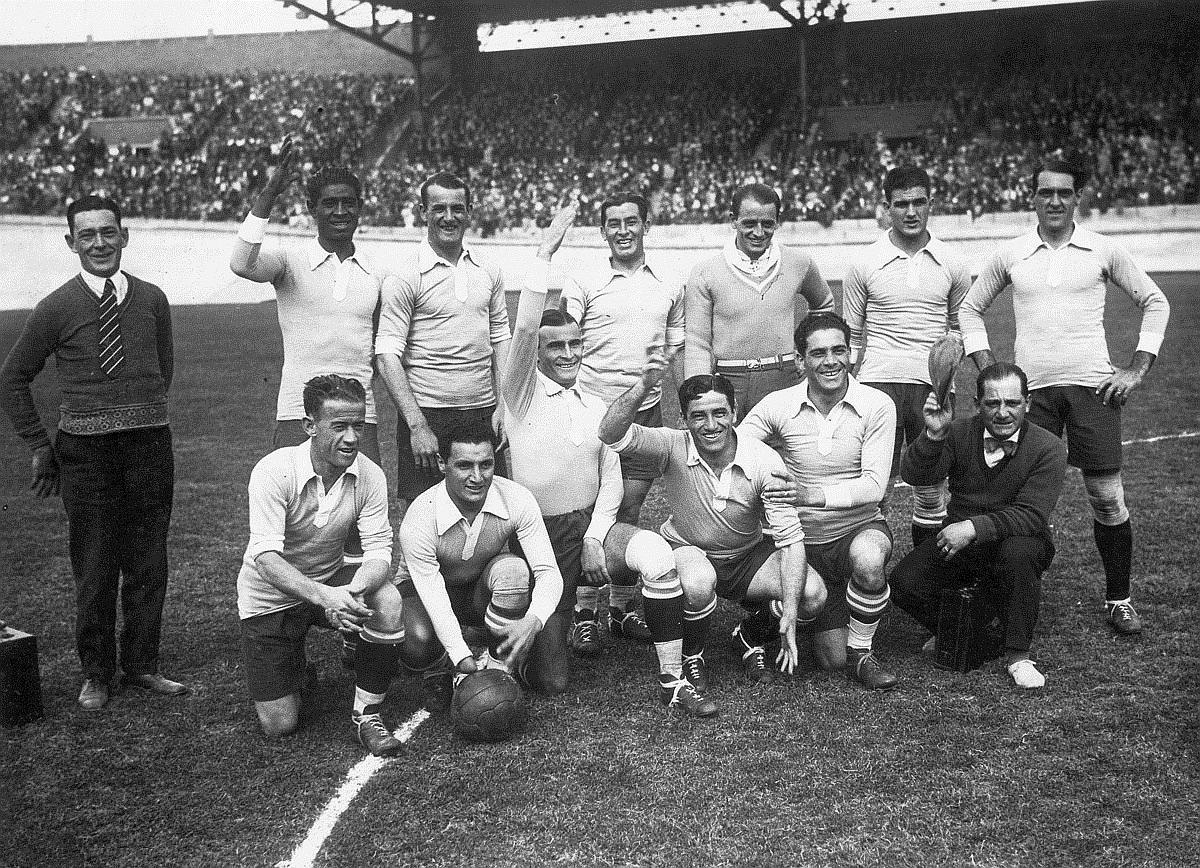
The Uruguay national football team that won the 1928 Olympic tournament

Uruguay's second participation in the Olympics was in Amsterdam, Netherlands, in 1928. In that year, Uruguay won its second gold medal, beating Netherlands 2–0, Germany 4–1, Italy 3–2, and in the first Final tying Argentina 1–1, and defeating Argentina 2–1 in the second final.

During this time, the Uruguay Olympic football team was the Senior Uruguay national football team. The 1924 and 1928 Olympics were special tournaments that were the status equivalent of the FIFA World Cup. After the World Cup was established, in order not to compete with it, the Olympics became amateur players only (like prior to 1924) and then in 1992 became Under-23.

=== 1992–present ===
Since the 1992 Olympics, the football event was changed into a tournament for under 23 teams, with a maximum of three overaged players. The era of the Uruguay national under-23 football team began in earnest.

== Competitive record ==
=== Olympic Games ===
Summer Olympics record
| Year | Round | Position | Pld | W | D | L | GF | GA | Squad |
|---|---|---|---|---|---|---|---|---|---|
| Until 1988 | See Uruguay national football team | | | | | | | | |
| (Spain) 1992 | Did not qualify | | | | | | | | |
| (United States) 1996 | Did not qualify | | | | | | | | |
| (Australia) 2000 | Did not qualify | | | | | | | | |
| (Greece) 2004 | Did not qualify | | | | | | | | |
| (China) 2008 | Did not qualify | | | | | | | | |
| (United Kingdom) 2012 | Group stage | 9th | 3 | 1 | 0 | 2 | 2 | 4 | Squad |
| (Brazil) 2016 | Did not qualify | | | | | | | | |
| (Japan) 2020 | Did not qualify | | | | | | | | |
| (France) 2024 | Did not qualify | | | | | | | | |
| (United States) 2028 | To be determined | | | | | | | | |
| Total | 2 Gold medals | 3/23 | 13 | 10 | 1 | 2 | 34 | 11 | — |

=== Pan American Games ===
Pan American Games record
| Year | Round | Position | Pld | W | D | L | GF | GA | Squad |
|---|---|---|---|---|---|---|---|---|---|
| Until 1995 | See Uruguay national football team | | | | | | | | |
| (Canada) 1999 | Preliminary round | 9th | 4 | 0 | 1 | 3 | 2 | 9 | Squad |
| (Dominican Republic) 2003 | Did not enter | | | | | | | | |
| (Brazil) 2007 | Did not enter | | | | | | | | |
| (Mexico) 2011 | Bronze medalists | 3rd | 5 | 2 | 1 | 2 | 6 | 8 | Squad |
| (Canada) 2015 | Gold medalists | 1st | 5 | 4 | 0 | 1 | 8 | 2 | Squad |
| (Peru) 2019 | Fourth place | 4th | 5 | 3 | 0 | 2 | 7 | 4 | Squad |
| (Chile) 2023 | Fifth place | 5th | 4 | 1 | 1 | 2 | 1 | 2 | Squad |
| (Peru) 2027 | To be determined | | | | | | | | |
| Total | 2 Gold medals | 8/19 | 23 | 10 | 3 | 10 | 24 | 25 | — |

== Results and fixtures ==
The following is a list of match results in the last 12 months, as well as any future matches that have been scheduled.

Win Draw Loss Fixture

== Players ==
=== Current squad ===
The following 22 players are called up for the 2024 CONMEBOL Pre-Olympic Tournament.

Caps and goals (Note: Uruguayan Football Association currently doesn't keep record of matches played and goals scored by the under-23 team players. Statistics here are calculated with the help of articles published in federation's official website, tweets from official X account and other reliable websites.) as of 2 February 2024, after the match against Argentina.

| No. | Pos. | Player | Date of birth (age) | Caps | Goals | Club |
|---|---|---|---|---|---|---|
| 1 | GK | Ignacio Suárez | 5 February 2002 (age 24) | 1 | 0 | (Uruguayan Football Association) Nacional |
| 12 | GK | Randall Rodríguez | 29 November 2003 (age 22) | 6 | 0 | Unattached |
| 23 | GK | Fabrizio Correa | 18 January 2001 (age 25) | 0 | 0 | (Uruguayan Football Association) Juventud |
| 2 | DF | Sebastián Boselli | 4 December 2003 (age 22) | 4 | 0 | (Royal Spanish Football Federation) Getafe |
| 3 | DF | Mateo Antoni | 22 April 2003 (age 23) | 0 | 0 | (Peruvian Football Federation) Alianza Lima |
| 4 | DF | Mateo Ponte | 24 May 2003 (age 23) | 6 | 0 | (Brazilian Football Confederation) Botafogo |
| 6 | DF | Valentín Rodríguez | 13 June 2001 (age 25) | 6 | 0 | Unattached |
| 14 | DF | Nicolás Marichal | 17 March 2001 (age 25) | 6 | 0 | (Russian Football Union) Dynamo Moscow |
| 22 | DF | Fredy Martínez | 1 May 2001 (age 25) | 5 | 0 | (Uruguayan Football Association) Boston River |
| 5 | MF | César Araújo (captain) | 2 April 2001 (age 25) | 5 | 1 | (Mexican Football Federation) Tigres UANL |
| 8 | MF | Rodrigo Chagas | 20 August 2003 (age 23) | 9 | 0 | (Uruguayan Football Association) Juventud |
| 10 | MF | Tiago Palacios | 28 March 2001 (age 25) | 6 | 0 | (Argentine Football Association) Estudiantes |
| 15 | MF | Vicente Poggi | 11 July 2002 (age 24) | 7 | 0 | (Argentine Football Association) Godoy Cruz |
| 16 | MF | Erico Cuello | 25 May 2005 (age 21) | 0 | 0 | (Uruguayan Football Association) Defensor Sporting |
| 18 | MF | Santiago Homenchenko | 30 August 2003 (age 23) | 6 | 2 | (Mexican Football Federation) Querétaro |
| 7 | FW | Anderson Duarte | 23 March 2004 (age 22) | 4 | 0 | (Mexican Football Federation) Atlético San Luis |
| 9 | FW | Matias Fonseca | 12 March 2001 (age 25) | 3 | 0 | (Argentine Football Association) Instituto |
| 11 | FW | Juan Cruz de los Santos | 22 February 2003 (age 23) | 10 | 0 | (United Arab Emirates Football Association) Al Jazira |
| 13 | FW | Agustín Albarracín | 29 August 2005 (age 21) | 0 | 0 | (Royal Spanish Football Federation) Albacete |
| 17 | FW | Matías Abaldo | 2 April 2004 (age 22) | 5 | 1 | (Argentine Football Association) Independiente |
| 19 | FW | Luciano Rodríguez | 16 July 2003 (age 23) | 6 | 6 | (Brazilian Football Confederation) Cruzeiro |
| 21 | FW | Renzo Sánchez | 17 February 2004 (age 22) | 5 | 1 | (Uruguayan Football Association) Montevideo Wanderers |

== Coaching staff ==
As of 8 August 2026

| Position | Name |
|---|---|
| Head coach | Vacant |
| Assistant coaches | Vacant |
| Goalkeeping coach | Vacant |

== Honours ==
- Pan American Games:
  - (gold) Gold medalists (2): 1983, 2015
  - (bronze) Bronze medalists (1): 2011
  - Fourth place: 1963
- South American Games:
  - (silver) Silver Medalists (1): 2018
- CONMEBOL Pre-Olympic Tournament:
  - Runners-up (1): 1976
  - Third place (3): 1968, 1992, 1996
  - Fourth place (1): 2000
- Copa Mercosur:
  - Winners: 1996

== See also ==
- Uruguay national football team
- Uruguay local national football team
- Uruguay national under-20 football team
- Uruguay national under-18 football team
- Uruguay national under-17 football team
- Uruguay national under-15 football team
