= Brazil national under-23 football team results (1991–present) =

This page details the match results and statistics of the Brazil olympic football team during the age restriction (U-23) era.

Win Draw Loss

== 1990s ==
4 December 1991 Friendly	Argentina	2–1	Brazil	Buenos Aires, Argentina
	Latorre; Flores		Sílvio	Stadium: Estadio José Amalfitani; Referee: E. Filippi (Uruguay)

19 December 1991 Friendly	Brazil	2–0	Uruguay	Maringá, Brazil
	Cafu; Élber			Stadium: Estádio Willie Davids; Referee: T. Rodrigues (Brazil)

14 January 1992 Friendly	Uruguay	3–0	Brazil	Montevideo, Uruguay
	Saralegui; Cafu (o.g.); Tejera			Stadium: Centenario; Referee: F. Cardelino (Uruguay)

19 January 1992 Friendly	Brazil	0–1	Argentina	Teresina, Brazil
			Flores	Stadium: Albertão; Referee: Lineu Lisboa (Brazil)

22 January 1992 Friendly	Brazil	3–0	United States	Aracaju, Brazil
	Elivélton; Allnut (o.g.)			Stadium: Batistão; Referee: Sidrack Marinho (Brazil)

1 February 1992 1992 Pre-Olympic Tournament	Brazil	2–1	Peru	Asunción, Paraguay
	Élber 52', 63'		Zegarra 81'	Stadium: Defensores del Chaco; Referee: Javier Castrilli (Argentina)

3 February 1992 1992 Pre-Olympic Tournament	Paraguay	0–1	Brazil	Asunción, Paraguay
			Márcio Santos 7'	Stadium: Defensores del Chaco; Referee: Francisco Oscar Lamolina (Argentina)

5 February 1992 1992 Pre-Olympic Tournament	Colombia	2–0	Brazil	Asunción, Paraguay
	Valenciano 40', 67' (pen.)			Stadium: Defensores del Chaco; Referee: Pedro Peña (Bolivia)

9 February 1992 1992 Pre-Olympic Tournament	Venezuela	1–1	Brazil	Asunción, Paraguay
	Rodríguez 37'		Elivélton 68'	Stadium: Defensores del Chaco; Referee: Jorge Nieves (Uruguay)

5 February 1994 Copa de las Américas	Brazil	1–0	Peru	Armenia, Colombia
	Paulo Isidoro			Stadium: Estadio Centenario; Referee: José Luis da Rosa (Uruguay)

8 February 1994 Copa de las Américas	Brazil	0–0	Chile	Pereira, Colombia
				Stadium: Estadio Hernán Ramírez Villegas

12 February 1994 Copa de las Américas	Brazil	1–1	Honduras	Pereira, Colombia
	Alex Alves		Pavón	Stadium: Estadio Hernán Ramírez Villegas

16 February 1994 Copa de las Américas	Uruguay	2–1	Brazil	Armenia, Colombia
	Delgado; Vázquez		Hermes	Stadium: Estadio Centenario; Referee: Aníbal Hay (Argentina)

19 October 1994 Friendly	Chile	0–5	Brazil	Concepción, Chile
			Sávio; Amoroso; Marques	Stadium: Estadio Ester Roa; Referee: Carlos Robles (Chile)

2 March 1995 Copa Mercosur	Brazil	2–0	Uruguay	Mar del Plata, Argentina
	Carlinhos; Silvinho			Stadium: Estadio José María Minella; Referee: E. Jácome (Ecuador)

8 March 1995 1995 Pan American Games	Brazil	2–1	Costa Rica	Tandil, Argentina
	Ronaldo Guiaro 17'; Silvinho 37'	Report	Gómez 85'	Stadium: Estadio Municipal General San Martín; Referee: John J. Toro (Colombia)

13 March 1995 1995 Pan American Games	Brazil	2–0	Bermuda	Tandil, Argentina
	Anderson 22'; Sandro 48'	Report		Stadium: Estadio Municipal General San Martín; Referee: Jim Fleming (Canada)

15 March 1995 1995 Pan American Games	Brazil	1–1	Chile	Tandil, Argentina
	Silvinho 57'	Report	Lobos 69'	Stadium: Estadio Municipal General San Martín; Referee: Ángel Guevara (Ecuador)

18 March 1995 1995 Pan American Games	Brazil	0–0 (a.e.t.) (7–8 p)	Honduras	Mar del Plata, Argentina
		Report		Stadium: Estadio José María Minella; Referee: Ángel Guevara (Ecuador)
	Penalties
	Ronaldo Guiaro (penalty scored); Anderson (penalty scored); Bordon (penalty scored); Alberto (penalty missed); Nenê (penalty missed); Ferreira (penalty missed); Edmílson (penalty scored); Fabrício (penalty scored); Silvinho (penalty scored); Sandro (penalty scored); Adílson (penalty missed)		(penalty scored) Perdomo; (penalty missed) Suazo; (penalty scored) Pavón; (penalty missed) Lagos; (penalty scored) Castro; (penalty missed) Romero; (penalty scored) Pineda; (penalty scored) Luis López; (penalty scored) Sierra; (penalty scored) Guevara; (penalty scored) Milton Flores

25 May 1995 Copa Mercosur	Argentina	1–1 (4–5 p)	Brazil	Buenos Aires, Argentina
	Biagini		Élder	Stadium: Estadio José Amalfitani; Referee: Eduardo Dluznewski (Uruguay)
	Penalties
	Sorín (penalty scored); Arangio (penalty missed); Peña (penalty scored); Biagini (penalty scored); Bayon (penalty scored); Dominguez (penalty missed)		(penalty scored) Dedimar; (penalty missed) Fábio Noronha; (penalty scored) Marcelo Miguel; (penalty scored) Fabio Luis; (penalty scored) Murilo; (penalty scored) Léo Inácio

11 February 1996 Friendly	Brazil	2–0	Bulgaria	Brasília, Brazil
	Sávio 69', 83'	Report		Stadium: Estádio Mané Garrincha; Referee: Antônio Pereira dos Santos (Brazil)

13 February 1996 Friendly	Brazil	1–0	Ukraine	Uberlândia, Brazil
	Sávio 54'	Report		Stadium: Estádio Parque do Sabiá; Referee: Márcio Rezende de Freitas (Brazil)

18 February 1996 1996 Pre-Olympic Tournament	Brazil	4–1	Peru	Tandil, Argentina
	Juninho 41'; Sávio 79' (pen.), 84'; Jamelli 89'		Ferrari 24'	Stadium: Estadio Municipal General San Martín; Referee: Óscar Ruiz (Colombia)

21 February 1996 1996 Pre-Olympic Tournament	Brazil	3–1	Paraguay	Tandil, Argentina
	Souza 30', 77'; Roberto Carlos 68'		Ferreira 65'	Stadium: Estadio Municipal General San Martín; Referee: Javier Castrilli (Argentina)

23 February 1996 1996 Pre-Olympic Tournament	Brazil	4–1	Bolivia	Tandil, Argentina
	Caio		Coimbra	Stadium: Estadio Municipal General San Martín; Referee: Paolo Borgosano (Venezuela)

27 February 1996 1996 Pre-Olympic Tournament	Brazil	0–0	Uruguay	Tandil, Argentina
				Stadium: Estadio Municipal General San Martín; Referee: Óscar Ruiz (Colombia)

1 March 1996 1996 Pre-Olympic Tournament	Brazil	5–0	Venezuela	Tandil, Argentina
	Caio; Zé Maria; Sávio; Flávio Conceição			Stadium: Estadio Municipal General San Martín; Referee: Ángel Guevara (Ecuador)

3 March 1996 1996 Pre-Olympic Tournament	Brazil	3–1	Uruguay	Mar del Plata, Argentina
	Beto; Juninho		Fleurquín	Stadium: Estadio José María Minella; Referee: Epifanio González (Paraguay)

6 March 1996 1996 Pre-Olympic Tournament	Argentina	2–2	Brazil	Mar del Plata, Argentina
	Delgado; Claudio López		Sávio; Beto	Stadium: Estadio José María Minella; Referee: Óscar Ruiz (Colombia)

10 July 1996 Friendly	Brazil	5–1	Denmark	Florianópolis, Brazil
	Bebeto 11'; Rivaldo 19'; Flávio Conceição 34'; Juninho 55'; Ronaldo 73'	Report	Degn 75'	Stadium: Estádio da Ressacada; Referee: Dalmo Bozzano (Brazil)

14 July 1996 Unofficial friendly	Brazil	2–1	(United Nations) Rest of the World	New York City, United States
	Bebeto 48'; Roberto Carlos 78'	Report	Klinsmann 69'	Stadium: Giants Stadium; Attendance: 78,416; Referee: Arturo Brizio (Mexico)

21 July 1996 1996 Olympics	Japan	1–0	Brazil	Miami, United States
18:30	Ito 72'	Report		Stadium: Orange Bowl; Attendance: 46,713; Referee: Benito Archundia (Mexico)

23 July 1996 1996 Olympics	Brazil	3–1	Hungary	Miami, United States
20:30	Ronaldo 35'; Juninho 61'; Bebeto 84'	Report	Madar 58'	Stadium: Orange Bowl; Attendance: 34,871; Referee: Gamal Al-Ghandour (Egypt)

25 July 1996 1996 Olympics	Brazil	1–0	Nigeria	Miami, United States
21:00	Ronaldo 30'	Report		Stadium: Orange Bowl; Attendance: 55,650; Referee: Esfandiar Baharmast (United States)

28 July 1996 1996 Olympics	Brazil	4–2	Ghana	Miami, United States
18:00	Duodu 18' (o.g.); Ronaldo 56', 62'; Bebeto 72''	Report	Akonnor 23'; Aboagye 53'	Stadium: Orange Bowl; Attendance: 45,257; Referee: Pirom Un-prasert (Thailand)

31 July 1996 1996 Olympics	Nigeria	4–3 (asdet)	Brazil	Athens, United States
18:00	Roberto Carlos 20' (o.g.); Ikpeba 78'; Kanu 90', 94'	Report	Flávio Conceição 1', 38'; Bebeto 28'	Stadium: Sanford Stadium; Attendance: 78,587; Referee: Garcia Aranda (Spain)

3 August 1996 1996 Olympics	Brazil	5–0	Portugal	Athens, United States
18:00	Ronaldo 4'; Flávio Conceição 10'; Bebeto 46', 53', 74'	Report		Stadium: Sanford Stadium; Attendance: 68,173; Referee: Gamal Al-Ghandour (Egypt)

7 April 1999 Friendly	Brazil	7–0	United States	Brasília, Brazil
	Denílson; Marcos Paulo; Warley; Roni; Araújo; Rodrigão			Stadium: Estádio Mané Garrincha; Referee: Paulo César de Oliveira (Brazil)

14 November 1999 Friendly	Australia	0–2	Brazil	Sydney, Australia
			Álvaro; Alex	Stadium: Olympic Stadium; Referee: Brett Hugo (Australia)

17 November 1999 Friendly	Australia	2–2	Brazil	Melbourne, Australia
	Agostino		Ronaldinho; Fábio Júnior	Stadium: Melbourne Cricket Ground; Referee: Eddie Lennie (Australia)

10 December 1999 Friendly	Brazil	3–0	Bolivia	Cuiabá, Brazil
	Fábio Júnior; Baiano			Stadium: Verdão; Referee: Wilson de Souza Mendonça (Brazil)

14 December 1999 Friendly	Brazil	3–3	Paraguay	Campo Grande, Brazil
	Fábio Júnior; Fábio Bilica; Adriano		Cangia; Morel Rodríguez; Cuevas	Stadium: Morenão; Referee: Paulo César de Oliveira (Brazil)

== 2000 ==
12 January 2000 Friendly	Brazil	7–0	Trinidad and Tobago	Florianópolis, Brazil
	Álvaro; Ronaldinho; Alex; Mozart; Lucas; Adriano			Stadium: Estádio Orlando Scarpelli; Referee: Carlos Eugênio Simon (Brazil)

15 January 2000 Friendly	Brazil	4–1	Costa Rica	Maringá, Brazil
	Fábio Júnior; Edu		Sensena	Stadium: Estádio Willie Davids; Referee: Oscar Roberto de Godói (Brazil)

19 January 2000 2000 Pre-Olympic Tournament	Brazil	1–1	Chile	Londrina, Brazil
	Alex 63'	Report	Pizarro 79'	Stadium: Estádio do Café; Referee: Carlos Amarilla (Paraguay)

23 January 2000 2000 Pre-Olympic Tournament	Brazil	2–0	Ecuador	Londrina, Brazil
	Ronaldinho 18'; Alex 80'	Report		Stadium: Estádio do Café; Referee: Saúl Feldman (Uruguay)

26 January 2000 2000 Pre-Olympic Tournament	Brazil	3–0	Venezuela	Londrina, Brazil
	Ronaldinho 10', 85' (pen.); Lucas 65'	Report		Stadium: Estádio do Café; Referee: Juan Carlos Paniagua (Bolivia)

30 January 2000 2000 Pre-Olympic Tournament	Brazil	9–0	Colombia	Londrina, Brazil
	Álvaro 8'; Ronaldinho 16', 90' (pen.); Edu 22', 37'; Athirson 44'; Adriano 65'; Lucas 72'; Warley 82'	Report		Stadium: Estádio do Café; Referee: Daniel Gimenez (Argentina)

2 February 2000 2000 Pre-Olympic Tournament	Brazil	4–2	Argentina	Londrina, Brazil
	Ronaldinho 2', 35', 78'; Alex 18'	Report	Romeo 5'; Cambiasso 21'	Stadium: Estádio do Café; Referee: Carlos Amarilla (Paraguay)

4 February 2000 2000 Pre-Olympic Tournament	Brazil	3–1	Chile	Londrina, Brazil
	Athirson 31'; Ronaldinho 46'; Baiano 60'	Report	Tapia 15'	Stadium: Estádio do Café; Referee: Henry Cervantes (Colombia)

6 February 2000 2000 Pre-Olympic Tournament	Brazil	2–2	Uruguay	Londrina, Brazil
	Fábio Bilica 4'; Fábio Júnior 87'	Report	Risso 48'; Varela 59'	Stadium: Estádio do Café; Referee: Juan Carlos Paniagua (Bolivia)

9 August 2000 Friendly	Chile	3–5	Brazil	Ovalle, Chile
	Tapia; Navia		Ronaldinho; Edu; Álvaro; André Luís	Stadium: Estadio Diaguita; Referee: Pablo Pozo (Chile)

12 August 2000 Friendly	Brazil	3–0	Chile	Florianópolis, Brazil
	Fabiano; Roger; Alex			Stadium: Estádio Orlando Scarpelli; Referee: Oscar Roberto de Godói (Brazil)

7 September 2000 Unofficial friendly	Brisbane Strikers FC (Australia)	0–3	Brazil	Gold Coast, Australia
			Roger; Lúcio	Stadium: Carrara Stadium; Referee: Mark Shield (Australia)

10 September 2000 Unofficial friendly	Marconi-Fairfield (Australia)	0–4	Brazil	Sydney, Australia
			Ronaldinho; Geovanni; Lucas	Stadium: Marconi Stadium; Referee: Mark Shield (Australia)

14 September 2000 2000 Olympics	Brazil	3–1	Slovakia	Brisbane, Australia
19:00	Edu 30'; Cisovský 68' (o.g.); Alex 90+1'	Report	Porázik 26'	Stadium: Brisbane Cricket Ground; Attendance: 24.616; Referee: Simon Micallef (Australia)

17 September 2000 2000 Olympics	Brazil	1–3	South Africa	Brisbane, Australia
19:00	Edu 11'	Report	Fortune 10'; Nomvethe 74'; Lekoelea 90'	Stadium: Brisbane Cricket Ground; Attendance: 36.236; Referee: Bruce Grimshaw (New Zealand)

20 September 2000 2000 Olympics	Brazil	1–0	Japan	Brisbane, Australia
19:00	Alex 5'	Report		Stadium: Brisbane Cricket Ground; Attendance: 36.608; Referee: Stéphane Bré (France)

23 September 2000 2000 Olympics	Brazil	1–2 (asdet)	Cameroon	Brisbane, Australia
19:00	Ronaldinho 90+4'	Report	M'Boma 17'; M'Bami 113'	Stadium: Brisbane Cricket Ground; Attendance: 37.332; Referee: Herbert Fandel (Germany)

14 January 2003 Qatar International Tournament	Brazil	1–1	Norway	Doha, Qatar
	Robert		Fazlagic	Stadium: Jassim bin Hamad Stadium; Referee: Shimizu Yamada (Japan)

16 January 2003 Qatar International Tournament	Brazil	2–0	Czech Republic	Doha, Qatar
	Robert; Kaká			Stadium: Jassim bin Hamad Stadium; Referee: Florian Mayer (Germany)

20 January 2003 Qatar International Tournament	Brazil	1–1	Egypt	Doha, Qatar
	Nenê		Wahed	Stadium: Jassim bin Hamad Stadium; Referee: Carlo Bertolini (Switzerland)

22 January 2003 Qatar International Tournament	Brazil	3–2	China	Doha, Qatar
	Kaká; Júlio Baptista		W. Sheng	Stadium: Jassim bin Hamad Stadium; Referee: Natthanai Phanschupar (Thailand)

24 January 2003 Qatar International Tournament	Brazil	4–2	Germany	Doha, Qatar
	Andrezinho; Júlio Baptista; Kaká		Hanke; Volz	Stadium: Jassim bin Hamad Stadium; Referee: Jumaa Mohd Al Ali (Qatar)

3 August 2003 2003 Pan American Games	Brazil	4–0	Colombia	Santo Domingo, Dominican Republic
	Vágner Love 30', 41'; Gabriel 34'; Coelho 65'			Stadium: Estadio Mirador Este; Referee: Germán Arredondo (Mexico)

6 August 2003 2003 Pan American Games	Dominican Republic	0–5	Brazil	Santo Domingo, Dominican Republic
			Dagoberto 5', 22'; Diego 63'; Dudu Cearense 86'; Vágner Love 88'	Stadium: Estadio Mirador Este; Referee: Silviu Petrescu (Canada)

9 August 2003 2003 Pan American Games	Brazil	2–1	Cuba	Santo Domingo, Dominican Republic
	William 62'; Vágner Love 64'		Alcántara 50'	Stadium: Estadio Mirador Este; Referee: William Mathus (Costa Rica)

12 August 2003 2003 Pan American Games	Brazil	1–0	Mexico	Santo Domingo, Dominican Republic
	Dagoberto 87'			Stadium: Estadio Olimpico Félix Sánchez; Referee: Silviu Petrescu (Canada)

15 August 2003 2003 Pan American Games	Argentina	1–0	Brazil	Santo Domingo, Dominican Republic
	Maxi López 45'			Stadium: Estadio Olimpico Félix Sánchez; Referee: Peter Prendergast (Jamaica)

15 November 2003 Unofficial friendly	Brazil	2–0	(Brazil) Corinthians	São José do Rio Preto, Brazil
	Robinho; Edu Dracena			Stadium: Teixeirão; Referee: Sálvio Spínola (Brazil)

18 November 2003 Unofficial friendly	Brazil	3–1	(Brazil) Santos	Santos, Brazil
	Robinho; Marcel		Pereira	Stadium: Vila Belmiro; Referee: Cléber Wellington Abade (Brazil)

7 January 2004 2004 Pre-Olympic Tournament	Brazil	4–0	Venezuela	Concepción, Chile
22:00	Diego 47'; Dagoberto 58'; Robinho 83' (pen.); Marcel 89'	Report		Stadium: Estadio Ester Roa; Attendance: 20.000; Referee: Fernando Paneso (Colombia)

9 January 2004 2004 Pre-Olympic Tournament	Brazil	3–0	Paraguay	Concepción, Chile
22:00	Diego 8' (pen.); Robinho 51' (pen.); Maicon 53'	Report		Stadium: Estadio Ester Roa; Attendance: 14.000; Referee: Gilberto Hidalgo (Peru)

11 January 2004 2004 Pre-Olympic Tournament	Brazil	1–1	Uruguay	Concepción, Chile
16:00	Robinho 41'	Report	Vigneri 37'	Stadium: Estadio Ester Roa; Attendance: 15.000; Referee: Claudio Martín (Argentina)

15 January 2004 2004 Pre-Olympic Tournament	Chile	1–1	Brazil	Concepción, Chile
22:00	Beausejour 63'	Report	Alex 19'	Stadium: Estadio Ester Roa; Attendance: 33.000; Referee: Claudio Martín (Argentina)

18 January 2004 2004 Pre-Olympic Tournament	Brazil	3–0	Colombia	Valparaíso, Chile
17:00	Alex 11'; Marcel 46'; Dudu Cearense 81'	Report		Stadium: Estadio Playa Ancha; Attendance: 10.000; Referee: Gustavo Méndez (Uruguay)

21 January 2004 2004 Pre-Olympic Tournament	Argentina	1–0	Brazil	Valparaíso, Chile
23:00	G. Rodríguez 77'	Report		Stadium: Estadio Playa Ancha; Attendance: 16.500; Referee: Gilberto Hidalgo (Peru)

23 January 2004 2004 Pre-Olympic Tournament	Chile	1–3	Brazil	Viña del Mar, Chile
22:00	M. González 30'	Report	Marcel 5'; Dudu Cearense 51'; Diego 55'	Stadium: Estadio Sausalito; Attendance: 15.300; Referee: Luis Solórzano (Venezuela)

25 January 2004 2004 Pre-Olympic Tournament	Paraguay	1–0	Brazil	Viña del Mar, Chile
17:00	Devaca 32'	Report		Stadium: Estadio Sausalito; Attendance: 9.000; Referee: Gustavo Méndez (Paraguay)

15 July 2007 2007 Pan American Games	Brazil	3–0	Honduras	Rio de Janeiro, Brazil
	Lulinha 22' (pen.), 66', 90' (pen.)			Stadium: Estádio Engenhão; Referee: Fernando Cabrera (Uruguay)

18 July 2007 2007 Pan American Games	Brazil	2–0	Costa Rica	Rio de Janeiro, Brazil
	Maicon 18'; Alex Teixeira 24'			Stadium: Estádio Engenhão; Referee: Pablo Pozo (Chile)

21 July 2007 2007 Pan American Games	Brazil	2–4	Ecuador	Rio de Janeiro, Brazil
	Luiz Júnior 37'; Alex Teixeira 71'		Chasi 45'; Zura 47'; Montero 62'; Ochoa 86'	Stadium: Estádio do Maracanã; Referee: Pablo Lunati (Argentina)

9 December 2007 Unofficial friendly	Brazil	0–3	(Brazil) Campeonato Brasileiro XI	Rio de Janeiro, Brazil
		Report	Acosta 40'; Ibson 47'; Leandro Amaral 63'	Stadium: Estádio Engenhão; Referee: Leonardo Gaciba (Brazil)

22 June 2008 Unofficial friendly	Brazil	1–0	(Rio de Janeiro (state)) Rio de Janeiro	Volta Redonda, Brazil
	Alexandre Pato 7'	Report		Stadium: Estádio Raulino de Oliveira; Attendance: 11.503; Referee: Marcelo de Lima Henrique (Brazil)

28 July 2008 Friendly	Singapore	0–3	Brazil	Kallang, Singapore
			Ronaldinho; Diego; Jô	Stadium: National Stadium; Referee: Abdul Malik (Singapore)

1 August 2008 Friendly	Vietnam	0–2	Brazil	Hanoi, Vietnam
			Alexandre Pato; Thiago Neves	Stadium: Mỹ Đình National Stadium; Referee: Veerapool Prayoon (Thailand)

7 August 2008 2008 Olympics	Brazil	1–0	Belgium	Shenyang, China
17:00	Hernanes 79'	Report		Stadium: Shenyang Olympic Stadium; Attendance: 39.661; Referee: Khalil Al Ghamdi (Saudi Arabia)

10 August 2008 2008 Olympics	Brazil	5–0	New Zealand	Shenyang, China
17:00	Anderson 3'; Alexandre Pato 33'; Ronaldinho 55', 61' (pen.); Rafael Sóbis 90+3'	Report		Stadium: Shenyang Olympic Stadium; Attendance: 44.951; Referee: Stéphane Lannoy (France)

13 August 2008 2008 Olympics	China	0–3	Brazil	Qinhuangdao, China
19:45		Report	Diego 18'; Thiago Neves 69', 73'	Stadium: Qinhuangdao Olympic Sports Center Stadium; Attendance: 38.790; Referee: Jerome Damon (South Africa)

16 August 2008 2008 Olympics	Brazil	2–0 (a.e.t.)	Cameroon	Shenyang, China
18:00	Rafael Sóbis 101'; Marcelo 105'	Report		Stadium: Shenyang Olympic Stadium; Attendance: 41.043; Referee: Damir Skomina (Slovenia)

19 August 2008 2008 Olympics	Argentina	3–0	Brazil	Beijing, China
21:00	Agüero 52', 58'; Riquelme 76' (pen.)	Report		Stadium: Beijing Workers' Stadium; Attendance: 52.968; Referee: Martín Vázquez (Uruguay)

22 August 2008 2008 Olympics	Belgium	0–3	Brazil	Shanghai, China
19:00		Report	Diego 27'; Jô 45', 90+2'	Stadium: Shanghai Stadium; Attendance: 50.705; Referee: Thomas Einwaller (Austria)

== 2010 ==
19 October 2011 2011 Pan American Games	Argentina	1–1	Brazil	Zapopan, Mexico
17:00	Araujo 74'		Henrique Almeida 63'	Stadium: Estadio Omnilife; Referee: Omar Ponce (Ecuador)

21 October 2011 2011 Pan American Games	Cuba	0–0	Brazil	Zapopan, Mexico
17:00				Stadium: Estadio Omnilife; Referee: Raúl Orosco (Bolivia)

23 October 2011 2011 Pan American Games	Costa Rica	3–1	Brazil	Zapopan, Mexico
20:00	B. Vega 1'; McDonald 20', 43'		Henrique Almeida 30'	Stadium: Estadio Omnilife; Referee: Ricardo Arellano (Mexico)

20 July 2012 Friendly	Great Britain	0–2	Brazil	Middlesbrough, England
		Report	Sandro 12'; Neymar 34' (pen.)	Stadium: Riverside Stadium; Referee: Clément Turpin (France)

26 July 2012 2012 Olympics	Brazil	3–2	Egypt	Cardiff, Wales
19:45	Rafael 16'; Leandro Damião 26'; Neymar 30'	Report	Aboutrika 52'; Salah 76'	Stadium: Millennium Stadium; Attendance: 26.812; Referee: Gianluca Rocchi (Italy)

29 July 2012 2012 Olympics	Brazil	3–1	Belarus	Manchester, England
15:00	Alexandre Pato 15'; Neymar 65'; Oscar 90+3'	Report	Bressan 8'	Stadium: Old Trafford; Attendance: 66.212; Referee: Yuichi Nishimura (Japan)

1 August 2012 2012 Olympics	Brazil	3–0	New Zealand	Newcastle, England
14:30	Danilo 23'; Leandro Damião 29'; Sandro 52'	Report		Stadium: St James' Park; Attendance: 25.201; Referee: Bakary Gassama (The Gambia)

4 August 2012 2012 Olympics	Brazil	3–2	Honduras	Newcastle, England
17:00	Leandro Damião 38', 60'; Neymar 50' (pen.)	Report	Martínez 12'; Espinoza 48'	Stadium: St James' Park; Attendance: 42.166; Referee: Felix Brych (Germany)

7 August 2012 2012 Olympics	South Korea	0–3	Brazil	Manchester, England
19:45		Report	Rômulo 38'; Leandro Damião 57', 64'	Stadium: Old Trafford; Attendance: 69.689; Referee: Pavel Královec (Czech Republic)

11 August 2012 2012 Olympics	Mexico	2–1	Brazil	London, England
15:00	Peralta 1', 75'	Report	Hulk 90+1'	Stadium: Wembley Stadium; Attendance: 86.162; Referee: Mark Clattenburg (England)

26 January 2014 Friendly	Brazil	1–1	Mexico	Santos, Brazil
	Vinícius Araújo		Gracia	Stadium: Vila Belmiro

3 September 2014 Friendly	Qatar	0–4	Brazil	Doha, Qatar
			Dória; Ademilson; Vinícius Araújo	Stadium: Grand Hamad Stadium; Referee: Ahmed Al Kaaf (Oman)

6 September 2014 Friendly	Palestine	0–3	Brazil	Doha, Qatar
			Ademilson; Dória; Vinícius Araújo	Stadium: Thani bin Jassim Stadium; Referee: Ahmed Al Kaaf (Oman)

9 September 2014 Friendly	Lebanon	2–2	Brazil	Doha, Qatar
	Ghaddar; Maatouk		Ademilson; Vinícius Araújo	Stadium: Thani bin Jassim Stadium; Referee: Abbas Al-Shumari (Kuwait)

10 October 2014 Friendly	Brazil	3–1	Bolivia	Cuiabá, Brazil
	Thalles; Luan		Lizio	Stadium: Arena Pantanal; Referee: Fernando Rapallini (Argentina)

13 October 2014 Friendly	Brazil	3–0	United States	Brasília, Brazil
	Luan; Douglas Coutinho; Vinícius Araújo			Stadium: Estádio Mané Garrincha; Referee: Omar Ponce (Ecuador)

14 November 2014 Wuhan Youth Soccer Tournament	Australia	2–2	Brazil	Wuhan, China
	Gameiro; Amini		Vinícius Araújo	Stadium: Wuhan Sports Center

16 November 2014 Wuhan Youth Soccer Tournament	South Korea	0–3	Brazil	Wuhan, China
			Felipe Anderson; Felipe Gedoz; Ryder Matos	Stadium: Wuhan Sports Center

18 November 2014 Wuhan Youth Soccer Tournament	China	1–2	Brazil	Wuhan, China
	L. Lisheng		Lucas Evangelista; Wellington Silva	Stadium: Wuhan Sports Center

27 March 2015 Friendly	Brazil	4–1	Paraguay	Cariacica, Brazil
21:50	Lucas Silva 15'; Vitinho 42', 58'; Anderson Talisca 64'	Report	C. Domínguez 52'	Stadium: Estádio Kléber Andrade; Referee: Darío Herrera (Argentina)

29 March 2015 Friendly	Brazil	0–0	Mexico	Fortaleza, Brazil
				Stadium: Castelão; Referee: Fernando Falce (Uruguay)

12 July 2015 2015 Pan American Games	Canada	1–4	Brazil	Hamilton, Canada
20:35	Babouli 58'	Report	Luciano 7'; Rômulo 38'; Clayton 47'; Erik 89'	Stadium: Hamilton Pan Am Soccer Stadium; Referee: José Peñaloza (Mexico)

16 July 2015 2015 Pan American Games	Brazil	4–0	Peru	Hamilton, Canada
17:35	Luan 3'; Clayton 20'; Rômulo 26'; Dodô 30'	Report		Stadium: Hamilton Pan Am Soccer Stadium; Referee: Raúl Castro (Honduras)

20 July 2015 2015 Pan American Games	Brazil	3–3	Panama	Hamilton, Canada
17:35	Luciano 24', 25'; Clayton 37'	Report	Aguilar 40', 51'; Escobar 56' (pen.)	Stadium: Hamilton Pan Am Soccer Stadium; Referee: José Peñaloza (Mexico)

23 July 2015 2015 Pan American Games	Uruguay	2–1	Brazil	Hamilton, Canada
17:35	Schettino 86'; Santos 87'	Report	Clayton 75'	Stadium: Hamilton Pan Am Soccer Stadium; Referee: José Peñaloza (Mexico)

25 July 2015 2015 Pan American Games	Panama	1–3 (a.e.t.)	Brazil	Hamilton, Canada
13:00	Núñez 45+2'	Report	Luciano 76' (pen.), 115' (pen.); Lucas Piazon 99'	Stadium: Hamilton Pan Am Soccer Stadium; Referee: Valdin Legister (Jamaica)

8 September 2015 Friendly	France	2–1	Brazil	Le Mans, France
	Amavi 16'; Haller 81'		Kimpembe 14' (o.g.)	Stadium: MMArena; Referee: Tore Hansen (Norway)

9 October 2015 Friendly	Brazil	6–0	Dominican Republic	Manaus, Brazil
20:00	Gabriel Jesus 11'; Maicon 27'; Luan 29'; Valdívia 66'; Fred 78'; Gabriel Barbosa 89'	Report		Stadium: Arena da Amazônia; Attendance: 19.537; Referee: Ulises Mereles (Paraguay)

12 October 2015 Friendly	Brazil	5–1	Haiti	Manaus, Brazil
19:00	Maicon 35'; Vinícius Araújo 41'; Gabriel Jesus 50'; Gabriel Barbosa 83' (pen.), 86'	Report	Belfort 87'	Stadium: Arena da Amazônia; Attendance: 27.000; Referee: Mario Díaz (Paraguay)

11 November 2015 Friendly	Brazil	2–1	United States	Recife, Brazil
	Gabriel Barbosa 42'; Luan 46'	Report	Kiesewetter 59' (pen.)	Stadium: Ilha do Retiro; Attendance: 6.903; Referee: Jorge Mancilla (Bolivia)

15 November 2015 Friendly	Brazil	5–1	United States	Belém, Brazil
	Gabriel Barbosa; Felipe Anderson; Luan		Marlon (o.g.)	Stadium: Mangueirão; Referee: Jesus Valenzuela (Venezuela)

24 March 2016 Friendly	Brazil	0–1	Nigeria	Cariacica, Brazil
		Report	Ekpai 2'	Stadium: Estádio Kléber Andrade; Attendance: 7.000; Referee: Ulises Mereles (Paraguay)

27 March 2016 Friendly	Brazil	3–1	South Africa	Maceió, Brazil
	Rodrigo Caio 14'; Fabinho 20'; Andreas Pereira 44'		Mothiba 65'	Stadium: Estádio Rei Pelé; Referee: Esteban Vega (Uruguay)

30 July 2016 Friendly	Brazil	2–0	Japan	Goiânia, Brazil
	Gabriel Barbosa 30'; Marquinhos 38'	Report		Stadium: Estádio Serra Dourada; Referee: Wilson Riveros (Colombia)

4 August 2016 2016 Olympics	Brazil	0–0	South Africa	Brasília, Brazil
16:00		Report		Stadium: Estádio Mané Garrincha; Attendance: 69.389; Referee: Antonio Mateu Lahoz (Spain)

7 August 2016 2016 Olympics	Brazil	0–0	Iraq	Brasília, Brazil
22:00		Report		Stadium: Estádio Mané Garrincha; Attendance: 65.829; Referee: Ovidiu Hațegan (Romania)

10 August 2016 2016 Olympics	Brazil	4–0	Denmark	Salvador, Brazil
22:00	Gabriel Barbosa 26', 80'; Gabriel Jesus 40'; Luan 50'	Report		Stadium: Itaipava Arena Fonte Nova; Attendance: 41.067; Referee: Alireza Faghani (Iran)

13 August 2016 2016 Olympics	Brazil	2–0	Colombia	São Paulo, Brazil
22:00	Neymar 12'; Luan 83'	Report		Stadium: Arena Corinthians; Attendance: 41.450; Referee: Cüneyt Çakır (Turkey)

17 August 2016 2016 Olympics	Brazil	6–0	Honduras	Rio de Janeiro, Brazil
13:00	Neymar 1', 90+1' (pen.); Gabriel Jesus 26', 35'; Marquinhos 51'; Luan 79'	Report		Stadium: Estádio do Maracanã; Attendance: 52.457; Referee: Ovidiu Hațegan (Romania)

20 August 2016 2016 Olympics	Brazil	1–1 (a.e.t.) (5–4 p)	Germany	Rio de Janeiro, Brazil
17:30	Neymar 27'	Report	Meyer 59'	Stadium: Estádio do Maracanã; Attendance: 62.707; Referee: Alireza Faghani (Iran)
	Penalties
	Renato Augusto (penalty scored); Marquinhos (penalty scored); Rafinha (penalty scored); Luan (penalty scored); Neymar (penalty scored)		(penalty scored) Ginter; (penalty scored) Gnabry; (penalty scored) Brandt; (penalty scored) Süle; (penalty missed) Petersen

2 June 2019 2019 Toulon Tournament	Brazil	4–0	Guatemala	Aubagne, France
	Pedrinho 19'; Bruno Tabata 23'; Wendel 85'; Douglas Luiz 89' (pen.)	Report		Stadium: Stade de Lattre-de-Tassigny; Referee: Willy Delajod (France)

5 June 2019 2019 Toulon Tournament	France	0–4	Brazil	Salon-de-Provence, France
		Report	Antony 20'; Matheus Henrique 57'; Matheus Cunha 88' (pen.); Mateus Vital 90+1'	Stadium: Stade d'Honneur Marcel Roustan; Referee: Luis Enrique Santander (Mexico)

8 June 2019 2019 Toulon Tournament	Brazil	5–0	Qatar	Vitrolles, France
	Matheus Cunha 21', 83'; Mateus Vital 24' (pen.); Paulinho 38', 76'	Report		Stadium: Stade Jules-Ladoumègue; Referee: António Nobre (Portugal)

12 June 2019 2019 Toulon Tournament	Brazil	2–0	Republic of Ireland	Aubagne, France
	Paulinho 15'; Matheus Cunha 47'	Report		Stadium: Stade de Lattre-de-Tassigny; Referee: Luis Enrique Santander (Mexico)

15 June 2019 2019 Toulon Tournament	Brazil	1–1 (5–4 p)	Japan	Salon-de-Provence, France
	Antony 19'	Report	Ogawa 39'	Stadium: Stade d'Honneur Marcel Roustan; Referee: António Nobre (Portugal)
	Penalties
	Mateus Vital (penalty scored); Douglas Luiz (penalty scored); Matheus Henrique (penalty scored); Wendel (penalty scored); Lyanco (penalty scored)		(penalty scored) Soma; (penalty scored) Mitoma; (penalty scored) Kamiya; (penalty scored) Naganuma; (penalty missed) Hatate

5 September 2019 Friendly	Brazil	2–0	Colombia	São Paulo, Brazil
	Pedrinho 15'; Matheus Cunha 42'	Report		Stadium: Estádio do Pacaembu; Attendance: 2.165; Referee: Cristian Garay (Chile)

9 September 2019 Friendly	Brazil	3–1	Chile	São Paulo, Brazil
	Matheus Cunha 13', 52'; Antony 61'	Report	Dávila 36' (pen.)	Stadium: Estádio do Pacaembu; Attendance: 5.059; Referee: Guillermo Guerrero (Colombia)

11 October 2019 Friendly	Brazil	4–1	Venezuela	Recife, Brazil
	Douglas Luiz 23'; Antony 50', 53'; Pedro 74'	Report	Cásseres 36'	Stadium: Estádio dos Aflitos; Referee: Facundo Tello (Argentina)

14 October 2019 Friendly	Brazil	2–3	Japan	São Lourenço da Mata, Brazil
	Matheus Cunha 14'; Pedro 82'	Report	Tanaka 27', 51'; Nakayama 67'	Stadium: Arena Pernambuco; Referee: Andrés Matonte (Uruguay)

15 November 2019 United International Football Festival	Brazil	1–0	United States	Las Palmas, Spain
	Matheus Cunha 16'	Report		Stadium: Estadio Gran Canaria; Referee: Juan Pulido (Spain)

17 November 2019 United International Football Festival	Argentina	1–0	Brazil	Las Palmas, Spain
	Capaldo 5'	Report		Stadium: Estadio Gran Canaria; Referee: Gamaliel Escobar López (Spain)

== 2020 ==
19 January 2020 2020 Pre-Olympic Tournament	Brazil	1–0	Peru	Armenia, Colombia
20:30 COT (UTC−5)	Paulinho 43'	Report		Stadium: Estadio Centenario; Referee: Ángel Arteaga (Venezuela)

22 January 2020 2020 Pre-Olympic Tournament	Brazil	3–1	Uruguay	Pereira, Colombia
20:30	Pedrinho 14'; Matheus Cunha 31' (pen.); Pepê 77'	Report	Bueno 80'	Stadium: Estadio Hernán Ramírez Villegas; Referee: Facundo Tello (Argentina)

28 January 2020 2020 Pre-Olympic Tournament	Brazil	5–3	Bolivia	Armenia, Colombia
20:30 COT	Antony 3'; Matheus Cunha 16'; Guga 39'; Reinier 61'; Pepê 90+5'	Report	Abrego 20', 71'; Reyes 79'	Stadium: Estadio Centenario; Referee: Facundo Tello (Argentina)

31 January 2020 2020 Pre-Olympic Tournament	Brazil	2–1	Paraguay	Armenia, Colombia
20:30 COT	Paulinho 75'; Pepê 89'	Report	R. Fernández 61'	Stadium: Estadio Centenario; Referee: Piero Maza (Chile)

3 February 2020 2020 Pre-Olympic Tournament	Brazil	1–1	Colombia	Bucaramanga, Colombia
20:30	Matheus Cunha 71'	Report	Cetré 27'	Stadium: Estadio Alfonso López; Referee: Ángel Arteaga (Venezuela)

6 February 2020 2020 Pre-Olympic Tournament	Brazil	1–1	Uruguay	Bucaramanga, Colombia
18:00	De Arruabarrena 40' (o.g.)	Report	Ugarte 35'	Stadium: Estadio Alfonso López; Referee: Eber Aquino (Paraguay)

9 February 2020 2020 Pre-Olympic Tournament	Argentina	0–3	Brazil	Bucaramanga, Colombia
20:30		Report	Paulinho 13'; Matheus Cunha 30', 55'	Stadium: Estadio Alfonso López; Referee: Alexis Herrera (Venezuela)

14 November 2020 Friendly	Brazil	3–1	South Korea	Cairo, Egypt
14:00 (UTC+2)	Matheus Cunha 42'; Rodrygo 61'; Reinier 73'	Report	Lee Dong-gyeong 7'	Stadium: Al Salam Stadium; Attendance: 0

17 November 2020 Friendly	Egypt	2–1	Brazil	Cairo, Egypt
20:00 (UTC+2)	El Eraki 48'; Yasser 56'	Report	Matheus Cunha 17'	Stadium: Cairo International Stadium; Attendance: 0

5 June 2021 Friendly	Brazil	1–2	Cape Verde	Belgrade, Serbia
21:00 UTC+2	Pedro 38' (pen.)	Report	L. Semedo 45'; W. Semedo 83'	Stadium: Partizan Stadium; Attendance: 0 Referee: Novak Simović (Serbia)

8 June 2021 Friendly	Serbia	0–3	Brazil	Belgrade, Serbia
21:00 UTC+2		Report	Arana 34'; Pedro 75', 77'	Stadium: Rajko Mitić Stadium; Attendance: 0 Referee: Miloš Ðordic (Serbia)

15 July 2021 Friendly	Brazil	5–2	United Arab Emirates	Novi Sad, Serbia
21:00 UTC+2	Diego Carlos 43'; Reinier 78'; Martinelli 82'; Matheus Cunha 84', 90+1'	Report	Nino 21' (o.g.); Al-Naqbi 67'	Stadium: Karađorđe Stadium; Attendance: 0 Referee: Marko Ivković (Serbia)

22 July 2021 2020 Olympics	Brazil	4–2	Germany	Yokohama, Japan
17:30 UTC+9	Richarlison 7', 22', 30'; Paulinho 90+5'	Report	Amiri 57'; Ache 84'	Stadium: International Stadium Yokohama; Attendance: 0 Referee: Iván Barton (El Salvador)

25 July 2021 2020 Olympics	Brazil	0–0	Ivory Coast	Yokohama, Japan
17:30 UTC+9		Report		Stadium: International Stadium Yokohama; Attendance: 0 Referee: Ismail Elfath (United States)

28 July 2021 2020 Olympics	Saudi Arabia	1–3	Brazil	Saitama, Japan
17:00 UTC+9	Al-Amri 27'	Report	Matheus Cunha 14'; Richarlison 76', 90+1'	Stadium: Saitama Stadium 2002; Attendance: 0 Referee: Bamlak Tessema Weyesa (Ethiopia)

31 July 2021 2020 Olympics	Brazil	1–0	Egypt	Saitama, Japan
19:00 UTC+9	Matheus Cunha 37'	Report		Stadium: Saitama Stadium 2002; Attendance: 0 Referee: Chris Beath (Australia)

3 August 2021 2020 Olympics	Mexico	0–0 (a.e.t.) (1–4 p)	Brazil	Kashima, Japan
17:00 UTC+9		Report		Stadium: Kashima Stadium; Attendance: 0 Referee: Georgi Kabakov (Bulgaria)
	Penalties
	Aguirre (penalty missed); Vásquez (penalty missed); Rodríguez (penalty scored)		(penalty scored) Dani Alves; (penalty scored) Martinelli; (penalty scored) Bruno Guimarães; (penalty scored) Reinier

7 August 2021 2020 Olympics	Brazil	2–1 (a.e.t.)	Spain	Yokohama, Japan
20:30 UTC+9	Matheus Cunha 45+2'; Malcom 108'	Report	Oyarzabal 61'	Stadium: International Stadium Yokohama; Attendance: 0 Referee: Chris Beath (Australia)

7 September 2023 Friendly	Morocco	1–0	Brazil	Fez, Morocco
20:00 UTC+1	El Ouahdi 72'	Report		Stadium: Fez Stadium; Referee: Sow Sandigui (Senegal)

23 October 2023 2023 Pan American Games	Brazil	1–0	United States	Valparaíso, Chile
18:00 UTC−3	Miranda 86'	Report		Stadium: Estadio Elías Figueroa Brander; Referee: José Matos Uzcategui (Venezuela)

26 October 2023 2023 Pan American Games	Brazil	2–0	Colombia	Viña del Mar, Chile
20:00 UTC−3	Biro 16'; Pirani 51'	Report		Stadium: Estadio Sausalito; Referee: José Burgos (Uruguay)

29 October 2023 2023 Pan American Games	Brazil	3–0	Honduras	Viña del Mar, Chile
13:00 UTC−3	Ronald 50'; Martins 54'; Lara 79'	Report		Stadium: Estadio Sausalito; Referee: José Matos Uzcategui (Venezuela)

1 November 2023 2023 Pan American Games	Mexico	0–1	Brazil	Viña del Mar, Chile
20:00 UTC−3		Report	Leone 2' (o.g.)	Stadium: Estadio Sausalito; Referee: Bryan Loayza (Ecuador)

4 November 2023 2023 Pan American Games	Chile	1–1 (a.e.t.) (2–4 p)	Brazil	Viña del Mar, Chile
20:00 UTC−3	Guerrero 42'	Report	Ronald 83'	Stadium: Estadio Sausalito; Referee: Yender Herrera Toledo (Venezuela)
	Penalties
	Zaldivia (penalty scored); Villagra (penalty missed); Fuentes (penalty scored); Montes (penalty missed)		(penalty scored) Nascimento; (penalty scored) Ronald; (penalty missed) Figueiredo; (penalty scored) Miranda; (penalty scored) Mycael

23 January 2024 2024 Pre-Olympic Tournament	Bolivia	0–1	Brazil	Caracas, Venezuela
16:00 UTC−4		Report	Endrick 4'	Stadium: Estadio Brígido Iriarte; Referee: Derlis López (Paraguay)

26 January 2024 2024 Pre-Olympic Tournament	Brazil	2–0	Colombia	Caracas, Venezuela
19:00 UTC−4	Endrick 25'; Kennedy 83'	Report		Stadium: Estadio Brígido Iriarte; Referee: Cristián Garay (Chile)

29 January 2024 2024 Pre-Olympic Tournament	Brazil	2–1	Ecuador	Caracas, Venezuela
16:00 UTC−4	Gomes 65'; Pirani 75'	Report	P. Mercado 59'	Stadium: Estadio Brígido Iriarte; Referee: Gustavo Tejera (Uruguay)

1 February 2024 2024 Pre-Olympic Tournament	Venezuela	3–1	Brazil	Caracas, Venezuela
19:00 UTC−4	Segovia 10', 31'; Rikelme 55' (o.g.)	Report	Alexsander 90'	Stadium: Estadio Brígido Iriarte; Referee: Cristián Garay (Chile)

5 February 2024 2024 Pre-Olympic Tournament	Brazil	0–1	Paraguay	Caracas, Venezuela
16:00 UTC−4		Report	Peralta 45+2'	Stadium: Estadio Brígido Iriarte; Referee: Roberto Pérez (Peru)

8 February 2024 2024 Pre-Olympic Tournament	Venezuela	1–2	Brazil	Caracas, Venezuela
19:00 UTC−4	Bolívar 67'	Report	Maurício 57'; Biro 88'	Stadium: Estadio Brígido Iriarte; Referee: Gery Vargas (Bolivia)

11 February 2024 2024 Pre-Olympic Tournament	Brazil	0–1	Argentina	Caracas, Venezuela
16:30 UTC−4		Report	Gondou 78'	Stadium: Estadio Brígido Iriarte; Referee: Cristián Garay (Chile)

== Record by opponent ==
Positive Record Neutral Record Negative Record

Opponent	Pld	W	D	L	GF	GA	GD	Win %
Argentina	12	2	3	7	12	16	–4	16.65%
Australia	3	1	2	0	6	4	+2	33.33%
Belarus	1	1	0	0	3	1	+2	100.00%
Belgium	2	2	0	0	4	0	+4	100.00%
Bermuda	1	1	0	0	2	0	+2	100.00%
Bolivia	5	5	0	0	16	5	+11	100.00%
Bulgaria	1	1	0	0	2	0	+2	100.00%
Cameroon	2	1	0	1	3	2	+1	50.00%
Canada	1	1	0	0	4	1	+3	100.00%
Cape Verde	1	0	0	1	1	2	–1	0.00%
Chile	11	6	5	0	26	10	+16	54.55%
China	3	3	0	0	8	3	+5	100.00%
Colombia	9	7	1	1	25	3	+22	77.77%
Costa Rica	4	3	0	1	9	5	+4	75.00%
Cuba	2	1	1	0	2	1	+1	50.00%
Czech Republic	1	1	0	0	2	0	+2	100.00%
Denmark	2	2	0	0	9	1	+8	100.00%
Dominican Republic	2	2	0	0	11	0	+11	100.00%
Ecuador	3	2	0	1	6	5	+1	66.66%
Egypt	4	2	1	1	6	5	+1	50.00%
France	2	1	0	1	5	2	+3	50.00%
Germany	3	2	1	0	9	5	+4	66.66%
Ghana	1	1	0	0	4	2	+2	100.00%
Great Britain	1	1	0	0	2	0	+2	100.00%
Guatemala	1	1	0	0	4	0	+4	100.00%
Haiti	1	1	0	0	5	1	+4	100.00%
Honduras	6	4	2	0	16	3	+13	88.99%
Hungary	1	1	0	0	3	1	+2	100.00%
Iraq	1	0	1	0	0	0	0	0.00%
Ivory Coast	1	0	1	0	0	0	0	0.00%
Japan	5	2	1	2	6	5	+1	40.00%
Lebanon	1	0	1	0	2	2	0	0.00%
Mexico	5	2	3	1	4	3	+1	33.33%
Morocco	1	0	0	1	0	1	–1	0.00%
New Zealand	2	2	0	0	8	0	+8	100.00%
Nigeria	3	1	0	2	4	5	–1	33.33%
Norway	1	0	1	0	1	1	0	0.00%
Palestine	1	1	0	0	3	0	+3	100.00%
Panama	2	1	1	0	7	4	+3	50.00%
Paraguay	8	5	1	2	16	8	+7	62.50%
Peru	5	5	0	0	12	2	+10	100.00%
Portugal	1	1	0	0	5	0	+5	100.00%
Qatar	2	2	0	0	9	0	+9	100.00%
Republic of Ireland	1	1	0	0	2	0	+2	100.00%
Saudi Arabia	1	1	0	0	3	1	+2	100.00%
Serbia	1	1	0	0	3	0	+3	100.00%
Singapore	1	1	0	0	3	0	+3	100.00%
Slovakia	1	1	0	0	3	1	+2	100.00%
South Africa	3	1	1	1	4	4	0	33.33%
South Korea	3	3	0	0	9	1	+8	100.00%
Spain	1	1	0	0	2	1	+1	100.00%
Trinidad and Tobago	1	1	0	0	7	0	+7	100.00%
Ukraine	1	1	0	0	1	0	+1	100.00%
United Arab Emirates	1	1	0	0	5	2	+3	100.00%
United States	7	7	0	0	22	2	+20	100.00%
Uruguay	11	4	4	3	16	13	+3	36.36%
Venezuela	7	5	1	1	20	6	+14	71.42%
Vietnam	1	1	0	0	2	0	+2	100.00%
Total (58)	167	109	31	27	383	140	+243	65.26%
