= 2024 CONMEBOL Pre-Olympic Tournament =

15th edition of the CONMEBOL Pre-Olympic Tournament

CONMEBOL Preolímpico Venezuela 2024
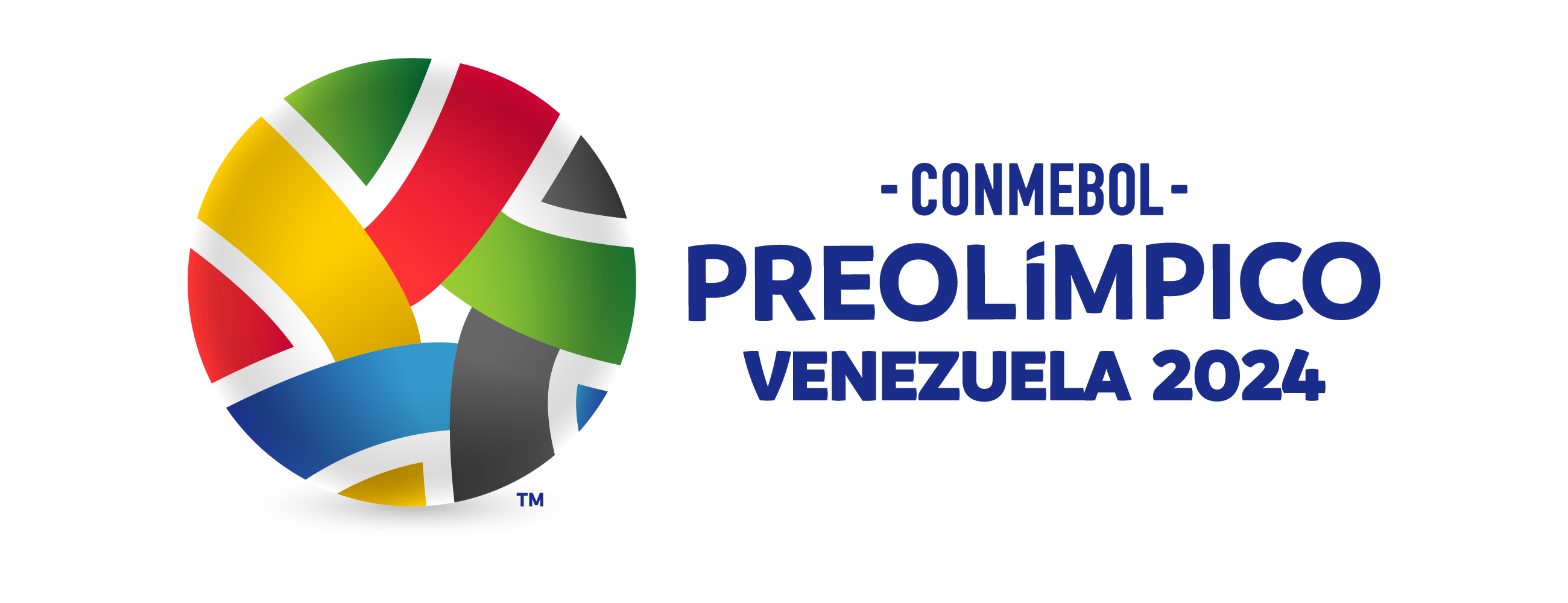

Tournament details
- Host country: Venezuela
- Dates: 20 January – 11 February
- Teams: 10 (from 1 confederation)
- Venue: 2 (in 2 host cities)

Final positions
- Champions: Paraguay (2nd title)
- Runners-up: Argentina
- Third place: Brazil
- Fourth place: Venezuela

Tournament statistics
- Matches played: 26
- Goals scored: 74 (2.85 per match)
- Top scorer(s): (Argentina) Thiago Almada (Paraguay) Diego Gómez (Uruguay) Luciano Rodríguez (5 goals each)

The 2024 CONMEBOL Pre-Olympic Tournament (Spanish: Torneo Preolímpico Sudamericano, Portuguese: Torneio Pré-Olímpico Sul-Americano) was the 14th edition of the CONMEBOL Pre-Olympic Tournament, the quadrennial, international, age-restricted football tournament organised by the South American Football Confederation (CONMEBOL) to determine which men's under-23 national teams from the South American region qualify for the Olympic football tournament. It was held in Venezuela from 20 January to 11 February 2024.

The top two teams qualified for the 2024 Summer Olympics men's football tournament in France as the CONMEBOL representatives.

== Teams ==
All ten CONMEBOL member national teams entered the tournament.

Team	Appearance	Previous best top-4 performance
Argentina (holders)	11th	Winners (1960, 1964, 1980, 2004, 2020)
Bolivia	8th	Third place (1987)
Brazil	13th	Winners (1968, 1971, 1976, 1984, 1987, 1996, 2000)
Chile	12th	Runners-up (1984, 2000)
Colombia	13th	Runners-up (1968, 1971, 1980, 1992)
Ecuador	10th	Fourth place (1984, 1992)
Paraguay	9th	Winners (1992)
Peru	12th	Runners-up (1960)
Uruguay	11th	Runners-up (1976)
Venezuela (hosts)	10th	Fourth place (1980, 1996)

=== Squads ===
Players born on or after 1 January 2001 are eligible to compete in the tournament. Each team could register a maximum of 23 and a minimum of 19 players, including at least 3 goalkeepers (Regulations Articles 45 and 48).

== Venues ==
On 11 July 2022, CONMEBOL President Alejandro Domínguez announced that Venezuela would host the next CONMEBOL Pre-Olympic Tournament. Venezuela is hosting the tournament for the first time, becoming the ninth CONMEBOL nation to do so. On 14 October 2023, CONMEBOL announced Caracas, Valencia and Barquisimeto as the host cities. On 28 January 2024, Barquisimeto was withdrawn as host city because the playing field of the Estadio Metropolitano was not fit to host the games it had scheduled.

Estadio Brígido Iriarte in Caracas and Estadio Misael Delgado in Valencia will host the preliminary stage matches. The final stage matches, originally scheduled to be held at Estadio Metropolitano in Barquisimeto, were moved to Estadio Brígido Iriarte in Caracas.

Caracas	Valencia	Location of the host cities of the 2024 CONMEBOL Pre-Olympic Tournament.
Estadio Brígido Iriarte	Estadio Misael Delgado	Location of the host cities of the 2024 CONMEBOL Pre-Olympic Tournament.
Capacity: 10,000	Capacity: 10,400	Location of the host cities of the 2024 CONMEBOL Pre-Olympic Tournament.

== Draw ==
The draw was held on 20 October 2023 at the CONMEBOL headquarters in Luque, Paraguay. Hosts Venezuela and defending champions Argentina were seeded into Group A and Group B, respectively, and assigned to position 1 in their group. The remaining eight teams were placed into four "pairing pots" based on their final ranking in the 2020 CONMEBOL Pre-Olympic Tournament (shown in brackets).

Seeded	Pot 1	Pot 2	Pot 3	Pot 4
Venezuela (Hosts, assigned to A1); Argentina (Defending champions, assigned to B1)	Brazil (2); Uruguay (3)	Colombia (4); Chile (5)	Bolivia (6); Paraguay (7)	Peru (9); Ecuador (10)

From each pot, the first team drawn was placed into Group A and the second team drawn was placed into Group B. In both groups, teams from pot 1 were allocated in position 2, teams from pot 2 in position 3, teams from pot 3 in position 4 and teams from pot 4 in position 5.

The draw resulted in the following groups:

Group A
Pos	Team
A1	Venezuela
A2	Brazil
A3	Colombia
A4	Bolivia
A5	Ecuador

Group B
Pos	Team
B1	Argentina
B2	Uruguay
B3	Chile
B4	Paraguay
B5	Peru

== Match officials ==
On 14 December 2023, the CONMEBOL Referee Commission announced 11 referees and 22 assistant referees appointed for the tournament.

- (Argentina) Yael Falcón Pérez
  - Assistants: Cristian Navarro and Facundo Rodríguez
- (Bolivia) Gery Vargas
  - Assistants: José Antelo, Edwar Saavedra and Carlos Tapia
- (Brazil) Flávio de Souza
  - Assistants: Nailton Sousa and Luanderson De Lima
- (Chile) Cristian Garay and Felipe González
  - Assistants: Miguel Rocha and Juan Serrano
- (Colombia) Jhon Ospina
  - Assistants: John León and Jhon Gallego
- (Ecuador) Augusto Aragón
  - Assistants: Ricardo Baren and Andrés Tola
- (Paraguay) Derlis López
  - Assistants: Roberto Cañete and José Cuevas
- (Peru) Roberto Pérez
  - Assistants: Enrique Pinto and Stephen Atoche
- (Uruguay) Gustavo Tejera
  - Assistants: Carlos Barreiro, Andrés Nievas and Pablo Llarena
- (Venezuela) Alexis Herrera
  - Assistants: Lubin Torrealba and Alberto Ponte

== Preliminary stage ==
The top two teams of each group advance to the final stage.

All match times are in VET (UTC−4), as listed by CONMEBOL.

Tiebreakers

In the preliminary stage, the teams were ranked according to points earned (three points for a win, one for a draw, none for a defeat). If tied on points, tiebreakers would be applied in the following order (Regulations Article 20):

1. Head-to-head result between tied teams;
  - Points in head-to-head matches among the tied teams;
  - Goal difference in head-to-head matches among the tied teams;
  - Goals scored in head-to-head matches among the tied teams;
2. Goal difference in all group matches;
3. Goals scored in all group matches;
4. Fewer red cards;
5. Fewer yellow cards;
6. Drawing of lots.

=== Group A ===
Pos	Team	Pld	W	D	L	GF	GA	GD	Pts	Qualification
1	Brazil	4	3	0	1	6	4	+2	9	Final stage
2	Venezuela (H)	4	2	2	0	8	5	+3	8	Final stage
3	Ecuador	4	2	1	1	7	3	+4	7	
4	Bolivia	4	1	1	2	5	6	−1	4	
5	Colombia	4	0	0	4	0	8	−8	0	

Source: CONMEBOL
Rules for classification: Group stage tiebreakers
(H) Hosts
20 January 2024
16:00

Ecuador	3–0	Colombia
Medina 71', 88'; Zambrano 86'	Report

Estadio Brígido Iriarte, Caracas
Referee: Yael Falcón Pérez (Argentina)
20 January 2024
19:00

Venezuela	3–3	Bolivia
Lacava 37'; Bolívar 42'; Rivas 63'	Report	Briceño 31'; Chávez 83'; Villamíl 90+6'

Estadio Brígido Iriarte, Caracas
Referee: Roberto Pérez (Peru)

23 January 2024
16:00

Bolivia	0–1	Brazil
	Report	Endrick 4'

Estadio Brígido Iriarte, Caracas
Referee: Derlis López (Paraguay)
23 January 2024
19:00

Ecuador	1–1	Venezuela
Medina 70'	Report	Kelsy 20'

Estadio Brígido Iriarte, Caracas
Referee: Gustavo Tejera (Uruguay)

26 January 2024
16:00

Bolivia	0–2	Ecuador
	Report	J. Mercado 22'; Obando 90+3'

Estadio Brígido Iriarte, Caracas
Referee: Yael Falcón Pérez (Argentina)
26 January 2024
19:00

Brazil	2–0	Colombia
Endrick 25'; John Kennedy 83'	Report

Estadio Brígido Iriarte, Caracas
Referee: Cristian Garay (Chile)

29 January 2024
16:00

Brazil	2–1	Ecuador
Marlon Gomes 65'; Gabriel Pirani 75'	Report	P. Mercado 59'

Estadio Brígido Iriarte, Caracas
Referee: Gustavo Tejera (Uruguay)
29 January 2024
19:00

Colombia	0–1	Venezuela
	Report	Bolívar 34'

Estadio Brígido Iriarte, Caracas
Referee: Roberto Pérez (Peru)

1 February 2024
19:00

Venezuela	3–1	Brazil
Segovia 10', 31'; Rikelme 55' (o.g.)	Report	Alexsander 90'

Estadio Brígido Iriarte, Caracas
Referee: Cristian Garay (Chile)
1 February 2024
19:00

Colombia	0–2	Bolivia
	Report	Briceño 9', 29'

Estadio Misael Delgado, Valencia
Referee: Derlis López (Paraguay)

=== Group B ===
Pos	Team	Pld	W	D	L	GF	GA	GD	Pts	Qualification
1	Argentina	4	2	2	0	11	4	+7	8	Final stage
2	Paraguay	4	2	1	1	7	6	+1	7	Final stage
3	Chile	4	2	0	2	3	7	−4	6	
4	Uruguay	4	1	1	2	9	8	+1	4	
5	Peru	4	1	0	3	1	6	−5	3	

Source: CONMEBOL
Rules for classification: Group stage tiebreakers
21 January 2024
16:00

Peru	1–0	Chile
Flores 67'	Report

Estadio Misael Delgado, Valencia
Referee: Jhon Ospina (Colombia)
21 January 2024
19:00

Argentina	1–1	Paraguay
Gondou 90'	Report	D. Gómez 67' (pen.)

Estadio Misael Delgado, Valencia
Referee: Flávio de Souza (Brazil)

24 January 2024
16:00

Paraguay	4–3	Uruguay
De Jesús 30'; D. Gómez 44', 72'; Fernández 54'	Report	L. Rodríguez 8', 11', 34'

Estadio Misael Delgado, Valencia
Referee: Alexis Herrera (Venezuela)
24 January 2024
19:00

Peru	0–2	Argentina
	Report	Almada 53' (pen.); Gondou 87'

Estadio Misael Delgado, Valencia
Referee: Gery Vargas (Bolivia)

27 January 2024
16:00

Paraguay	1–0	Peru
Fernández 18'	Report

Estadio Misael Delgado, Valencia
Referee: Augusto Aragón (Ecuador)
27 January 2024
19:00

Uruguay	0–1	Chile
	Report	Montes 64'

Estadio Misael Delgado, Valencia
Referee: Flávio de Souza (Brazil)

30 January 2024
16:00

Uruguay	3–0	Peru
L. Rodríguez 44' (pen.); Homenchenko 45+1'; Sánchez 48'	Report

Estadio Misael Delgado, Valencia
Referee: Gery Vargas (Bolivia)
30 January 2024
19:00

Chile	0–5	Argentina
	Report	Almada 45', 57' (pen.); Castro 61'; Quirós 79'; Gondou 90+1'

Estadio Misael Delgado, Valencia
Referee: Alexis Herrera (Venezuela)

2 February 2024
19:00

Argentina	3–3	Uruguay
Rodríguez 7'; Quirós 11'; González 25'	Report	L. Rodríguez 19'; Araújo 41'; Abaldo 61'

Estadio Misael Delgado, Valencia
Referee: Jhon Ospina (Colombia)
2 February 2024
19:00

Chile	2–1	Paraguay
Tapia 31'; Assadi 70'	Report	Leguizamón 33'

Estadio Brígido Iriarte, Caracas
Referee: Augusto Aragón (Ecuador)

== Final stage ==
The ranking of teams in the final stage is determined using the same criteria as the first stage, taking into account only matches in the final stage, with the exception of red and yellow card counts which carry over from the first stage (Regulations Article 21).

All match times are in VET (UTC−4), as listed by CONMEBOL.

Pos	Team	Pld	W	D	L	GF	GA	GD	Pts	Qualification
1	Paraguay (C)	3	2	1	0	6	3	+3	7	2024 Summer Olympics
2	Argentina	3	1	2	0	6	5	+1	5	2024 Summer Olympics
3	Brazil	3	1	0	2	2	3	−1	3	
4	Venezuela (H)	3	0	1	2	3	6	−3	1	

Source: CONMEBOL
Rules for classification: Group stage tiebreakers
(C) Champions; (H) Hosts
5 February 2024
16:00

Brazil	0–1	Paraguay
	Report	Peralta 45+2'

Estadio Brígido Iriarte, Caracas
Referee: Roberto Pérez (Peru)
5 February 2024
19:00

Argentina	2–2	Venezuela
Vivas 39' (o.g.); Almada 61'	Report	Brey 16' (o.g.); Kelsy 90+10' (pen.)

Estadio Brígido Iriarte, Caracas
Referee: Augusto Aragón (Ecuador)

8 February 2024
16:00

Argentina	3–3	Paraguay
Solari 3'; Almada 84' (pen.); Redondo 90+7'	Report	D. Gómez 42'; Núñez 70'; E. González 90'

Estadio Brígido Iriarte, Caracas
Referee: Gustavo Tejera (Uruguay)
8 February 2024
19:00

Venezuela	1–2	Brazil
Bolívar 67'	Report	Maurício 57'; Guilherme Biro 88'

Estadio Brígido Iriarte, Caracas
Referee: Gery Vargas (Bolivia)

11 February 2024
16:30

Brazil	0–1	Argentina
	Report	Gondou 78'

Estadio Brígido Iriarte, Caracas
Referee: Christian Garay (Chile)
11 February 2024
19:30

Paraguay	2–0	Venezuela
D. Gómez 48' (pen.); Pérez 75'	Report

Estadio Brígido Iriarte, Caracas
Referee: Jhon Ospina (Colombia)

== Goalscorers ==
There were 74 goals scored in 26 matches, for an average of 2.85 goals per match.

5 goals

- (Argentina) Thiago Almada
- (Paraguay) Diego Gómez
- (Uruguay) Luciano Rodríguez

4 goals

- (Argentina) Luciano Gondou

3 goals

- (Bolivia) José Miguel Briceño
- (Ecuador) Yaimar Medina
- (Venezuela) Jovanny Bolívar

2 goals

- (Argentina) Aaron Quirós
- (Brazil) Endrick
- (Paraguay) Marcelo Fernández
- (Venezuela) Kevin Kelsy
- (Venezuela) Telasco Segovia

1 goal

- (Argentina) Santiago Castro
- (Argentina) Francisco González
- (Argentina) Federico Redondo
- (Argentina) Baltasar Rodríguez
- (Argentina) Pablo Solari
- (Bolivia) Lucas Chávez
- (Bolivia) Gabriel Villamíl
- (Brazil) Alexsander
- (Brazil) Marlon Gomes
- (Brazil) Guilherme Biro
- (Brazil) John Kennedy
- (Brazil) Maurício
- (Brazil) Gabriel Pirani
- (Chile) Lucas Assadi
- (Chile) Clemente Montes
- (Chile) Gonzalo Tapia
- (Ecuador) John Mercado
- (Ecuador) Patrik Mercado
- (Ecuador) Allen Obando
- (Ecuador) Cristhoper Zambrano
- (Paraguay) Ronaldo De Jesús
- (Paraguay) Enso González
- (Paraguay) Iván Leguizamón
- (Paraguay) Alan Núñez
- (Paraguay) Fabrizio Peralta
- (Paraguay) Marcelo Pérez
- (Peru) Franchesco Flores
- (Uruguay) Matías Abaldo
- (Uruguay) César Araújo
- (Uruguay) Santiago Homenchenko
- (Uruguay) Renzo Sánchez
- (Venezuela) Matías Lacava
- (Venezuela) Renné Rivas

1 own goal

- (Argentina) Leandro Brey (against Venezuela)
- (Brazil) Rikelme (against Venezuela)
- (Venezuela) Carlos Vivas (against Argentina)

== Qualified teams for the 2024 Summer Olympics ==
The following two teams from CONMEBOL qualified for the 2024 Summer Olympic men's football tournament in France.

Team	Qualified on	Previous appearances in Summer Olympics^{1}
Argentina	11 February 2024	9 (1928, 1960, 1964, 1988, 1996, **2004**, **2008**, 2016, 2020)
Paraguay	11 February 2024	2 (1992, 2004)

^{1} Bold indicates champions for that year. Italic indicates hosts for that year.
