= 2020 CONMEBOL Pre-Olympic Tournament =

13th edition of the CONMEBOL Pre-Olympic Tournament

CONMEBOL Preolímpico Colombia 2020
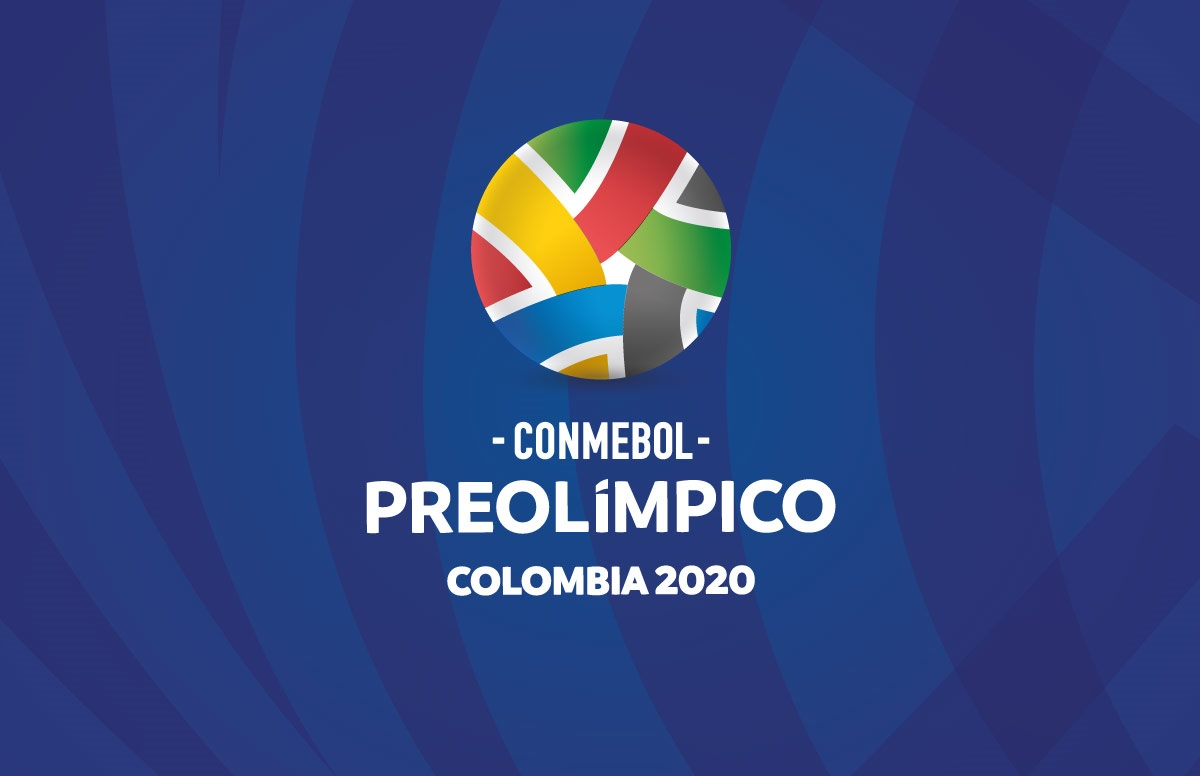

Tournament details
- Host country: Colombia
- Dates: 18 January – 9 February 2020
- Teams: 10 (from 1 confederation)
- Venues: 3 (in 3 host cities)

Final positions
- Champions: Argentina (5th title)
- Runners-up: Brazil
- Third place: Uruguay
- Fourth place: Colombia

Tournament statistics
- Matches played: 26
- Goals scored: 75 (2.88 per match)
- Top scorer(s): (Brazil) Matheus Cunha (5 goals)
- Best player: (Brazil) Bruno Guimarães

The 2020 CONMEBOL Pre-Olympic Tournament was the 13th edition of the CONMEBOL Pre-Olympic Tournament, the quadrennial, international, age-restricted football tournament organised by the Confederación Sudamericana de Fútbol (CONMEBOL) to determine which men's under-23 national teams from the South American region qualify for the Olympic football tournament.

In August 2018, CONMEBOL announced the return of the South American Pre-Olympic Tournament in 2020 with Colombia as the host country, after a 16-year absence. The last edition of this competition had been held in Chile in 2004. From 2008 through the 2016 Summer Olympics, the two teams from South America were determined by the South American Youth Football Championship, always held in the previous year. The tournament was held from 18 January through 9 February 2020.

The top two teams qualified for the 2020 Summer Olympics men's football tournament in Japan as the CONMEBOL representatives. Argentina successfully defended their title won 16 years ago, and qualified for the Olympics together with runners-up Brazil, the defending Olympic champions.

== Teams ==
All ten CONMEBOL member national teams entered the tournament.

Team	Appearance	Previous best top-4 performance
Argentina (holders)	11th	Winners (1960, 1964, 1980, 2004)
Bolivia	8th	Third place (1987)
Brazil	13th	Winners (1968, 1971, 1976, 1984, 1987, 1996, 2000)
Chile	12th	Runners-up (1984, 2000)
Colombia (hosts)	13th	Runners-up (1968, 1971, 1980, 1992)
Ecuador	10th	Fourth place (1984, 1992)
Paraguay	9th	Winners (1992)
Peru	12th	Runners-up (1960)
Uruguay	11th	Runners-up (1976)
Venezuela	10th	Fourth place (1980, 1996)

== Venues ==
Colombia was announced as host of the tournament at the CONMEBOL Council meeting held on 14 August 2018 in Luque, Paraguay. On 28 August 2019, Pereira, Armenia, and Bucaramanga were announced as the host cities.

Pereira	Armenia	Bucaramanga	Location of the host cities of the 2020 CONMEBOL Pre-Olympic Tournament.
Estadio Hernán Ramírez Villegas	Estadio Centenario	Estadio Alfonso López	Location of the host cities of the 2020 CONMEBOL Pre-Olympic Tournament.
Capacity: 30,300	Capacity: 20,716	Capacity: 25,000	Location of the host cities of the 2020 CONMEBOL Pre-Olympic Tournament.

== Squads ==
Players born on or after 1 January 1997 were eligible to compete in the tournament.

== Draw ==
The draw of the tournament was held on 5 November 2019, 19:00 COT (UTC−5), at the Auditorium of the Colombian Football Federation in Bogotá, Colombia. The ten teams were drawn into two groups of five. The hosts Colombia and Brazil as the current Olympic champions and best CONMEBOL team in the FIFA World Rankings as of October 2019 were seeded into Group A and Group B, respectively, and assigned to position 1 in their group, while the remaining eight teams were placed into four "pairing pots" based on their FIFA World Rankings as of October 2019 (shown in brackets). The positions of these eight teams within their groups were also defined by draw.

Seeded	Pot 1	Pot 2	Pot 3	Pot 4
Colombia (10) (Hosts, assigned to A1); Brazil (3) (Olympic champions holders, assigned to B1)	Uruguay (5); Argentina (9)	Chile (17); Peru (19)	Venezuela (26); Paraguay (41)	Ecuador (63); Bolivia (75)

The draw was led by Hugo Figueredo, CONMEBOL's Director of Competitions, with the collaboration of Daniela Montoya, a member of the Colombia women's national football team, and former Colombian footballer Iván Valenciano.

== Match officials ==
On 4 December 2019, CONMEBOL announced that the CONMEBOL Referee Commission had appointed 12 referees and 20 assistant referees for the tournament. Referees Guillermo Guerrero from Ecuador and Alexis Herrera from Venezuela as well as the assistant referee Byron Romero from Ecuador, who were not included in the initial list of officials, were summoned to officiate in the two matches of the final stage's last matchday.

- (Argentina) Facundo Tello and Darío Herrera
  - Assistants: Julio Fernández and Cristian Navarro
- (Bolivia) Ivo Méndez
  - Assistants: Juan Pablo Montaño and Ariel Guizada
- (Brazil) Rodolpho Toski
  - Assistants: Kleber Lúcio Gil and Fabrício Vilarinho
- (Chile) Piero Maza
  - Assistants: Alejandro Molina and Claudio Urrutia
- (Colombia) Nicolás Gallo
  - Assistants: Dionisio Ruiz and Sebastián Vela

- (Ecuador) Franklin Congo and Guillermo Guerrero
  - Assistants: Juan Carlos Macías, Ricardo Baren and Byron Romero
- (Paraguay) Eber Aquino
  - Assistants: Juan Zorrilla and Darío Gaona
- (Peru) Kevin Ortega
  - Assistants: Jonny Bossio and Jesús Sánchez
- (Uruguay) Esteban Ostojich and Andrés Matonte
  - Assistants: Carlos Barreiro and Horacio Ferreiro
- (Venezuela) Ángel Arteaga and Alexis Herrera
  - Assistants: Lubin Torrealba and Tulio Moreno

== First stage ==
The top two teams of each group advanced to the final stage.

Tiebreakers

The ranking of teams in the first stage was determined as follows (Regulations Article 8):

1. Points obtained in all group matches (three points for a win, one for a draw, none for a defeat);
2. Goal difference in all group matches;
3. Number of goals scored in all group matches;
4. Points obtained in the matches played between the teams in question;
5. Goal difference in the matches played between the teams in question;
6. Number of goals scored in the matches played between the teams in question;
7. Fair play points in all group matches (only one deduction could be applied to a player in a single match):
  - Yellow card: −1 points;
  - Indirect red card (second yellow card): −3 points;
  - Direct red card: −4 points;
  - Yellow card and direct red card: −5 points;
8. Drawing of lots.

All times are local, COT (UTC−5).

=== Group A ===
Pos	Team	Pld	W	D	L	GF	GA	GD	Pts	Qualification
1	Argentina	4	4	0	0	9	2	+7	12	Final stage
2	Colombia (H)	4	2	1	1	7	3	+4	7	Final stage
3	Chile	4	2	1	1	4	2	+2	7	
4	Venezuela	4	1	0	3	3	7	−4	3	
5	Ecuador	4	0	0	4	0	9	−9	0	

Source: CONMEBOL
Rules for classification: Group stage tiebreakers
(H) Hosts
18 January 2020
18:00

Ecuador	0–3	Chile
	Report	Porozo 59' (o.g.); Moya 76'; Morales 90+4'

Estadio Hernán Ramírez Villegas, Pereira
Attendance: 21,660
Referee: Ivo Méndez (Bolivia)
18 January 2020
20:30

Colombia	1–2	Argentina
Carrascal 7'	Report	Mac Allister 11'; Gaich 51'

Estadio Hernán Ramírez Villegas, Pereira
Attendance: 30,200
Referee: Esteban Ostojich (Uruguay)

21 January 2020
18:00

Chile	1–0	Venezuela
Araos 82'	Report

Estadio Centenario, Armenia
Attendance: 10,000
Referee: Rodolpho Toski (Brazil)
21 January 2020
20:30

Colombia	4–0	Ecuador
Benedetti 15'; Carrascal 26'; Cetré 32'; Carbonero 87'	Report

Estadio Centenario, Armenia
Attendance: 21,990
Referee: Eber Aquino (Paraguay)

24 January 2020
18:00

Venezuela	1–0	Ecuador
Soteldo 25'	Report

Estadio Hernán Ramírez Villegas, Pereira
Attendance: 7,282
Referee: Andrés Matonte (Uruguay)
24 January 2020
20:30

Chile	0–2	Argentina
	Report	Capaldo 8'; Pérez 57'

Estadio Hernán Ramírez Villegas, Pereira
Attendance: 9,000
Referee: Kevin Ortega (Peru)

27 January 2020
18:00

Argentina	1–0	Ecuador
Mac Allister 12'	Report

Estadio Hernán Ramírez Villegas, Pereira
Attendance: 18,054
Referee: Rodolpho Toski (Brazil)
27 January 2020
20:30

Colombia	2–1	Venezuela
Carrascal 45+2'; Atuesta 71'	Report	Hurtado 45+1'

Estadio Hernán Ramírez Villegas, Pereira
Attendance: 30,162
Referee: Kevin Ortega (Peru)

30 January 2020
18:00

Venezuela	1–4	Argentina
Soteldo 27' (pen.)	Report	Colombo 49'; Zaracho 75'; Álvarez 86'; Bustos 90+1'

Estadio Hernán Ramírez Villegas, Pereira
Attendance: 20,418
Referee: Ivo Méndez (Bolivia)
30 January 2020
20:30

Colombia	0–0	Chile
	Report

Estadio Hernán Ramírez Villegas, Pereira
Attendance: 30,100
Referee: Eber Aquino (Paraguay)

=== Group B ===
Pos	Team	Pld	W	D	L	GF	GA	GD	Pts	Qualification
1	Brazil	4	4	0	0	11	5	+6	12	Final stage
2	Uruguay	4	2	0	2	5	6	−1	6	Final stage
3	Bolivia	4	2	0	2	8	10	−2	6	
4	Paraguay	4	1	0	3	5	6	−1	3	
5	Peru	4	1	0	3	4	6	−2	3	

Source: CONMEBOL
Rules for classification: Group stage tiebreakers
19 January 2020
18:00

Uruguay	1–0	Paraguay
Rossi 48'	Report

Estadio Centenario, Armenia
Attendance: 2,992
Referee: Piero Maza (Chile)
19 January 2020
20:30

Brazil	1–0	Peru
Paulinho 43'	Report

Estadio Centenario, Armenia
Attendance: 3,058
Referee: Ángel Arteaga (Venezuela)

22 January 2020
18:00

Paraguay	2–0	Bolivia
Bareiro 45', 88'	Report

Estadio Hernán Ramírez Villegas, Pereira
Attendance: 2,052
Referee: Nicolás Gallo
22 January 2020
20:30

Brazil	3–1	Uruguay
Pedrinho 14'; Cunha 31' (pen.); Pepê 77'	Report	Bueno 80'

Estadio Hernán Ramírez Villegas, Pereira
Attendance: 6,100
Referee: Facundo Tello (Argentina)

25 January 2020
18:00

Bolivia	3–2	Uruguay
Villarroel 25' (pen.); Ábrego 59'; Saldías 90+4'	Report	J. Rodríguez 78'; Viñas 80'

Estadio Centenario, Armenia
Attendance: 4,095
Referee: Franklin Congo (Ecuador)
25 January 2020
20:30

Paraguay	2–3	Peru
Salcedo 15'; Díaz 16'	Report	Gonzales 53'; Carranza 71'; S. Arzamendia 74' (o.g.)

Estadio Centenario, Armenia
Attendance: 6,395
Referee: Darío Herrera (Argentina)

28 January 2020
18:00

Peru	0–1	Uruguay
	Report	Ginella 11'

Estadio Centenario, Armenia
Attendance: 2,908
Referee: Ángel Arteaga (Venezuela)
28 January 2020
20:30

Brazil	5–3	Bolivia
Antony 3'; Cunha 16'; Guga 39'; Reinier 61'; Pepê 90+5'	Report	Ábrego 20', 71'; Reyes 79'

Estadio Centenario, Armenia
Attendance: 5,542
Referee: Facundo Tello (Argentina)

31 January 2020
18:00

Bolivia	2–1	Peru
Villarroel 69'; Saldías 75' (pen.)	Report	Luján 90+6'

Estadio Centenario, Armenia
Attendance: 2,891
Referee: Nicolás Gallo
31 January 2020
20:30

Brazil	2–1	Paraguay
Paulinho 75'; Pepê 89'	Report	R. Fernández 61'

Estadio Centenario, Armenia
Attendance: 7,411
Referee: Piero Maza (Chile)

== Final stage ==
The ranking of teams in the final stage was determined using the same criteria as the first stage, taking into account only matches in the final stage (Regulations Article 8).

Pos	Team	Pld	W	D	L	GF	GA	GD	Pts	Qualification
1	Argentina (C)	3	2	0	1	5	6	−1	6	2020 Summer Olympics
2	Brazil	3	1	2	0	5	2	+3	5	2020 Summer Olympics
3	Uruguay	3	1	1	1	6	5	+1	4	
4	Colombia (H)	3	0	1	2	3	6	−3	1	

Source: CONMEBOL
Rules for classification: Group stage tiebreakers
(C) Champions; (H) Hosts
3 February 2020
18:00

Argentina	3–2	Uruguay
Mac Allister 18', 55'; Vera 39'	Report	Ramírez 67'; Arezo 90+3'

Estadio Alfonso López, Bucaramanga
Attendance: 16,428
Referee: Kevin Ortega (Peru)
3 February 2020
20:30

Brazil	1–1	Colombia
Cunha 71'	Report	Cetré 27'

Estadio Alfonso López, Bucaramanga
Attendance: 24,631
Referee: Ángel Arteaga (Venezuela)

6 February 2020
18:00

Brazil	1–1	Uruguay
De Arruabarrena 40' (o.g.)	Report	Ugarte 35'

Estadio Alfonso López, Bucaramanga
Attendance: 12,057
Referee: Eber Aquino (Paraguay)
6 February 2020
20:30

Argentina	2–1	Colombia
Urzi 50'; Pérez 53'	Report	Cetré 67' (pen.)

Estadio Alfonso López, Bucaramanga
Attendance: 24,952
Referee: Piero Maza (Chile)

9 February 2020
18:00

Colombia	1–3	Uruguay
Cetré 78'	Report	Ramírez 28'; Sanabria 53'; J. Rodríguez 61'

Estadio Alfonso López, Bucaramanga
Attendance: 24,839
Referee: Guillermo Guerrero (Ecuador)
9 February 2020
20:30

Argentina	0–3	Brazil
	Report	Paulinho 13'; Cunha 30', 55'

Estadio Alfonso López, Bucaramanga
Attendance: 15,683
Referee: Alexis Herrera (Venezuela)

== Goalscorers ==
There were 75 goals scored in 26 matches, for an average of 2.88 goals per match.

5 goals

- (Brazil) Matheus Cunha

4 goals

- (Argentina) Alexis Mac Allister
- (Colombia) Edwuin Cetré

3 goals

- (Bolivia) Víctor Ábrego
- (Brazil) Paulinho
- (Brazil) Pepê
- (Colombia) Jorge Carrascal

2 goals

- (Argentina) Nehuén Pérez
- (Bolivia) Fernando Saldías
- (Bolivia) Moisés Villarroel
- (Paraguay) Sergio Bareiro
- (Uruguay) Ignacio Ramírez
- (Uruguay) José Luis Rodríguez
- (Venezuela) Yeferson Soteldo

1 goal

- (Argentina) Julián Álvarez
- (Argentina) Nahuel Bustos
- (Argentina) Nicolás Capaldo
- (Argentina) Nazareno Colombo
- (Argentina) Adolfo Gaich
- (Argentina) Agustín Urzi
- (Argentina) Fausto Vera
- (Argentina) Matías Zaracho
- (Bolivia) Sebastián Reyes
- (Brazil) Antony
- (Brazil) Guga
- (Brazil) Pedrinho
- (Brazil) Reinier
- (Chile) Ángelo Araos
- (Chile) Iván Morales
- (Chile) Camilo Moya
- (Colombia) Eduard Atuesta
- (Colombia) Nicolás Benedetti
- (Colombia) Johan Carbonero
- (Paraguay) Sergio Díaz
- (Paraguay) Roberto Fernández
- (Paraguay) Saúl Salcedo
- (Peru) Luis Carranza
- (Peru) Sebastián Gonzales
- (Peru) José Luján
- (Uruguay) Matías Arezo
- (Uruguay) Santiago Bueno
- (Uruguay) Francisco Ginella
- (Uruguay) Diego Rossi
- (Uruguay) Juan Manuel Sanabria
- (Uruguay) Manuel Ugarte
- (Uruguay) Federico Viñas
- (Venezuela) Jan Carlos Hurtado

1 own goal

- (Ecuador) Jackson Porozo (against Chile)
- (Paraguay) Santiago Arzamendia (against Peru)
- (Uruguay) Ignacio De Arruabarrena (against Brazil)

== Qualified teams for Summer Olympics ==
The following two teams from CONMEBOL qualified for the 2020 Summer Olympic men's football tournament.

Team	Qualified on	Previous appearances in Summer Olympics^{1}
Argentina	6 February 2020	8 (1928, 1960, 1964, 1988, 1996, **2004**, **2008**, 2016)
Brazil	9 February 2020	13 (1952, 1960, 1964, 1968, 1972, 1976, 1984, 1988, 1996, 2000, 2008, 2012, **2016**)

^{1} Bold indicates champions for that year. Italic indicates hosts for that year.
