= 2019 Tenerife Tournament =

Portuguese: 2019 Torneio de Tenerife

Tournament details
- Host country: Spain
- City: Las Palmas
- Dates: 14–17 November

Tournament statistics
- Matches played: 4

The 2019 Tenerife Tournament (also known as the United International Football Festival) was a scheduled association football tournament that took place in November 2019. Despite the name including Tenerife, this competition took place on the neighbouring island of Gran Canaria.

The competition was used to prepare South American teams for the 2020 CONMEBOL Pre-Olympic Tournament.

== Venues ==
Las Palmas	Estadio Gran Canaria is located in Canary Islands
Estadio Gran Canaria	Estadio Gran Canaria is located in Canary Islands
28.1°N 15.45°W	Estadio Gran Canaria is located in Canary Islands
Capacity: 32,400	Estadio Gran Canaria is located in Canary Islands

== Matches ==
=== Semi-finals ===
14 November 2019
19:30

Brazil	v	United States

Estadio Gran Canaria, Las Palmas

14 November 2019

Argentina	v	Chile

Estadio Gran Canaria, Las Palmas

=== Third-place playoff ===
17 November 2019

v

Estadio Gran Canaria, Las Palmas

=== Final ===
17 November 2019

v

Estadio Gran Canaria, Las Palmas
