= Luis Carranza (footballer) =

Peruvian footballer (born 1998)

Personal information
- Full name: Luis Enrique Carranza Vargas
- Date of birth: 18 August 1998 (age 28)
- Place of birth: Lima, Peru
- Height: 1.67 m (5 ft 6 in)
- Position: Winger

Team information
- Current team: Deportivo Llacuabamba
- Number: 15

Youth career
- Sporting Cristal

Senior career*
Years	Team	Apps	(Gls)
2017–2020	Sporting Cristal	0	(0)
2017	→ Ayacucho (loan)	28	(1)
2018	→ San Martín (loan)	6	(0)
2019–2020	→ Ayacucho (loan)	36	(2)
2021	Ayacucho	16	(1)
2022	Carlos A. Mannucci	7	(0)
2023	Sport Boys	32	(1)
2024	San Marcos	5	(0)
2025–	Deportivo Llacuabamba	1	(0)

International career
2020	Peru U23	2	(0)
- * Club domestic league appearances and goals as of 18:49, 18 May 2025 (UTC)

Luis Enrique Carranza Vargas (born 18 August 1998) is a Peruvian footballer who plays as a winger for Deportivo Llacuabamba.

== Club career ==
=== Sporting Cristal ===
Carranza is a product of Sporting Cristal and was promoted to the club's reserve team for the 2016 season.

After a good season with the reserves, Carranza was loaned out to Peruvian Primera División club Ayacucho FC to gain some experience. Carranza already knew Ayacuchos head coach, Francisco Melgar, who formerly worked as a youth coach at Sporting Cristal. He made his debut on 4 February 2017, where he played the first half in Ayacucho's 1-0 loss to Sport Rosario. Carranza made a total of 28 league appearances for Ayacucho in that season.

After the end of the loan deal, he was sent out on loan yet again, this time to Universidad San Martín. However, he did only play six games and for that reason, he returned to Ayacucho FC for the 2019 season, again on a loan deal. The deal was also applicable for the 2020 season.

=== Later clubs ===
After three previous loan spells at the club in 2017, 2019 and 2020, Carranza joined the club permanently ahead of the 2021 season.

On 24 November 2021 it was confirmed, that Carranza would join Carlos A. Mannucci for the 2022 season. A year later, ahead of the 2023 season, he moved to fellow league club Sport Boys.

== International career ==
In September 2017, Carranza was called up for the Peruvian U23 national team who was going to play the 2020 CONMEBOL Pre-Olympic Tournament. He participated in two games.
