= Ronaldo Dejesús =

Paraguayan footballer

Personal information
- Full name: Ronaldo Nawel Dejesús López
- Date of birth: 21 April 2001 (age 25)
- Place of birth: San Patricio, Paraguay
- Height: 1.92 m (6 ft 4 in)
- Position: Defender

Team information
- Current team: Lanús
- Number: 35

Senior career*
Years	Team	Apps	(Gls)
2023–2024	Cerro Porteño	34	(4)
2025–	Lanús	25	(0)

International career
2023–2024	Paraguay Olympic	18	(1)
- * Club domestic league appearances and goals as of 23:15, 1 June 2026 (UTC)

Ronaldo Nawel Dejesús López (born 21 April 2001) is a Paraguayan footballer who plays as a defender for Argentine Primera División club Lanús.

== Club career ==
=== Youth career ===
Born in San Patricio in the Misiones Departament, Dejesús was given his first name by his father, who idolised the Brazilian footballer Ronaldo. Dejesús began playing in his local football school before moving on to Libertad San Patricio and then Cerro Porteño at age 16. He had unsuccessfully trialled at Club Libertad and Club Olimpia, and was only permitted to join Cerro by his parents if he continued studying, in his case a course in sports sciences.

=== Cerro Porteño ===
On 6 April 2023, Dejesús made his debut in the Copa Libertadores in a 2–1 home win over Barcelona S.C. of Ecuador, playing the last nine minutes as a substitute for Federico Carrizo. He scored his first goal on 1 October in the Paraguayan Primera División; in a team starting with two academy players at full back due to shortages, he scored the added-time winner in a 3–2 home win over Sportivo Ameliano. Six days later, he scored again in added time, this time the equaliser in a 1–1 draw at Club General Caballero JLM in the 12th minute added on.

=== Lanús ===
On 15 January 2025, Dejesús joined Argentine Primera División side Lanús on a three-year contract. The club had wanted to bring him in on loan, which was rejected, and purchased 50% of his economic rights. He arrived to replace Abel Luciatti, who had moved in the opposite direction to Cerro Porteño. He made his debut eight days later in a 2–0 loss at home to Deportivo Riestra, as a substitute for the final eight minutes.

== International career ==
Dejesús played all seven games for the Paraguay national under-23 football team as they won the 2024 CONMEBOL Pre-Olympic Tournament in Venezuela, and scored in a 4–3 comeback win over Uruguay in the group stage. Upon his return to Asunción, he burst into tears when reunited with his mother, in a photograph that went viral in Paraguay. He was chosen for the 2024 Olympic tournament in France.

In March 2025, Dejesús was one of several new players called up for the senior team by manager Gustavo Alfaro, for 2026 FIFA World Cup qualifiers against Chile and Colombia.

== Career statistics ==
As of 25 July 2025.

Club statistics
Club	Division	League			Cup		Continental		Total	
Club	Division	Season	Apps	Goals	Apps	Goals	Apps	Goals	Apps	Goals
Cerro Porteño	2023	Paraguayan Primera División	10	2	0	0	1 (Note: Appearances in Copa Libertadores)	0	11	2
Cerro Porteño	2024	Paraguayan Primera División	24	2	2	0	2	0	28	2
Cerro Porteño	Total		34	4	2	0	3	0	39	4
Lanús	2025	Argentine Primera División	16	0	3	0	6	0	25	0
Career total			50	4	5	0	9	0	64	4

== Honours ==
Lanús

- Copa Sudamericana: 2025
