= Carlinhos (footballer, born 1974) =

Brazilian footballer

Personal information
- Full name: Carlos Augusto Rodrigues
- Date of birth: 5 December 1974 (age 51)
- Place of birth: Campinas, Brazil
- Height: 1.85 m (6 ft 1 in)
- Position: Centre-back

Youth career
- –1992: Guarani

Senior career*
| Years | Team | Apps | (Gls) |
| 1992–1996 | Guarani | | |
| 1996 | Juventude | | |
| 1997 | Juventus-SP | | |
| 1997–1999 | Waldhof Mannheim | | |
| 1999–2000 | Figueirense | | |
| 2000–2002 | Bahia | | |
| 2002–2003 | Figueirense | | |
| 2004 | Guarani | | |
| 2004–2006 | Santa Cruz | | |
| 2007 | Coruripe | | |
| 2007–2008 | Guaratinguetá | | |
| 2008 | Vila Nova | | |
| 2008 | Marília | | |
| 2009–2011 | Red Bull Brasil | | |

International career
| 1991 | Brazil U17 | | |
| 1995 | Brazil U20 | | |
| 1995–1996 | Brazil U23 | 13 | (1) |
| 1995–1996 | Brazil | 5 | (1) |
- * Club domestic league appearances and goals

Carlos Augusto Rodrigues (born 5 December 1974), better known as Carlinhos, is a Brazilian former professional footballer who played as a centre-back.

== Club career ==
Revealed in the youth categories of Guarani FC, Carlinhos was present in the champion squad of the Copa SP de Jrs. in 1994. He played for the club in 50 matches in total, in 1996 he transferred to Juventude. He had a spell in German football for Waldhof Mannheim, and returned to Brazil, being state champions several times and champion of 2001 Copa do Nordeste with EC Bahia. He ended his career at Red Bull Brasil (currently Red Bull Bragantino II), a club where becomes the second player with most appearances (only behind the goalkeeper Luiz Fernando).

== International career ==
Carlinhos was part of the Brazil under-17 team that won South American Championship in 1991, and competed in the World Championship in the same year. In 1995, he defended the Brazi under-20 team in the Toulon Tournament, becoming champion.

In March 1995, he was called up to the Olympic team (U23), which competed in the 1995 Pan American Games.

On 20 December 1995, he participated in a match for the main Brazil national football team, in a friendly against Colombia. In January 1996, he was called up by coach Mário Zagallo to compete in the 1996 CONCACAF Gold Cup, where he made four more appearances. In February of the same year, Carlinhos was champion of the CONMEBOL Pre-Olympic Tournament.

== Managerial career ==
Carlinhos took over the club as caretaker on two occasions. in 2013 after relegation in the Campeonato Paulista, and in 2014 during the Campeonato Paulista Série A2 dispute.

== Personal life ==
After permanently retiring from football, Carlinhos graduated in civil engineering.

== Career statistics ==
| No. | Cap | Date | Venue | Opponent | Score | Result | Competition | Ref. |
|---|---|---|---|---|---|---|---|---|
| 1 | 1 | 20 December 1995 | Vivaldão, Manaus, Brazil | Colombia | 2–1 | 3–1 | Friendly | |

== Honours ==
Guarani

- Copa São Paulo de Futebol Jr.: 1994

Figueirense

- Campeonato Catarinense: 1999, 2000, 2002

Bahia

- Copa do Nordeste: 2001
- Campeonato Baiano: 2001

Santa Cruz

- Campeonato Pernambucano: 2005

Coruripe

- Campeonato Alagoano: 2007

Red Bull Brasil

- Campeonato Paulista Série A3: 2010
- Campeonato Paulista Série A4: 2009

Brazil U17

- South American U-17 Championship: 1991

Brazil U20

- Toulon Tournament: 1995

Brasil U23

- CONMEBOL Pre-Olympic Tournament: 1996
- Copa Mercosur: 1995
