= Víctor Ábrego =

Bolivian footballer (born 1997)

Personal information
- Full name: Víctor Alonso Ábrego Aguilera
- Date of birth: 11 February 1997 (age 29)
- Place of birth: San José, Bolivia
- Height: 1.76 m (5 ft 9 in)
- Position: Forward

Team information
- Current team: The Strongest

Senior career*
Years	Team	Apps	(Gls)
2018–2019	Destroyers	31	(4)
2020–2024	Bolívar	82	(16)
2023–2024	→ Universitario (V) (loan)	36	(13)
2024–2026	Raja CA	5	(0)
2024–2025	→ Nacional Potosí (loan)	27	(11)
2026–	The Strongest	0	(0)

International career^{‡}
2020–	Bolivia U23	3	(3)
2020–	Bolivia	17	(2)
- * Club domestic league appearances and goals as of 23:18, 15 November 2025 (UTC) ‡ National team caps and goals as of 23:17, 25 March 2025 (UTC)

Víctor Alonso Ábrego Aguilera (born 11 February 1997) is a Bolivian professional footballer who plays as a forward for FBF División Profesional club The Strongest.

== Early life ==
Born in 1997, Ábrego grew up without knowing his father and was raised by his grandfather. At age 15, he received a scholarship to study in Pailón, where he helped his mother's friend with her chicken business, and worked as a waiter.

== Club career ==
In Pailón, Ábrego was nicknamed "Cantinflas" after the Mexican comedian.

In 2020, he was listed in World Soccer magazine's 500 Most Important Players.

== International career ==
Ábrego made his debut for the Bolivia national team in the 2022 FIFA World Cup qualification against Ecuador at home soil.

== Career statistics ==
As of matches played 25 March 2025

Appearances and goals by national team and year
National team	Year	Apps	Goals
Bolivia	2020	2	0
Bolivia	2021	6	1
Bolivia	2022	2	0
Bolivia	2023	5	1
Bolivia	2025	2	0
Total		17	2

List of international goals scored by Victor Ábrego
No.	Date	Venue	Opponent	Score	Result	Competition
1	14 October 2021	Estadio Hernando Siles, La Paz, Bolivia	Paraguay	3–0	4–0	2022 FIFA World Cup qualification
2	8 September 2023	Estádio Mangueirão, Belém, Brazil	Brazil	1–4	1–5	2026 FIFA World Cup qualification
