= Rafael Uzcátegui =

Venezuelan football player (born 2004)

Personal information
- Full name: Rafael Guillermo Uzcátegui Golding
- Date of birth: 4 October 2004 (age 22)
- Place of birth: Puerto Ordaz, Venezuela
- Height: 6 ft 0 in (1.83 m)
- Position: Centre-back

Team information
- Current team: Philadelphia Union II
- Number: 40

Youth career
- –2021: Mineros de Guayana

Senior career*
Years	Team	Apps	(Gls)
2021–2023	Mineros de Guayana	37	(2)
2024–2025	Boyacá Chicó	25	(0)
2025–	Philadelphia Union II	29	(1)

International career^{‡}
2022–2023	Venezuela U20	13	(0)
2024–2024	Venezuela U23	8	(0)
- * Club domestic league appearances and goals as of 18:30, 2 November 2024 (UTC) ‡ National team caps and goals as of 2 November 2025

Rafael Guillermo Uzcátegui Golding (born 4 October 2004) is a Venezuelan professional footballer who plays as a centre-back for Philadelphia Union II of MLS Next Pro.

== Club career ==
Uzcátegui grew up in the Mineros youth academy and made his first-team debut on 14 October 2021 in a 3–0 Liga FUTVE win against Lala. In the second half of the following season, he earned a place in the starting line-up and on 10 September 2022, he scored his first goal in a 3–2 away win against Deportivo Lara.

In January 2024, he was signed on a permanent basis by Boyacá Chicó.

In March 2025, he was signed by the Philadelphia Union II.

== International career ==
In January 2023, he was called up to the Venezuela U20 team to compete in the 2023 South American U-20 Championship in that category; he subsequently also played for the Venezuela U23 team.

== Career statistics ==
=== Club ===
As of match played 8 February 2026

Appearances and goals by club, season and competition
Club	Season	League			National cup (Note: Includes Copa Colombia)		Continental		Other		Total	
Club	Season	League	Apps	Goals	Apps	Goals	Apps	Goals	Apps	Goals	Apps	Goals
Mineros de Guayana	2020	Primera División	1	0	–		–		–		1	0
Mineros de Guayana	2021	Primera División	15	1	–		–		–		15	1
Mineros de Guayana	2022	Primera División	21	1	–		–		–		21	1
Mineros de Guayana	Total		37	2	—		—		—		37	2
Boyacá Chicó	2023	Categoría Primera A	25	0	4	1	–		–		23	3
Boyacá Chicó	Total		62	2	4	1	—		—		66	3
Philadelphia Union II	2025	MLS Next Pro	29	1	–		–		—		14	1
Career total			91	3	—		—		—		95	4
