= Franz Gonzales =

Bolivian footballer (born 2000)

Personal information
- Full name: Franz Simón Gonzales Mejía
- Date of birth: 26 June 2000 (age 26)
- Place of birth: Cochabamba, Bolivia
- Position: Midfielder

Team information
- Current team: Oriente Petrolero
- Number: 15

Youth career
- Aurora

Senior career*
Years	Team	Apps	(Gls)
2018–2019	Sport Boys Warnes	62	(1)
2020	The Strongest	9	(0)
2021	Atlético Palmaflor	2	(0)
2021	Real Santa Cruz	18	(2)
2022	Platense	11	(0)
2022–	Oriente Petrolero	47	(4)

International career^{‡}
2017	Bolivia U17	4	(0)
2019	Bolivia U20	4	(0)
2020–	Bolivia U23	3	(0)
2020–	Bolivia	8	(0)
- * Club domestic league appearances and goals as of 22:30, 26 March 2024 (UTC) ‡ National team caps and goals as of 22:30, 26 March 2024 (UTC)

Franz Simón Gonzales Mejía (born 26 June 2000) is a Bolivian football player who plays as midfielder for Oriente Petrolero.

== International career ==
He made his national team debut on 9 October 2020 in a World Cup qualifier game against Brazil.
