= Frankarlos Benítez =

Venezuelan footballer (born 2004)

Personal information
- Full name: Frankarlos Cruz Benítez Gutierrez
- Date of birth: 3 May 2004 (age 22)
- Place of birth: Cumaná, Venezuela
- Height: 1.84 m (6 ft 0 in)
- Position: Goalkeeper

Team information
- Current team: Caracas
- Number: 12

Youth career
- Nueva Cádiz
- 2018–2023: Caracas

Senior career*
Years	Team	Apps	(Gls)
2023–	Caracas	35	(0)

International career
2019	Venezuela U15	5	(0)
- Venezuela U17
2022–	Venezuela U20	10	(0)
2023	Venezuela U23	6	(0)
- * Club domestic league appearances and goals as of 14:11, 2 December 2021 (UTC)

Frankarlos Cruz Benítez Gutierrez (born 3 May 2004) is a Venezuelan professional footballer who plays as a goalkeeper for Caracas.

== Club career ==
Born in Cumaná, Benítez began playing football at the age of nine, playing as a midfielder at the Escuela Manzanares. He converted to a goalkeeper on the advice of his coach at the Escuela Jesús Yendis. He was then picked up by Nueva Cádiz Fútbol Club to play in a youth tournament in Valencia. In 2018, he joined professional side Caracas at under-14 level.

Having progressed through the academy of Caracas, and establishing himself as one of the best young goalkeepers at the club, he made his professional debut on 20 March 2023, playing the entirety of a 2–0 Venezuelan Primera División win against Metropolitanos.

== International career ==
Benítez has represented Venezuela at various youth levels.

In June 2022 and June 2023, he took part in the Maurice Revello Tournament in France with VENEZUELA team.

== Career statistics ==
=== Club ===
As of matches played 1 April 2023

Appearances and goals by club, season and competition
Club	Season	League			Cup		Continental		Other		Total	
Club	Season	Division	Apps	Goals	Apps	Goals	Apps	Goals	Apps	Goals	Apps	Goals
Caracas	2023	Venezuelan Primera División	1	0	0	0	0	0	0	0	1	0
Career total			1	0	0	0	0	0	0	0	1	0
