= Fernando Saldías =

Bolivian footballer (born 1997)

Personal information
- Full name: Luis Fernando Saldías Muños
- Date of birth: 27 February 1997 (age 29)
- Position: Forward

Team information
- Current team: Rio Branco PR

Senior career*
Years	Team	Apps	(Gls)
2016-2017	The Strongest	4	(1)
2017-2018	Club Blooming	16	(3)
2019	Oriente Petrolero	8	(0)
2020-2021	Club Atlético Palmaflor	32	(5)
2022-2023	Nacional Potosi	8	(0)
2024	Real Santa Cruz	12	(1)
2025-	Rio Branco PR	5	(0)

International career
2020	Bolivia U23	3	(2)
2020	Bolivia	1	(0)
- * Club domestic league appearances and goals as of 00:15 (UTC) 30 December 2025

Luis Fernando Saldías Muños (born 27 February 1997) is a Bolivian footballer who plays in Bolivian Primera División for Rio Branco PR.

== Career ==
He scored the winning goal for Bolivia U23 in the pre-Olympic competition in January 2020, in a 3–2 win over Uruguay U23. He made his full debut for Bolivia on the 10 October 2020, against Brazil.
