= Venezuela national under-23 football team =

Venezuela Olympic
- Nickname: La Vinotinto
- Association: Federación Venezolana de Fútbol (FVF)
- Confederation: CONMEBOL (South America)
- FIFA code: VEN

Pan American Games
- Appearances: 1 (first in 2007)
- Best result: Group stage (2007)

The Venezuela national under-23 football team, also known as the Venezuela Olympic football team, represents Venezuela in international men's football during Olympic Games and Pan American Games. The selection is limited to players under the age of 23, except for three overage players. The team is controlled by the Venezuelan Football Federation.

== Competitive record ==
=== Olympic Games ===
Olympic Games record
Year	Host	Round	Pos.	GP	W	D	L	GS	GA
1992	(Spain) Barcelona	Did not qualify							
1996	(United States) Atlanta	Did not qualify							
2000	(Australia) Sydney	Did not qualify							
2004	(Greece) Athens	Did not qualify							
2008	(China) Beijing	Did not qualify							
2012	(United Kingdom) London	Did not qualify							
2016	(Brazil) Rio de Janeiro	Did not qualify							
2020	(Japan) Tokyo	Did not qualify							
2024	(France) Paris	Did not qualify							
Total		–	0/8	–	–	–	–	–	–

=== CONMEBOL Preolímpico ===
CONMEBOL Preolímpico record
Year	Host	Pos.	GP	W	D	L	GS	GA
1992	Paraguay	Group stage	4	0	1	3	1	9
1996	Argentina	Fourth place	7	2	1	4	7	15
2000	Brazil	Group stage	4	1	1	2	5	9
2004	Chile	Group stage	4	0	1	3	2	11
2020	Colombia	Group stage	4	1	0	3	3	7
2024	Venezuela	Fourth place	7	2	3	2	11	11
Total		Fourth place	30	6	7	17	29	62

=== Pan American Games ===
Pan American Games record
Year	Host	Round	Pos.	GP	W	D	L	GS	GA
Until 1995	See Venezuela national football team								
1999	(Canada) Winnipeg	Did not qualify							
2003	(Dominican Republic) Santo Domingo	Did not qualify							
2007	(Brazil) Rio de Janeiro	Group stage	12th	3	0	0	3	1	6
2011	(Mexico) Guadalajara	Did not qualify							
2015	(Canada) Toronto	Did not qualify							
2019	(Peru) Lima	Did not qualify							
2023	(Chile) Santiago	Did not qualify							
Total		Group stage	1/19	3	0	0	3	1	6

== Players ==
=== Current squad ===
The following 26 players were called up for a training module in Centro Nacional de Alto Rendimiento in Los Robles, Venezuela.

Caps and goals are correct as of 10 December 2023.

No.	Pos.	Player	Date of birth (age)	Caps	Goals	Club
	GK	Frankarlos Benítez	3 May 2004 (age 22)	4	0	(Venezuelan Football Federation) Caracas
	GK	Diego Gil	25 September 2001 (age 25)	4	0	(Venezuelan Football Federation) Academia Puerto Cabello
	GK	Pedro Fulco	26 January 2005 (age 21)	4	0	(Venezuelan Football Federation) Academia Puerto Cabello
	DF	Andrés Ferro	2 August 2001 (age 25)	5	0	(Argentine Football Association) Central Córdoba
	DF	Carlos Vivas	4 April 2002 (age 24)	4	0	(Venezuelan Football Federation) Deportivo Táchira
	DF	Renné Rivas	21 March 2003 (age 23)	2	0	(Venezuelan Football Federation) Caracas
	DF	Rafael Uzcátegui	4 October 2004 (age 22)	2	0	(Venezuelan Football Federation) Mineros de Guayana
	DF	Jesús Quintero	1 February 2001 (age 25)	0	0	(Colombian Football Federation) Deportivo Pasto
	DF	Andry Vera	5 November 2003 (age 23)	0	0	(Venezuelan Football Federation) Mineros de Guayana
	DF	Álex Custodio	31 January 2004 (age 22)	0	0	(Venezuelan Football Federation) Deportivo La Guaira
	DF	Bianneider Tamayo	13 January 2005 (age 21)	4	0	(Venezuelan Football Federation) Caracas
	MF	Yerson Chacón	4 June 2003 (age 23)	9	0	(Venezuelan Football Federation) Deportivo Táchira
	MF	David Martínez	7 February 2006 (age 20)	8	0	(Venezuelan Football Federation) Monagas
	MF	Briant Ortega	28 February 2002 (age 24)	7	1	(Venezuelan Football Federation) Caracas
	MF	Emerson Ruíz	1 March 2003 (age 23)	7	0	(Venezuelan Football Federation) Mineros de Guayana
	MF	Telasco Segovia	1 March 2003 (age 23)	5	2	(Portuguese Football Federation) Casa Pia
	MF	Manuel Sulbarán	8 October 2002 (age 24)	2	0	(Venezuelan Football Federation) Caracas
	MF	Anderson Contreras	31 March 2001 (age 25)	1	0	(Venezuelan Football Federation) Caracas
	MF	Daniel De Sousa	13 December 2004 (age 21)	1	0	(Venezuelan Football Federation) Universidad Central de Venezuela
	MF	Nicola Profeta	27 February 2006 (age 20)	1	0	(Colombian Football Federation) Deportivo Cali U20
	MF	Pedro Álvarez	1 February 2001 (age 25)	1	0	(Venezuelan Football Federation) Deportivo La Guaira
	MF	Jayson Martínez	12 July 2001 (age 25)	0	0	(Venezuelan Football Federation) Metropolitanos
	FW	Brayan Alcócer	17 August 2003 (age 23)	5	0	(Uruguayan Football Association) Boston River
	FW	Luifer Hernández	28 April 2001 (age 25)	3	1	(Venezuelan Football Federation) Academia Puerto Cabello
	FW	Kevin Kelsy	27 July 2004 (age 22)	1	0	(Ukrainian Association of Football) Shakhtar Donetsk
	FW	José Riasco	2 February 2004 (age 22)	1	0	(Uruguayan Football Association) Boston River
	FW	Bryan Castillo	14 May 2001 (age 25)	0	0	(Venezuelan Football Federation) Deportivo Táchira

=== Recent call-ups ===
The following players have been called up for the team in the last 12 months.

Pos.	Player	Date of birth (age)	Caps	Goals	Club	Latest call-up

- ^{PRE} Preliminary squad

== See also ==
- Venezuela national under-20 football team
- Venezuela national under-17 football team
- Venezuela national football team
- Venezuela national futsal team

== Honours ==
- Central American and Caribbean Games
  - Silver medal (1): 1990
- Bolivarian Games
  - Silver medal (4): 1951, 1965, 1970, 1977
  - Bronze medal (2): 1961, 1981

Friendly

- Maurice Revello Tournament
  - Runners-up (1): 2022
