= Bolivia national under-23 football team =

Bolivia Olympic
- Nickname: La Verde (The Green)
- Association: Bolivian Football Federation (FBF)
- Confederation: CONMEBOL (South America)
- Head coach: Antonio Carlos Zago
- FIFA code: BOL

The Bolivia national under-23 football team, also known as the Bolivia Olympic football team, represents Bolivia in international football competitions during Olympic Games and Pan American Games. The selection is limited to players under the age of 23, except for three overage players. The team is controlled by the Bolivian Football Federation.

== Competitive record ==
=== Olympic Games ===
Olympic Games record
Year	Host	Round	Pos.	GP	W	D	L	GS	GA
1992	(Spain) Barcelona	Did not qualify							
1996	(United States) Atlanta	Did not qualify							
2000	(Australia) Sydney	Did not qualify							
2004	(Greece) Athens	Did not qualify							
2008	(China) Beijing	Did not qualify							
2012	(United Kingdom) London	Did not qualify							
2016	(Brazil) Rio de Janeiro	Did not qualify							
2020	(Japan) Tokyo	Did not qualify							
2024	(France) Paris	Did not qualify							
Total		–	0/9	–	–	–	–	–	–

=== CONMEBOL Preolímpico ===
CONMEBOL Preolímpico record
Year	Host	Pos.	GP	W	D	L	GS	GA
1992	Paraguay	Group stage	3	0	0	3	1	9
1996	Argentina	Group stage	4	1	0	3	6	9
2000	Brazil	Group stage	4	0	0	4	4	12
2004	Chile	Group stage	4	0	0	4	5	10
2020	Colombia	Group stage	4	2	0	2	8	10
2024	Venezuela	Group stage	4	1	1	2	5	6
Total		Group stage	23	4	1	18	29	56

=== Pan American Games ===
Pan American Games record
Year	Host	Round	Pos.	GP	W	D	L	GS	GA
Until 1995	See Bolivia national football team								
1999	(Canada) Winnipeg	Did not qualify							
2003	(Dominican Republic) Santo Domingo	Did not qualify							
2007	(Brazil) Rio de Janeiro	The Under-17 team participated							
2011	(Mexico) Guadalajara	Did not qualify							
2015	(Canada) Toronto	Did not qualify							
2019	(Peru) Lima	Did not qualify							
2023	(Chile) Santiago	Did not qualify							
Total		-	-	-	-	-	-	-	-

== Results and fixtures ==
Win Draw Loss Fixture

== Players ==
=== Current squad ===
Head coach: (Brazil) Antonio Carlos Zago

The 23-man squad was announced on 7 January 2020.

No.	Pos.	Player	Date of birth (age)	Club
1	GK	Rubén Cordano	16 October 1998 (aged 21)	(Bolivian Football Federation) Blooming
2	DF	Sebastián Reyes	12 March 1997 (aged 22)	(Bolivian Football Federation) Jorge Wilstermann
3	DF	Wálter Antelo	9 October 2000 (aged 19)	(Bolivian Football Federation) Sport Boys Warnes
4	DF	Jairo Quinteros	7 February 2001 (aged 18)	(Bolivian Football Federation) Bolívar
5	DF	José María Carrasco	16 August 1997 (aged 22)	(Bolivian Football Federation) Blooming
6	DF	Antonio Bustamante	20 June 1997 (aged 22)	(Bolivian Football Federation) Blooming
7	MF	John García	13 April 2000 (aged 19)	(Bolivian Football Federation) Oriente Petrolero
8	MF	Moisés Villarroel	7 September 1998 (aged 21)	(Bolivian Football Federation) Jorge Wilstermann
9	FW	César Menacho	9 August 1999 (aged 20)	(Bolivian Football Federation) Blooming
10	MF	Henry Vaca	27 January 1998 (aged 21)	(Brazilian Football Confederation) Atlético Goianiense
11	FW	Bruno Miranda	10 February 1998 (aged 21)	(Bolivian Football Federation) Royal Pari
12	GK	John Jairo Cuéllar	15 October 1999 (aged 20)	(Bolivian Football Federation) Guabirá
13	MF	Moisés Calero	12 September 1998 (aged 21)	(Bolivian Football Federation) The Strongest
14	MF	Franz Gonzales	26 June 2000 (aged 19)	(Bolivian Football Federation) Sport Boys Warnes
15	DF	Rodrigo Cabrera	6 February 1997 (aged 22)	(Bolivian Football Federation) Royal Pari
16	DF	Alex Arano	14 March 1998 (aged 21)	(Bolivian Football Federation) Blooming
17	DF	Roberto Fernández	12 July 1999 (aged 20)	(Bolivian Football Federation) Bolívar
18	FW	Fernando Saldías	27 February 1997 (aged 22)	(Bolivian Football Federation) Oriente Petrolero
19	FW	Víctor Abrego	11 February 1997 (aged 22)	(Bolivian Football Federation) Destroyers
20	MF	Robert Cueto	27 May 1999 (aged 20)	(Bolivian Football Federation) Blooming
21	MF	Ronaldo Sánchez	24 April 1997 (aged 22)	(Bolivian Football Federation) Oriente Petrolero
22	FW	Layonel Figueroa	6 July 1999 (aged 20)	(Bolivian Football Federation) Royal Pari
23	GK	Leonardo Claros	4 March 1998 (aged 21)	(Bolivian Football Federation) Always Ready

== Honours ==
- CONMEBOL Preolímpico
  - Third place (1): 1987
- Bolivarian Games
  - Gold medal (2): 1970, 1977
  - Silver medal (1): 1947-48 (shared)
  - Bronze medal (2): 1965, 1973 (shared)
