= Franchesco Flores =

Peruvian footballer (born 2001)

Personal information
- Full name: Franchesco Angel Flores Ayo
- Date of birth: 15 June 2001 (age 25)
- Place of birth: Pisco, Peru
- Height: 1.70 m (5 ft 7 in)
- Position: Midfielder

Team information
- Current team: Alianza Atlético
- Number: 33

Youth career
- 2013–2014: Academia Buscando una Estrella
- 2015: Deportivo Cali de Ica
- 2016: Deportivo Leticia
- 2016: Academia Los Pumas
- 2017: Universitario

Senior career*
Years	Team	Apps	(Gls)
2018	Willy Serrato	20	(1)
2019–2025	César Vallejo	23	(4)
2022	→ UTC (loan)	3	(0)
2022	→ U. San Martín (loan)	8	(0)
2025	Deportivo Binacional	20	(1)
2025–	Alianza Atlético	7	(0)
- * Club domestic league appearances and goals as of 30 December 2025

Franchesco Angel Flores Ayo (born 15 June 2001) is a Peruvian footballer who plays as a midfielder for Alianza Atlético.

== Career statistics ==
=== Club ===
As of December 31, 2023

Club	Season	League			Cup		Continental		Total	
Club	Season	Division	Apps	Goals	Apps	Goals	Apps	Goals	Apps	Goals
Serrato Pacasmayo	2018	2.ª	20	1	0	0	–		20	1
Serrato Pacasmayo	Total		20	1	0	0	–		20	1
César Vallejo	2019	1.º	0	0	0	0	–		0	0
César Vallejo	2020	1.º	6	1	0	0	–		6	1
César Vallejo	2021	1.º	10	2	0	0	0	0	10	2
César Vallejo	Total		16	3	0	0	0	0	16	3
UTC	2022	1.º	3	0	0	0	–		3	0
UTC	Total		3	0	0	0	–		3	0
San Martín	2022	1.º	8	0	0	0	–		8	0
San Martín	Total		8	0	0	0	–		8	0
César Vallejo	2023	1.º	2	1	0	0	–		2	1
César Vallejo	2024	1.º	0	0	0	0	–		0	0
César Vallejo	Total		2	1	0	0	–		2	1
Total Carrera			49	5	0	0	0	0	49	5
