= Sergio Bareiro =

Paraguayan footballer (born 1998)

Personal information
- Full name: Sergio Bareiro
- Date of birth: 4 November 1998 (age 28)
- Place of birth: Paraguay
- Height: 1.82 m (5 ft 11 1/2 in)
- Position: Forward

Team information
- Current team: 2 de Mayo
- Number: 9

Senior career*
Years	Team	Apps	(Gls)
2016–2017	General Díaz	13	(0)
2017–2018	Huachipato	10	(1)
2019–2020	General Díaz	44	(8)
2020	Cerro Porteño	3	(0)
2021	Necaxa	7	(0)
2021	→ Cerro Porteño (loan)	6	(0)
2022–2024	Guaraní	10	(1)
2022	→ Guanacasteca (loan)	3	(1)
2023–2024	→ Sportivo Ameliano (loan)	42	(5)
2024	Nacional	12	(1)
2025–	2 de Mayo	19	(4)
- * Club domestic league appearances and goals as of 13 August 2025

Sergio Bareiro (born 4 November 1998) is a Paraguayan footballer who plays for 2 de Mayo.
