= Aarón Quirós =

Argentine association football player (born 2001)

Aaron Quirós
Personal information
- Full name: Aaron Facundo Quirós
- Date of birth: 31 October 2001 (age 24)
- Place of birth: Monte Grande
- Height: 1.77 m (5 ft 10 in)
- Position: Defender

Team information
- Current team: Atlante (on loan from Vélez Sarsfield)
- Number: 44

Youth career
- –2021: Banfield

Senior career*
Years	Team	Apps	(Gls)
2021–2024	Banfield	57	(3)
2024–	Vélez Sarsfield	37	(0)
2026–	→ Atlante (loan)	0	(0)

International career
2024–	Argentina U23	4	(2)
- * Club domestic league appearances and goals as of 29 July 2026

Aaron Facundo Quirós (born 31 October 2001) is an Argentine professional footballer who plays as a defender for Liga MX club Atlante, on loan from AFA Liga Profesional de Fútbol club Vélez Sarsfield.

== Club career ==
A native of Monte Grande, he joined the Banfield youth team at the age of seven years-old. Quirós made his senior first team debut on April 11, 2021, against Rosario Central. On September 10, 2022, scored his first goal in the 2–1 victory against Colón. He signed a new two-year contract on 15 September 2022. In 2023, he became a regular starter for the team. On March 13, 2023, he scored what was the winning goal in a 1–0 win against Boca Juniors.

On 15 July 2024, Vélez Sarsfield announced they had signed Quirós on a three-year contract.

On 28 July 2026, Quirós was loaned to Liga MX club Atlante.

== Style of play ==
A left footed defender, he has displayed the ability to score left-footed direct free kicks.

== International career ==
In January 2024 he was called up to the Argentina U23 side for the pre-Olympic qualifying tournament. He scored goals against Chile U23 and Uruguay U23 as Argentina qualified for the Paris 2024 Olympics.

== Honours ==
Vélez Sarsfield

- Argentine Primera División: 2024
- Supercopa Internacional: 2024
