= 2000 CONMEBOL Pre-Olympic Tournament =

Tournament details
- Host country: Brazil
- Dates: 19 January – 6 February
- Teams: 10
- Venue: 2 (in 2 host cities)

Final positions
- Champions: Brazil (7th title)
- Runners-up: Chile
- Third place: Argentina
- Fourth place: Uruguay

Tournament statistics
- Matches played: 26
- Goals scored: 100 (3.85 per match)
- Top scorer: (Brazil) Ronaldinho (9 goals)

The 2000 CONMEBOL Pre-Olympic Tournament began on 19 January 2000 and was the 11th CONMEBOL Pre-Olympic Tournament. This was the 3rd tournament open to players under the age of 23 without any other restriction. There was no qualification stage and all 10 members of CONMEBOL automatically qualified. The winner and the runner-up qualified for 2000 Summer Olympics. Players born on or after 1 January 1977 were eligible to play in this competition.

== Group A ==
Team	Pld	W	D	L	GF	GA	GD	Pts
Brazil	4	3	1	0	15	1	+14	10
Chile	4	2	1	1	7	7	0	7
Colombia	4	2	1	1	10	13	-3	7
Venezuela	4	1	1	2	5	9	-4	4
Ecuador	4	0	0	4	5	12	-7	0

19 January 2000

Colombia	4–2	Ecuador
Viveros 6'; Candelo 33' (pen.), 45' (pen.); Castillo 47'	Report	Candelario 24'; Kaviedes 38'

Estádio do Café, Londrina
Attendance: 50,000
Referee: Daniel Gimenez (Argentina)
19 January 2000

Brazil	1–1	Chile
Alex 63'	Report	Pizarro 79'

Estádio do Café, Londrina
Attendance: 50,000
Referee: Carlos Amarilla (Paraguay)

21 January 2000

Chile	2–1	Ecuador
Tapia 43' (pen.), 89' (pen.)	Report	Reasco 19'

Estádio do Café, Londrina
Attendance: 1,000
Referee: Jorge Torres (Peru)
21 January 2000

Colombia	1–1	Venezuela
Castillo 28'	Report	Vielma 82'

Estádio do Café, Londrina
Attendance: 1,000
Referee: Saúl Feldman (Uruguay)

23 January 2000

Chile	3–0	Venezuela
Tapia 43', 58'; Neira 57'	Report

Estádio do Café, Londrina
Attendance: 10,000
Referee: Juan Carlos Paniagua (Bolivia)
23 January 2000

Brazil	2–0	Ecuador
Ronaldinho 18'; Alex 80'	Report

Estádio do Café, Londrina
Attendance: 20,000
Referee: Saúl Feldman (Uruguay)

26 January 2000

Colombia	5–1	Chile
Muñoz 16', 30', 54'; Quintana 59'; Candelo 60'	Report	Gutiérrez 87'

Estádio do Café, Londrina
Attendance: 10,000
Referee: Carlos Amarilla (Paraguay)
26 January 2000

Brazil	3–0	Venezuela
Ronaldinho 10', 85' (pen.); Lucas 65'	Report

Estádio do Café, Londrina
Attendance: 14,000
Referee: Juan Carlos Paniagua (Bolivia)

30 January 2000

Ecuador	2–4	Venezuela
Ayoví 67'; Kaviedes 73'	Report	Rojas 26', 38'; García 38'; Arango 48'

Estádio do Café, Londrina
Attendance: 15,000
Referee: Saúl Feldman (Uruguay)
30 January 2000

Brazil	9–0	Colombia
Álvaro 8'; Ronaldinho 16', 90' (pen.); Edu 22', 37'; Athirson 44'; Adriano Gabiru 65'; Lucas 72'; Warley 82'	Report

Estádio do Café, Londrina
Attendance: 25,000
Referee: Daniel Gimenez (Argentina)

== Group B ==
Team	Pld	W	D	L	GF	GA	GD	Pts
Uruguay	4	4	0	0	7	2	+5	12
Argentina	4	2	1	1	7	4	+3	7
Peru	4	2	1	1	10	8	+2	7
Paraguay	4	1	0	3	7	9	-2	3
Bolivia	4	0	0	4	4	12	-8	0

18 January 2000

Uruguay	2–0	Peru
García 5'; Franco 78'	Report

Estádio Olímpico Regional Arnaldo Busatto, Cascavel
Attendance: 23,000
Referee: Luciano Almeida (Brazil)
18 January 2000

Argentina	3–1	Paraguay
Cufré 45'; Placente 74'; Biagini 83'	Report	Candia 40'

Estádio Olímpico Regional Arnaldo Busatto, Cascavel
Attendance: 23,000
Referee: Byron Moreno (Ecuador)

20 January 2000

Paraguay	3–1	Bolivia
Cuevas 5'; Ramírez 29' (pen.); Paredes 90+1'	Report	Gutiérrez 72'

Estádio Olímpico Regional Arnaldo Busatto, Cascavel
Attendance: 5,000
Referee: Henry Cervantes (Colombia)
20 January 2000

Argentina	1–1	Peru
Cufré 75'	Report	Pizarro 10'

Estádio Olímpico Regional Arnaldo Busatto, Cascavel
Attendance: 2,000
Referee: Guido Aros (Chile)

22 January 2000

Paraguay	3–4	Peru
Santa Cruz 39', 62'; Pérez 65'	Report	Pizarro 54', 59', 76'; Gómez 67'

Estádio Olímpico Regional Arnaldo Busatto, Cascavel
Attendance: 1,000
Referee: Byron Moreno (Ecuador)
22 January 2000

Uruguay	2–1	Bolivia
García 8'; Olivera 48' (pen.)	Report	Suárez 85'

Estádio Olímpico Regional Arnaldo Busatto, Cascavel
Attendance: 1,000
Referee: Paolo Borgosano (Venezuela)

25 January 2000

Uruguay	1–0	Paraguay
Melono 13'	Report

Estádio Olímpico Regional Arnaldo Busatto, Cascavel
Attendance: 1,500
Referee: Guido Aros (Chile)
25 January 2000

Argentina	2–0	Bolivia
Romeo 65'; Riquelme 90' (pen.)	Report

Estádio Olímpico Regional Arnaldo Busatto, Cascavel
Attendance: 1,500
Referee: Henry Cervantes (Colombia)

29 January 2000

Peru	5–2	Bolivia
Lobatón 45', 51', 85', 88'; Pizarro 78'	Report	Suárez 76'; Peña 82' (pen.)

Estádio Olímpico Regional Arnaldo Busatto, Cascavel
Attendance: 4,000
Referee: Paolo Borgosano (Venezuela)
29 January 2000

Argentina	1–2	Uruguay
Cambiasso 23'	Report	Olivera 59' (pen.); Coelho 63'

Estádio Olímpico Regional Arnaldo Busatto, Cascavel
Attendance: 4,000
Referee: Luciano Almeida (Brazil)

== Final Group ==
Team	Pld	W	D	L	GF	GA	GD	Pts
Brazil	3	2	1	0	9	5	+4	7
Chile	3	2	0	1	6	4	+2	6
Argentina	3	1	0	2	5	5	0	3
Uruguay	3	0	1	2	3	9	-6	1

2 February 2000

Chile	4–1	Uruguay
Gutiérrez 26'; Tapia 47'; Ríos 75'; Pizarro 80'	Report	Coelho 42'

Estádio do Café, Londrina
Attendance: 50,000
Referee: Daniel Giménez (Argentina)
2 February 2000

Brazil	4–2	Argentina
Ronaldinho 2', 35', 78'; Alex 18'	Report	Romeo 5'; Cambiasso 21'

Estádio do Café, Londrina
Attendance: 50,000
Referee: Carlos Amarilla (Paraguay)

4 February 2000

Argentina	3–0	Uruguay
Scaloni 61'; Messera 64', 78'	Report

Estádio do Café, Londrina
Attendance: 15,000
Referee: Byron Moreno (Ecuador)
4 February 2000

Brazil	3–1	Chile
Athirson 31'; Ronaldinho 46'; Baiano 60'	Report	Tapia 15'

Estádio do Café, Londrina
Attendance: 22,000
Referee: Henry Cervantes (Colombia)

6 February 2000

Argentina	0–1	Chile
	Report	Navia 86'

Estádio do Café, Londrina
Attendance: 25,000
Referee: Carlos Amarilla (Paraguay)
6 February 2000

Brazil	2–2	Uruguay
Bilica 4'; Pereira 87'	Report	Risso 48'; Varela 59'

Estádio do Café, Londrina
Attendance: 35,000
Referee: Juan Carlos Paniagua (Bolivia)
