= Moisés Villarroel (Bolivian footballer) =

Bolivian footballer (born 1998)

Personal information
- Full name: Moisés Villarroel Angulo
- Date of birth: 7 September 1998 (age 28)
- Place of birth: Santa Cruz de la Sierra, Bolivia
- Height: 1.75 m (5 ft 9 in)
- Position: Midfielder

Team information
- Current team: Blooming
- Number: 8

Youth career
- 2009–2014: Blooming
- 2015: Universidad de Chile

Senior career*
Years	Team	Apps	(Gls)
2013–2015	Blooming	20	(1)
2015	Universidad de Chile	0	(0)
2016–2018	Bolívar	24	(1)
2017	→ Oriente Petrolero (loan)	29	(5)
2019–2022	Jorge Wilstermann	78	(7)
2022–2023	Bolívar	23	(0)
2023	Águilas Doradas	17	(0)
2024	Guabirá	10	(2)
2024–	Blooming	53	(13)

International career^{‡}
2013–2015	Bolivia U17	7	(0)
2017	Bolivia U20	3	(0)
2018–	Bolivia	32	(1)
- * Club domestic league appearances and goals as of 30 December 2025 ‡ National team caps and goals as of 21:07, 18 November 2025 (UTC)

Moisés Villarroel Angulo (born 7 September 1998) is a Bolivian professional footballer who plays as a midfielder for Blooming and the Bolivian national team.

== Club career ==
Villarroel began his football career at the youth ranks of hometown club Blooming at age 10. He made his top flight debut on 26 May 2013, during a league match against Petrolero under manager Néstor Clausen. During his spell at Blooming he had 20 appearances in the Liga de Fútbol Profesional Boliviano and scored one goal. Due to his impressive performance at such a young age, in July 2015 he signed for Universidad de Chile, staying for about six months with both the youth and the first team.

== International career ==
In March 2015, Villarroel participated with the Bolivia U17 national team in the South American U-17 championship in Paraguay, but the squad did not qualify to the FIFA U-17 World Cup held later that year.

He was named in Bolivia's senior squad for a 2018 FIFA World Cup qualifier against Venezuela in November 2015.

== Career statistics ==
As of match played 18 November 2025

Appearances and goals by national team and year
National team	Year	Apps	Goals
Bolivia	2018	1	0
Bolivia	2020	1	0
Bolivia	2021	11	1
Bolivia	2022	7	0
Bolivia	2023	5	0
Bolivia	2024	1	0
Bolivia	2025	6	0
Total		32	1

Scores and results list Bolivia's goal tally first.

No.	Date	Venue	Opponent	Score	Result	Competition
1.	14 October 2021	Estadio Hernando Siles, La Paz, Bolivia	Paraguay	2–0	4–0	2022 FIFA World Cup qualification
