= Ignacio Risso =

Uruguayan footballer and manager (born 1977)

Personal information
- Full name: Ignacio Risso Thomasset
- Date of birth: 8 October 1977 (age 49)
- Place of birth: Montevideo, Uruguay
- Height: 1.87 m (6 ft 2 in)
- Position: Forward

Team information
- Current team: Liverpool Montevideo (assistant)

Senior career*
Years	Team	Apps	(Gls)
1998–1999	Miramar Misiones	24	(12)
1999–2002	Danubio	89	(39)
2002–2003	Lanús	30	(6)
2003	LDU Quito	21	(3)
2004	Lanús	16	(1)
2004–2005	Danubio	45	(21)
2005–2006	Quilmes	23	(4)
2006–2007	Ponferradina	35	(9)
2007–2009	Apollon Limassol	47	(17)
2009–2015	Defensor Sporting	180	(52)

Managerial career
- 2015–2019: Defensor Sporting (youth)
- 2019: Defensor Sporting
- 2022: Albion
- 2024–: Liverpool Montevideo (assistant)
- * Club domestic league appearances and goals

Ignacio Risso Thomasset (born 8 October 1977 in Montevideo) is a Uruguayan football manager and former player who played as a forward. He is the current assistant manager of Liverpool Montevideo.

== Coaching career ==
=== Defensor Sporting ===
After retiring, Risso immediately became a part of Defensor Sporting's technical staff. On 1 April 2019, he was promoted to head coach. After failing to qualify for any international cup, the club announced that Risso had been fired on 12 December 2019.
