= Héctor Tapia =

Chilean footballer and manager (born 1977)

Personal information
- Full name: Héctor Santiago Tapia Urdile
- Date of birth: 30 September 1977 (age 49)
- Place of birth: Santiago, Chile
- Height: 1.75 m (5 ft 9 in)
- Position: Forward

Youth career
- Colo-Colo

Senior career*
Years	Team	Apps	(Gls)
1994–1998	Colo-Colo	82	(32)
1999	Universidad Católica	15	(9)
1999–2000	Perugia	4	(0)
2001	Colo-Colo	27	(24)
2002	Palestino	26	(24)
2003–2004	Lille	37	(5)
2004	Cruzeiro	22	(4)
2005	Colo-Colo	30	(16)
2006	Unión Española	22	(0)
2006	FC Thun	10	(2)
2007	Palestino	14	(8)
2007–2008	Universidad Católica	32	(14)
2009	Palestino	31	(8)

International career
1993	Chile U17		
1995	Chile U20		
1997–2004	Chile	14	(3)
2000	Chile U23		

Managerial career
- 2012: Colo-Colo B
- 2013: Colo-Colo (assistant)
- 2013–2015: Colo-Colo
- 2016: Everton
- 2018: Colo-Colo
- 2019: Real Garcilaso
- 2020–2021: Deportes Antofagasta
- 2021: Coquimbo Unido
- * Club domestic league appearances and goals

Héctor Tapia

Héctor Santiago Tapia Urdile (born 30 September 1977), also known as Tito Tapia, is a Chilean football manager and former player who played as a forward.

== Club career ==
Tapia has played for Colo Colo, Universidad Católica, Palestino and Unión Española in Chile, Cruzeiro in Brazil, Lille OSC in France, Perugia in Italy and FC Thun in Switzerland.

In 2008 Tapia received an offer from Royal Excelsior Mouscron, but he decided to stay at La Católica.

In 2013 Tapia began his manager career at Colo-Colo.

On 2018 he coached Colo-Colo for the second time in his career.

== International career ==
Tapia debuted for his country in 1997 and has 14 caps and 3 goals.

== Career statistics ==
#	Date	Venue	Opponent	Score	Result	Competition
1.	22 March 2000	Estadio Nacional, Santiago	Honduras	5–2	Win	Friendly
2.	25 July 2000	Polideportivo de Pueblo Nuevo, San Cristóbal	Venezuela	0–2	Win	FIFA World Cup qualification
3.	15 January 2001	Salt Lake Stadium, Kolkata	Bahrain	2–0	Win	Friendly

== Coaching career ==
Tapia started his career as assistant coach of Gustavo Benítez in Colo-Colo.

In February 2025, Tapia assumed as head of the Colo-Colo youth system.

== Honours ==
=== Player ===
Colo-Colo

- Primera División de Chile (3): 1996, 1997 Clausura, 1998
- Copa Chile (2): 1994, 1996

Lille

- UEFA Intertoto Cup: 2004

Cruzeiro

- Campeonato Mineiro: 2004

Chile

- FIFA U-17 World Championship third place: 1993

Chile Olympic

- Football at the Summer Olympics bronze medal: 2000

Individual

- Primera División de Chile top scorer: 2001

=== Manager ===
Colo-Colo

- Primera División de Chile: 2014 Clausura

Coquimbo Unido

- Primera B de Chile: 2021
