= Sebastián Reyes =

Bolivian footballer (born 1997)

Personal information
- Full name: Juan Sebastián Reyes Farrel
- Date of birth: March 12, 1997 (age 29)
- Place of birth: Cochabamba, Bolivia
- Height: 1.89 m (6 ft 2 in)
- Position: Centre back

Youth career
- 2010–2012: Club Petrolero

Senior career*
Years	Team	Apps	(Gls)
2012–2013	Club Petrolero	0	(0)
2014–2021	Wilstermann	58	(0)
2016–2017	→ Club Petrolero (loan)	9	(0)
2022–2023	Bolívar	18	(0)
2023	Palmaflor	10	(0)
2024	Oriente Petrolero	5	(0)

International career^{‡}
2007	Bolivia U20	4	(0)
2020	Bolivia U23	4	(1)
2020–	Bolivia	2	(0)
- * Club domestic league appearances and goals as of 28 May 2024 ‡ National team caps and goals as of 7 January 2023

Sebastián Reyes (born 12 March 1997) is a Bolivian professional footballer who plays as a defender for Oriente Petrolero in the Bolivian Primera División.

== Club career ==
From Cochabamba, Reyes plays predominantly as a left-sided centre-back, but is also capable of playing left back. He played for C.D. Jorge Wilstermann and Club Bolivar, prior to playing for Palmaflor, featuring in the Copa Sudamericana. He joined Oriente Petrolero in June 2023.

== International career ==
On 20 November 2018 Reyes made his debut for the Bolivia national football team against Iraq.

== Titles ==
- (Bolivia) Wilstermann 2015/16 (Torneo Clausura Bolivian Primera División)
- (Bolivia) Wilstermann 2018 (Torneo Apertura Bolivian Primera División)
- (Bolivia) Wilstermann 2019 (Torneo Clausura Bolivian Primera División)
