= 1996 CONMEBOL Pre-Olympic Tournament =

Tournament details
- Host country: Argentina
- Dates: 18 February - 6 March
- Teams: 10
- Venue: (in 2 host cities)

Final positions
- Champions: Brazil
- Runners-up: Argentina
- Third place: Uruguay
- Fourth place: Venezuela

Tournament statistics
- Matches played: 26
- Goals scored: 102 (3.92 per match)
- Top scorer: Marcelo Delgado (8 goals)

The 1996 CONMEBOL Pre-Olympic Tournament began on 18 February 1996 and was the 10th CONMEBOL Pre-Olympic Tournament. This was the second tournament open to players under the age of 23 without any other restriction. There was no qualification stage and all 10 members of CONMEBOL automatically qualified. The winner and the runner-up qualified for 1996 Summer Olympics. Players born on or after 1 January 1973 were eligible to play in this competition.

== Venues ==
Tandil	Mar del Plata
Estadio General San Martin	Estadio José María Minella
37.332937°S 59.144055°W	38.017944°S 57.582333°W
Buenos Aires Province (Argentina)

== Group stage ==
=== Group 1 ===
Pos	Team	Pld	W	D	L	GF	GA	GD	Pts	Qualification
1	Brazil (A)	4	3	1	0	11	3	+8	10	Final Round
2	Uruguay (A)	4	3	1	0	9	4	+5	10	Final Round
3	Bolivia	4	1	0	3	6	9	−3	3	
4	Paraguay	4	1	0	3	8	12	−4	3	
5	Peru	4	1	0	3	7	13	−6	3	

Rules for classification: 1) Points; 2) Goal difference; 3) Number of goals scored;
(A) Advance to a further round
18 February 1996

Brazil	4–1	Peru

Tandil
19 February 1996

Bolivia	0–2	Uruguay

Tandil
21 February 1996

Brazil	3–1	Paraguay

Tandil
21 February 1996

Peru	2–4	Uruguay

Tandil
23 February 1996
19:00 (UTC-3)

Bolivia	1–4	Brazil

Tandil
23 February 1996
22:10 (UTC-3)

Paraguay	4–2	Peru

Tandil
25 February 1996

Peru	2–1	Bolivia

Tandil
25 February 1996

Uruguay	3–2	Paraguay

Tandil
27 February 1996

Paraguay	1–4	Bolivia

Tandil
27 February 1996

Uruguay	0–0	Brazil

Tandil

=== Group 2 ===
Pos	Team	Pld	W	D	L	GF	GA	GD	Pts	Qualification
1	Argentina (A)	4	4	0	0	15	1	+14	12	Final Round
2	Venezuela (A)	4	2	1	1	6	5	+1	7	Final Round
3	Chile	4	1	2	1	8	5	+3	5	
4	Colombia	4	0	2	2	6	11	−5	2	
5	Ecuador	4	0	1	3	5	18	−13	1	

Rules for classification: 1) Points; 2) Goal difference; 3) Number of goals scored;
(A) Advance to a further round
18 February 1996

Argentina	6–0	Ecuador

Mar del Plata
18 February 1996

Venezuela	1–0	Colombia

Mar del Plata
20 February 1996

Argentina	2–1	Chile

Mar del Plata
20 February 1996

Ecuador	3–3	Colombia

Mar del Plata
22 February 1996

Chile	4–0	Ecuador

Mar del Plata
22 February 1996

Venezuela	0–3	Argentina

Mar del Plata
24 February 1996

Colombia	3–3	Chile

Mar del Plata
24 February 1996

Ecuador	2–5	Venezuela

Mar del Plata
26 February 1996

Chile	0–0	Venezuela

Mar del Plata
26 February 1996

Colombia	0–4	Argentina

Mar del Plata

== Final round ==
Pos	Team	Pld	W	D	L	GF	GA	GD	Pts	Qualification
1	Brazil (Q)	3	2	1	0	10	3	+7	7	1996 Summer Olympics
2	Argentina (Q)	3	2	1	0	6	2	+4	7	1996 Summer Olympics
3	Uruguay	3	1	0	2	4	6	−2	3	
4	Venezuela	3	0	0	3	1	10	−9	0	

Rules for classification: 1) Points; 2) Goal difference; 3) Number of goals scored;
(Q) Qualified for the phase indicated
1 March 1996

Brazil	5–0	Venezuela

Tandil
1 March 1996

Argentina	2–0	Uruguay

Mar del Plata
3 March 1996

Brazil	3–1	Uruguay

Mar del Plata
3 March 1996

Argentina	2–0	Venezuela

Mar del Plata
6 March 1996
19:00

Uruguay	3–1	Venezuela

Mar del Plata
6 March 1996
21:30

Brazil	2–2	Argentina

Mar del Plata

== Broadcasting rights ==
- Ecuador: Canal UNO
- Brazil: Rede Globo, TV Bandeirantes
