= Colombia Olympic football team results =

This is a list of the Colombia Olympic football team results since its first match in 1950.

== Matches ==
=== Amateur era ===
==== 1950 ====
26 February Match 1	Guatemala	2–1	Colombia	Guatemala City, Guatemala
	Camposeco (??)	Report		Stadium: Estadio Mateo Flores

28 February Match 2	Mexico	2–4	Colombia	Guatemala City, Guatemala
	V. Ramírez (??); Farfán (??)	Report	Gallegos (??); A. Pérez (??); Arenilla (??)	Stadium: Estadio Mateo Flores; Attendance: 20,000; Referee: Giuseppe Carpani (Italy)

3 March Match 3	Honduras	2–0	Colombia	Guatemala City, Guatemala
		Report		Stadium: Estadio Mateo Flores

==== 1951 ====
6 December Match 4	Peru	0–1	Colombia	Caracas, Venezuela
		Report	Mendoza 31'	Stadium: Estadio Olímpico; Referee: Giuseppe Carpani (Italy)

9 December Match 5	Colombia	1–2	Panama	Caracas, Venezuela
		Report		Stadium: Estadio Olímpico; Referee: Esteban Marino (Uruguay)

12 December Match 6	Colombia	2–1	Ecuador	Caracas, Venezuela
	Villa (??)	Report	Espinosa (??)	Stadium: Estadio Olímpico

16 December Match 7	Venezuela	1–2	Colombia	Caracas, Venezuela
	C. Díaz (??)	Report	Villa (??)	Stadium: Estadio Olímpico

==== 1954 ====
9 March Match 8	El Salvador	2–2	Colombia	Mexico City, Mexico
	O. Hernández 2'; Barraza 53'	Report	Rengifo 34', 89'	Stadium: Estadio Olímpico Universitario

12 March Match 9	Mexico	1–0	Colombia	Mexico City, Mexico
		Report		Stadium: Estadio Olímpico Universitario

13 March Match 10	Panama	1–2	Colombia	Mexico City, Mexico
		Report		Stadium: Estadio Olímpico Universitario

15 March Match 11	Cuba	1–2	Colombia	Mexico City, Mexico
		Report		Stadium: Estadio Olímpico Universitario

==== 1959 ====
20 December Match 12	Colombia	2–0	Brazil	Bogotá, Colombia
	Home 34', 55' (Note: Some sources indicate the scorer of the second goal as Carlos Campillo.)	Report		Stadium: Estadio El Campín; Referee: Menéndez (Mexico)

27 December Match 13	Brazil	7–1	Colombia	Rio de Janeiro, Brazil
	China 18', 22'; Manoelzinho 32', 50', 57' (Note: Some sources indicate the scorer of the 50th-minute goal as China.); Germano 34'; Lombaña 64' (o.g.)	Report	Manjarrés 80'	Stadium: Maracanã; Referee: Juan Brozzi (Argentina)

==== 1961 ====
4 December Match 14	Peru	3–2	Colombia	Barranquilla, Colombia
	García (??); Salguero (??)	Report	de la Peña (??); M. Pérez (??)	Stadium: Estadio Metropolitano

6 December Match 15	Colombia	1–0	Panama	Barranquilla, Colombia
	Calero (??)	Report		Stadium: Estadio Metropolitano

8 December Match 16	Venezuela	2–2	Colombia	Barranquilla, Colombia
	J. Gómez (??); Tovar (??)	Report	Amaris (??) de la Peña (??)	Stadium: Estadio Metropolitano

10 December Match 17	Colombia	1–0	Panama	Barranquilla, Colombia
	Segovia (??)	Report		Stadium: Estadio Metropolitano

12 December Match 18	Peru	2–0	Colombia	Barranquilla, Colombia
	García (??)	Report		Stadium: Estadio Metropolitano

14 December Match 19	Colombia	2–1	Venezuela	Barranquilla, Colombia
	M. Pérez (??)	Report	Vidal (??)	Stadium: Estadio Metropolitano

==== 1964 ====
8 May Match 20	Argentina	2–0	Colombia	Lima, Peru
	Malleo 50', 74'	Report		Stadium: Estadio Nacional

10 May Match 21	Peru	3–0	Colombia	Lima, Peru
	La Rosa (??)	Report		Stadium: Estadio Nacional

14 May Match 22	Brazil	1–1	Colombia	Lima, Peru
	Nélio (??)	Report	Padilla (??)	Stadium: Estadio Nacional; Referee: Jorge Cruzat (Chile)

18 May Match 23	Colombia	0–2	Chile	Lima, Peru
		Report	Tabilo 37'; Torres 45'	Stadium: Estadio Nacional

20 May Match 24	Colombia	4–1	Ecuador	Lima, Peru
	Caicedo 11', 68'; Caro 23'; Varela 90'	Report	Alvorado 55'	Stadium: Estadio Nacional

23 May Match 25	Uruguay	1–1	Colombia	Lima, Peru
	Fontora 77'	Report	Guerrero 45'	Stadium: Estadio Nacional

==== 1967 ====
24 July Match 26	Trinidad and Tobago	5–2	Colombia	Winnipeg, Canada
	Bronye 60', 87'; Breaza 63'; Small 79', 83'	Report	Tovar 35', 42'	Stadium: Alexander Park; Referee: José Minzal (Cuba)

26 July Match 27	Argentina	5–0	Colombia	Winnipeg, Canada
	C. García 7'; A. García 10', 19', 47'; Ponce 44'	Report		Stadium: Alexander Park

28 July Match 28	Mexico	3–0 (Note: Abandoned at 3-0 in 81' by the Colombian team.)	Colombia	Winnipeg, Canada
	Cerda 48'; Pereda 74' (pen.)	Report		Stadium: Alexander Park; Referee: Ken Douston (Bahamas)

==== 1968 ====
23 January Match 29	Mexico	3–1	Colombia	Mexico City, Mexico
	J. Álvarez 18', 36'; Pereda 26'	Report	Velásquez 90+2'	Stadium: Estadio Azteca

30 January Match 30	Mexico	3–0	Colombia	León, Mexico
	B. Hernández 24'; Bustos 39'; Estrada 80'	Report		Stadium: Estadio León

4 February Match 31	Guatemala	2–0	Colombia	Guatemala City, Guatemala
		Report

8 February Match 32	Costa Rica	3–1	Colombia	San José, Costa Rica
				Stadium: Estadio Ricardo Saprissa Aymá

19 March Match 33	Colombia	1–0	Ecuador	Bogotá, Colombia
	Santa (??)	Report		Stadium: Estadio El Campín

22 March Match 34	Colombia	2–1	Peru	Bogotá, Colombia
	Mosquera (??); Santa (??)	Report	Rivero (??)	Stadium: Estadio El Campín

27 March Match 35	Colombia	1–1	Uruguay	Bogotá, Colombia
	Retat (??)	Report	Eugui (??)	Stadium: Estadio El Campín

2 April Match 36	Colombia	4–2	Paraguay	Bogotá, Colombia
	Mesa (??); Pardo (??); Santa (??)	Report	Escobar (??); Sosa (??)	Stadium: Estadio El Campín

5 April Match 37	Colombia	2–0	Uruguay	Bogotá, Colombia
	Jaramillo (??)	Report		Stadium: Estadio El Campín

9 April Match 38	Colombia	0–3	Brazil	Bogotá, Colombia
		Report	China (??); Lauro (??)	Stadium: Estadio El Campín; Referee: Duval Goicoechea (Argentina)

18 August Match 39	Colombia	0–1	Argentina	Bogotá, Colombia
		Report	Savoy 89'	Stadium: Estadio El Campín; Referee: Iván Barrios (Venezuela)

22 September Match 40	Colombia	1–1	Costa Rica	Barranquilla, Colombia
				Stadium: Estadio Metropolitano

13 October Match 41	Mexico	1–0	Colombia	Mexico City, Mexico
12:00 CST	Estrada 6'	Report		Stadium: Estadio Azteca; Referee: István Zsolt (Hungary)

15 October Match 42	Guinea	3–2	Colombia	Puebla, Mexico
12:00 CST	Ndongo 26'; Bouya 58', 84'	Report	Santa 49'; Mosquera 66'	Stadium: Estadio Cuauhtémoc; Referee: Dimitar Rumenchev (Bulgaria)

17 October Match 43	Colombia	2–1	France	Puebla, Mexico
12:00 CST	Tamayo 14'; Jaramillo 35'	Report	Teamboueon 59'	Stadium: Estadio Cuauhtémoc; Referee: Karol Galba (Czechoslovakia)

==== 1970 ====
3 March Match 44	Colombia	2–1	Cuba	Panama City, Panama
	Samboni (??); Velásquez (??)	Report	Hernández Heres 2'	Stadium: Roberto Durán Arena

5 March Match 45	Colombia	7–2	Nicaragua	Panama City, Panama
	Velásquez (??); Arboleda (??); Torres (??); Garcés (??)	Report	Rivas (??); Romero (??)	Stadium: Roberto Durán Arena

7 March Match 46	Panama	0–3	Colombia	Panama City, Panama
		Report	Velásquez (??); Torres (??); Campaz (??)	Stadium: Roberto Durán Arena

9 March Match 47	Colombia	3–0	Venezuela	Panama City, Panama
	Garcés (??); Torres (??); Campaz (??)	Report		Stadium: Estadio Revolución

11 March Match 48	Colombia	1–0	Cuba	Panama City, Panama
	Torres 36'	Report		Stadium: Estadio Revolución

==== 1971 ====
31 July Match 49	Colombia	6–0	Bahamas	Cali, Colombia
	Monsalve (??); Quintero (??); Á. Torres (??); N. Torres (Note: Some sources indicate the scorer of the goal as Byron Hernández, instead of Nelson Torres.) (??)	Report		Stadium: Estadio Pascual Guerrero

2 August Match 50	Colombia	2–1	Canada	Cali, Colombia
	Morón (??); Monsalve (??)	Report	Zanatta (??)	Stadium: Estadio Pascual Guerrero; Attendance: 35,000; Referee: Horacio Fernández (Argentina)

3 August Match 51	Colombia	4–0 or 7–1 (Note: Result not confirmed.)	Dominican Republic	Cali, Colombia
	Rivas (??); F. González (??); Céspedes (??); Quintero (??) (Note: Some sources indicate the scorers of the goals as Leopoldo Rivas (2), Francisco Maturana (1), Héctor Céspedes (2) and Juan B. Quintero (2).)	Report	Delgado (??)	Stadium: Estadio Pascual Guerrero

7 August Match 52	Colombia	3–0	United States	Cali, Colombia
	Céspedes (??); Morón (??)	Report		Stadium: Estadio Pascual Guerrero

8 August Match 53	Colombia	2–3	Canada	Cali, Colombia
	Monsalve 27'; Morón 78'	Report	Young 24'; Schepers 49'; Parsons 59'	Stadium: Estadio Pascual Guerrero; Attendance: 50,000; Referee: José Pichardo (Dominican Republic)

9 August Match 54	Colombia	2–2	Trinidad and Tobago	Palmira, Colombia
	Monsalve (??); Quintero (??)	Report	David (??); Murren (??)	Stadium: Estadio Francisco Rivera Escobar

11 August Match 55	Colombia	2–1	Cuba	Cali, Colombia
	Torres (??); Morón (??)	Report	Hernández (??)	Stadium: Estadio Pascual Guerrero

12 August Match 56	Colombia	0–0	Argentina	Cali, Colombia
		Report		Stadium: Estadio Pascual Guerrero

26 November Match 57	Colombia	2–1	Uruguay	Bogotá, Colombia
	Andrade (??); Morón (??)	Report	Moncada (??)	Stadium: Estadio El Campín

28 November Match 58	Colombia	2–0	Venezuela	Bogotá, Colombia
	Andrade (??)	Report		Stadium: Estadio El Campín

1 December Match 59	Colombia	1–1	Peru	Bogotá, Colombia
	Morón (??)	Report	Larios (??)	Stadium: Estadio El Campín

5 December Match 60	Colombia	0–0	Paraguay	Bogotá, Colombia
		Report		Stadium: Estadio El Campín

7 December Match 61	Brazil	1–1	Colombia	Bogotá, Colombia
	Marquinhos (??)	Report	Santamaría (??)	Stadium: Estadio El Campín; Referee: Oscar Ortubé (Bolivia)

9 December Match 62	Colombia	0–0	Peru	Bogotá, Colombia
		Report		Stadium: Estadio El Campín

11 December Match 63	Colombia	1–1	Argentina	Bogotá, Colombia
	Andrade (??)	Report	J. Rodríguez (??)	Stadium: Estadio El Campín

==== 1972 ====
28 August Match 64	Poland	5–1	Colombia	Ingolstadt, West Germany
16:45 UTC+1	Deyna 16', 32'; Gadocha 42', 49', 72'	Report	Morón 63'	Stadium: ESV-Stadion; Attendance: 4,000; Referee: Ahmed Gindil Salhi (Sudan)

30 August Match 65	East Germany	6–1	Colombia	Passau, West Germany
16:30 UTC+1	Streich 1', 10'; Sparwasser 9'; Ducke 31'; Vogel 85'; Kreische 88' (pen.)	Report	Espinosa 38'	Stadium: Drei Flüsse Stadion; Attendance: 4,500; Referee: Abdelkader Aouissi (Algeria)

1 September Match 66	Colombia	3–1	Ghana	Munich, West Germany
21:00 UTC+1	Morón 56'; Torres 60'; Montaño 82'	Report	Sunday 79'	Stadium: Olympic Stadium; Attendance: 25,000; Referee: Kurt Tschenscher (West Germany)

==== 1973 ====
17 February Match 67	Peru	0–0	Colombia	Panama City, Panama
		Report		Stadium: Roberto Durán Arena

20 February Match 68	Colombia	3–0	Panama	Panama City, Panama
	Céspedes (??); Guzmán (??)	Report		Stadium: Roberto Durán Arena

23 February Match 69	Colombia	2–1	Bolivia	Panama City, Panama
	Céspedes (??); Umaña (??)	Report	Blanco (??)	Stadium: Roberto Durán Arena

25 February Match 70	Colombia	0–1	Peru	Panama City, Panama
		Report	de Souza (??)	Stadium: Roberto Durán Arena

27 February Match 71	Panama	2–4	Colombia	Panama City, Panama
	Anaya (??)	Report	Céspedes (??); Gallego (??); Lozano (??)	Stadium: Roberto Durán Arena

2 March Match 72	Bolivia	3–2	Colombia	Panama City, Panama
	A. García (??); Sánchez (??); Morales (??)	Report	Gallego (??); J. Gutiérrez (??)	Stadium: Roberto Durán Arena

==== 1976 ====
22 January Match 73	Peru	1–0	Colombia	Recife, Brazil
19:15 (UTC−03:00)	Montero (??)	Report		Stadium: Estádio do Arruda; Referee: Alberto Narváez (Mexico)

25 January Match 74	Brazil	4–0	Colombia	Recife, Brazil
17:30 (UTC−03:00)	Erivelto 3', 63'; Cláudio Adão 12'; Alberto Leguelé 18'	Report		Stadium: Estádio do Arruda; Attendance: 6,758; Referee: Juan Silvagno (Chile)

28 January Match 75	Argentina	2–2	Colombia	Recife, Brazil
21:00 (UTC−03:00)	Alfaro (??); Costas (??)	Report	Vilarete (??); Pachón (??)	Stadium: Estádio do Arruda

30 January Match 76	Colombia	1–0	Chile	Recife, Brazil
19:00 (UTC−03:00)	Vilarete (??)	Report		Stadium: Estádio do Arruda

1 February Match 77	Colombia	2–2	Uruguay	Recife, Brazil
15:30 (UTC−03:00)	Valverde (??); Monsalve (??)	Report	Pedetti (??); Ortiz (??)	Stadium: Estádio do Arruda; Referee: César Orozco Guerrero (Peru)

==== 1978 ====
9 July Match 78	Colombia	4–0	Venezuela	Medellín, Colombia
		Report		Stadium: Estadio Atanasio Girardot

11 July Match 79	Colombia	1–1	Mexico	Medellín, Colombia
		Report		Stadium: Estadio Atanasio Girardot

15 July Match 80	Colombia	5–1	Puerto Rico	Medellín, Colombia
		Report		Stadium: Estadio Atanasio Girardot

==== 1980 ====
5 January Match 81	Venezuela	0–0	Colombia	Caracas, Venezuela
		Report		Stadium: Estadio Olímpico

9 January Match 82	Venezuela	0–1	Colombia	San Cristóbal, Venezuela
		Report		Stadium: Estadio Polideportivo de Pueblo Nuevo

13 January Match 83	Colombia	1–1	Hungary B	Bogotá, Colombia
	Sarmiento 53'	Report	Szokolai 27'	Stadium: Estadio El Campín

17 January Match 84	Colombia	0–0	Romania	Cali, Colombia
		Report		Stadium: Estadio Olímpico Pascual Guerrero; Attendance: 22,000

24 January Match 85	Colombia	2–1	Peru	Bogotá, Colombia
	Cardona (??); Fiorillo (??)	Report	Cabrera (??)	Stadium: Estadio El Campín

27 January Match 86	Colombia	0–1	Venezuela	Cali, Colombia
		Report	Zubizaretta (??)	Stadium: Estadio Olímpico Pascual Guerrero

31 January Match 87	Colombia	3–1	Chile	Pereira, Colombia
	Agudelo (??)	Report	L. Gómez (??)	Stadium: Estadio Hernán Ramírez Villegas

6 February Match 88	Colombia	0–1	Bolivia	Barranquilla, Colombia
		Report	Figueroa (??)	Stadium: Estadio Romelio Martínez

10 February Match 89	Colombia	5–1	Brazil	Cali, Colombia
	Sarmiento (??); Agudelo (??); Cardona (??)	Report	João Luiz (??) (Note: Some sources indicate the scorer of the goal as Gérson Lopes.)	Stadium: Estadio Olímpico Pascual Guerrero; Referee: Gastón Castro (Chile)

15 February Match 90	Colombia	0–0	Argentina	Bogotá, Colombia
		Report		Stadium: Estadio El Campín; Referee: Luís Carlos Félix (Brazil)

28 May Match 91	Venezuela	1–4	Colombia	San Cristóbal, Venezuela
		Report		Stadium: Estadio Polideportivo de Pueblo Nuevo

19 June Match 92	Costa Rica	1–0	Colombia	San José, Costa Rica
		Report		Stadium: Estadio Nacional

21 July Match 93	Czechoslovakia	3–0	Colombia	Leningrad, Soviet Union
19:00 UTC+4	Pokluda 14'; Berger 18'; Vízek 85'	Report		Stadium: Kirov Stadium; Referee: Belaid Lacarne (Algeria)

23 July Match 94	Colombia	1–1	Kuwait	Moscow, Soviet Union
20:00 UTC+4	Molinares 73'	Report	Yaqoub 64'	Stadium: Dinamo Stadium; Referee: Anders Mattson (Finland)

25 July Match 95	Colombia	1–0	Nigeria	Leningrad, Soviet Union
20:00 UTC+4	Cardona 55'	Report		Stadium: Kirov Stadium; Referee: Salim Naji Al-Hachami (Iraq)

==== 1981 ====
6 December Match 96	Colombia	3–0	Bolivia	Barquisimeto, Venezuela
				Stadium: Estadio de Barquisimeto

8 December Match 97	Colombia	1–1	Venezuela	Barquisimeto, Venezuela
				Stadium: Estadio de Barquisimeto

14 December Match 98	Peru	2–1	Colombia	Barquisimeto, Venezuela
				Stadium: Estadio de Barquisimeto

==== 1984 ====
23 January Match 99	El Salvador	0–1	Colombia	San Salvador, El Salvador
		Report	Angulo (??)	Stadium: Estadio Cuscatlán; Attendance: 12,000

26 January Match 100	Honduras	0–0	Colombia	Tegucigalpa, Honduras
				Stadium: Estadio Tiburcio Carías Andino

29 January Match 101	Colombia	2–1	Poland	Cali, Colombia
				Stadium: Estadio Olímpico Pascual Guerrero

8 February Match 102	Ecuador	3–0	Colombia	Guayaquil, Ecuador
	Vásquez 40'; Cuvi 58'; Vega 72'	Report		Stadium: Estadio Modelo; Referee: Jorge Romero (Argentina)

12 February Match 103	Brazil	2–1	Colombia	Guayaquil, Ecuador
	Riascos 27' (o.g.); Dunga 75'	Report	V. Pérez 37'	Stadium: Estadio Modelo; Referee: Sergio Vásquez (Chile)

==== 1986 ====
24 November Match 104	Argentina	3–1	Colombia	Concepción, Chile
	Perazzo 6', 80'; Acosta 16'	Report	A. González 63'	Stadium: Estadio Municipal de Concepción

28 November Match 105	Colombia	1–0	Uruguay	Concepción, Chile
	Girón 90'	Report		Stadium: Estadio Municipal de Concepción; Referee: Jorge Orellana (Ecuador)

30 November Match 106	Colombia	4–2	Peru	Concepción, Chile
	Calero 2'; González Palacios 28'; W. Rodriguez 48'; A. González 64'	Report	Bazalar 66'; Bustamante 70'	Stadium: Estadio Municipal de Concepción; Referee: Bernardo Corujo (Venezuela)

4 December Match 107	Colombia	1–1 (6–5 or 5–4 p)	Brazil	Concepción, Chile
	Peña 25'	Report	Wallace 50'	Stadium: Estadio Municipal de Concepción; Referee: Angelo Bratsis (United States)

6 December Match 108	Argentina	2–0	Colombia	Concepción, Chile
	Marchesini 54'; J. L. Rodríguez 86'	Report		Stadium: Estadio Municipal de Concepción; Referee: Carlos Maciel (Paraguay)

==== 1987 ====
18 April Match 109	Colombia	1–0	Peru	Santa Cruz de la Sierra, Bolivia
	R. Pérez 83'	Report		Stadium: Estadio Ramón Tahuichi Aguilera; Referee: Jorge Eduardo Romero (Argentina)

20 April Match 110	Colombia	2–0	Brazil	Santa Cruz de la Sierra, Bolivia
	Galeano 60'; Tréllez 82'	Report		Stadium: Estadio Ramón Tahuichi Aguilera; Referee: Gastón Castro (Chile)

22 April Match 111	Colombia	0–0	Uruguay	Santa Cruz de la Sierra, Bolivia
		Report		Stadium: Estadio Ramón Tahuichi Aguilera; Referee: Elías Jácome (Ecuador)

24 April Match 112	Colombia	1–0	Paraguay	Santa Cruz de la Sierra, Bolivia
	A. García 76'	Report		Stadium: Estadio Ramón Tahuichi Aguilera; Referee: Gastón Castro (Chile)

29 April Match 113	Bolivia	2–1	Colombia	La Paz, Bolivia
	Salinas (??); Castillo (??)	Report	Galeano (??)	Stadium: Estadio Hernando Siles; Attendance: 48,000

1 May Match 114	Brazil	2–1	Colombia	La Paz, Bolivia
	Jorginho 61'; João Paulo 70'	Report	Maturana 47'	Stadium: Estadio Hernando Siles; Attendance: 55,000; Referee: Edgardo Codesal (Mexico)

3 May Match 115	Colombia	1–0	Argentina	La Paz, Bolivia
	Redín 17'	Report		Stadium: Estadio Hernando Siles; Attendance: 50,000

9 August Match 116	Colombia	0–0	Paraguay	Indianapolis, United States
		Report		Stadium: Kuntz Stadium; Referee: Angelo Bratsis (United States)

12 August Match 117	Guatemala	2–0	Colombia	Indianapolis, United States
	Funes 26'; Westphal 85'	Report		Stadium: Kuntz Stadium; Attendance: 12,300; Referee: Hernán Silva (Chile)

15 August Match 118	Mexico	2–1	Colombia	Indianapolis, United States
	Lira 19'; Quirarte 72' (pen.)	Report	W. Rodriguez 41'	Stadium: Kuntz Stadium; Referee: Richard Ramcharan (Trinidad and Tobago)

=== Professional era ===
==== 1992 ====
12 January Match 119	Colombia	1–1	Ecuador	Barranquilla, Colombia
	Noriega 25' (o.g.)	Report	Zambrano 57'	Stadium: Estadio Metropolitano Roberto Meléndez; Attendance: 31,826

19 January Match 120	Ecuador	2–1	Colombia	Guayaquil, Ecuador
16:00 (UTC−05:00)	Hurtado 33'; Burbano 54'	Report	Aristizabal 39'	Stadium: Estadio Modelo Alberto Spencer Herrera; Attendance: 15,000; Referee: Elías Jácome (Ecuador)

28 January Unofficial	Atlético Nacional (Colombia)	1–2	Colombia	Medellín, Colombia
	Cañas (??)	Report	Aristizábal (??); Zambrano (??)	Stadium: Estadio Atanasio Girardot

3 February Match 121	Colombia	4–1	Peru	Asunción, Paraguay
	Lozano 8'; Valenciano 15', 61'; Restrepo 83'	Report	Maestri 53'	Stadium: Estadio Defensores del Chaco; Referee: Alfredo Rodas (Ecuador)

5 February Match 122	Colombia	2–0	Brazil	Asunción, Paraguay
	Valenciano 40', 67'	Report		Stadium: Estadio Defensores del Chaco; Referee: Pablo Peña (Bolivia)

7 February Match 123	Colombia	4–0	Venezuela	Asunción, Paraguay
	Bermúdez 53'; Botero 70'; Gaviria 79'; Valenciano 90'	Report		Stadium: Estadio Defensores del Chaco; Referee: Javier Castrilli (Argentina)

9 February Match 124	Paraguay	0–0	Colombia	Asunción, Paraguay
		Report		Stadium: Estadio Defensores del Chaco; Referee: Alfredo Rodas (Ecuador)

12 February Match 125	Colombia	3–0	Uruguay	Asunción, Paraguay
	Asprilla 32', 54'; Pacheco 68'	Report		Stadium: Estadio Defensores del Chaco; Attendance: 15,000; Referee: Javier Castrilli (Argentina)

14 February Match 126	Paraguay	1–0	Colombia	Asunción, Paraguay
	Yegros 29'	Report		Stadium: Estadio Defensores del Chaco; Attendance: 35,000; Referee: Renato Marsiglia (Brazil)

16 February Match 127	Colombia	1–1	Ecuador	Asunción, Paraguay
	Aristizábal 51'	Report	Chalá 53'	Stadium: Estadio Defensores del Chaco; Attendance: 40,000; Referee: Javier Castrilli (Argentina)

28 June Match 128	Colombia	2–0	Paraguay	Barranquilla, Colombia
16:30 (UTC−05:00)	Aristizábal 30' (pen.); Pacheco 70'	Report		Stadium: Estadio Metropolitano Roberto Meléndez; Attendance: 20,000; Referee: Luis Marín (Colombia)

1 July Match 129	Colombia	0–0 (4–2 p)	Poland	Barranquilla, Colombia
20:30 (UTC−05:00)		Report		Stadium: Estadio Metropolitano Roberto Meléndez
	Penalties
	Valenciano (penalty scored); Asprilla (penalty scored); Restrepo (penalty scored); Osorio (penalty scored)		Penalty scored Penalty missed

5 July Match 130	Colombia	0–0	Mexico	Querétaro, Mexico
		Report		Stadium: Estadio Corregidora; Referee: Miguel Angel Salas (Mexico)

8 July Match 131	Honduras	1–0	Colombia	Tegucigalpa, Honduras
	Bennett 45'	Report		Stadium: Estadio Tiburcio Carías Andino

24 July Match 132	Spain	4–0	Colombia	Valencia, Spain
21:00 (CET)	Guardiola 10'; Kiko 37'; Berges 41'; Luis Enrique 69'	Report		Stadium: Estadio Luis Casanova; Attendance: 18,000; Referee: Markus Merk (Germany)

27 July Match 133	Colombia	1–1	Qatar	Sabadell, Spain
19:00 (CET)	Aristizábal 62'	Report	Soufi 89'	Stadium: Estadio Nova Creu Alta; Attendance: 2,000; Referee: Arturo Brizio Carter (Mexico)

29 July Match 134	Colombia	3–4	Egypt	Sabadell, Spain
19:00 (CET)	Gaviria 9', 84'; Pacheco 14'	Report	Youssef 27'; El-Masry 47'; Khashaba 91', 94'	Stadium: Estadio Nova Creu Alta; Attendance: 4,500; Referee: Ali Bujsaim (United Arab Emirates)

==== 1994 ====
26 January Match 135	Ecuador	4–2	Colombia	Quito, Ecuador
	Echeverría 5'; Jiménez 20'; W. Carabalí (??); W. Sánchez 71'	Report	Mackenzie 54'; Zambrano 87'

30 January Match 136	Ecuador	0–1	Colombia	Ibarra, Ecuador
		Report		Stadium: Estadio Olímpico de Ibarra; Referee: Milton Villavicencio (Ecuador)

6 February Match 137	Colombia	3–0	Trinidad and Tobago	Bogotá, Colombia
	Zambrano 48'; Mafla (??); Lozano 74'	Report		Stadium: Estadio Metropolitano de Techo

9 February Match 138	Colombia	4–0	Antioquia	Bogotá, Colombia
	Zambrano (??); Moreno (??); Oviedo (??)	Report		Stadium: Estadio El Campín

13 February Match 139	Colombia	3–1	Ecuador	Bogotá, Colombia
	Zambrano 52'; Oviedo (??); Mafla (??)	Report	M. González (??)	Stadium: Estadio Metropolitano de Techo

20 February Match 140	Colombia	3–2	Uruguay	Bogotá, Colombia
	Dinas (??); Mafla (??); Moreno (??)		Delgado (??); Correa (??)	Stadium: Estadio Metropolitano de Techo

==== 1995 ====
10 March Match 141	Colombia	2–0	Trinidad and Tobago	Necochea, Argentina
	Ricard (??); Dinas (??)	Report		Stadium: Estadio Rivadavia Necochea; Referee: Juan José Bernabé (Argentina)

13 March Match 142	Colombia	5–0	Ecuador	Necochea, Argentina
	Zambrano (??); Ricard (??); Mckenzie (??); Ayoví (??); Quiñonez (??)	Report		Stadium: Estadio Rivadavia Necochea; Referee: Néstor Mondría (Chile)

15 March Match 143	Mexico	3–0	Colombia	Necochea, Argentina
	Nápoles (??); L. Hernández (??); Blanco (??)	Report		Stadium: Estadio Rivadavia Necochea; Referee: Carlos Pimentel (Brazil)

?? March Match 144	Colombia	2–0	Paraguay	Mar del Plata, Argentina
				Stadium: Estadio José María Minella

22 March Match 145	Mexico	2–1	Colombia	Mar del Plata, Argentina
	Salvador 78' (??)	Report	Ricard 35'	Stadium: Estadio José María Minella; Attendance: 5,000; Referee: Ronald Gutiérrez (Costa Rica)

24 March Match 146	Colombia	3–0	Honduras	Mar del Plata, Argentina
	Zapata (??); Quiñonez (??); Zambrano (??)	Report		Stadium: Estadio José María Minella; Attendance: 40,000; Referee: Juan José Bernabé (Argentina)

==== 1996 ====
31 January Match 147	Colombia	0–1	Italy	Miami, United States
		Report	Buchi 77'	Stadium: Miami Orange Bowl

4 February Match 148	Honduras	1–1	Colombia	Tegucigalpa, Honduras
	Carson (??)	Report	Ángel 80' (pen.)	Stadium: Estadio Nacional; Attendance: 8,000

7 February Match 149	Colombia	3–0	El Salvador	San Salvador, El Salvador
	R. Pérez (??); Ricard (??)	Report		Stadium: Estadio Cuscatlán

13 February Unofficial	Colombia	1–2	(Colombia) Santa Fe	Bogotá, Colombia
	Castillo (??)	Report	W. Gutiérrez (??); Preciado (??)	Stadium: Estadio El Campín

18 February Match 150	Venezuela	1–0	Colombia	Mar del Plata, Argentina
	Valiente (??)	Report		Stadium: Estadio José María Minella; Referee: Pablo Peña (Bolivia)

20 February Match 151	Colombia	3–3	Ecuador	Mar del Plata, Argentina
	Dinas 11'; Mackenzie 44', 72' (pen.)	Report	Delgado 22'; Hurtado 43'; Escobar 90'	Stadium: Estadio José María Minella; Referee: José Da Rosa (Uruguay)

24 February Match 152	Chile	3–3	Colombia	Mar del Plata, Argentina
	Ávila (??); Rojas (??); Salas (??)	Report	J. González (??); Mackenzie (??); Ángel (??)	Stadium: Estadio José María Minella; Referee: José Arana (Peru)

26 February Match 153	Argentina	4–0	Colombia	Mar del Plata, Argentina
	Crespo (??); K. González (??)	Report		Stadium: Estadio José María Minella; Referee: Antônio Pereira (Brazil)

==== 1999 ====
18 December Match 154	Colombia	4–3	Paraguay	Armenia, Colombia
	Candelo 17' (pen.), 34'; Córdoba 82'; J. Díaz 90'	Report	Cuevas 10'; C. Ramírez 23'; Morel 33'	Stadium: Estadio Centenario; Attendance: 10,000; Referee: Fernando Panesso (Colombia)

21 December Match 155	Colombia	2–1	Paraguay	Pereira, Colombia
	Candelo 47'; J. Díaz 82'	Report	C. Ramírez 90' (pen.)	Stadium: Estadio Hernán Ramírez Villegas; Attendance: 10,000; Referee: Jorge Hoyos (Colombia)

==== 2000 ====
19 January Match 156	Colombia	4–2	Ecuador	Londrina, Brazil
	Viveros 6'; Candelo 33' (pen.), 45' (pen.); Castillo 47'	Report	Candelario 24'; Kaviedes 38'	Stadium: Estádio do Café; Attendance: 50,000; Referee: Daniel Giménez (Argentina)

21 January Match 157	Colombia	1–1	Venezuela	Londrina, Brazil
	Castillo 28'	Report	Vielma 82'	Stadium: Estádio do Café; Attendance: 1,000; Referee: Saúl Feldman (Uruguay)

26 January Match 158	Colombia	5–1	Chile	Londrina, Brazil
	Muñoz 16', 30', 54'; Quintana 59'; Candelo 60'	Report	J. Gutiérrez 87'	Stadium: Estádio do Café; Attendance: 10,000; Referee: Carlos Amarilla (Paraguay)

30 January Match 159	Brazil	9–0	Colombia	Londrina, Brazil
	Álvaro 8'; Ronaldinho 16', 90' (pen.); Edú 22', 37'; Athirson 44'; Adriano 65'; Lucas 72'; Warley 82'	Report		Stadium: Estádio do Café; Attendance: 25,000; Referee: Daniel Giménez (Argentina)

9 March Match 160	Chile	2–0	Colombia	Santiago, Chile

==== 2003 ====
17 April Match 161	Mexico	0–1	Colombia	Querétaro, Mexico
		Report	Muñoz 80'

30 April Match 162	Panama	2–2	Colombia	Panama City, Panama

21 July Match 163	Chile	0–1	Colombia	Santiago, Chile

4 November Match 164	Colombia	1–1	Ecuador	Pereira, Colombia
	Herrera (??)	Report	Checa (??)	Stadium: Estadio Hernán Ramírez Villegas

6 November Match 165	Colombia	0–0	Venezuela	Pereira, Colombia
				Stadium: Estadio Hernán Ramírez Villegas

8 November Match 166	Colombia	0–0	Chile	Pereira, Colombia
				Stadium: Estadio Hernán Ramírez Villegas

==== 2004 ====
8 January Match 167	Colombia	0–1	Ecuador	Coquimbo, Chile
		Report	Mina 14'	Stadium: Estadio Francisco Sánchez Rumoroso; Attendance: 5,000; Referee: Paulo César Oliveira (Brazil)

10 January Match 168	Colombia	3–1	Peru	Coquimbo, Chile
	Herrera 46+' (pen.); 57'; 86'	Report	Guerrero 34'	Stadium: Estadio Francisco Sánchez Rumoroso; Attendance: 3,500; Referee: Gustavo Méndez (Uruguay)

12 January Match 169	Colombia	2–0	Bolivia	Coquimbo, Chile
	Herrera 28'; Arzuaga 90'	Report		Stadium: Estadio Francisco Sánchez Rumoroso; Attendance: 2,000; Referee: Pablo Pozo (Chile)

16 January Match 170	Argentina	4–2	Colombia	La Serena, Chile
	Mosquera 14' (o.g.); Lucho González 30'; Gonzalo Rodríguez 38'; Ferreyra 66'	Report	Domínguez 21'; Herrera 70'	Stadium: Estadio La Portada; Attendance: 2,500; Referee: Carlos Amarilia (Paraguay)

18 January Match 171	Brazil	3–0	Colombia	Valparaíso, Chile
	Alex 11'; Marcel 46'; Dudu 81'	Report		Stadium: Estadio Playa Ancha; Attendance: 1,000; Referee: Gustavo Méndez (Uruguay)

==== 2015 ====
11 November Match 172	China	0–1	Colombia	Wuhan, China
		Report	R. Martínez 31'	Stadium: Xinhua Road Sports Center

13 November Match 173	South Korea	2–2	Colombia	Wuhan, China
	(??)	Report	J. Nieto 68'; R. Martínez 81'	Stadium: Xinhua Road Sports Center

15 November Match 174	Morocco	0–1	Colombia	Wuhan, China
		Report	R. Martínez 34'	Stadium: Xinhua Road Sports Center

==== 2016 ====
24 February Match 175	Honduras	1–1	Colombia	Ft. Lauderdale, United States
	Chirinos (??)	Report	A. Murillo 31'	Stadium: Lockhart Stadium

27 February Match 176	Honduras	2–2	Colombia	Ft. Lauderdale, United States
	Elis 56'; Acosta 80' (pen.)	Report	Mina 34'; Quintero 38'	Stadium: Lockhart Stadium

25 March Match 177	Colombia	1–1	United States	Barranquilla, Colombia
16:05 UTC−5	Quintero 67' (pen.)	Report	Gil 5'	Stadium: Estadio Metropolitano Roberto Meléndez; Referee: Cüneyt Çakır (Turkey)

29 March Match 178	United States	1–2	Colombia	Texas, United States
	Machado 57' (o.g.)	Report	R. Martínez 30', 64'	Stadium: Toyota Stadium (Texas); Referee: Ravshan Irmatov (Uzbekistan)

21 July Match 179	Argentina	0–0	Colombia	Boca Ratón, Florida, United States
		Report		Stadium: FAU Stadium

24 July Match 180	Colombia	2–0	Honduras	Cartagena, Colombia
17:00	Preciado 33'; Gutiérrez 85'	Report		Stadium: Estadio Jaime Morón León; Referee: Wilmar Roldán (Colombia)

4 August Match 181	Sweden	2–2	Colombia	Manaus, Brazil
18:00	Ishak 43'; Ajdarević 62'	Report (Rio2016); Report (FIFA)	Gutiérrez 17'; Pabón 75' (pen.)	Stadium: Arena da Amazônia; Attendance: 29,996; Referee: Fahad Al-Mirdasi (Saudi Arabia)

7 August Match 182	Japan	2–2	Colombia	Manaus, Brazil
21:00	Asano 67'; Nakajima 74'	Report (Rio2016); Report (FIFA)	Gutiérrez 59'; Fujiharu 65' (o.g.)	Stadium: Arena da Amazônia; Attendance: 26,603; Referee: Sergei Karasev (Russia)

10 August Match 183	Colombia	2–0	Nigeria	São Paulo, Brazil
19:00	Gutiérrez 4'; Pabón 63' (pen.)	Report (Rio2016); Report (FIFA)		Stadium: Arena Corinthians; Attendance: 36,702; Referee: César Arturo Ramos (Mexico)

13 August Match 184	Brazil	2–0	Colombia	São Paulo, Brazil
22:00	Neymar 12'; Luan 83'	Report (Rio2016); Report (FIFA)		Stadium: Arena Corinthians; Attendance: 41,560; Referee: Cüneyt Çakır (Turkey)

==== 2019 ====
5 September Match 185	Brazil	2–0	Colombia	São Paulo, Brazil
21:30	Pedrinho 15'; Matheus Cunha 42'	Report		Stadium: Pacaembú

8 September Match 186	Argentina	3–1	Colombia	Buenos Aires, Argentina
17:00	González 34'; Vargas 38' (pen.); Carranza 82'	Report	Mesa 23'	Stadium: Diego Armando Maradona

10 October Match 187	Peru	0–3	Colombia	Callao, Perú
15:00		Report	Sandoval 23'; Ramírez 27'; Vera 72'	Stadium: Estadio Miguel Grau

13 October Match 188	Peru	1–0	Colombia	Callao, Perú
				Stadium: Estadio Miguel Grau

17 November Match 189	Japan	0–2	Colombia	Hiroshima, Japan
16:30		Report	Sandoval 47'; Ramírez 58'

19 December Match 190	Paraguay	3–1	Colombia	Asunción, Paraguay

21 December Match 191	Paraguay	2–2	Colombia	Asunción, Paraguay

12 January Match 192	Colombia	0–1	Bolivia	Barranquilla, Colombia

==== 2020 ====
18 January Match 193	Colombia	1–2	Argentina	Pereira, Colombia
20:30	Carrascal 7'	Report	Mac Allister 11'; Gaich 51'	Stadium: Estadio Hernán Ramírez Villegas; Referee: Esteban Ostojich (Uruguay)

21 January Match 194	Colombia	4–0	Ecuador	Pereira, Colombia
20:30	Benedetti 15'; Carrascal 26'; Cetré 32'; Carbonero 87'	Report		Stadium: Estadio Hernán Ramírez Villegas; Referee: Eber Aquino (Paraguay)

27 January Match 195	Colombia	2–1	Venezuela	Pereira, Colombia
20:30	Carrascal 45+2'; Atuesta 71'	Report	Hurtado 45+1'	Stadium: Estadio Hernán Ramírez Villegas; Referee: Kevin Ortega (Peru)

30 January Match 196	Colombia	0–0	Chile	Pereira, Colombia
20:30		Report		Stadium: Estadio Hernán Ramírez Villegas; Referee: Eber Aquino (Paraguay)

3 February Match 197	Colombia	1–1	Brazil	Bucaramanga, Colombia
20:30	Cunha 71'	Report	Cetré 27'	Stadium: Estadio Alfonso López; Referee: Ángel Arteaga (Venezuela)

6 February Match 198	Argentina	2–1	Colombia	Bucaramanga, Colombia
20:30	Urzi 50'; Pérez 53'	Report	Cetré 67' (pen.)	Stadium: Estadio Alfonso López; Referee: Piero Maza (Chile)

9 February Match 199	Colombia	1–3	Uruguay	Bucaramanga, Colombia
18:00	Cetré 78'	Report	Ramírez 28'; Sanabria 53'; J. Rodríguez 61'	Stadium: Estadio Alfonso López; Referee: Guillermo Guerrero (Ecuador)

==== 2023 ====
17 October Match 200	Costa Rica	3–2	Colombia	Cartago, Costa Rica
18:00	Madrigal 13'; Vargas 58'; Evans 73'	Report	Mosquera 15'; Cortés 31'	Stadium: Estadio José Rafael Fello Meza Ivankovich

23 October Match 201	Colombia	2–0	Honduras	Estadio Sausalito, Viña del Mar
13:00	Ruiz 16'; Cortés 41'	Report		Referee: Fernando Véjar Diaz (Chile)

26 October Match 202	Brazil	2–0	Colombia	Estadio Sausalito, Viña del Mar
20:00	Biro 16'; Pirani 51'	Report		Referee: José Burgos (Uruguay)

29 October Match 203	Colombia	0–2	United States	Estadio Elías Figueroa Brander, Valparaíso
18:00		Report	Ikoba 63'; Neri 76'	Referee: Fernando Véjar Diaz (Chile)

1 November Match 204	Uruguay	0–0 (4–3 p)	Colombia	Estadio Elías Figueroa Brander, Valparaíso
12:00		Report		Referee: Manuel Vergara (Chile)
	Penalties
	O'Neill (penalty scored); Nandín (penalty scored); Cruz de los Santos (penalty scored); Lavega (penalty scored); Piñeiro (penalty missed)		(penalty scored) Palacios; (penalty scored) Castilla; (penalty scored) Rojas; (penalty missed) Mosquera; (penalty missed) Ruiz

9 December Match 205	Colombia	1–1	Peru	Estadio Jaime Morón León, Cartagena
	Calderón 45+2'	Report	Guzmán 87'

12 December Match 206	Colombia	3–1	Peru	Romelio Martínez Stadium, Barranquilla
	Calderón 4'; Palacios 30'; Castilla 41'	Report	Wisdom 64'

==== 2024 ====
12 January Match 207	Colombia	5–0	Dominican Republic	Romelio Martínez Stadium, Barranquilla
	Ruiz 22'; Tanton 47'; Cortés 55', 73'; Perea 83'	Report

20 January Match 208	Ecuador	3–0	Colombia	Estadio Brígido Iriarte, Caracas
	Medina 71', 88'; Zambrano 86'	Report		Referee: Yael Falcón Pérez (Argentina)

26 January Match 209	Brazil	2–0	Colombia	Estadio Brígido Iriarte, Caracas
	Endrick 25'; John Kennedy 83'	Report		Referee: Cristian Garay (Chile)

29 January Match 210	Colombia	0–1	Venezuela	Estadio Brígido Iriarte, Caracas
		Report	Bolívar 34'	Referee: Roberto Pérez (Peru)

1 February Match 211	Colombia	0–2	Bolivia	Estadio Misael Delgado, Valencia
		Report	Briceño 9', 29'	Referee: Derlis López (Paraguay)

==== 2026 ====
30 July Match 212	Panama	0–1	Colombia	Moca, Dominican Republic
14:00		Report	K. González 82'	Stadium: Estadio Complejo Deportivo Moca 86; Referee: Melvin Matamoros (Honduras)

1 August Match 213	Colombia	1–0	Cuba	Santiago de los Caballeros, Dominican Republic
18:00	Marulanda 70'	Report		Stadium: Estadio Cibao FC; Referee: Akil Weekes (Trinidad and Tobago)

3 August Match 214	Costa Rica	1–1	Colombia	Santiago de los Caballeros, Dominican Republic
16:00	Salazar 10'	Report	Marulanda 8'	Stadium: Estadio Cibao FC; Referee: Jordan Chaibrant (Guadeloupe)

5 August Match 215	Colombia	0–1	Venezuela	Moca, Dominican Republic
19:00		Report	Hernández 82'	Stadium: Estadio Complejo Deportivo Moca 86; Referee: Roger Vindas (Costa Rica)

7 August Match 216	Panama	1–1 (a.e.t.) (3–2 p)	Colombia	Santiago de los Caballeros, Dominican Republic
15:00	Ryce 51'	Report	Arango 70'	Stadium: Estadio Cibao FC; Referee: Juan Manuel Morales (Guatemala)
	Penalties
	Ryce (penalty scored); Pérez (penalty scored); Quintero (penalty missed); Bernal (penalty missed); Díaz (penalty scored)		(penalty missed) Marulanda; (penalty missed) Socarras; (penalty missed) Chinchia; (penalty scored) Palacios; (penalty scored) Arrechea
