= 1971 CONMEBOL Pre-Olympic Tournament =

Tournament details
- Host country: Colombia
- Teams: 10

Final positions
- Champions: Brazil
- Runners-up: Colombia
- Third place: Argentina
- Fourth place: Peru

The 1971 CONMEBOL Pre-Olympic Tournament was the 4th CONMEBOL Pre-Olympic Tournament.

Brazil and Colombia qualified for the 1972 Summer Olympics.

== Group stage ==
=== Group 1 ===
Pos	Team	Pld	W	D	L	GF	GA	GD	Pts	Qualification
1	Brazil	4	2	2	0	4	2	+2	6	Final round
2	Argentina	4	1	3	0	5	3	+2	5	Final round
3	Bolivia	4	1	2	1	5	5	0	4	
4	Ecuador	4	0	3	1	4	5	−1	3	
5	Chile	4	0	2	2	1	4	−3	2	

26 November 1971

Bolivia	1–1	Chile
Morales 43'		Antequera 60'

Pascual Guerrero, Cali
Referee: Ramón Barreto (Uruguay)
26 November 1971

Brazil	1–1	Ecuador
Dias 39'		Vágner 60' (o.g.)

Pascual Guerrero, Cali
Referee: Guillermo Velásquez (Colombia)

28 November 1971

Argentina	2–2	Ecuador
Di Meola 8'; Ungaretti 83'		Vizuete 17'; Estupiñán 48'

Pascual Guerrero, Cali
Referee: Hugo Sosa (Paraguay)
28 November 1971

Brazil	2–1	Bolivia
Roberto Carlos 36'; Dias 38'		Landa 78'

Pascual Guerrero, Cali
Referee: José Varrone (Venezuela)

30 November 1971

Brazil	0–0	Argentina

Pascual Guerrero, Cali
Referee: Ramón Barreto (Uruguay)
30 November 1971

Ecuador	0–0	Chile

Pascual Guerrero, Cali
Referee: Hugo Sosa (Paraguay)

2 December 1971

Argentina	2–0	Chile
Jorge 22' (pen.); Di Meola 67'

Pascual Guerrero, Cali
Referee: Edison Pérez Núñez (Peru)
2 December 1971

Bolivia	2–1	Ecuador
Landa 11'; Zapata 17'		Vaca 89'

Pascual Guerrero, Cali
Referee: José Varrone (Venezuela)

5 December 1971

Argentina	1–1	Bolivia
Di Meola 5'		Jiménez 24'

Estadio Atanasio Girardot, Medellín
Referee: Guillermo Velásquez (Colombia)
5 December 1971

Brazil	1–0	Chile
Dias 65'

Estadio Atanasio Girardot, Medellín
Referee: Edison Pérez Núñez (Peru)

=== Group 2 ===
Pos	Team	Pld	W	D	L	GF	GA	GD	Pts	Qualification
1	Peru	4	3	1	0	7	2	+5	7	Final round
2	Colombia	4	2	2	0	5	2	+3	6	Final round
3	Paraguay	4	1	2	1	6	4	+2	4	
4	Uruguay	4	1	1	2	4	4	0	3	
5	Venezuela	4	0	0	4	1	11	−10	0	

26 November 1971

Colombia	2–1	Uruguay
Morón 3'; Andrade 48'		Moncada 85' (o.g.)

El Campín, Bogotá
Referee: Luis Pestarino (Argentina)
26 November 1971

Peru	3–0	Venezuela
Barbadillo 72', 74'; Palacios 75'

El Campín, Bogotá
Referee: Oscar Ortubé (Bolivia)

28 November 1971

Peru	2–1	Paraguay
Peralta 8'; Ruiz 29'		Fleitas 5'

El Campín, Bogotá
Referee: Luis Pestarino (Argentina)
28 November 1971

Colombia	2–0	Venezuela
Andrade 44', 85'

El Campín, Bogotá
Referee: Juan Silvagno Cavanna (Chile)

1 December 1971

Paraguay	1–1	Uruguay
Aquino 77'		Mayero 3'

El Campín, Bogotá
Referee: Juan Silvagno Cavanna (Chile)
1 December 1971

Peru	1–1	Colombia
Larios 34'		Andrade 40'

El Campín, Bogotá
Attendance: 55,000
Referee: Luis Pestarino (Argentina)

3 December 1971

Peru	1–0	Uruguay
Daga 5'

El Campín, Bogotá
Referee: Romualdo Arppi Filho (Brazil)
3 December 1971

Paraguay	4–1	Venezuela
González 20', 60'; Torres 65', 73'		Araque 38'

El Campín, Bogotá
Referee: Eduardo Rendón (Ecuador)

5 December 1971

Colombia	0–0	Paraguay

El Campín, Bogotá
Referee: Romualdo Arppi Filho (Brazil)
5 December 1971

Uruguay	2–0	Venezuela
Napolotti 21'; Chávez 35'

El Campín, Bogotá
Referee: Eduardo Rendón (Ecuador)

== Final round ==
Pos	Team	Pld	W	D	L	GF	GA	GD	Pts	Qualification
1	Brazil	3	2	1	0	3	1	+2	5	1972 Summer Olympics
2	Colombia	3	0	3	0	2	2	0	3	1972 Summer Olympics
3	Argentina	3	0	2	1	2	3	−1	2	
4	Peru	3	0	2	1	1	2	−1	2	

7 December 1971

Brazil	1–1	Colombia
Enéas 87'		Santamaría 10'

Estadio El Campín, Bogotá
Referee: Oscar Ortubé (Bolivia)
7 December 1971

Argentina	1–1	Peru
Moreno 79'		Peralta 28'

Estadio El Campín, Bogotá
Referee: Ramón Barreto (Uruguay)

9 December 1971

Brazil	1–0	Argentina
Zico 33'

Estadio El Campín, Bogotá
Referee: Hugo Sosa (Paraguay)
9 December 1971

Colombia	0–0	Peru

Estadio El Campín, Bogotá
Attendance: 40,000
Referee: Eduardo Rendón (Ecuador)

11 December 1971

Colombia	1–1	Argentina
Andrade 84'		Rodríguez 50' (o.g.)

Estadio El Campín, Bogotá
Referee: Ramón Barreto (Uruguay)
11 December 1971

Brazil	1–0	Peru
Enéas 58'

Estadio El Campín, Bogotá
Referee: Juan Silvagno Cavanna (Chile)

== Goalscorers ==
There were 50 goals scored in 26 matches, for an average of 1.92 goals per match.

6 goals

- (Colombia) Adolfo Andrade

3 goals

- (Argentina) Edgardo Di Meola
- (Brazil) Nílson Dias

2 goals

- (Brazil) Enéas
- (Bolivia) Arturo Saucedo Landa
- (Paraguay) Pedro González
- (Paraguay) Miguel Ángel Torres
- (Peru) Gerónimo Barbadillo
- (Peru) César Peralta

1 goal

- (Argentina) Alberto Jorge
- (Argentina) Rafael Domingo Moreno
- (Argentina) Jesús Ángel Ungaretti
- (Bolivia) Porfirio Jiménez
- (Bolivia) Raúl Alberto Morales
- (Bolivia) Roberto Zapata
- (Brazil) Roberto Carlos
- (Brazil) Zico
- (Chile) Manuel Antequera
- (Colombia) Jaime Morón
- (Colombia) Álvaro Santamaría
- (Ecuador) Ítalo Estupiñán
- (Ecuador) Hernán Vaca
- (Ecuador) Jorge Vizuete
- (Paraguay) Osvaldo Aquino
- (Paraguay) Mario Fleitas
- (Peru) Wálter Daga
- (Peru) Alfredo Larios
- (Peru) Moisés Palacios
- (Uruguay) Luis Chávez
- (Uruguay) Carlos Mayero
- (Uruguay) Mario Napolotti
- (Venezuela) José Araque

1 own goal

- (Brazil) Vágner (against Ecuador)
- (Colombia) Gerardo Moncada
- (Colombia) Jaime Rodríguez Suárez (against Argentina)
