= Football at the 1971 Pan American Games =

Football – Men's tournament at the 1971 Pan American Games
- Venue: Estadio Olímpico Pascual Guerrero
- Dates: 31 July – 12 August

Medalists
Gold medal	Argentina
Silver medal	Colombia
Bronze medal	Cuba

The sixth edition of the football tournament at the Pan American Games was held in five cities in Colombia: Cali (main city of the Games) Cartago, Buga, Palmira and Tuluá, from 31 July to 12 August 1971. Twelve teams divided in three groups of four did compete in a round-robin competition, with Mexico defending the title. After the preliminary round there was a final round.

== Participants ==
- Argentina
- Bahamas
- Bermuda
- Canada
- Colombia
- Cuba
- Dominican Republic
- Haiti
- Jamaica
- Mexico
- Trinidad and Tobago
- United States

== Preliminary round ==
=== Group A (Cali) ===
Team	Pts	Pld	W	D	L	GF	GA	GD
Colombia	6	3	3	0	0	12	1	+11
Canada	4	3	2	0	1	10	2	+8
Bahamas	2	3	1	0	2	4	13	−9
Dominican Republic	0	3	0	0	3	2	12	−10

Colombia	2–1	Canada
Bahamas	4–2	Dominican Republic
Colombia	6–0	Bahamas
Canada	4–0	Dominican Republic
Colombia	4–0	Dominican Republic
Canada	5–0	Bahamas

=== Group B (Cartago) ===
Team	Pts	Pld	W	D	L	GF	GA	GD
Cuba	5	3	2	1	0	3	0	+3
Trinidad and Tobago	3	3	1	1	1	3	2	+1
Mexico	3	3	1	1	1	3	3	0
Jamaica	1	3	0	1	2	0	4	−4

Cuba	2–0	Mexico
Jamaica	0–2	Trinidad & Tobago
Cuba	0–0	Jamaica
Mexico	1–1	Trinidad & Tobago
Cuba	1–0	Trinidad & Tobago
Mexico	2–0	Jamaica

=== Group C (Buga and Tuluá) ===
Team	Pts	Pld	W	D	L	GF	GA	GD
Argentina	5	3	2	1	0	6	2	+4
United States	4	3	2	0	1	7	6	+1
Haiti	2	3	0	2	1	4	5	−1
Bermuda	1	3	0	1	2	3	7	−4

Argentina	3–0	United States
Haiti	1–1	Bermuda
Argentina	1–1	Haiti
United States	4–1	Bermuda
Argentina	2–1	Bermuda
United States	3–2	Haiti

== Final Round ==
=== Positions ===
Team	Pts	Pld	W	D	L	GF	GA	GD
Argentina	9	5	4	1	0	7	2	+5
Colombia	6	5	2	2	1	9	6	+3
Cuba	6	5	3	0	2	5	3	+2
Trinidad and Tobago	5	5	2	1	2	10	7	+3
Canada	3	5	1	1	3	4	7	−3
United States	1	5	0	1	4	2	12	−10

=== Matches ===
7 August

Cuba	1–0	Trinidad and Tobago

?, Palmira

7 August

Argentina	2–0	Canada

?, Buga

7 August

Colombia	3–0	United States

8 August

Argentina	3–2	Trinidad and Tobago

?, Palmira

8 August

Cuba	2–0	United States

8 August

Canada	3–2	Colombia

9 August

Colombia	2–2	Trinidad and Tobago

?, Palmira

9 August

Canada	1–1	United States

9 August

Argentina	1–0	Cuba

11 August

Canada	0–1	Trinidad and Tobago

11 August

Argentina	1–0	United States

11 August

Colombia	2–1	Cuba

12 August

Canada	0–1	Cuba

?, Palmira

12 August

United States	1–5	Trinidad and Tobago

12 August

Colombia	0–0	Argentina

== Medalists ==
Event	Gold	Silver	Bronze
Men's tournament	Argentina Hugo Abdala; Osvaldo Batocletti; José Berta; Horacio Bongiovanni; Roberto Cabral; Edgardo di Meola; Alberto Jorge; Francisco Lavorato; Miguel Ángel Leyes; Ángel Mendoza; Carlos Montenegro; Raúl Nogués; Luis Oruezábal; Osvaldo Potente; Andrés Rebottaro; Alberto Romero; Héctor Scotta; Alejandro Simion; Roberto Telch; Osvaldo Vallone; Enrique Vidallé; Abel Vieitez (HC – Rubén Bravo)	Colombia Armando Neiva; Hernando García; Francisco Maturana; José Álvaro Calle; Héctor Escobar; José Zárate; Ángel Maria Torres; Jaime Morón; Andrés Pérez; Nelson Torres; Byron Hernández; Orlando Rico; Gerardo Franco Carbonell; Edgar Díaz; Francisco González; Carlos Monsalve; Leopoldo Rivas; Miguel Quintero; Juan Quintero; Héctor Céspedes (HC – (Paraguay) César López Fretes)	Cuba José Francisco Reinoso; William Barracks; Lorenzo Sotomayor; Luis Holmaza Odelín; Miguel Rivero; Rene Bonora; Antonio Seguras; Gabriel Valenzuela; Carlos Henry Bracha; Andrés Roldán; Luis Heres Hernández; Orestes Pérez Hernández; Francisco Fariñas; Jorge Massó; José Luis Elejalde; José Verdecia; Francisco Piedra; Carlos Arcuy (HC – (North Korea) Kim Yong-ha)

== Goalscorers ==
There were 83 goals scored in 28 matches, for an average of 2.96 goals per match.

5 goals

- (Canada) Buzz Parsons
- (Colombia) Juan Quintero
- (Colombia) Carlos Monsalve

4 goals

- (Colombia) Héctor Céspedes
- (Colombia) Jaime Morón

3 goals

- (Argentina) Edgardo Di Meola
- (Argentina) Osvaldo Potente
- (Canada) John Schepers
- (Trinidad and Tobago) Ken Murren

2 goals

- (Argentina) José Orlando Berta
- (Argentina) Raúl Nogués
- (Canada) Willian Young
- (Canada) Sergio Zanatta
- (Colombia) Leopoldo Rivas
- (Colombia) Ángel Maria Torres
- (Cuba) Francisco Fariñas
- (Cuba) Luis Heres Hernández
- (Cuba) Jorge Massó
- (Trinidad and Tobago) Wilfred Cave

1 goal

- (Argentina) Roberto Cabral
- (Argentina) Luis Oruezábal
- (Argentina) Héctor Scotta
- (Bermuda) Frederick Lewis
- (Canada) Lenard Brown
- (Canada) Juan Monje
- (Colombia) Francisco González
- (Colombia) Byron Hernández
- (Cuba) José Verdecia
- (Dominican Republic) Manuel Delgado
- (Haiti) Emmanuel Sannon
- (Mexico) Marcelino Gutiérrez
- (Mexico) Manuel Manzo
- (Mexico) Tomás Torres
- (Trinidad and Tobago) David Armin
- (Trinidad and Tobago) Selwyn Murren
- (United States) John Carenza

Source: RSSSF

== Awards ==
1971 Pan American Games winners

Argentina
Fourth title
