= 1992 CONMEBOL Pre-Olympic Tournament =

Tournament details
- Host country: Paraguay
- Dates: 31 January – 16 February
- Teams: 10
- Venue: 1 (in 1 host city)

Final positions
- Champions: Paraguay (1st title)
- Runners-up: Colombia
- Third place: Uruguay
- Fourth place: Ecuador

Tournament statistics
- Matches played: 26
- Goals scored: 62 (2.38 per match)
- Top scorer: Iván Valenciano (5 goals)

The 1992 CONMEBOL Pre-Olympic Tournament began on 31 January 1992, and is the 9th CONMEBOL Pre-Olympic Tournament. This was the 1st tournament open to players under the age of 23 without any other restriction. There is no qualification stage and all 10 member of CONMEBOL automatic qualified. The winner and the runner-up qualified for 1992 Summer Olympics. Players born on or after 1 January 1969 were eligible to play in this competition.

== Group stage ==
=== Group A ===
Pos	Team	Pld	W	D	L	GF	GA	GD	Pts	Qualification
1	Colombia (Q)	4	3	1	0	10	1	+9	7	Final round
2	Paraguay (Q)	4	2	1	1	8	2	+6	5	Final round
3	Brazil	4	2	1	1	4	4	0	5	
4	Peru	4	1	0	3	6	13	−7	2	
5	Venezuela	4	0	1	3	1	9	−8	1	

(Q) Qualified for the phase indicated
31 January 1992

Paraguay	1–0	Venezuela
Carlos Gamarra 89' (pen.)

Estadio Defensores del Chaco, Asunción
Referee: (Uruguay) Jorge Nieves
1 February 1992

Brazil	2–1	Peru
Élber 52', 63'		Pablo Zegarra 80'

Estadio Defensores del Chaco, Asunción
Referee: (Argentina) Javier Castrilli
3 February 1992

Brazil	1–0	Paraguay
Márcio Santos 7'

Estadio Defensores del Chaco, Asunción
Referee: (Argentina) Francisco Lamolina
3 February 1992

Colombia	4–1	Peru
John Lozano 8'; Iván Valenciano 15', 61'; Gustavo Restrepo 83'		Flavio Maestri 53'

Estadio Defensores del Chaco, Asunción
Referee: (Ecuador) Alfredo Rodas
5 February 1992

Peru	3–0	Venezuela
Pablo Zegarra 15', 18' (pen.); Flavio Maestri 20'	Report

Estadio Defensores del Chaco, Asunción
Referee: (Uruguay) Eduardo Dluzniewski
5 February 1992

Colombia	2–0	Brazil
Ivan Valenciano 40', 67' (pen.)

Estadio Defensores del Chaco, Asunción
Referee: (Bolivia) Pedro Peña
7 February 1992

Paraguay	7–1	Peru
Carlos Gamarra 48' (pen.), 55' (pen.); Gustavo Neffa 70', 82'; José Cardozo 75', 83'; Andres Duarte 86'	Report	Carlos Basombrio 61'

Estadio Defensores del Chaco, Asunción
Referee: (Chile) Carlos Manuel Robles
7 February 1992

Colombia	4–0	Venezuela
Jorge Bermúdez 53'; Faustino Asprilla 70'; Hermán Gaviria 79'; Iván Valenciano 90'	Report

Estadio Defensores del Chaco, Asunción
Referee: (Argentina) Javier Castrilli
9 February 1992

Brazil	1–1	Venezuela
Elivélton 69'		Edson Rodríguez 37'

Estadio Defensores del Chaco, Asunción
Referee: (Uruguay) Jorge Nieves
9 February 1992

Paraguay	0–0	Colombia

Estadio Defensores del Chaco, Asunción
Referee: (Ecuador) Alfredo Rodas

=== Group B ===
Pos	Team	Pld	W	D	L	GF	GA	GD	Pts	Qualification
1	Ecuador (Q)	4	3	0	1	11	3	+8	6	Final round
2	Uruguay (Q)	4	3	0	1	7	3	+4	6	Final round
3	Argentina	4	2	1	1	4	3	+1	5	
4	Chile	3	0	1	2	2	7	−5	1	
5	Bolivia	3	0	0	3	1	9	−8	0	

(Q) Qualified for the phase indicated
2 February 1992

Ecuador	2–0	Uruguay

2 February 1992

Argentina	1–0	Bolivia

4 February 1992

Uruguay	1–0	Chile

4 February 1992

Argentina	1–0	Ecuador

6 February 1992

Ecuador	4–1	Bolivia

6 February 1992

Argentina	1–1	Chile

8 February 1992

Uruguay	4–0	Bolivia

8 February 1992

Ecuador	5–1	Chile

10 February 1992

Chile	Not played	Bolivia

10 February 1992

Uruguay	2–1	Argentina

== Final round ==
Pos	Team	Pld	W	D	L	GF	GA	GD	Pts	Qualification
1	Paraguay (Q)	3	2	1	0	2	0	+2	5	1992 Summer Olympics
2	Colombia (Q)	3	1	1	1	4	2	+2	3	1992 Summer Olympics
3	Uruguay	3	1	1	1	1	3	−2	3	
4	Ecuador	3	0	1	2	1	3	−2	1	

(Q) Qualified for the phase indicated
12 February 1992

Paraguay	1–0	Ecuador
Gamarra 76'

Estadio Defensores del Chaco, Asunción
Referee: (Brazil) Márcio Rezende
12 February 1992

Colombia	3–0	Uruguay
Faustino Asprilla 32', 54'; Víctor Pacheco 68'

Estadio Defensores del Chaco, Asunción
Referee: (Argentina) Javier Castrilli
14 February 1992

Paraguay	1–0	Colombia
Julio César Yegros 29'

Estadio Defensores del Chaco, Asunción
Referee: (Brazil) Renato Marsiglia
14 February 1992

Uruguay	1–0	Ecuador
Marcelo Saralegui 75'

Estadio Defensores del Chaco, Asunción
Referee: (Bolivia) Pablo Peña
16 February 1992

Paraguay	0–0	Uruguay

Estadio Defensores del Chaco, Asunción
Referee: (Venezuela) Álvaro Arboleda
16 February 1992

Colombia	1–1	Ecuador
Víctor Aristizábal 7'		Cléber Chalá 10'

Estadio Defensores del Chaco, Asunción
Referee: (Argentina) Javier Castrilli
