= Gerardo Moncada =

Gerardo Moncada may refer to:

- Gerardo Moncada (cyclist) (born 1962), Colombian road cyclist
- Gerardo Moncada (footballer) (born 1949), Colombian former footballer
