= Carlos Valenzuela (Chilean footballer) =

Chilean footballer

Personal information
- Full name: Carlos Alberto Valenzuela Costa
- Date of birth: 21 October 1948
- Place of birth: Santiago, Chile
- Date of death: 13 August 2016 (aged 67)
- Place of death: Chile
- Position: Centre-back

Youth career
- Palestino

Senior career*
Years	Team	Apps	(Gls)
1966–1972	Palestino		
1972–1974	Toluca		
1974–1975	Atlético Potosino		
1975	Santiago Morning	5	(0)
1976–1979	Palestino	42	(1)
1980–1984	Audax Italiano	112	(5)
1984–1985	Deportes La Serena	18	(1)
1986	Santiago Morning	–	(–)

Managerial career
- 1988–1989: Palestino (assistant)
- 1989: Palestino (interim)
- Iván Mayo
- 1992: Magallanes
- * Club domestic league appearances and goals

Carlos Alberto Valenzuela Costa (21 October 1948 – 13 August 2016) was a Chilean football player and manager who played as a centre-back for clubs in Chile and Mexico.

== Playing career ==
At the beginning a defensive midfielder, Valenzuela became a centre-back thanks to the coach Dante Pesce. He began his career with Palestino in his homeland.

After being honored as the best defender of the 1971 Segunda División de Chile, the next year he moved to Mexico and signed with Toluca alongside his teammate in Palestino, Nelson Torres. After his stint with Toluca, he was with Atlético Potosino before returning to Chile, coinciding with his compatriots Eduardo Peralta and Nelson Hernández

Back in Chile, he joined Santiago Morning in 1975 and rejoined Palestino in 1976, becoming the runner-up in the 1977 season. A member of Palestino until 1979, he won the 1978 league title.

Next, he spent four seasons with Audax Italiano. His last clubs were Deportes La Serena and Santiago Morning.

== Coaching career ==
Following his retirement, he developed a career as coach, leading clubs such as Iván Mayo and Magallanes and the team of BCI in the bank football league. He also served as the assistant of Eugenio Jara in Palestino and replaced him as head coach at the end of the 1989 season.

== Personal life ==
As a football player, he was nicknamed Perro (Dog) due to his aggressiveness in defense.

His son of the same name, Carlos Valenzuela Cerda, was born in Mexico in 1974 and was a Chile international at under-20 level. In addition to play in Chile for clubs such as Palestino and Ñublense, he had a stint with Mexican side América in 1999.

He died due to cancer in August 2016.
