= TSN Necochea =

TSN Necochea is an Argentine news portal covering the city of Necochea in the province of Buenos Aires. It used to operate a local channel of the same name between 1997 and 2022; since then TSN has limited its operations to its website.

== History ==
Necochea had a local cable television channel since 1984, when the idea of Canal 4 Televisión Necochea, also known as Necochea Televisora Color, came into fruition, which had a varied schedule.

In January 1997, the broadcasts of the Televisión Satelital Necochea cable company, a three-way joint between Multicanal, Mar del Plata's La Capital Cable and the Necochean newspaper Ecos Diarios, with an offer of 65 channels, the large part of them was basic, as well as relaying Canal 2 from Mar del Plata (from La Capital Cable), its own local channel and five premium channels, HBO Ole, Cinecanal, Cinemax, medical channel Señal de Vida and the adult channel Venus. For the scrambled channels a TOCOM decoder was required, which was also used for TyC's Sunday pay-per-view soccer matches (at the time El clásico del domingo, later TyC Max). The founder of both the local channel (Canal 10 TSN) and the cable company was Guillermo Inacio, three-time ADEPA president. In mid-1999, the cable.company was acquired by La Capital Cable, while the local channels (9 and 10) continued using the TSN nomenclature. At the same time, PROSICOM was interested in a radio license, bidding for 94.5 FM.

In 2009, following the merger between Cablevisión and Multicanal, Grupo Clarín gave TSN's control in a condominium with PROSICOM. When PROSICOM decided to give control of the channel to Telecom, owner of Flow, the company was in charge of the damages given to its staff.

PROSICOM announced in November 2019 that it was going to reduce its news coverage, cutting the 15-minute weekend bulletin and the noontime newscast, as well as firing a journalist and a cameraman, without directly mentioning the cause, although it was speculated that it was to ease financial problems the company had. Such case caused concern in Necochea, with the local section of labor union ATE joining the condemnation against the decision.

On July 29, 2022, TSN aired its final newscast, announcing the definitive end of its transmissions on July 31, merging with Somos Mar del Plata (from Flow) to create Somos Mar del Plata-Necochea. The new combined channel didn't have the hypothesis of starting the local newscast for Necochea. The last newscast ended with a selection of footage, especially from its last few years, which served as a farewell for the channel, while wishing good luck to the Necochean producers and programs on the new channel. After its closure, TSN continued operations exclusively as a news portal.
