= Nílson Dias =

Brazilian footballer

Personal information
- Full name: Nílson Severino Dias
- Date of birth: 25 January 1952 (age 74)
- Place of birth: Rio de Janeiro, Brazil
- Position: Forward

Youth career
- –1970: Botafogo

Senior career*
Years	Team	Apps	(Gls)
1970–1978	Botafogo	301	(127)
1972	→ Deportivo Cali (loan)		
1978–1981	Leones Negros UdeG		
1981	→ Internacional (loan)		
1981–1983	Santos		
1982	→ Santa Cruz (loan)		
1983	→ São Cristóvão (loan)		
1983–1984	Académica		
1985	Olaria		
1985–1987	Al-Riffa		
1988	União Central		
1989	Sobradinho		

International career
1971	Brazil U20		
1971	Brazil Olympic	6	(3)
1977	Brazil	1	(0)
- * Club domestic league appearances and goals as of 11 February 2024

Nílson Severino Dias (born 25 January 1952), better known as Nílson Dias, is a Brazilian former professional footballer who played as a forward.

== Career ==
Striker revealed by Botafogo FR, he played for the club from 1970 to 1978, being traded to Leones Negros UdG. He returned to Brazil in 1981 at Internacional, and later played for Santos, Santa Cruz and São Cristóvão, leaving Brazil again to play for Académica de Coimbra and Al-Riffa in Bahrain. He currently lives in the United States. Between September 1977 and July 1978, he was part of the Botafogo FR squad that remained undefeated for 82 matches.

== International career ==
In 1971 Nilson Dias played for the U20 and Olympic teams, winning the Pre-Olympic tournament. In 1977 he played in an official friendly, against Bulgaria.

== Personal life ==
Nílson is brother of also footballer Nei Dias.

== Honours ==
Botafogo

- Taça Augusto Pereira da Mota: 1975

Internacional

- Campeonato Gaúcho: 1981

Al-Riffa

- Bahraini Premier League: 1987

Brazil U20

- Tournoi de Cannes: 1971

Brazil Olympic

- CONMEBOL Pre-Olympic Tournament: 1971
