= Maritime forest =

Ecological habitat

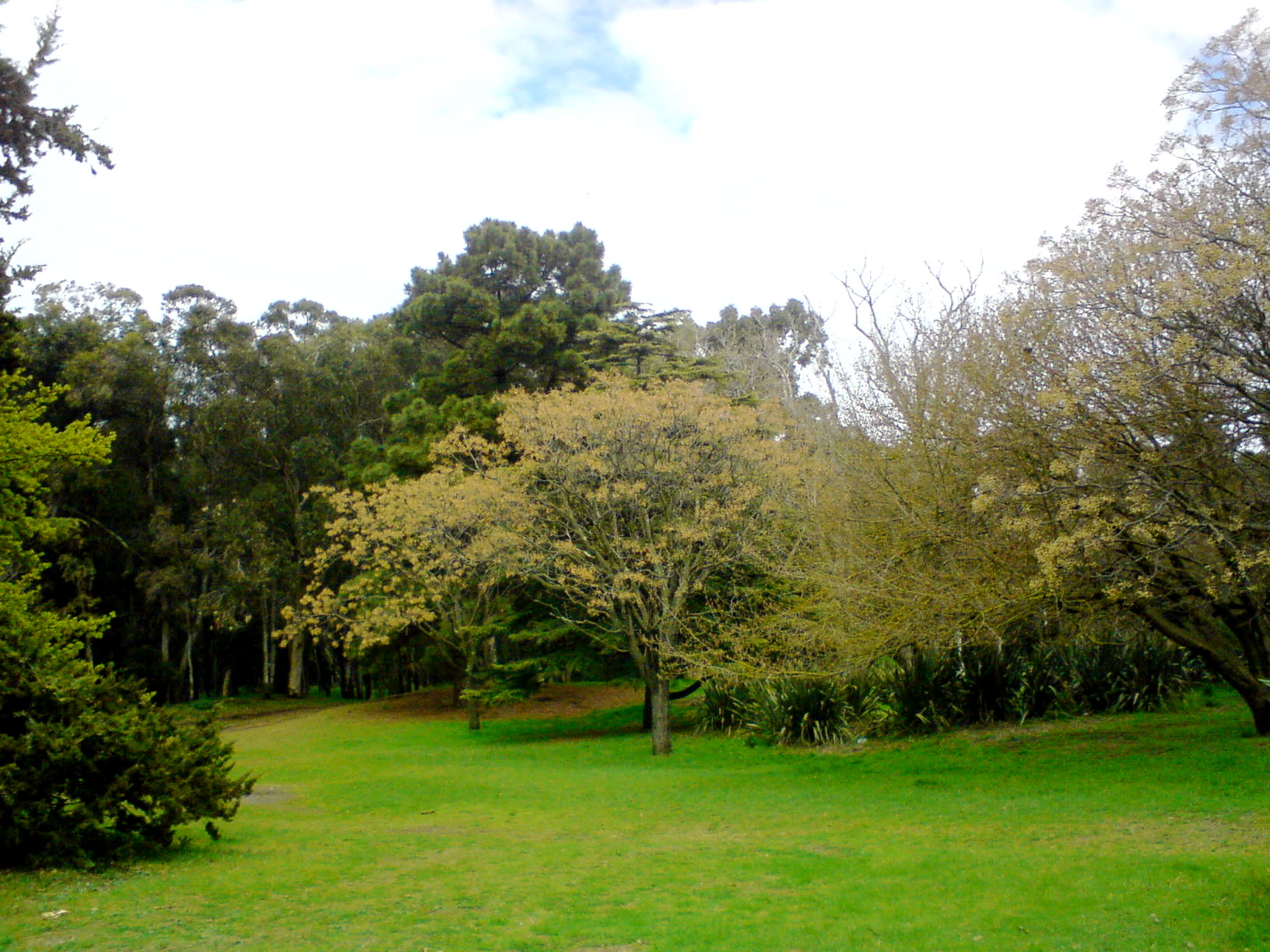
Miguel Lillo Park, a maritime forest nature preserve in Necochea, Argentina.

A maritime forest is an ocean coastal wooded habitat found on higher ground than dune areas within range of salt spray. They can be found along the Atlantic and Pacific Northwest coasts of the United States. The maritime forests of the southeast U.S. are often laurel forests. They can also be found in areas of South-East Asia, for example Chek Jawa, a wetland reserve which also features a maritime forest as one of the independent ecosystem.

== Flora ==
High winds, salt spray, and sandy soil provide a harsh environment for plant life. Maritime forests are composed of deciduous, coniferous, and broadleaf evergreens. Trees in maritime forests include the southern sugar maple, swamp dogwood, mockernut hickory, white ash, and the white poplar. Many plants in the maritime forests have a natural waxy coating to protect them from the salt spray. Most of the plants found in maritime forests are evergreens and shrubs along with a low population on pitcher plants.

== Fauna ==
Animals that live in these forests include foxes, deer, rabbits, tree frogs, raccoons, toads, and painted buntings.

== Places ==
Some places where maritime forests can be found are: Bald Head Island (North Carolina), Necochea (Argentina), Jekyll Island (Georgia), and on almost all barrier islands, such as the Currituck Banks Reserve in the Outer Banks of North Carolina.
