= Wálter Daga =

Peruvian footballer (1945–2000)

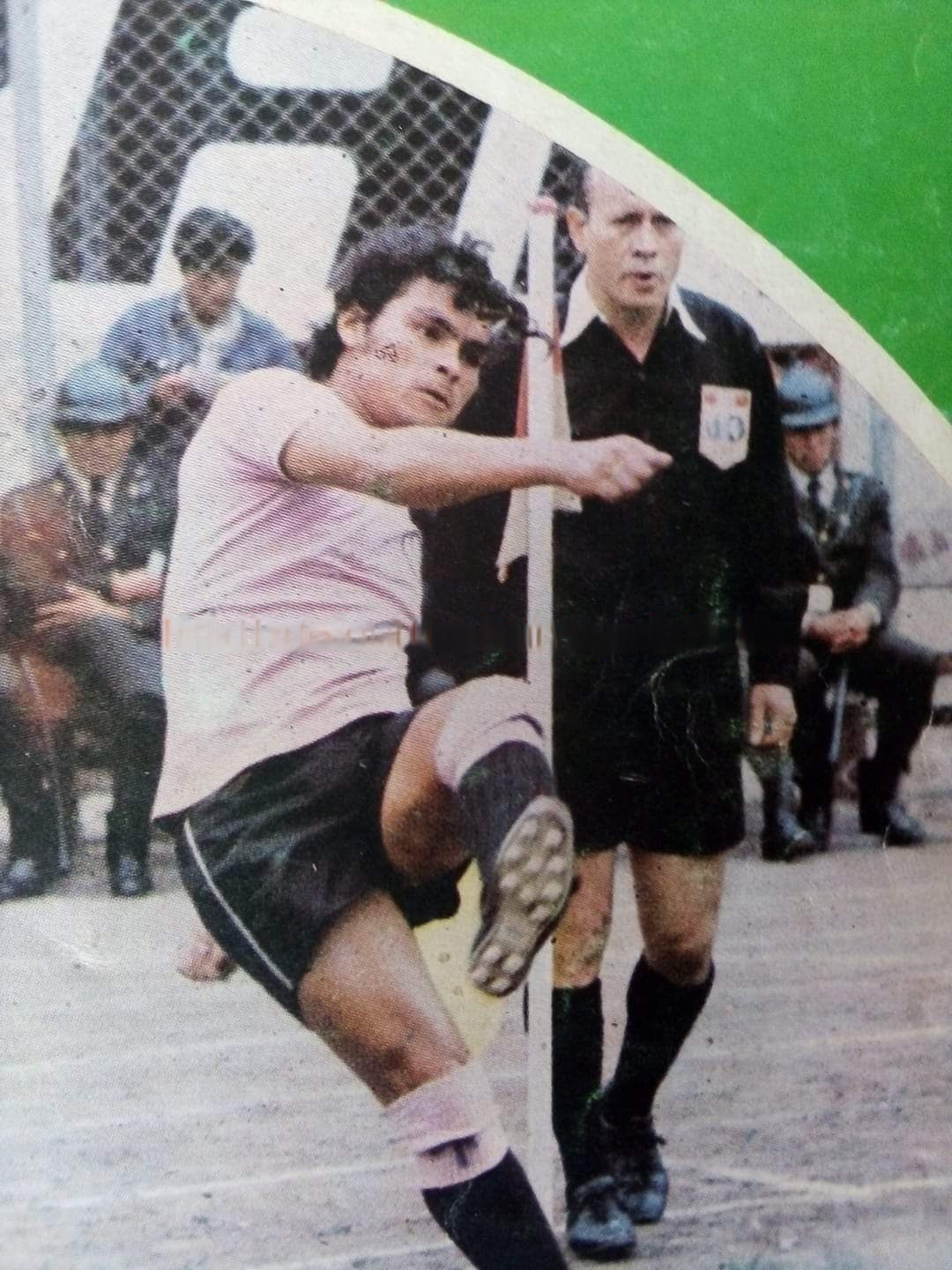

Personal information
- Full name: Walter Daga López
- Date of birth: 4 May 1951
- Place of birth: Callao, Peru
- Date of death: 26 December 2000 (aged 55)
- Place of death: Callao, Peru
- Position: Midfielder

Senior career*
Years	Team	Apps	(Gls)
1968–1974	Sport Boys		
1975	Carmen Mora de Encalada		
1975–1976	Alfonso Ugarte		
1978	ADT de Tarma		
1979	Sport Boys		
1986	Deportivo Enapu		

International career
1971–1972	Peru	9	(1)
- * Club domestic league appearances and goals

Walter Daga López (4 May 1945 – 26 December 2000) was a Peruvian footballer. Nicknamed "Pelón", he played as a midfielder for Sport Boys throughout the 1970s as he was known for his "Olympic goals" throughout his career with the club. He would also briefly represent Peru at the 1971 CONMEBOL Pre-Olympic Tournament.

== Club career ==
Daga began his club career with Sport Boys in 1968, an era in which players such as Juan Rivero Arias and Gerónimo Barbadillo would play alongside him as the new decade began.He was known for being able to score multiple goals from a large distance, free kicks and Olympic goals. After traveling abroad to play for Carmen Mora de Encalada in Ecuador, he played for Alfonso Ugarte for the remainder of the 1975 season as he would qualify to play in the 1976 Copa Libertadores under club manager Walter Milera. He would also play for ADT de Tarma and Deportivo Enapu.

== International career ==
Daga would also represent Peru on an international level, first participating in the 1971 CONMEBOL Pre-Olympic Tournament at Cali, Colombia under Lajos Baróti to have a chance in playing in the 1972 Summer Olympics. Despite leading the first group stage as well as scoring a goal in the match against Uruguay, Peru would narrowly miss qualification for the tournament. He would later make another appearance in a 3–2 victory against Mexico where he would play as a substitute for Percy Rojas at the 72nd minute on 9 August 1972.

== Personal life ==
Daga had purposefully only played for Sport Boys for a majority of his career as he had decided to only play for clubs within the Callao and Lima regions. He would continue supporting the club as a fan with his son Walter Daga Jr. as the two witnessed the club obtain their latest title at the 1984 Torneo Descentralizado. His granddaughter Claudia Azucena Daga Castro also represented Peru at the 2020 South American Under-20 Women's Football Championship. He died on the early morning of 26 December 2000 after suffering from a condition that had him unable to celebrate Christmas with his family.
