= Enéas (footballer) =

Brazilian footballer (1954–1988)

Personal information
- Full name: Enéas de Camargo
- Date of birth: 18 March 1954
- Place of birth: São Paulo, Brazil
- Date of death: 27 December 1988 (aged 34)
- Place of death: São Paulo, Brazil
- Position: Winger

Youth career
- 1968–1971: Portuguesa

Senior career*
Years	Team	Apps	(Gls)
1971–1980	Portuguesa	379	(167)
1977	→ Barretos (loan)		
1981	Bologna		
1981–1984	Palmeiras	94	(29)
1984	→ XV de Piracicaba (loan)		
1984–1985	Juventude		
1985–1986	Atlético Goianiense		
1986–1987	Desportiva		
1988	AA Central Brasileira		

International career
1971	Brazil Olympic	4	(2)
1974–1976	Brazil	3	(1)
- * Club domestic league appearances and goals as of 29 November 2023

Enéas de Camargo (18 March 1954 – 27 December 1988), simply known as Enéas, was a Brazilian professional footballer who played as a winger.

== Career ==
Enéas started his career in Portuguesa futsal, but was soon brought to the field football. He was largely responsible for the Campeonato Paulista title, although divided, in 1973. Often accused of “sleeping” on the field, he was without a doubt one of the greatest forwards that ever played for Portuguesa. He also played for Bologna and Palmeiras without the same performance.

== International career ==
Enéas played for the Brazil national team on three occasions: against Mexico in a friendly match in 1974, and against Paraguay (where he scored a goal) and Uruguay in the 1976 Taça do Atlântico.

== Death ==
Enéas died at age 34 in a car accident after crashing, in the back of a truck on the Av. Cruzeiro do Sul bridge, São Paulo. He spent 127 days hospitalized in treatment in the ICU, but on 27 December 1988, passed away.

== Honours ==
Portuguesa

- Campeonato Paulista: 1973
- Taça Estado de São Paulo: 1973
- Copa Governador do Estado de São Paulo: 1976

Atlético Goianiense

- Campeonato Goiano: 1985

Desportiva

- Campeonato Capixaba: 1986

Brazil

- Taça do Atlântico: 1976
- Taça Oswaldo Cruz: 1976
- Copa Rio Branco: 1976

Brazil Olympic

- CONMEBOL Pre-Olympic Tournament: 1971

== See also ==
- List of association football players who died during their careers
