= Nelson Torres =

Chilean footballer

Personal information
- Full name: Nelson Rubén Torres Flores
- Date of birth: 9 June 1944 (age 82)
- Place of birth: Santiago, Chile
- Position: Winger

Youth career
- Juventud Atacama
- 1961–1962: Green Cross

Senior career*
Years	Team	Apps	(Gls)
1962	Green Cross	2	(0)
1962–1972	Palestino	197	(24)
1964	→ Green Cross (loan)	33	(4)
1972–1973	Toluca		
1974	Unión Española	7	(0)

International career
1966–1968	Chile	4	(0)
- * Club domestic league appearances and goals

Nelson Rubén Torres Flores (born 19 June 1944) is a Chilean former football player and manager who played as a winger for clubs in Chile and Mexico.

== Club career ==
Torres came to the Green Cross youth system after a trial in front of the coach Dante Pesce in 1961. After joining the team, he won the 1962 national youth championship alongside players such as Leopoldo Vallejos, Juan Rodríguez Vega, Juan Carlos Gangas, among others.

He signed his first professional contract the same year and made his professional debut in a match against Universidad de Chile, facing his cousin Alfonso Sepúlveda, who helped him inside the field.

After making two appearances for Green Cross in 1962, he switched to Palestino the same year. He stayed with them until 1971 with a season on loan to Green Cross in 1964.

After Palestino was relegated to the 1971 Segunda División de Chile, he moved to Mexico in the middle of 1971 and signed with Toluca, where he coincided with his teammate in Palestino, Carlos Valenzuela.

Back in Chile, he joined Unión Española in 1974.

== International career ==
As a youth player, he was a member of a preliminary squad for the preparations of the 1964 South American U20 Championship.

At senior level, he made four appearances for the Chile national team between 1966 and 1968.

== Personal life ==
He is the cousin of the also Chile international footballer, Alfonso Sepúlveda, who died in 2021.

In addition, his older brother, Jorge, played for Universidad de Chile and Palestino and his cousin, José Failla Torres, played for Ferrobádminton. Another relatives played football at different levels: his younger brothers Hugo and Rodi and his cousin Sergio Torres.

As a student, he attended both the Andrés Bello and the Miguel Luis Amunátegui high schools.

In June 2022, he was honored as a historical player of Green Cross.
