= John Schepers =

Canadian soccer player (born 1943)

Personal information
- Full name: John Schepers
- Date of birth: February 27, 1943 (age 83)
- Place of birth: Tiel, Netherlands
- Date of death: May 22, 2026
- Place of death: Regina, SK
- Height: 1.73 m (5 ft 8 in)
- Position: Forward

Senior career*
Years	Team	Apps	(Gls)
1959–1962	Winnipeg AN&AF Scottish FC		
1963–1966	Regina Concordia SC		
1967–1968	Calgary Buffalo Kickers		
1969–1971	Regina Concordia SC		
1971	Toronto Metros	3	(1)
1972–1976	Winnipeg Thistle FC		
1977–1983	Regina Concordia SC		
- * Club domestic league appearances and goals

John Schepers (27 February 1943) is a Canadian former soccer player. He was a national champion with Winnipeg AN&AF Scottish (1962) and a three-time Western Canada Soccer League winner with Regina Concordia (1963, 1964) and Calgary Buffalo Kickers (1968).

At the international level, Schepers first represented Canada in 1960 on a tour of the Soviet Union and Britain. In 1971, he made 10 international "B" appearances with Canada's Olympic team in Olympic Qualifiers and the 1971 Pan American Games in Colombia.

As a teenager in 1962, he scored four goals in the Canada Soccer Championship final as Winnipeg AN&AF Scottish won 6–0 over Edmonton Edelweiss.

== Personal life ==
While Schepers was born in Netherlands, he was just 10 years old when his family moved to Winnipeg, Manitoba. He was just 15 years old when he started playing senior soccer in Winnipeg. He worked as a teacher and vice-principal in Regina for 30 years.
