= Vágner (footballer, born 1950) =

Brazilian footballer

Personal information
- Full name: Roberto Vágner Chinoca
- Date of birth: 2 May 1950 (age 76)
- Place of birth: São Paulo, Brazil
- Position: Defender

International career
Years	Team	Apps	(Gls)
- Brazil Olympic

Roberto Vágner Chinoca (born 2 May 1950), known as just Vágner, is a Brazilian former footballer who played as a defender. He competed in the men's tournament at the 1972 Summer Olympics.
