= Carlos Basombrío =

Peruvian footballer (born 1971)

Personal information
- Full name: Carlos Alberto Basombrío Ormeño
- Date of birth: 21 October 1971 (age 55)
- Place of birth: Lima, Peru
- Height: 1.66 m (5 ft 5 in)
- Position: Defender

Senior career*
Years	Team	Apps	(Gls)
1995–1998	Alianza Lima		
1998–1999	Veria	15	(0)
2000–2002	Alianza Lima		
2002	Juan Aurich		

International career
1994	Peru	1	(0)
- * Club domestic league appearances and goals

Carlos Alberto Basombrío Ormeño (born 21 October 1971 in Lima) is a former Peruvian footballer.

== Club career ==
Basombrío spent most of his career playing for clubs in Peru, including Alianza Lima and Juan Aurich. He also had a spell with Veria in the Super League Greece.

== International career ==
Basombrío made one appearance for the senior Peru national football team, a friendly against Colombia on 3 May 1994.
