= Nelson Pedetti =

Uruguayan footballer (born 1954)

Personal information
- Full name: Nelson Pedetti
- Date of birth: 7 February 1954 (age 72)
- Place of birth: Montevideo, Uruguay
- Height: 1.78 m (5 ft 10 in)
- Position: Forward

Senior career*
Years	Team	Apps	(Gls)
1974–1975	Racing Montevideo		
1975–1978	Nacional	56	(26)
1979–1980	Cobreloa	62	(25)
1981	Deportes Iquique	26	(10)
1982	Deportes Antofagasta		
1982–1986	Cobresal	89	(29)
- * Club domestic league appearances and goals

Nelson Pedetti (born February 7, 1954, in Montevideo, Uruguay) is a former Uruguayan footballer who played as a forward for clubs in Uruguay and Chile (Cobreloa, Cobresal Deportes Antofagasta and Deportes Iquique).

== Teams ==
- (Uruguay) Racing Montevideo 1974–1975
- (Uruguay) Nacional 1975–1978
- (Chile) Cobreloa 1979-1980
- (Chile) Deportes Iquique 1981
- (Chile) Deportes Antofagasta 1982
- (Chile) Cobresal 1982-1986

== Titles ==
- (Chile) Cobreloa 1980 Primera División
- (Chile) Cobresal 1983 Segunda División
