= Oswaldo Mackenzie =

Colombian footballer (born 1973)

Personal information
- Date of birth: 19 January 1973 (age 53)
- Place of birth: Barranquilla, Colombia
- Height: 1.75 m (5 ft 9 in)
- Position: Midfielder

Senior career*
| Years | Team | Apps | (Gls) |
| 1990–1991 | Atlético Junior | | |
| 1992 | Real Cartagena | | |
| 1993–1995 | Atlético Junior | | |
| 1996–2000 | Atlético Nacional | | |
| 2001 | Barcelona SC | | |
| 2001 | Atlético Nacional | | |
| 2002 | Atlético Junior | | |
| 2003 | Centauros Villavicencio | | |
| 2004 | Atlético Nacional | | |
| 2005 | Alianza Lima | | |
| 2005 | Unión Magdalena | | |
| 2005 | Estudiantes de Mérida | | |
| 2006 | Club Olimpia | | |
| 2006 | Deportes Quindío | | |
| 2007 | Real Cartagena | | |
| 2007 | América de Cali | | |
| 2008 | Atlético Junior | | |

International career^{‡}
| 1995 | Colombia | 2 | (1) |
- * Club domestic league appearances and goals ‡ National team caps and goals as of 12:14, 4 August 2020 (UTC)

Oswaldo Mackenzie (born 19 January 1973) is a Colombian former footballer who played as a midfielder. He played for clubs of Colombia, Ecuador, Venezuela, Peru and Paraguay. He also played for the Colombia national football team.

== Career ==
Mackenzie played professional football for Junior de Barranquilla, Real Cartagena, Atlético Nacional, Centauros Villavicencio, Unión Magdalena, Deportes Quindío and América de Cali in Colombia, and Barcelona Sporting Club, Alianza Lima, Estudiantes de Mérida and Club Olimpia abroad.

== Teams ==
- (Colombia) Atlético Junior 1990–1991
- (Colombia) Real Cartagena 1992
- (Colombia) Atlético Junior 1993–1995
- (Colombia) Atlético Nacional 1996–2000
- (Ecuador) Barcelona SC 2001
- (Colombia) Atlético Nacional 2001
- (Colombia) Atlético Junior 2002
- (Colombia) Centauros Villavicencio 2003
- (Colombia) Atlético Nacional 2004
- (Peru) Alianza Lima 2005
- (Colombia) Unión Magdalena 2005
- (Venezuela) Estudiantes de Mérida 2005
- (Paraguay) Club Olimpia 2006
- (Colombia) Deportes Quindío 2006
- (Colombia) Real Cartagena 2007
- (Colombia) América de Cali 2007
- (Colombia) Atlético Junior 2008

== Titles ==
- (Colombia) Atlético Junior 1993, 1995 (Colombian League)
- (Colombia) Atlético Nacional 1999 (Colombian League)
- (Colombia) Atlético Nacional 1998, 2000 (Copa Merconorte)
