= Necochea =

City in Buenos Aires Province, Argentina

- City and Port
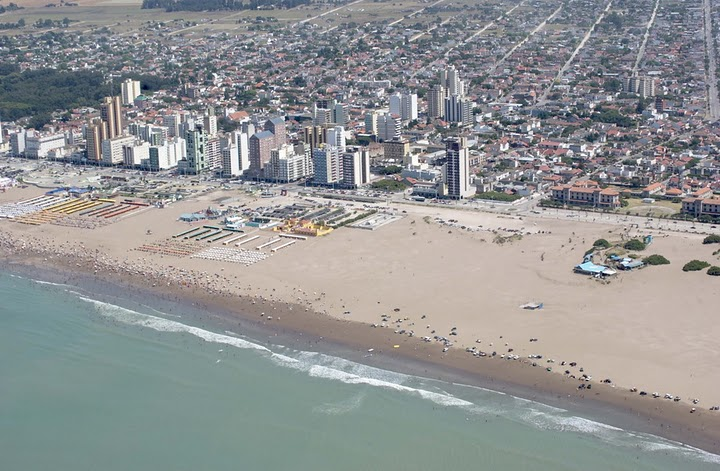

- Location in Argentina
- Coordinates: 38°32′S 58°45′W
- Country: Argentina
- Province: Buenos Aires
- Partido: Necochea
- Founded: October 12, 1881; 144 years ago

Government
  - Intendant: Arturo Rojas (Nueva Necochea)
- Elevation: 16 m (52 ft)

Population (2010 census [INDEC])
  - Total: 90,000
- CPA Base: B 7630
- Area code: +54 2262
- Climate: Cfb
- Website: necochea.gov.ar

Necochea is a port and beach city in the southwest of Buenos Aires Province, Argentina. The city is located on the Atlantic Coast, along the mouth of the Quequén Grande River, 528 km (328 mi) from Buenos Aires and 120 km (75 mi) southwest of Mar del Plata. The city proper has 90,000 inhabitants per the 2010 census [INDEC] and is the seat of government for Necochea Partido.

The neighboring Port of Quequén, located on the eastern bank of the Quequén Grande River, is one of the most important ports in Argentina, and the gateway for the agricultural production of the southeast of the Province of Buenos Aires.

== Overview ==
The area around Necochea was first charted by Jesuit clergymen José Cardiel and Thomas Falkner, who reached the mouth of the Quequén Grande River in 1748. Necochea itself was established as a defensive outpost against Malón raids on October 12, 1881, by National Guard commander Ángel Murga. The new settlement was named in honor of General Mariano Necochea, a military commander during Argentine War of Independence. Founded on a seaside estate owned by Eustoquio Díaz Vélez, jr., the latter's father, General Eustoquio Díaz Vélez, had likewise played an important role during the struggle. A Buenos Aires Great Southern Railway station was opened in 1894, and the Díaz Vélez family established the Villa Díaz Vélez resort in 1902. The neighboring communities were incorporated into the town of Necochea in 1911.

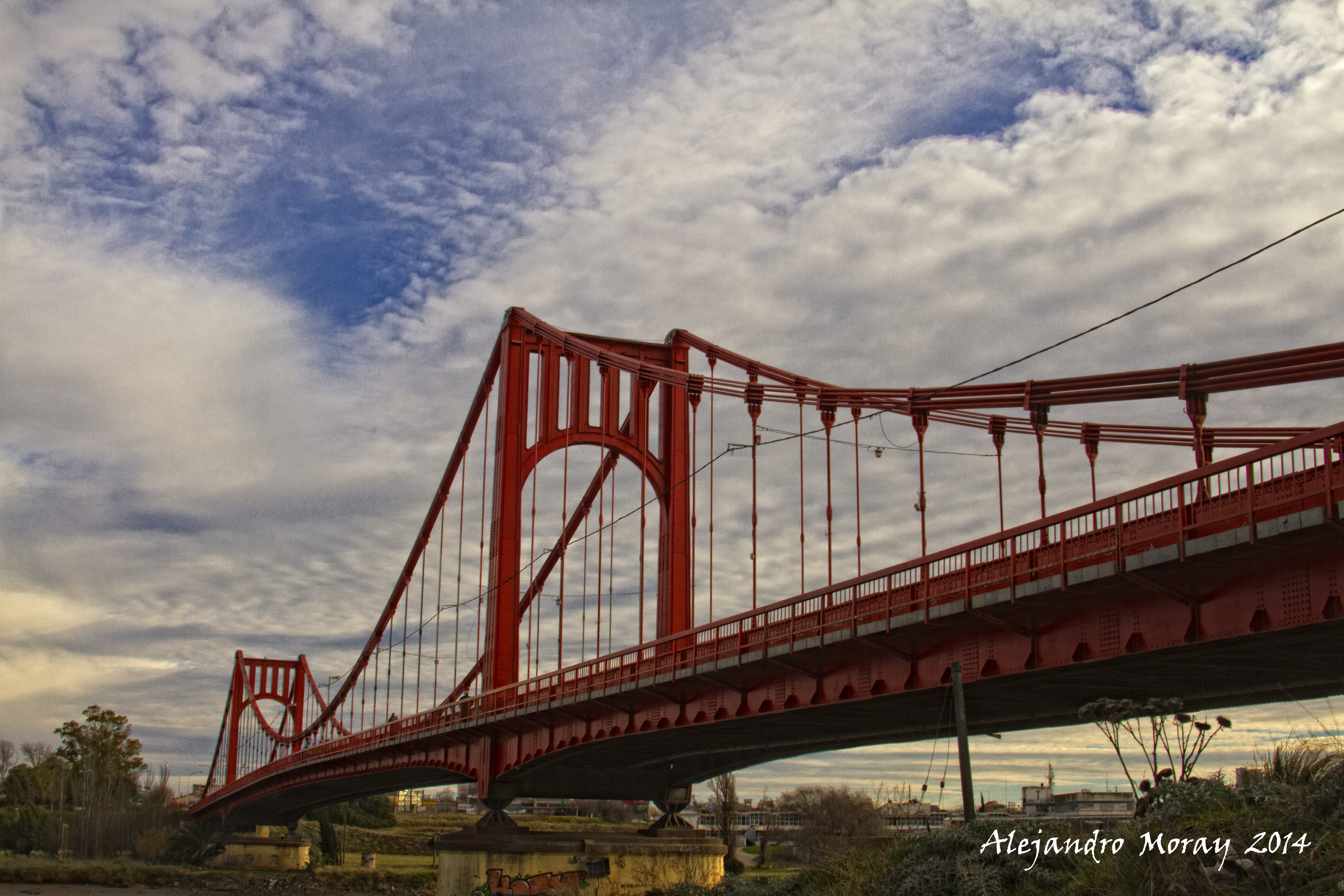
Hipólito Yrigoyen Bridge

A suspension bridge made Necochea accessible to motorists; inaugurated in 1929, the new bridge was named after President Hipólito Yrigoyen and was one of two identical suspension bridges in Argentina (the other being in Santa Fe). A tram service operated in the town between 1913 and 1940. The inaugural of Port Quequén in 1922 made the area a leading railhead for the agriculture of Argentina; the port handled a million tons of freight by 1954 and would grow to over 3 million tons by 1991.

Necochea became an important domestic tourism destination in Argentina during the 20th century, and the number of registered hotel rooms surpassed 50,000 by 2011; occupation by then exceeded 95% during the summer high season. Its municipal beaches grew to 72 kilometres (45 mi), reaching up to 200 metres (660 ft) in depth. The 640 hectare (1600 acre) Miguel Lillo Park, established in 1979, is the only public maritime forest nature reserve in Argentina. The park is also known for its swan's lake, tourist railway, and the Regional Historical Museum housed since 1981 in the Spanish Colonial Revival house originally belonging to the Díaz Vélez estancia.

Other local landmarks and attractions include seashore grottoes (notable among them Cueva del Tigre, named for a 19th-century gaucho who reputedly evaded authorities for years by hiding in the grotto later named for him); the Parish of Our Lady of Lourdes (consecrated in 1957); the Necochea Golf Club (founded in 1955); the Fishermen's Pier (1970); the Quequén Grande River rapids; and Quequén port, which features two breakwaters (1908), a lighthouse (1921), and a South American sea lion reserve. The casino was originally inaugurated in 1929; it was later housed in a modernist structure that opened in 1973 and was rebuilt after a 2001 fire, but which burn again in 2020 and no longer exists.

Some of the most popular recurring events in Necochea are the National Festival of Children's Shows (Fiesta Nacional de Espectáculos para Niños), held since 1962 at Miguel Lillo Park on each Epiphany Day (January 6); and the Festival of Cultures (Fiesta de las Colectividades), celebrating the contributions of the numerous immigrant communities and their descendants to both Necochea and Argentina. The festival, held at the end of January, includes stands representing the immigrant cultures common to much of Argentina (Italians, Spaniards, Danish Argentines, Middle Easterners, and Germans, among others), as well as Chileans in the recent years.

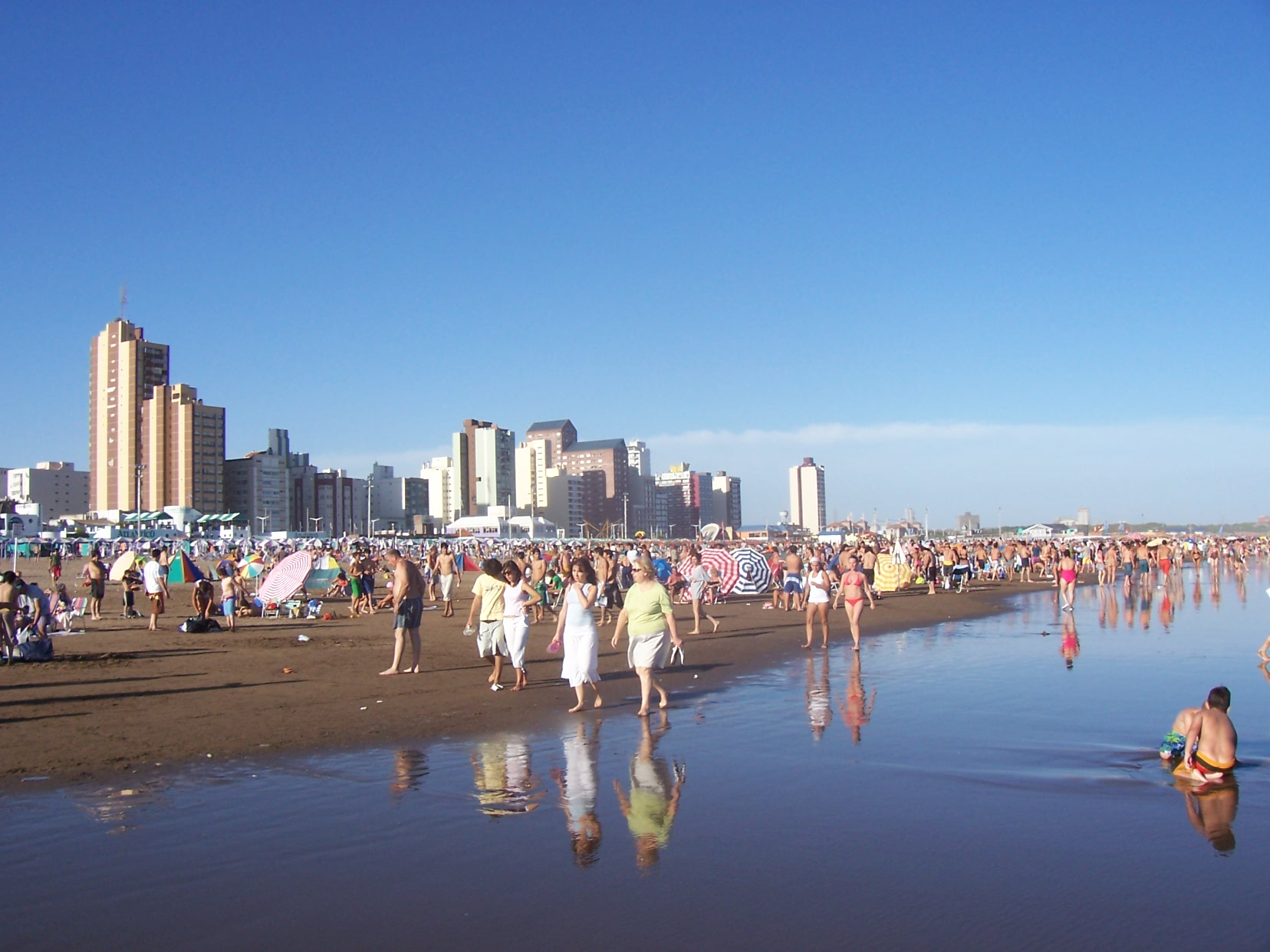
Villa Díaz Vélez (Díaz Vélez Village)

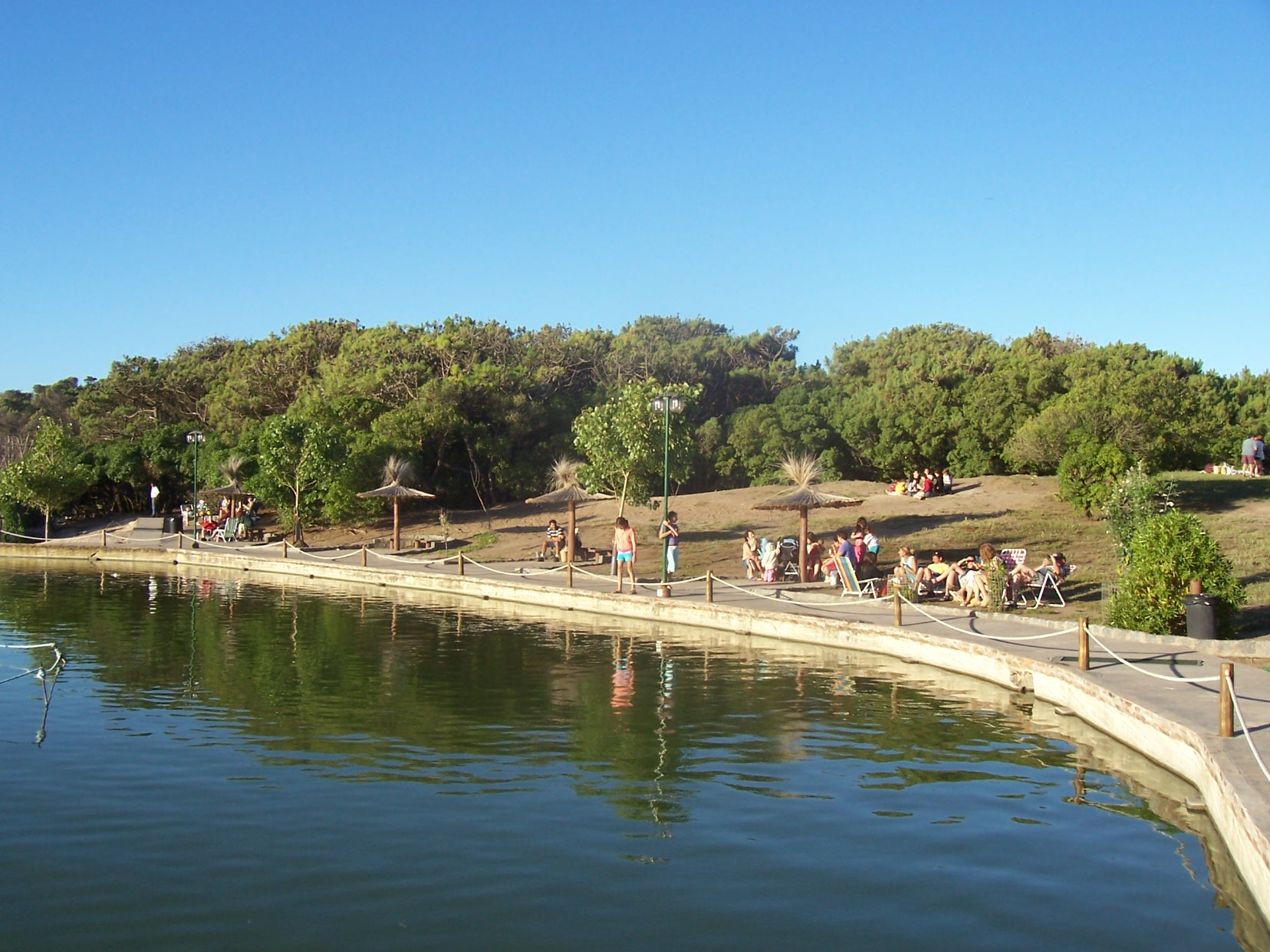
Swan's Lake in Miguel Lillo Park

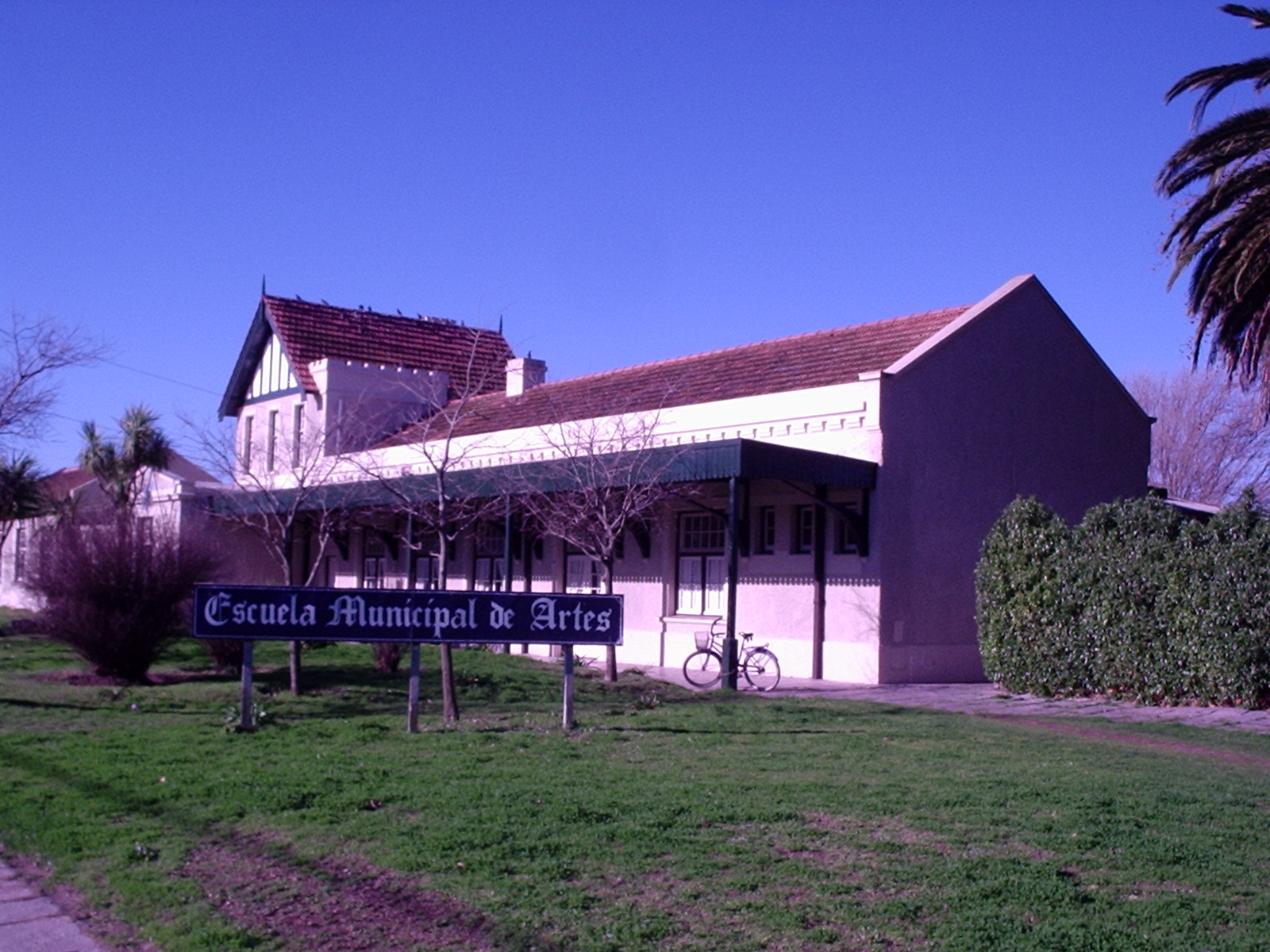
Former train station, currently an arts school

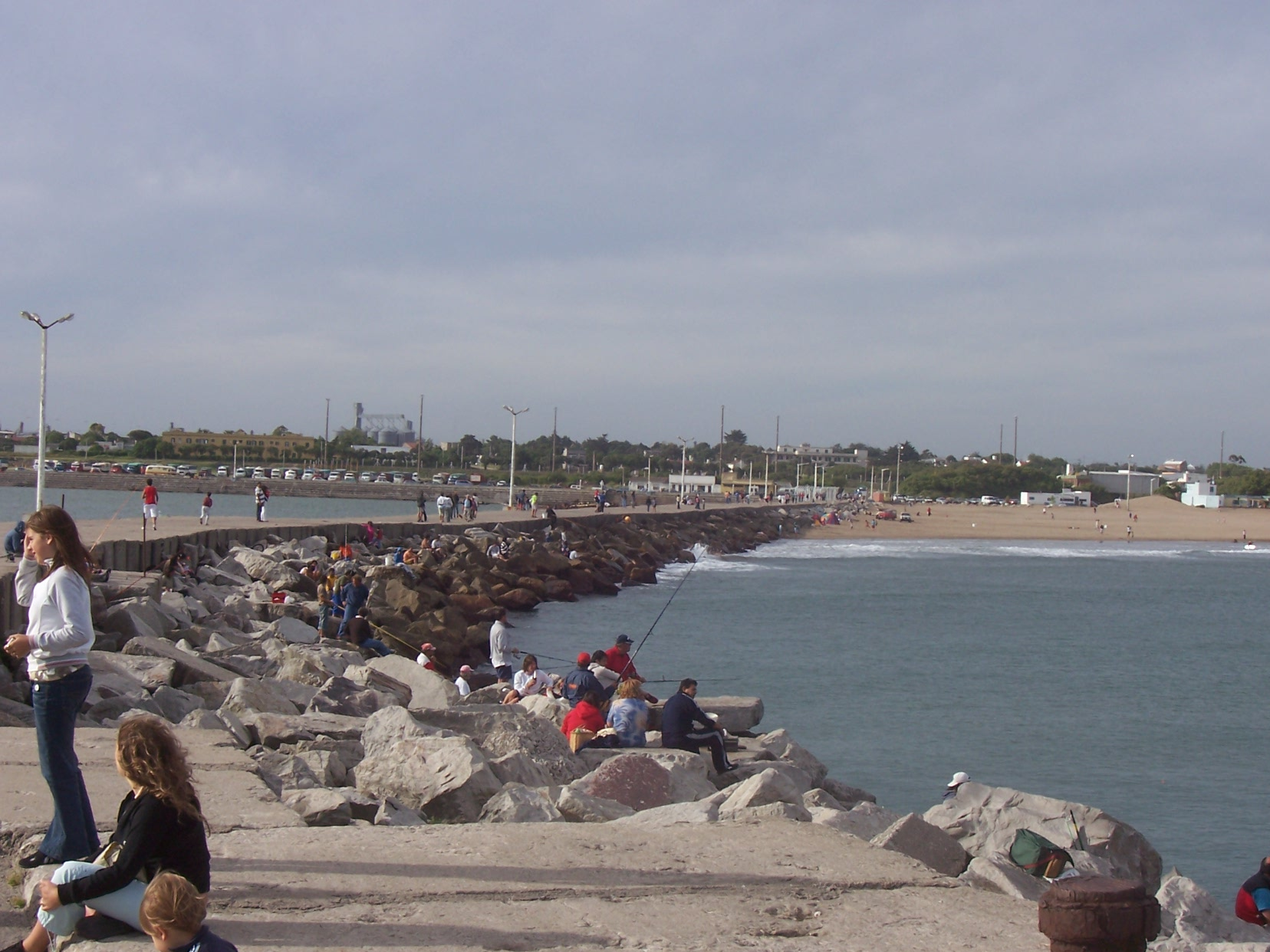
The North Breakwater (Escollera Norte) at the Port of Quequén

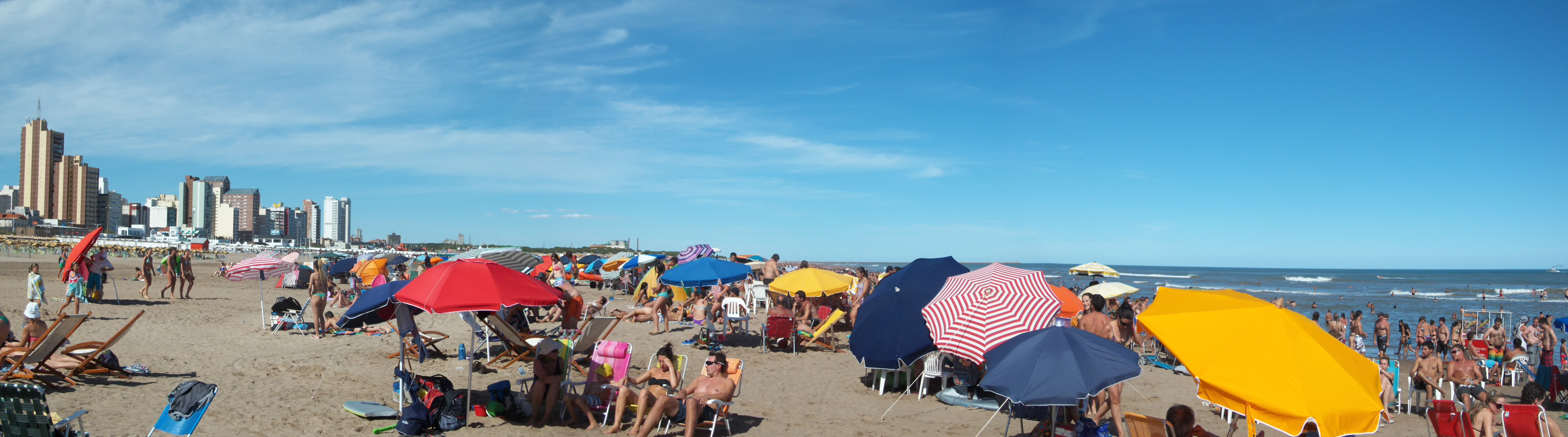
Central Beach of Necochea in Villa Díaz Vélez

== Climate ==
Under the Köppen climate classification Necochea has a very warm oceanic climate with warm to hot summers and mild winters, with rainfall being spread over the year. The somewhat cool summer nights and the rainfall spread prevents it from being part of the various subtropical ranges. January means are around 21 °C (70 °F) and the winter months are around 8 °C (46 °F), the latter being a more typical oceanic value.

Climate data for Necochea
Month	Jan	Feb	Mar	Apr	May	Jun	Jul	Aug	Sep	Oct	Nov	Dec	Year
Mean daily maximum °C (°F)	27.6 (81.7)	26.5 (79.7)	24.6 (76.3)	21.0 (69.8)	16.6 (61.9)	13.2 (55.8)	13.1 (55.6)	14.6 (58.3)	17.5 (63.5)	19.3 (66.7)	22.4 (72.3)	26.4 (79.5)	20.2 (68.4)
Daily mean °C (°F)	20.9 (69.6)	20.0 (68.0)	18.1 (64.6)	14.7 (58.5)	11.1 (52.0)	8.4 (47.1)	8.2 (46.8)	8.8 (47.8)	11.2 (52.2)	13.3 (55.9)	15.9 (60.6)	19.6 (67.3)	14.2 (57.6)
Mean daily minimum °C (°F)	13.7 (56.7)	13.1 (55.6)	11.8 (53.2)	9.0 (48.2)	6.2 (43.2)	4.0 (39.2)	3.6 (38.5)	3.4 (38.1)	4.8 (40.6)	7.2 (45.0)	8.8 (47.8)	12.4 (54.3)	8.2 (46.8)
Average precipitation mm (inches)	85 (3.3)	71 (2.8)	101 (4.0)	83 (3.3)	51 (2.0)	72 (2.8)	57 (2.2)	39 (1.5)	47 (1.9)	75 (3.0)	47 (1.9)	102 (4.0)	830 (32.7)
Average precipitation days	9	9	11	10	10	12	12	9	7	12	9	12	122
Average snowy days	0	0	0	0	0	0.7	0.1	0.1	0	0	0	0	0.9
Average relative humidity (%)	67	73	76	78	83	85	86	81	78	79	72	68	77
Mean monthly sunshine hours	238.7	223.2	198.4	168.0	117.8	96.0	108.5	164.3	165.0	198.4	231.0	213.9	2,123.2
Mean daily sunshine hours	7.7	7.9	6.4	5.6	3.8	3.2	3.5	5.3	5.5	6.4	7.7	6.9	5.83
Source 1: Servicio Meteorológico Nacional, UNLP (snowfall data)
Source 2: (sun 1971–1980)

== Settlements ==
- Quequén
- Juan N.Fernández
- Nicanor Olivera (Est. La Dulce)
- Claraz
- Ramón Santamarina
- Balneario Los Angeles
- Costa Bonita

== Media ==
TSN Necochea operates a news portal. Prior to 2022 there was also a local channel owned by the company.

== Notable people ==
- Benedicto Campos
- Alfredo Marcenac, a student whose murder by serial shooter Martín Ríos in July 2006 in Buenos Aires caused national outcry regarding the access to firearms by disturbed individuals
- Eduardo Ramos
- Francisca Rojas
