= Luis Pestarino =

Argentine association football referee

- Full name: Luis Pestarino
- Born: May 28, 1928 (age 98); Buenos Aires, Argentina

International
| Years | League | Role |
| 1970s | FIFA-listed | Referee |

Luis Pestarino (born 28 May 1928) is a former Argentine football referee who officiated at major international and club competitions during the 1960s and 1970s. He is best known for his work in continental competitions, World Cup qualifiers, and the Olympic Games football tournament.

== Refereeing Career ==
Luis Pestarino was born on 28 May 1928 in Buenos Aires, Argentina. Pestarino became one of Argentina’s notable referees during the 1960s and 1970s.

=== Olympic Games ===
He was appointed as an official at the 1972 Summer Olympics football tournament in Munich. During the competition, Pestarino served in multiple roles, including referee and linesman, officiating matches such as East Germany vs. Soviet Union and Hungary vs. West Germany.

=== International Matches and Competitions ===
Pestarino officiated in a number of World Cup qualifying matches and international fixtures for national teams throughout his career. Statistics compiled by European football databases list various international appointments and match records under his name.

=== Club Competitions ===
At club level, Pestarino took charge of matches in South American continental competitions, including Copa Libertadores fixtures and the Intercontinental Cup.
