= Luis Oruezábal =

Argentine footballer

Personal information
- Full name: Luis Oruezábal López
- Date of birth: 13 May 1952
- Place of birth: Buenos Aires, Argentina
- Date of death: 31 December 2014 (aged 62)
- Place of death: Granada, Spain
- Height: 1.66 m (5 ft 5 in)
- Position: Forward

Senior career*
Years	Team	Apps	(Gls)
1970–1974	Vélez Sarsfield		
1974–1977	Granada	41	(3)
1977–1980	Jaén	32	(3)
- * Club domestic league appearances and goals

Luis Oruezábal López (13 May 1952 – 31 December 2014) was an Argentine footballer who played as a forward.

== Football career ==
Born in Buenos Aires to Spanish parents that emigrated from Burgos in the 1940s, Oruezábal played for Club Atlético Vélez Sarsfield in his country, returning to the land of his ancestors in early 1974 after signing for Granada CF and also representing Andalusia neighbours Real Jaén, retiring in 1980 at only 28 due to a serious injury.

Oruezábal made his debut in La Liga on 28 April 1974, playing 60 minutes in a 0–2 away loss against Racing de Santander.

== Post-retirement / Death ==
After retiring settled in Granada, going on to manage a restaurant alongside fellow footballer Ladislao Mazurkiewicz named Chikito.

On 31 December 2014, emergency crews were called to his residence where four people, including himself, were found unconscious. Three were resuscitated and taken to hospital, but he eventually died at the age of 62. The house contained carbon monoxide coming from a wood-burning fireplace, installed in the basement of the house with improper ventilation.
