= Carlos Cortés (footballer) =

Colombian footballer (born 2001)

Personal information
- Full name: Carlos Manuel Cortés Barreiro
- Date of birth: 17 September 2001 (age 25)
- Place of birth: Tumaco, Colombia
- Height: 1.86 m (6 ft 1 in)
- Position: Striker

Team information
- Current team: Llaneros (on loan from Internacional Palmira)
- Number: 30

Youth career
- América de Cali

Senior career*
Years	Team	Apps	(Gls)
2020–2023	América de Cali	11	(0)
2022	→ Fortaleza CEIF (loan)	15	(2)
2022	→ Santiago Wanderers (loan)	11	(2)
2023	→ Cortuluá (loan)	12	(2)
2024–	Internacional Palmira	25	(4)
2024	→ Deportes Tolima (loan)	23	(3)
2025–	→ Llaneros (loan)	11	(2)

International career^{‡}
2023–2024	Colombia U23	8	(1)
- * Club domestic league appearances and goals as of 12 December 2025 ‡ National team caps and goals as of 13 April 2024

Carlos Manuel Cortés Barreiro (born 17 September 2001) is a Colombian footballer who plays as a striker for Llaneros, on loan from Internacional Palmira.

== Club career ==
A striker from the América de Cali youth system, Cortés made his professional debut with them in a 1–0 loss against Deportes Tolima on 26 September 2020. Later, he was loaned out to Fortaleza CEIF (2022) and Cortuluá (2023) in his homeland and Santiago Wanderers in the Primera B de Chile.

In 2024, Cortés signed with Internacional Palmira, the club that replaced Cortulúa in the Colombian football, and subsequently he was loaned out to Deportes Tolima in the top level .

== International career ==
Cortés represented Colombia at under-23 level in the 2023 Pan American Games, friendlies against Peru and the 2024 Pre-Olympic Tournament.
