= Víctor Campaz =

Colombian footballer (born 1949)

Personal information
- Full name: Víctor Campaz Rengifo
- Date of birth: 21 May 1949 (age 77)
- Position: Forward

International career
Years	Team	Apps	(Gls)
1975	Colombia	3	(0)

Víctor Campaz Rengifo (born 21 May 1949) is a Colombian former footballer. He played in three matches for the Colombia national football team in 1975. He was also part of Colombia's squad for the 1975 Copa América tournament.
