= Benjamín Cardona =

Colombian footballer (born 1957)

Personal information
- Full name: Benjamín Cardona G.
- Date of birth: 17 July 1957 (age 69)
- Place of birth: La Unión, Valle del Cauca, Colombia
- Height: 1.70 m (5 ft 7 in)
- Position: Forward

Senior career*
Years	Team	Apps	(Gls)
1977–1983	Pereira		
1984	Atlético Nacional		
1985–1987	Pereira		
- * Club domestic league appearances and goals

Benjamín Cardona (born 17 July 1957 in La Unión, Valle del Cauca) is a Colombian former football player, mostly known as "Mincho".

== Club career ==
Cardona played as a forward and began his career in Deportivo Pereira. He scored 21 goals for the club during the 1979 season.

== International career ==
He played for Colombia at the 1980 Olympic Games in the Soviet Union.
