= Raúl Alberto Morales =

Bolivian footballer (born 1951)

Personal information
- Date of birth: 4 June 1951 (age 75)
- Place of birth: La Paz, Bolivia
- Position: Forward

International career
| Years | Team | Apps | (Gls) |
| 1975–1977 | Bolivia | 8 | (0) |

Raúl Alberto Morales (born 4 June 1951) is a Bolivian footballer. He played in eight matches for the Bolivia national football team from 1975 to 1977. He was also part of Bolivia's squad for the 1975 Copa América tournament.
