= 1971 Campeonato Nacional Segunda División =

Segunda División
- Season: 1971
- Champions: Naval
- Promoted: Naval
- Relegated: None
- Top goalscorer: Fernando Quinteros (19 goals); Bádminton

The 1971 Segunda División de Chile was the 20th season of the Segunda División de Chile.

Naval was the tournament's champion.

== Table ==
Pos	Team	Pld	W	D	L	GF	GA	GD	Pts	Promotion or relegation
1	Naval (C)	26	16	7	3	46	18	+28	39	Champions. Promoted to 1972 Primera División de Chile.
2	Ñublense	26	14	10	2	44	23	+21	38	
3	Palestino	26	13	10	3	42	21	+21	36	
4	Deportes Ovalle	26	13	9	4	57	32	+25	35	
5	Deportes Colchagua	26	9	11	6	34	37	−3	29	
6	Ferroviarios	26	7	14	5	33	30	+3	28	
7	Coquimbo Unido	26	8	9	9	42	43	−1	25	
8	Santiago Morning	26	8	8	10	45	45	0	24	
9	Independiente de Cauquenes	26	9	6	11	28	36	−8	24	
10	Lister Rossel	26	5	10	11	28	46	−18	20	
11	San Luis de Quillota	26	7	5	14	32	47	−15	19	
12	San Antonio Unido	26	4	9	13	33	48	−15	17	
13	Iberia	26	6	5	15	32	55	−23	17	
14	Badminton Curicó (R)	26	5	3	18	39	54	−15	13	Relegated

Source: rsssf.com
(C) Champions; (R) Relegated

== See also ==
- Chilean football league system
