= Ángel Torres (footballer, born 1952) =

Colombian footballer

Personal information
- Date of birth: 8 May 1952 (age 74)
- Position: Forward

Senior career*
Years	Team	Apps	(Gls)
- Deportivo Cali
- * Club domestic league appearances and goals

Ángel Torres (born 8 May 1952) is a Colombian former footballer who competed in the 1972 Summer Olympics.
