= Álvaro Santamaría (footballer, born 1950) =

Colombian footballer

Personal information
- Full name: Carlos Álvaro Santamaría Ochoa
- Date of birth: 28 May 1950 (age 76)
- Place of birth: Medellín, Colombia
- Height: 1.80 m (5 ft 11 in)
- Position: Forward

Senior career*
Years	Team	Apps	(Gls)
- Independiente Medellín
- Once Caldas
- Atlético Junior
- * Club domestic league appearances and goals

Álvaro Santamaría (born 28 May 1950) is a Colombian former footballer who competed in the 1972 Summer Olympics.
