= Víctor Pacheco (footballer, born 1974) =

Colombian footballer

Personal information
- Full name: Víctor Danilo Pacheco Bustamante
- Date of birth: 24 September 1974 (age 52)
- Place of birth: Suán, Colombia
- Height: 1.61 m (5 ft 3 in)
- Position: Midfielder

Senior career*
| Years | Team | Apps | (Gls) |
| 1992–1999 | Atlético Junior | 361 | (78) |
| 1999–2000 | Independiente Medellín | 59 | (17) |
| 2000–2002 | Atlante | 12 | (0) |
| 2002–2003 | Unión Magdalena | | |
| 2003–2005 | Atlante | 78 | (4) |
| 2006 | Atlético Junior | | |
| 2006–2007 | América de Cali | 31 | (3) |
| 2007 | Bucaramanga | 16 | (2) |
| 2008 | Boyacá Chicó | 36 | (3) |
| 2009 | Pasto | 9 | (0) |
| 2009 | Atlético Junior | 6 | (0) |
| 2010 | Bogotá | | |
| 2011 | Uniautónoma | 30 | (7) |

International career
| 1993–2005 | Colombia | 28 | (3) |
- * Club domestic league appearances and goals

Víctor Danilo Pacheco Bustamente (born 25 September 1974) is a former Colombian footballer.

== Club career ==
Pacheco began his professional career with Junior, with which he won two domestic titles (1993 and 1995), participating in the Copa Libertadores 1994 y 1996.

After playing for Atlante from Mexico, he returned to Junior where his performance was less well than expected. He was then signed for Unión Magdalena, playing for it from 2004 to 2006. He then was signed for América de Cali in 2006. The following year, he was signed for Atlético Bucaramanga, where he also underperformed.

At the beginnings of 2008, he was signed for Boyacá Chicó, nevertheless, due to the economic crisis in the team, Pacheco left it and flew to Canada, where he tried out for Toronto FC, club of the Major League Soccer. However, the club rejected him for not meeting expectations, prompting him to return to the Boyaca Chicó team. In the same season 2008, Pacheco won a domestic title with his team, being it the third of his football career in Colombia, after his team won the final match of the Apertura tournament against America de Cali. At the end of the same year, the contracts for Pacheco and other football players were terminated by Boyacá Chicó.

After having played for Chicó, he played for Deportivo Pasto for six months but he was not given much continuity for playing. He then was signed for Junior, for which he played for 6 months too.

In the year 2010, after being without playing for 6 months, he started playing for Bogotá F.C. from Categoría Primera B. By 2011, Victor Danilo was signed for the new team of primera B Uniautónoma F.C. from Barranquilla.

== International career ==
Pacheco has made 28 appearances for the senior Colombia national football team, including 10 qualifying matches for the FIFA World Cup. He also played at the 1992 Summer Olympics.

Pacheco also played for Colombia at the 1989 FIFA U-16 World Championship.
