= Edgardo Di Meola =

Argentine footballer

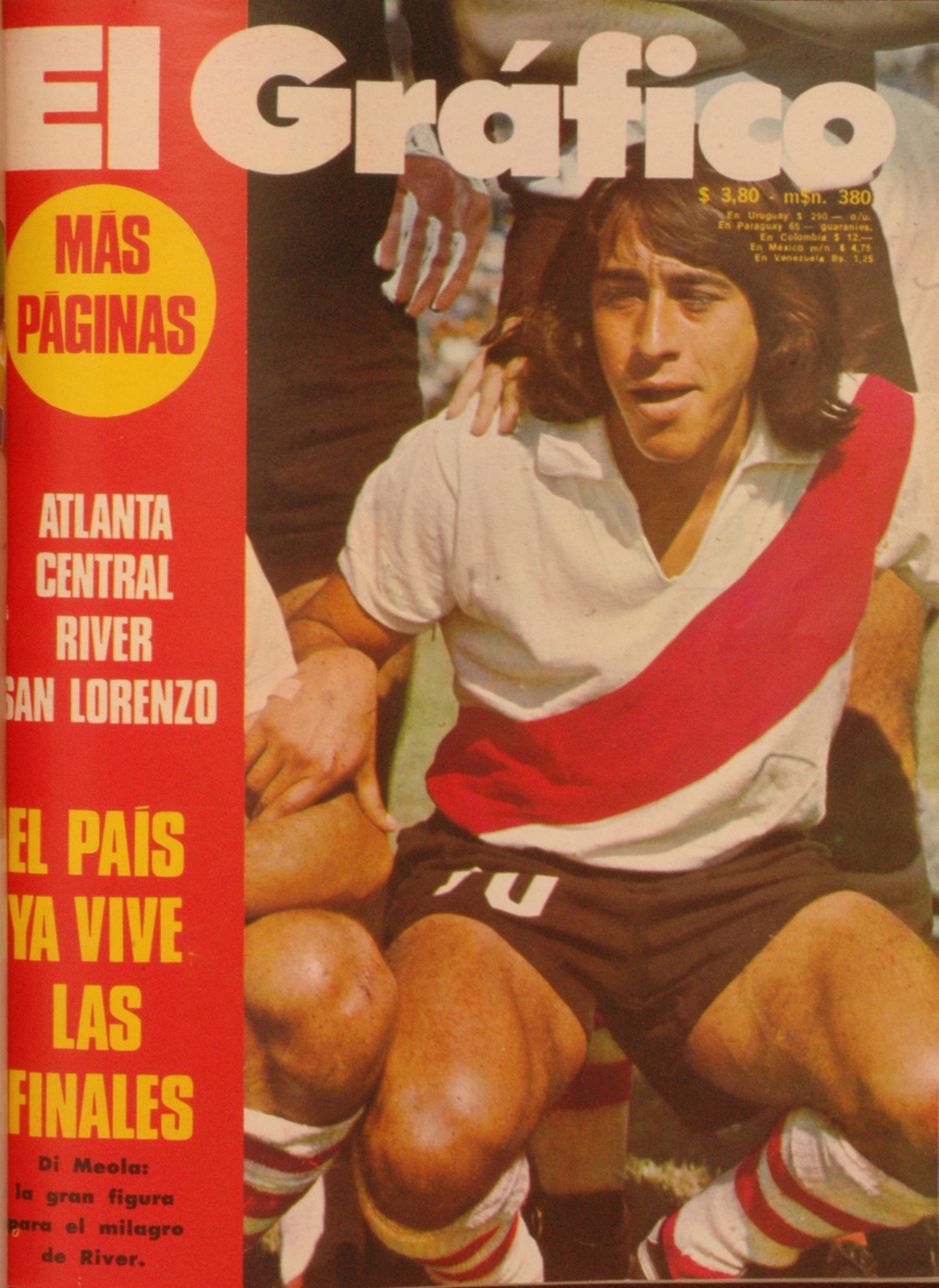
- El Grafico of 18 December 1973.

Personal information
- Date of birth: 23 September 1950
- Date of death: 16 November 2005 (aged 55)
- Position: Forward

Senior career*
Years	Team	Apps	(Gls)
- Colón de Santa Fe
- * Club domestic league appearances and goals

Edgardo Di Meola (23 September 1950 – 16 November 2005) was an Argentine footballer who played as a forward.
