= Javier Castrilli =

Argentine football referee

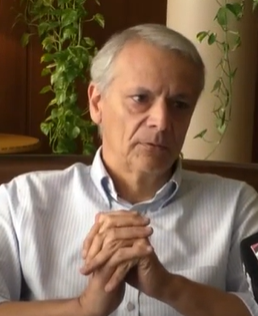
- Castrilli in 2019
- Born: 22 May 1957 (age 69); Buenos Aires, Argentina

Domestic
| Years | League | Role |
| 1980-1998 | LPF | Referee |

International
| Years | League | Role |
| 1998 | FIFA listed | Referee |

Javier Alberto Castrilli (born May 22, 1957) is a former international football referee and politician from Buenos Aires, Argentina.

== Refereeing career ==
Castrilli worked as a referee from 1980 to 1998, earning the nickname El Sheriff due to his character and decisions on the field by strictly imposing the rules of the game. Castrilli was notorious for officiating a league match between River Plate and Newell's Old Boys in May 1992. He issued four red cards to River Plate players, and also issued a red card to the club's manager Daniel Passarella.

He was a referee in the 1998 World Cup held in France and retired in the same year.

After his retirement, Castrilli served as head of the Referees Committee of the National Professional Football Association of Chile (ANFP) from September 2021 until April 2022. On 13 June 2025, he assumed the same charge in the National Amateur Football Association of Chile (ANFA).

== Political career ==
Castrilli entered politics and is director the Argentine Ministry of Internal Affairs' program of security at football events (ProSEF). He ran for mayor of Buenos Aires in 2011, landing in ninth place with under 1% of the vote.
