= Jaime Morón =

Colombian footballer (1950–2005)

Personal information
- Full name: Jaime Morón León
- Date of birth: 16 November 1950
- Place of birth: Cartagena, Colombia
- Date of death: 2 December 2005 (aged 55)
- Place of death: Bogotá, Colombia
- Height: 1.72 m (5 ft 7 1/2 in)
- Position: Forward

Senior career*
Years	Team	Apps	(Gls)
- Millonarios
- * Club domestic league appearances and goals

Jaime Morón (16 November 1950 – 2 December 2005) was a Colombian footballer who competed in the 1972 Summer Olympics.
