= Gerardo Moncada (footballer) =

Colombian footballer (born 1949)

Personal information
- Date of birth: 27 May 1949 (age 77)
- Position: Defender

Senior career*
Years	Team	Apps	(Gls)
- Atlético Nacional
- * Club domestic league appearances and goals

Gerardo Moncada (born 27 May 1949) is a Colombian former footballer who competed in the 1972 Summer Olympics.
