= 2020 CONMEBOL Pre-Olympic Tournament squads =

List of players participating in the 2020 CONMEBOL Pre-Olympic Tournament

The 2020 CONMEBOL Pre-Olympic Tournament was an international association football tournament held in Colombia from 18 January to 9 February 2020. The ten national teams involved in the tournament were required to register a squad of 23 players; only players in these squads are eligible to take part in the tournament.

As the tournament will not held during the FIFA International Match Calendar, clubs were not obligated to release the players.

All registered players had to have been born on or after 1 January 1997. The age listed for each player is on 18 January 2020, the first day of the tournament. Players marked in bold have been capped at full International level.

On 10 January 2020, CONMEBOL published the lists of the ten teams.

== Group A ==
=== Colombia ===
Head coach: Arturo Reyes

The 23-man squad was announced on 27 December 2019. On 13 January 2020, midfielder Juan Pablo Ramírez was replaced by Johan Carbonero due to an injury.

No.	Pos.	Player	Date of birth (age)	Club
1	GK	Esteban Ruiz	15 July 1997 (aged 22)	(Colombian Football Federation) Independiente Medellín
2	DF	Eddie Segura	2 February 1997 (aged 22)	(United States Soccer Federation) Los Angeles FC
3	DF	Andrés Reyes	8 September 1999 (aged 20)	(Colombian Football Federation) Atlético Nacional
4	DF	Willer Ditta	23 January 1997 (aged 22)	(Colombian Football Federation) Junior
5	MF	Kevin Balanta	28 April 1997 (aged 22)	(Mexican Football Federation) Tijuana
6	MF	Andrés Balanta	18 January 2000 (aged 20)	(Colombian Football Federation) Deportivo Cali
7	FW	Iván Angulo	22 March 1999 (aged 20)	(Brazilian Football Confederation) Palmeiras
8	FW	Jorge Carrascal	25 May 1998 (aged 21)	(Argentine Football Association) River Plate
9	FW	Ricardo Márquez	9 November 1997 (aged 22)	(Colombian Football Federation) Unión Magdalena
10	MF	Nicolás Benedetti	25 April 1997 (aged 22)	(Mexican Football Federation) América
11	FW	Ménder García	28 October 1998 (aged 21)	(Colombian Football Federation) Once Caldas
12	GK	Kevin Mier	18 May 2000 (aged 19)	(Colombian Football Federation) Santa Fe
13	DF	Álvaro Angulo	6 March 1997 (aged 22)	(Colombian Football Federation) Águilas Doradas
14	DF	Anderson Arroyo	27 September 1999 (aged 20)	(Football Association of the Czech Republic) Mladá Boleslav
15	MF	Jaime Alvarado	26 July 1999 (aged 20)	(Royal Spanish Football Federation) Hércules
16	DF	Edwin Herrera	2 September 1998 (aged 21)	(Colombian Football Federation) Santa Fe
17	DF	Gabriel Fuentes	9 February 1997 (aged 22)	(Colombian Football Federation) Junior
18	FW	Edwuin Cetré	1 January 1998 (aged 22)	(Colombian Football Federation) Junior
19	FW	Luis Sandoval	1 June 1999 (aged 20)	(Colombian Football Federation) Junior
20	MF	Eduard Atuesta	18 June 1997 (aged 22)	(United States Soccer Federation) Los Angeles FC
21	MF	Johan Carbonero	20 July 1999 (aged 20)	(Colombian Football Federation) Once Caldas
22	GK	Sebastián Guerra	8 January 2001 (aged 19)	(Colombian Football Federation) Atlético Nacional
23	DF	Carlos Terán	24 September 2000 (aged 19)	(Colombian Football Federation) Envigado

=== Chile ===
Head coach: (Colombia) Bernardo Redín

The 23-man squad was announced on 27 December 2019.

No.	Pos.	Player	Date of birth (age)	Club
1	GK	Omar Carabalí	12 June 1997 (aged 22)	(Football Federation of Chile) Colo-Colo
2	DF	Nicolás Fernández	3 August 1999 (aged 20)	(Football Federation of Chile) Audax Italiano
3	MF	Adrián Cuadra	23 October 1997 (aged 22)	(Football Federation of Chile) Santiago Wanderers
4	DF	Sebastián Cabrera	16 March 1998 (aged 21)	(Football Federation of Chile) Palestino
5	DF	**Nicolás Díaz**	20 May 1999 (aged 20)	(Football Federation of Chile) Palestino
6	DF	Nicolás Ramírez	1 May 1997 (aged 22)	(Football Federation of Chile) Huachipato
7	FW	**Iván Morales**	29 July 1999 (aged 20)	(Football Federation of Chile) Colo-Colo
8	MF	**Pablo Aránguiz**	17 March 1997 (aged 22)	(Football Federation of Chile) Unión Española
9	FW	Nicolás Guerra	9 January 1999 (aged 21)	(Football Federation of Chile) Universidad de Chile
10	MF	**Ángelo Araos**	6 January 1997 (aged 23)	(Brazilian Football Confederation) Corinthians
11	FW	Ignacio Jara	28 January 1997 (aged 22)	(Football Federation of Chile) Cobreloa
12	GK	Luis Ureta	8 March 1999 (aged 20)	(Football Federation of Chile) O'Higgins
13	MF	Camilo Moya	19 March 1998 (aged 21)	(Football Federation of Chile) Universidad de Chile
14	MF	**Tomás Alarcón**	19 January 1999 (aged 20)	(Football Federation of Chile) O'Higgins
15	DF	Raimundo Rebolledo	14 May 1997 (aged 22)	(Football Federation of Chile) Universidad Católica
16	FW	**Diego Valencia**	14 January 2000 (aged 20)	(Football Federation of Chile) Universidad Católica
17	MF	**Gabriel Suazo**	9 August 1997 (aged 22)	(Football Federation of Chile) Colo-Colo
18	FW	Matías Cavalleri	8 April 1998 (aged 21)	(Football Federation of Chile) Curicó Unido
19	DF	Benjamín Gazzolo	14 July 1997 (aged 22)	(Football Federation of Chile) Huachipato
20	DF	**Alex Ibacache**	11 January 1999 (aged 21)	(Football Federation of Chile) Everton
21	DF	Thomas Galdames	20 November 1998 (aged 21)	(Football Federation of Chile) Unión Española
22	FW	Franco Lobos	22 February 1999 (aged 20)	(Football Federation of Chile) Universidad de Chile
23	GK	Julio Fierro	9 April 2002 (aged 17)	(Football Federation of Chile) Colo-Colo

=== Venezuela ===
Head coach: Amleto Bonaccorso

The 23-man squad was announced on 31 December 2019. On 6 January 2020, Miguel Silva replaced goalkeeper Joel Graterol who was not released by his team América de Cali. On 16 January, Brayan Palmezano was replaced by Yeferson Soteldo due to an injury.

No.	Pos.	Player	Date of birth (age)	Club
1	GK	Miguel Silva	9 July 2000 (aged 19)	(United States Soccer Federation) New York Red Bulls II
2	DF	Pablo Bonilla	2 December 1999 (aged 20)	(Venezuelan Football Federation) Deportivo La Guaira
3	DF	Williams Velázquez	22 April 1997 (aged 22)	(The Football Association) Watford
4	DF	**Josua Mejías**	9 June 1997 (aged 22)	(Royal Spanish Football Federation) Atlético Madrid
5	DF	Jean Fuentes	7 February 1997 (aged 22)	(Venezuelan Football Federation) Deportivo La Guaira
6	DF	**Miguel Navarro**	26 February 1999 (aged 20)	(Venezuelan Football Federation) Deportivo La Guaira
7	FW	Jesús Vargas	26 August 1999 (aged 20)	(Argentine Football Association) Gimnasia y Esgrima La Plata
8	MF	Cristhian Rivas	20 January 1997 (aged 22)	(Venezuelan Football Federation) Estudiantes de Mérida
9	FW	José Alejandro Rivas	13 September 1998 (aged 21)	(Venezuelan Football Federation) Trujillanos
10	MF	Daniel Saggiomo	7 February 1998 (aged 21)	(Venezuelan Football Federation) Caracas
11	MF	**Yeferson Soteldo**	30 June 1997 (aged 22)	(Brazilian Football Confederation) Santos
12	GK	Cristopher Varela	27 November 1999 (aged 20)	(Venezuelan Football Federation) Deportivo Táchira
13	DF	Rommell Ibarra	24 March 2000 (aged 19)	(Venezuelan Football Federation) Deportivo La Guaira
14	FW	Jhon Marchán	2 September 1998 (aged 21)	(Venezuelan Football Federation) Portuguesa
15	MF	Matías Lacava	24 October 2002 (aged 17)	(Venezuelan Football Federation) Academia Puerto Cabello
16	MF	Christian Larotonda	26 May 1999 (aged 20)	(Venezuelan Football Federation) Metropolitanos
17	FW	**Jan Carlos Hurtado**	5 March 2000 (aged 19)	(Argentine Football Association) Boca Juniors
18	MF	Anderson Contreras	30 March 2001 (aged 18)	(Venezuelan Football Federation) Caracas
19	FW	Jholvis Acevedo	2 October 1998 (aged 21)	(Venezuelan Football Federation) Metropolitanos
20	MF	Aitor López	4 June 1999 (aged 20)	(Venezuelan Football Federation) Estudiantes de Caracas
21	DF	Sandro Notaroberto	10 March 1998 (aged 21)	(Venezuelan Football Federation) Estudiantes de Caracas
22	GK	Wilbert Hernández	2 March 2001 (aged 18)	(Venezuelan Football Federation) Caracas
23	MF	**Cristian Cásseres Jr.**	20 January 2000 (aged 19)	(United States Soccer Federation) New York Red Bulls

=== Ecuador ===
Head coach: (Argentina) Jorge Célico

The 23-man squad was announced on 23 December 2019. On 10 January 2020, Johan Mina replaced midfielder Jhojan Julio due to an injury. On 12 January, it was announced that the squad was reduced to 22 players because midfielder Jonathan Perlaza was not released by his new team Querétaro.

No.	Pos.	Player	Date of birth (age)	Club
1	GK	**Wellington Ramírez**	9 September 2000 (aged 19)	(Royal Spanish Football Federation) Real Sociedad B
2	DF	**Jackson Porozo**	4 August 2000 (aged 19)	(Brazilian Football Confederation) Santos
3	DF	**Luis Segovia**	26 October 1997 (aged 22)	(Ecuadorian Football Federation) Independiente del Valle
4	DF	Anthony Landázuri	19 April 1997 (aged 22)	(Ecuadorian Football Federation) Independiente del Valle
5	MF	**Jordy Alcívar**	5 August 1999 (aged 20)	(Ecuadorian Football Federation) LDU Quito
6	DF	**Gustavo Vallecilla**	28 May 1999 (aged 20)	(Ecuadorian Football Federation) Aucas
7	MF	Jhon Sánchez	30 July 1999 (aged 20)	(Ecuadorian Football Federation) Independiente del Valle
8	MF	**José Cifuentes**	12 March 1999 (aged 20)	(Ecuadorian Football Federation) Universidad Católica
9	FW	**Leonardo Campana**	24 July 2000 (aged 19)	(Ecuadorian Football Federation) Barcelona
10	MF	Jordan Rezabala	29 February 2000 (aged 19)	(Mexican Football Federation) Tijuana
11	FW	Alexander Bolaños	12 December 1999 (aged 20)	(Ecuadorian Football Federation) Club Águilas
12	GK	Álvaro Preciado	20 November 1997 (aged 22)	(Ecuadorian Football Federation) Delfín
13	DF	Bryan Rivera	26 February 1997 (aged 22)	(Ecuadorian Football Federation) Independiente del Valle
14	MF	Renny Cabezas	15 May 1998 (aged 21)	(Ecuadorian Football Federation) Guayaquil City
15	DF	Gustavo Cortez	11 October 1997 (aged 22)	(Ecuadorian Football Federation) Universidad Católica
16	MF	Sergio Quintero	12 March 1999 (aged 20)	(Ecuadorian Football Federation) Imbabura
18	FW	Johan Mina	15 May 2002 (aged 17)	(Ecuadorian Football Federation) Emelec
19	MF	**Freddy Mina**	24 July 1998 (aged 21)	(Ecuadorian Football Federation) Macará
20	FW	**Alejandro Cabeza**	11 March 1997 (aged 22)	(Ecuadorian Football Federation) Independiente del Valle
21	MF	**Alan Franco**	21 August 1998 (aged 21)	(Ecuadorian Football Federation) Independiente del Valle
22	GK	Leodán Chalá	25 January 1998 (aged 21)	(Ecuadorian Football Federation) El Nacional
23	FW	Wilter Ayoví	17 April 1997 (aged 22)	(Ecuadorian Football Federation) Independiente del Valle

=== Argentina ===
Head coach: Fernando Batista

The 22-man squad was announced on 15 December 2019. On 4 January 2020, a 23-man final squad was announced with some modifications. Facundo Mura was added to the squad whilst Lucas Robertone withdrew injured and was replaced by Gastón Togni, moreover, Maximiliano Centurión and Nazareno Colombo were called up to replace Leonel Mosevich and Lautaro Valenti who were not released by their teams Nacional and Lanús respectively. On 15 January, Carlos Valenzuela was replaced by Juan Brunetta due to an injury.

No.	Pos.	Player	Date of birth (age)	Club
1	GK	**Facundo Cambeses**	9 April 1997 (aged 22)	(Argentine Football Association) Banfield
2	DF	Nehuén Pérez (captain)	24 June 2000 (aged 19)	(Portuguese Football Federation) Famalicão
3	DF	Claudio Bravo	13 March 1997 (aged 22)	(Argentine Football Association) Banfield
4	DF	Marcelo Herrera	3 November 1998 (aged 21)	(Argentine Football Association) San Lorenzo
5	MF	Fausto Vera	26 March 2000 (aged 19)	(Argentine Football Association) Argentinos Juniors
6	DF	Nazareno Colombo	20 March 1999 (aged 20)	(Argentine Football Association) Estudiantes de La Plata
7	MF	Juan Brunetta	12 May 1997 (aged 22)	(Argentine Football Association) Godoy Cruz
8	MF	Nicolás Capaldo	14 September 1998 (aged 21)	(Argentine Football Association) Boca Juniors
9	FW	Adolfo Gaich	26 February 1999 (aged 20)	(Argentine Football Association) San Lorenzo
10	MF	**Alexis Mac Allister**	24 December 1998 (aged 21)	(Argentine Football Association) Boca Juniors
11	MF	Matías Zaracho	10 March 1998 (aged 21)	(Argentine Football Association) Racing
12	GK	Juan Pablo Cozzani	9 October 1998 (aged 21)	(Argentine Football Association) Lanús
13	GK	Joaquín Blázquez	28 January 2001 (aged 18)	(Royal Spanish Football Federation) Valencia
14	DF	**Facundo Medina**	28 May 1999 (aged 20)	(Argentine Football Association) Talleres de Córdoba
15	DF	Maximiliano Centurión	20 February 1999 (aged 20)	(Argentine Football Association) Argentinos Juniors
16	DF	Hernán de la Fuente	7 January 1997 (aged 23)	(Argentine Football Association) Vélez Sarsfield
17	MF	Tomás Belmonte	27 May 1998 (aged 21)	(Argentine Football Association) Lanús
18	MF	Gastón Togni	20 September 1997 (aged 22)	(Argentine Football Association) Independiente
19	FW	Nahuel Bustos	4 July 1998 (aged 21)	(Argentine Football Association) Talleres de Córdoba
20	FW	**Julián Álvarez**	31 January 2000 (aged 19)	(Argentine Football Association) River Plate
21	FW	**Valentín Castellanos**	3 October 1998 (aged 21)	(United States Soccer Federation) New York City FC
22	FW	Agustín Urzi	4 May 2000 (aged 19)	(Argentine Football Association) Banfield
23	DF	Facundo Mura	24 March 1999 (aged 20)	(Argentine Football Association) Estudiantes de La Plata

== Group B ==
=== Brazil ===
Head coach: André Jardine

The 23-man squad was announced on 16 December 2019. On 27 December, Douglas Luiz, Gabriel Martinelli, Emerson Royal, Gabriel Magalhães and Wendel were replaced by Douglas Augusto, Bruno Tabata, Dodô, Nino and Pepê respectively. Three other changes to the squad were announced on 3 January 2020, Douglas Augusto, Ayrton Lucas and Roger Ibañez were replaced by Maycon, Iago and Bruno Fuchs respectively. All these modifications were made because the replaced players were not allowed by their teams to take part in the tournament. On 16 January, Walce was replaced by Ricardo Graça due to an injury.

No.	Pos.	Player	Date of birth (age)	Club
1	GK	Ivan	2 July 1997 (aged 22)	(Brazilian Football Confederation) Ponte Preta
2	DF	Guga	29 August 1998 (aged 21)	(Brazilian Football Confederation) Atlético Mineiro
3	DF	Ricardo Graça	16 February 1997 (aged 22)	(Brazilian Football Confederation) Vasco da Gama
4	DF	Robson Bambu	12 November 1997 (aged 22)	(Brazilian Football Confederation) Athletico Paranaense
5	MF	**Bruno Guimarães**	16 November 1997 (aged 22)	(Brazilian Football Confederation) Athletico Paranaense
6	DF	Caio Henrique	31 July 1997 (aged 22)	(Brazilian Football Confederation) Fluminense
7	FW	Paulinho	15 July 2000 (aged 19)	(German Football Association) Bayer Leverkusen
8	MF	Matheus Henrique	19 December 1997 (aged 22)	(Brazilian Football Confederation) Grêmio
9	FW	**Matheus Cunha**	27 May 1999 (aged 20)	(German Football Association) RB Leipzig
10	FW	Pedrinho	13 April 1998 (aged 21)	(Brazilian Football Confederation) Corinthians
11	FW	**Antony**	24 February 2000 (aged 19)	(Brazilian Football Confederation) São Paulo
12	GK	Cleiton	19 August 1997 (aged 22)	(Brazilian Football Confederation) Atlético Mineiro
13	DF	Nino	10 April 1997 (aged 22)	(Brazilian Football Confederation) Fluminense
14	DF	Bruno Fuchs	1 April 1999 (aged 20)	(Brazilian Football Confederation) Internacional
15	MF	Maycon	15 July 1997 (aged 22)	(Ukrainian Association of Football) Shakhtar Donetsk
16	DF	Iago	23 March 1997 (aged 22)	(German Football Association) Augsburg
17	FW	Pepê	24 February 1997 (aged 22)	(Brazilian Football Confederation) Grêmio
18	MF	Igor Gomes	17 March 1999 (aged 20)	(Brazilian Football Confederation) São Paulo
19	MF	Reinier	19 January 2002 (aged 17)	(Brazilian Football Confederation) Flamengo
20	DF	Dodô	17 November 1998 (aged 21)	(Ukrainian Association of Football) Shakhtar Donetsk
21	FW	Bruno Tabata	30 March 1997 (aged 22)	(Portuguese Football Federation) Portimonense
22	GK	Phelipe	8 February 1999 (aged 20)	(Brazilian Football Confederation) Grêmio
23	FW	Yuri Alberto	18 March 2001 (aged 18)	(Brazilian Football Confederation) Santos

=== Paraguay ===
Head coach: (Argentina) Ernesto Marcucci

The 23-man squad was announced on 27 December 2019. On 3 January 2020, Sergio Bareiro was called up to replace Sebastián Ferreira who was not released by his team Monarcas Morelia.

No.	Pos.	Player	Date of birth (age)	Club
1	GK	Marino Arzamendia	19 January 1998 (aged 21)	(Paraguayan Football Association) Sportivo Luqueño
2	DF	Rodi Ferreira	29 May 1998 (aged 21)	(Paraguayan Football Association) Nacional
3	DF	Roberto Fernández	7 June 2000 (aged 19)	(Paraguayan Football Association) Guaraní
4	DF	Matías Espinoza	19 September 1997 (aged 22)	(Paraguayan Football Association) Libertad
5	DF	Saúl Salcedo (captain)	29 August 1997 (aged 22)	(Argentine Football Association) Huracán
6	MF	Cristian Núñez	20 September 1997 (aged 22)	(Argentine Football Association) Vélez Sarsfield
7	MF	**Mathías Villasanti**	24 January 1997 (aged 22)	(Paraguayan Football Association) Cerro Porteño
8	MF	**Jorge Morel**	22 January 1998 (aged 21)	(Paraguayan Football Association) Guaraní
9	FW	Sergio Bareiro	4 November 1998 (aged 21)	(Paraguayan Football Association) General Díaz
10	MF	Sergio Díaz	5 March 1998 (aged 21)	(Paraguayan Football Association) Cerro Porteño
11	FW	**Jesús Medina**	30 April 1997 (aged 22)	(United States Soccer Federation) New York City FC
12	GK	Miguel Martínez	29 September 1998 (aged 21)	(Paraguayan Football Association) General Díaz
13	DF	Pablo Meza	29 January 1997 (aged 22)	(Paraguayan Football Association) General Díaz
14	DF	Enzo Giménez	17 February 1998 (aged 21)	(Paraguayan Football Association) General Díaz
15	MF	**Braian Ojeda**	27 June 2000 (aged 19)	(Argentine Football Association) Defensa y Justicia
16	MF	Cristhian Paredes	18 May 1998 (aged 21)	(United States Soccer Federation) Portland Timbers
17	DF	**Santiago Arzamendia**	5 May 1997 (aged 22)	(Paraguayan Football Association) Cerro Porteño
18	FW	Iván Franco	16 April 2000 (aged 19)	(Paraguayan Football Association) Libertad
19	FW	Blas Armoa	3 February 2000 (aged 19)	(Paraguayan Football Association) Sportivo Luqueño
20	FW	Hugo Fernández	2 December 1997 (aged 22)	(Paraguayan Football Association) Olimpia
21	MF	Hugo Martínez	27 April 2000 (aged 19)	(Paraguayan Football Association) Libertad
22	GK	Luis Franco	10 April 1999 (aged 20)	(Paraguayan Football Association) Sol de América
23	FW	Erik López	27 November 2001 (aged 18)	(Paraguayan Football Association) Olimpia

=== Bolivia ===
Head coach: (Venezuela) César Farías

The 23-man squad was announced on 7 January 2020.

No.	Pos.	Player	Date of birth (age)	Club
1	GK	**Rubén Cordano**	16 October 1998 (aged 21)	(Bolivian Football Federation) Blooming
2	DF	Sebastián Reyes	12 March 1997 (aged 22)	(Bolivian Football Federation) Jorge Wilstermann
3	DF	Wálter Antelo	9 October 2000 (aged 19)	(Bolivian Football Federation) Sport Boys Warnes
4	DF	**Jairo Quinteros**	7 February 2001 (aged 18)	(Royal Spanish Football Federation) Valencia B
5	DF	**José María Carrasco**	16 August 1997 (aged 22)	(Bolivian Football Federation) Blooming
6	DF	**Antonio Bustamante**	20 June 1997 (aged 22)	(United States Soccer Federation) D.C. United
7	MF	**John García**	13 April 2000 (aged 19)	(Bolivian Football Federation) Oriente Petrolero
8	MF	**Moisés Villarroel**	7 September 1998 (aged 21)	(Bolivian Football Federation) Jorge Wilstermann
9	FW	**César Menacho**	9 August 1999 (aged 20)	(Bolivian Football Federation) Blooming
10	MF	**Henry Vaca**	27 January 1998 (aged 21)	(Peruvian Football Federation) Universitario
11	FW	**Bruno Miranda**	10 February 1998 (aged 21)	(Bolivian Football Federation) Royal Pari
12	GK	John Jairo Cuéllar	15 October 1999 (aged 20)	(Bolivian Football Federation) Guabirá
13	MF	Moisés Calero	12 September 1998 (aged 21)	(Bolivian Football Federation) The Strongest
14	MF	**Franz Gonzales**	26 June 2000 (aged 19)	(Bolivian Football Federation) Sport Boys Warnes
15	DF	Rodrigo Cabrera	6 February 1997 (aged 22)	(Bolivian Football Federation) Royal Pari
16	DF	Alex Arano	14 March 1998 (aged 21)	(Bolivian Football Federation) Blooming
17	DF	**Roberto Fernández**	12 July 1999 (aged 20)	(Bolivian Football Federation) Bolívar
18	FW	**Fernando Saldías**	27 February 1997 (aged 22)	(Bolivian Football Federation) Oriente Petrolero
19	FW	**Víctor Abrego**	11 February 1997 (aged 22)	(Bolivian Football Federation) Destroyers
20	MF	Robert Cueto	27 May 1999 (aged 20)	(Bolivian Football Federation) Blooming
21	MF	**Ronaldo Sánchez**	24 April 1997 (aged 22)	(Bolivian Football Federation) Oriente Petrolero
22	FW	Layonel Figueroa	6 July 1999 (aged 20)	(Bolivian Football Federation) Royal Pari
23	GK	Leonardo Claros	4 March 1998 (aged 21)	(Bolivian Football Federation) Always Ready

=== Uruguay ===
Head coach: Gustavo Ferreyra

The 23-man squad was announced on 29 December 2019. On 10 January 2020, defender Emiliano Ancheta was replaced by Jonathan González due to an injury.

No.	Pos.	Player	Date of birth (age)	Club
1	GK	Cristopher Fiermarin	1 January 1998 (aged 22)	(Uruguayan Football Association) Torque
2	DF	Santiago Bueno	9 November 1998 (aged 21)	(Royal Spanish Football Federation) Girona
3	DF	Sebastián Cáceres	18 August 1999 (aged 20)	(Uruguayan Football Association) Liverpool
4	DF	José Luis Rodríguez	14 March 1997 (aged 22)	(Argentine Football Association) Racing
5	MF	**Manuel Ugarte**	11 April 2001 (aged 18)	(Uruguayan Football Association) Fénix
6	DF	Maximiliano Araújo	15 February 2000 (aged 19)	(Mexican Football Federation) Puebla
7	FW	Matías Arezo	21 November 2002 (aged 17)	(Uruguayan Football Association) River Plate
8	MF	Carlos Benavídez	30 March 1998 (aged 21)	(Argentine Football Association) Independiente
9	FW	**Diego Rossi**	5 March 1998 (aged 21)	(United States Soccer Federation) Los Angeles FC
10	MF	Santiago Rodríguez	8 January 2000 (aged 20)	(Uruguayan Football Association) Nacional
11	FW	Ignacio Ramírez	1 February 1997 (aged 22)	(Uruguayan Football Association) Liverpool
12	GK	Ignacio De Arruabarrena	16 January 1997 (aged 23)	(Uruguayan Football Association) Montevideo Wanderers
13	DF	Jonathan González	22 June 2000 (aged 19)	(Uruguayan Football Association) Defensor Sporting
14	MF	Francisco Ginella	21 January 1999 (aged 20)	(United States Soccer Federation) Los Angeles FC
15	MF	Facundo Waller (captain)	9 April 1997 (aged 22)	(Uruguayan Football Association) Plaza Colonia
16	MF	Nicolás Acevedo	14 April 1999 (aged 20)	(Uruguayan Football Association) Liverpool
17	DF	Emanuel Gularte	30 September 1997 (aged 22)	(Uruguayan Football Association) Progreso
18	MF	Juan Manuel Sanabria	29 March 2000 (aged 19)	(Royal Spanish Football Federation) Atlético Madrid
19	MF	**Joaquín Piquerez**	24 August 1998 (aged 21)	(Uruguayan Football Association) River Plate
20	FW	Federico Viñas	30 June 1998 (aged 21)	(Mexican Football Federation) América
21	DF	Agustín Oliveros	17 August 1998 (aged 21)	(Uruguayan Football Association) Racing
22	DF	Mathías Laborda	15 September 1999 (aged 20)	(Uruguayan Football Association) Nacional
23	GK	Rodrigo Formento	25 September 1999 (aged 20)	(Uruguayan Football Association) Cerro

=== Peru ===
Head coach: Nolberto Solano

The 23-man squad was announced on 3 January 2020. On 15 January, Kluivert Aguilar was called up to replace Franco Medina who withdrew injured.

No.	Pos.	Player	Date of birth (age)	Club
1	GK	Pedro Ynamine	14 October 1998 (aged 21)	(Peruvian Football Federation) Universidad San Martín
2	DF	Marco Saravia	6 February 1999 (aged 20)	(Peruvian Football Federation) Unión Huaral
3	DF	Eduardo Caballero	31 March 1997 (aged 22)	(Peruvian Football Federation) Deportivo Municipal
4	DF	**Gianfranco Chávez** (captain)	10 August 1998 (aged 21)	(Peruvian Football Federation) Sporting Cristal
5	DF	Eduardo Rabanal	30 January 1997 (aged 22)	(Peruvian Football Federation) Deportivo Municipal
6	DF	José Luján	12 January 1997 (aged 23)	(Peruvian Football Federation) Universidad San Martín
7	MF	**Yuriel Celi**	20 February 2002 (aged 17)	(Peruvian Football Federation) Cantolao
8	MF	**Jairo Concha**	27 May 1999 (aged 20)	(Peruvian Football Federation) Universidad San Martín
9	FW	Christopher Olivares	3 April 1999 (aged 20)	(Peruvian Football Federation) Sporting Cristal
10	FW	**Fernando Pacheco**	26 June 1999 (aged 20)	(Peruvian Football Federation) Sporting Cristal
11	FW	Sebastián Gonzales	6 December 1999 (aged 20)	(Peruvian Football Federation) Sport Boys
12	GK	Renato Solís	28 January 1998 (aged 21)	(Peruvian Football Federation) Sporting Cristal
13	DF	Dylan Caro	23 March 1999 (aged 20)	(Peruvian Football Federation) Alianza Lima
14	MF	Jordan Guivin	23 February 1998 (aged 21)	(Peruvian Football Federation) Universidad San Martín
15	DF	**Marcos López**	20 November 1999 (aged 20)	(United States Soccer Federation) San Jose Earthquakes
16	MF	**Jesús Pretell**	26 March 1999 (aged 20)	(Peruvian Football Federation) Sporting Cristal
17	FW	Luis Carranza	18 August 1998 (aged 21)	(Peruvian Football Federation) Ayacucho
18	FW	José Rivera	8 May 1997 (aged 22)	(Peruvian Football Federation) Unión Comercio
19	MF	Jorge Murrugarra	22 March 1997 (aged 22)	(Peruvian Football Federation) UTC
20	MF	Aldair Fuentes	25 April 1998 (aged 21)	(Peruvian Football Federation) Alianza Lima
21	GK	Ángel Zamudio	21 April 1997 (aged 22)	(Peruvian Football Federation) Unión Comercio
22	DF	Kluivert Aguilar	5 May 2003 (aged 16)	(Peruvian Football Federation) Alianza Lima
23	FW	Kevin Sandoval	3 May 1997 (aged 22)	(Peruvian Football Federation) Sporting Cristal
