= 2021–22 Manchester City F.C. season =

English football club season

Manchester City
2021–22 season
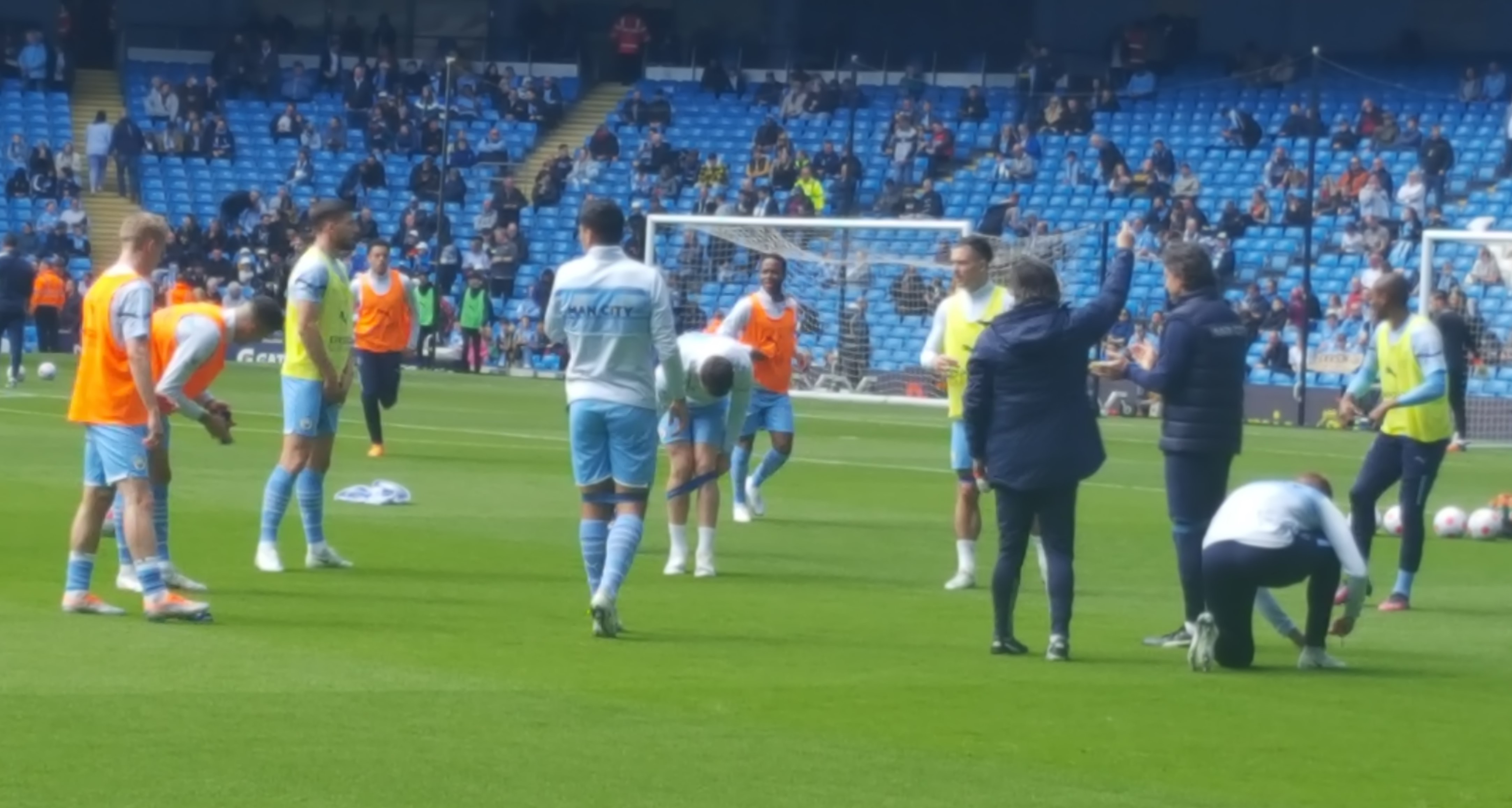
- Manchester City players warming up for their Premier League match against Watford, 23 April 2022
- Owner: City Football Group
- Chairman: Khaldoon Al Mubarak
- Manager: Pep Guardiola
- Stadium: City of Manchester Stadium
- Premier League: 1st
- FA Cup: Semi-finals
- EFL Cup: Fourth round
- FA Community Shield: Runners-up
- UEFA Champions League: Semi-finals
- Top goalscorer: League: Kevin De Bruyne (15); All: Riyad Mahrez (24)
- Highest home attendance: 53,400 vs Fulham, FA Cup, 5 February 2022
- Lowest home attendance: 30,959 vs Wycombe Wanderers, EFL Cup, 21 September 2021
- Average home league attendance: 52,889
- Biggest win: 7–0 vs Leeds United (H), Premier League, 14 December 2021
- Biggest defeat: 0–2 vs Paris Saint-Germain (A), Champions League, 28 September 2021; 0–2 vs Crystal Palace (H), Premier League, 30 October 2021; 1–3 (a.e.t.) vs Real Madrid (A), Champions League, 4 May 2022
Home colours	Away colours	Third colours

The 2021–22 season was the 120th season in the existence of Manchester City Football Club and their 20th consecutive season in the top flight of English football. In addition to the domestic league, Manchester City also participated in this season's editions of the FA Cup, EFL Cup, Community Shield and UEFA Champions League.

The club kicked off the season by losing the Community Shield to Leicester City and was later knocked out of the EFL Cup by West Ham United in the fourth round, ending their unbeaten streak in the competition that had stretched to nearly five years. City also reached the FA Cup semi-finals for the fifth time in Guardiola's six-season tenure, but were beaten by Liverpool, the Blues' third consecutive semi-final defeat. In Europe, City were coming off their most successful Champions League campaign in history and looked to improve on last season's final loss to Chelsea. They reached the semi-finals again, but were defeated there by Real Madrid 6–5 on aggregate after extra time over the two closely fought and very dramatic games. On a brighter note, City successfully retained the Premier League title in another intense title race with Liverpool. This was the second time the Blues managed to defend the trophy (both under Pep Guardiola) and their fourth title in five years. City secured the league title by a single point on the final matchday with a dramatic 3–2 comeback victory over Aston Villa. The second-half turnaround bore striking similarities to City's title-clinching game from the 2011–12 Premier League season, exactly ten seasons earlier.

The season was Manchester City's first since 2010–11 not to feature their all-time record goalscorer Sergio Agüero, who had left the club for Barcelona on a free transfer at the end of the previous season; he went on to retire from football following cardiac health problems in November 2021. City were unable to immediately recruit a like-for-like replacement for Agüero, and this season was notable for Guardiola's extensive use of a false 9 role. Agüero's departure proved to be no impediment to the Blues scoring 150 goals in all competitions, the most of any senior top-tier professional team in Europe; they were closely followed by Liverpool with 147 goals, although Jürgen Klopp's side played six more matches.

== Kits ==
Supplier: Puma / Sponsor: Etihad Airways (Front) / Nexen Tire (Sleeves)

Home	Home alternate (Note: Used on match week 6 against Chelsea.)	Away	Away alternate	Third

== Season summary ==
=== Pre-season ===
Euro 2020 began with 15 Manchester City first team players selected in the qualified squads, which was the joint-most representatives from a single club (shared with Chelsea). However, Joao Cancelo was forced to withdraw days after the tournament began due to a positive SARS‑CoV‑2 test result, and Eric Garcia joined Barcelona while the tournament was in progress. Out of these City players, all their squads reached the knock-out stages, seven reached the semi-finals and four England players reached the final, but ended up as runners-up.

City also had three representatives selected at the 2021 Copa América, Sergio Agüero joining Barcelona while the tournament was in progress. All three reached the final, but the two remaining Brazilian players ended up as runners-up.

As a result of having many players involved deep into these tournaments and with City's involvement in the 2021 Champions League final, City began their pre-season with all but eight of their first team rested on holiday. Only Zack Steffen, Benjamin Mendy, Riyad Mahrez and Fernandinho from the regular starters in 2020–21 were able to participate in a full pre-season. However, this gave an opportunity for several EDS players to showcase their talents for a possible first team place.

Most of the pre-season transfer speculation concerned the potential replacements for Sergio Agüero, who had left at the end of the 2020–21 season after 10 years and as the club's all-time leading goalscorer. Of the potential targets, Harry Kane was seen as the leading candidate, but was expected to command a significant and possibly record-breaking transfer fee from Tottenham. There was also speculation that Jack Grealish would be signed from Aston Villa on a similarly record fee to strengthen City's creative midfield and provide additional cover for Kevin De Bruyne, who had experienced several extended periods of injury absence during the previous seasons.

Grealish completed his transfer to City on 5 August 2021, signing a 6-year contract, for what at the time was a reported record British transfer fee of £100 million. He was allocated the iconic number 10 shirt, previously worn by Agüero between 2015 and 2021.

=== Start of season ===
On 7 August, Manchester City started their season with the FA Community Shield, a traditional curtain raiser played between the previous season's league champions and FA Cup winners. This was City's first FA Community Shield since 2019 when they beat Liverpool 5–4 on penalties after a 1–1 draw. On this occasion, an understrength City (many players were still out-of-form after Euro 2020) were beaten 1–0 at Wembley by Leicester City with an 89th-minute penalty won and scored by former City academy graduate Kelechi Iheanacho.

The Premier League season began with all restrictions on stadium attendances lifted for the first time since the start of the pandemic in March 2020.

City began their league season on 15 August with a third consecutive competitive 1–0 defeat, this time against Tottenham at their north London stadium. This was the first time in 10 years that City had failed to win their opening league game of the season; coincidentally the last time being a 0–0 away draw at White Hart Lane in the 2010–11 season. It was also City's fourth consecutive defeat at Tottenham since the new stadium was opened and meant that City had yet to score a goal at this ground.

On 25 August, Harry Kane announced he would be staying at Tottenham "this summer", ending the speculation that City would be able to negotiate an acceptable transfer fee with Tottenham's chairman Daniel Levy. On the same day it was reported that Pep Guardiola had revealed that he would leave the club when his current contract ends in summer 2023. However, Guardiola later retracted this and said he was talking about whenever his contract at City ended he would be considering an opportunity to manage a national side.

On 26 August, Benjamin Mendy was charged by Cheshire Constabulary with four counts of rape and one count of sexual assault. Mendy was immediately suspended by City and remanded in custody with a trial date set for 24 January 2022. This was later set back until June 2022.

On 8 September, it was announced that Brazil and three other South American nations had invoked a five-day FIFA ban on Premier League players who had been called up for international duty for the 2022 World Cup qualifiers during the September international window, but who had been refused permission to travel by their clubs to avoid a 10-day quarantine period required by UK Government public health regulations when they returned from so-called "Red list" countries with high levels of COVID-19 infection. This would have prevented City from including Ederson and Gabriel Jesus in their squad to play Leicester City on 11 September. However, the ban was rescinded on the morning of the fixture, and City went on to win the game 1–0 with both Brazilian players in the starting XI.

On 15 September, City beat RB Leipzig 6–3 in their first UEFA Champions League group game of the season. At the time, this was Pep Guardiola's 300th game as City manager and 750th overall. The Blues became the fastest English team to register 50 Champions League wins (in 91 games) and the second fastest of all time behind Real Madrid (88 games). (Note: These 50 UCL wins exclude two victories over FC Steaua București in the 2016–17 qualifying play-off round.)

=== Autumn period ===
On 21 September, City beat League One side Wycombe Wanderers 6–1 at home in the third round of the Carabao Cup. This win was Pep Guardiola's 220th as City manager, equalling the club record previously held by Les McDowell between 1950 and 1963. Guardiola had achieved this in only 302 games compared to 592 games managed by McDowell. The game was also noteworthy in that six academy graduates made their City first team debuts that night, the most in the modern history of the club academy.

On 25 September, City defeated Chelsea, one of their main title rivals, who at the time were on a streak of three consecutive wins against City, including in the Champions League final. The Blues recorded a 1–0 away win at Stamford Bridge to mark Guardiola's 221st City win and make him the most successful manager in the club's history.

On 12 October, five City players started for England versus Hungary in their 2022 FIFA World Cup qualifier 1–1 draw at Wembley Stadium. This set a new club record for representatives starting in a national team XI.

On 27 October, City were beaten 5–3 on penalties after a goalless draw at West Ham United in the fourth round of the Carabao Cup, thus ending their 4-year domination of the competition, in which they had not lost a competitive fixture in 21 games since the 2016–17 season.

City's early season league form was variable, and by the time of the final autumn international break in early November they had two defeats and two draws from their first 11 league fixtures and only two points more than in the 2020–21 season (where they had also started off slowly, but then had embarked on a record-breaking mid season winning streak to secure their league title). However, City had by then played all of the previous season's other top 5 clubs away from home, remaining undefeated and only dropping points in their 2–2 draw against Liverpool at Anfield. The other favourites for the league title had also dropped points; so that by 7 November City were in second place, just 3 points behind the early league leaders Chelsea, and equal on points with surprise form team West Ham. With 2 group games remaining City were also just a point from qualifying for the knockout stage of that season's Champions League.

On 24 November, City duly qualified for the last 16 of the Champions League as Group A winners when they beat Paris Saint Germain 2–1 at home.

City's 2–1 away victory against Aston Villa on 1 December was Guardiola's 150th win in the Premier League. He became only the 4th manager to achieve this at a single club and the fastest to achieve the milestone (in only 204 games).

On 4 December (gameweek 15), City beat Watford 3–1 away to notch up 5 consecutive league victories and reach the top of the Premier League for the first time that season.

City's 1–0 win against Wolves in their following league game was notable as Raheem Sterling scored his 100th Premier League goal and Ederson kept his 100th clean sheet for the club in all competitions.

=== Christmas and New Year ===
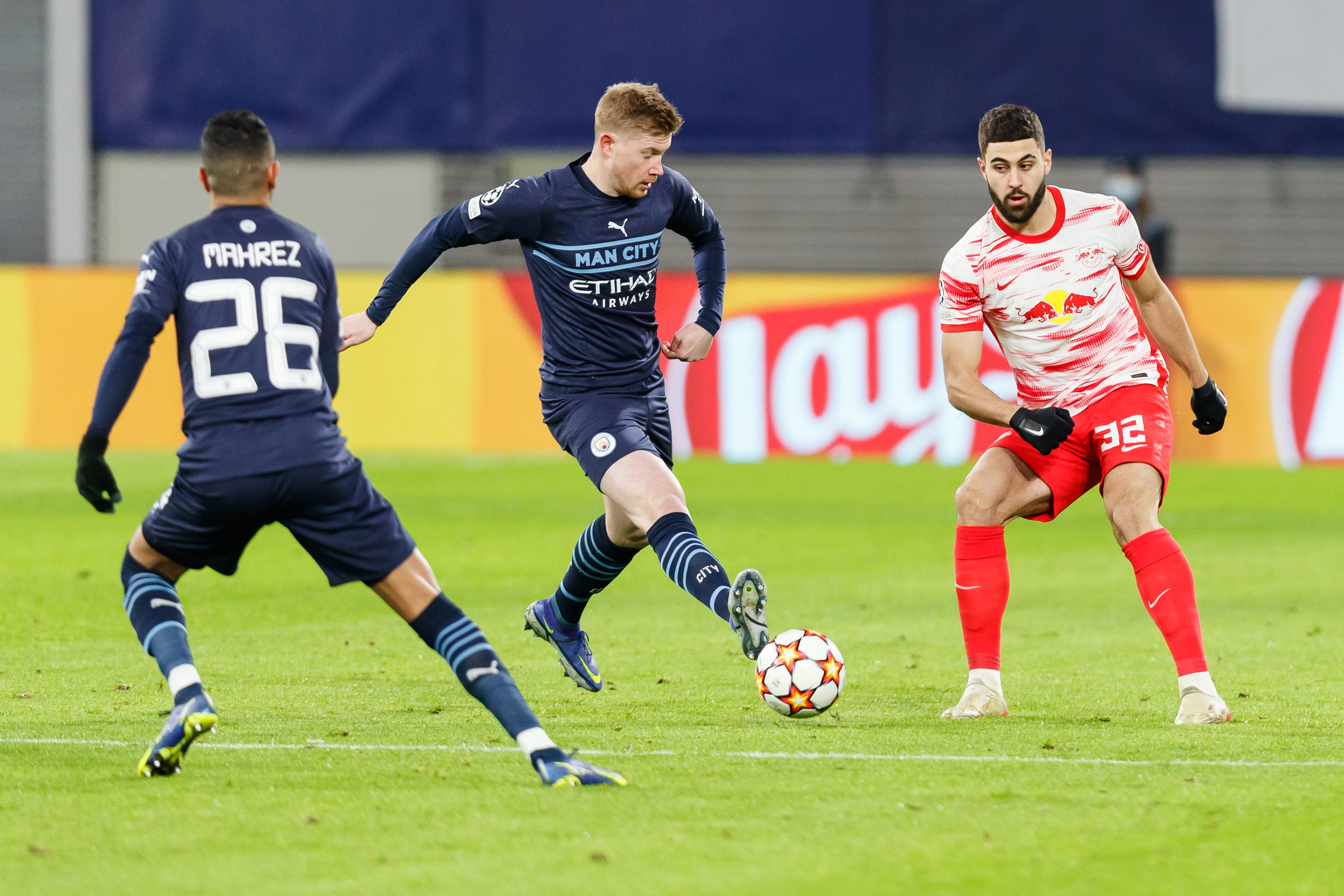
Kevin De Bruyne and Riyad Mahrez in an away Champions League match against Leipzig

On 14 December, City beat Leeds United 7–0 at home to record their biggest victory of the season so far. The first goal, scored by Phil Foden, marked the 500th scored by a Pep Guardiola team in the Premier League; he became the fastest to record this feat after only 207 games, beating the previous record by Jurgen Klopp (234 games). This win also was City's 33rd league victory of the calendar year, equalling a top flight record set by Liverpool in 1982.

On 19 December, City's 4–0 win away to Newcastle ensured they would stay top of the table at Christmas. It also signified two new records: for the most league wins by an English top flight team in a calendar year (34) and for the most league goals scored in a calendar year by a Premier League team (106), despite still having two league games to play before the New Year.

On 28 December, City announced that Spanish forward Ferran Torres would join Barcelona in the New Year for a reported fee of €55m (£46.3m) upfront and up to €10m (£9.3m) in possible add-ons. Torres had not played for City since the League Cup victory against Wycombe in late September due to an injury picked up during the October internationals. He had been at the club for only 18 months, but City had recouped over double his transfer fee from Valencia. Barcelona needed a forward to replace Sergio Agüero who had been forced to retire early on medical grounds a few weeks beforehand.

City maintained their ten-game league winning streak into the New Year. They ended 2021 with 50 points, eight points clear of Chelsea at the top of the table and nine points ahead of Liverpool in third place, who also had a game in hand. In all, City had won 36 league games in 2021 and scored 113 goals, setting new top division and Premier League records respectively.

Another close fought game against Chelsea, this time at the City of Manchester Stadium, was won 1–0 on 15 January thanks to a beautiful Kevin De Bruyne curling shot, producing a statement victory for the Blues and extending their league winning run to 12 games. The result put City on 56 points, 13 ahead of Chelsea in second and 14 ahead of Liverpool in third, who still had two games in hand.

However, City's winning streak was ended in the following game on 22 January when they drew 1–1 away to Southampton and their league lead was cut to nine points from Liverpool, who still had a game in hand. However, the result signified another new record as Guardiola became the fastest manager to reach 500 Premier League points earned, in only 213 games – eighteen games fewer than his closest rival.

On winter transfer deadline day, City announced that they had signed 22 year-old Argentine versatile forward Julián Álvarez for a reported £14.1 million fee from River Plate. Álvarez had subsequently been loaned back to River Plate until at least July 2022 so that he would be able to participate in the 2022 Copa Libertadores for his previous club. If River Plate qualified to the quarter-finals or beyond his loan might be extended as far as the break for the 2022 FIFA World Cup. At the time, Álvarez was the current South American Footballer of the Year and the golden boot holder for the Argentine Primera Division.

=== Spring period ===
Raheem Sterling scored City's first hat-trick of the season in their 4–0 win away to Norwich City in the Premier League on 12 February 2022. It was notable as a perfect hat-trick, and took Sterling onto the list of top 10 goal-scorers in all competitions for the club .

City earnt a commanding first leg lead in their Champions League round of 16 tie against Sporting CP, beating the Portuguese champions 5–0 away on 15 February, including a brace from Bernardo Silva.

However, they went on to be beaten 3–2 at home by Spurs in their next league fixture; their first league defeat for four months; and a result which closed the gap at the top of the table to second placed Liverpool to only 6 points, with Liverpool still having a game in hand and still to play City at the City of Manchester Stadium in early April. City had equalised twice in the game, including a 92nd-minute penalty from Riyad Mahrez (which was notable as City's 100th goal in all competitions that season), but the game was won by a headed goal in the 95th minute from erstwhile City transfer target Harry Kane, who had already scored Spurs second goal earlier in the second half.

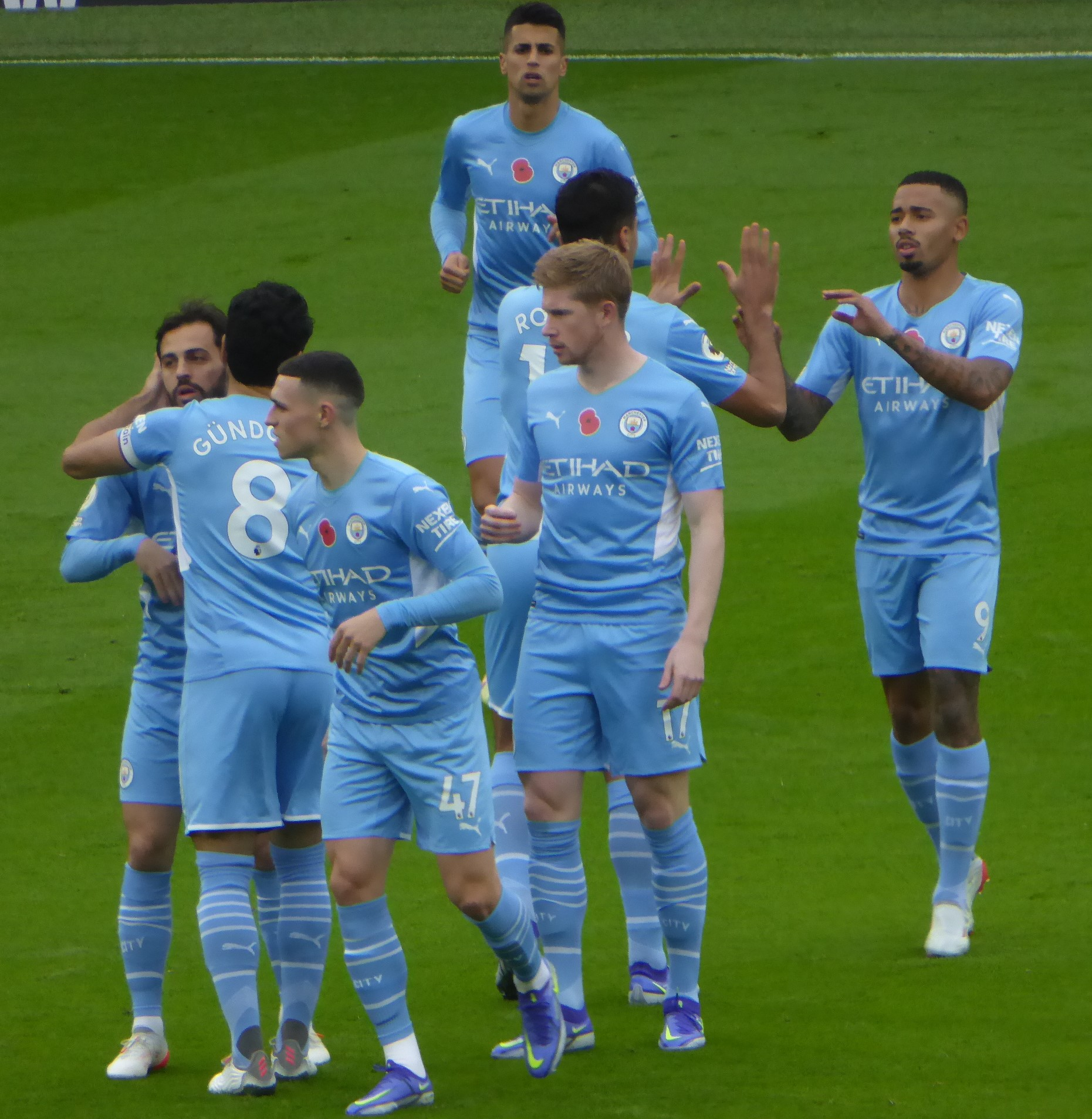
City players celebrate during the Premier League game against Manchester United

An outstanding team performance against their closest rivals saw City convincingly beat Manchester United 4–1 at home on 6 March with a brace apiece from Riyad Mahrez and man of the match Kevin De Bruyne. This broke a sequence of 3 consecutive derby losses at home. Mahrez had now scored over 20 goals in a season in all competitions for the first time in his career and De Bruyne passed the milestone of fifty Premier League goals. The result still meant City led the league from Liverpool by 6 points having played a game more.

City drew 0–0 with Sporting on 9 March in the second leg of their Champions League round of 16 tie to win 5–0 on aggregate and qualify for the quarter-finals for the fifth season in succession. By the time of the March international break, City's lead in the league had been cut to 1 point after another frustrating 0–0 draw with Crystal Palace at Selhurst Park on 14 March and Liverpool's continued league winning streak since January. On a brighter note, the Blues qualified for their fourth consecutive FA Cup semi-final when they beat Southampton 4–1 at St. Mary's on 20 March.

=== Season run-in ===
City returned from the March international break knowing they had up to 16 games of the season remaining over eight weeks, in which they could secure a treble of titles. This would start with a sequence of five games over 14 days where the Blues would play both Atlético Madrid and Liverpool twice in alternating fixtures: the two-legged Champions League quarter-finals, a potentially decisive home league fixture and a FA Cup semi-final at Wembley.

However, first City had to retake the top spot from Liverpool, which they successfully accomplished by beating Burnley 2–0 at Turf Moor on 2 April, after their rivals had defeated Watford by the same score at home earlier that day. Three days later, a 1–0 victory over Atlético in the first leg of the Champions League quarter-finals gave City a slender advantage before heading to Madrid. On 10 April, an exciting and high quality 2–2 home draw against Liverpool ensured City retained a single point advantage at the top of the league with seven games remaining.

Just three days after a title decider versus Liverpool, City faced Atlético on the road. An intense and maturely hard fought 0–0 draw in Madrid ensured City progressed to the semi-finals for the second consecutive season. There, the Blues would face Real Madrid who had closely beaten Chelsea over the two legs. Unfortunately, the closeness of the Atlético tie prevented Guardiola from resting his strongest squad, and several key players suffered injuries while Jürgen Klopp was able to effectively play his "B team" in Liverpool's quarter-final home tie against Benfica the same night.

The FA Cup semi-final awaited in just three days, on 16 April, after an excruciating battle with Atlético. As such, Guardiola was forced to make seven changes for the match against Liverpool. A dominant display from the Scoursers at Wembley saw them take a three-goal lead against an underperforming City side by half-time, including a Sadio Mané goal which resulted from an error from back up keeper Zack Steffen, who Guardiola always selected to play in City's domestic cup fixtures. The Blues managed to improve in the second half, with goals from Jack Grealish and Bernardo Silva nearly erasing the deficit, but Liverpool withstood the pressure to a nervous 3–2 victory, ending Citizens' hopes of the treble. Although Manchester City had reached five FA Cup semi-finals during Guardiola's tenure at the club, they had only succeeded in reaching one final (in 2019), while losing three consecutive FA Cup semi-finals starting from 2020 and also losing three consecutive appearances at Wembley.

A 3–0 win against Brighton on 20 April saw City keep Liverpool at the same distance of a point. This victory was Guardiola's 250th as City manager in all competitions. Just three days later, the Blues produced another convincing win, this time beating Watford 5–1. Gabriel Jesus scored four goals and became the third City player to do so in a Premier League match after Sergio Agüero and Edin Džeko. This was also City's 15th consecutive Premier League victory against the Hornets, setting another PL record.

Another three days later, on 26 April, Manchester City defeated Real Madrid 4–3 in an outstanding game at a capacity City of Manchester Stadium to take a slight advantage to the Santiago Bernabéu. City scored in under two minutes, as Kevin De Bruyne finished the fastest goal in European Cup semi-finals history, and had held a two-goal advantage on three occasions during the match, while also squandering multiple good opportunities to increase the lead, only to see a resilient Madrid side reduce the deficit to a single goal, courtesy of a brace (which included a Panenka penalty) from Real Madrid's top scorer, captain and talisman Karim Benzema. The match was also notable by numerous missed goal opportunities (hitting the post, goal line clearances, goalkeeper saves) on the part of City players, with observers commenting that a 7–3 scoreline would have been more fair.

In their next league game, City beat Leeds away 4–0 to keep a one-point lead over Liverpool with just four PL games remaining. City had not conceded a league goal away from home in five consecutive fixtures and had remained undefeated in 16 away league games since their opening day loss at Tottenham (both new club records). Captain Fernandihno came on as a substitute to become the Brazilian player with the most Premier League appearances and celebrated by scoring City's final goal.

=== End of season ===
4 May was a tough day for the Blues, as they failed to reach the Champions League final in the most dramatic and heartbreaking fashion at the Santiago Bernabéu. Leading the game 1–0 (5–3 on aggregate), from a 75th-minute goal by Riyad Mahrez, City once again squandered several opportunities to put the game to bed and collapsed in the last minutes of the match. Approaching the injury time, it appeared City were heading comfortably to the final, where they would have met rivals Liverpool; however, two goals in a minute from Madrid's substitute striker Rodrygo sent the game into extra time, and another penalty from Benzema five minutes later proved to be the winner as City were defeated 1–3 (5–6 on aggregate).

The heartbreak, however, did not derail City as some rivals might have hoped. By the time of City's next league game on 8 May, Liverpool had finally dropped points in the title race by drawing 1–1 against Tottenham at Anfield. City were able to put their shock and disappointment from the Bernabéu to one side and capitalise on this, opening up a three-point lead and a four-goal difference advantage after a 5–0 thrashing of revitalised Newcastle United with a brace from Raheem Sterling and another man of the match performance from Kevin De Bruyne. The Blues required seven more points from three remaining fixtures to secure and retain their league title.

On 10 May, the club officially announced it had reached agreement with Borussia Dortmund to sign young Norwegian striker Erling Haaland on 1 July 2022 subject to completing terms. Haaland, the son of ex-City and Leeds midfielder Alf-Inge Haaland, was one of the most sought-after players in world football, having scored 85 goals in 88 appearances for Dortmund, and became the heir-apparent to Sergio Agüero the club had been seeking for several years.

Another big 5–1 win away at Wolves on 11 May, including four goals from Kevin De Bruyne, and a 24-minute hat-trick (the third fastest from the start of a game in Premier League history), reduced City's target to getting a maximum of four points from two remaining fixtures to retain their title. This game was Guardiola's 350th as City manager. It also signified another Premier League record for consecutive games won by a margin of three or more goals.

On 15 May, City fought back from conceding two first-half goals to draw 2–2 at West Ham, and could have won the match but for a late penalty miss from Riyad Mahrez. This was the first time since 2012 that City had come back from a two-goal deficit in a game. Nevertheless, the result still meant the Blues would win the league if they won their final fixture at home versus Aston Villa.

The season ended in dramatic circumstances on 22 May, as City once again overturned a two-goal deficit. With 15 minutes left to play, the Blues scored three goals in five minutes, including a brace from İlkay Gündoğan, to beat Aston Villa 3–2 and clinch the Premier League title amid jubilant scenes at the City of Manchester Stadium. Manchester City finished the league season on 93 points, one more than rivals Liverpool, making it their second consecutive league title and repeating the scenario of the 2018–19 season.

== First-team squad ==
N	Pos.	Nat.	Name	Age	Since	App	Goals	Assists	CS	Ends	Fee	Notes
2	DF	(England)	Kyle Walker	31	2017	215	6	17	–	2024	£45m	
3	DF	(Portugal)	Rúben Dias (VC)	25	2020	90	3	4	–	2027	£62m	Second VC
5	DF	(England)	John Stones	27	2016	195	12	2	–	2026	£47.5m	
6	DF	(Netherlands)	Nathan Aké	27	2020	40	4	1	–	2025	£40m	
7	FW	(England)	Raheem Sterling	27	2015	339	131	74	–	2023	£44m	
8	MF	(Germany)	İlkay Gündoğan (VC)	31	2016	253	49	32	–	2023	£20m	
9	FW	(Brazil)	Gabriel Jesus	25	2017 (Jan)	236	95	41	–	2023	£27m	
10	MF	(England)	Jack Grealish	26	2021	39	6	4	–	2027	£100m	Record signing
11	DF	(Ukraine)	Oleksandr Zinchenko	25	2016	128	2	12	–	2024	£1.7m	
13	GK	(United States)	Zack Steffen	27	2019	21	0	0	8	2025	£7m	
14	DF	(Spain)	Aymeric Laporte	27	2018 (Jan)	155	12	3	–	2025	£57m	
16	MF	(Spain)	Rodri	25	2019	151	13	9	–	2025	£62.8m	
17	MF	(Belgium)	Kevin De Bruyne (VC)	30	2015	307	86	115	–	2025	£54.5m	Third VC
20	MF	(Portugal)	Bernardo Silva	27	2017	251	48	49	–	2025	£43.5m	
22	DF	(France)	Benjamin Mendy	27	2017	75	2	12	–	2023	£52m	Suspended since 26 August 2021, pending trial
25	MF	(Brazil)	Fernandinho (Capt)	37	2013	383	26	27	–	2022	£30m	
26	FW	(Algeria)	Riyad Mahrez	31	2018	189	63	43	–	2023	£60m	
27	DF	(Portugal)	João Cancelo	27	2019	128	7	16	–	2027	£60m	
31	GK	(Brazil)	Ederson	28	2017	241	0	3	117	2026	£34.9m	
33	GK	(England)	Scott Carson	36	2021	2	0	0	0	2022	Free Transfer	On loan in 2019–21
37	FW	(Brazil)	Kayky	18	2021	1	0	0	–	2026	£8.6m	
47	MF	(England)	Phil Foden	21	2017	169	45	33	–	2024	Youth system	Academy graduate
48	FW	(England)	Liam Delap	19	2020	6	1	0	–	2026	£1.2m	
56	DF	(England)	CJ Egan-Riley	19	2021	3	0	0	–	2023	Youth system	Academy graduate
80	MF	(England)	Cole Palmer	20	2020	13	3	1	–	2026	Youth system	Academy graduate
87	MF	(England)	James McAtee	19	2021	6	0	0	–	2026	Youth system	Academy graduate

Updated to match played 22 May 2022
Source: fbref
Ordered by squad number.
Appearances include league and cup appearances, including as substitute.
Includes EDS players who train regularly with the first team, having made at least one previous league appearance.
Ages stated are as of 22 May 2022.

== Transfers ==
=== Transfers in ===
Date	Position	No.	Player	From	Fee	Team	Ref.
1 July 2021	DF		(Peru) Kluiverth Aguilar	(Peru) Alianza Lima	£1,500,000	Academy	
1 July 2021	FW		(Argentina) Darío Sarmiento	(Argentina) Estudiantes	Undisclosed	Academy	
15 July 2021	DF		(Finland) Tomas Galvez	Watford	Undisclosed	Academy	
15 July 2021	GK		(England) George Murray-Jones	Southend United	Undisclosed	Academy	
19 July 2021	GK	33	(England) Scott Carson	Derby County	Free	First team	
5 August 2021	MF	10	(England) Jack Grealish	Aston Villa	£100,000,000	First team	
31 August 2021	FW	37	(Brazil) Kayky	(Brazil) Fluminense	£8,640,000	Academy	
31 January 2022	FW		(Argentina) Julián Álvarez	(Argentina) River Plate	£14,100,000	First team	
Total					£124,250,000		

=== Transfers out ===
Date	Position	No.	Player	To	Fee	Team	Ref.
1 July 2021	FW	10	(Argentina) Sergio Agüero	(Spain) Barcelona	End of contract	First Team	
1 July 2021	DF		(Wales) Murphy Bennett	Forest Green Rovers	End of contract	Academy	
1 July 2021	MF	82	(Spain) Adrián Bernabé	(Italy) Parma	End of contract	Academy	
1 July 2021	MF		(England) Henry Timi Davies	Arsenal	End of contract	Academy	
1 July 2021	DF	50	(Spain) Eric García	(Spain) Barcelona	End of contract	First team	
1 July 2021	GK	32	(England) Daniel Grimshaw	Blackpool	End of contract	Academy	
1 July 2021	MF		(England) Dylan Helliwell	Huddersfield Town	End of contract	Academy	
1 July 2021	GK	70	(England) Louie Moulden	Wolverhampton Wanderers	End of contract	Academy	
1 July 2021	MF	61	(Germany) Felix Nmecha	(Germany) VfL Wolfsburg	End of contract	Academy	
1 July 2021	MF		(England) Cian Philpott	Huddersfield Town	End of contract	Academy	
1 July 2021	MF		(England) Luca Thomas	Leeds United	End of contract	Academy	
2 July 2021	MF	38	(England) Jack Harrison	Leeds United	£13,000,000	Academy	
9 July 2021	GK		(England) James Wright	Aston Villa	Undisclosed	Academy	
14 July 2021	GK		(Northern Ireland) Pierce Charles	Sheffield Wednesday	End of contract	Academy	
16 July 2021	FW	43	(Germany) Lukas Nmecha	(Germany) VfL Wolfsburg	£11,700,000	Academy	
12 August 2021	MF		(Serbia) Ivan Ilić	(Italy) Hellas Verona	£8,500,000	Academy	
27 August 2021	MF	54	(Republic of Ireland) Joe Hodge	Wolverhampton Wanderers	Undisclosed	Academy	
30 August 2021	DF	88	(Senegal) Alpha Dionkou	(Spain) Granada	Undisclosed	Academy	
31 August 2021	MF		(England) Harvey Griffiths	Wolverhampton Wanderers	Undisclosed	Academy	
1 January 2022	FW	21	(Spain) Ferran Torres	(Spain) Barcelona	£55,600,000 (Note: The fee was reported to be €55 million (£46.3 m) with up to €10 million (£9.3 m) in add ons, and subject to Barcelona meeting La Liga financial regulations by the end of January 2022.)	First team	
21 January 2022	MF	35	(England) Patrick Roberts	Sunderland	Undisclosed	First team	
30 January 2022	MF	—	(Serbia) Luka Ilić	(France) Troyes	Undisclosed	Academy	
31 January 2022	DF	59	(England) Camron Gbadebo	Colchester United	Undisclosed	Academy	
31 January 2022	DF	77	(England) Sam Robinson	Port Vale	Undisclosed	Academy	
31 January 2022	MF	65	(Wales) Matt Smith	MK Dons	Undisclosed	Academy	
31 January 2022	MF	74	(England) Luke Bolton	Salford City	Undisclosed	Academy	
1 February 2022	DF	34	(Netherlands) Philippe Sandler	(Netherlands) Feyenoord	Undisclosed	First team	
2 February 2022	DF	—	(United States) Erik Palmer-Brown	(France) Troyes	Undisclosed	Academy	
Total					£88,800,000 (Note: City also received an additional 15% (reportedly £13,2m) sell-on fee from the transfer of Jadon Sancho from Borussia Dortmund to Manchester United. This is not included in this total.)		

=== Loans out ===
Date	Loan ends	Position	No.	Player	To	Team	Ref.
1 July 2021	30 June 2022	DF		(Peru) Kluiverth Aguilar	(Belgium) Lommel	Academy	
1 July 2021	30 June 2022	GK	55	(Republic of Ireland) Gavin Bazunu	Portsmouth	Academy	
1 July 2021	11 January 2022 (Note: Harwood-Bellis's season long loan to Anderlecht was terminated on 11 January 2022 by mutual consent. He was subsequently loaned to Stoke City for the remainder of the season.)	DF	78	(England) Taylor Harwood-Bellis	(Belgium) Anderlecht	Academy	
1 July 2021	30 June 2022	DF		(Burkina Faso) Issa Kaboré	(France) Troyes	Academy	
1 July 2021	30 June 2022	FW	29	(Colombia) Marlos Moreno	(Belgium) Kortrijk	Academy	
1 July 2021	30 June 2022	MF	—	(Croatia) Ante Palaversa	(Belgium) Kortrijk	Academy	
1 July 2021	30 June 2022	MF		(Brazil) Diego Rosa	(Belgium) Lommel	Academy	
1 July 2021	30 June 2022	FW	—	(Serbia) Slobodan Tedić	(Netherlands) PEC Zwolle	Academy	
1 July 2021	13 January 2022 (Note: On 13 January, Trafford was recalled by his parent club Manchester City. He was subsequently loaned to Bolton Wanderers for the remainder of the season (see below).)	GK	85	(England) James Trafford	Accrington Stanley	Academy	
2 July 2021	30 June 2022	MF	71	(Scotland) Lewis Fiorini	Lincoln City	Academy	
5 July 2021	30 June 2022	MF	93	(England) Alex Robertson	(Scotland) Ross County	Academy	
8 July 2021	30 January 2022 (Note: Luka Ilić's season-long loan at Twente was ended early, and he subsequently joined Troyes permanently.)	MF	—	(Serbia) Luka Ilić	(Netherlands) Twente	Academy	
9 July 2021	30 June 2022	FW	—	(Serbia) Filip Stevanović	(Netherlands) SC Heerenveen	Academy	
16 July 2021	30 June 2022	DF	86	(England) Callum Doyle	Sunderland	Academy	
23 July 2021	30 June 2022	MF	—	(Japan) Ryotaro Meshino	(Portugal) Estoril	Academy	
30 July 2021	30 June 2022	FW	—	(Argentina) Nahuel Bustos	(Spain) Girona	Academy	
31 July 2021	30 June 2022	FW	—	(Argentina) Darío Sarmiento	(Spain) Girona	Academy	
July 2021	30 June 2022	MF	—	(Ghana) Aminu Mohammed	(Belgium) Lommel	Academy	
July 2021	30 June 2022	FW	—	(Ghana) Thomas Agyepong	(Belgium) Lommel	Academy	
5 August 2021	30 June 2022	GK	49	(Kosovo) Arijanet Muric	(Turkey) Adana Demirspor	First team	
6 August 2021	31 January 2022 (Note: Smith's season long loan was terminated on 31 January 2022 and he was transferred to MK Dons.)	MF	65	(Wales) Matt Smith	Hull City	Academy	
6 August 2021	30 June 2022	DF	—	(Venezuela) Nahuel Ferraresi	(Portugal) Estoril	Academy	
16 August 2021	30 June 2022	FW	96	(England) Ben Knight	Crewe Alexandra	Academy	
19 August 2021	30 June 2022	MF	—	(Australia) Daniel Arzani	(Belgium) Lommel	Academy	
19 August 2021	30 June 2022	DF	—	(Japan) Kō Itakura	(Germany) Schalke 04	Academy	
21 August 2021	30 June 2022	DF	39	(Brazil) Yan Couto	(Portugal) Braga	Academy	
23 August 2021	30 June 2022	MF	72	(England) Morgan Rogers	Bournemouth	Academy	
27 August 2021	30 June 2022	DF		(England) Yeboah Amankwah	Accrington Stanley	Academy	
31 August 2021	2 February 2022 (Note: Erik Palmer-Brown initially joined Troyes on a season-long loan, before singing permanently on 2 February.)	DF	—	(United States) Erik Palmer-Brown	(France) Troyes	Academy	
31 August 2021	20 January 2022 (Note: Doyle's season long loan to Hamburg was terminated on 20 January 2022 by mutual consent. He was subsequently loaned to Cardiff City for the remainder of the season.)	MF	69	(England) Tommy Doyle	(Germany) Hamburger SV	Academy	
31 August 2021	30 June 2022	MF	—	(Venezuela) Yangel Herrera	(Spain) Espanyol	Academy	
31 August 2021	30 June 2022	MF	81	(France) Claudio Gomes	Barnsley	Academy	
31 August 2021	21 January 2022 (Note: Roberts season long loan to Troyes was terminated on 21 January 2022 by mutual consent. He was subsequently transferred to Sunderland)	MF	35	(England) Patrick Roberts	(France) Troyes	First team	
31 August 2021	30 June 2022	MF	41	(Spain) Pablo Moreno	(Spain) Girona	Academy	
31 August 2021	25 January 2022 (Note: Sandler's season long loan was terminated on 25 January 2022.)	DF	34	(Netherlands) Philippe Sandler	(France) Troyes	First team	
11 January 2022	30 June 2022	DF	78	(England) Taylor Harwood-Bellis	Stoke City	Academy	
13 January 2022	30 June 2022	GK	85	(England) James Trafford	Bolton Wanderers	Academy	
20 January 2022	30 June 2022	MF	69	(England) Tommy Doyle	(Wales) Cardiff City	Academy	
31 January 2022	30 June 2022	DF	94	(England) Finley Burns	(Wales) Swansea City	Academy	
31 January 2022	11 July 2022 (Note: Álvarez was loaned to River Plate until the end of the 2022 Copa Libertadores round of 16 stage. The loan could have been further extended if River Plate reached the latter rounds of that competition; that did not happen and Álvarez joined City.)	FW		(Argentina) Julián Álvarez	(Argentina) River Plate	First team	
10 February 2022	30 June 2022	MF	66	(Spain) Iker Pozo	(Croatia) HNK Rijeka	Academy	

== Pre-season and friendlies ==
On 14 July, City announced they would host Preston North End at the Academy Stadium on 27 July, and would travel to France to take on fellow CFG club Troyes on 31 July. The Troyes game was later postponed indefinitely due to COVID-19 restrictions in France and England. Had the match taken place, City would have had to quarantine and therefore miss their FA Community Shield match against Leicester City. It was replaced by a game against Barnsley on 31 July. The same day, City's final preseason friendly against Blackpool was announced and scheduled for 3 August.

Win Draw Loss Postponed Fixtures

27 July 2021 Friendly	Manchester City	2–0	Preston North End	Manchester, England
19:00 BST	Mahrez 25'; Edozie 64'	Report		Stadium: Academy Stadium; Attendance: 0 (Behind-closed-doors)

31 July 2021 Friendly	Troyes	Cancelled	Manchester City	Troyes, France
21:00 CEST (UTC+2)				Stadium: Stade de l'Aube
Note: Match was cancelled on 21 July 2021 due to new COVID-19 quarantine restrictions on travelers to and from France.

31 July 2021 Friendly	Manchester City	4–0	Barnsley	Manchester, England
18:00 BST	Edozie 23'; Knight 30'; Mahrez 34'; Aké 69'	Report		Stadium: Academy Stadium; Attendance: 0 (Behind-closed-doors)

3 August 2021 Friendly	Manchester City	4–1	Blackpool	Manchester, England
18:00 BST	Edozie 3'; Mahrez 48'; Gündoğan 58', 75'	Report	Garbutt 21' (pen.)	Stadium: Academy Stadium; Attendance: 0 (Behind-closed-doors)

25 August 2021 Charity match	Barcelona	Cancelled	Manchester City	Barcelona, Spain
--:-- CEST (UTC+2)		Report		Stadium: Camp Nou
Note: The match was postponed on 29 July 2021 following former Barcelona assistant coach Juan Carlos Unzue's diagnosis with SARS-CoV-2. It had been then cancelled for the foreseeable future due to the restrictions in Catalonia that would have prevented Barcelona from hosting the game in front of a capacity crowd. The game was ultimately rescheduled for the start of the 2022–23 season.

== Competitions ==
=== Overview ===
Competition	First match	Last match	Starting round	Final position	Record							
Competition	First match	Last match	Starting round	Final position	Pld	W	D	L	GF	GA	GD	Win %
Premier League	15 August 2021	21 May 2022	Matchday 1	Winners	38	29	6	3	99	26	+73	76.32
FA Cup	7 January 2022	16 April 2022	Third round	Semi-finals	5	4	0	1	16	6	+10	80.00
EFL Cup	21 September 2021	27 October 2021	Third round	Fourth round	2	1	1	0	6	1	+5	50.00
FA Community Shield	7 August 2021		Final	Runners-up	1	0	0	1	0	1	−1	0.00
UEFA Champions League	15 September 2021	4 May 2022	Group stage	Semi-finals	12	7	2	3	29	16	+13	58.33
Total					58	41	9	8	150	50	+100	70.69

Source: Soccerway

=== Premier League ===
==== League table ====
Pos	Team	Pld	W	D	L	GF	GA	GD	Pts	Qualification or relegation
1	Manchester City (C)	38	29	6	3	99	26	+73	93	Qualification for the Champions League group stage
2	Liverpool	38	28	8	2	94	26	+68	92	Qualification for the Champions League group stage
3	Chelsea	38	21	11	6	76	33	+43	74	Qualification for the Champions League group stage
4	Tottenham Hotspur	38	22	5	11	69	40	+29	71	Qualification for the Champions League group stage
5	Arsenal	38	22	3	13	61	48	+13	69	Qualification for the Europa League group stage (Note: Since the winners of the 2021–22 FA Cup and the 2021–22 EFL Cup, Liverpool, qualified for the Champions League, the spot given to the FA Cup winners (Europa League group stage) was passed to the sixth-placed team and the spot given to the League Cup winners (Europa Conference League play-off round) was passed to the seventh-placed team.)

Source: Premier League
Rules for classification: 1) Points; 2) Goal difference; 3) Goals scored; 4) If the champions, relegated teams or qualified teams for UEFA competitions cannot be determined by rules 1 to 3, rules 4.1 to 4.3 are applied – 4.1) Points gained in head-to-head record between such teams; 4.2) Away goals scored in head-to-head record between such teams; 4.3) Play-offs
(C) Champions

==== Results summary ====
Overall								Home						Away					
Pld	W	D	L	GF	GA	GD	Pts	W	D	L	GF	GA	GD	W	D	L	GF	GA	GD
38	29	6	3	99	26	+73	93	15	2	2	58	15	+43	14	4	1	41	11	+30

Source: Premier League

==== Results by matchday ====
Matchday	1	2	3	4	5	6	7	8	9	10	11	12	13	14	15	16	17	18	19	20	21	22	23	24	25	26	27	28	29	30	31	32	33	34	35	36	37	38
Ground	A	H	H	A	H	A	A	H	A	H	A	H	H	A	A	H	H	A	H	A	A	H	A	H	A	H	A	H	A	A	H	H	H	A	H	A	A	H
Result	L	W	W	W	D	W	D	W	W	L	W	W	W	W	W	W	W	W	W	W	W	W	D	W	W	L	W	W	D	W	D	W	W	W	W	W	D	W
Position	13	9	7	5	5	2	3	3	3	3	2	2	2	2	1	1	1	1	1	1	1	1	1	1	1	1	1	1	1	1	1	1	1	1	1	1	1	1
Points	0	3	6	9	10	13	14	17	20	20	23	26	29	32	35	38	41	44	47	50	53	56	57	60	63	63	66	69	70	73	74	77	80	83	86	89	90	93

Source: Premier League
A = Away; H = Home; W = Win; D = Draw; L = Loss
Notes: Positions show the situation at the end of the corresponding Game Weeks (GW), not the position at the conclusion of matches or game days.

==== Matches ====
The league fixtures were announced on 16 June 2021.

15 August 2021 1	Tottenham Hotspur	1–0	Manchester City	Tottenham
16:30 BST	Son 55'; Lucas (yellow card) 66'; Sánchez (yellow card) 90+1'	Report	Grealish (yellow card) 90+1'	Stadium: Tottenham Hotspur Stadium; Attendance: 58,262; Referee: Anthony Taylor

21 August 2021 2	Manchester City	5–0	Norwich City	Manchester
15:00 BST	Krul 7' (o.g.); Grealish 22'; Gündoğan (yellow card) 39'; Laporte 64'; Sterling 71'; Mahrez 84'	Report		Stadium: City of Manchester Stadium; Attendance: 51,437; Referee: Graham Scott

29 August 2021 3	Manchester City	5–0	Arsenal	Manchester
12:30 BST	Gündoğan 7'; Torres 12', 84'; Gabriel Jesus 43'; Rodri 53', (yellow card) 67'	Report	Cédric (yellow card) 24'; Kolašinac (yellow card) 28'; Xhaka (red card) 35'	Stadium: City of Manchester Stadium; Attendance: 52,276; Referee: Martin Atkinson

11 September 2021 4	Leicester City	0–1	Manchester City	Leicester
15:00 BST	Söyüncü (yellow card) 75'	Report	Rodri (yellow card) 26'; Laporte (yellow card) 38'; Silva 62'	Stadium: King Power Stadium; Attendance: 32,087; Referee: Paul Tierney

18 September 2021 5	Manchester City	0–0	Southampton	Manchester
15:00 BST		Report	Walker-Peters (yellow card) 52'; Livramento (yellow card) 84'	Stadium: City of Manchester Stadium; Attendance: 52,698; Referee: Jonathan Moss

25 September 2021 6	Chelsea	0–1	Manchester City	Fulham
12:30 BST	Alonso (yellow card) 77'; Christensen (yellow card) 78'; Rüdiger (yellow card) 84'	Report	Gabriel Jesus 53'; Laporte (yellow card) 65'; Dias (yellow card) 90+6'	Stadium: Stamford Bridge; Attendance: 40,036; Referee: Michael Oliver

3 October 2021 7	Liverpool	2–2	Manchester City	Liverpool
16:30 BST	Milner (yellow card) 42'; Mane 59'; Jota (yellow card) 65'; Salah 76'; Fabinho (yellow card) 83'	Report	Dias (yellow card) 26'; Cancelo (yellow card) 56'; Foden 69'; Silva (yellow card) 77'; De Bruyne 81'	Stadium: Anfield; Attendance: 53,102; Referee: Paul Tierney

16 October 2021 8	Manchester City	2–0	Burnley	Manchester
15:00 BST	Silva 12'; Laporte (yellow card) 45+3'; De Bruyne 70'	Report		Stadium: City of Manchester Stadium; Attendance: 52,711; Referee: Martin Atkinson

23 October 2021 9	Brighton & Hove Albion	1–4	Manchester City	Falmer
17:30 BST	Moder (yellow card) 63'; Lallana (yellow card) 70'; Mac Allister 81' (pen.)	Report	Gündoğan 13'; Walker (yellow card) 22'; Foden 28', 31'; Cancelo (yellow card) 60'; Ederson (yellow card) 84'; Mahrez 90+5'	Stadium: Falmer Stadium; Attendance: 31,215; Referee: Kevin Friend

30 October 2021 10	Manchester City	0–2	Crystal Palace	Manchester
15:00 BST	Laporte (red card) 45+2'; Silva (yellow card) 45+5'; Ederson (yellow card) 45+6'	Report	Zaha 6'; Ayew (yellow card) 27'; Gallagher (yellow card) 65', (goal) 88'; Guaita (yellow card) 86'	Stadium: City of Manchester Stadium; Attendance: 53,014; Referee: Andre Marriner

6 November 2021 11	Manchester United	0–2	Manchester City	Manchester
12:30 GMT	Ronaldo (yellow card) 90'	Report	Bailly 7' (o.g.); Silva 45', (yellow card) 58'; Cancelo (yellow card) 48'	Stadium: Old Trafford; Attendance: 73,086; Referee: Michael Oliver

21 November 2021 12	Manchester City	3–0	Everton	Manchester
14:00 GMT	Sterling 44'; Laporte (yellow card) 45+3'; Rodri 55'; Silva 86'	Report	Richarlison (yellow card) 31'	Stadium: City of Manchester Stadium; Attendance: 52,571; Referee: Stuart Attwell

28 November 2021 13	Manchester City	2–1	West Ham United	Manchester
14:00 GMT	Laporte (yellow card) 29'; Gündoğan 33'; Cancelo (yellow card) 61'; Fernandinho 90'	Report	Lanzini 90+4'	Stadium: City of Manchester Stadium; Attendance: 53,245; Referee: Michael Oliver

1 December 2021 14	Aston Villa	1–2	Manchester City	Aston
20:15 GMT	Watkins 47'	Report	Dias 27'; Silva 43'	Stadium: Villa Park; Attendance: 41,400; Referee: Mike Dean

4 December 2021 15	Watford	1–3	Manchester City	Watford
17:30 GMT	King (yellow card) 7'; Rose (yellow card) 31'; Hernández 74'; Cathcart (yellow card) 85'	Report	Sterling 4'; Silva 31', 63'	Stadium: Vicarage Road; Attendance: 20,673; Referee: Simon Hooper

11 December 2021 16	Manchester City	1–0	Wolverhampton Wanderers	Manchester
12:30 GMT	Dias (yellow card) 40'; Rodri (yellow card) 43'; Sterling 66' (pen.); Cancelo (yellow card) 81'	Report	Jiménez (yellow card) 45+1' (yellow-red card) 45+2'; Neves (yellow card) 45+3'; Dendoncker (yellow card) 78'	Stadium: City of Manchester Stadium; Attendance: 52,613; Referee: Jonathan Moss

14 December 2021 17	Manchester City	7–0	Leeds United	Manchester
20:00 GMT	Foden 8'; Grealish 13'; De Bruyne 32', 62'; Dias (yellow card) 40'; Mahrez 49'; Stones 74'; Aké 78'	Report	Firpo (yellow card) 20'	Stadium: City of Manchester Stadium; Attendance: 52,401; Referee: Paul Tierney

19 December 2021 18	Newcastle United	0–4	Manchester City	Newcastle upon Tyne
14:15 GMT	Hayden (yellow card) 21'	Report	Dias 5'; Rodri (yellow card) 25'; Cancelo 27'; Silva (yellow card) 30'; Mahrez 63'; Sterling 86'	Stadium: St James' Park; Attendance: 52,127; Referee: Martin Atkinson

26 December 2021 19	Manchester City	6–3	Leicester City	Manchester
15:00 GMT	De Bruyne 5'; Mahrez 14' (pen.); Gündoğan 21'; Sterling 27' (pen.), 87'; Laporte 69'; Fernandinho (yellow card) 90+1'	Report	Vestergaard (yellow card) 45'; Maddison 55', (yellow card) 75'; Lookman 59'; Iheanacho 65'	Stadium: City of Manchester Stadium; Attendance: 53,226; Referee: Chris Kavanagh

29 December 2021 20	Brentford	0–1	Manchester City	Brentford
20:15 GMT		Report	Foden 16'	Stadium: Brentford Community Stadium; Attendance: 17,009; Referee: David Coote

1 January 2022 21	Arsenal	1–2	Manchester City	Holloway
12:30 GMT	Saka 31', (yellow card) 64'; Xhaka (yellow card) 55'; Gabriel (yellow card) 58' (yellow-red card) 59'; Holding (yellow card) 68'	Report	Mahrez 57' (pen.); Rodri 90+3', (yellow card) 90+4'; Silva (yellow card) 90+5'	Stadium: Emirates Stadium; Attendance: 59,757; Referee: Stuart Attwell

15 January 2022 22	Manchester City	1–0	Chelsea	Manchester
12:30 GMT	De Bruyne 70'	Report	Alonso (yellow card) 7'; Kovačić (yellow card) 32'	Stadium: City of Manchester Stadium; Attendance: 53,319; Referee: Craig Pawson

22 January 2022 23	Southampton	1–1	Manchester City	Southampton
17:30 GMT	Walker-Peters 7'; Bednarek (yellow card) 33'; Armstrong (yellow card) 79'; Elyounoussi (yellow card) 90+2'	Report	Laporte 65'	Stadium: St Mary's Stadium; Attendance: 31,178; Referee: Simon Hooper

9 February 2022 24	Manchester City	2–0	Brentford	Manchester
19:45 GMT	Mahrez 40' (pen.); De Bruyne 69'	Report		Stadium: City of Manchester Stadium; Attendance: 51,658; Referee: Darren England

12 February 2022 25	Norwich City	0–4	Manchester City	Norwich
17:30 GMT		Report	Dias (yellow card) 17'; Sterling 31', 70', 90', (penalty missed) 90', (yellow card) 90+2'; Foden 48'	Stadium: Carrow Road; Attendance: 27,010; Referee: Andre Marriner

19 February 2022 26	Manchester City	2–3	Tottenham Hotspur	Manchester
17:30 GMT	Gündoğan 33'; Mahrez 90+2' (pen.)	Report	Kulusevski 4'; Kane 59', 90+5'; Højbjerg (yellow card) 64'; Romero (yellow card) 77'; Lloris (yellow card) 80'	Stadium: City of Manchester Stadium; Attendance: 53,201; Referee: Anthony Taylor

26 February 2022 27	Everton	0–1	Manchester City	Liverpool
17:30 GMT	Van de Beek (yellow card) 27'; Allan (yellow card) 57'; Alli (yellow card) 90+6'	Report	Foden 82', (yellow card) 89'; Ederson (yellow card) 87'	Stadium: Goodison Park; Attendance: 39,105; Referee: Paul Tierney

6 March 2022 28	Manchester City	4–1	Manchester United	Manchester
16:30 GMT	De Bruyne 5', 28'; Mahrez 68', 90+3'	Report	Sancho 22'; Maguire (yellow card) 63'	Stadium: City of Manchester Stadium; Attendance: 53,165; Referee: Michael Oliver

14 March 2022 29	Crystal Palace	0–0	Manchester City	Selhurst
20:00 GMT	Kouyaté (yellow card) 44'; Gallagher (yellow card) 83'; Édouard (yellow card) 90'	Report	Grealish (yellow card) 54'	Stadium: Selhurst Park; Attendance: 25,309; Referee: Martin Atkinson

2 April 2022 30	Burnley	0–2	Manchester City	Burnley
15:00 BST	Weghorst (yellow card) 13'	Report	De Bruyne 5'; Gündoğan 25'	Stadium: Turf Moor; Attendance: 20,388; Referee: Craig Pawson

10 April 2022 31	Manchester City	2–2	Liverpool	Manchester
16:30 BST	De Bruyne 5'; Gabriel Jesus 36'; Silva (yellow card) 40'	Report	Jota 13'; Robertson (yellow card) 28'; Mané 46'; Thiago (yellow card) 61'; Fabinho (yellow card) 83'; Van Dijk (yellow card) 89'	Stadium: City of Manchester Stadium; Attendance: 53,197; Referee: Anthony Taylor

20 April 2022 32	Manchester City	3–0	Brighton & Hove Albion	Manchester
20:00 BST	Mahrez 53'; Foden 65'; Silva 82'	Report	Mac Allister (yellow card) 79'; Webster (yellow card) 81'; Dunk (yellow card) 89'	Stadium: City of Manchester Stadium; Attendance: 52,226; Referee: Mike Dean

23 April 2022 33	Manchester City	5–1	Watford	Manchester
15:00 BST	Gabriel Jesus 4', 23', 49', 53'; Rodri 34'; Cancelo (yellow card) 43'	Report	Kamara 28'	Stadium: City of Manchester Stadium; Attendance: 53,013; Referee: Kevin Friend

30 April 2022 34	Leeds United	0–4	Manchester City	Leeds
17:30 BST	Firpo (yellow card) 6'	Report	Rodri 13'; Grealish (yellow card) 14'; Aké 54'; Cancelo (yellow card) 68'; Gabriel Jesus 78'; Fernandinho 90+3'	Stadium: Elland Road; Attendance: 35,771; Referee: Paul Tierney

8 May 2022 35	Manchester City	5–0	Newcastle United	Manchester
16:30 BST	Sterling 19', 90+3'; Laporte 38'; Rodri 61'; De Bruyne (yellow card) 75'; Foden 90+1'	Report	Bruno Guimarães (yellow card) 31'; Burn (yellow card) 70'; Targett (yellow card) 89'	Stadium: City of Manchester Stadium; Attendance: 53,336; Referee: Stuart Attwell

11 May 2022 36	Wolverhampton Wanderers	1–5	Manchester City	Wolverhampton
20:15 BST	Dendoncker 11'	Report	De Bruyne 7', 16', 24', 60', (yellow card) 78'; Sterling 84'	Stadium: Molineux; Attendance: 31,686; Referee: Martin Atkinson

15 May 2022 37	West Ham United	2–2	Manchester City	Stratford
14:00 BST	Bowen 24', 45', (yellow card) 32'; Coufal (yellow card) 58'; Fabiański (yellow card) 60'	Report	Grealish 49'; Coufal 69' (o.g.); Mahrez (penalty missed) 86'; Gabriel Jesus (yellow card) 90+4'	Stadium: London Stadium; Attendance: 59,972; Referee: Anthony Taylor

22 May 2022 38	Manchester City	3–2	Aston Villa	Manchester
16:00 BST	Gündoğan 76', 81'; Rodri 78'	Report	Cash 37'; Mings (yellow card) 49'; Coutinho 69'; Nakamba (yellow card) 86'	Stadium: City of Manchester Stadium; Attendance: 53,395; Referee: Michael Oliver

=== FA Cup ===
As a Premier League club, City entered the tournament in the third round proper. The third round draw was held on 6 December 2021 live on ITV4, before the second round tie between Boreham Wood and St. Albans City, by former England internationals David Seaman and Faye White. City were drawn away to League Two side Swindon Town. The draw for the fourth round took place live on ITV ahead of Arsenal's visit to Championship side Nottingham Forest, with former City goalkeeper David James and current Arsenal Women captain Leah Williamson picking out the ties at Wembley Stadium. City were drawn out at home against Fulham. The fifth round draw was held on 5 February 2022 prior to the tie between Liverpool and Cardiff City on ITV by Andrew Cole. City were drawn away to Championship side Peterborough United, who they had only played once before: on their way to the 1981 FA Cup final. The quarter-final draw was held on 3 March 2022 prior to the tie between Everton and Boreham Wood on ITV by England manager Gareth Southgate. City were drawn away to fellow Premier League side Southampton. The semi-final draw was made by Robbie Fowler at the City Ground on ITV before the quarter-final between Nottingham Forest and Liverpool. City were drawn against the winner of that tie, who turned out to be Liverpool after a hard-fought 1–0 victory.

7 January 2022 Third round	Swindon Town	1–4	Manchester City	Swindon
20:00 GMT (UTC±0)	McKirdy 78'	Report	Silva 14'; Gabriel Jesus 28', (penalty missed) 62'; Gündoğan 59'; Rodri (yellow card) 64'; Walker (yellow card) 80'; Palmer 82'; McAtee (yellow card) 90+2'	Stadium: County Ground; Attendance: 14,753; Referee: Darren England

5 February 2022 Fourth round	Manchester City	4–1	Fulham	Manchester
15:00 GMT (UTC±0)	Gündoğan 6'; Stones 13'; Walker (yellow card) 45+3'; Mahrez 53' (pen.), 57'	Report	Carvalho 4'	Stadium: City of Manchester Stadium; Attendance: 53,400; Referee: Jarred Gillett

1 March 2022 Fifth round	Peterborough United	0–2	Manchester City	Peterborough
19:15 GMT (UTC±0)	Szmodics (yellow card) 70'	Report	Aké (yellow card) 17'; Mahrez 60'; Grealish 67'; Fernandinho (yellow card) 70'	Stadium: London Road Stadium; Attendance: 13,405; Referee: Andrew Madley

20 March 2022 Quarter-finals	Southampton	1–4	Manchester City	Southampton
15:00 GMT (UTC±0)	Laporte 45+2' (o.g.)	Report	Sterling 12'; De Bruyne 62' (pen.); Steffen (yellow card) 72'; Foden 75'; Mahrez 78'	Stadium: St. Mary's Stadium; Attendance: 29,702; Referee: Mike Dean

16 April 2022 Semi-finals	Manchester City	2–3	Liverpool	Wembley
15:30 BST (UTC+1)	Gabriel Jesus (yellow card) 27'; Grealish 47'; Fernandinho (yellow card) 57'; Silva 90+1'	Report	Konaté 9'; Mané 17', 45', (yellow card) 61'; Fabinho (yellow card) 37'; Keïta (yellow card) 48'	Stadium: Wembley Stadium; Attendance: 73,793; Referee: Michael Oliver

=== EFL Cup ===
The draw for the third round was made on 25 August 2021 live on Sky Sports after the conclusion of the second round tie between West Bromwich Albion and Arsenal by Kevin Phillips and Kevin Campbell. City were drawn at home versus League One side Wycombe Wanderers. The draw for the fourth round was made on 22 September 2021 after the conclusion of the third round ties by Micah Richards and Harry Redknapp. City were drawn away to fellow Premier League side West Ham United, who had beaten Manchester United at Old Trafford in the third round.

21 September 2021 Third round	Manchester City	6–1	Wycombe Wanderers	Manchester
19:45 BST	De Bruyne 29'; Lavia (yellow card) 40'; Mahrez 43', 83'; Foden 45+1'; Torres 71'; Palmer 88'	Report	Hanlan 22'	Stadium: City of Manchester Stadium; Attendance: 30,959; Referee: Robert Jones

27 October 2021 Fourth round	West Ham United	0–0 (5–3 p)	Manchester City	Stratford
19:45 BST		Report		Stadium: London Stadium; Attendance: 60,000; Referee: Jonathan Moss
	Penalties
	Noble (penalty scored); Bowen (penalty scored); Dawson (penalty scored); Cresswell (penalty scored); Benrahma (penalty scored)		(penalty missed) Foden; (penalty scored) Cancelo; (penalty scored) Gabriel Jesus; (penalty scored) Grealish

=== FA Community Shield ===
7 August 2021 Final	Leicester City	1–0	Manchester City	Wembley
17:15 BST	Bertrand (yellow card) 50'; Iheanacho 89' (pen.)	Report	Dias (yellow card) 87'; Fernandinho (yellow card) 88'	Stadium: Wembley Stadium; Attendance: 45,602; Referee: Paul Tierney

=== UEFA Champions League ===
==== Group stage ====
The draw for the group stage was held on 26 August 2021 with the fixtures being announced a day later.

Pos	Team	Pld	W	D	L	GF	GA	GD	Pts	Qualification	MCI	PAR	RBL	BRU
1	(England) Manchester City	6	4	0	2	18	10	+8	12	Advance to knockout phase	—	2–1	6–3	4–1
2	(France) Paris Saint-Germain	6	3	2	1	13	8	+5	11	Advance to knockout phase	2–0	—	3–2	4–1
3	(Germany) RB Leipzig	6	2	1	3	15	14	+1	7	Transfer to Europa League	2–1	2–2	—	1–2
4	(Belgium) Club Brugge	6	1	1	4	6	20	−14	4		1–5	1–1	0–5	—

Source: UEFA
Rules for classification: Group stage tiebreakers

15 September 2021 1	Manchester City (England)	6–3	(Germany) RB Leipzig	Manchester, England
21:00 BST (UTC+2)	Zinchenko (yellow card) 12'; Aké 16'; Mukiele 28' (o.g.); Mahrez 45+2' (pen.); Grealish 56'; Cancelo 75'; Gabriel Jesus 86'	Report	Nkunku 42', 51', 73'; Klostermann (yellow card) 45+1'; Adams (yellow card) 49'; Angeliño (yellow card) 58' (yellow-red card) 79'	Stadium: City of Manchester Stadium; Attendance: 38,062; Referee: Serdar Gözübüyük (Netherlands)

28 September 2021 2	Paris Saint-Germain (France)	2–0	(England) Manchester City	Paris, France
21:00 CET (UTC+2)	Gueye 8'; Messi 74'; Verratti (yellow card) 77'	Report	Cancelo (yellow card) 24'; De Bruyne (yellow card) 39'	Stadium: Parc des Princes; Attendance: 37,350; Referee: Carlos del Cerro Grande (Spain)

19 October 2021 3	Club Brugge (Belgium)	1–5	(England) Manchester City	Bruges, Belgium
18:45 CEST (UTC+1)	Mata (yellow card) 24'; Nsoki (yellow card) 45'; Balanta (yellow card) 65'; Vanaken 81'	Report	Cancelo 30'; Laporte (yellow card) 32'; Mahrez 43' (pen.), 84'; Walker 53'; Palmer 67'	Stadium: Jan Breydel Stadium; Attendance: 24,915; Referee: István Kovács (Romania)

3 November 2021 4	Manchester City (England)	4–1	(Belgium) Club Brugge	Manchester, England
21:00 CET (UTC+1)	Foden 15'; Mahrez 54'; Sterling 72'; Gabriel Jesus 90+2'	Report	Stones 17' (o.g.)	Stadium: City of Manchester Stadium; Attendance: 50,228; Referee: Antonio Mateu Lahoz (Spain)

24 November 2021 5	Manchester City (England)	2–1	(France) Paris Saint-Germain	Manchester, England
20:00 GMT (UTC±0)	Rodri (yellow card) 55'; Sterling 63'; Gabriel Jesus 76', (yellow card) 90+3'; Cancelo (yellow card) 80'	Report	Mbappé 50'	Stadium: City of Manchester Stadium; Attendance: 52,030; Referee: Daniele Orsato (Italy)

7 December 2021 6	RB Leipzig (Germany)	2–1	(England) Manchester City	Leipzig, Germany
18:45 CEST (UTC+1)	Kampl (yellow card) 14'; Szoboszlai 24'; Silva 71'; Adams (yellow card) 90+1'	Report	De Bruyne (yellow card) 30'; Mahrez 76'; Stones (yellow card) 81'; Walker (red card) 82'	Stadium: Red Bull Arena; Attendance: 0 Referee: Sandro Schärer (Switzerland)

==== Knockout phase ====
===== Round of 16 =====
The draw for the round of 16 was held on 13 December 2021 at UEFA's headquarters in Nyon. An administrative error led to a first draw being declared null and void after a series of errors, including some seeded teams being allowed into the draw with runners-up from their own qualification groups. City had initially been drawn against Villarreal. The draw was subsequently redone three hours later and City were drawn against Sporting CP, who they had last met and lost on away goals to in the last 16 of the 2011–12 UEFA Europa League.

15 February 2022 First leg	Sporting CP (Portugal)	0–5	(England) Manchester City	Lisbon, Portugal
21:00 CET (UTC+1)	Nunes (yellow card) 65'; Esgaio (yellow card) 78'; Ugarte (yellow card) 83'	Report	Mahrez 7'; Silva 17', 44'; Foden 32'; Sterling 58'; Gündoğan (yellow card) 74'	Stadium: Estádio José Alvalade; Attendance: 48,129; Referee: Srđan Jovanović (Serbia)

9 March 2022 Second leg	Manchester City (England)	0–0 (5–0 agg.)	(Portugal) Sporting CP	Manchester, England
21:00 GMT (UTC±0)	Gabriel Jesus (yellow card) 39'	Report	Paulinho (yellow card) 15'; Slimani (yellow card) 40'	Stadium: City of Manchester Stadium; Attendance: 51,213; Referee: Halil Umut Meler (Turkey)

===== Quarter-finals =====
The draw for the quarter-finals was held on 18 March 2022. City were drawn against Atlético Madrid, against whom they had never played a competitive fixture before.

5 April 2022 First leg	Manchester City (England)	1–0	(Spain) Atlético Madrid	Manchester, England
20:00 BST (UTC+1)	De Bruyne 70'; Gabriel Jesus (yellow card) 85'; Ederson (yellow card) 90+2'	Report	De Paul (yellow card) 69'; Correa (yellow card) 83'; Vrsaljko (yellow card) 90+2'	Stadium: City of Manchester Stadium; Attendance: 52,018; Referee: István Kovács (Romania)

13 April 2022 Second leg	Atlético Madrid (Spain)	0–0 (0–1 agg.)	(England) Manchester City	Madrid, Spain
21:00 CEST (UTC+2)	Felipe (yellow card) 24' (yellow-red card) 90+1'; Llorente (yellow card) 80'; Savić (yellow card) 90+1'	Report	Rodri (yellow card) 85'; Aké (yellow card) 90+1'; Mahrez (yellow card) 90+5'; Foden (yellow card) 90+6'; Cancelo (yellow card) 90+7'	Stadium: Wanda Metropolitano; Attendance: 65,675; Referee: Daniel Siebert (Germany)

===== Semi-finals =====
The draw for the semi-finals was held on 18 March 2022, after the quarter-finals draw. City were paired with 13-time winners Real Madrid, with the two teams' record being two wins apiece and two draws.

26 April 2022 First leg	Manchester City (England)	4–3	(Spain) Real Madrid	Manchester, England
20:00 BST (UTC+1)	De Bruyne 2'; Gabriel Jesus 11'; Foden 53'; Silva 74'; Fernandinho (yellow card) 81'	Report	Benzema 33', 82' (pen.); Vinícius 55'; Nacho (yellow card) 90+3'	Stadium: City of Manchester Stadium; Attendance: 52,217; Referee: István Kovács (Romania)

4 May 2022 Second leg	Real Madrid (Spain)	3–1 (a.e.t.) (6–5 agg.)	(England) Manchester City	Madrid, Spain
21:00 CEST (UTC+2)	Modrić (yellow card) 9'; Carvajal (yellow card) 65'; Militão (yellow card) 84'; Rodrygo 90', 90+1'; Valverde (yellow card) 90+6'; Benzema 95' (pen.)	Report	Laporte (yellow card) 9'; Mahrez 73'; Sterling (yellow card) 101'; Zinchenko (yellow card) 113'	Stadium: Santiago Bernabéu; Attendance: 61,416; Referee: Daniele Orsato (Italy)

== Statistics ==
As of 22 May 2022

=== Overall ===
Appearances (Apps) numbers are for appearances in competitive games only, including sub appearances.
Red card numbers denote: numbers in parentheses represent red cards overturned for wrongful dismissal.
Source for all stats:

No.	Player	Pos.	Premier League				FA Cup				EFL Cup				Community Shield				Champions League				Total			
No.	Player	Pos.	Apps	Goal	Yellow card	Red card	Apps	Goal	Yellow card	Red card	Apps	Goal	Yellow card	Red card	Apps	Goal	Yellow card	Red card	Apps	Goal	Yellow card	Red card	Apps	Goal	Yellow card	Red card
2	(England) Kyle Walker	DF	20		1		3		2		1								7	1		1	31	1	3	1
3	(Portugal) Rúben Dias	DF	29	2	5		2								1		1		7				39	2	6	
5	(England) John Stones	DF	14	1			4	1			1								8		1		27	2	1	
6	(Netherlands) Nathan Aké	DF	14	2			5		1		1				1				6	1	1		27	3	2	
7	(England) Raheem Sterling	FW	30	13	1		3	1			2								12	3	1		47	17	2	
8	(Germany) İlkay Gündoğan	MF	27	8	1		4	2			1				1				10		1		42	10	2	
9	(Brazil) Gabriel Jesus	FW	28	8	1		4	1	1		1								8	4	3		41	13	5	
10	(England) Jack Grealish	MF	26	3	3		4	2			1				1				7	1			39	6	3	
11	(Ukraine) Oleksandr Zinchenko	DF	15				4				1								8		2		28		2	
13	(United States) Zack Steffen	GK	1				4		1		2				1				1				8		1	
14	(Spain) Aymeric Laporte	DF	33	4	5	1	2												9		2		44	4	7	1
16	(Spain) Rodri	MF	33	7	5		2		1						1				10		2		46	7	8	
17	(Belgium) Kevin De Bruyne	MF	30	15	2		3	1			2	1							10	2	2		45	19	4	
20	(Portugal) Bernardo Silva	MF	35	8	6		3	2							1				11	3			50	13	6	
22	(France) Benjamin Mendy	DF	1												1								2			
25	(Brazil) Fernandinho	MF	19	2	1		4		2		1				1		1		8		1		33	2	5	
26	(Algeria) Riyad Mahrez	FW	28	11			4	4			2	2			1				12	7	1		47	24	1	
27	(Portugal) João Cancelo	DF	36	1	7		5				1				1				9	2	3		52	3	10	
31	(Brazil) Ederson	GK	37		3		1												11		1		49		4	
33	(England) Scott Carson	GK																	1				1			
37	(Brazil) Kayky	FW	1				1																2			
47	(England) Phil Foden	MF	28	9	1		4	1			2	1							11	3	1		45	14	2	
48	(England) Liam Delap	FW	1				1												1				3			
53	(England) Samuel Edozie	FW													1								1			
56	(England) CJ Egan-Riley	DF	1								1								1				3			
79	(England) Luke Mbete	DF					1				1								1				3			
80	(England) Cole Palmer	MF	4				1	1			2	1			1				3	1			11	3		
87	(England) James McAtee	MF	2				2		1		1								1				6		1	
90	(Belgium) Romeo Lavia	MF					1				1		1										2		1	
94	(England) Finley Burns	DF									1												1			
96	(England) Ben Knight	MF													1								1			
97	(England) Josh Wilson-Esbrand	DF									1												1			
Sold	(Spain) Ferran Torres	FW	4	2							1	1			1				1				7	3		
Own goals				3																1				4		
Totals				99	42	1		16	9			6	1			0	2			29	22	1		150	76	2

=== Goalscorers ===
Includes all competitive matches. The list is sorted alphabetically by surname when total goals are equal.

Rank	No.	Pos.	Player	Premier League	FA Cup	EFL Cup	Community Shield	Champions League	Total
1	26	FW	(Algeria) Riyad Mahrez	11	4	2	0	7	24
2	17	MF	(Belgium) Kevin De Bruyne	15	1	1	0	2	19
3	7	FW	(England) Raheem Sterling	13	1	0	0	3	17
4	47	MF	(England) Phil Foden	9	1	1	0	3	14
5	9	FW	(Brazil) Gabriel Jesus	8	1	0	0	4	13
5	20	MF	(Portugal) Bernardo Silva	8	2	0	0	3	13
7	8	MF	(Germany) İlkay Gündoğan	8	2	0	0	0	10
8	16	MF	(Spain) Rodri	7	0	0	0	0	7
9	10	MF	(England) Jack Grealish	3	2	0	0	1	6
10	14	DF	(Spain) Aymeric Laporte	4	0	0	0	0	4
11	6	DF	(Netherlands) Nathan Aké	2	0	0	0	1	3
11	27	DF	(Portugal) João Cancelo	1	0	0	0	2	3
11	80	MF	(England) Cole Palmer	0	1	1	0	1	3
11	Sold	FW	(Spain) Ferran Torres	2	0	1	0	0	3
15	3	DF	(Portugal) Ruben Dias	2	0	0	0	0	2
15	25	MF	(Brazil) Fernandinho	2	0	0	0	0	2
15	5	DF	(England) John Stones	1	1	0	0	0	2
18	2	DF	(England) Kyle Walker	0	0	0	0	1	1
Own goals				3	0	0	0	1	4
Totals				99	16	6	0	29	150

=== Assists ===
Includes all competitive matches. The list is sorted alphabetically by surname when total assists are equal.

Rank	No.	Pos.	Player	Premier League	FA Cup	EFL Cup	Community Shield	Champions League	Total
1	17	MF	(Belgium) Kevin De Bruyne	8	3	0	0	3	14
2	47	MF	(England) Phil Foden	5	2	2	0	2	11
2	9	FW	(Brazil) Gabriel Jesus	8	2	0	0	1	11
4	27	DF	(Portugal) João Cancelo	7	0	0	0	3	10
4	26	FW	(Algeria) Riyad Mahrez	5	1	1	0	3	10
6	7	FW	(England) Raheem Sterling	5	0	1	0	2	8
7	20	MF	(Portugal) Bernardo Silva	4	0	0	0	3	7
8	8	MF	(Germany) İlkay Gündoğan	4	1	0	0	1	6
8	11	DF	(Ukraine) Oleksandr Zinchenko	4	0	0	0	2	6
10	3	DF	(Portugal) Ruben Dias	4	0	0	0	1	5
11	10	MF	(England) Jack Grealish	3	0	0	0	1	4
12	25	MF	(Brazil) Fernandinho	1	0	0	0	2	3
13	16	MF	(Spain) Rodri	2	0	0	0	0	2
13	2	DF	(England) Kyle Walker	2	0	0	0	0	2
14	79	DF	(England) Luke Mbete	0	0	1	0	0	1
14	80	MF	(England) Cole Palmer	0	1	0	0	0	1
14	Sold	FW	(Spain) Ferran Torres	1	0	0	0	0	1
14	97	DF	(England) Josh Wilson-Esbrand	0	0	1	0	0	1
Totals				63	10	6	0	24	103

=== Hat-tricks ===
Player	Against	Result	Date	Competition	Ref
(England) Raheem Sterling	Norwich City	4–0 (A)	12 February 2022	Premier League	
(Brazil) Gabriel Jesus^{4}	Watford	5–1 (H)	23 April 2022	Premier League	
(Belgium) Kevin De Bruyne^{4}	Wolves	5–1 (A)	11 May 2022	Premier League	

^{4} – Player scored four goals.

=== Clean sheets ===
The list is sorted by shirt number when total clean sheets are equal. Numbers in parentheses represent games where both goalkeepers participated and both kept a clean sheet; the number in parentheses is awarded to the goalkeeper who was substituted on, whilst a full clean sheet is awarded to the goalkeeper who was on the field at the start of play.

				Clean sheets					
No.	Player	Games Played	Goals Against	Premier League	FA Cup	EFL Cup	Community Shield	Champions League	Total
31	(Brazil) Ederson	49	40	20	1	0	0	4	25
13	(United States) Zack Steffen	9	10	1	0	1	0	0	2
33	(England) Scott Carson	1	0					(1)	(1)
Totals			50	21	1	1	0	4	27

== Awards ==
In the end of season awards, Kevin De Bruyne won Premier League Player of the Season for the second time, and the club's own Player of the Season award for the fourth time, equalling the club record; Phil Foden won Premier League Young Player of the Season and the PFA Young Player of the Year, both for the second consecutive season; while Ederson won the Premier League Golden Glove for the third consecutive season, this time sharing the award with Liverpool's first choice keeper Alisson (both were on 20 clean sheets). Three City players were also included in the PFA Team of the Year (Cancelo, De Bruyne and Silva).

=== Premier League Player of the Season ===
Awarded by a vote of a shortlist on the Premier League website.

Player	Ref.
(Belgium) Kevin De Bruyne	

=== PFA Young Player of the Year ===
Player	Ref.
(England) Phil Foden	

=== Premier League Young Player of the Season ===
Awarded by a vote of a shortlist on the Premier League website.

Player	Ref.
(England) Phil Foden	

=== Premier League Golden Glove ===
Player	Clean sheets	Ref.
(Brazil) Ederson†	20	

† shared with Alisson

=== PFA Team of the Year ===
Pos.	Player	Ref.
DF	(Portugal) João Cancelo	
MF	(Belgium) Kevin De Bruyne	
MF	(Portugal) Bernardo Silva	

=== Etihad Player of the Year ===
Awarded by a vote of a shortlist on the Manchester City website.

Player	Ref.
(Belgium) Kevin De Bruyne	

This was De Bruyne's fourth player of the year award, equalling a club record by Richard Dunne.

=== UEFA Champions League Team of the Season ===
Selected by UEFA's technical study group.

Pos.	Player	Ref.
MF	(Belgium) Kevin De Bruyne	

=== Etihad Player of the Month ===
Awarded by an online vote by supporters on the official Manchester City F.C. website.

Month	Player	Ref.
August	(Brazil) Gabriel Jesus	
September	(Portugal) Bernardo Silva	
October	(Portugal) Bernardo Silva	
November (Note: Bernardo Silva became the first ever City player to win three consecutive club player of the month awards.)	(Portugal) Bernardo Silva	
December	(Algeria) Riyad Mahrez	
January	(Belgium) Kevin De Bruyne	
February	(Algeria) Riyad Mahrez	
March	(Belgium) Kevin De Bruyne	
April	(Belgium) Kevin De Bruyne	

=== Premier League Player of the Month ===
Month	Player	Ref.
December (Note: This was Sterling's third PL POTM award and his first since November 2018.)	(England) Raheem Sterling	

=== Premier League Manager of the Month ===
Month	Manager	Ref.
November	(Spain) Pep Guardiola	
December (Note: These were Guardiola's tenth and eleventh PL MOTM awards, taking him to third place on the all-time list of winners, behind Arsène Wenger and Alex Ferguson.)	(Spain) Pep Guardiola	

=== Premier League Goal of the Month ===
Month	Player	Score	Opponents	Date	Ref.
November	(Spain) Rodri	2–0	Everton	21 November 2021	

=== LMA Performance of the Week ===
Awarded by a panel of LMA members and football experts.

Date	Match	Result	Ref.
25 September (Note: This was City's first award since the 2018–19 season, when they beat Liverpool 2–1 at home in January 2019.)	vs Chelsea (A)	Won 1–0	
14 December	vs Leeds United (H)	Won 7–0	

== See also ==
- 2021–22 in English football
- List of Manchester City F.C. seasons
