= Miguel Silva =

Miguel Silva may refer to

- Miguel Silva (footballer, born April 1995), Portuguese footballer
- Miguel Silva (footballer, born December 1995), Portuguese footballer
- Miguel Silva (Venezuelan footballer) (born 2000), Venezuelan footballer
