= Jonathan González =

Jonathan González may refer to:

- Jonathan González Ortiz (born 1989), Puerto Rican welterweight boxer
- Jonathan González (flyweight) (born 1991), Puerto Rican boxer
- Jonathan González (footballer, born 1995), Ecuadorian footballer
- Jonathan González (footballer, born 1999), Mexican footballer
- Jonathan González (footballer, born 2000), Uruguayan footballer
