= Luis Franco =

Luis Franco may refer to:

- Luis Franco (writer) (1898–1988), Argentine writer, essayist and poet
- Luis Franco (boxer) (born 1982), Cuban boxer
- Luis Ernesto Franco (born 1983), Mexican actor
- Luis Franco (Mexican footballer) (born 1993), Mexican football midfielder
- Luis Franco (Paraguayan footballer) (born 1999), Paraguayan football goalkeeper
