= Jorge Murrugarra =

Peruvian footballer (born 1997)

Personal information
- Full name: Jorge Salvador Murrugarra Torres
- Date of birth: 22 March 1997 (age 29)
- Place of birth: Lima, Perú
- Height: 1.77 m (5 ft 10 in)
- Position: Midfielder

Team information
- Current team: Universitario
- Number: 23

Youth career
- 2012–2014: Juventud Progreso
- 2015: Sporting Cristal

Senior career*
Years	Team	Apps	(Gls)
2016	Deportivo Coopsol	11	(0)
2017–2019	UTC	80	(0)
2020	Ayacucho	27	(0)
2021–	Universitario	133	(0)

International career^{‡}
2020	Peru U23	1	(0)
2024–	Peru	2	(0)
- * Club domestic league appearances and goals as of 23:21, 25 August 2025 (UTC) ‡ National team caps and goals as of 03:12, 19 November 2026 (UTC)

Jorge Salvador Murrugarra Torres (born 22 March 1997) is a Peruvian footballer who plays as a midfielder for Peruvian Liga 1 club Universitario de Deportes and the Peru national team.

== Club career ==
Murrugarra played in the youth ranks of Juventud Progreso, a team in the District League of Barranca in the Copa Perú, from 2012 to 2014. He then moved to Sporting Cristal, where he played the 2015 Torneo de Promoción y Reservas but was unable to make his professional debut.

In 2016, Murrugarra was signed by Deportivo Coopsol from the Peruvian Segunda División, making his professional debut with the team on 14 August 2016, in a 1–1 tie against Alianza Universidad. As a 19 year old, he played a total of 12 matches in his first professional season.

Murrugarra was then signed by Universidad Técnica de Cajamarca, from the Torneo Descentralizado, for the 2017 season, making his debut with the team on 26 May 2017, coming from the bench in a 3–0 victory against Juan Aurich. From then on, Murrugarra became a starting player in UTC's midfield, finishing the year with a total of 25 matches. He was also considered the best new player in the team, which managed to qualify to the 2018 Copa Sudamericana first stage. The following season, Murrugarra remained an undisputed starter in UTC's midfield, next to Benjamín Ubierna, and played a total of 32 matches. In January 2019, he renewed his contract with the team for one more season, in which he once more played in the Copa Sudamericana first stage.

In December 2019, Murrugarra signed for Ayacucho FC with a contract for one season, on request by his former UTC manager Gerardo Ameli, making his debut on 7 February 2020, coming from the bench in a 2–1 victory against Sport Boys. That year, Murrugarra was part of Ayacucho's historic Fase 2 win, after defeating Sporting Cristal in the final, and played a total of 23 matches, giving 2 assists. His good performances throughout the season led to him catching the attention of the technical staff of Ángel Comizzo, manager of Universitario de Deportes.

In January 2021, Murrugarra was announced as a new signing of Universitario with a contract for one season and a half, in order to play both the Liga 1 and the Copa Libertadores. He played his first game with la U on matchday 1, in a 1–1 tie against FBC Melgar. Throughout the season, Murrugarra became a key player for Universitario, which managed to qualify for the 2022 Copa Libertadores qualifying stages. In June 2022, he renewed his contract until the end of that year. In 2023, he won his first national championship after defeating Alianza Lima in the 2023 Liga 1 finals.

== International career ==
Murrugarra was called up for Peru at the U23 level for the 2020 CONMEBOL Pre-Olympic Tournament. He made his professional debut with the senior team in October 2024, in a 4–0 loss against Brazil for the 2026 World Cup CONMEBOL qualification.

== Career statistics ==
=== Club ===
As of match played 21 March 2026.

Club	Season	League		Cup		Continental		Total	
Club	Season	Apps	Goals	Apps	Goals	Apps	Goals	Apps	Goals
Deportivo Coopsol	2016	13	0	0	0	0	0	13	0
UTC	2017	25	0	0	0	0	0	25	0
UTC	2018	32	0	0	0	1	0	33	0
UTC	2019	23	0	2	0	0	0	25	0
UTC	Total	80	0	2	0	1	0	83	0
Ayacucho	2020	27	0	0	0	0	0	27	0
Universitario de Deportes	2021	19	0	1	0	5	0	25	0
Universitario de Deportes	2022	22	0	0	0	1	0	23	0
Universitario de Deportes	2023	22	0	0	0	5	0	27	0
Universitario de Deportes	2024	23	0	0	0	6	0	29	0
Universitario de Deportes	2025	22	0	0	0	8	0	30	0
Universitario de Deportes	2026	5	0	0	0	0	0	5	0
Universitario de Deportes	Total	113	0	1	0	25	0	139	0
Career total		233	0	3	0	26	0	262	0

=== International ===
As of match played 21 December 2025

Appearances and goals by national team and year
National team	Year	Apps	Goals
Peru	2024	1	0
Peru	2025	1	0
Total		2	0

== Honours ==
Universitario de Deportes

- Liga 1: 2023, 2024, 2025

Ayacucho FC

- Fase 2 2020 (Clausura)
