= Wilbert Hernández =

Venezuelan footballer (born 2001)

Personal information
- Full name: Wilbert Miguel Hernández Torrealba
- Date of birth: 2 March 2001 (age 25)
- Place of birth: Araure, Venezuela
- Height: 1.85 m (6 ft 1 in)
- Position: Goalkeeper

Team information
- Current team: Caracas
- Number: 23

Youth career
- Caracas

Senior career*
Years	Team	Apps	(Gls)
2018–	Caracas	25	(0)
- * Club domestic league appearances and goals as of 18:27, 17 June 2021 (UTC)

Wilbert Miguel Hernández Torrealba (born 2 March 2001) is a Venezuelan footballer who plays as a goalkeeper for Caracas.

== Career statistics ==
=== Club ===
As of 11 January 2020.

Club	Season	League			Cup		Continental		Other		Total	
Club	Season	Division	Apps	Goals	Apps	Goals	Apps	Goals	Apps	Goals	Apps	Goals
Caracas	2018	Venezuelan Primera División	2	0	0	0	0	0	0	0	2	0
Caracas	2019	Venezuelan Primera División	0	0	0	0	0	0	0	0	0	0
Career total			2	0	0	0	0	0	0	0	2	0
