= Jonathan González (footballer, born 2000) =

Uruguayan footballer

Personal information
- Full name: Jonathan Shaquille González Álvarez
- Date of birth: 22 June 2000 (age 26)
- Place of birth: Montevideo, Uruguay
- Height: 1.78 m (5 ft 10 in)
- Position: Defender

Youth career
- Defensor Sporting

Senior career*
Years	Team	Apps	(Gls)
2019–2020	Defensor Sporting	26	(1)
2021	Villa Española	10	(0)

International career
2014–2015	Uruguay U15	20	(2)
2016–2017	Uruguay U17	24	(1)
Medal record
Representing Uruguay
South American U-15 Championship
Runner-up	2015 Colombia
- * Club domestic league appearances and goals as of 24 June 2022

Jonathan Shaquille González Álvarez (born 22 June 2000) is a Uruguayan professional footballer who plays as a defender.

== Club career ==
A youth academy graduate of Defensor, González made his professional debut on 16 March 2019 in a 6–2 league defeat against Liverpool. He netted his first goal on 6 November 2019 in a 4–1 defeat against Plaza Colonia.

== International career ==
González is a former Uruguay youth international and has represented his nation at under-15 and under-17 levels. He was part of squad which finished as runners-up at 2015 South American U-15 Championship.

On 10 January 2020, he was called up to Uruguay U23 team for 2020 CONMEBOL Pre-Olympic Tournament to replace injured Emiliano Ancheta.
