= Renato Solís =

Peruvian association football player

Personal information
- Full name: Renato Alfredo Solís Salinas
- Date of birth: 28 January 1998 (age 28)
- Place of birth: Lima, Peru
- Height: 1.87 m (6 ft 2 in)
- Position: Goalkeeper

Team information
- Current team: Sporting Cristal
- Number: 12

Youth career
- Regatas Lima
- Sporting Cristal

Senior career*
Years	Team	Apps	(Gls)
2019–	Sporting Cristal	97	(0)

International career
2020	Peru U23	4	(0)
- * Club domestic league appearances and goals as of 16:48, 4 October 2024 (UTC)

Renato Alfredo Solís Salinas (born 27 January 1998) is a Peruvian footballer who plays as a goalkeeper for Sporting Cristal. He has made over 100 total appearances for the club, winning the Peruvian Primera División in 2020, and has been called up by the Peru national team.

== Club career ==
Born in Lima, Solís was a youth player at Regatas Lima. Aged 15, he moved to Sporting Cristal, choosing them over fellow capital-based clubs Alianza Lima and Universitario.

Solís made his professional debut in the Peruvian Primera División on 6 April 2019 in a 2–0 loss at Ayacucho, with Sporting Cristal resting several players who had played recently in the Copa Libertadores. Due to regular goalkeeper Patricio Álvarez's poor form at the end of the season and the start of the new year, Solís was made first choice. He made his continental debut in the Copa Libertadores on 13 February 2020 in a 2–1 home win over Ecuador's Barcelona S.C. in the second round, though his team were eliminated due to a 4–0 loss with Álvarez in the first leg. He ended the season a league champion, with 32 goals conceded over 27 games.

Sporting Cristal signed Alejandro Duarte in 2021, who became the regular goalkeeper until being injured in early 2023, and Solís recovered his position. On 25 May, he saved a penalty kick from Miguel Borja in a 1–1 home draw with Argentina's River Plate in the group stage of the Copa Libertadores. In November 2023, with his contract set to expire, it was extended to last through 2026.

In May 2024, Solís had a knee injury, with Diego Enríquez taking over as goalkeeper in his absence.

== International career ==
Solís was called up for the Peru under-23 team for the 2020 CONMEBOL Pre-Olympic Tournament in Colombia, playing all four games. He accepted responsibility for conceding the only goal of the first game against Brazil, from Paulinho.

Manager Ricardo Gareca called up Solís for two 2022 FIFA World Cup qualifiers in November 2020, against Chile and Argentina. This was after Carlos Cáceda had been sent off in the previous qualifier against Brazil, albeit from the substitutes' bench.

== Career statistics ==
As of match played 18 May 2024

Appearances and goals by club, season and competition
Club	Season	League			Cup		Continental		Total	
Club	Season	Division	Apps	Goals	Apps	Goals	Apps	Goals	Apps	Goals
Sporting Cristal	2016	Peruvian Primera División	0	0	—		0	0	0	0
Sporting Cristal	2017	Peruvian Primera División	0	0	—		0	0	0	0
Sporting Cristal	2018	Peruvian Primera División	0	0	—		0	0	0	0
Sporting Cristal	2019	Peruvian Primera División	9	0	—		0	0	9	0
Sporting Cristal	2020	Peruvian Primera División	27	0	—		1	0	28	0
Sporting Cristal	2021	Peruvian Primera División	5	0	—		0	0	5	0
Sporting Cristal	2022	Peruvian Primera División	11	0	—		0	0	11	0
Sporting Cristal	2023	Peruvian Primera División	29	0	—		12	0	41	0
Sporting Cristal	2024	Peruvian Primera División	16	0	—		2	0	18	0
Career total			97	0	0	0	15	0	112	0
