= Maximiliano Centurión =

Argentine footballer

Personal information
- Full name: Maximiliano Tomás Centurión
- Date of birth: 20 February 1999 (age 27)
- Place of birth: Pablo Podestá, Argentina
- Height: 1.92 m (6 ft 4 in)
- Position: Centre-back

Team information
- Current team: Sportivo Trinidense
- Number: 26

Youth career
- Vélez Sarsfield
- Argentinos Juniors

Senior career*
Years	Team	Apps	(Gls)
2019–2021	Argentinos Juniors	2	(0)
2021	Sud América	4	(0)
2022	Defensores de Belgrano	32	(1)
2023–2024	Arsenal de Sarandí	22	(0)
2024	Sud América	12	(0)
2025–	Sportivo Trinidense	3	(0)

International career
2019	Argentina U20	2	(0)
2020	Argentina U23	1	(0)
- * Club domestic league appearances and goals as of 12 August 2025

Maximiliano Tomás Centurión (born 20 February 1999) is an Argentine footballer currently playing as a centre-back for Sportivo Trinidense in the Paraguayan Primera División.

== Career statistics ==
=== Club ===
As of 11 January 2020.

Club	Season	League			Cup		Continental		Other		Total	
Club	Season	Division	Apps	Goals	Apps	Goals	Apps	Goals	Apps	Goals	Apps	Goals
Argentinos Juniors	2019–20	Argentine Primera División	1	0	0	0	0	0	0	0	1	0
Career total			1	0	0	0	0	0	0	0	1	0
