= Miguel Silva (Venezuelan footballer) =

Venezuelan footballer (born 2000)

Personal information
- Full name: Miguel Alejandro Silva Jaimes
- Date of birth: July 9, 2000 (age 26)
- Place of birth: Maracay, Venezuela
- Height: 1.83 m (6 ft 0 in)
- Position: Goalkeeper

Team information
- Current team: Carabobo

Senior career*
Years	Team	Apps	(Gls)
2017–2019	Deportivo La Guaira	0	(0)
2018	→ Metropolitanos (loan)	14	(0)
2019	New York Red Bulls II	0	(0)
2021–2023	Academia Puerto Cabello	46	(0)
2024–2025	Universidad Central	64	(0)
2026	Fortaleza	15	(0)
2026-	Carabobo	3	(0)

International career^{‡}
2018	Venezuela U20	6	(0)
2018	Venezuela U21	1	(0)
- * Club domestic league appearances and goals as of 14:11, 11 January 2020 (UTC) ‡ National team caps and goals as of 14:11, 11 January 2020 (UTC)

Miguel Alejandro Silva Jaimes (born 9 July 2000) is a Venezuelan footballer who plays as a goalkeeper for Carabobo.

== Career ==
Silva signed his first professional contract with Deportivo La Guaira when he was 16 years old. For the 2018 season he was loaned to Metropolitanos. In his one season at the club, he appeared in 14 league matches.

During May 2019 he signed with New York Red Bulls II of the USL Championship.

== Career statistics ==
=== Club ===
As of 11 January 2020.

Club	Season	League			Cup		Continental		Other		Total	
Club	Season	Division	Apps	Goals	Apps	Goals	Apps	Goals	Apps	Goals	Apps	Goals
Deportivo La Guaira	2017	Venezuelan Primera División	0	0	0	0	–		0	0	0	0
Deportivo La Guaira	2018	Venezuelan Primera División	0	0	0	0	–		0	0	0	0
Deportivo La Guaira	2019	Venezuelan Primera División	0	0	0	0	–		0	0	0	0
Deportivo La Guaira	Total		0	0	0	0	0	0	0	0	0	0
Metropolitanos (loan)	2018	Venezuelan Primera División	14	0	0	0	–		0	0	14	0
New York Red Bulls II	2019	USL Championship	0	0	0	0	–		0	0	0	0
Career total			14	0	0	0	0	0	0	0	14	0
