= Emiliano Ancheta =

Uruguayan footballer (born 1999)

Personal information
- Full name: Emiliano Ancheta Da Rosa
- Date of birth: 9 June 1999 (age 27)
- Place of birth: Montevideo, Uruguay
- Height: 1.79 m (5 ft 10 in)
- Position: Right-back

Team information
- Current team: Nacional
- Number: 13

Youth career
- Danubio

Senior career*
Years	Team	Apps	(Gls)
2018–2020	Danubio	37	(0)
2021	Cerro Largo	1	(0)
2022	Albion	35	(1)
2023	La Luz	30	(0)
2024	Danubio	20	(0)
2025–	Nacional	22	(1)

International career^{‡}
2017	Uruguay U18	2	(0)
2018–2019	Uruguay U20	27	(0)
2019	Uruguay U22	1	(0)
2020	Uruguay U23	1	(0)
2024–	Uruguay local	1	(0)
- * Club domestic league appearances and goals as of 1 October 2025 ‡ National team caps and goals as of 5 December 2024

Emiliano Ancheta Da Rosa (born 9 June 1999) is a Uruguayan professional footballer who plays as right-back for Uruguayan Primera División club Nacional.

== International career ==
As a youth international, Ancheta has represented Uruguay at the 2019 South American U-20 Championship, 2019 FIFA U-20 World Cup and the 2019 Pan American Games.
