= Luis Franco (Paraguayan footballer) =

Paraguayan footballer (born 1999)

Personal information
- Full name: Luis Hernán Franco Fariña
- Date of birth: 10 April 1999 (age 27)
- Place of birth: Ciudad del Este, Paraguay
- Height: 1.93 m (6 ft 4 in)
- Position: Goalkeeper

Youth career
- Sol de América

Senior career*
Years	Team	Apps	(Gls)
2019–2023	Sol de América	10	(0)
2024	Deportivo Santaní		
- Fernando de la mora
- Resistencia
- Sportivo san lorenzo
- * Club domestic league appearances and goals as of 20:04, 21 October 2023 (UTC)

Luis Hernán Franco Fariña (born 10 April 1999) is a Paraguayan footballer who plays as a goalkeeper.

== Career ==
=== Club career ===
Franco was born in Ciudad del Este and is a product of Sol de América. Three days after his 20th birthday, he got his official debut for the club in the Paraguayan Primera División against Club Olimpia. Goalkeeper Rubén Escobar was sent off, after having committed a penalty in the 41st minute. Franco couldn't do anything to stop the goal and América lost 0–4. Franco also got the chance in the following three games, of which they won one and lost two.

In the 2020 season, Franco was used in five games where he conceded 12 goals.

Ahead of the 2024 season, Franco joined Paraguayan División Intermedia side Deportivo Santaní.
