= Kluiverth Aguilar =

Peruvian footballer (born 2003)

Personal information
- Full name: Kluiverth Miguel Aguilar Díaz
- Date of birth: 5 May 2003 (age 23)
- Place of birth: Lima, Peru
- Height: 1.78 m (5 ft 10 in)
- Position: Defender

Team information
- Current team: Minnesota United FC 2

Youth career
- –2019: Sporting Cristal

Senior career*
Years	Team	Apps	(Gls)
2019–2021	Alianza Lima	33	(2)
2021–2022	Manchester City	0	(0)
2021–2022	→ Lommel (loan)	3	(0)
2022–2026	Lommel	45	(1)
2026–	Minnesota United FC 2	0	(0)

International career^{‡}
2019	Peru U17	9	(0)
2020–2023	Peru U20	12	(0)
2020	Peru U23	1	(0)
- * Club domestic league appearances and goals as of 8 August 2026 ‡ National team caps and goals as of 25 January 2023

Kluiverth Miguel Aguilar Díaz (born 5 May 2003) is a Peruvian professional footballer who plays as a defender for American club Minnesota United FC 2 in the MLS Next Pro.

== Club career ==
He was included in The Guardian's "Next Generation 2020". On 19 April 2020, it was confirmed that Aguilar would join Manchester City for a fee of £1.5 million when he turns 18, in 2021. He spent a season on loan at City's partner club Lommel before signing for the Belgian club permanently in the summer of 2022.

On 14 August 2026, Aguilar signed with Minnesota United FC 2 in the MLS Next Pro until the end of 2026.

== Career statistics ==
As of 17 August 2023

Club	Season	League			Cup		Continental		Other		Total	
Club	Season	Division	Apps	Goals	Apps	Goals	Apps	Goals	Apps	Goals	Apps	Goals
Alianza Lima	2019	Liga 1	7	0	0	0	0	0	0	0	7	0
Alianza Lima	2020	Liga 1	18	2	0	0	2 (Note: Appearances in the Copa Libertadores)	0	0	0	20	2
Alianza Lima	2021	Liga 1	8	0	0	0	0	0	0	0	8	0
Alianza Lima	Total		33	2	0	0	2	0	0	0	35	2
Lommel (loan)	2021–22	First Division B	3	0	2	0	–		0	0	5	0
Lommel	2022–23	Challenger Pro League	4	0	0	0	—		0	0	4	0
Lommel	2023–24	Challenger Pro League	1	0	0	0	—		0	0	1	0
Career total			41	2	2	0	2	0	0	0	45	2
