= 2015–16 River Plate Montevideo season =

River Plate
2015–16 season
- President: (Uruguay) Renzo Gatto
- Head coach: (Uruguay) Juan Ramón Carrasco
- Stadium: Estadio Saroldi
- 2016 Copa Libertadores: Group stage
- Top goalscorer: League: Michael Santos, 11 goals All: Michael Santos, 15 goals
Home colours	Away colours	Third colours

River Plate is taking part of the 2015–16 season in the Uruguayan Primera División. They also took part in the 2016 Copa Libertadores, reaching the group stage.

== Transfer Window ==
=== Winter 2015 ===
==== In ====
Position	Nationality	Name	Age	From	Fee	Transfer Window	Ref.
MF	(Uruguay)	Martín Alaníz	22	(Mexico) Morelia	Loan return	Winter	tenfield.com.uy
DF	(Uruguay)	Darío Flores	31	(Italy) Matera	Transfer	Winter	tenfield.com.uy
DF	(Brazil)	Ronaldo Conceição	28	El Tanque Sisley	Loan return	Winter	tenfield.com.uy
MF	(Uruguay)	Cristian Pérez	25	MCT	Transfer	Winter	tenfield.com.uy
FW	(Brazil)	Wellington Baroni	26	(Brazil) J. Malucelli Futebol	Transfer	Winter	tenfield.com.uy

==== Out ====
Position	Nationality	Name	Age	To	Fee	Transfer Window	Ref.
MF	(Brazil)	Gabriel Marques	27	(Ecuador) Barcelona	Transfer	Winter	eluniverso.com
DF	(Uruguay)	Mauricio Prieto	27	(Chile) Santiago Wanderers	Transfer	Winter	tenfield.com.uy
FW	(Uruguay)	Leandro Rodríguez	22	(England) Everton	Transfer	Winter	ovaciondigital.com.uy
MF	(Uruguay)	Claudio Inella	23	Sud América	Free agent	Winter	tenfield.com.uy
MF	(Uruguay)	Fabián Bastidas	21	Villa Teresa	Free agent	Winter	tenfield.com.uy
MF	(Uruguay)	Héber Ignacio Ratti	21	N/A	Free agent	Winter	tenfield.com.uy
DF	(Uruguay)	Cristian Maciel	23	N/A	Free agent	Winter	tenfield.com.uy

=== Summer 2016 ===
==== In ====
Position	Nationality	Name	Age	From	Fee	Transfer Window	Ref.
FW	(Uruguay)	Federico Pintos	23	-	Free agent	Summer	tenfield.com.uy
DF	(Colombia)	César Tajan	24	Central Español	Transfer	Summer	tenfield.com.uy
MF	(Uruguay)	Pablo González	?	-	Reserve team	Summer	tenfield.com.uy
FW	(Brazil)	Emilton Pedroso	22	Albion	Transfer	Summer	tenfield.com.uy
MF	(Uruguay)	Mario Leguizamón	33	Villa Española	Free agent	Summer	tenfield.com.uy
MF	(Uruguay)	Matías Jones	24	(Argentina) San Martín	Free agent	Summer	tenfield.com.uy
FW	(Uruguay)	Sebastián Ribas	27	Fénix	Free Agent	Summer	tenfield.com.uy

==== Out ====
Position	Nationality	Name	Age	To	Fee	Transfer Window	Ref.
FW	(Uruguay)	Martín Alaníz	22	(Brazil) Chapecoense	Transfer	Summer	tenfield.com.uy
MF	(Uruguay)	Luis Torrecilla	26	Liverpool F.C. (Montevideo)	Free agent	Summer	tenfield.com.uy
DF	(Brazil)	Wellington Baroni	26	-	Free agent	Summer	tenfield.com.uy
FW	(France)	Walter Vaz	25	El Tanque Sisley	Free agent	Summer	tenfield.com.uy
FW	(Uruguay)	Cristian Techera	23	(Canada) Vancouver Whitecaps	Transfer	Summer	whitecapsfc.com
FW	(Uruguay)	Santiago García	25	(Argentina) Godoy Cruz	Transfer	Summer	diariouno.com.ar

== Squad ==
=== First Team ===
As of 19 February 2016

Note: Flags indicate national team as defined under FIFA eligibility rules; some limited exceptions apply. Players may hold more than one non-FIFA nationality.

No.	Pos.	Nation	Player
1	GK	URU	Nicola Pérez
2	DF	URU	Agustín Ale
3	DF	BRA	Ronaldo Conceição
4	MF	URU	Federico Pintos
5	DF	URU	Darío Flores
6	DF	URU	Cristian González (captain)
7	MF	URU	Bruno Montelongo
8	MF	URU	Fernando Gorriarán
9	FW	URU	Nicolás Schiappacasse
10	FW	URU	Michael Santos
11	FW	URU	Jonathan Ramírez
12	GK	URU	Juan Tinaglini
13	MF	URU	Diego Vicente
14	DF	URU	Lucas Ruiz
15	MF	URU	Robert Flores
16	FW	COL	César Taján

No.	Pos.	Nation	Player
17	MF	URU	Ángel Rodríguez
18	FW	BRA	Emilton Pedroso
19	DF	URU	Diego Rodríguez
20	DF	URU	Giovanni González
21	FW	URU	Alexander Rosso
22	DF	URU	Claudio Herrera
23	FW	URU	Santiago Ciganda
24	MF	URU	Mario Leguizamón
25	GK	URU	Gastón Olveira
26	DF	URU	Esteban Mascareña
27	MF	URU	Facundo Vigo
28	MF	URU	Pablo González
29	FW	URU	Sebastián Ribas
30	MF	URU	Matías Jones
31	FW	URU	Nicolás Machado
32	DF	URU	Elías González

=== Out on loan ===
Note: Flags indicate national team as defined under FIFA eligibility rules; some limited exceptions apply. Players may hold more than one non-FIFA nationality.

No.	Pos.	Nation	Player
—	GK	URU	Danilo Suárez (at (Uruguay) Miramar Misiones)
—	DF	BRA	Gabriel Marques (at (Ecuador) Barcelona Guayaquil)
—	DF	URU	Lucas Olaza (at (Spain) Celta de Vigo B)
—	MF	URU	Claudio Inella (at (Uruguay) Sud América)
—	MF	URU	Cristhian Maciel (at (Uruguay) Tacuarembó)
—	MF	URU	Christian Pérez (at (Uruguay) Rampla Juniors)

No.	Pos.	Nation	Player
—	MF	URU	Christian Serrón (at (Uruguay) Rampla Juniors)
—	MF	USA	Fabián Bastidas (at (Uruguay) Villa Teresa)
—	FW	URU	Martín Alaníz (at (Brazil) Chapecoense)
—	FW	URU	Diego Casas (at (Uruguay) Villa Española)
—	FW	URU	Francis D'Albenas (at (Colombia) Patriotas Boyacá)

=== Top scorers ===
Last update on May 31, 2016

Rank	Pos.	No.	Name	Primera División	Copa Libertadores	Total
1	FW	10	(Uruguay) Michael Santos	11	4	15
2	FW	9	(Uruguay) Santiago García	10	N/A	10
3	MF	7	(Uruguay) Bruno Montelongo	5	1	6
4	FW	30	(Uruguay) Nicolás Schiappacasse	3	0	3
4	DF	3	(Brazil) Ronaldo Conceição	3	0	3
4	FW	21	(Uruguay) Alexander Rosso	3	0	3
5	FW	18	(Uruguay) Martín Alaníz	2	N/A	2
5	FW	16	(Colombia) César Taján	1	1	2
6	DF	8	(Uruguay) Luis Torrecilla	1	N/A	1
6	MF	27	(Uruguay) Fernando Gorriarán	1	0	1
6	FW	23	(Uruguay) Santiago Ciganda	1	0	1
6	FW	30	(Uruguay) Sebastián Ribas	1	0	1
6	FW	17	(Uruguay) Ángel Rodríguez	1	0	1
-	Own goals	-	-	3	2	5
Total				43	8	51

=== Disciplinary record ===
Last updated on May 31, 2016

No.	Pos	Nat	Name	Primera División			Copa Libertadores			Total		
No.	Pos	Nat	Name	Booked	(yellow card) (yellow-red card)	Sent off (straight red)	Booked	(yellow card) (yellow-red card)	Sent off (straight red)	Booked	(yellow card) (yellow-red card)	Sent off (straight red)
Goalkeepers
Defenders
2	DF	(Uruguay)	Agustín Ale	5	0	1	0	0	0	5	0	1
3	DF	(Brazil)	Ronaldo Conceição	7	0	0	3	0	0	10	0	0
5	DF	(Uruguay)	Darío Flores	4	0	0	2	0	0	6	0	0
6	DF	(Uruguay)	Cristian González	4	1	0	3	0	0	7	1	0
14	DF	(Uruguay)	Lucas Ruiz	1	0	0	0	0	0	1	0	0
19	DF	(Uruguay)	Diego Rodríguez	4	0	0	0	0	0	4	0	0
20	DF	(Uruguay)	Giovanni González	3	0	0	1	0	0	4	0	0
22	DF	(Uruguay)	Iván Silva	1	0	0	0	0	0	1	0	0
22	DF	(Uruguay)	Claudio Herrera	5	0	0	1	0	0	6	0	0
Midfielders
4	MF	(Uruguay)	Federico Pintos	1	0	0	1	0	0	2	0	0
7	MF	(Uruguay)	Bruno Montelongo	2	0	0	0	0	0	2	0	0
13	MF	(Uruguay)	Diego Vicente	1	0	0	0	0	0	1	0	0
15	MF	(Uruguay)	Robert Flores	2	0	0	0	0	0	2	0	0
16	MF	(Uruguay)	Pablo González	2	1	0	0	0	0	2	1	0
17	MF	(Uruguay)	Ángel Rodríguez	8	0	0	3	0	0	11	0	0
Forwards
10	FW	(Uruguay)	Michael Santos	5	0	0	1	0	0	6	0	0
21	FW	(Uruguay)	Alexander Rosso	1	0	0	0	0	0	1	0	0
23	DF	(Uruguay)	Santiago Ciganda	4	0	0	0	0	0	4	0	0
29	FW	(Uruguay)	Sebastián Ribas	1	0	0	2	0	0	3	0	0
30	FW	(Uruguay)	Nicolás Schiappacasse	2	0	0	1	0	0	3	0	0
Players transferred out during the season
8	DF	(Uruguay)	Luis Torrecilla	1	0	0	N/A	N/A	N/A	1	0	0
9	FW	(Uruguay)	Santiago García	2	0	0	N/A	N/A	N/A	2	0	0
18	MF	(Uruguay)	Martín Alaníz	3	0	0	N/A	N/A	N/A	3	0	0
24	MF	(Brazil)	Marquinhos	1	0	0	N/A	N/A	N/A	1	0	0
Total				70	2	1	18	0	0	88	2	1

== Primera División ==
=== Apertura 2015 ===
==== League table ====
Pos	Team	Pld	W	D	L	GF	GA	GD	Pts
3	Cerro	15	9	1	5	25	19	+6	28
4	Montevideo Wanderers	15	6	6	3	22	16	+6	24
5	River Plate	15	7	2	6	31	25	+6	23
6	Fénix	15	6	5	4	17	12	+5	23
7	Danubio	15	6	4	5	21	13	+8	22

==== Results by round ====
Round	1	2	3	4	5	6	7	8	9	10	11	12	13	14	15
Ground	H	A	H	A	H	A	H	A	H	A	H	A	H	A	H
Result	L	L	W	L	W	L	W	W	W	D	L	L	D	W	W
Position	8	12	10	14	10	12	8	7	4	4	7	8	9	7	5

A = Away; H = Home; W = Win; D = Draw; L = Loss

==== Matches ====
Win Draw Loss Postponed

August 16, 2015 1	River Plate	1-2	Fénix	Montevideo
15:00 UTC−3	García 70'; Ale (yellow card) 71'	Report	Maxi Pérez 30'; Cavallini 66'; Ferro (yellow card) 57'	Stadium: Parque Federico O. Saroldi; Referee: Daniel Fedorczuk

August 23, 2015 2	Nacional	2-1	River Plate	Montevideo
18:00 UTC−3	Amaral 81'; Romero 89'; De Pena (yellow card) 30'; Fucile (yellow card) 56'; Porras (yellow card) 58'; Romero (yellow card) 79'; Alonso (yellow card) 88'	Report	García 24'; A. Rodríguez (yellow card) 37'; Rosso (yellow card) 49'	Stadium: Gran Parque Central; Referee: Fernando Falce

August 29, 2015 3	River Plate	2-0	Sud América	Montevideo
15:00 UTC−3	Montelongo 49'; García 56'	Report	Perujo (yellow card) 58'	Stadium: Parque Federico O. Saroldi; Referee: Andrés Cunha

September 5, 2015 4	Wanderers	5-1	River Plate	Montevideo
15:00 UTC−3	G. Rodríguez 8' (yellow card) 46'; Santos 54'; Peinado 76' 78'; K. Ramírez 81'	Report	Torrecilla 40'; Kily González (yellow card) 26' (yellow-red card) 44'	Stadium: Parque Alfredo V. Viera; Referee: Federico Arman

September 13, 2015 5	River Plate	3-1	Racing	Montevideo
15:30 UTC−3	Santos 16'; García 37'; Montelongo 87'; D. Flores (yellow card) 62'	Report	Zabala 28' (yellow card) 38'; Barrientos (yellow card) 31'; Romero (yellow card) 64'	Stadium: Parque Federico O. Saroldi; Referee: Darío Ubriaco

September 20, 2015 6	Plaza Colonia	3-2	River Plate	Colonia del Sacramento
15:30 UTC−3	Villoldo 25' 90+5'; Dibble 69'; Malán (yellow card) 45'	Report	Montelongo 7'; Gorriarán 62'; A. Rodríguez (yellow card) 30'; Alaníz (yellow card) 64'; Silva (yellow card) 78'	Stadium: Prof. Alberto Supicci; Referee: Roberto Silvera

September 27, 2015 7	River Plate	4-0	Peñarol	Montevideo
18:30 UTC−3	Montelongo 11'; Santos 61'; Alaníz 68' (yellow card) 70'; García 75'; Kily González (yellow card) 53'	Report	Aguiar (yellow card) 84'	Stadium: Centenario; Referee: Andrés Cunha

October 4, 2015 8	Juventud	2-3	River Plate	Las Piedras
15:30 UTC−3	Mirabaje 43' (yellow card) 26'; Alonso 85'; Colman (yellow card) 2'; Soto (yellow card) 41'; Lemos (yellow card) 82'; Platero (yellow card) 90'	Report	Santos 3' 60'; Hernández 56' (o.g.); Ale (yellow card) 36'; Ciganda (yellow card) 82'; García (yellow card) 89'	Stadium: Parque Artigas; Referee: Adrián Sánchez

October 18, 2015 9	River Plate	2-1	Danubio	Montevideo
15:30 UTC−3	García 52' 90'; A. Rodríguez (yellow card) 32'; Torrecilla (yellow card) 79'; Ale (yellow card) 83'	Report	Olivera 38' (yellow card) 51'; Peña (yellow card) 15'; I. González (yellow card) 20'; Formiliano (yellow card) 45'; C. González (yellow card) 50'	Stadium: Parque Federico O. Saroldi; Referee: Christian Ferreyra

October 25, 2015 10	Cerro	1-1	River Plate	Montevideo
11:00 UTC−3	Pellejero 30' (yellow card) 60'; Klein (yellow card) 90+2'	Report	García 90+1'; Marquinhos (yellow card) 49'; Kily González (yellow card) 61'; Ciganda (yellow card) 63'; Ale (yellow card) 71'	Stadium: Luis Tróccoli; Referee: Javier Bentancor

November 1, 2015 11	River Plate	2-3	Rentistas	Montevideo
15:30 UTC−3	García 45+1'; Alaníz 49' (yellow card) 88'; Ronaldo (yellow card) 86'	Report	Cabaco 48' (yellow card) 44'; Cóccaro 65'; Mastriani 79'; Ramírez (yellow card) 53' (yellow-red card) 55'; Vázquez (yellow card) 33'	Stadium: Parque Federico O. Saroldi; Referee: Darío Ubriaco

November 6, 2015 12	El Tanque Sisley	2-1	River Plate	Florida
20:30 UTC−3	Galli 14' (yellow card) 7'; Zunino 40' (yellow card) 73'	Report	García 32'; G. González (yellow card) 34'; R. Flores (yellow card) 53'; A. Rodríguez (yellow card) 54'	Stadium: Campeones Olímpicos; Referee: Jonhatan Fuentes

November 21, 2015 13	River Plate	2-2	Liverpool	Montevideo
16:00 UTC−3	Ciganda 9'; Ronaldo 63' (yellow card) 70'; Ruiz (yellow card) 66'; C. González (yellow card) 79'	Report	Arias 31' 41'; Mallo (yellow card) 32'; De La Cruz (yellow card) 44'; Carrera (yellow card) 70'; Freitas (yellow card) 87'	Stadium: Parque Federico O. Saroldi; Referee: Pablo Giménez

November 27, 2015 14	Defensor Sporting	1-2	River Plate	Montevideo
20:30 UTC−3	F. Rodríguez 14'	Report	Santos 53'; Schiappacasse 90+1' (yellow card) 90+1'; García (yellow card) 55'; G. González (yellow card) 78'; A. Rodríguez (yellow card) 87'	Stadium: Luis Franzini; Referee: Javier Bentancor

December 5, 2015 15	River Plate	4-0	Villa Teresa	Montevideo
16:00 UTC−3	Montelongo 29'; Santos 39'; Ronaldo 56'; Schiappacasse 63'; A. Rodríguez (yellow card) 40'	Report	Beato (yellow card) 26'; Arguiñarena (yellow card) 43'; Bentancur (red card) 70'	Stadium: Parque Federico O. Saroldi; Referee: Fernando Falce

=== Clausura 2016 ===
==== League table ====
Pos	Team	Pld	W	D	L	GF	GA	GD	Pts
11	Villa Teresa	15	5	4	6	15	19	−4	19
12	Juventud	15	4	6	5	19	19	0	18
13	River Plate	15	5	3	7	15	16	−1	18
14	Racing	15	3	5	7	19	24	−5	14
15	Danubio	15	3	4	8	18	25	−7	13

==== Result by round ====
Round	1	2	3	4	5	6	7	8	9	10	11	12	13	14	15
Ground	A	H	A	H	A	H	A	H	A	H	A	H	A	H	A
Result	D	L	L	D	W	L	W	D	W	W	L	W	L	L	L
Position	9	12	14	15	11	14	12	12	8	6	8	6	8	10	13

A = Away; H = Home; W = Win; D = Draw; L = Loss

==== Matches ====
Win Draw Loss Postponed

February 6, 2016 1	Fénix	1-1	River Plate	Montevideo
17:00 UTC−3	Silva 71'; Waterman (yellow card) 20'; Rivero (yellow card) 43'; Zazpe (yellow card) 55'	Report	Rosso 38'; Ciganda (yellow card) 33'; Herrera (yellow card) 55'; Ale (yellow card) 66'; P. González (yellow card) 77'	Stadium: Parque Capurro; Referee: Pablo Giménez

February 13, 2016 2	River Plate	0-3	Nacional	Maldonado
17:00 UTC−3	P. González (red card) 19'; Montelongo (yellow card) 31'; Herrera (yellow card) 86'	Report	López 6' 9' 86'; Polenta (yellow card) 44'; Olivera (yellow card) 48'; Barbaro (yellow card) 89'	Stadium: Campus Maldonado; Referee: Andrés Cunha

February 20, 2016 3	Sud América	2-1	River Plate	San José de Mayo
20:00 UTC−3	F. Rodríguez 16'; Vega 46'; Perujo (yellow card) 44'; Malán (yellow card) 60'	Report	Schiappacasse 20'; D. Rodríguez (yellow card) 58'; Ale (red card) 80'	Stadium: Casto Martínez Laguarda; Referee: Javier Bentancor

February 27, 2016 4	River Plate	1-1	Wanderers	Montevideo
15:30 UTC−3	Ribas 52'; Ronaldo (yellow card) 26'; D. Rodríguez (yellow card) 63'; Herrera (yellow card) 88'	Report	G. Rodríguez 22'; Silva (yellow card) 53'; Cabrera (yellow card) 89'	Stadium: Parque Federico O. Saroldi; Referee: Leodán González

March 6, 2016 5	Racing	0-1	River Plate	Montevideo
16:30 UTC−3	Méndez (yellow card) 52'	Report	Santos 82'; P. González (yellow card) 49'	Stadium: Parque Osvaldo Roberto; Referee: Óscar Rojas

March 20, 2016 6	River Plate	0-1	Plaza Colonia	Montevideo
10:30 UTC−3	Santos (yellow card) 20'; R. Flores (yellow card) 38'	Report	de Ávila 40'; Caseras (yellow card) 20'	Stadium: Parque Federico O. Saroldi; Referee: Gustavo Tejera

April 3, 2016 7	Peñarol	0-2	River Plate	Montevideo
18:00 UTC−3	Forlán (yellow card) 3'; Nández (yellow card) 10'; Olivera (yellow card) 31'; Costa (yellow card) 70'; Valverde (yellow card) 86'	Report	Santos 42'; Taján 90'; Pintos (yellow card) 63'	Stadium: Centenario; Referee: Daniel Fedorczuk

April 10, 2016 8	River Plate	0-0	Juventud	Montevideo
15:30 UTC−3	Santos (yellow card) 50'; Herrera (yellow card) 87'	Report	Vargas (yellow card) 35'; Hernández (yellow card) 41'; Duffard (yellow card) 80'	Stadium: Parque Federico O. Saroldi; Referee: Óscar Rojas

April 24, 2016 9	Danubio	0-3	River Plate	Montevideo
15:30 UTC−3	Zafarino (yellow card) 42'; C. González (yellow card) 57' (yellow-red card) 58'; Olivera (yellow card) 61'; Grossmüller (yellow card) 71'	Report	A. Rodríguez 20'; Santos 63' 90+2'; C. González (yellow card) 37'; Schiappacasse (yellow card) 62'; Ronaldo (yellow card) 84'	Stadium: Jardines del Hipódromo; Referee: Jonhatan Fuentes

April 30, 2016 10	River Plate	3-1	Cerro	Montevideo
10:30 UTC−3	Santos 25'; D. Rodríguez Telechea 33' (o.g.) (yellow card) 30'; Rosso 61'; D. Flores (yellow card) 40'; D. Rodríguez (yellow card) 44'; Herrera (yellow card) 57'; Vicente (yellow card) 71'	Report	Porta 80'; D. Rodríguez Telechea (yellow card) 30'	Stadium: Parque Federico O. Saroldi; Referee: Daniel Rodríguez

May 8, 2016 11	Rentistas	2-1	River Plate	Montevideo
15:00 UTC−3	Burgueño 6' 40'; Núñez (yellow card) 3'; Terans (yellow card) 9'; Vázquez (yellow card) 26'; Martínez (red card) 87'	Report	Ronaldo 87'	Stadium: Complejo Rentistas; Referee: Leodán González

May 14, 2016 12	River Plate	1-0	El Tanque Sisley	Montevideo
15:00 UTC−3	Rosso 81'; D. Flores (yellow card) 34'; Ronaldo (yellow card) 54'; Santos (yellow card) 84'	Report	Fagúndez (yellow card) 45'; M. González (yellow card) 84'	Stadium: Parque Federico O. Saroldi; Referee: Óscar Rojas

May 22, 2016 13	Liverpool	1-0	River Plate	Montevideo
15:00 UTC−3	Arias 78'; Aprile (yellow card) 22' (yellow-red card) 56'; Díaz (yellow card) 27'; Sandoval (yellow card) 46' de la Cruz (yellow card) 64'	Report	Ronaldo (yellow card) 16'; G. González (yellow card) 26'; Ribas (yellow card) 66'; Montelongo (yellow card) 87'; D. Rodríguez (yellow card) 90'	Stadium: Belvedere; Referee: Esteban Ostojich

May 29, 2016 14	River Plate	1-2	Defensor Sporting	Montevideo
15:00 UTC−3	Bonilla 35' (o.g.); D. Flores (yellow card) 42'; A. Rodríguez (yellow card) 78'; Santos (yellow card) 87'	Report	Zunino 54'; Gómez 80'; Amado (yellow card) 10'; Bonilla (yellow card) 22'; N. Olivera (yellow card) 23' de los Santos (yellow card) 26'; Rabuñal (yellow card) 64'	Stadium: Parque Federico O. Saroldi; Referee: Walter Juncal

June 5, 2016 15	Villa Teresa	2-0	River Plate	Montevideo
15:00 UTC−3	de León 28' (yellow card) 82'; Arguiñarena 51'	Report		Stadium: José Nasazzi; Referee: Adrián Pereira

=== Overall table 2015–2016 ===
Pos	Team	Pld	W	D	L	GF	GA	GD	Pts
7	Sud América	30	11	10	9	34	38	−4	43
8	Defensor Sporting	30	12	6	12	48	54	−6	42
9	River Plate	30	12	5	13	46	41	+5	41
10	Liverpool	30	12	4	14	31	42	−11	40
11	Rentistas	30	11	6	13	36	36	0	39

== Copa Libertadores ==
=== Pre-eliminary round ===
Win Draw Loss Postponed

February 2, 2016 1	River Plate	2-0	Universidad de Chile	Maldonado
21:45 UTC−3	Santos 62'; Herrera 71' (o.g.); A. Rodríguez (yellow card) 23'	Report	Lorenzetti (yellow card) 13'; Martínez (yellow card) 31'; Monzón (yellow card) 60'; Canales (yellow card) 69'	Stadium: Campus Maldonado; Referee: (Argentina) Patricio Loustau

February 9, 2016 2	Universidad de Chile	0-0	River Plate	Santiago
19:30 UTC−3	Martínez (yellow card) 24'; Valencia (yellow card) 79'; Ortiz (yellow card) 90+3'	Report	Kily González; (yellow card) 55'; Ronaldo (yellow card) 71'; D. Flores (yellow card) 80'	Stadium: Nacional de Chile; Referee: (Ecuador) Carlos Vera

=== Round 1 ===
==== Group table ====
Pos	Team	Pld	W	D	L	GF	GA	GD	Pts	Qualification
1	(Argentina) Rosario Central	6	3	2	1	13	8	+5	11	Final stages
2	(Uruguay) Nacional	6	2	3	1	6	6	0	9	Final stages
3	(Brazil) Palmeiras	6	2	2	2	12	8	+4	8	
4	(Uruguay) River Plate	6	0	3	3	6	15	−9	3	

Source: CONMEBOL
Rules for classification: 1) points; 2) goal difference; 3) goals scored; 4) away goals scored; 5) drawing of lots.

==== Matches ====
Win Draw Loss Postponed

February 16, 2016 1	River Plate	2-2	(Brazil) Palmeiras	Maldonado
20:45 UTC−3	Santos 50'; Montelongo 64'; A. Rodríguez (yellow card) 24'; Kily González (yellow card) 90'	Report	Jean 34'; G. Jesus 58'; Lucas (yellow card) 28'; Prass (yellow card) 49'; Carvalho (yellow card) 66'; Zé Roberto (yellow card) 79'	Stadium: Campus Maldonado; Referee: (Chile) Julio Bascuñán

March 2, 2016 2	Nacional	0-0	River Plate	Montevideo
19:30 UTC−3	Fucile (yellow card) 33'; K. Ramírez (yellow card) 88'	Report	Ribas (yellow card) 36'; Ronaldo (yellow card) 48'; A. Rodríguez (yellow card) 69'	Stadium: Gran Parque Central; Referee: (Peru) Víctor Carrillo

March 9, 2016 3	(Argentina) Rosario Central	4-1	River Plate	Rosario
19:30 UTC−3	Ruben 18' 61' 71'; G. Herrera 56'	Report	Santos 64'; Kily González (yellow card) 29'; Ronaldo (yellow card) 82'	Stadium: Gigante de Arroyito; Referee: (Paraguay) Ulises Mereles

March 17, 2016 4	River Plate	1-3	(Argentina) Rosario Central	Montevideo
19:30 UTC−3	Santos 11'	Report	Donatti 13'; Aguirre 51' (yellow card) 51'; Cervi 90'; Battaglia (yellow card) 32'; Pinola (yellow card) 85'	Stadium: Centenario; Referee: (Venezuela) José Argote

April 7, 2016 5	River Plate	2-2	Nacional	Montevideo
19:30 UTC−3	Taján 5'; I. González 80' (o.g.); Herrera (yellow card) 6'; Santos (yellow card) 36'; G. González (yellow card) 84'	Report	Victorino 7'; K. Ramírez 72'; Romero (yellow card) 55'; Fucile (yellow card) 87'; I. González (yellow card) 87'; Barcia (yellow card) 88'	Stadium: Centenario; Referee: (Paraguay) Enrique Cáceres

April 14, 2016 6	(Brazil) Palmeiras	4-0	River Plate	São Paulo
21:45 UTC−3	Egídio 18'; Allione 45' 72'; Alecsandro 80' (yellow card) 10'	Report	Schiappacasse (yellow card) 24'; Pintos (yellow card) 29'; D. Flores (yellow card) 79'; Ribas (yellow card) 90'	Stadium: Allianz Parque; Referee: (Bolivia) Oscar Maldonado
