= 2016–17 River Plate Montevideo season =

River Plate
2016 season
- President: (Uruguay) Renzo Gatto
- Head coach: (Uruguay) Juan Ramón Carrasco (until September 26, 2016) (Uruguay) Pablo Tiscornia (since September 27, 2016)
- Stadium: Estadio Saroldi
- Uruguayan Primera División: 10th
- Top goalscorer: League: (Uruguay) Mathías Saavedra, 6 goals All: (Uruguay) Mathías Saavedra, 6 goals
Home colours	Away colours

River Plate took part in the Uruguayan Primera División (so called "Uruguayo Especial"), reaching 10th position. Mathías Saavedra was the topscorer with 6 goals.

== Transfer Window ==
=== Winter 2016 ===
==== In ====
Position	Nationality	Name	Age	From	Fee	Transfer Window	Ref.
FW	(Uruguay)	Richard Porta	32	Cerro	Transfer	Winter	ovaciondigital.com.uy
FW	(Uruguay)	Mathías Saavedra	27	Sud América	Transfer	Winter	tenfield.com.uy
DF	(Brazil)	Ricardo Lima	22	(Brazil) Metropolitano	Transfer	Winter	tenfield.com.uy
FW	(Brazil)	Thiago	30	Free agent	Transfer	Winter	tenfield.com.uy
FW	(Uruguay)	Horacio Sequeira	21	Cerro Largo	Transfer	Winter	tenfield.com.uy
MF	(Uruguay)	Fabricio Fernández	23	(Belgium) Dender	Transfer	Winter	tenfield.com.uy
FW	(Uruguay)	Mauro Da Luz	21	Reserves	-	Winter	tenfield.com.uy

==== Out ====
Position	Nationality	Name	Age	To	Fee	Transfer Window	Ref.
FW	(Uruguay)	Michael Santos	23	(Spain) Málaga	Transfer	Winter	marca.com
FW	(Uruguay)	Nicolás Schiappacasse	18	(Spain) Atlético Madrid	Transfer	Winter	tenfield.com.uy
DF	(Brazil)	Ronaldo Conceição	29	(Brazil) Atlético Mineiro	Transfer	Winter	globoesporte.com
DF	(Uruguay)	Darío Flores	32	(Guatemala) Municipal	Transfer	Winter	tenfield.com.uy
MF	(Uruguay)	Ángel Rodríguez	23	Peñarol	Transfer	Winter	tenfield.com.uy
DF	(Uruguay)	Lucas Olaza	21	Danubio	Transfer	Winter	canteiraceleste.com
DF	(Uruguay)	Cristian González	39	Plaza Colonia	Transfer	Winter	tenfield.com.uy
MF	(Uruguay)	Pablo González	21	Villa Española	Transfer	Winter	tenfield.com.uy
FW	(Uruguay)	Jonathan Ramírez	25	Cerro	Transfer	Winter	tenfield.com.uy
MF	(Uruguay)	Mario Leguizamón	34	-	Free agent	Winter	tenfield.com.uy
FW	(Uruguay)	Sebastián Ribas	28	(Mexico) Venados	Transfer	Winter	yucatan.com.mx

== Squad ==
=== First team squad ===
As of 26 September 2016

Note: Flags indicate national team as defined under FIFA eligibility rules; some limited exceptions apply. Players may hold more than one non-FIFA nationality.

No.	Pos.	Nation	Player
1	GK	URU	Nicola Pérez
2	DF	URU	Agustín Ale
3	DF	URU	Lucas Ruiz
5	MF	URU	Federico Pintos
6	DF	BRA	Ricardo Lima
7	MF	URU	Bruno Montelongo
8	MF	URU	Fernando Gorriarán
9	FW	URU	Richard Porta
10	MF	URU	Diego Vicente
12	GK	URU	Juan Tinaglini
13	MF	URU	Diego Vicente
13	MF	URU	Matías Jones
14	DF	URU	Iván Silva
15	FW	URU	Horacio Sequeira

No.	Pos.	Nation	Player
16	FW	COL	César Taján
17	FW	URU	Mauro Da Luz
18	DF	URU	Fabricio Fernández
19	DF	URU	Diego Rodríguez
20	DF	URU	Giovanni González
21	FW	URU	Alexander Rosso
22	DF	URU	Claudio Herrera
23	FW	URU	Mathías Saavedra
25	GK	URU	Gastón Olveira
26	DF	URU	Esteban Mascareña
27	MF	URU	Facundo Vigo
28	FW	BRA	Thiago Da Silva
29	MF	URU	Álvaro Fernández
31	FW	URU	Nicolás Machado

=== Out on loan ===
Note: Flags indicate national team as defined under FIFA eligibility rules; some limited exceptions apply. Players may hold more than one non-FIFA nationality.

No.	Pos.	Nation	Player
—	GK	URU	Danilo Suárez (at (Uruguay) Miramar Misiones)
—	DF	BRA	Gabriel Marques (at (Ecuador) Barcelona Guayaquil)
—	MF	URU	Cristhian Maciel (at (Uruguay) Tacuarembó)
—	MF	URU	Christian Pérez (at (Uruguay) Progreso)

No.	Pos.	Nation	Player
—	MF	URU	Christian Serrón (at (Uruguay) Rampla Juniors)
—	FW	URU	Martín Alaníz (at (Spain) Real Oviedo)
—	FW	URU	Diego Casas (at (Uruguay) Villa Española)

=== Top scorers ===
Last update on December 11, 2016

Rank	Pos.	No.	Name	Primera División
1	FW	23	(Uruguay) Mathías Saavedra	6
2	FW	9	(Uruguay) Richard Porta	3
2	FW	21	(Uruguay) Alexander Rosso	3
2	MF	30	(Uruguay) Matías Jones	3
3	DF	2	(Uruguay) Agustín Ale	1
3	DF	6	(Brazil) Ricardo Lima	1
-	Own goals	-	-	1
Total				18

=== Disciplinary record ===
Last updated on December 15, 2016

No.	Pos	Nat	Name	Primera División		
No.	Pos	Nat	Name	Booked	(yellow card) (yellow-red card)	Sent off (straight red)
Goalkeepers
1	GK	(Uruguay)	Nicola Pérez	1	0	0
25	GK	(Uruguay)	Gastón Olveira	1	0	0
Defenders
2	DF	(Uruguay)	Agustín Ale	5	1	0
6	DF	(Brazil)	Ricardo Lima	3	0	0
14	MF	(Uruguay)	Iván Silva	0	0	1
19	DF	(Uruguay)	Diego Rodríguez	2	0	0
20	DF	(Uruguay)	Giovanni González	2	0	0
22	DF	(Uruguay)	Claudio Herrera	3	0	0
26	DF	(Uruguay)	Esteban Mascareña	1	0	0
Midfielders
5	MF	(Uruguay)	Federico Pintos	3	0	0
7	MF	(Uruguay)	Bruno Montelongo	2	0	0
8	MF	(Uruguay)	Fernando Gorriarán	3	0	0
30	MF	(Uruguay)	Matías Jones	1	0	0
Forwards
9	FW	(Uruguay)	Richard Porta	2	0	0
16	FW	(Colombia)	César Taján	1	0	0
17	FW	(Uruguay)	Mauro Da Luz	1	0	1
21	FW	(Uruguay)	Alexander Rosso	1	0	0
23	FW	(Uruguay)	Mathías Saavedra	3	0	0
Players transferred out during the season
Total				35	1	2

== Primera División ==
=== League table ===
Pos	Team	Pld	W	D	L	GF	GA	GD	Pts
8	Racing	15	5	5	5	24	26	−2	20
9	Fénix	15	5	4	6	19	19	0	19
10	River Plate	15	5	3	7	18	28	−10	18
11	Juventud	15	4	5	6	9	11	−2	17
12	Sud América	15	5	2	8	17	20	−3	17

Updated to match(es) played on December 11, 2016. Source: AUF
Rules for classification: 1) points; 2) goal difference; 3) number of goals scored.

=== Results by round ===
Round	1	2	3	4	5	6	7	8	9	10	11	12	13	14	15
Ground	A	H	A	H	H	H	A	H	A	A	A	A	H	H	A
Result	D	L	D	L	L	L	D	W	L	L	W	L	W	W	W
Position	4	13	14	15	15	15	15	15	15	15	14	15	14	13	10

A = Away; H = Home; W = Win; D = Draw; L = Loss

=== Matches ===
Win Draw Loss Postponed

August 31, 2016 1	Wanderers	1-1	River Plate	Montevideo
20:00 UTC−3	Rivero 61'; Castro (yellow card) 5'; Rivas (yellow card) 21'; Santos (yellow card) 82'	Report	Porta 76'; Lima (yellow card) 27'; Rodríguez (yellow card) 74'	Stadium: Estadio Centenario; Referee: Leodán González

September 4, 2016 2	River Plate	1-5	Boston River	Montevideo
15:30 UTC−3	Scotti 22' (o.g.); González (yellow card) 30'; Gorriarán (yellow card) 70'; Ale (yellow card) 14' (yellow-red card) 52'	Report	Gurri 20' (yellow card) 35'; F. Rodríguez 23' 31' 76' 79'; M.González (yellow card) 42'; A. Barán (yellow card) 50'; Cepellini (yellow card) 70'; Larrea (yellow card) 81'	Stadium: Parque Federico O. Saroldi; Referee: Claudia Umpiérrez

September 11, 2016 3	Juventud	0-0	River Plate	Las Piedras
15:30 UTC−3	Soto (yellow card) 83'; Carro (yellow card) 90+1'	Report	Lima (yellow card) 60'; Rodríguez (yellow card) 67'	Stadium: Parque Artigas; Referee: Walter Juncal

September 18, 2016 4	River Plate	0-5	Defensor Sporting	Montevideo
15:30 UTC−3		Report	Olivera 31'; Castro 37'; Bueno 48'; Cabrera 67' (yellow card) 55'; Zunino 69'; Suárez (yellow card) 84'; Zeballos (yellow card) 87'	Stadium: Parque Federico O. Saroldi; Referee: Esteban Ostojich

September 25, 2016 5	River Plate	0-3	Sud América	Montevideo
15:30 UTC−3	Gorriarán (yellow card) 24'; Porta (yellow card) 72'; Herrera (yellow card) 79'	Report	Gallego 11' (yellow card) 33'; Colman 63'; Vega 70'; Carrera (yellow card) 88'	Stadium: Parque Federico O. Saroldi; Referee: Jonhatan Fuentes

October 1, 2016 6	River Plate	1-2	Fénix	Montevideo
16:00 UTC−3	Jones 6'; Da Luz (yellow card) 80'; Rosso (yellow card) 82'	Report	Reymundez 73'; Cantera 85'; Ferro (yellow card) 6'; Pallas (yellow card) 77'	Stadium: Parque Federico O. Saroldi; Referee: Yimmi Álvarez

October 8, 2016 7	Liverpool	2-2	River Plate	Montevideo
16:00 UTC−3	De La Cruz 12' (yellow card) 90+4'; Royón 85'; Freitas (yellow card) 80'	Report	Porta 23'; Jones 49'; Ale (yellow card) 14'; F. Pintos (yellow card) 41'; Silva (red card) 77'; Herrera (yellow card) 83'	Stadium: Estadio Belvedere; Referee: Andrés Cunha

October 16, 2016 8	River Plate	2-1	Plaza Colonia	Montevideo
16:00 UTC−3	Ale 13'; Rosso 87'; Pintos (yellow card) 36'	Report	A. Fernández 22'; Redin (yellow card) 30'; Brunelli (yellow card) 72'; B. Silva (yellow card) 84'; Leyes (yellow card) 66' (yellow-red card) 85'; Torres (red card) 71'	Stadium: Parque Federico O. Saroldi; Referee: Jonhatan Fuentes

October 23, 2016 9	Danubio	2-1	River Plate	Montevideo
16:00 UTC−3	Dos Santos 51' (yellow card) 51'; Olivera 57' (yellow card) 45'; R. Fernández (yellow card) 37'; Graví (yellow card) 39'	Report	Rosso 19'; Pintos (yellow card) 55'; Herrera (yellow card) 56'; Ale (yellow card) 60'; Saavedra (yellow card) 86'; Gorriarán (yellow card) 90'	Stadium: Jardínes del Hipódromo; Referee: Fernando Falce

October 30, 2016 10	Nacional	3-1	River Plate	Montevideo
19:15 UTC−3	Ramírez 11'; S. Fernández 23'; Ligüera 70'; Carballo (yellow card) 86'	Report	Saavedra 73'; Gorriarán (red card) 8'; Ale (yellow card) 33'	Stadium: Gran Parque Central; Referee: Oscar Rojas

November 13, 2016 11	Rampla Juniors	0-2	River Plate	Montevideo
16:00 UTC−3	García (yellow card) 32'	Report	Saavedra 45' (yellow card) 32'; Porta 86'; Montelongo (yellow card) 62'; Joes (yellow card) 67'	Stadium: Olímpico; Referee: Leodán González

November 19, 2016 12	Racing	2-1	River Plate	Montevideo
16:00 UTC−3	G. Fernández 46'; Méndez 47'; Pereira (yellow card) 74'; Romero (yellow card) 89'	Report	Saavedra 11'; Porta (yellow card) 58'; Montelongo (yellow card) 58'; Ale (yellow card) 81'; Taján (yellow card) 84'	Stadium: Parque Osvaldo Roberto; Referee: Yimmi Alvarez

November 26, 2016 13	River Plate	2-1	Villa Española	Montevideo
16:30 UTC−3	Saavedra 39' 59'; Olveira (yellow card) 25'; Ale (yellow card) 86'	Report	Silva 17'; Malán (yellow card) 25'; Renato César (yellow card) 52'; Callero (yellow card) 90+1'	Stadium: Parque Federico O. Saroldi; Referee: Héctor Martínez

December 3, 2016 14	River Plate	3-1	Peñarol	Montevideo
16:30 UTC−3	Lima 8'; Saavedra 47' (yellow card) 58'; Rosso 69'; González (yellow card) 42'; Mascareña (yellow card) 56'; Da Luz (yellow card) 89'	Report	H. Novick 83'; Frascarelli (yellow card) 12'; Freitas (yellow card) 56'; Perg (yellow card) 58'; M. Rodríguez (yellow card) 71'; Nández (yellow card) 87'; A. Silva (red card) 52'	Stadium: Parque Federico O. Saroldi; Referee: Javier Bentancor

December 10, 2016 15	Cerro	0-1	River Plate	Montevideo
17:00 UTC−3	Luna (yellow card) 35'; Pizzorno (yellow card) 37'; Barboza (yellow card) 60'; Franco (yellow card) 77'	Report	Jones 38'; Pérez (yellow card) 60'; Lima (yellow card) 77'	Stadium: Luis Tróccoli; Referee: Gustavo Tejera
