= Matías Rodríguez =

Matías Rodríguez may refer to:

- Matías Rodríguez (footballer, born 1986)
- Matías Rodríguez (footballer, born 1987)
- Matías Rodríguez (footballer, born 1993)
- Matías Rodríguez, governor of the Mexican state of Hidalgo from 1925-1929.

Close matches may include:

- Matías Rodríguez Inciarte, Spanish politician, born 1948.
- Mathías Rodríguez, Uruguayan footballer, born 1997.
