= Club Atlético River Plate (Montevideo) statistics =

These are the statistics of Uruguayan side River Plate collected among Primera División Uruguaya seasons, Copa Conmebol, Copa Sudamericana and Copa Libertadores.

== Performance in Primera División ==
=== Matches in Primera División ===
Last update on Oct 8, 2022

Total: 1782 games played – 607 Wins – 506 Draws – 669 Losses – 2351 Goals for – 2545 Goals against
Team	GP	W	D	L	GF	GA	BR	WR
Albion	2	2	0	0	6	1	4–1 (win) (Apertura 2022)	4-1 (win) (Apertura 2022)
Atenas	6	4	1	1	12	8	3–1 (win) (Apertura 2014–15), (Apertura 2018)	2–5 (loss) (Clausura 2014–15)
Basáñez	4	1	2	1	3	3	2–1 (win) (Clausura 1995)	0–1 (loss) (Apertura 1994)
Bella Vista	92	40	21	31	132	116	5–0 (win) (Second leg 1940)	2–5 (loss) (First leg 1981)
Boston River	13	4	4	5	18	25	3-1 (win) (Clausura 2021)	1–5 (loss) (Uruguayo Especial 2016)
Central Español	88	34	23	31	140	121	5–0 (win) (Clausura 2012–13)	1–4 (loss) (Second leg 1940)
Cerrito	13	5	5	3	18	13	1–5 (win) (Clausura 2022)	0–3 (loss) (Apertura 2006–07)
Cerro	114	41	34	39	145	152	5–0 (win) (Second leg 1953)	0–5 (loss) (Second leg 1955)
Cerro Largo	17	10	3	4	37	25	0–5 (win) (Clausura 2022)	0–4 (loss) (Clausura 2021)
Danubio	109	34	35	40	142	158	6–2 (win) (Apertura 1995)	0–6 (loss) (First leg 1955)
Defensor Sporting	145	39	49	57	187	215	6–1 (win) (Second Leg 1937)	0–5 (loss) (Uruguayo Especial 2016)
Deportivo Colonia	5	3	2	0	9	4	2–0 (win) (Apertura 2003, Clausura 2005–06)	1-1 (Uruguayo Especial 2005, Apertura 2005-06)
Deportivo Maldonado	15	4	3	8	15	22	4–2 (win) (Clausura 2000)	0–4 (loss) (Classificatorio 2002)
El Tanque Sisley	14	6	3	5	19	13	4–0 (win) (Clausura 2011–12, Clausura 2014–15)	1–2 (loss) (Apertura 2010–11, Clausura 2010–11, Apertura 2015–16)
Fénix	48	20	14	14	65	60	5–1 (win) (Uruguayo Especial 2005)	1–5 (loss) (Classificatorio 2002)
Frontera Rivera	4	3	0	1	9	5	1-4 (win) (Apertura 2000)	2–3 (loss) (Clausura 1999)
Huracán Buceo	52	16	22	14	64	54	4–0 (win) (First leg 1984)	1–3 (loss) (First leg 1972)
Juventud	25	16	4	5	43	22	5–1 (win) (Classificatorio 2002)	4-1 (loss) (Apertura 2019)
Liverpool	117	38	32	47	163	165	5–0 (win) (Apertura 2018)	1–5 (loss) (First leg 1971)
Miramar Misiones	35	19	7	9	56	44	5–0 (win) (Second leg 1945)	2–5 (loss) (First leg 1987)
Nacional	148	26	23	99	159	372	1–4 (win) (Clausura 2009–10)	0–10 (loss) (Second leg 1938)
Paysandú Bella Vista	8	4	3	1	13	9	3–1 (win) (Apertura 1999)	3–1 (loss) (Classificatorio 2002)
Paysandú	2	1	0	1	6	6	3–2 (win) (Apertura 2005–06)	3–4 (loss) (Uruguayo Especial 2005)
Peñarol	148	32	33	83	161	292	4–0 (win) (Apertura 2015–16)	0–7 (loss) (First leg 1993, Second leg 1938)
Plaza Colonia	18	8	4	6	23	17	3–0 (win) (Uruguayo Especial 2005)	2–3 (loss) (Apertura 2015–16)
Progreso	46	13	14	19	73	63	6–0 (win) (Apertura 2007–08)	4-0 (loss) (Apertura 2019)
Racing	78	28	28	22	41	34	4–0 (win) (Third leg 1932, First leg 1968)	1–4 (loss) (Clausura 2010–11)
Rampla Juniors	103	33	34	36	142	150	7–0 (win) (Clausura 2007–08)	1–8 (loss) (First leg 1951)
Rentistas	50	19	20	11	67	44	0-5 (win) (Clausura 2022)	0–2 (loss) (First leg 1977, Apertura 2014–15)
Rocha	10	4	2	4	12	12	3–0 (win) (Clausura 2006–07)	0–3 (loss) (Apertura 2006–07)
Sud América	76	35	16	25	115	99	5–1 (win) (Clausura 2021)	1–4 (loss) (First leg 1942)
Tacuarembó	25	10	10	5	41	30	5–0 (win) (Clausura 2007–08)	0–3 (loss) (Apertura 2003)
Torque	7	0	5	2	7	11	3-3 (Apertura 2021)	3-0 (loss) (Clausura 2018)
Villa Española	10	6	2	2	19	13	4–2 (win) (Clausura 1998, Clausura 2021)	0–3 (loss) (Apertura 2003)
Villa Teresa	2	1	0	1	4	2	4–0 (win) (Apertura 2015–16)	0-2 (loss) (Clausura 2015-16)
Wanderers	130	47	47	36	188	167	5–1 (win) (First leg 1938, Apertura 2007–08, Clausura 2008–09)	0-5 (loss) (Clausura 2018)

=== Matches in Torneo Intermedio ===
Last update on Ago 2, 2022

Total: 35 games played – 12 Wins – 14 Draws – 9 Losses – 40 Goals for – 39 Goals against
Team	GP	W	D	L	GF	GA	BR	WR
Atenas	1	0	1	0	1	1	1-1 (2018)	1-1 (2018)
Boston River	4	2	1	1	4	1	0-3 (win) (2020)	0-1 (loss) (2022)
Cerrito	1	1	0	0	3	0	3-0 (win) (2022)	3-0 (win) (2022)
Cerro	1	0	1	0	1	1	1-1 (2017)	1-1 (2017)
Cerro Largo	1	0	1	0	0	0	0-0 (2022)	0-0 (2022)
Danubio	4	3	0	1	8	3	4-0 (win) (2020)	0-2 (loss) (2017)
Defensor Sporting	4	2	2	0	5	3	2-1 (win) (2019)	1-1 (2020, 2022)
Fénix	1	1	0	0	3	2	3-2 (win) (2020)	3-2 (win) (2020)
Deportivo Maldonado	1	0	0	1	1	2	2-1 (loss) (2020)	2-1 (loss) (2020)
Juventud	2	1	1	0	2	2	1-2 (win) (2019)	1-0 (loss) (2017)
Liverpool	1	0	1	0	2	2	2-2 (2019)	2-2 (2019)
Nacional	4	0	1	3	2	8	1-1 (2019)	3-0 (loss) (2022)
Peñarol	3	2	0	1	3	7	1-2 (win) (2019)	6-0 (loss) (2018)
Plaza Colonia	1	0	1	0	0	0	0-0 (2022)	0-0 (2022)
Progreso	2	0	2	0	1	1	1-1 (2018)	0-0 (2019)
Racing	1	0	1	0	1	1	1-1 (2017)	1-1 (2017)
Sud América	1	0	0	1	0	2	0-2 (loss) (2017)	0-2 (loss) (2017)
Torque	1	0	1	0	2	2	2-2 (2018)	2-2 (2018)
Wanderers	1	0	1	0	2	2	2-2 (2017)	2-2 (2017)

== Performance in CONMEBOL competitions ==
=== Copa Libertadores ===
- 1 appearance (2016)
- Best: group stage (2016)

==== Matches in Copa Libertadores ====
Total: 8 games played – 1 Wins – 4 Draws – 3 Losses – 8 Goals for – 15 Goals against
Team	GP	W	D	L	GF	GA	BR	WR
Universidad de Chile	2	1	1	0	2	0	2–0 (win) (2 February 2016 – Estadio Campus Municipal de Maldonado, Maldonado)	0–0 (9 February 2016 – Estadio Nacional de Chile, Santiago)
(Brazil) Palmeiras	2	0	1	1	2	6	2–2 (16 February 2016 – Estadio Campus Municipal de Maldonado, Maldonado)	4–0 (loss) (14 April 2016 – Allianz Parque, São Paulo)
(Argentina) Rosario Central	2	0	0	2	2	7	N/A	4-1 (loss) (9 March 2016 – Gigante de Arroyito, Rosario)
(Uruguay) Nacional	2	0	2	0	2	2	2-2 (7 April 2016 – Estadio Centenario, Montevideo)	0-0 (2 March 2016 – Gran Parque Central, Montevideo)

=== Copa Sudamericana ===
- 8 appearances (2008, 2009, 2010, 2013, 2014, 2019, 2020 and 2022)
- Best: semifinals (2009)

==== Matches in Copa Sudamericana ====
Total: 38 games played – 19 Wins – 7 Draws – 12 Losses – 48 Goals for – 41 Goals against
Team	GP	W	D	L	GF	GA	BR	WR
(Chile) Universidad Católica	6	4	0	2	9	6	3–0 (win) (27 August 2014 – Estadio Luis Franzini, Montevideo)	0–4 (loss) (7 August 2008 – Estadio San Carlos de Apoquindo, Santiago)
(Bolivia) Blooming	4	4	0	0	8	1	4–0 (win) (6 August 2013 – Estadio Luis Franzini, Montevideo)	2–1 (win) (27 August 2009 – Estadio Centenario, Montevideo)
(Brazil) Vitória	2	1	1	0	5	2	4–1 (win) (22 September 2009 – Estadio Centenario, Montevideo)	1–1 (30 September 2009 – Estadio Manoel Barradas, Salvador)
(Argentina) San Lorenzo	2	1	0	1	1	1	0-1 (win) (4 November 2009 – Estadio Pedro Bidegain, Buenos Aires)	0–1 (loss) (21 October 2009 – Estadio Centenario, Montevideo)
(Ecuador) LDU Quito	2	1	0	1	2	8	2–1 (win) (12 November 2009 – Estadio Centenario, Montevideo)	7-0 (loss) (19 November 2009 – Estadio Casa Blanca, Quito)
(Paraguay) Guaraní	2	1	0	1	4	4	4–2 (win) (1 September 2010 – Estadio Centenario, Montevideo)	2-0 (loss) (19 August 2010 – Estadio Defensores del Chaco, Asunción)
(Colombia) Águilas Doradas	2	0	1	1	0	1	0–0 (28 August 2013 – Estadio Luis Franzini, Montevideo)	1-0 (loss) (21 August 2013 – Estadio Metropolitano Ciudad de Itagüí, Itagüí)
(Ecuador) Emelec	2	0	1	1	2	3	1–1 (25 September 2014 – Estadio Luis Franzini, Montevideo)	2-1 (loss) (18 September 2014 – Estadio George Capwell, Guayaquil)
(Brazil) Santos	2	0	2	0	1	1	1–1 (26 February 2019 – Estádio do Pacaembu, São Paulo)	0–0 (12 February 2019 – Estadio Luis Franzini, Montevideo)
(Argentina) Colón	2	0	1	1	1	3	0–0 (21 May 2019 – Estádio Centenario, Montevideo)	3–1 (loss) (28 May 2019 – Estadio Brigadier General Estanislao López, Santa Fe)
(Peru) Atlético Grau	2	2	0	0	3	1	1–2 (win) (11 Feb 2020 – Estadio Nacional, Lima)	1–0 (win) (25 Feb 2020 – Parque Alfredo V. Viera, Montevideo)
(Colombia) Atlético Nacional	2	1	1	0	4	2	3–1 (win) (4 Nov 2020 – Parque Alfredo V. Viera, Montevideo)	1–1 (28 Oct 2020 – Estadio Atanasio Girardot, Medellín)
(Uruguay) Liverpool	2	2	0	0	3	0	2–0 (win) (17 Mar 2022 – Estadio Centenario, Montevideo)	0–1 (win) (9 Mar 2022 – Estadio Centenario, Montevideo)
(Argentina) Racing	2	1	0	1	1	1	0–1 (win) (26 May 2022 – Estadio Presidente Juan Domingo Perón, Avellaneda)	0–1 (loss) (7 Apr 2022 – Estadio Centenario, Montevideo)
(Peru) Melgar	2	0	0	2	1	4	1–2 (loss) (3 May 2022 – Estadio Centenario, Montevideo)	2–0 (loss) (13 Apr 2022 – Estadio de la UNSA, Arequipa)
(Brazil) Cuiabá	2	1	0	1	3	3	1–2 (win) (27 Apr 2022 – Arena Pantanal, Cuiabá)	1–2 (loss) (18 May 2022 – Estadio Centenario, Montevideo)

=== Copa CONMEBOL ===
- 2 appearances (1996 and 1998)
- Best: quarterfinals (1996)

==== Matches in Copa Conmebol ====
Total: 6 games played – 1 Wins – 3 Draws – 2 Losses – 9 Goals for – 10 Goals against
Team	GP	W	D	L	GF	GA	BR	WR
(Uruguay) Porongos	2	1	1	0	8	2	6–0 (win) (2 October 1996 – Parque Federico Omar Saroldi, Montevideo)	2–2 (10 September 1996 – Estadio Casto Martínez Laguarda, San José de Mayo)
(Argentina) Rosario Central	2	0	1	1	0	4	0–0 (26 October 1996 – Parque Federico Omar Saroldi, Montevideo)	4–0 (loss) (8 October 1996 – Gigante de Arroyito, Rosario, Argentina)
(Uruguay) Huracán Buceo	2	0	1	1	1	4	0–0 (18 July 1998 – Parque Huracán, Montevideo)	1-4 (loss) (26 July 1998 – Parque Federico Omar Saroldi, Montevideo)
