= Christian Perez =

Christian Perez may refer to:

- Christian Perez (footballer, born 1963), French football forward
- Christian Pérez (footballer, born 1990), Mexican football centre-back
- Christian Pérez (Uruguayan footballer) (born 1990), Uruguayan football midfielder
- Christian Perez (darts player) (born 1982), Filipino darts player
- Christian Jaymar Perez (born 1993), Filipino basketball player
