= Stade Bordelais (football) =

French football club

- Full name: Stade Bordelais ASPTT Football
- Founded: 18 July 1889
- Ground: Stade Sainte Germaine
- Capacity: 3000
- Chairman: Alan Fournier; Rudy Dambon; Cihat Ulas
- Manager: Alexandre Torres
- League: Régional 1
- 2024–25: National 3 Group A, 14th of 14 (relegated)
- Website: http://www.stade-bordelais-football.com/

Stade Bordelais ASPTT Football, known simply as Stade Bordelais, is the association football section of the French multi-sport club based in Bordeaux. The football section was created in 1889. They play at the Stade Sainte Germain, which has a capacity of 3,000 seated. They currently play in the Régional 1. The club's colours are black and white.

== History ==
Formed in 1889 as the football section of Stade Bordelais Omnisport Club, the club has also been known since 1901 as Stade Bordelais Université Club, after a short lived merger of the omnisports club with Clubs Université Bordelais. Under this name they won the first edition of the Division d'Honneur of the Aquitaine League in 1920, the first of four such titles for the club in the 1920s.

The first appearance of the club in national competition was the first edition of the Division Nationale de CFA in 1948, which they qualified for via a third-place finish in the Aquitaine Division d'Honneur. A 9th-place finish in the West Group was not sufficient to qualify automatically for the competition the following year. However, in 1950 the club were champions of the Aquitaine Division d'Honneur, automatically qualifying for the Division Nationale de CFA. This time they maintained their presence at this level for two seasons.

For more than 45 years the club played just regional football, before again winning the Aquitaine Division d'Honneur in 1997. This qualified the club for the first season under the new name of Championnat de France Amateur 2, the fifth level of the national league structure. The club finished third in group E, which was sufficient to gain promotion, due to the two better places clubs being ineligible reserve sides. The first season at the fourth level saw the club obtain a mid-table finish, but they were relegated back to the fifth level in 2000 and eventually back to the regional league in 2003.

The club bounced back as champions of the Aquitaine Division d'Honneur at the first attempt in 2004. After a fifth-place finish in 2005 they were champions of Group E in 2006, winning promotion to the fourth level again. This time they survived for three seasons before being relegated again in 2009. A third promotion from CFA2 was won in 2012.

The club achieved its best modern day performance in the Coupe de France in the 2012–13 edition of the competition, reaching the round of 32, most notably defeating Ligue 2 team Niort and Championnat National team Carquefou along the way, before losing to Lens.

In the summer of 2013, Stade Bordelais Omnisports merged with ASPTT Bordeaux to form the current organisation, and the football section gained its current name of Stade Bordelais ASPTT Football.

In 2015 the club achieved its highest ever ranking in the national league structure, finishing third in the group of the fourth level competition. Relegation followed quickly in 2016, but the club were promoted again in 2017 as champions of Group H.

In the 2019–20 season, they were positioned at the bottom of the Group C table when the season was prematurely terminated due to the COVID-19 pandemic, and were relegated to Championnat National 3.

== Honours ==
- Championnat de France Amateur 2 (tier-V)
  - Champions (3): 2006, 2012, 2017
- Division d'Honneur Aquitaine
  - Champions (6): 1920, 1924, 1926, 1929, 1950, 1997

== Current squad ==
As of 18 November 2020

Note: Flags indicate national team as defined under FIFA eligibility rules; some limited exceptions apply. Players may hold more than one non-FIFA nationality.

| No. | Pos. | Nation | Player |
|---|---|---|---|
| — | GK | FRA | Clement Botineau |
| — | GK | FRA | Anthony Loustallot |
| — | GK | FRA | Thomas Valverde |
| — | DF | FRA | Jonathan Abonckelet |
| — | DF | MAR | Nourddine Baskar |
| — | DF | FRA | François Chevalier |
| — | DF | FRA | Matthieu Dario |
| — | DF | MLI | Madigoundo Diakite |
| — | DF | FRA | Jordan Pinol |
| — | DF | FRA | Thomas Rios |
| — | DF | FRA | Omar Sané |
| — | MF | FRA | Walid Arab |
| — | MF | MTQ | Jeremie Bellune |
| — | MF | FRA | Mathieu Blasco |
| — | MF | FRA | Evan Chevalier |

| No. | Pos. | Nation | Player |
|---|---|---|---|
| — | MF | FRA | Moussa Dia |
| — | MF | BEL | Thomas Diaby |
| — | MF | FRA | Hugo Martin |
| — | MF | FRA | Teddy Nabab |
| — | MF | FRA | Karim Omayer |
| — | MF | FRA | Abderahim Sahoulba |
| — | MF | SEN | Moustapha Samb |
| — | MF | FRA | Patrick Tchoutang |
| — | MF | FRA | Nadim Mellah |
| — | FW | URU | Santiago Ciganda |
| — | FW | FRA | Balamine Cisse |
| — | FW | FRA | Sullivan Martinet |
| — | FW | FRA | Hady Sarr |
| — | FW | FRA | Malick Seck |
| — | FW | FRA | Souane Ahmadou |
