= Elio Rodríguez =

Uruguayan footballer (born 1962)

Personal information
- Full name: Elio Rodríguez
- Date of birth: November 13, 1962 (age 63)
- Place of birth: Rocha, Uruguay
- Position: Defender

Senior career*
Years	Team	Apps	(Gls)
1986–1987	Liverpool Montevideo		
1987–1992	Deportivo Mandiyú	88	(1)
1992–1993	Chaco For Ever		
1993	Cobreloa	1	(0)
1994	Huracán Buceo		
1994–1997	Villa Española		
1998	Frontera Rivera	6	(0)

Managerial career
- 2014–2016: Canadian
- 2016: Cerrito
- 2017: Huracán FC
- Central Español (youth)
- * Club domestic league appearances and goals

Elio Rodríguez (born November 13, 1962, in Rocha, Uruguay) is a former Uruguayan footballer who played for clubs of Uruguay, Argentina and Chile.

== Teams ==
- (Uruguay) Liverpool 1986–1987
- (Argentina) Deportivo Mandiyú 1987–1992
- (Argentina) Chaco For Ever 1992–1993
- (Chile) Cobreloa 1993
- (Uruguay) Huracán Buceo 1994
- (Uruguay) Villa Española 1997–1998
- (Uruguay) Frontera Rivera 1998

== Personal life ==
Rodríguez is the father of the twin siblings Déborah, an athlete and fashion model, and Ángel Rodríguez, a footballer.
