= Diego Gurri =

Uruguayan footballer (born 1993)

Personal information
- Full name: Diego Martín Gurri Bentancor
- Date of birth: 23 February 1993 (age 33)
- Place of birth: Montevideo, Uruguay
- Position: Left midfielder

Team information
- Current team: Boston River
- Number: 14

Youth career
- Unión Santa Rosa
- Boston River

Senior career*
Years	Team	Apps	(Gls)
2013–	Boston River	106	(22)
2017	→ Tigre (loan)	5	(0)
2018	→ Deportivo La Guaira (loan)	24	(2)
- * Club domestic league appearances and goals as of 13:21, 6 October 2020 (UTC)

Diego Martín Gurri Bentancor (born 23 February 1993) is a Uruguayan footballer who plays for Boston River.
