= Claudio Inella =

Uruguayan footballer (born 1990)

Personal information
- Full name: Claudio Gastón Inella Alderete
- Date of birth: November 26, 1990 (age 35)
- Place of birth: Paysandú, Uruguay
- Height: 1.85 m (6 ft 1 in)
- Position: Midfielder

Team information
- Current team: Huracan Buceo

Youth career
- –2009: Tacuarembó

Senior career*
Years	Team	Apps	(Gls)
2009–2011	Tacuarembó	22	(1)
2011–2016	River Plate	65	(2)
2015–2016	→ Sud América (loan)	0	(0)
2016	Cerro	1	(0)
2017–2018	Deportivo Maldonado	37	(0)
2019	Deportivo Malacateco	40	(1)
2020–	Huracan Buceo		
- * Club domestic league appearances and goals as of 20:19, 30 November 2020 (UTC)

Claudio Inella (born November 26, 1990) is an Uruguayan footballer who plays as a midfielder for Huracan Buceo.
