= Matías Rodríguez (footballer, born 1987) =

Argentine footballer

Personal information
- Full name: Matías Ezequiel Rodríguez
- Date of birth: 10 August 1987 (age 39)
- Place of birth: Argentina
- Height: 1.70 m (5 ft 7 in)
- Position: Forward

Youth career
- 2002–2007: Newell's Old Boys

Senior career*
Years	Team	Apps	(Gls)
2007–2010	Newell's Old Boys	0	(0)
2007–2008	→ Talleres (loan)		
2010	Colegio Nacional Iquitos	8	(0)
2011	Talleres		
- * Club domestic league appearances and goals

Matías Ezequiel Rodríguez (born 10 August 1987) is an Argentine footballer who plays as a forward.

== Career ==
Rodríguez started his senior career with Newell's Old Boys of the Argentine Primera División. He failed to make an appearance for the first-team, but did spend a season out on loan with Talleres in Torneo Argentino A. Rodríguez left Newell's in 2010 and subsequently joined Peruvian Torneo Descentralizado side Colegio Nacional Iquitos. He made his professional debut in a 1–1 draw with José Gálvez on 14 August 2010. Rodríguez departed at the end of the 2010 season after eight total appearances, he then permanently rejoined Talleres; then in Torneo Argentino B.
