= Jarro Pedroso =

Brazilian footballer

Personal information
- Full name: Emilton Pedroso Domingues
- Date of birth: 28 March 1993 (age 33)
- Place of birth: Pedro Osório, Brazil
- Height: 1.80 m (5 ft 11 in)
- Position: Forward

Team information
- Current team: Inter de Santa Maria

Youth career
- Farroupilha
- Bagé
- Pelotas
- Nacional (URU)
- 2015: Peñarol

Senior career*
| Years | Team | Apps | (Gls) |
| 2015 | Albion | | |
| 2016 | River Plate | 7 | (0) |
| 2017 | → Bento Gonçalves (loan) | 4 | (0) |
| 2018–2019 | → Pelotas-RS (loan) | 35 | (4) |
| 2019 | → Atlético Goianiense (loan) | 14 | (2) |
| 2019 | CSA | 9 | (1) |
| 2020–2021 | Brasil de Pelotas | 36 | (1) |
| 2021–2022 | Sampaio Corrêa | 6 | (0) |
| 2022 | Guarany Bagé | 7 | (0) |
| 2022 | Pelotas-RS | 0 | (0) |
| 2023 | São Luiz | 8 | (0) |
| 2023– | Inter de Santa Maria | 0 | (0) |
- * Club domestic league appearances and goals as of 8 March 2023

Emilton Pedroso Domingues, commonly known as Jarro Pedroso is a Brazilian footballer who plays as a forward for Inter de Santa Maria. He also holds Uruguayan nationality.

Born in Brazil, he played his youth football in Rio Grande do Sul and Uruguay, breaking into the first team with amateur side Albion in the third tier of Uruguayan football. In 2016 he moved to River Plate in Montevideo, where he made his debut in 2016 Copa Libertadores. He played for Pelotas in Campeonato Gaúcho in 2018 (second division) and 2019 (first division) before being loaned to Atlético Goianiense for the 2019 Campeonato Brasileiro Série B season.
