= Gonzalo Malán =

Uruguayan footballer (born 1988)

Personal information
- Full name: Gonzalo Daniel Malán Arenas
- Date of birth: 8 April 1988 (age 38)
- Place of birth: Nueva Helvecia, Uruguay
- Height: 1.86 m (6 ft 1 in)
- Position: Forward

Youth career
- Peñarol

Senior career*
| Years | Team | Apps | (Gls) |
| 2008–2009 | Peñarol | 0 | (0) |
| 2009 | Deportivo Maldonado | 6 | (2) |
| 2009–2010 | Juventud Las Piedras | | |
| 2010–2011 | Sud América | 11 | (4) |
| 2012 | Rentistas | 7 | (0) |
| 2012 | Alvarado | 7 | (0) |
| 2013–2016 | Sud América | 20 | (2) |
| 2014 | → Rampla Juniors (loan) | 13 | (7) |
| 2015 | → Deportes Antofagasta (loan) | 7 | (1) |
| 2015 | → Santiago Morning (loan) | 10 | (2) |
| 2016 | Plaza Colonia | 10 | (3) |
| 2017 | Birkirkara | 13 | (4) |
| 2017 | Juventud Las Piedras | 14 | (7) |
| 2018 | Atlético Venezuela | 12 | (1) |
| 2018 | Racing Montevideo | 7 | (0) |
| 2019 | Alebrijes de Oaxaca | 8 | (0) |
- * Club domestic league appearances and goals

Gonzalo Daniel Malán Arenas (born 8 April 1988) is an Uruguayan former footballer who played as a forward.

== Teams ==
- (Uruguay) Peñarol 2008–2009
- (Uruguay) Deportivo Maldonado 2009
- (Uruguay) Juventud de Las Piedras 2009–2010
- (Uruguay) Sud América 2010–2011
- (Uruguay) Rentistas 2012
- (Argentina) Alvarado 2012
- (Uruguay) Sud América 2013–2014
- (Uruguay) Rampla Juniors 2014
- (Chile) Deportes Antofagasta 2015
- (Chile) Santiago Morning 2015
- (Uruguay) Sud América 2016
- (Uruguay) Plaza Colonia 2016
- (Malta) Birkirkara 2017
- (Uruguay) Juventud de Las Piedras 2017
- Atlético Venezuela 2018
- (Uruguay) Racing Club de Montevideo 2018
- (Mexico) Alebrijes de Oaxaca 2019

== Personal life ==
His younger brothers, Cristian and Matías, were also professional footballers.
