= Camilo Núñez =

Uruguayan footballer

Personal information
- Full name: Camilo Alejandro Núñez Gómez
- Date of birth: 6 March 1994 (age 32)
- Place of birth: Montevideo, Uruguay
- Height: 1.78 m (5 ft 10 in)
- Position: Midfielder

Youth career
- Rentistas

Senior career*
Years	Team	Apps	(Gls)
2014–2019	Rentistas	72	(5)
2017	→ Plaza Colonia (loan)	19	(3)
2020–2021	Fénix	20	(2)
2021	Atenas	19	(1)
2022–2023	Fénix	63	(0)
2024–2026	Deportes Temuco	80	(10)
- * Club domestic league appearances and goals as of 13 November 2024

Camilo Alejandro Núñez Gómez (born 6 March 1994) is a Uruguayan footballer who plays as a midfielder.

== Club career ==
Born in Montevideo, Uruguay, Núñez started his career with Rentistas in the Uruguayan top division, making his debut in August 2015. In 2017, he was loaned out to Plaza Colonia.

In 2020, he joined Fénix, with whom he took part in the Copa Sudamericana. The next year, he switched to Atenas de San Carlos, returning to Fénix in January 2022.

In 2024, Núñez moved abroad and joined Deportes Temuco in the Primera B de Chile.
