= Walter Vaz =

French footballer (born 1990)

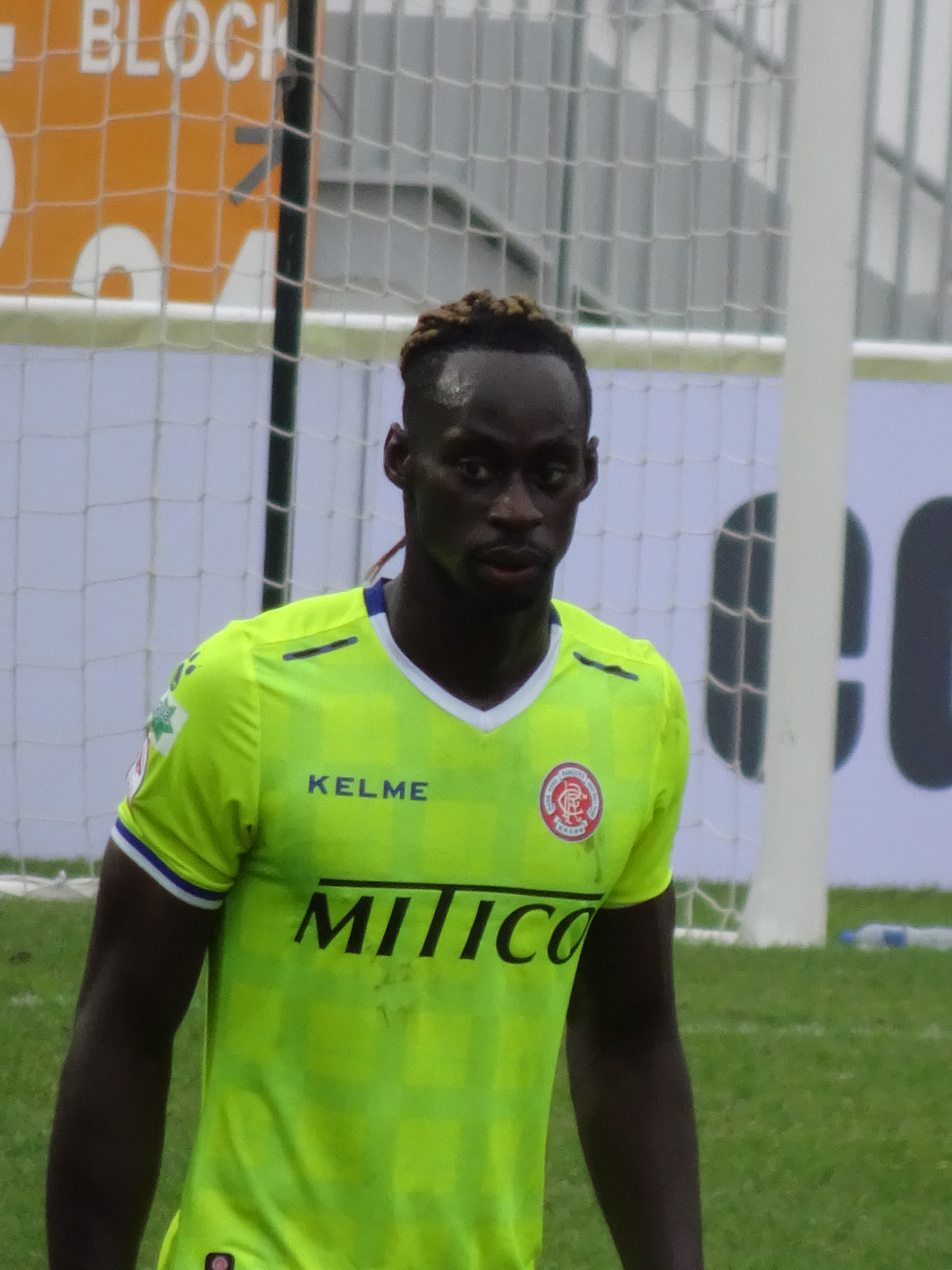
- Vaz in 2018 with Biu Chun Rangers

Personal information
- Full name: Walter Vaz Correa
- Date of birth: 24 May 1990 (age 36)
- Place of birth: Montmorency, France
- Height: 1.93 m (6 ft 4 in)
- Position: Forward

Team information
- Current team: South China

Senior career*
| Years | Team | Apps | (Gls) |
| 2014–2016 | River Plate Montevideo | 12 | (0) |
| 2016 | Tanque Sisley | 5 | (1) |
| 2016–2017 | Southern District | 9 | (2) |
| 2017–2018 | Hong Kong Rangers | 6 | (0) |
| 2018 | Härnösand | | |
| 2018–2019 | APO Amvrysseas | | |
| 2019–2021 | PAO Varda | | |
| 2021–2022 | Happy Valley | 12 | (14) |
| 2022–2023 | South China | 19 | (27) |
| 2023–2024 | Kowloon City | 4 | (2) |
| 2024– | South China | 10 | (11) |
- * Club domestic league appearances and goals as of 18 September 2023

Walter Vaz Correa (born 24 May 1990) is a French professional footballer who plays as a forward for Hong Kong First Division club South China.

== Career ==
Vaz began his career in 2014 with River Plate Montevideo, where he started playing early in 2014.

He was signed by Hong Kong Rangers in December 2017 but terminated his contract with the club in the following month.

On 7 April 2018, Vaz appeared in his first match for Swedish club Härnösand.

== Personal life ==
Vaz is of Bissau-Guinean descent.
