= Luis Torrecilla =

Uruguayan footballer (born 1989)

Personal information
- Full name: Luis Alberto Torrecilla Michelle
- Date of birth: March 18, 1989 (age 37)
- Place of birth: Montevideo, Uruguay
- Height: 1.75 m (5 ft 9 in)
- Position: Defender

Youth career
- River Plate

Senior career*
Years	Team	Apps	(Gls)
2009–2016	River Plate Montevideo	63	(5)
2011–2012	→ Rentistas (loan)		
2016–	Liverpool Montevideo	0	(0)
- * Club domestic league appearances and goals

Luis Alberto Torrecilla Michelle (born March 18, 1989) is a Uruguayan footballer who plays as a defender.

== Career ==
Torrecilla began his career in 2009 with River Plate Montevideo, where he played for six seasons, until now.
