= Santiago Ciganda =

Uruguayan footballer (born 1994)

Personal information
- Full name: Santiago Ciganda Forni
- Date of birth: 16 January 1994 (age 32)
- Place of birth: Montevideo, Uruguay
- Height: 1.80 m (5 ft 11 in)
- Position: Forward

Team information
- Current team: Flaminia

Youth career
- 2010–2013: Nacional
- 2013–2015: River Plate

Senior career*
| Years | Team | Apps | (Gls) |
| 2015–2016 | River Plate | 11 | (1) |
| 2016–2017 | Deportivo Maldonado | 22 | (5) |
| 2018 | Cerro | 22 | (0) |
| 2019–2020 | Deportivo Coopsol | 19 | (5) |
| 2020–2021 | Stade Bordelais | 5 | (1) |
| 2021 | Nereto FC | 6 | (1) |
| 2021–2022 | Foligno | 20 | (9) |
| 2022–2023 | Stade Bordelais | 24 | (7) |
| 2023–2024 | Angoulême | 23 | (8) |
| 2024– | Flaminia | 6 | (1) |
- * Club domestic league appearances and goals as of 17 November 2024

Santiago Ciganda Forni (born 16 January 1994) is an Uruguayan footballer who plays as a forward for Italian Serie D club Flaminia.

== Career ==
Ciganda began his career in 2015 with River Plate Montevideo, where he played for one season.

After a spell at French club Stade Bordelais in the 2020-21 season, Ciganda moved to Italian Serie D club Nereto FC on 23 September 2021. Less than two months later, on 5 November 2021, Ciganda moved to fellow league club Foligno.
