= Alex Silva (footballer, born 1990) =

Uruguayan footballer

Personal information
- Full name: Alexander Maximiliano Silva Garrel
- Date of birth: 14 November 1990 (age 35)
- Place of birth: Montevideo, Uruguay
- Height: 1.90 m (6 ft 3 in)
- Position: Forward

Senior career*
Years	Team	Apps	(Gls)
2009–2011	Central Español	16	(1)
2011–2013	Boston River	21	(1)
2014	Oriental	0	(0)
2014	Parrillas One	1	(0)
2015–2016	Villa Española	13	(4)
2015	→ Oriental (loan)	7	(7)
2016	→ Ñublense (loan)	13	(1)
2016	→ Montevideo City (loan)	8	(3)
2017–2018	Rampla Juniors	29	(11)
2018	Quilmes	5	(1)
2018–2019	Fénix	34	(9)
2020	Progreso	14	(5)
2021–2022	Deportivo Maldonado		
- * Club domestic league appearances and goals

Alexander Maximiliano Silva Garrel (born 14 November 1990) is an Uruguayan former footballer.

== Career ==
=== Club career ===
In January 2020, Silva moved to Progreso.
