= Rodrigo Rivero =

Uruguayan footballer (born 1995)

Personal information
- Full name: Rodrigo Rivero Fernández
- Date of birth: 27 December 1995 (age 30)
- Place of birth: Colonia del Sacramento, Uruguay
- Height: 1.72 m (5 ft 8 in)
- Position: Winger

Team information
- Current team: Montevideo Wanderers
- Number: 7

Youth career
- –2012: Juventud de Colonia
- 2012–2015: Montevideo Wanderers

Senior career*
| Years | Team | Apps | (Gls) |
| 2014–2018 | Montevideo Wanderers | 79 | (11) |
| 2019–2024 | Libertad | 20 | (1) |
| 2021 | → Montevideo Wanderers (loan) | 13 | (1) |
| 2022–2023 | → Liverpool (URU) (loan) | 52 | (5) |
| 2024 | → Emelec (loan) | 16 | (2) |
| 2025– | Montevideo Wanderers | 10 | (5) |
- * Club domestic league appearances and goals as of 3 May 2025

Rodrigo Rivero Fernández (born 27 December 1995) is a Uruguayan footballer who plays as a winger for Montevideo Wanderers.
