= Wellington Baroni =

Brazilian footballer (born 1989)

Personal information
- Date of birth: 1 April 1989 (age 37)
- Place of birth: Curitiba, Brazil
- Height: 1.79 m (5 ft 10 in)
- Position: Left-back

Team information
- Current team: PSTC

Youth career
- Paraná

Senior career*
Years	Team	Apps	(Gls)
2008	Paraná		
2009	Iguaçu		
2009	Espanyol		
2009–2011	→ Panionios (loan)	14	(0)
2011–2012	→ Lajeadense (loan)	12	(0)
2012–2013	Santa Cruz	13	(1)
2014	Esportivo	11	(0)
2014	Andraus		
2015	JMalucelli		
2015	River Plate		
2016–	PSTC		
- * Club domestic league appearances and goals

Wellington Baroni (born 1 April 1989) is a Brazilian professional footballer who plays for PSTC in Brazil, as a left-back. In June 2009 he signed for Spanish club Espanyol from Iguaçu and was sent on loan to Greek side Panionios.
