= Andrés Barboza =

Uruguayan footballer (born 1994)

Personal information
- Full name: Eduar Andrés Barboza Cubilla
- Date of birth: 23 July 1994 (age 32)
- Place of birth: Montevideo, Uruguay
- Height: 1.79 m (5 ft 10 in)
- Position: Centre-back

Team information
- Current team: San Marcos

Youth career
- Cerro

Senior career*
Years	Team	Apps	(Gls)
2012–2017	Cerro	36	(0)
2017–2018	Fénix	44	(1)
2019	Mineros de Zacatecas	4	(0)
2020–2022	Fénix	51	(2)
2023–2024	Santiago Wanderers	40	(2)
2025–2026	Fénix	45	(5)
2026–	San Marcos	0	(0)
- * Club domestic league appearances and goals as of 11 July 2026

Eduar Andrés Barboza Cubilla (born 23 July 1994), known as Andrés Barboza, is a Uruguayan footballer who plays as a centre-back for Chilean club San Marcos de Arica.

== Club career ==
Barboza began his career with Cerro and next he played for Fénix in the Uruguayan Primera División until 2018.

In 2019, he moved to Mexico and joined Mineros de Zacatecas.

In 2020, Barboza returned to his homeland and rejoined Fénix for three seasons.

In 2023, he moved abroad again and signed with Chilean club Santiago Wanderers.

In July 2026, Barboza returned to Chile with San Marcos de Arica.
