= Ricardo Lima =

Brazilian footballer

Personal information
- Full name: Ricardo Régis Aparecido de Lima
- Date of birth: 20 February 1994 (age 32)
- Place of birth: Jandaia do Sul, Brazil
- Height: 1.89 m (6 ft 2 1/2 in)
- Position: Centre-back

Team information
- Current team: Persipura Jayapura
- Number: 4

Senior career*
Years	Team	Apps	(Gls)
2013	União São João	6	(0)
2014	Barbarense	0	(0)
2015–2016	Metropolitano	23	(2)
2016–2017	River Plate	10	(1)
2018	Iporá	12	(1)
2019	Madureira	0	(0)
2019	Aparecidense	3	(0)
2019	Jataiense	11	(2)
2020	Linense	7	(0)
2020–2021	Aparecidense	17	(3)
2021–2022	Vila Nova	6	(0)
2022	→ Aparecidense (loan)	17	(1)
2023	Caxias	25	(1)
2024	Floresta	16	(0)
2024–2025	Persis Solo	7	(1)
2025–2026	MOI Kompong Dewa	19	(3)
2026–	Persipura Jayapura	4	(0)
- * Club domestic league appearances and goals as of 2 October 2026

Ricardo Régis Aparecido de Lima (born 20 February 1994) is a Brazilian professional footballer who plays as a centre-back for Championship club Persipura Jayapura.

== Career ==
Lima began his career in 2013 with União São João.
