= Robert Mario Flores =

Uruguayan footballer (born 1986)

Robert Flores
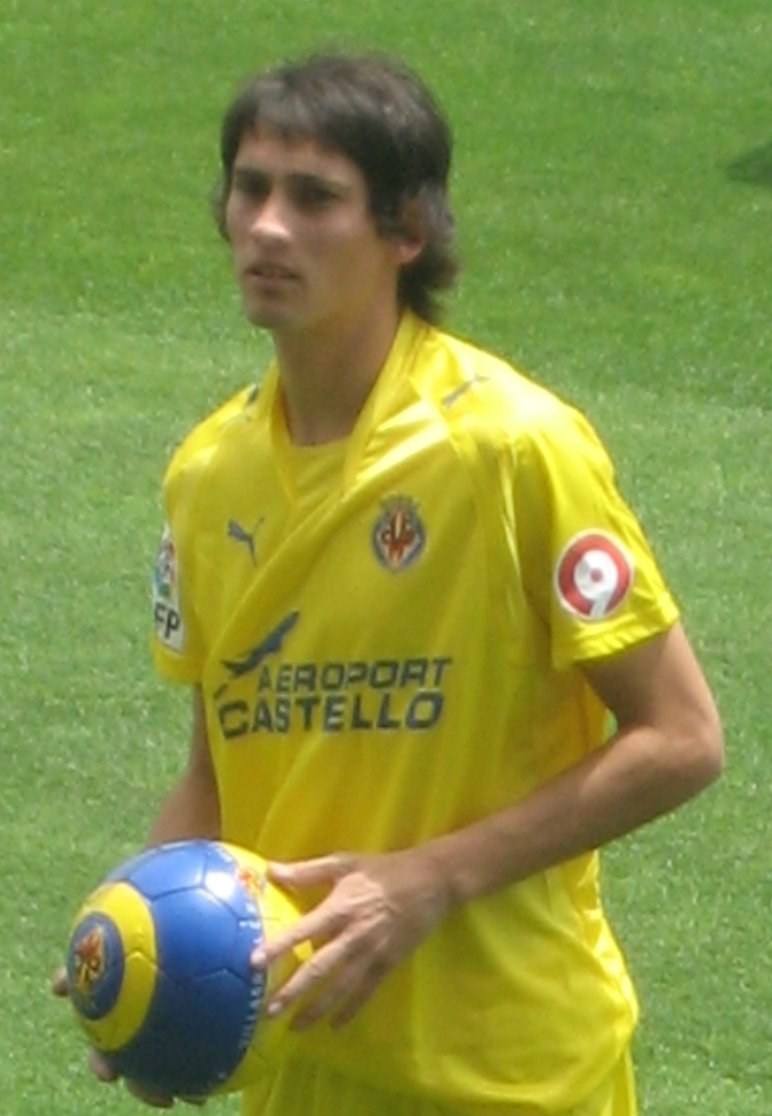
- Flores during his presentation in Villarreal.

Personal information
- Full name: Robert Mario Flores Bistolfi
- Date of birth: 13 May 1986 (age 40)
- Place of birth: Canelones, Uruguay
- Height: 1.79 m (5 ft 10 in)
- Position: Attacking midfielder

Team information
- Current team: Boston River
- Number: 10

Youth career
- 1998–2006: River Plate UY

Senior career*
Years	Team	Apps	(Gls)
2006–2008	River Plate UY	15	(3)
2008–2011	Villarreal B	24	(1)
2008–2009	→ River Plate (loan)	13	(2)
2010–2011	→ Nacional (loan)	15	(0)
2011	Litex Lovech	9	(0)
2012	Palestino	36	(1)
2013	Deportivo Quito	32	(1)
2014	Sport Recife	30	(2)
2014–2016	River Plate UY	36	(2)
2016–	Boston River	76	(2)

International career
2008	Uruguay	2	(0)
- * Club domestic league appearances and goals as of 13:16, 6 October 2020 (UTC)

Robert Mario Flores Bistolfi (born 13 May 1986) is a Uruguayan footballer who plays for Boston River as an attacking midfielder.

His brother Darío is also a professional footballer.

== Club career ==
=== River Plate ===
Born in Canelones Department, Flores moved to the capital of his country, Montevideo and began his football career at Club Atlético River Plate. He was promoted to the senior squad in January 2006, aged 19, and had two successful seasons. On 21 June 2008, he completed his move to La Liga side Villarreal for a US$2.1 million deal.

On 18 July 2008, it was confirmed that Flores joined Argentine Primera División powerhouse River Plate on loan. On 10 August, he debuted in a 1–1 draw with Colón de Santa Fe at Estanislao López for the first week of the Apertura Tournament, in which Flores scored the equalizer for his team in the 54th minute. After the match, he was compared with his compatriot and River Plate idol, Enzo Francescoli, by several television channels in Argentina, including ESPN, Fox Sports and TyC Sports. Despite his promising start, he was not able to adjust well and did not play much with coach Diego Simeone, but after of Simeone's departure, Flores began playing more with the caretaker manager Gabriel Rodríguez.

Flores took part of the pre–season training with River, in January 2009, playing one game in the Summer Tournament against Boca Juniors, the biggest rival of the team. He made his official debut for the Copa Libertadores on 12 February against Nacional de Paraguay, playing 46 minutes in his side's 1–0 home win. After two months without playing, on 30 April, Flores played his first full 90 minutes in the season against the Peruvian side Universidad San Martín de Porres, in a 3–0 victory for the 2009 Copa Libertadores. On 13 June, he scored in a victory against Tigre, his first goal in ten months and three days, since his debut at Santa Fe.

=== Villarreal and Nacional ===
After a regular pass in Argentina, he completed his loan spell with River Plate, and moved to La Liga side Villarreal, days later of his last game for River against Godoy Cruz. On 25 June 2009, Flores was officially presented in the club based in town located at Valencian Community, however he accepted his role in the reserve team, Villarreal B that play in the Liga Adelante, being also confirmed that he would play some games with the first team.

On 29 August 2009, Flores made his club debut in a 2–2 home draw with UD Levante at El Madrigal Stadium. During the season he played one goal in 24 appearances with the team, but failed to play games with Villarreal in the 2009–10 season of the Spain's Liga BBVA, because the coach Juan Carlos Garrido not considered him in the first team.

On 11 June 2010, it was confirmed that he joined to Uruguayan Primera División powerhouse team Club Nacional de Football in a one-year deal, along with Mariano Pernía, the former left back of Atlético Madrid. Flores made his debut in a 1–1 away draw with Montevideo Wanderers at Centenario Stadium. He had a very regular first season with Nacional, playing only seven games since his incorporation during the Apertura Tournament, and was red carded for first time in his career in a 2–1 home win over Danubio at Estadio Parque Central. During the season, was not considered by the coach Juan Ramón Carrasco, who directed him during his successful pass at River Plate Montevideo, due to his lack of form.

The next season, he played his first Copa Libertadores game with Nacional in a 2–0 away defeat against América at the Estadio Azteca. Flores was frequently used as left midfielder by Juan Ramón and began to win a place in the team's starting lineup, proclaiming after champion of the Clausura Tournament. After the sorpressive departure of the coach Carrasco, and the also sorpressive arrival of his teammate Marcelo Gallardo as coach, he was not considered by him and weeks later, Flores moved to Bulgarian First Division side Litex Lovech.

=== Palestino ===
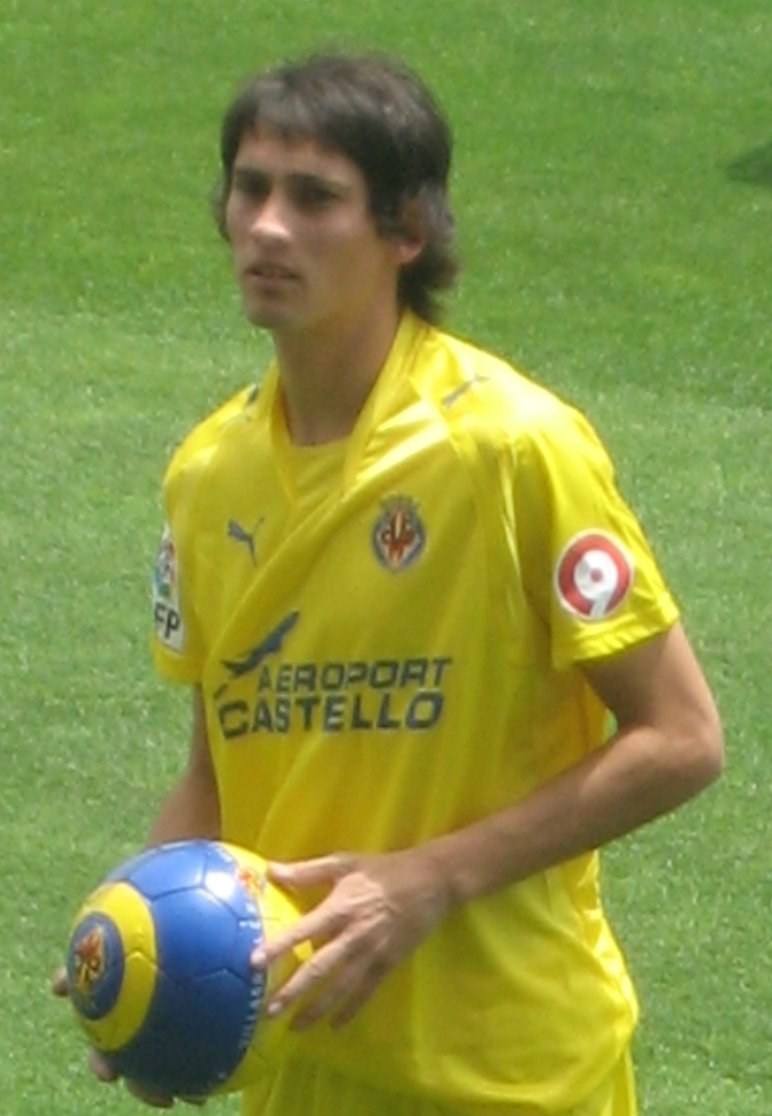
Flores during his presentation at Villarreal.

On 24 December 2011, Flores joined to Chilean Primera División club Palestino, in where play his brother Darío. He joined in a free transfer and signed a one–season contract that will keep him until December 2012, being also named as the best signing of the tournament on 28 January 2012 according to the web site of La Tercera newspaper.

Flores debuted for the club based in La Cisterna, for the first week of the Apertura Tournament on 30 January 2012, in a 2–1 loss with Universidad Católica at the Estadio Nacional, in where he was the key player of his team, having a very high performance, being again compared with Enzo Francescoli like when he played in Argentina with River Plate, but now by TVN journalist Fernando Solabarrieta at 24 Horas Central. His first goal in the Chile came on 24 March against Audax Italiano in a 2–1 away win at the Estadio Bicentenario de La Florida for the fifth week of the tournament. Another good game of Flores in the season was against Colo-Colo at the Estadio Monumental on 25 March, in where his team won of incredible form 1–0 with tremor inclusive. During that game, Robert collaborated very much for his team that is directed by his compatriot Daniel Carreño, his major input was his assist in the moment of the goal.

== International career ==
He received first cap at the friendly match against Turkey on 25 May 2008.

== Career statistics ==
Club	Season	League		Cup		Continental		Total	
Club	Season	Apps	Goals	Apps	Goals	Apps	Goals	Apps	Goals
River Plate	2008–09	13	2	–	–	3	0	16	2
River Plate	Total	13	2	–	–	3	0	16	2
Villarreal B	2009–10	24	1	0	0	–	–	24	1
Villarreal B	Total	24	1	0	0	–	–	24	1
Nacional	2010–11	15	0	–	–	2	0	17	0
Nacional	Total	15	0	–	–	2	0	17	0
Litex Lovech	2011–12	9	0	0	0	4	0	13	0
Litex Lovech	Total	9	0	0	0	4	0	13	0
Palestino	2012	12	1	0	0	–	–	12	1
Palestino	Total	12	1	0	0	–	–	12	1
Career total		73	4	0	0	9	0	82	4

== Honours ==
=== Club ===
Nacional

- Uruguayan Primera División: 2010–11

Sport Recife

- Copa do Nordeste: 2014
