= Cristhian Maciel =

Uruguayan footballer (born 1992)

Personal information
- Full name: Cristhian Stivens Maciel Gallo
- Date of birth: 12 February 1992 (age 34)
- Place of birth: Montevideo, Uruguay
- Height: 1.74 m (5 ft 9 in)
- Position: Central midfielder

Youth career
- 2009–2011: River Plate

Senior career*
Years	Team	Apps	(Gls)
2011–2017	River Plate	6	(0)
2015–2016	→ Tacuarembó (loan)	31	(1)
2017	Deportivo Guastatoya	14	(0)
2018–2019	Jocoro F.C.	11	(2)
- * Club domestic league appearances and goals

Cristhian Stivens Maciel Gallo (born 12 February 1992) is an Uruguayan professional footballer, who plays as a central midfielder.

== Club career ==
=== Club Atlético River Plate ===
Maciel started his career playing with River Plate. He made his professional debut during the 2012/13 season.

=== Jocoro ===
Maciel signed with Jocoro of the Salvadoran Primera División in the Apertura 2018 tournament. Jocoro was the newly promoted team for this tournament. In September 2018, Maciel suffered a severe injury in a game against Luis Ángel Firpo. Jocoro won 3–1.

However, Maciel returned with the team for a game against Chalatenango.
