= Ángel Rodríguez (footballer, born 1992) =

Uruguayan footballer

Personal information
- Full name: Ángel Leonardo Rodríguez Güelmo
- Date of birth: 2 December 1992 (age 33)
- Place of birth: Montevideo, Uruguay
- Height: 1.74 m (5 ft 8 1/2 in)
- Position: Defensive midfielder

Team information
- Current team: Deportivo Maldonado
- Number: 27

Youth career
- 2006–2012: Defensor

Senior career*
Years	Team	Apps	(Gls)
2012–2013	Defensor	3	(0)
2013–2016	River Plate	50	(2)
2016–2018	Peñarol	21	(0)
2018	→ Unión La Calera (loan)	26	(0)
2019	Bolívar	2	(0)
2020–2021	Fénix	61	(1)
2022	Deportivo Maldonado	31	(1)
2023	César Vallejo	11	(0)
2023–	Deportivo Maldonado	23	(0)
- * Club domestic league appearances and goals as of 15 September 2024

Ángel Leonardo Rodríguez Güelmo (born 2 December 1992) is a Uruguayan footballer who plays as a defensive midfielder for Deportivo Maldonado.

== Career ==
Rodríguez began his career in 2013 with River Plate Montevideo, where he played for three seasons, until now.

== Personal life ==
He is the twin brother of athlete and fashion model Déborah Rodríguez and son of manager Elio Rodríguez.
