= Alexander Rosso =

Uruguayan footballer (born 1993)

Personal information
- Full name: Alexander Mauricio Rosso Génova
- Date of birth: 27 February 1993 (age 33)
- Place of birth: Montevideo, Uruguay
- Height: 1.75 m (5 ft 9 in)
- Position: Forward

Team information
- Current team: Gualaceo
- Number: 93

Youth career
- –2012: River Plate

Senior career*
| Years | Team | Apps | (Gls) |
| 2012−2018 | River Plate Montevideo | 67 | (10) |
| 2018 | Progreso | 18 | (4) |
| 2018 | UCV | 9 | (2) |
| 2019−2021 | Progreso | 38 | (6) |
| 2022 | Villa Española | 25 | (1) |
| 2023 | Progreso | 12 | (1) |
| 2024– | Gualaceo | 12 | (1) |
- * Club domestic league appearances and goals as of 13 September 2024

Alexander Mauricio Rosso Génova (born 27 February 1993) is a Uruguayan footballer who plays for Ecuadorian club Gualaceo.

== Career ==
Rosso began his career in 2012 with River Plate Montevideo, where he played for three seasons, until now.
