= Martín Alaniz =

Uruguayan footballer (born 1993)

Personal information
- Full name: Diego Martín Alaniz Ávila
- Date of birth: 19 February 1993 (age 33)
- Place of birth: Melo, Uruguay
- Height: 1.75 m (5 ft 9 in)
- Position: Winger

Team information
- Current team: Blooming
- Number: 50

Youth career
- Defensor Sporting

Senior career*
Years	Team	Apps	(Gls)
2011–2013	Defensor Sporting	0	(0)
2011–2012	→ Juventud (loan)	12	(2)
2013–2018	River Plate	44	(5)
2014–2015	→ Morelia (loan)	14	(2)
2015	→ Argentinos Juniors (loan)	6	(0)
2016	→ Chapecoense (loan)	0	(0)
2016–2017	→ Oviedo (loan)	5	(0)
2017	→ Racing de Montevideo (loan)	6	(1)
2017–2018	Guayaquil City	26	(6)
2018	→ Liverpool Montevideo (loan)	13	(1)
2018	→ Hapoel Ra'anana (loan)	9	(1)
2019	Cafetaleros de Tapachula	14	(5)
2020–21	Delfín	3	(0)
2020–21	→ Orense (loan)	15	(4)
2021	Manta	28	(6)
2021	→ Orense (loan)	2	(0)
2022–23	Guabirá	29	(9)
2023	Cerro Largo	14	(2)
2024	Aurora	12	(2)
2024	Guanacasteca	7	(1)
2025–	Blooming	22	(5)
- * Club domestic league appearances and goals as of 30 December 2025

Diego Martín Alaniz Ávila (born 19 February 1993) is an Uruguayan footballer who plays for Club Blooming. as a winger.

== Club career ==
Born in Melo, Alaniz was a Defensor Sporting youth graduate. He was loaned to Juventud de Las Piedras in September 2011, making his debut on 15 October by coming on as a late substitute in a 1–0 win against Villa Teresa. He scored his first goal late in the month, netting the game's only in a success over Tacuarembó.

After achieving top level promotion with Juventud, Alaniz returned to Defensor but was not utilized. In January 2013 he moved to River Plate, making his debut for the club on 24 March by replacing Lucas Olaza in a 2–4 loss at Liverpool.

In July 2014, Alaniz was loaned to Mexican club Monarcas Morelia. He subsequently represented Argentinos Juniors, Chapecoense and Real Oviedo, all in temporary deals.
