= Pablo González (Uruguayan footballer) =

Uruguayan footballer (born 1995)

Personal information
- Full name: Pablo Agustín González Ferrón
- Date of birth: July 3, 1995 (age 31)
- Place of birth: rivera, Uruguay
- Height: 1.80 m (5 ft 11 in)
- Position: Central midfielder

Youth career
- 2011–2015: River Plate

Senior career*
Years	Team	Apps	(Gls)
2015–2018	River Plate	18	(0)
2016–2017	→ Villa Española (loan)	6	(0)
2017	→ Juventud (loan)	1	(0)
2019–2021	Bella Vista	2	(0)
2021	Tacuarembó	0	(0)
2021–2022	River Plate	1	(0)
- * Club domestic league appearances and goals as of 22 Jul 2022

Pablo Agustín González Ferrón (born July 3, 1995) is a Uruguayan professional footballer. He is currently a free agent.

== Club career ==
González started his career playing with River Plate. He made his professional debut during the 2015/16 season.
