= Estadio Municipal Casto Martínez Laguarda =

Multi-sports facility in San José de Mayo, Uruguay

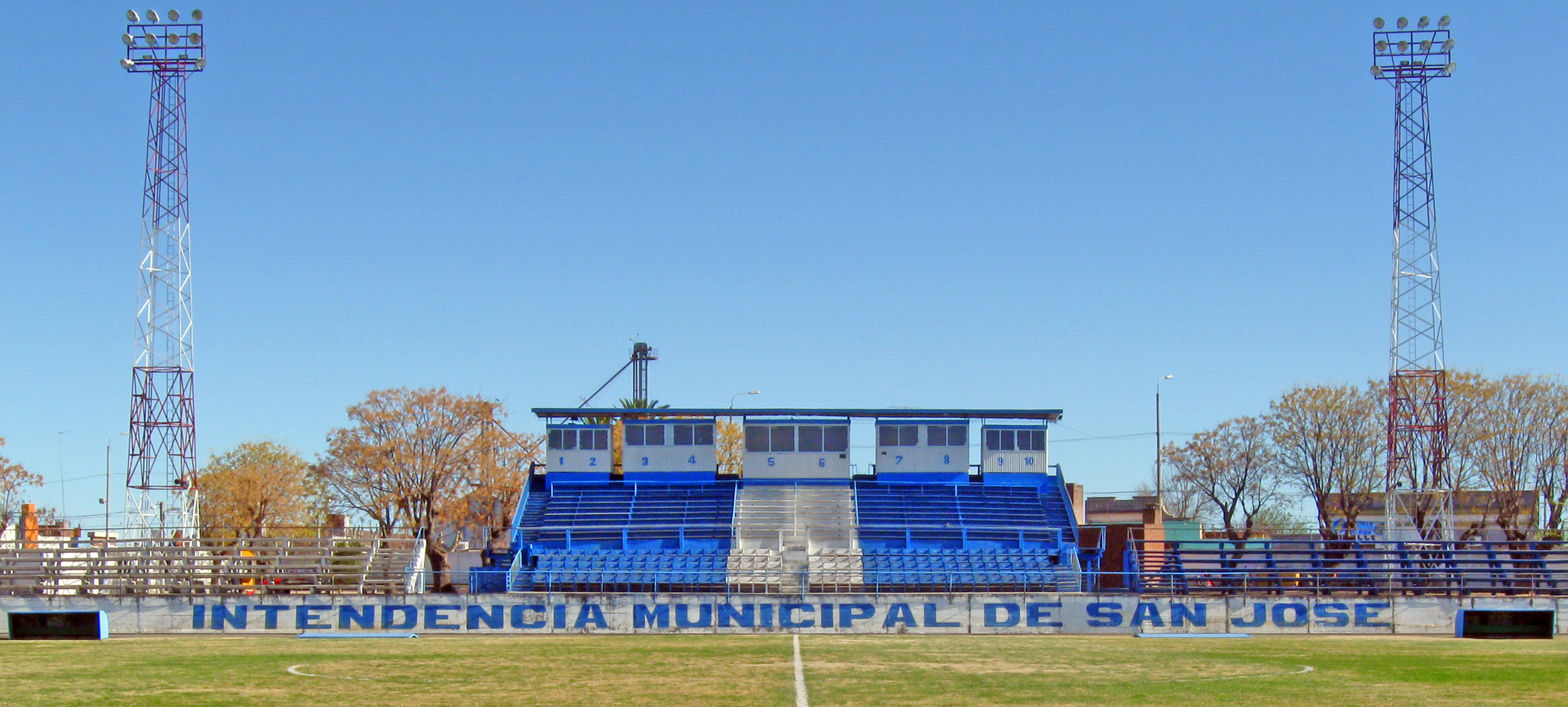
- Interactive map of Estadio Municipal Casto Martínez Laguarda
- Full name: Estadio Municipal Casto Martínez Laguarda
- Location: San José de Mayo, Uruguay
- Coordinates: 34.32934°S 56.71048°W
- Owner: San José Department
- Capacity: 3,800
- Surface: grass

Tenant
- Intendencia de San José

Estadio Municipal Casto Martínez Laguarda is a multi-sports stadium in San José de Mayo, Uruguay. It is currently used mostly for football matches, and also for track and field competitions and rugby union events. The stadium holds 3,800 people. It is the home stadium of the local team.
