= Darío Flores =

Uruguayan footballer (born 1984)

Personal information
- Full name: Dario Antonio Flores Bistolfi
- Date of birth: February 6, 1984 (age 42)
- Place of birth: Montevideo, Uruguay
- Height: 1.86 m (6 ft 1 in)
- Position: Centre-back

Team information
- Current team: Central Español
- Number: 4

Youth career
- 2001–2003: River Plate

Senior career*
Years	Team	Apps	(Gls)
2003–2005	River Plate	31	(5)
2006–2007	Peñarol	23	(2)
2007	Montevideo Wanderers	9	(0)
2008	River Plate	28	(0)
2009–2011	CFR Cluj	14	(1)
2010–2011	→ Racing Club (loan)	24	(0)
2011–2012	Palestino	21	(1)
2012–2013	Rampla Juniors	7	(0)
2013	Cerro Largo	14	(1)
2013–2014	Juventud de Las Piedras	25	(3)
2014	Perugia	7	(0)
2014–2015	Matera	14	(0)
2015–2016	River Plate	25	(0)
2016–2017	Municipal	31	(0)
2017	Mineros de Guayana	0	(0)
2017	Cerro	10	(0)
2018	Pontevedra	10	(1)
2018–2019	Boston River	13	(0)
2019	Central Español	9	(0)
2020	Atenas	0	(0)
2020–	Central Español	17	(0)

International career
2005	Uruguay	1	(0)
Medal record
CFR Cluj
Winner	Romanian Cup	2009
- * Club domestic league appearances and goals as of 10:06, 20 March 2021 (UTC)

Darío Antonio Flores Bistolfi (born February 6, 1984) is a Uruguayan professional footballer who plays as a centre-back for Central Español.

== Career ==
Born in Montevideo, Flores began his career with River Plate (Uruguay) of the Uruguayan Primera División. In winter 2005–06 he joined Peñarol. After one season for Peñarol he moved to Montevideo Wanderers in January 2007.

In February 2008 Flores returned to his youth club River Plate. On 7 January 2009, he signed for CFR Cluj.

== Personal life ==
His brother, Robert Flores, is also a professional footballer.

== Honours ==
- Cupa României: 2008–09
