= Agustín Ale =

Uruguayan footballer (born 1995)

Personal information
- Full name: Agustín Ale Perego
- Date of birth: 19 February 1995 (age 31)
- Place of birth: Las Piedras, Uruguay
- Height: 1.95 m (6 ft 5 in)
- Position: Centre-back

Team information
- Current team: AP Aurora Treia 1966

Youth career
- 2009–2014: River Plate MVD

Senior career*
Years	Team	Apps	(Gls)
2014–2021	River Plate MVD	127	(2)
2020–2021	→ Delfin (loan)	20	(2)
2021	Guayaquil City	10	(0)
2021–2022	Olimpia	2	(0)
2022	Académica de Coimbra	0	(0)
2022–2023	ASD San Luca	31	(2)
2023–2025	Imolese	58	(1)
2025–2026	San Marino	30	(0)
2026–	AP Aurora Treia 1966		

International career
2014–2015	Uruguay U20	15	(1)
Medal record
Men's football
Representing Uruguay
South American U-20 Championship
Third place	2015 Uruguay
- * Club domestic league appearances and goals as of 19 November 2026

Agustín Ale Perego (born 19 February 1995) is a Uruguayan professional footballer who plays as a centre-back for AP Aurora Treia 1966.

== Club career ==
A youth academy product of River Plate, Ale made his professional debut on 23 November 2014 in a 2–0 league win against Racing Club. He scored his professional goal on 16 October 2016 in a 2–1 league win against Plaza Colonia.

On 17 January 2020, Ecuadorian club Delfín announced the signing of Ale on a season long loan deal with an option to buy.

== International career ==
Ale is a former Uruguay youth international and was part of under-20 team which finished third at 2015 South American U-20 Championship.

== Career statistics ==
=== Club ===
As of 10 March 2020

Appearances and goals by club, season and competition
Club	Season	League			Cup		Continental		Other		Total	
Club	Season	Division	Apps	Goals	Apps	Goals	Apps	Goals	Apps	Goals	Apps	Goals
River Plate	2014–15	Uruguayan Primera División	11	0	—		—		—		11	0
River Plate	2015–16	Uruguayan Primera División	13	0	—		5 (Note: Appearances in Copa Libertadores)	0	—		18	0
River Plate	2016	Uruguayan Primera División	13	1	—		—		—		13	1
River Plate	2017	Uruguayan Primera División	28	0	—		—		—		28	0
River Plate	2018	Uruguayan Primera División	33	1	—		—		—		33	1
River Plate	2019	Uruguayan Primera División	28	0	—		4 (Note: Appearances in Copa Sudamericana)	0	1 (Note: Appearance in Torneo Intermedio final)	0	33	0
River Plate	Total		126	2	0	0	9	0	1	0	136	2
Delfín	2020	Ecuadorian Serie A	4	0	0	0	2	0	1 (Note: Appearance in Supercopa Ecuador)	0	7	0
Career total			130	2	0	0	11	0	2	0	143	2
