= Franco Romero (footballer, born 1995) =

Uruguayan footballer

Personal information
- Full name: Franco Gastón Romero Ponte
- Date of birth: 11 February 1995 (age 31)
- Place of birth: Montevideo, Uruguay
- Height: 1.85 m (6 ft 1 in)
- Position: Defender

Team information
- Current team: Peñarol
- Number: 4

Senior career*
Years	Team	Apps	(Gls)
2014–2019	Racing Club	78	(3)
2019–2021	Liverpool Montevideo	43	(4)
2021–2022	Volos	23	(0)
2022–2023	Bellinzona	27	(1)
2023–2024	Nacional	16	(0)
2024–2025	Sporting Cristal	24	(0)
2025–2026	Farense	16	(1)
2026	Montevideo City Torque	15	(1)
2026–	Peñarol	5	(1)
- * Club domestic league appearances and goals as of 13 September 2026

Franco Gastón Romero Ponte (born 11 February 1995) is a Uruguayan footballer who plays as a defender for Peñarol.

== Career ==
=== Volos ===
On 4 July 2021, Greek Super League side Volos announced him as their new transfer.

=== Bellinzona ===
On 27 August 2022, Romero joined Bellinzona in Switzerland.

=== Nacional ===
In July 2023, Romero returned to Uruguay and joined Nacional.

=== Farense ===
On 29 July 2025, Romero signed with Farense in Portugal.
