= Diego Vicente =

Uruguayan footballer (born 1998)

Personal information
- Full name: Diego Sebastián Vicente Pereyra
- Date of birth: 19 July 1998 (age 28)
- Place of birth: Montevideo, Uruguay
- Height: 1.84 m (6 ft 0 in)
- Position: Central midfielder

Team information
- Current team: Fénix
- Number: 10

Youth career
- 2010–2015: River Plate

Senior career*
Years	Team	Apps	(Gls)
2015–2023	River Plate	44	(1)
2021–2023	→ Danubio (loan)	36	(4)
2023–	Fénix	4	(0)
- * Club domestic league appearances and goals as of 5 May 2024

Diego Sebastián Vicente Pereyra (born 19 July 1998) is a Uruguayan professional footballer who plays as a central midfielder for Fénix in the Uruguayan Primera División.

== Club career ==
Vicente started his career playing with River Plate. He made his professional debut during the 2015/16 season.
