= Ronaldo Conceição =

Brazilian footballer (born 1987)

Personal information
- Full name: Ronaldo Conceição Silveira
- Date of birth: 3 April 1987 (age 39)
- Place of birth: Capão da Canoa, Brazil
- Height: 1.91 m (6 ft 3 in)
- Position: Centre back

Youth career
- 2001–2005: CFZ
- 2005: Internacional

Senior career*
Years	Team	Apps	(Gls)
2005–2006	RS Futebol	0	(0)
2006	São Caetano	0	(0)
2006	Porto Alegre	0	(0)
2006–2008	Esportivo	6	(0)
2008	Cerâmica	0	(0)
2008	Nacional de Montevideo	0	(0)
2008–2010	River Plate Montevideo	22	(2)
2010–2013	Internacional	2	(0)
2012	→ Náutico (loan)	2	(0)
2013	→ São José (loan)	5	(0)
2013	→ Caxias (loan)	0	(0)
2014–2015	El Tanque Sisley	6	(2)
2015–2016	River Plate Montevideo	15	(3)
2016	Atlético Mineiro	4	(0)
2017	Peñarol	1	(0)
2018–2019	Real Sport Club		
2019	Fénix	5	(0)
- * Club domestic league appearances and goals as of 21:43, 1 May 2020 (UTC)

Ronaldo Conceição Silveira (born 3 April 1987), usually known as Ronaldo or Ronaldo Conceição, is a Brazilian football defender.

== Biography ==
Born in Capão da Canoa, Rio Grande do Sul, Ronaldo started his career with CFZ before moved back to Rio Grande do Sul. He graduated from Grêmio and turned to professional at RS Futebol Clube. After played 6 matches at 2007 Campeonato Brasileiro Série C he left for Nacional de Montevideo and then signed by River Plate de Montevideo.
