= Kevin Ramírez (footballer, born 1994) =

Uruguayan footballer

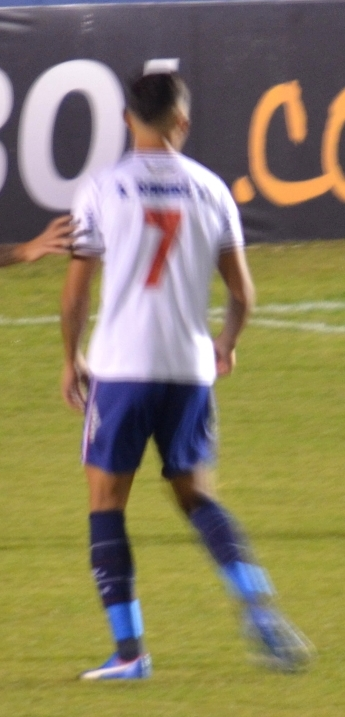
- Kevin Ramírez playing for Nacional Montevideo in 2016

Personal information
- Full name: Kevin Federik Ramírez Dutra
- Date of birth: 1 April 1994 (age 32)
- Place of birth: Rivera, Uruguay
- Height: 1.80 m (5 ft 11 in)
- Position: Winger

Team information
- Current team: Atlético-GO

Youth career
- Sarandí Universitario
- 2013: Montevideo Wanderers

Senior career*
| Years | Team | Apps | (Gls) |
| 2014–2015 | Montevideo Wanderers | 35 | (9) |
| 2015 | → Miramar Misiones (loan) | 9 | (6) |
| 2016–2019 | Nacional Montevideo | 56 | (11) |
| 2018 | → América de Cali (loan) | 6 | (1) |
| 2018 | → Tigre (loan) | 7 | (0) |
| 2019–2020 | Atlante | 18 | (1) |
| 2020–2021 | Querétaro | 48 | (6) |
| 2022–2023 | Puebla | 11 | (0) |
| 2023 | Defensor Sporting | 12 | (2) |
| 2024 | Rentistas | 29 | (10) |
| 2025 | Amazonas | 29 | (10) |
| 2026 | Atlético-GO | 00 | (00) |
- * Club domestic league appearances and goals as of 18 December 2025

Kevin Federik Ramírez Dutra (born 1 April 1994) is a Uruguayan professional footballer who plays as a winger for Brazilian club Atlético-GO.

== Career ==
Ramírez started his career with Montevideo Wanderers. He made his professional debut on 8 February 2014 during a Uruguayan Primera División fixture with Liverpool, which was one of ten appearances during 2013–14. In 2014–15, Ramírez featured another ten times but also scored his first senior goal; netting the club's second goal of a 2–3 loss to Racing Club. Midway through 2014–15, Ramírez was loaned to Miramar Misiones of the Uruguayan Segunda División. He scored six goals for them, including a double netted over Progreso on 31 March 2015, in nine appearances as Miramar Misiones finished mid-table.

On 9 January 2016, Ramírez joined Uruguayan Primera División side Nacional; having spent the previous six months back with Montevideo Wanderers. In his first three seasons with Nacional, Ramírez scored nine goals in sixty-four encounters in all competitions; during which time they won the 2016 Uruguayan Primera División. January 2018 saw Ramírez join Categoría Primera A's América de Cali on loan. Six months later, Tigre of the Argentine Primera División loaned Ramírez. His first appearance came in a Copa Argentina tie with Guillermo Brown in July. Despite joining for a year, he ended his loan in December.

On 11 August 2019 Mexican club Atlante FC announced, that they had signed Ramírez.

== Career statistics ==
As of 25 December 2018

Club statistics
| Club | Season | League | | | National Cup (Note: Includes the Copa Colombia and Copa Argentina) | | League Cup | | Continental (Note: Includes the Copa Libertadores and Copa Sudamericana) | | Other | | Total | |
| Club | Season | Division | Apps | Goals | Apps | Goals | Apps | Goals | Apps | Goals | Apps | Goals | Apps | Goals |
|---|---|---|---|---|---|---|---|---|---|---|---|---|---|---|
| Montevideo Wanderers | 2013–14 | Uruguayan Primera División | 8 | 0 | — | | — | | 0 | 0 | 2 (Note: Two appearances in the 2013–14 Uruguayan Primera División play-offs) | 0 | 10 | 0 |
| Montevideo Wanderers | 2014–15 | Uruguayan Primera División | 10 | 1 | — | | — | | 0 | 0 | 0 | 0 | 10 | 1 |
| Montevideo Wanderers | 2015–16 | Uruguayan Primera División | 15 | 8 | — | | — | | — | | 0 | 0 | 15 | 8 |
| Montevideo Wanderers | Total | | 33 | 9 | — | | — | | 0 | 0 | 2 | 0 | 35 | 9 |
| Miramar Misiones (loan) | 2014–15 | Segunda División | 9 | 6 | — | | — | | — | | 0 | 0 | 9 | 6 |
| Nacional | 2015–16 | Uruguayan Primera División | 8 | 2 | — | | — | | 9 (Note: Nine appearances in the 2016 Copa Libertadores) | 1 (Note: One goal in the 2016 Copa Libertadores) | 0 | 0 | 17 | 3 |
| Nacional | 2016 | Uruguayan Primera División | 12 | 4 | — | | — | | — | | 0 | 0 | 12 | 4 |
| Nacional | 2017 | Uruguayan Primera División | 27 | 1 | — | | — | | 8 (Note: Eight appearances in the 2017 Copa Libertadores) | 1 (Note: One goal in the 2017 Copa Libertadores) | 0 | 0 | 35 | 2 |
| Nacional | 2018 | Uruguayan Primera División | 0 | 0 | — | | — | | 0 | 0 | 0 | 0 | 0 | 0 |
| Nacional | 2019 | Uruguayan Primera División | 0 | 0 | — | | — | | 0 | 0 | 0 | 0 | 0 | 0 |
| Nacional | Total | | 47 | 7 | — | | — | | 17 | 2 | 0 | 0 | 64 | 9 |
| América de Cali (loan) | 2018 | Categoría Primera A | 6 | 1 | 0 | 0 | — | | 2 (Note: Two appearances in the 2018 Copa Sudamericana) | 0 | 0 | 0 | 8 | 1 |
| Tigre (loan) | 2018–19 | Argentine Primera División | 7 | 0 | 2 | 0 | — | | — | | 0 | 0 | 9 | 0 |
| Career total | | | 102 | 23 | 2 | 0 | — | | 19 | 2 | 2 | 0 | 127 | 25 |

== Honours ==
Nacional

- Uruguayan Primera División: 2016
