= Mathías Rodríguez =

Uruguayan footballer (born 1997)

Personal information
- Full name: Mathías Fernando Rodríguez Leites
- Date of birth: 20 June 1997 (age 29)
- Place of birth: Rosario, Uruguay
- Height: 1.71 m (5 ft 7 in)
- Position: Defender

Team information
- Current team: Miramar Misiones
- Number: 17

Youth career
- –2016: Peñarol
- 2015–2016: → Real Madrid (loan)

Senior career*
Years	Team	Apps	(Gls)
2016–2017	Peñarol	11	(0)
2018	Cerro Largo	13	(1)
2022–	Miramar Misiones	49	(2)
- * Club domestic league appearances and goals as of 17 February 2024

Mathías Fernando Rodríguez Leites (born 20 June 1997) is a Uruguayan footballer who plays as a defender for Miramar Misiones.

== Career ==
In 2015, Rodríguez was sent on loan to the youth academy of Spanish La Liga side Real Madrid. Rodríguez started his career with Peñarol in the Uruguayan top flight, where he made 11 league appearances. On 4 September 2016, Rodríguez debuted for Peñarol during a 2–0 win over Fénix.

Before the 2018 season, he signed for Uruguayan second tier club Cerro Largo. Before the 2022 season, he signed for Miramar Misiones in the Uruguayan third tier.

== Career statistics ==
As of 17 February 2024.

Club statistics
Club	Division	League			Cup		Continental		Total	
Club	Division	Season	Apps	Goals	Apps	Goals	Apps	Goals	Apps	Goals
Peñarol	Primera División	2016	11	0	—		-	-	11	0
Cerro Largo	Segunda División	2018	13	1	—		—		13	1
La Luz	Primera División Amateur	2019	9	0	—		—		9	0
Miramar Misiones	Segunda División	2022	25	0	1	0	—		26	0
Miramar Misiones	Segunda División	2023	23	2	2	0	—		25	2
Miramar Misiones	Segunda División	2024	1	0	-	-	—		1	0
Miramar Misiones	Total		49	2	3	0	0	0	52	2
Career total			82	3	3	0	0	0	85	3
