= Esteban Mascareña =

Uruguayan footballer (born 1995)

Personal information
- Full name: Esteban Damián Mascareña Sánchez
- Date of birth: 12 July 1995 (age 31)
- Place of birth: Montevideo, Uruguay
- Height: 1.88 m (6 ft 2 in)
- Position: Centre-back

Team information
- Current team: Sant Jordi
- Number: 24

Youth career
- 2010–2012: Bella Vista
- 2012–2015: Boston River
- 2015–2016: River Plate

Senior career*
Years	Team	Apps	(Gls)
2016–2018	River Plate	4	(0)
2017	→ Villa Española (loan)	13	(0)
2018–2020	Sant Jordi	38	(4)
2021–2021	Samtredia	8	(0)
2021–2022	Engordany		
2022	Ciudad Nueva Santa Cruz		
2022–2023	Engordany		
2023–2024	As Pontes	38	(1)
2024–	Sant Jordi	20	(0)
- * Club domestic league appearances and goals as of 16 May 2021

Esteban Damián Mascareña Sánchez (born 12 July 1995) is a Uruguayan professional footballer who plays as a centre-back.

== Club career ==
Mascareña started his career playing with River Plate. He made his professional debut during the 2015–16 season.
