= Christian Serrón =

Uruguayan footballer (born 1994)

Personal information
- Full name: Christian Ariel Serrón Acosta
- Date of birth: November 17, 1994 (age 31)
- Place of birth: Montevideo, Uruguay
- Height: 1.78 m (5 ft 10 in)
- Position: Attacking midfielder

Team information
- Current team: Fuerza Amarilla

Youth career
- 2008–2014: River Plate

Senior career*
Years	Team	Apps	(Gls)
2014–2015	River Plate	0	(0)
2015–2017	Rampla Juniors	16	(5)
2018–	Fuerza Amarilla	?	(?)
- * Club domestic league appearances and goals as of 18 January 2019

Christian Ariel Serrón Acosta (born November 17, 1994 ) is a Uruguayan professional footballer who plays as an attacking midfielder for Fuerza Amarilla.

== Club career ==
Vicente started his career playing with Rampla Juniors. He made his professional debut during the 2014/15 season.

Serrón signe for Fuerza Amarilla in January 2018.
