= Iván Silva (footballer, born 1993) =

Uruguayan footballer

Personal information
- Full name: Iván Rodrigo Silva Olivera
- Date of birth: October 23, 1993 (age 33)
- Place of birth: Montevideo, Uruguay
- Height: 1.82 m (5 ft 11 1/2 in)
- Position: Centre back

Team information
- Current team: Atlético Porteño (on loan from River Plate)

Youth career
- 2010–2011: Tacuarembó

Senior career*
Years	Team	Apps	(Gls)
2011–2015	Tacuarembó	24	(1)
2015–	River Plate	45	(1)
2019–	→ Atlético Porteño (loan)		
- * Club domestic league appearances and goals as of 22:05, 17 December 2019 (UTC)

Iván Rodrigo Silva Olivera (born October 23, 1993) is a Uruguayan footballer who plays for Ecuadorian side Club Atlético Porteño on loan from Uruguayan Primera División club River Plate.

== Career ==
Silva began his career in 2011 with Tacuarembó FC, where he played for four seasons. Since April 2015 he plays for River Plate as a central defender.
