= Cristian González (footballer, born 1976) =

Uruguayan footballer (born 1976)

Personal information
- Full name: Cristian Mario González Aidinovich
- Date of birth: 19 December 1976 (age 49)
- Place of birth: Atlántida, Uruguay
- Height: 1.82 m (6 ft 0 in)
- Position: Centre back

Senior career*
Years	Team	Apps	(Gls)
1998–1999	Liverpool	46	(0)
2000–2004	Defensor Sporting	91	(2)
2001	→ Deportivo Maldonado (loan)	1	(0)
2003–2004	→ Las Palmas (loan)	26	(2)
2004–2005	Peñarol	26	(0)
2005–2006	Maccabi Tel Aviv	12	(0)
2006–2010	Ironi Ashdod	112	(2)
2007	→ Defensor Sporting (loan)	14	(0)
2010–2011	Beitar Jerusalem	26	(2)
2011–2016	River Plate	121	(3)
2016–2017	Plaza Colonia	12	(1)
2017	Deportivo Maldonado	16	(0)
2018	El Tanque Sisley	0	(0)
2018	Sud América	16	(2)

International career
2002–2004	Uruguay	9	(0)
- * Club domestic league appearances and goals

Cristian Mario González Aidinovich (born 19 December 1976) is a Uruguayan retired football player.

== Career statistics ==
=== International ===
Appearances and goals by national team and year
National team	Year	Apps	Goals
Uruguay	2002	1	0
Uruguay	2003	7	0
Uruguay	2004	1	0
Total		9	0
