= Santiago Carrera =

Uruguayan footballer (born 1994)

Personal information
- Full name: Santiago Nicolás Carrera Sanguinetti
- Date of birth: 5 March 1994 (age 32)
- Place of birth: Montevideo, Uruguay
- Height: 1.88 m (6 ft 2 in)
- Position: Centre back

Youth career
- –2012: River Plate

Senior career*
Years	Team	Apps	(Gls)
2012–2014	River Plate	20	(3)
2014–2017	Sud América	61	(5)
2015	→ Huracán (loan)	2	(0)
2015–2016	→ Liverpool (loan)	8	(0)
2017–2019	Defensor Sporting	32	(3)
2019–2020	Bisceglie	1	(0)
2020	Deportivo Maldonado	10	(0)
2020	Danubio	16	(0)
2022	Sud América	13	(1)
2022	FAS	2	(0)
2023	La Luz	15	(0)
2024	Guillermo Brown	5	(0)

International career
2011	Uruguay U-17	2	(0)
- * Club domestic league appearances and goals as of 01:34, 26 December 2020 (UTC)

Santiago Nicolás Carrera Sanguinetti (born 5 March 1994), known as Santiago Carrera, is an Uruguayan footballer.

== Club career ==
On 2 September 2019, he signed with Italian club Bisceglie.
