= Claudio Herrera (footballer) =

Uruguayan footballer (born 1988)

Personal information
- Full name: Claudio Herrera Casanova
- Date of birth: February 11, 1988 (age 38)
- Place of birth: Montevideo, Uruguay
- Height: 1.80 m (5 ft 11 in)
- Position: Defender

Team information
- Current team: River Plate
- Number: 22

Youth career
- Cagliari

Senior career*
Years	Team	Apps	(Gls)
2007–2008	Cagliari	0	(0)
2008–2009	Messina	0	(0)
2009–2021	River Plate	171	(3)
- * Club domestic league appearances and goals

Claudio Herrera Casanova (born February 11, 1988) is a Uruguayan footballer who plays as a defender for River Plate.

== Career ==
Herrera began his career in 2010 with River Plate Montevideo, where he played for five seasons, until now.
