= César Taján =

Colombian footballer (born 1991)

César Tajan
Personal information
- Full name: César Tajan Jiménez
- Date of birth: June 25, 1991 (age 35)
- Place of birth: Cartagena, Colombia
- Height: 1.72 m (5 ft 8 in)
- Position: Forward

Team information
- Current team: Deportivo LSM

Youth career
- Once Caldas

Senior career*
| Years | Team | Apps | (Gls) |
| 2011–2012 | Once Caldas | 10 | (3) |
| 2013–2014 | Real Cartagena | 4 | (1) |
| 2014–2015 | Albion | 12 | (8) |
| 2015–2016 | Central Español | 16 | (2) |
| 2016–2017 | River Plate | 18 | (1) |
| 2018 | Fénix | 11 | (0) |
| 2019– | Albion | 5 | (0) |
- * Club domestic league appearances and goals as of 12:41, 5 June 2019 (UTC)

César Tajan Jiménez (born 25 June 1991) is a Colombian footballer who plays for Deportivo LSM. He was born in Cartagena.
