= Danilo Suárez =

Uruguayan footballer (born 1989)

Personal information
- Full name: Danilo Nicolás Suárez García
- Date of birth: March 7, 1989 (age 37)
- Place of birth: Artigas, Uruguay
- Height: 1.83 m (6 ft 0 in)
- Position: Goalkeeper

Team information
- Current team: Deportivo Marquense

Senior career*
| Years | Team | Apps | (Gls) |
| 2008–2011 | River Plate B | 0 | (0) |
| 2011–2015 | River Plate | 0 | (0) |
| 2014–2015 | → Tacuarembó (loan) | 1 | (0) |
| 2015 | → Miramar Misiones (loan) | 5 | (0) |
| 2015–2017 | Miramar Misiones | 33 | (0) |
| 2017 | Huracán | 21 | (0) |
| 2018– | Deportivo Marquense | 22 | (0) |
- * Club domestic league appearances and goals as of 17:50, 29 September 2019 (UTC)

Danilo Nicolás Suárez García (born March 7, 1989 ) is a Uruguayan professional footballer who plays as a goalkeeper for Deportivo Marquense in the Liga Nacional de Fútbol de Guatemala.

== Club career ==
Suarez started his career playing with Tacuarembó. He made his professional debut during the 2014/15 season.
