= Diego Rodríguez (footballer, born 1986) =

Uruguayan footballer

Personal information
- Full name: Diego Manuel Rodríguez Da Luz
- Date of birth: 8 August 1986 (age 40)
- Place of birth: Montevideo, Uruguay
- Height: 1.76 m (5 ft 9 in)
- Position: Left back

Youth career
- Peñarol

Senior career*
Years	Team	Apps	(Gls)
2003–2008	Peñarol	79	(3)
2008–2009	Bologna	7	(0)
2009–2010	Huracán	38	(3)
2011–2013	Defensor Sporting	45	(1)
2013–2018	River Plate	94	(3)
2019	Juventud	26	(0)
2020	Atenas	0	(0)
- * Club domestic league appearances and goals as of 10:03, 20 March 2021 (UTC)

Diego Manuel Rodríguez da Luz (born 8 August 1986 in Montevideo) is a Uruguayan footballer.

== Career ==
In 2008, he was transferred to Bologna to play in the Italian Serie A where he didn't play much. Then he went to Argentina to play for Huracán – a team in that country.
