= Lucas Ruiz =

Uruguayan footballer (born 1996)

Personal information
- Full name: Lucas Ruiz Alonso
- Date of birth: 7 March 1996 (age 30)
- Place of birth: Las Piedras, Uruguay
- Height: 1.84 m (6 ft 1/2 in)
- Position: Defender

Team information
- Current team: Tivoli

Youth career
- –2014: River Plate

Senior career*
Years	Team	Apps	(Gls)
2014–2017	River Plate	13	(0)
2018–2021	Albion		
2021	Villa Teresa	9	(0)
2021–2022	San Marco Servigliano		
2022	Libertas	12	(0)
2022–2023	Castelfidardo		
2023	Sammaurese	9	(1)
2023–	Tivoli	5	(0)
- * Club domestic league appearances and goals as of 6 January 2024

Lucas Ruiz Alonso (born 7 March 1996) is a Uruguayan footballer who plays for Italian Serie D club Tivoli.

== Career ==
Ruiz began his career in 2014 with River Plate Montevideo.
