= Bruno Montelongo =

Uruguayan footballer (born 1987)

Personal information
- Full name: Bruno Montelongo Gesta
- Date of birth: 12 September 1987 (age 39)
- Place of birth: Montevideo, Uruguay
- Height: 1.82 m (6 ft 0 in)
- Position: Right-back

Youth career
- River Plate

Senior career*
Years	Team	Apps	(Gls)
2007–2010	River Plate	57	(5)
2010–2011	→ Milan (loan)	0	(0)
2011	→ Bologna (loan)	0	(0)
2011	→ Peñarol (loan)	3	(0)
2012–2017	River Plate	88	(11)
2017	Extremadura	13	(1)
2018	Córdoba	0	(0)
2018	Xerez	9	(0)
2019	Fenix	4	(0)
2020–2021	Rampla Juniors	7	(0)

International career
2007	Uruguay U20	3	(0)
- * Club domestic league appearances and goals as of 18:13, 13 February 2022 (UTC)

Bruno Montelongo Gesta (born 12 September 1987) is a Uruguayan professional footballer who plays as a right-back.

== Club career ==
Montelongo started his professional career with River Plate Montevideo, playing with their first team since 2007. In August 2010, he was loaned out to Italian Serie A club Milan, while River president, Juan José Tudurí has been reported saying that Milan will decide within five or six months whether to fully purchase the player or not.

On 26 January 2011, Bologna announced that it had acquired Montelongo's playing rights on loan from Milan, a sub-loan.

Montelongo joined Spanish club Xerez CD on 11 September 2018. Exactly 3 months later the club announced, that they had terminated the players contract because he had received an offer from his home country, that he had accepted. The club turned out to be Centro Atlético Fénix, which he signed for on 8 January 2019. He left Fénix again at the end of the year.

Montelongo remained without a club until the end of July 2020, when he signed with Rampla Juniors for the rest of the year. In December 2020, Montelongo tore his anterior cruciate ligament for the third time in his career (first time in 2008 and second time in 2011). However, he was offered to stay at the club and extended his contract.

== International career ==
Montelongo has played internationally for Uruguay U-20, taking part in the 2007 FIFA U-20 World Cup.

== Statistics ==
As of 26 January 2011.

Team	Season	Domestic League		Domestic Cup		Continental Competition^{1}		Other Tournaments^{2}		Total	
Team	Season	Apps	Goals	Apps	Goals	Apps	Goals	Apps	Goals	Apps	Goals
River Plate Montevideo	2006–07	11	0	–		–		–		11	0
River Plate Montevideo	2007–08	16	2	–		–		–		16	2
River Plate Montevideo	2008–09	6	0	–		2	0	–		8	0
River Plate Montevideo	2009–10	28	6	–		2	1	–		30	7
River Plate Montevideo	2010	0	0	–		2	0	–		2	0
River Plate Montevideo	Total	61	8	0	0	6	1	0	0	67	9
Milan	2010–11	0	0	0	0	0	0	–		0	0
Bologna	2011	0	0	0	0	–		–		0	0
Career Total		61	8	0	0	6	1	0	0	67	9

^{1}Continental competitions include Copa Sudamericana and the UEFA Champions League.
^{2}Other tournaments include none to date.

== Personal life ==
Though born in Uruguay, Montelongo is of Italian descent and therefore also holds an Italian passport.
