= Matías Jones =

Uruguayan footballer (born 1991)

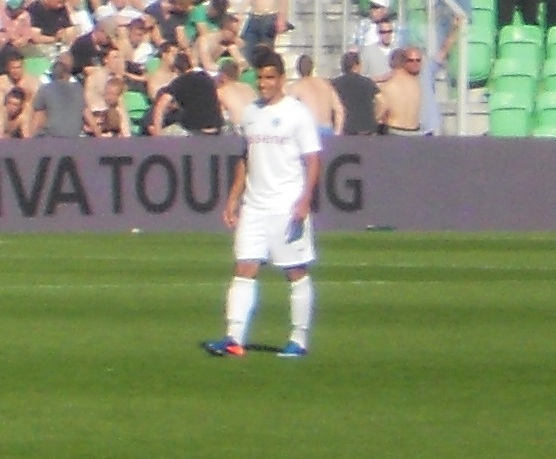

Personal information
- Full name: Matías Martín Jones Mourigian
- Date of birth: 1 July 1991 (age 35)
- Place of birth: Montevideo, Uruguay
- Height: 1.74 m (5 ft 9 in)
- Position: Attacking midfielder

Team information
- Current team: Hoogeveen
- Number: 17

Youth career
- –2009: Danubio

Senior career*
Years	Team	Apps	(Gls)
2009–2011	Danubio	11	(1)
2011–2013	Groningen	12	(1)
2013	→ Emmen (loan)	9	(0)
2013–2014	Defensor Sporting	10	(2)
2014–2015	La Equidad	7	(0)
2015–2016	San Martín (San Juan)	1	(0)
2016–2019	River Plate	76	(13)
2019	Cambuur	9	(0)
2019–2021	Danubio	20	(3)
2021	Central Español	22	(0)
2022–2025	HHC Hardenberg	73	(6)
2025–	Hoogeveen	0	(0)

International career
2010–2011	Uruguay U20	5	(0)
- * Club domestic league appearances and goals as of 02:05, 11 January 2026 (UTC)

Matías Martín Jones Mourigian (born 1 July 1991) is a Uruguayan footballer who plays as a midfielder for Derde Divisie club Hoogeveen.

== Club career ==
Jones started his career playing with Danubio FC in the Uruguayan Top Division. He made his debut on 19 September 2009, in a 2–2 draw against River Plate.

In mid 2010 he was transferred to Eredivisie side FC Groningen. He scored his first goal in the Netherlands on 27 April 2012 against De Graafschap. He was never able to be part of the first eleven and therefore was sent on loan to FC Emmen.

In August 2013, both Groningen and Jones decided to dissolve his contract. Jones returned to Uruguay and signed a two-year contract with Defensor.

In August 2014, he went to Bogotá to play for La Equidad. In October of that year he broke his shoulder with muscles and for this injury surgery was needed and he was out for 3,5 months.

After playing a half year for La Equidad he went in January 2015 to play for San Martín (San Juan) in San Juan, Argentina, again an accident happened while training and Matias broke in May 2015 his leg and needed undergoing surgery.

In January 2016, Jones returned again to his country, but now to play for River Plate.

In February 2019, he returned to the Netherlands to play for Eerste Divisie side SC Cambuur. After playing for Uruguayan clubs Danubio and Central Español between 2019 and 2021, Jones again returned to the Netherlands, where he signed for amateur club HHC Hardenberg in the Tweede Divisie.

== International career ==
He has been capped by the Uruguay national under-20 football team for the 2011 South American Youth Championship and for the pre-squad for the 2011 FIFA U-20 World Cup.

== Personal life ==
Jones lives with his Dutch girlfriend Annelot and two children, Dante and Dorian, in Roden, Drenthe, Netherlands.
