= Federico Pintos =

Uruguayan footballer (born 1992)

Personal information
- Full name: César Federico Pintos Álvarez
- Date of birth: 17 November 1992 (age 33)
- Place of birth: Montevideo, Uruguay
- Height: 1.80 m (5 ft 11 in)
- Position: Attacking midfielder

Team information
- Current team: Salto FC

Youth career
- Defensor Sporting

Senior career*
Years	Team	Apps	(Gls)
2011–2013	Defensor Sporting	34	(5)
2013–2014	Belgrano	0	(0)
2014–2015	Godoy Cruz	0	(0)
2015–2016	River Plate	14	(0)
2016–2017	Boston River	9	(0)
2017–2018	Rentistas	24	(6)
2018	Jaguares de Córdoba	4	(0)
2019	Le Touquet	6	(0)
2020	Rocha	4	(0)
2021	Cerro	1	(0)
2022–	Salto FC		

International career
2012	Uruguay U22	?	(?)
- * Club domestic league appearances and goals

César Federico Pintos Álvarez (born 17 November 1992 in Montevideo) is an Uruguayan footballer who plays as an attacking midfielder for Salto FC in Uruguay.

== Club career ==
Pintos started his career playing with Defensor Sporting. He made his professional debut during the 2011/12 season. Then he moved to Argentinian side Belgrano for 2014 season.
