= Nicola Pérez =

Uruguayan footballer (born 1990)

Personal information
- Full name: Alison Nicola Pérez Barone
- Date of birth: 5 February 1990 (age 36)
- Place of birth: Isidoro Noblía, Uruguay
- Height: 1.82 m (6 ft 0 in)
- Position: Goalkeeper

Team information
- Current team: Ñublense
- Number: 1

Youth career
- 2007–2009: Nacional

Senior career*
Years	Team	Apps	(Gls)
2009–2010	Nacional	0	(0)
2010–2014	El Tanque Sisley	70	(0)
2014–2018	River Plate	109	(0)
2019–2021	Progreso	58	(0)
2021–	Ñublense	144	(0)
- * Club domestic league appearances and goals as of 16 August 2025

Alison Nicola Pérez Barone (born 5 February 1990), better known as Nicola Pérez, is a Uruguayan footballer who plays as a goalkeeper for Chilean Primera División club Ñublense.

== Club career ==
Pérez started his career playing with El Tanque Sisley. He made his professional debut during the 2010/11 season.
