= Estadio Saroldi =

Parque Federico Omar Saroldi
- El Saroldi
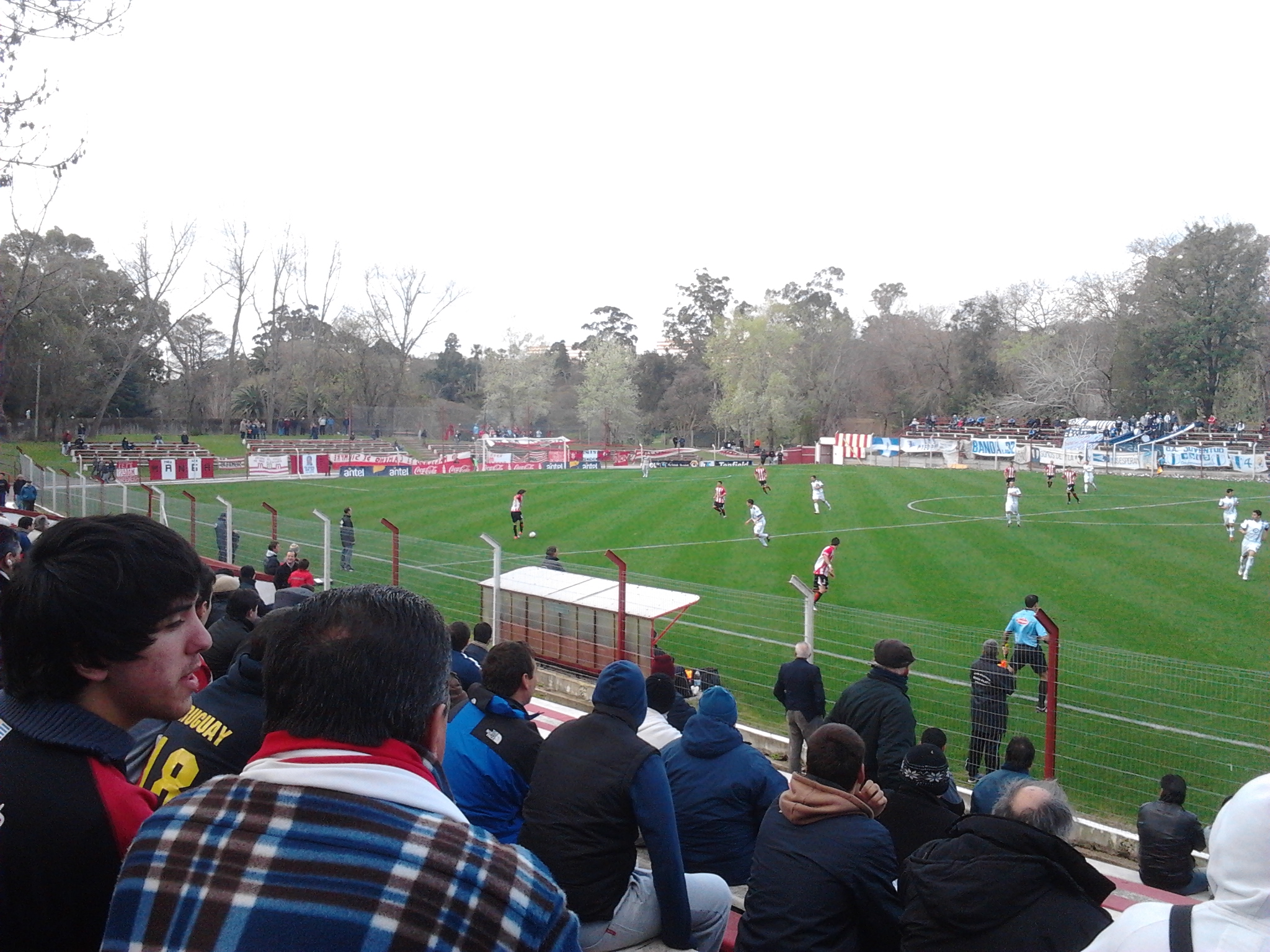
- Saroldi stadium in August 2012
- Interactive map of Parque Federico Omar Saroldi
- Full name: Estadio Parque Federico Omar Saroldi
- Location: Montevideo, Uruguay
- Coordinates: 34.862135°S 56.201640°W
- Owner: Club Atlético River Plate
- Capacity: 6,000 (expected 10.000)
- Surface: Grass
- Field size: 105 x 68 m

Construction
- Built: 1926
- Opened: 1926
- Renovated: 1993, 2008

Tenants
- Club Atlético Olimpia (1926-1932); Club Atlético River Plate (1932- )

Estadio Saroldi (full name: Parque Federico Omar Saroldi) is a multi-use stadium in Montevideo, Uruguay. It is currently used mostly for football matches. The stadium holds 6,000 all seated.

Originally, the stadium was named as "Olimpia Park", as it served as home to Olimpia. After River Plate's goalkeeper Federico Omar Saroldi was fatally injured, during a match between his team and Central Español, the stadium starting to hold goalkeeper's name.

== Ephemeris ==
- 1990: CA Progreso used Estadio Saroldi, as it home stadium, for 1990 Copa Libertadores.
- 1996 and 1998: River Plate played its Copa Conmebol matches against Porongos, Huracán Buceo and Rosario Central.
- 2003: The stadium was also used by the Teros for 2003 Rugby World Cup's qualification matches during 2002
