= Christian Pérez (Uruguayan footballer) =

Uruguayan footballer (born 1990)

Personal information
- Full name: Christian Elizardo Pérez Gómez
- Date of birth: 18 May 1990 (age 36)
- Place of birth: Montevideo, Uruguay
- Height: 1.73 m (5 ft 8 in)
- Position: Central midfielder

Youth career
- –2008: Defensor

Senior career*
Years	Team	Apps	(Gls)
2008–2010	Defensor B	0	(0)
2010–2014	Defensor	0	(0)
2012–2013	→ Central Español (loan)	1	(0)
2014–2015	Torque	25	(1)
2015–2016	River Plate Montevideo	1	(0)
2016	→ Rampla Juniors (loan)	10	(0)
2016	Progreso	9	(0)
2017	Cerrito	20	(0)
2019	Gafanha	9	(0)
2019	GC Figueirense	11	(0)
2020	Miramar Misiones		
2021	Delfines del Este	4	(0)
2022	Colón		
- * Club domestic league appearances and goals

Christian Elizardo Pérez Gómez (born 18 March 1990) is a Uruguayan former footballer who played as a central midfielder.

== Career ==
Pérez began his career in 2013 with Central Español, where he played for one season. Then, he moved to Torque and played there for two seasons in Uruguayan Segunda División. Since June 2015, Pérez plays for River Plate.
