= 2019 River Plate Montevideo season =

River Plate
2019 season
- President: Willie Tucci
- Head coach: (Uruguay) Jorge Giordano (until June 9) (Uruguay) Jorge Fossati (since June 12)
- Stadium: Estadio Saroldi
- Uruguayan Primera División: 7th
- Top goalscorer: League: (Uruguay) Matías Alonso (Uruguay) Matías Arezo (Uruguay) Juan Manuel Olivera (Uruguay) Luis Urruti (6 goals each); All: (Uruguay) Matías Alonso (Uruguay) Matías Arezo (Uruguay) Juan Manuel Olivera (Uruguay) Luis Urruti (6 goals each)
Home colours	Away colours	Third colours

River Plate took part in the Uruguayan Primera División, qualifying for 2020 Copa Sudamericana as Uruguay-3rd. At the same time, it has participated in 2019 Copa Sudamericana.

== Transfer Window ==
=== Summer 2019 ===
==== In ====
Position	Nationality	Name	Age	From	Fee	Transfer Window	Ref.
MF	(Uruguay)	Sebastián Píriz	28	(Greece) Panionios	Free Agent	Summer	tenfield.com.uy
DF	(Uruguay)	Marcos Montiel	23	Villa Teresa	Free Agent	Summer	tenfield.com.uy
DF	(Uruguay)	Sebastián Gorga	24	Wanderers	Free Agent	Summer	tenfield.com.uy
DF	(Argentina)	Luis Olivera	20	(Argentina) River Plate	Exchange	Summer	lapaginamillonaria.com
GK	(Uruguay)	Francisco Tinaglini	20	Oriental	Return from loan	Summer	tenfield.com.uy
DF	(Uruguay)	Santiago Pérez	20	Albion	Return from loan	Summer	tenfield.com.uy

==== Out ====
Position	Nationality	Name	Age	To	Fee	Transfer Window	Ref.
FW	(Uruguay)	Facundo Boné	23	(Brazil) Vila Nova	Loan	Summer	sagresonline.com.br
GK	(Uruguay)	Nicola Pérez	29	Progreso	Free Agent	Summer	tenfield.com.uy
DF	(Uruguay)	Williams Martínez	36	-	Free Agent	Summer	elobservador.com.uy
DF	(Uruguay)	Emiliano García	29	(Ecuador) América	Free Agent	Summer	tenfield.com.uy
MF	(Uruguay)	Pablo González	23	-	Free Agent	Summer	tenfield.com.uy
MF	(Uruguay)	Matías Jones	23	(Netherlands) SC Cambuur	Free Agent	Summer	www.lc.nl
DF	(Uruguay)	Deivis Barone	39	Tacuarembó	Free Agent	Summer	tenfield.com.uy
MF	(Uruguay)	Matías Ebre	21	-	Free Agent	Summer	tenfield.com.uy
FW	(Uruguay)	Ezequiel Peña	21	-	Free Agent	Summer	tenfield.com.uy
DF	(Uruguay)	Diego Rodríguez	32	Juventud	Free Agent	Summer	tenfield.com.uy

=== Winter 2019 ===
==== In ====
Position	Nationality	Name	Age	From	Fee	Transfer Window	Ref.
DF	(Uruguay)	Gonzalo Viera	32	(Qatar) Al-Rayyan SC	Free agent	Winter	tenfield.com.uy
DF	(Uruguay)	Horacio Salaberry	32	(Ecuador) L.D.U. Quito	Free agent	Winter	tenfield.com.uy
MF	(Uruguay)	Joaquín Piqueréz	20	Defensor Sporting	Free agent	Winter	tenfield.com.uy
MF	(Uruguay)	Adrián Leites	27	(Guatemala) Coban Imperial	Free agent	Winter	tenfield.com.uy

==== Out ====
Position	Nationality	Name	Age	To	Fee	Transfer Window	Ref.
DF	(Argentina)	Luis Olivera	20	(Argentina) River Plate	Return from loan	Winter	tenfield.com.uy
DF	(Uruguay)	Iván Silva	25	(Ecuador) Atlético Porteño	Free agent	Winter	tenfield.com.uy
FW	(Uruguay)	Mauro Da Luz	24	(Argentina) Colón	Transfer	Winter	tycsports.com

== Squad ==
=== First team squad ===
As of Sep 21, 2019

Note: Flags indicate national team as defined under FIFA eligibility rules; some limited exceptions apply. Players may hold more than one non-FIFA nationality.

No.	Pos.	Nation	Player
1	GK	URU	Gastón Olveira
2	DF	URU	Agustín Ale
4	DF	URU	Horacio Salaberry
5	MF	URU	Facundo Ospitaleche
6	DF	URU	Facundo Silvera
7	DF	URU	Nicolás Rodríguez
8	MF	URU	Maximiliano Calzada
9	FW	URU	Matías Arezo
10	FW	URU	Facundo Vigo
11	FW	URU	Luis Urruti
12	GK	URU	Francisco Tinaglini
13	DF	URU	Gonzalo Viera
14	DF	URU	Sebastián Gorga
15	MF	URU	Juan Pablo Plada
16	MF	URU	Joaquín Piqueréz
18	MF	URU	Diego Vicente

No.	Pos.	Nation	Player
19	FW	URU	Juan Manuel Olivera
20	MF	URU	Sebastián Píriz
21	FW	URU	Cristian Martin
22	DF	URU	Claudio Herrera
23	FW	URU	Matías Alonso
24	DF	URU	Joaquín Fernández
25	GK	URU	Lucas Machado
26	DF	URU	Santiago Pérez
27	DF	URU	Emanuel Hernández
28	MF	URU	José Neris
29	DF	URU	Guzmán Rodríguez
30	DF	URU	Adrián Leites
33	FW	URU	Gabriel Leyes
34	DF	URU	Matías Streccia
35	DF	URU	Marcos Montiel

=== Top scorers ===
Last updated on Dec 6, 2019

Rank	Pos.	No.	Name	Primera División	Torneo Intermedio	Copa Sudamericana	Total
1	FW	9	(Uruguay) Matías Arezo	3	3	0	6
1	FW	11	(Uruguay) Luis Urruti	4	2	0	6
1	FW	19	(Uruguay) Juan Manuel Olivera	6	0	0	6
1	FW	23	(Uruguay) Matías Alonso	6	0	0	6
2	FW	-	(Uruguay) Mauro Da Luz	1	0	2	3
2	FW	16	(Uruguay) Joaquín Piqueréz	1	2	0	3
2	MF	20	(Uruguay) Sebastián Píriz	2	1	0	3
3	DF	7	(Uruguay) Nicolás Rodríguez	2	0	0	2
3	DF	13	(Uruguay) Gonzalo Viera	1	1	0	2
3	MF	28	(Uruguay) José Neris	2	0	0	2
3	MF	30	(Uruguay) Adrián Leites	2	0	0	2
4	DF	6	(Uruguay) Facundo Silvera	1	0	0	1
4	FW	15	(Uruguay) Juan Pablo Plada	1	0	0	1
4	MF	18	(Uruguay) Diego Vicente	1	0	0	1
4	FW	33	(Uruguay) Gabriel Leyes	1	0	0	1
-	Own goals	-	-	0	0	0	0
Total				33	9	2	45

=== Disciplinary record ===
Last updated on Dec 6, 2019

No.	Pos	Nat	Name	Primera División			Torneo Intermedio			Copa Sudamericana			Total		
No.	Pos	Nat	Name	Yellow card	(yellow card) (yellow-red card)	Red card	Yellow card	(yellow card) (yellow-red card)	Red card	Yellow card	(yellow card) (yellow-red card)	Red card	Yellow card	(yellow card) (yellow-red card)	Red card
Goalkeepers
1	GK	(Uruguay)	Gastón Olveira	2	0	0	2	0	0	0	0	0	4	0	0
12	GK	(Uruguay)	Francisco Tinaglini	0	0	0	0	0	1	0	0	0	0	0	1
25	GK	(Uruguay)	Lucas Machado	0	0	0	0	0	0	0	0	0	0	0	0
Defenders
2	DF	(Uruguay)	Agustín Ale	7	0	0	1	0	0	1	0	0	9	0	0
4	DF	(Uruguay)	Horacio Salaberry	3	0	0	0	0	0	0	0	0	3	0	0
6	DF	(Uruguay)	Facundo Silvera	1	0	0	0	0	0	0	0	0	1	0	0
13	DF	(Uruguay)	Gonzalo Viera	3	0	1	4	0	0	0	0	0	7	0	1
14	DF	(Uruguay)	Sebastián Gorga	2	1	0	0	0	0	0	0	0	2	1	0
22	DF	(Uruguay)	Claudio Herrera	2	0	0	1	0	0	1	0	0	4	0	0
24	DF	(Uruguay)	Joaquín Fernández	2	2	0	3	0	0	0	0	0	5	2	0
26	DF	(Uruguay)	Santiago Pérez	5	0	0	1	0	0	0	0	0	6	0	0
27	DF	(Uruguay)	Emanuel Hernández	3	0	0	0	0	0	0	0	0	3	0	0
29	DF	(Uruguay)	Guzmán Rodríguez	1	0	0	0	0	0	0	0	0	1	0	0
34	DF	(Uruguay)	Matías Streccia	0	0	0	0	0	0	0	0	0	0	0	0
Midfielders
5	MF	(Uruguay)	Facundo Ospitaleche	13	0	0	2	0	0	0	0	0	15	0	0
7	MF	(Uruguay)	Nicolás Rodríguez	2	1	0	0	0	0	1	0	0	3	1	0
8	MF	(Uruguay)	Maximiliano Calzada	9	1	0	2	1	0	1	0	0	12	2	0
10	MF	(Uruguay)	Facundo Vigo	0	0	0	0	0	0	0	0	0	0	0	0
15	MF	(Uruguay)	Juan Pablo Plada	4	0	0	1	0	0	1	0	0	6	0	0
16	MF	(Uruguay)	Joaquín Piqueréz	0	0	0	1	0	0	0	0	0	1	0	0
18	MF	(Uruguay)	Diego Vicente	2	0	0	2	0	0	0	0	0	4	0	0
20	MF	(Uruguay)	Sebastián Píriz	11	1	1	1	0	0	1	0	1	13	1	2
28	MF	(Uruguay)	José Neris	1	0	1	0	0	0	0	0	0	1	0	1
30	MF	(Uruguay)	Adrián Leites	0	0	0	1	0	0	0	0	0	1	0	0
Forwards
9	FW	(Uruguay)	Matías Arezo	3	0	0	2	0	0	0	0	0	5	0	0
11	FW	(Uruguay)	Luis Urruti	6	0	0	1	0	1	1	0	0	8	0	1
19	FW	(Uruguay)	Juan Manuel Olivera	3	0	0	1	0	0	0	0	0	4	0	0
21	FW	(Uruguay)	Christian Martín	0	0	0	0	0	0	0	0	0	0	0	0
23	FW	(Uruguay)	Matías Alonso	4	0	0	0	0	0	1	0	0	5	0	0
33	FW	(Uruguay)	Gabriel Leyes	2	0	0	0	0	0	1	0	0	3	0	0
Players transferred out during the season
	DF	(Argentina)	Luis Olivera	1	0	0	0	0	0	1	0	0	2	0	0
	DF	(Uruguay)	Iván Silva	3	0	0	0	0	0	1	0	0	4	0	0
	FW	(Uruguay)	Mauro Da Luz	3	1	0	0	0	0	1	0	0	4	1	0
Total				98	7	3	26	1	2	12	0	1	136	8	6

== Primera División ==
=== Apertura 2019 ===
==== League table ====
Pos	Team	Pld	W	D	L	GF	GA	GD	Pts	Qualification
1	Peñarol	15	9	4	2	27	11	+16	31	Qualification for Championship playoff
2	Fénix	15	8	4	3	36	26	+10	28	
3	Nacional	15	7	6	2	32	17	+15	27	
4	Cerro Largo	15	8	3	4	23	12	+11	27	
5	Danubio	15	8	3	4	22	17	+5	27	
6	Montevideo Wanderers	15	6	5	4	21	22	−1	23	
7	Progreso	15	6	4	5	27	25	+2	22	
8	Liverpool	15	5	5	5	29	29	0	20	
9	Boston River	15	5	5	5	18	22	−4	20	
10	Rampla Juniors	15	5	3	7	16	23	−7	18	
11	Defensor Sporting	15	4	4	7	21	27	−6	16	
12	Racing	15	4	3	8	20	30	−10	15	
13	Juventud	15	4	2	9	21	22	−1	14	
14	Plaza Colonia	15	3	5	7	15	21	−6	14	
15	River Plate	15	3	5	7	14	30	−16	14	
16	Cerro	15	3	3	9	14	23	−9	12	

Source: AUF, Soccerway
Rules for classification: 1) Points, 2) Playoff game, in case two teams are tied for first place.
If there are more than two teams tied in points: 2) Goal difference, 3) Goals for, 4) Head-to-head record, 5) Drawing of lots, 6) Playoff game, in case two teams are still tied for first place.

==== Results by round ====
Round	1	2	3	4	5	6	7	8	9	10	11	12	13	14	15
Ground	A	H	A	H	A	H	A	A	H	A	H	A	H	A	H
Result	D	W	L	D	L	W	L	L	D	L	L	D	W	L	D
Position	8	4	7	8	9	8	10	14	14	15	15	15	13	14	15

A = Away; H = Home; W = Win; D = Draw; L = Loss

==== Matches ====
Win Draw Loss Postponed

February 16, 2019 1	Wanderers	1-1	River Plate	Montevideo
19:30 UTC−3	Macaluso 25'; Morales (yellow card) 81'; Barreto (yellow card) 90'	Report	Alonso 86'; Silva (yellow card) 8'; Ale (yellow card) 44'; Calzada (yellow card) 52'; Píriz (yellow card) 55'; Ospitaleche (yellow card) 88'	Stadium: Viera; Referee: Andrés Cunha

February 23, 2019 2	River Plate	4-1	Racing	Montevideo
17:00 UTC−3	Neris 16' 20'; Leyes 23'; Silvera 89'; Ospitaleche (yellow card) 70'; Urruti (yellow card) 79'; Píriz (yellow card) 87'	Report	Alvite 28' (yellow card) 29'; Lacoste (yellow card) 85'	Stadium: Saroldi; Referee: Daniel Fedorczuk

March 3, 2019 3	Boston River	2-0	River Plate	Montevideo
16:30 UTC−3	Gurri 40' (yellow card) 74'; Pérez 51'; Foliados (yellow card) 68'; Amado (red card) 90+2'	Report	Gorga (yellow card) 49' (yellow-red card) 90+2'; Ale (yellow card) 69'; Leyes (yellow card) 80'	Stadium: Perrone; Referee: Diego Riveiro

March 10, 2019 4	River Plate	1-1	Danubio	Montevideo
16:30 UTC−3	Olivera 32'; Olivera (yellow card) 36'; Herrera (yellow card) 43'; Urruti (yellow card) 61'; Calzada (yellow card) 74'; Plada (yellow card) 81'	Report	Chacón 58'; Felipe (yellow card) 39'; Ghan (yellow card) 45'; Montes (yellow card) 78'	Stadium: Saroldi; Referee: Andrés Matonte

March 17, 2019 5	Plaza Colonia	1-0	River Plate	Colonia del Sacramento
16:30 UTC−3	Aguiar 65'; Suhr (yellow card) 37'; Tabárez (yellow card) 61'; Guirin (yellow card) 90+3'	Report	Plada (yellow card) 25'; Ospitaleche (yellow card) 37'; Calzada (yellow card) 49' (yellow-red card) 90+4'; Da Luz (yellow card) 76'	Stadium: Prandi; Referee: Leodán González

March 24, 2019 6	River Plate	2-1	Cerro	Montevideo
16:00 UTC−3	Plada 50'; Urruti 80'; M. Alonso (yellow card) 11'; Ospitaleche (yellow card) 35'; Ale (yellow card) 57'	Report	Peraza 55'; Pellejero (red card) 11'; Brasil (yellow card) 16'; F. Alonso (yellow card) 58'; Roldán (yellow card) 74'; Tancredi (yellow card) 76'; Izquierdo (yellow card) 90+3'	Stadium: Saroldi; Referee: Christian Ferreyra

March 30, 2019 7	Cerro Largo	2-0	River Plate	Melo
19:00 UTC−3	Dos Santos 20'; Quintana 90+2'; Graví (yellow card) 74'	Report	Silva (yellow card) 25'; S. Píriz (yellow card) 56'; F. Silvera (yellow card) 57'; Calzada (yellow card) 89'	Stadium: Ubilla; Referee: Gustavo Tejera

April 6, 2019 8	Nacional	6-0	River Plate	Montevideo
16:00 UTC−3	Neves 3'; Amaral 5'; Bergessio 25' 28'; Rivero 67'; Viña 73' (yellow card) 52'; Corujo (yellow card) 66'; Lorenzetti (yellow card) 83'	Report	Píriz (yellow card) 44' (yellow-red card) 76'	Stadium: GPC; Referee: Esteban Ostojich

April 14, 2019 9	River Plate	2-2	Fénix	Montevideo
10:00 UTC−3	Da Luz 2'; Urruti 5'; S. Pérez (yellow card) 17'; Olveira (yellow card) 41'; Hernández (yellow card) 57'; Ospitaleche (yellow card) 87'	Report	M. Pérez 39'; L. Fernández 45+3'; Méndez (yellow card) 28'; R. Fernández (yellow card) 31'; Abascal (yellow card) 32'; Ugarte (yellow card) 70'	Stadium: Saroldi; Referee: Diego Riveiro

April 20, 2019 10	Progreso	4-0	River Plate	Montevideo
16:00 UTC−3	González 32' 57' 78'; Riquero 82'; Andrada (yellow card) 10'; Loffreda (yellow card) 43'	Report	Gorga (yellow card) 79'	Stadium: Paladino; Referee: Christian Ferreyra

May 4, 2019 11 ^{note}	River Plate	0-2	Peñarol	Montevideo
15:00 UTC−3	Calzada (yellow card) 12'; Da Luz (yellow card) 32'; Píriz (yellow card) 79'; Ospitaleche (yellow card) 82'	Report	Lema 3'; Fernández 38'; Trindade (yellow card) 69'; Lores (yellow card) 77'	Stadium: Centenario; Referee: Daniel Fedorczuk

note: Schedule was suspended (on April 28th) due to an aggression which took place against the Uruguayan Referee Association (AUDAF, in Spanish) .

May 11, 2019 12	Defensor Sporting	1-1	River Plate	Montevideo
15:30 UTC−3	Boggio 66' (yellow card) 68'; Nápoli (yellow card) 27'; Álvarez (yellow card) 38'	Report	Píriz 56' (yellow card) 77'; Ospitaleche (yellow card) 20'; Urruti (yellow card) 58'; Leyes (yellow card) 60'; Pérez (yellow card) 65'	Stadium: Franzini; Referee: Antonio García

May 18, 2019 13	River Plate	2-1	Rampla Juniors	Montevideo
15:30 UTC−3	Píriz 47' (yellow card) 15'; Alonso 85'; Pérez (yellow card) 23'; N. Rodríguez (yellow card) 37'; Ospitaleche (yellow card) 44'; Urruti (yellow card) 78'; Gorga (yellow card) 88'; Ale (yellow card) 90+3'	Report	Pereira 90'; Vargas (yellow card) 21'; Felipe (yellow card) 45+1'; Vega (yellow card) 63'; Martínez (red card) 70'	Stadium: Saroldi; Referee: Esteban Ostojich

May 25, 2019 14	Juventud	4-1	River Plate	Las Piedras
15:00 UTC−3	Viñas 29'; Varela 41' 86'; García 68'; Bogado (yellow card) 16'; Alberti (yellow card) 61'; Pintado (yellow card) 75'	Report	Alonso 73'; Silva (yellow card) 34'; Vicente (yellow card) 35'; J. Fernández (red card) 76'; Da Luz (yellow card) 79'	Stadium: Parque Artigas; Referee: Christian Ferreyra

Jun 2, 2019 15	River Plate	0-0	Liverpool	Montevideo
15:00 UTC−3	Pérez (yellow card) 15'; Píriz (yellow card) 18' (yellow-red card) 84'; Urruti (yellow card) 63'; Da Luz (red card) 80'	Report	Romero (yellow card) 2'; Pereira (yellow card) 48'; Medina (yellow card) 90'	Stadium: Saroldi; Referee: Pablo Giménez

=== Group table ===
Pos	Team	Pld	W	D	L	GF	GA	GD	Pts	Qualification
1	River Plate	7	4	3	0	7	3	+4	15	Advance to Torneo Intermedio Final
2	Nacional	7	4	2	1	13	6	+7	14	
3	Progreso	7	2	4	1	9	7	+2	10	
4	Peñarol	7	2	3	2	9	7	+2	9	
5	Defensor Sporting	7	2	3	2	12	12	0	9	
6	Juventud	7	1	4	2	5	7	−2	7	
7	Boston River	7	1	4	2	5	9	−4	7	
8	Danubio	7	0	1	6	5	14	−9	1	

Source: AUF, Soccerway
Rules for classification: 1) Points, 2) Goal difference, 3) Goals for, 4) Head-to-head record, 5) Drawing of lots, 6) Playoff game, in case two teams are tied for first place.

==== Results by round ====
Round	1	2	3	4	5	6	7
Ground	H	A	H	A	A	H	A
Result	D	D	W	W	D	W	W
Position	4	6	4	2	2	1	1

A = Away; H = Home; W = Win; D = Draw; L = Loss

==== Matches ====
Win Draw Loss Postponed

Jul 14, 2019 1	River Plate	0-0	Progreso	Montevideo
15:00 UTC−3		Report	M. Rodríguez (yellow card) 82'	Stadium: Saroldi; Referee: Daniel Fedorczuk

Jul 21, 2019 2	Boston River	0-0	River Plate	Montevideo
15:00 UTC−3	Fernández (yellow card) 37' (yellow-red card) 84'; Foliados (yellow card) 38'; Álvarez (yellow card) 46'; Arias (yellow card) 69'; Fratta (red card) 89'	Report	Olivera (yellow card) 5'; Ospitaleche (yellow card) 52'; Plada (yellow card) 75'	Stadium: Perrone; Referee: Diego Dunajec

Jul 27, 2019 3	River Plate	2-1	Defensor Sporting	Montevideo
15:00 UTC−3	Píriz 18'; Urruti 76'; Vicente (yellow card) 19'; Calzada (yellow card) 40' (yellow-red card) 90+3'; Viera (yellow card) 61'; Ale (yellow card) 71'	Report	Pavone 9'; García (yellow card) 59'; Menosse (yellow card) 70'; Rabuñal (yellow card) 90+5'	Stadium: Saroldi; Referee: Federico Lovesio

Aug 10, 2019 4	Juventud	1-2	River Plate	Las Piedras
15:00 UTC−3	Alberti 24'; G. González (yellow card) 28'; Bogado (yellow card) 90+3'; Domínguez De Freitas (yellow card) 90+4'	Report	Arezo 67'; Urruti 73'; Pérez (yellow card) 48'; J. Fernández (yellow card) 87'; Ospitaleche (yellow card) 89'	Stadium: Parque Artigas; Referee: Christian Ferreyra

Aug 17, 2019 5	Nacional	1-1	River Plate	Montevideo
15:00 UTC−3	Vecino 59' (yellow card) 34'; Laborda (yellow card) 7'; Corujo (yellow card) 28'; Viña (yellow card) 35'; Ocampo (yellow card) 82'	Report	Piqueréz 57' (yellow card) 1'; Herrera (yellow card) 33'; Urruti (red card) 44'; Calzada (yellow card) 51'; Arezo (yellow card) 61'; Leites (yellow card) 77'; Olveira (yellow card) 90+2'	Stadium: GPC; Referee: Leodán González

Aug 24, 2019 6	River Plate	1-0	Peñarol	Montevideo
15:00 UTC−3	Arezo 31'; Viera (yellow card) 43'; Fernández (yellow card) 62'; Olveira (yellow card) 72'	Report		Stadium: Saroldi; Referee: Andrés Cunha

Aug 31, 2019 7	Danubio	0-1	River Plate	Montevideo
15:00 UTC−3	Felipe (yellow card) 8'; Ghan (yellow card) 55' (yellow-red card) 63'; Amuz (yellow card) 65'; Ancheta (yellow card) 75'; Grossmüller (yellow card) 75'	Report	Arezo 47'; Vicente (yellow card) 30'; Viera (yellow card) 59'; Fernández (yellow card) 79'	Stadium: Jardines; Referee: Daniel Fedorczuk

===== Final =====
8 September 2019
15:00

Liverpool	2–2 (a.e.t.)	River Plate
Ramírez 20'; Olivera 97' (yellow card) 98'; Figueredo (yellow card) 11'; Cándido (yellow card) 109'	Report	Piqueréz 69'; Viera 110'; Urruti (yellow card) 45'; Tinaglini (red card) 73'; Viera (yellow card) 90+2'; Píriz (yellow card) 102'; Calzada (yellow card) 105'; Arezo (yellow card) 113'
Penalties
Olivera (penalty scored); Martínez (penalty scored); Ramírez (penalty missed); Cándido (penalty scored); Acevedo (penalty scored); Caballero (penalty scored)	5–4	(penalty scored) Alonso; (penalty scored) Rodríguez; (penalty scored) Leites; (penalty missed) Fernández; (penalty scored) Piqueréz; (penalty missed) Píriz

Estadio Luis Franzini, Montevideo
Referee: Andrés Matonte

=== Clausura 2019 ===
==== League table ====
Pos	Team	Pld	W	D	L	GF	GA	GD	Pts	Qualification
1	Nacional	15	11	1	3	27	10	+17	34	Qualification for Torneo Clausura decider
2	Peñarol	15	10	4	1	21	10	+11	34	Qualification for Torneo Clausura decider
3	Progreso (Note: Progreso were awarded two points and Cerro were deducted one point due to Cerro fielding the ineligible player Martín González during the Torneo Clausura match between both teams.)	15	9	4	2	22	14	+8	33	
4	Plaza Colonia	15	9	2	4	16	9	+7	29	
5	Cerro Largo	15	8	2	5	22	17	+5	26	
6	River Plate	15	6	4	5	20	19	+1	22	
7	Liverpool	15	5	6	4	14	13	+1	21	
8	Boston River	15	6	3	6	18	19	−1	21	
9	Defensor Sporting	15	6	2	7	25	22	+3	20	
10	Montevideo Wanderers	15	5	4	6	19	18	+1	19	
11	Racing	15	4	3	8	20	26	−6	15	
12	Cerro	15	4	3	8	14	22	−8	14	
13	Danubio	15	3	4	8	14	21	−7	13	
14	Juventud	15	2	5	8	13	23	−10	11	
15	Fénix	15	2	5	8	16	27	−11	11	
16	Rampla Juniors	15	2	4	9	16	28	−12	10	

Source: AUF, Soccerway
Rules for classification: 1) Points, 2) Playoff game, in case two teams are tied for first place.
If there are more than two teams tied in points: 2) Goal difference, 3) Goals for, 4) Head-to-head record, 5) Drawing of lots, 6) Playoff game, in case two teams are still tied for first place.

==== Results by round ====
Round	1	2	3	4	5	6	7	8	9	10	11	12	13	14	15
Ground	H	A	H	A	H	A	H	H	A	H	A	H	A	H	A
Result	W	D	L	D	D	L	W	W	L	L	L	W	D	W	W
Position	2	4	9	7	8	10	7	7	7	10	10	8	10	9	6

A = Away; H = Home; W = Win; D = Draw; L = Loss

==== Matches ====
Win Draw Loss Postponed

Sep 14, 2019 1	River Plate	3-1	Wanderers	Montevideo
16:00 UTC−3	Alonso 7'; Urruti 15'; Arezo 45' (yellow card) 63'; Vicente (yellow card) 29'; Hernández (yellow card) 37'	Report	Riolfo 69'; Bravo (red card) 90+3'	Stadium: Saroldi; Referee: Christian Ferreyra

Sep 18, 2019 2	Racing	1-1	River Plate	Montevideo
16:00 UTC−3	Araújo 27'; Ferreyra (yellow card) 13'; Lacoste (yellow card) 86'	Report	Arezo 39'; Hernández (yellow card) 22'; Calzada (yellow card) 29'; Herrera (yellow card) 43'; Viera (yellow card) 68'	Stadium: Roberto; Referee: Andrés Cunha

Sep 22, 2019 3	River Plate	1-4	Boston River	Montevideo
16:00 UTC−3	Leites 90'; Píriz (yellow card) 12'; Ale (yellow card) 53'; Urruti (yellow card) 85'; Neris (red card) 87'	Report	F. Rodríguez 8' 78'; W. Fernández 30'; Fratta 55' (yellow card) 53'; Lozano (yellow card) 18'; Silva (yellow card) 72'; Valdéz (yellow card) 75'	Stadium: Saroldi; Referee: Esteban Ostojich

Oct 4, 2019 4^{note}	Danubio	1-1	River Plate	Montevideo
16:00 UTC−3	Paiva 7' (yellow card) 81'; Acosta (yellow card) 73'	Report	Arezo 45+2'	Stadium: Jardines; Referee: Pablo Giménez

note: Schedule was suspended (on September 27th) due to the death of youth player Agustín Martínez .

Oct 9, 2019 5	River Plate	0-0	Plaza Colonia	Montevideo
16:00 UTC−3	Viera (yellow card) 80'; Ale (yellow card) 86'; Píriz (yellow card) 90+4'	Report	Pérez (yellow card) 11'; Suhr (yellow card) 28'; Redín (yellow card) 90'	Stadium: Saroldi; Referee: Andrés Matonte

Oct 17, 2019 6	Cerro	3-2	River Plate	Montevideo
16:00 UTC−3	S. Viera 15'; López 45+1' (yellow card) 64'; A. Machado 78'; M. González (yellow card) 32' (yellow-red card) 47'; Núñez (yellow card) 73'	Report	Rodríguez 26'; M. Alonso 49'; Salaberry (yellow card) 27'	Stadium: Capurro; Referee: Federico Modernell

Oct 20, 2019 7	River Plate	3-2	Cerro Largo	Montevideo
16:00 UTC−3	Viera 33'; Vicente 36'; N. Rodríguez 41'; Olivera (yellow card) 19'; Salaberry (yellow card) 37'; Calzada (yellow card) 55'; Píriz (yellow card) 81'; Alonso (yellow card) 82'	Report	Luna Diale 52'; Barone 62'; Téliz (yellow card) 32' dos Santos (yellow card) 34'; F. Rodríguez (yellow card) 35'	Stadium: Saroldi; Referee: Christian Ferreyra

Oct 24, 2019 8	River Plate	3-1	Nacional	Montevideo
16:00 UTC−3	Olivera 7'; Urruti 15'; Leites 61'; Viera (yellow card) 40'; Calzada (yellow card) 47'; J. Fernández (yellow card) 70'; Arezo (yellow card) 78'	Report	Bergessio 35' (yellow card) 85'; R. García (yellow card) 31'; Neves (yellow card) 89'	Stadium: Saroldi; Referee: Esteban Ostojich

Nov 3, 2019 9	Fénix	1-0	River Plate	Montevideo
16:00 UTC−3	M. Pérez 22'; Cantera (red card) 44'; N. Moreira (yellow card) 45'; Coelho (yellow card) 61'	Report	Viera (red card) 44'; Rodríguez (yellow card) 49'; Ospitaleche (yellow card) 66'; Olveira (yellow card) 90+2'	Stadium: Capurro; Referee: Federico Lovesio

Nov 6, 2019 10	River Plate	1-2	Progreso	Montevideo
16:00 UTC−3	Piqueréz 32'; Salaberry (yellow card) 21'; Ale (yellow card) 68'	Report	Gularte 53'; Rosso 72'; Alles (yellow card) 31'; Zeballos (yellow card) 61'	Stadium: Saroldi; Referee: Leodán González

Nov 9, 2019 11	Peñarol	1-0	River Plate	Montevideo
19:00 UTC−3	C. Rodríguez 87'; Trindade (yellow card) 53'; Rojas (yellow card) 73'	Report	Fernández (yellow card) 45+1'; N. Rodríguez (yellow card) 50' (yellow-red card) 51'; Alonso (yellow card) 86'; Ospitaleche (yellow card) 90+6'	Stadium: CDS; Referee: Andrés Cunha

Nov 16, 2019 12	River Plate	1-0	Defensor Sporting	Montevideo
16:00 UTC−3	Alonso 33'; Ospitaleche (yellow card) 43'; Plada (yellow card) 59'; Neris (yellow card) 72'; Arezo (yellow card) 83'; G. Rodríguez (yellow card) 90+1'	Report	Gómez (yellow card) 64'	Stadium: Saroldi; Referee: Christian Ferreyra

Nov 22, 2019 13	Rampla Juniors	2-2	River Plate	Montevideo
16:30 UTC−3	Gáspari; Albín 80'; Vega (yellow card) 47' (yellow-red card) 84'	Report	Olivera 58' 82'; Píriz (yellow card) 61'; Ospitaleche (yellow card) 65'; Calzada (yellow card) 90+1'	Stadium: Olímpico; Referee: Gustavo Tejera

Nov 27, 2019 14	River Plate	1-0	Juventud	Montevideo
17:00 UTC−3	Olivera 30'; Ospitaleche (yellow card) 40'	Report	Pintado (yellow card) 62'; Alberti (yellow card) 75'	Stadium: Saroldi; Referee: Oscar Rojas

Dec 5, 2019 15^{note}	Liverpool	0-1	River Plate	Montevideo
17:00 UTC−3	Cáceres (yellow card) 57'; Romero (yellow card) 62'	Report	J. M. Olivera 75' (yellow card) 29'; Pérez (yellow card) 32'; Píriz (yellow card) 66'; J. Fernández (yellow card) 78' (yellow-red card) 90'; Alonso (yellow card) 79'; Calzada (yellow card) 89'	Stadium: Belvedere; Referee: Christian Ferreyra

note: Schedule was suspended (on December 1st) due to an aggression against the AUDAF president Marcelo De León .

=== Overall ===
==== League table ====
Pos	Team	Pld	W	D	L	GF	GA	GD	Pts	Qualification
1	Nacional (C)	37	22	9	6	72	33	+39	75	Qualification for Championship playoff and Copa Libertadores group stage
2	Peñarol	37	21	11	5	58	27	+31	74	Qualification for Championship playoff and Copa Libertadores group stage
3	Cerro Largo	37	21	6	10	56	34	+22	69	Qualification for Copa Libertadores second stage
4	Progreso (Note: Progreso were awarded two points and Cerro were deducted one point due to Cerro fielding the ineligible player Martín González during the Torneo Clausura match between both teams.)	37	17	12	8	58	46	+12	65	Qualification for Copa Libertadores first stage
5	Liverpool	37	16	11	10	61	47	+14	59	Qualification for Copa Sudamericana first stage
6	Plaza Colonia	37	16	8	13	40	37	+3	56	Qualification for Copa Sudamericana first stage
7	River Plate	37	13	12	12	41	52	−11	51	Qualification for Copa Sudamericana first stage
8	Fénix	37	13	9	15	60	63	−3	48	Qualification for Copa Sudamericana first stage
9	Boston River	37	12	12	13	41	50	−9	48	
10	Montevideo Wanderers	37	12	10	15	49	56	−7	46	
11	Defensor Sporting	37	12	9	16	58	61	−3	45	
12	Danubio	37	11	8	18	41	52	−11	41	
13	Racing	37	10	7	20	50	72	−22	37	
14	Rampla Juniors	37	9	8	20	44	62	−18	35	
15	Cerro	37	9	7	21	31	52	−21	33	
16	Juventud	37	7	11	19	39	52	−13	32	

Source: AUF
Rules for classification: 1) Points, 2) Playoff game, in case two teams are tied for first place.
If there are more than two teams tied in points: 2) Goal difference, 3) Goals for, 4) Head-to-head record, 5) Drawing of lots, 6) Playoff game, in case two teams are still tied for first place.
(C) Champions

== 2019 Copa Sudamericana ==
=== First stage ===
12 February 2019
18:15 UTC−3

River Plate	0–0	(Brazil) Santos
(yellow card) 77' Leyes	Report	(red card) 20' Orinho; (yellow card) 90+2' González

Estadio Luis Franzini, Montevideo (Note: River Plate played their home match at Estadio Luis Franzini, Montevideo, instead of their regular stadium Parque Federico Omar Saroldi, Montevideo.)
Referee: (Argentina) Germán Delfino

26 February 2019
19:15 UTC−3

Santos (Brazil)	1-1	River Plate
Soteldo 86'; Cardoso (yellow card) 77'; Yuri (yellow card) 79'	Report	Da Luz 54'; Calzada (yellow card) 53'; Silva (yellow card) 80'; L. Olivera (yellow card) 87'

Estádio do Pacaembu, São Paulo (Note: Santos will play their home match at Estádio do Pacaembu, São Paulo, instead of their regular stadium Estádio Urbano Caldeira, Santos.)
Referee: (Argentina) Mauro Vigliano

Tied 1–1 on aggregate, River Plate won on away goals and advanced to the second stage.

=== Second stage ===
21 May 2019
19:15 UTC−3

River Plate	0-0	(Argentina) Colón
N. Rodríguez (yellow card) 74'; Plada (yellow card) 83'; Herrera (yellow card) 86'	Report	Zuqui (yellow card) 10'; Bernardi (yellow card) 33'; Celis (yellow card) 79'; Pierotti (yellow card) 90+3'

Estadio Centenario, Montevideo (Note: River Plate will play their home match at Estadio Centenario, Montevideo, instead of their regular stadium Parque Federico Omar Saroldi, Montevideo.)
Referee: (Paraguay) Mario Díaz de Vivar

28 May 2019
19:15 UTC−3

Colón (Argentina)	3-1	River Plate
Bernardi 18' (yellow card) 33'; Morelo 25'; Leguizamón 85'; E. Olivera (yellow card) 19'; Estigarribia (yellow card) 48'; Escobar (yellow card) 87'; Zuqui (red card) 90+6'	Report	Da Luz 16' (yellow card) 44'; Ale (yellow card) 29'; Píriz (yellow card) 57' (red card) 90+8'; Urruti (yellow card) 76'; Alonso (yellow card) 82'

Estadio Brigadier General Estanislao López, Santa Fe
Referee: (Brazil) Ricardo Marques

Colón advances to the round of 16 (Match E).
