= 2018 River Plate Montevideo season =

River Plate
2018 season
- President: Willie Tucci
- Head coach: Pablo Tiscornia (March 14, 2017 – August 27, 2018); Jorge Giordano (from August 30, 2017)
- Stadium: Estadio Saroldi
- Uruguayan Primera División: 8th
- Top goalscorer: League: Matías Jones (9 goals); All: Matías Jones (9 goals)
Home colours	Away colours	Third colours

River Plate took part in the Uruguayan Primera División and Torneo Intermedio. At the same time, u-20 squad competed in 2018 U-20 Copa Libertadores and reached top three. This tournament was held in Uruguay from 10 to 24 February 2018. River Plate qualified for 2019 Copa Sudamericana.

Pablo Tiscornia was removed on August 27 due to bad results.

== Transfer Window ==
=== Summer 2018 ===
==== In ====
Position	Nationality	Name	Age	From	Fee	Transfer Window	Ref.
FW	(Uruguay)	Matías Alonso	32	(Bolivia) The Strongest	Free agent	Summer	tenfield.com.uy
FW	(Uruguay)	Martín Correa	26	Torque	Free agent	Summer	tenfield.com.uy
MF	(Uruguay)	Maximiliano Calzada	27	(Argentina) Arsenal	Free agent	Summer	ovaciondigital.com.uy

==== Out ====
Position	Nationality	Name	Age	To	Fee	Transfer Window	Ref.
FW	(Uruguay)	Mathías Saavedra	28	Torque	Free agent	Summer	tenfield.com.uy
MF	(Uruguay)	Giovanni González	23	Peñarol	Free agent	Summer	tenfield.com.uy
MF	(Uruguay)	Bruno Piñatares	27	(Ecuador) Delfín S.C.	Free agent	Summer	eluniverso.com
MF	(Uruguay)	Gonzalo Vega	25	(Hungary) Puskás AFC	Free agent	Summer	rangado.24.hu
MF	(Uruguay)	Santiago Scotto	20	Fénix	Free agent	Summer	tenfield.com.uy
FW	(Uruguay)	Álvaro Fernández	19	Fénix	Free agent	Summer	tenfield.com.uy
MF	(Uruguay)	Fabricio Fernández	24	Miramar Misiones	Free agent	Summer	tenfield.com.uy
FW	(Uruguay)	Alexander Rosso	24	Progreso	Free agent	Summer	tenfield.com.uy

=== Winter 2018 ===
==== In ====
Position	Nationality	Name	Age	From	Fee	Transfer Window	Ref.
FW	(Uruguay)	Gabriel Leyes	28	(Peru) Alianza Lima	Free agent	Winter	tenfield.com.uy
FW	(Uruguay)	Luis Urruti	25	Peñarol	Free agent	Winter	tenfield.com.uy
MF	(Uruguay)	Matías Ebre	21	Reserves	–	Winter	tenfield.com.uy
DF	(Uruguay)	Emiliano García	28	(Ecuador) Guayaquil City	Free agent	Winter	tenfield.com.uy

==== Out ====
Position	Nationality	Name	Age	To	Fee	Transfer Window	Ref.
FW	(Uruguay)	Facundo Peraza	25	(Venezuela) Academia Puerto Cabello	Free agent	Winter	tenfield.com.uy
MF	(Uruguay)	Martín Correa	26	Defensor Sporting	Transfer	Winter	tenfield.com.uy
DF	(Uruguay)	Claudio Herrera	30	Peñarol	Free agent	Winter	ovacion.com.uy

== Squad ==
=== First team squad ===
As of Aug 14, 2018

Note: Flags indicate national team as defined under FIFA eligibility rules; some limited exceptions apply. Players may hold more than one non-FIFA nationality.

No.	Pos.	Nation	Player
1	GK	URU	Nicola Pérez
2	DF	URU	Agustín Ale
3	DF	URU	Deivis Barone
3	DF	URU	Emiliano García
5	MF	URU	Facundo Ospitaleche
6	DF	URU	Williams Martínez
7	DF	URU	Nicolás Rodríguez
8	MF	URU	Maximiliano Calzada
9	FW	URU	Gabriel Leyes
10	MF	URU	Matías Jones
12	GK	URU	Lucas Machado
13	MF	URU	Matías Ebre
14	DF	URU	Iván Silva
15	DF	URU	Joaquín Fernández

No.	Pos.	Nation	Player
17	FW	URU	Mauro Da Luz
18	MF	URU	Diego Vicente
19	FW	URU	Juan Manuel Olivera
20	DF	URU	Diego Rodríguez
21	FW	URU	Cristian Martin
22	DF	URU	Claudio Herrera
23	FW	URU	Matías Alonso
24	MF	URU	Pablo González
25	GK	URU	Gastón Olveira
26	DF	URU	Facundo Silvera
27	FW	URU	Facundo Boné
28	MF	URU	José Neris
29	FW	URU	Facundo Vigo
30	FW	URU	Ezequiel Peña

=== Top scorers ===
Last update on Nov 8, 2018

Rank	Pos.	No.	Name	Primera División	Torneo Intermedio	Total
1	MF	10	(Uruguay) Matías Jones	9	0	9
2	FW	17	(Uruguay) Mauro Da Luz	8	0	8
3	FW	19	(Uruguay) Juan Manuel Olivera	6	1	7
3	FW	27	(Uruguay) Facundo Boné	4	3	7
4	DF	7	(Uruguay) Nicolás Rodríguez	6	0	6
5	MF	-	(Uruguay) Martín Correa	3	1	4
6	FW	11	(Uruguay) Luis Urruti	3	0	3
6	FW	23	(Uruguay) Matías Alonso	3	0	3
7	DF	6	(Uruguay) Williams Martínez	2	0	2
8	DF	2	(Uruguay) Agustín Ale	1	0	1
8	MF	5	(Uruguay) Facundo Ospitaleche	1	0	1
8	MF	8	(Uruguay) Maximiliano Calzada	1	0	1
-	Own goals	-	-	1	0	1
Total				48	5	53

=== Disciplinary record ===
Last updated on Nov 8,2018

No.	Pos	Nat	Name	Primera División			Torneo Intermedio			Total		
No.	Pos	Nat	Name	Yellow card	(yellow card) (yellow-red card)	Red card	Yellow card	(yellow card) (yellow-red card)	Red card	Yellow card	(yellow card) (yellow-red card)	Red card
Goalkeepers
1	DF	(Uruguay)	Nicola Pérez	1	0	0	0	0	0	1	0	0
Defenders
2	DF	(Uruguay)	Agustín Ale	12	0	0	2	0	0	14	0	0
4	DF	(Uruguay)	Emiliano García	2	0	1	0	0	0	2	0	1
3	DF	(Uruguay)	Deivis Barone	1	0	0	1	0	0	2	0	0
6	DF	(Uruguay)	Williams Martínez	6	0	0	1	1	0	7	1	0
7	DF	(Uruguay)	Nicolás Rodríguez	2	0	1	0	0	0	2	0	1
20	DF	(Uruguay)	Diego Rodríguez	4	0	0	0	0	0	4	0	0
26	DF	(Uruguay)	Facundo Silvera	6	0	0	0	0	0	6	0	0
Midfielders
5	MF	(Uruguay)	Facundo Ospitaleche	9	0	0	1	0	0	10	0	0
8	MF	(Uruguay)	Maximiliano Calzada	10	1	0	3	0	0	13	1	0
10	MF	(Uruguay)	Matías Jones	4	0	0	0	0	0	4	0	0
24	MF	(Uruguay)	Pablo González	4	0	0	1	0	0	5	0	0
28	MF	(Uruguay)	José Neris	1	0	0	0	0	0	1	0	0
Forwards
9	FW	(Uruguay)	Gabriel Leyes	3	0	0	0	0	0	3	0	0
11	FW	(Uruguay)	Luis Urruti	1	0	1	0	0	0	1	0	1
17	FW	(Uruguay)	Mauro Da Luz	2	0	0	0	0	0	2	0	0
19	FW	(Uruguay)	Juan Manuel Olivera	4	0	0	0	0	0	4	0	0
23	FW	(Uruguay)	Matías Alonso	1	0	0	0	0	0	1	0	0
27	FW	(Uruguay)	Facundo Boné	3	0	0	1	0	0	4	0	0
30	FW	(Uruguay)	Facundo Vigo	1	0	1	0	0	0	1	0	1
Players transferred out during the season
9	FW	(Uruguay)	Facundo Peraza	2	0	0	0	0	0	2	0	0
11	MF	(Uruguay)	Martín Correa	1	0	0	2	0	0	3	0	0
22	DF	(Uruguay)	Claudio Herrera	1	0	0	1	0	1	2	0	1
Total				82	1	4	12	1	1	94	2	5

== Primera División ==
=== Apertura 2018 ===
==== League table ====
Pos	Team	Pld	W	D	L	GF	GA	GD	Pts	Qualification
1	Nacional	15	12	2	1	26	8	+18	38	Qualification to Championship playoff
2	Peñarol	15	11	3	1	28	10	+18	36	
3	Danubio	15	9	3	3	23	13	+10	30	
4	Defensor Sporting	15	9	3	3	26	20	+6	30	
5	Liverpool (Note: Liverpool were awarded two points and Boston River were deducted one point due to a breach of rules by a member of the managerial staff of Boston River during the Torneo Apertura match between both teams.)	15	7	4	4	17	16	+1	27	
6	River Plate	15	7	4	4	28	22	+6	25	
7	Cerro	15	7	4	4	16	18	−2	25	
8	Progreso	15	6	3	6	25	17	+8	21	
9	Fénix	15	6	2	7	18	18	0	20	
10	Boston River	15	5	5	5	17	21	−4	19	
11	Montevideo Wanderers	15	5	3	7	14	20	−6	18	
12	Atenas	15	5	1	9	11	27	−16	16	
13	Racing	15	3	3	9	14	24	−10	12	
14	Torque	15	2	4	9	13	27	−14	10	
15	Rampla Juniors	15	2	4	9	12	27	−15	10	
16	El Tanque Sisley	0	0	0	0	0	0	0	0	Withdrew from league (Note: El Tanque Sisley withdrew from the league due to outstanding debts.)

Source: AUF, Soccerway
Rules for classification: 1) Points, 2) Playoff game, in case two teams are tied for first place.
If there are more than two teams tied in points: 2) Goal difference, 3) Goals for, 4) Head-to-head record, 5) Drawing of lots, 6) Playoff game, in case two teams are still tied for first place.

==== Results by round ====
Round	1	2	3	4	5	6	7	8	9	10	11	12	13	14	15
Ground	H	A	H	A	H	A	H	A	H	A	H	H	A	H	W/O
Result	D	L	W	L	D	W	W	L	W	L	D	D	W	W	W
Position	7	12	10	12	11	9	8	9	7	10	10	10	6	6	6

A = Away; H = Home; W = Win; D = Draw; L = Loss; W/O = Walkover

==== Matches ====
Win Draw Loss Postponed

February 3, 2018 1	River Plate	2-2	Boston River	Montevideo
17:00 UTC−3	Martínez 42' (yellow card) 90'; Da Luz 74'; Jones (yellow card) 20'; Calzada (yellow card) 23'; Olivera (yellow card) 45+1'; Ale (yellow card) 66'; Ospitaleche (yellow card) 69'; N. Rodríguez (red card) 83'	Report	Álvarez 27' (yellow card) 90+2'; Gutiérrez 84'; Scotti (yellow card) 60'; Nadruz (yellow card) 90+3'	Stadium: Saroldi; Referee: Andrés Matonte

February 11, 2018 2	Peñarol	4-1	River Plate	Montevideo
19:30 UTC−3	C. Rodríguez 49' (red card) 12'; Gargano 59'; Estoyanoff 74'; González 79'; Arias (yellow card) 45+1'	Report	Alonso 85'; Calzada (yellow card) 3'; Da Luz (yellow card) 31'; Peraza (yellow card) 61'; Boné (yellow card) 90'	Stadium: Campeón del Siglo; Referee: Jonathan Fuentes

February 18, 2018 3	River Plate	3-1	Atenas	Montevideo
17:00 UTC−3	Jones 49' 63' 69'; González (yellow card) 74'; Alonso (yellow card) 84'; D. Rodríguez (yellow card) 88'	Report	Vanderhoeght 77'; Pintos (yellow card) 84'	Stadium: Saroldi; Referee: Oscar Rojas

February 25, 2018 4	Danubio	1-0	River Plate	Montevideo
17:00 UTC−3	Terans 80'; J. Rodríguez (yellow card) 62'; Camargo (yellow card) 86'	Report	Calzada (yellow card) 49'	Stadium: Jardines del Hipódromo; Referee: Javier Bentancor

March 4, 2018 5	River Plate	2-2	Torque	Montevideo
16:30 UTC−3	Alonso 58'; Da Luz 78'; D. Rodríguez (yellow card) 63'; Ale (yellow card) 72'; Calzada (yellow card) 79'; Ospitaleche (yellow card) 82'	Report	Ferraresi 10'; Castellanos 36'; Barrios (yellow card) 37'; Roskopf (yellow card) 82'	Stadium: Saroldi; Referee: Federico Arman

March 11, 2018 6	Rampla Juniors	1-2	River Plate	Montevideo
16:30 UTC−3	Martiñones 86' (yellow card) 88'; Lalinde (yellow card) 13'; Rizzo (yellow card) 40'; Panzariello (yellow card) 72'	Report	N. Rodríguez 36' (yellow card) 85'; Correa 70'; Calzada (yellow card) 53'; D. Rodríguez (yellow card) 71'; Ale (yellow card) 79'	Stadium: Olímpico; Referee: Christian Ferreyra

March 17, 2018 7	River Plate	2-1	Fénix	Montevideo
16:30 UTC−3	Olivera 81' (yellow card) 81'; N. Rodríguez 85'; Ospitaleche (yellow card) 70'	Report	Acuña 39'; Abascal (yellow card) 15'; Ferro (yellow card) 56'; Denis (yellow card) 62'	Stadium: Saroldi; Referee: Antonio García

March 25, 2018 8	Nacional	1-0	River Plate	Montevideo
18:00 UTC−3	De Pena 59'; Espino (yellow card) 54'; Polenta (yellow card) 85'	Report	Martínez (yellow card) 23'; Herrera (yellow card) 42'; Peraza (yellow card) 73'	Stadium: Gran Parque Central; Referee: Oscar Rojas

March 28, 2018 9	River Plate	4-2	Progreso	Montevideo
16:00 UTC−3	Alonso 35'; Martínez 69'; Da Luz 77'; Boné 90+3' (yellow card) 88'	Report	Burgueño 41' 55'; Rosso (yellow card) 29'; Loffreda (yellow card) 58'; Gottesman (yellow card) 75'; Makuka (yellow card) 78'; Méndez (yellow card) 90+1'	Stadium: Saroldi; Referee: Leodán González

April 1, 2018 10	Defensor Sporting	5-2	River Plate	Montevideo
16:00 UTC−3	Boselli 5'; Cabrera 39'; Rabuñal 72'; Goñi 83'; Castro 89'; Carrera (yellow card) 15'; Cardaccio (yellow card) 27'; G. Rivero (yellow card) 48'	Report	Jones 31'; N. Rodríguez 86'; Martínez (yellow card) 17'; Calzada (red card) 53'; Pérez (yellow card) 53'; Ale (yellow card) 75'	Stadium: Franzini; Referee: Jonathan Fuentes

April 8, 2018 11	River Plate	1-1	Racing	Montevideo
16:00 UTC−3	N. Rodríguez 69'; Ospitaleche (yellow card) 29'; Martínez (yellow card) 32'	Report	Barrientos 77'; Estol (yellow card) 14'; A. Rodríguez (yellow card) 81'; Cabrera (yellow card) 87'	Stadium: Saroldi; Referee: Adrián Pareira

April 14, 2018 12	River Plate	1-1	Cerro	Montevideo
16:00 UTC−3	Correa 41'; N. Rodríguez (yellow card) 60'; Ospitaleche (yellow card) 71'; P. González (yellow card) 90+2'	Report	N. González 58'; Zazpe (yellow card) 45'; Torres (yellow card) 81'; Franco (yellow card) 90+2'	Stadium: Saroldi; Referee: Pablo Giménez

April 21, 2018 13	Montevideo Wanderers	0-3	River Plate	Montevideo
16:00 UTC−3	Méndez (yellow card) 25'; Villoldo (yellow card) 30'; Lima (yellow card) 43'; Araujo (yellow card) 51'; Macaluso (yellow card) 68' (yellow-red card) 68'	Report	N. Rodríguez 40'; Olivera 44'; Da Luz 79'; Boné (yellow card) 6'; Silvera (yellow card) 47'; Correa (yellow card) 67'; P. González (yellow card) 77'	Stadium: Viera; Referee: Esteban Ostojich

April 29, 2018 14	River Plate	5-0	Liverpool	Montevideo
16:00 UTC−3	Olivera 14'; Ale 35' (yellow card) 30'; Boné 55'; N. Rodríguez 71'; Correa 81'; Martínez (yellow card) 79'	Report	Rivas (yellow card) 51'; Sousa (yellow card) 76'; Alaníz (red card) 25'; Núñez (red card) 60'	Stadium: Viera; Referee: Esteban Ostojich

15^{1}	River Plate	W.O.	El Tanque Sisley	Montevideo
-	-	Report	-	Stadium: - Referee: -

1: El Tanque Sisley withdrew from the league due to outstanding debts.

=== Torneo Intermedio (Group B) ===
==== Group table ====
Pos	Team	Pld	W	D	L	GF	GA	GD	Pts	Qualification
1	Torque	6	4	1	1	10	6	+4	13	Advance to Torneo Intermedio Final
2	Peñarol	6	4	0	2	20	10	+10	12	
3	River Plate	6	2	3	1	5	9	−4	9	
4	Atenas	6	2	2	2	6	5	+1	8	
5	Progreso	6	1	3	2	5	7	−2	6	
6	Defensor Sporting	6	2	0	4	4	8	−4	6	
7	Boston River	6	1	1	4	2	7	−5	4	

Source: AUF, Soccerway
Rules for classification: 1) Points, 2) Goal difference, 3) Goals for, 4) Head-to-head record, 5) Drawing of lots, 6) Playoff game, in case two teams are still tied for first place.

==== Results by round ====
Round	1	2	3	4	5	6	7
Ground	A	H	A	A	H	A	-
Result	D	W	L	D	W	D	-
Position	3	2	3	3	2	2	3

A = Away; H = Home; W = Win; D = Draw; L = Loss

==== Matches ====
Win Draw Loss Postponed

May 9, 2018 1	Torque	2-2	River Plate	San José de Mayo
15:30 UTC−3	Sena 64'; Rolfo 86'; Mallo (yellow card) 28'; Bonjour (yellow card) 83'	Report	Boné 21' 65'; Martínez (yellow card) 58'; Calzada (yellow card) 72'; Herrera (red card) 90+2'	Stadium: Casto Martínez Laguarda; Referee: Claudia Umpiérrez

May 12, 2018 2	River Plate	1-0	Defensor Sporting	Montevideo
15:30 UTC−3	Olivera 65'; Barone (yellow card) 24'; Boné (yellow card) 27'	Report	Maulella (yellow card) 31'; Carrera (yellow card) 32'; Boselli (yellow card) 60'; Rabuñal (yellow card) 88'	Stadium: Saroldi; Referee: Claudia Umpiérrez

May 20, 2018 3	Peñarol	6-0	River Plate	Montevideo
19:05 UTC−3	W. Martínez 11' (o.g.); Palacios 28' 66'; M. Rodríguez 30'; C. Rodríguez 36'; Arias 53'	Report	Herrera (yellow card) 15'; Correa (yellow card) 17'; W. Martínez (red card) 32'; Calzada (yellow card) 83'	Stadium: Campeón del Siglo; Referee: Daniel Fedorczuk

May 27, 2018 4	Progreso	0-0	River Plate	Montevideo
15:00 UTC−3	Millacet (yellow card) 40'; Loffreda (yellow card) 41'	Report	Calzada (yellow card) 69'	Stadium: Paladino; Referee: Federico Lovesio

May 30, 2018 5	River Plate	1-0	Boston River	Montevideo
15:00 UTC−3	Boné 38'; Ale (yellow card) 42'; Ospitaleche (yellow card) 79'	Report	Fernández (yellow card) 52'; Scotti (yellow card) 79'	Stadium: Saroldi; Referee: Christian Ferreyra

June 3, 2018 6	Atenas	1-1	River Plate	San Carlos
15:00 UTC−3	Mosquera 90+2'; Rabino (yellow card) 10'; Pintos (yellow card) 44'; Barboza (yellow card) 60'; Sosa (yellow card) 89'	Report	Correa 41' (yellow card) 67'; González (yellow card) 35'; Ale (yellow card) 44'	Stadium: Atenas; Referee: Claudia Umpiérrez

=== Clausura 2018 ===
==== League table ====
Pos	Team	Pld	W	D	L	GF	GA	GD	Pts	Qualification
1	Peñarol	15	11	3	1	25	9	+16	36	Qualification to Championship playoff
2	Nacional	15	9	3	3	19	14	+5	30	
3	Montevideo Wanderers	15	8	4	3	26	20	+6	28	
4	Racing	15	7	4	4	17	13	+4	25	
5	Liverpool	15	6	5	4	22	17	+5	23	
6	Defensor Sporting	15	6	4	5	23	19	+4	22	
7	Progreso	15	6	4	5	21	19	+2	22	
8	Rampla Juniors	15	5	6	4	16	16	0	21	
9	Cerro	15	5	6	4	22	23	−1	21	
10	Danubio	15	4	8	3	13	15	−2	20	
11	Torque	15	4	6	5	16	18	−2	18	
12	Fénix	15	5	3	7	16	19	−3	18	
13	River Plate	15	4	3	8	20	33	−13	15	
14	Boston River	15	4	2	9	14	22	−8	14	
15	Atenas	15	2	7	6	12	24	−12	13	
16	El Tanque Sisley	0	0	0	0	0	0	0	0	Withdrew from league (Note: El Tanque Sisley withdrew from the league due to outstanding debts.)

Source: AUF, Soccerway
Rules for classification: 1) Points, 2) Playoff game, in case two teams are tied for first place.
If there are more than two teams tied in points: 2) Goal difference, 3) Goals for, 4) Head-to-head record, 5) Drawing of lots, 6) Playoff game, in case two teams are still tied for first place.

==== Results by round ====
Round	1	2	3	4	5	6	7	8	9	10	11	12	13	14	15
Ground	A	H	A	H	A	H	A	H	A	H	A	A	H	A	W/O
Result	W	L	D	L	L	L	W	D	D	W	L	L	L	L	W
Position	2	9	7	9	12	14	12	13	12	11	12	12	12	15	13

A = Away; H = Home; W = Win; D = Draw; L = Loss

==== Matches ====
Win Draw Loss Postponed

July 21, 2018 1	Boston River	2-3	River Plate	Las Piedras
15:00 UTC−3	Adorno 50'; Coelho 72'; Fernández (yellow card) 47'; Acosta (yellow card) 90+3'	Report	Jones 55' 90+2'; Da Luz 78'; Silvera (yellow card) 48'; Neris (yellow card) 75'	Stadium: Parque Artigas; Referee: Fernando Falce

July 29, 2018 2	River Plate	0-1	Peñarol	Montevideo
15:00 UTC−3	Jones (yellow card) 32'; Silvera (yellow card) 40'; Ale (yellow card) 57'; Calzada (yellow card) 75'; Vigo (yellow card) 90+3'	Report	C. Rodríguez 41' (yellow card) 82'; Viatri (yellow card) 11'; Pereira (yellow card) 59'	Stadium: Saroldi; Referee: Esteban Ostojich

August 4, 2018 3	Atenas	1-1	River Plate	San Carlos
15:00 UTC−3	Ramos 76'; Cabrera (yellow card) 45'	Report	Da Luz 23'; Silvera (yellow card) 26'; Calzada (yellow card) 29'; Barone (yellow card) 76'; Jones (yellow card) 83'; Leyes (yellow card) 89'	Stadium: Atenas; Referee: Adrián Pereira

August 12, 2018 4	River Plate	1-2	Danubio	Montevideo
15:00 UTC−3	Jones 69'; Ale (yellow card) 49'; Ospitaleche (yellow card) 90+4'	Report	Navarro 68' 71'; J. Rodríguez (yellow card) 18'; Felipe (yellow card) 62'	Stadium: Saroldi; Referee: Federico Arman

August 19, 2018 5	Torque	3-0	River Plate	Montevideo
15:00 UTC−3	Mallo 26' (yellow card) 37'; Gómez 29'; Rodríguez 90+1' (yellow card) 82'	Report	García (yellow card) 35'; P. González (yellow card) 62'; Ale (yellow card) 69'	Stadium: Centenario; Referee: Christian Ferreyra

August 26, 2018 6	River Plate	3-4	Rampla Juniors	Montevideo
15:30 UTC−3	Jones 38' (yellow card) 20'; Urruti 46'; Ospitaleche 55'; García (red card) 64'; Calzada (yellow card) 82'	Report	Martiñonez 49' 79'; Coccaro 86' 90'; Dorrego (yellow card) 90+4'	Stadium: Saroldi; Referee: Andrés Cunha

September 1, 2018 7	Fénix	1-3	River Plate	Montevideo
15:30 UTC−3	Mozzone 17'; R. Fernández (red card) 40'; Cantera (yellow card) 55'; Ferro (yellow card) 84'	Report	Olivera 15'; Urruti 58' 70' (yellow card) 34'; Silvera (yellow card) 50'; Martínez (yellow card) 53'; Vigo (red card) 90'	Stadium: Capurro; Referee: Esteban Ostojich

September 9, 2018 8	River Plate	0-0	Nacional	Montevideo
15:30 UTC−3	Ospitaleche (yellow card) 57'; Ale (yellow card) 86'	Report	R. García (yellow card) 17'; Oliva (yellow card) 60'	Stadium: Saroldi; Referee: Christian Ferreyra

September 16, 2018 9	Progreso	2-2	River Plate	Montevideo
15:30 UTC−3	Labandeira 48' 65'; Freitas (yellow card) 44'; Lemmo (yellow card) 84'; Zeballos (yellow card) 86'; Makuka (yellow card) 90+3'	Report	Boné 58'; Jones 82'; Olivera (yellow card) 29'; D. Rodríguez (yellow card) 48'; Ale (yellow card) 75'; Leyes (yellow card) 88'	Stadium: Paladino; Referee: Antonio García

September 23, 2018 10	River Plate	3-2	Defensor Sporting	Montevideo
16:00 UTC−3	Olivera 26' (yellow card) 62'; Da Luz 57'; Boné 61'; Leyes (yellow card) 86'	Report	Navarro 41' 78'; Piquerez (yellow card) 20'; Cougo (yellow card) 47'; Suárez (yellow card) 62'; Cristóbal (yellow card) 86'; Reyes (yellow card) 90+3'	Stadium: Saroldi; Referee: Leodán González

October 7, 2018 11	Racing	2-1	River Plate	Montevideo
16:00 UTC−3	Trindade 36'; Barrientos 90+5'; Cayetano (yellow card) 40'; Alvite (yellow card) 55'; Lacoste (yellow card) 56'; Méndez (yellow card) 62'	Report	Da Luz 90+2'; Calzada (yellow card) 28'; Ospitaleche (yellow card) 35'; García (yellow card) 64'	Stadium: Roberto; Referee: Esteban Ostojich

October 14, 2018 12	Cerro	4-2	River Plate	Montevideo
16:00 UTC−3	López 10'; Zazpe 78' (yellow card) 49'; Acevedo 86'; Acuña 90+1'; Izquierdo (yellow card) 5'; Klein (yellow card) 54'	Report	Núñez 50' (o.g.); Olivera 69'; Ale (yellow card) 54'; Ospitaleche (yellow card) 75'	Stadium: Tróccoli; Referee: Gustavo Tejera

October 21, 2018 13	River Plate	0-5	Montevideo Wanderers	Montevideo
16:00 UTC−3	Urruti (red card) 33'; Da Luz (yellow card) 43'	Report	Albarracín 21' 60'; Castro 71' 73'; Méndez 75'; Riolfo (yellow card) 14'; Villoldo (yellow card) 47'	Stadium: Saroldi; Referee: Javier Bentancor

October 28, 2018 14	Liverpool	4-1	River Plate	Montevideo
16:30 UTC−3	F. Martínez 41' 83'; Ramírez 61' (yellow card) 61'; Souza 73'; Rivas (yellow card) 67'	Report	Calzada 31' (yellow card) 35'; Silvera (yellow card) 60'; Ale (yellow card) 76'	Stadium: Belvedere; Referee: Adrián Pereira

15^{1}	El Tanque Sisley	W.O.	River Plate	Montevideo
-	-	Report	-	Stadium: - Referee: -

1: El Tanque Sisley withdrew from the league due to outstanding debts.

=== Overall ===
==== League table ====
Pos	Team	Pld	W	D	L	GF	GA	GD	Pts	Qualification
1	Peñarol (Note: Torneo Intermedio points after weighting: Torque: 15.166, Peñarol: 14, River Plate: 10.5, Atenas: 9.333, Progreso: 7, Defensor Sporting: 7, Boston River: 4.666)	36	26	6	4	73	30	+43	86	Qualification to Championship playoff and Copa Libertadores group stage
2	Nacional	37	26	7	4	64	27	+37	85	Qualification to Championship playoff and Copa Libertadores group stage
3	Danubio	37	16	12	9	48	40	+8	60	Qualification to Copa Libertadores second stage
4	Defensor Sporting	36	17	7	12	53	47	+6	59	Qualification to Copa Libertadores first stage
5	Cerro	37	15	14	8	47	46	+1	59	Qualification to Copa Sudamericana first stage (Note: Since the Torneo Intermedio winners (Nacional) qualified for the Copa Libertadores, the spot awarded to the Torneo Intermedio winners (Copa Sudamericana first stage) was passed down to the next best-placed team, in this case to the sixth-placed team.)
6	Liverpool (Note: Liverpool were awarded two points and Boston River were deducted one point due to a breach of rules by a member of the managerial staff of Boston River during the Torneo Apertura match between both teams.)	37	15	11	11	49	44	+5	58	Qualification to Copa Sudamericana first stage
7	Montevideo Wanderers	37	16	7	14	48	50	−2	55	Qualification to Copa Sudamericana first stage
8	River Plate	36	13	10	13	53	64	−11	50.5	Qualification to Copa Sudamericana first stage
9	Progreso	36	13	10	13	51	43	+8	50	
10	Racing	37	13	8	16	36	46	−10	47	
11	Torque	36	10	11	15	39	51	−12	43.166	
12	Fénix	37	12	7	18	41	50	−9	43	
13	Atenas	36	9	10	17	29	56	−27	38.333	
14	Boston River	36	10	8	18	33	50	−17	37.666	
15	Rampla Juniors	37	9	10	18	37	57	−20	37	
16	El Tanque Sisley	0	0	0	0	0	0	0	0	Withdrew from league (Note: El Tanque Sisley withdrew from the league due to outstanding debts.)

Source: AUF
Rules for classification: 1) Points, 2) Playoff game, in case two teams are tied for first place.
If there are more than two teams tied in points: 2) Goal difference, 3) Goals for, 4) Head-to-head record, 5) Drawing of lots, 6) Playoff game, in case two teams are still tied for first place.

== 2018 U-20 Copa Libertadores ==
=== Squad ===
As of Feb 9, 2018

Note: Flags indicate national team as defined under FIFA eligibility rules; some limited exceptions apply. Players may hold more than one non-FIFA nationality.

No.	Pos.	Nation	Player
1	GK	URU	Francisco Tinaglini
2	DF	URU	Facundo Rodríguez
3	DF	URU	Joaquín Fernández
4	DF	URU	Matías Streccia
5	MF	URU	Federico Viotti
6	DF	URU	Santiago Pérez
7	MF	URU	Juan Pablo Plada
8	MF	URU	José Neris
9	FW	URU	Cristian Martin
10	FW	URU	Aaron Borges

No.	Pos.	Nation	Player
11	FW	URU	Facundo Vigo
12	GK	URU	Lucas Machado
13	DF	URU	Agustín Morales
14	DF	URU	Facundo Falcón
15	DF	URU	Bruno Páez
16	DF	URU	Federico Tubin
17	FW	URU	Cristian Sellanes
18	MF	URU	Tomás Viñoly
19	MF	URU	Diego Vicente
20	FW	URU	Pablo Copello

Coach: (Uruguay) Néstor Márquez
Assistant: (Uruguay) Luis Romero

=== Group B ===
==== Matches ====
11 February 2018
18:45

River Plate	1–0	(Colombia) La Equidad
Vigo 78'	Report

Estadio Centenario, Montevideo
Referee: (Argentina) Fernando Echenique

14 February 2018
16:30

Libertad (Paraguay)	0–0	River Plate
	Report

Estadio Centenario, Montevideo
Referee: (Venezuela) Alexis Herrera

17 February 2018
18:45

Cruzeiro (Brazil)	0–1	River Plate
	Report	Vigo 11'

Estadio Centenario, Montevideo
Referee: (Chile) Cesar Deischler

==== Group table ====
Pos	Team	Pld	W	D	L	GF	GA	GD	Pts	Qualification
1	(Uruguay) River Plate (H)	3	2	1	0	2	0	+2	7	Semi-finals
2	(Paraguay) Libertad	3	1	2	0	5	3	+2	5	
3	(Colombia) La Equidad	3	1	1	1	4	4	0	4	
4	(Brazil) Cruzeiro	3	0	0	3	2	6	−4	0	

Source: CONMEBOL
(H) Hosts

=== Semi-final ===
21 February 2018
18:45

River Plate	2–3	(Ecuador) Independiente del Valle
Neris 51'; Vigo 53'	Report	Jaramillo 40' 75'; Plata 73'

Estadio Centenario, Montevideo
Referee: (Bolivia) Ivo Méndez

=== Third-place match ===
24 February 2018
14:15

(Brazil) São Paulo	1–1	River Plate
Walce 90'	Report	Martín 21'
Penalties
	4–5

Estadio Centenario, Montevideo
Referee: (Venezuela) Alexis Herrera
