= Santucho =

Santucho is a surname. Notable people with the surname include:

- Carlos Santucho (born 1985), Uruguayan soccer player
- Mario Roberto Santucho (1936–1976), Argentine revolutionary and guerrilla combatant

== See also ==
- Diego Thomas de Santuchos (1549–1624), Spanish conquistador
