= Santiago Martín =

Santiago Martín may refer to:

== People ==
- James Martin Eder (1838–1921), also known as Santiago Martín Eder Kaiser, Colombian industrialist
- Santiago Martín Prado (born 1955), retired Spanish footballer
- Santiago Martín Rivas, Chilean military officer and member of Grupo Colina
- Santiago Martín Hondo Ndongo (born 1974), Equatoguinean footballer
- Santiago Martín Silva Olivera (born 1980), Uruguayan footballer
- Santiago Martín Maidana (born 1991), Spanish footballer
- Santiago Martín Pérez (born 1998), Uruguayan footballer
- Santiago Martín Paiva Mattos (born 1999), Uruguayan footballer
- El Viti (born 1938), nickname of Santiago Martín Sánchez, Spanish bullfighter

== Venues ==
- Pabellón Insular Santiago Martín, indoor arena in San Cristóbal de La Laguna, Spain

== See also ==
- Marty (rapper) (born 1987), American rapper, birth name Martin Lorenzo Santiago
