= Facundo Silva =

Facundo Silva may refer to:

- Facundo Silva (footballer, born 1991), Argentine footballer for Instituto ACC
- Facundo Silva (footballer, born 1996), Uruguayan footballer for Danubio F.C.
