= Alonso Gonzalez Calderón =

Alonso González Calderón

Mayordomo of Santa Fe Province
- In office 1676–1677
- Monarch: Charles II of Spain
- Preceded by: ?
- Succeeded by: ?

Personal details
- Born: c.1610 Santander, Spain
- Died: 1696 Santa Fe, Viceroyalty of Peru
- Spouse: Gerónima Cortés de Santuchos
- Occupation: Politician
- Profession: Army's officer

Military service
- Allegiance: Spanish Empire
- Branch/service: Spanish Army
- Rank: Captain

Alonso Gonzalez Calderón (c.1610-1696) was a Spanish Captain, who served during the Viceroyalty of Peru as regidor, and mayordomo of Santa Fe.

He was born in Santander, possibly son of Antonio Calderón, who served as alguazil of Santa Fe City in 1625. He was married to Gerónima Cortés granddaughter of Diego Thomas de Santuchos and Catalina Correa de Santa Ana.

His son Bartolomé Calderón, was married to María Robles descendant of Antonio Thomas (conquistador), born in Portugal.
