= Valentino Delgado =

Peruvian footballer (born 2006)

Personal information
- Full name: Antonio Valentino Delgado Calisaya
- Date of birth: 11 September 2006 (age 20)
- Place of birth: Lima, Peru
- Height: 1.75 m (5 ft 9 in)
- Position: Midfielder

Team information
- Current team: Cantolao
- Number: 24

Youth career
- Cantolao

Senior career*
Years	Team	Apps	(Gls)
2023–	Cantolao	9	(0)

International career
2023	Peru U17	3	(0)
- * Club domestic league appearances and goals as of 05:00, 11 October 2023 (UTC)

Antonio Valentino Delgado Calisaya (born 11 September 2006) is a Peruvian footballer who plays as a midfielder for Peruvian Primera División club Cantolao.

== Club career ==
Having progressed through the academy of Cantolao, he made his debut for the club on 4 February 2023 in a 4–0 loss to Universitario, coming on as a second-half substitute for Gabriel Leyes. In doing so, he was the youngest player to appear in Peruvian professional football in 2023. On 11 October 2023, he was named by English newspaper The Guardian as one of the best players born in 2006 worldwide.

== International career ==
Delgado has represented Peru at under-17 level.

== Career statistics ==
=== Club ===
As of 11 October 2023.

Appearances and goals by club, season and competition
Club	Season	League			Cup		Continental		Other		Total	
Club	Season	Division	Apps	Goals	Apps	Goals	Apps	Goals	Apps	Goals	Apps	Goals
Cantolao	2023	Peruvian Primera División	9	0	0	0	0	0	0	0	9	0
Career total			9	0	0	0	0	0	0	0	9	0
