= Esteban González =

Esteban González may refer to:

- Esteban González (footballer, born 1962), Argentine football striker
- Esteban González Pons (born 1964), Spanish politician
- Esteban González (footballer, born 1978), Argentine football midfielder
- Esteban González (Chilean footballer) (born 1982), Chilean football midfielder
- Esteban González (footballer, born 1991), Uruguayan football right-back
