= Gustavo Aprile =

Uruguayan footballer (born 1988)

Personal information
- Full name: Gustavo Javier Aprile Retta
- Date of birth: August 10, 1988 (age 38)
- Place of birth: Montevideo, Uruguay
- Height: 1.82 m (6 ft 0 in)
- Position: Midfielder

Senior career*
Years	Team	Apps	(Gls)
2009–2011	Racing Club	15	(0)
2011–2012	Bella Vista	23	(0)
2012–2013	Bari	5	(0)
2013–2014	Cerro Largo	17	(1)
2014	Rampla	13	(2)
2015	Temperley	22	(1)
2015–2017	Liverpool	47	(4)
2017	Guillermo Brown	10	(0)
2018	Atenas	9	(0)
2019	Massese	6	(0)
2019	Juventude	16	(0)
2021	Villa Española	11	(0)
- * Club domestic league appearances and goals

Gustavo Javier Aprile Retta (born August 10, 1988) is an Uruguayan footballer who plays as a midfielder. He has played for clubs in Italy, Argentina, Mexico and Brazil as well as his native Uruguay.
