= William Machado (Uruguayan footballer) =

Uruguayan footballer

Personal information
- Full name: William Floricio Machado Caetano
- Date of birth: 31 May 1994 (age 32)
- Place of birth: Treinta y Tres, Uruguay
- Height: 1.73 m (5 ft 8 in)
- Position: Midfielder

Team information
- Current team: Unión Española
- Number: 5

Youth career
- Bella Vista
- 2014: Peñarol

Senior career*
Years	Team	Apps	(Gls)
2012–2013	Bella Vista	0	(0)
2014	Peñarol	2	(0)
2015–2016	Canadian	2	(0)
2018	Huracán FC	7	(0)
2019	Cerrito	7	(0)
2020–2021	Villa Española	20	(1)
2022	Arsenal de Sarandí	16	(1)
2023	Ferro Carril Oeste	27	(1)
2024	Deportivo Riestra	6	(0)
2024	Estudiantes RC	14	(0)
2025	Almirante Brown	25	(1)
2026–	Unión Española	2	(0)
- * Club domestic league appearances and goals as of 11 March 2026

William Floricio Machado Caetano (born 31 May 1994) is a Uruguayan professional footballer who plays as a midfielder for Chilean club Unión Española.

== Club career ==
Born in Treinta y Tres, Uruguay, Machado was trained at Bella Vista and was promoted to the first team in 2012. After a brief stint with Peñarol, he made his professional debut with Canadian in the 2015–16 season. After about three years as a free agent, played for Huracán FC, Cerrito and Villa Española in his homeland.

In 2022, Machado moved to Argentina and signed with Arsenal de Sarandí in the top division. In that country, he continued with Ferro Carril Oeste (2023), Deportivo Riestra (2024), Estudiantes de Río Cuarto (2024) and Almirante Brown (2025).

In January 2026, Machado moved to Chile and joined Unión Española.

== Personal life ==
A free agent for about three years since 2016, Machado worked in building, as a night watchman, seller, among other activities.
