= Gastón Vitancurt =

Uruguayan footballer (born 1997)

Personal information
- Full name: Gastón Nicolás Vitancurt Evora
- Date of birth: 26 February 1997 (age 29)
- Place of birth: Pan de Azúcar, Uruguay
- Height: 1.72 m (5 ft 8 in)
- Position: Midfielder

Youth career
- 2009–2019: Peñarol

Senior career*
| Years | Team | Apps | (Gls) |
| 2017–2018 | → Torque (loan) | 11 | (1) |
| 2019–2022 | Juventud | 24 | (1) |
| 2022–? | Piriápolis F.C. | | |
- * Club domestic league appearances and goals as of 01:03, 3 June 2023 (UTC)

Gastón Nicolás Vitancurt Evora (born 26 February 1997) is a Uruguayan footballer who plays as a midfielder.

== Career ==
Vitancurt began his youth career at Uruguayan club Peñarol, and was promoted to the first team ahead of the 2015–16 season. Vitancurt made his unofficial first-team debut in pre-season that year, appearing in a 1–0 victory over Juventud de Las Piedras. However, he would not make an official first-team appearance over the course of his stint with the club.

In 2017, Vitancurt was loaned out to Torque, late in the club's push for promotion. After making one appearance in the league in 2017, Vitancurt made his Primera División debut in the club's 2018 Apertura match against Nacional, coming on as an 81st-minute substitute for Taty Castellanos in a 4–2 defeat. He scored his first and only goal for the club later that season, netting late in a 2–1 defeat to Montevideo Wanderers.

In 2022, after a three-season stint with Juventud, Vitancurt appeared with Piriápolis F.C.

== Career statistics ==
=== Club ===
As of match played 23 November 2021

Appearances and goals by club, season and competition
| Club | Season | League | | | Cup | | Other | | Total | |
| Club | Season | Division | Apps | Goals | Apps | Goals | Apps | Goals | Apps | Goals |
|---|---|---|---|---|---|---|---|---|---|---|
| Torque (loan) | 2017 | Uruguayan Segunda División | 1 | 0 | — | | — | | 1 | 0 |
| Torque (loan) | 2018 | Uruguayan Primera División | 10 | 1 | — | | — | | 10 | 1 |
| Torque (loan) | Total | | 11 | 1 | — | | — | | 11 | 1 |
| Juventud | 2019 | Uruguayan Primera División | 6 | 1 | — | | — | | 6 | 1 |
| Juventud | 2020 | Uruguayan Segunda División | 10 | 0 | — | | 1 (Note: Appearance in the Uruguayan Segunda División promotion play-offs) | 0 | 11 | 0 |
| Juventud | 2021 | Uruguayan Segunda División | 8 | 0 | — | | — | | 8 | 0 |
| Juventud | Total | | 24 | 1 | — | | 1 | 0 | 25 | 1 |
| Career total | | | 35 | 2 | — | | 1 | 0 | 36 | 2 |
