= Jorge Graví =

Uruguayan footballer (born 1994)

Personal information
- Full name: Jorge Daniel Graví Piñeiro
- Date of birth: 16 January 1994 (age 32)
- Place of birth: Treinta y Tres, Uruguay
- Height: 1.85 m (6 ft 1 in)
- Position: Winger

Team information
- Current team: Plaza Colonia (on loan from Danubio)
- Number: 7

Youth career
- Danubio

Senior career*
Years	Team	Apps	(Gls)
2014–2019	Danubio	69	(6)
2018	→ Córdoba B (loan)	9	(0)
2019–	Cerro Largo	14	(1)
2019	→ Juventud (loan)	13	(0)
2020–	→ Plaza Colonia (loan)	1	(0)
- * Club domestic league appearances and goals as of 20:58, 2 August 2020 (UTC)

Jorge Daniel Graví Piñeiro (born 16 January 1994) is an Uruguayan footballer who plays for Plaza Colonia on loan from Cerro Largo as a right winger.

== Club career ==
Born in Treinta y Tres, Graví finished his formation with Danubio, and was promoted to the main squad in 2014. He made his first team – and Primera División – debut on 15 February 2015, starting in a 1–0 away win against Racing Montevideo.

Graví scored his first goal for the club on 19 September 2015, netting the opener in a 1–1 home draw against Sud América. He would subsequently feature more regularly for the side in the following campaigns.

On 27 January 2018, Graví and fellow Danubio teammate Emiliano Ghan joined Córdoba CF on loan for six months, being immediately assigned to the reserves in Segunda División B.

On 29 January 2019, Graví was loaned out again, this time to Cerro Largo for the rest of 2019.
