= Emiliano Ghan =

Uruguayan footballer (born 1995)

Personal information
- Full name: Emiliano Michael Ghan Carranza
- Date of birth: 5 June 1995 (age 31)
- Place of birth: Canelones, Uruguay
- Height: 1.78 m (5 ft 10 in)
- Position: Midfielder

Team information
- Current team: Villa Española
- Number: 7

Youth career
- Danubio

Senior career*
Years	Team	Apps	(Gls)
2014–2020	Danubio	46	(3)
2016	→ Villa Española (loan)	10	(1)
2018	→ Córdoba B (loan)	5	(0)
2020	Atenas	0	(0)
2021–	Villa Española	11	(0)

International career
2015	Uruguay U20	2	(0)
- * Club domestic league appearances and goals as of 19:22, 2 September 2021 (UTC)

Emiliano Michael Ghan Carranza (born 5 June 1995) is an Uruguayan footballer who plays for Villa Española as a midfielder.

== Club career ==
Ghan was born in Canelones, and was a Danubio youth graduate. He made his first team debut on 21 August 2014, starting in a 1–3 Copa Sudamericana away loss against Deportivo Capiatá.

Ghan made his Primera División debut on 15 February 2015, playing the full 90 minutes in a 1–0 away win against Racing Montevideo. In January 2016, after being rarely used, he was loaned to Segunda División side Villa Española, for six months.

After achieving promotion to the main category, Ghan returned to Danubio in June 2016. He scored his first goal for the club on 25 September of that year, netting the last in a 3–0 home win against Plaza Colonia.

On 27 January 2018, Ghan and fellow Danubio teammate Jorge Graví joined Córdoba CF on loan for six months, being immediately assigned to the reserves in Segunda División B.
