= Juan Pintado =

Uruguayan football player (born 1997)

Personal information
- Full name: Juan de Dios Pintado Leines
- Date of birth: 28 July 1997 (age 29)
- Place of birth: Las Piedras, Uruguay
- Height: 1.73 m (5 ft 8 in)
- Positions: Right-back; right winger

Team information
- Current team: Unión Santa Fe (on loan from Gimnasia LP)
- Number: 15

Youth career
- 2013–2015: Juventud

Senior career*
Years	Team	Apps	(Gls)
2015–2024	Juventud	117	(4)
2020	→ Goiás (loan)	18	(0)
2022–2023	→ Godoy Cruz (loan)	20	(0)
2023	→ Defensor Sporting (loan)	36	(1)
2024–	Gimnasia LP	72	(0)
2026	→ Nacional (loan)	7	(0)
2026–	→ Unión Santa Fe (loan)	13	(0)
- * Club domestic league appearances and goals as of 17:27, 22 November 2026 (UTC)

Juan de Dios Pintado Leines (born 28 July 1997) is a Uruguayan footballer who plays as a right-back or right winger for Unión Santa Fe, on loan from Gimnasia La Plata.

== Career ==
=== Juventud ===
==== Goiás (loan) ====
on 13 January 2020 Campeonato Brasileiro Série A club Goiás signed Pintado on loan from Juventud.

== Career statistics ==
=== Club ===
As of 9 September 2020.

Club	Season	League			Cup		Continental		Other		Total	
Club	Season	Division	Apps	Goals	Apps	Goals	Apps	Goals	Apps	Goals	Apps	Goals
Juventud	2015–16	Primera División	4	0	–		0	0	–		4	0
Juventud	2016	Primera División	13	0	–		–		–		13	0
Juventud	2017	Primera División	18	0	–		–		–		18	0
Juventud	2018	Segunda División	26	0	–		–		–		26	0
Juventud	2019	Primera División	35	1	–		–		–		35	1
Juventud	Total		96	1	0	0	0	0	0	0	96	1
Goiás (loan)	2020	Série A	7	0	4	0	2 (Note: Appearance(s) in the Copa Sudamericana.)	0	4 (Note: Appearance(s) in the Campeonato Goiano.)	0	17	0
Career total			103	1	4	0	2	0	4	0	113	1
