= Steve Makuka =

Uruguayan footballer (born 1994)

Personal information
- Full name: Steve Eduardo Makuka Pereyra
- Date of birth: 26 November 1994 (age 31)
- Place of birth: Montevideo, Uruguay
- Height: 1.80 m (5 ft 11 in)
- Position: Centre-back

Team information
- Current team: Miramar Misiones

Senior career*
Years	Team	Apps	(Gls)
–2015	River Plate		
2015	Torque		
2015–2017	Huracán	28	(5)
2016	→ Progreso (loan)	9	(1)
2017–2019	Progreso	49	(0)
2019	Liverpool	10	(0)
2019–2021	Atlético Bucaramanga	34	(0)
2021–2023	Municipal	103	(3)
2024–	Miramar Misiones	0	(0)
- * Club domestic league appearances and goals as of 14 May 2023

Steve Eduardo Makuka Pereyra (born 26 November 1994) is an Uruguayan professional footballer who plays as a defender for Miramar Misiones.
