= Guillermo Fratta =

Uruguayan footballer (born 1995)

Personal information
- Full name: Guillermo Fratta Cabrera
- Date of birth: 19 September 1995 (age 31)
- Place of birth: Rocha, Uruguay
- Height: 1.88 m (6 ft 2 in)
- Position: Centre-back

Team information
- Current team: Deportivo Táchira
- Number: 4

Youth career
- Palermo Rocha
- Defensor Sporting

Senior career*
Years	Team	Apps	(Gls)
2015–2017	Defensor Sporting	13	(1)
2016–2017	→ Boston River (loan)	45	(5)
2018–2020	Boston River	66	(7)
2020–2023	Rentistas	19	(0)
2021–2022	→ Gimnasia LP (loan)	25	(2)
2023	Fénix	15	(1)
2023–2024	Deportivo Cuenca	24	(3)
2024	Danubio	14	(1)
2025	Montevideo City Torque	19	(2)
2026–	Deportivo Táchira	4	(2)

International career
2015	Uruguay U20	2	(0)
- * Club domestic league appearances and goals as of 10 March 2026

Guillermo Fratta Cabrera (born 19 September 1995) is a Uruguayan professional footballer who plays as a centre-back for Liga FUTVE club Deportivo Táchira.

== Career ==
A youth academy graduate of Defensor Sporting, Fratta made his professional debut on 6 September 2015 in a 3–2 league win against rivals Danubio. Playing whole 90 minutes in the match, he opened his team's tally with a goal in fourth minute. He made his continental debut on 2 October 2015 in a 0–0 draw against Argentine side Lanús.

Fratta joined Boston River on loan prior to 2016 season.

== Personal life ==
Guillermo's younger brother Mauricio is also a professional footballer.

== Career statistics ==
=== Club ===
As of 1 April 2021

Club	Season	League			Cup		Continental		Other		Total	
Club	Season	Division	Apps	Goals	Apps	Goals	Apps	Goals	Apps	Goals	Apps	Goals
Defensor Sporting	2015–16	Uruguayan Primera División	13	1	—		3 (Note: Appearance(s) in Copa Sudamericana.)	0	—		16	1
Boston River (loan)	2016	Uruguayan Primera División	14	3	—		—		—		14	3
Boston River (loan)	2017	Uruguayan Primera División	31	2	—		4	1	—		35	3
Boston River (loan)	Total		45	5	0	0	4	1	0	0	49	6
Boston River	2018	Uruguayan Primera División	23	2	—		1	0	—		24	2
Boston River	2019	Uruguayan Primera División	30	4	—		—		—		30	4
Boston River	2020	Uruguayan Primera División	13	1	—		—		—		13	1
Boston River	Total		66	7	0	0	1	0	0	0	67	7
Rentistas	2020	Uruguayan Primera División	15	0	—		—		1 (Note: Appearance in Primera División championship playoff.)	0	16	0
Career total			139	13	0	0	8	1	1	0	148	14
