= José Alberti =

Uruguayan football player (born 1997)

Personal information
- Full name: José Alberti Loyarte
- Date of birth: 29 March 1997 (age 29)
- Place of birth: Las Piedras, Uruguay
- Height: 1.72 m (5 ft 8 in)
- Position: Right midfielder

Team information
- Current team: Jeonnam Dragons
- Number: 16

Youth career
- 2011–2016: Juventud

Senior career*
| Years | Team | Apps | (Gls) |
| 2016–2019 | Juventud | 99 | (10) |
| 2020–2023 | Boston River | 100 | (6) |
| 2023 | → Emelec (loan) | 11 | (0) |
| 2023 | Nacional | 7 | (0) |
| 2024 | Montevideo Wanderers | 33 | (2) |
| 2025– | Jeonnam Dragons | 38 | (3) |
- * Club domestic league appearances and goals as of 6 January 2026

José Alberti Loyarte (born 29 March 1997) is a Uruguayan footballer who plays as a midfielder for South Korean club Jeonnam Dragons.

== Career ==
=== Juventud de Las Piedras ===
Born in Las Piedras, Alberti began his pro career with hometown club Juventud after spending a number of years within the club's youth ranks. He made his league debut for the club in August 2016, playing the entirety of a 2–0 victory over Sud América. Against the same club the following year, he scored his first competitive goal for the club, scoring a late equalizer to secure a 2–2 draw. Alberti would spend four seasons with the club's first-team roster before departing prior to the 2020 season.

=== Boston River ===
Following Juventud's relegation at the end of the 2019 season, Alberti pivoted to Boston River and remained in the Uruguayan Primera División. He made his debut for the club just days after joining in February, appearing in Boston River's opening day victory over Deportivo Maldonado. He scored his first goal for the club later that season, netting a brace in a 5–1 victory over Deportivo Maldonado in October 2020. Through three seasons, he registered 100 total league appearances for the club. However, following the 2022 season and a potential move to Nacional falling through, Alberti stated his desires to move abroad for the sake of his career.

=== Emelec (loan) ===
In January 2023, Alberti moved on loan to Ecuadorian club Emelec, embarking on a one-year loan with an option to buy. Upon arrival at the club, Alberti commented on the club's expectations to win a title in 2023, which they'd failed to accomplish since 2017. He made his competitive debut in the club's opening match of the season, a 2–0 victory over Libertad.
