= Sergio Felipe =

Uruguayan footballer (born 1991)

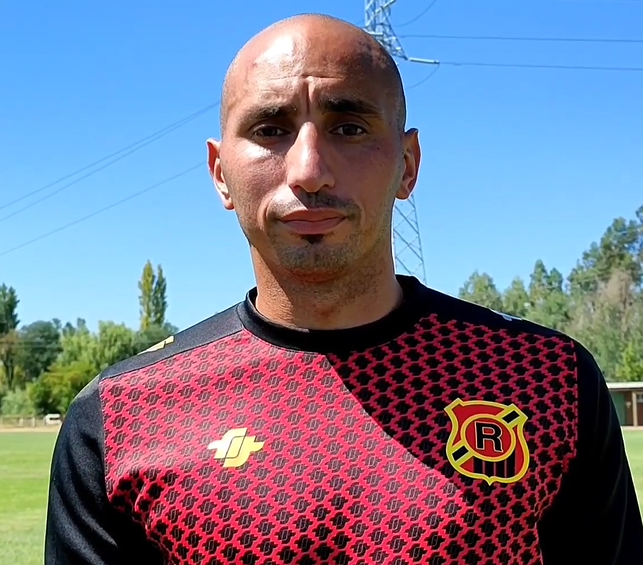
- Felipe with Rangers in 2022

Personal information
- Full name: Sergio Andrés Felipe Silva
- Date of birth: February 21, 1991 (age 35)
- Place of birth: Montevideo, Uruguay
- Height: 1.78 m (5 ft 10 in)
- Position: Centre-back

Team information
- Current team: Santiago Wanderers

Youth career
- Estrella del Sur
- Liverpool Montevideo
- La Mákina del Sur
- Danubio

Senior career*
Years	Team	Apps	(Gls)
2012	La Luz	–	(–)
2013–2016	El Tanque Sisley	27	(0)
2015	→ Villa Española (loan)	6	(0)
2016	Villa Española	13	(1)
2017	Sud América	36	(4)
2018–2019	Danubio	58	(4)
2020	Palestino	14	(0)
2021	Coquimbo Unido	23	(2)
2022–2024	Rangers	81	(5)
2025–	Santiago Wanderers	0	(0)
- * Club domestic league appearances and goals as of 12 December 2024

Sergio Andrés Felipe Silva (born February 21, 1991) is an Uruguayan footballer who plays as a defender for Chilean club Santiago Wanderers.

== Career ==
As a youth player, Felipe's quit competitive football until his brother recovered from a coma.

For 2020, he signed for Chilean side Palestino from Danubio in the Uruguayan top flight. After, he joined Primera B club Coquimbo Unido for 2021 season.

Felipe signed with Santiago Wanderers for the 2025 season.

== Honours ==
Coquimbo Unido

- Primera B (1): 2021
