= Mathías Riquero =

Uruguayan footballer (born 1982)

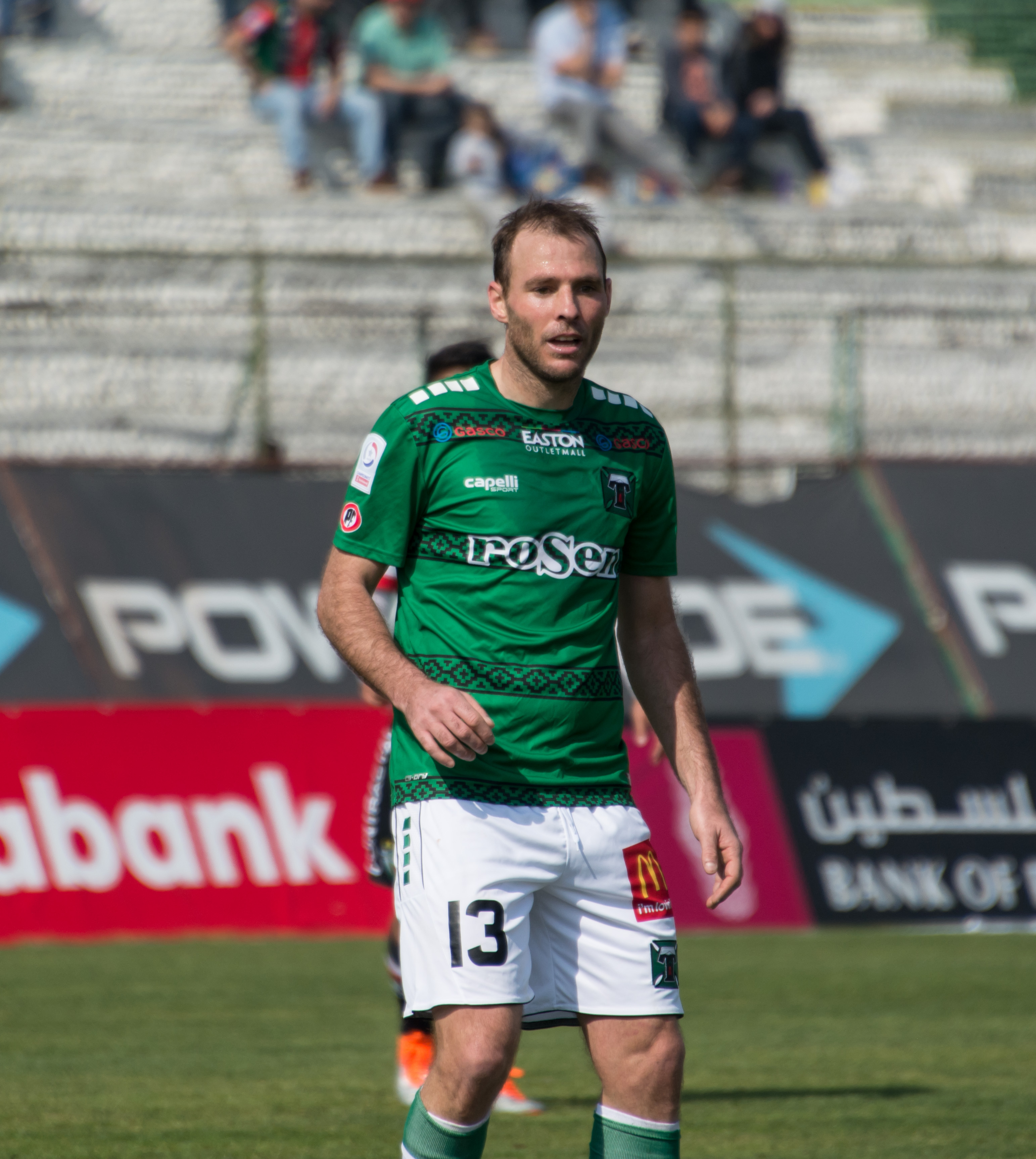
- Riquero in 2018

Personal information
- Full name: Mathías Damián Riquero Berretta
- Date of birth: 29 August 1982 (age 44)
- Place of birth: Montevideo, Uruguay
- Height: 1.81 m (5 ft 11 in)
- Position: Midfielder

Youth career
- Defensor Sporting
- Nacional
- Villa Española

Senior career*
Years	Team	Apps	(Gls)
2001–2003	Villa Española	64	(6)
2004–2005	Montevideo Wanderers	81	(5)
2006	Cerro	14	(2)
2006–2008	Progreso	79	(8)
2008	Atlético Junior	12	(1)
2009	Caxias do Sul	3	(1)
2009–2010	Liverpool	27	(4)
2010–2011	Danubio	26	(2)
2011–2015	Ñublense	139	(20)
2015–2017	Deportes Iquique	55	(12)
2017–2018	Deportes Temuco	43	(6)
2019–2021	Progreso	51	(10)
2021	Villa Española	26	(2)
- * Club domestic league appearances and goals

Mathías Damián Riquero Berretta (born 29 August 1982) is an Uruguayan naturalized Chilean former professional footballer who played as a defensive midfielder.

== Career ==
With an extensive career, Riquero played for clubs in Uruguay, Colombia, Brazil and Chile. As a youth player, Riquero was with Defensor Sporting and Nacional before making his professional debut at the age of sixteen playing for Villa Española.

He retired at the end of the 2021 season. His last club was Villa Española in the Uruguayan top division.

== Personal life ==
His brother, Gonzalo, played as a goalkeeper for Villa Española when Mathías made his professional debut.

Riquero naturalized Chilean by residence in 2017.
