= Carlos Santucho =

Uruguayan footballer (born 1985)

Personal information
- Full name: Carlos Daniel Santucho Gradiol
- Date of birth: 12 March 1985 (age 41)
- Place of birth: Nueva Helvecia, Uruguay
- Height: 1.92 m (6 ft 4 in)
- Position: Defender

Senior career*
Years	Team	Apps	(Gls)
2005–2010	Liverpool Montevideo	44	(1)
2007	→ Durazno (loan)	11	(1)
2010	→ Durazno (loan)	3	(0)
2010	→ Deportivo Armenio (loan)	0	(0)
2011	Universidad de Concepción	14	(0)
2013	El Tanque Sisley	14	(0)
2014	Olmedo	29	(0)
2015	Rampla Juniors	7	(1)
2015	Foligno	3	(0)
2016	El Tanque Sisley	4	(0)
2017	Torque	5	(0)
2018	Juventud Las Piedras	24	(0)
2019	Sud América	23	(1)
2020–2021	La Luz FC	11	(2)
2021	Villa Española	19	(0)
2022–2023	Juventud Las Piedras	35	(1)
- * Club domestic league appearances and goals

Carlos Daniel Santucho Gradiol (born March 12, 1985) is a Uruguayan former professional footballer who played as a defender.

== Teams ==
- (Uruguay) Liverpool 2005–2006
- (Uruguay) Durazno 2007
- (Uruguay) Liverpool 2007–2010
- (Uruguay) Durazno 2010
- (Argentina) Deportivo Armenio 2010
- (Chile) Universidad de Concepción 2011
- (Uruguay) El Tanque Sisley 2013
- (Ecuador) Olmedo 2014
- (Uruguay) Rampla Juniors 2015
- (Italy) Foligno 2015
- (Uruguay) El Tanque Sisley 2016
- (Uruguay) Torque 2017
- (Uruguay) Juventud Las Piedras 2018
- (Uruguay) Sud América 2019
- (Uruguay) La Luz FC 2020–2021
- (Uruguay) Villa Española 2022
- (Uruguay) Juventud Las Piedras 2022–2023
