= Facundo Silva (footballer, born 1996) =

Uruguayan footballer

Personal information
- Full name: Facundo Ariel Silva Scheeffer
- Date of birth: 4 July 1996 (age 30)
- Place of birth: Artigas, Uruguay
- Height: 1.90 m (6 ft 3 in)
- Position: Goalkeeper

Team information
- Current team: Villa Española
- Number: 1

Senior career*
Years	Team	Apps	(Gls)
2015–2020	Danubio	12	(0)
2017	→ Canadian (loan)	17	(0)
2020	→ Villa Española (loan)	22	(0)
2021–	Villa Española	15	(1)

International career
- Uruguay U15
2012–2013	Uruguay U17	15	(0)
- * Club domestic league appearances and goals as of 01:25, 26 December 2020 (UTC)

Facundo Ariel Silva Scheeffer (born 4 July 1996) is a Uruguayan professional footballer who plays as a goalkeeper for C.S.D. Villa Española.

== Club career ==
Silva's career started with Danubio. He was promoted into the club's first-team for the 2014–15 campaign, he failed to make an appearance but was an unused substitute fifteen times as Danubio placed 4th overall. He was unused another nineteen times throughout 2015–16, but Silva did eventually make his professional debut during a 2–1 defeat to Sud América on 19 March 2016. In January 2017, Silva joined Segunda División team Canadian on loan. He featured seventeen times as Canadian were relegated to the Segunda División Amateur. Back with Danubio, Silva appeared in nine games across 2018.

In March 2020, after no more appearances for Danubio, Silva was loaned to second tier team Villa Española. His debut arrived, belatedly due to the COVID-19 pandemic, in August against Albion.

== International career ==
Silva has represented Uruguay at U15 and U17 level. He won fifteen caps for the U17s, including his debut in a friendly against Paraguay in May 2012 and one appearance at the 2013 South American Under-17 Football Championship in Argentina; playing the full ninety minutes in a 5–1 first stage victory over Bolivia. He was a substitute for the U17s' other eight U17 Championship fixtures, as well as for five games at the subsequent 2013 FIFA U-17 World Cup in the United Arab Emirates.

== Career statistics ==
As of 19 August 2020.

Club statistics
Club	Season	League			Cup		League Cup		Continental		Other		Total	
Club	Season	Division	Apps	Goals	Apps	Goals	Apps	Goals	Apps	Goals	Apps	Goals	Apps	Goals
Danubio	2014–15	Primera División	0	0	—		—		0	0	0	0	0	0
Danubio	2015–16	Primera División	3	0	—		—		0	0	0	0	3	0
Danubio	2016	Primera División	0	0	—		—		—		0	0	0	0
Danubio	2017	Primera División	0	0	—		—		0	0	0	0	0	0
Danubio	2018	Primera División	9	0	—		—		0	0	0	0	9	0
Danubio	2019	Primera División	0	0	—		—		0	0	0	0	0	0
Danubio	2020	Primera División	0	0	—		—		—		0	0	0	0
Danubio	Total		12	0	—		—		0	0	0	0	12	0
Canadian (loan)	2017	Segunda División	17	0	—		—		—		0	0	17	0
Villa Española (loan)	2020	Segunda División	2	0	—		—		—		0	0	2	0
Career total			31	0	—		—		0	0	0	0	31	0
