= Maxi Pérez =

Uruguayan footballer (born 1995)

Personal information
- Full name: Elbio Maximiliano Pérez Azambuya
- Date of birth: 8 May 1995 (age 31)
- Place of birth: Lagomar, Uruguay
- Height: 1.85 m (6 ft 1 in)
- Position: Striker

Team information
- Current team: Cerro
- Number: 14

Senior career*
Years	Team	Apps	(Gls)
2016	Defensor Sporting	0	(0)
2017–2019	Boston River	52	(12)
2020	Alianza Petrolera	11	(2)
2021	Boston River	4	(0)
2022	Miramar Misiones	28	(7)
2023	Universidad de Concepción	24	(6)
2024	Marathón	15	(1)
2024–	Cerro	2	(1)
- * Club domestic league appearances and goals as of 14 September 2024

Elbio Maximiliano Pérez Azambuya (born 8 May 1995) is a Uruguayan footballer who plays as a striker for Cerro.

== Early life ==
He is a native of Lagomar, Uruguay. He played for the Uruguay national under-15 football team at a tournament in France.

== Career ==
He started his career with Uruguayan side Defensor Sporting. He was described as "did not have space in a team where Brian Lozano and Giorgian De Arrascaeta, among others, stood out". In 2017, he signed for Uruguayan side Boston River. In 2020, he signed for Colombian side Alianza Petrolera. In 2021, he returned to Uruguayan side Boston River. In 2022, he signed for Uruguayan side Miramar Misiones. In 2023, he signed for Chilean side Universidad de Concepción. In 2024, he signed for Honduran side Marathón.

== Style of play ==
He mainly operates as a striker. He has been described as a "strong '9' in the area, with presence in the area, good movements".
