= Sebastián Píriz =

Uruguayan footballer (born 1990)

Personal information
- Full name: Sebastián Gerardo Píriz Ribas
- Date of birth: 4 March 1990 (age 36)
- Place of birth: Montevideo, Uruguay
- Height: 1.86 m (6 ft 1 in)
- Position: Defensive midfielder

Team information
- Current team: River Plate
- Number: 20

Senior career*
Years	Team	Apps	(Gls)
2010–2012	Danubio	37	(2)
2012–2015	Peñarol	69	(8)
2016	Tigre	8	(0)
2016	Al-Shabab	2	(0)
2017	Emelec	14	(0)
2018	Liverpool	20	(1)
2018	Panionios	6	(0)
2019–2021	River Plate	57	(5)
- * Club domestic league appearances and goals as of 7 September 2019

Sebastián Gerardo Píriz Ribas (born 4 March 1990, in Montevideo) is a Uruguayan footballer who plays as a central midfielder for River Plate in Montevideo.
