= Adrián Leites =

Uruguayan footballer (born 1992)

Personal information
- Full name: Adrián Eloys Leites López
- Date of birth: 8 February 1992 (age 34)
- Place of birth: Montevideo, Uruguay
- Height: 1.78 m (5 ft 10 in)
- Position: Midfielder

Team information
- Current team: Rampla Juniors
- Number: 21

Youth career
- Cerro

Senior career*
Years	Team	Apps	(Gls)
2013–2015	Cerro	4	(0)
2014–2015	Villa Teresa	13	(2)
2015–2017	Rampla Juniors	58	(16)
2018	Deportes Melipilla	2	(0)
2018	Rampla Juniors	10	(1)
2018–2019	Cobán Imperial	21	(2)
2019–2022	River Plate	72	(8)
2022	Cerrito	6	(0)
2023–	Rampla Juniors	38	(3)

International career^{‡}
2014–2015	Uruguay U15	26	(8)
2016–2017	Uruguay U17	19	(8)
2018	Uruguay U20	9	(2)
- * Club domestic league appearances and goals as of 14 September 2024 ‡ National team caps and goals as of 4 August 2018

Adrián Eloys Leites López (born 8 February 1992) is a Uruguayan footballer who plays as a midfielder for Primera División club Rampla Juniors.
