= Emanuel Hernández =

Uruguayan footballer

Personal information
- Full name: Juan Emanuel Hernández Rodríguez
- Date of birth: 30 October 1997 (age 29)
- Place of birth: Montevideo, Uruguay
- Height: 1.91 m (6 ft 3 in)
- Position: Centre-back

Team information
- Current team: Olimpia
- Number: 2

Youth career
- 2005–2009: Danubio
- 2010–2014: Nacional
- 2014–2015: Miramar Misiones
- 2015–2018: River Plate Montevideo

Senior career*
Years	Team	Apps	(Gls)
2019	River Plate Montevideo	9	(0)
2020–2021	Jaguares de Córdoba	11	(0)
2021	Sud América	8	(0)
2021–2022	Danubio	44	(6)
2023–2025	Sarmiento de Junín	30	(0)
2024	→ Cobresal (loan)	14	(0)
2025–	Olimpia	19	(3)
- * Club domestic league appearances and goals as of 25 May 2025

Juan Emanuel Hernández Rodríguez (born 30 October 1997), known as Emanuel Hernández, is a Uruguayan professional footballer who plays as a centre-back for Honduran Liga Nacional club Olimpia.

== Career ==
As a youth player, Hernández was with Danubio, Nacional and Miramar Misiones before joining River Plate de Montevideo in 2015. He made his professional debut with River Plate in the 2–2 draw against Fénix on 14 April 2019. The next year, he moved to Colombia and signed with Jaguares de Córdoba in the top division.

After suffering a serious meniscus tear, Hernández returned to Uruguay and joined Sud América in 2021. In the same year, he switched to Danubio in the second level and got promotion to the Primera División.

In 2023, Hernández moved to Argentina and joined Sarmiento de Junín. In the second half of 2024, he was loaned out to Cobresal in the Chilean Primera División.

In 2025, he joined Honduran club C.D. Olimpia as a part of new manager Eduardo Espinel squad
