= Martín Amuz =

Uruguayan footballer (born 1997)

Personal information
- Date of birth: 21 April 1997 (age 29)
- Place of birth: Toronto, Ontario, Canada
- Height: 1.87 m (6 ft 2 in)
- Position: Centre-back

Team information
- Current team: Villa Española
- Number: 33

Youth career
- 2010–2015: Danubio

Senior career*
Years	Team	Apps	(Gls)
2015–2020	Danubio	19	(0)
2021–	Villa Española	14	(0)

International career
2015	Uruguay U18	7	(1)
- * Club domestic league appearances and goals as of 23 April 2024

Martín Amuz (born 21 April 1997) is a professional footballer who plays as a centre-back for Uruguayan Primera División club C.S.D. Villa Española. Born in Canada, he has represented Uruguay at youth level.

== Club career ==
=== Danubio ===
Amuz joined the academy of Danubio in 2010. He made his professional debut on 6 March 2016, in a 0–2 loss to Fénix.

=== Villa Española ===
In April 2021, Amuz joined Villa Española of the Uruguayan Primera División. He made his debut with the club on 29 May 2021 against Plaza Colonia.

== Personal life and career ==
Born in Canada and raised in Uruguay, Amuz is of Uruguayan descent. He represented Uruguay at under-18 level.
