= Facundo Vigo =

Uruguayan footballer (born 1999)

Personal information
- Full name: Facundo Vigo González
- Date of birth: 22 May 1999 (age 27)
- Place of birth: Montevideo, Uruguay
- Height: 1.84 m (6 ft 0 in)
- Position: Attacking midfielder

Team information
- Current team: Atenas

Youth career
- 2013–2015: River Plate

Senior career*
Years	Team	Apps	(Gls)
2015–2022	River Plate	27	(0)
2022	→ Juventud (loan)	19	(1)
2023–2026	Juventud	43	(4)
2026–	Atenas	0	(0)

International career
2018	Uruguay U20	5	(0)
- * Club domestic league appearances and goals as of 15 March 2026

Facundo Vigo González (born May 22, 1999) is a Uruguayan professional footballer who plays as an attacking midfielder forAtenas in the Uruguayan Segunda División.

== Club career ==
Vigo started his career playing with River Plate. He made his professional debut on 5th of December during the 2015/16 season, he played 25 minutes and he did it very well

== Honours ==
Uruguay U20

- South American Games silver medal: 2018
