= Santiago Paiva =

Uruguayan footballer (born 1999)

Personal information
- Full name: Santiago Martín Paiva Mattos
- Date of birth: 11 January 1999 (age 27)
- Place of birth: Montevideo, Uruguay
- Height: 1.80 m (5 ft 11 in)
- Position: Striker

Team information
- Current team: Manta
- Number: 29

Youth career
- Danubio

Senior career*
Years	Team	Apps	(Gls)
2017–2022	Danubio	69	(14)
2021	→ Cerro Largo (loan)	19	(3)
2022–2023	Godoy Cruz	2	(0)
2023	→ Arsenal de Sarandí (loan)	8	(0)
2023	Plaza Colonia	13	(0)
2024–	Manta	27	(2)
- * Club domestic league appearances and goals as of 29 October 2024

Santiago Martín Paiva Mattos (born 11 January 1999) is a Uruguayan professional footballer who plays as a striker for Ecuadorian club Manta.

== Career ==
Paiva made his professional debut on 26 November 2017, coming on as a 62nd minute substitute for Ignacio González in a 5–0 loss against Liverpool Montevideo. On 5 May 2019, he scored his first two professional goals in a 4–3 win against Juventud. After trailing 2–3 till 65th minute, Paiva scored equalizing and winning goals to give his side all three points.

Following Danubio's relegation from top division after 2020 season, Paiva joined Cerro Largo on a season long loan deal.

In July 2022, Paiva joined Argentine Primera División club Godoy Cruz.

== Career statistics ==
=== Club ===
As of 29 October 2024

Appearances and goals by club, season and competition
Club	Season	League			Cup		Continental		Total	
Club	Season	Division	Apps	Goals	Apps	Goals	Apps	Goals	Apps	Goals
Danubio	Uruguayan Primera División	2017	1	0	—		—		1	0
Danubio	Uruguayan Primera División	2018	2	0	—		0	0	2	0
Danubio	Uruguayan Primera División	2019	25	9	—		0	0	25	9
Danubio	Uruguayan Primera División	2020	31	5	—		—		31	5
Danubio	Uruguayan Primera División	2022	10	0	—		—		10	0
Danubio	Total		69	14	0	0	0	0	69	14
Cerro Largo	Uruguayan Primera División	2021	19	3	—		—		19	3
Godoy Cruz	Argentine Primera División	2022	2	0	1	0	—		3	0
Arsenal de Sarandí	Argentine Primera División	2023	8	0	0	0	—		8	0
Manta	Ecuadorian Serie B	2024	27	2	1	0	—		28	2
Career total			127	19	2	0	0	0	129	19
