= Mauricio Loffreda =

Uruguayan footballer (born 1990)

Personal information
- Full name: Mauricio Loffreda Zinula
- Date of birth: 29 October 1990 (age 35)
- Place of birth: Pando, Uruguay
- Height: 1.75 m (5 ft 9 in)
- Position: Left-back

Team information
- Current team: Cooper
- Number: 25

Senior career*
Years	Team	Apps	(Gls)
2013–2016	Huracán	59	(1)
2016–2017	Villa Teresa	9	(0)
2017–2020	Progreso	117	(1)
2021	Liverpool Montevideo	22	(1)
2022	Atenas	14	(0)
2023	Sud América	26	(0)
2024–	Cooper	15	(0)
- * Club domestic league appearances and goals as of 17 August 2024

Mauricio Loffreda Zinula (born 29 October 1990) is a Uruguayan footballer who plays as a defender for Cooper in the Uruguayan Segunda División.
