= Matías Alonso =

Uruguayan footballer (born 1985)

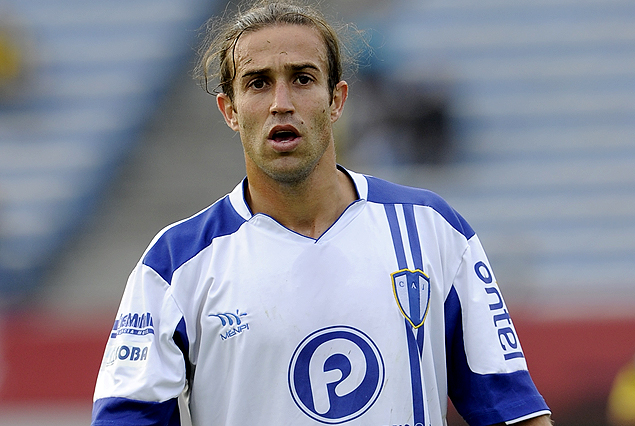
- Alonso with Juventud in 2015

Personal information
- Full name: Matías Damián Alonso Vallejo
- Date of birth: 16 April 1985 (age 41)
- Place of birth: Montevideo, Uruguay
- Height: 1.78 m (5 ft 10 in)
- Position: Forward

Senior career*
Years	Team	Apps	(Gls)
2003–2005	River Plate Montevideo	22	(6)
2005–2006	Peñarol	4	(0)
2006–2007	Celta B	33	(7)
2007–2010	Murcia	5	(0)
2007–2008	→ SE Ibiza (loan)	37	(14)
2008–2010	Murcia B	58	(14)
2010–2012	Granada	0	(0)
2011	→ Cerro (loan)	13	(4)
2011–2012	→ Zamora (loan)	13	(4)
2012	Beijing Technology	26	(5)
2013	Juventud	15	(11)
2013	Bari	7	(0)
2014–2015	Defensor	24	(6)
2015–2016	Juventud	14	(4)
2016–2017	The Strongest	69	(20)
2018–2021	River Plate Montevideo	72	(13)
2021–2023	Uruguay Montevideo	71	(15)
Total		483	(123)

International career
2005	Uruguay U20	4	(0)

Managerial career
- 2025: Uruguay U17
- * Club domestic league appearances and goals

Matías Damián Alonso Vallejo (Spanish pronunciation: [maˈti.as aˈlonso]; born 16 April 1985) is a Uruguayan former professional footballer who played as a forward. He is currently a manager.

== Playing career ==
Born in Montevideo, Alonso started his career at local Club Atlético River Plate, signing with Peñarol in 2005 and not being successful at either club. He moved to Spain subsequently, first with RC Celta de Vigo's reserves in the country's Segunda División B.

Alonso joined Real Murcia CF in 2007, being immediately loaned to another team in the third division, SE Ibiza-Eivissa. He appeared rarely for the main squad after returning, spending most of his spell with the B side.

After Murcia's relegation from Segunda División, Alonso joined Granada CF in July 2010. In the following transfer window, without having made any official appearances for the Andalusians, he returned to his country, signing with C.A. Cerro on loan.

On 1 September 2011, Alonso agreed to a one-year loan at Zamora CF in Spain's third tier. In February 2013, following a brief spell in China, he returned to his homeland and joined Juventud de Las Piedras.

Alonso moved abroad again in September 2013, signing with A.S. Bari of the Serie B. Just three months later, however, he left Italy and moved to Defensor Sporting.

== Coaching career ==
On 10 January 2025, Alonso was named as the new manager of the Uruguay under-17 team.

== Personal life ==
Alonso's older brother, Iván, was also a footballer and a forward. He too began his career at River Plate.

His cousin, Diego Alonso, also played several years in Spain.
