= C.S.D. Villa Española =

Uruguayan football club

Villa Española
- Full name: Club Social y Deportivo Villa Española
- Nickname: El Villa
- Founded: August 18, 1940; 86 years ago
- Ground: Estadio Obdulio Varela; Montevideo, Uruguay
- Capacity: 6,000
- Chairman: Miguel Romero
- Manager: Julio Mozzo
- League: Segunda División
- 2021: Primera División, 16th (relegated)
Home colours	Away colours

Club Social y Deportivo Villa Española, usually known as Villa Española, is a football and boxing club located in Montevideo, Uruguay. It is best known for its football department, which is currently playing in the Uruguayan Primera División, and has its home games at Estadio Obdulio Varela.

== History ==
The club was founded on 18 August 1940 as a boxing club, and as a football club in 1950. The club's most important title was winning the Uruguayan Segunda División in 2001. As a result, it was promoted to the Primera División, where it stayed until relegation in 2003. Villa Española couldn't play the 2005 and 2006 Segunda División tournaments because of economic problems. They returned for the 2007–08 season and achieved promotion, but were relegated to the Segunda División Amateur (3rd division) because of economic problems after the 2008–09 season.

In 2013 the club was able to pay its debts and achieved promotion to the Segunda División. In 2016 it gained promotion to the Primera División, but was immediately relegated that same season.

== Titles ==
- Segunda División: 1

2001

- Segunda División Amateur: 5

1973, 1980, 1987, 1996, 2014

== Current squad ==
As of 25 September 2020

Note: Flags indicate national team as defined under FIFA eligibility rules; some limited exceptions apply. Players may hold more than one non-FIFA nationality.

No.	Pos.	Nation	Player
1	GK	URU	Facundo Silva
3	DF	URU	Carlos Santucho
4	DF	URU	Matías Malvino
5	MF	URU	William Machado
6	MF	URU	Robert Flores (on loan from Boston River)
7	MF	URU	Emiliano Ghan
8	FW	URU	Santiago López
9	FW	URU	Pablo Silva
10	MF	URU	Leandro Silva
11	MF	URU	Christian Tizón
12	GK	URU	Hernán Espinoza
13	MF	URU	Mathías Riquero
14	MF	URU	Ivo Allende
15	MF	URU	Gabriel Albín

No.	Pos.	Nation	Player
17	FW	URU	Yhojan Díaz
18	MF	URU	Federico Mautone
19	FW	URU	Denis Olivera (on loan from Peñarol)
20	DF	URU	Federico Puente
21	GK	URU	Hernán Espinosa
22	DF	URU	Gabriel Acevedo
23	FW	URU	Facundo Tancredi
24	DF	URU	Emiliano Albín
25	MF	URU	Jonathan Ríos
26	FW	URU	Facundo Godoy
31	MF	URU	Gustavo Aprile
32	FW	URU	Santiago Ramírez
33	DF	URU	Martín Amuz
34	DF	URU	Nicolás Digiano (on loan from Montevideo City Torque)
