= Facundo Ospitaleche =

Uruguayan footballer (born 1996)

Personal information
- Full name: Facundo Ospitaleche Hernández
- Date of birth: 11 April 1996 (age 30)
- Place of birth: Montevideo, Uruguay
- Height: 1.79 m (5 ft 10 1/2 in)
- Position: Midfielder

Team information
- Current team: Deportivo Madryn

Youth career
- –2015: Defensor Sporting

Senior career*
Years	Team	Apps	(Gls)
2015–2021	Defensor Sporting	1	(0)
2016–2017	→ Venados (loan)	25	(0)
2017–2020	→ River Plate (loan)	105	(1)
2021	Fénix	1	(0)
2021	Águilas Doradas	19	(0)
2022	Deportivo Pasto	31	(0)
2023	Racing de Montevideo	9	(0)
2023–2024	Cavese	7	(0)
2024–2025	Rampla Juniors	7	(0)
2025–2026	Manta	30	(2)
2026–	Deportivo Madryn	4	(0)

International career
2013–2014	Uruguay U17	10	(1)
- * Club domestic league appearances and goals as of 16:42, 27 April 2026 (UTC)

Facundo Ospitaleche Hernández (born 11 April 1996) is an Uruguayan professional footballer who plays for Deportivo Madryn.
