= Luis Urruti =

Uruguayan footballer (born 1992)

Personal information
- Full name: Luis Alfredo Urruti Giménez
- Date of birth: 11 September 1992 (age 34)
- Place of birth: Conchillas, Uruguay
- Height: 1.72 m (5 ft 8 in)
- Position: Forward

Team information
- Current team: Sport Boys
- Number: 11

Youth career
- 2009–2011: Fénix

Senior career*
Years	Team	Apps	(Gls)
2013–2016	Cerro	41	(7)
2016–2018	Peñarol	6	(1)
2017–2018	→ CA Fénix (loan)	17	(1)
2018–2021	River Plate	39	(9)
2020–2021	→ Universitario de Deportes (loan)	42	(11)
2022–2023	Universitario de Deportes	40	(11)
2024	Deportivo Garcilaso	8	(3)
2024	Carlos A. Mannucci	17	(4)
2025-	Sport Boys	28	(5)
- * Club domestic league appearances and goals as of 30 December 2025

Luis Alfredo Urruti Giménez (born 11 September 1992) is a Uruguayan footballer who plays as a forward for Peruvian Liga 1 club Sport Boys.

== Career ==
Urruti played in the youth ranks of Centro Atlético Fénix, where he stayed until December 2011, when he left football due to his father's death. He returned to football in 2013 to play in Club Atlético Cerro, being promoted to the first team that same year under manager Danilo Baltierra. That season, in a match against Peñarol, he suffered a concussion and had to leave the field in an ambulance. He had a great 2015-16 season, helping Cerro to qualify to the 2017 Copa Libertadores and scoring 6 goals, which made the big teams in Uruguay take an interest in him.

Club Nacional and Club Peñarol both disputed Urruti's signing, with the latter team being the most interested in it. In July 2016, his transfer to Peñarol was formally announced, with him signing a contract for three years. He considered his move to Peñarol to be a dream fulfilled, due to him being a team fan. Urruti played in the 2016 Copa Sudamericana, where Peñarol was eliminated by Sportivo Luqueño. With the arrival of manager Leonardo Ramos, he stopped playing regularly. Despite not being a part of Ramos' plans, the club's board decided that Urruti would stay until the end of the season. In August 2017, he was loaned to C.A. Fénix, where he returned to play frequently and became a key player.

In 2018, despite having a year remaining in his contract with Peñarol, Urruti rescinded his contract and moved to River Plate de Montevideo, where he returned to his best level and became a key player for the team. He also played in the 2019 Copa Sudamericana. In December 2019, it was announced that Urruti would be loaned to Universitario de Deportes for one year, with an option to sign a permanent contract. He arrived on request by manager Gregorio Pérez and shortly after scored twice in a 2–1 home victory against Sport Huancayo, for which he was awarded best player of matchday 2 of the 2020 Liga 1. Urruti played in the 2020 Copa Libertadores, where Universitario was eliminated in the second qualifying stage by Cerro Porteño.

== Honours ==
=== Club ===
Peñarol

- Uruguayan Primera División: 2017
- 2018 Supercopa Uruguaya

Universitario de Deportes

- Torneo Apertura 2020
- Peruvian Primera División: 2023
