= Santiago Pérez (footballer) =

Uruguayan football player (born 1998)

Personal information
- Full name: Santiago Martín Pérez Casal
- Date of birth: 8 November 1998 (age 28)
- Place of birth: Montevideo, Uruguay
- Height: 1.76 m (5 ft 9 in)
- Position: Left-back

Team information
- Current team: Villa Española
- Number: 6

Youth career
- River Plate

Senior career*
Years	Team	Apps	(Gls)
2018–2022	River Plate	27	(0)
2018	→ Albion (loan)	2	(0)
2022-	Villa Española	0	(0)

International career^{‡}
2015	Uruguay U17	4	(0)
- * Club domestic league appearances and goals as of 24 February 2019 ‡ National team caps and goals as of 24 February 2019

Santiago Martín Pérez Casal (born 8 November 1998) is a Uruguayan footballer who plays as a defender for Villa Española.
