= Diego Thomas de Santuchos =

Spanish nobleman and conquistador

Personal details
- Born: 1549 Zaragoza, Spain
- Died: 1624 (aged 74–75) Santa Fe
- Occupation: Conquistador
- Profession: Military

Diego Thomas de Santuchos (1549–1624) was a Spanish Nobleman, Conquistador of Asunción and Santa Fe during the Viceroyalty of Peru.

== Biography ==
Diego Thomas de Santuchos was born in Zaragoza, was married to Catalina Correa de Santa Ana (born in Andalucia). Santuchos and his wife arrived at the Rio de la Plata in the expedition of Juan Ortiz de Zárate.

Diego Tómas de Santuchos, was Lieutenant governor of Santa Fe, died on October 29, 1624.
