= Juan Pablo Plada =

Uruguayan footballer (born 1998)

Personal information
- Full name: Juan Pablo Plada Ricci
- Date of birth: 6 August 1998 (age 28)
- Place of birth: Maldonado, Uruguay
- Height: 1.74 m (5 ft 9 in)
- Position: Left midfielder

Team information
- Current team: Rampla Juniors
- Number: 15

Senior career*
Years	Team	Apps	(Gls)
2019–2022	River Plate	48	(1)
2022–2023	Deportivo Maldonado	15	(0)
2023–2024	Atenas	27	(4)
2024–	Rampla Juniors	5	(0)
- * Club domestic league appearances and goals as of 14 September 2024

Juan Pablo Plada Ricci (born 6 August 1998) is a Uruguayan footballer who plays as a midfielder for Rampla Juniors in the Uruguayan Primera División.

== Career ==
=== River Plate ===
A graduate of the club's youth academy, Plada made his debut on 12 February 2019 in a 0-0 draw with Santos during Copa Sudamericana play. He scored his first goal for the club later that season, scoring the opener in the 50th minute of a 2-1 victory over Cerro.

== Career statistics ==
=== Club ===
As of match played 11 December 2020

Appearances and goals by club, season and competition
Club	Season	League			Cup		Continental (Note: Includes Copa Sudamericana)		Other		Total	
Club	Season	Division	Apps	Goals	Apps	Goals	Apps	Goals	Apps	Goals	Apps	Goals
River Plate	2019	Uruguayan Primera División	20	1	—	—	4	0	—	—	24	1
River Plate	2020	Uruguayan Primera División	13	0	—	—	0	0	—	—	13	0
Career total			33	1	—	—	4	0	—	—	37	1
