= Wiston Fernández =

Uruguayan footballer (born 1998)

Personal information
- Full name: Wiston Daniel Fernández Queirolo
- Date of birth: 4 January 1998 (age 28)
- Place of birth: Montevideo, Uruguay
- Height: 1.82 m (6 ft 0 in)
- Position: Midfielder

Team information
- Current team: Alianza
- Number: 33

Youth career
- Defensor Sporting

Senior career*
| Years | Team | Apps | (Gls) |
| 2017 | Defensor Sporting | 0 | (0) |
| 2017 | → Boston River (loan) | 4 | (0) |
| 2018–2021 | Boston River | 90 | (2) |
| 2021 | → Danubio (loan) | 11 | (0) |
| 2022 | Delfín | 25 | (1) |
| 2023 | Guayaquil City | 30 | (0) |
| 2024 | Fénix | 25 | (1) |
| 2024– | Alianza | 32 | (3) |

International career^{‡}
| 2014–2015 | Uruguay U17 | 24 | (0) |
| 2016 | Uruguay U20 | 7 | (0) |
| 2024– | Uruguay A' | 1 | (0) |
- * Club domestic league appearances and goals as of 12 December 2025 ‡ National team caps and goals as of 1 September 2024

Wiston Daniel Fernández Queirolo (born 4 January 1998) is a Uruguayan professional footballer who plays as a midfielder for Alianza.

== Club career ==
An academy product of Defensor Sporting, Fernández made his professional debut on 18 September 2017 while being on loan at Boston River. He came on as a 71st minute substitute for Robert Mario Flores, as his side won the match 1–0 against El Tanque Sisley. He scored his first goal on 6 May 2018 in a 2–1 league win against Racing Club.

In August 2021, Fernández joined Danubio on a short term loan deal until the end of the year.

== International career ==
Fernández is a former Uruguay youth international and has represented his nation at under-17 and under-20 levels. He was part of Uruguayan squad at the 2015 South American U-17 Championship.

On 1 September 2024, Fernández made his debut for Uruguay A' national team in a 1–1 draw against Guatemala.

== Career statistics ==
=== Club ===
As of 22 May 2021

| Club | Season | League | | | Cup | | Continental | | Total | |
| Club | Season | Division | Apps | Goals | Apps | Goals | Apps | Goals | Apps | Goals |
|---|---|---|---|---|---|---|---|---|---|---|
| Defensor Sporting | 2017 | Uruguayan Primera División | 0 | 0 | — | | 0 | 0 | 0 | 0 |
| Boston River (loan) | 2017 | Uruguayan Primera División | 4 | 0 | — | | — | | 4 | 0 |
| Boston River | 2018 | Uruguayan Primera División | 20 | 1 | — | | 4 (Note: Appearances in Copa Sudamericana.) | 0 | 24 | 1 |
| Boston River | 2019 | Uruguayan Primera División | 27 | 1 | — | | — | | 27 | 1 |
| Boston River | 2020 | Uruguayan Primera División | 34 | 0 | — | | — | | 34 | 0 |
| Boston River | 2021 | Uruguayan Primera División | 2 | 0 | — | | — | | 2 | 0 |
| Boston River | Total | | 83 | 2 | 0 | 0 | 4 | 0 | 87 | 2 |
| Career total | | | 87 | 2 | 0 | 0 | 4 | 0 | 91 | 2 |
