= Esteban González (footballer, born 1991) =

Uruguayan association football player

Personal information
- Full name: Esteban Ricardo González Maciel
- Date of birth: 26 January 1991 (age 35)
- Place of birth: Durazno, Uruguay
- Height: 1.79 m (5 ft 10 in)
- Position: Midfielder

Team information
- Current team: Gimnasia Jujuy

Senior career*
| Years | Team | Apps | (Gls) |
| –2010 | Durazno | | |
| 2010–2011 | El Tanque Sisley | 1 | (0) |
| 2012–2016 | Tacuarembó | 50 | (1) |
| 2016–2019 | Cerro Largo | 34 | (7) |
| 2017 | → Juventud (loan) | 23 | (1) |
| 2019–2021 | Progreso | 62 | (10) |
| 2021 | Rentistas | 17 | (0) |
| 2022– | Gimnasia Jujuy | 18 | (3) |
- * Club domestic league appearances and goals as of 18:51, 21 July 2022 (UTC)

Esteban Ricardo González Maciel (born 26 January 1991) is a Uruguayan professional footballer who plays as a Midfielder for Gimnasia Jujuy in the Primera Nacional.
