= Martín Rabuñal =

Uruguayan footballer (born 1994)

Personal information
- Full name: Martín Ernesto Rabuñal Rey
- Date of birth: 22 April 1994 (age 32)
- Place of birth: Montevideo, Uruguay
- Height: 1.84 m (6 ft 0 in)
- Position: Midfielder

Team information
- Current team: Liverpool Montevideo
- Number: 20

Youth career
- Juventud Unida
- Defensor Sporting

Senior career*
Years	Team	Apps	(Gls)
2014–2022	Defensor Sporting	136	(11)
2020	→ Juárez (loan)	16	(1)
2021	→ Rosario Central (loan)	2	(1)
2022–2023	Montevideo City Torque	13	(1)
2023	La Luz	10	(0)
2024	Cerro	33	(2)
2025–	Liverpool Montevideo	29	(2)
- * Club domestic league appearances and goals as of 1 October 2025

Martín Ernesto Rabuñal Rey (born 22 April 1994) is a Uruguayan professional footballer who plays as a midfielder for Liverpool Montevideo.

== Career ==
A youth academy graduate of Defensor Sporting, Rabuñal made his professional debut for the club on 7 December 2014 in a 2–0 league win against Rampla Juniors. He scored his first professional goal on 26 April 2015 in a 2–2 draw against El Tanque Sisley.

In January 2020, Rabuñal joined Mexican club Juárez on a season long loan deal. He left the club in December 2020 after playing 21 matches.

On 3 March 2021, Argentine club Rosario Central announced the signing of Rabuñal on a loan deal until December 2021. On 15 March 2021, he made his debut for the club in a 2–1 cup win against Arsenal de Sarandí. He replaced Rafael Sangiovani on 78th minute of the match and scored a goal four minutes later. Shortly after he arrived he suffered a ruptured anterior cruciate ligament injury in his right knee at the beginning of April (in training). However, the loan spell was extended with one year at the end of December 2021.

On 31 July 2022, Rabuñal joined Montevideo City Torque, signing a deal until the end of 2023.
