= Facundo Silvera (footballer, born 1997) =

Uruguayan footballer

Personal information
- Full name: Facundo Silvera Paz
- Date of birth: 20 January 1997 (age 29)
- Place of birth: Montevideo, Uruguay
- Height: 1.73 m (5 ft 8 in)
- Position: Left-back

Team information
- Current team: Montevideo City Torque
- Number: 26

Senior career*
Years	Team	Apps	(Gls)
2017–2021	River Plate Montevideo	30	(2)
2021	Villa Teresa	8	(0)
2022–2023	Rampla Juniors	20	(0)
2023	→ Almagro (loan)	28	(0)
2024–2025	Progreso	49	(1)
2025–	Montevideo City Torque	8	(1)
- * Club domestic league appearances and goals as of 1 October 2025

Facundo Silvera Paz (born 20 January 1997) is a Uruguayan footballer who plays as a defender for Uruguayan Primera División club Montevideo City Torque.

== Career ==
=== River Plate ===
A graduate of the club's youth academy, Silvera made his debut for the club on 28 May 2017, coming on as an 86th-minute substitute for Gonzalo Vega Martínez in a 2–1 defeat to Nacional. Nearly two years later, he scored his first goal for the club, scoring late in a 4–1 victory over Racing Club. Prior to the 2021 season, Silvera was released by the club.

== Career statistics ==
=== Club ===
As of match played 11 December 2020

Appearances and goals by club, season and competition
Club	Season	League			Cup		Continental (Note: Includes Copa Sudamericana)		Other		Total	
Club	Season	Division	Apps	Goals	Apps	Goals	Apps	Goals	Apps	Goals	Apps	Goals
River Plate	2017	Uruguayan Primera División	4	0	—	—	—	—	—	—	4	0
River Plate	2018	Uruguayan Primera División	12	0	—	—	—	—	—	—	12	0
River Plate	2019	Uruguayan Primera División	4	1	—	—	0	0	—	—	4	1
River Plate	2020	Uruguayan Primera División	10	1	—	—	0	0	—	—	10	1
Career total			30	2	—	—	0	0	—	—	30	2
