= Facundo Boné =

Uruguayan footballer (born 1995)

Personal information
- Full name: Facundo Nicolás Boné Vale
- Date of birth: 16 November 1995 (age 30)
- Place of birth: Colonia del Sacramento, Uruguay
- Height: 1.76 m (5 ft 9 in)
- Position: Left winger

Team information
- Current team: Deportivo Pasto
- Number: 77

Youth career
- –2013: Fénix

Senior career*
Years	Team	Apps	(Gls)
2013–2016	Fénix	34	(2)
2016–2018	Nacional	0	(0)
2017–2021	River Plate	77	(11)
2019	→ Vila Nova (loan)	12	(0)
2022	Deportivo Pasto	37	(7)
2023–2024	Deportes Tolima	52	(7)
2025–	Deportivo Pasto	35	(7)

International career
2015	Uruguay U20	3	(0)
- * Club domestic league appearances and goals as of 12 December 2025

Facundo Nicolás Boné Vale (born 16 November 1995) is a Uruguayan footballer who plays for Internacional de Bogota.

== Club career ==
Boné started his career playing with Fénix in the Uruguayan Primera División in 2013.

== International career ==
Boné represented the Uruguay national under-20 football team at the 2015 South American Youth Championship and in the pre-squad for the 2015 FIFA U-20 World Cup.
