= Francisco Tinaglini =

Uruguayan footballer (born 1998)

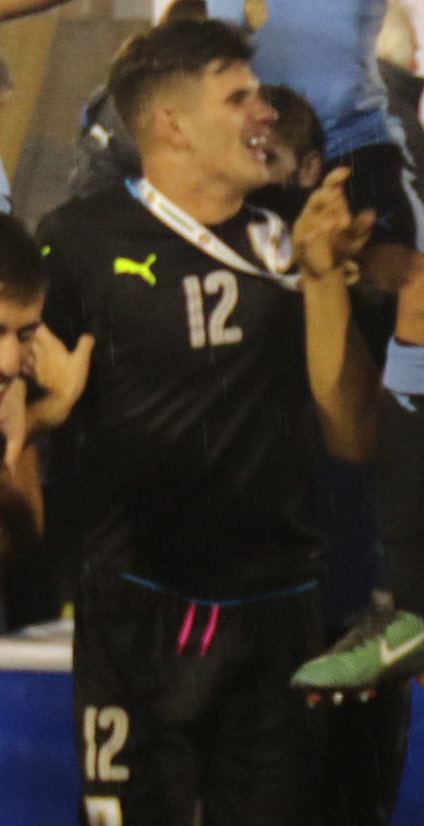
- Tinaglini in 2017

Personal information
- Full name: Juan Francisco Tinaglini Olariaga
- Date of birth: 9 November 1998 (age 28)
- Place of birth: San Ramón, Uruguay
- Height: 1.88 m (6 ft 2 in)
- Position: Goalkeeper

Team information
- Current team: Panserraikos
- Number: 77

Youth career
- River Plate Montevideo

Senior career*
Years	Team	Apps	(Gls)
2018–2020	River Plate Montevideo	2	(0)
2018	→ Oriental (loan)	4	(0)
2020–2025	Montevideo City Torque	51	(0)
2020	→ Atenas (loan)	2	(0)
2023	→ San Martín Tucumán (loan)	1	(0)
2025–	Panserraikos	32	(0)

International career
2014–2015	Uruguay U17	7	(0)
2016–2017	Uruguay U20	7	(0)
Medal record
Men's football
Representing Uruguay
South American U-20 Championship
Winner	2017 Ecuador
- * Club domestic league appearances and goals as of 20 September 2026

Juan Francisco Tinaglini Olariaga (born 9 November 1998) is a Uruguayan professional footballer who plays as a goalkeeper for Super League Greece 2 club Panserraikos.

== Career statistics ==
As of 4 May 2025

Club	Division	Season	League		Cup		Continental		Total	
Club	Division	Season	Apps	Goals	Apps	Goals	Apps	Goals	Apps	Goals
Oriental	Uruguayan Segunda División	2018	4	0	—		—		4	0
River Plate Montevideo	Uruguayan Primera División	2019	2	0	—		—		2	0
Atenas	Uruguayan Segunda División	2020	2	0	—		—		2	0
Montevideo City Torque	Uruguayan Primera División	2021	—		—		—		0	0
Montevideo City Torque	Uruguayan Primera División	2022	4	0	—		2	0	6	0
San Martín Tucumán	Primera B Nacional	2023	1	0	2	0	—		3	0
Montevideo City Torque	Uruguayan Primera División	2023	3	0	1	0	—		4	0
Montevideo City Torque	Uruguayan Segunda División	2024	30	0	5	0	—		35	0
Montevideo City Torque	Uruguayan Primera División	2025	14	0	—		—		14	0
Montevideo City Torque	Total		51	0	6	0	2	0	59	0
Career total			60	0	8	0	2	0	70	0
