= Cristian Martín =

Uruguayan footballer (born 1998)

Personal information
- Full name: Cristian Martín Villero
- Date of birth: 21 January 1998 (age 28)
- Place of birth: San José de Mayo, Uruguay
- Height: 1.78 m (5 ft 10 in)
- Position: Forward

Team information
- Current team: River Plate
- Number: 21

Senior career*
Years	Team	Apps	(Gls)
2017–	River Plate	5	(0)
2020–21	→ Tacuarembó (loan)	9	(0)
- * Club domestic league appearances and goals as of April 22, 2021

Cristian Martín Villero (born 21 January 1998) is a Uruguayan footballer who plays as a forward for River Plate in the Uruguayan Primera División.

== Career ==
A graduate of the club's youth academy, Martín made his professional debut for the club on 4 June 2017, coming on as a halftime substitute for Mathías Saavedra in a 2–0 defeat to Sud América.

== Career statistics ==
As of match played 28 November 2020

Appearances and goals by club, season and competition
Club	Season	League			Cup		Other		Total	
Club	Season	Division	Apps	Goals	Apps	Goals	Apps	Goals	Apps	Goals
River Plate	2017	Uruguayan Primera División	4	0	—	—	—	—	4	0
River Plate	2018	Uruguayan Primera División	1	0	—	—	—	—	1	0
River Plate	2019	Uruguayan Primera División	0	0	—	—	—	—	0	0
River Plate	Total		5	0	—	—	—	—	5	0
Tacuarembó (loan)	2020	Uruguayan Segunda División	9	0	—	—	—	—	9	0
Tacuarembó (loan)	Total		9	0	—	—	—	—	9	0
Career total			14	0	—	—	—	—	14	0
