= Joaquín Fernández (footballer, born 1999) =

Uruguayan association football player

Personal information
- Full name: Joaquín Fernández Pertusso
- Date of birth: 22 January 1999 (age 27)
- Place of birth: Rocha, Uruguay
- Height: 1.84 m (6 ft 0 in)
- Position: Defender

Youth career
- Defensor Sporting
- River Plate Montevideo

Senior career*
Years	Team	Apps	(Gls)
2018–2020	River Plate Montevideo	22	(0)
2020–2023	Heerenveen	0	(0)
2021	→ Montevideo City Torque (loan)	14	(0)
2022	→ Atenas (loan)	20	(0)
2023	Boston River	2	(0)
2023	Atenas	13	(1)
2024	Levski Sofia	3	(0)
2024–2025	Dorados	19	(3)
2025	Tijuana	5	(0)
2025	Deportes La Serena	9	(1)

International career
2017	Uruguay U18	1	(0)
2018	Uruguay U20	3	(0)
- * Club domestic league appearances and goals as of 24 January 2026

Joaquín Fernández Pertusso (born 22 January 1999) is a Uruguayan professional footballer who plays as a defender.

== Club career ==
A youth academy product of Defensor Sporting, Fernández joined River Plate Montevideo prior to the 2018 Uruguayan Primera División season. He made his professional debut on 12 May 2018 in a 1–0 league win against his former club Defensor.

On 6 August 2020, Eredivisie club Heerenveen announced the signing of Fernández on a three-year deal. On 4 March 2021, he returned to Uruguay by signing for Montevideo City Torque on a loan deal until the end of the year. On 15 January 2023, he joined Boston River.

On 1 February 2024, Fernández signed a one-and-a-half-year deal with Bulgarian First League club Levski Sofia, becoming the first ever Uruguayan to join the club. Four months later on 1 June, his contract was terminated by mutual consent.

On 12 July 2024, Fernández joined Mexican club Dorados.

In August 2025, Fernández moved to Chile and joined Deportes La Serena.

== International career ==
Fernández has represented Uruguay at under-18 and under-20 level.

== Personal life ==
Joaquín is the younger brother of Progreso midfielder Fabricio. Fernández also holds an Italian passport.

== Career statistics ==
=== Club ===
As of 6 August 2020

Club	Season	League			Cup		Continental		Other		Total	
Club	Season	Division	Apps	Goals	Apps	Goals	Apps	Goals	Apps	Goals	Apps	Goals
River Plate Montevideo	2018	Primera División	2	0	—		—		—		2	0
River Plate Montevideo	2019	Primera División	18	0	—		0	0	1 (Note: Appearance in Torneo Intermedio final.)	0	19	0
River Plate Montevideo	2020	Primera División	2	0	—		2 (Note: Appearances in Copa Sudamericana.)	0	—		4	0
River Plate Montevideo	Total		22	0	0	0	2	0	1	0	25	0
Heerenveen	2020–21	Eredivisie	0	0	0	0	—		—		0	0
Career total			22	0	0	0	2	0	1	0	25	0
