= Estadio Abraham Paladino =

Parque Abraham Paladino
- Interactive map of Parque Abraham Paladino
- Location: Montevideo, Uruguay
- Coordinates: 34°52′24″S 56°14′4″W
- Capacity: 8,000
- Surface: grass

Construction
- Opened: 1983

Tenant
- CA Progreso

Parque Abraham Paladino is a multi-use stadium in Montevideo, Uruguay. It is currently used primarily for football matches and is the home ground of CA Progreso. The stadium holds 8,000 spectators and was built in 1983.
