= Gabriel Leyes =

Uruguayan footballer (born 1990)

Personal information
- Full name: Hober Gabriel Leyes Viera
- Date of birth: 29 May 1990 (age 36)
- Place of birth: Paysandú, Uruguay
- Height: 1.86 m (6 ft 1 in)
- Position: Forward

Team information
- Current team: Porongos
- Number: 33

Youth career
- Independencia
- Litoral
- Juventud Unida
- 2006–2007: Liverpool
- 2007: Juventud Unida

Senior career*
Years	Team	Apps	(Gls)
2007	Juventud Unida		
2007–20??	Juventud		
2011–2013	River Plate	45	(13)
2013–2017	Peñarol	18	(2)
2016	→ Juventud (loan)	10	(2)
2016	→ Plaza Colonia (loan)	11	(5)
2017	→ Liverpool (loan)	10	(1)
2017–2018	Alianza Lima	21	(3)
2018–2019	River Plate	20	(1)
2020	Cerro Largo	11	(1)
2021	Academia Cantolao	23	(11)
2022	Carlos Stein	28	(7)
2023	Academia Cantolao	15	(4)
2023	Municipal	14	(5)
2024–2025	Danubio	17	(2)
- * Club domestic league appearances and goals as of 8 September 2024

Hober Gabriel Leyes Viera (born 29 May 1990) is an Uruguayan professional footballer who plays as a forward for Porongos.

== Club career ==
Leyes started playing football at the age of 4 in Paysandú. He played until he was 12, starting in Independencia and later Litoral. Leyes then quit football at the age of 12, because he wasn't playing, which he wasn't used to. So he decided to quit.

He returned to play at the age of 14, joining Juventud Unida. In 2006, he went to Liverpool Montevideo, where he played for the clubs U16s and in the following year, he made the preseason with the clubs first team, but was released shortly after.

After being released, Leyes again wanted to quit playing. However, he returned to Juventud Unida where he soon after, got his debut for the clubs senior team at the age of 17.

In 2007, Leyes returned to Montevideo, joining Juventud who at the time, was playing in the First Division of Uruguayan football. The club later got into financial difficulties and Leyes decided to terminate his contract, as the club hadn't paid him his salary.

Leyes then returned to Paysandú and was training by him self for six months, before he suddenly got a trial invitation from River Plate, where he played a friendly game for the club against Defensor Sporting and scored. He then signed a four-year deal with the club.

In 2023, Leyes signed for Peruvian club Academia Cantolao.

== Personal life ==
Leyes' first name, Hober, was given to him by his parents in honor of Peñarol legend Juan Hohberg.
