= 2017 River Plate Montevideo season =

River Plate
2017 season
- President: Willie Tucci
- Head coach: (Uruguay) (Colombia) Julio Avelino Comesaña (December 26, 2016 – March 13, 2017) (Uruguay) Pablo Tiscornia (March 14, 2017)
- Stadium: Estadio Saroldi
- Uruguayan Primera División: 9th
- Top goalscorer: League: Mathías Saavedra (7 goals); All: Mathías Saavedra (7 goals)
| Home colours | Away colours |

River Plate took part in the Uruguayan Primera División and Torneo Intermedio.

== Transfer Window ==
=== Summer 2017 ===
==== In ====
| Position | Nationality | Name | Age | From | Fee | Transfer window | Ref. |
|---|---|---|---|---|---|---|---|
| MF | (Uruguay) | Maximiliano Arias | 28 | Liverpool | Free agent | Summer | tenfield.com.uy |
| DF | (Uruguay) | Yefferson Moreira | 25 | El Tanque Sisley | Free agent | Summer | tenfield.com.uy |
| MF | (Uruguay) | Agustín Gutiérrez | 24 | Racing | Free agent | Summer | tenfield.com.uy |
| MF | (Uruguay) | Gonzalo Vega | 24 | Sud América | Free agent | Summer | tenfield.com.uy |
| DF | (Uruguay) | Williams Martínez | 34 | Rampla Juniors | Free agent | Summer | tenfield.com.uy |
| DF | (Uruguay) | Nicolás Rodríguez | 25 | Plaza Colonia | Free agent | Summer | tenfield.com.uy |
| MF | (Uruguay) | Joaquín Noy | 24 | (Colombia) Once Caldas | Free agent | Summer | tenfield.com.uy |
| MF | (Uruguay) | Santiago Scotto | 19 | – | Reserves | Summer | tenfield.com.uy |

==== Out ====
| Position | Nationality | Name | Age | To | Fee | Transfer Window | Ref. |
|---|---|---|---|---|---|---|---|
| FW | (Brazil) | Thiago | 30 | – | Free agent | Summer | tenfield.com.uy |
| MF | (Uruguay) | Federico Pintos | 24 | Boston River | Free agent | Summer | tenfield.com.uy |
| MF | (Uruguay) | Bruno Montelongo | 29 | (Spain) CF Extremadura | Free agent | Summer | tenfield.com.uy |
| DF | (Uruguay) | Cristian Maciel | 24 | (Guatemala) Deportivo Guastatoya | Transfer | Summer | clickdeportivo.com |
| FW | (Uruguay) | Diego Casas | 21 | Juventud | Free agent | Summer | tenfield.com.uy |
| FW | (Uruguay) | Horacio Sequeira | 21 | Cerro Largo | Free agent | Summer | soccerway.com |

=== Winter 2017 ===
==== In ====
| Position | Nationality | Name | Age | From | Fee | Transfer Window | Ref. |
|---|---|---|---|---|---|---|---|
| MF | (Uruguay) | Facundo Silvera | 20 | – | Reserves | Winter | tenfield.com.uy |
| MF | (Uruguay) | Ezequiel Peña | 19 | – | Reserves | Winter | tenfield.com.uy |
| FW | (Uruguay) | Juan Manuel Olivera | 35 | Danubio | Free agent | Winter | tenfield.com.uy |
| MF | (Uruguay) | Bruno Piñatares | 27 | (Australia) Western Sydney Wanderers | Free agent | Winter | tenfield.com.uy |
| DF | (Uruguay) | Deivis Barone | 37 | Rentistas | Free agent | Winter | tenfield.com.uy |
| DF | (Uruguay) | Santiago Etchebarne | 22 | Canadian | Free agent | Winter | tenfield.com.uy |
| MF | (Uruguay) | Facundo Ospitaleche | 21 | Defensor Sporting | Free agent | Winter | tenfield.com.uy |
| FW | (Uruguay) | Facundo Boné | 21 | Fénix | Free agent | Winter | tenfield.com.uy |
| FW | (Uruguay) | Facundo Peraza | 25 | Cerro | Free agent | Winter | tenfield.com.uy |

==== Out ====
| Position | Nationality | Name | Age | To | Fee | Transfer Window | Ref. |
|---|---|---|---|---|---|---|---|
| DF | (Brazil) | Ricardo Lima | 23 | – | Free agent | Winter | tenfield.com.uy |
| MF | (Uruguay) | Fernando Gorriarán | 22 | (Hungary) Ferencvárosi | Transfer | Winter | tenfield.com.uy |
| DF | (Uruguay) | Lucas Ruiz | 21 | – | Free agent | Winter | telfield.com.uy |
| FW | (Colombia) | César Taján | 26 | – | Free agent | Winter | telfield.com.uy |
| FW | (Uruguay) | Richard Porta | 33 | – | Free agent | Winter | telfield.com.uy |
| MF | (Uruguay) | Joaquín Noy | 24 | – | Free agent | Winter | tenfield.com.uy |
| DF | (Uruguay) | Diego Rodríguez | 30 | – | Free agent | Winter | tenfield.com.uy |
| DF | (Uruguay) | Yefferson Moreira | 26 | Rentistas | Free agent | Winter | telfield.com.uy |
| MF | (Uruguay) | Maximiliano Arias | 28 | – | Free agent | Winter | tenfield.com.uy |
| MF | (Uruguay) | Agustín Gutiérrez | 25 | Cerro | Free agent | Winter | tenfield.com.uy |

== Squad ==
=== First team squad ===
As of Aug 24, 2017

Note: Flags indicate national team as defined under FIFA eligibility rules; some limited exceptions apply. Players may hold more than one non-FIFA nationality.

| No. | Pos. | Nation | Player |
|---|---|---|---|
| 1 | GK | URU | Nicola Pérez |
| 2 | DF | URU | Agustín Ale |
| 3 | DF | URU | Deivis Barone |
| 5 | MF | URU | Facundo Ospitaleche |
| 6 | DF | URU | Williams Martínez |
| 7 | DF | URU | Nicolás Rodríguez |
| 8 | MF | URU | Bruno Piñatares |
| 9 | FW | URU | Facundo Peraza |
| 10 | MF | URU | Matías Jones |
| 11 | FW | URU | Cristian Martin |
| 12 | GK | URU | Juan Tinaglini |
| 14 | DF | URU | Iván Silva |
| 15 | FW | URU | Facundo Vigo |
| 16 | MF | URU | Gonzalo Vega |

| No. | Pos. | Nation | Player |
|---|---|---|---|
| 17 | FW | URU | Mauro Da Luz |
| 18 | MF | URU | Fabricio Fernández |
| 19 | FW | URU | Juan Manuel Olivera |
| 20 | DF | URU | Giovanni González |
| 21 | FW | URU | Alexander Rosso |
| 22 | DF | URU | Claudio Herrera |
| 23 | FW | URU | Mathías Saavedra |
| 24 | MF | URU | Santiago Scotto |
| 25 | GK | URU | Gastón Olveira |
| 26 | MF | URU | Facundo Silvera |
| 27 | FW | URU | Facundo Boné |
| 28 | MF | URU | José Neris |
| 29 | MF | URU | Diego Vicente |
| 30 | FW | URU | Ezequiel Peña |

=== Reserve squad ===
Note: Flags indicate national team as defined under FIFA eligibility rules; some limited exceptions apply. Players may hold more than one non-FIFA nationality.

| No. | Pos. | Nation | Player |
|---|---|---|---|
| — | GK | URU | Maximiliano Barrios |
| — | DF | URU | Santiago Etchebarne |
| — | DF | URU | Gonzalo López |
| — | DF | URU | Pablo Sentena |
| — | DF | URU | Jonathan Toledo |
| — | MF | URU | Nahuel Rodríguez |
| — | MF | URU | Facundo Gutiérrez |
| — | MF | URU | Pablo González |

| No. | Pos. | Nation | Player |
|---|---|---|---|
| — | MF | URU | Armando Méndez |
| — | MF | URU | Leandro Kraft |
| — | MF | URU | Sepe Almada |
| — | FW | URU | Álvaro Fernández |
| — | FW | URU | Kevin Carrasco |
| — | FW | URU | Luis Ferrón |
| — | FW | URU | Rodrigo Bardesio |
| — | FW | URU | Francis D'Albenas |

=== Out on loan ===
Note: Flags indicate national team as defined under FIFA eligibility rules; some limited exceptions apply. Players may hold more than one non-FIFA nationality.

| No. | Pos. | Nation | Player |
|---|---|---|---|
| — | FW | URU | Nicolás Machado (at Villa Teresa) |
| — | DF | URU | Esteban Mascareña (at Villa Española) |

=== Top scorers ===
Last update on Dec 5, 2017

| Rank | Pos. | No. | Name | Primera División | Torneo Intermedio | Total |
|---|---|---|---|---|---|---|
| 1 | FW | 23 | (Uruguay) Mathías Saavedra | 6 | 1 | 7 |
| 2 | FW | 19 | (Uruguay) Juan Manuel Olivera | 5 | 0 | 5 |
| 3 | MF | - | (Uruguay) Fernando Gorriarán | 3 | 1 | 4 |
| 4 | DF | 22 | (Uruguay) Claudio Herrera | 1 | 2 | 3 |
| 4 | MF | 20 | (Uruguay) Giovanni González | 3 | 0 | 3 |
| 4 | FW | 21 | (Uruguay) Alexander Rosso | 3 | 0 | 3 |
| 4 | FW | 16 | (Uruguay) Gonzalo Vega | 2 | 1 | 3 |
| 4 | FW | 27 | (Uruguay) Facundo Boné | 3 | 0 | 3 |
| 5 | DF | 6 | (Uruguay) Williams Martínez | 2 | 0 | 2 |
| 5 | MF | - | (Uruguay) Agustín Gutiérrez | 2 | 0 | 2 |
| 6 | DF | 7 | (Uruguay) Nicolás Rodríguez | 1 | 0 | 1 |
| 6 | MF | 10 | (Uruguay) Matías Jones | 1 | 0 | 1 |
| 6 | FW | 17 | (Uruguay) Mauro Da Luz | 1 | 0 | 1 |
| 6 | FW | 28 | (Uruguay) José Neris | 1 | 0 | 1 |
| 6 | DF | - | (Uruguay) Diego Rodríguez | 1 | 0 | 1 |
| - | Own goals | - | - | 2 | 0 | 2 |
| Total | | | | 37 | 5 | 42 |

=== Disciplinary record ===
Last updated on Dec 5,2017

| No. | Pos | Nat | Name | Primera División | | | Torneo Intermedio | | | Total | | |
| No. | Pos | Nat | Name | Yellow card | (yellow card) (yellow-red card) | Red card | Yellow card | (yellow card) (yellow-red card) | Red card | Yellow card | (yellow card) (yellow-red card) | Red card |
Goalkeepers
| 1 | GK | (Uruguay) | Nicola Pérez | 1 | 0 | 0 | 2 | 0 | 0 | 3 | 0 | 0 |
| 25 | GK | (Uruguay) | Gastón Olveira | 0 | 0 | 0 | 1 | 0 | 0 | 1 | 0 | 0 |
Defenders
| 2 | DF | (Uruguay) | Agustín Ale | 5 | 0 | 1 | 3 | 1 | 0 | 8 | 1 | 1 |
| 3 | DF | (Uruguay) | Deivis Barone | 1 | 0 | 0 | 0 | 0 | 0 | 1 | 0 | 0 |
| 7 | DF | (Uruguay) | Nicolás Rodríguez | 3 | 0 | 0 | 2 | 0 | 0 | 5 | 0 | 0 |
| 13 | DF | (Uruguay) | Williams Martínez | 6 | 0 | 1 | 1 | 0 | 0 | 7 | 0 | 1 |
| 14 | DF | (Uruguay) | Iván Silva | 2 | 0 | 0 | 1 | 0 | 0 | 3 | 0 | 0 |
| 20 | DF | (Uruguay) | Giovanni González | 6 | 0 | 0 | 1 | 0 | 0 | 7 | 0 | 0 |
| 22 | DF | (Uruguay) | Claudio Herrera | 7 | 0 | 0 | 0 | 1 | 0 | 7 | 1 | 0 |
| 30 | DF | (Uruguay) | Diego Rodríguez | 1 | 0 | 0 | 0 | 0 | 0 | 1 | 0 | 0 |
Midfielders
| 5 | MF | (Uruguay) | Facundo Ospitaleche | 4 | 0 | 0 | 0 | 0 | 0 | 4 | 0 | 0 |
| 8 | MF | (Uruguay) | Bruno Piñatares | 6 | 0 | 0 | 0 | 0 | 0 | 6 | 0 | 0 |
| 10 | MF | (Uruguay) | Matías Jones | 4 | 0 | 0 | 2 | 0 | 0 | 6 | 0 | 0 |
| 16 | MF | (Uruguay) | Gonzalo Vega | 3 | 0 | 0 | 1 | 0 | 0 | 4 | 0 | 0 |
| 18 | MF | (Uruguay) | Fabricio Fernández | 3 | 1 | 0 | 2 | 0 | 0 | 5 | 1 | 0 |
| 28 | MF | (Uruguay) | José Neris | 2 | 0 | 0 | 0 | 0 | 0 | 2 | 0 | 0 |
Forwards
| 13 | FW | (Uruguay) | Ezequiel Peña | 0 | 0 | 0 | 1 | 0 | 0 | 1 | 0 | 0 |
| 17 | FW | (Uruguay) | Mauro Da Luz | 3 | 0 | 0 | 0 | 0 | 0 | 3 | 0 | 0 |
| 19 | FW | (Uruguay) | Juan Manuel Olivera | 5 | 0 | 0 | 0 | 0 | 0 | 5 | 0 | 0 |
| 21 | FW | (Uruguay) | Alexander Rosso | 1 | 0 | 0 | 3 | 0 | 0 | 4 | 0 | 0 |
| 23 | FW | (Uruguay) | Mathías Saavedra | 6 | 1 | 0 | 1 | 0 | 0 | 7 | 1 | 0 |
| 27 | FW | (Uruguay) | Facundo Boné | 1 | 0 | 0 | 0 | 0 | 0 | 1 | 0 | 0 |
Players transferred out during the season
| | MF | (Uruguay) | Fernando Gorriarán | 1 | 0 | 0 | 0 | 0 | 0 | 1 | 0 | 0 |
| | MF | (Uruguay) | Joaquín Noy | 1 | 0 | 0 | 1 | 0 | 0 | 2 | 0 | 0 |
| | FW | (Uruguay) | Nicolás Machado | 1 | 0 | 0 | 0 | 0 | 0 | 1 | 0 | 0 |
| | MF | (Uruguay) | Agustín Gutiérrez | 0 | 0 | 0 | 1 | 0 | 0 | 1 | 0 | 0 |
| Total | | | | 73 | 2 | 2 | 22 | 2 | 0 | 95 | 4 | 2 |

== Primera División ==
=== Apertura 2017 ===
==== League table ====
| Pos | Team | Pld | W | D | L | GF | GA | GD | Pts |
|---|---|---|---|---|---|---|---|---|---|
| 8 | Danubio | 15 | 4 | 7 | 4 | 17 | 16 | +1 | 19 |
| 9 | El Tanque Sisley | 15 | 6 | 1 | 8 | 20 | 29 | −9 | 19 |
| 10 | River Plate | 15 | 4 | 6 | 5 | 14 | 17 | −3 | 18 |
| 11 | Fénix | 15 | 4 | 4 | 7 | 21 | 20 | +1 | 16 |
| 12 | Racing | 15 | 4 | 3 | 8 | 16 | 23 | −7 | 15 |

Source: AUF, Soccerway
Rules for classification: 1) Points, 2) Playoff game, in case two teams are tied in points for first place.
If there are more than two teams tied in points: 2) Goal difference, 3) Goals for, 4) Head-to-head record, 5) Drawing of lots, 6) Playoff game in case two teams are tied in points for first place

==== Results by round ====
| Round | 1 | 2 | 3 | 4 | 5 | 6 | 7 | 8 | 9 | 10 | 11 | 12 | 13 | 14 | 15 |
|---|---|---|---|---|---|---|---|---|---|---|---|---|---|---|---|
| Ground | H | A | H | A | H | A | H | A | H | A | H | H | A | H | A |
| Result | D | L | L | D | D | L | L | W | W | D | W | W | D | L | D |
| Position | 7 | 14 | 14 | 14 | 13 | 16 | 16 | 14 | 11 | 11 | 9 | 9 | 8 | 9 | 10 |

A = Away; H = Home; W = Win; D = Draw; L = Loss

==== Matches ====
Win Draw Loss Postponed

| February 5, 2017 1 | River Plate | 1-1 | Liverpool | Montevideo |
| 17:00 UTC−3 | N. Rodríguez 19'; González (yellow card) 16'; Silva (yellow card) 46'; W. Martínez (yellow card) 54' | Report | Royón 10'; Latorre (yellow card) 35'; Sención (yellow card) 59'; Almeida (yellow card) 65'; Cantera (yellow card) 66'; F. Martínez (yellow card) 75' | Stadium: Parque Federico O. Saroldi; Referee: Daniel Fedorczuk |

| February 12, 2017 2 | Boston River | 2-0 | River Plate | Montevideo |
| 17:00 UTC−3 | F. Rodríguez 49'; Sosa 79'; Pereyra (yellow card) 6' | Report | Martínez (yellow card) 55'; Noy (yellow card) 70'; Saavedra (yellow card) 82' | Stadium: Estadio José Nasazzi; Referee: Diego Riveiro |

| February 19, 2017 3 | River Plate | 1-2 | Wanderers | Montevideo |
| 17:00 UTC−3 | Gorriarán 41'; Saavedra (yellow card) 51'; Da Luz (yellow card) 78' | Report | Blanco 7'; Palacios 72'; Morales (yellow card) 47'; Castro (yellow card) 80'; Colombino (yellow card) 90+2' | Stadium: Parque Federico O. Saroldi; Referee: Federico Arman |

| March 29, 2017 4^{1} | Nacional | 0-0 | River Plate | Montevideo |
| 20:00 UTC−3 | Polenta (yellow card) 62'; S. Rodríguez (yellow card) 77'; García (yellow card) 89' | Report | Herrera (yellow card) 19'; Jones (yellow card) 64' | Stadium: Parque Alfredo V. Viera; Referee: Fernando Falce |

1: Match was suspended due to an aggression on a member of the ticket office personnel .

| March 4, 2017 5 | River Plate | 0-0 | Fénix | Montevideo |
| 16:30 UTC−3 | Fernández (yellow card) 40' (yellow-red card) 90+3' | Report | Canobbio (yellow card) 36'; Torrejón (yellow card) 57' (yellow-red card) 59' | Stadium: Parque Federico O. Saroldi; Referee: Pablo Giménez |

| March 11, 2017 6 | Rampla Juniors | 3-0 | River Plate | Montevideo |
| 16:30 UTC−3 | Silva 53' 70'; S. González 43'; De León (yellow card) 52'; Montero (yellow card) 57'; Odriozola (yellow card) 63' | Report | Martínez (yellow card) 78' | Stadium: Estadio Olímpico; Referee: Adrián Pereira |

| March 11, 2017 7 | River Plate | 0-1 | Defensor Sporting | Montevideo |
| 16:30 UTC−3 | Ale (yellow card) 18'; Fernández (yellow card) 37' | Report | Gómez 78'; Rabuñal (yellow card) 7'; Lamas (yellow card) 11'; Suárez (yellow card) 41' (yellow-red card) 57'; Zunino (yellow card) 89' | Stadium: Parque Federico O. Saroldi; Referee: Daniel Rodríguez |

| March 26, 2017 8 | Sud América | 1-2 | River Plate | Montevideo |
| 16:30 UTC−3 | Pollero 16'; Perujo (yellow card) 28'; Giménez (yellow card) 30'; Felipe (red card) 88'; Melazzi (yellow card) 89'; Camargo (yellow card) 90+1' | Report | Gorriarán 50'; Gutiérrez 60'; Ale (yellow card) 34'; Saavedra (yellow card) 68'; González (yellow card) 84'; Herrera (yellow card) 87' | Stadium: Parque Palermo; Referee: Héctor Martínez |

| April 2, 2017 9 | River Plate | 2-1 | Juventud | Montevideo |
| 16:00 UTC−3 | Gorriarán 24'; Agustín Gutiérrez 37'; Silva (yellow card) 79' | Report | Varela 45'; Albín (yellow card) 1'; Zazpe (yellow card) 53' | Stadium: Parque Federico O. Saroldi; Referee: Gustavo Tejera |

| April 9, 2017 10 | Danubio | 0-0 | River Plate | Montevideo |
| 16:00 UTC−3 | Graví (yellow card) 27'; L. Fernández (yellow card) 32'; Peña (yellow card) 37'; Olaza (yellow card) 89' | Report | Rosso (yellow card) 37'; Gorriarán (yellow card) 39'; Jones (yellow card) 67' | Stadium: Jardínes del Hipódromo; Referee: Javier Bentancor |

| April 15, 2017 11 | River Plate | 3-1 | Plaza Colonia | Montevideo |
| 16:00 UTC−3 | Rosso 47'; Jones 63'; Da Luz 90'; F. Fernández (yellow card) 30'; Herrera (yellow card) 79' | Report | Padula 67'; Díaz (yellow card) 16'; Guirín (yellow card) 45+1'; Castellanos (yellow card) 64'; Puppo (yellow card) 76'; Colo (yellow card) 78'; R. Fernández (yellow card) 82' | Stadium: Parque Federico O. Saroldi; Referee: Esteban Ostojich |

| April 22, 2017 12 | River Plate | 1-0 | Cerro | Montevideo |
| 15:30 UTC−3 | Saavedra 63'; Da Luz (yellow card) 88' | Report | Barboza (yellow card) 5'; Irrazábal (red card) 28'; G. Rodríguez (yellow card) 39' (yellow-red card) 90+4' | Stadium: Parque Federico O. Saroldi; Referee: Daniel Fedorczuk |

| April 29, 2017 13 | Peñarol | 1-1 | River Plate | Montevideo |
| 19:00 UTC−3 | Affonso 33'; J. Arias (yellow card) 43'; Nández (yellow card) 45'; R. Arias (yellow card) 48'; Cavallini (yellow card) 88' | Report | Saavedra 79' (yellow card) 64' (yellow-red card) 80'; Vega (yellow card) 77'; Herrera (yellow card) 82' | Stadium: Campeón del Siglo; Referee: Gustavo Tejera |

| May 6, 2017 14 | River Plate | 1-2 | Racing | Montevideo |
| 15:30 UTC−3 | D.Rodríguez 21'; Machado (yellow card) 88' | Report | Romero 11'; Alvite 63'; Pereira (yellow card) 21'; Lacoste (yellow card) 41'; Méndez (yellow card) 78'; Malvino (yellow card) 86' | Stadium: Parque Federico O. Saroldi; Referee: Pablo Giménez |

| May 14, 2017 15 | El Tanque Sisley | 2-2 | River Plate | Montevideo |
| 15:30 UTC−3 | Fosgt 40'; Menentiel 77'; G. Martínez (yellow card) 27'; Rocaniere (yellow card) 61'; Fagúndez (yellow card) 65'; Noble (red card) 89' | Report | Fosgt 30' (o.g.); Rosso 48'; W. Martínez (yellow card) 28'; Herrera (yellow card) 54'; Saavedra (yellow card) 63' | Stadium: Obdulio Varela; Referee: Jonhatan Fuentes |

=== Torneo Intermedio (Group B) ===
==== Group table ====
| Pos | Team | Pld | W | D | L | GF | GA | GD | Pts | Qualification |
|---|---|---|---|---|---|---|---|---|---|---|
| 1 | Nacional | 7 | 6 | 1 | 0 | 16 | 5 | +11 | 19 | Advance to Torneo Intermedio Final |
| 2 | Montevideo Wanderers | 7 | 5 | 2 | 0 | 9 | 3 | +6 | 17 | |
| 3 | Racing | 7 | 4 | 1 | 2 | 8 | 6 | +2 | 13 | |
| 4 | Cerro | 7 | 2 | 2 | 3 | 7 | 8 | −1 | 8 | |
| 5 | Danubio (Note: Danubio were awarded two points and Sud América were deducted one point due to a breach of rules by Sud América manager Damián Timpani during the Torneo Intermedio match between both teams.) | 7 | 1 | 2 | 4 | 5 | 9 | −4 | 7 | |
| 6 | Juventud | 7 | 1 | 3 | 3 | 5 | 8 | −3 | 6 | |
| 7 | Sud América | 7 | 1 | 2 | 4 | 6 | 11 | −5 | 4 | |
| 8 | River Plate | 7 | 0 | 3 | 4 | 5 | 11 | −6 | 3 | |

Source: AUF, Soccerway
Rules for classification: 1) Points, 2) Playoff game, in case two teams are tied in points for first place.
If there are more than two teams tied in points: 2) Goal difference, 3) Goals for, 4) Head-to-head record, 5) Drawing of lots, 6) Playoff game in case two teams are tied in points for first place

==== Results by round ====
| Round | 1 | 2 | 3 | 4 | 5 | 6 | 7 |
|---|---|---|---|---|---|---|---|
| Ground | A | H | A | H | A | H | A |
| Result | L | L | L | D | D | L | D |
| Position | 6 | 7 | 8 | 7 | 7 | 8 | 8 |

A = Away; H = Home; W = Win; D = Draw; L = Loss

==== Matches ====
Win Draw Loss Postponed

| May 26, 2017 1 | Nacional | 2-1 | River Plate | Montevideo |
| 19:00 UTC−3 | Polenta 15'; Aguirre 90+1' (yellow card) 90+2'; Romero (yellow card) 17' | Report | Gorriarán 41'; Ale (yellow card) 30'; N. Rodríguez (yellow card) 34'; Noy (yellow card) 88' | Stadium: Gran Parque Central; Referee: Pablo Giménez |

| June 4, 2017 2 | River Plate | 0-2 | Sud América | Montevideo |
| 15:00 UTC−3 | Pérez (yellow card) 30'; Ale (yellow card) 34'; W. Martínez (yellow card) 63'; Herrera (red card) 84' | Report | Melazzi 9'; Giménez 31'; Colman (yellow card) 6' | Stadium: Parque Federico O. Saroldi; Referee: Antonio García |

| June 10, 2017 3 | Juventud | 1-0 | River Plate | Las Piedras |
| 15:00 UTC−3 | Mosquera 90+1'; Macaluso (yellow card) 10'; Alles (yellow card) 52'; Albin (red card) 58' | Report | | Stadium: Parque Artigas; Referee: Oscar Rojas |

| June 17, 2017 4 | River Plate | 1-1 | Cerro | Montevideo |
| 15:00 UTC−3 | Herrera 88'; N. Rodríguez (yellow card) 32'; Jones (yellow card) 41'; Peña (yellow card) 66'; Ale (yellow card) 69' (red card) 82'; Rosso (yellow card) 89'; Olveira (yellow card) 90+3' | Report | Franco 90+2'; Izquierdo (yellow card) 71'; Tancredi (yellow card) 73'; G. Rodríguez (yellow card) 84'; Pellejero (yellow card) 90+1' | Stadium: Parque Federico O. Saroldi; Referee: Fernando Falce |

| June 25, 2017 5 | Wanderers | 2-2 | River Plate | Montevideo |
| 15:00 UTC−3 | Palacios 9' 14'; S. Martínez (yellow card) 51'; Blanco (yellow card) 79'; Barrandeguy (yellow card) 84' | Report | Herrera 45'; Saavedra 74'; Silva (yellow card) 14'; Fernández (yellow card) 65'; González (yellow card) 81'; Vega (yellow card) 87' | Stadium: Parque Alfredo V. Viera; Referee: Christian Ferreyra |

| July 1, 2017 6 | River Plate | 0-2 | Danubio | Montevideo |
| 15:00 UTC−3 | Fernández (yellow card) 32'; Rosso (yellow card) 62'; Saavedra (yellow card) 71' | Report | A. Peña 41'; Olaza 76'; G. González Pereyra (yellow card) 80' | Stadium: Parque Federico O. Saroldi; Referee: Andrés Cunha |

| July 9, 2017 7 | Racing | 1-1 | River Plate | Montevideo |
| 15:00 UTC−3 | Alvite 30'; Malvino (yellow card) 10'; Romero (yellow card) 11'; Bonifazi (yellow card) 21'; Méndez (yellow card) 81' | Report | Vega 55'; Rosso (yellow card) 18'; Jones (yellow card) 64'; Gutiérrez (yellow card) 79' | Stadium: Parque Osvaldo Roberto; Referee: Danilo Giménez |

=== Clausura 2017 ===
==== League table ====
| Pos | Team | Pld | W | D | L | GF | GA | GD | Pts |
|---|---|---|---|---|---|---|---|---|---|
| 2 | Defensor Sporting | 15 | 10 | 3 | 2 | 27 | 17 | +10 | 33 |
| 3 | Nacional | 15 | 9 | 2 | 4 | 29 | 15 | +14 | 29 |
| 4 | River Plate | 15 | 6 | 6 | 3 | 23 | 16 | +7 | 24 |
| 5 | Sud América | 15 | 6 | 4 | 5 | 26 | 24 | +2 | 22 |
| 6 | Danubio | 15 | 5 | 5 | 5 | 18 | 24 | −6 | 20 |

Source: AUF, Soccerway
Rules for classification: 1) Points, 2) Playoff game, in case two teams are tied in points for first place.
If there are more than two teams tied in points: 2) Goal difference, 3) Goals for, 4) Head-to-head record, 5) Drawing of lots, 6) Playoff game in case two teams are tied in points for first place

==== Results by round ====
| Round | 1 | 2 | 3 | 4 | 5 | 6 | 7 | 8 | 9 | 10 | 11 | 12 | 13 | 14 | 15 |
|---|---|---|---|---|---|---|---|---|---|---|---|---|---|---|---|
| Ground | A | H | A | H | A | H | A | H | A | H | A | A | H | A | H |
| Result | W | D | D | W | D | W | L | L | L | D | W | D | W | D | W |
| Position | 1 | 2 | 6 | 3 | 3 | 3 | 4 | 6 | 6 | 8 | 6 | 4 | 4 | 4 | 4 |

A = Away; H = Home; W = Win; D = Draw; L = Loss

==== Matches ====
Win Draw Loss Postponed

| August 20, 2017 1 | Liverpool | 0-4 | River PlateC | Montevideo |
| 15:30 UTC−3 | Acosta (yellow card) 69'; Viera (yellow card) 72' | Report | Herrera 45'; Boné 55'; Olivera 76' 83'; W. Martínez (yellow card) 18' | Stadium: Belvedere; Referee: Andrés Cunha |

| August 26, 2017 2 | River Plate | 1-1 | Boston River | Montevideo |
| 15:30 UTC−3 | Neris 86'; Herrera (yellow card) 12'; Olivera (yellow card) 29'; Ospitaleche (yellow card) 35'; Piñatares (yellow card) 72' | Report | Gurri 37' (yellow card) 24'; Pereyra (yellow card) 42'; Fratta (yellow card) 45+1' | Stadium: Saroldi; Referee: Adrián Pereira |

| September 2, 2017 3 | Wanderers | 2-2 | River Plate | Montevideo |
| 16:00 UTC−3 | Bellini 45'; Colombino (yellow card) 2' (yellow-red card) 89'; Viega 55'; Lima (yellow card) 33'; Gularte (yellow card) 63'; Macaluso (yellow card) 66'; Barrendeguy (yellow card) 90+3' | Report | Olivera 14' (yellow card) 49'; G. González 53'; Ospitaleche (yellow card) 61'; Ale (yellow card) 63'; Neris (yellow card) 77' | Stadium: Viera; Referee: Esteban Ostojich |

| September 12, 2017 4 | River Plate | 2-1 | Nacional | Montevideo |
| 16:00 UTC−3 | Silveira 51' (o.g.); G. González 86'; Piñatares (yellow card) 45+1' | Report | Silveira 12'; Rogel (yellow card) 24'; Viña (yellow card) 72' | Stadium: Saroldi; Referee: Javier Bentancor |

| September 16, 2017 5 | Fénix | 0-0 | River Plate | Montevideo |
| 16:00 UTC−3 | Cabrera (yellow card) 49'; R. González (yellow card) 63'; Laens (yellow card) 90' | Report | Ospitaleche (yellow card) 80' | Stadium: Capurro; Referee: Andrés Matonte |

| September 23, 2017 6 | River Plate | 3-1 | Rampla Juniors | Montevideo |
| 16:00 UTC−3 | Boné 6'; Olivera 40' (yellow card) 71'; Rosso 90'; G. González (yellow card) 58'; Pérez (yellow card) 58'; Vega (yellow card) 67'; Neris (yellow card) 74' | Report | Silva 17' (yellow card) 35'; Techera (yellow card) 51'; Rocha (yellow card) 58'; Odriozola (yellow card) 58'; Soto (yellow card) 83' | Stadium: Saroldi; Referee: Diego Riveiro |

| October 14, 2017 7 | Defensor Sporting | 2-1 | River Plate | Montevideo |
| 15:30 UTC−3 | López 75' (yellow card) 90+5'; Correa 90+1' (yellow card) 57'; Carneiro (yellow card) 26'; Rodríguez (yellow card) 42'; Cougo (yellow card) 45'; Cabrera (yellow card) 51' | Report | González 17' (yellow card) 45'; Piñatares (yellow card) 32'; Herrera (yellow card) 84' | Stadium: Franzini; Referee: Jonathan Fuentes |

| November 4, 2017 8 | River Plate | 1-2 | Sud América | Montevideo |
| 16:30 UTC−3 | Olivera 49'; Rodríguez (yellow card) 71'; Ospitaleche (yellow card) 76'; Ale (red card) 79'; Martínez (red card) 80'; Jones (yellow card) 80' | Report | Bentancourt 2'; Colman 54'; Píriz (yellow card) 24' (yellow-red card) 67'; Perujo (yellow card) 60' (yellow-red card) 80' | Stadium: Saroldi; Referee: Oscar Rojas |

| November 8, 2017 9 | Juventud | 1-0 | River Plate | Las Piedras |
| 17:00 UTC−3 | Malán 78'; Reyes (yellow card) 12'; Abascal (yellow card) 63'; Muñoz (yellow card) 89'; Acosta (yellow card) 89'; Romero (yellow card) 90+2' | Report | G. González (yellow card) 17'; Boné (yellow card) 48'; Piñatares (yellow card) 60'; Barone (yellow card) 65' | Stadium: Parque Artigas; Referee: Christian Ferreyra |

| November 11, 2017 10 | River Plate | 1-1 | Danubio | Montevideo |
| 17:00 UTC−3 | Martínez 6'; Ale (yellow card) 67'; N. Pérez (yellow card) 71'; Olivera (yellow card) 85' | Report | Terans 17'; R. Fernández (yellow card) 62'; G. González Pereyra (yellow card) 63'; Tabárez (yellow card) 71'; R. Rodríguez (yellow card) 71' | Stadium: Saroldi; Referee: Diego Riveiro |

| November 15, 2017 11 | Plaza Colonia | 2-3 | River Plate | Colonia del Sacramento |
| 19:00 UTC−3 | López 90' 90+3'; Silva (yellow card) 63'; Miranda (yellow card) 78' | Report | Saavedra 29' 59'; Martínez 31'; Piñatares (yellow card) 80'; Da Luz (yellow card) 88' | Stadium: Supicci; Referee: Andrés Cunha |

| November 18, 2017 12 | Cerro | 2-2 | River Plate | Montevideo |
| 17:00 UTC−3 | Franco 26' 74'; López (yellow card) 38'; Flores (yellow card) 79' | Report | Saavedra 61'; Vega 75'; Fernández (yellow card) 52'; N. Rodríguez (yellow card) 73' | Stadium: Tróccoli; Referee: Yimmy Álvarez |

| November 22, 2017 13 | River Plate | 2-1 | Peñarol | Montevideo |
| 17:00 UTC−3 | Vega 42' (yellow card) 54'; Boné 64'; Ale (yellow card) 83'; N. Rodríguez (yellow card) 89'; Saavedra (yellow card) 90' | Report | M. Rodríguez 84'; Núñez (yellow card) 74'; Hernández (yellow card) 83' | Stadium: Saroldi; Referee: Christian Ferreyra |

| November 26, 2017 14 | Racing | 0-0 | River Plate | Montevideo |
| 17:00 UTC−3 | Quiñones (yellow card) 12'; Sosa (yellow card) 49' | Report | Piñatares (yellow card) 57'; Martínez (yellow card) 61'; D. Rodríguez (yellow card) 85'; González (yellow card) 87' | Stadium: Roberto; Referee: Jonathan Fuentes |

| December 3, 2017 15 | River Plate | 1-0 | El Tanque Sisley | Montevideo |
| 17:00 UTC−3 | Saavedra 14' (yellow card) 75'; Jones (yellow card) 24' | Report | Tamareo (yellow card) 22'; Fosgt (yellow card) 80' | Stadium: Saroldi; Referee: Gustavo Tejera |

=== Overall ===
==== League table ====
| Pos | Team | Pld | W | D | L | GF | GA | GD | Pts | Qualification |
|---|---|---|---|---|---|---|---|---|---|---|
| 1 | Peñarol (C) | 37 | 26 | 8 | 3 | 85 | 26 | +59 | 86 | Qualification to Championship playoff and Copa Libertadores group stage |
| 2 | Defensor Sporting | 37 | 26 | 8 | 3 | 67 | 37 | +30 | 86 | Qualification to Championship playoff and Copa Libertadores group stage |
| 3 | Nacional | 37 | 26 | 5 | 6 | 71 | 35 | +36 | 83 | Qualification to Copa Libertadores second stage |
| 4 | Montevideo Wanderers | 37 | 16 | 7 | 14 | 56 | 53 | +3 | 55 | Qualification to Copa Libertadores first stage |
| 5 | Cerro | 37 | 15 | 8 | 14 | 50 | 50 | 0 | 53 | Qualification to Copa Sudamericana first stage (Note: Since the Torneo Intermedio winners, Nacional, qualified for South American competition based on their aggregate table position, the spot awarded to the Torneo Intermedio winner (Copa Sudamericana first stage) was passed to the next best-placed team, in this case to the eighth-placed team.) |
| 6 | Boston River | 37 | 15 | 7 | 15 | 43 | 39 | +4 | 52 | Qualification to Copa Sudamericana first stage |
| 7 | Rampla Juniors | 37 | 13 | 11 | 13 | 42 | 50 | −8 | 50 | Qualification to Copa Sudamericana first stage |
| 8 | Danubio (Note: Danubio were awarded two points and Sud América were deducted one point due to a breach of rules by Sud América manager Damián Timpani during the Torneo Intermedio match between both teams.) | 37 | 10 | 14 | 13 | 40 | 49 | −9 | 46 | Qualification to Copa Sudamericana first stage |
| 9 | River Plate | 37 | 10 | 15 | 12 | 42 | 44 | −2 | 45 | |
| 10 | Racing | 37 | 12 | 9 | 16 | 42 | 51 | −9 | 45 | |
| 11 | Fénix | 37 | 10 | 12 | 15 | 46 | 47 | −1 | 42 | |
| 12 | Liverpool | 37 | 9 | 10 | 18 | 44 | 58 | −14 | 37 | |
| 13 | El Tanque Sisley | 37 | 9 | 10 | 18 | 41 | 64 | −23 | 37 | |
| 14 | Sud América | 37 | 9 | 9 | 19 | 50 | 69 | −19 | 35 | |
| 15 | Juventud | 37 | 7 | 10 | 20 | 38 | 59 | −21 | 31 | |
| 16 | Plaza Colonia | 37 | 6 | 11 | 20 | 32 | 57 | −25 | 29 | |

Source: AUF
Rules for classification: 1) Points, 2) Playoff game, in case two teams are tied in points for first place.
If there are more than two teams tied in points: 2) Goal difference, 3) Goals for, 4) Head-to-head record, 5) Drawing of lots, 6) Playoff game in case two teams are tied in points for first place
(C) Champions
