= 2020 Uruguayan Segunda División season =

Segunda División
- Season: 2020
- Champions: Cerrito
- Promoted: Cerrito; Villa Española; Sud América
- Relegated: Tacuarembó
- Goals: 322

The 2020 Uruguayan Segunda División was the season of second division professional of football in Uruguay. A total of 12 teams competed; the top two teams and the winner of the Championship play-offs were promoted to the Uruguayan Primera División.

== Club information ==
Club	City	Stadium	Capacity
Albion	Montevideo	Parque Enrique Falco	2,000
Atenas	San Carlos	Atenas	6,000
Central Español	Montevideo	Parque Palermo	6,500
Cerrito	Montevideo	Parque Maracaná	8,000
Juventud	Las Piedras	Parque Artigas	12,000
Racing	Montevideo	Osvaldo Roberto	8,500
Rampla Juniors	Montevideo	Olímpico	9,500
Rocha	Rocha	Doctor Mario Sobrero	10,000
Sud América	Minas	Juan Antonio Lavalleja	8,000
Tacuarembó	Tacuarembó	Estadio Goyenola	12,000
Villa Española	Montevideo	Obdulio Varela	8,000
Villa Teresa	Montevideo	José Nasazzi	5,002

== Standings ==
Pos	Team	Pld	W	D	L	GF	GA	GD	Pts	Promotion or relegation
1	Cerrito	22	11	8	3	38	23	+15	41	Promotion to 2021 Primera División
2	Villa Española	22	10	7	5	35	24	+11	37	Promotion to 2021 Primera División
3	Juventud	22	7	11	4	24	17	+7	32	Qualification to Promotion Playoffs
4	Rampla Juniors	22	8	8	6	27	23	+4	32	Qualification to Promotion Playoffs
5	Racing	22	7	9	6	25	26	−1	30	Qualification to Promotion Playoffs
6	Sud América	22	7	7	8	30	33	−3	28	Qualification to Promotion Playoffs
7	Central Español	22	7	6	9	25	25	0	27	
8	Rocha	22	6	9	7	20	23	−3	27	
9	Villa Teresa	22	6	8	8	19	29	−10	26	
10	Atenas	22	5	9	8	23	29	−6	24	
11	Tacuarembó	22	6	5	11	19	27	−8	23	
12	Albion	22	5	7	10	22	28	−6	22	

Updated to match(es) played on February 2021. Source: Soccerway
Rules for classification: 1st points; 2nd goal difference; 3rd goals scored; 4th head-to-head points; 5th head-to-head goal difference; 6th head-to-head goals scored. This does not apply to determining the champion. If two or more teams had been tied in point at the end of the tournament, a playoff would have been held at a neutral venue within 72 hours for the championship

=== Promotion Playoffs ===
==== Semi-finals ====
===== First leg =====
3 December 2020

Sud América	2–0	Juventud

3 December 2020

Racing	1–0	Rampla Juniors

===== Second leg =====
19 January 2021

Juventud	1–0	Sud América

9 December 2020

Rampla Juniors	3–0	Racing

==== Finals ====
23 January 2021

Sud América	3–2	Rampla Juniors

29 January 2021

Rampla Juniors	1–2	Sud América

== Relegation ==
Pos	Team	2019 Pts	2020 Pts	Total Pts	Total Pld	Avg	Relegation
1	Villa Española	36	37	73	44	1.659	
2	Cerrito	30	41	71	44	2.088	
3	Juventud	—	32	32	22	1.455	
4	Rampla Juniors	—	32	32	22	1.455	
5	Racing	—	30	30	22	1.364	
6	Sud América	30	28	58	44	1.318	
7	Villa Teresa	28	26	54	44	1.227	
8	Rocha	—	27	27	22	1.227	
9	Atenas	29	24	53	44	1.205	
10	Central Español	24	27	51	44	1.159	
11	Albion	27	22	49	44	1.114	Relegation Playoff Matches
12	Tacuarembó	19	23	42	44	0.955	Relegation to Primera División Amateur

=== Relegation playoff ===
19 January 2021

Albion	3–1	Colón

26 January 2021

Colón	0–4	Albion

== See also ==
- 2020 in Uruguayan football
