= Gastón Alvite =

Uruguayan footballer (born 1996)

Personal information
- Full name: Gastón Rodrigo Alvite Duarte
- Date of birth: 9 March 1996 (age 30)
- Place of birth: Montevideo, Uruguay
- Height: 1.76 m (5 ft 9 in)
- Position: Forward

Team information
- Current team: Albion

Youth career
- Racing Club

Senior career*
Years	Team	Apps	(Gls)
2015–2021	Racing Club	102	(16)
2019	→ Maldonado (loan)	10	(3)
2021–2022	Atenas	2	(0)
2022	Rampla Juniors	9	(0)
2022	Plaza Colonia	3	(0)
2023	Colón		
2023–	Albion	1	(0)
- * Club domestic league appearances and goals as of 19:41, 4 October 2023 (UTC)

Gastón Rodrigo Alvite Duarte (born 9 March 1996) is a Uruguayan footballer who plays as a forward for Albion in the Uruguayan Segunda División Amateur.

== Career ==
Alvite began his professional career with Racing Club in 2015, making his competitive debut on 3 May 2015 in a 4–1 defeat to Rentistas. He began to break into the first team during the 2017 season, before being sent on loan to Deportivo Maldonado for the second half of the 2019 season.

In 2022, after a short stint with Atenas, Alvite moved to Rampla Juniors. In 2023, he joined Colón.

== Career statistics ==
=== Club ===
As of match played 1 October 2022

Appearances and goals by club, season and competition
Club	Season	League			Cup		Other		Total	
Club	Season	Division	Apps	Goals	Apps	Goals	Apps	Goals	Apps	Goals
Racing Club	2014–15	Uruguayan Primera División	1	0	—		—		1	0
Racing Club	2015–16	Uruguayan Primera División	5	1	—		—		5	1
Racing Club	2016	Uruguayan Primera División	6	0	—		—		6	0
Racing Club	2017	Uruguayan Primera División	31	7	—		—		31	7
Racing Club	2018	Uruguayan Primera División	24	1	—		—		24	1
Racing Club	2019	Uruguayan Primera División	7	1	—		—		7	1
Racing Club	2020	Uruguayan Segunda División	19	5	—		1 (Note: Appearance in the Uruguayan Segunda División Promotion Playoffs)	0	20	5
Racing Club	2021	Uruguayan Segunda División	9	1	—		—		9	1
Racing Club	Total		102	16	—		1	0	103	16
Deportivo Maldonado (loan)	2019	Uruguayan Segunda División	10	3	—		—		10	3
Atenas	2021	Uruguayan Segunda División	2	0	—		—		2	0
Rampla Juniors	2022	Uruguayan Segunda División	9	0	—		—		9	0
Plaza Colonia	2022	Uruguayan Primera División	3	0	—		—		3	0
Career total			126	19	—		1	0	127	19
