= List of Montevideo City Torque seasons =

Club Atlético Torque is a Uruguayan professional association football club based in Montevideo, who currently play in the Uruguayan Segunda División. The list covers the period from 2008 (when the club joined the Uruguayan football league system) to the present day.

== Background ==
Club Atlético Torque entered the Uruguayan league pyramid at the third tier, in the Uruguayan Segunda División Amateur. They competed at this level for four years, although contested they also contested a promotion play-off match in their inaugural season, before winning promotion to the Uruguayan Segunda División, at which level they have competed ever since.

As a South American side, a number of Torque's seasons have been based around the principle of Apertura and Clausura tournaments, where the league season is broken into two halves, with a separate league table recorded for each. The exact structure of Uruguayan football has frequently been in flux, meaning that the exact organisation of these tournaments - such as whether teams qualify for promotion based on whole-season form or via success in either of the two halves of the season, and whether automatic promotion places exist or not - has altered several times, as indeed has whether the seasons have been divided up into Apertura and Clausura tournaments in the first place.

== Seasons ==
Correct as of end of the 2019 season

Season	League											Top scorer	
Season	Division	Stage	Pld	W	D	L	GF	GA	Pts	Position	Play-offs	Player(s)	Goals
2008–09	2D Amateur	Apertura	11	3	1	7	10	18	10	9th	Runner-up		
2008–09	2D Amateur	Clausura	11	8	3	0	22	8	27	1st	Runner-up		
2009–10	2D Amateur	Apertura	11	6	3	2	19	9	21	3rd	Did not qualify		
2009–10	2D Amateur	Clausura	11	7	1	3	20	10	22	5th	Did not qualify		
2010–11	2D Amateur	Apertura	12	7	3	2	23	8	24	4th	Did not qualify		
2010–11	2D Amateur	Clausura	11	8	2	1	29	9	26	3rd	Did not qualify		
2011–12	2D Amateur	n/a	25	20	4	1	73	17	64	1st	Not contested		
2012–13	2D Profesional	n/a	26	13	5	8	43	33	44	5th	Runner-up		
2013–14	2D Profesional	n/a	26	2	9	15	27	47	15	14th	Did not qualify	Mathías Saavedra	9
2014–15	2D Profesional	n/a	28	9	8	11	39	49	35	10th	Did not qualify	Wilinton Techera	13
2015–16	2D Profesional	Phase 1, Grp A	7	2	1	4	13	14	7	5th	Not contested	Jonathan Charquero	14
2015–16	2D Profesional	Phase 2	21	8	6	7	39	34	30	6th	Not contested	Jonathan Charquero	14
2016	2D Profesional	n/a	12	4	3	5	13	15	15	6th	Not contested	Hernán Figueredo / Andrés Martiñones Rus	3
2017	2D Profesional	n/a	28	16	8	4	48	23	56	1st	Not contested	Andrés Martiñones Rus	16
2018	Primera	Apertura	15	2	4	9	13	27	10	14th	Not contested	Agustín González Pereira	7
2018	Primera	Intermedio, Serie B	6	4	1	1	10	6	13	1st	Runner-up	Agustín González Pereira	7
2018	Primera	Clausura	15	4	6	5	16	18	18	11th	Not contested	Agustín González Pereira	7
2018	Primera	Final Position (based on average points per game)								14th	Did not qualify	Agustín González Pereira	7
2019	2D Profesional	n/a	22	12	7	3	28	14	43	1st	Not contested	Gustavo del Prete	10
