= List of Swiss football transfers summer 2015 =

This is a list of Swiss football transfers for the 2015 summer transfer window. Only moves featuring Swiss Super League or Swiss Challenge League are listed.

== Swiss Super League ==
=== FC Basel ===
In: Note: Flags indicate national team as defined under FIFA eligibility rules; some limited exceptions apply. Players may hold more than one non-FIFA nationality.

No.	Pos.	Nation	Player
5	DF	SUI	Michael Lang (from (Switzerland) Grasshopper Club Zürich)
8	MF	ISL	Birkir Bjarnason (from (Italy) Delfino Pescara 1936)
22	MF	SRB	Zdravko Kuzmanović (from (Italy) Inter Milan)
26	DF	DEN	Daniel Høegh (from (Denmark) Odense Boldklub)
77	MF	NED	Jean-Paul Boëtius (from (Netherlands) Feyenoord)

Out: Note: Flags indicate national team as defined under FIFA eligibility rules; some limited exceptions apply. Players may hold more than one non-FIFA nationality.

No.	Pos.	Nation	Player
16	DF	SUI	Fabian Schär (to (Germany) 1899 Hoffenheim)
20	MF	SUI	Fabian Frei (to (Germany) 1. FSV Mainz 05)
25	FW	PAR	Derlis González (to (Ukraine) FC Dynamo Kyiv)
26	DF	ARG	Gastón Sauro (to (United States) Columbus Crew SC)

=== Grasshopper Club Zürich ===
In: Note: Flags indicate national team as defined under FIFA eligibility rules; some limited exceptions apply. Players may hold more than one non-FIFA nationality.

No.	Pos.	Nation	Player
3	DF	SRB	Nemanja Antonov (from (Serbia) OFK Beograd)
4	MF	SWE	Kim Källström (from (Russia) FC Spartak Moscow)

Out: Note: Flags indicate national team as defined under FIFA eligibility rules; some limited exceptions apply. Players may hold more than one non-FIFA nationality.

No.	Pos.	Nation	Player
1	GK	IRI	Daniel Davari (to (Germany) Arminia Bielefeld)
4	MF	BIH	Sanel Jahić (to (Greece) Levadiakos F.C.)
5	DF	SUI	Michael Lang (to (Switzerland) FC Basel)
6	MF	HUN	Krisztián Vadócz (to (Spain) Deportivo Alavés)
8	MF	ALB	Amir Abrashi (to (Germany) SC Freiburg)
15	FW	SUI	Nassim Ben Khalifa (to (Turkey) Eskişehirspor)
20	DF	SUI	Daniel Pavlović (on loan to (Italy) Frosinone Calcio)
26	DF	SUI	Ulisses Garcia (to (Germany) Werder Bremen)

=== FC Lugano ===
In: Note: Flags indicate national team as defined under FIFA eligibility rules; some limited exceptions apply. Players may hold more than one non-FIFA nationality.

No.	Pos.	Nation	Player
1	GK	ITA	Alex Valentini (on loan from (Italy) Spezia Calcio)
13	DF	SUI	Frédéric Veseli (from (England) Port Vale F.C.)
18	MF	ITA	Mario Piccinocchi (on loan from (Italy) Vicenza Calcio)
22	FW	GRE	Anastasios Donis (on loan from (Italy) Juventus FC)
36	MF	ITA	Alessandro Mastalli (on loan from (Italy) A.C. Milan)
99	FW	MNE	Đorđe Šušnjar (from (Serbia) FK Jagodina)

Out: Note: Flags indicate national team as defined under FIFA eligibility rules; some limited exceptions apply. Players may hold more than one non-FIFA nationality.

No.	Pos.	Nation	Player
-	FW	URU	Sergio Cortelezzi (to (Switzerland) FC Chiasso)
-	FW	URU	Leonardo Melazzi (to (Switzerland) FC Chiasso)

=== FC Luzern ===
In: Note: Flags indicate national team as defined under FIFA eligibility rules; some limited exceptions apply. Players may hold more than one non-FIFA nationality.

No.	Pos.	Nation	Player
4	DF	GER	Sebastian Schachten (from (Germany) FC St. Pauli)
11	MF	ALB	Migjen Basha (from (Italy) Torino F.C.)
27	DF	GER	Nico Brandenburger (on loan from (Germany) Borussia Mönchengladbach)
28	MF	GER	Clemens Fandrich (from (Germany) RB Leipzig, previously on loan to (Germany) Erzgebirge Aue)
61	FW	GER	Samed Yeşil (on loan from (England) Liverpool F.C.)

Out: Note: Flags indicate national team as defined under FIFA eligibility rules; some limited exceptions apply. Players may hold more than one non-FIFA nationality.

No.	Pos.	Nation	Player
-	MF	SUI	Adrian Winter (to (United States) Orlando City SC)

=== FC Sion ===
In: Note: Flags indicate national team as defined under FIFA eligibility rules; some limited exceptions apply. Players may hold more than one non-FIFA nationality.

No.	Pos.	Nation	Player
9	FW	BEL	Ilombe Mboyo (from (Belgium) K.R.C. Genk)
63	MF	BEL	Geoffrey Mujangi Bia (from (Belgium) Standard Liége)

Out: Note: Flags indicate national team as defined under FIFA eligibility rules; some limited exceptions apply. Players may hold more than one non-FIFA nationality.

No.	Pos.	Nation	Player
-	MF	ALB	Vullnet Basha (to (Spain) SD Ponferradina)
-	MF	SUI	Matteo Fedele (on loan to (Italy) Carpi F.C. 1909)
-	MF	AUS	Dario Vidošić (to (Australia) Western Sydney Wanderers FC)
-	FW	CYP	Demetris Christofi (to (Cyprus) AC Omonia)

=== FC St. Gallen ===
In: Note: Flags indicate national team as defined under FIFA eligibility rules; some limited exceptions apply. Players may hold more than one non-FIFA nationality.

No.	Pos.	Nation	Player
21	MF	CMR	Edgar Salli (on loan from AS Monaco FC)

Out: Note: Flags indicate national team as defined under FIFA eligibility rules; some limited exceptions apply. Players may hold more than one non-FIFA nationality.

No.	Pos.	Nation	Player
-	MF	SUI	Roberto Rodríguez (to (Italy) Novara Calcio)

=== FC Thun ===
In: Note: Flags indicate national team as defined under FIFA eligibility rules; some limited exceptions apply. Players may hold more than one non-FIFA nationality.

No.	Pos.	Nation	Player
6	MF	LIE	Sandro Wieser (from (Germany) 1899 Hoffenheim)

Out: Note: Flags indicate national team as defined under FIFA eligibility rules; some limited exceptions apply. Players may hold more than one non-FIFA nationality.

No.	Pos.	Nation	Player
-	FW	FIN	Berat Sadik (to (Russia) FC Krylia Sovetov Samara)

=== FC Vaduz ===
In: Note: Flags indicate national team as defined under FIFA eligibility rules; some limited exceptions apply. Players may hold more than one non-FIFA nationality.

No.	Pos.	Nation	Player
10	MF	NED	Ali Messaoud (from (Netherlands) Willem II)

Out: Note: Flags indicate national team as defined under FIFA eligibility rules; some limited exceptions apply. Players may hold more than one non-FIFA nationality.

No.	Pos.	Nation	Player
-	GK	SUI	Andreas Hirzel (to (Germany) Hamburger SV)

=== BSC Young Boys ===
In: Note: Flags indicate national team as defined under FIFA eligibility rules; some limited exceptions apply. Players may hold more than one non-FIFA nationality.

No.	Pos.	Nation	Player
7	MF	SRB	Miralem Sulejmani (from (Portugal) S.L. Benfica)
80	DF	SUI	Loris Benito (from (Portugal) S.L. Benfica)

Out: Note: Flags indicate national team as defined under FIFA eligibility rules; some limited exceptions apply. Players may hold more than one non-FIFA nationality.

No.	Pos.	Nation	Player

=== FC Zürich ===
In: Note: Flags indicate national team as defined under FIFA eligibility rules; some limited exceptions apply. Players may hold more than one non-FIFA nationality.

No.	Pos.	Nation	Player
28	DF	BRA	Vinícius Freitas (on loan from (Italy) S.S. Lazio)
33	MF	SUI	Kevin Bua (from (Switzerland) Servette FC)

Out: Note: Flags indicate national team as defined under FIFA eligibility rules; some limited exceptions apply. Players may hold more than one non-FIFA nationality.

No.	Pos.	Nation	Player
-	GK	SUI	David Da Costa (to (Italy) Novara Calcio)
-	DF	SUI	Nico Elvedi (to (Germany) Borussia Mönchengladbach)
-	MF	SUI	Francisco Rodríguez (to (Germany) VfL Wolfsburg)

== Swiss Challenge League ==
=== FC Aarau ===
In: Note: Flags indicate national team as defined under FIFA eligibility rules; some limited exceptions apply. Players may hold more than one non-FIFA nationality.

No.	Pos.	Nation	Player

Out: Note: Flags indicate national team as defined under FIFA eligibility rules; some limited exceptions apply. Players may hold more than one non-FIFA nationality.

No.	Pos.	Nation	Player
23	FW	LAT	Edgars Gauračs (loan return to (Latvia) FK Spartaks Jūrmala)
-	DF	SWE	Richard Magyar (to (Sweden) Hammarby Fotboll)
--	MF	LIE	Sandro Wieser (loan return to (Germany) 1899 Hoffenheim, then sold to (Switzerland) FC Thun)
-	FW	VEN	Frank Feltscher (to (Cyprus) AEL Limassol)

=== FC Biel-Bienne ===
In: Note: Flags indicate national team as defined under FIFA eligibility rules; some limited exceptions apply. Players may hold more than one non-FIFA nationality.

No.	Pos.	Nation	Player
24	MF	BIH	Nikola Popara (from (Serbia) FK Jagodina)
29	FW	SRB	Stefan Mihajlović (from (Serbia) FK Rad)
31	MF	SRB	Luka Luković (from (Serbia) FK Vojvodina)

Out: Note: Flags indicate national team as defined under FIFA eligibility rules; some limited exceptions apply. Players may hold more than one non-FIFA nationality.

No.	Pos.	Nation	Player

=== FC Chiasso ===
In: Note: Flags indicate national team as defined under FIFA eligibility rules; some limited exceptions apply. Players may hold more than one non-FIFA nationality.

No.	Pos.	Nation	Player
2	MF	ITA	Simon Laner (on loan from (Italy) Hellas Verona F.C.)
7	FW	URU	Sergio Cortelezzi (from (Switzerland) FC Lugano)
32	FW	URU	Leonardo Melazzi (from (Switzerland) FC Lugano)

Out: Note: Flags indicate national team as defined under FIFA eligibility rules; some limited exceptions apply. Players may hold more than one non-FIFA nationality.

No.	Pos.	Nation	Player
92	FW	USA	Giuseppe Gentile (on loan to (United States) San Antonio Scorpions)

=== FC Lausanne-Sport ===
In: Note: Flags indicate national team as defined under FIFA eligibility rules; some limited exceptions apply. Players may hold more than one non-FIFA nationality.

No.	Pos.	Nation	Player
7	FW	URU	Walter Pandiani (from (Uruguay) Miramar Misiones)

Out: Note: Flags indicate national team as defined under FIFA eligibility rules; some limited exceptions apply. Players may hold more than one non-FIFA nationality.

No.	Pos.	Nation	Player
-	MF	CGO	Chris Malonga (to (France) Stade Lavallois)

=== FC Le Mont ===
In: Note: Flags indicate national team as defined under FIFA eligibility rules; some limited exceptions apply. Players may hold more than one non-FIFA nationality.

No.	Pos.	Nation	Player

Out: Note: Flags indicate national team as defined under FIFA eligibility rules; some limited exceptions apply. Players may hold more than one non-FIFA nationality.

No.	Pos.	Nation	Player

=== Neuchâtel Xamax ===
In: Note: Flags indicate national team as defined under FIFA eligibility rules; some limited exceptions apply. Players may hold more than one non-FIFA nationality.

No.	Pos.	Nation	Player
22	FW	SUI	Anđelko Savić (from (Italy) U.C. Sampdoria)

Out: Note: Flags indicate national team as defined under FIFA eligibility rules; some limited exceptions apply. Players may hold more than one non-FIFA nationality.

No.	Pos.	Nation	Player

=== FC Schaffhausen ===
In: Note: Flags indicate national team as defined under FIFA eligibility rules; some limited exceptions apply. Players may hold more than one non-FIFA nationality.

No.	Pos.	Nation	Player

Out: Note: Flags indicate national team as defined under FIFA eligibility rules; some limited exceptions apply. Players may hold more than one non-FIFA nationality.

No.	Pos.	Nation	Player

=== FC Wil ===
In: Note: Flags indicate national team as defined under FIFA eligibility rules; some limited exceptions apply. Players may hold more than one non-FIFA nationality.

No.	Pos.	Nation	Player
3	MF	TUR	Selçuk Şahin (from (Turkey) Fenerbahçe S.K.)
4	DF	TUR	Egemen Korkmaz (from (Turkey) Fenerbahçe S.K.)
5	DF	CPV	Guy Ramos (from (Netherlands) Roda JC Kerkrade)
25	GK	GER	Patrick Drewes (on loan from (Germany) VfL Wolfsburg)

Out: Note: Flags indicate national team as defined under FIFA eligibility rules; some limited exceptions apply. Players may hold more than one non-FIFA nationality.

No.	Pos.	Nation	Player
-	MF	FRA	Marko Muslin (to (Switzerland) FC Wohlen)

=== FC Winterthur ===
In: Note: Flags indicate national team as defined under FIFA eligibility rules; some limited exceptions apply. Players may hold more than one non-FIFA nationality.

No.	Pos.	Nation	Player

Out: Note: Flags indicate national team as defined under FIFA eligibility rules; some limited exceptions apply. Players may hold more than one non-FIFA nationality.

No.	Pos.	Nation	Player

=== FC Wohlen ===
In: Note: Flags indicate national team as defined under FIFA eligibility rules; some limited exceptions apply. Players may hold more than one non-FIFA nationality.

No.	Pos.	Nation	Player
17	MF	FRA	Marko Muslin (from (Switzerland) FC Wil 1900)

Out: Note: Flags indicate national team as defined under FIFA eligibility rules; some limited exceptions apply. Players may hold more than one non-FIFA nationality.

No.	Pos.	Nation	Player
