= Javier Méndez (footballer, born 1994) =

Uruguayan footballer

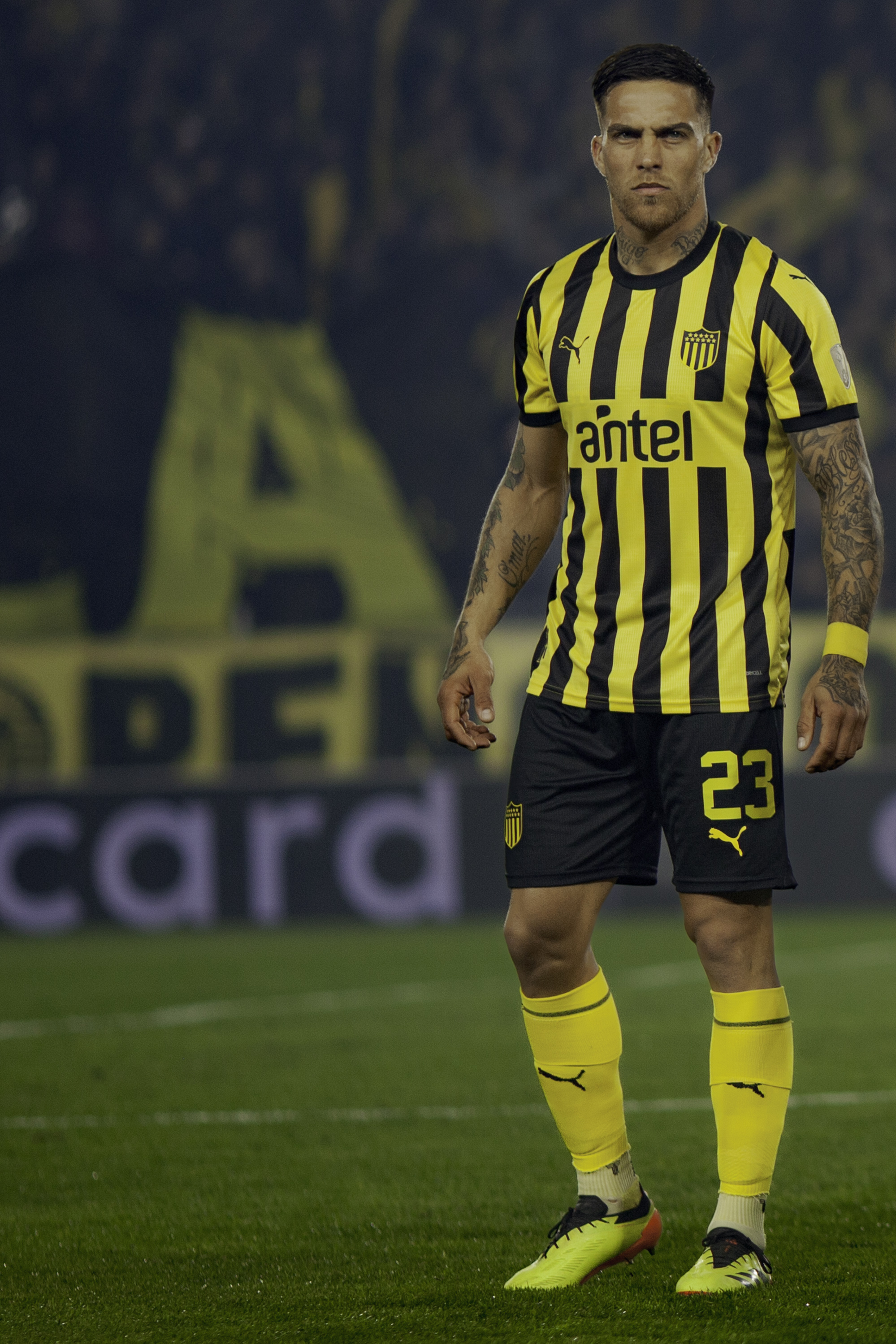
- Méndez with Peñarol in 2024

Personal information
- Full name: Óscar Javier Méndez Albornoz
- Date of birth: 5 December 1994 (age 31)
- Place of birth: Montevideo, Uruguay
- Height: 1.84 m (6 ft 0 in)
- Position: Midfielder

Team information
- Current team: Colo-Colo

Youth career
- Libertad Washington
- River Plate Montevideo
- Racing Montevideo

Senior career*
Years	Team	Apps	(Gls)
2013–2019	Racing Montevideo	81	(2)
2019–2020	Unión Santa Fe	23	(1)
2020–2021	Danubio	34	(3)
2022	Independiente Medellín	30	(1)
2023	Racing Montevideo	15	(1)
2023	América Mineiro	7	(0)
2024–2025	Peñarol	56	(3)
2026–	Colo-Colo	0	(0)
- * Club domestic league appearances and goals as of 13 January 2026

Óscar Javier Méndez Albornoz (born 5 December 1994) is a Uruguayan professional footballer who plays as a midfielder for Chilean club Colo-Colo.

== Career ==
Méndez's career began with Racing Club. He was an unused substitute six times under manager Rosario Martínez during the 2013–14 Uruguayan Primera División season, before making his professional debut on 2 November 2013 in a 1–0 win over Defensor Sporting. In total, Méndez made twenty appearances for Racing Club across his first three campaigns. He scored his first goal for them in November 2016 against River Plate at the Estadio Osvaldo Roberto. On 10 January 2019, Méndez completed a move to Argentine Primera División side Unión Santa Fe.

In January 2026, Méndez moved to Chile and signed with Colo-Colo.

== Career statistics ==
As of 11 January 2019.

Club statistics
Club	Season	League			Cup		Continental		Other		Total	
Club	Season	Division	Apps	Goals	Apps	Goals	Apps	Goals	Apps	Goals	Apps	Goals
Racing Club	2013–14	Uruguayan Primera División	3	0	—		—		0	0	3	0
Racing Club	2014–15	Uruguayan Primera División	1	0	—		—		0	0	1	0
Racing Club	2015–16	Uruguayan Primera División	16	0	—		—		0	0	16	0
Racing Club	2016	Uruguayan Primera División	12	1	—		—		0	0	12	1
Racing Club	2017	Uruguayan Primera División	28	0	—		—		0	0	28	0
Racing Club	2018	Uruguayan Primera División	21	1	—		—		0	0	21	1
Racing Club	Total		81	2	—		—		0	0	81	2
Unión Santa Fe	2018–19	Argentine Primera División	0	0	0	0	0	0	0	0	0	0
Career total			81	2	0	0	0	0	0	0	81	2
