= 2022 Uruguayan Segunda División season =

Segunda División
- Season: 2022
- Promoted: Racing; La Luz; Cerro
- Relegated: Central Español; Villa Española

The 2022 Uruguayan Segunda División was the season of second division professional of football in Uruguay. A total of 12 teams competed; the top two teams and the winner of the Championship play-offs were promoted to the Uruguayan Primera División.

== Club information ==
Club	City	Stadium	Capacity
Atenas	San Carlos	Atenas	6,000
Central Español	Montevideo	Parque Palermo	6,500
Cerro	Montevideo	Luis Trócolli	24,000
Juventud	Las Piedras	Parque Artigas	12,000
La Luz	Montevideo	Julio César Abbadie	2,500
Miramar Misiones	Montevideo	Parque Luis Méndez Piana	6,500
Progreso	Montevideo	Parque Abraham Paladino	8,000
Racing	Montevideo	Osvaldo Roberto	8,500
Rampla Juniors	Montevideo	Olímpico	9,500
Sud América	Minas	Juan Antonio Lavalleja	8,000
Uruguay Montevideo	Montevideo	Parque ANCAP	4,000
Villa Española	Montevideo	Obdulio Varela	8,000

== Torneo Competencia ==
=== Group A ===
Pos	Team	Pld	W	D	L	GF	GA	GD	Pts	Promotion or relegation
1	Racing	5	3	1	1	9	4	+5	10	Qualification for Final
2	Rampla Juniors	5	3	1	1	8	3	+5	10	
3	Miramar Misiones	5	2	2	1	7	7	0	8	
4	Sud América	5	2	1	2	4	5	−1	7	
5	Uruguay Montevideo	5	2	0	3	6	7	−1	6	
6	Central Español	5	0	1	4	2	10	−8	1	

Updated to match(es) played on 2022. Source: Soccerway
Rules for classification: 1st points; 2nd goal difference; 3rd goals scored; 4th head-to-head points; 5th head-to-head goal difference; 6th head-to-head goals scored. This does not apply to determining the champion. If two or more teams had been tied in point at the end of the tournament, a playoff would have been held at a neutral venue within 72 hours for the championship

=== Group B ===
Pos	Team	Pld	W	D	L	GF	GA	GD	Pts	Promotion or relegation
1	La Luz	5	5	0	0	8	2	+6	15	Qualification for Final
2	Progreso	5	3	0	2	6	5	+1	9	
3	Atenas	5	2	1	2	4	4	0	7	
4	Juventud	5	1	2	2	4	5	−1	5	
5	Cerro	5	1	1	3	5	7	−2	4	
6	Villa Española	5	1	0	4	5	9	−4	3	

Updated to match(es) played on 2022. Source: Soccerway
Rules for classification: 1st points; 2nd goal difference; 3rd goals scored; 4th head-to-head points; 5th head-to-head goal difference; 6th head-to-head goals scored. This does not apply to determining the champion. If two or more teams had been tied in point at the end of the tournament, a playoff would have been held at a neutral venue within 72 hours for the championship

=== Final ===
24 April 2022

La Luz	0–2	Racing
		Luis Gorocito 43'; Diego Vera 90+6'

Estadio Centenario, Montevideo

== Fase Regular ==
Pos	Team	Pld	W	D	L	GF	GA	GD	Pts	Promotion or relegation
1	Racing	27	17	6	4	40	18	+22	57	Promotion to 2023 Primera División
2	La Luz	27	14	9	4	35	23	+12	51	Promotion to 2023 Primera División
3	Uruguay Montevideo	27	13	5	9	35	29	+6	44	Qualification to Promotion Playoffs
4	Cerro	27	11	8	8	31	30	+1	41	Qualification to Promotion Playoffs
5	Miramar Misiones	27	10	10	7	38	32	+6	40	Qualification to Promotion Playoffs
6	Rampla Juniors	27	10	5	12	32	31	+1	35	Qualification to Promotion Playoffs
7	Sud América	27	9	6	12	27	38	−11	33	
8	Atenas	27	7	8	12	24	25	−1	32	
9	Progreso	27	7	10	10	23	27	−4	31	
10	Juventud	27	6	9	12	19	28	−9	27	
11	Villa Española	27	7	6	14	27	37	−10	27	
12	Central Español	27	5	10	12	22	35	−13	22	

Updated to match(es) played on 2022. Source: Soccerway
Rules for classification: 1st points; 2nd goal difference; 3rd goals scored; 4th head-to-head points; 5th head-to-head goal difference; 6th head-to-head goals scored. This does not apply to determining the champion. If two or more teams had been tied in point at the end of the tournament, a playoff would have been held at a neutral venue within 72 hours for the championship

== Promotion Playoffs ==
=== Semi-finals ===
==== First leg ====
1 October 2022

Miramar Misiones	0–2	Cerro

2 October 2022

Rampla Juniors	1–0	Uruguay Montevideo

==== Second leg ====
8 October 2022

Cerro	1–3	Miramar Misiones

9 October 2022

Uruguay Montevideo	1–1	Rampla Juniors

=== Finals ===
16 October 2022

Rampla Juniors	0–1	Cerro

23 October 2022

Cerro	0–0	Rampla Juniors

== Relegation ==
Pos	Team	2021 Pts	2022 Pts	Total Pts	Total Pld	Avg	Relegation
1	Racing	38	57	95	49	1.939	
2	La Luz	—	51	51	27	1.889	
3	Cerro	37	41	78	49	1.592	
4	Miramar Misiones	—	40	40	27	1.481	
5	Uruguay Montevideo	25	44	69	49	1.408	
6	Sud América	—	33	33	27	1.222	
7	Progreso	—	31	31	27	1.148	
8	Atenas	24	32	56	49	1.143	
9	Juventud	29	27	56	49	1.143	
10	Rampla Juniors	21	35	56	49	1.143	
11	Central Español	33	22	55	49	1.122	Relegation Playoff Matches
12	Villa Española	—	27	27	27	1	Relegation Playoff Matches

=== Relegation Playoffs ===
==== First leg ====
22 October 2022

Bella Vista	0–1	Villa Española

23 October 2022

Central Español	0–0	Potencia

==== Second leg ====
29 October 2022

Villa Española	0–2	Bella Vista

30 October 2022

Potencia	3–2	Central Español

== See also ==
- 2022 Uruguayan Primera División season
- 2022 Copa Uruguay
