= Nicolás Guirín =

Uruguayan footballer (born 1995)

Nicolás Guirin
Personal information
- Full name: Nicolás Guirin Chialvo
- Date of birth: 7 May 1995 (age 31)
- Place of birth: Nueva Palmira, Uruguay
- Height: 1.84 m (6 ft 0 in)
- Position: Goalkeeper

Team information
- Current team: Uruguay Montevideo

Senior career*
Years	Team	Apps	(Gls)
2014–2023	Plaza Colonia	150	(0)
2023	Unión Española	4	(0)
2024-	Uruguay Montevideo	0	(0)
- * Club domestic league appearances and goals as of 25 February 2024

Nicolás Guirin Chialvo (born 7 May 1995) is an Uruguayan footballer who plays as a goalkeeper for Uruguay Montevideo.

== Career ==
=== Plaza Colonia ===
Born in Nueva Palmira, located within the Colonia Department, Guirin began his professional career with Plaza Colonia. He made his senior debut during the 2014–15 season, appearing in the club's 2–1 defeat to Cerro Largo on 20 September 2014. After several seasons of sporadic appearances, Guirin broke into the first team during the 2017 season, registering 22, 26, and 37 league appearances over the next three seasons.

In December 2021, Guirin rejected a contract offer from Ecuadorian club Guayaquil Sport, electing to remain in Uruguay for family reasons.

=== Unión Española ===
In 2023, he played for Chilean Primera División club Unión Española.

== Personal life ==
In November 2020, Guirin tested positive for COVID-19.

== Career statistics ==
=== Club ===
As of match played 24 March 2023

Appearances and goals by club, season and competition
Club	Season	League			Continental		Other		Total	
Club	Season	Division	Apps	Goals	Apps	Goals	Apps	Goals	Apps	Goals
Plaza Colonia	2014–15	Uruguayan Segunda División	10	0	—		—		10	0
Plaza Colonia	2015–16	Uruguayan Primera División	2	0	—		—		2	0
Plaza Colonia	2016	Uruguayan Primera División	0	0	0	0	—		0	0
Plaza Colonia	2017	Uruguayan Primera División	22	0	—		—		22	0
Plaza Colonia	2018	Uruguayan Segunda División	26	0	—		—		26	0
Plaza Colonia	2019	Uruguayan Primera División	37	0	—		—		37	0
Plaza Colonia	2020	Uruguayan Primera División	3	0	2 (Note: Appearance(s) in Copa Sudamericana)	0	—		5	0
Plaza Colonia	2021	Uruguayan Primera División	10	0	—		—		10	0
Plaza Colonia	2022	Uruguayan Primera División	36	0	2 (Note: Appearance(s) in Copa Libertadores)	0	1 (Note: Appearance(s) in Supercopa Uruguaya)	0	39	0
Plaza Colonia	2023	Uruguayan Primera División	4	0	—		—		4	0
Career total			150	0	4	0	1	0	155	0
