= Adrián Colombino =

Uruguayan footballer (born 1993)

Personal information
- Full name: Adrián Nicolás Colombino Rodríguez
- Date of birth: 12 October 1993 (age 33)
- Place of birth: Flor de Maroñas, Uruguay
- Height: 1.77 m (5 ft 9 1/2 in)
- Position: Central midfielder

Team information
- Current team: Progreso
- Number: 8

Youth career
- Arapey Mendoza
- 2006–2011: Montevideo Wanderers

Senior career*
Years	Team	Apps	(Gls)
2011–2020	Montevideo Wanderers	194	(3)
2019	→ Argentinos Juniors (loan)	0	(0)
2021–2022	AEL	47	(2)
2022	Mushuc Runa	12	(1)
2023	Panserraikos	15	(0)
2024–	Progreso	20	(0)
- * Club domestic league appearances and goals as of 14 September 2024

Adrián Nicolás Colombino Rodríguez (born 12 October 1993) is a Uruguayan professional footballer who plays as a central midfielder for Uruguayan Primera División club Progreso.

== Career ==
Colombino joined Montevideo Wanderers' academy system in 2006, signing from youth team Arapey Mendoza. His professional debut against Liverpool on 9 October 2011 was one of two appearances in 2011–12. Forty-one further appearances followed across two seasons, which preceded Colombino scoring his first senior goal in August 2014 versus River Plate; a ninety-third minute winner at the Estadio Saroldi. He netted goals in the next campaign against Nacional and Peñarol on the way to a total of one hundred and seventy-eight matches in all competitions in eight seasons; placing as runner-ups twice.

On 20 January 2019, Colombino completed a loan move to Argentine Primera División side Argentinos Juniors. He appeared just once for the club, playing the final fourteen minutes of a Copa Argentina win over Torneo Federal A's Douglas Haig on 5 March. Colombino went back to his parent team on 24 June, subsequently participating in July league games with Cerro Largo and Fénix. On 29 December 2020, Colombino agreed a transfer to Greek football with AEL; penning a two-and-a-half-year contract.

== Career statistics ==
As of 15 August 2023.

Club statistics
Club	Season	League			Cup		League Cup		Continental		Other		Total	
Club	Season	Division	Apps	Goals	Apps	Goals	Apps	Goals	Apps	Goals	Apps	Goals	Apps	Goals
Montevideo Wanderers	2011–12	Uruguayan Primera División	2	0	—		—		—		0	0	2	0
Montevideo Wanderers	2012–13	Uruguayan Primera División	16	0	—		—		—		0	0	16	0
Montevideo Wanderers	2013–14	Uruguayan Primera División	20	0	—		—		1 (Note: Appearance(s) in the Copa Sudamericana)	0	3 (Note: Appearance(s) in the Uruguayan Primera División play-offs)	0	24	0
Montevideo Wanderers	2014–15	Uruguayan Primera División	24	1	—		—		2 (Note: Appearance(s) in the Copa Libertadores)	0	0	0	26	1
Montevideo Wanderers	2015–16	Uruguayan Primera División	25	2	—		—		—		0	0	25	2
Montevideo Wanderers	2016	Uruguayan Primera División	10	0	—		—		5	0	0	0	15	0
Montevideo Wanderers	2017	Uruguayan Primera División	33	0	—		—		4	0	0	0	37	0
Montevideo Wanderers	2018	Uruguayan Primera División	31	0	—		—		2	0	0	0	33	0
Montevideo Wanderers	2019	Uruguayan Primera División	15	0	—		—		0	0	0	0	15	0
Montevideo Wanderers	2020	Uruguayan Primera División	18	0	—		—		—		0	0	18	0
Montevideo Wanderers	Total		194	3	—		—		14	0	3	0	211	3
Argentinos Juniors (loan)	2018–19	Argentine Primera División	0	0	1	0	0	0	0	0	0	0	1	0
AEL	2020–21	Superleague Greece	19	1	1	0	—		—		—		20	1
AEL	2021–22	Superleague Greece 2	28	1	4	0	—		—		—		32	1
AEL	Total		47	2	5	0	—		—		—		52	2
Mushuc Runa	2022	Ecuadorian Serie A	12	1	7	0	—		—		—		19	1
Panserraikos	2022–23	Superleague Greece 2	13	0	3	0	—		—		—		16	0
Career total			266	6	16	0	0	0	14	0	3	0	298	6
