= Rodrigo Odriozola =

Uruguayan footballer (born 1988)

Personal information
- Full name: Rodrigo Odriozola López
- Date of birth: 31 August 1988 (age 38)
- Place of birth: Durazno, Uruguay
- Height: 1.85 m (6 ft 1 in)
- Position: Goalkeeper

Team information
- Current team: Huachipato
- Number: 25

Youth career
- Durazno

Senior career*
Years	Team	Apps	(Gls)
2008–2011	Montevideo Wanderers	7	(0)
2011–2012	Racing Montevideo	16	(0)
2013	Progreso	7	(0)
2013–2014	Cerro	26	(0)
2014	Gostaresh Foolad	11	(0)
2015	Deportivo Pasto	8	(0)
2015	Atenas	7	(0)
2016	Progreso	13	(0)
2016–2019	Rampla Juniors	108	(0)
2020–2021	Ñublense	18	(0)
2021–2024	Racing Montevideo	60	(0)
2025–	Huachipato	0	(0)
- * Club domestic league appearances and goals as of 6 December 2024

Rodrigo Odriozola López (born 31 August 1988) is a Uruguayan professional footballer who plays for Chilean club Huachipato as a goalkeeper.

== Career ==
Odriozola was born in Durazno. He started his senior career with Montevideo Wanderers. He signed with Iranian club Gostaresh Foolad in August 2014. He was released by the club in December 2014. In 2015, signed with Deportivo Pasto.

Odriozola returned to Chile for the 2025 season by signing with Huachipato after his stint with Ñublense in 2020–21.

== Honours ==
Ñublense

- Primera B de Chile: 2020

Racing de Montevideo

- Torneo Competencia: 2022
- Uruguayan Segunda División: 2022

Huachipato

- Copa Chile: 2025
