= Ayrton Cougo =

Uruguayan footballer (born 1996)

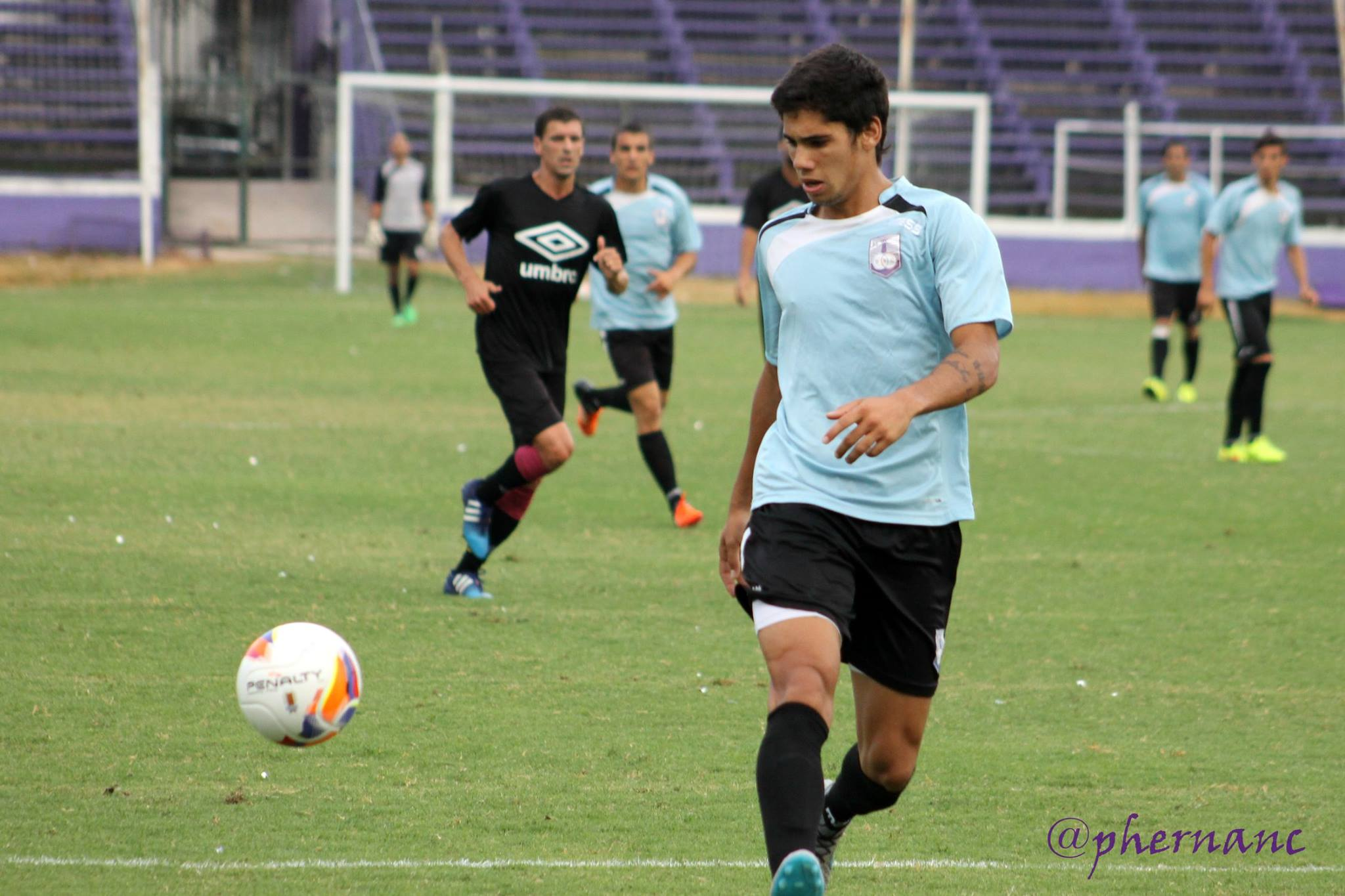

Personal information
- Full name: Carlos Ayrton Cougo Rivero
- Date of birth: 15 June 1996 (age 30)
- Place of birth: Melo, Uruguay
- Height: 1.80 m (5 ft 11 in)
- Position: Left back

Team information
- Current team: Boston River
- Number: 15

Youth career
- San Salvador
- Boca Juniors de Melo
- 2011–2016: Defensor Sporting

Senior career*
Years	Team	Apps	(Gls)
2016–2018	Defensor Sporting	56	(11)
2019–2022	Libertad	25	(1)
2020	→ Nacional (loan)	18	(1)
2022	→ Avaí (loan)	5	(0)
2022–2023	Liverpool Montevideo	13	(1)
2023	→ Sarmiento (loan)	6	(0)
2023–	Boston River	8	(0)

International career
2012–2013	Uruguay U17	3	(0)
- * Club domestic league appearances and goals as of 4 November 2023

Carlos Ayrton Cougo Rivero (born 15 June 1996) is a Uruguayan footballer who plays as left back for Boston River.

== Club career ==
Cougo was born in Melo, and joined Defensor Sporting's youth setup at the age of 15. He made his first team debut on 14 February 2016, starting in a 1–3 home loss against Racing Montevideo.

Cougo subsequently became a regular starter, and signed for Paraguayan club Libertad on 2 January 2019, after the club bought 50% of his economic rights for a US$ 1.5 million fee. On 31 December, however, he returned to his home country after agreeing to a one-year loan deal with Nacional.

Back to Libertad for the 2021 season, Cougo again failed to establish himself as a starter, and was loaned to Campeonato Brasileiro Série A side Avaí on 21 January 2022.

== Career statistics ==
As of 22 January 2022

Club	Season	League			Cup		Continental		Other		Total	
Club	Season	Division	Apps	Goals	Apps	Goals	Apps	Goals	Apps	Goals	Apps	Goals
Defensor Sporting	2015–16	Uruguayan Primera División	1	0	—		—		—		1	0
Defensor Sporting	2016	Uruguayan Primera División	7	1	—		—		—		7	1
Defensor Sporting	2017	Uruguayan Primera División	27	6	—		1 (Note: Appearance(s) in Copa Sudamericana)	0	—		28	6
Defensor Sporting	2018	Uruguayan Primera División	21	4	—		6 (Note: Five appearances in Copa Libertadores, one appearance in Copa Sudamericana)	0	—		27	4
Defensor Sporting	Total		56	11	—		7	0	—		63	11
Libertad	2019	Paraguayan Primera División	14	0	—		6 (Note: Appearance(s) in Copa Libertadores)	2	—		20	2
Libertad	2021	Paraguayan Primera División	11	1	—		2 (Note: One appearance in Copa Libertadores, one appearance in Copa Sudamericana)	0	—		13	1
Libertad	Total		25	1	—		8	2	—		33	3
Nacional (loan)	2020	Uruguayan Primera División	18	1	—		7	1	1 (Note: Appearance(s) in Supercopa Uruguaya)	0	26	2
Avaí (loan)	2022	Série A	0	0	0	0	0	0	0	0	0	0
Career total			99	13	0	0	22	3	1	0	122	14
