= Gonzalo González (footballer, born 1993) =

Uruguayan footballer (born 1993)

Personal information
- Full name: Gonzalo Federico González Pereyra
- Date of birth: 7 October 1993 (age 33)
- Place of birth: Rocha, Uruguay
- Height: 1.80 m (5 ft 11 in)
- Position: Midfielder

Team information
- Current team: Delfín
- Number: 33

Youth career
- –2013: Danubio

Senior career*
| Years | Team | Apps | (Gls) |
| 2013–2018 | Danubio | 56 | (1) |
| 2018 | Arsenal Sarandí | 12 | (0) |
| 2018 | Apollon Smyrnis | 5 | (0) |
| 2019 | Juventud | 30 | (2) |
| 2020–2021 | Albirex Niigata | 19 | (0) |
| 2022 | Delfín | 28 | (0) |
| 2023 | Cienciano | 18 | (0) |
- * Club domestic league appearances and goals as of 22 June 2025

Gonzalo Federico González Pereyra (born 7 October 1993) is an Uruguayan professional footballer who plays as a midfielder.

== Career ==
González began his career in 2013 with Danubio of the Uruguayan Primera División, making his professional debut on 8 December in a 2–0 win over El Tanque Sisley. This late-season fixture ended up being his only appearance of the 2013–14 campaign, although Danubio finished as league champion. Over the following four seasons, he made 55 more appearances. His lone goal with the club came on the final match-day of the 2017 season, during a 1–0 win against Boston River on 3 December. Incidentally, this was his final appearance with the club, yet his game-winning goal ensured Danubio's place in the 2018 Copa Sudamericana.

In January 2018, González joined Argentine Primera División side Arsenal Sarandí. His first appearance for Arsenal Sarandí came on 4 February versus Gimnasia La Plata, playing the full 90 minutes of a 0–0 draw.

Five months later, he made the move to Apollon Smyrnis, signing a one-year deal with the Athens-based club.

González signed with Ecuadorian Serie A side Delfín in January 2022.

In January 2023, González signed with Peruvian Primera División side Cienciano.

== Honours ==
=== Club ===
Danubio

- Uruguayan Primera División: 2013–14

== Career statistics ==
As of 1 March 2018.

Club statistics
| Club | Season | League | | | Cup | | League Cup | | Continental (Note: Includes the Copa Libertadores and Copa Sudamericana) | | Other | | Total | |
| Club | Season | Division | Apps | Goals | Apps | Goals | Apps | Goals | Apps | Goals | Apps | Goals | Apps | Goals |
|---|---|---|---|---|---|---|---|---|---|---|---|---|---|---|
| Danubio | 2013–14 | Uruguayan Primera División | 1 | 0 | — | | — | | 0 | 0 | 0 | 0 | 1 | 0 |
| Danubio | 2014–15 | Uruguayan Primera División | 8 | 0 | — | | — | | 1 (Note: One appearance in 2014 Copa Libertadores) | 0 | 0 | 0 | 9 | 0 |
| Danubio | 2015–16 | Uruguayan Primera División | 9 | 0 | — | | — | | — | | 0 | 0 | 9 | 0 |
| Danubio | 2016 | Uruguayan Primera División | 11 | 0 | — | | — | | 0 | 0 | 0 | 0 | 11 | 0 |
| Danubio | 2017 | Uruguayan Primera División | 27 | 1 | — | | — | | 1 (Note: One appearance in 2017 Copa Libertadores) | 0 | 0 | 0 | 28 | 1 |
| Danubio | Total | | 56 | 1 | — | | — | | 2 | 0 | 0 | 0 | 58 | 1 |
| Arsenal Sarandí | 2017–18 | Argentine Primera División | 12 | 0 | 1 | 0 | — | | — | | 0 | 0 | 7 | 0 |
| Arsenal Sarandí | Total | | 12 | 0 | 1 | 0 | — | | 0 | 0 | 0 | 0 | 7 | 0 |
| Career total | | | 68 | 1 | 1 | 0 | — | | 0 | 0 | 0 | 0 | 65 | 1 |
