= Rodrigo Izquierdo =

Uruguayan footballer (born 1992)

Personal information
- Full name: Rodrigo Andrés Izquierdo Díaz
- Date of birth: 19 November 1992 (age 33)
- Place of birth: San Ramón, Uruguay
- Height: 1.74 m (5 ft 8 1/2 in)
- Position: Right back

Team information
- Current team: Huracán Buceo

Youth career
- –2014: Cerro

Senior career*
Years	Team	Apps	(Gls)
2014–2017	Cerro	30	(0)
2017–2019	Zacatepec	31	(0)
2019–2020	Cerro	56	(0)
2021–2022	Albion	54	(1)
2023–2024	Sud América	49	(2)
2024–2025	Progreso	8	(0)
2025–2026	Tembetary	7	(0)
2026–	Huracán Buceo	0	(0)
- * Club domestic league appearances and goals as of 15:12, 20 March 2026 (UTC)

Rodrigo Andrés Izquierdo Díaz (born 19 November 1992) is a Uruguayan footballer who plays as a right back for Huracán Buceo.

== Career statistics ==
=== Club ===
As of 18 July 2018.

Club	Season	League			Cup		Continental		Other		Total	
Club	Season	Division	Apps	Goals	Apps	Goals	Apps	Goals	Apps	Goals	Apps	Goals
C.A. Cerro	2014–15	Uruguayan Primera División	3	0	0	0	–		0	0	3	0
C.A. Cerro	2015–16	Uruguayan Primera División	4	0	0	0	–		0	0	4	0
C.A. Cerro	2016	Uruguayan Primera División	1	0	0	0	–		0	0	1	0
C.A. Cerro	2017	Uruguayan Primera División	22	0	0	0	2 (Note: Appearances in the Copa Libertadores)	0	0	0	24	0
C.A. Cerro	Total		30	0	0	0	2	0	0	0	32	0
Zacatepec	2017–18	Ascenso MX	22	0	2 (Note: Appearances in the Copa MX)	0	–		0	0	24	0
Zacatepec	2018–19	Ascenso MX	0	0	0	0	–		0	0	0	0
Career total			52	0	2	0	2	0	0	0	56	0
