= Christian Almeida =

Uruguayan footballer (born 1989)

Personal information
- Full name: Christian Andrés Almeida Rodríguez
- Date of birth: 25 December 1989 (age 36)
- Place of birth: Montevideo, Uruguay
- Height: 1.70 m (5 ft 7 in)
- Positions: Left-back; centre-back

Team information
- Current team: River Plate
- Number: 13

Youth career
- Uruguay Montevideo
- Libertad Washington
- Liverpool

Senior career*
| Years | Team | Apps | (Gls) |
| 2011–2017 | Liverpool | 141 | (5) |
| 2018–2019 | Defensa y Justicia | 17 | (1) |
| 2019 | Belgrano | 16 | (0) |
| 2020 | Godoy Cruz | 5 | (0) |
| 2020 | Liverpool | 22 | (3) |
| 2021–2023 | Nacional | 27 | (3) |
| 2024– | River Plate | 22 | (1) |
- * Club domestic league appearances and goals as of 15 September 2024

Christian Andrés Almeida Rodríguez (born 25 December 1989) is a Uruguayan professional footballer who plays as a left-back for River Plate.

== Career ==
Liverpool were Almeida's first senior team, beginning in his homeland of Uruguay and subsequently remaining for six years with Liverpool. His debut for the club arrived on 13 August 2011 in a draw away to Racing Club (M), which was one of four appearances in the 2011–12 Uruguayan Primera División. Four years and fifty-four appearances later, in March 2015, Almeida scored his first goal in a 2–5 victory over Cerrito; which came in the Uruguayan Segunda División following relegation in 2013–14 - Liverpool won instant promotion back in 2014–15 as champions. He made his Copa Sudamericana bow in 2017 against Fluminense.

In January 2018, Argentine Primera División side Defensa y Justicia signed Almeida. Two goals, against Racing Club (A) and Mitre (cup), in sixteen matches followed in his first season. Almeida departed in January 2019 to join Belgrano. He remained for twelve months as Belgrano suffered relegation to Primera B Nacional. Almeida left in January 2020, as he agreed terms with Godoy Cruz.

In October 2020, Almeida returned to his former club Liverpool. He left the club again at the end of the year. On 9 April 2021, Almeida signed with Nacional.

== Career statistics ==
As of 6 July 2020.

Club statistics
| Club | Season | League | | | Cup | | League Cup | | Continental | | Other | | Total | |
| Club | Season | Division | Apps | Goals | Apps | Goals | Apps | Goals | Apps | Goals | Apps | Goals | Apps | Goals |
|---|---|---|---|---|---|---|---|---|---|---|---|---|---|---|
| Liverpool | 2011–12 | Uruguayan Primera División | 4 | 0 | — | | — | | 0 | 0 | 4 | 0 | | |
| Liverpool | 2012–13 | Uruguayan Primera División | 18 | 0 | — | | — | | 0 | 0 | 0 | 0 | 18 | 0 |
| Liverpool | 2013–14 | Uruguayan Primera División | 24 | 0 | — | | — | | — | | 0 | 0 | 24 | 0 |
| Liverpool | 2014–15 | Segunda División | 20 | 1 | — | | — | | — | | 0 | 0 | 20 | 1 |
| Liverpool | 2015–16 | Uruguayan Primera División | 27 | 2 | — | | — | | — | | 0 | 0 | 27 | 2 |
| Liverpool | 2016 | Uruguayan Primera División | 15 | 1 | — | | — | | — | | 0 | 0 | 15 | 1 |
| Liverpool | 2017 | Uruguayan Primera División | 33 | 1 | — | | — | | 2 (Note: Appearance(s) in the Copa Sudamericana) | 0 | 0 | 0 | 35 | 1 |
| Liverpool | Total | | 141 | 5 | — | | — | | 2 | 0 | 0 | 0 | 143 | 5 |
| Defensa y Justicia | 2017–18 | Argentine Primera División | 13 | 1 | 1 | 1 | — | | 2 | 0 | 0 | 0 | 16 | 2 |
| Defensa y Justicia | 2018–19 | Argentine Primera División | 4 | 0 | 1 | 0 | — | | 5 | 1 | 0 | 0 | 10 | 1 |
| Defensa y Justicia | Total | | 17 | 1 | 2 | 1 | — | | 7 | 1 | 0 | 0 | 26 | 3 |
| Belgrano | 2018–19 | Argentine Primera División | 5 | 0 | 0 | 0 | 2 | 0 | — | | 0 | 0 | 7 | 0 |
| Belgrano | 2019–20 | Primera B Nacional | 11 | 0 | 1 | 0 | — | | — | | 0 | 0 | 12 | 0 |
| Belgrano | Total | | 16 | 0 | 1 | 0 | 2 | 0 | — | | 0 | 0 | 19 | 0 |
| Godoy Cruz | 2019–20 | Argentine Primera División | 5 | 0 | 0 | 0 | 1 | 0 | 0 | 0 | 0 | 0 | 6 | 0 |
| Career total | | | 179 | 6 | 3 | 1 | 3 | 0 | 9 | 1 | 0 | 0 | 194 | 8 |

== Honours ==
Liverpool

- Segunda División: 2014–15
