= Santiago Bellini =

Uruguayan footballer (born 1996)

Personal information
- Full name: Santiago Bellini Noya
- Date of birth: 19 September 1996 (age 30)
- Place of birth: Las Piedras, Uruguay
- Height: 1.85 m (6 ft 1 in)
- Position: Forward

Team information
- Current team: Central Español

Youth career
- –2004: Los Pingüinos de Las Piedras
- 2005–2014: Montevideo Wanderers

Senior career*
Years	Team	Apps	(Gls)
2015–2020	Montevideo Wanderers	69	(11)
2019	→ Pescara (loan)	9	(0)
2019	→ Sporting Gijón B (loan)	8	(1)
2021–	Central Español	15	(2)
- * Club domestic league appearances and goals as of 18:27, 13 July 2021 (UTC)

Santiago Bellini Noya (born 19 September 1996) is a Uruguayan professional footballer who plays as a forward for Central Español.

== Club career ==
He made his Uruguayan Primera División debut for Montevideo Wanderers on 15 March 2015 in a game against Atenas, as a half-time substitute for Gastón Rodríguez Maeso.

On 31 January 2019, he joined Italian Serie B club Pescara on loan.

On 2 September 2019, he moved to the Spanish club Sporting de Gijón B on loan. However, Sporting announced on 30 January 2020, that the deal had been terminated by mutual consent.
