= Williams Martínez =

Uruguayan footballer (1982–2021)

Personal information
- Full name: Williams Guillermo Martínez Fracchia
- Date of birth: 18 December 1982
- Place of birth: Montevideo, Uruguay
- Date of death: 17 July 2021 (aged 38)
- Height: 1.85 m (6 ft 1 in)
- Position: Centre-back

Youth career
- Defensor Sporting

Senior career*
Years	Team	Apps	(Gls)
2001–2008	Defensor Sporting	93	(8)
2003	→ Ferro Carril (loan)		
2006	→ West Brom (loan)	2	(1)
2008–2009	Valenciennes	7	(0)
2008–2009	→ Reims (loan)	17	(0)
2009–2011	Defensor Sporting	23	(0)
2010–2011	→ Chacarita Juniors (loan)	26	(0)
2011–2012	Huachipato	13	(0)
2012–2013	Palestino	26	(0)
2013–2014	Cerro Porteño	0	(0)
2014–2015	River Plate Montevideo	25	(1)
2015–2016	Cerro	30	(2)
2016	Deportivo Táchira	15	(0)
2016	Rampla Juniors	13	(0)
2017–2018	River Plate Montevideo	59	(4)
2019	Ceuta	6	(1)
2020–2021	Rampla Juniors	20	(0)
2021	Villa Teresa	3	(0)

International career
2003	Uruguay	1	(0)
- * Club domestic league appearances and goals

Williams Martínez Fracchia (18 December 1982 – 17 July 2021) was a Uruguayan professional footballer who played as a centre-back.

He played for Defensor Sporting, River Plate Montevideo, Cerro and Rampla Juniors in the Uruguayan Primera División, as well as playing in the top divisions of football in Chile, Paraguay and Venezuela and the second division in Argentina. Abroad, he had brief spells in the English Premier League with West Bromwich Albion and French Ligue 1 with Valenciennes.

Martínez played one game for Uruguay in 2003. He died by suicide in 2021 aged 38, while a player of Villa Teresa.

== Club career ==
=== Defensor and West Browmwich ===
Born in Montevideo and the holder of an Italian passport, Martínez began his professional career at Defensor Sporting, where he became captain. On 31 January 2006, he moved to Premier League team West Bromwich Albion on loan for the rest of the season with the option to make it permanent. Manager Bryan Robson, who signed him on the recommendation of former Uruguay international striker Daniel Fonseca, hoped that Martínez would be as good as fellow West Brom centre-back Curtis Davies.

Martínez made his West Brom debut on 11 February 2006 in a 6–1 loss at Fulham, coming on at half time as a substitute for Thomas Gaardsøe; he received a yellow card in the game, and afterwards, manager Robson called the entire defence "shocking". His only other game was a start away at Everton in which he scored to put his team 2–0 up, but also conceded a penalty with a late foul on Mikel Arteta, from which Duncan Ferguson scored the equaliser in a 2–2 draw.

=== Valenciennes ===
In January 2008, Martínez returned to Europe on a 2 1/2-year deal at Valenciennes FC of the French Ligue 1, for a fee of €1.2 million. On his debut on 12 January, the team won 2–0 at home to AS Saint-Étienne. In his final game on 23 February, he and Le Mans FC player Anthony Le Tallec were sent off for fighting in a brawl that started when Valenciennes' Steve Savidan scored while Le Mans' Romaric was lying injured; Le Mans won 2–1 away.

For the 2008–09 season, Martínez was loaned to Stade de Reims in Ligue 2.

=== Return to South America ===
In August 2009, Martínez returned to Defensor after cancelling his Valenciennes contract a year early, as he did not feature in the plans of manager Philippe Montanier. He was loaned a year later to Chacarita Juniors in the Argentine second-tier Primera Nacional. After two years in the Chilean Primera División with Huachipato FC and Club Deportivo Palestino, he signed in January 2013 for Cerro Porteño in the Paraguayan Primera División. With the club, he made his debut in continental tournaments in the Copa Libertadores; on 14 February he scored a consolation in the opening 2–1 loss at Colombia's Deportes Tolima, and on 7 March he was sent off in a home loss by the same score to Independiente Santa Fe from the same country.

After playing in the Uruguayan Primera División for Club Atlético River Plate (Montevideo) and C.A. Cerro, Martínez moved in January 2016 to Deportivo Táchira F.C. in the Venezuelan Primera División. Having not agreed on a renewal, he was released in June.

Martínez returned to his country's top flight at Rampla Juniors and River Plate again. In February 2019, he made a return to European football leagues for the first time in nearly a decade, as the 36-year-old signed for AD Ceuta FC in the Spanish fourth-tier Tercera División. He went back to Rampla, now in the Uruguayan Segunda División, and ended his career with Villa Teresa in the same league.

== International career ==
Martínez played one game for Uruguay national team on 4 February 2003 at the Lunar New Year Cup. Accompanying Diego Lugano in central defence, the team drew 1–1 in the final against Iran in Hong Kong before winning 4–2 in a penalty shootout.

== Death ==
Martínez died on 17 July 2021 of suicide, aged 38, as a result of a depression caused by COVID-19-related inactivity. The Uruguayan Football Association suspended matches all remaining fixtures of the weekend upon learning of his death.
