= Deivis Barone =

Uruguayan footballer (born 1979)

Personal information
- Full name: Deivis Barone Farías
- Date of birth: 28 August 1979 (age 47)
- Place of birth: Canelones, Uruguay
- Height: 1.84 m (6 ft 0 in)
- Position: Centre back

Team information
- Current team: Canadian Keguay

Senior career*
Years	Team	Apps	(Gls)
1998–2003	River Plate Montevideo	110	(9)
2004–2005	Instituto de Córdoba	25	(3)
2005	Junior Barranquilla	18	(1)
2006–2007	Libertad	14	(0)
2007	Nacional Montevideo	24	(4)
2008	Colón		
2008–2009	Unión Atlético Maracaibo	14	(3)
2009	Caracas FC	12	(2)
2009–2013	Atlético Tucumán	137	(11)
2013–2015	San Martín San Juan	25	(3)
2015–2016	Guillermo Brown	34	(0)
2016–2017	Rentistas	36	(4)
2017–2018	River Plate Montevideo	20	(0)
2019	Tacuarembó	17	(1)
2020	Rivera Hinterland		
2020–	Canadian Keguay		
- * Club domestic league appearances and goals as of 23:33, 26 September 2020 (UTC)

Deivis Barone Farías (born 28 August 1979 in Canelones) is a Uruguayan footballer who currently plays for Canadian Keguay.

== Career ==
Barone began his professional playing career with River Plate Montevideo, after 5 years with the club he moved to Argentina where he played with Instituto de Córdoba.

Barone then played in Colombia with Junior Barranquilla and Paraguay with Libertad before returning to Uruguay to play for Nacional Montevideo.

In 2008 Barone returned to Argentina when he joined Colón but soon left to play in Venezuela where he played for Unión Atlético Maracaibo and then Caracas FC. In 2009 Barone returned to Argentina again when he signed for newly promoted Atlético Tucumán.

On 11 June 2020, 40-year old Barone announced his retirement. However, he returned to the pitch one month later, signing with Rivera Hinterland. In September 2020, Barone posted pictures playing for Canadian Keguay.

== Personal life ==
Barone's daughter, Fátima Barone, is a member of the Uruguay women's national football team and has represented the country at the 2018 South American U-20 Women's Championship.
