= Agustín Gutiérrez =

Uruguayan footballer (born 1992)

Personal information
- Full name: Miguel Agustín Gutiérrez de León
- Date of birth: 11 February 1992 (age 34)
- Place of birth: Montevideo, Uruguay
- Height: 1.73 m (5 ft 8 in)
- Position: Midfielder

Youth career
- –2011: Peñarol

Senior career*
Years	Team	Apps	(Gls)
2011	Caxias	1	(0)
2012	Cerâmica		
2012–2015	Racing	54	(12)
2016	Talleres	11	(0)
2016	→ Mineros (loan)	6	(0)
2017	River Plate	18	(2)
2017	Cerro	13	(1)
2018	Boston River	5	(1)
2018	O'Higgins	12	(1)
2019	Cuiabá	18	(2)
2020	Rampla Juniors	140	(1)
2022	La Luz	17	(0)
2023	Alfonso Ugarte	21	(2)
- * Club domestic league appearances and goals

Miguel Agustín Gutiérrez de León (born February 11, 1992) is a professional Uruguayan footballer.
