= Maximiliano Arias =

Uruguayan footballer (born 1988)

Personal information
- Full name: Álvaro Maximiliano Arias Invernizzi
- Date of birth: 3 October 1988 (age 38)
- Place of birth: Montevideo, Uruguay
- Height: 1.85 m (6 ft 1 in)
- Position: Defender

Senior career*
Years	Team	Apps	(Gls)
2005–2009	Peñarol	54	(2)
2009	Fénix	11	(1)
2010	Astra Giurgiu	2	(0)
2010–2011	Rampla Juniors	12	(2)
2011–2012	Querétaro	1	(0)
2012	→ Liverpool Montevideo (loan)	8	(1)
2013	Brescia	5	(0)
2014	Fénix	1	(0)
2014	Rampla Juniors	7	(0)
2015	Sud América	1	(0)
2015	→ El Tanque Sisley (loan)	1	(0)
2016	Sud América	12	(1)
2016	Liverpool Montevideo	4	(0)
2017	River Plate Montevideo	2	(0)
2018	Sud América	4	(0)
- * Club domestic league appearances and goals

Álvaro Maximiliano Arias Invernizzi (born 3 October 1988) is a Uruguayan retired footballer. Arias has partial Italian descent on his mother's side.

== Club career ==
Arias made his debut in the first team of Peñarol in 2005, remaining at the club in Montevideo until 2009, when he moved to Fénix, always playing in the top division.

In February 2010 he was signed by Romanian side Astra Giurgiu.

In mid-2010, after remaining six months in Europe, Arias came back to Uruguay now signing with Rampla Juniors.

On 25 June 2011, it was announced that he was sold to Querétaro F.C. of Mexico.

On 31 January 2013, Arias signed a new contract with Serie B side Brescia Calcio.

== International career ==
He was an unused member at 2005 FIFA U-17 World Championship.
