= Nicolás Machado =

Uruguayan footballer (born 1997)

Personal information
- Full name: Nicolás Teodoro Machado Mira
- Date of birth: 3 January 1997 (age 29)
- Place of birth: Paysandú, Uruguay
- Height: 1.86 m (6 ft 1 in)
- Position: Centre forward

Youth career
- 2011–2016: River Plate

Senior career*
Years	Team	Apps	(Gls)
2016–2018	River Plate	9	(0)
2017	→ Villa Teresa (loan)	15	(2)
2018	→ Llaneros (loan)	8	(1)
2019	Zamudio		
2020–2021	Fénix	28	(2)
2022	Miramar Misiones	21	(0)
- * Club domestic league appearances and goals as of 8 October 2022

Nicolás Teodoro Machado Mira (born 3 January 1997) is a Uruguayan professional footballer who plays as a centre forward.

== Club career ==
Machado started his career playing with River Plate. He made his professional debut during the 2015/16 season.

In the summer 2019, Machado was one out of several Uruguayan players who joined Spanish club Zamudio SD. In 2020, he returned to Uruguay and joined Centro Atlético Fénix.
