= Yefferson Moreira =

Uruguayan footballer (born 1991)

Personal information
- Full name: Yefferson Moreira Scaraffoni
- Date of birth: March 7, 1991 (age 35)
- Place of birth: Bella Unión, Uruguay
- Height: 1.74 m (5 ft 8 1/2 in)
- Position: Left back

Team information
- Current team: Bella Vista

Youth career
- Peñarol

Senior career*
Years	Team	Apps	(Gls)
2009–2011	Peñarol	8	(0)
2012	→ Cerro (loan)	7	(0)
2012–2017	El Tanque Sisley	102	(2)
2017	River Plate	6	(0)
2017	Rentistas	14	(0)
2018	Atlético Pantoja		
2019	Villa Teresa	11	(0)
2019–	Bella Vista	7	(0)
- * Club domestic league appearances and goals

Yefferson Moreira Scaraffoni (born March 7, 1991) is a Uruguayan footballer who plays for C.A. Bella Vista.

== Career ==
Moreira began his career in 2009 with Peñarol.
