= Joaquín Noy =

Uruguayan footballer (born 1992)

Personal information
- Full name: Joaquín Noy González
- Date of birth: December 3, 1992 (age 33)
- Place of birth: Colonia del Sacramento, Uruguay
- Height: 1.86 m (6 ft 1 in)
- Position: Defensive midfielder

Team information
- Current team: La Luz
- Number: 19

Senior career*
Years	Team	Apps	(Gls)
2011–2012	Montevideo Wanderers B		
2012–2013	Plaza Colonia		
2013	Rampla Juniors		
2013–2014	Deportivo Maldonado	17	(1)
2015	Deportivo Azogues	0	(0)
2015–2016	Miramar Misiones	22	(0)
2016	Once Caldas	10	(0)
2017	River Plate	10	(0)
2018–2020	Montevideo Wanderers	21	(1)
2019	→ FC Juárez (loan)	4	(0)
2020	→ Villa Española (loan)	7	(0)
2021–2023	Villa Teresa	9	(0)
2023–2024	Club Oriental	15	(0)
2024–	La Luz	9	(0)
- * Club domestic league appearances and goals

Joaquín Noy González (born December 3, 1992) is a Uruguayan footballer who plays for La Luz.

== Career ==
Noy began his career in 2013 with Deportivo Maldonado.
