= Santiago Fosgt =

Argentine footballer

Personal information
- Full name: Santiago Augusto Fosgt Brehm
- Date of birth: 17 March 1986 (age 40)
- Place of birth: Buenos Aires, Argentina
- Position: Defender

Senior career*
Years	Team	Apps	(Gls)
2004–2005	Patronato de Paraná	6	(0)
2005–2008	Juventud Las Piedras	22	(1)
2008–2009	Danubio	3	(0)
2009–2011	Fénix	42	(8)
2011–2013	Colón de Santa Fe	3	(0)
2013–2014	Patronato de Paraná	5	(0)
2014–2015	El Tanque Sisley	23	(0)
2015–2016	Atlético Venezuela	23	(0)
2017	El Tanque Sisley	33	(2)
2018	Fénix	25	(1)
2019	UTC Cajamarca	16	(0)
- * Club domestic league appearances and goals

Santiago Fosgt (born 27 March 1986) is an Argentine former footballer.
