= Fabricio Fernández =

Uruguayan footballer (born 1993)

Personal information
- Full name: Fabricio Fernández Pertusso
- Date of birth: 9 April 1993 (age 33)
- Place of birth: Rocha, Uruguay
- Height: 1.72 m (5 ft 8 in)
- Position: Midfielder

Team information
- Current team: Progreso
- Number: 7

Youth career
- Nacional

Senior career*
Years	Team	Apps	(Gls)
2013	Rocha	7	(1)
2015–2016	Dender EH	48	(9)
2016–2017	River Plate	31	(0)
2018	Miramar Misiones	26	(5)
2019	Mt Druitt Town	19	(11)
2020–2021	Progreso	36	(8)
2021–2022	Macará	13	(1)
2022–2023	Atenas	26	(4)
2023	Rentistas	19	(6)
2023–2024	Al Orooba		
2024	Dibba		
2025–2026	Al Orooba		
2026–	Progreso	0	(0)
- * Club domestic league appearances and goals as of 14:58, 15 December 2021 (UTC)

Fabricio Fernández Pertusso (born 9 April 1993) is a Uruguayan professional footballer who plays for Progreso as a midfielder.

== Career ==
Fernández began his career in 2013 with Rocha.

On 28 January 2019, Australian club Mt Druitt Town Rangers FC announced on their official Facebook account, that they had signed Fernández. He returned to Uruguay in January 2020, signing with C.A. Progreso.

== Personal life ==
Fernández is the older brother of fellow footballer Joaquín Fernández.
