= Central Español =

Association football club in Uruguay

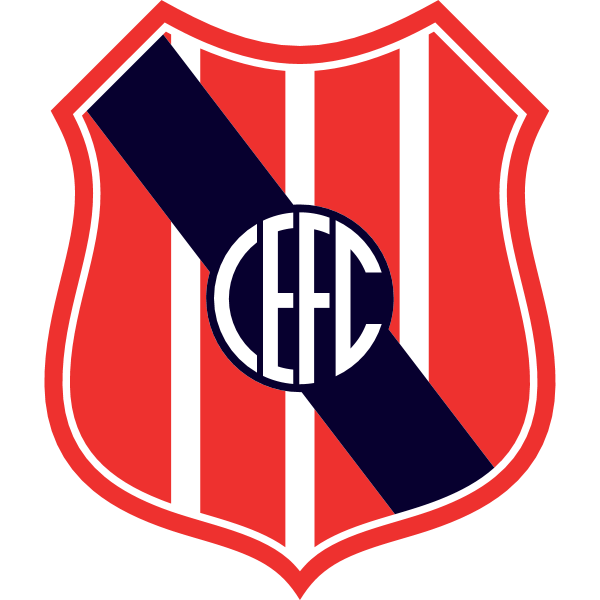
- Full name: Central Español Fútbol Club
- Nicknames: Palermitanos; Centralófilos; La roja del Palermo
- Founded: January 5, 1905; 121 years ago
- Ground: Parque Palermo
- Capacity: 6,500
- Chairman: Guillermo Rodriguez Misa
- Coach: Pablo de Ambrosio
- League: Liga AUF Uruguaya
- 2025: Segunda División, 2nd of 14 (promoted)
- Website: http://www.central.com.uy
Home colours	Away colours

Central Español Fútbol Club, usually known simply as Central Español is a Uruguayan football club based in Montevideo.

== History ==
=== The F.U.F era ===
Together with Peñarol, Central founded FUF (Uruguayan football federation) in 1923 after being expelled from AUF. The FUF even made a parallel Uruguay national team (dissident to AUF) that played several international games based on Peñarol and Central squads. After 3 years of existence the new federation was dissolved and both teams returned to AUF.

=== Merging ===
Central append "Español" to its name after an agreement signed with a Spanish group in 1971. Central itself was born from a merge between "Solís Bochas" and "Soriano Polideportivo".

=== Champions ===
In 1984 Central Español won their only Uruguayan championship to date. The team was managed by Líber Arispe during campaign.

== Honours ==
=== National ===
- Primera División
  - Winners (1): 1984
- Torneo Competencia
  - Winners (1): 1944
- Segunda División Uruguay
  - Winners (3): 1961, 1983, 2011–12
- Tercera División Uruguay
  - Winners (1): 1928 (as Central FC)

== Performance in CONMEBOL competitions ==
- Copa Sudamericana: 1 appearance

2006: First Round

== Current squad ==
As of 22 March, 2026

Note: Flags indicate national team as defined under FIFA eligibility rules; some limited exceptions apply. Players may hold more than one non-FIFA nationality.

No.	Pos.	Nation	Player
1	GK	URU	Emiliano Márquez
2	DF	URU	Ignacio Rodríguez
3	DF	URU	Juan Ignacio Dupont
4	MF	URU	Marcos Montiel
5	MF	URU	Juber Pereira
6	DF	URU	Mateo Urrutia
7	MF	URU	Franco Muñoz
8	MF	URU	Fernando Camarda
9	FW	URU	Raúl Tarragona
10	FW	URU	Rodrigo Muniz
11	FW	ARG	Mariano Aguilera
13	DF	URU	Logan Ponce
14	DF	URU	Alejandro Villoldo
15	DF	URU	Mateo Cantera
16	MF	URU	Isaac Méndez
17	DF	URU	Luciano Fernández

No.	Pos.	Nation	Player
18	MF	URU	Facundo Yocco
19	FW	URU	Matías Kusmanis
20	FW	URU	Diego Vera
21	MF	URU	Lucas Wasilewsky
22	DF	URU	Ernesto Aramburú
23	FW	URU	Ignacio Gonella
24	MF	URU	Guillermo Gandolfo
26	DF	BRA	César Nunes
27	FW	URU	Facundo Sosa
28	FW	URU	Nicolás Campos
29	MF	URU	Lucas Pino
30	MF	URU	Máximo Alonso
39	GK	BRA	Rodolfo
—	MF	ARG	Sebastián Sánchez
—	DF	COL	Sander Navarro

== Managers ==
- (Uruguay) Julio Antúnez (July 2005–Dec 06)
- (Uruguay) Gustavo Díaz (Jan 2008–March 8)
- (Uruguay) Julio Antúnez (March 2008–June 8)
- (Uruguay) Mario Saralegui (Dec 2009–March 10)
- (Uruguay) Daniel Sánchez (March 2010–June 11)
- (Uruguay) Darlyn Gayol (July 2011–Feb 13)
- (Uruguay) Julio Acuña (Feb 2013–April 13)
- (Argentina) Óscar Pacheco (April 2013–)
- Maxi Viera (June 2022)
