= Franco Muñoz =

Uruguayan footballer (born 1999)

Personal information
- Full name: Franco Martín Muñoz Rodríguez
- Date of birth: 6 February 1999 (age 27)
- Place of birth: Santa Lucía, Uruguay
- Height: 1.79 m (5 ft 10 in)
- Position: Midfielder

Team information
- Current team: Betim
- Number: 8

Senior career*
Years	Team	Apps	(Gls)
2017–2023	Juventud	108	(1)
2024–	Betim		
- * Club domestic league appearances and goals as of 3 December 2023

Franco Martín Muñoz Rodríguez (born 6 February 1999) is a Uruguayan footballer who plays as a midfielder for Brazilian club Betim.

== Career ==
=== Juventud ===
Muñoz signed his first professional contract with the club in August 2017. He made his competitive debut for the club later on that year, coming on as a late substitute for Alejandro Reyes in a 3-2 defeat to Cerro.

== Career statistics ==
=== Club ===
As of match played 4 January, 2021

Appearances and goals by club, season and competition
Club	Season	League			Cup		Other (Note: Includes Uruguayan Segunda División Promotion Play-Offs)		Total	
Club	Season	Division	Apps	Goals	Apps	Goals	Apps	Goals	Apps	Goals
Juventud	2017	Uruguayan Primera División	5	0	—	—	—	—	5	0
Juventud	2018	Uruguayan Segunda División	4	0	—	—	—	—	4	0
Juventud	2019	Uruguayan Primera División	11	0	—	—	—	—	11	0
Juventud	2020	Uruguayan Segunda División	20	0	—	—	2	0	22	0
Career total			40	0	—	—	2	0	42	0
