= Liber Quiñones =

Uruguayan footballer (born 1985)

Personal information
- Full name: Liber Daniel Quiñones Prieto
- Date of birth: 11 February 1985 (age 41)
- Place of birth: Montevideo, Uruguay
- Height: 1.79 m (5 ft 10 in)
- Position: Forward

Youth career
- Defensor Sporting

Senior career*
Years	Team	Apps	(Gls)
2005–2013	Racing Montevideo	157	(56)
2010	→ Cobreloa (loan)	8	(0)
2011	→ Gimnasia La Plata (loan)	9	(1)
2013	Danubio	15	(8)
2014–2016	Veracruz	22	(2)
2015	→ Universitario (loan)	16	(2)
2015–2016	→ Racing Montevideo (loan)	27	(8)
2016–2017	Racing Montevideo	32	(15)
2018	Santa Tecla	19	(7)
2018–2021	Racing Montevideo	54	(11)
2021–2022	Cerro	19	(1)
2023	Villa Teresa	1	(0)
2024–	Río Negro	–	(–)
- * Club domestic league appearances and goals

Liber Daniel Quiñones Prieto (born February 11, 1985, in Montevideo, Uruguay) is a Uruguayan professional football forward who plays for Río Negro.

== Teams ==
- (Uruguay) Defensor Sporting (youth)
- (Uruguay) Racing de Montevideo 2006–2010
- (Chile) Cobreloa 2010
- (Uruguay) Racing de Montevideo 2011
- (Argentina) Gimnasia La Plata 2011
- (Uruguay) Racing de Montevideo 2012–2013
- (Uruguay) Danubio 2013
- (Mexico) Veracruz 2014
- (Peru) Universitario 2015
- (Uruguay) Racing de Montevideo 2015–2017
- (El Salvador) Santa Tecla 2018
- (Uruguay) Racing de Montevideo 2018–2021
- (Uruguay) Cerro 2021–2022
- (Uruguay) Villa Teresa 2023
- (Uruguay) Río Negro 2024–

== Honours ==
Racing Club de Montevideo

- Segunda División Uruguay: 2007–08
