= Mathías Saavedra =

Uruguayan footballer (born 1989)

Personal information
- Full name: Mathías Saavedra Perdomo
- Date of birth: April 30, 1989 (age 37)
- Place of birth: Montevideo, Uruguay
- Height: 1.81 m (5 ft 11 1/2 in)
- Position: Forward

Youth career
- 2005: Nacional
- 2005–2008: Boca Juniors

Senior career*
Years	Team	Apps	(Gls)
2008–2009	Nacional		
2009–2010	Boca Juniors		
2010–2011	Alcalá	0	(0)
2011	Danubio	2	(0)
2011–2012	El Tanque Sisley	7	(1)
2012	Huracán	5	(0)
2012–2013	Recreativo	0	(0)
2012–2013	→ CD San Roque (loan)	6	(1)
2013–2016	Sud América	4	(0)
2014	→ Torque (loan)	12	(9)
2014–2015	→ Tristán Suárez (loan)	23	(4)
2016–2017	River Plate	36	(13)
2018	Torque	3	(0)
2019	Rampla Juniors	26	(7)
2020	12 de Octubre	5	(0)
- * Club domestic league appearances and goals as of 21:02, 22 April 2020 (UTC)

Mathías Saavedra Perdomo (born April 30, 1989) is an Uruguayan footballer who plays as a forward.

Saavedra began his career in 2010 with Nacional. Since then, he has played for many different teams in Uruguay, Spain and Argentina.
