= Maureen Franco =

Uruguayan footballer (born 1983)

Personal information
- Full name: Maureen Javier Franco Alonso
- Date of birth: 13 December 1983 (age 42)
- Place of birth: Durazno, Uruguay
- Height: 1.79 m (5 ft 10 in)
- Position: Centre forward

Youth career
- 2000–2003: Nacional

Senior career*
Years	Team	Apps	(Gls)
2003–2007	Nacional	7	(0)
2005–2006	→ Cerrito (loan)		
2007–2012	Cerrito	87	(27)
2007–2008	→ Montevideo Wanderers (loan)	3	(0)
2009	→ Tacuarembó (loan)	12	(6)
2010	→ Chacarita Juniors (loan)	10	(0)
2011	→ Liverpool Montevideo (loan)	12	(3)
2011–2012	→ River Plate Montevideo (loan)	19	(5)
2012–2013	Rampla Juniors	10	(1)
2013	Sud América	14	(6)
2013–2014	Racing de Olavarría	9	(3)
2014	Técnico Universitario		
2014–2015	Sud América	27	(12)
2015–2016	BIT	14	(1)
2016–2018	Cerro	76	(38)
2019	Liverpool Montevideo	12	(4)
2019	Cerro	19	(5)
2020–2021	Fénix	52	(26)
2022	Cerro	14	(2)
2023	Sud América	12	(2)
- * Club domestic league appearances and goals

Maureen Javier Franco Alonso (born 13 December 1983), known as Maureen Franco (Spanish pronunciation: [ˈmawɾeɱ ˈfɾaŋko] (Note: In isolation, Maureen is pronounced [ˈmawɾen].)), is a Uruguayan former footballer who played as a striker.

== Career ==
Born in Durazno, Franco began playing club football with Nacional. After failing to break into the first team, Franco went on loan to Uruguayan Segunda División side Club Sportivo Cerrito. A season later, he joined Cerrito on a permanent basis and helped the club gain promotion to the first division. After scoring 13 goals in 14 matches to lead the 2009 Torneo Apertura, Franco earned a move to Argentine Primera División side Chacarita Juniors in January 2010.

In 2016, Franco joined Primera Division side C.A. Cerro. The following season, he scored 25 goals for the club (the second most in the league).
