= Leonardo Melazzi =

Uruguayan footballer (born 1991)

Personal information
- Full name: Leonardo Sebastián Melazzi Pinela
- Date of birth: 4 February 1991 (age 35)
- Place of birth: Montevideo, Uruguay
- Height: 1.76 m (5 ft 9 in)
- Position: Right winger

Senior career*
Years	Team	Apps	(Gls)
2009–2014	Danubio	47	(3)
2012	→ Genoa (loan)	2	(0)
2013	→ Fénix (loan)	7	(0)
2014	→ Miramar Misiones (loan)	11	(2)
2014–2015	Lugano	17	(2)
2015–2016	Chiasso	10	(1)
2016–2017	Miramar Misiones	10	(2)
2017	Sud América	35	(4)
2018	Deportes Iquique	4	(0)
2018	Liverpool Montevideo	3	(1)
2019	Rampla Juniors	12	(1)
2019–2021	Bellinzona	18	(0)
2022–2023	Rampla Juniors	42	(1)
2023	Juventud Las Piedras	16	(2)
2024	Locarno	2	(0)

International career
2010–2011	Uruguay U20		
- * Club domestic league appearances and goals

Leonardo Sebastián Melazzi Pinela (born 4 February 1991) is a Uruguayan professional footballer who plays as a right winger. He last played for FC Locarno.

Melazzi was capped by the Uruguay under-20 national team for the 2011 South American Youth Championship and for the pre-squad for the 2011 FIFA U-20 World Cup.
