= Jardines del Hipódromo María Mincheff de Lazaroff Stadium =

Sports stadium in Uruguay

Jardines Del Hipódromo
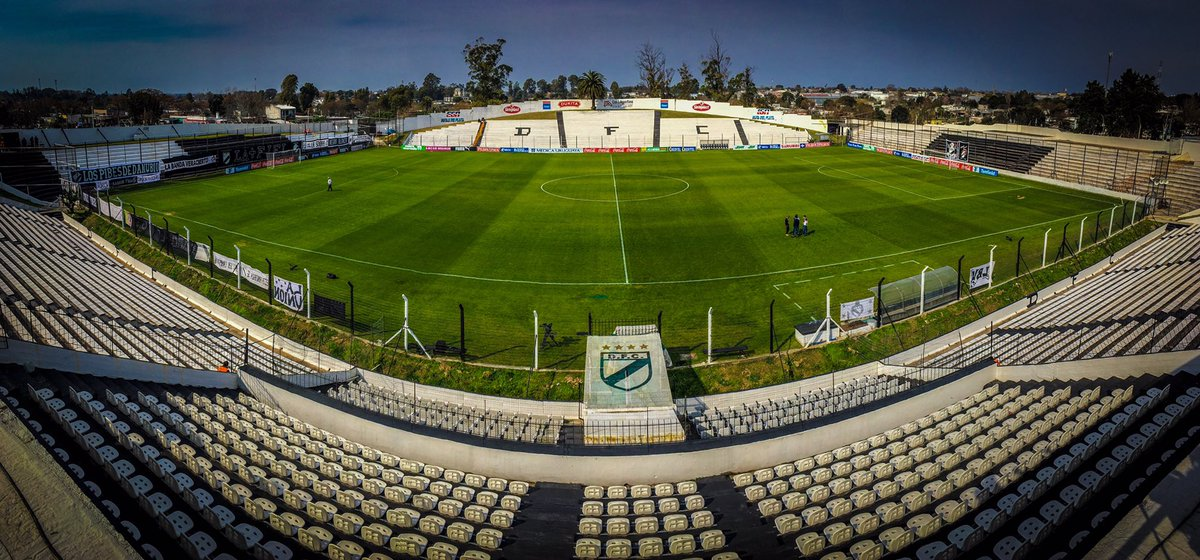
- The stadium in March 2019
- Interactive map of Jardines Del Hipódromo
- Full name: Estadio Jardines del Hipódromo María Mincheff de Lazaroff
- Address: Av. Carlos Nery; Montevideo; Uruguay
- Coordinates: 34°50′19.39″S 56°7′56.21″W
- Owner: Danubio F.C.
- Capacity: 11,018 (limited to 9,600 for high-risk matches)
- Surface: Lawn

Construction
- Opened: August 25, 1957
- Renovated: 1997
- Architect: Juan A. Gazzano

Tenant
- Danubio (1957–present)

Website
- danubio.org.uy/estadio

Jardines del Hipódromo María Mincheff de Lazaroff Stadium, popularly known as Jardines del Hipódromo, is a stadium located in the Jardines del Hipódromo neighborhood in Montevideo, Uruguay. Owned by the Danubio F.C., it is used primarily for association football matches.

It is the first stadium in Uruguay to bear the name of a woman, after, in May 2017, the club's members voted to add the name of María Mincheff de Lazaroff, mother of Miguel and Juan Lazaroff, co-founders of the club, to the stadium.

It has been under constant renovation since 1997. It has a capacity for 18,000 seated people, although in "high-risk" matches, for security reasons only 10,000 tickets are enabled.

In 2017, the stadium name was changed to Jardines del Hipódromo "María Mincheff de Lazaroff" after the mother of the founders of the club Miguel and Juan Lazaroff (of Bulgarian descent).

== History ==
The stadium was inaugurated in 1957, and is located in a neighborhood of the city of Montevideo, from which it takes its name. Before the venue was erected, there was a central square. The work, whose plans were drawn up honorarily by Arch. Luis A. Torres, with the collaboration of Architect Juan A. Gazzano, has gone through various stages of renovation and restructuring. In May 2017, Danubio's members voted to add the name of María Mincheff de Lazaroff, mother of Miguel and Juan Lazaroff, co-founders of the club, to the stadium.

43 years later, the "Gardens" was completed by building the missing side grandstand, made of reinforced concrete and with a capacity of 4,500 seated people. In addition, the field was completely redone, incorporating a drainage and underground irrigation system and placing a perimeter fence around the stage. The cost of the works was approximately US$ 350,000. The reopening celebration, on October 22, 2000, included the match of the 11th. round of Torneo Clausura between Danubio and Club Juventud The founders of the Club, Juan Lazaroff and Armando Olivera, kicked off the match that ended tied at 1.

In 2006, and in order to condition the stadium to be able to play international tournaments there, the civil and electrical construction was redone, the local and visitor changing rooms and the one corresponding to the judges were built anew, new booths were made and the Official Box was reformed with new toilets. The architects Fernando De Pablo and José Luis Mazzeo honorarily prepared the plans for the work and were in charge of jointly directing the work. One of the most peculiar characteristics of this stadium is that despite the reforms and advances it has undergone over time, it still preserves a natural palm tree in this stadium.
