= 2016 Campeonato Uruguayo Primera División =

113th season of the top-tier football league in Uruguay

Liga Profesional de Primera División
- Season: 2016
- Champions: Nacional (46th title)
- Relegated: Villa Española
- 2017 Copa Libertadores: Nacional; Montevideo Wanderers
- 2017 Copa Sudamericana: Danubio; Defensor Sporting; Liverpool; Boston River
- Top goalscorer: Gabriel Fernández; Pablo Silva (8 goals each)

The 2016 Liga Profesional de Primera División season, also known as the Campeonato Uruguayo Especial o Campeonato Transición, was the 113th season of Uruguay's top-flight football league, and the 86th in which it is professional. Peñarol was the defending champion.

== Teams ==
Locations of the 2016 season teams outside Montevideo.
Locations of the 2016 Primera División teams within Montevideo.

Club	City	Stadium	Capacity
Boston River	Montevideo	Juan Antonio Lavalleja	7,000
Cerro	Montevideo	Luis Tróccoli	24,000
Danubio	Montevideo	Jardines Del Hipódromo	14,401
Defensor Sporting	Montevideo	Luis Franzini	18,000
Fénix	Montevideo	Parque Capurro	5,500
Juventud	Las Piedras	Parque Artigas	5,500
Liverpool	Montevideo	Belvedere	10,000
Montevideo Wanderers	Montevideo	Parque Alfredo Víctor Viera	7,420
Nacional	Montevideo	Gran Parque Central	23,500
Peñarol	Montevideo	Campeón del Siglo	40,000
Plaza Colonia	Colonia	Suppici	12,000
Racing	Montevideo	Osvaldo Roberto	4,500
Rampla Juniors	Montevideo	Olímpico	9,500
River Plate	Montevideo	Parque Federico Omar Saroldi	5,624
Sud América	San José	Casto Martínez Laguarda	6,000
Villa Española	Montevideo	Obdulio Varela	8,000

== Standings ==
Pos	Team	Pld	W	D	L	GF	GA	GD	Pts	Qualification
1	Nacional	15	11	1	3	27	12	+15	34	2017 Copa Libertadores Group Stage
2	Montevideo Wanderers	15	8	5	2	22	14	+8	29	2017 Copa Libertadores First Stage
3	Danubio	15	9	2	4	24	18	+6	29	2017 Copa Sudamericana First Stage
4	Defensor Sporting	15	7	4	4	22	15	+7	25	2017 Copa Sudamericana First Stage
5	Liverpool	15	6	6	3	16	13	+3	24	2017 Copa Sudamericana First Stage
6	Boston River	15	5	7	3	19	11	+8	22	2017 Copa Sudamericana First Stage
7	Cerro	15	6	4	5	16	15	+1	22	
8	Racing	15	5	5	5	24	26	−2	20	
9	Fénix	15	5	4	6	19	19	0	19	
10	River Plate	15	5	3	7	18	28	−10	18	
11	Juventud	15	4	5	6	9	11	−2	17	
12	Sud América	15	5	2	8	17	20	−3	17	
13	Rampla Juniors	15	4	5	6	9	16	−7	17	
14	Peñarol	15	4	3	8	17	20	−3	15	
15	Plaza Colonia	15	2	6	7	16	24	−8	12	
16	Villa Española	15	1	4	10	14	26	−12	7	

Updated to match(es) played on December 11, 2016. Source: AUF
Rules for classification: 1) points; 2) goal difference; 3) number of goals scored.

Primera División
2016 Champions
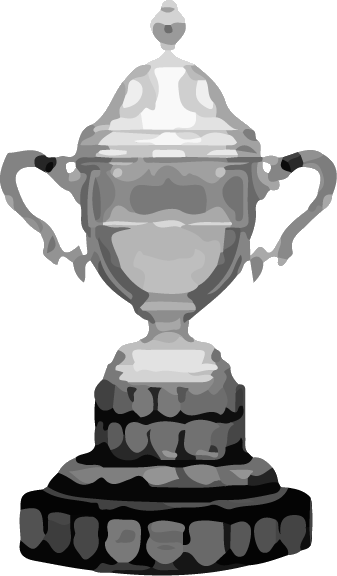

46th title

== Results ==
Home \ Away	BOR	CRR	DAN	DFS	FNX	JUV	LIV	WAN	NAC	PEÑ	PCO	RAC	RAJ	RIV	IASA	VES
Boston River		1–1	1–2	1–1			0–0			0–0		1–1	2–0			
Cerro			0–1			1–1	2–0	1–3	0–0			2–3	0–0	0–1		
Danubio						1–1	3–2	0–1	2–1	3–2	3–0			2–1		1–0
Defensor Sporting		0–1	0–0			0–1	1–3	1–1	3–2			2–1			2–0	
Fénix	1–1	0–1	4–1	3–1			1–0		0–1			3–1			1–2	
Juventud	0–1				0–0					1–0	2–0			0–0	2–0	1–1
Liverpool						1–0		2–1	2–1		1–1			2–2	1–1	1–0
Montevideo Wanderers	1–0				4–2	1–0			1–3		0–0			1–1	2–1	3–1
Nacional	1–0					2–0					3–2	3–1	2–0	3–1	1–0	
Peñarol		1–2		0–2	2–0		0–0	0–1	0–3							2–1
Plaza Colonia	2–2	2–3		0–1	2–0					0–0		1–1	1–1		0–3	
Racing			4–2			2–0	0–1	1–1		2–5			2–1	2–1		
Rampla Juniors			2–1	0–1	0–0	1–0	0–0	1–1		1–0				0–2		
River Plate	1–5			0–5	1–2					3–1	2–1				0–3	2–1
Sud América	0–1	0–2	0–2							1–4		2–2	3–0			1–0
Villa Española	0–3	2–0		2–2	2–2				0–1		2–4	1–1	1–2			

Updated to match(es) played on 11 December 2016. Source: Soccerway
Legend: Blue = home team win; Yellow = draw; Red = away team win.

== Top goalscorers ==
Rank	Name	Club	Goals
1	(Uruguay) Gabriel Fernández	Racing	8
1	(Uruguay) Pablo Silva	Villa Española	8
3	(Uruguay) Líber Quiñones	Racing	7
3	(Uruguay) Federico Rodríguez	Boston River	7
5	(Uruguay) Sebastián Fernández	Nacional	6
5	(Uruguay) Maureen Franco	Cerro	6
5	(Uruguay) Martín Ligüera	Nacional	6

Source: Soccerway

== Relegation ==
Pos	Team	2014–15 Pts	2015–16 Pts	2016 Pts	Total Pts	Total Pld	Avg	Relegation
1	Nacional	63	54	34	151	74	2.041	
2	Peñarol	55	58	15	128	74	1.73	
3	Defensor Sporting	48	42	25	115	75	1.533	
4	Danubio	49	35	29	113	75	1.507	
5	River Plate	54	41	18	113	75	1.507	
6	Montevideo Wanderers	34	48	29	111	75	1.48	
7	Boston River	—	—	22	22	15	1.467	
8	Cerro	34	52	22	108	75	1.44	
9	Liverpool	—	40	24	64	45	1.422	
10	Fénix	37	46	19	102	75	1.36	
11	Sud América	42	43	17	102	75	1.36	
12	Plaza Colonia	—	49	12	61	45	1.356	
13	Racing	45	31	20	96	75	1.28	
14	Juventud	45	33	17	95	75	1.267	
15	Rampla Juniors	—	—	17	17	15	1.133	
16	Villa Española	—	—	7	7	15	0.467	Relegation to Segunda División
