= Estadio Obdulio Varela =

Estadio Obdulio Jacinto Varela
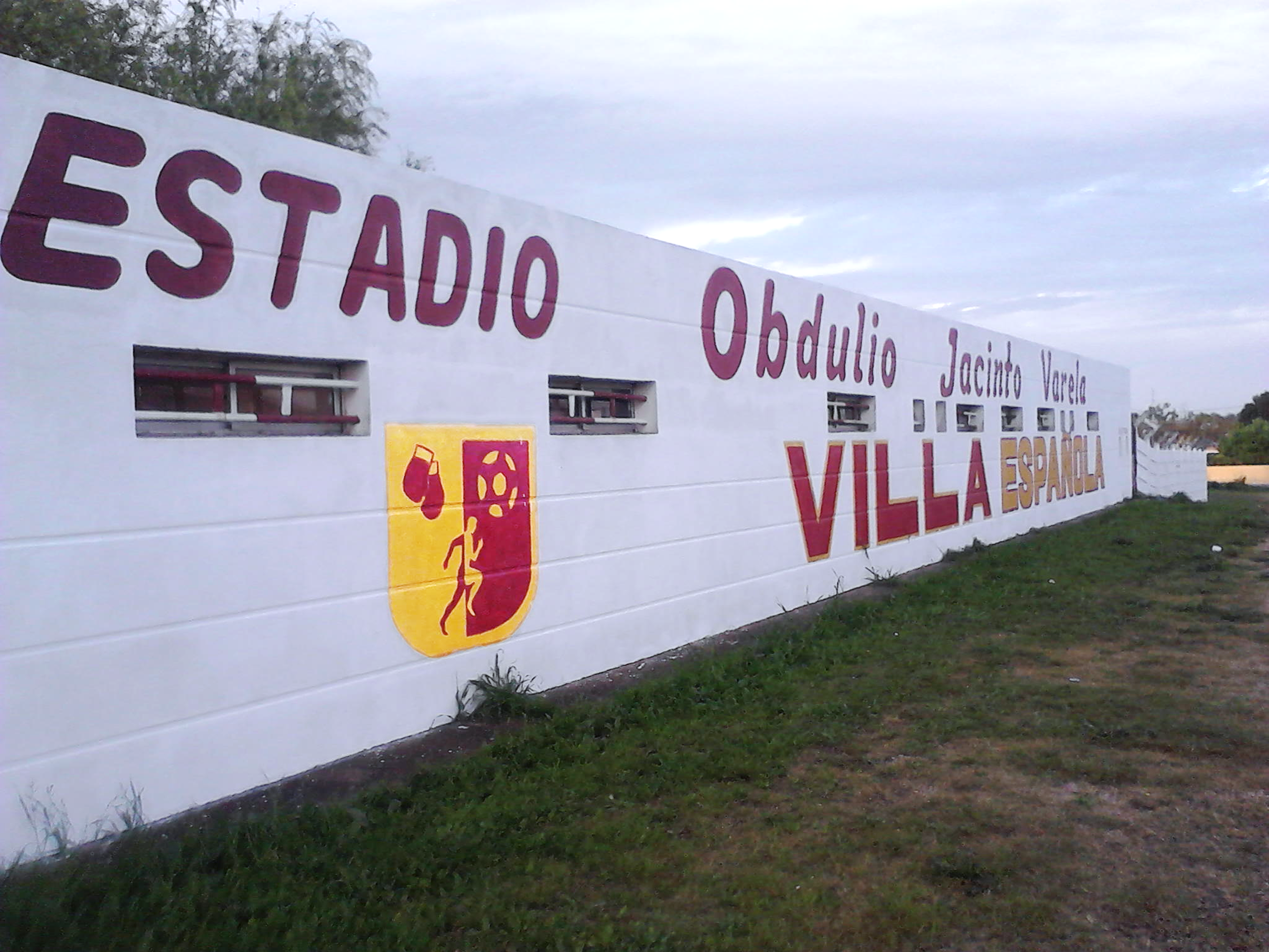
- Estadio Obdulio Jacinto Varel
- Interactive map of Estadio Obdulio Jacinto Varela
- Full name: Estadio Obdulio Varela
- Location: Montevideo, Uruguay
- Coordinates: 34°51′29.66″S 56°7′20.78″W
- Capacity: 8,000
- Surface: grass

Construction
- Opened: 2002

Tenant
- Villa Española

Estadio Obdulio Varela is a multi-use stadium in Montevideo, Uruguay. It is currently used mostly for football matches and serves as the home stadium for Villa Española of the Primera División Uruguaya. The stadium holds 8,000 spectators and opened in 2002.
