= Estadio Osvaldo Roberto =

Football stadium in Montevideo, Uruguay

- Parque Osvaldo Roberto
- Interactive map of Estadio Osvaldo Roberto
- Location: Sayago, Montevideo, Uruguay
- Coordinates: 34°50′11.88″S 56°12′59.65″W
- Owner: Racing Club de Montevideo
- Capacity: 8,500
- Surface: grass

Construction
- Opened: October 5, 1941

Tenant
- Racing Club de Montevideo

The Estadio Osvaldo Roberto (also known as Parque Osvaldo Roberto) is a football stadium located in Montevideo, Uruguay, in the Sayago neighborhood at the intersection of Ave. Sayago and Ave. Millan streets. The stadium's capacity is 8,500 people. It is the home ground of Racing Club de Montevideo. The stadium was opened in 1941.

The stadium is named after the founder and a former player of Racing Club de Montevideo, Osvaldo Roberto.
