= 2021 River Plate Montevideo season =

River Plate
2021 season
- President: Willie Tucci
- Head coach: (Uruguay) Gustavo Díaz (since April)
- Stadium: Estadio Saroldi
- Uruguayan Primera División: 8th
- Top goalscorer: League: (Uruguay) Matías Arezo (16 goals); All: (Uruguay) Matías Arezo (16 goals)
Home colours	Away colours	Third colours

River Plate took part in Uruguayan Primera División reaching 8th position and qualifying for 2022 Copa Sudamericana.

== Transfer Window ==
=== Summer 2021 ===
==== In ====
Position	Nationality	Name	Age	From	Fee	Transfer Window	Ref.
GK	(Uruguay)	Salvador Ichazo	29	Danubio	Free agent	Summer	Tenfield
MF	(Uruguay)	Robert Herrera	32	Peñarol	Free agent	Summer	Tenfield
MF	(Uruguay)	Patricio Gregorio	22	Villa Española	on loan (from Nacional)	Summer	Tenfield
FW	(Uruguay)	Luciano Boggio	22	Defensor Sporting	on loan	Summer	Tenfield
MF	(Uruguay)	Gonzalo Nápoli	20	Defensor Sporting	on loan	Summer	Tenfield
FW	(Uruguay)	Gonzalo Castro	36	Nacional	Free agent	Summer	Ovacion
FW	(Uruguay)	Cristian Martín	23	Tacuarembó	Return from loan	Summer	Tenfield
FW	(Uruguay)	Joaquín Lavega	16	Reserves	-	Summer	Tenfield

==== Out ====
Position	Nationality	Name	Age	To	Fee	Transfer Window	Ref.
MF	(Uruguay)	Ribair Rodríguez	33	Danubio	Free Agent	Summer	Ovacion
FW	(Uruguay)	Juan Manuel Olivera	39	Danubio	Free Agent	Summer	Tenfield
DF	(Uruguay)	Gonzalo Viera	34	Atenas	Free Agent	Summer	El Observador
DF	(Uruguay)	Claudio Herrera	33	-	Free Agent	Summer	Tenfield
MF	(Uruguay)	Facundo Ospitaleche	24	Fénix	Free Agent	Summer	Tenfield
DF	(Uruguay)	Facundo Silvera	24	Villa Teresa	Free Agent	Summer	Tenfield
MF	(Uruguay)	Maximiliano Calzada	30	Cerrito	Free Agent	Summer	Tenfield
MF	(Uruguay)	Sebastián Píriz	31	Defensor Sporting	Free Agent	Summer	Ovacion
DF	(Uruguay)	Jair Ferreira	22	Basáñez	Free Agent	Summer	Tenfield
FW	(Uruguay)	Matías Alonso	35	Uruguay Montevideo	Free Agent	Summer	Tenfield
DF	(Uruguay)	Iván Silva	27	Tacuarembó	Free Agent	Summer	Tenfield

=== Winter 2021 ===
==== In ====
Position	Nationality	Name	Age	From	Fee	Transfer Window	Ref.
DF	(Uruguay)	Felipe Carvalho	27	(Bolivia) Bolívar	Free agent	Winter	Tenfield
FW	(Uruguay)	Mauricio Affonso	29	(South Africa) Mamelodi Sundowns	Free agent	Winter	Tenfield
MF	(Uruguay)	Pablo González	26	Tacuarembó	Free agent	Winter	Tenfield
MF	(Uruguay)	Pablo García	22	Nacional	Loan	Winter	Tenfield

==== Out ====
Position	Nationality	Name	Age	To	Fee	Transfer Window	Ref.
DF	(Uruguay)	Horacio Salaberry	34	(Ecuador) Guayaquil City	Free Agent	Winter	Ecuagol
MF	(Uruguay)	Diego Vicente	23	Danubio	Loan	Winter	Tenfield
FW	(Uruguay)	Nicolás González	24	Boston River	End of loan	Winter	Tenfield
DF	(Uruguay)	Guzmán Rodríguez	21	Boston River	End of loan	Winter	Tenfield

== Squad ==
=== First team squad ===
As of Nov 4, 2021

Note: Flags indicate national team as defined under FIFA eligibility rules; some limited exceptions apply. Players may hold more than one non-FIFA nationality.

No.	Pos.	Nation	Player
1	GK	URU	Salvador Ichazo
3	DF	URU	Santiago Brunelli
4	DF	URU	Felipe Carvalho
5	DF	URU	Tiago Galletto
7	DF	URU	Nicolás Rodríguez
8	MF	URU	Juan Pablo Plada
9	FW	URU	Matías Arezo
10	MF	URU	Facundo Boné
11	FW	URU	Gonzalo Castro
12	GK	URU	Lucas Machado
14	MF	URU	Gonzalo Nápoli
15	MF	URU	Pablo García
17	MF	URU	Marcos Montiel

No.	Pos.	Nation	Player
18	FW	URU	Mauricio Affonso
19	FW	URU	Thiago Borbas
20	MF	URU	Patricio Gregorio
21	MF	URU	Facundo Bonifazi
22	DF	URU	Santiago Pérez
23	FW	URU	Luciano Boggio
24	MF	URU	Pablo González
25	GK	URU	Fabrizio Correa
26	DF	URU	Robert Herrera
27	MF	URU	Juan Ignacio Quintana
28	MF	URU	José Neris
30	MF	URU	Adrián Leites
33	FW	URU	Joaquín Lavega

=== Top scorers ===
Last updated on Dec 5, 2021

Rank	Pos.	No.	Name	Primera División
1	FW	9	(Uruguay) Matías Arezo	16
2	FW	19	(Uruguay) Thiago Borbas	7
3	MF	23	(Uruguay) Luciano Boggio	5
4	MF	11	(Uruguay) Gonzalo Castro	3
4	FW	30	(Uruguay) Adrián Leites	3
5	MF	5	(Uruguay) Tiago Galletto	2
5	MF	17	(Uruguay) Marcos Montiel	2
5	DF	21	(Uruguay) Facundo Bonifazi	2
6	DF	4	(Uruguay) Horacio Salaberry	1
6	MF	7	(Uruguay) Nicolás Rodríguez	1
6	MF	10	(Uruguay) Facundo Boné	1
6	FW	15	(Uruguay) Pablo García	1
6	FW	18	(Uruguay) Mauricio Affonso	1
Total				45

=== Disciplinary record ===
Last updated on Dec 6, 2021

No.	Pos	Nat	Name	Primera División		
No.	Pos	Nat	Name	Yellow card	(yellow card) (yellow-red card)	Red card
Goalkeepers
1	GK	(Uruguay)	Salvador Ichazo	5	0	0
12	GK	(Uruguay)	Lucas Machado	0	0	0
25	FW	(Uruguay)	Fabrizio Correa	0	0	0
Defenders
3	DF	(Uruguay)	Santiago Brunelli	4	0	0
4	DF	(Uruguay)	Felipe Carvalho	0	0	0
6	DF	(Uruguay)	Santiago Pérez	0	0	0
21	DF	(Uruguay)	Facundo Bonifazi	10	0	1
26	DF	(Uruguay)	Robert Herrera	3	0	0
Midfielders
MF
5	MF	(Uruguay)	Tiago Galletto	4	0	0
7	MF	(Uruguay)	Nicolás Rodríguez	5	0	0
8	MF	(Uruguay)	Juan Pablo Plada	1	0	0
10	MF	(Uruguay)	Facundo Boné	1	0	0
14	MF	(Uruguay)	Gonzalo Nápoli	5	0	0
15	MF	(Uruguay)	Pablo García	5	0	0
17	DF	(Uruguay)	Marcos Montiel	10	0	0
20	MF	(Uruguay)	Patricio Gregorio	0	0	0
24	MF	(Uruguay)	Pablo González	0	0	0
27	MF	(Uruguay)	Juan Ignacio Quintana	1	0	0
30	MF	(Uruguay)	Adrián Leites	0	0	0
Forwards
9	FW	(Uruguay)	Matías Arezo	7	0	0
11	MF	(Uruguay)	Gonzalo Castro	2	0	0
18	FW	(Uruguay)	Mauricio Affonso	0	0	0
19	FW	(Uruguay)	Thiago Borbas	3	0	0
23	FW	(Uruguay)	Luciano Boggio	5	0	0
28	FW	(Uruguay)	José Neris	1	0	0
33	FW	(Uruguay)	Joaquín Lavega	2	0	0
Players transferred out during the season
	DF	(Uruguay)	Horacio Salaberry	3	1	0
	DF	(Uruguay)	Guzmán Rodríguez	2	0	0
	MF	(Uruguay)	Diego Vicente	0	0	0
	FW	(Uruguay)	Nicolás González	0	0	0
Total				79	1	1

== Primera División ==
=== Apertura 2021 ===
==== League table ====
Pos	Team	Pld	W	D	L	GF	GA	GD	Pts	Qualification
1	Plaza Colonia	15	11	3	1	20	7	+13	36	Qualification for Championship playoff
2	Nacional	15	9	2	4	23	14	+9	29	
3	Peñarol	15	7	7	1	22	10	+12	28	
4	Liverpool	15	8	3	4	38	20	+18	27	
5	River Plate	15	7	5	3	27	20	+7	26	
6	Montevideo City Torque	15	8	1	6	26	19	+7	25	
7	Fénix	15	6	3	6	20	22	−2	21	
8	Cerro Largo	15	6	2	7	20	22	−2	20	
9	Cerrito	15	5	4	6	14	15	−1	19	
10	Sud América	15	5	3	7	15	22	−7	18	
11	Montevideo Wanderers	15	5	2	8	12	16	−4	17	
12	Rentistas	15	4	4	7	12	21	−9	16	
13	Boston River	15	3	5	7	14	19	−5	14	
14	Deportivo Maldonado	15	3	5	7	11	22	−11	14	
15	Progreso	15	2	5	8	13	26	−13	11	
16	Villa Española	15	1	6	8	14	26	−12	9	

Source: AUF, Soccerway
Rules for classification: 1) Points, 2) Playoff game, in case two teams are tied for first place.
If there are more than two teams tied in points: 2) Goal difference, 3) Goals for, 4) Head-to-head record, 5) Drawing of lots, 6) Playoff game, in case two teams are still tied for first place.

==== Results by round ====
Round	1	2	3	4	5	6	7	8	9	10	11	12	13	14	15
Ground	A	H	A	A	H	A	H	A	H	A	H	A	H	A	H
Result	L	W	D	W	W	W	L	W	D	W	D	L	D	D	W
Position	15	9	9	6	3	1	5	4	4	2	3	5	5	5	5

A = Away; H = Home; W = Win; D = Draw; L = Loss

==== Matches ====
Win Draw Loss Postponed

May 17, 2021 1	Cerrito	3-1	River Plate	Montevideo
19:30 UTC−3	Silvera 56' (yellow card) 88'; Ferreira 71'; M. Pérez 90+3'; Núñez (yellow card) 55'; Goyeni (yellow card) 68'; Pimienta (yellow card) 77'	Report	Bonifazi 58'; Salaberry (yellow card) 25' (yellow-red card) 53'; Galletto (yellow card) 43'; N. Rodríguez (yellow card) 86'; Montiel (yellow card) 90'	Stadium: Charrúa; Referee: Santiago Motta

May 24, 2021 2	River Plate	3-2	Liverpool	Montevideo
15:00 UTC−3	Boggio 61' (yellow card) 62'; N. Rodríguez 64'; Borbas 90+2'; Arezo (yellow card) 39'; Montiel (yellow card) 40'; Galletto (yellow card) 64'	Report	Ramírez 19' 38' (yellow card) 49'; Chacón (yellow card) 23'; Figueredo (yellow card) 40'; Díaz (yellow card) 43'	Stadium: Saroldi; Referee: Jonathan Fuentes

May 30, 2021 3	Deportivo Maldonado	0-0	River Plate	Maldonado
15:00 UTC−3	Lima (yellow card) 48'; González (yellow card) 55'; Tealde (yellow card) 85'	Report	Montiel (yellow card) 57'; Lavega (yellow card) 90+4'	Stadium: Campus; Referee: Mathías de Armas

Jun 6, 2021 4	Cerro Largo	2-4	River Plate	Melo
17:15 UTC−3	Otormín 45+1'; Cayetano 63'; Etcheverry (yellow card) 2'	Report	Borbas 17'; Arezo 32' 88' 90+6' (yellow card) 80'; Salaberry (yellow card) 58'; Nápoli (yellow card) 70'	Stadium: Ubilla; Referee: Diego Rodríguez

Jun 12, 2021 5	River Plate	4-0	Progreso	Montevideo
15:00 UTC−3	Salaberry 24'; Borbas 35'; Bonifazi 38' (yellow card) 18'; Castro 71'; Ichazo (yellow card) 64'; Boggio (yellow card) 66'	Report	Gallardo (yellow card) 90'	Stadium: Saroldi; Referee: José Burgos

Jun 19, 2021 6	Sud América	1-2	River Plate	Montevideo
10:00 UTC−3	Giménez 38'; Andrade (yellow card) 66'; G. D. Rodríguez (yellow card) 79'	Report	Arezo 75' 90+5'; Nápoli (yellow card) 16'; Salaberry (yellow card) 23'; Borbas (yellow card) 49'	Stadium: Jardines; Referee: Diego Ribeiro

Jun 22, 2021 7	River Plate	0-1	Plaza Colonia	Montevideo
15:00 UTC−3	Bonifazi (yellow card) 87'; Neris (yellow card) 90+2'; Ichazo (yellow card) 90+3'	Report	C. Rodríguez 47'	Stadium: Saroldi; Referee: Gustavo Tejera

Jun 26, 2021 8	Fénix	3-4	River Plate	Montevideo
15:00 UTC−3	Nequecaur 33'; Herrera 69' (o.g.); Franco 90+5'; Alfaro (yellow card) 24'; Núñez (yellow card) 67'	Report	Arezo 49' 62'; Boggio 60'; Boné 90+2'; Quintana (yellow card) 86'; Salaberry (yellow card) 90'; N. Rodríguez (yellow card) 90+1'	Stadium: Capurro; Referee: Javier Feres

Jul 3, 2021 9	River Plate	1-1	Boston River	Montevideo
14:00 UTC−3	Arezo 90+2'; G. Rodríguez (yellow card) 2'; Bonifazi (yellow card) 8'	Report	Bentancourt 25'; Nadruz (yellow card) 90'; Lozano (yellow card) 90'	Stadium: Saroldi; Referee: Yimmi Álvarez

Jul 10, 2021 10	Wanderers	1-2	River Plate	Montevideo
17:15 UTC−3	Quagliata 21'; Abero (yellow card) 15'; Veglio (yellow card) 43'; López (yellow card) 90+3'	Report	Borbas 1'; Arezo 81'; N. Rodríguez (yellow card) 47'; Bonifazi (yellow card) 55'	Stadium: Viera; Referee: Diego Ribeiro

Jul 17, 2021 11	River Plate	0-0	Rentistas	Montevideo
12:45 UTC−3		Report	R. González (yellow card) 68'; Sosa (yellow card) 90+2'	Stadium: Saroldi; Referee: Andrés Matonte

Aug 1, 2021 12	Peñarol	2-0	River Plate	Ciudad de la Costa
18:00 UTC−3	Álvarez Martínez 17'; Torres 31'; C. Rodríguez (yellow card) 28'; Musto (yellow card) 85'	Report	G. Rodríguez (yellow card) 47'; Borbas (yellow card) 58'; Montiel (yellow card) 61'	Stadium: CDS; Referee: Antonio García

Aug 7, 2021 13	River Plate	3-3	MCT	Montevideo
15:00 UTC−3	Borbas 44'; Montiel 51' (yellow card) 86'; Leites 77'; Nápoli (yellow card) 14'; Arezo (yellow card) 55'; Bonifazi (yellow card) 61'	Report	Chocobar 88'; Guerrero 90'; Peña 90+5'; L. Rodríguez (yellow card) 35'; Teuten (yellow card) 90+3'; Pizzichillo (yellow card) 90'	Stadium: Saroldi; Referee: Esteban Ostojich

Aug 15, 2021 14	Villa Española	1-1	River Plate	Montevideo
13:15 UTC−3	P. Silva 48' (yellow card) 26'; Albín (yellow card) 27'; Puente (yellow card) 76'; Ramírez (yellow card) 90+2'	Report	Arezo 60'; Ichazo (yellow card) 58'	Stadium: Varela; Referee: Pablo Giménez

Aug 21, 2021 15	River Plate	2-0	Nacional	Montevideo
15:00 UTC−3	Arezo 45'; Boggio 51'; Montiel (yellow card) 33'; Nápoli (yellow card) 73'	Report	Méndez (yellow card) 23'; Trasante (yellow card) 39'; Bergessio (yellow card) 41' (yellow-red card) 90+3'; Martínez (yellow card) 46'	Stadium: Saroldi; Referee: Diego Ribeiro

=== Clausura 2021 ===
==== League table ====
Pos	Team	Pld	W	D	L	GF	GA	GD	Pts	Qualification
1	Peñarol	15	9	5	1	27	11	+16	32	Qualification for Championship playoff
2	Nacional (Note: Nacional were awarded two points and Cerro Largo were deducted one point due to a breach of rules by Cerro Largo manager Danielo Núñez during the match between both teams.)	15	8	4	3	23	15	+8	30	
3	Montevideo Wanderers	15	8	3	4	23	18	+5	27	
4	Cerro Largo	15	6	9	0	24	11	+13	26	
5	Montevideo City Torque	15	7	4	4	26	19	+7	25	
6	Progreso	15	7	4	4	12	7	+5	25	
7	Boston River	15	6	5	4	24	24	0	23	
8	Cerrito	15	6	3	6	20	22	−2	21	
9	Plaza Colonia	15	5	5	5	20	18	+2	20	
10	Fénix	15	4	7	4	18	18	0	19	
11	River Plate	15	4	4	7	18	22	−4	16	
12	Liverpool	15	4	3	8	15	19	−4	15	
13	Deportivo Maldonado	15	4	3	8	12	18	−6	15	
14	Rentistas	15	4	2	9	18	24	−6	14	
15	Sud América	15	3	4	8	14	26	−12	13	
16	Villa Española	15	1	3	11	12	34	−22	6	

Source: AUF, Soccerway
Rules for classification: 1) Points, 2) Playoff game, in case two teams are tied for first place.
If there are more than two teams tied in points: 2) Goal difference, 3) Goals for, 4) Head-to-head record, 5) Drawing of lots, 6) Playoff game, in case two teams are still tied for first place.

==== Results by round ====
Round	1	2	3	4	5	6	7	8	9	10	11	12	13	14	15
Ground	H	A	H	H	A	H	A	H	A	H	A	H	A	H	A
Result	W	L	L	L	L	W	D	D	W	L	L	D	D	W	L
Position	6	9	13	14	14	12	13	13	11	11	13	13	14	12	11

A = Away; H = Home; W = Win; D = Draw; L = Loss

==== Matches ====
Win Draw Loss Postponed

Sep 11, 2021 1	River Plate	1-0	Cerrito	Montevideo
15:30 UTC−3	Arezo 66'; Montiel (yellow card) 18'; Boné (yellow card) 18'	Report	Ortíz (yellow card) 77'	Stadium: Saroldi; Referee: Daniel Fedorczuk

Sep 19, 2021 2	Liverpool	3-1	River Plate	Montevideo
12:30 UTC−3	Martínez 35'; Fernández 80'; Martirena 88'; Díaz (yellow card) 5'; G. Pérez (yellow card) 63'; Chacón (red card) 69'	Report	Borbas 61'; Montiel (yellow card) 23'; P. García (yellow card) 64'	Stadium: Belvedere; Referee: Andrés Cunha

Sep 25, 2021 3	River Plate	1-2	Deportivo Maldonado	Montevideo
13:15 UTC−3	Arezo 90+6' (yellow card) 74'; Bonifazi (yellow card) 37'; Castro (yellow card) 58'; Herrera (yellow card) 89'; Ichazo (yellow card) 90+3'	Report	Viatri 44'; Darias 90+3'; Varela (yellow card) 60'; Núñez (yellow card) 76'	Stadium: Saroldi; Referee: Andrés Matonte

Oct 2, 2021 4	River Plate	0-4	Cerro Largo	Montevideo
15:30 UTC−3		Report	Brasil 8' (yellow card) 81' di Yorio 60'; Cayetano 65'; Onetto 84'	Stadium: Saroldi; Referee: Yimmi Álvarez

Oct 9, 2021 5	Progreso	1-0	River Plate	Montevideo
10:15 UTC−3	Olaizola 2'; Barboza (yellow card) 89'	Report	Brunelli (yellow card) 6'; Bonifazi (yellow card) 44'; Arezo (yellow card) 50'; N. Rodríguez (yellow card) 72'; Plada (yellow card) 90+3'	Stadium: Paladino; Referee: Fernando Falce

Oct 16, 2021 6	River Plate	5-1	Sud América	Montevideo
10:30 UTC−3	Castro 22' 71'; García 26' (yellow card) 66'; Affonso 83'; N. Rodríguez (yellow card) 28'	Report	Mouche 38'; Toma (yellow card) 19'; G. Rodríguez (yellow card) 46'; Barán (yellow card) 85'	Stadium: Paladino; Referee: Christian Ferreyra

Oct 20, 2021 7	Plaza Colonia	0-0	River Plate	Colonia del Sacramento
17:30 UTC−3	Olivera (yellow card) 45'; C. Rodríguez (yellow card) 58'; López (yellow card) 77'; Suhr (yellow card) 83'	Report	Arezo (yellow card) 45'; Bonifazi (yellow card) 81'; Boggio (yellow card) 84'	Stadium: Prandi; Referee: Andrés Matonte

Oct 25, 2021 8	River Plate	0-0	Fénix	Montevideo
16:00 UTC−3	Brunelli (yellow card) 18'; Montiel (yellow card) 20'	Report	Toledo (yellow card) 32'; Ramos (yellow card) 80'; Álvez (yellow card) 82'; Sosa (yellow card) 90+3'	Stadium: Saroldi; Referee: Javier Feres

Oct 30, 2021 9	Boston River	1-2	River Plate	Las Piedras
10:15 UTC−3	F. Rodríguez 63'; Álvarez (yellow card) 15'; Romero (yellow card) 19'; G. Rodríguez (yellow card) 81'	Report	Galletto 78'; Arezo 83'; Herrera (yellow card) 21'; Bonifazi (red card) 60'; Ichazo (yellow card) 71'	Stadium: Parque Artigas; Referee: Diego Ribeiro

Nov 3, 2021 10	River Plate	0-1	Wanderers	Montevideo
9:45 UTC−3	Brunelli (yellow card) 3'; Montiel (yellow card) 36'; Galletto (yellow card) 39'; Castro (yellow card) 61'	Report	Veglio 90+3'; Aguirre (yellow card) 35'; Tellechea (yellow card) 36'; Blanco (yellow card) 90+5'	Stadium: Saroldi; Referee: José Burgos

Nov 6, 2021 11	Rentistas	1-0	River Plate	Montevideo
16:30 UTC−3	Viduez 23'; S. Rodríguez (yellow card) 42'; Duarte (yellow card) 72'; Urretaviscaya (yellow card) 81'; Morales (yellow card) 83'; Rossi (yellow card) 90'	Report	Brunelli (yellow card) 38'; Galletto (yellow card) 68'; Arezo (yellow card) 78'	Stadium: Capurro; Referee: Nicolás Vignolo

Nov 14, 2021 12	River Plate	1-1	Peñarol	Montevideo
16:30 UTC−3	Galletto 16'; Herrera (yellow card) 90+7'	Report	Ceppelini 67'	Stadium: Saroldi; Referee: Andrés Matonte

Nov 22, 2021 13	MCT	1-1	River Plate	Montevideo
19:00 UTC−3	Teuten 62'; Pizzichillo (yellow card) 37'; Pereira (yellow card) 41'; Pereyra (yellow card) 90+5'; Brun (yellow card) 90+6'	Report	Arezo 66'; Nápoli (yellow card) 88'; Lavega (yellow card) 90+5'; García (yellow card) 90+6'	Stadium: Franzini; Referee: Fernando Falce

Nov 30, 2021 14	River Plate	4-2	Villa Española	Montevideo
09:45 UTC−3	Leites 32'; Arezo 57'; Boggio 77' 85' (yellow card) 87'; P. García (yellow card) 45'; Borbas (yellow card) 54'; Bonifazi (yellow card) 90+2'	Report	López 74'; Ramírez 84'; Tizón (yellow card) 57'; Santucho (yellow card) 61'; Puente (yellow card) 82'; Olivera (yellow card) 88'; Albín (yellow card) 90'	Stadium: Saroldi; Referee: Nicolás Vignolo

Dec 4, 2021 15	Nacional	4-2	River Plate	Montevideo
17:00 UTC−3	Almeida 28'; Brunelli 53' (o.g.) 61' (o.g.); Fernández 62' (yellow card) 23'	Report	Borbas 1'; Montiel 90+1'; Bonifazi (yellow card) 45'; Boggio (yellow card) 59'	Stadium: GPC; Referee: Daniel Fedorczuk

=== Overall ===
==== League table ====
Pos	Team	Pld	W	D	L	GF	GA	GD	Pts	Qualification
1	Peñarol (Q)	30	16	12	2	49	21	+28	60	Qualification for Championship playoff and Copa Libertadores group stage
2	Nacional (Note: Nacional were awarded two points and Cerro Largo were deducted one point due to a breach of rules by Cerro Largo manager Danielo Núñez during the Torneo Clausura match between both teams.) (T)	30	17	6	7	46	29	+17	59	Qualification for Copa Libertadores group stage
3	Plaza Colonia (T)	30	16	8	6	40	25	+15	56	Qualification for Championship playoff and Copa Libertadores second stage
4	Montevideo City Torque (Q)	30	15	5	10	52	38	+14	50	Qualification for Copa Libertadores first stage
5	Cerro Largo (Q)	30	12	11	7	44	33	+11	46	Qualification for Copa Sudamericana first stage
6	Montevideo Wanderers (Q)	30	13	5	12	35	34	+1	44	Qualification for Copa Sudamericana first stage
7	Liverpool (Q)	30	12	6	12	53	39	+14	42	Qualification for Copa Sudamericana first stage
8	River Plate (Q)	30	11	9	10	45	42	+3	42	Qualification for Copa Sudamericana first stage
9	Fénix	30	10	10	10	38	40	−2	40	
10	Cerrito	30	11	7	12	34	37	−3	40	
11	Boston River	30	9	9	12	38	44	−6	36	
12	Progreso	30	9	9	12	25	33	−8	36	
13	Deportivo Maldonado	30	8	7	15	24	40	−16	31	
14	Sud América	30	8	7	15	29	48	−19	31	
15	Rentistas	30	8	6	16	30	45	−15	30	
16	Villa Española	30	2	9	19	26	60	−34	15	

Source: AUF
Rules for classification: 1) Points, 2) Playoff game, in case two teams are tied for first place.
If there are more than two teams tied in points: 2) Goal difference, 3) Goals for, 4) Head-to-head record, 5) Drawing of lots, 6) Playoff game, in case two teams are still tied for first place.
(Q) Qualified for the phase indicated; (T) Qualified, but not yet for the particular phase indicated
