= 2020 River Plate Montevideo season =

River Plate
2020 season
- President: Willie Tucci
- Head coach: Jorge Fossati (since January 1st)
- Stadium: Estadio Saroldi
- Uruguayan Primera División: 8th
- Top goalscorer: League: Matías Arezo (13 goals); All: Matías Arezo (15 goals)
Home colours	Away colours	Third colours

River Plate took part both in the Uruguayan Primera División, and 2020 Copa Sudamericana. Season was abruptly suspended in March 2020, due to COVID-19 outbreak appearances all over the country, and resumed in August 2020.

== Transfer Window ==
=== Summer 2020 ===
==== In ====
Position	Nationality	Name	Age	From	Fee	Transfer Window	Ref.
FW	(Uruguay)	Facundo Boné	24	(Brazil) Vila Nova	Return from loan	Summer	Tenfield
MF	(Uruguay)	Ribair Rodríguez	32	(Argentina) Newell's Old Boys	Free Agent	Summer	depo.com.ar
FW	(Uruguay)	Nicolás González	22	Defensor Sporting	Free Agent	Summer	Ovación
GK	(Uruguay)	Fabrizio Correa	19	-	Reserves	Summer	Tenfield
FW	(Uruguay)	Thiago Borbas	17	-	Reserves	Summer	Tenfield
FW	(Uruguay)	Juan Ignacio Quintana	20	-	Reserves	Summer	Tenfield
FW	(Uruguay)	Mauro Da Luz	25	(Argentina) Colón	Return from loan	Summer	Tenfield
MF	(Uruguay)	Tiago Galletto	17	-	Reserves	Summer	Tenfield
DF	(Uruguay)	Santiago Brunelli	22	Plaza Colonia	Free Agent	Summer	Tenfield

==== Out ====
Position	Nationality	Name	Age	To	Fee	Transfer Window	Ref.
FW	(Uruguay)	Luis Urruti	27	(Peru) Universitario	Loan	Summer	La Red 21
FW	(Uruguay)	Gabriel Leyes	29	Cerro Largo	Free Agent	Summer	Tenfield
DF	(Uruguay)	Emanuel Hernández	22	(Colombia) Jaguares de Córdoba	Free Agent	Summer	Caracol TV
MF	(Uruguay)	Joaquín Piqueréz	21	Peñarol	Free Agent	Summer	Ecos
DF	(Uruguay)	Agustín Ale	24	(Ecuador) Delfín	Loan	Summer	infocancha
DF	(Uruguay)	Joaquín Fernández	21	(Netherlands) SC Heerenveen	Transfer	Summer	Ovación

=== Winter 2020 ===
==== In ====
Position	Nationality	Name	Age	From	Fee	Transfer Window	Ref.
MF	(Uruguay)	Facundo Bonifazi	24	(Netherlands) MVV Maastricht	Free agent	Winter	Tenfield

==== Out ====
Position	Nationality	Name	Age	To	Fee	Transfer Window	Ref.
FW	(Uruguay)	Mauro Da Luz	26	(Ecuador) 9 de Octubre	Loan	Winter	El Telegrafo
GK	(Uruguay)	Gastón Olveira	27	(Paraguay) Olimpia	Loan	Winter	El País

== Squad ==
=== First team squad ===
As of Mar 31, 2021

Note: Flags indicate national team as defined under FIFA eligibility rules; some limited exceptions apply. Players may hold more than one non-FIFA nationality.

No.	Pos.	Nation	Player
2	DF	URU	Guzmán Rodríguez
3	DF	URU	Tiago Galletto
4	DF	URU	Horacio Salaberry
5	MF	URU	Facundo Ospitaleche
6	DF	URU	Facundo Silvera
7	DF	URU	Nicolás Rodríguez
8	MF	URU	Maximiliano Calzada
9	FW	URU	Matías Arezo
10	MF	URU	Diego Vicente
10	MF	URU	Facundo Boné
11	FW	URU	Nicolás González
12	GK	URU	Lucas Machado
13	DF	URU	Gonzalo Viera
14	DF	URU	Marcos Montiel
15	MF	URU	Juan Pablo Plada

No.	Pos.	Nation	Player
17	MF	URU	Ribair Rodríguez
18	FW	URU	Thiago Borbas
19	FW	URU	Juan Manuel Olivera
20	MF	URU	Sebastián Píriz
21	MF	URU	Facundo Bonifazi
22	DF	URU	Claudio Herrera
23	FW	URU	Matías Alonso
24	DF	URU	Santiago Brunelli
25	GK	URU	Fabrizio Correa
26	DF	URU	Santiago Pérez
27	MF	URU	Juan Ignacio Quintana
28	MF	URU	José Neris
30	MF	URU	Adrián Leites
31	FW	URU	Agustín Morales

=== Top scorers ===
Last updated on Mar 31, 2021

Rank	Pos.	No.	Name	Primera División	Copa Sudamericana	Total
1	FW	9	(Uruguay) Matías Arezo	13	2	15
2	MF	28	(Uruguay) José Neris	7	1	8
3	FW	11	(Uruguay) Nicolás González	5	0	5
4	MF	20	(Uruguay) Sebastián Píriz	2	2	4
4	FW	23	(Uruguay) Matías Alonso	4	0	4
5	MF	7	(Uruguay) Nicolás Rodríguez	3	0	3
5	DF	13	(Uruguay) Gonzalo Viera	3	0	3
5	MF	14	(Uruguay) Marcos Montiel	3	0	3
5	FW	27	(Uruguay) Thiago Borbas	3	0	3
5	MF	30	(Uruguay) Adrián Leites	3	0	3
6	DF	17	(Uruguay) Ribair Rodríguez	2	0	2
6	FW	19	(Uruguay) Juan Manuel Olivera	0	2	2
7	DF	4	(Uruguay) Horacio Salaberry	0	1	1
7	DF	6	(Uruguay) Facundo Silvera	1	0	1
7	MF	8	(Uruguay) Maximiliano Calzada	1	0	1
7	MF	31	(Uruguay) Facundo Bonifazi	0	1	1
-	Own goals	-	-	0	0	0
Total				50	9	59

=== Disciplinary record ===
Last updated on Mar 31, 2021

No.	Pos	Nat	Name	Primera División			Copa Sudamericana			Total		
No.	Pos	Nat	Name	Yellow card	(yellow card) (yellow-red card)	Red card	Yellow card	(yellow card) (yellow-red card)	Red card	Yellow card	(yellow card) (yellow-red card)	Red card
Goalkeepers
12	GK	(Uruguay)	Lucas Machado	1	0	0	0	0	0	1	0	0
25	FW	(Uruguay)	Fabrizio Correa	0	0	0	0	0	0	0	0	0
Defenders
2	DF	(Uruguay)	Guzmán Rodríguez	7	1	0	1	0	0	8	1	0
3	DF	(Uruguay)	Tiago Galletto	5	0	0	0	0	0	5	0	0
4	DF	(Uruguay)	Horacio Salaberry	14	0	0	2	0	0	16	0	0
6	DF	(Uruguay)	Facundo Silvera	2	0	0	0	0	0	2	0	0
13	DF	(Uruguay)	Gonzalo Viera	10	1	0	1	0	0	11	1	0
14	DF	(Uruguay)	Marcos Montiel	4	0	1	1	0	0	5	0	1
22	DF	(Uruguay)	Claudio Herrera	1	0	0	0	0	0	1	0	0
24	DF	(Uruguay)	Santiago Brunelli	1	0	0	0	0	0	1	0	0
26	DF	(Uruguay)	Santiago Pérez	4	0	0	0	0	0	4	0	0
Midfielders
MF
5	MF	(Uruguay)	Facundo Ospitaleche	13	0	0	1	0	0	14	0	0
7	MF	(Uruguay)	Nicolás Rodríguez	2	0	0	0	0	0	2	0	0
8	MF	(Uruguay)	Maximiliano Calzada	5	0	0	1	0	0	6	0	0
10	MF	(Uruguay)	Diego Vicente	2	0	1	0	0	0	2	0	1
10	MF	(Uruguay)	Facundo Boné	1	0	0	0	0	0	1	0	0
15	MF	(Uruguay)	Juan Pablo Plada	2	0	0	0	0	0	2	0	0
17	MF	(Uruguay)	Ribair Rodríguez	6	0	0	2	0	0	8	0	0
20	MF	(Uruguay)	Sebastián Píriz	8	2	0	0	1	0	9	3	0
21	MF	(Uruguay)	Facundo Bonifazi	6	0	0	2	0	0	8	0	0
27	MF	(Uruguay)	Juan Ignacio Quintana	1	0	0	0	0	0	1	0	0
30	MF	(Uruguay)	Adrián Leites	2	0	0	0	0	0	2	0	0
Forwards
9	FW	(Uruguay)	Matías Arezo	6	0	0	0	0	0	6	0	0
11	FW	(Uruguay)	Nicolás González	2	0	0	1	0	0	3	0	0
18	FW	(Uruguay)	Thiago Borbas	1	0	0	1	0	0	2	0	0
19	FW	(Uruguay)	Juan Manuel Olivera	5	0	0	0	0	0	5	0	0
23	FW	(Uruguay)	Matías Alonso	2	0	0	1	0	0	3	0	0
28	MF	(Uruguay)	José Neris	2	0	0	0	0	0	2	0	0
31	FW	(Uruguay)	Agustín Morales	0	0	0	0	0	0	0	0	0
Players transferred out during the season
1	GK	(Uruguay)	Gastón Olveira	4	0	0	0	0	0	4	0	0
16	FW	(Uruguay)	Mauro Da Luz	0	0	0	0	0	0	0	0	0
24	DF	(Uruguay)	Joaquín Fernández	2	0	0	0	0	0	2	0	0
Total				120	4	2	14	1	0	134	5	2

== Primera División ==
=== Apertura 2020 ===
==== League table ====
Pos	Team	Pld	W	D	L	GF	GA	GD	Pts	Qualification
1	Nacional	15	7	7	1	27	16	+11	28	Qualification for Torneo Apertura decider
2	Rentistas	15	7	7	1	26	15	+11	28	Qualification for Torneo Apertura decider
3	Montevideo City Torque	15	7	4	4	21	16	+5	25	
4	Peñarol	15	6	6	3	19	15	+4	24	
5	Cerro Largo	15	6	6	3	19	17	+2	24	
6	Defensor Sporting	15	5	6	4	16	20	−4	21	
7	Montevideo Wanderers	15	5	5	5	16	16	0	20	
8	Deportivo Maldonado	15	5	5	5	16	20	−4	20	
9	Liverpool	15	5	4	6	22	25	−3	19	
10	Fénix	15	3	9	3	19	17	+2	18	
11	Progreso	15	4	4	7	21	20	+1	16	
12	River Plate	15	3	6	6	17	18	−1	15	
13	Plaza Colonia	15	3	6	6	14	18	−4	15	
14	Danubio	15	3	5	7	12	17	−5	14	
15	Cerro	15	3	5	7	13	21	−8	14	
16	Boston River	15	2	7	6	14	21	−7	13	

Source: AUF, Soccerway
Rules for classification: 1) Points, 2) Playoff game, in case two teams are tied for first place.
If there are more than two teams tied in points: 2) Goal difference, 3) Goals for, 4) Head-to-head record, 5) Drawing of lots, 6) Playoff game, in case two teams are still tied for first place.

==== Results by round ====
Round	1	2	3	4	5	6	7	8	9	10	11	12	13	14	15
Ground	H	A	H	A	H	A	H	A	A	A	H	H	A	H	A
Result	D	D	D	W	L	D	L	L	L	W	D	L	L	D	W
Position	8	10	10	5	8	9	13	13	15	11	12	13	16	16	12

Source: AUF, Soccerway
A = Away; H = Home; W = Win; D = Draw; L = Loss

==== Matches ====
Win Draw Loss Postponed

Feb 16, 2020 1	River Plate	2-2	Fénix	Montevideo
17:00 UTC−3	Neris 23' 55'; Ospitaleche (yellow card) 41'; G. Rodríguez (yellow card) 67'; Viera (yellow card) 78'; Salaberry (yellow card) 81'; Píriz (yellow card) 90+5'	Report	Canobbio 18'; Pereira 42'; Ugarte (yellow card) 60' (yellow-red card) 89'; Alfaro (red card) 63'	Stadium: Saroldi; Referee: Esteban Ostojich

Feb 22, 2020 2	Cerro	0-0	River Plate	Montevideo
17:00 UTC−3	Paiva (yellow card) 30'; García (yellow card) 65'; M. González (red card) 86'	Report	Ospitaleche (yellow card) 67'; G. Rodríguez (yellow card) 77'; Herrera (yellow card) 82'; Fernández (yellow card) 85'	Stadium: Tróccoli; Referee: Nicolás Vignolo

Mar 8, 2020 3	River Plate	1-1	Defensor Sporting	Montevideo
17:00 UTC−3	Píriz 90+4'; Fernández (yellow card) 16'; Salaberry (yellow card) 37'; Viera (yellow card) 76'	Report	Laquintana 90+3'; Zeballos (yellow card) 29'; Álvarez (yellow card) 52'; Boggio (yellow card) 56'	Stadium: Saroldi; Referee: Christian Ferreyra

Aug 8, 2020 41	Danubio	1-3	River Plate	Montevideo
14:30 UTC−3	Viera 49' (o.g.); Siles (yellow card) 24'; Nequecaur (yellow card) 57'	Report	N. Rodríguez 28'; Arezo 68' (yellow card) 52'; Alonso 90+3'	Stadium: Jardines; Referee: Andrés Cunha

1: Fourth round was suspended on March 14th due to Coronavirus outbreak appearances all over the country .

Aug 15, 2020 5	River Plate	2-3	Nacional	Montevideo
15:00 UTC−3	Leites 6'; Viera 21'	Report	Bergessio 12' 45+3' 77'	Stadium: Saroldi; Referee: Leodán González

Aug 19, 2020 6	Boston River	1-1	River Plate	Montevideo
10:15 UTC−3	Rigoleto 75' (yellow card) 75'; Silva (yellow card) 69'	Report	Alonso 35'; Pérez (yellow card) 24'; Salaberry (yellow card) 68'	Stadium: Centenario; Referee: Daniel Rodríguez

Aug 22, 2020 7	River Plate	0-1	Deportivo Maldonado	Montevideo
15:00 UTC−3	Brunelli (yellow card) 48'; N. Rodríguez (yellow card) 50'	Report	Castellanos 53'; Carrera (yellow card) 44'; Lerda (yellow card) 61'; Batista (yellow card) 82'	Stadium: Saroldi; Referee: Christian Ferreyra

Aug 26/Sep 16, 2020 82	Rentistas	2-1	River Plate	Montevideo
15:00 UTC−3	Vega 32'; Pérez 35'; Romero (yellow card) 38'; Malrechaufe (yellow card) 62'	Report	Arezo 30'; Calzada (yellow card) 5'; Píriz (yellow card) 11' (yellow-red card) 78'; G. Rodríguez (yellow card) 27'; Olveira (yellow card) 35'; Salaberry (yellow card) 49'; Alonso (yellow card) 88'	Stadium: Perrone; Referee: Pablo Giménez

2: The match was suspended after 20 minutes due to stormy weather. To be resumed on September 16. .

Aug 30, 2020 9	Cerro Largo	2-1	River Plate	Melo
17:15 UTC−3	Fernández 16'; Dorrego 17'; Cayetano (yellow card) 83'; Bentancur (yellow card) 90+4'	Report	Arezo 38'; Viera (yellow card) 13'; Píriz (yellow card) 17' (yellow-red card) 61'; G. Rodríguez (yellow card) 31' (yellow-red card) 57'; Vicente (yellow card) 73'; Ospitaleche (yellow card) 90'	Stadium: Ubilla; Referee: Daniel Fedorczuk

Sep 5, 2020 10	Wanderers	0-2	River Plate	Montevideo
15:00 UTC−3	Lores (yellow card) 29'; Méndez (yellow card) 84'	Report	Arezo 30' (yellow card) 90+3'; Leites 49'; Calzada (yellow card) 43'; Olivera (yellow card) 59'; Montiel (yellow card) 60'; Ospitaleche (yellow card) 70'; Salaberry (yellow card) 84'	Stadium: Viera; Referee: Andrés Matonte

Sep 9, 2020 11	River Plate	0-0	Peñarol	Montevideo
15:15 UTC−3	Viera (yellow card) 5'; Salaberry (yellow card) 23'; Pérez (yellow card) 59'; Ospitaleche (yellow card) 78'	Report	Abascal (yellow card) 13'; Trindade (yellow card) 16'; C. Rodríguez (yellow card) 86'	Stadium: Saroldi; Referee: Jonathan Fuentes

Sep 13, 2020 12	River Plate	1-2	Liverpool	Montevideo
10:30 UTC−3	R. Rodríguez 67'; Silvera (yellow card) 38'; Viera (yellow card) 58'; Píriz (yellow card) 56'; Olivera (yellow card) 63'; G. Rodríguez (yellow card) 82'	Report	Escobar 1'; Ramírez 71'; Rosso (yellow card) 66'; Lentinelly (yellow card) 77'	Stadium: Saroldi; Referee: Diego Riveiro

Sep 21, 2020 13	MCT	1-0	River Plate	Montevideo
19:45 UTC−3	Cóccaro 32'; Arismendi (yellow card) 52'; Pizzichillo (yellow card) 66'; Scotto (yellow card) 78'	Report	Olveira (yellow card) 30'; Olivera (yellow card) 33'; Plada (yellow card) 57'; Salaberry (yellow card) 80'	Stadium: Charrúa; Referee: Santiago Motta

Oct 06, 2020 14	River Plate	1-1	Plaza Colonia	Montevideo
15:00 UTC−3	González 83'; Ospitaleche (yellow card) 48'	Report	Verdún 72' (yellow card) 31'; Redín (yellow card) 15'; F. Pérez (yellow card) 65'; Graví (yellow card) 90+4'	Stadium: Saroldi; Referee: Federico Modernell

Oct 10, 2020 15	Progreso	1-2	River Plate	Montevideo
12:30 UTC−3	Viega 62'; Platero (yellow card) 27'; Silva (red card) 73'	Report	N. González 45+1'; Borbas 84'; G. Rodríguez (yellow card) 24'	Stadium: Paladino; Referee: Diego Dunajec

=== Intermedio 2020 (Group B) ===
==== League table ====
Pos	Team	Pld	W	D	L	GF	GA	GD	Pts	Qualification
1	Nacional	7	5	0	2	11	6	+5	15	Advance to Torneo Intermedio Final
2	River Plate	7	4	1	2	14	8	+6	13	
3	Peñarol	7	4	0	3	15	9	+6	12	
4	Fénix	7	3	1	3	7	6	+1	10	
5	Danubio	7	2	3	2	5	9	−4	9	
6	Deportivo Maldonado	7	2	2	3	10	15	−5	8	
7	Defensor Sporting	7	1	3	3	5	10	−5	6	
8	Boston River	7	1	2	4	6	10	−4	5	

Source: AUF, Soccerway
Rules for classification: 1) Points, 2) Goal difference, 3) Goals for, 4) Head-to-head record, 5) Drawing of lots, 6) Playoff game, in case two teams are tied for first place.

==== Results by round ====
Round	1	2	3	4	5	6	7
Ground	A	H	A	H	A	H	H
Result	W	W	W	L	L	D	W
Position	2	1	1	2	2	2	2

A = Away; H = Home; W = Win; D = Draw; L = Loss

==== Matches ====
Win Draw Loss Postponed

Oct 17, 2020 1	Peñarol	1-2	River Plate	Ciudad de la Costa
18:00 UTC−3	Britos 66'; Núñez (yellow card) 7' (yellow-red card) 38'	Report	Neris 18' 36'; Vicente (yellow card) 40'; Salaberry (yellow card) 52'; R. Rodríguez (yellow card) 66'	Stadium: CDS; Referee: Yimmy Álvarez

Oct 23, 2020 2	River Plate	4-0	Danubio	Montevideo
16:30 UTC−3	Calzada 14'; Arezo 16' 25'; Silvera 90'; Leites (yellow card) 15'; Bonifazi (yellow card) 44'	Report	Mercado (yellow card) 48'; Pantaleone (yellow card) 63'; Comachi (yellow card) 80'	Stadium: Saroldi; Referee: Antonio García

Nov 9, 2020 3	Boston River	0-3	River Plate	Montevideo
20:15 UTC−3	Neris 53'; Leites 59'; Arezo 63'; Ospitaleche (yellow card) 46'	Report	Tapia (yellow card) 36'; Abreu (yellow card) 53'; Bentancourt (yellow card) 72'	Stadium: Centenario; Referee: Diego Riveiro

Nov 12, 2020 4	River Plate	0-2	Nacional	Montevideo
14:45 UTC−3	Ospitaleche (yellow card) 17'; Leites (yellow card) 37'; Vicente (red card) 39'	Report	Bergessio 52'; S. Rodríguez 90+2'; Martínez (yellow card) 56'	Stadium: Saroldi; Referee: Daniel Rodríguez

Nov 21, 2020 5	Deportivo Maldonado	2-1	River Plate	Maldonado
17:00 UTC−3	Ramos 13'; Batista 54'; N. Olivera (yellow card) 28'; Cantera (yellow card) 28'	[- Report]	Alonso 77'; Salaberry (yellow card) 5'; J. Olivera (yellow card) 28'; N. González	Stadium: Campus; Referee: José Burgos

Nov 29, 2020 6	River Plate	1-1	Defensor Sporting	Montevideo
17:00 UTC−3	Arezo 27'; G. Rodríguez (yellow card) 1'; Olveira (yellow card) 10'; Bonifazi (yellow card) 38'; Píriz (yellow card) 63'; Montiel (yellow card) 84'	Report	A. González 1'; Rojo (yellow card) 26'; Zuculini (yellow card) 58'; Poggi (red card) 65'	Stadium: Saroldi; Referee: Gustavo Tejera

Dic 11, 2020 7	River Plate	3-2	Fénix	Montevideo
17:00 UTC−3	Neris 11'; Arezo 71' (yellow card) 56'; González 83' (yellow card) 43'; Bonifazi (yellow card) 47'; Píriz (yellow card) 53'; Olveira (yellow card) 63'; R. Rodríguez (yellow card) 75'	Report	N. Fernández 51'; Franco 62' (yellow card) 77'; A. Rodríguez (yellow card) 28'; Argachá (yellow card) 85'	Stadium: Saroldi; Referee: Diego Riveiro

=== Clausura 2020 ===
==== League table ====
Pos	Team	Pld	W	D	L	GF	GA	GD	Pts	Qualification
1	Liverpool	15	10	4	1	34	13	+21	34	Qualification for Championship playoff
2	Peñarol	15	8	5	2	20	12	+8	29	
3	Montevideo City Torque	15	7	5	3	30	14	+16	26	
4	Nacional	15	7	5	3	19	16	+3	26	
5	Plaza Colonia	15	7	4	4	28	16	+12	25	
6	Boston River	15	7	1	7	23	26	−3	22	
7	Fénix (Note: River Plate were awarded two points and Fénix were deducted one point due to Fénix fielding the ineligible player Bryan Olivera during the match between both teams.)	15	5	7	3	25	24	+1	21	
8	River Plate	15	5	4	6	19	23	−4	21	
9	Deportivo Maldonado	15	4	6	5	21	27	−6	18	
10	Montevideo Wanderers (Note: Montevideo Wanderers were awarded three points and Progreso were deducted three points due to Progreso fielding an ineligible player during the match between both teams.)	15	3	6	6	22	31	−9	18	
11	Cerro Largo	15	4	4	7	15	17	−2	16	
12	Progreso	15	5	3	7	17	22	−5	15	
13	Danubio	15	4	3	8	17	23	−6	15	
14	Cerro	15	3	5	7	16	21	−5	14	
15	Defensor Sporting	15	2	8	5	15	21	−6	14	
16	Rentistas	15	2	4	9	12	27	−15	10	

Source: AUF, Soccerway
Rules for classification: 1) Points, 2) Playoff game, in case two teams are tied for first place.
If there are more than two teams tied in points: 2) Goal difference, 3) Goals for, 4) Head-to-head record, 5) Drawing of lots, 6) Playoff game, in case two teams are still tied for first place.

==== Results by round ====
Round	1	2	3	4	5	6	7	8	9	10	11	12	13	14	15
Ground	A	H	A	H	A	H	A	H	H	H	A	A	H	A	H
Result	W	L	W	L	L	W	W	D	W	D	L	L	D	L	W
Position	3	9	4	5	10	8	6	6	5	5	5	6	8	10	8

A = Away; H = Home; W = Win; D = Draw; L = Loss

==== Matches ====
Win Draw Loss Postponed

Jan 17, 2021 11	Fénix	1-1 (awd)	River Plate	Montevideo
17:00 UTC−3	Nequecaur 33'; Fernández (yellow card) 50'; B. Olivera (yellow card) 67'; Canobbio (yellow card) 88'	Report	Arezo 35'; Viera (yellow card) 25' (yellow-red card) 45+1'; Bonifazi (yellow card) 82'; Ospitaleche (yellow card) 83'; Silvera (yellow card) 90+1'	Stadium: Capurro; Referee: Jonathan Fuentes

1: River Plate were awarded two points and Fénix were deducted one point due to Fénix fielding the ineligible player Bryan Olivera during the Torneo Clausura match between both teams. .

Jan 20, 2021 2	River Plate	1-2	Cerro	Montevideo
17:00 UTC−3	N. González 27'; Quintana (yellow card) 23'; Arezo (yellow card) 54'; Olivera (yellow card) 89'	Report	Cabrera 45'; Tancredi 55'; M. González (yellow card) 14'	Stadium: Saroldi; Referee: Diego Dunajec

Feb 1, 2021 3	Defensor Sporting	0-2	River Plate	Montevideo
21:30 UTC−3	Rojo (yellow card) 41'; Cardaccio (yellow card) 45'; L. Rodríguez (yellow card) 78'	Report	Montiel 59'; Borbas 90+1'; R. Rodríguez (yellow card) 42'; Ospitaleche (yellow card) 49'; Píriz (yellow card) 61'; Arezo (yellow card) 67'; Viera (yellow card) 74'; Galletto (yellow card) 78'	Stadium: Franzini; Referee: José Burgos

Feb 4, 2021 4	River Plate	0-4	Danubio	Montevideo
10:00 UTC−3	Viera (yellow card) 90+5'	Report	Comachi 2'; Méndez 28'; Paiva 41'; Deorta 90+6'; Labandeira (yellow card) 15'; Fritzler (yellow card) 17'	Stadium: Saroldi; Referee: Gustavo Tejera

Feb 8, 2021 5	Nacional	3-0	River Plate	Montevideo
21:45 UTC−3	G. Rodríguez 16' (o.g.); Bergessio 33' (yellow card) 54'; Neves 56'; Orihuela (yellow card) 76'	Report	Montiel (yellow card) 37'; Bonifazi (yellow card) 77'; Viera (yellow card) 90'	Stadium: GPC; Referee: Andrés Cunha

Feb 11, 2021 6	River Plate	3-1	Boston River	Montevideo
17:00 UTC−3	Montiel 40'; Viera 50' (yellow card) 77'; Borbas 86'; Ospitaleche (yellow card) 48'; Píriz (yellow card) 61'; Salaberry (yellow card) 62'; Galletto (yellow card) 90'	Report	Martinuccio 26'; Gorga (yellow card) 11'; F. Rodríguez (yellow card) 56'	Stadium: Saroldi; Referee: Daniel Fedorczuk (substituted by Antonio García due to an injury).

Feb 14, 2021 7	Deportivo Maldonado	1-2	River Plate	Maldonado
19:15 UTC−3	Nicolini 36'; S. González (yellow card) 70'	Report	Montiel 55'; Arezo 67'; Bonifazi (yellow card) 14'; Neris (yellow card) 62'; N. Rodríguez (yellow card) 80'; Borbas (yellow card) 89'; Alonso (yellow card) 90'	Stadium: Campus; Referee: Claudia Umpiérrez

Feb 17, 2021 8	River Plate	1-1	Rentistas	Montevideo
10:00 UTC−3	Neris 27'; Viera (yellow card) 67'; Salaberry (yellow card) 90+1'	Report	César 14'; Irrazábal (yellow card) 90+2'	Stadium: Saroldi; Referee: Mathías de Armas

Feb 20, 2021 9	River Plate	2-0	Cerro Largo	Montevideo
17:00 UTC−3	Píriz 47'; Arezo 83'; G. Rodríguez (yellow card) 53'; Ospitaleche (yellow card) 55'; Calzada (yellow card) 84'	Report	Lamardo (yellow card) 44'; H. Dorrego (yellow card) 88' (yellow-red card) 90'	Stadium: Saroldi; Referee: Diego Riveiro

Feb 27, 2021 10	River Plate	1-1	Wanderers	Montevideo
17:00 UTC−3	Arezo 84' (yellow card) 72'; Galletto (yellow card) 87'; Ospitaleche (yellow card) 90+1'	Report	Rivero 48'; Morales (yellow card) 72'; Torres (yellow card) 88'	Stadium: Saroldi; Referee: Leodán González

Mar 7, 2021 11	Peñarol	2-0	River Plate	Ciudad de la Costa
20:15 UTC−3	Britos 37' (yellow card) 51'; A. Álvarez 48'; G. González (yellow card) 23'; Acosta (yellow card) 73'; Piquerez (yellow card) 84'	Report	Calzada (yellow card) 63'; Montiel (yellow card) 66'; Salaberry (yellow card) 71'; Plada (yellow card) 90'	Stadium: CDS; Referee: Andrés Cunha

Mar 14, 2021 12	Liverpool	3-2	River Plate	Montevideo
16:30 UTC−3	Dávila 18'; Almeida 42'; Romero 62' (yellow card) 84'; Cándido (yellow card) 70'	Report	N. Rodríguez 3'; R. Rodríguez 53' (yellow card) 50'; Píriz (yellow card) 61'	Stadium: Belvedere; Referee: Daniel Fedorczuk

Mar 20, 2021 13	River Plate	1-1	MCT	Montevideo
16:00 UTC−3	Viera 50'; R. Rodríguez (yellow card) 26'; Boné (yellow card) 60'; Pérez (yellow card) 71'; Neris (yellow card) 84'	Report	Rak 90+4'; Scotto (yellow card) 22' (yellow-red card) 45+2'; Pereyra (yellow card) 45+1'; Arismendi (yellow card) 69'	Stadium: Saroldi; Referee: Andrés Matonte

Mar 26, 2021 14	Plaza Colonia	1-0	River Plate	Colonia del Sacramento
16:00 UTC−3	Quintana 24'; Kidd (yellow card) 55' (yellow-red card) 90+4'	Report	Montiel (red card) 13'; Salaberry (yellow card) 56'; Galletto (yellow card) 90+3'	Stadium: Prandi; Referee: Gustavo Tejera

Mar 29, 2021 15	River Plate	3-2	Progreso	Montevideo
16:00 UTC−3	N. Rodríguez 1'; N. González 45+1'; Alonso 90'; Salaberry (yellow card) 9'; R. Rodríguez (yellow card) 39'; Pérez (yellow card) 74'; Galletto (yellow card) 87'; Machado (yellow card) 90+1'	Report	Fernández 81' (yellow card) 19'; Marta 90+3' (yellow card) 86'; Gallardo (yellow card) 38'; Viega (yellow card) 38'; Andrada (yellow card) 45+1'; Sánchez (yellow card) 89'	Stadium: Saroldi; Referee: Daniel Rodríguez

=== Overall ===
==== League table ====
Pos	Team	Pld	W	D	L	GF	GA	GD	Pts	Qualification
1	Nacional (Q)	37	19	12	6	56	39	+17	69	Qualification for Championship playoff and Copa Libertadores group stage
2	Liverpool (Q)	37	18	11	8	70	50	+20	65	Qualification for Copa Libertadores first stage (Note: Liverpool qualified for the Copa Libertadores first stage by accepting the Uruguay 4 berth offered by the AUF on 8 February 2021.)
3	Peñarol (X)	37	18	11	8	54	34	+20	65	Qualification for Copa Libertadores group stage or Copa Sudamericana first stage (Note: If Rentistas win the semi-final, they will qualify for the Copa Libertadores group stage and Peñarol will qualify for the Copa Sudamericana first stage. Otherwise, Peñarol will qualify for the Copa Libertadores group stage and Rentistas will qualify for the Copa Sudamericana first stage as Torneo Apertura winners.)
4	Montevideo City Torque (Q)	37	17	10	10	64	40	+24	61	Qualification for Copa Sudamericana first stage
5	Montevideo Wanderers (Note: Montevideo Wanderers were awarded three points and Progreso were deducted three points due to Progreso fielding an ineligible player during the Torneo Clausura match between both teams.) (Q)	37	12	13	12	51	55	−4	52	Qualification for Copa Libertadores second stage (Note: Montevideo Wanderers qualified for the Copa Libertadores second stage by accepting the Uruguay 3 berth offered by the AUF on 22 February 2021.)
6	Cerro Largo (Q)	37	12	14	11	42	39	+3	50	Qualification for Copa Sudamericana first stage
7	Fénix (Note: River Plate were awarded two points and Fénix were deducted one point due to Fénix fielding the ineligible player Bryan Olivera during the Torneo Clausura match between both teams.) (Q)	37	11	17	9	51	47	+4	49	Qualification for Copa Sudamericana first stage
8	River Plate	37	12	11	14	50	49	+1	49	
9	Rentistas (X)	37	11	14	12	45	48	−3	47	Qualification for Copa Libertadores group stage or Copa Sudamericana first stage
10	Plaza Colonia	37	11	13	13	50	45	+5	46	
11	Deportivo Maldonado	37	11	13	13	46	61	−15	46	
12	Defensor Sporting	37	8	17	12	36	51	−15	41	
13	Boston River	37	10	10	17	43	57	−14	40	
14	Progreso	37	10	11	16	45	52	−7	38	
15	Danubio	37	9	11	17	34	49	−15	38	
16	Cerro	37	7	12	18	34	55	−21	33	

Source: AUF
Rules for classification: 1) Points, 2) Playoff game, in case two teams are tied for first place.
If there are more than two teams tied in points: 2) Goal difference, 3) Goals for, 4) Head-to-head record, 5) Drawing of lots, 6) Playoff game, in case two teams are still tied for first place.
(Q) Qualified for the phase indicated; (X) Assured of Copa Sudamericana, but may still qualify for Copa Libertadores

== 2020 Copa Sudamericana ==
=== First Stage ===
11 February 2020
17:15 UTC−5

Atlético Grau (Peru)	1-2	River Plate
Ramírez 86'; Ávila (yellow card) 30'; Andía (yellow card) 66'	Report	Olivera 16'; Neris 24'; R. Rodríguez (yellow card) 61'; Calzada (yellow card) 74'; Alonso (yellow card) 90+3'; Viera (yellow card) 90+4'

Estadio Monumental, Lima (Note: Atlético Grau will play their home match at Estadio Monumental, Lima, instead of their regular stadium Estadio Miguel Grau, Piura which is being remodeled.)
Referee: (Chile) Piero Maza

25 February 2020
19:15 UTC−3

River Plate	1-0	(Peru) Atlético Grau
Olivera 15'; Montiel (yellow card) 32'; N. González (yellow card) 89'	Report	Reátegui (yellow card) 31' (yellow-red card) 52'

Parque Alfredo Víctor Viera, Montevideo (Note: River Plate will play their home match at Parque Alfredo Víctor Viera, Montevideo, instead of their regular stadium Parque Federico Omar Saroldi, Montevideo as it does not meet CONMEBOL requirements.)
Referee: (Paraguay) José Méndez

River Plate won 3-1 on aggregate score and advanced to the second stage.

=== Second Stage ===
28 October 2020
19:15 UTC−5

Atlético Nacional (Colombia)	1-1	River Plate
Hernández 34'; Andrade (yellow card) 17'; Perlaza (yellow card) 19'; Mosquera (red card) 45+3'; Quintana (yellow card) 45+5'; González (yellow card) 45+6'	Report	Salaberry 69' (yellow card) 59'; G. Rodríguez (yellow card) 45'; Ospitaleche (yellow card) 66'; Bonifazi (yellow card) 83'; Borbas (yellow card) 90'

Estadio Atanasio Girardot, Medellín
Referee: (Venezuela) Ángel Arteaga

4 November 2020
19:15 UTC−3

River Plate	3-1	(Colombia) Atlético Nacional
Arezo 5' 26'; Píriz 90'; Viera (yellow card) 42'	Report	Duque 34' (yellow card) 45'; Palacios (yellow card) 45+4'; Rovira (yellow card) 47'

Parque Alfredo Víctor Viera, Montevideo
Referee: (Argentina) Andrés Merlos

River Plate won 4-2 on aggregate score and advanced to the Round of 16.

=== Round of 16 ===
26 November 2020
19:15 UTC−3

River Plate	1-2	(Chile) Universidad Católica
Píriz 45+3'; Salaberry (yellow card) 33'	Report	Zampedri 9'; Aued 73'; Puch (yellow card) 45+6'; Lezcano (yellow card) 67'

Parque Alfredo Víctor Viera, Montevideo
Referee: (Paraguay) José Méndez

3 December 2020
21:30 UTC−3

Universidad Católica (Chile)	0–1	River Plate
Buonanotte (yellow card) 40'; Saavedra (yellow card) 51'	Report	Bonifazi 51' (yellow card) 81'; Píriz (yellow card) 21' (yellow-red card) 52'; R. Rodríguez (yellow card) 36'

Estadio San Carlos de Apoquindo, Santiago
Referee: (Venezuela) Alexis Herrera

Tied 2–2 on aggregate, Universidad Católica won on away goals and advanced to the quarter-finals (Match S4).
