= Nicolás Rossi =

Nicolás Rossi may refer to:

- Nicolás Rossi (footballer, born 1998), Uruguayan goalkeeper
- Nicolás Rossi (footballer, born 2002), Uruguayan left-winger
