= Gonzalo Nápoli =

Uruguayan football player (born 2000)

Personal information
- Full name: Gonzalo Nápoli Soria
- Date of birth: 8 May 2000 (age 26)
- Place of birth: Montevideo, Uruguay
- Height: 1.78 m (5 ft 10 in)
- Position: Midfielder

Team information
- Current team: Liverpool
- Number: 8

Senior career*
Years	Team	Apps	(Gls)
2019–2022	Defensor Sporting	42	(2)
2021–2022	→ River Plate (loan)	29	(0)
2022–2023	River Plate	15	(0)
2023	Liverpool Montevideo	39	(4)
2024–	León	15	(0)
2025–	→ Liverpool Montevideo (loan)	27	(0)

International career
2015	Uruguay U15	10	(1)
2016–2017	Uruguay U17	26	(1)
2018	Uruguay U20	4	(0)
- * Club domestic league appearances and goals as of 1 October 2025

Gonzalo Nápoli Soria (born 8 May 2000) is a Uruguayan footballer who plays as a midfielder for Liverpool Montevideo on loan from the Mexican club León.

== Club career ==
=== Defensor Sporting ===
On 24 January 2019, Nápoli made his professional debut against Club Bolívar in 2019 Copa Libertadores.

== Honours ==
Liverpool F.C. (Montevideo)

- 2023 Supercopa Uruguaya
- 2023 Uruguayan Primera División season

Uruguay U20

- South American Games silver medal: 2018
