= Football at the 2018 South American Games =

- Venue: 4
- Dates: 27 May – 5 June
- Nations: 8
- Teams: 8 (men); 6 (women)

Champions
- Men: Chile
- Women: Paraguay

The association football tournament at the 2018 South American Games was held from 27 May to 5 June in Cochabamba, Bolivia.

Men's teams were restricted to under-19 players (born on or after 1 January 1999), while women's teams were restricted to under-20 players (born on or after 1 January 1998).

== Medal summary ==
Event	Gold	Silver	Bronze
Men	Chile	Uruguay	Colombia
Women	Paraguay	Colombia	Ecuador

=== Medal table ===
Rank	Nation	Gold	Silver	Bronze	Total
1	Chile (CHI)	1	0	0	1
1	Paraguay (PAR)	1	0	0	1
3	Colombia (COL)	0	1	1	2
4	Uruguay (URU)	0	1	0	1
5	Ecuador (ECU)	0	0	1	1
Totals (5 entries)		2	2	2	6

== Men's tournament ==
Men's football at the 2018 South American Games
Tournament details
- Host country: Bolivia
- Dates: 28 May – 5 June
- Teams: 8
- Venue(s): Estadio Félix Capriles; Estadio Municipal de Sacaba

Final positions
- Champions: Chile (1st title)
- Runner-up: Uruguay
- Third place: Colombia

Tournament statistics
- Matches played: 16
- Goals scored: 44 (2.75 per match)
- Top scorer(s): (Uruguay) Facundo Batista (Venezuela) Santiago Herrera (3 goals)

=== Group stage ===
All times are local (UTC−04:00)

==== Pool A ====
Pos	Team	Pld	W	D	L	GF	GA	GD	Pts	Qualification
1	Argentina	3	1	2	0	5	3	+2	5	Semifinals
2	Chile	3	1	2	0	5	4	+1	5	Semifinals
3	Venezuela	3	1	0	2	4	4	0	3	
4	Bolivia (H)	3	0	2	1	4	7	−3	2	

Source: Cochabamba2018
Rules for classification: Qualification tiebreakers
(H) Hosts
28 May 2018
15:30

Argentina	2–2	Chile
García 11'; Cañete 44'	Report	Alarcón 30', 50'

Estadio Félix Capriles, Cochabamba
Referee: Gustavo Tejera (Uruguay)
28 May 2018
19:00

Bolivia	1–4	Venezuela
Ferrufino 18'	Report	Herrera 9', 53', 81'; Bonilla 48'

Estadio Félix Capriles, Cochabamba
Referee: Carlos Herrera (Colombia)

30 May 2018
15:30

Argentina	2–0	Venezuela
Bernabei 77'; Cañete 90'	Report

Estadio Félix Capriles, Cochabamba
Referee: Julio Quintana (Paraguay)
30 May 2018
19:00

Bolivia	2–2	Chile
Herrera 40', 52'		Sepúlveda 61'; Guerra 88'

Estadio Félix Capriles, Cochabamba

1 June 2018
15:30

Chile	1–0	Venezuela
Allende 50'	Report

Estadio Félix Capriles, Cochabamba
Referee: Carlos Herrera (Colombia)
1 June 2018
19:00

Bolivia	1–1	Argentina
Barrón 75'	Report	Desio 63'

Estadio Félix Capriles, Cochabamba
Referee: Gustavo Tejera (Uruguay)

==== Pool B ====
Pos	Team	Pld	W	D	L	GF	GA	GD	Pts	Qualification
1	Colombia	3	3	0	0	4	1	+3	9	Semifinals
2	Uruguay	3	1	0	2	6	5	+1	3	Semifinals
3	Ecuador	3	1	0	2	3	4	−1	3	
4	Paraguay	3	1	0	2	3	6	−3	3	

Source: Cochabamba2018
Rules for classification: Qualification tiebreakers
28 May 2018
09:00

Ecuador	0–1	Paraguay
	Report	Romero 44'

Estadio Municipal de Sacaba, Sacaba
28 May 2018
15:30

Colombia	1–0	Uruguay
Sinisterra 20'

Estadio Municipal de Sacaba, Sacaba

30 May 2018
09:00

Ecuador	3–2	Uruguay
Espinoza 48'; Reasco 49'; Plaza 57'	Report	Batista 79'; Boselli 81'

Estadio Municipal de Sacaba, Sacaba
Referee: Luis Yrusta (Bolivia)
30 May 2018
15:30

Colombia	2–1	Paraguay
Correa 8'; Góez 74'	Report	Rolón 48'

Estadio Municipal de Sacaba, Sacaba
Referee: César Deischler (Chile)

1 June 2018
09:00

Paraguay	1–4	Uruguay
Rolón 32' (pen.)		De Los Santos 22'; Sanabria 64'; Batista 77'; Trasante 90+2'

Estadio Municipal de Sacaba, Sacaba
1 June 2018
15:30

Colombia	1–0	Ecuador
Sandoval 38' (pen.)	Report

Estadio Municipal de Sacaba, Sacaba
Referee: Marlon Escalante (Venezuela)

=== Knockout stage ===
==== Bracket ====
Semi-finals
3 June
Argentina	2
Uruguay	3
3 June
Colombia	1 (1)
Chile (p)	1 (3)

Final
5 June
Uruguay	0
Chile (a.e.t.)	1
Third place
5 June
Argentina	0
Colombia	2

==== Semifinals ====
3 June 2018
17:30

Colombia	1–1	Chile
Sandoval 22'	Report, Penalties	Rojas 52'
Penalties
Sinisterra (penalty missed); Palma (penalty missed); Sandoval (penalty missed); Palacios (penalty scored)	1–3	(penalty missed) Uribe; (penalty missed) Saavedra; (penalty scored) Leiva; (penalty scored) Méndez; (penalty scored) Allende

Estadio Félix Capriles, Cochabamba
Referee: Luis Yrusta (Bolivia)
3 June 2018
21:00

Argentina	2–3	Uruguay
Salomón; Barreal 33'	Report	Trasante 17'; Batista 76'; Boggio 81'

Estadio Félix Capriles, Cochabamba
Referee: Roberto Sánchez (Ecuador)

==== Third place match ====
5 June 2018
17:30

Argentina	0–2	Colombia
	Report	Enamorado 39'; Sinisterra 60'

Estadio Félix Capriles, Cochabamba
Referee: César Deischler (Chile)

==== Final ====
5 June 2018
21:00

Uruguay	0–1 (a.e.t.)	Chile
	Report	Valencia 115'

Estadio Félix Capriles, Cochabamba
Referee: Julio Quintana (Paraguay)

== Women's tournament ==
Women's football at the 2018 South American Games
Tournament details
- Host country: Bolivia
- Dates: 27 May – 4 June
- Teams: 6

Final positions
- Champions: Paraguay (1st title)
- Runner-up: Colombia
- Third place: Ecuador

Tournament statistics
- Matches played: 15
- Goals scored: 39 (2.6 per match)
- Top scorer(s): (Paraguay) Jessica Martínez (Argentina) Yamila Rodríguez (5 goals)

Pos	Team	Pld	W	D	L	GF	GA	GD	Pts
1st place, gold medalist(s)	Paraguay	5	4	1	0	13	3	+10	13
2nd place, silver medalist(s)	Colombia	5	3	2	0	6	2	+4	11
3rd place, bronze medalist(s)	Ecuador	5	1	3	1	3	4	−1	6
4	Chile	5	1	2	2	7	9	−2	5
5	Argentina	5	1	1	3	9	8	+1	4
6	Bolivia (H)	5	0	1	4	1	13	−12	1

Source: Cochabamba2018
Rules for classification: Qualification tiebreakers
(H) Hosts

All times are local (UTC−04:00).

27 May 2018
15:30

Colombia	1–0	Chile
Pérez 9'	Report

CEFED Villa Tunari, Villa Tunari
Referee: Estela Álvarez (Argentina)
27 May 2018
15:30

Paraguay	2–0	Ecuador
Villasanti 45+1'; Chamorro 57'	Report

Estadio Municipal de Shinaota, Shinahota
Referee: Paola Barría (Chile)
27 May 2018
20:30

Bolivia	0–5	Argentina
	Report	Rodríguez 24', 26', 61'; Correa 79', 86'

CEFED Villa Tunari, Villa Tunari
Referee: Melany Bermejo (Peru)

29 May 2018
15:30

Argentina	0–1	Colombia
	Report	Castañeda 78'

Estadio Municipal de Shinaota, Shinahota
29 May 2018
18:00

Chile	1–5	Paraguay
Alarcón 53'	Report	Chamorro 22', 24'; J. Martínez 38', 59'; Villasanti 61'

CEFED Villa Tunari, Villa Tunari
Referee: Johana Haro (Ecuador)
29 May 2018
20:30

Bolivia	0–0	Ecuador
	Report

CEFED Villa Tunari, Villa Tunari
Referee: Jenny Arias (Colombia)

31 May 2018
15:30

Paraguay	1–1	Colombia
J. Martínez 73'	Report	Castañeda 11'

Estadio Municipal de Shinaota, Shinahota
Referee: Estela Álvarez (Argentina)
31 May 2018
18:00

Argentina	1–2	Ecuador
Rodríguez 58'	Report	Peralta 29'; Flores 87'

CEFED Villa Tunari, Villa Tunari
Referee: Adriana Farfán (Bolivia)
31 May 2018
20:30

Bolivia	0–3	Chile
	Report	Grez 11', 90+3'; Alfaro 40'

CEFED Villa Tunari, Villa Tunari
Referee: Angelina Rodas (Paraguay)

2 June 2018
15:30

Argentina	2–2	Chile
Berardo 4'; Narváez 61'	Report	Julio 85'; Díaz 90+2'

Estadio Municipal de Shinaota, Shinahota
Referee: Eryelitz Escalona (Venezuela)
2 June 2018
18:00

Colombia	0–0	Ecuador
	Report

CEFED Villa Tunari, Villa Tunari
Referee: Paola Barría (Chile)
2 June 2018
20:30

Bolivia	0–2	Paraguay
	Report	J. Martínez 24'; Godoy 58'

CEFED Villa Tunari, Villa Tunari
Referee: Jenny Arias (Colombia)

4 June 2018
15:30

Chile	1–1	Ecuador
Grez 86'	Report	Arreaga 76'

Estadio Municipal de Shinaota, Shinahota
Referee: Angelina Rodas (Paraguay)
4 June 2018
18:00

Paraguay	3–1	Argentina
Ávila 12'; Chamorro 24'; J. Martínez 89'	Report	Rodríguez 35'

CEFED Villa Tunari, Villa Tunari
Referee: Adriana Farfán (Bolivia)
4 June 2018
20:30

Bolivia	1–3	Colombia
Flores 22'	Report	Valenzuela 21', 51'; Castañeda 40'

CEFED Villa Tunari, Villa Tunari
Referee: Melany Bermejo (Peru)
