= Ariel Uribe =

Chilean footballer (born 1999)

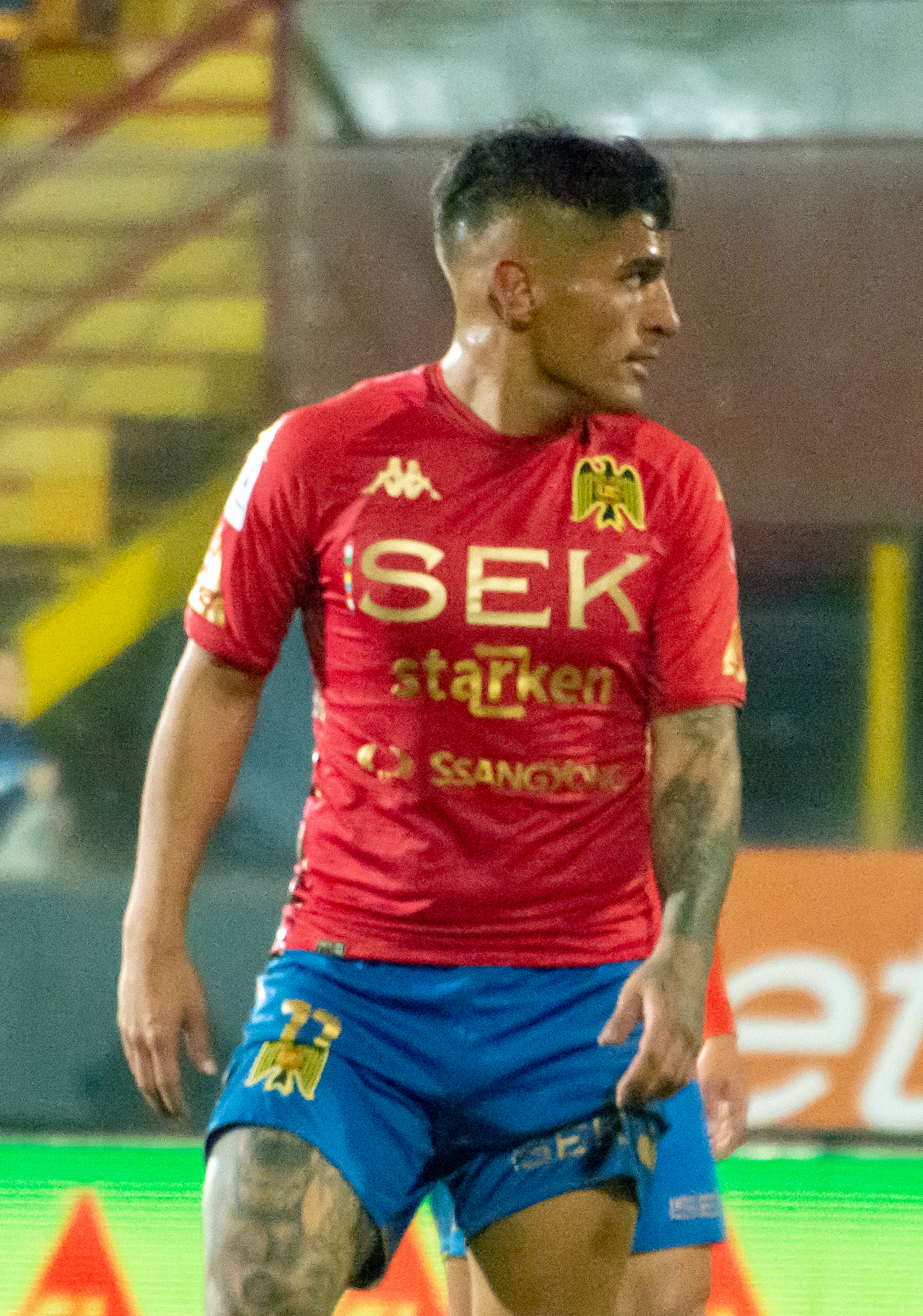
- Uribe with Unión Española in 2023

Personal information
- Full name: Ariel Alfonso Uribe Lepe
- Date of birth: 14 February 1999 (age 27)
- Place of birth: Valparaíso, Chile
- Height: 1.75 m (5 ft 9 in)
- Positions: Attacking midfielder; winger

Team information
- Current team: Audax Italiano (on loan from Unión Española)
- Number: 30

Youth career
- Universidad Católica
- Santiago Wanderers
- 2017–2019: Morelia

Senior career*
Years	Team	Apps	(Gls)
2017	Santiago Wanderers	0	(0)
2017–2020	Morelia	1	(0)
2020	→ Deportes Antofagasta (loan)	7	(1)
2020–2021	Mazatlán	0	(0)
2020–2021	→ Deportes Antofagasta (loan)	49	(4)
2022–2024	Deportes Antofagasta	21	(0)
2023–2024	→ Unión Española (loan)	56	(12)
2025–	Unión Española	24	(1)
2026	→ Universidad de Concepción (loan)	17	(0)
2026–	→ Audax Italiano (loan)	0	(0)

International career^{‡}
2018–2019	Chile U20	1	(0)
2025–	Chile	1	(1)
Medal record
Men's football
Representing Chile
South American Games
Gold medal – first place	2018 Cochabamba
- * Club domestic league appearances and goals as of 14 July 2026 ‡ National team caps and goals as of 18 March 2025

Ariel Alfonso Uribe Lepe (born 14 February 1999) is a Chilean footballer who plays as an attacking midfielder or a winger for Audax Italiano on loan from Unión Española.

== Club career ==
In 2023 and 2024, Uribe played for Unión Española on loan from Deportes Antofagasta. On 4 December 2024, he was transferred to Unión Española on a three-year contract. In January 2026, he moved on loan to Universidad de Concepción and switched to Audax Italiano for the second half of the year.

== International career ==
At under-20 level, Uribe represented Chile in both the 2018 South American Games, winning the gold medal, and the 2019 South American Championship.

Uribe received his first call-up to the Chile senior team for the friendly against Panama on 8 February 2025. He made his debut as a starting player and scored a goal at the minute 5.

== Personal life ==
He is cousin of Mario Lepe, a historical player of Universidad Católica.

== Career statistics ==
=== Club ===
As of 30 December 2019.

Club	Season	League			Cup		Continental		Other		Total	
Club	Season	Division	Apps	Goals	Apps	Goals	Apps	Goals	Apps	Goals	Apps	Goals
Santiago Wanderers	2017	Primera División	0	0	2 (Note: Appearances in the Copa Chile)	0	0	0	0	0	2	0
Monarcas Morelia	2018–19	Liga MX	1	0	0	0	0	0	0	0	1	0
Monarcas Morelia	2019–20	Liga MX	0	0	1 (Note: Appearances in the Copa MX)	0	0	0	0	0	1	0
Monarcas Morelia	Total		1	0	1	0	0	0	0	0	2	0
Antofagasta (loan)	2020	Primera División	7	0	0	0	0	0	0	0	7	0
Total career			8	0	3	0	0	0	0	0	11	0

=== International ===
As of match played 8 February 2025

Appearances and goals by national team and year
National team	Year	Apps	Goals
Chile	2025	1	1
Total		1	1

=== International goals ===
List of international goals scored by Ariel Uribe
No.	Date	Venue	Opponent	Score	Result	Competition
1	8 February 2025	Estadio Nacional Julio Martínez Prádanos, Chile	Panama	2–0	6–1	Friendly

== Honours ==
Chile U20

- South American Games Gold medal: 2018
