= Eugenio Julio =

Chilean footballer

Personal information
- Full name: Eugenio Javier Julio Yáñez
- Date of birth: 21 November 1963 (age 62)
- Place of birth: Coquimbo, Chile
- Position: Forward

Youth career
- Olivar Alto
- Coquimbo Unido

Senior career*
Years	Team	Apps	(Gls)
1982–1988	Coquimbo Unido		
1988	Colo-Colo	7	(1)
1989–1991	Coquimbo Unido		
1992	Santiago Wanderers	–	(–)
1992	Deportes La Serena	11	(3)
1993	Coquimbo Unido	22	(1)
1994–1995	Deportes La Serena	33	(11)
1996–1998	Deportes Antofagasta	49	(7)

Managerial career
- Coquimbo Unido (youth)
- * Club domestic league appearances and goals

Eugenio Javier Julio Yáñez (born 21 November 1963) is a Chilean former football player who played as a forward.

== Career ==
Born in Coquimbo, Chile, Julio was trained at Coquimbo Unido and became the top goalscorer in the club history with 102 goals. He got promotions to the Chilean Primera División in 1983 and 1990 and was a member of the squad that became the runner-up in the 1991 Primera División de Chile.

Despite being a historical player of Coquimbo Unido, Julio also played for Deportes La Serena, the classic rival in the Coquimbo Region in 1992 and 1994–1995.

In 1998, Julio played for Chilean giant Colo-Colo and made appearances at the 1988 Copa Libertadores.

In his homeland, Julio also played for Santiago Wanderers at the 1992 Copa Chile and Deportes Antofagasta from 1996 to 1998, his last club.

== Coaching career ==
Following his retirement, Julio served as coach for the Coquimbo Unido youth ranks for many years.

== Personal life ==
Julio is the uncle of the Chile international footballer María Cristina Julio and the grandfather of the midfielder Nicolás Julio. In addition, his son Patricio, father of Nicolás, works as a fitness coach for Coquimbo Unido.
