= María Cristina Julio =

Chilean footballer (born 1999)

Personal information
- Full name: María Cristina Julio Saldívar
- Date of birth: 17 November 1999 (age 26)
- Place of birth: Coquimbo, Chile
- Height: 1.64 m (5 ft 4 1/2 in)
- Position: Midfielder

Team information
- Current team: Universidad Católica

Youth career
- Deportes La Serena

Senior career*
Years	Team	Apps	(Gls)
2017–2019	Deportes La Serena		
2020	Colo-Colo		
2021–2021	Deportes La Serena		
2022	Santiago Morning		
2023–2025	Coquimbo Unido	19+	(1+)
2026–	Universidad Católica		

International career
2013–2016	Chile U17		
2015–2018	Chile U20		
2017–	Chile	8	(0)
- * Club domestic league appearances and goals

María Cristina Julio Saldívar (born 17 November 1999) is a Chilean footballer who plays as a midfielder for Universidad Católica.

== Career ==
Born in Coquimbo, Julio began her career with Deportes La Serena.

In 2022, she played for Santiago Morning.

She switched to her hometown's club, Coquimbo Unido, for the 2023 season, becoming the second player to sign a professional contract with the club after Natsumy Millones.

In December 2025, Julio signed with Universidad Católica.

== International career ==
At under-20 level, she was part of the Chile squad at the 2018 South American Games.

== Personal life ==
She is the niece of the former professional footballer Eugenio Julio, a historical player of Coquimbo Unido.
