= Lucas Morales =

Uruguayan football player (born 1994)

Personal information
- Full name: Lucas Elías Morales Villalba
- Date of birth: 14 February 1994 (age 32)
- Place of birth: Montevideo, Uruguay
- Height: 1.80 m (5 ft 11 in)
- Position: Left-back

Team information
- Current team: Potencia

Senior career*
Years	Team	Apps	(Gls)
2013–2016	Defensor Sporting	26	(1)
2016–2022	Montevideo Wanderers	83	(2)
2021	→ Rentistas (loan)	18	(0)
2022	Montevideo City Torque	24	(1)
2023–	Potencia		
- * Club domestic league appearances and goals as of 19:25, 21 August 2023 (UTC)

Lucas Elías Morales Villalba (born 14 February 1994) is a Uruguayan footballer who plays as a defender for Potencia in the Uruguayan Segunda División.

== Career statistics ==
=== Club ===
As of match played 17 October 2022

Appearances and goals by club, season and competition
Club	Season	League			Continental		Other		Total	
Club	Season	Division	Apps	Goals	Apps	Goals	Apps	Goals	Apps	Goals
Defensor Sporting	2012–13	Uruguayan Primera División	0	0	—		—		0	0
Defensor Sporting	2013–14	Uruguayan Primera División	11	0	1 (Note: Appearance(s) in Copa Libertadores)	0	—		12	0
Defensor Sporting	2014–15	Uruguayan Primera División	15	1	—		—		15	1
Defensor Sporting	2015–16	Uruguayan Primera División	0	0	—		—		0	0
Defensor Sporting	Total		26	1	1	0	—		27	1
Montevideo Wanderers	2015–16	Uruguayan Primera División	1	0	—		—		1	0
Montevideo Wanderers	2016	Uruguayan Primera División	2	0	1 (Note: Appearance(s) in Copa Sudamericana)	0	—		3	0
Montevideo Wanderers	2017	Uruguayan Primera División	13	1	—		—		13	1
Montevideo Wanderers	2018	Uruguayan Primera División	12	0	—		—		12	0
Montevideo Wanderers	2019	Uruguayan Primera División	26	1	5	0	—		31	1
Montevideo Wanderers	2020	Uruguayan Primera División	29	0	—		1 (Note: Appearance in Torneo Intermedio Final)	0	30	0
Montevideo Wanderers	Total		83	2	6	0	1	0	90	2
Rentistas (loan)	2021	Uruguayan Primera División	18	0	6	0	—		24	0
Montevideo City Torque	2022	Uruguayan Primera División	24	1	1	0	—		25	1
Career total			151	4	14	0	1	0	166	4
