= Hugo Dorrego =

Uruguayan footballer (born 1993)

Personal information
- Full name: Víctor Hugo Dorrego Coito
- Date of birth: 9 May 1993 (age 33)
- Place of birth: Montevideo, Uruguay
- Height: 1.74 m (5 ft 9 in)
- Position: Midfielder

Team information
- Current team: Sportivo Luqueño
- Number: 13

Youth career
- Nacional

Senior career*
Years	Team	Apps	(Gls)
2013–2015	Nacional	8	(0)
2014	→ Rentistas (loan)	8	(0)
2015–2016	Deportivo Maldonado	14	(0)
2016–2021	Cerro Largo	66	(17)
2018	→ Rampla Juniors (loan)	21	(1)
2021–2022	Oriente Petrolero	63	(16)
2023	Guaraní	18	(1)
2023–2024	Oriente Petrolero	43	(7)
2025	Once Caldas	9	(0)
2025–	Sportivo Luqueño	2	(0)

International career
2013	Uruguay U-20		
- * Club domestic league appearances and goals as of 13 August 2025

Víctor Hugo Dorrego Coito (born 9 May 1993) is an Uruguayan footballer who plays as a midfielder for Sportivo Luqueño.
