= 2012–13 Defensor Sporting Club season =

Defensor Sporting
2012–13 season
- President: (Uruguay) Dante Prato
- Head coach: (Uruguay) Tabaré Silva
- Stadium: Estadio Luis Franzini
- Uruguayan Primera División: N/A
- 2013 Copa Libertadores: Entering into First stage
- Top goalscorer: League: N/A; All: N/A
- Highest home attendance: N/A
- Lowest home attendance: N/A
- Average home league attendance: N/A
Home colours	Away colours

Defensor Sporting will take part of the 2012–13 season in the Uruguayan Primera División. They will also take part in the Copa Libertadores.

== Preseason and friendlies ==
11 August 2012 Friendly match	Defensor Sporting (Uruguay)	0 – 1	Racing (Uruguay)	Complejo Eduardo Arzuaga, Montevideo
11:00		Report	Quiñones

== Transfer Window ==
=== In ===
Date	No.	Pos.	Nat.	Name	Age	Moving From	Transfer fee	Type of Transfer	Transfer Window	Source
30 June 2012	-	FW	(Uruguay)	Sasha Aneff	21	(Uruguay) Racing	Free	Loan return	Winter	cambiodefrente.com
9 July 2012	-	MF	(Uruguay)	Aníbal Hernández	26	(Uruguay) Racing	N/A	Transfer	Winter	futbol.com.uy
25 July 2012	-	FW	(Uruguay)	Federico Puppo	25	(United States) Chicago Fire	Free	Loan	Winter	chicago-fire.com

Total Spending: ▼€ 0M

=== Out ===
Date	No.	Pos.	Nat.	Name	Age	Moving To	Transfer fee	Type of Transfer	Transfer Window	Source
30 June 2012	11	MF	(Uruguay)	Nicolás Olivera	34	(Mexico) Correcaminos	Free	Permanent transfer	Winter	subrayado.com.uy
30 June 2012	?	MF	(Uruguay)	Pablo Caballero	34	(Uruguay) Cerro	Free	Permanent transfer	Winter	
30 June 2012	9	FW	(Uruguay)	Matías Britos	23	(Mexico) León	N/A	Permanent transfer	Winter	record.com.mx
6 July 2012	6	DF	(Argentina)	Néstor Emanuel Moiraghi	27	(Argentina) Olimpo	Free	Permanent transfer	Winter	quenonino.com.uy
6 July 2012	10	MF	(Uruguay)	Brahian Alemán	22	(Argentina) Unión	$ 500K	Permanent transfer	Winter	quenonino.com.uy

Total Income: ▲$ 500K

Net Income: ▲$ 500K

== Squad ==
=== First Team ===
TBA

=== Out On Loan ===
TBA

=== Top scorers ===
TBA

=== Top assists ===
TBA

=== Disciplinary record ===
TBA

=== Injuries During The Season ===
Date	Player name	Injury	Estimated Return Date
19 February 2012	(Uruguay) Maximiliano Callorda	Cruciate ligament rupture	September 2012

Last Updated: 15 May 2012

== Competitions ==
=== Overview ===
TBA

== Primera División ==
=== League table ===
TBA
