= Jonathan Toledo =

Uruguayan footballer (born 1996)

Personal information
- Full name: Jonathan Toledo Paragarino
- Date of birth: 10 January 1996 (age 30)
- Place of birth: Montevideo, Uruguay
- Height: 1.83 m (6 ft 0 in)
- Position: Defender

Team information
- Current team: Rampla Juniors
- Number: 2

Youth career
- Defensor Sporting
- Danubio
- River Plate (Montevideo)

Senior career*
Years	Team	Apps	(Gls)
–2018	Albion		
2019–2022	Fénix	49	(0)
2023–	Rampla Juniors	14	(0)
- * Club domestic league appearances and goals as of 14 September 2024

Jonathan Toledo Paragarino (born 10 January 1996) is a Uruguayan footballer who plays as a defender for Rampla Juniors.

== Career ==
After playing for the youth academy of Uruguayan top flight side River Plate (Montevideo), Toledo signed for Albion in the Uruguayan third division.

Before the 2019, season, he signed for Uruguayan top flight club Fénix.
