= Ezequiel Escobar =

Uruguayan footballer (born 1999)

Personal information
- Full name: Ezequiel Alexandre Escobar Luna
- Date of birth: 4 April 1999 (age 27)
- Place of birth: Montevideo, Uruguay
- Height: 1.76 m (5 ft 9 in)
- Positions: Midfielder; forward

Team information
- Current team: Isasa Universitario

Youth career
- Liverpool (Montevideo)

Senior career*
Years	Team	Apps	(Gls)
2017-2020	Liverpool (Montevideo)	22	(2)
2021	Villa Teresa	9	(1)
2022	Liverpool (Montevideo)	4	(0)
2022	Atenas	10	(0)
2023	Cerrito	26	(3)
- * Club domestic league appearances and goals

Ezequiel Alexandre Escobar Luna (born 4 April 1999) is a Uruguayan footballer who plays as a midfielder or forward for Isasa Universitario.

== Career ==
Escobar started his career with Uruguayan side Liverpool (Montevideo), where he has made 19 league appearances and scored 2 goals.
