= Emanuel Mercado =

Argentine footballer (born 1997)

Personal information
- Date of birth: 21 April 1997 (age 29)
- Place of birth: Marcos Juárez, Argentina
- Height: 1.84 m (6 ft 0 in)
- Position: Forward

Team information
- Current team: Atlético Güemes

Youth career
- –2017: Newell's Old Boys
- 2019–2020: Independiente

Senior career*
Years	Team	Apps	(Gls)
2020–2021	Danubio	7	(0)
2021–	Almagro	26	(2)
- * Club domestic league appearances and goals as of 20:02, 7 June 2022 (UTC)

Emanuel Mercado (born 21 April 1997) is an Argentine footballer who plays as a forward for Club Atlético Güemes.

== Career ==
As a youth player, Mercado joined the youth academy of Argentine side Newell's but left due to the death of his parents.

In 2020, he signed for Danubio in Uruguay, where he has made 7 league appearances and scored 0 goals.
