= Guido Verdún =

Paraguayan footballer

Personal information
- Full name: Guido José Verdún Vera
- Date of birth: 19 December 1995 (age 30)
- Place of birth: San Juan Nepomuceno, Paraguay
- Height: 1.80 m (5 ft 11 in)
- Position: Centre-back

Team information
- Current team: Deportivo Santaní
- Number: 6

Senior career*
Years	Team	Apps	(Gls)
2017	Olimpia de Itá		
2018-2019	Fernando de la Mora		
2019	Resistencia S.C.		
2020-2021	Plaza Colonia		
2021	2 de Mayo		
2022	Ciudad Bolívar	4	(0)
2023	Sportivo Carapeguá		
2024	Sportivo San Lorenzo		
2024	Sportivo Carapeguá		
2025-	Deportivo Santaní	22	(0)
- * Club domestic league appearances and goals as of 10:47, 18 January 2026 (UTC)

Guido José Verdún Vera (born 19 December 1995) is a Paraguayan professional footballer who plays as a centre-back for Deportivo Santaní in the Second Division of Paraguay.

== Career ==
In his early career, he played for the Gobernador Rivera Football Team and Atlético Juventud, among others, both teams in the Gobernador Rivera Football League of Paraguay.

In 2017, he played for Olimpia de Itá. Between 2018 and 2019, he played for Fernando de la Mora. In August 2019, he moved to Resistencia S.C. of Paraguay.

Plaza Colonia, signed him in 2020, and he made his debut on October 6, 2020, in a Uruguayan First Division match that ended in a 1–1 draw against River Plate (U), a game he opened with a goal. In 2021, he played for 2 de Mayo.

In March 2022, he joined Ciudad Bolívar.

In July 2023, he arrived at Sportivo Carapeguá. In February 2024, he left for Sportivo San Lorenzo. In July 2024, he returned to Sportivo Carapeguá. In 2025, he signed for Deportivo Santaní, of the Second Division of Paraguay.

== Honours ==
Plaza Colonia

- Torneo Apertura : 2021
