= Jonathan Barboza =

Uruguayan football player (born 1990)

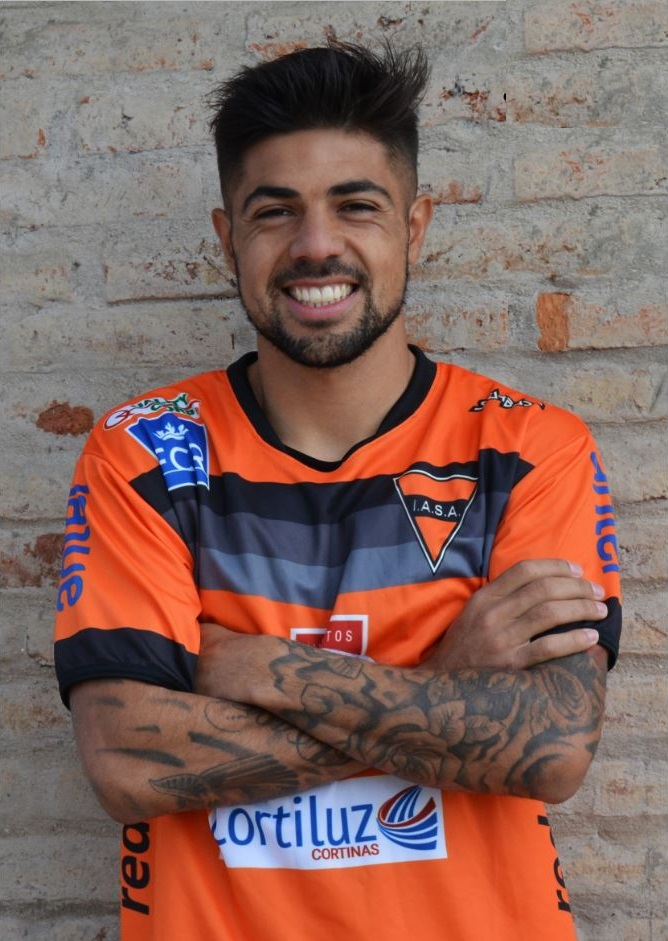
- Barboza with Sud América

Personal information
- Full name: Jonathan Daniel Barboza Bonilla
- Date of birth: 2 November 1990 (age 36)
- Place of birth: Montevideo, Uruguay
- Height: 1.80 m (5 ft 11 in)
- Position: Midfielder

Senior career*
Years	Team	Apps	(Gls)
2010–2015	Liverpool	68	(5)
2010–2011	→ Rentistas (loan)		
2014–2015	→ FC Lugano (loan)	4	(0)
2015	→ Sud América (loan)	6	(0)
2015–2017	Sud América	43	(1)
2017–2019	Cerro	48	(1)
2018–2019	→ Independiente Medellín (loan)	7	(0)
2019–2021	Montevideo Wanderers	79	(6)
2021	Progreso	25	(1)
2022	Irodotos	18	(1)
2022–2023	Sante Fe	22	(3)
2023–2024	River Plate Montevideo	18	(0)
2025–2026	Rampla Juniors	0	(0)
2026–	La Luz	20	(0)
- * Club domestic league appearances and goals as of 19:10, 8 March 2026 (UTC)

Jonathan Daniel Barboza Bonilla (born 2 November 1990) is a Uruguayan professional footballer who plays as a midfielder for Uruguayan Segunda División club La Luz.
