= Joaquín Trasante =

Uruguayan football player (born 1999)

Personal information
- Full name: Joaquín Gabriel Trasante Hernández
- Date of birth: 14 March 1999 (age 27)
- Place of birth: Santa Lucía, Uruguay
- Height: 1.75 m (5 ft 9 in)
- Position: Midfielder

Team information
- Current team: Tristán Suárez

Youth career
- Nacional

Senior career*
Years	Team	Apps	(Gls)
2020–2024	Nacional	49	(1)
2023	→ River Plate Montevideo (loan)	20	(0)
2024–2025	Miramar Misiones	11	(0)
2025–2026	Gimnasia Jujuy	16	(1)
2026–	Tristán Suárez	5	(0)
Medal record
Men's football
Representing Uruguay
South American Games
Silver medal – second place	2018 Cochabamba	Team
- * Club domestic league appearances and goals as of 17:23, 6 May 2026 (UTC)

Joaquín Gabriel Trasante Hernández (born 14 March 1999) is a Uruguayan professional footballer who plays as a midfielder for Primera Nacional club Tristán Suárez.

== Club career ==
A youth academy graduate of Nacional, Trasante was part of club's under-20 team which won 2018 U-20 Copa Libertadores. He made his professional debut on 2 February 2020 in a 4–2 Supercopa Uruguaya defeat against Liverpool Montevideo.

== International career ==
Trasante is a former Uruguay youth international.

== Career statistics ==
As of 24 October 2022

Appearances and goals by club, season and competition
Club	Season	League			Cup		Continental		Other		Total	
Club	Season	Division	Apps	Goals	Apps	Goals	Apps	Goals	Apps	Goals	Apps	Goals
Nacional	2020	Uruguayan Primera División	22	1	—		5 (Note: Appearances in Copa Libertadores.)	0	5 (Note: Two appearances in Championship playoffs and one appearance each in Supercopa Uruguaya, Torneo Apertura decider and Torneo Intermedio final.)	0	32	1
Nacional	2021	Uruguayan Primera División	13	0	—		5 (Note: Four appearances in Copa Libertadores and one appearance in Copa Sudamericana.)	0	1 (Note: Appearance in Supercopa Uruguaya.)	0	19	0
Nacional	2022	Uruguayan Primera División	14	0	0	0	1 (Note: Appearance in Copa Sudamericana.)	0	0	0	15	0
Career total			49	1	0	0	11	0	6	0	66	1

== Honours ==
Nacional U20

- U-20 Copa Libertadores: 2018

Nacional

- Uruguayan Primera División: 2020, 2022
- Supercopa Uruguaya: 2021

Uruguay U20

- South American Games silver medal: 2018
