= Patricio Gregorio =

Uruguayan football player (born 1999)

Personal information
- Full name: Patricio Federico Gregorio Altamiranda
- Date of birth: 28 February 1999 (age 27)
- Place of birth: Montevideo, Uruguay
- Height: 1.88 m (6 ft 2 in)
- Position: Midfielder

Team information
- Current team: Tacuarembó
- Number: 21

Youth career
- Danubio

Senior career*
Years	Team	Apps	(Gls)
2018–2021	Danubio	11	(0)
2020	→ Villa Española (loan)	22	(3)
2021–2022	Nacional	0	(0)
2021	→ River Plate (loan)	4	(0)
2022	→ Racing (loan)	24	(1)
2023	Tombense	0	(0)
2024–	Tacuarembó	15	(1)
- * Club domestic league appearances and goals as of 11 August 2024

Patricio Federico Gregorio Altamiranda (born 28 February 1999) is a Uruguayan professional footballer who plays as a midfielder for Tacuarembó.

== Career ==
A youth academy graduate of Danubio, Gregorio made his professional debut on 30 May 2018 in a 4–1 league win against Rampla Juniors.

== Career statistics ==
=== Club ===
As of 17 May 2021

Club	Season	League			Cup		Continental		Total	
Club	Season	Division	Apps	Goals	Apps	Goals	Apps	Goals	Apps	Goals
Danubio	2018	Uruguayan Primera División	1	0	—		0	0	1	0
Danubio	2019	Uruguayan Primera División	10	0	—		0	0	10	0
Danubio	Total		11	0	0	0	0	0	11	0
Villa Española (loan)	2020	Uruguayan Segunda División	22	3	—		—		22	3
Nacional	2021	Uruguayan Primera División	0	0	—		0	0	0	0
River Plate Montevideo (loan)	2021	Uruguayan Primera División	1	0	—		—		1	0
Career total			34	3	0	0	0	0	34	3
