= Santiago Herrera =

Venezuelan footballer (born 1999)

Personal information
- Full name: Santiago Herrera Yallonardo
- Date of birth: 27 November 1999 (age 26)
- Place of birth: Barquisimeto, Venezuela
- Height: 5 ft 10 in (1.78 m)
- Position: Forward

Team information
- Current team: Manchego

College career
Years	Team	Apps	(Gls)
2017–2018	UCLA Bruins	33	(5)
2019–2021	North Carolina Tar Heels	53	(12)

Senior career*
Years	Team	Apps	(Gls)
2016–2017	ACD Lara	12	(0)
2022	Deportivo La Guaira	26	(5)
2023–2024	Monagas	16	(3)
2024–	Manchego	6	(0)

International career^{‡}
2018–2019	Venezuela U20	10	(2)
- * Club domestic league appearances and goals as of 13 October 2024 ‡ National team caps and goals as of 14:11, 20 October 2019 (UTC)

Santiago Herrera Yallonardo (born 27 November 1999) is a Venezuelan footballer who plays as a forward for Spanish club Manchego.

== Club career ==
Prior to joining Monagas, Herrera played the 2022 season with Deportivo La Guaira F.C. Herrera played collegiately in the United States for the North Carolina Tar Heels of the University of North Carolina at Chapel Hill from 2019-2021. He played for the UCLA Bruins for 2017-18.

Herrera signed with Deportivo La Guaira in February 2022, making his league debut on 24 February 2022. In his first season with the club, Hererra registered five goals in 26 league appearances as Los Naranjas finished the regular season in fifth place in the standings. Herrera appeared in five matches in the Copa Sudamericana tournament, failing to score in 337 minutes of action.

In January 2023, Herrera signed a two-year contract with Monagas. Herrera debuted for Monagas on 4 February 2023 against his former club, Deportivo La Guaira, logging 20 minutes as a substitute in a scoreless draw. On 12 February 2023, Herrera registered his first assist for Monagas in a 3-1 win over Mineros de Guayana, playing just 7 minutes as a late-game substitute. Herrera scored his first goal for Monagas on 25 February 2023, the match winner, in a 1–0 victory against Angostura.

== Career statistics ==
=== Club ===
As of 5 Aug 2023.

Club	Season	League			Cup		Continental		Other		Total	
Club	Season	Division	Apps	Goals	Apps	Goals	Apps	Goals	Apps	Goals	Apps	Goals
ACD Lara	2016	Venezuelan Primera División	9	0	1 (Note: Appearances in the Copa Venezuela)	0	0	0	0	0	10	0
ACD Lara	2017	Venezuelan Primera División	3	0	0	0	–		0	0	3	0
Deportivo La Guaira F.C.	2022	Venezuelan Primera Division	26	5	0	0	5	0	6	0	37	5
Monagas S.C.	2023	Venezuelan Primera División	13	3	0	0	5	0	0	0	18	3
Career total			51	8	1	0	10	0	6	0	68	8
