= Leandro Onetto =

Uruguayan footballer (born 1996)

Personal information
- Full name: Leandro Onetto Baccino
- Date of birth: 12 December 1996 (age 29)
- Place of birth: Fray Bentos, Uruguay
- Height: 1.80 m (5 ft 11 in)
- Positions: Midfielder; winger

Team information
- Current team: Cerro Largo

Youth career
- Defensor Sporting

Senior career*
Years	Team	Apps	(Gls)
2017-2018	Progreso	33	(4)
2019-2020	Danubio	5	(0)
2020	Villa Teresa	8	(0)
2021-	Cerro Largo	0	(0)
- * Club domestic league appearances and goals

Leandro Onetto Baccino (born 12 December 1996) is a Uruguayan footballer who plays as a midfielder or winger for Cerro Largo.

== Career ==
Onetto started his career with Uruguayan second division side Progreso, where he made 33 league appearances and scored 4 goals and was nicknamed "Forlán" due to physically resembling Uruguay international Diego Forlán

Before the 2019 season, Onetto signed for Danubio in the Uruguayan top flight.

In 2020, he signed for Uruguayan second division club Villa Teresa.
