= Pablo García (footballer, born 1999) =

Uruguayan footballer

Personal information
- Full name: Pablo Javier García Lafluf
- Date of birth: 15 April 1999 (age 27)
- Place of birth: Montevideo, Uruguay
- Height: 1.78 m (5 ft 10 in)
- Position: Midfielder

Team information
- Current team: San Martín SJ
- Number: 14

Youth career
- Liverpool

Senior career*
Years	Team	Apps	(Gls)
2016–2017	Liverpool	10	(0)
2018–2019	River Plate B		
2019–2023	Nacional	40	(2)
2021	→ River Plate (loan)	13	(1)
2022	→ Coritiba (loan)	4	(0)
2023–2024	River Plate	28	(0)
2024–2025	Plaza Colonia	51	(7)
2025–	San Martín SJ	3	(0)

International career
- Uruguay U17
2017	Uruguay U18	3	(1)
2016–2019	Uruguay U20	20	(6)
- * Club domestic league appearances and goals as of 16:52, 23 November 2025 (UTC)

Pablo Javier García Lafluf (born 15 April 1999) is a Uruguayan professional footballer who plays as a midfielder for San Martín SJ.

== Career ==
=== Club ===
García began his career in his homeland of Uruguay, Liverpool were his first club. He was an unused substitute for a Uruguayan Primera División fixture with Montevideo Wanderers on 6 February 2016, which preceded his professional debut on 13 February during an away loss versus Plaza Colonia. After ten further appearances in all competitions across three campaigns, García departed at the conclusion of 2017 after rejecting a new contract with Liverpool. In January 2018, García left to join Argentine football by signing for River Plate of the Argentine Primera División. A year later, García returned to Uruguay with 2018 runner-ups Nacional.

=== International ===
García represented Uruguay at U17 and U20 level. He scored for the U17s in a friendly with the United States in June 2017, while he was selected by the U20s for the 2018 Panda Cup. García was picked by Fabián Coito for the 2019 South American U-20 Championship in Chile.

== Career statistics ==
As of 11 January 2019.

Club statistics
Club	Season	League			Cup		Continental		Other		Total	
Club	Season	Division	Apps	Goals	Apps	Goals	Apps	Goals	Apps	Goals	Apps	Goals
Liverpool	2015–16	Uruguayan Primera División	6	0	—		—		0	0	6	0
Liverpool	2016	Uruguayan Primera División	4	0	—		—		0	0	4	0
Liverpool	2017	Uruguayan Primera División	0	0	—		1 (Note: Appearance(s) in the Copa Sudamericana)	0	0	0	1	0
Liverpool	Total		10	0	—		1	0	0	0	11	0
River Plate	2017–18	Argentine Primera División	0	0	0	0	0	0	0	0	0	0
River Plate	2018–19	Argentine Primera División	0	0	0	0	0	0	0	0	0	0
River Plate	Total		0	0	0	0	0	0	0	0	0	0
Nacional	2019	Uruguayan Primera División	0	0	—		0	0	0	0	0	0
Career total			10	0	0	0	1	0	0	0	11	0
