= Facundo Batista =

Uruguayan footballer (born 1999)

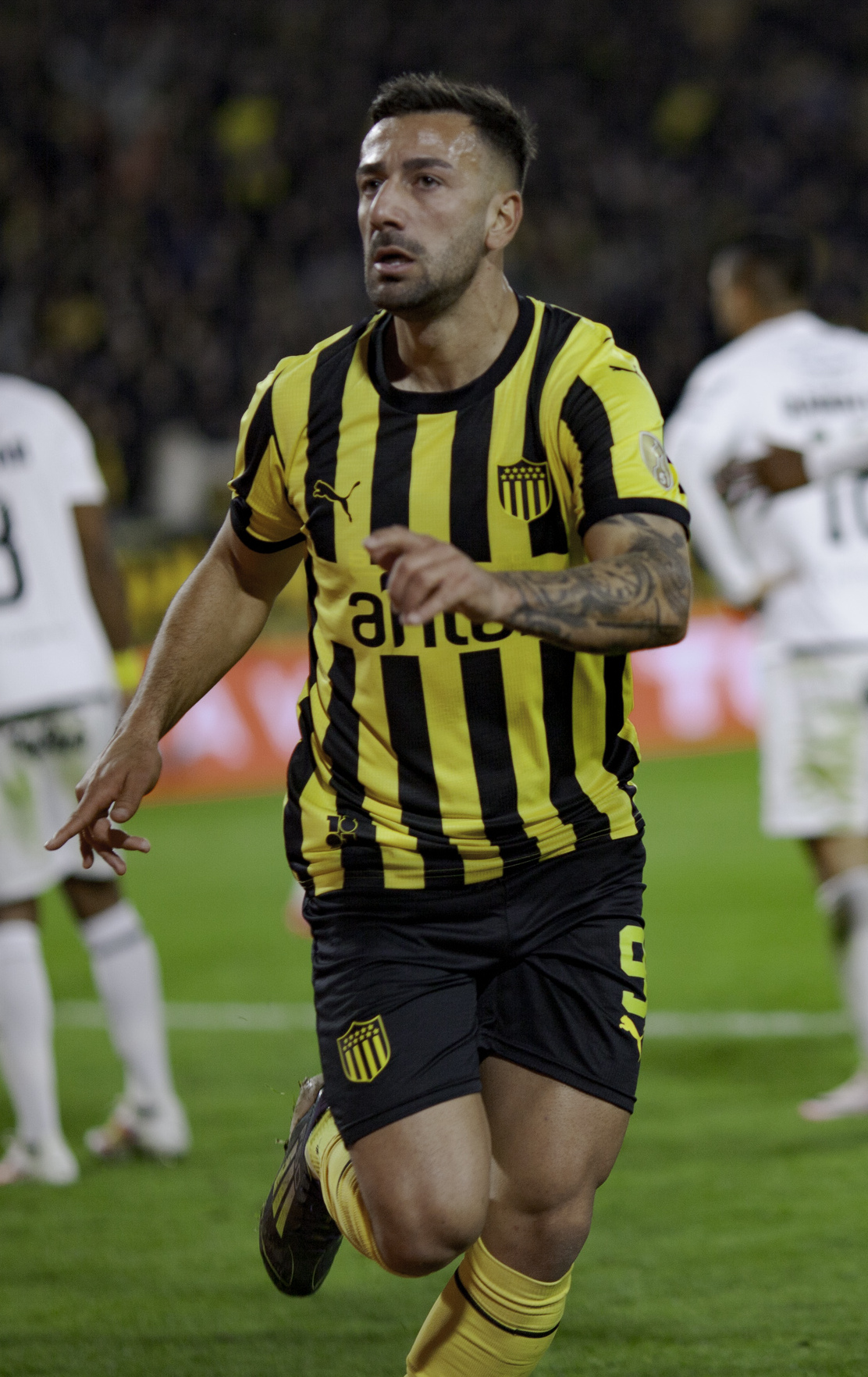
- Batista with Peñarol in 2024

Personal information
- Full name: Facundo Agustín Batista Ochoa
- Date of birth: 16 January 1999 (age 27)
- Place of birth: Montevideo, Uruguay
- Height: 1.82 m (6 ft 0 in)
- Position: Forward

Team information
- Current team: Nacional
- Number: 9

Youth career
- Siete Estrellas
- Danubio
- Defensor Sporting

Senior career*
Years	Team	Apps	(Gls)
2018–2021	Chiasso	9	(2)
2019	→ Ponte Preta (loan)	4	(0)
2019–2020	→ Académico Viseu (loan)	5	(1)
2020–2021	→ Deportivo Maldonado (loan)	40	(16)
2021–2025	Necaxa	62	(14)
2024	→ Querétaro (loan)	18	(2)
2024–2025	→ Peñarol (loan)	17	(8)
2025	Polissya Zhytomyr	13	(6)
2025–2026	Atlético Nacional	19	(4)
2026–	Peñarol	23	(1)

International career
2017	Uruguay U18	9	(6)
2018–2019	Uruguay U20	14	(4)
Medal record
Men's football
Representing Uruguay
South American Games
Silver medal – second place	2018 Cochabamba	Team
- * Club domestic league appearances and goals as of 15 November 2026

Facundo Agustín Batista Ochoa (born 16 January 1999) is a Uruguayan professional footballer who plays as a forward for Liga AUF Uruguaya club Peñarol.

== Club career ==
Batista played baby football for Siete Estrellas before joining Danubio. He left the club following an argument with a coach and joined rivals Defensor Sporting. In August 2018, he joined Swiss second division club Chiasso. He joined Brazilian club Ponte Preta on loan in March 2019.

Batista joined Portuguese club Académico Viseu on loan in August 2019. He played eight matches for the club and scored a goal before terminating his contract in January 2020.

Batista returned to Uruguay in January 2020 by signing for Deportivo Maldonado on a loan deal. He scored 16 goals from 40 matches for the club before terminating his contract on 30 June 2021.

On 17 September 2021, Batista joined Mexican club Necaxa. On 2 July 2024, he joined Peñarol on a loan deal until June 2025.

== International career ==
Batista has represented Uruguay at youth international level. He was part of Uruguay squad that finished third at the 2019 South American U-20 Championship.

== Honours ==
Peñarol

- Uruguayan Primera División: 2024

Uruguay U20

- South American Games silver medal: 2018

Individual

- Uruguayan Primera División Young Player of the Year: 2020
- Uruguayan Primera División Team of the Year: 2020
