= Rodrigo Viega =

Uruguayan footballer (born 1991)

Personal information
- Full name: Rodrigo Pascual Viega Alves
- Date of birth: 7 August 1991 (age 35)
- Place of birth: Rivera, Uruguay
- Height: 1.85 m (6 ft 1 in)
- Position: Right midfielder

Team information
- Current team: Sportivo Luqueño
- Number: 5

Youth career
- Peñarol

Senior career*
Years	Team	Apps	(Gls)
2010–2018	Peñarol	8	(1)
2013–2015	→ Juventud (loan)	52	(6)
2016–2017	→ Temperley (loan)	5	(0)
2017	→ Montevideo Wanderers (loan)	9	(1)
2018	→ El Tanque Sisley (loan)		
2018	→ Progreso (loan)	17	(1)
2018–2020	Progreso	71	(10)
2021	Liverpool	24	(1)
2022	Boston River	29	(2)
2023–	Sportivo Luqueño	8	(0)
- * Club domestic league appearances and goals as of 16:53, 23 October 2023 (UTC)

Rodrigo Pascual Viega Alves (born 7 August 1991) is a Uruguayan footballer who plays as a midfielder for Sportivo Luqueño in the Paraguayan Primera División.
