= José Neris =

Uruguayan footballer (born 2000)

Personal information
- Full name: José Pablo Neris Figueredo
- Date of birth: 13 March 2000 (age 26)
- Place of birth: Montevideo, Uruguay
- Height: 1.83 m (6 ft 0 in)
- Position: Forward

Team information
- Current team: Emelec

Youth career
- River Plate Montevideo

Senior career*
Years	Team	Apps	(Gls)
2017–2023	River Plate Montevideo	77	(10)
2022	→ Albion (loan)	32	(10)
2023–2026	Colón	14	(0)
2023–2024	→ Peñarol (loan)	17	(2)
2025	→ Montevideo City Torque (loan)	34	(16)
2026–	Emelec	1	(0)

International career
2014–2015	Uruguay U15	26	(8)
2016–2017	Uruguay U17	19	(8)
2018	Uruguay U20	9	(2)
- * Club domestic league appearances and goals as of 10 March 2026

José Pablo Neris Figueredo (born 13 March 2000) is a Uruguayan professional footballer who plays as a forward for Ecuadorian Serie A club Emelec.

== Club career ==
Neris is a youth academy graduate of River Plate Montevideo. He scored 11 goals from 84 matches for the club since his debut in August 2017.

In January 2023, Neris joined Argentine Primera División club Colón. In August 2023, he joined Peñarol on a loan deal until the end of the 2024 season.

== International career ==
As a youth international, Neris has represented Uruguay at the 2015 South American U-15 Championship and the 2017 South American U-17 Championship.

In May 2024, Neris was named in the first ever Uruguay A' national team squad.
