= Lucas Machado =

Uruguayan footballer (born 1998)

Personal information
- Full name: Lucas Machado Solari
- Date of birth: 10 April 1998 (age 28)
- Place of birth: San José de Mayo, Uruguay
- Height: 1.84 m (6 ft 0 in)
- Position: Goalkeeper

Team information
- Current team: Rentistas
- Number: 1

Senior career*
Years	Team	Apps	(Gls)
2019–2021	River Plate Montevideo	14	(0)
2022–	Rentistas	35	(0)
- * Club domestic league appearances and goals as of 9 September 2024

Lucas Machado Solari (born 10 April 1998) is a Uruguayan footballer who plays as a goalkeeper for Rentistas in the Uruguayan Segunda División.
