= Gonzalo Viera =

Uruguayan footballer (born 1987)

Personal information
- Full name: Gonzalo Martín Viera Davyt
- Date of birth: 8 February 1987 (age 39)
- Place of birth: Paysandú, Uruguay
- Height: 1.85 m (6 ft 1 in)
- Position: Center-back

Senior career*
Years	Team	Apps	(Gls)
2007–2008	Defensor Sporting		
2008–2011	Miramar Misiones		
2011–2012	Cerro Largo	25	(0)
2012–2013	Cerro Porteño	12	(0)
2013–2015	Peñarol	42	(3)
2015–2019	Al-Rayyan	83	(7)
2019-2021	River Plate	49	(5)
2021-	Atenas	-	(-)
- * Club domestic league appearances and goals as of 10 April 2021

Gonzalo Martín Viera Davyt (Note: In this Spanish name, the first or paternal surname is Viera and the second or maternal family name is Davyt.) (born February 8, 1987, in Paysandú, Uruguay), known as Gonzalo Viera, is a Uruguayan footballer who is playing for Atenas in Uruguayan Segunda División.

== Teams ==
Team	Country	Year
Defensor Sporting	Uruguay	2007 – 2008
Miramar Misiones	Uruguay	2008 – 2011
Cerro Largo	Uruguay	2011-2012
Cerro Porteño	Paraguay	2012 – 2013
Peñarol (cedido)	Uruguay	2013 – 2015
Al-Rayyan	Qatar	2015 - 2019
River Plate	Uruguay	2019 - 2021
Atenas	Uruguay	2021-Act
