= Marcos Montiel =

Uruguayan footballer (born 1995)

Personal information
- Full name: Marcos Daniel Montiel González
- Date of birth: 12 July 1995 (age 31)
- Place of birth: Montevideo, Uruguay
- Height: 1.86 m (6 ft 1 in)
- Position: Center-back

Team information
- Current team: Olimpia
- Number: 14

Senior career*
Years	Team	Apps	(Gls)
2016–2019	Villa Teresa	43	(8)
2019–2023	River Plate Montevideo	84	(7)
2023–2024	Nacional	19	(2)
2024	→ Godoy Cruz (loan)	6	(0)
2024–2025	Deportivo Maldonado	12	(0)
2025–	Olimpia	14	(0)
- * Club domestic league appearances and goals as of 25 May 2025

Marcos Daniel Montiel González (born 12 July 1995) is a Uruguayan footballer who plays as a defensive midfielder for Honduran Liga Nacional club Olimpia.

== Career ==
In January 2023, Montiel joined Nacional, signing alongside Daniel Bocanegra and Fabián Noguera.

In 2025, he joined Honduran club Olimpia as a part of new manager Eduardo Espinel squad.
