= Nicolás Rossi (footballer, born 1998) =

Uruguayan footballer (born 1998)

Personal information
- Full name: Jonathan Nicolás Rossi Acuña
- Date of birth: 16 May 1998 (age 28)
- Place of birth: Montevideo, Uruguay
- Height: 1.89 m (6 ft 2 in)
- Position: Goalkeeper

Team information
- Current team: Club Sportivo 2 de Mayo
- Number: 1

Youth career
- –2015: Rentistas

Senior career*
Years	Team	Apps	(Gls)
2015–2021	Rentistas	43	(0)
2022–2023	Defensor Sporting	37	(0)
2024–	Sportivo Ameliano	20	(0)
	Club Sportivo 2 de Mayo	15	
- * Club domestic league appearances and goals as of Octubre 2026

Jonathan Nicolás Rossi Acuña (born 16 May 1998) is a Uruguayan footballer who plays as a goalkeeper for Club Sportivo 2 de Mayo in the Paraguayan Primera División.

== Career ==
=== Rentistas ===
A graduate of the club's youth academy, Rossi made his league debut for the club on 3 December 2016, playing the entirety of a 1–0 victory over Torque.
