= Ribair Rodríguez =

Uruguayan footballer (born 1987)

Personal information
- Full name: Ribair Rodríguez Pérez
- Date of birth: 4 October 1987 (age 39)
- Place of birth: Montevideo, Uruguay
- Height: 1.85 m (6 ft 1 in)
- Position: Defensive midfielder

Youth career
- Danubio

Senior career*
Years	Team	Apps	(Gls)
2004–2009	Danubio	84	(4)
2010–2011	Tigre	22	(0)
2011–2012	Belgrano	46	(2)
2012–2013	Siena	8	(0)
2013	→ Boca Juniors (loan)	22	(1)
2014–2017	Santos Laguna	18	(2)
2015	→ Nacional (loan)	4	(0)
2015–2017	→ U. de G. (loan)	38	(0)
2017–2018	Danubio	38	(0)
2019–2020	Newell's Old Boys	1	(0)
2020–2021	River Plate	20	(2)
2022–2024	Danubio	24	(0)
- * Club domestic league appearances and goals as of 22:39, 9 May 2019 (UTC)

Ribair Rodríguez Pérez (born 4 October 1987 in Montevideo) is a Uruguayan former footballer.

Rodríguez previously played for Leones Negros in the Ascenso MX.

== Titles ==
- Danubio 2004 (Uruguayan Championship)
- Danubio 2006 (Torneo Apertura)
- Danubio 2007 (Torneo Clausura)
