= Nicolás González (footballer, born 1997) =

Uruguayan footballer

Personal information
- Full name: Daniel Nicolás González Álvarez
- Date of birth: 23 June 1997 (age 29)
- Place of birth: Montevideo, Uruguay
- Height: 1.83 m (6 ft 0 in)
- Position: Forward

Team information
- Current team: Cerro
- Number: 9

Youth career
- Las Flores
- Cerro

Senior career*
Years	Team	Apps	(Gls)
2016–2018	Cerro	39	(9)
2017	→ Progreso (loan)	24	(12)
2019	Defensor Sporting	33	(7)
2020–2021	River Plate	29	(5)
2021	→ Boston River (loan)	12	(2)
2022–	Cerro	50	(19)
- * Club domestic league appearances and goals as of 14 September 2024

Daniel Nicolás González Álvarez (born 23 June 1997) is a Uruguayan professional footballer who plays as a forward for Cerro.

== Career ==
González had youth spells with Las Flores and Cerro. He began his senior career with Cerro in 2016. He made his first appearance on 30 August 2016 in a league win away to Fénix. After seven appearances in 2016 for Cerro, González was loaned out to Uruguayan Segunda División team Progreso for the 2017 campaign. He made his first start for Progreso on 22 April versus Cerro Largo, scoring the first goal in a 2–0 win. In his first twenty games for them, González scored ten times. Overall, he went onto score sixteen goals in thirty-one matches, including four goals during the play-offs as Progreso won promotion. He scored his first goals for Cerro in April 2018 against Racing Club and River Plate.

After a year with Defensor Sporting, González moved to River Plate in January 2020.

== Personal life ==
González's brother-in-law, Federico Puente, is a professional footballer.

== Career statistics ==
As of 6 September 2018.

Club statistics
Club	Season	League			Cup		League Cup		Continental (Note: Includes the Copa Libertadores and Copa Sudamericana)		Other (Note: Includes the Uruguayan Segunda División play-offs)		Total	
Club	Season	Division	Apps	Goals	Apps	Goals	Apps	Goals	Apps	Goals	Apps	Goals	Apps	Goals
Cerro	2016	Primera División	7	0	—		—		—		0	0	7	0
Cerro	2017	Primera División	0	0	—		—		0	0	0	0	0	0
Cerro	2018	Primera División	24	9	—		—		2 (Note: Two appearances in 2018 Copa Sudamericana)	0	0	0	26	9
Cerro	Total		31	9	—		—		2	0	0	0	33	9
Progreso (loan)	2017	Segunda División	24	12	—		—		—		7 (Note: Seven appearances in 2017 Uruguayan Segunda División play-offs)	4 (Note: Four goals in 2017 Uruguayan Segunda División play-offs)	31	16
Career total			55	21	—		—		2	0	7	4	64	25
