= Fabrizio Correa =

Uruguayan football player (born 2001)

Personal information
- Full name: Fabrizio Nicolás Correa González
- Date of birth: 18 January 2001 (age 25)
- Place of birth: Montevideo, Uruguay
- Height: 1.90 m (6 ft 3 in)
- Position: Goalkeeper

Team information
- Current team: River Plate Montevideo
- Number: 25

Youth career
- River Plate Montevideo

Senior career*
Years	Team	Apps	(Gls)
2021–	River Plate Montevideo	47	(0)
2023	→ La Luz (loan)	13	(0)
- * Club domestic league appearances and goals as of 17 May 2025

Fabrizio Nicolás Correa González (born 18 January 2001) is a Uruguayan professional footballer who plays as a goalkeeper for River Plate Montevideo.

== Club career ==
Correa is a youth academy graduate of River Plate Montevideo. He made his professional debut on 1 February 2021 in his club's 2–0 league win against Defensor Sporting.

== International career ==
In January 2024, Correa was named in Uruguay's squad for the 2024 CONMEBOL Pre-Olympic Tournament.

== Career statistics ==
As of 11 February 2023

Appearances and goals by club, season and competition
Club	Season	League			Cup		Continental		Total	
Club	Season	Division	Apps	Goals	Apps	Goals	Apps	Goals	Apps	Goals
River Plate Montevideo	2020	Uruguayan Primera División	2	0	—		0	0	2	0
River Plate Montevideo	2021	Uruguayan Primera División	2	0	—		—		2	0
River Plate Montevideo	2022	Uruguayan Primera División	2	0	1	0	2	0	5	0
River Plate Montevideo	2023	Uruguayan Primera División	2	0	0	0	0	0	2	0
Career total			8	0	1	0	2	0	11	0
