= Tiago Galletto =

Uruguayan footballer (born 2002)

Personal information
- Full name: Tiago Galletto López
- Date of birth: 11 May 2002 (age 24)
- Place of birth: Palma de Mallorca, Spain
- Height: 1.81 m (5 ft 11 in)
- Position: Midfielder

Team information
- Current team: Deportes Limache

Youth career
- 2017–2020: River Plate Montevideo

Senior career*
Years	Team	Apps	(Gls)
2020–2025	River Plate Montevideo	91	(6)
2023	→ Cerro Largo (loan)	32	(1)
2025–2026	AVS	19	(0)
2026–	Deportes Limache	0	(0)
- * Club domestic league appearances and goals as of 18 May 2026

Tiago Galletto López (born 11 May 2002) is a Uruguayan professional footballer who plays as a midfielder for Chilean Primera División club Deportes Limache.

== Career ==
A youth academy graduate of River Plate Montevideo, Galletto made his professional debut on 5 September 2020 in club's 2–0 league win against Montevideo Wanderers.

On 22 January 2025, Galletto signed a three-and-a-half-year contract with AVS in Portugal.

In July 2026, Galletto moved to Chile and signed with Deportes Limache in the Liga de Primera.

== Personal life ==
Galletto was born in Palma de Mallorca, Spain.

== Career statistics ==
=== Club ===
As of 17 May 2021

Club	Season	League			Cup		Continental		Total	
Club	Season	Division	Apps	Goals	Apps	Goals	Apps	Goals	Apps	Goals
River Plate Montevideo	2020	Uruguayan Primera División	11	0	—		0	0	11	0
River Plate Montevideo	2021	Uruguayan Primera División	1	0	—		—		1	0
Career total			12	0	0	0	0	0	12	0
