= Santiago Brunelli =

Uruguayan footballer (born 1998)

Personal information
- Full name: Santiago Brunelli Llorca
- Date of birth: 15 May 1998 (age 28)
- Place of birth: Montevideo, Uruguay
- Height: 1.90 m (6 ft 3 in)
- Position: Centre back

Youth career
- Plaza Colonia

Senior career*
Years	Team	Apps	(Gls)
2016–2020	Plaza Colonia	40	(1)
2020–2024	River Plate Montevideo	92	(3)
2024	Plaza Colonia	30	(2)
2025	Rampla Juniors	7	(0)
2026	Beroe Stara Zagora	15	(0)
- * Club domestic league appearances and goals as of 21 October 2026

Santiago Brunelli Llorca (born 15 May 1998) is a Uruguayan professional footballer who plays as a defender.
