= Juan Quintana (footballer, born 2000) =

Uruguayan association football player

Personal information
- Full name: Juan Ignacio Quintana Silva
- Date of birth: 4 January 2000 (age 26)
- Place of birth: Progreso, Uruguay
- Height: 1.76 m (5 ft 9 in)
- Position: Attacking midfielder

Team information
- Current team: River Plate
- Number: 37

Youth career
- Progreso
- River Plate

Senior career*
Years	Team	Apps	(Gls)
2021–	River Plate	17	(0)
2022–2023	→ La Luz (loan)	56	(8)
2024	→ Banfield (loan)	9	(1)
- * Club domestic league appearances and goals as of 7 September 2024

Juan Ignacio Quintana Silva (born 4 January 2000) is an Uruguayan footballer who plays as a midfielder for Uruguayan club River Plate.

== Early life ==
Quintana began playing youth football at age four with Progreso, before joining the youth system of Uruguayan club River Plate at age nine.

== Club career ==
On 17 January 2021, he made his senior debut for River Plate in the Uruguayan Primera División against Fénix. In 2022, he went on loan with La Luz in the Uruguayan Segunda División, helping them earn promotion to the top tier for 2023, and once again went on loan with the club for 2023. In January 2024, he was loaned to Argentine Primera División club Banfield for the year, with a purchase option. On 10 February 2024, he made his debut for Banfield, in which he also scored against Argentinos Juniors.

== Career statistics ==
As of 7 September 2024

Club	Season	League			Cup		Continental		Other		Total	
Club	Season	Division	Apps	Goals	Apps	Goals	Apps	Goals	Apps	Goals	Apps	Goals
River Plate	2020 (Note: Officially named the 2020 season, this season took place in 2020–21)	Uruguayan Primera División	8	0	0	0	—		—		8	0
River Plate	2021	Uruguayan Primera División	4	0	0	0	—		—		4	0
River Plate	2024	Uruguayan Primera División	5	0	0	0	—		—		5	0
River Plate	Total		17	0	0	0	0	0	0	0	17	0
La Luz (loan)	2022	Uruguayan Segunda División	21	1	0	0	—		—		21	1
La Luz (loan)	2023	Uruguayan Primera División	35	7	0	0	—		—		35	7
La Luz (loan)	Total		56	8	0	0	0	0	0	0	56	8
Banfield (loan)	2024	Argentine Primera División	9	1	2	0	—		—		11	1
Career total			82	9	2	0	0	0	0	0	84	9
