= Guzmán Rodríguez =

Uruguayan footballer (born 2000)

Personal information
- Full name: Guzmán Rodríguez Ferrari
- Date of birth: 8 February 2000 (age 26)
- Place of birth: Montevideo, Uruguay
- Height: 1.85 m (6 ft 1 in)
- Position: Centre-back

Team information
- Current team: Red Bull Bragantino
- Number: 2

Youth career
- 2016-2019: River Plate Montevideo

Senior career*
Years	Team	Apps	(Gls)
2019–2021	River Plate Montevideo	27	(0)
2021–2024	Boston River	81	(2)
2021	→ River Plate Montevideo (loan)	8	(0)
2024	Peñarol	31	(1)
2025–	Red Bull Bragantino	31	(1)
- * Club domestic league appearances and goals as of 14 December 2025

Guzmán Rodríguez Ferrari (born 8 February 2000) is a Uruguayan footballer who plays as a centre-back for Brazilian club Red Bull Bragantino.
