= Luciano Boggio =

Uruguayan footballer (born 1999)

Personal information
- Full name: Luciano Boggio Albín
- Date of birth: 10 March 1999 (age 27)
- Place of birth: Montevideo, Uruguay
- Height: 1.75 m (5 ft 9 in)
- Position: Midfielder

Team information
- Current team: Nacional
- Number: 6

Youth career
- Defensor Sporting

Senior career*
Years	Team	Apps	(Gls)
2019–2022	Defensor Sporting	61	(3)
2021	→ River Plate Montevideo (loan)	30	(6)
2022–2025	Lanús	89	(2)
2025–	Nacional	31	(3)
Medal record
Men's football
Representing Uruguay
South American Games
Silver medal – second place	2018 Cochabamba	Team
- * Club domestic league appearances and goals as of 1 October 2025

Luciano Boggio Albín (born 10 March 1999) is a Uruguayan footballer who plays as a midfielder for Uruguayan club Nacional.

== Career ==
Boggio started his career with Uruguayan side Defensor Sporting, where he has made 43 league appearances and scored 2 goals.

== Honours ==
Uruguay U20

- South American Games silver medal: 2018
