= 2022 Copa Uruguay =

Copa AUF Uruguay 2022

Tournament details
- Country: Uruguay
- Dates: 22 June – 13 November 2022
- Teams: 76

Final positions
- Champions: Defensor Sporting (1st title)
- Runners-up: La Luz

Tournament statistics
- Matches played: 77
- Goals scored: 197 (2.56 per match)
- Top goal scorer: Andrés Ferrari (4 goals)

The 2022 Copa Uruguay (officially known as Copa AUF Uruguay 2022), was the inaugural edition of the Copa Uruguay, the country's national football cup tournament. The tournament began on 22 June and ended on 13 November, and had 76 teams participating.

Defensor Sporting were the first winners of the competition, defeating La Luz in the final match 1–0.

== Format ==
The competition was divided into two stages: a preliminary stage and the national stage. In the preliminary stage, teams from the amateur lower leagues competed for 20 berths to the national stage. In the first phase of the national stage, 28 teams from the Primera División Amateur and Segunda División entered the competition, for a total of 48 teams which are divided into 24 ties, with the winners qualifying for the second round. The 24 second round winners advanced to play against each other to define 12 winners into the third phase.

32 teams played in the third phase: 12 winners from the previous phase, 16 professional teams from the Primera División, the best relegated team of Primera División the previous season (Progreso), the defending champion of the Primera División Amateur (Miramar Misiones) and the defending champion and runner-up of the Copa Nacional de Clubes (Central and Juventud (Colonia)). From this point onwards, the winners played against each other in single-legged knockout phases except for the semi-finals, which were played over two legs, whilst the Final was played in a single match.

The winner of the competition was also awarded a US$ 100,000 prize.

== Qualified teams ==
The following teams qualified for the competition. Villa Teresa declined to participate.

Primera División; All 16 teams of the 2022 season	Segunda División; All 12 teams of the 2022 season	Primera División Amateur; 22 teams of the 2022 season	Segunda División Amateur; The champion and runner-up of the 2021 season	OFI Serie A All 24 teams of the 2022 season
Albion; Boston River; Cerrito; Cerro Largo; Danubio; Defensor Sporting; Deportivo Maldonado; Fénix; Liverpool; Montevideo City Torque; Montevideo Wanderers; Nacional; Peñarol; Plaza Colonia; Rentistas; River Plate	Atenas; Central Español; Cerro; Juventud; La Luz; Miramar Misiones; Progreso; Racing; Rampla Juniors; Sud América; Uruguay Montevideo; Villa Española	Alto Perú; Artigas; Basáñez; Bella Vista; Canadian; Colón; Deportivo Colonia; Deportivo Italiano; Durazno; Huracán; Huracán Buceo; Los Halcones; Mar de Fondo; Oriental; Parque del Plata; Paysandú; Platense; Potencia; Rocha; Salto; Salus; Tacuarembó	Cooper; Paso de la Arena	Barrio Olímpico; Bella Vista (Paysandú); Boquita; Central; Huracán (Paysandú); Huracán (Rivera); Ituzaingó; Juanicó; Juventud (Colonia); Laureles; Lavalleja (Minas); Lavalleja (Rocha); Palermo; Piriápolis; Porongos; Progreso (Estación Atlántida); Quilmes; Río Negro; Santa Emilia; Sportivo Barracas; Universal; Universitario; Wanderers (Santa Lucía); Wanderers Juvenil

== Draw ==
The draw of the competition was held on 14 June 2022, at the Centro Cultural Teatro Español in Durazno. The draw was divided into two stages: in the first one the ties for the preliminary and first stages were drawn, dividing the entering teams into four zones according to geographical criteria: Norte, Sur/Metropolitana, Este, and Centro/Litoral, while in the second stage the ties for the third stage were drawn, involving the 20 Primera División, Segunda División, and OFI Serie A entrants.

== Preliminary stage ==
=== Zona Norte ===
22 June 2022	Tacuarembó	5–1	Cooper	Tacuarembó
14:30 UTC−3	Jardel 12', 45'; González 15'; Gómez 85'; Sosa 90+7'	Report	Hernández 13'	Stadium: Raúl Goyenola; Referee: Esteban Guerra

29 June 2022	Huracán (Rivera)	0–0 (3–4 p)	Canadian	Rivera
19:30 UTC−3		Report		Stadium: Atilio Paiva Olivera; Referee: Matías Schneider
	Penalties
	Rosano (penalty scored); Sena (penalty missed); Carneiro (penalty missed); Lima (penalty scored); Ramos (penalty scored)		(penalty missed) López; (penalty scored) Correa; (penalty scored) Lira; (penalty scored) Bonini; (penalty scored) Echeveste

=== Zona Sur/Metropolitana ===
22 June 2022	Oriental	0–1	Bella Vista	Montevideo
15:00 UTC−3		Report	Farinasso 6' (pen.)	Stadium: Parque ANCAP; Referee: Leandro Lasso

29 June 2022	Progreso (Estación Atlántida)	2–3	Alto Perú	Estación Atlántida
20:30 UTC−3	Otero 45'; Carvalho 90+4'	Report	Castro 31' (pen.); Lima 38'; Pedro 90+7'	Stadium: Progreso Estación Atlántida; Referee: Néstor Pereyra

=== Zona Este ===
23 June 2022	Barrio Olímpico	2–3	Lavalleja (Minas)	Minas
21:00 UTC−3	Martins 42'; Gutiérrez 55'	Report	Berrueta 12', 46'; Suárez 70'	Stadium: Juan Antonio Lavalleja; Referee: Sebastián Montenegro

30 June 2022	Basáñez	1–0	Ituzaingó	Montevideo
15:00 UTC−3	Ballestero 41'	Report		Stadium: La Bombonera; Referee: Andrés Martínez

=== Zona Centro/Litoral ===
23 June 2022	Durazno	1–0	Salus	Durazno
20:00 UTC−3	Deorta 75'	Report		Stadium: Silvestre Octavio Landoni; Referee: Juan Cianni

29 June 2022	Quilmes	2–0	Platense	Florida
21:00 UTC−3	Fernández 41' (o.g.); Salazar 87'	Report		Stadium: Campeones Olímpicos; Referee: Marcos Beltrán

== First stage ==
=== Zona Norte ===
6 July 2022	Paysandú	1–0	Bella Vista (Paysandú)	Paysandú
20:00 UTC−3	Da Silva 30' (pen.)	Report		Stadium: Parque Artigas; Referee: Nicolás Varela

13 July 2022	Tacuarembó	1–3	Central Español	Tacuarembó
18:00 UTC−3	N. González 78'	Report	Bueno 32'; I. González 45'; Acuña 62'	Stadium: Raúl Goyenola; Referee: Jonathan Fuentes

20 July 2022	Canadian	0–0 (8–9 p)	Racing	Montevideo
15:00 UTC−3				Stadium: Obdulio Varela; Referee: Federico Arman

20 July 2022	Wanderers Juvenil	1–2	Artigas	Tacuarembó
20:00 UTC−3	Pérez 6'		Moreira 57'; Lima 90'	Stadium: Raúl Goyenola; Referee: Washington Banchero

20 July 2022	Salto	0–0 (3–5 p)	Huracán (Paysandú)	Salto
21:00 UTC−3				Stadium: Juan José Vispo Mari; Referee: Andrés Martínez

27 July 2022	Universitario	Awarded	Sud América	Salto
20:00 UTC−3	Piriz 85'; Llama 89'		Posse 38'; Añasco 60'; Lemos 73'; Andaluz 75'	Stadium: Ernesto Dickinson; Referee: Santiago Motta
Note: Match awarded to Universitario due to Sud América fielding an ineligible player.

=== Zona Sur/Metropolitana ===
6 July 2022	Río Negro	3–1	Wanderers (Santa Lucía)	San José
20:00 UTC−3	Gómez 36', 46'; Martín 88'	Report	Rubbo 31' (pen.)	Stadium: Casto Martínez Laguarda; Referee: Fernando Martínez

7 July 2022	Juanicó	1–2	Deportivo Italiano	Canelones
20:00 UTC−3	Veropalumbo 60'	Report	Bass 21', 55'	Stadium: Martínez Monegal; Referee: Gonzalo de León

14 July 2022	Alto Perú	0–4	Juventud	Montevideo
13:30 UTC−3		Report	Santucho 32'; Milans 35'; Amaral 51'; Sena 89'	Stadium: Parque Palermo; Referee: Diego Dunajec

20 July 2022	Bella Vista	0–1	Rampla Juniors	Las Piedras
15:00 UTC−3			Ferreira 42'	Stadium: Parque Artigas; Referee: Yimmi Álvarez

20 July 2022	Parque del Plata	1–3	Universal	Parque del Plata
20:00 UTC−3	A. Torres 9'		D. Torres 20', 62'; Elizeche 30'	Stadium: Parque El Balneario; Referee: Diego Nisivoccia

27 July 2022	Potencia	0–7	La Luz	Montevideo
14:30 UTC−3			Fuentes 9'; Sequeira 18'; Hernández 21'; Romero 69'; Da Fonte 82'; Fagúndez 86'; Núñez 89'	Stadium: Complejo Rentistas; Referee: Federico Arman

=== Zona Este ===
6 July 2022	Mar de Fondo	4–0	Huracán	Montevideo
13:30 UTC−3	Penas 7'; Ferreira 26'; Hernández 57'; Giovanoni 77'	Report		Stadium: Parque Palermo; Referee: Gonzalo Pérez

14 July 2022	Palermo	2–2 (4–3 p)	Piriápolis	Rocha
20:00 UTC−3	Díaz 25'; Martiñones 45'	Report	Castellanos 23'; Santos 71'	Stadium: Mario Sobrero; Referee: Marcelo Palacios

20 July 2022	Basáñez	0–4	Uruguay Montevideo	Montevideo
13:30 UTC−3			Quiroga 42'; Ramos 50'; Villalba 85'; Rosa 90'	Stadium: Complejo Rentistas; Referee: Daniel Fedorczuk

20 July 2022	Rocha	2–0	Paso de la Arena	Rocha
20:00 UTC−3	Suárez 17'; Resquini 61'			Stadium: Mario Sobrero; Referee: Hernán Heras

20 July 2022	Lavalleja (Minas)	1–1 (3–4 p)	Atenas	Minas
20:00 UTC−3	Suárez 80'		Britos 39'	Stadium: Juan Antonio Lavalleja; Referee: Pablo Giménez

21 July 2022	Lavalleja (Rocha)	1–2	Huracán Buceo	Rocha
20:00 UTC−3	Maldonado 59'		Antúnez 4'; Pérez 36'	Stadium: Mario Sobrero; Referee: Jonhy Cidades

=== Zona Centro/Litoral ===
6 July 2022	Deportivo Colonia	3–1	Santa Emilia	Colonia del Sacramento
20:00 UTC−3	Bertoli 7' (pen.); Taberne 50'; Curbelo 90+4'	Report	Garaza 55'	Stadium: Parque Juan Prandi; Referee: Aníbal Vogrincic

13 July 2022	Durazno	3–2	Cerro	Durazno
20:00 UTC−3	Viera 64'; Samaniego 69'; Deorta 77'	Report	Cóccaro 14'; González 57'	Stadium: Silvestre Octavio Landoni; Attendance: 2,500; Referee: Yimmi Álvarez

20 July 2022	Los Halcones	0–0 (3–2 p)	Sportivo Barracas	Montevideo
15:00 UTC−3				Stadium: Parque ANCAP; Referee: Federico Modernell
	Penalties
	Trujillo (penalty scored); Olivera (penalty scored); Tubín (penalty missed); Morales (penalty scored)		(penalty scored) Castillo; (penalty missed) Cabrera; (penalty missed) Otazú; (penalty scored) Aquino; (penalty missed) Planchón

20 July 2022	Laureles	0–2	Colón	Fray Bentos
20:30 UTC−3			Moreira 31'; Acevedo 90+6'	Stadium: Parque Pablo Enrique Abbate; Referee: Carlos Paz

20 July 2022	Quilmes	Awarded	Villa Española	Florida
20:30 UTC−3			Aguilera 50'	Stadium: Campeones Olímpicos; Referee: Javier Feres
Note: Match awarded to Quilmes due to Villa Española fielding ineligible players.

3 August 2022	Porongos	0–3; Awarded	Boquita	Trinidad
20:00 UTC−3	De Carlos 56' (pen.), 90+6'			Stadium: Juan Antonio Lavalleja; Referee: Néstor Coelho
Note: Match awarded to Boquita due to Porongos fielding an ineligible player.

== Second stage ==
=== Zona Norte ===
3 August 2022	Racing	1–0	Huracán (Paysandú)	Montevideo
13:30 UTC−3	Gorocito 46' (pen.)			Stadium: Parque Palermo; Referee: Leandro Lasso

9 August 2022	Central Español	1–1 (4–3 p)	Artigas	Montevideo
13:30 UTC−3	Sánchez 63'		Márquez 75'	Stadium: Parque Palermo; Referee: Daniel Rodríguez

10 August 2022	Universitario	1–0	Paysandú	Salto
20:00 UTC−3	Jaques 21'			Stadium: Ernesto Dickinson; Referee: Cristian Bouvier

=== Zona Sur/Metropolitana ===
10 August 2022	Rampla Juniors	1–1 (4–2 p)	Río Negro	Montevideo
15:00 UTC−3	Machado 16'		Cardozo 73'	Stadium: Olímpico; Referee: Nicolás Vignolo

10 August 2022	La Luz	1–1 (4–1 p)	Deportivo Italiano	Montevideo
15:00 UTC−3	Gutiérrez 22'		Mayer 7'	Stadium: Complejo Rentistas; Referee: Pablo Giménez

10 August 2022	Juventud	1–0	Universal	Canelones
20:00 UTC−3	Sena 53'			Stadium: Martínez Monegal; Referee: Yimmi Álvarez

=== Zona Este ===
3 August 2022	Rocha	1–1 (5–4 p)	Huracán Buceo	Rocha
20:00 UTC−3	Raguso 9'		Ruiz 22'	Stadium: Mario Sobrero; Referee: Eduardo Varela

16 August 2022	Uruguay Montevideo	2–1	Palermo	Montevideo
22:10 UTC−3	Avilés 36' (pen.); Villalba 49'		Figueroa 9'	Stadium: Parque Palermo; Referee: Santiago Motta

17 August 2022	Atenas	0–1	Mar de Fondo	Montevideo
13:45 UTC−3			Sebben 90+4'	Stadium: Parque Palermo; Referee: Federico Arman

=== Zona Centro/Litoral ===
10 August 2022	Colón	3–1	Los Halcones	Montevideo
13:30 UTC−3	Hernández 33'; Vignone 40'; Pintos 64'		Olivera 56'	Stadium: Parque Palermo; Referee: Adrián Pereira

10 August 2022	Quilmes	1–2	Deportivo Colonia	Florida
20:30 UTC−3	Camejo 78'		Perdomo 85', 89'	Stadium: Campeones Olímpicos; Referee: Andrés Castro

17 August 2022	Durazno	2–1	Boquita	Durazno
20:00 UTC−3	Olazabal 3'; Deorta 21'		Ghirardi 72'	Stadium: Silvestre Octavio Landoni; Referee: Adrián Pereira

== Third stage ==
23 August 2022	Rocha	0–3	Rentistas	Rocha
20:00 UTC−3			Guichón 24'; Acevedo 59' (pen.), 74'	Stadium: Mario Sobrero; Referee: Jonathan Fuentes

23 August 2022	Juventud (Colonia)	1–2	River Plate	Colonia del Sacramento
20:30 UTC−3	Torres 59'		Chopitea 9'; Clar 64'	Stadium: Profesor Alberto Suppici; Referee: Pablo Giménez

31 August 2022	La Luz	2–1	Fénix	Montevideo
13:45 UTC−3	Hernández 42'; Siles 62'		Amaral 19'	Stadium: Parque Palermo; Referee: Bruno Sacarelo

31 August 2022	Uruguay Montevideo	2–4	Montevideo City Torque	Montevideo
15:00 UTC−3	Taján 18'; Díaz 90+5'		Palacios 3'; Ribas 11' (pen.), 36'; Arismendi 87'	Stadium: Centenario; Referee: Antonio García

31 August 2022	Juventud	0–0 (4–5 p)	Albion	Las Piedras
15:00 UTC−3				Stadium: Parque Artigas; Referee: Pablo Giménez

31 August 2022	Progreso	2–2 (4–3 p)	Danubio	Montevideo
15:15 UTC−3	López 6'; García 18'		Pintos 90+3', 90+5'	Stadium: Abraham Paladino; Referee: Yimmi Álvarez

31 August 2022	Durazno	1–3	Plaza Colonia	Durazno
20:00 UTC−3	Viera 2'		Pérez 24'; Quintana 47', 49'	Stadium: Silvestre Octavio Landoni; Referee: Jonathan Fuentes

31 August 2022	Central Español	1–2	Liverpool	Montevideo
20:15 UTC−3	Paiva 58'		Cayetano 76'; Rodríguez 82'	Stadium: Parque Palermo; Referee: Diego Dunajec

1 September 2022	Mar de Fondo	0–1	Cerrito	Montevideo
13:45 UTC−3			Canosa 51'	Stadium: Parque Palermo; Referee: Santiago Motta

6 September 2022	Rampla Juniors	2–1	Deportivo Maldonado	Montevideo
15:00 UTC−3	Ferreira 9'; Ratti 64'		Borges 32'	Stadium: Olímpico; Referee: Daniel Fedorczuk

6 September 2022	Universitario	1–3	Montevideo Wanderers	Salto
20:30 UTC−3	Jaques 80'		Cosentino 29'; Santurio 33', 45' (pen.)	Stadium: Ernesto Dickinson; Referee: Diego Dunajec

7 September 2022	Racing	0–1	Defensor Sporting	Montevideo
13:45 UTC−3			Bernal 74'	Stadium: Parque Palermo; Referee: Daniel Rodríguez

7 September 2022	Deportivo Colonia	0–2	Cerro Largo	Colonia del Sacramento
20:00 UTC−3			Da Costa 82'; Miranda 85'	Stadium: Parque Juan Prandi; Referee: Antonio García

7 September 2022	Central	0–2	Boston River	San José
20:00 UTC−3			López 8'; Gómez 30'	Stadium: Casto Martínez Laguarda; Referee: Yimmi Álvarez

7 September 2022	Miramar Misiones	0–1	Nacional	Paysandú
20:15 UTC−3			I. Ramírez 52'	Stadium: Parque Artigas; Referee: Pablo Giménez

8 September 2022	Colón	0–2	Peñarol	Montevideo
20:15 UTC−3			Menosse 53'; Núñez 64'	Stadium: Centenario; Referee: Bruno Sacarelo

== Bracket ==
Round of 16
Cerrito	0 (3)
Montevideo City Torque (p)	0 (5)
Rentistas	0
Progreso	3
Defensor Sporting	2
River Plate	0
Liverpool	4
Montevideo Wanderers	0
Plaza Colonia	1
Cerro Largo	0
Peñarol (p)	0 (4)
Boston River	0 (3)
Rampla Juniors	3
Nacional	0
Albion	2
La Luz	3

Quarter-finals
Montevideo City Torque	1
Progreso	2
Defensor Sporting	3
Liverpool	0
Plaza Colonia	0
Peñarol	1
Rampla Juniors	2
La Luz	3

Semi-finals
Progreso	1	1	2
Defensor Sporting	1	3	4
Peñarol	1	0	1 (2)
La Luz (p)	0	1	1 (4)

Final
Defensor Sporting	1
La Luz	0

== Round of 16 ==
21 September 2022	Rentistas	0–3	Progreso	Montevideo
15:30 UTC−3			García 4'; González 21'; Roldán 47'	Stadium: Complejo Rentistas; Referee: Diego Dunajec

21 September 2022	Albion	2–3	La Luz	Montevideo
15:30 UTC−3	Barros 23'; Papa 51'		Machado 2'; Sequeira 26'; Ramírez 90'	Stadium: Jardines del Hipódromo; Referee: Yimmi Álvarez

21 September 2022	Rampla Juniors	3–0	Nacional	Montevideo
20:00 UTC−3	Silvera 31'; Cachi 76'; Melazzi 85'			Stadium: Centenario; Referee: Bruno Sacarelo

21 September 2022	Plaza Colonia	1–0	Cerro Largo	Colonia del Sacramento
20:30 UTC−3	Rodríguez 73'			Stadium: Parque Juan Prandi; Referee: Pablo Giménez

27 September 2022	Liverpool	4–0	Montevideo Wanderers	Montevideo
15:30 UTC−3	Rivero 10', 52'; Figueredo 56'; González 90+2'			Stadium: Belvedere; Referee: Diego Dunajec

28 September 2022	Defensor Sporting	2–0	River Plate	Montevideo
20:30 UTC−3	Ferrari 41'; Duarte 76'			Stadium: Luis Franzini; Referee: Mathías De Armas

28 September 2022	Peñarol	0–0 (4–3 p)	Boston River	Montevideo
20:30 UTC−3				Stadium: Campeón del Siglo; Referee: Jonathan Fuentes

28 September 2022	Cerrito	0–0 (3–5 p)	Montevideo City Torque	Montevideo
21:00 UTC−3				Stadium: Charrúa; Referee: Pablo Giménez

== Quarter-finals ==
4 October 2022	Defensor Sporting	3–0	Liverpool	Montevideo
17:30 UTC−3	Scotto 4'; Ferrari 30'; Jorge 83'			Stadium: Luis Franzini; Referee: Pablo Giménez

5 October 2022	Montevideo City Torque	1–2	Progreso	Montevideo
16:00 UTC−3	Guzmán 13'		López 4'; Colmán 18'	Stadium: Parque Alfredo Víctor Viera; Referee: Nicolás Vignolo

5 October 2022	Plaza Colonia	0–1	Peñarol	Paysandú
20:30 UTC−3			Milans 61'	Stadium: Parque Artigas; Referee: Mathías de Armas

12 October 2022	Rampla Juniors	2–3	La Luz	Montevideo
16:00 UTC−3	Hernández 25' (o.g.); Ferreira 74'		Sequeira 14'; Quintana 19'; Machado 30'	Stadium: Olímpico; Referee: Santiago Motta

== Semi-finals ==
Team 1	Agg.	Team 2	1st leg	2nd leg
Progreso	2–4	Defensor Sporting	1–1	1–3
Peñarol	1–1 (2–4 p)	La Luz	1–0	0–1

=== First leg ===
26 October 2022	Progreso	1–1	Defensor Sporting	Montevideo
16:30 UTC−3	González 90+6'	Report	Abaldo 60'	Stadium: Abraham Paladino; Referee: Diego Dunajec

27 October 2022	Peñarol	1–0	La Luz	Montevideo
20:00 UTC−3	Menosse 69'	Report		Stadium: Campeón del Siglo; Referee: Santiago Motta

=== Second leg ===
1 November 2022	La Luz	1–0 (1–1 agg.) (4–2 p)	Peñarol	Montevideo
20:00 UTC−3	Silva 87' (pen.)			Stadium: Centenario; Referee: Gustavo Tejera
	Penalties
	Méndez (penalty scored); Viera (penalty missed); Cardozo (penalty scored); Castillo (penalty scored); Martínez (penalty scored)		(penalty missed) Lozano; (penalty scored) Méndez; (penalty missed) Viatri; (penalty scored) Bentancourt

3 November 2022	Defensor Sporting	3–1 (4–2 agg.)	Progreso	Montevideo
20:00 UTC−3	Ferrari 53', 86'; Balboa 79'		Labraga 31'	Stadium: Luis Franzini; Referee: Jonathan Fuentes

== Final ==
13 November 2022
16:00 UTC−3

Defensor Sporting	1–0	La Luz
Martínez 87' (o.g.)	Report

Estadio Centenario, Montevideo
Referee: Andrés Cunha

Defensor Sporting	La Luz

GK	23	(Uruguay) Matías Dufour
DF	17	(Uruguay) Agustín Sant'Anna
DF	26	(Uruguay) Facundo Mallo
DF	13	(Uruguay) Alan Matturro
DF	33	(Uruguay) Gonzalo Camargo
MF	24	(Uruguay) Lucas de los Santos
MF	8	(Argentina) Fernando Elizari	(substituted off) 84'
MF	16	(Uruguay) Gonzalo Freitas
MF	7	(Uruguay) Agustín Ocampo	(substituted off) 69'
FW	9	(Uruguay) Andrés Ferrari
FW	11	(Uruguay) Adrián Balboa	(substituted off) 43'
Substitutes:
GK	1	(Uruguay) Nicolás Rossi
DF	3	(Uruguay) Lucas Rodríguez
DF	4	(Uruguay) Matías Rocha
FW	10	(Uruguay) Anderson Duarte	(substituted on) 43'
MF	19	(Uruguay) Matías Abaldo	(substituted on) 69'
FW	20	(Uruguay) Álvaro Navarro	(substituted on) 69'
DF	22	(Uruguay) Renzo Rabino
DF	25	(Uruguay) Sebastián Boselli
MF	27	(Uruguay) Juan Manuel Jorge
MF	29	(Uruguay) Germán Barrios
Manager:
(Uruguay) Marcelo Méndez

GK	12	(Uruguay) Jhonny da Silva
DF	3	(Uruguay) Sebastián Cardozo	(yellow card) 90+5'
DF	23	(Uruguay) Enzo Castillo
DF	22	(Uruguay) Juan Pablo Fagúndez		(substituted off) 45'
MF	8	(Uruguay) Rodrigo Viera
MF	30	(Uruguay) Juan Quintana
MF	15	(Uruguay) Álvaro González	(yellow card) 90'	(substituted off) 77'
MF	16	(Uruguay) Aníbal Hernández (c)		(substituted off) 73'
MF	10	(Uruguay) Santiago Ramírez		(substituted off) 90'
FW	26	(Uruguay) Luis Machado
FW	11	(Uruguay) Horacio Sequeira		(substituted off) 45'
Substitutes:
GK	1	(Uruguay) Ramiro Méndez
DF	2	(Uruguay) Édgar Martínez	(red card) 89'	(substituted on) 45'
FW	7	(Uruguay) Alejandro Siles
FW	9	(Uruguay) Pablo Silva
FW	13	(Uruguay) Santiago Pallares
MF	14	(Uruguay) Pablo Porcile		(substituted on) 73'
FW	17	(Panama) Cristian Quintero		(substituted on) 45'
MF	18	(Uruguay) Emanuel Fuentes		(substituted on) 77'
MF	19	(Uruguay) Nicolás da Fonte
MF	20	(Uruguay) Leandro Méndez		(substituted on) 90'
Manager:
(Uruguay) Julio Fuentes

== Top scorers ==
Rank	Name	Club	Goals
1	(Uruguay) Andrés Ferrari	Defensor Sporting	4
2	(Uruguay) Horacio Sequeira	La Luz	3
2	(Uruguay) Matías Deorta	Durazno	3
4	22 players		2

Source: AUF

== See also ==
- 2022 Uruguayan Primera División season
- 2022 Uruguayan Segunda División season
