= List of football stadiums in Uruguay =

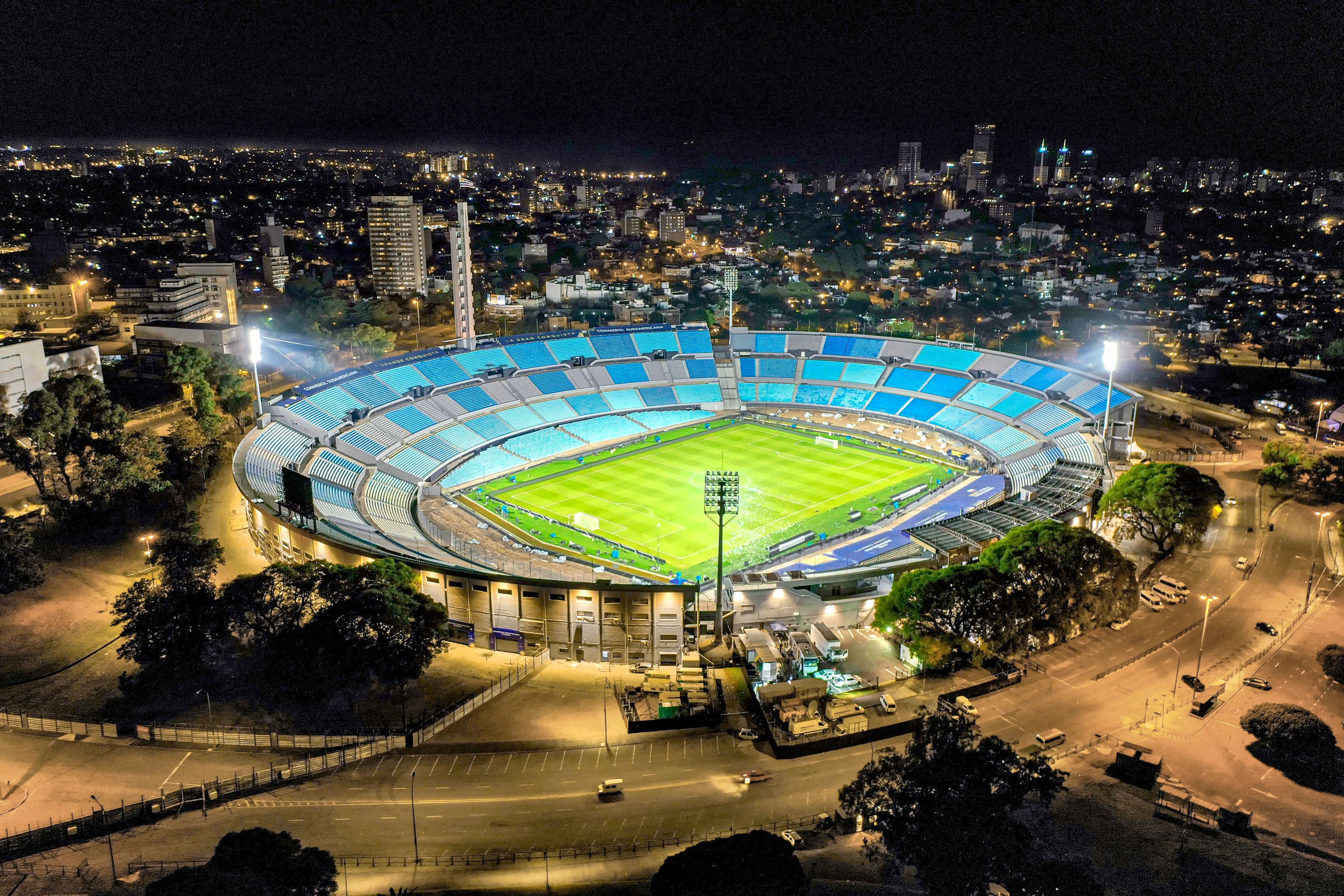
Estadio Centenario

Uruguayan Football Stadiums are mainly used by clubs in the Uruguayan League and in some cases are maintained by the various departmental governments. The nation's oldest stadium is the Gran Parque Central Stadium, owned Nacional, built in 1900, while the largest capacity stadium is the Centenario Stadium, owned by the Intendancy of Montevideo, with 60,235 spectators.

The following is a list of football stadiums in Uruguay, ordered by capacity.

== Current stadiums ==
#	Image	Stadium	Capacity	City	Home team	Sport(s)
1		Estadio Centenario	60,235	Montevideo	Uruguay national football team	Football
2		Estadio Campeón del Siglo	40,165	Montevideo	Club Atlético Peñarol	Football
3		Estadio Gran Parque Central	34,446	Montevideo	Club Nacional de Football	Football
4		Estádio Domingo Burgeño	30,152	Maldonado	Deportivo Maldonado	Football
5		Estadio Atilio Paiva Olivera	27,135	Rivera	Selección de fútbol de Rivera, Frontera Rivera	Football
6		Estadio Luis Tróccoli	25,000	Montevideo	CA Cerro	Football
7		Estadio Parque Artigas	25,000	Paysandú	Selección de fútbol de Paysandú and Paysandú F.C.	Football
8		Estadio Luis Franzini	18,000	Montevideo	Defensor Sporting	Football
9		Estadio José Nasazzi	15,000	Montevideo	Club Atlético Bella Vista	Football
10		Estadio Charrúa	14,000	Montevideo	Los Teros and Peñarol Rugby	Football, rugby union
11		Estadio Goyenola	12,000	Tacuarembó	Tacuarembó FC	Football
12		Estadio Parque Artigas Las Piedras	12,000	Las Piedras	Juventud LP	Football
13		Jardines del Hipódromo	11,018	Montevideo	Danubio	Football
14		Estadio Belvedere	10,000	Montevideo	Liverpool FC	Football
15		Estadio Parque Capurro	10,000	Montevideo	Fénix	Football
16		Estadio Olimpico	9,500	Montevideo	Rampla Juniors FC	Football
17		Estadio Arquitecto Antonio Eleuterio Ubilla	9,000	Melo	Cerro Largo FC	Football
18		Estadio Municipal Doctor Mario Sobrero	8,000	Rocha	Rocha Fútbol Club	Football
19		Estadio Viera	7,527	Montevideo	Montevideo Wanderers FC	Football
20		Estadio Profesor Alberto Suppici	6,500	Colonia	Plaza Colonia	Football
21		Estadio Complejo Rentistas	6,500	Montevideo	CA Rentistas	Football

== See also ==
- List of South American stadiums by capacity
- List of association football stadiums by capacity
- Officials championships of football of Uruguay
- List of association football stadiums by capacity
- List of association football stadiums by country
- List of sports venues by capacity
- List of stadiums by capacity
- Lists of stadiums
- Football in Uruguay
