= 2021 Uruguayan Segunda División season =

Segunda División
- Season: 2021
- Champions: Albion (1st title)
- Promoted: Albion; Danubio; Defensor Sporting
- Relegated: Villa Teresa; Rocha
- Matches: 115
- Goals: 256 (2.23 per match)

The 2021 Uruguayan Segunda División was the season of second division professional of football in Uruguay. A total of 12 teams competed; the top two teams and the winner of the Championship play-offs were promoted to the Uruguayan Primera División.
On 19 March 2021, Nicolás Siri became the youngest hat-trick scorer in the history of Uruguayan football and the second in South America behind Pelé, after scoring a hat-trick in Danubio's 5–1 win against Boston River, at the age of 16 years and 11 months.

== Club information ==
Club	City	Stadium	Capacity
Albion	Montevideo	Parque Enrique Falco	2,000
Atenas	San Carlos	Atenas	6,000
Central Español	Montevideo	Parque Palermo	6,500
Cerro	Montevideo	Luis Trócolli	24,000
Danubio	Montevideo	Jardines del Hipódromo	14,401
Defensor Sporting	Montevideo	Luis Franzini	18,000
Juventud	Las Piedras	Parque Artigas	12,000
Racing	Montevideo	Osvaldo Roberto	8,500
Rampla Juniors	Montevideo	Olímpico	9,500
Rocha	Rocha	Doctor Mario Sobrero	10,000
Uruguay Montevideo	Montevideo	Parque ANCAP	4,000
Villa Teresa	Montevideo	José Nasazzi	5,002

== Standings ==
Pos	Team	Pld	W	D	L	GF	GA	GD	Pts	Promotion or relegation
1	Albion (C, P)	22	13	5	4	31	18	+13	44	Promotion to 2022 Primera División
2	Danubio (P)	22	12	5	5	24	14	+10	41	Promotion to 2022 Primera División
3	Racing	22	10	8	4	27	16	+11	38	Qualification to Promotion Playoffs
4	Defensor Sporting	22	11	4	7	33	21	+12	37	Qualification to Promotion Playoffs
5	Cerro	22	10	7	5	26	20	+6	37	Qualification to Promotion Playoffs
6	Central Español	22	9	6	7	29	29	0	33	Qualification to Promotion Playoffs
7	Juventud	22	8	5	9	27	27	0	29	
8	Uruguay Montevideo	22	7	4	11	21	27	−6	25	
9	Atenas	22	5	9	8	20	17	+3	24	
10	Rampla Juniors	22	5	6	11	14	32	−18	21	
11	Villa Teresa	22	4	6	12	17	32	−15	18	
12	Rocha	22	4	3	15	20	36	−16	15	

Updated to match(es) played on 10 November 2021. Source: Soccerway
Rules for classification: 1st points; 2nd goal difference; 3rd goals scored; 4th head-to-head points; 5th head-to-head goal difference; 6th head-to-head goals scored. This does not apply to determining the champion. If two or more teams had been tied in point at the end of the tournament, a playoff would have been held at a neutral venue within 72 hours for the championship
(C) Champions; (P) Promoted

=== Promotion Playoffs ===
==== Semi-finals ====
===== First leg =====
30 November 2021
19:00

Cerro	1–2	Defensor Sporting
Núñez 34'	Report	Denis 7' (o.g.); Matturro 51'

Estadio Charrúa
Referee: Antonio García
30 November 2021
21:45

Central Español	0–0	Racing
	Report

Estadio Charrúa
Referee: Fernando Falce

===== Second leg =====
3 December 2021
19:00

Racing	1–1	Central Español
Cruz 55'	Report	Villalpando 30'

Estadio Charrúa
Referee: Pablo Giménez
3 December 2021
21:45

Defensor Sporting	0–1	Cerro
	Report	Coelho 59'

Estadio Charrúa
Referee: Jonathan Fuentes
- Racing and Defensor Sporting advanced to the Finals due to having a better campaign.

==== Finals ====
6 December 2021
21:45

Defensor Sporting	3–0	Racing
Méndez 22'; Abaldo 63'; Valiente 87'	Report

Estadio Charrúa
Referee: Mathias De Armas
9 December 2021
20:30

Racing	0–0	Defensor Sporting

Estadio Charrúa

Defensor Sporting won 3–0 on aggregate and were promoted to Primera División.

== Relegation ==
Pos	Team	2020 Pts	2021 Pts	Total Pts	Total Pld	Avg	Relegation
1	Danubio	—	41	41	22	1.864	
2	Defensor Sporting	—	37	37	22	1.682	
3	Cerro	—	37	37	22	1.682	
4	Racing	30	38	68	44	1.545	
5	Albion	22	44	66	44	1.5	
6	Juventud	32	29	61	44	1.386	
7	Central Español	27	33	60	44	1.364	
8	Rampla Juniors	32	21	53	44	1.205	
9	Uruguay Montevideo	—	25	25	22	1.136	
10	Atenas	24	24	48	44	1.091	
11	Villa Teresa (R)	26	18	44	44	1	Relegation Playoff Matches
12	Rocha (R)	27	15	42	44	0.955	Relegation to Primera División Amateur

=== Relegation playoffs ===
6 December 2021
19:00

Villa Teresa	2–0	La Luz
Fagúndez 45'; Ayala 70' (pen.)	Report

Estadio Charrúa
Referee: Diego Dunajec
11 December 2021
9:45

La Luz	3–1 (a.e.t.)	Villa Teresa
Méndez 34'; Siles 45'; Píriz 90+13'	Report	Osores 3'
Penalties
	3–2

Estadio Luis Franzini
Referee: Nicolás Vignolo

Tied 3–3 on aggregate. La Luz won on penalties and were promoted to Segunda División.

== Top scorers ==
Rank	Player	Club	Goals
1	(Uruguay) Diego Coelho	Cerro	24
2	(Uruguay) Diego Vera	Defensor Sporting	23
3	(Uruguay) Matías Britos	Atenas	22
3	(Uruguay) Pablo González	Albión	22
3	(Uruguay) Alejo Cruz	Racing	22

== See also ==
- 2021 in Uruguayan football
