= 2019 Uruguayan Segunda División season =

Segunda División
- Season: 2019
- Champions: Torque
- Promoted: Torque; Deportivo Maldonado; Rentistas
- Relegated: Bella Vista; El Tanque Sisley

The 2019 Uruguayan Segunda División was the season of second division professional of football in Uruguay. A total of 12 teams competed; the top two teams and the winner of the Championship play-offs were promoted to the Uruguayan Primera División.

== Club information ==
Club	City	Stadium	Capacity
Albion	Montevideo	Parque Enrique Falco	2,000
Atenas	San Carlos	Atenas	6,000
Bella Vista	Montevideo	José Nasazzi	15,000
Central Español	Montevideo	Parque Palermo	6,500
Cerrito	Montevideo	Parque Maracaná	8,000
Deportivo Maldonado	Maldonado	Domingo Burgueño Miguel	22,000
Rentistas	Montevideo	Complejo Rentistas	10,600
Sud América	Minas	Juan Antonio Lavalleja	8,000
Tacuarembó	Tacuarembó	Estadio Goyenola	12,000
Torque	Montevideo	Daniel Marsicano	
Villa Española	Montevideo	Obdulio Varela	8,000
Villa Teresa	Montevideo	José Nasazzi	5,002

== Standings ==
Pos	Team	Pld	W	D	L	GF	GA	GD	Pts	Promotion or relegation
1	Torque	22	12	7	3	28	14	+14	43	Promotion to 2020 Primera División
2	Deportivo Maldonado	22	12	4	6	30	20	+10	40	Promotion to 2020 Primera División
3	Rentistas	22	11	6	5	28	19	+9	39	Qualification to Promotion Playoffs
4	Villa Española	22	10	6	6	30	25	+5	36	Qualification to Promotion Playoffs
5	Cerrito	22	8	6	8	26	23	+3	30	Qualification to Promotion Playoffs
6	Sud América	22	8	6	8	16	17	−1	30	Qualification to Promotion Playoffs
7	Atenas	22	8	5	9	30	27	+3	29	
8	Villa Teresa	22	8	4	10	24	27	−3	28	
9	Albion	22	7	6	9	21	28	−7	27	
10	Central Español	22	6	6	10	18	25	−7	24	
11	Bella Vista	22	6	2	14	23	40	−17	20	
12	Tacuarembó	22	5	4	13	19	28	−9	19	

Updated to match(es) played on February 2021. Source: Soccerway
Rules for classification: 1st points; 2nd goal difference; 3rd goals scored; 4th head-to-head points; 5th head-to-head goal difference; 6th head-to-head goals scored. This does not apply to determining the champion. If two or more teams had been tied in point at the end of the tournament, a playoff would have been held at a neutral venue within 72 hours for the championship

=== Promotion Playoffs ===
==== Semi-finals ====
===== First leg =====
9 November 2019

Sud América	0–0	Rentistas

9 November 2019

Cerrito	0–2	Villa Española

===== Second leg =====
16 November 2019

Rentistas	4–0	Sud América

16 November 2019

Villa Española	0–1	Cerrito

==== Finals ====
7 December 2019

Villa Española	1–1	Rentistas

14 December 2019

Rentistas	2–0	Villa Española

== Relegation ==
Pos	Team	2018 Pts	2019 Pts	Total Pts	Total Pld	Avg	Relegation
1	Torque	—	43	43	22	1.955	
2	Deportivo Maldonado	35	40	75	48	1.563	
3	Cerrito	37	30	67	48	1.396	
4	Rentistas	28	39	67	48	1.396	
5	Sud América	35	30	65	48	1.354	
6	Villa Española	29	36	65	48	1.354	
7	Villa Teresa	36	28	64	48	1.333	
8	Atenas	—	29	29	22	1.318	
9	Central Español	32	24	56	48	1.167	
10	Albion	28	27	55	48	1.146	
11	Tacuarembó	35	19	54	48	1.125	
12	Bella Vista	—	20	20	22	0.909	Relegation to Primera División Amateur
13	El Tanque Sisley	—	—	—	—	—	Relegation to Primera División Amateur

== See also ==
- 2019 in Uruguayan football
