= Club Universitario de Deportes in South American football =

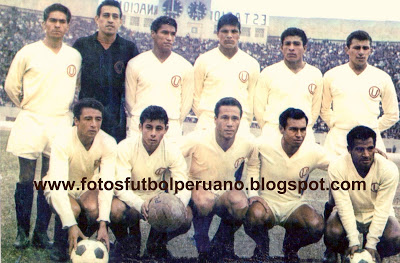
- Universitario in 1967
- Club: Club Universitario de Deportes
- Seasons played: 47
- Most appearances: Ángel Uribe (59)
- Top scorer: Percy Rojas (16)
- First entry: 1961 Copa Libertadores
- Latest entry: 2023 Copa Sudamericana

Titles
- Copa Libertadores: 0 (Best: Runners-up)
- Copa Sudamericana: 0 (Best: Quarter finals)
- Copa CONMEBOL: 0 (Best: Semifinal)

Club Universitario de Deportes, also known as Universitario or La "U", is a Peruvian football club based in Lima. The club has participated in 47 editions of club competitions governed by CONMEBOL, the chief authority in South American football. These include 33 seasons in the Copa Libertadores, 8 season in the Copa Sudamericana, 4 seasons in the Copa Merconorte and 2 seasons in the Copa CONMEBOL. The club plays its home matches at the Estadio Monumental "U" since it was opened in late 2000 for international competitions. Prior to this stadium's opening, Universitario chose to be the home team in Peru's Estadio Nacional since it began competing in the Copa Libertadores.

== Overall ==
Tournament	S	Pld	W	D	L	GF	GA	GD
Copa Libertadores	33	228	72	69	87	265	312	-47
Copa Sudamericana	7	20	5	5	10	20	28	-8
Copa Merconorte	4	24	6	7	11	27	35	-8
Copa CONMEBOL	2	8	2	1	5	7	13	-6

== Copa Libertadores ==
Season	Stage	Opponent	Date	Venue	Score	Agg	Ref
1961	First round	(Uruguay) Peñarol	19 April 1961	Estadio Centenario, Montevideo	0–5 (A)	2–5	
1961	First round	(Uruguay) Peñarol	30 April 1961	Estadio Nacional, Lima	2–0 (H)	2–5	
1965	Group stage	(Brazil) Santos	19 February 1965	Estadio Nacional, Lima	1–2 (H)		
1965	Group stage	Universidad de Chile	22 February 1965	Estadio Nacional, Lima	1–0 (H)		
1965	Group stage	(Brazil) Santos	6 March 1965	Pacaembu, São Paulo	1–2 (A)		
1965	Group stage	Universidad de Chile	10 March 1965	Estadio Nacional, Santiago	2–5 (A)		
1966	Group stage	(Peru) Alianza Lima	5 February 1966	Estadio Nacional, Lima	2–0 (H)		
1966	Group stage	(Venezuela) Deportivo Italia	9 February 1966	Olympic Stadium, Caracas	2–2 (A)		
1966	Group stage	(Venezuela) Deportivo Lara	12 February 1966	Olympic Stadium, Caracas	0–0 (A)		
1966	Group stage	(Argentina) Boca Juniors	17 February 1966	Estadio Nacional, Lima	2–1 (H)		
1966	Group stage	(Argentina) River Plate	23 February 1966	Estadio Nacional, Lima	1–1 (H)		
1966	Group stage	(Argentina) River Plate	2 March 1966	Estadio Monumental, Buenos Aires	0–5 (A)		
1966	Group stage	(Venezuela) Deportivo Lara	8 March 1966	Estadio Nacional, Lima	1–0 (H)		
1966	Group stage	(Venezuela) Deportivo Italia	13 March 1966	Estadio Nacional, Lima	1–2 (H)		
1966	Group stage	(Argentina) Boca Juniors	18 March 1966	Estadio Camilo Cichero, Buenos Aires	0–2 (A)		
1966	Group stage	(Peru) Alianza Lima	23 March 1966	Estadio Nacional, Lima	1–1 (A)		
1967	Group stage	(Peru) Sport Boys	4 March 1967	Estadio Nacional, Lima	1–0 (H)		
1967	Group stage	(Venezuela) Deportivo Italia	11 March 1967	Estadio Nacional, Lima	3–0 (H)		
1967	Group stage	(Venezuela) Deportivo Galicia	15 March 1967	Estadio Nacional, Lima	0–2 (H)		
1967	Group stage	(Venezuela) Deportivo Galicia	25 March 1967	Estadio Nacional, Lima	2–0 (H)		
1967	Group stage	(Venezuela) Deportivo Italia	28 March 1967	Estadio Nacional, Lima	1–0 (H)		
1967	Group stage	(Brazil) Cruzeiro	28 April 1967	Belo Horizonte	1–4 (A)		
1967	Group stage	(Brazil) Cruzeiro	3 May 1967	Estadio Nacional, Lima	2–2 (H)		
1967	Group stage	(Peru) Sport Boys	16 May 1967	Estadio Nacional, Lima	1–0 (A)		
1967	Semifinal Group stage	(Chile) Colo-Colo	31 May 1967	Estadio Nacional, Lima	3–0 (H)		
1967	Semifinal Group stage	(Argentina) Racing Club	7 June 1967	Estadio Nacional, Lima	1–2 (H)		
1967	Semifinal Group stage	(Argentina) River Plate	13 June 1967	Estadio Monumental, Buenos Aires	1–0 (A)		
1967	Semifinal Group stage	(Argentina) Racing Club	15 June 1967	Estadio Juan Domingo Perón, Avellaneda	2–1 (A)		
1967	Semifinal Group stage	(Argentina) River Plate	29 June 1967	Estadio Nacional, Lima	2–2 (H)		
1967	Semifinal Group stage	(Chile) Colo-Colo	12 July 1967	Estadio Nacional, Santiago	1–0 (A)		
1967	Play-off round	(Argentina) Racing Club	18 July 1967	Estadio Nacional, Santiago	1–2 (A)		
1968	Group stage	(Bolivia) Always Ready	24 January 1968	Estadio Hernando Siles, La Paz	3–0 (A)		
1968	Group stage	(Bolivia) Jorge Wilstermann	28 January 1968	Estadio Félix Capriles, Cochabamba	0–0 (A)		
1968	Group stage	(Peru) Sporting Cristal	15 February 1968	Estadio Nacional, Lima	1–1 (H)		
1968	Group stage	(Bolivia) Jorge Wilstermann	22 February 1968	Estadio Nacional, Lima	5–1 (H)		
1968	Group stage	(Bolivia) Always Ready	27 February 1968	Estadio Nacional, Lima	6–0 (H)		
1968	Group stage	(Peru) Sporting Cristal	2 March 1968	Estadio Nacional, Lima	2–2 (A)		
1968	Second Group stage	(Argentina) Estudiantes	16 March 1968	Estadio Nacional, Lima	1–0 (H)		
1968	Second Group stage	(Argentina) Independiente	21 March 1968	Estadio Nacional, Lima	0–3 (H)		
1968	Second Group stage	(Argentina) Estudiantes	9 April 1968	Estadio Jorge Luis Hirschi, La Plata	0–1 (A)		
1968	Second Group stage	(Argentina) Independiente	11 April 1968	La Doble Visera, Avellaneda	0–3 (A)		
1970	Group stage	(Ecuador) LDU Quito	15 February 1970	Quito	0–2 (A)		
1970	Group stage	(Ecuador) América de Quito	22 February 1970	Quito	3–0 (A)		
1970	Group stage	(Peru) Defensor Arica	28 February 1970	Estadio Nacional, Lima	2–1 (H)		
1970	Group stage	(Ecuador) América de Quito	12 March 1970	Estadio Nacional, Lima	3–0 (H)		
1970	Group stage	(Ecuador) LDU Quito	16 March 1970	Estadio Nacional, Lima	2–0 (H)		
1970	Group stage	(Peru) Defensor Arica	20 March 1970	Estadio Nacional, Lima	1–1 (A)		
1970	Second Group stage	(Argentina) Boca Juniors	11 April 1970	Estadio Nacional, Lima	1–3 (H)		
1970	Second Group stage	(Argentina) River Plate	14 April 1970	Estadio Nacional, Lima	1–2 (H)		
1970	Second Group stage	(Argentina) Boca Juniors	22 April 1970	Estadio Camilo Cichero, Buenos Aires	0–1 (A)		
1970	Second Group stage	(Argentina) River Plate	25 April 1970	Estadio Monumental, Buenos Aires	3–5 (A)		
1971	Group stage	(Peru) Sporting Cristal	13 February 1971	Estadio Nacional, Lima	0–0 (A)		
1971	Group stage	(Argentina) Rosario Central	26 February 1971	Estadio Nacional, Lima	3–2 (H)		
1971	Group stage	(Argentina) Boca Juniors	4 March 1971	Estadio Nacional, Lima	0–0 (H)		
1971	Group stage	(Argentina) Rosario Central	16 March 1971	Estadio Gigante de Arroyito, Rosario	2–2 (A)		
1971	Group stage	(Argentina) Boca Juniors	25 March 1971	Not played	–		
1971	Group stage	(Peru) Sporting Cristal	31 May 1971	Estadio Nacional, Lima	3–0 (H)		
1971	Semifinal Group stage	(Brazil) Palmeiras	14 April 1971	Estadio Nacional, Lima	1–2 (H)		
1971	Semifinal Group stage	(Uruguay) Nacional	22 April 1971	Estadio Nacional, Lima	0–0 (H)		
1971	Semifinal Group stage	(Brazil) Palmeiras	6 May 1971	Pacaembu, São Paulo	0–3 (A)		
1971	Semifinal Group stage	(Uruguay) Nacional	11 May 1971	Estadio Centenario, Montevideo	0–3 (A)		
1972	Group stage	(Peru) Alianza Lima	25 February 1972	Estadio Nacional, Lima	2–1 (H)		
1972	Group stage	Universidad de Chile	7 March 1972	Estadio Nacional, Santiago	0–1 (A)		
1972	Group stage	(Chile) Unión San Felipe	11 March 1972	Estadio Nacional, Santiago	0–0 (A)		
1972	Group stage	(Peru) Alianza Lima	14 March 1972	Estadio Nacional, Lima	2–2 (H)		
1972	Group stage	(Chile) Unión San Felipe	21 March 1972	Estadio Nacional, Lima	3–1 (H)		
1972	Group stage	Universidad de Chile	26 March 1972	Estadio Nacional, Lima	2–1 (H)		
1972	Semifinal Group stage	(Uruguay) Peñarol	11 April 1972	Estadio Nacional, Lima	2–3 (H)		
1972	Semifinal Group stage	(Uruguay) Nacional	14 April 1972	Estadio Nacional, Lima	3–0 (H)		
1972	Semifinal Group stage	(Uruguay) Nacional	25 April 1972	Estadio Centenario, Montevideo	3–3 (A)		
1972	Semifinal Group stage	(Uruguay) Peñarol	3 May 1972	Estadio Centenario, Montevideo	1–1 (A)		
1972	Finals	(Argentina) Independiente	17 May 1972	Estadio Nacional, Lima	0–0 (H)	1–2	
1972	Finals	(Argentina) Independiente	24 May 1972	La Doble Visera, Avellaneda	1–2 (A)	1–2	
1973	Group stage	(Peru) Sporting Cristal	2 February 1973	Estadio Nacional, Lima	2–2 (A)		
1973	Group stage	(Paraguay) Olimpia	14 February 1973	Estadio Nacional, Lima	2–1 (H)		
1973	Group stage	(Paraguay) Cerro Porteño	19 February 1973	Estadio Nacional, Lima	0–2 (H)		
1973	Group stage	(Peru) Sporting Cristal	2 March 1973	Estadio Nacional, Lima	0–1 (H)		
1973	Group stage	(Paraguay) Olimpia	9 March 1973		1–3 (A)		
1973	Group stage	(Paraguay) Cerro Porteño	15 March 1973		0–1 (A)		
1975	Group stage	(Peru) Unión Huaral	8 March 1975	Estadio Nacional, Lima	1–1 (A)		
1975	Group stage	(Uruguay) Montevideo Wanderers	18 March 1975	Estadio Centenario, Montevideo	2–0 (A)		
1975	Group stage	(Uruguay) Peñarol	21 March 1975	Estadio Centenario, Montevideo	1–0 (A)		
1975	Group stage	(Peru) Unión Huaral	26 March 1975	Estadio Nacional, Lima	2–2 (H)		
1975	Group stage	(Uruguay) Montevideo Wanderers	1 April 1975	Estadio Nacional, Lima	3–1 (H)		
1975	Group stage	(Uruguay) Peñarol	6 April 1975	Estadio Nacional, Lima	3–2 (H)		
1975	Semifinal Group stage	(Ecuador) LDU Quito	4 May 1975	Quito	0–0 (A)		
1975	Semifinal Group stage	(Chile) Unión Española	16 May 1975	Santiago	1–2 (A)		
1975	Semifinal Group stage	(Ecuador) LDU Quito	22 May 1975	Estadio Nacional, Lima	2–1 (H)		
1975	Semifinal Group stage	(Chile) Unión Española	3 June 1975	Estadio Nacional, Lima	1–1 (H)		
1979	Group stage	(Peru) Alianza Lima	24 February 1979	Estadio Alejandro Villanueva, Lima	6–3 (A)		
1979	Group stage	(Brazil) Guarani	3 March 1979	Estadio Nacional, Lima	3–0 (H)		
1979	Group stage	(Brazil) Palmeiras	13 March 1979	Estadio Nacional, Lima	2–5 (H)		
1979	Group stage	(Peru) Alianza Lima	21 March 1979	Estadio Nacional, Lima	1–0 (H)		
1979	Group stage	(Brazil) Palmeiras	8 April 1979	Estádio do Pacaembu, São Paulo	2–1 (A)		
1979	Group stage	(Brazil) Guarani	11 April 1979		1–6 (A)		
1983	Group stage	(Peru) Alianza Lima	12 March 1983	Estadio Nacional, Lima	0–0 (H)		
1983	Group stage	(Colombia) Deportes Tolima	20 March 1983	Estadio Nacional, Lima	2–2 (H)		
1983	Group stage	(Colombia) América de Cali	27 March 1983	Estadio Nacional, Lima	1–1 (H)		
1983	Group stage	(Peru) Alianza Lima	13 April 1983	Estadio Alejandro Villanueva, Lima	1–2 (A)		
1983	Group stage	(Colombia) América de Cali	24 April 1983		0–2 (A)		
1983	Group stage	(Colombia) Deportes Tolima	27 April 1983		1–1 (A)		
1985	Group stage	(Peru) Sport Boys	15 May 1985	Estadio Nacional, Lima	2–0 (H)		
1985	Group stage	(Ecuador) Nueve de Octubre	6 July 1985	Guayaquil	0–1 (A)		
1985	Group stage	(Ecuador) El Nacional	14 July 1985	Quito	1–4 (A)		
1985	Group stage	(Peru) Sport Boys	19 July 1985	Estadio Nacional, Lima	4–0 (H)		
1985	Group stage	(Ecuador) El Nacional	2 August 1985	Estadio Nacional, Lima	1–1 (H)		
1985	Group stage	(Ecuador) Nueve de Octubre	6 August 1985	Not played	–		
1986	Group stage	(Peru) UTC	27 April 1986	Estadio Nacional, Lima	2–0 (H)		
1986	Group stage	(Bolivia) Jorge Wilstermann	10 May 1986	Bolivia	0–4 (A)		
1986	Group stage	(Bolivia) Bolívar	13 May 1986	Quito	0–4 (A)		
1986	Group stage	(Peru) UTC	18 May 1986	Estadio Héroes de San Ramón, Cajamarca	3–1 (A)		
1986	Group stage	(Bolivia) Bolívar	21 May 1986	Estadio Nacional, Lima	3–0 (H)		
1986	Group stage	(Bolivia) Jorge Wilstermann	25 May 1986	Estadio Nacional, Lima	1–2 (H)		
1988	Group stage	(Peru) Alianza Lima	1 July 1988	Estadio Nacional, Lima	2–0 (A)		
1988	Group stage	(Brazil) Guarani	12 July 1988	Estadio Nacional, Lima	1–1 (H)		
1988	Group stage	(Brazil) Sport Club do Recife	18 July 1988	Estadio Nacional, Lima	1–0 (H)		
1988	Group stage	(Peru) Alianza Lima	3 August 1988	Estadio Nacional, Lima	0–0 (H)		
1988	Group stage	(Brazil) Sport Club do Recife	23 August 1988	Estádio Ilha do Retiro, Recife	0–0 (A)		
1988	Group stage	(Brazil) Guarani	26 August 1988		1–1 (A)		
1988	Second round	(Colombia) América de Cali	7 September 1988	Estadio Pascual Guerrero, Cali	0–1	2–3 (A)	
1988	Second round	(Colombia) América de Cali	14 September 1988	Estadio Nacional, Lima	2–2 (H)	2–3 (A)	
1989	Group stage	(Peru) Sporting Cristal	12 February 1989	Estadio Nacional, Lima	0–1 (A)		
1989	Group stage	(Argentina) Boca Juniors	20 February 1989	Estadio Nacional, Lima	1–0 (H)		
1989	Group stage	(Argentina) Racing Club	28 February 1989	Estadio Nacional, Lima	2–1 (H)		
1989	Group stage	(Peru) Sporting Cristal	8 March 1989	Estadio Nacional, Lima	4–0 (H)		
1989	Group stage	(Argentina) Boca Juniors	14 March 1989	La Bombonera, Buenos Aires	0–2 (A)		
1989	Group stage	(Argentina) Racing Club	17 March 1989	Estadio Juan Domingo Perón, Avellaneda	0–2 (A)		
1989	Second round	(Brazil) Bahia	6 April 1989	Estadio Nacional, Lima	1–1	2–3	
1989	Second round	(Brazil) Bahia	13 April 1989	Estádio Fonte Nova, Salvador, Bahia	1–2	2–3	
1991	Group stage	(Peru) Sport Boys	20 February 1991	Estadio Nacional, Lima	2–0		
1991	Group stage	(Peru) Sport Boys	6 March 1991	Estadio Nacional, Lima	1–3		
1991	Group stage	(Paraguay) Atlético Colegiales	15 March 1991	Estadio Nacional, Lima	0–0		
1991	Group stage	(Paraguay) Cerro Porteño	22 March 1991	Estadio Nacional, Lima	1–1		
1991	Group stage	(Paraguay) Atlético Colegiales	2 April 1991		0–2		
1991	Group stage	(Paraguay) Cerro Porteño	5 April 1991		0–0		
1991	Round of 16	(Chile) Colo-Colo	17 April 1991	Estadio Nacional, Lima	0–0	1–2	
1991	Round of 16	(Chile) Colo-Colo	24 April 1991	Estadio Monumental, Santiago	1–2	1–2	
1993	Group stage	(Peru) Sporting Cristal	10 February 1993	Estadio Nacional, Lima	3–1		
1993	Group stage	(Venezuela) Caracas	19 February 1993	Estadio Nacional, Lima	4–1		
1993	Group stage	(Venezuela) Minervén	5 March 1993	Estadio Nacional, Lima	2–0		
1993	Group stage	(Peru) Sporting Cristal	10 March 1993	Estadio Nacional, Lima	2–2		
1993	Group stage	(Venezuela) Minervén	23 March 1993		2–2		
1993	Group stage	(Venezuela) Caracas	26 March 1993		2–1		
1993	Round of 16	(Ecuador) Barcelona	7 April 1993	Estadio Nacional, Lima	2–1	2–4	
1993	Round of 16	(Ecuador) Barcelona	14 April 1993	Estadio Isidro Romero Carbo, Guayaquil	0–3	2–4	
1994	Group stage	(Peru) Alianza Lima	2 March 1994	Estadio Nacional, Lima	0–1		
1994	Group stage	(Ecuador) Barcelona	8 March 1994	Estadio Isidro Romero Carbo, Guayaquil	0–0		
1994	Group stage	(Ecuador) Emelec	11 March 1994	Estadio George Capwell, Guayaquil	0–2		
1994	Group stage	(Peru) Alianza Lima	23 March 1994	Estadio Alejandro Villanueva, Lima	2–1		
1994	Group stage	(Ecuador) Barcelona	8 April 1994	Estadio Nacional, Lima	0–0		
1994	Group stage	(Ecuador) Emelec	15 March 1994	Estadio Nacional, Lima	2–1		
1994	Round of 16	(Colombia) Independiente Medellín	20 April 1994	Estadio Nacional, Lima	2–1	2–3	
1994	Round of 16	(Colombia) Independiente Medellín	27 April 1994	Medellín	0–2	2–3	
1996	Group stage	(Peru) Sporting Cristal	13 March 1996	Estadio Nacional, Lima	2–0		
1996	Group stage	(Uruguay) Peñarol	23 March 1996	Estadio Nacional, Lima	1–3		
1996	Group stage	(Uruguay) Defensor Sporting	30 March 1996	Estadio Nacional, Lima	1–1		
1996	Group stage	(Peru) Sporting Cristal	7 April 1996	Estadio Nacional, Lima	1–2		
1996	Group stage	(Uruguay) Defensor Sporting	12 April 1996	Estadio Centenario, Montevideo	0–2		
1996	Group stage	(Uruguay) Peñarol	16 April 1996	Estadio Centenario, Montevideo	2–1		
1999	Group stage	(Peru) Sporting Cristal	24 February 1999	Estadio Nacional, Lima	2–1		
1999	Group stage	(Chile) Colo-Colo	4 March 1999	Estadio Nacional, Lima	2–0		
1999	Group stage	(Chile) Universidad Católica	10 March 1999		0–1		
1999	Group stage	(Peru) Sporting Cristal	17 March 1999	Estadio Nacional, Lima	2–2		
1999	Group stage	(Chile) Colo-Colo	24 March 1999	Estadio Monumental, Santiago	0–1		
1999	Group stage	(Chile) Universidad Católica	8 April 1999	Estadio Nacional, Lima	1–3		
1999	Round of 16	(Argentina) Vélez Sársfield		Estadio Nacional, Lima	0–0	0–4	
1999	Round of 16	(Argentina) Vélez Sársfield		Estadio José Amalfitani, Buenos Aires	0–4	0–4	
2000	Group stage	(Argentina) San Lorenzo	22 February 2000	Estadio Pedro Bidegain, Buenos Aires	0–3		
2000	Group stage	(Paraguay) Cerro Porteño	2 March 2000	Estadio Nacional, Lima	1–0		
2000	Group stage	(Colombia) Junior de Barranquilla	9 March 2000	Estadio Metropolitano Roberto Meléndez, Barranquilla	0–1		
2000	Group stage	(Argentina) San Lorenzo	16 March 2000	Estadio Nacional, Lima	1–1		
2000	Group stage	(Paraguay) Cerro Porteño	21 March 2000		0–3		
2000	Group stage	(Colombia) Junior de Barranquilla	6 April 2000	Estadio Nacional, Lima	0–1		
2001	Group stage	(Argentina) Vélez Sársfield	6 February 2001	Estadio Monumental "U", Lima	0–3		
2001	Group stage	(Argentina) Rosario Central	21 February 2001	Estadio Gigante de Arroyito, Rosario	0–6		
2001	Group stage	(Colombia) Junior de Barranquilla	15 March 2001	Estadio Monumental "U", Lima	1–2		
2001	Group stage	(Argentina) Rosario Central	20 March 2001	Estadio Monumental "U", Lima	1–1		
2001	Group stage	(Argentina) Vélez Sársfield	5 April 2001	Estadio José Amalfitani, Buenos Aires	0–1		
2001	Group stage	(Colombia) Junior de Barranquilla	19 April 2001	Estadio Metropolitano Roberto Meléndez, Barranquilla	1–1		
2003	Group stage	(Argentina) Racing Club	18 February 2003	Estadio Monumental "U", Lima	1–1		
2003	Group stage	(Bolivia) Oriente Petrolero	26 February 2003	Estadio Monumental "U", Lima	2–0		
2003	Group stage	(Uruguay) Nacional	19 March 2003	Estadio Centenario, Montevideo	0–2		
2003	Group stage	(Argentina) Racing Club	25 March 2003	Estadio Juan Domingo Perón, Avellaneda	1–1		
2003	Group stage	(Bolivia) Oriente Petrolero	8 April 2003	Estadio Ramón Tahuichi Aguilera, Santa Cruz	2–2		
2003	Group stage	(Uruguay) Nacional	16 April 2003	Estadio Monumental "U", Lima	2–2		
2006	First round	(Paraguay) Nacional	24 January 2006	Estadio Defensores del Chaco, Asunción	2–2	(a) 2–2	
2006	First round	(Paraguay) Nacional	31 January 2006	Estadio Monumental "U", Lima	0–0	(a) 2–2	
2006	Group stage	(Uruguay) Rocha	7 February 2006	Estadio Mario Sobrero, Rocha	0–0		
2006	Group stage	(Ecuador) LDU Quito	16 February 2006	Estadio Monumental "U", Lima	1–2		
2006	Group stage	(Argentina) Vélez Sársfield	7 March 2006	Estadio Monumental "U", Lima	0–1		
2006	Group stage	(Argentina) Vélez Sársfield	14 March 2006	Estadio José Amalfitani, Buenos Aires	3–4		
2006	Group stage	(Ecuador) LDU Quito	6 April 2006	Estadio LDU, Quito	0–4		
2006	Group stage	(Uruguay) Rocha	18 April 2006	Estadio Monumental "U", Lima	1–1		
2009	Group stage	(Paraguay) Libertad	11 February 2009	Estadio Feliciano Cáceres, Luque	1–2		
2009	Group stage	(Argentina) San Lorenzo	19 February 2009	Estadio Monumental "U", Lima	1–0		
2009	Group stage	(Mexico) San Luis	10 March 2009	Estadio Monumental "U", Lima	0–0		
2009	Group stage	(Mexico) San Luis	18 March 2009	Estadio Alfonso Lastras	2–2		
2009	Group stage	(Paraguay) Libertad	7 April 2009	Estadio Monumental "U", Lima	2–1		
2009	Group stage	(Argentina) San Lorenzo	28 April 2009	Estadio Pedro Bidegain, Buenos Aires	0–2		
2010	Group stage	(Bolivia) Blooming	11 February 2010	Estadio Ramón Tahuichi Aguilera, Santa Cruz	2–1		
2010	Group stage	(Argentina) Lanús	17 February 2010	Estadio Monumental "U", Lima	2–0		
2010	Group stage	(Paraguay) Libertad	25 February 2010	Estadio Monumental "U", Lima	0–0		
2010	Group stage	(Paraguay) Libertad	23 March 2010	Estadio Defensores del Chaco, Asunción	1–1		
2010	Group stage	(Bolivia) Blooming	6 April 2010	Estadio Monumental "U", Lima	0–0		
2010	Group stage	(Argentina) Lanús	15 April 2010	Estadio Ciudad de Lanús, Lanús	0–0		
2010	Round of 16	(Brazil) São Paulo	28 April 2010	Estadio Monumental "U", Lima	0–0	0–0 (1–3 pso)	
2010	Round of 16	(Brazil) São Paulo	4 May 2010	Estádio do Morumbi, São Paulo	0–0	0–0 (1–3 pso)	
2014	Group stage	(Argentina) Vélez Sársfield	11 February 2014	Estadio Monumental "U", Lima	0–1		
2014	Group stage	(Bolivia) The Strongest	20 February 2014	Estadio Hernando Siles, La Paz	1–0		
2014	Group stage	(Brazil) Paranaense	13 March 2014	Estadio Monumental "U", Lima	0–1		
2014	Group stage	(Brazil) Paranaense	20 March 2014	Estadio Vila Capanema, Curitiba	3–0		
2014	Group stage	(Bolivia) The Strongest	27 March 2014	Estadio Monumental "U", Lima	3–3		
2014	Group stage	(Argentina) Vélez Sársfield	8 April 2014	Estadio José Amalfitani, Buenos Aires	1–0		

== Copa Sudamericana ==
Season	Stage	Opponent	Date	Venue	Score	Agg	Ref
2002	Preliminary round	(Peru) Alianza Lima	4 September 2002	Estadio Nacional, Lima	0–1	0–2	
2002	Preliminary round	(Peru) Alianza Lima	11 September 2002	Estadio Nacional, Lima	0–1	0–2	
2005	Preliminary round	(Peru) Alianza Atlético	10 August 2005	Estadio Monumental "U", Lima	1–1	2–2	
2005	Preliminary round	(Peru) Alianza Atlético	24 August 2005	Estadio Campeones del 36, Sullana	1–1	2–2	
2007	Preliminary round	(Colombia) Atlético Nacional	9 August 2007	Estadio Monumental "U", Lima	0–1	0–2	
2007	Preliminary round	(Colombia) Atlético Nacional	30 August 2007	Estadio Atanasio Girardot, Medellín	0–1	0–2	
2008	First round	(Ecuador) Deportivo Quito	30 July 2008	Estadio Monumental "U", Lima	0–0	1–2	
2008	First round	(Ecuador) Deportivo Quito	5 August 2008	Estadio Olímpico Atahualpa, Quito	1–2	1–2	
2011	Second round	(Venezuela) Deportivo Anzoátegui	1 September 2011	Estadio José Antonio Anzoátegui, Puerto la Cruz	2–0	4–1	
2011	Second round	(Venezuela) Deportivo Anzoátegui	14 September 2011	Estadio Monumental "U", Lima	2–1	4–1	
2011	Round of 16	(Argentina) Godoy Cruz	29 September 2011	Estadio Malvinas Argentinas, Mendoza	1–1	2–2 (3–2 pso)	
2011	Round of 16	(Argentina) Godoy Cruz	20 October 2011	Estadio Miguel Grau, Callao	1–1	2–2 (3–2 pso)	
2011	Quarter-finals	(Brazil) Vasco da Gama	2 November 2011	Estadio Nacional, Lima	2–0	4–5	
2011	Quarter-finals	(Brazil) Vasco da Gama	9 November 2011	Estádio São Januário, Rio de Janeiro	2–5	4–5	
2015	First round	(Venezuela) Deportivo Anzoátegui	11 August 2015	National Stadium, Lima	3–1	6–2	
2015	First round	(Venezuela) Deportivo Anzoátegui	20 August 2015	Estadio José Antonio Anzoátegui, Caracas	3–1	6–2	
2015	Second round	(Uruguay) Defensor Sporting	26 August 2015	Estadio Luis Franzini, Montevideo	0–3	0–4	
2015	Second round	(Uruguay) Defensor Sporting	15 September 2015	National Stadium, Lima	0–1	0–4	
2016	First stage	(Ecuador) Emelec	9 August 2016	National Stadium, Lima	0-3	1-6	
2016	First stage	(Ecuador) Emelec	16 August 2016	Estadio Christian Benítez Betancourt, Guayaquil	1-3	1-6	
2023	Preliminary round	(Peru) Cienciano	9 March 2023	Estadio Monumental, Lima	2-0	2-0	
2023	Group stage	(Argentina) Gimnasia y Esgrima	5 April 2023	Estadio Juan Carmelo Zerillo, La Plata	1-0		
2023	Group stage	(Brazil) Goias	20 April 2023	Estadio Monumental, Lima	2-2		
2023	Group stage	(Colombia) Santa Fe	4 May 2023	Estadio Monumental, Lima	2-0		
2023	Group stage	(Brazil) Goias	23 May 2023	Estádio da Serrinha, Goiânia	0-1		
2023	Group stage	(Colombia) Santa Fe	8 June 2023	Estadio El Campín, Bogotá	0-2		
2023	Group stage	(Argentina) Gimnasia y Esgrima	28 June 2023	Estadio Monumental, Lima	1-0		
2023	Knockout round play-offs	(Brazil) Corinthians	11 July 2023	Arena Corinthians, Sao Paulo	0-1	1-3	
2023	Knockout round play-offs	(Brazil) Corinthians	18 July 2023	Estadio Monumental, Lima	1-2	1-3	

== Copa Merconorte ==
Season	Stage	Opponent	Date	Venue	Score	Agg	Ref
1998	Group stage	(Colombia) Deportivo Cali	17 September 1998	Estadio Nacional, Lima	0–0 (H)	N/A	
1998	Group stage	(Ecuador) El Nacional	24 September 1998	Estadio Olímpico Atahualpa, Quito	1–1 (A)	N/A	
1998	Group stage	(Venezuela) Caracas	29 September 1998	Estadio Olímpico, Caracas	2–0 (A)	N/A	
1998	Group stage	(Colombia) Deportivo Cali	6 October 1998	Estadio Olímpico Pascual Guerrero, Cali	1–2 (A)	N/A	
1998	Group stage	(Ecuador) El Nacional	21 October 1998	Estadio Nacional, Lima	1–2 (H)	N/A	
1998	Group stage	(Venezuela) Caracas	4 November 1998	Estadio Nacional, Lima	1–3 (H)	N/A	
1999	Group stage	(Ecuador) El Nacional	29 July 1999	Estadio Olímpico Atahualpa, Quito	1–4 (A)	N/A	
1999	Group stage	(Colombia) América de Cali	19 August 1999	Estadio Nacional, Lima	1–2 (H)	N/A	
1999	Group stage	(Colombia) Atlético Nacional	8 September 1999	Estadio Nacional, Lima	2–2 (H)	N/A	
1999	Group stage	(Ecuador) El Nacional	30 September 1999	Estadio Nacional, Lima	2–0 (H)	N/A	
1999	Group stage	(Colombia) América de Cali	19 October 1999	Estadio Olímpico Pascual Guerrero, Cali	1–2 (A)	N/A	
1999	Group stage	(Colombia) Atlético Nacional	10 November 1999	Estadio Atanasio Girardot, Medellín	0–0 (A)	N/A	
2000	Group stage	(Mexico) Toluca	12 July 2000	Estadio Nemesio Díez, Toluca	1–4 (A)	N/A	
2000	Group stage	(Colombia) Millonarios	9 August 2000	Estadio Nacional, Lima	0–2 (H)	N/A	
2000	Group stage	(Ecuador) Barcelona	31 August 2000	Estadio Isidro Romero Carbo, Guayaquil	1–1 (A)	N/A	
2000	Group stage	(Mexico) Toluca	6 September 2000	Estadio Nacional, Lima	3–2 (H)	N/A	
2000	Group stage	(Colombia) Millonarios	27 September 2000	Estadio Nemesio Camacho, Bogotá	0–1 (A)	N/A	
2000	Group stage	(Ecuador) Barcelona	12 October 2000	Estadio Monumental "U", Lima	2–2 (H)	N/A	
2001	Group stage	(Colombia) Atlético Nacional	9 August 2001	Estadio Atanasio Girardot, Medellín	0–3 (A)	N/A	
2001	Group stage	(Bolivia) Blooming	22 August 2001	Estadio Ramón Tahuichi Aguilera, Santa Cruz	3–2 (A)	N/A	
2001	Group stage	(Ecuador) Emelec	13 September 2001	Estadio Monumental "U", Lima	0–0 (H)	N/A	
2001	Group stage	(Bolivia) Blooming	19 September 2001	Estadio Monumental "U", Lima	2–0 (H)	N/A	
2001	Group stage	(Ecuador) Emelec	26 September 2001	Estadio George Capwell, Guayaquil	0–1 (A)	N/A	
2001	Group stage	(Colombia) Atlético Nacional	10 October 2001	Estadio Monumental "U", Lima	2–1 (H)	N/A	

== Copa CONMEBOL ==
Season	Stage	Opponent	Date	Venue	Score	Agg
1992	Round of 16	(Ecuador) El Nacional		Estadio Nacional, Lima	1–3 (H)	2–6
1992	Round of 16	(Ecuador) El Nacional		Estadio Olímpico Atahualpa, Quito	1–3 (A)	2–6
1997	Round of 16	(Ecuador) Técnico Universitario		Estadio Nacional, Lima	3–0 (H)	3–0
1997	Round of 16	(Ecuador) Técnico Universitario		Estadio Bellavista, Ambato	0–0 (A)	3–0
1997	Quarter-finals	(Colombia) Deportes Tolima		Estadio Manuel Murillo Toro, Ibagué	0–1 (A)	2–1
1997	Quarter-finals	(Colombia) Deportes Tolima		Estadio Nacional, Lima	2–0 (H)	2–1
1997	Semi-finals	(Brazil) Atlético Mineiro		Estadio Nacional, Lima	0–2 (H)	0–6
1997	Semi-finals	(Brazil) Atlético Mineiro		Mineirão, Belo Horizonte	0–4 (A)	0–6
