= Nahuel Rivero =

Uruguayan footballer (born 1998)

Personal information
- Full name: Andrew Nahuel Rivero Coli
- Date of birth: 21 August 1998 (age 28)
- Place of birth: Maldonado, Uruguay
- Position: Attacking midfielder

Youth career
- Atenas

Senior career*
Years	Team	Apps	(Gls)
2016–2020	Atenas	11	(0)
2020	→ Rocha (loan)	1	(0)
- * Club domestic league appearances and goals as of 19:55, 17 May 2020 (UTC)

Andrew Nahuel Rivero Coli (born 21 August 1998) is an Uruguayan footballer who plays as an attacking midfielder.

== Career ==
=== Club career ===
Rivero is a product of Atenas. He got his official debut for Atenas in the Uruguayan Segunda División on 6 March 2016 against Rampla Juniors. Rivero was in the starting lineup, but was replaced at halftime. He made a total of eight appearances in that season. In the following two years, Rivero didn't play a single game for Atenas' first team, but was instead used on the reserve team.

He made his comeback in the Uruguayan Segunda División for Atenas in 2019, where he played three times. In February 2020, he was loaned out to fellow league club Rocha F.C. for the rest of 2020.
