= Estadio La Bombonera (Montevideo) =

Football stadium in Montevideo, Uruguay

Estadio "La Bombonera"
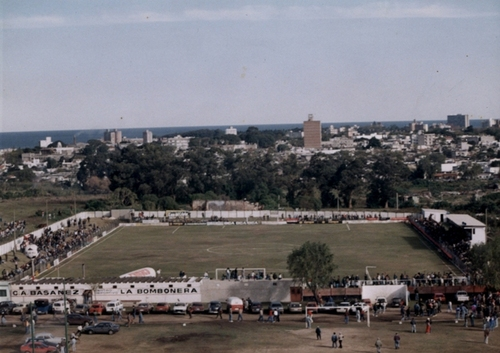
- Estadio La Bombonera
- Interactive map of Estadio "La Bombonera"
- Location: Malvín Norte, Montevideo, Uruguay
- Coordinates: 34°52′43.61″S 56°7′19.17″W
- Owner: Club Atlético Basáñez
- Capacity: 6,000
- Surface: Grass

Construction
- Built: 1981
- Opened: November 9, 1981

Tenant
- Club Atlético Basáñez

Estadio "La Bombonera" is a football stadium located in the Malvín Norte neighborhood of Montevideo, Uruguay. The stadium is owned and operated by Club Atlético Basáñez and serves as the club's home ground.

The stadium has a capacity of approximately 6,000 spectators and was opened on 9 November 1981.

== History ==
Estadio La Bombonera was constructed in 1981 as the home stadium of Club Atlético Basáñez, a football club based in Montevideo. Since its opening, it has hosted the club's home matches and has been part of the local football infrastructure in the Uruguayan capital.

The stadium's name, "La Bombonera", is shared with several football venues in Spanish-speaking countries, most famously Estadio Alberto J. Armando of Boca Juniors in Argentina.

== Facilities ==
The stadium features a natural grass playing surface and has a listed spectator capacity of 6,000. It is primarily designed for football matches and local sporting events involving Club Atlético Basáñez.

== Usage ==
Estadio La Bombonera is the home venue of Club Atlético Basáñez. The club has used the stadium for its competitive fixtures and training-related activities since the venue's opening.

== See also ==
- List of football stadiums in Uruguay
- Football in Uruguay
- Club Atlético Basáñez
