= Diego Rosa =

Diego Rosa may refer to:

- Diego Rosa (cyclist) (born 1989), Italian professional cyclist
- Diego Rosa (footballer, born 1989), Brazilian professional footballer
- Diego Rosa, Venetian architect, husband of Bice Lazzari
- Diego Rosa (footballer, born 1998), Uruguayan professional footballer
- Diego Rosa (footballer, born 2002), Brazilian professional footballer
