= Lucas de los Santos =

Uruguayan football player (born 2001)

Personal information
- Full name: Lucas Paul de los Santos Ruiz Díaz
- Date of birth: 26 July 2001 (age 25)
- Place of birth: Paysandú, Uruguay
- Height: 1.82 m (6 ft 0 in)
- Position: Attacking midfielder

Team information
- Current team: Defensor Sporting

Youth career
- –2021: Defensor Sporting

Senior career*
Years	Team	Apps	(Gls)
2021–2023	Defensor Sporting	61	(0)
2023–2025	Puebla	12	(0)
2024–2025	→ Celaya (loan)	35	(1)
2025–	Defensor Sporting	12	(0)
- * Club domestic league appearances and goals as of 30 December 2025

Lucas Paul de los Santos Ruiz Díaz (born 26 July 2001) is a Uruguayan professional footballer who plays as a midfielder for Defensor Sporting.

== Career ==
Lucas de los Santos played locally in his hometown of Paysandú before arriving in the capital to sign for Defensor Sporting and came through their youth ranks. He made his first team debut on 5 October, 2021 in the 1-0 defeat of Central Español in the Uruguayan Segunda División. Following their promotion in the 2021 promotion play offs, de los Santos made his debut in the Uruguayan Primera Division on 5 February, 2022 against Liverpool at the Estadio Luis Franzini.
