= Alejo Saravia =

Uruguayan footballer (born 1985)

Alejo Saravia Pacheco (born January 29, 1985) is a Uruguayan footballer who plays for Rocha in the Uruguayan Segunda División, as a second striker.

== Teams ==
- (Uruguay) Miramar Misiones 2007–08
- (Uruguay) Cerro Largo 2009
- (Uruguay) Bella Vista 2009–10
- (Uruguay) Rocha 2010–11
- (Uruguay) Progreso (A) 2011
- (Ecuador) Mushuc Runa 2012
- (Uruguay) Rocha 2013–present
