= Anderson Duarte =

Uruguayan football player (born 2004)

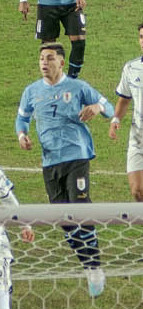

Personal information
- Full name: Anderson Nathael Duarte da Silva
- Date of birth: 23 March 2004 (age 22)
- Place of birth: Tacuarembó, Uruguay
- Height: 1.74 m (5 ft 9 in)
- Position: Forward

Team information
- Current team: Atlético San Luis (on loan from Toluca)
- Number: 17

Youth career
- Defensor Sporting

Senior career*
| Years | Team | Apps | (Gls) |
| 2021–2024 | Defensor Sporting | 62 | (14) |
| 2024– | Toluca | 7 | (1) |
| 2025 | → Mazatlán (loan) | 9 | (1) |
| 2026– | → Atlético San Luis (loan) | 0 | (0) |

International career
| 2018–2019 | Uruguay U15 | 30 | (10) |
| 2021–2023 | Uruguay U20 | 26 | (8) |
| 2024 | Uruguay U23 | 4 | (0) |
Medal record
Men's football
Representing Uruguay
FIFA U-20 World Cup
| Winner | 2023 Argentina |
South American U-20 Championship
| Runner-up | 2023 Colombia |
- * Club domestic league appearances and goals as of 29 March 2025

Anderson Nathael Duarte da Silva (born 23 March 2004) is a Uruguayan professional footballer who plays as a forward for Liga MX club Atlético San Luis, on loan from Toluca.

== Club career ==
=== Defensor Sporting ===
Duarte is a youth academy graduate of Defensor Sporting. He made his professional debut for the club on 10 November 2021 in a 2–0 league win against Uruguay Montevideo.

=== Toluca ===
In August 2024, Duarte joined Mexican club Toluca.

== International career ==
Duarte is a Uruguayan youth international. He has represented Uruguay at 2019 South American U-15 Championship. He was a part of the Uruguayan side that won the 2023 FIFA U-20 World Cup in Argentina.

In June 2023, Duarte received his first call-up to the senior team for friendlies against Nicaragua and Cuba. In January 2024, he was named in Uruguay's squad for the 2024 CONMEBOL Pre-Olympic Tournament.

== Career statistics ==
As of 7 December 2023

Appearances and goals by club, season and competition
| Club | Season | League | | | Cup | | Continental | | Other | | Other | |
| Club | Season | Division | Apps | Goals | Apps | Goals | Apps | Goals | Apps | Goals | Apps | Goals |
|---|---|---|---|---|---|---|---|---|---|---|---|---|
| Defensor Sporting | 2021 | Uruguayan Segunda División | 2 | 0 | — | | — | | 1 (Note: Appearance in Segunda División play-offs) | 0 | 3 | 0 |
| Defensor Sporting | 2022 | Uruguayan Primera División | 16 | 1 | 5 | 1 | — | | — | | 21 | 2 |
| Defensor Sporting | 2023 | Uruguayan Primera División | 23 | 7 | 1 | 1 | 1 (Note: Appearance in Copa Sudamericana) | 0 | 1 (Note: Appearance in Torneo Intermedio final) | 0 | 26 | 8 |
| Career total | | | 41 | 8 | 6 | 2 | 1 | 0 | 2 | 0 | 50 | 10 |

== Honours ==
Defensor Sporting

- Copa Uruguay: 2022, 2023

Uruguay U20

- FIFA U-20 World Cup: 2023
- South American U-20 Championship runner-up: 2023
