= Football in Uruguay =

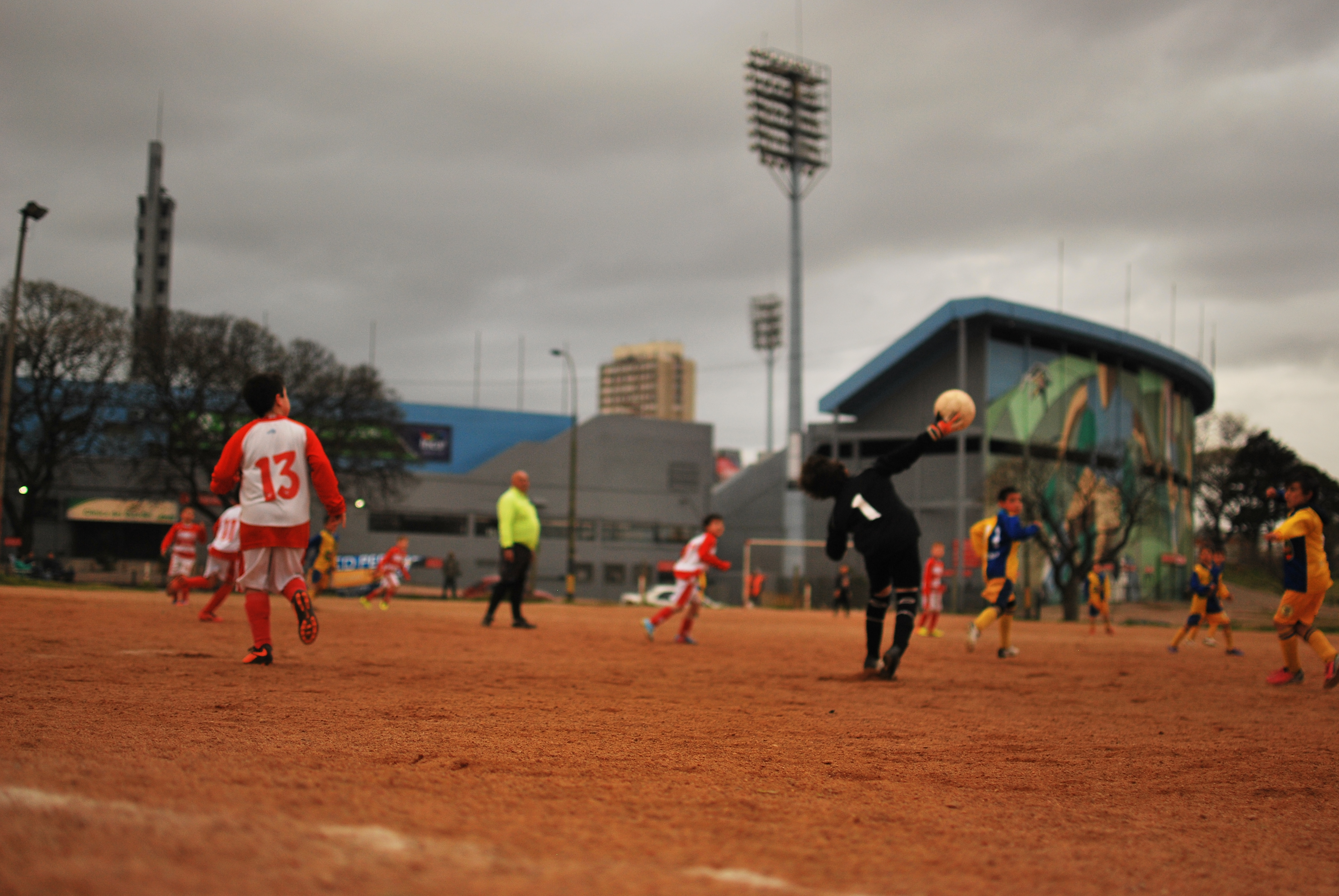
- A group of children playing football with the Estadio Centenario as background
- Country: Uruguay
- Governing body: Uruguayan Football Association
- National team: Uruguay
- First played: 1881; 145 years ago

National competitions
- FIFA World Cup; Confederations Cup; Copa América

Club competitions
- League: Primera División; Cups: Supercopa Uruguaya

International competitions
- FIFA Club World Cup; Copa Libertadores; Copa Sudamericana

Football in Uruguay stands as the most popular sport.

The Uruguay national football team has won two FIFA World Cup titles in addition to 15 Copa América titles, making them one of the most successful teams in South America. The national team won the first edition of the tournament in 1930, and won it again in 1950.

Also, the Uruguay national football team won the Olympic Games twice, in 1924 Summer Olympics and 1928 as well as the Copa de Oro de Campeones Mundiales ("Mundialito") in 1980–81.

== History ==
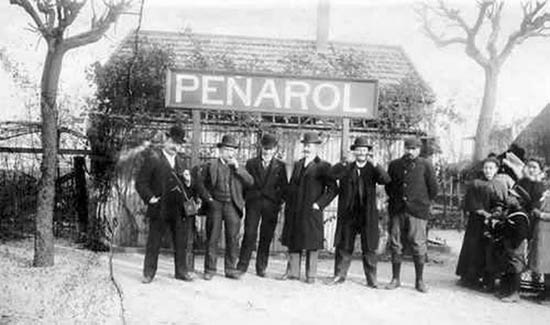
Managers and technical staff of the Central Uruguay Railway (CUR) at Peñarol station. Railway workers spread the practice of football in Uruguay

The sport was introduced by British immigrants and expatriates in the 19th century. Some references say that the game had been introduced in 1880, at the English High School by Henry Castle Ayre, born in Bedminster in March 1852.

The first recorded football match in Uruguay was played in 1881 between Montevideo Rowing Club (established in 1874) and Montevideo Cricket Club (1861), while Albion F.C. –established in Montevideo in 1891– was the first football club in the country. (Note: Another source states that Albion F.C. was founded by an English teacher at the William Leslie Poole School in 1882.)

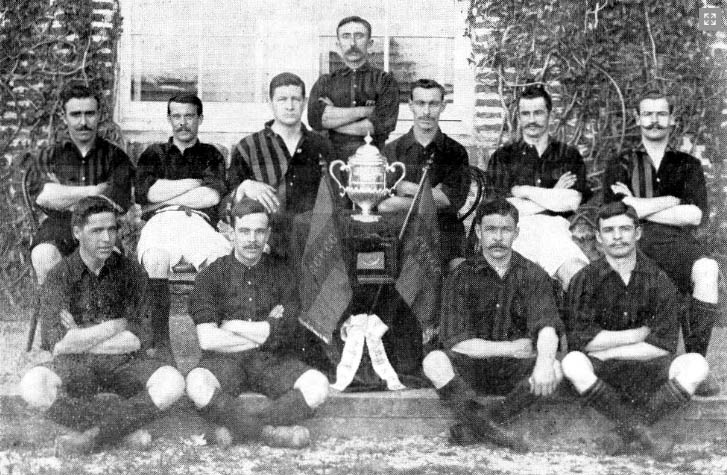
CURCC was founded by British immigrants in 1891, being predecessor of current C.A. Peñarol

British football clubs tours over South America contributed to the spread and development of football in Uruguay during the first years of the 20th century. The first club to tour was Southampton in 1904, followed by several teams (mainly from England although some Scotland clubs also visited South America) until 1929 with Chelsea being the last team to tour.

British teams were considered the best in the world by then, and some of them served as inspiration to establish football clubs in Uruguay and Argentina, helped by the immigration of British citizens that had arrived to work for British companies (mostly in railway construction). CURCC and Albion are some examples of clubs established by British immigrants to South America.

Uruguay is a country with a population that does not exceed more than three and a half million, and features a large concentration of professional football teams in the city of Montevideo. The two biggest club teams in the country's Primera División are Peñarol, the continuation of CURCC (Note: Controversy exists on the date of the founding of C.A. Peñarol. The club's official position assumes a change of name of CURCC (founded on September 28, 1891). On the other hand, some historians state that "C.A. Peñarol" was established on December 13, 1913.), and Nacional, founded in 1899 as a result of the fusion between Montevideo Football Club and Uruguay Athletic Club.

== Club football ==
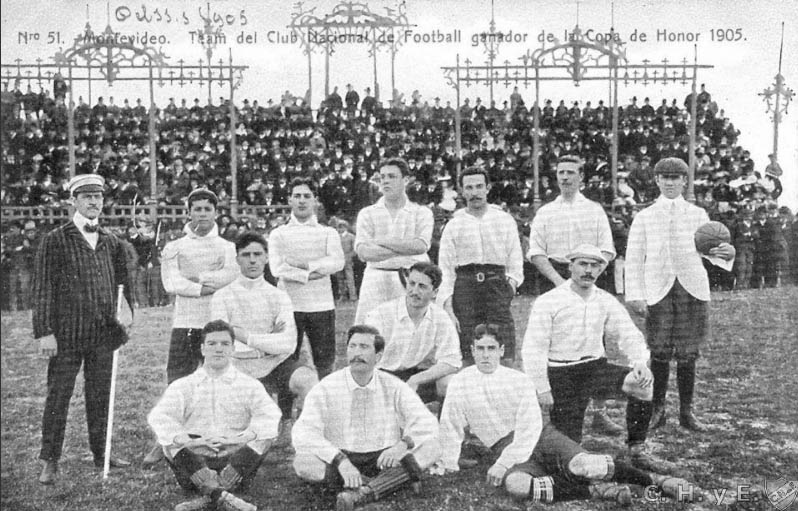
Club Nacional de Football was the first criollo team of Uruguay

Club football in Uruguay is dominated by two big Montevideo clubs, Peñarol and Nacional, which compete in the AUF Championships (Primera División). Peñarol have won the tournament 51 times (including titles by its predecessor, CURRC) and Nacional 49 times, since it began in 1900. Other teams winning the league have been Danubio (4 times), Defensor Sporting (4 times), River Plate F.C. (4 times), Montevideo Wanderers (3 times), Rampla Juniors (1 time), Bella Vista (1 time), Progreso (1 time), Central Español (1 time). Also, during 1923 and 1924, there existed another Uruguayan football league, the FUF (Uruguayan Football Federation). Said league only held two tournaments, however, won by Atlético Wanderers and Peñarol.

Nacional and Peñarol have each won the Intercontinental Cup three times and have also been successful in South American competition, with Nacional having won the Copa Interamericana twice, the Recopa Sudamericana once, and Copa Libertadores thrice, and Peñarol having conquered Copa Libertadores five times. In 2011, Peñarol reached the finals before falling to Brazilian side Santos.

Matches between Peñarol and Nacional are termed the Uruguayan Clásico, the longest running football derby outside Great Britain.

Most other clubs in top division are also from Montevideo. In the 2015–16 Uruguayan Primera División season, only two clubs, Plaza Colonia and Juventud de Las Piedras, came from outside the capital. As of 2023, Colonia, Maldonado and Cerro Largo are the only departments that are represented in Uruguay's First Division.

Danubio Football Club is a club of professional football of the Montevieo-Uruguay. It was founded on March 1, 1932 and it plays in the First Division. It obtained four Uruguayan Championships at the First Division in 1988, 2004, 2006, 2007, 2013 and 2014. At international competitions it reached the semi-final in the Copa Libertadores in 1989. In addition to that, according to the IFFHS Danubio is the third best Uruguayan club of the 20th century, just behind the two big Uruguayan teams. Its debut was in the Plaza de deportes en La Unión, which finished with a defeat scoring 1-0, but they did not give up themselves and it managed to turn itself a great club of the Uruguayan football. The team has 17 national titles and 17 official?. Its stadium was inaugurated on August 25, 1957.

Another notable first division team is Defensor Sporting Club, a professional club of Montevideo, Uruguay. It won four Uruguayan Championships, in 1976, 1987, 1991 and 2007-08. At international competitions it reached the semi-final in the Copa Libertadores in 2014. In addition to that, according to the IFFHS, Defensor Sporting was the best club of the world during September 2007.

Many Uruguayan footballers have been successful in European club football, including current players Luis Suárez and Edinson Cavani and also retired players such as Diego Forlán. Forlán had a successful career in Spain with Atlético Madrid, where he won both the European Golden Shoe and Pichichi Trophy twice. Suárez has had a successful career in England (with Liverpool) and Spain (with Barcelona), where he won the European Golden Shoe twice and the Pichichi Trophy.

== National teams ==
=== Men's ===
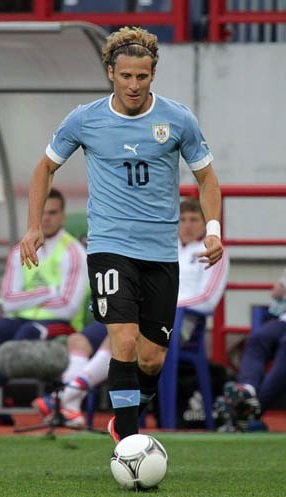
Diego Forlán with the Uruguay national team, winner of the Golden Ball in the 2010 FIFA World Cup

The Uruguay national team have won more international tournaments than any other country. In the Copa América, they are the most successful team, having won 15 titles. Uruguay won the first FIFA World Cup in 1930, defeating fierce rivals Argentina in the final. In 1950, they won their second World Cup, defeating Brazil in the Maracanã in the final. They have also won two Olympic gold medals in 1924 and 1928. Finally, they also won the 1980 Mundialito, a competition in Montevideo for all of the countries that had ever won the World Cup.

Between 1970 and 2010, they failed to reach the semi-finals of the World Cup until 2010, when they finished fourth.

=== Women's ===
The women's football national team of the AUF started in 1996 and the first official competition of the national team took place in 1998. They have played against national teams of South America and teams of other continents. Their most remarkable matches were against teams such as Argentina, Peru, Ecuador, and China. They have never participated in a World cup, but they have participated in the Southamerican championship. This team consists of players aged 16 to 30 years. Its more recent games were against Brazil, on March 8, Colombia on March 10 and Venezuela on March 12, all in the same year.

== Largest football stadiums in Uruguay ==
#	Stadium	Capacity	City	Home team(s)
1	Estadio Centenario	60,235	Montevideo	Uruguay
2	Estadio Campeón del Siglo	40,000	Montevideo	Club Atlético Peñarol
3	Estadio Gran Parque Central	34,000	Montevideo	Club Nacional de Football
4	Estadio Atilio Paiva Olivera	27,135	Rivera	
5	Estadio Luis Tróccoli	25,000	Montevideo	CA Cerro
6	Estadio Parque Artigas	25,000	Paysandú	Paysandú Bella Vista and Paysandú F.C.
7	Estadio Domingo Burgueño	22,000	Maldonado	Deportivo Maldonado
8	Estadio Luis Franzini	18,000	Montevideo	Defensor Sporting
9	Estadio José Nasazzi	15,000	Montevideo	Club Atlético Bella Vista
10	Estadio Charrúa	14,000	Montevideo	
11	Estadio Goyenola	12,000	Tacuarembó	Tacuarembó FC
12	Estadio Parque Artigas Las Piedras	12,000	Las Piedras	Juventud LP
13	Jardines del Hipódromo	11,018	Montevideo	Danubio
14	Estadio Viera	11,000	Montevideo	Montevideo Wanderers FC
15	Estadio Belvedere	10,000	Montevideo	Liverpool FC
16	Estadio Parque Capurro	10,000	Montevideo	Fénix

== See also ==
- Sport in Uruguay
- Uruguayan football league system
- Uruguayan Primera División
- List of football stadiums in Uruguay
