= Monegal =

Monegal is a Spanish surname that can be part or whole of a Spanish family name. People named Monegal include:

- Casiano Monegal, Uruguayan journalist, writer and poet
- Emir Rodríguez Monegal (1921–1985), Uruguayan literary critic, editor, writer
- Francisco Fábregas Monegal (born 1977), Spanish hockey midfielder

== Other uses ==
- Estadio Martínez Monegal, a multi-use stadium in Canelones, Uruguay.
- Monegal (company), a Spanish perfume brand
