= Cristian Barros =

Cristian Barros may refer to:

- Cristián Barros (born 1952), Chilean diplomat
- Cristian Barros (footballer) (born 2000), Uruguayan footballer
