= Gonzalo Sena =

Uruguayan footballer (born 1990)

Personal information
- Full name: Cristian Gonzalo Sena Seveso
- Date of birth: 15 June 1990 (age 36)
- Place of birth: Montevideo, Uruguay
- Height: 1.77 m (5 ft 10 in)
- Position: Left-back

Team information
- Current team: Racing Club
- Number: 16

Youth career
- 2008–2010: Liverpool

Senior career*
Years	Team	Apps	(Gls)
2010–2015	Liverpool	51	(6)
2015–2016	Rampla Juniors	23	(8)
2016–2017	Oriente Petrolero	16	(4)
2017–2019	Torque	57	(5)
2019	Progreso	0	(0)
2019–	Racing Club	5	(1)
- * Club domestic league appearances and goals as of 19:19, 20 August 2019 (UTC)

Cristian Gonzalo Sena Seveso (Note: In this Spanish name, the first or paternal surname is Sena and the second or maternal family name is Seveso.) (born 15 June 1990) is a Uruguayan footballer who plays as a defender for Racing Club de Montevideo in the Uruguayan Primera División.
