= Horacio Sequeira =

Uruguayan footballer (born 1995)

Personal information
- Full name: Hugo Horacio Sequeira Soza
- Date of birth: 30 September 1995 (age 31)
- Place of birth: Salto, Uruguay
- Height: 1.73 m (5 ft 8 in)
- Position: Forward

Team information
- Current team: Progreso
- Number: 9

Youth career
- –2013: Danubio

Senior career*
Years	Team	Apps	(Gls)
2013–2016	Danubio	22	(2)
2015	→ Fénix (loan)		
2016	Cerro Largo	12	(0)
2016–2017	River Plate	1	(0)
2017	Cerro Largo	23	(1)
2018	Rentistas	19	(4)
2020–2021	Rampla Juniors	37	(1)
2022	La Luz	21	(3)
2023	Chacaritas	8	(0)
2024–	Progreso	24	(2)

International career
2015	Uruguay U20	2	(0)
- * Club domestic league appearances and goals as of 14 September 2024

Hugo Horacio Sequeira Soza (born 30 September 1995) is an Uruguayan footballer who plays as a forward for Progreso.

== Career ==
Sequeira started his career playing with Danubio. He made his professional debut during the 2013–14 season.
