= Andrés Ferrari =

Uruguayan footballer (born 2003)

Personal information
- Full name: Andrés Martín Ferrari Malviera
- Date of birth: 3 January 2003 (age 23)
- Place of birth: Sauce, Uruguay
- Height: 1.84 m (6 ft 0 in)
- Position: Forward

Team information
- Current team: Sporting Gijón (on loan from Sint-Truiden)
- Number: 9

Youth career
- Peñarol
- Defensor Sporting

Senior career*
Years	Team	Apps	(Gls)
2022–2023	Defensor Sporting	24	(6)
2023–2024	Villarreal B	31	(2)
2024–2025	Villarreal	0	(0)
2024–2025	→ Sint-Truiden (loan)	27	(5)
2025–	Sint-Truiden	20	(3)
2026–	→ Sporting Gijón (loan)	7	(2)

International career
2021–2023	Uruguay U20	25	(7)
Medal record
Men's football
Representing Uruguay
FIFA U-20 World Cup
Winner	2023 Argentina
- * Club domestic league appearances and goals as of 15 March 2026

Andrés Martín Ferrari Malviera (born 3 January 2003) is a Uruguayan professional footballer who plays as a forward for Segunda División Sporting Gijón, on loan from Belgian Pro League club Sint-Truiden.

== Club career ==
Born in Sauce to a family of Italian descent, Ferrari started his career at the age of six, joining the futsal team Club BBC before switching to football with Sportivo Artigas the following year. He also played at the football school Profe Santos, before spending time alternating between the academies of Peñarol and Defensor Sporting. He eventually decided to continue with Defensor Sporting and went on to make his professional debut on 29 May 2022, in a 1–1 draw against Deportivo Maldonado.

On 6 April 2023, Ferrari joined Spanish club Villarreal on a five-year deal until July 2028.

On 26 August 2024, Ferrari joined Sint-Truiden in Belgium on a season-long loan, making his debut as substitute in a 3–0 away win at Beerschot on 21 September 2024, scoring a late equaliser the following week in a 1–1 draw at Cercle Brugge.

On 23 January 2026, Ferrari was loaned to Spanish club Sporting Gijón, until the end of the season. On 28 July, his loan was extended for a further year.

== International career ==
Ferrari is a Uruguay youth international. In July 2022, he was included in Uruguay's squad for that year's COTIF Tournament.

In May 2023, he was named in Uruguay's squad for the 2023 FIFA U-20 World Cup, as La Celeste eventually won the tournament.

== Personal life ==
On 21 June 2023, he married his long-time girlfriend Valentina Olivera in Montevideo.

== Honours ==
Defensor Sporting

- Copa Uruguay: 2022

Uruguay U20

- FIFA U-20 World Cup: 2023

Individual

- Copa Uruguay top scorer: 2022
