= Matías Abaldo =

Uruguayan footballer (born 2004)

Personal information
- Full name: Matías Ezequiel Abaldo Menyou
- Date of birth: 2 April 2004 (age 22)
- Place of birth: Montevideo, Uruguay
- Height: 1.72 m (5 ft 8 in)
- Position: Right winger

Team information
- Current team: Independiente (on loan from Defensor Sporting)
- Number: 19

Youth career
- Defensor Sporting

Senior career*
Years	Team	Apps	(Gls)
2021–2024	Defensor Sporting	38	(2)
2023–2024	→ Gimnasia LP (loan)	25	(5)
2024–2025	Gimnasia LP	8	(0)
2025–	Defensor Sporting	19	(3)
2025–	→ Independiente (loan)	29	(6)

International career
2022–2023	Uruguay U20	22	(2)
2024	Uruguay U23	5	(1)
Medal record
Men's football
Representing Uruguay
FIFA U-20 World Cup
Winner	2023 Argentina
South American U-20 Championship
Runner-up	2023 Colombia
- * Club domestic league appearances and goals as of 17:45, 6 June 2026 (UTC)

Matías Ezequiel Abaldo Menyou (born 2 April 2004) is a Uruguayan professional footballer who plays as a right winger for Argentine Primera División club Independiente, on loan from Defensor Sporting.

== Club career ==
Abaldo is a youth academy graduate of Defensor Sporting. He made his professional debut for the club on 4 December 2021 in a 1–0 loss against Cerro. Three days later on 6 December, he scored his first goal for the club in a 3–0 win against Racing Montevideo.

In August 2023, Abaldo joined Argentine club Gimnasia LP on a loan deal until December 2024. His signing was made permanent by the club in July 2024.

Following mental health struggles, Abaldo returned to Defensor Sporting in February 2025 and signed a contract with the club until December 2027. On 6 August 2025, he moved back to Argentina by signing for Independiente on a one-year loan deal. He scored his first goal for Independiente on 1 November 2025 in a 3–0 win over Atlético Tucumán.

== International career ==
Abaldo was part of the Uruguayan side that won the 2023 FIFA U-20 World Cup. In January 2024, he was named in Uruguay's squad for the 2024 CONMEBOL Pre-Olympic Tournament.

In October 2024, Abaldo received his first call-up to the Uruguay national team.

== Career statistics ==
As of 13 November 2022

Appearances and goals by club, season and competition
Club	Season	League			Cup		Continental		Other		Other	
Club	Season	Division	Apps	Goals	Apps	Goals	Apps	Goals	Apps	Goals	Apps	Goals
Defensor Sporting	2021	Uruguayan Segunda División	0	0	—		—		3 (Note: Appearances in Segunda División playoffs.)	1	3	1
Defensor Sporting	2022	Uruguayan Primera División	25	0	4	1	—		—		29	1
Career total			25	0	4	1	0	0	3	1	32	1

== Honours ==
Defensor Sporting

- Copa Uruguay: 2022

Uruguay U20

- FIFA U-20 World Cup: 2023
- South American U-20 Championship runner-up: 2023

Individual

- Uruguayan Segunda División Best Young Player: 2021
