= Alejo Cruz =

Uruguayan football player (born 2000)

Personal information
- Full name: Alejo Cruz Techera
- Date of birth: 1 September 2000 (age 26)
- Place of birth: Montevideo, Uruguay
- Height: 1.70 m (5 ft 7 in)
- Position: Left winger

Team information
- Current team: Peñarol
- Number: 14

Youth career
- Peñarol

Senior career*
| Years | Team | Apps | (Gls) |
| 2021–2022 | Peñarol | 4 | (0) |
| 2021 | → Racing Montevideo (loan) | 20 | (7) |
| 2022–2023 | Albion | 11 | (1) |
| 2023 | → Danubio (loan) | 29 | (3) |
| 2024–2025 | Atlético Goianiense | 68 | (6) |
| 2025– | Peñarol | 0 | (0) |
- * Club domestic league appearances and goals as of 30 July 2025

Alejo Cruz Techera (born 1 September 2000) is a Uruguayan professional footballer who plays as a left winger for Uruguayan Primera División club Peñarol.

== Career ==
Cruz is a youth academy graduate of Peñarol. In April 2021, he joined Racing Montevideo on a season long loan deal. He made his professional debut on 2 June 2021 in a 1–0 league win against Uruguay Montevideo.

In July 2022, Cruz terminated his contract with Peñarol and joined Albion. On 28 December 2022, he joined Danubio on loan for the 2023 season. In January 2024, he joined newly promoted Campeonato Brasileiro Série A side Atlético Goianiense on a contract until December 2025. On 25 February 2024, he scored his first goal for the club in a 5–1 win against Goianésia.

On 30 July 2025, Cruz returned to Uruguayan football by re-joining his boyhood club Peñarol.

== Career statistics ==
As of 12 June 2022

Appearances and goals by club, season and competition
| Club | Season | League | | | Cup | | Continental | | Other | | Total | |
| Club | Season | Division | Apps | Goals | Apps | Goals | Apps | Goals | Apps | Goals | Apps | Goals |
|---|---|---|---|---|---|---|---|---|---|---|---|---|
| Peñarol | 2021 | Uruguayan Primera División | 0 | 0 | — | | 0 | 0 | 0 | 0 | 0 | 0 |
| Peñarol | 2022 | Uruguayan Primera División | 3 | 0 | 0 | 0 | 2 (Note: Appearances in Copa Libertadores.) | 0 | 1 (Note: Appearance in Supercopa Uruguaya.) | 0 | 6 | 0 |
| Peñarol | Total | | 3 | 0 | 0 | 0 | 2 | 0 | 1 | 0 | 6 | 0 |
| Racing Montevideo (loan) | 2021 | Uruguayan Segunda División | 20 | 7 | – | | – | | 4 (Note: Appearances in Championship play-offs.) | 1 | 24 | 8 |
| Career total | | | 23 | 7 | 0 | 0 | 2 | 0 | 5 | 1 | 30 | 8 |

== Honours ==
Peñarol

- Copa Uruguay: 2025
- Supercopa Uruguaya: 2022

Atlético Goianiense

- Campeonato Goiano: 2024
