= Gonzalo Camargo =

Uruguayan footballer (born 1991)

Personal information
- Full name: Gonzalo Daniel Camargo Pinto
- Date of birth: 16 February 1991 (age 35)
- Place of birth: Artigas, Uruguay
- Height: 1.73 m (5 ft 8 in)
- Position: Left-back

Team information
- Current team: Rampla Juniors
- Number: 33

Youth career
- –2015: Peñarol

Senior career*
Years	Team	Apps	(Gls)
2011–2012	→ Plaza Colonia (loan)		
2012–2013	→ Juventud (loan)	12	(1)
2013–2014	→ Rentistas (loan)	6	(0)
2014–2015	→ Rampla Juniors (loan)	0	(0)
2015	→ Cerrito (loan)	5	(0)
2015–2016	Boston River	20	(0)
2016–2018	Sud América	48	(2)
2018–2019	Danubio	29	(0)
2019	Racing Club	3	(0)
2019–2020	Venados	16	(1)
2020	Atenas	14	(1)
2021	Plaza Colonia	30	(2)
2022	Defensor Sporting	28	(0)
2023	Montevideo Wanderers	34	(0)
2024–	Rampla Juniors	18	(0)
- * Club domestic league appearances and goals as of 14 September 2024

Gonzalo Daniel Camargo Pinto (born 16 February 1991) is a Uruguayan professional footballer who plays as a left-back for Rampla Juniors.
