= Durazno F.C. =

Durazno FC
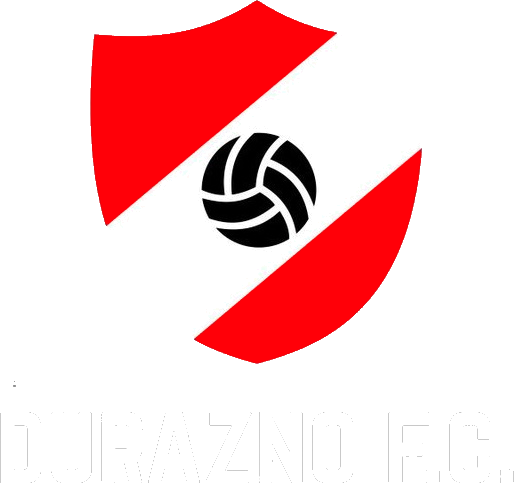
- Full name: Asociación Atlética Durazno Fútbol Club
- Nickname: Los Rojos del Yí
- Founded: November 22, 2005
- Ground: Estadio Municipal Silvestre; Octavio Landoni; Durazno, Uruguay
- Capacity: 8,000
- Chairman: Alejandro Naninni
- Manager: Rubens Navarro
- League: Disaffiliated
- 2010–11: 10th
| Home colours | Away colours |

Durazno Fútbol Club is a football club from Durazno in Uruguay.

== History ==
Asociación Atlética Durazno Fútbol Club was founded through the association of many clubs of the department of Durazno. Those associated clubs were: Central, Juvenil, Nacional, Molles, and Rampla.

The club were founded in 2005, making them one of the youngest teams in Uruguay. They made their debut in the 2nd division on September 16, 2006, with a surprising and important victory over El Tanque Sisley for 3–0.

On the 2008–09 season of the Uruguayan Segunda División, they got to the playoffs finals and failed to promote to the Top Division after losing 4–1 in the global by Atenas de San Carlos.

After the 2010–2011 season Durazno FC disappear from all competitions.
