= Edgar Martínez (footballer) =

Uruguayan footballer (born 1979)

Personal information
- Full name: Edgar Leonardo Martínez Fracchia
- Date of birth: 26 January 1979 (age 47)
- Place of birth: Montevideo, Uruguay
- Height: 1.86 m (6 ft 1 in)
- Position: Centre-back

Team information
- Current team: Rampla Juniors (manager)

Senior career*
Years	Team	Apps	(Gls)
1999–2003	Rampla Juniors		
2003–2006	Santos de Guápiles		
2006–2008	Montevideo Wanderers	57	(3)
2008	Deportivo Cali		
2009	Chongqing Lifan	12	(0)
2009–2010	Tacuarembó	23	(0)
2010–2011	Central Español	6	(0)
2011	Comunicaciones	20	(0)
2012–2017	Sud América	89	(2)
2017	Miami United		
2018	Central Español	10	(1)
2018–2019	Rampla Juniors	22	(1)
2022	La Luz	21	(2)
2023	Atenas de San Carlos	23	(0)

Managerial career
- 2020: Rampla Juniors (assistant)
- 2020–2021: Rampla Juniors
- 2024–: Rampla Juniors
- * Club domestic league appearances and goals

Edgar Leonardo Martínez Fracchia (born 26 January 1979) is a Uruguayan football manager and former player who played as a centre-back. He is the manager of Rampla Juniors.

== Managerial career ==
Martínez announced his retirement in June 2019, being an assistant of Edgardo Arias at Rampla Juniors before being himself named manager on 25 October 2020. He was later replaced by Rubén Silva.

Martínez stepped out of retirement in February 2022, after signing for La Luz, and subsequently played for Atenas de San Carlos before again hanging up his boots in 2023. On 10 April 2024, he was again appointed manager of Rampla.

== Personal life ==
Martínez's younger brother Williams was also a footballer and a centre-back. He died by suicide in 2021, aged 38.
