= Cristian Barros (footballer) =

Uruguayan footballer (born 2000)

Personal information
- Full name: Cristian Barros Mirabal
- Date of birth: April 9, 2000 (age 26)
- Place of birth: Montevideo, Uruguay
- Height: 1.70 m (5 ft 7 in)
- Position: Winger

Team information
- Current team: River Plate
- Number: 26

Youth career
- Defensor Sporting

Senior career*
Years	Team	Apps	(Gls)
2019–2022	Defensor Sporting	16	(1)
2020–2021	→ Universidad de Chile (loan)	7	(0)
2022	→ Albion (loan)	23	(1)
2023–	River Plate	10	(1)
- * Club domestic league appearances and goals as of 18:02, 28 September 2023 (UTC)

Cristian Barros Mirabal (born April 9, 2000) is a Uruguayan footballer who currently plays as a winger for Uruguayan Primera División side River Plate.

== Career ==
He made his professional debut playing for Defensor Sporting in an Uruguayan Primera División match against Racing de Montevideo on October 20, 2019.

In November 2020, he was loaned to Primera División club Universidad de Chile, being registered, at the beginning, in the youth team. He made his debut at the Chilean Primera División in a match against Deportes La Serena on December 17, 2020, reaching to play seven matches until the end of his loan.
