= Diego Rosa (footballer, born 1998) =

Uruguayan footballer

Personal information
- Full name: Diego Gabriel Rosa Lambach
- Date of birth: 27 August 1998 (age 28)
- Place of birth: Montevideo, Uruguay
- Height: 1.79 m (5 ft 10 in)
- Position: Midfielder

Team information
- Current team: Rampla Juniors
- Number: 14

Youth career
- –2019: Rampla Juniors

Senior career*
| Years | Team | Apps | (Gls) |
| 2019–2021 | Rampla Juniors | 25 | (0) |
| 2021–2022 | Uruguay Montevideo | 19 | (2) |
| 2023– | Rampla Juniors | 33 | (1) |
- * Club domestic league appearances and goals as of 14 September 2024

Diego Gabriel Rosa Lambach (born 27 August 1998) is a Uruguayan footballer who plays as a midfielder for Rampla Juniors in the Uruguayan Primera División.

== Career statistics ==
=== Club ===
As of match played 9 October 2020

Appearances and goals by club, season and competition
| Club | Season | League | | | Cup | | Other | | Total | |
| Club | Season | Division | Apps | Goals | Apps | Goals | Apps | Goals | Apps | Goals |
|---|---|---|---|---|---|---|---|---|---|---|
| Rampla Juniors | 2019 | Uruguayan Primera División | 19 | 0 | — | — | — | — | 19 | 0 |
| Rampla Juniors | 2020 | Uruguayan Segunda División | 6 | 0 | — | — | — | — | 6 | 0 |
| Rampla Juniors | Total | | 25 | 0 | — | — | — | — | 25 | 0 |
| Uruguay Montevideo | 2021 | Uruguayan Segunda División | 0 | 0 | — | — | — | — | 0 | 0 |
| Uruguay Montevideo | Total | | 0 | 0 | — | — | — | — | 0 | 0 |
| Career total | | | 25 | 0 | — | — | — | — | 25 | 0 |
