= Estadio Martínez Monegal =

Coordinates: 34°31′27.03″S 56°17′26.55″W

Estadio Martínez Monegal is a multi-use stadium in Canelones, Uruguay. It is currently used primarily for football matches and is the home ground of Juventud. Its capacity is 10,000 spectators.
