= Estadio Olímpico (Montevideo) =

Stadium in Montevideo, Uruguay

Spanish: Estadio Olímpico de Montevideo
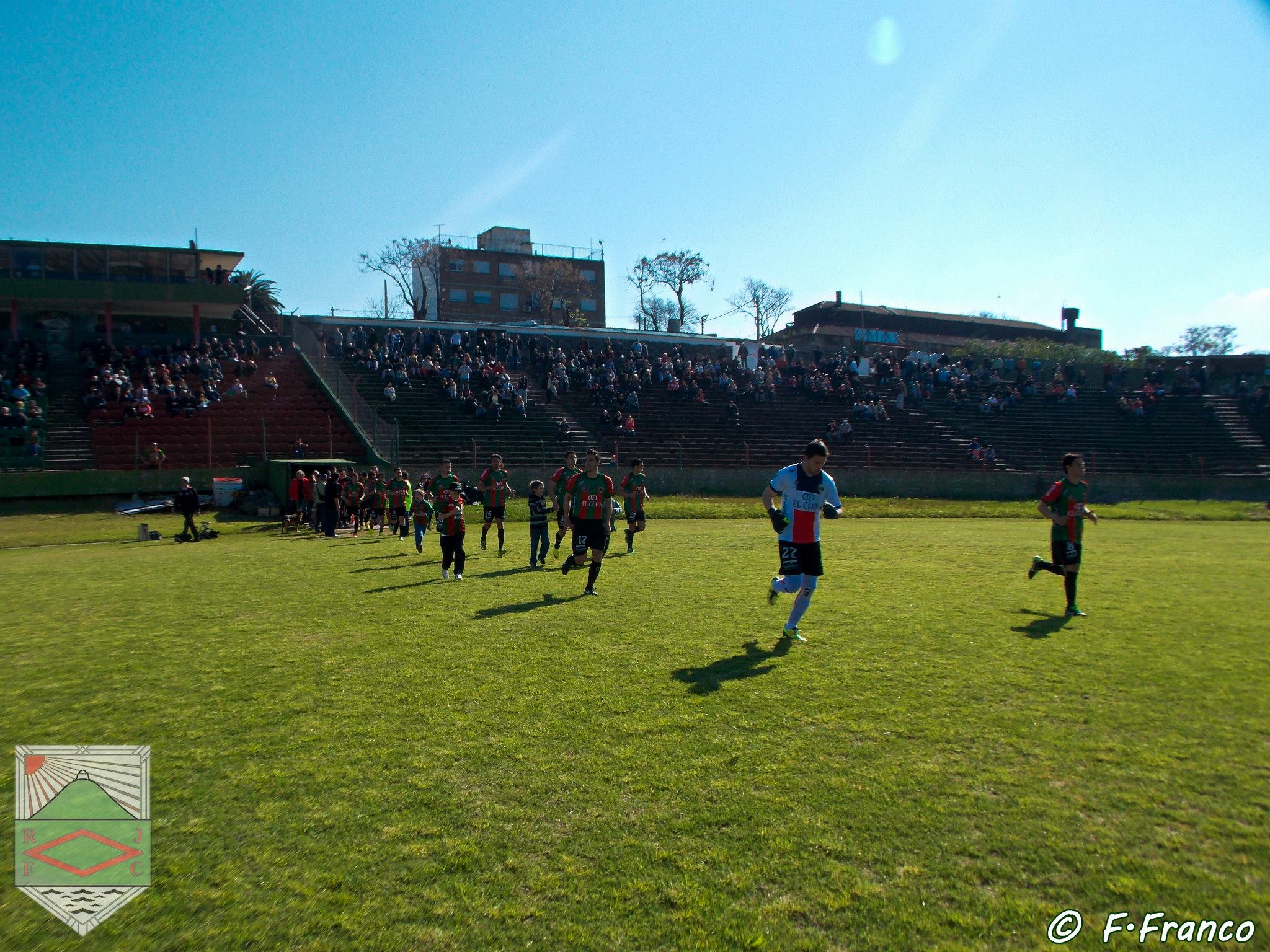
- Montevideo Olympic Stadium
- Interactive map of Spanish: Estadio Olímpico de Montevideo
- Location: Montevideo, Uruguay
- Coordinates: 34.893108°S 56.245413°W
- Owner: Rampla Juniors
- Capacity: 9,500
- Surface: grass
- Field size: 98 x 68 m

Construction
- Built: 1923
- Opened: December 30, 1923
- Architect: Carlos Vaia

Tenant
- Rampla Juniors

Estadio Olímpico is a multi-use stadium located in the neighbourhood of Cerro in Montevideo, Uruguay. It is currently used mostly for football matches. The stadium holds 9,500 people and was built in 1923. It is the home stadium of Rampla Juniors.
