= Estadio Complejo Rentistas =

Football stadium in Montevideo, Uruguay

Complejo Rentistas
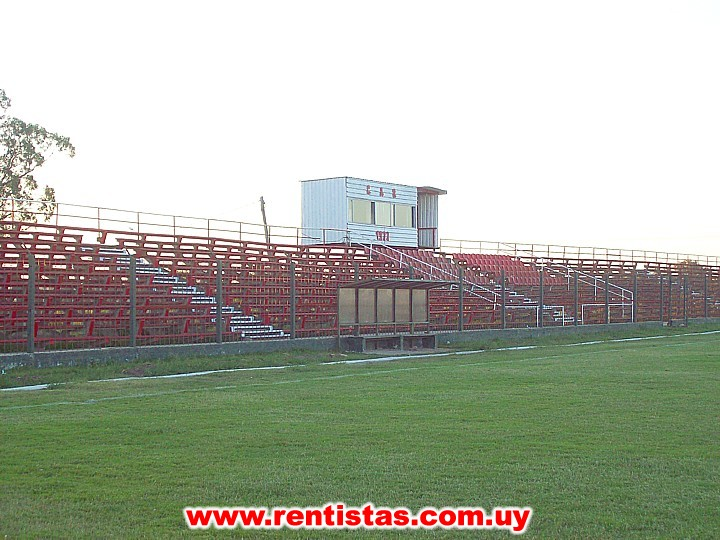
- Interactive map of Complejo Rentistas
- Location: Av. Pedro de Mendoza 6580; Montevideo, Uruguay
- Coordinates: 34.7763939°S 56.1658537°W
- Owner: C.A. Rentistas
- Capacity: 6,500
- Surface: Artificial grass

Construction
- Opened: August 2, 1998

Tenant
- C.A. Rentistas

Estadio Complejo Rentistas is a multi-use stadium in Montevideo, Uruguay. It is currently used primarily for football matches. It is the home stadium of Club Atlético Rentistas. The stadium holds 6,500 people and was opened in 1998.
