= Estadio Parque Artigas Las Piedras =

Stadium in Las Piedras, Uruguay

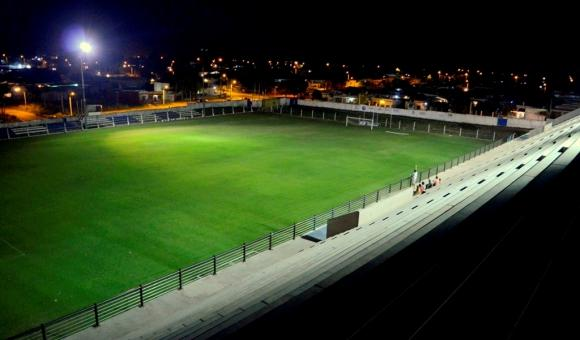
- Interactive map of Estadio Parque Artigas Las Piedras
- Coordinates: 34°43′28″S 56°12′9″W
- Owner: Canelones Department
- Capacity: 12,000
- Surface: grass

Construction
- Opened: 2002

Tenant
- Juventud de Las Piedras

Estadio Parque Artigas Las Piedras is a multi-use stadium in Las Piedras, Uruguay. It is currently used mostly for football matches. It is the home stadium of Juventud de Las Piedras The stadium holds 12,000 people and was built in 2002.
