= Estadio José Nasazzi =

- Parque Nasazzi
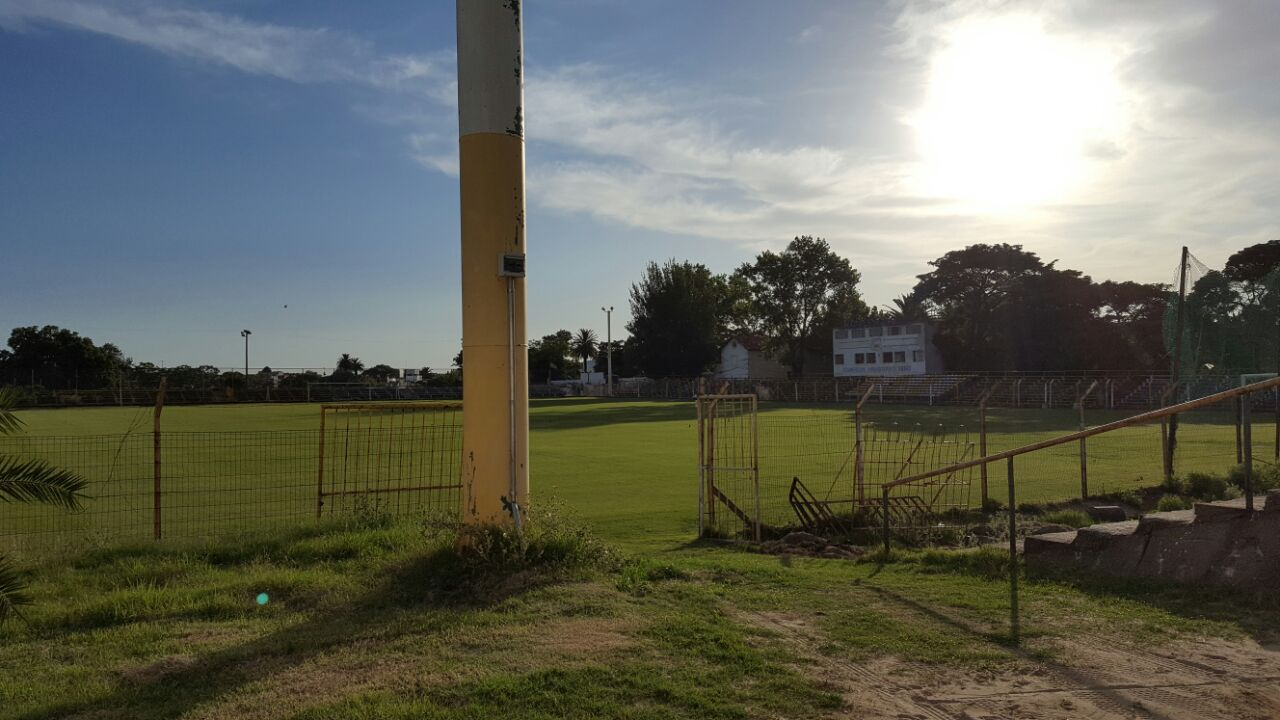
- Interactive map of Estadio José Nasazzi
- Location: Prado, Montevideo, Uruguay
- Coordinates: 34°51′41.49″S 56°12′32.52″W
- Capacity: 10,000
- Surface: grass

Construction
- Opened: 1929

Tenant
- C.A. Bella Vista

Estadio José Nasazzi is a multi-use stadium in Montevideo, Uruguay. It is currently used primarily for football matches. The stadium holds 10,000 people. It is the home stadium of C.A. Bella Vista.
