= Estadio Municipal Doctor Mario Sobrero =

Multi-use stadium in Rocha, Uruguay

- Interactive map of Estadio Municipal Doctor Mario Sobrero
- Location: Rocha, Uruguay.
- Coordinates: 34.486608°S 54.324539°W
- Owner: Rocha Department
- Capacity: 10,000
- Surface: grass

Construction
- Opened: 1955

Tenant
- Rocha F.C.

Estadio Municipal Doctor Mario Sobrero is a multi-use stadium in Rocha, Uruguay. It is currently used primarily for football matches. The stadium holds 8,000 people and was built in 1955. It is the home stadium of Rocha F.C.
