= Estadio Goyenola =

Multi-use stadium in Tacuarembó, Uruguay

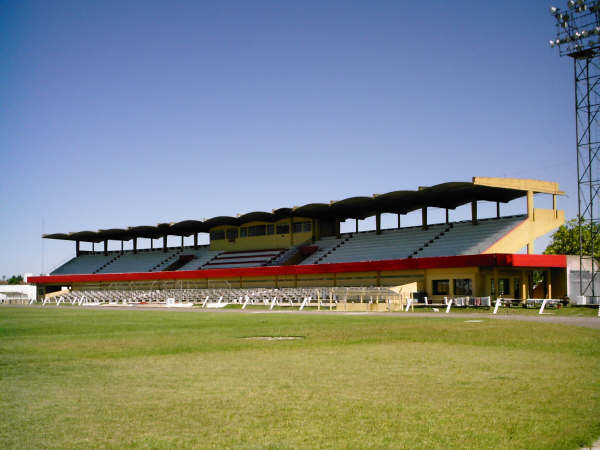
- Interactive map of Estadio Goyenola
- Full name: Estadio Ingeniero Raúl Goyenola
- Location: Tacuarembó, Uruguay
- Coordinates: 31°42′43″S 55°59′31″W
- Owner: Municipality of Tacuarembó
- Capacity: 12,000
- Surface: Grass

Construction
- Opened: May 18, 1955

Tenant
- Tacuarembó FC

Estadio Goyenola (Estadio Ingeniero Raúl Goyenola) is a multi-use stadium in Tacuarembó, Uruguay. It is currently used mostly for football matches and is the home stadium of Tacuarembó FC. The stadium holds 12,000 people and was built in 1955.
