= Rocha F.C. =

Association football club

Rocha
- Full name: Rocha Fútbol Club
- Nickname(s): Celeste del Este; Los de la Vaca; Primer Campeón del Interior; Rochense
- Founded: August 1, 1999; 25 years ago
- Ground: Estadio Municipal Doctor Mario Sobrero, Rocha, Uruguay
- Capacity: 10,000
- Chairman: Ruben Pereyra
- Coach: Gustavo Machado
- League: Primera División Amateur
- 2021: Segunda División, 12th (relegated)
Home colours	Away colours

The Rocha Fútbol Club is a Uruguayan football club from the city of Rocha, Uruguay. It was founded in 1999 and plays in the second professional division of Uruguay.

Rocha was the first club from outside Montevideo to have played in the Copa Libertadores, having competed in 2006. The club was established in 1999 and won the promotion to the Uruguayan top division in 2003.

In 2005, after capturing the Apertura title, the team notably did their lap of honour with their mascot, a cow owned by journalist Robert Santurio.

The Rocha FC kit is also the kit of the Rocha provincial team that plays in OFI (inner country football organization).

== Multiple Merge ==
Rocha F.C is the merge of 40 clubs from different cities in Rocha department:

- 12 from Rocha capital
- 5 from Chuy
- 4 from Velázquez
- 5 from Cebollatí
- 4 from La Coronilla
- 4 from Lazcano
- 6 from Castillos

== Titles ==
- Torneo Apertura: 1: 2005
- Segunda División Uruguay: 1: 2003

== Performance in CONMEBOL competitions ==
- Copa Libertadores: 1 appearance

2006: First Round

== Kit evolution ==
1999-03	2004–05	2006	2005 away	2006 away

== Current squad ==
As of 13 February 2022

Note: Flags indicate national team as defined under FIFA eligibility rules; some limited exceptions apply. Players may hold more than one non-FIFA nationality.

No.	Pos.	Nation	Player
—	GK	(Uruguay) URU	Martín Barlocco
—	GK	(Uruguay) URU	Marcos Donato
—	GK	(Uruguay) URU	Mauricio Fratta
–	DF	(Uruguay) URU	Federico Antúnez
–	DF	(Uruguay) URU	Martín Cardozo
—	DF	(Uruguay) URU	Santiago De Ávila
—	DF	(Uruguay) URU	Darío Ferreira
—	MF	(Uruguay) URU	Máximo Cabral
—	MF	(Uruguay) URU	Sebastián Cal
—	MF	(Uruguay) URU	Matías Fernández

No.	Pos.	Nation	Player
—	MF	(Uruguay) URU	Ricardo Lima
—	MF	(Colombia) COL	Daniel Rojano
—	MF	(Uruguay) URU	Mateo Schiaffino
—	FW	(Uruguay) URU	Facundo Nóbrega
—	FW	(Argentina) ARG	César Pereyra
—	FW	(Uruguay) URU	Marco Rossello
—	FW	(Colombia) COL	Edwin Salazar
—	FW	(Uruguay) URU	Jonathan Soto
