= Rampla Juniors =

Association football club in Uruguay

- Full name: Rampla Juniors Football Club
- Nicknames: Picapiedras; Friyis (until the middle of the 1960); Ramplenses
- Founded: 7 January 1914; 112 years ago
- Ground: Estadio Olímpico, Montevideo, Uruguay
- Capacity: 9,500
- Chairman: Daniel Bianchi
- Manager: Edgar Martínez
- League: Primera División Amateur
- 2025: Segunda División, 11th of 14 (relegated by average)
- Website: https://www.ramplajuniors.com/
Home colours	Away colours

Rampla Juniors Fútbol Club, commonly known as Rampla Juniors, is a Uruguayan football club based in Montevideo. Rampla won the Uruguayan championship in 1927. In their home stadium, the Rampla Juniors Fútbol Club had Estadio Olímpico, with 6,000 capacity, as its home stadium. Fans are nicknamed "The Flintstones", as they helped build the team's home stadium in the 1960s, which resembled a quarry.

== History ==
=== Origin and colours ===
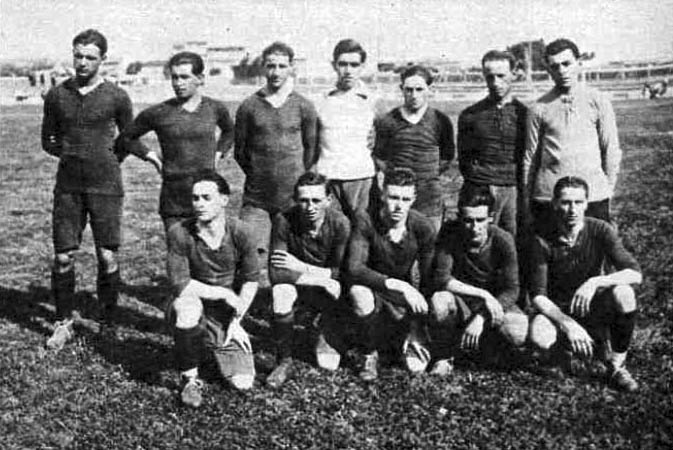
Team of Rampla Juniors that played in Buenos Aires in 1922

Rampla Juniors were founded in the Aduana area (also the birthplace of River Plate FC), then moved first to the Aguada neighborhood, and finally, around 1920, to the Cerro neighborhood. Their colors are taken from Fortaleza, a club that existed in the early years of Rampla's stint in the Cerro area. Another story of how they chose their colors is similar to how Boca Juniors supposedly got the idea for their kit colors from a Swedish flag on a ship. It is rumored that Rampla's founders took the red and green from an Italian flag on a ship that arrived in Montevideo Bay. It is also said that the basketball team CA Aguada (founded in 1922) took their colors from Rampla Juniors.

=== Early championships and games ===
In their home stadium, Rampla won the Uruguayan championship in 1927. Rampla in 1927 won the Uruguayan Primera División, the 1927 Squad was: Pedro Arispe (Captain), Pedro Aguirre, Enrique Ballestrero, Pedro Cabrera, Julio Nieto, José Magallanes, Juan Miguel Fermín "Ruso" Labraga, Luis Gaitán, Conrado Haeberli, Vital Ruffatti and Conrado Bidegain.

Rampla was once called the third "big" (meaning popular or best) of Uruguay's clubs, Nacional and Peñarol being first and second, due to the huge number of followers and positive results.

In its early days, Rampla Juniors had strong ties with the meat packing industries that forged the neighborhood that it represents, notably the Chicago companies Swift and Armour. From those companies' workforces came several important players to Rampla Juniors. Until the mid-1960s Ramplas' supporters were known as Friyis, as the sound resembled fridges (from the meat packing industries).

Fans are nicknamed "The Flintstones", as they helped build the team's home stadium during the 1964 and 1966 construction, which resembled a quarry. In 1966, the stadium had received its name.

In the 1980s, the club replaced the stadium's old wooden stands with new ones made with concrete. Supporters helped break stones for the restoration, hence their new nickname, the Picapiedras (stone breakers).

In 2007, Rampla finished tied in 2nd place with Danubio in the Uruguayan 1st division. Their team record was (9 wins, 4 draws, and 2 losses, in 15 games).

=== Recent seasons ===
By 2009, the club was in political and financial difficulties. By 2015, Rampla was in debt around US$200,000. In 2016, trade unionist Juan Castillo was named the club's president, and new management was announced too. Castillo was soon replaced with Isabel Peña as president. In 2020, the club's debts were paid by businessman Edgard Parnas, in exchange for 20% of the club's ownership.

In 2019, the Rampla Juniors Fútbol Club continued to use Estadio Olímpico, with 6,000 capacity, as its home stadium. To play a promotion tournament, in August 2020, the team raised US$180,000 in six days, refinancing 50% of debt with players, and paying the other half to start in the Second Division (Uruguayan Segunda División). By 2020 December, Rampla Juniors beat Racing Club de Montevideo 3–0, and were in the final for promotion in the second division.

The team was actively playing the 2021 season by January 2021. In January 2021 the first final of the Second Professional Division was played between Rampla Juniors and team Sud América. Daniel Bianchi was named new president of the Rampla Juniors on Thursday, February 25, 2021. In June 2021 they played the Atenas de San Carlos, ending in a draw at 1-1. On June 16, 2021, they won against Villa Teresa 1–0, with a goal scored by Pablo Pereira. In July 2021, rival Cerro beat the Rampla Juniors 1–0 at Charrua Stadium, in the Liga de Ascenso Profesional. The game was the Villa Classic. In August 2021, the team Peñarol won the final against Rampla 4–1.

== Rivalries ==
Rampla Juniors's archrivals are Cerro, and as such, the second biggest rivalry in the country, the Villa Classic.

The annual derby between teams is high-profile.

== Current squad ==
Updated 14 August 2024 Note: Flags indicate national team as defined under FIFA eligibility rules; some limited exceptions apply. Players may hold more than one non-FIFA nationality.

No.	Pos.	Nation	Player
2	DF	URU	Jonathan Toledo
3	DF	ARG	Lautaro Centurión
4	DF	URU	Álvaro Gracés
5	MF	URU	Isaac Méndez
6	MF	URU	Facundo Ospitaleche
7	FW	URU	Lautaro Rinaldi
8	DF	URU	Germán Gabriel
10	MF	URU	Nicolás Mezquida
11	MF	URU	Gustavo Machado
12	GK	URU	Andrés Samurio
14	MF	URU	Diego Rosa
15	MF	URU	Juan Pablo Plada
16	FW	URU	Enrique Almeida
17	DF	URU	Federico Barrandeguy
18	MF	ARG	Tomás Adoryán (on loan from Banfield)

No.	Pos.	Nation	Player
19	FW	URU	Maximiliano Burruzo
20	MF	URU	Lucas Tamareo
21	MF	URU	Adrián Leites
22	FW	URU	Nicolás Dibble
23	DF	URU	Enrique Etcheverry
24	FW	URU	Lucas Bassadone
25	GK	URU	Maicol Vera
26	MF	ARG	Matías Núñez
28	MF	URU	Franco Casuriaga
30	MF	URU	Andrés Madruga (on loan from Peñarol)
32	DF	URU	Diego Arismendi
33	DF	URU	Gonzalo Camargo
—	DF	BRA	Lucas Peres (on loan from Bellinzona)
—	FW	ARG	Matías Pólvera (on loan from Huracán)

== Notable players ==
- (Uruguay) José María Piriz

== Managers ==
- (Uruguay) Héctor Castro
- (Uruguay) Pedro Cubilla
- (Uruguay) Fernando Morena
- (Uruguay) Claudio Techera
- (Argentina) (Uruguay) Juan Hohberg (late 1960s)
- (Uruguay) Hugo Bagnulo (1963–64), (1967)
- (Uruguay) José Sasía (1971)
- (Uruguay) Martín Lasarte (1996–97)
- (Uruguay) Rubén Israel (1999)
- (Uruguay) Gustavo Matosas (2005)
- (Uruguay) Ariel Krasouski (2005–06)
- (Uruguay) Álvaro Gutiérrez (2006)
- (Chile) Oscar del Solar (Jan 2007–April 7)
- (Uruguay) Luis López (2007–2008)
- (Uruguay) Eduardo del Capellán (July 2009–June 10)
- (Uruguay) Hugo Parga (June 2010 – Aug 2010)
- (Uruguay) Carlos Rodao (interim) (Aug 2010)
- (Uruguay) Jorge Giordano (Sept 2010–July 11)
- (Uruguay) Eduardo del Capellán (June 2011–Nov 11)
- (Uruguay) Fernando Araújo (Nov 2011–May 12)
- (Uruguay) Eduardo Favaro (2012)
- (Uruguay) Luis López (2012–2013)
- (Uruguay) Marcelo Saralegui (2014)
- (Uruguay) Jorge Barrios (2015)
- (Uruguay) Fernando Araújo (2016–2017)
- (Uruguay) Luis López (2017–2018)
- (Argentina) Julio César Toresani (2018–2019)
- (Uruguay) Rosario Martínez (2019–2025)

== Honours ==
=== National ===
- Uruguayan Primera División
  - Winners (1): 1927
- Torneo Competencia
  - Winners (2): 1950, 1955
- Torneo de Copa Alfredo Lois
  - Winners (1): 1969
- Torneo Cuadrangular
  - Winners (1): 1953
- Segunda División Uruguay
  - Winners (4): 1944, 1980, 1992, 2015–16
- Divisional Intermedia
  - Winners (1): 1921
