= Estadio Luis Franzini =

Football stadium in Montevideo, Uruguay

- Nuevo Estadio Luis Franzini
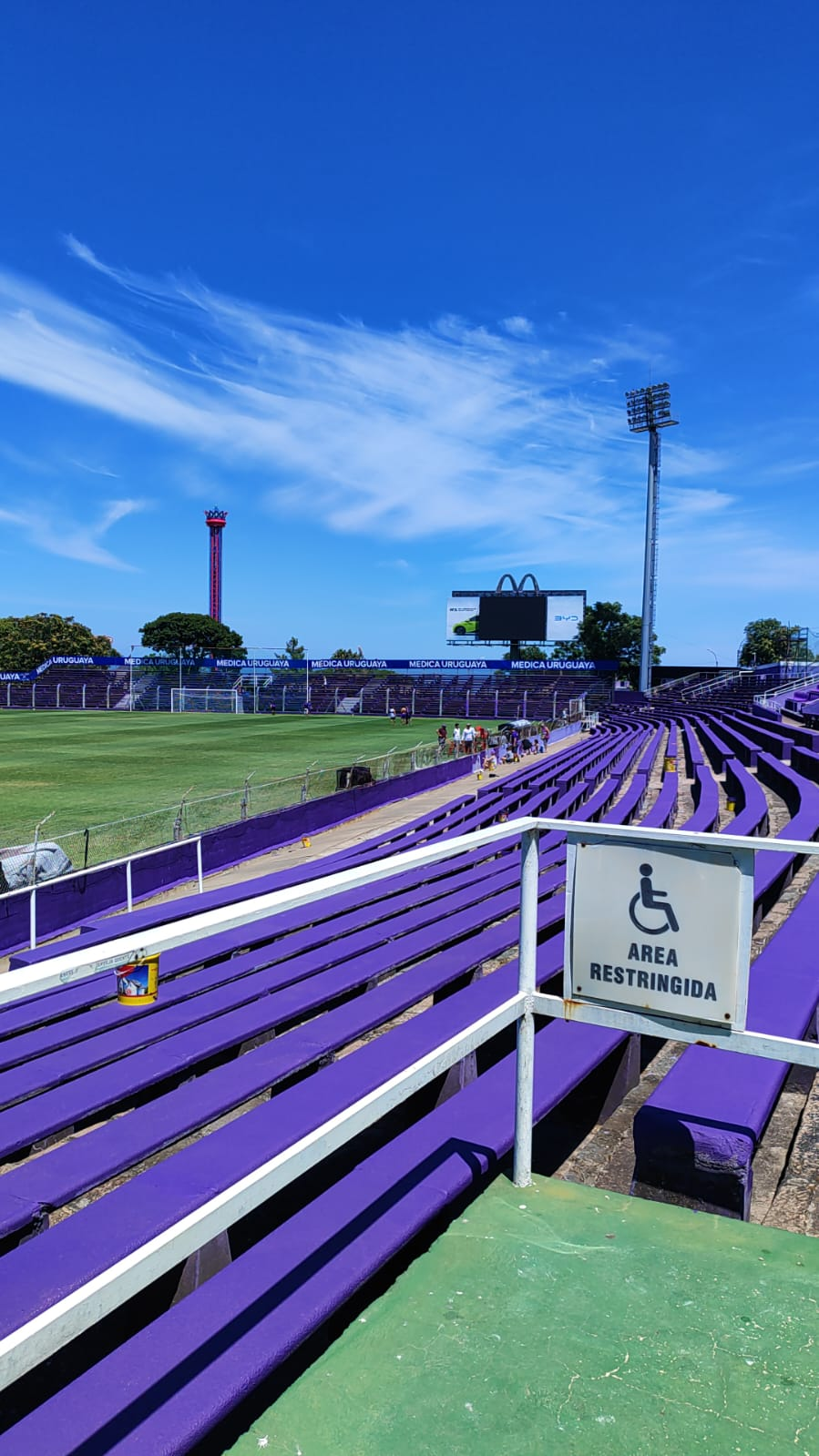
- Interactive map of Estadio Luis Franzini
- Location: Parque Rodó, Montevideo, Uruguay
- Coordinates: 34°55′0″S 56°10′0″W
- Capacity: 16,000
- Surface: grass

Construction
- Opened: 1963
- Renovated: 1999

Tenant
- Defensor Sporting

The Estadio Luis Franzini (or Luis Franzini Stadium) is an outdoor football stadium located in Montevideo, Uruguay. The stadium's maximum capacity is 16,000 people, and it is the home ground of Defensor Sporting.

Opened in 1963, originally for Club Atlético Defensor. The stadium was closed during the 1997 season for renovations. It reopened on 16 August 1998 with the name Nuevo Estadio Luis Franzini. Renovations included a seating capacity increase and leveling of the playing area. Previously, the land sloped to the west, toward the Rio de la Plata.

Situated on municipal land on the Parque Rodo at the intersection of Herrera y Reissig and Sarmiento Streets, the Luis Franzini Stadium is named for the former president of the Uruguayan Soccer Commission (Comisión de Fútbol) and Defensor Sporting, Luis Franzini, who led the club for thirty three years.
