= 2026 Uruguayan Segunda División season =

Segunda División Profesional
- Season: 2026
- Dates: 13 March – 5 December 2026
- Champions: Plaza Colonia (2nd title)
- Promoted: Plaza Colonia; Rentistas
- Relegated: Cerrito; Uruguay Montevideo
- Matches: 229
- Goals: 529 (2.31 per match)
- Top goalscorer: Sergio Cortelezzi (14 goals)
- Biggest home win: Atenas 4–0 La Luz (14 June); Atenas 4–0 Fénix (25 October)
- Biggest away win: Atenas 1–4 Fénix (27 April); La Luz 2–5 Rentistas (1 August); Fénix 1–4 Plaza Colonia (16 August)
- Highest scoring: River Plate 6–4 Cerrito (14 June)
- All statistics correct as of 18 November 2026.

The 2026 Uruguayan Segunda División season is the 119th season of the Uruguayan Segunda División, the second division championship of football in Uruguay. The season, which was named Elías Zumar, started on 14 March and will end on 5 December 2026.

A total of 14 teams competed in the season; the top two teams and the winner of the promotion play-offs will be promoted to the Liga AUF Uruguaya at the end of the season. The fixture draw for the season was held on 26 February 2026.

Plaza Colonia were the champions, winning their second Segunda División title and earning promotion to the top flight with one match in hand after a ruling awarding them the three points from their away match against Oriental was upheld by the Appeals Committee of the Uruguayan Football Association on 6 November 2026. Rentistas were also promoted as season runners-up, clinching promotion on the final matchday of the regular stage after beating Plaza Colonia 1–0 away on 12 November 2026.

== Teams ==
Locations of the 2026 season teams outside Montevideo.
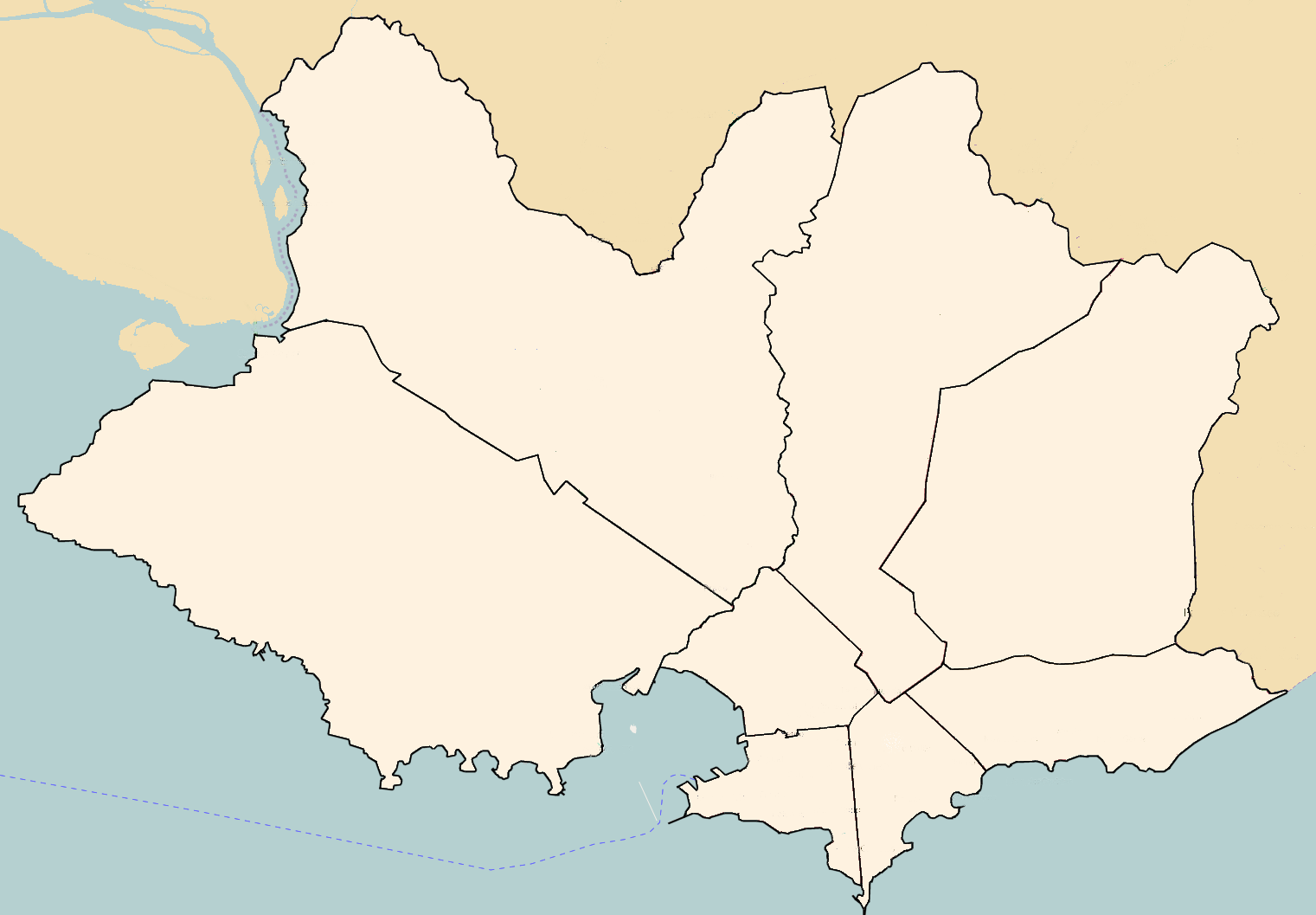
Locations of the 2026 Segunda División teams within Montevideo.

Fourteen teams take part in the season, nine of them returning from the previous edition. Albion, Central Español, and Deportivo Maldonado, who promoted to the top flight at the end of the previous Segunda División season, were replaced in this season by Plaza Colonia, River Plate, and Miramar Misiones, relegated from Liga AUF Uruguaya. On the other hand, Rampla Juniors and Artigas, relegated from Segunda División in the previous season, were replaced by the 2025 Primera División Amateur champions Paysandú and runners-up Huracán.

=== Club information ===
Club	City	Home stadium (Note: The stadiums owned by Colón, Huracán, Miramar Misiones and Oriental do not meet the requirements to host league games. On the other hand, La Luz do not own a stadium.)	Capacity
Atenas	San Carlos	Ateniense	6,000
Cerrito	Montevideo	Parque Maracaná	8,000
Colón	Montevideo	Parque Palermo	6,500
Fénix	Montevideo	Parque Capurro	10,000
Huracán	Montevideo	Parque Palermo	6,500
La Luz	Montevideo	Parque Palermo	6,500
Miramar Misiones	Montevideo	Charrúa	14,000
Oriental	La Paz	Parque Palermo	6,500
Paysandú	Paysandú	Parque Artigas	25,000
Plaza Colonia	Colonia	Juan Gaspar Prandi	4,500
Rentistas	Montevideo	Complejo Rentistas	10,600
River Plate	Montevideo	Parque Federico Omar Saroldi	6,000
Tacuarembó	Tacuarembó	Raúl Goyenola	12,000
Uruguay Montevideo	Montevideo	Parque ANCAP	3,000

== Torneo Competencia ==
The Torneo Competencia, named Mario Sanseverino, was the first stage of the tournament. The 14 participating teams were divided into two groups of seven where they played each one of the teams in their group under a single round-robin format. The winners of each group advanced to the final, with the winner being assured of a berth into the promotion play-offs.

Fénix won the tournament, defeating Oriental 1–0 in the final.

=== Serie A ===
Pos	Team	Pld	W	D	L	GF	GA	GD	Pts	Qualification	FEN	HUR	URU	CER	LLU	ATE	TAC
1	Fénix	6	3	2	1	13	7	+6	11	Advance to Final	—	—	—	4–1	0–0	—	3–2
2	Huracán	6	2	4	0	9	6	+3	10		2–1	—	—	1–1	—	1–1	—
3	Uruguay Montevideo	6	2	3	1	7	5	+2	9		1–1	1–1	—	—	—	—	1–1
4	Cerrito	6	2	3	1	8	8	0	9		—	—	2–1	—	0–0	3–1	—
5	La Luz	6	1	4	1	5	6	−1	7		—	2–2	0–2	—	—	2–1	—
6	Atenas	6	1	1	4	5	11	−6	4		1–4	—	0–1	—	—	—	1–0
7	Tacuarembó	6	0	3	3	5	9	−4	3		—	0–2	—	1–1	1–1	—	—

Source: Soccerway
Legend: Blue = home team win; Yellow = draw; Red = away team win.
Rules for classification: 1) Points, 2) Goal difference, 3) Goals scored, 4) Head-to-head points, 5) Head-to-head goal difference, 6) Head-to-head goals scored.

=== Serie B ===
Pos	Team	Pld	W	D	L	GF	GA	GD	Pts	Qualification	ORI	PCO	COL	REN	MIM	PAY	RIV
1	Oriental	6	4	1	1	8	5	+3	13	Advance to Final	—	—	0–0	—	2–1	1–0	—
2	Plaza Colonia	6	3	3	0	9	2	+7	12		2–0	—	—	—	—	1–1	3–0
3	Colón	6	2	3	1	8	5	+3	9		—	1–1	—	1–2	—	—	4–2
4	Rentistas	6	2	3	1	6	5	+1	9		1–2	0–0	—	—	1–1	—	—
5	Miramar Misiones	6	1	2	3	3	7	−4	5		—	0–2	0–0	—	—	—	1–0
6	Paysandú	6	1	1	4	4	7	−3	4		—	—	0–2	0–1	2–0	—	—
7	River Plate	6	1	1	4	6	13	−7	4		1–3	—	—	1–1	—	2–1	—

Source: Soccerway
Legend: Blue = home team win; Yellow = draw; Red = away team win.
Rules for classification: 1) Points, 2) Goal difference, 3) Goals scored, 4) Head-to-head points, 5) Head-to-head goal difference, 6) Head-to-head goals scored.

=== Final ===
2 May 2026
20:30 UTC−3

Fénix	1–0	Oriental
Paiva 85' (o.g.)	Report

Estadio Luis Franzini, Montevideo
Referee: Andrés Martínez

== Regular stage ==
In the regular stage, the 14 teams played each other twice under a double round-robin format for a total of 26 matches. Teams carried over their Torneo Competencia performances to this stage. The top two teams at the end of the regular stage were promoted to the Liga AUF Uruguaya, while the Torneo Competencia winners and the teams placing from third to fifth place advanced to the promotion play-offs to decide the last promoted team. The regular stage began on 8 May and ended on 14 November 2026.

=== Standings ===
Pos	Team	Pld	W	D	L	GF	GA	GD	Pts	Promotion or qualification
1	Plaza Colonia (Note: Plaza Colonia were awarded the three points of their away match against Oriental (and Oriental were deducted three points) after the latter team breached competition rules by fielding six foreign players, exceeding the quota of five.) (C, P)	32	13	11	8	40	28	+12	53	Promotion to Liga AUF Uruguaya
2	Rentistas (P)	32	14	10	8	41	32	+9	52	Promotion to Liga AUF Uruguaya
3	Atenas	32	15	6	11	41	34	+7	51	Advance to Promotion play-offs
4	Colón	32	14	9	9	38	32	+6	51	Advance to Promotion play-offs
5	Oriental	32	12	11	9	42	36	+6	44	Advance to Promotion play-offs
6	Huracán	32	11	11	10	36	39	−3	44	
7	La Luz	32	11	11	10	30	33	−3	44	
8	Cerrito	32	10	13	9	40	38	+2	43	
9	Fénix	32	10	12	10	41	38	+3	42	Advance to Promotion play-offs (Note: Fénix qualified for the promotion play-offs by winning the Torneo Competencia.)
10	Paysandú	32	11	6	15	38	41	−3	39	
11	River Plate	32	10	8	14	43	47	−4	38	
12	Miramar Misiones	32	9	11	12	32	39	−7	38	
13	Uruguay Montevideo	32	8	10	14	32	42	−10	34	
14	Tacuarembó	32	6	11	15	25	40	−15	29	

Source: Soccerway
Rules for classification: 1) Points, 2) Playoff series (only if needed to decide promotion), 3) Goal difference, 4) Goals for, 5) Head-to-head points, 6) Head-to-head goals scored, 7) Playoff game, in case two teams are still tied for first place.
(C) Champions; (P) Promoted

=== Results ===
Home \ Away	ATE	CER	COL	FEN	HUR	LLU	MIM	ORI	PAY	PCO	REN	RIV	TAC	URU
Atenas	—	0–0	4–1	4–0	0–0	4–0	1–1	1–0	3–2	0–0	1–3	3–2	2–0	2–1
Cerrito	2–1	—	0–1	1–1	2–0	1–2	1–0	1–1	1–2	1–0	2–2	1–1	2–1	3–0
Colón	1–0	1–0	—	1–1	3–0	2–1	1–3	0–0	2–3	0–1	0–1	2–1	1–0	1–0
Fénix	1–0	1–1	1–1	—	2–0	0–0	1–1	2–2	0–1	1–4	1–1	3–1	1–2	2–0
Huracán	1–0	2–1	0–2	0–0	—	1–1	2–1	3–2	3–2	1–2	1–2	2–0	2–1	1–3
La Luz	0–1	2–0	0–0	1–0	1–3	—	3–0	0–2	1–2	1–1	2–5	3–2	2–0	2–0
Miramar Misiones	1–1	1–0	0–1	1–1	0–1	0–1	—	2–2	1–0	1–1	1–1	1–1	1–1	1–0
Oriental	0–1	2–2	1–1	3–2	1–0	0–0	1–3	—	1–1	2–0	3–0	1–2	2–0	1–1
Paysandú	2–0	0–1	3–2	1–0	2–2	0–1	2–3	2–1	—	1–2	2–1	0–0	2–2	1–2
Plaza Colonia	1–2	1–3	1–1	0–1	0–0	1–0	3–0	3–1	1–1	—	0–1	2–1	1–1	1–0
Rentistas	3–0	0–0	0–2	2–1	2–1	2–0	1–0	0–2	1–2	1–1	—	1–2	0–1	1–0
River Plate	0–2	6–4	3–0	0–1	2–0	0–0	3–0	3–1	1–0	3–2	0–0	—	1–1	1–2
Tacuarembó	0–1	0–0	2–0	0–2	1–1	0–1	1–3	0–1	1–0	0–2	1–1	1–0	—	1–0
Uruguay Montevideo	1–2	2–2	1–3	3–2	0–0	0–0	1–3	1–1	1–0	2–0	1–3	1–1	2–2	—

Source: Soccerway
Legend: Blue = home team win; Yellow = draw; Red = away team win.

== Promotion play-offs ==
The teams placing from third to fifth place at the end of the regular season, along with the Torneo Competencia winners Fénix, will play the promotion play-offs to decide the third promoted team to the Liga AUF Uruguaya for the following season. These four teams played two double-legged semi-final matchups, with the winners contesting the finals over two legs.

=== Bracket ===
Semi-finals
Oriental	1	2	3
Colón	2	2	4
Fénix	1	1	2
Atenas	1	3	4

Finals
Colón
Atenas

=== Semi-finals ===
==== First leg ====
15 November 2026
16:30 UTC−3

Fénix	1–1	Atenas
Colmán 53'	Report	Suárez 50' (pen.)

Estadio Parque Capurro, Montevideo
Referee: Andrés Martínez

15 November 2026
20:30 UTC−3

Oriental	1–2	Colón
Franco 20'	Report	Varela 28'; Méndez 53'

Parque Palermo, Montevideo
Referee: Kevin Fontes

==== Second leg ====
18 November 2026
16:30 UTC−3

Atenas	3–1	Fénix
Medina 11'; Suárez 25' (pen.), 31'	Report	Ribas 85'

Estadio Ateniense, San Carlos
Referee: Bruno Sacarelo

Atenas won 4–2 on aggregate.

18 November 2026
19:30 UTC−3

Colón	2–2	Oriental
Quintana 84'; Espinosa 90'	Report	Galván 21'; Franco 71'

Parque Palermo, Montevideo
Referee: Leandro Lasso

Colón won 4–3 on aggregate.

=== Final ===
25 November 2026
18:00 UTC−3

Colón	v	Atenas

Parque Palermo, Montevideo

5 December 2026
16:30 UTC−3

Atenas	v	Colón

Estadio Ateniense, San Carlos

== Top scorers ==
Rank	Player	Club	Goals
1	(Uruguay) Sergio Cortelezzi	Huracán	14
2	(Uruguay) Ramiro Quintana	Colón	13
3	(Uruguay) Jonathan Isasmendi	Cerrito	12
4	(Uruguay) Lucas Rodríguez	Uruguay Montevideo	10
4	(Uruguay) Inti López	River Plate	10
4	(Uruguay) Matías Rigoleto	Oriental	10
7	(Uruguay) Michel Silveira	Rentistas	9
8	(Uruguay) Carlos Sánchez	Rentistas	8
8	(Uruguay) Joaquín Gottesman	La Luz	8
8	(Uruguay) Bruno Abbate	Miramar Misiones	8
8	(Uruguay) Gastón Colmán	Fénix	8

Source: BeSoccer

== Relegation ==
For this season, it was proposed to ditch direct relegation to the third-tier league Divisional C and instead hold two play-off series to be contested by the bottom two teams and the teams placing third and fourth in the 2026 Divisional C, aiming to expand the Segunda División Profesional to 16 teams starting from 2027.

On 14 October 2026, the Segunda División's League Council approved a proposal not to have direct relegation for the bottom two teams, but instead hold a play-off series between the Segunda División's last-placed team and the team placing third in the third-tier league. However, it was rejected by the Professional Football Council of the Uruguayan Football Association.

Uruguay Montevideo and Cerrito ended the season in the bottom two places of the relegation table and were relegated to Divisional C. The former was relegated with three rounds to go after a draw with Oriental and victories for Miramar Misiones and La Luz on 19 October 2026, while the latter was relegated on 11 November 2026, following wins for Miramar Misiones and La Luz on the final matchday of the season.

Pos	Team	2025 Pts	2026 Pts	Total Pts	Total Pld	Avg	Relegation
1	Plaza Colonia	—	53	53	32	1.656	
2	Atenas	57	51	108	64	1.688	
3	Colón	54	51	105	64	1.641	
4	Rentistas	44	52	96	64	1.5	
5	Oriental	50	44	94	64	1.469	
6	Huracán	—	44	44	32	1.375	
7	Fénix	43	42	85	64	1.328	
8	Paysandú	—	39	39	32	1.219	
9	Tacuarembó	51	29	80	64	1.25	
10	River Plate	—	38	38	32	1.188	
11	Miramar Misiones	—	38	38	32	1.188	
12	La Luz	31	44	75	64	1.172	
13	Cerrito (R)	26	43	69	64	1.078	Relegation to Primera Divisional C
14	Uruguay Montevideo (R)	26	34	60	64	0.938	Relegation to Primera Divisional C

Source: Soccerway

== See also ==
- 2026 Liga AUF Uruguaya
- 2026 Copa Uruguay
- 2026 Copa de la Liga AUF
