= 2026 Copa Uruguay =

Copa AUF Uruguay 2026

Tournament details
- Country: Uruguay
- Dates: 25 August – December 2026
- Teams: 44

Tournament statistics
- Matches played: 68
- Goals scored: 184 (2.71 per match)
- All statistics correct as of 10 November 2026.

The 2026 Copa Uruguay (officially known as Copa AUF Uruguay 2026), is the fifth edition of the Copa Uruguay, the country's national football cup tournament. The tournament is played from 25 August to December 2026 with 44 teams participating. The winners will qualify for the first stage of the 2027 Copa Libertadores.

Peñarol were the defending champions, but they were knocked out by Montevideo City Torque in the second stage.

== Format ==
For this season, the competition featured a change of format while also expanding to 44 teams: all 16 teams from Liga AUF Uruguaya, 8 from Segunda División, 8 from Primera División Amateur, 2 from Divisional D and 10 clubs from the Copa Nacional de Clubes organized by the Organización del Fútbol del Interior (OFI).

The first stage, which was contested by 32 clubs, was split into two paths: one for professional clubs and another one for amateur clubs. In the professional side, the 24 clubs from the first and second tier leagues were drawn into six groups of four teams in which teams played their group rivals once, with the top two teams in each group as well as the four best third-placed sides advancing to the next round, whilst the amateur path had the eight Primera División Amateur clubs, which were drawn into four single-match ties, with the winners advancing to the next round.

For the second stage, the professional and amateur paths remained separated, with the Divisional D and OFI clubs joining the four amateur winners from the previous round. In both paths, the 16 participating clubs were drawn into eight single-match ties, with the winners advancing to the round of 16. Starting from that round, the professional and amateur teams were able to play each other, playing a straight knockout competition, and amateur sides were granted home advantage. The semi-finals and the final will be played on neutral ground.

The winners of the competition will qualify for the 2027 Copa Libertadores through the Uruguay 4 berth, granting them access to the first stage of the continental competition, provided that they play in the top tier in 2027. If the champions do not fulfill this criterion, or have already qualified for the Copa Libertadores through league performance, the berth will be awarded to the best-placed team in the aggregate table of the 2026 Liga AUF Uruguaya that has not yet qualified.

== Schedule ==
The schedule of the competition is as follows:

Round	Draw date	Dates
Eliminatory stage	11 August 2026	Matchday 1: 25 August – 10 September 2026; Matchday 2: 1–16 September 2026; Matchday 3: 16–30 September 2026; Amateur path: 2–15 September 2026
Second stage	Amateur path: 11 September 2026; Professional path: 30 September 2026	Amateur path: 26 September – 21 October 2026; Professional path: 7–27 October 2026
Round of 16	19 October 2026	28 October – 5 November 2026
Quarter-finals	19 October 2026	9–10 November 2026
Semi-finals	19 October 2026	26–30 November 2026
Final	19 October 2026	TBD December 2026

== Qualified teams ==
44 clubs take part in this season's Copa Uruguay competition: the 16 from Liga AUF Uruguaya and 8 from Segunda División which were the top clubs in the league based on their performance at halfway point in the current season, for a total of 24 professional clubs. The competition also featured 20 amateur teams, those being eight from Primera División Amateur, the top two clubs that failed to promote in the previous Divisional D season, and 10 from the Copa Nacional de Clubes organized by the Organización del Fútbol del Interior (OFI), which were the eight clubs that qualified for the quarter-finals of the 2026 Divisional A tournament as well as two play-off winners.

Liga AUF Uruguaya; All 16 teams	Segunda División; The top 8 teams of the 2026 season at halfway point	Primera División Amateur; The top 4 teams of the 2026 Torneo Inicial and the best 4 teams that did not promote in the 2025 season	Divisional D The runner-up and third-placed team of the 2025 season	OFI; 8 quarter-finalists and 2 play-off winners of the 2026 Divisional A season
Albion; Boston River; Central Español; Cerro; Cerro Largo; Danubio; Defensor Sporting; Deportivo Maldonado; Juventud; Liverpool; Montevideo City Torque; Montevideo Wanderers; Nacional; Peñarol; Progreso; Racing	Atenas; Cerrito; Colón; Fénix; Oriental; Plaza Colonia; Rentistas; River Plate	Bella Vista; Deportivo Colonia; Deportivo Italiano; Deutscher; Durazno; Lito; Rampla Juniors; Terremoto	Real Montevideo; Rincón	Ferro Carril; Gladiador; Libertad; Nacional (Florida); Porongos; Racing (Durazno); Río Negro; San Carlos; Sportivo Barracas; Wanderers (Durazno)

== Eliminatory stage ==
The first stage, named eliminatory stage, was split into two paths: one for professional clubs and another one for amateur sides. The professional clubs were drawn into six groups of four, with the top two teams of each group as well as the four best third-placed sides advancing to the second stage, while in the amateur path the eight Primera División Amateur teams were drawn into four ties, with the winners advancing to the following round of the competition.

=== Professional path ===
==== Group 1 ====
Pos	Team	Pld	W	D	L	GF	GA	GD	Pts	Qualification	PEÑ	MCT	DAN	ATE
1	Peñarol	3	1	2	0	4	3	+1	5	Advance to the second stage	—	1–0	—	—
2	Montevideo City Torque	3	1	1	1	5	4	+1	4	Advance to the second stage	—	—	2–0	3–3
3	Danubio	3	1	1	1	4	5	−1	4	Advance to the second stage	1–1	—	—	3–2
4	Atenas	3	0	2	1	7	8	−1	2		2–2	—	—	—

Source: AUF
Legend: Blue = home team win; Yellow = draw; Red = away team win.
Rules for classification: 1) Points, 2) Goal difference, 3) Goals for, 4) Head-to-head record, 5) Drawing of lots.

==== Group 2 ====
Pos	Team	Pld	W	D	L	GF	GA	GD	Pts	Qualification	PCO	CRL	REN	DFS
1	Plaza Colonia	3	2	0	1	4	3	+1	6	Advance to the second stage	—	2–1	—	—
2	Cerro Largo	3	1	1	1	3	3	0	4	Advance to the second stage	—	—	1–0	1–1
3	Rentistas	3	1	1	1	2	2	0	4	Advance to the second stage	2–1	—	—	—
4	Defensor Sporting	3	0	2	1	1	2	−1	2		0–1	—	0–0	—

Source: AUF
Legend: Blue = home team win; Yellow = draw; Red = away team win.
Rules for classification: 1) Points, 2) Goal difference, 3) Goals for, 4) Head-to-head record, 5) Drawing of lots.

==== Group 3 ====
Pos	Team	Pld	W	D	L	GF	GA	GD	Pts	Qualification	DMA	CSC	WAN	CRR
1	Deportivo Maldonado	3	3	0	0	8	2	+6	6 (Note: Deportivo Maldonado were deducted three points and Montevideo Wanderers were awarded three points after the former team fielded ineligible players in its match against the latter.)	Advance to the second stage	—	—	4–1	—
2	Cerrito	3	2	0	1	5	3	+2	6	Advance to the second stage	0–2	—	—	—
3	Montevideo Wanderers	3	0	1	2	3	8	−5	4	Advance to the second stage	—	1–3	—	1–1
4	Cerro	3	0	1	2	2	5	−3	1		1–2	0–2	—	—

Source: AUF
Legend: Blue = home team win; Yellow = draw; Red = away team win.
Rules for classification: 1) Points, 2) Goal difference, 3) Goals for, 4) Head-to-head record, 5) Drawing of lots.

==== Group 4 ====
Pos	Team	Pld	W	D	L	GF	GA	GD	Pts	Qualification	CES	JUV	RAC	ORI
1	Central Español	3	2	1	0	8	3	+5	7	Advance to the second stage	—	3–0	—	1–1
2	Juventud	3	2	0	1	4	3	+1	6	Advance to the second stage	—	—	3–0	1–0
3	Racing	3	1	0	2	4	8	−4	3		2–4	—	—	—
4	Oriental	3	0	1	2	2	4	−2	1		—	—	1–2	—

Source: AUF
Legend: Blue = home team win; Yellow = draw; Red = away team win.
Rules for classification: 1) Points, 2) Goal difference, 3) Goals for, 4) Head-to-head record, 5) Drawing of lots.

==== Group 5 ====
Pos	Team	Pld	W	D	L	GF	GA	GD	Pts	Qualification	NAC	ALB	RIV	PRO
1	Nacional	3	2	1	0	4	2	+2	7	Advance to the second stage	—	0–0	—	—
2	Albion	3	1	2	0	2	1	+1	5	Advance to the second stage	—	—	0–0	2–1
3	River Plate	3	1	1	1	4	3	+1	4	Advance to the second stage	2–3	—	—	—
4	Progreso	3	0	0	3	1	5	−4	0		0–1	—	0–2	—

Source: AUF
Legend: Blue = home team win; Yellow = draw; Red = away team win.
Rules for classification: 1) Points, 2) Goal difference, 3) Goals for, 4) Head-to-head record, 5) Drawing of lots.

==== Group 6 ====
Pos	Team	Pld	W	D	L	GF	GA	GD	Pts	Qualification	BOR	LIV	FEN	COL
1	Boston River	3	3	0	0	6	2	+4	9	Advance to the second stage	—	—	3–2	2–0
2	Liverpool	3	2	0	1	5	1	+4	6	Advance to the second stage	0–1	—	—	3–0
3	Fénix	3	0	1	2	5	8	−3	1		—	0–2	—	—
4	Colón	3	0	1	2	3	8	−5	1		—	—	3–3	—

Source: AUF
Legend: Blue = home team win; Yellow = draw; Red = away team win.
Rules for classification: 1) Points, 2) Goal difference, 3) Goals for, 4) Head-to-head record, 5) Drawing of lots.

==== Ranking of third-placed teams ====
The four best teams among those ranked third in their groups advanced to the second stage.

Pos	Grp	Team	Pld	W	D	L	GF	GA	GD	Pts	Qualification
1	5	River Plate	3	1	1	1	4	3	+1	4	Advance to the second stage
2	2	Rentistas	3	1	1	1	2	2	0	4	Advance to the second stage
3	1	Danubio	3	1	1	1	4	5	−1	4	Advance to the second stage
4	3	Montevideo Wanderers	3	0	1	2	3	8	−5	4 (Note: Montevideo Wanderers were awarded the three points of their eliminatory stage match against Deportivo Maldonado after the latter team fielded ineligible players.)	Advance to the second stage
5	4	Racing	3	1	0	2	4	8	−4	3	
6	6	Fénix	3	0	1	2	5	8	−3	1	

Source: AUF
Rules for classification: 1) Points; 2) Goal difference; 3) Goals for; 4) Drawing of lots.

=== Amateur path ===
Team 1	Score	Team 2
Deutscher	0–2	Deportivo Italiano
Rampla Juniors	1–2	Lito
Terremoto	0–2	Bella Vista
Durazno	2–0	Deportivo Colonia

== Second stage ==
=== Professional path ===
The 16 qualified teams from the eliminatory stage were seeded into two pots, with Pot 1 featuring the six group winners and the best two group runners-up, who had home advantage for their match in this round, while the remaining teams were seeded in Pot 2. The draw for the professional path matches was held on 30 September 2026.

7 October 2026	Cerrito	2–2 (3–4 p)	Montevideo Wanderers	Montevideo
15:30 UTC−3	Machado 14'; Silveira 90+1'	Report	Marques 54'; Sánchez 90+4'	Stadium: Parque Maracaná; Referee: Andrés Martínez
	Penalties
	Silveira (penalty scored); Viera (penalty scored); Soto (penalty scored); Isasmendi (penalty missed); Avilés (penalty missed)		(penalty missed) Rivero; (penalty scored) Guzmán; (penalty scored) Río; (penalty scored) Sánchez; (penalty scored) Oriol

7 October 2026	Plaza Colonia	0–1	Juventud	Colonia del Sacramento
20:00 UTC−3		Report	Domínguez 63'	Stadium: Parque Juan Prandi; Referee: Pablo Silveira

14 October 2026	Boston River	0–0 (4–3 p)	River Plate	Florida
15:30 UTC−3		Report		Stadium: Campeones Olímpicos; Referee: Augusto Olmos
	Penalties
	Saravia (penalty scored); Suárez (penalty missed); O'Neil (penalty scored); Bonfiglio (penalty scored); Suhr (penalty scored)		(penalty scored) De los Santos; (penalty missed) Gómez; (penalty scored) C. Rodríguez; (penalty missed) M. Rodríguez; (penalty scored) Camejo

14 October 2026	Deportivo Maldonado	4–1	Albion	Maldonado
21:00 UTC−3	Tabó 45'; Mozzone 59'; Cartagena 90+3'; Araújo 90+4'	Report	Vera 31'	Stadium: Domingo Burgueño Miguel; Referee: Leandro Lasso

15 October 2026	Central Español	0–6	Danubio	Montevideo
16:00 UTC−3		Report	Tizón 31'; Ferreira 36'; Cabrera 45+1', 46'; Pereira 75'; Piriz 88'	Stadium: Parque Palermo; Referee: Federico Arman

15 October 2026	Nacional	3–0	Rentistas	Montevideo
20:00 UTC−3	Rogel 40'; Verón Lupi 64'; Botta 74'	Report		Stadium: Gran Parque Central; Referee: Eduardo Varela

21 October 2026	Liverpool	1–0	Cerro Largo	Montevideo
16:00 UTC−3	Macchia 89'	Report		Stadium: Parque Alfredo Víctor Viera; Referee: Juan Cianni

27 October 2026	Peñarol	0–2	Montevideo City Torque	Montevideo
19:30 UTC−3		Report	Da Silva 55' (pen.), 73'	Stadium: Campeón del Siglo; Referee: Bruno Sacarelo

=== Amateur path ===
The four winners from the previous round were joined by two Divisional D teams and 10 OFI sides in this round. The draw for the amateur path was held on 11 September 2026.

Team 1	Score	Team 2
Lito	2–0	Durazno
Racing (Durazno)	0–1	San Carlos
Nacional (Florida)	2–0	Rincón
Porongos	1–1 (4–3 p)	Deportivo Italiano
Gladiador	1–1 (4–1 p)	Sportivo Barracas
Libertad	3–1	Bella Vista
Ferro Carril	2–1	Real Montevideo
Río Negro	1–4	Wanderers (Durazno)

== Final stages ==
=== Bracket ===
Round of 16
San Carlos	0
Boston River	2
Libertad	0
Montevideo City Torque	6
Porongos	0
Deportivo Maldonado	4
Ferro Carril	1
Nacional	2
Lito	4
Montevideo Wanderers	0
Wanderers (Durazno)	0
Danubio	3
Gladiador	0
Liverpool	2
Nacional (Florida)	0
Juventud	2

Quarter-finals
Boston River	1
Montevideo City Torque	2
Deportivo Maldonado	1
Nacional	2
Lito	1 (4)
Danubio (p)	1 (5)
Liverpool	1 (0)
Juventud (p)	1 (3)

Semi-finals
Montevideo City Torque
Nacional
Danubio
Juventud

Final

=== Round of 16 ===
In this round, the eight professional teams were drawn against the eight amateur sides in eight ties, with the latter ones being granted home advantage for the match. The draw for this round as well as the remaining final rounds was held on 19 October 2026, and the matches took place from 28 October to 5 November 2026.

28 October 2026	Nacional (Florida)	0–2	Juventud	Florida
16:00 UTC−3		Report	Cecchini 37'; Boselli 69'	Stadium: Campeones Olímpicos; Referee: Leandro Lasso

28 October 2026	Porongos	0–4	Deportivo Maldonado	Trinidad
20:30 UTC−3		Report	Sosa 5'; Centeno 63'; Bolzán 83'; López 88'	Stadium: Juan Antonio Lavalleja; Referee: Felipe Vikonis

29 October 2026	Wanderers (Durazno)	0–3	Danubio	Durazno
20:30 UTC−3		Report	Montaña 23'; Fernández 31'; Costantino 90+6' (pen.)	Stadium: Silvestre Octavio Landoni; Referee: Andrés Martínez

4 November 2026	San Carlos	0–2	Boston River	San Carlos
15:00 UTC−3		Report	Siri 14'; Bonfliglio 90'	Stadium: Ateniense; Referee: Kevin Fontes

4 November 2026	Ferro Carril	1–2	Nacional	Paysandú
21:00 UTC−3	Tabarez 45+3' (pen.)	Report	Silvera 6', 21'	Stadium: Parque Artigas; Referee: Esteban Guerra

5 November 2026	Lito	4–0	Montevideo Wanderers	Montevideo
16:00 UTC−3	Brener 13'; Aires 26', 55', 74'	Report		Stadium: Parque Abraham Paladino; Referee: Juan Cianni

5 November 2026	Gladiador	0–2	Liverpool	Tacuarembó
18:00 UTC−3		Report	Pintos 21'; Macchia 71'	Stadium: Raúl Goyenola; Referee: Eduardo Varela

5 November 2026	Libertad	0–6	Montevideo City Torque	Maldonado
21:00 UTC−3		Report	Da Silva 35', 60'; Lecchini 45'; Shaw 57'; Molina 74'; Duré 81'	Stadium: Domingo Burgueño Miguel; Referee: Augusto Olmos

=== Quarter-finals ===
9 November 2026	Lito	1–1 (4–5 p)	Danubio	Montevideo
16:00 UTC−3	Alles 80' (pen.)	Report	Brasil 87'	Stadium: Parque Abraham Paladino; Referee: Federico Arman
	Penalties
	Alles (penalty scored); Sena (penalty scored); Correa (penalty scored); Brener (penalty missed); Romero (penalty scored); Cubero (penalty missed)		(penalty scored) Fernández; (penalty scored) Millán; (penalty scored) Velázquez; (penalty scored) Brasil; (penalty missed) Cabrera; (penalty scored) Tomatis

9 November 2026	Deportivo Maldonado	1–2	Nacional	Maldonado
21:00 UTC−3	Cartagena 87'	Report	Gómez 7'; Silvera 74'	Stadium: Domingo Burgueño Miguel; Referee: Kevin Fontes

10 November 2026	Boston River	1–2	Montevideo City Torque	Florida
16:30 UTC−3	Saravia 83' (pen.)	Report	Martínez 30' (o.g.); Da Silva 39' (pen.)	Stadium: Campeones Olímpicos; Referee: Daniel Rodríguez

10 November 2026	Liverpool	1–1 (0–3 p)	Juventud	Montevideo
21:00 UTC−3	Martínez 81'	Report	Pereiro 43'	Stadium: Parque Alfredo Víctor Viera; Referee: Juan Cianni
	Penalties
	Bentancourt (penalty missed); Zabala (penalty missed); Cayetano (penalty missed)		(penalty scored) Barrandeguy; (penalty scored) Rolón; (penalty scored) Roldán

=== Semi-finals ===
26 November 2026	Montevideo City Torque	v	Nacional	Durazno
21:30 UTC−3				Stadium: Silvestre Octavio Landoni

30 November 2026	Danubio	v	Juventud	Montevideo
20:30 UTC−3				Stadium: Parque Alfredo Víctor Viera

== See also ==
- 2026 Liga AUF Uruguaya
- 2026 Uruguayan Segunda División season
