= 2025 Copa Uruguay =

Copa AUF Uruguay 2025

Tournament details
- Country: Uruguay
- Dates: 5 August – 29 October 2025
- Teams: 32

Final positions
- Champions: Peñarol (1st title)
- Runners-up: Plaza Colonia

Tournament statistics
- Matches played: 31
- Goals scored: 82 (2.65 per match)

The 2025 Copa Uruguay (officially known as Copa AUF Uruguay 2025), was the fourth edition of the Copa Uruguay, the country's national football cup tournament. The tournament was played from 5 August to 29 October 2025 with 32 teams participating.

Peñarol won their first Copa Uruguay title in this edition, after defeating Plaza Colonia 2–0 in the final. For the first time since its inception, the competition was to grant an international berth to its winner, which would qualify for the 2026 Copa Libertadores. However, since the eventual champions Peñarol had already qualified for the competition on league performance, the berth was instead awarded to the best team of the 2025 Primera División aggregate table that had not yet qualified.

Defensor Sporting were the defending champions, but were eliminated by Peñarol in the semi-finals.

== Format ==
The competition retained the format used in its previous edition, with 32 teams participating: 10 teams from the Uruguayan Primera División, 6 from Segunda División, 4 from Primera División Amateur, 2 from Divisional D and 10 clubs from the Copa Nacional de Clubes organized by the Organización del Fútbol del Interior (OFI). The 32 clubs will play a straight knockout competition, with the amateur clubs from the Uruguayan Football Association (AUF) and OFI being drawn against the 16 AUF professional clubs in the 16 ties for the first round, with the matches in this round to be hosted by the amateur teams. Ties in the subsequent rounds of the competition (round of 16, quarter-finals, semi-finals, and final) were also played over a single leg, with the semi-finals and the final played on neutral ground.

The winners of the competition were set to qualify for the 2026 Copa Libertadores under the Uruguay 4 berth, granting them access to the first stage of the continental competition, provided that they played in Primera División in 2026. If the champions were either ineligible to qualify or had already qualified for a higher berth, the Copa Uruguay berth would be transferred to the Primera División's aggregate table.

== Schedule ==
The schedule of the competition was as follows:

Round	Draw date	Dates
Round of 32	15 July 2025	5–7 August 2025; 26–28 August 2025
Round of 16	15 July 2025	9–11 September 2025
Quarter-finals	15 July 2025	24 September – 2 October 2025
Semi-finals	15 July 2025	15–16 October 2025
Final	15 July 2025	29 October 2025

== Qualified teams ==
32 clubs took part in this season's Copa Uruguay competition: 10 from Primera División, 6 from Segunda División, and 4 from Primera División Amateur, which were the top clubs in their respective leagues based on their performance at halfway point, considering the aggregate table of each division. In the case of the Divisional D, the two participating clubs were the top clubs that failed to promote in the previous season, given that the 2025 edition of the fourth tier tournament had not started at the moment the Primera División's Torneo Intermedio ended, whilst for the Copa Nacional de Clubes organized by the Organización del Fútbol del Interior (OFI), the eight clubs that qualified for the quarter-finals of 2025 Divisional A tournament as well as two play-off winners were the ones that qualified.

Primera División; The top 10 teams of the 2025 season's aggregate table after the Torneo Intermedio	Segunda División; The top 6 teams of the 2025 season at the end of the Primera División's Torneo Intermedio	Primera División Amateur; The top 4 teams of the 2025 season's aggregate table at the end of the Primera División's Torneo Intermedio	Divisional D The runner-up and third-placed team of the 2024 season	OFI; 8 quarter-finalists and 2 play-off winners of the 2025 Divisional A season
Nacional; Juventud; Peñarol; Liverpool; Defensor Sporting; Racing; Boston River; Plaza Colonia; Montevideo Wanderers; Cerro Largo	Tacuarembó; Albion; Oriental; Atenas; Deportivo Maldonado; Central Español	Durazno; Paysandú; Bella Vista; Huracán	Rincón; Paso de la Arena	Libertad; San Carlos; Universitario; Arsenal; Río Negro; Wanderers (Durazno); Atenas (Tala); Nacional (Nueva Helvecia); Atlético Florida; Porongos

== Bracket ==
Round of 32
Arsenal	0
Oriental	1
Libertad	0
Defensor Sporting	3
Bella Vista	1
Juventud	0
Nacional (Nueva Helvecia)	1
Central Español	3
Rincón	1 (3)
Cerro Largo (p)	1 (5)
San Carlos	1 (3)
Tacuarembó (p)	1 (4)
Río Negro	0
Peñarol	3
Durazno	1
Liverpool	3
Atenas (Tala)	0 (2)
Racing (p)	0 (4)
Paso de la Arena	0
Boston River	3
Universitario	2
Montevideo Wanderers	0
Atlético Florida	3
Atenas	1
Huracán	1
Nacional	2
Wanderers (Durazno)	2 (2)
Plaza Colonia (p)	2 (4)
Paysandú	0
Albion	2
Porongos (p)	2 (3)
Deportivo Maldonado	2 (0)

Round of 16
Oriental	0
Defensor Sporting	2
Bella Vista	1
Central Español	2
Cerro Largo	0
Tacuarembó	1
Peñarol	2
Liverpool	1
Racing (p)	0 (4)
Boston River	0 (3)
Universitario	7
Atlético Florida	0
Nacional	1
Plaza Colonia	2
Albion	4
Porongos	0

Quarter-finals
Defensor Sporting	2
Central Español	0
Tacuarembó	1
Peñarol	2
Racing	4
Universitario	1
Plaza Colonia	1
Albion	0

Semi-finals
Defensor Sporting	0
Peñarol	2
Racing	1 (3)
Plaza Colonia (p)	1 (4)

Final
Peñarol	2
Plaza Colonia	0

== Round of 32 ==
5 August 2025	Rincón	1–1 (3–5 p)	Cerro Largo	Montevideo
19:00 UTC−3	Pérez 26'	Report	Assis 64'	Stadium: Complejo Rentistas; Referee: Kevin Fontes

5 August 2025	Arsenal	0–1	Oriental	Salto
20:30 UTC−3		Report	Rey 44' (pen.)	Stadium: Juan José Vispo Mari; Referee: Leandro Lasso

6 August 2025	Libertad	0–3	Defensor Sporting	Maldonado
20:30 UTC−3		Report	Biscayzacú 8', 48'; Dudok 58'	Stadium: Domingo Burgueño Miguel; Referee: Juan Cianni

6 August 2025	Nacional (Nueva Helvecia)	1–3	Central Español	Nueva Helvecia
20:30 UTC−3	Daghero 15'	Report	Yocco 3', 69'; Sequeira 90'	Stadium: Nacional de Nueva Helvecia; Referee: Daniel Rodríguez

6 August 2025	Atlético Florida	3–1	Atenas	Florida
20:30 UTC−3	Alaniz 8'; Fontes 21'; García 35'	Report	Núñez 59'	Stadium: Campeones Olímpicos; Referee: Augusto Olmos

6 August 2025	Paysandú	0–2	Albion	Paysandú
20:30 UTC−3		Report	Burruzo 31'; Sánchez 84'	Stadium: Parque Artigas; Referee: Felipe Vikonis

6 August 2025	Porongos	2–2 (3–0 p)	Deportivo Maldonado	Trinidad
20:30 UTC−3	Acosta 15'; Monzón 69'	Report	Espíndola 23'; Poiso 73'	Stadium: Juan Antonio Lavalleja; Referee: Esteban Guerra

7 August 2025	Durazno	1–3	Liverpool	Montevideo
15:00 UTC−3	Nicolini 30'	Report	Machado 16'; Castro 34'; Hernández 62'	Stadium: José Pedro Damiani; Referee: Eduardo Varela

7 August 2025	Wanderers (Durazno)	2–2 (2–4 p)	Plaza Colonia	Durazno
20:30 UTC−3	Olivera 22', 43'	Report	López 67'; Hernández 90'	Stadium: Silvestre Octavio Landoni; Referee: Federico Modernell

26 August 2025	Universitario	2–0	Montevideo Wanderers	Salto
20:30 UTC−3	Pintos 67'; Sotelo 83'	Report		Stadium: Juan José Vispo Mari; Referee: Kevin Fontes

26 August 2025	Huracán	1–2	Nacional	Minas
20:30 UTC−3	López 78'	Report	Ebere 15'; Mereles 66'	Stadium: Juan Antonio Lavalleja; Referee: Esteban Guerra

27 August 2025	Bella Vista	1–0	Juventud	Montevideo
14:00 UTC−3	Díaz 55'	Report		Stadium: Parque Palermo; Referee: Pablo Silveira

27 August 2025	San Carlos	1–1 (3–4 p)	Tacuarembó	Maldonado
20:30 UTC−3	Díaz 27'	Report	Piegas 24'	Stadium: Domingo Burgueño Miguel; Referee: Federico Arman

27 August 2025	Río Negro	0–3	Peñarol	San José de Mayo
20:30 UTC−3		Report	Arezo 28', 81'; Umpiérrez 60'	Stadium: Casto Martínez Laguarda; Referee: Augusto Olmos

27 August 2025	Paso de la Arena	0–3	Boston River	Montevideo
20:30 UTC−3		Report	González 45+1', 90+3'; Viera 51'	Stadium: Complejo Rentistas; Referee: Juan Cianni

28 August 2025	Atenas (Tala)	0–0 (2–4 p)	Racing	Minas
20:30 UTC−3		Report		Stadium: Juan Antonio Lavalleja; Referee: Eduardo Varela

== Round of 16 ==
9 September 2025	Bella Vista	1–2	Central Español	Montevideo
15:00 UTC−3	Larzabal 25'	Report	Gonella 10'; Muñiz 79'	Stadium: Luis Tróccoli; Referee: Anahí Fernández

10 September 2025	Oriental	0–2	Defensor Sporting	Montevideo
14:00 UTC−3		Report	Navarro 69'; Torterolo 90+2'	Stadium: Parque Palermo; Referee: Felipe Vikonis

10 September 2025	Racing	0–0 (4–3 p)	Boston River	Montevideo
15:30 UTC−3		Report		Stadium: Osvaldo Roberto; Referee: Bruno Sacarelo

10 September 2025	Cerro Largo	0–1	Tacuarembó	Melo
19:00 UTC−3		Report	Mederos 65'	Stadium: Arquitecto Antonio Eleuterio Ubilla; Referee: Andrés Martínez

10 September 2025	Peñarol	2–1	Liverpool	Montevideo
20:30 UTC−3	Terans 8'; L. Hernández 90+4'	Report	Machado 34'	Stadium: Centenario; Referee: Leandro Lasso

10 September 2025	Albion	4–0	Porongos	Montevideo
20:30 UTC−3	Brum 16', 27'; Burruzo 48'; Roldán 65'	Report		Stadium: Parque Palermo; Referee: Federico Modernell

11 September 2025	Universitario	7–0	Atlético Florida	Salto
20:30 UTC−3	De Souza 3', 23', 34', 51'; Dos Santos 5'; Ávalos 66'; Díaz 89'	Report		Stadium: Juan José Vispo Mari; Referee: Pablo Silveira

11 September 2025	Nacional	1–2	Plaza Colonia	Montevideo
20:30 UTC−3	N. López 61'	Report	Á. López 76'; Vergara 85'	Stadium: Gran Parque Central; Referee: Santiago Motta

== Quarter-finals ==
24 September 2025	Tacuarembó	1–2	Peñarol	Tacuarembó
20:30 UTC−3	Machado 25'	Report	Umpiérrez 78'; Terans 90+12' (pen.)	Stadium: Raúl Goyenola; Referee: Esteban Guerra

25 September 2025	Racing	4–1	Universitario	Montevideo
15:30 UTC−3	Manzur 18', 43'; Suárez 67'; Cairus 85'	Report	Dos Santos 40'	Stadium: Osvaldo Roberto; Referee: Anahí Fernández

1 October 2025	Plaza Colonia	1–0	Albion	Colonia del Sacramento
20:30 UTC−3	Vergara 89'	Report		Stadium: Parque Juan Prandi; Referee: Felipe Vikonis

2 October 2025	Defensor Sporting	2–0	Central Español	Montevideo
20:30 UTC−3	Abreu 37'; Machado 70'	Report		Stadium: Luis Franzini; Referee: Pablo Silveira

== Semi-finals ==
15 October 2025	Defensor Sporting	0–2	Peñarol	Montevideo
21:00 UTC−3		Report	Arezo 48'; Silvera 62'	Stadium: Parque Alfredo Víctor Viera; Referee: Santiago Motta

16 October 2025	Racing	1–1 (3–4 p)	Plaza Colonia	Florida
21:00 UTC−3	Da Silva 4'	Report	López 68'	Stadium: Campeones Olímpicos; Referee: Bruno Sacarelo
	Penalties
	Ferreira (penalty missed); Da Silva (penalty scored); Ramírez (penalty missed); Espinosa (penalty scored); Cairus (penalty scored); Tomatis (penalty missed)		(penalty scored) Ramos; (penalty missed) Alex Bruno; (penalty scored) López; (penalty scored) Vergara; (penalty missed) Ocampo; (penalty scored) Carrizo

== Final ==
29 October 2025
20:30 UTC−3

Peñarol	2–0	Plaza Colonia
Reyes 62' (o.g.); Remedi 84'	Report

Estadio Centenario, Montevideo
Referee: Esteban Guerra

== See also ==
- 2025 Uruguayan Primera División season
- 2025 Uruguayan Segunda División season
