= Jorge Rodríguez (footballer, born 1977) =

Uruguayan footballer

Personal information
- Full name: Jorge Damián Rodríguez Larraura
- Date of birth: 24 January 1977 (age 49)
- Place of birth: Montevideo, Uruguay
- Height: 1.93 m (6 ft 4 in)
- Position: Goalkeeper

Team information
- Current team: Cerro (goalkeeping coach)

Senior career*
| Years | Team | Apps | (Gls) |
| 1994–1996 | Progreso | | |
| 1997 | Basáñez | | |
| 1998 | Progreso | | |
| 1999 | Unión San Felipe | | |
| 2000 | Juventud Las Piedras | | |
| 2000 | Guaraní | | |
| 2001 | Unión Española | 0 | (0) |
| 2002–2003 | Cobresal | 34 | (0) |
| 2003 | Paysandú Bella Vista | | |
| 2004 | Progreso | 9 | (0) |
| 2004 | Tacuarembó | | |
| 2005 | Tiro Federal | 2 | (0) |
| 2005 | Tacuarembó | | |
| 2006 | Uruguay Montevideo | 10 | (0) |
| 2006 | Nacional Asunción | 0 | (0) |
| 2007 | Racing Montevideo | 12 | (0) |
| 2007–2010 | Melgar | 152 | (0) |
| 2011 | Cerrito | | |
| 2012–2013 | Progreso | 32 | (0) |
| 2013–2014 | Villa Teresa | 39 | (0) |
| 2015 | Colón | 3 | (0) |

Managerial career
- 2026: Cerro (interim)
- * Club domestic league appearances and goals

Jorge Damián Rodríguez Larraura (born 24 January 1977, in Montevideo, Uruguay) is a Uruguayan football coach and former player who played as a goalkeeper. He is the current goalkeeping coach of Cerro.

== Teams ==
- (Uruguay) Progreso 1994–1996
- (Uruguay) Basáñez 1997
- (Uruguay) Progreso 1998
- (Chile) Unión San Felipe 1999
- (Uruguay) Juventud de Las Piedras 2000
- (Paraguay) Guaraní 2000
- (Chile) Unión Española 2001
- (Chile) Cobresal 2002-2003
- (Uruguay) Paysandú Bella Vista 2003
- (Uruguay) Progreso 2004
- (Uruguay) Tacuarembó 2004
- (Argentina) Tiro Federal 2005
- (Uruguay) Tacuarembó 2005
- Uruguay Montevideo 2006
- (Paraguay) Nacional 2006
- (Uruguay) Racing de Montevideo 2007
- (Peru) Melgar 2007-2010
- (Uruguay) Cerrito 2011
- (Uruguay) Progreso 2012-2013
- (Uruguay) Villa Teresa 2013–2014
- (Uruguay) Colón 2015
