= Juan Martín Gonella =

Uruguayan footballer (born 1996)

Personal information
- Full name: Juan Martín Gonella Cores
- Date of birth: 16 March 1996 (age 30)
- Place of birth: Montevideo, Uruguay
- Height: 1.81 m (5 ft 11 in)
- Position: Forward

Team information
- Current team: Cerrito
- Number: 7

Youth career
- ?–2018: Fénix

Senior career*
Years	Team	Apps	(Gls)
2016–2017	Fénix	0	(0)
2016–2017	→ Deportivo Maldonado (loan)	36	(10)
2018–2019	Deportivo Maldonado	24	(2)
2019	Progreso	4	(0)
2020–	Cerrito	10	(0)
- * Club domestic league appearances and goals as of 20:56, 23 November 2020 (UTC)

Juan Martín Gonella Cores (born 16 March 1996) is a Uruguayan footballer who plays as a forward for Club Sportivo Cerrito in the Uruguayan Segunda División.
