= Silvio Dorrego =

Uruguayan footballer (born 1987)

Personal information
- Full name: Silvio Emiliano Dorrego Coito
- Date of birth: 30 March 1987 (age 39)
- Place of birth: Montevideo, Uruguay
- Height: 1.85 m (6 ft 1 in)
- Position: Central defender

Youth career
- Danubio
- Club Nacional

Senior career*
Years	Team	Apps	(Gls)
2009–2011	Cerrito	39	(2)
2011	Rentistas	10	(0)
2012–2013	Progreso	31	(1)
2013	Juventud	8	(1)
2014	Botoșani	1	(0)
2014	Fénix	9	(0)
2015	Cerro	11	(0)
2015	Deportivo Maldonado	4	(0)
2016	Progreso	13	(0)
2017	Central Español	26	(1)
2018	Cerrito	12	(0)
2019	Villa Española	13	(0)
Total		177	(5)
- * Club domestic league appearances and goals

Silvio Emiliano Dorrego Coito (born 30 March 1987) is a Uruguayan former footballer who played as a defender.
