= Juan Toya =

Uruguayan footballer (born 1982)

Personal information
- Full name: Juan Marcelo Toya
- Date of birth: 18 November 1982 (age 43)
- Place of birth: Montevideo, Uruguay
- Position: Forward

Senior career*
Years	Team	Apps	(Gls)
2003	Cerro		
2003	Nacional		
2004	Liverpool		
2005	Uruguay Montevideo		
2006	Real España		
2006	Tacuarembó		
2007	Juventud Las Piedras		
2007–2008	Uruguay Montevideo		
2008	El Tanque Sisley		
2008	Juan Aurich		
2009	El Tanque Sisley		
2009–2010	Sportivo Belgrano		
2010–2011	Colegiales		
2011	Sarmiento de Junín		
2012–present	Sportivo Belgrano		
- * Club domestic league appearances and goals

Juan Marcelo Toya (born November 18, 1982, in Montevideo, Uruguay), is a Uruguayan association football forward currently playing for Sportivo Belgrano of the Torneo Argentino A in Argentina.
