= Juan Manuel Ferreira =

Uruguayan footballer (born 1992)

Personal information
- Full name: Juan Manuel Ferreira Fernández
- Date of birth: 24 September 1992 (age 34)
- Place of birth: Maldonado, Uruguay
- Height: 1.80 m (5 ft 11 in)
- Position: Midfielder

Team information
- Current team: Huracán FC

Youth career
- Deportivo Maldonado

Senior career*
Years	Team	Apps	(Gls)
2011–2016	Deportivo Maldonado	56	(4)
2015	→ Coquimbo Unido (loan)	10	(2)
2017	Huracán FC	18	(0)
2018–2019	Deportivo Caaguazú	–	(–)
2019	Sport Valenzolano	–	(–)
2019–2020	Libertad San Carlos	–	(–)
2020–2021	Deportivo Beirut	–	(–)
2021–	Huracán FC	–	(–)
- * Club domestic league appearances and goals as of 15 May 2024

Juan Manuel Ferreira Fernández (born 24 September 1992) is a Uruguayan footballer who plays as a midfielder for Huracán FC.

== Career ==
Ferreira started his career with Deportivo Maldonado in his homeland. Besides Uruguay, Ferreira has played in Chile and Paraguay. In 2015, he played for Chilean side Coquimbo Unido. In Paraguay, he played for Deportivo Caaguazú and Sport Valenzolano.

In 2017, he played for Huracán FC.

In 2019, he returned to Uruguay and joined Libertad de San Carlos.
