= Ignacio de León =

Uruguayan footballer (born 1977)

Personal information
- Full name: Ignacio Leonardo de León Jacue
- Date of birth: 15 November 1977 (age 48)
- Place of birth: Montevideo, Uruguay
- Height: 1.90 m (6 ft 3 in)
- Position: Goalkeeper

Team information
- Current team: Deportivo Maldonado
- Number: 1

Senior career*
Years	Team	Apps	(Gls)
2001–2005	Fénix		
2005–2006	Cerro		
2006–2007	Rocha	15	(0)
2007–2008	River Plate (URU)	12	(0)
2008–2009	Nacional		
2009–2010	Tacuarembó F.C.	15	(0)
2010–2013	Central Español	32	(0)
2013–	Deportivo Maldonado		

International career
2003	Uruguay	1	(0)
- * Club domestic league appearances and goals

Ignacio de León (born 15 November 1977 in Montevideo) is a Uruguayan footballer who plays for Deportivo Maldonado.

== International career ==
De León has made one appearance for the senior Uruguay national football team, a friendly against Peru on 24 July 2003.
