= 2025 Uruguayan Segunda División season =

Segunda División Profesional
- Season: 2025
- Dates: 8 March – 29 November 2025
- Champions: Albion (2nd title)
- Promoted: Albion; Central Español; Deportivo Maldonado
- Relegated: Rampla Juniors; Artigas
- Matches: 230
- Goals: 498 (2.17 per match)
- Top goalscorer: Maximiliano Noble (15 goals)
- Biggest home win: Colón 8–0 Rampla Juniors (8 March)
- Biggest away win: Artigas 1–7 Atenas (12 October)
- Highest scoring: Colón 8–0 Rampla Juniors (8 March); Dep. Maldonado 4–4 La Luz (26 April); Artigas 1–7 Atenas (12 October)

The 2025 Uruguayan Segunda División season was the 118th season of the Uruguayan Segunda División, the second division championship of football in Uruguay. The season, which was named José Ignacio Villarreal, started on 8 March and ended on 29 November 2025. A total of 14 teams competed in the season; the top two teams and the winner of the promotion play-offs were promoted to the Liga AUF Uruguaya. The fixture draw for the season was held on 21 February 2025.

Albion became the first club promoted to the top flight for the following season, clinching promotion with two rounds to go in the regular stage after defeating Rentistas 4–1 on 12 October. Albion also claimed their second Segunda División title on 26 October, the final matchday of the regular season, following a 0–0 draw with Central Español who became the second promoted team. The final promotion spot was claimed by Deportivo Maldonado, who won the promotion play-off on 29 November after defeating Atenas in the finals.

Rampla Juniors and Artigas were relegated to the third-tier league Primera División Amateur. Since the relegation of both clubs was confirmed prior to the end of the regular season, both declined to play their final match against each other.

== Teams ==
Locations of the 2025 season teams outside Montevideo.
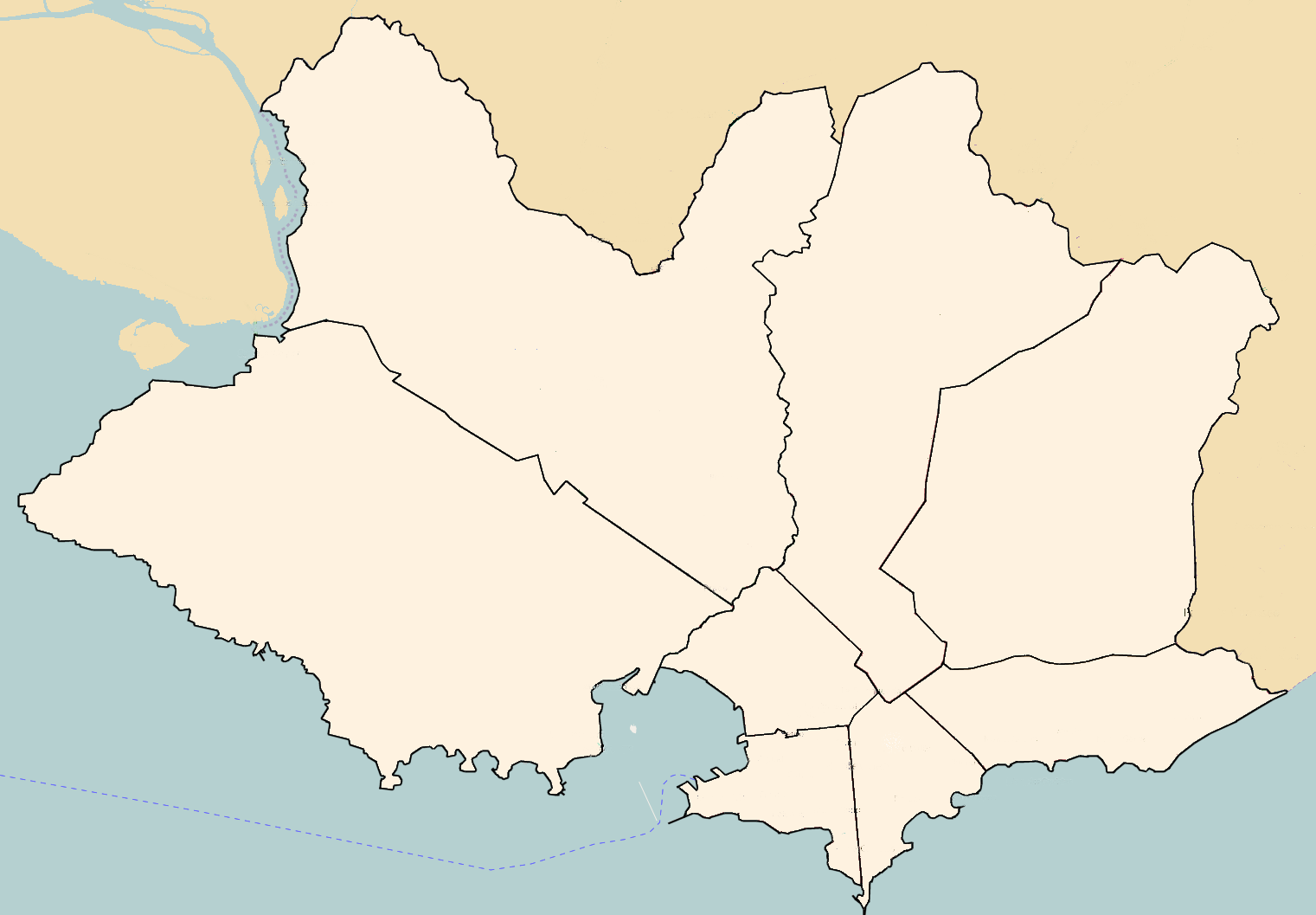
Locations of the 2025 Segunda División teams within Montevideo.

Fourteen teams took part in the season, nine of them returning from the previous edition. Rampla Juniors, Fénix, and Deportivo Maldonado, relegated from Primera División, replaced Plaza Colonia, Montevideo City Torque, and Juventud, who promoted to the top flight at the end of the previous season. On the other hand, Cooper and Sud América, relegated from Segunda División in the previous season, were replaced by the 2024 Primera División Amateur champions Artigas and runners-up Central Español.

=== Club information ===
Club	City	Home stadium (Note: The stadiums owned by Colón, Oriental, and Uruguay Montevideo do not meet the requirements to host league games. On the other hand, Albion, Artigas, and La Luz do not own a stadium.)	Capacity
Albion	Montevideo	Luis Franzini	16,000
Artigas	Artigas	Walter Martínez Cerrutti	3,500
Atenas	San Carlos	Atenas	6,000
Central Español	Montevideo	Parque Palermo	6,500
Cerrito	Montevideo	Parque Maracaná	8,000
Colón	Montevideo	Parque Palermo	6,500
Deportivo Maldonado	Maldonado	Domingo Burgueño Miguel	22,000
Fénix	Montevideo	Parque Capurro	10,000
La Luz	Montevideo	Parque Palermo	6,500
Oriental	La Paz	Parque Palermo	6,500
Rampla Juniors	Montevideo	Olímpico	9,500
Rentistas	Montevideo	Complejo Rentistas	10,600
Tacuarembó	Tacuarembó	Raúl Goyenola	12,000
Uruguay Montevideo	Montevideo	Parque Palermo	6,500

== Torneo Competencia ==
The Torneo Competencia was the first stage of the tournament. The 14 participating teams were divided into two groups of seven where they played each one of the teams in their group under a single round-robin format. The winners of each group advanced to the final, with the winner being assured of a berth into the promotion play-offs.

=== Serie A ===
Pos	Team	Pld	W	D	L	GF	GA	GD	Pts	Qualification	ATE	CEN	ALB	URU	REN	ART	CER
1	Atenas	6	4	1	1	7	3	+4	13	Advance to Final	—	—	0–0	1–0	—	—	2–1
2	Central Español	6	4	0	2	8	6	+2	12		0–1	—	—	—	0–1	2–1	—
3	Albion	6	3	2	1	6	4	+2	11		—	1–2	—	1–0	—	—	2–1
4	Uruguay Montevideo	6	3	0	3	8	6	+2	9		—	1–2	—	—	1–0	3–1	—
5	Rentistas	6	2	2	2	3	2	+1	8		2–0	—	0–0	—	—	0–0	—
6	Artigas	6	1	1	4	8	12	−4	4		0–3	—	1–2	—	—	—	5–2
7	Cerrito	6	1	0	5	7	14	−7	3		—	1–2	—	1–3	1–0	—	—

Source: Tenfield, Soccerway
Legend: Blue = home team win; Yellow = draw; Red = away team win.
Rules for classification: 1) Points, 2) Goal difference, 3) Goals scored, 4) Head-to-head points, 5) Head-to-head goal difference, 6) Head-to-head goals scored.

=== Serie B ===
Pos	Team	Pld	W	D	L	GF	GA	GD	Pts	Qualification	TAC	ORI	DMA	COL	FEN	LLU	RAM
1	Tacuarembó	6	4	2	0	7	3	+4	14	Advance to Final	—	—	—	1–0	—	1–1	1–0
2	Oriental	6	3	3	0	6	3	+3	12		2–2	—	0–0	—	1–0	—	—
3	Deportivo Maldonado	6	3	2	1	9	5	+4	11		0–1	—	—	2–0	—	4–4	—
4	Colón	6	2	1	3	11	6	+5	7		—	0–1	—	—	—	1–1	8–0
5	Fénix	6	2	0	4	4	6	−2	6		0–1	—	0–2	1–2	—	—	—
6	La Luz	6	0	4	2	7	10	−3	4		—	1–2	—	—	0–2	—	0–0
7	Rampla Juniors	6	0	2	4	0	11	−11	2		—	0–0	0–1	—	0–1	—	—

Source: Tenfield, Soccerway
Legend: Blue = home team win; Yellow = draw; Red = away team win.
Rules for classification: 1) Points, 2) Goal difference, 3) Goals scored, 4) Head-to-head points, 5) Head-to-head goal difference, 6) Head-to-head goals scored.

=== Final ===
4 May 2025
13:30 UTC−3

Tacuarembó	1–0	Atenas
Sosa 24'	Report

Parque Palermo, Montevideo
Referee: Daniel Rodríguez

== Regular stage ==
In the regular stage, the 14 teams played each other twice under a double round-robin format for a total of 26 matches. Teams carried over their Torneo Competencia performances to this stage. The top two teams at the end of the regular stage were promoted to the Uruguayan Primera División, while the Torneo Competencia winner and the teams placing from third to fifth place (or sixth place if the Torneo Competencia winner placed in the top five) advanced to the promotion play-offs to decide the last promoted team.

=== Standings ===
Pos	Team	Pld	W	D	L	GF	GA	GD	Pts	Promotion or qualification
1	Albion (C, P)	32	18	7	7	39	21	+18	61	Promotion to Primera División
2	Central Español (P)	32	16	10	6	37	22	+15	58	Promotion to Primera División
3	Atenas	32	17	6	9	42	26	+16	57	Advance to Promotion play-offs
4	Colón	32	15	9	8	43	23	+20	54	Advance to Promotion play-offs
5	Deportivo Maldonado (O, P)	32	14	9	9	40	26	+14	51	Advance to Promotion play-offs
6	Tacuarembó	32	13	12	7	35	28	+7	51	Advance to Promotion play-offs
7	Oriental	32	13	11	8	38	32	+6	50	
8	Rentistas	32	12	8	12	36	35	+1	44	
9	Fénix	32	12	7	13	35	36	−1	43	
10	La Luz	32	5	16	11	33	46	−13	31	
11	Rampla Juniors	31	7	7	17	22	39	−17	28	
12	Artigas	31	5	11	15	36	53	−17	26	
13	Cerrito	32	6	8	18	27	50	−23	26	
14	Uruguay Montevideo	32	7	5	20	24	50	−26	26	

Source: Tenfield
Rules for classification: 1) Points, 2) Playoff series (if needed to decide promotion), 3) Goal difference, 4) Goals for, 5) Head-to-head points, 6) Head-to-head goals scored, 7) Playoff game, in case two teams are still tied for first place.
(C) Champions; (O) Play-off winners; (P) Promoted

=== Results ===
Home \ Away	ALB	ART	ATE	CEN	CER	COL	DMA	FEN	LLU	ORI	RAM	REN	TAC	URU
Albion	—	3–2	2–1	0–0	0–0	0–2	1–0	2–0	3–0	1–0	2–1	4–1	1–0	0–1
Artigas	0–1	—	1–7	1–2	2–2	2–0	1–1	0–2	1–1	1–2	0–1	1–2	1–1	1–1
Atenas	0–1	1–1	—	0–1	3–0	1–1	1–1	1–0	2–3	1–2	1–0	0–2	1–0	1–0
Central Español	1–1	0–0	0–1	—	3–0	0–0	0–2	2–1	0–0	2–1	4–1	1–0	1–1	1–0
Cerrito	1–0	0–2	0–3	0–1	—	1–2	0–1	2–2	1–0	2–3	1–0	1–2	1–1	2–1
Colón	2–1	1–1	0–1	0–0	1–0	—	0–0	1–3	1–0	0–0	1–1	4–0	2–0	5–1
Deportivo Maldonado	0–1	6–1	0–1	0–0	1–0	0–2	—	0–2	1–1	3–0	1–0	1–1	2–0	3–0
Fénix	0–3	1–3	1–2	2–0	3–2	0–1	1–1	—	0–2	2–1	1–1	0–0	4–2	2–0
La Luz	1–0	1–1	1–1	0–4	2–2	0–1	1–2	2–2	—	1–1	1–1	2–0	1–2	1–0
Oriental	0–0	2–1	1–1	2–3	1–1	1–0	0–1	2–0	2–2	—	0–1	2–1	1–0	1–1
Rampla Juniors	0–1	— (Note: The match between Rampla Juniors and Artigas, scheduled for the final round of the regular stage, was cancelled per request from both clubs.)	1–2	0–1	0–0	1–0	2–1	0–1	4–0	1–2	—	2–1	1–1	1–0
Rentistas	2–2	0–0	2–0	1–1	0–1	1–2	3–0	0–0	3–2	2–0	1–0	—	3–1	1–3
Tacuarembó	2–0	2–0	1–0	0–0	2–0	2–2	1–0	0–0	1–1	1–1	3–1	2–1	—	2–0
Uruguay Montevideo	0–3	1–4	1–2	2–1	0–0	0–1	1–3	0–1	0–0	0–4	2–1	1–3	0–0	—

Source: Soccerway
Legend: Blue = home team win; Yellow = draw; Red = away team win.

== Promotion play-offs ==
=== Bracket ===
Semi-finals
Deportivo Maldonado	1	1	2
Colón	1	0	1
Tacuarembó	1	2	3
Atenas (bsr)	1	2	3

Finals
Deportivo Maldonado	0	1	1
Atenas	0	0	0

=== Semi-finals ===
==== First leg ====
8 November 2025
09:45 UTC−3

Deportivo Maldonado	1–1	Colón
Noble 76'	Report	Ferreira 55'

Estadio Domingo Burgueño, Maldonado
Referee: Pablo Silveira

8 November 2025
21:05 UTC−3

Tacuarembó	1–1	Atenas
González 90+5'	Report	Quintana 29' (pen.)

Estadio Raúl Goyenola, Tacuarembó
Referee: Juan Cianni

==== Second leg ====
15 November 2025
16:30 UTC−3

Colón	0–1	Deportivo Maldonado
	Report	Noble 76' (pen.)

Parque Palermo, Montevideo
Referee: Santiago Motta

Deportivo Maldonado won 2–1 on aggregate.

15 November 2025
19:00 UTC−3

Atenas	2–2	Tacuarembó
Fagúndez 5' (o.g.); Prado 86'	Report	Machado 3'; González 77'

Estadio Domingo Burgueño, Maldonado
Referee: Augusto Olmos

Tied 3–3 on aggregate. Atenas advanced on better season record.

=== Final ===
22 November 2025
18:00 UTC−3

Deportivo Maldonado	0–0	Atenas
	Report

Estadio Domingo Burgueño, Maldonado
Referee: Bruno Sacarelo

29 November 2025
20:30 UTC−3

Atenas	0–1	Deportivo Maldonado
	Report	Tolosa 90+4'

Estadio Domingo Burgueño, Maldonado
Referee: Felipe Vikonis

Deportivo Maldonado won 1–0 on aggregate and promoted to the Liga AUF Uruguaya.

== Top scorers ==
Rank	Player	Club	Goals
1	(Uruguay) Maximiliano Noble	Deportivo Maldonado	15
2	(Uruguay) Maicol Ferreira	Colón	13
2	(Uruguay) Ramiro Quintana	Atenas	13
4	(Uruguay) Diego Vera	Atenas	11
4	(Uruguay) Horacio Sequeira	La Luz	11
6	(Uruguay) Gastón Colmán	Oriental	10
7	(Uruguay) Renato César	Deportivo Maldonado	9
7	(Uruguay) Nicolás Leites	Artigas	9
9	(Uruguay) Carlos Sánchez	Rentistas	8
9	(Uruguay) Gonzalo Barreto	Rentistas	8

Source: Besoccer

== Relegation ==
Pos	Team	2024 Pts	2025 Pts	Total Pts	Total Pld	Avg	Relegation
1	Central Español	—	58	58	32	1.813	
2	Colón	52	54	106	64	1.656	
3	Albion	44	61	105	64	1.641	
4	Deportivo Maldonado	—	50	50	31	1.613	
5	Oriental	44	50	94	64	1.469	
6	Atenas	34	57	91	64	1.422	
7	Rentistas	45	44	89	64	1.391	
8	Fénix	—	43	43	32	1.344	
9	Tacuarembó	32	51	83	64	1.297	
10	Uruguay Montevideo	54	26	80	64	1.25	
11	Cerrito	46	26	72	64	1.125	
12	La Luz	35	31	66	64	1.031	
13	Rampla Juniors (R)	—	28	28	31	0.903	Relegation to Primera División Amateur
14	Artigas (R)	—	26	26	31	0.839	Relegation to Primera División Amateur

Source: Tenfield

== See also ==
- 2025 Uruguayan Primera División season
- 2025 Copa Uruguay
