= Hernán Petryk =

Uruguayan footballer (born 1994)

Personal information
- Full name: Rodrigo Hernán Petryk Vidal
- Date of birth: 21 October 1994 (age 32)
- Place of birth: Punta del Este, Uruguay
- Height: 1.86 m (6 ft 1 in)
- Position: Defender

Team information
- Current team: Deportivo Maldonado
- Number: 32

Senior career*
Years	Team	Apps	(Gls)
2013–2016	Atenas	35	(0)
2016–2021	Peñarol	21	(1)
2018	→ Chacarita Juniors (loan)	11	(1)
2018–2019	→ San Martín (loan)	20	(0)
2020–2021	→ Wanderers (loan)	12	(0)
2021	Wanderers	27	(0)
2022	Delfín	14	(0)
2022–2023	Montevideo City Torque	42	(0)
2024–	Deportivo Maldonado	16	(0)
- * Club domestic league appearances and goals as of 15 September 2024

Rodrigo Hernán Petryk Vidal (Spanish pronunciation: [roˈðɾiɣo eɾˈnam ˈpetɾiɡ biˈðal]; born 21 October 1994) is a Uruguayan professional footballer who plays as a defender for Deportivo Maldonado.

== Career ==
Petryk's career began in 2013 with Atenas, with the defender featuring for the Uruguayan Segunda División club in the 2013–14 campaign. His professional debut arrived on 12 October 2013 during a draw away to Canadian. Atenas finished 2013–14 second which secured promotion to the 2014–15 Uruguayan Primera División, a season in which Petryk subsequently made eleven appearances in. January 2016 saw Petryk join fellow top-flight team Peñarol. He scored his first senior goal for the club on 27 May 2017 during a 3–0 home victory against Fénix, in a season that ended with the league title.

Argentine Primera División side Chacarita Juniors loaned Petryk in January 2018. One goal, versus Vélez Sarsfield, in twelve appearances followed. After Chacarita Juniors were relegated at the conclusion of 2017–18, Petryk returned to Peñarol prior to departing on loan to Argentina once again on 3 August 2018; signing for newly promoted San Martín of the Argentine Primera División. He was selected by interim manager Ariel Martos for the first time on 23 September against Argentinos Juniors.

== Personal life ==
Born in Uruguay, Petryk is of Polish descent.

== Career statistics ==
As of 12 July 2019.

Club statistics
Club	Season	League			Cup		League Cup		Continental		Other		Total	
Club	Season	Division	Apps	Goals	Apps	Goals	Apps	Goals	Apps	Goals	Apps	Goals	Apps	Goals
Atenas	2013–14	Segunda División	24	0	—		—		—		0	0	24	0
Atenas	2014–15	Uruguayan Primera División	11	0	—		—		—		0	0	11	0
Atenas	2015–16	Segunda División	0	0	—		—		—		0	0	0	0
Atenas	Total		35	0	—		—		—		0	0	35	0
Peñarol	2015–16	Uruguayan Primera División	0	0	—		—		0	0	0	0	0	0
Peñarol	2016	Uruguayan Primera División	0	0	—		—		0	0	0	0	0	0
Peñarol	2017	Uruguayan Primera División	21	1	—		—		5 (Note: Appearance(s) in the Copa Libertadores)	0	0	0	26	1
Peñarol	2018	Uruguayan Primera División	0	0	—		—		0	0	0	0	0	0
Peñarol	2019	Uruguayan Primera División	0	0	—		—		0	0	0	0	0	0
Peñarol	Total		21	1	—		—		5	0	0	0	26	1
Chacarita Juniors (loan)	2017–18	Argentine Primera División	11	1	1	0	—		—		0	0	12	1
San Martín (loan)	2018–19	Argentine Primera División	20	0	0	0	2	0	—		0	0	22	0
Career total			87	2	1	0	2	0	5	0	0	0	95	2

== Honours ==
Peñarol

- Uruguayan Primera División: 2017
