= Cairus =

Cairus is a surname. Notable people with the surname include:

- Felipe Cairus (born 2000), Uruguayan footballer
- Renzo Cairus (born 1990), Uruguayan beach volleyball player
