= Matías de los Santos (footballer, born 1998) =

Uruguayan footballer

Personal information
- Full name: Marcos Matías de los Santos Morales
- Date of birth: 28 September 1998 (age 28)
- Place of birth: Artigas, Uruguay
- Height: 1.76 m (5 ft 9 in)
- Position: Midfielder

Team information
- Current team: La Luz
- Number: 8

Youth career
- Peñarol

Senior career*
Years	Team	Apps	(Gls)
2018–2022	Peñarol	29	(2)
2021	→ Deportivo Maldonado (loan)	17	(0)
2022	Villa Española	11	(1)
2023–	La Luz	39	(1)
- * Club domestic league appearances and goals as of 7 September 2024

Marcos Matías de los Santos Morales (born 28 September 1998) is a Uruguayan professional footballer who plays as a midfielder for Uruguayan Segunda División club La Luz.

== Career ==
=== Peñarol ===
A graduate of the club's youth academy, de los Santos made his professional debut for Peñarol on 7 June 2018, coming on as a 57th-minute substitute for Fabián Estoyanoff in a 3-1 victory over Defensor Sporting. The following season, he scored his first goal for the club as part of a brace in a 3-3 draw with Racing Club.

=== Deportivo Maldonado ===
In April 2021, de los Santos was loaned out to Deportivo Maldonado after seeing a reduction in his playing time at Peñarol. He made his debut for the club on 16 May 2021, coming on as a halftime substitute for Rodrigo Muniz in a 4-2 defeat to Liverpool.

== Career statistics ==
=== Club ===
As of match played 13 June 2021

Appearances and goals by club, season and competition
Club	Season	League			Cup		Continental		Other		Total	
Club	Season	Division	Apps	Goals	Apps	Goals	Apps	Goals	Apps	Goals	Apps	Goals
Peñarol	2018	Uruguayan Primera División	1	0	—	—	—	—	—	—	1	0
Peñarol	2019	Uruguayan Primera División	14	2	—	—	1 (Note: Appearance in the Copa Sudamericana)	0	2 (Note: Appearances in the Uruguayan Primera División Torneo Clausura decider and Championship play-off)	0	17	2
Peñarol	2020	Uruguayan Primera División	12	0	—	—	2 (Note: Appearances in the Copa Libertadores)	0	—	—	14	0
Peñarol	Total		27	2	—	—	3	0	2	0	32	2
Deportivo Maldonado (loan)	2021	Uruguayan Primera División	5	0	—	—	—	—	—	—	5	0
Career total			32	2	—	—	3	0	2	0	37	2
