= Matías de los Santos =

Matías de los Santos may refer to:

- Matías de los Santos (footballer, born 1992), Uruguayan centre-back
- Matías de los Santos (footballer, born 1998), Uruguayan midfielder
