= Joaquín Gottesman =

Uruguayan footballer (born 1996)

Personal information
- Full name: Joaquín Gottesman Villanueva
- Date of birth: 5 February 1996 (age 30)
- Place of birth: Buenos Aires, Argentina
- Height: 1.75 m (5 ft 9 in)
- Position: Midfielder

Team information
- Current team: Magallanes
- Number: 11

Youth career
- Nacional

Senior career*
Years	Team	Apps	(Gls)
2017–2021	Progreso	105	(12)
2019	→ Correcaminos UAT (loan)	1	(0)
2019	→ Atlético Huila (loan)	2	(0)
2022	Sud América	19	(0)
2023	Uruguay Montevideo	30	(2)
2024–	Magallanes	6	(0)
- * Club domestic league appearances and goals as of 17 April 2024

Joaquín Gottesman Villanueva (born 5 February 1996) is a Uruguayan professional footballer who plays as a midfielder for Chilean club Magallanes.

== Career ==
Formed in academy of Nacional, Gottesman joined Progreso prior to 2017 season. He made his senior debut on 15 April 2017 in a 0–0 draw against Rentistas. He scored his first goal on 27 May 2017 in a 4–0 win against Villa Teresa.

Gottesman spent 2019 season on loan at Mexican second division club Correcaminos UAT and Colombian top division side Atlético Huila.

In 2024, he moved to Chile and joined Magallanes in the Primera B.

== Personal life ==
He is the younger brother of fellow footballer Julián Gottesman.

== Career statistics ==
As of 11 February 2021

Appearances and goals by club, season and competition
Club	Season	League			Cup		Continental		Total	
Club	Season	Division	Apps	Goals	Apps	Goals	Apps	Goals	Apps	Goals
Progreso	2017	Uruguayan Segunda División	31	5	—		—		31	5
Progreso	2018	Uruguayan Primera División	29	4	—		—		29	4
Progreso	2020	Uruguayan Primera División	22	3	—		2 (Note: Appearances in Copa Libertadores.)	0	24	3
Progreso	Total		82	12	0	0	2	0	84	12
Correcaminos UAT (loan)	2018–19	Ascenso MX	1	0	1	0	—		2	0
Atlético Huila (loan)	2019	Categoría Primera A	2	0	—		—		2	0
Career total			85	12	1	0	2	0	88	12
