= Rodrigo Muniz =

Rodrigo Muniz may refer to:

- Rodrigo Muniz (Brazilian footballer) (born 2001), Brazilian footballer who plays for Fulham
- Rodrigo Muniz (Uruguayan footballer) (born 2001), Uruguayan footballer who plays for Deportivo Maldonado
