= Mariano Corsico =

Argentine footballer

Personal information
- Full name: Mariano Corsico
- Date of birth: May 9, 1981 (age 45)
- Place of birth: Córdoba, Argentina
- Height: 1.82 m (6 ft 0 in)
- Position: Defensive midfielder

Team information
- Current team: Deportivo Maldonado

Senior career*
Years	Team	Apps	(Gls)
2003–2004	Talleres de Córdoba	17	(1)
2004–2005	LB Châteauroux		
2005	Talleres de Córdoba		
2006	Sport Boys	6	(1)
2007	Municipal	11	(0)
2008	Olympiakos Nicosia		
2008–2009	FC Zwolle		
2015–	Deportivo Maldonado		
- * Club domestic league appearances and goals as of 8 September 2007

Mariano Corsico (born 9 May 1981) is an Argentine football player. He started his career with Argentine club Talleres Córdoba and played for Cypriot club Olympiakos Nicosia.
