= Sebastián Assis =

Uruguayan footballer (born 1993)

Personal information
- Full name: Alberto Sebastián Assis Silva
- Date of birth: 4 March 1993 (age 33)
- Place of birth: Tacuarembó, Uruguay
- Height: 1.71 m (5 ft 7 in)
- Position: Midfielder

Team information
- Current team: Cerro Largo
- Number: 15

Youth career
- Tacuarembó

Senior career*
Years	Team	Apps	(Gls)
2013–2017	Tacuarembó	72	(3)
2017–2020	Cerro Largo	82	(4)
2020	→ Unión Santa Fe (loan)	6	(0)
2021–2023	Orense	79	(3)
2024–	Cerro Largo	58	(3)
- * Club domestic league appearances and goals as of 1 October 2025

Alberto Sebastián Assis Silva (born 4 March 1993) is an Uruguayan professional footballer who plays as a midfielder for Cerro Largo.

== Professional career ==
Assis made his professional debut with Tacuarembó in a 2-1 Uruguayan Segunda División loss to Rocha on 13 October 2013. On 13 January 2020, Assis joined Unión Santa Fe on a one-year contract.
