= Nicolás Suárez (Uruguayan footballer) =

Uruguayan footballer (born 1999)

Personal information
- Full name: Óscar Nicolás Suárez León
- Date of birth: 13 April 1999 (age 27)
- Place of birth: Maldonado, Uruguay
- Height: 1.78 m (5 ft 10 in)
- Position: Forward

Youth career
- Deportivo Maldonado

Senior career*
| Years | Team | Apps | (Gls) |
| 2016–2020 | Deportivo Maldonado | 11 | (1) |
| 2020 | → Rocha (loan) | 15 | (1) |
| 2021 | Deportivo Colonia | | |
- * Club domestic league appearances and goals as of 12:45, 22 December 2020 (UTC)

Óscar Nicolás Suárez León (born 13 April 1999) is an Uruguayan footballer who plays as a forward.

== Career ==
=== Club career ===
Suárez got his official debut for Deportivo Maldonado in the Uruguayan Segunda División against C.A. Torque on 10 December 2016. He scored his first official goal for Maldonado on 6 July 2019 against Villa Española. Playing only 11 official games for Maldonado's first team, and the rest of the time, mostly for the U19s, Suárez left the club at the end of 2019.

In 2020, Suárez moved to fellow league club Rocha FC on loan for the whole year.
