= Sergio Cortelezzi =

Uruguayan footballer (born 1994)

Personal information
- Full name: Sergio Martín Cortelezzi Ferreyra
- Date of birth: 9 September 1994 (age 32)
- Place of birth: Florida, Uruguay
- Height: 1.83 m (6 ft 0 in)
- Position: Forward

Team information
- Current team: Huracan
- Number: 9

Youth career
- 2006–2012: Nacional
- 2013: Lecce

Senior career*
Years	Team	Apps	(Gls)
2014	Clodiense	11	(4)
2014–2015	Lugano	30	(10)
2015–2016	Chiasso	35	(6)
2016–2017	Le Mont	28	(3)
2017–2019	Wil	71	(19)
2019–20/2021–23	Bellinzona	60	(34)
2020–2021	Yverdon-Sport	22	(15)
2023–2024	Ceahlăul Piatra Neamț	14	(3)
2024–2024	Fénix	10	(0)
2025–	Huracan	36	(20)
Total		317	(114)

International career
2009	Uruguay U15	5	(3)
2011	Uruguay U17	8	(0)
Medal record
Representing Uruguay
Men's Football
FIFA U-17 World Cup
Runner-up	2011 Mexico
South American U-17 Championship
Runner-up	2011 Ecuador
- * Club domestic league appearances and goals as of 29 September 2025

Sergio Martín Cortelezzi Ferreyra (born 9 September 1994) is a Uruguayan footballer who plays for Uruguayan Primera División club Huracan.

== Career ==
Born in Florida, Uruguay, Cortelezzi came from the youth system of Nacional. He played in all categories and was top scorer in each of them. On 21 January 2011, he made his debut with the first team, on a summer friendly match against local rivals Peñarol, entering and scoring a goal. It was a dream debut for him. However, he never appeared in an official match with the first team.

In early 2013, after finishing his contract with Nacional, he emigrated to Italy to play for Lecce.

In December 2013, after not having chances with the first team, he was sent to Serie D side Clodiense. He played eleven matches and scored four goals.

In August 2014, he was transferred to Swiss Challenge League side Lugano.

On 25 June 2015, he signed a new deal with Chiasso.

In August 2016, he stayed in Switzerland and signed a new deal with Le Mont.

On 27 August 2021, he returned to Bellinzona.

== Honours ==
Lugano

- Swiss Challenge League: 2014–15

Uruguay U17

- FIFA U-17 World Cup runner-up: 2011
- South American Under-17 Football Championship runner-up: 2011
