= Ignacio Nicolini =

Uruguayan footballer (born 1988)

Personal information
- Full name: Ignacio Nicolini Díaz
- Date of birth: 30 September 1988 (age 38)
- Place of birth: Montevideo, Uruguay
- Height: 1.75 m (5 ft 9 in)
- Position: Midfielder

Team information
- Current team: Bella Vista

Senior career*
Years	Team	Apps	(Gls)
2009–2011	Bella Vista	63	(8)
2012–2014	Peñarol	10	(0)
2012	→ Bella Vista (loan)	13	(1)
2014	→ Cerro Largo (loan)	15	(0)
2014–2015	Racing CM	44	(1)
2016	Flamurtari Vlorë	18	(0)
2016–2017	Monopoli	36	(0)
2017–2020	Racing de Montevideo	74	(2)
2020–2021	Maldonado	23	(1)
2021–2022	Santa Rosa	17	(1)
2022–	Bella Vista	0	(0)
- * Club domestic league appearances and goals

Ignacio Nicolini (born 30 September 1988) is a Uruguayan footballer who plays as midfielder for Bella Vista.
