= Renzo Sánchez =

Uruguayan footballer (born 2004)

Personal information
- Full name: Renzo Sánchez Veiga
- Date of birth: 17 February 2004 (age 22)
- Place of birth: Rocha, Uruguay
- Height: 1.72 m (5 ft 8 in)
- Position: Forward

Team information
- Current team: Nacional
- Number: 21

Youth career
- 2009–2019: Palermo FC
- 2019–2022: Nacional

Senior career*
Years	Team	Apps	(Gls)
2022–	Nacional	7	(0)
2025–	→ CA Juventud (loan)	3	(0)

International career
2022–2023	Uruguay U20	26	(5)
2024	Uruguay U23	5	(1)
Medal record
Men's football
Representing Uruguay
South American U-20 Championship
Runner-up	2023 Colombia
- * Club domestic league appearances and goals as of 10 March 2024

Renzo Sánchez Veiga (born 17 February 2004) is a Uruguayan professional footballer who plays as a forward for Nacional.

== Early life ==
Born in Rocha, Renzo Sánchez first played with local club Palermo FC before joining the Club Nacional de Football ahead of the 2020 season, as he was also scouted by Argentine club River Plate.

== Club career ==
Sánchez made his first team debut during the 2022 pre-season friendlies, before signing his first contract with Club Nacional.

Having fully moved to the first team during the summer, Sánchez made his professional debut for Nacional on 22 September 2022, coming on as a second-half substitute for Santiago Ramírez in the 3–0 Copa Uruguay away defeat to Rampla Juniors.

== International career ==
In September 2022, Sánchez was called up to the Uruguay under-20 team for the first time, to take part in the South American Games. On 3 January 2023, he was called up by Marcelo Broli for the South American Under-20 Championship, which his team finished second.

In January 2024, Sánchez was named in Uruguay's squad for the 2024 CONMEBOL Pre-Olympic Tournament.

== Style of play ==
Coming through the Palermo academy as a central midfielder, Sánchez later developed himself as a more offensive potential by playing as a winger on both flanks, as an attacking midfielder or even a striker.

== Honours ==
=== Club ===
Nacional

- Uruguayan Primera División: 2022

=== International ===
Uruguay

- South American U-20 Championship Runner-up: 2023
