= Felipe Cairus =

Uruguayan footballer (born 2000)

Personal information
- Full name: Felipe Cairus Arabeity
- Date of birth: 28 April 2000 (age 26)
- Place of birth: Dolores, Uruguay
- Height: 1.77 m (5 ft 10 in)
- Position: Midfielder

Team information
- Current team: Godoy Cruz
- Number: 8

Senior career*
Years	Team	Apps	(Gls)
2019	Albion	3	(0)
2020–2025	Nacional	11	(1)
2023	→ Rentistas (loan)	29	(3)
2025–2026	Racing Club Montevideo	42	(1)
2026–	Godoy Cruz	18	(0)
- * Club domestic league appearances and goals as of 21:10, 19 November 2026 (UTC)

Felipe Cairus Arabeity (born 28 April 2000) is a Uruguayan professional footballer who plays as a midfielder for Godoy Cruz Antonio Tomba.

== Career ==
=== Nacional ===
Born in Dolores in Soriano Department, Cairus began his career with Albion F.C. and played three games in the Uruguayan Segunda División in 2019, before being loaned to Club Nacional de Football at the turn of the year. In 2021, he suffered a knee injury that lasted for nine months, causing him to contemplate retirement.

On 7 September 2022, Cairus made his first-team debut by starting in a 1–0 win away to Miramar Misiones in the last 32 of the Copa Uruguay. He was made captain of Nacional's third team under manager Álvaro Recoba, and signed a two-year contract in January 2023. The following month, he was one of eight Nacional players and some coaching staff to be loaned to C.A. Rentistas due to an agreement between the two clubs.

On 2 March 2024, Cairus made his Uruguayan Primera División debut under Recoba in a 3–0 home win over Montevideo Wanderers. He played the final 16 minutes as a substitute and scored within three minutes.

=== Racing Club ===
At the end of 2024, Cairus left Nacional for Racing Club de Montevideo. He scored his first goal for the club on 25 September 2025 in a 4–1 home win over Club Atlético Universitario in the quarter-finals of the Copa Uruguay, and his only league goal came the following 14 March as the only one of a win away to Boston River. His team won the Apertura of the 2026 season.

=== Godoy Cruz ===
Cairus moved abroad for the first time in his career on 6 July 2026, joining Godoy Cruz in Argentina's Primera Nacional. He made his debut on 12 November in a 1–0 win at home to Defensores de Belgrano, playing the last 22 minutes as a substitute for goalscorer Benjamín Schamine, and played 18 games in his first half-season as the team from Mendoza won promotion as champions.

== Personal life ==
As of May 2024, Cairus was studying a degree in business administration at Universidad ORT Uruguay.
