= Gastón Colmán =

Uruguayan footballer (born 1989)

Personal information
- Full name: Heber Gastón Colmán Leguisamo
- Date of birth: 9 April 1989 (age 37)
- Place of birth: Tacuarembó, Uruguay
- Height: 1.83 m (6 ft 0 in)
- Position: Forward

Team information
- Current team: Progreso
- Number: 11

Youth career
- Defensor Sporting

Senior career*
Years	Team	Apps	(Gls)
2009	Olimpia		
2011–2014	Tacuarembó	74	(27)
2014–2017	Sud América	97	(22)
2016	→ Atlético de Rafaela (loan)	9	(0)
2018	Progreso	31	(9)
2019	Santa Tecla	19	(4)
2019–2020	Tacuarembó	31	(9)
2021–	Progreso	103	(17)
- * Club domestic league appearances and goals as of 14 September 2024

Heber Gastón Colmán Leguisamo (born 4 April 1989) is a Uruguayan professional footballer who plays as a forward for Uruguayan Primera División club Progreso.

== Career ==
At the age of 20, Colmán signed for Olimpia, Paraguay's most successful club, where he suffered a knee injury, causing him to be sidelined for nine months.

Before the second half of 2010–11, Colmán signed for Tacuarembó in Uruguay.

Before the 2016 season, he was sent on loan to Argentine side Atlético de Rafaela, where he found the football "much more dynamic" and made 9 league appearances and scored 0 goals.

Before the second half of 2018–19, Colmán signed for Santa Tecla in El Salvador.

In 2019, he returned to Uruguayan Segunda División team Tacuarembó.
