= Gonzalo Sosa (footballer, born 2005) =

Argentine footballer

Personal information
- Full name: Gonzalo Sebastián Sosa
- Date of birth: 5 March 2005 (age 21)
- Place of birth: Buenos Aires, Argentina
- Position: Midfielder

Team information
- Current team: Deportivo Maldonado (on loan from Racing)
- Number: 27

Youth career
- Boca Juniors
- Defensa y Justicia
- Racing

Senior career*
Years	Team	Apps	(Gls)
2026–	Racing	3	(0)
2026–	→ Deportivo Maldonado (loan)	7	(0)
- * Club domestic league appearances and goals as of 18:05, 4 October 2026 (UTC)

Gonzalo Sebastián Sosa (born 5 March 2005) is an Argentine footballer currently playing as a midfielder for Uruguayan club Deportivo Maldonado, on loan from Racing.

== Club career ==
Born in Buenos Aires, Sosa started his career with Boca Juniors. After his parents no longer had the time or money to take him to Boca, he joined Defensa y Justicia, but this too was short-lived, and he joined Racing Club in exchange for ten footballs.

He has been linked with a move to numerous top European clubs, with Barcelona, Real Madrid and Paris Saint-Germain having been touted as potential suitors. Manchester City, Manchester United and Bayern Munich have also been linked with Sosa.

== Style of play ==
A fast-paced attacking midfielder, he has drawn comparisons with former Argentine international Juan Román Riquelme, with Sosa himself stating that he liked the former playmaker.
