= Copa Uruguay =

- Organiser(s): AUF
- Founded: 20 April 2022; 4 years ago
- Region: Uruguay
- Teams: 32
- Qualifier for: Copa Libertadores; Supercopa Uruguaya (TBC)
- Current champions: Peñarol (1st title)
- Most championships: Defensor Sporting (3 titles)
- Website: AUF
- 2026 Copa Uruguay

The Copa Uruguay (officially Copa AUF Uruguay) is a knockout football competition in men's domestic Uruguayan football, starting in 2022.

The competition starts in August, with the winner of the cup qualifying for the following year's Copa Libertadores, starting from the 2025 edition. It is also planned to grant the winner a spot in the Supercopa Uruguaya in the future.

== History ==
Historically, Uruguayan football never had a national cup tournament, aside from a competition called Torneo de Copa, which happened only in 1969. In 2018, teams started to mobilize in favour of the creation of a national cup, but nothing came of it.

On 20 April 2022, the Uruguayan Football Association announced the creation of the Copa AUF Uruguay, being approved by several clubs involved. The first edition of the competition, which was played from 22 June to 13 November 2022, was won by Defensor Sporting who defeated La Luz in the final. Defensor Sporting also won the following two editions in 2023 and 2024, with Peñarol halting Defensor's streak by winning the competition in 2025.

== Format ==
For its first edition in 2022, the competition was divided into two stages: a preliminary stage and the national stage.

In the preliminary stage, teams from the amateur lower leagues competed for 20 berths to the national stage. In the first phase of the national stage, 24 teams from the Primera División Amateur and Segunda División entered the competition, for a total of 48 teams which were divided into 24 ties, with the winners qualifying for the second round. The 24 second round winners then advanced to play against each other to define 12 winners into the third phase.

Thirty-two teams played in the third phase: 12 winners from the previous phase, 16 professional teams from the Primera División, the best relegated team of Primera División the previous season, the defending champion of the Primera División Amateur and the defending champion and runner-up of the Copa Nacional de Clubes. From this point onwards, the winners played against each other in two-legged knockout phases, with the final being played as a single match on neutral ground.

Due to financial and scheduling constraints, starting from 2024 the number of participating teams was reduced to 32, with 10 Primera División, 6 Segunda División, 4 from Primera División Amateur, 2 from Divisional D, and 10 clubs from the Copa Nacional de Clubes (nine of which qualified after a preliminary competition) entering the cup. The 32 teams played a single-legged knockout tournament with the semi-finals and the final played on neutral ground.

The format was once again changed ahead of the 2026 edition, which was opened to 44 teams with the participation of all 16 top-tier teams, along with eight from Segunda División, eight from Primera División Amateur, two from Divisional D and 10 from the OFI's Copa Nacional de Clubes. Teams in the first two stages of the competition were split into two paths: one for professional sides featuring a group stage and another for amateur ones with a qualifying round for third division teams, with eight professional sides and eight amateur ones advancing to the round of 16 where they could be drawn against each other.

The winner of the competition is also awarded a US$ 100,000 prize, to be spent on infrastructure projects.

== Results ==
Ed.	Year	Champion	Score	Runner-up	Venue
1	2022	Defensor Sporting (1)	1–0	La Luz	Estadio Centenario, Montevideo
2	2023	Defensor Sporting (2)	2–2 (4–2 p)	Montevideo City Torque	Estadio Centenario, Montevideo
3	2024	Defensor Sporting (3)	2–2 (3–1 p)	Nacional	Estadio Centenario, Montevideo
4	2025	Peñarol (1)	2–0	Plaza Colonia	Estadio Centenario, Montevideo
5	2026				TBD

== Performance by club ==
Club	Winners	Runners-up	Winning years	Runners-up years
Defensor Sporting	3	0	2022, 2023, 2024	—
Peñarol	1	0	2025	—
La Luz	0	1	—	2022
Montevideo City Torque	0	1	—	2023
Nacional	0	1	—	2024
Plaza Colonia	0	1	—	2025
