= Estadio Ateniense =

Football stadium in San Carlos, Maldonado, Uruguay

- Estadio Atenas
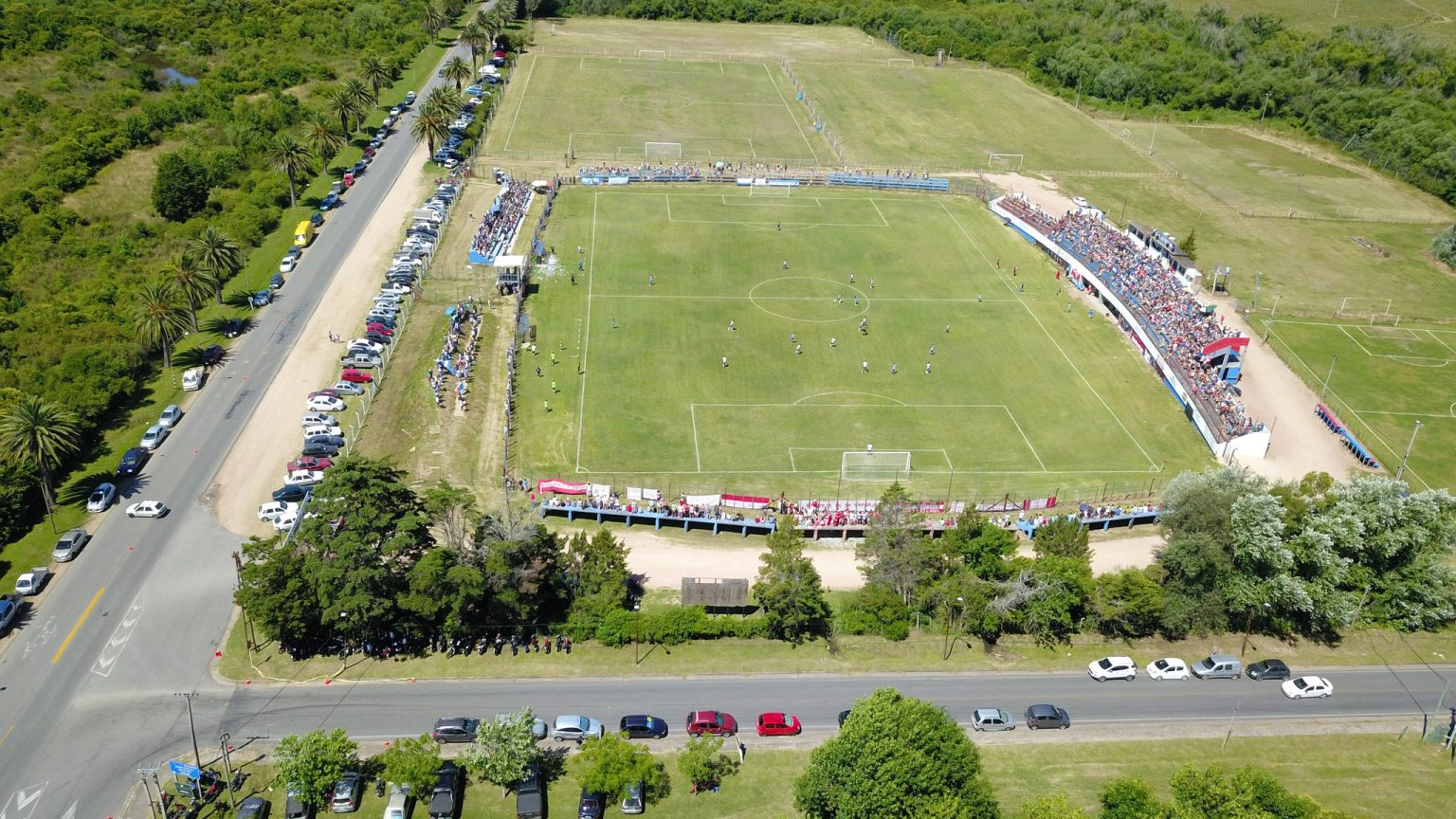
- Interactive map of Estadio Ateniense
- Address: San Carlos, Maldonado; Uruguay
- Coordinates: 34.7907°S 54.9008°W
- Owner: Club Atenas de San Carlos
- Operator: Club Atenas de San Carlos
- Capacity: 6,500 spectators
- Surface: Grass

Construction
- Built: 1954
- Opened: May 8, 1955
- Expanded: 1963

Tenant
- Club Atenas de San Carlos

Website
- clubatenas.uy

Estadio Ateniense, also known as Estadio Atenas, is a football stadium located in San Carlos, a city in the department of Maldonado, Uruguay. It serves as the home ground for the Club Atlético Atenas, a prominent football club in the region. The stadium is deeply connected to the club's history and is a significant venue for local football matches.

== History ==
The origins of Estadio Ateniense date back to 1954 when Club Atlético Atenas purchased a plot of land measuring approximately three hectares. This acquisition was driven by the need for a permanent venue after the club had to vacate its previous grounds. The decision to secure the land was made at a general assembly, and the property was purchased from Frigorífico del Este at a cost of 2,000 Uruguayan pesos per hectare.

The construction of the stadium began shortly thereafter, and it officially opened on May 8, 1955, with an inaugural friendly match between Atenas and Defensor de Maldonado. The game ended in a 4–3 victory for Atenas, with Julio Formoso scoring the first goal in the new venue.

In 1963, construction of the main grandstand began, aiming to transform the field into a full-fledged stadium. The project was overseen by a special committee led by club members and funded through a combination of fundraising efforts, including a car raffle and loans.

== Capacity and Features ==
Estadio Ateniense has a capacity of 6,500 spectators, making it one of the larger stadiums in the region. The stadium features:

- A main grandstand with seating sections of varying sizes.
- Locker rooms situated beneath the central section of the grandstand.
- A well-maintained playing field suitable for hosting local and regional competitions.

== Significance ==
Estadio Ateniense is a cornerstone of the local community in San Carlos. It has hosted numerous important matches, including games in the Uruguayan Segunda División, where Club Atlético Atenas frequently competes. Beyond football, the stadium has also been used for cultural and community events, cementing its status as a central hub for local activities.
