= Rodrigo Muniz (Uruguayan footballer) =

Uruguayan footballer (born 2001)

Personal information
- Full name: Rodrigo Ariel Muniz Menosse
- Date of birth: 1 September 2001 (age 25)
- Place of birth: Punta del Este, Uruguay
- Height: 1.77 m (5 ft 10 in)
- Position: Forward

Team information
- Current team: Deportivo Maldonado
- Number: 14

Youth career
- Deportivo Maldonado
- 2018–2019: → Pescara (loan)

Senior career*
Years	Team	Apps	(Gls)
2017–	Deportivo Maldonado	69	(9)
- * Club domestic league appearances and goals as of 15 September 2024

Rodrigo Ariel Muniz Menosse (born 1 September 2001) is a Uruguayan footballer who plays for Deportivo Maldonado.

== Career ==
Muniz started his career with Deportivo Maldonado in the Uruguayan first division.

In 2018, Muniz was sent on loan to the youth academy of Italian second division club Pescara.
