= Gustavo Alles =

Uruguayan footballer

Personal information
- Full name: Gustavo Javier Alles Vila
- Date of birth: 9 April 1990 (age 36)
- Place of birth: Montevideo, Uruguay
- Height: 1.91 m (6 ft 3 in)
- Position: Forward

Team information
- Current team: Progreso
- Number: 23

Youth career
- –2011: Defensor Sporting

Senior career*
Years	Team	Apps	(Gls)
2011–2012	Defensor Sporting	0	(0)
2011	→ Racing (loan)	10	(0)
2012–2013	Progreso	27	(9)
2013–2016	Liverpool	9	(0)
2014–2015	→ Rentistas (loan)	15	(3)
2015	→ Adana Demirspor (loan)	11	(2)
2015–2016	→ Rentistas (loan)	12	(0)
2016–2017	Juventud	25	(4)
2017	Sport Rosario	10	(2)
2018	Atlético Baleares	11	(1)
2018	Rentistas	11	(5)
2019	Progreso	31	(10)
2020	Deportivo Cuenca	3	(3)
2020	Progreso	11	(4)
2020–2021	Universidad de Concepción	12	(0)
2021	Progreso	23	(5)
2022	Gualaceo	22	(3)
2023	Fénix	26	(1)
2024	Nacional Potosí	6	(0)
2024–	Progreso	3	(0)
- * Club domestic league appearances and goals as of 14 September 2024

Gustavo Javier Alles Vila (born 9 April 1990) is a Uruguayan professional footballer who plays as a forward for Progreso.

== Career ==
Alles came through the youth levels of Defensor Sporting, but never played for the first team. In early 2011, he signed a one-year loan with Racing, where he played 10 matches in the Uruguayan Primera División.

On 26 August 2014, he scored a goal against Paraguayan side Cerro Porteño in the 2014 Copa Sudamericana, which was the first goal ever for Rentistas in an international competition.

In July 2013, Alles signed with Liverpool Montevideo.

On 2 February 2015, he signed on loan with Turkish side Adana Demirspor.

In 2024, Alles moved to Bolivia and joined Nacional Potosí.
