= Paysandú F.C. =

Uruguayan football club

Paysandú
- Full name: Paysandú Fútbol Club
- Nickname: Sanduceros
- Founded: March 7, 2003
- Ground: Estadio Parque Artigas; Paysandú, Uruguay
- Capacity: 25,000
- Chairman: Hector Lancieri
- Manager: Juan Silvera
- League: Segunda División
- 2025: 5
Home colours	Away colours

Paysandú Fútbol Club is a football club from Paysandú in Uruguay. They were formed in 2003, making them one of the newest professional football clubs in Uruguay. They were formed by the amalgamation of several local clubs.

They played in the Uruguayan Segunda División between 2003 and 2004, when they were promoted to the Uruguayan Primera División after achieving a third place finish; they played in it for two years before being relegated back to the Segunda División. They only played one further season of said league before folding.

Afterwards, in 2021 they were recreated as a club and started to play in the Uruguayan Primera División Amateur, which is the third division of the Uruguayan league system, and where they still play as of 2025.They were promoted to Segunda División for the 2026 season.
