= Colón F.C. =

Uruguayan football club

Colón
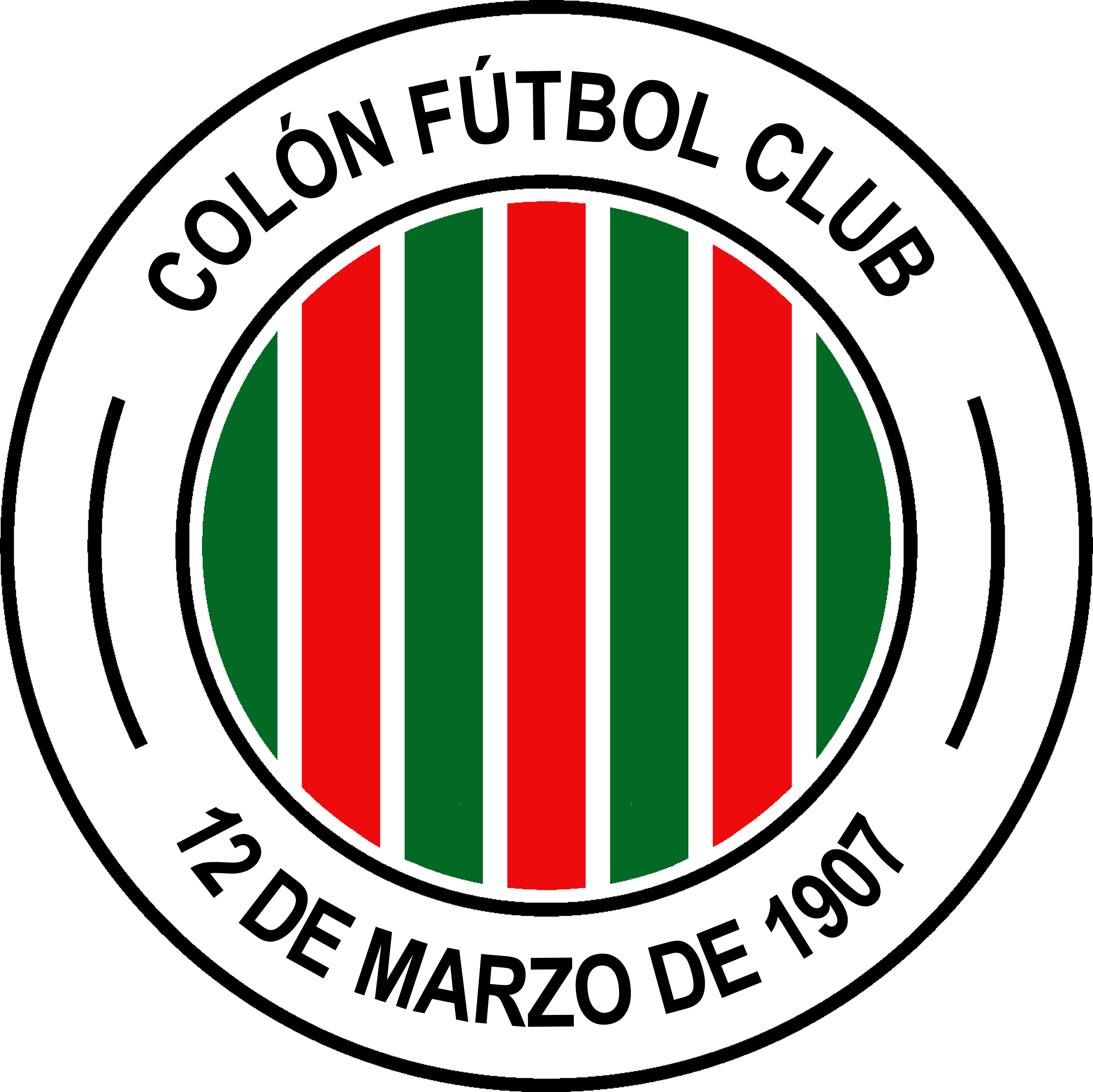
- Full name: Colón Fútbol Club
- Nicknames: El Verde; El tricolor de Brazo Oriental
- Founded: March 12, 1907; 118 years ago
- Ground: Estadio Parque Doctor Carlos Suero; Montevideo, Uruguay
- Capacity: 2.000
- Chairman: Marcelo Menoni
- Manager: Sergio Damián Santín
- League: Segunda División
- 2025: Segunda División, 4th of 14
- Website: http://colonfc.com/
Home colours	Away colours

Colón Fútbol Club is a football club from Montevideo in Uruguay. The club was established on March 12, 1907, and is affiliated with the Uruguayan Segunda División.

== Titles ==
- Segunda División (2): 1964, 1982
- Segunda División Amateur (2): 1988, 2000
- Divisional Intermedia (4): 1925, 1927, 1931, 1954
- División Extra (1): 1920
- Segunda División (1): 1908
- Liga Uruguaya de Football Amateur (1): 1933

== Women's team ==
The women's team of Colon has won four national championships from 2013 to 2016. They also played in the Copa Libertadores Femenina from 2014 to 2017, achieving a fourth place finish in 2016.
