= Estadio Parque Maracaná =

Football stadium in Casavalle, Montevideo, Uruguay

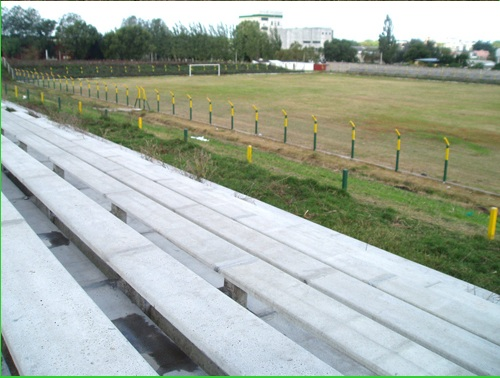
- Parque Maracaná
- Interactive map of Estadio Parque Maracaná
- Location: Montevideo, Uruguay
- Coordinates: 34°50′12.47″S 56°10′16.63″W
- Owner: Club Sportivo Cerrito
- Capacity: 8,000
- Surface: grass

Construction
- Opened: September 30, 2008

Tenant
- Club Sportivo Cerrito

The Estadio Parque Maracaná is a football stadium in Casavalle, Montevideo, Uruguay. It has a capacity of 8,000 and is the home stadium of Club Sportivo Cerrito. The stadium opened on Saturday 20 September 2008, with a match between Cerrito and Huracán Buceo in the Segunda División which Cerrito won 3 -0.
