= Uruguay Montevideo =

Uruguayan football club

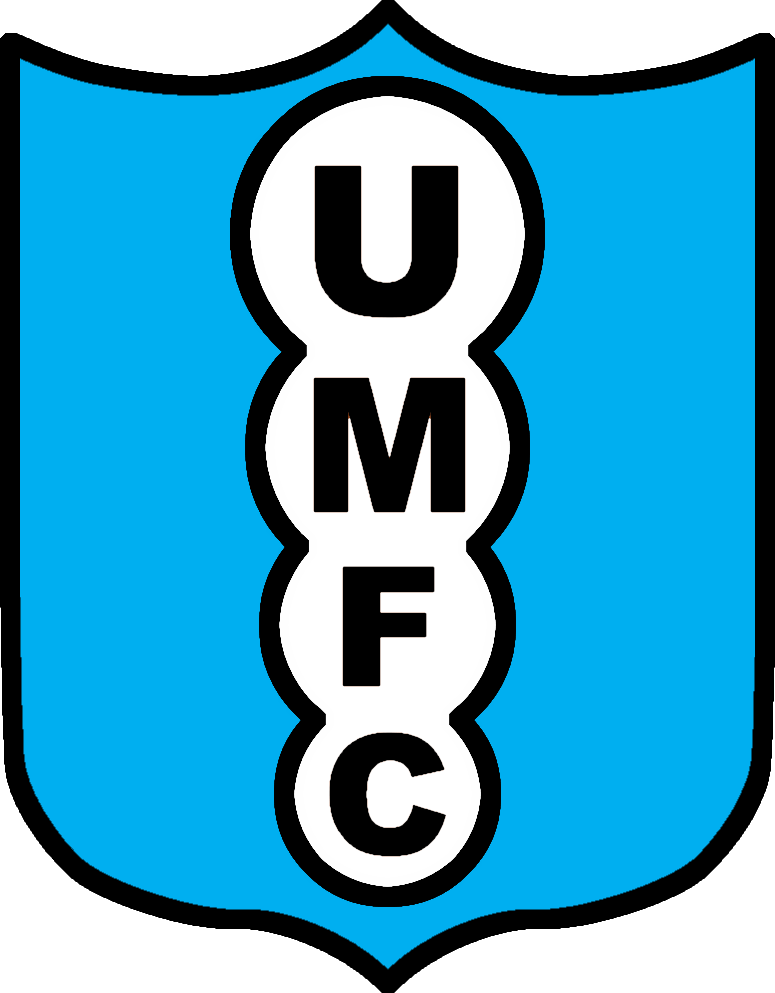
- Full name: Uruguay Montevideo Fútbol Club
- Nickname: Celestes
- Founded: January 5, 1921
- Ground: Parque ANCAP, Montevideo, Uruguay
- Capacity: 4,000
- Chairman: Daniel Chiffoni
- League: Segunda División
- 2025: Segunda División, 14th of 14
Home colours	Away colours

Uruguay Montevideo Football Club is a football club from Montevideo in Uruguay.

== Overview ==
The club were disaffiliated from the second professional division of the Uruguayan Football Association in 2007 and re-entered the league for 2008-2009 at the third level, which is the bottom and the only amateur level of the league's pyramid, named the Segunda División Amateur.

The club got their name from two ships from the Uruguayan Navy, called Destructor Uruguay and Destructor Montevideo.

== Titles ==
- Uruguayan Segunda División Amateur (2): 1993, 2002
- Divisional Intermedia (4): 1950, 1955, 1957, 1965
