= Club Oriental de Football =

Uruguayan football club

Oriental
- Full name: Club Oriental de Football
- Nicknames: El Celeste de la Paz, Paceños, El Orien
- Founded: June 14, 1924; 102 years ago
- Ground: Parque Oriental; La Paz, Uruguay
- Capacity: 700
- Chairman: Alejandro Villagra
- Manager: Fabián Avero
- League: Segunda División
- 2025: Segunda División, 7th of 14
Home colours	Away colours

Club Oriental de Football, sometimes referred to as Club Oriental de Fútbol, Club Oriental de La Paz, or simply Oriental, are a football club from La Paz, Uruguay. They currently play in the Uruguayan Segunda División Profesional, the second tier of the Uruguayan football league system.

== History ==
Founded in 1924, the club played in regional leagues in the early years of its existence, joining the Uruguayan Football Association in the 1970s. The club were champions of the Uruguayan Segunda División Amateur in 2004 and 2007, but at the time the champions were not automatically promoted. After the club won the title again in 2008-09, the Uruguayan Football Association granted promotion to the Uruguayan Segunda División Profesional; however, the club were unable to meet the financial requirements of the higher tier, ultimately not playing at all in the 2009-10 season. They re-entered the Segunda División Amateur for 2010-11. After winning that league again in 2014-15, they were able to successfully gain promotion to the Segunda División Profesional.

== Honours ==
- Segunda División Amateur Uruguay
  - Champions (4): 2004, 2007, 2008–09, 2014–15
