= Huracán F.C. =

Uruguayan football club

Huracán FC
- Full name: Huracán Fútbol Club
- Nicknames: El Hura, Tricolor del Paso
- Founded: 1 August 1954
- Ground: Parque Pedro Ángel Bossio, Montevideo, Uruguay
- Capacity: 2,000
- Chairman: Jorge Álvarez
- Coach: Juan Alberto Quintela
- League: Primera Divisional C (III)
Home colours	Away colours	Third colours

Huracán Fútbol Club, usually known simply as Huracán and sometimes called as Huracán del Paso de la Arena, is a Uruguayan football club based in Montevideo. It was founded in 1954.

== History ==
Huracán Fútbol Club was founded on August 1, 1954 through the merger of two clubs composed mainly of young students: the "Club Atlético Charrúa" and "La Esquinita Football Club". The new team's name was inspired by a former club "Huracán" that participated in Uruguayan leagues during the early 20th century. Colors adopted from Club Nacional de Football, because the founders were fans of this Uruguayan giant.

Club was affiliated to the AUF in 1962. Their highest performance was in 1991, when Huracán fought for promotion to Uruguayan Primera División. However, in the final game at home they lost 0:4 to Liverpool, while their opponents River Plate won in La Paz against Oriental, achieving promotion.

In 2010, Huracán achieved promotion from Segunda División Amateur (third level) and returns to the Professional Second Division of Uruguay.

From May to August 2011, Huracán merged with Club Atlético Torque and named Huracán Torque, but later this merge was dissolved. Huracán Torque never played in official games.

== Titles ==
- Segunda División Amateur de Uruguay (3): 1983, 1990, 2009/10
- Primera "D" (Uruguay) (1): 1978
