= Club Sportivo Cerrito =

Association football club in Uruguay

- Full name: Club Sportivo Cerrito
- Nicknames: Auriverde; Cerritenses; Gitanos
- Founded: October 28, 1929; 96 years ago
- Ground: Estadio Parque Maracaná
- Capacity: 8,000
- Chairman: Auro Acosta
- Manager: Roland Marcenaro
- League: Segunda División
- 2025: Segunda División, 13th of 14
Home colours	Away colours

Club Sportivo Cerrito, usually known simply as Cerrito, is a Uruguayan professional football club based in Cerrito, Montevideo. They currently play in the Uruguayan Segunda División.

== Titles ==
- Uruguayan Segunda División: 2

2003, 2020

- Tercera División Uruguay: 4

1951, 1970, 1982, 1998

== Rivalries ==
The neighborhood has two sports clubs, who share a large rivalry; the Clásico del Cerrito is contested with Rentistas.

== Managers ==
- (Uruguay) Luis López (1998–1999)
- (Uruguay) Marcelo Saralegui (2006–07)
- (Uruguay) Ricardo Ortíz (2006–07)
- (Uruguay) Jorge Barrios (2008–??)
- (Uruguay) Julio Balerio (July 2009 – Feb 10)
- (Uruguay) Marcelo Saralegui (2010–11)
