= Tacuarembó F.C. =

Uruguayan football club

Tacuarembó
- Full name: Tacuarembó Fútbol Club
- Nicknames: Rojiblancos, Tacua
- Founded: 11 November 1998; 27 years ago
- Ground: Estadio Ingeniero Raúl Goyenola, Tacuarembó, Uruguay
- Capacity: 12,000
- Chairman: Jorge Alonso
- Manager: Amaranto Abascal
- League: Segunda División
- 2025: Segunda División, 6th of 14
Home colours	Away colours

Tacuarembó Fútbol Club, usually known simply as Tacuarembó, is a Uruguayan football club based in Tacuarembó.

== History ==
Like the inner-country team Rocha, Tacuarembó is a super merge of 21 different clubs, and represents all of the department it is located in, except for the city of Paso de los Toros. The team was relegated to the Second Division after finishing 15th in the 2010–11 season.

== Current squad ==
As of 15 August 2024

Note: Flags indicate national team as defined under FIFA eligibility rules; some limited exceptions apply. Players may hold more than one non-FIFA nationality.

No.	Pos.	Nation	Player
1	GK	URU	Federico Pintado (on loan from Cerro Largo FC)
2	DF	ARG	Álvaro San Emeterio
—			
4	DF	URU	Luciano Piriz
5	MF	URU	Agustín Coitto
6	DF	URU	Mateo Pereyra
7	FW	URU	Alex Perdomo
8	FW	URU	Nicolás Mello
9	FW	BRA	Lucão
10	FW	COL	Nicolás González
11	FW	URU	Ian López
13	FW	URU	Diego Méndez
14	DF	URU	Lucas López
15	MF	URU	José Duarte

No.	Pos.	Nation	Player
16	DF	URU	Martín Marta
17	DF	URU	Enzo Acosta
18	MF	URU	Santiago Vargas
19	MF	URU	Leonardo Olavarría
20	FW	URU	Pablo López (footballer, born 1996)
21	DF	URU	Ayrton Castro
22	DF	URU	Claudio Dafonte
23	MF	URU	Joaquín Moreira
25	DF	URU	Federico Ferreira
26	MF	URU	Sebastián Píriz
30	MF	URU	Anderson Brum
31	FW	URU	Tizian Varela
32	GK	URU	Ángel Maciel
77	MF	URU	Esteban de Lima
90	FW	URU	Néstor Álvarez
