= Uruguayan Segunda División =

Segunda División Profesional
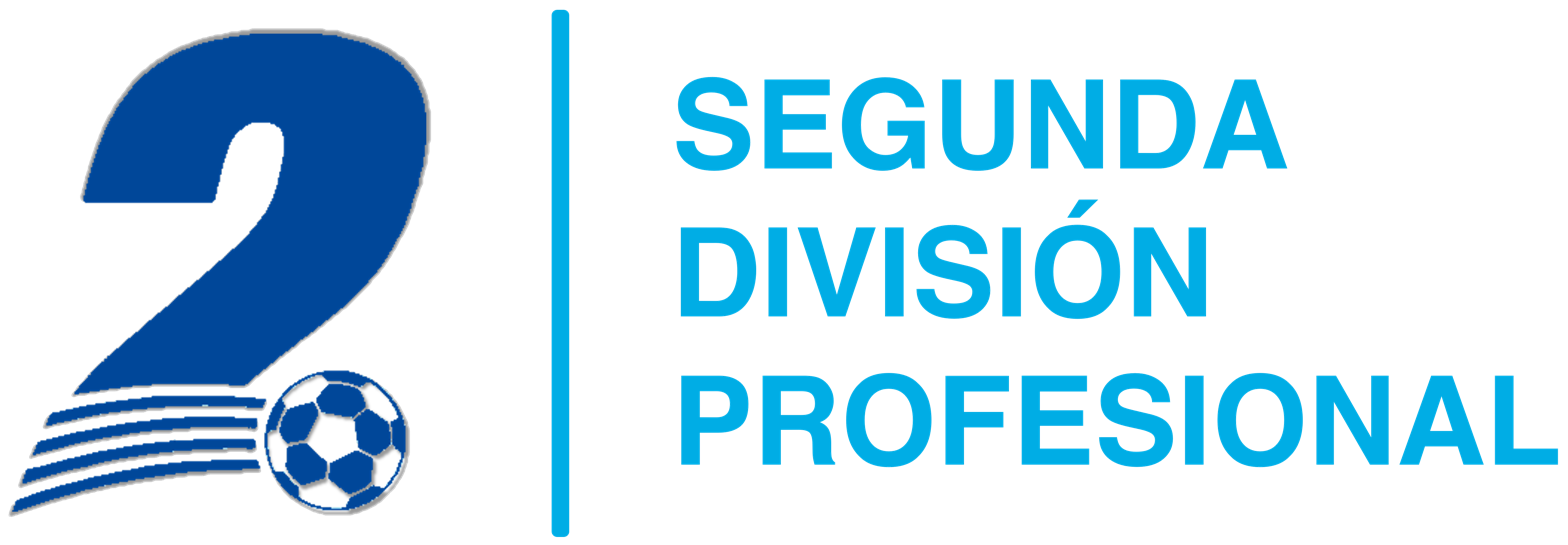
- Organising body: AUF
- Founded: 1942; 84 years ago
- Country: Uruguay
- Confederation: CONMEBOL
- Number of clubs: 14
- Level on pyramid: 2
- Promotion to: Primera División
- Relegation to: Primera División Amateur
- Current champions: Plaza Colonia (2nd title) (2026)
- Most championships: Fénix; Sud América (7 titles each)
- Broadcaster: Tenfield
- Website: Segunda División
- Current: 2026 season

The Segunda División Profesional is the second division of professional football in Uruguay, established in 1942. The league is sometimes referred to as Primera B. In 1942, the Segunda División was established to replace the amateur Divisional Intermedia, establishing a professional league for lower divisions in Uruguay.

The most successful clubs are Fénix and Sud América with seven titles. The current champion is Plaza Colonia.

== Format ==
After 1994, the competition was divided in two stages, called the Opening Championship (Torneo Apertura) and Closing Championship (Torneo Clausura), with a two-legged play-off between the best 4 teams in the aggregate table, not counting the champion and the runner-up who are promoted directly.

== 2026 season teams ==
Locations of the 2026 season teams outside Montevideo.
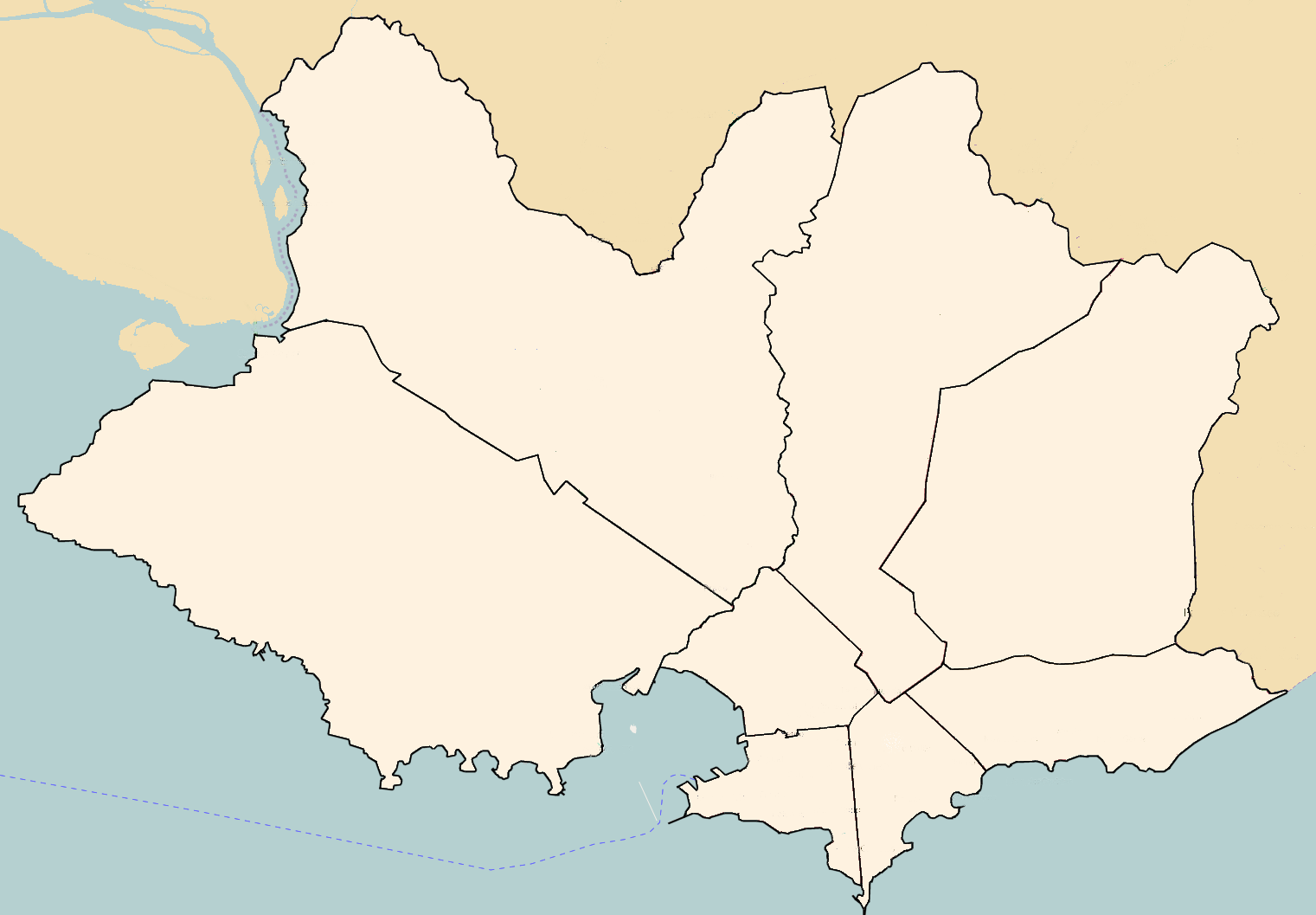
Locations of the 2026 Segunda División teams within Montevideo.

Club	City	Stadium	Capacity
Atenas	San Carlos	Atenas	6,000
Cerrito	Montevideo	Parque Maracaná	8,000
Colón	Montevideo	Parque Doctor Carlos Suero	2,000
Fénix	Montevideo	Parque Capurro	10,000
Huracán	Montevideo	Parque Pedro Ángel Bossio	2,000
La Luz	Montevideo	Parque Luis Rivero	4,000
Miramar Misiones	Montevideo	Parque Luis Méndez Piana	4,000
Oriental	La Paz	Parque Oriental	1,500
Paysandú	Paysandú	Parque Artigas	25,000
Plaza Colonia	Colonia	Juan Gaspar Prandi	4,500
Rentistas	Montevideo	Complejo Rentistas	10,600
River Plate	Montevideo	Parque Federico Omar Saroldi	6,000
Tacuarembó	Tacuarembó	Raúl Goyenola	12,000
Uruguay Montevideo	Montevideo	Parque ANCAP	4,000

== List of champions ==
Ed.	Season	Champion	Runner-up	Third place
Primera División B
1	1942	Miramar Misiones (1)	Progreso	Bella Vista
2	1943	River Plate (1)	Cerro	Progreso
3	1944	Rampla Juniors (1)	Cerro	Bella Vista
4	1945	Progreso (1)	Racing	Danubio
5	1946	Cerro (1)	Racing	Sud América
6	1947	Danubio (1)	Bella Vista	Progreso
7	1948	(Championship not completed due to players strike)		
8	1949	Bella Vista (1)	Racing	Sud América
9	1950	Defensor (1)	Sud América	Racing
10	1951	Sud América (1)	Fénix	Bella Vista
11	1952	Montevideo Wanderers (1)	Bella Vista	Progreso
12	1953	Miramar Misiones (2)	Progreso	Sud América
13	1954	Sud América (2)	Central Español	Racing
14	1955	Racing (1)	Fénix	Central Español
15	1956	Fénix (1)	Central Español	River Plate
16	1957	Sud América (3)	Central Español	Canillitas
17	1958	Racing (2)	Progreso	Central Español
18	1959	Fénix (2)	Colón	Central Español
19	1960	Danubio (2)	River Plate	Central Español
20	1961	Central Español (1)	Sud América	Bella Vista
21	1962	Montevideo Wanderers (2)	Sud América	Bella Vista
22	1963	Sud América (4)	Colón	Central Español
23	1964	Colón (1)	Liverpool	La Luz
24	1965	Defensor (2)	La Luz	Progreso
25	1966	Liverpool (1)	River Plate	Central Español
26	1967	River Plate (2)	La Luz	Montevideo Wanderers
27	1968	Bella Vista (2)	Huracán Buceo	Montevideo Wanderers
28	1969	Huracán Buceo	Central Español	Progreso
29	1970	Danubio	Progreso	Central Español
30	1971	Rentistas	Fénix	Miramar Misiones
31	1972	Montevideo Wanderers	Fénix	Racing
32	1973	Fénix (3)	Rampla Juniors	Colón
33	1974	Racing (3)	Colón	Central Español
34	1975	Sud América (5)	El Tanque Sisley	Uruguay Montevideo
35	1976	Bella Vista (3)	Rampla Juniors	Racing
36	1977	Fénix (4)	Rampla Juniors	Racing
37	1978	River Plate (3)	La Luz	Central Español
38	1979	Progreso	Miramar Misiones	La Luz
39	1980	Rampla Juniors	Racing	Liverpool
40	1981	El Tanque Sisley	Racing	La Luz
41	1982	Colón	Fénix	Villa Española
42	1983	Central Español	Racing	Rentistas
43	1984	River Plate (4)	Huracán	Liverpool
44	1985	Fénix (5)	Liverpool	Cerrito
45	1986	Miramar Misiones	Rentistas	Sud América
46	1987	Liverpool	Racing	Sud América
47	1988	Rentistas	Racing	Sud América
48	1989	Racing (4)	Cerrito	Sud América
49	1990	El Tanque Sisley	Sud América	Basáñez
50	1991	River Plate (5)	Huracán	Basáñez
51	1992	Rampla Juniors	Huracán Buceo	Basáñez
52	1993	Basáñez	Central Español	Fénix
53	1994	Sud América (6)	Racing	Uruguay Montevideo
54	1995	Huracán Buceo	Racing	Rentistas
Segunda División Profesional
55	1996	Rentistas	Racing	Progreso
56	1997	Bella Vista (4)	Villa Española	Progreso
57	1998	Cerro	Deportivo Maldonado	Frontera Rivera Chico
58	1999	Juventud	Villa Española	Racing
59	2000	Montevideo Wanderers	Central Español	Fénix
60	2001	Villa Española	Progreso	Plaza Colonia
61	2002	Liverpool	Miramar Misiones	Deportivo Colonia
62	2003	Cerrito	Rentistas	Rocha
63	2004	River Plate (6)	Rampla Juniors	Paysandú
64	2005	Bella Vista (5)	Central Español	Atenas
65	2005–06	Progreso	Juventud	Basáñez
66	2006–07	Fénix (6)	Cerro	Juventud
67	2007–08	Racing (5)	Cerro Largo	Villa Española
68	2008–09	Fénix (7)	Cerrito	Atenas
69	2009–10	El Tanque Sisley	Bella Vista	Miramar Misiones
70	2010–11	Rentistas	Cerrito	Cerro Largo
71	2011–12	Central Español	Juventud	Progreso
72	2012–13	Sud América (7)	Rentistas	Miramar Misiones
73	2013–14	Tacuarembó	Atenas	Rampla Juniors
74	2014–15	Liverpool	Plaza Colonia	Villa Teresa
75	2015–16	Rampla Juniors	Villa Española	Boston River
76	2016	El Tanque Sisley	Atenas	Cerro Largo
77	2017	Torque	Atenas	Progreso
78	2018	Cerro Largo	Juventud	Plaza Colonia
79	2019	Torque	Deportivo Maldonado	Rentistas
80	2020	Cerrito (2)	Villa Española	Sud América
81	2021	Albion (1)	Danubio	Defensor Sporting
82	2022	Racing (6)	La Luz	Cerro
83	2023	Miramar Misiones (4)	Progreso	Rampla Juniors
84	2024	Plaza Colonia (1)	Montevideo City Torque	Juventud
85	2025	Albion (2)	Central Español	Deportivo Maldonado
85	2026	Plaza Colonia (2)	Rentistas	

== Titles by club ==
Club	Winners	Winning years
Fénix	7	1956, 1959, 1973, 1977, 1985, 2006–07, 2008–09
Sud América	7	1951, 1954, 1957, 1963, 1975, 1994, 2012–13
Racing	6	1955, 1958, 1974, 1989, 2007–08, 2022
River Plate	6	1943, 1967, 1978, 1984, 1991, 2004
Bella Vista	5	1949, 1968, 1976, 1997, 2005
Wanderers	4	1952, 1962, 1972, 2000
Rentistas	4	1971, 1988, 1996, 2010–11
Liverpool	4	1966, 1987, 2002, 2015
Miramar Misiones	4	1942, 1953, 1986, 2023
Rampla Juniors	4	1944, 1980, 1992, 2006–07
El Tanque Sisley	4	1981, 1990, 2009–10, 2016
Central Español	3	1961, 1983, 2011–12
Danubio	3	1947, 1960, 1970
Progreso	3	1945, 1979, 2005–06
Albion	2	2021, 2025
Cerro	2	1946, 1998
Cerrito	2	2003, 2020
Colón	2	1964, 1982
Defensor	2	1950, 1965
Huracán Buceo	2	1969, 1995
Plaza Colonia	2	2024, 2026
Torque	2	2017, 2019
Basáñez	1	1993
Cerro Largo	1	2018
Juventud	1	1999
Tacuarembó	1	2013–14
Villa Española	1	2001

== See also ==
- Campeonato Uruguayo de Fútbol
- Uruguayan Primera División
