= Deportivo Maldonado =

Association football club in Uruguay

- Full name: Club Deportivo Maldonado
- Nicknames: El Depor; Verdirrojo; Rojiverde; Batacazo
- Founded: August 25, 1928; 98 years ago
- Ground: Estadio Domingo Burgueño, Maldonado, Uruguay
- Capacity: 22,000
- Chairman: Malcolm Caine
- Manager: Gabriel Di Noia
- League: Liga AUF Uruguaya
- 2025: Segunda División, 5th of 14 (promoted via play-offs)
- Website: deportivomaldonadosad.com
| Home colours | Away colours |

Club Deportivo Maldonado is a football club from Maldonado, Uruguay. They currently play in the Uruguayan Primera División.

== History ==
logo of the parent sports club

Club Deportivo Maldonado was founded on 25 August 1928 in Maldonado, Uruguay, originally under the name Batacazo. The club later adopted the name Club Deportivo Maldonado in 1932 and became associated with its traditional red and green colours."Historia". Deportivo Maldonado S.A.D.

The club has represented the Maldonado Department in Uruguay’s professional football structure and has played its home matches at the Estadio Domingo Burgueño Miguel, one of the principal sporting venues in the department."Estadio Domingo Burgueño Miguel". FIFA. 11 January 2018.

In 2009, Deportivo Maldonado became one of the first Uruguayan clubs to operate through a sports corporation structure, Deportivo Maldonado S.A.D., reflecting a wider trend towards SAD ownership models in Uruguayan football."El auge de las SAD en el fútbol uruguayo". La Mañana. 29 April 2021.

Following the adoption of the Deportivo Maldonado S.A.D. structure, the club experienced one of the most notable sporting periods in its modern history. Deportivo Maldonado achieved promotion to the Uruguayan Primera División for the 2020 season after finishing second in the 2019 Segunda División Profesional."Torque campeón de la temporada 2019 de la Segunda División Profesional". Asociación Uruguaya de Fútbol.

The club subsequently qualified for the 2023 Copa Libertadores, marking its first participation in South America’s leading club competition. Deportivo Maldonado entered the competition in the second qualifying stage, where it drew 0–0 with Brazilian side Fortaleza in the first leg at the Estadio Domingo Burgueño Miguel before being eliminated after the second leg in Brazil."Nueve equipos jugarán por primera vez la CONMEBOL Libertadores". CONMEBOL. 6 February 2023."Semana de definición: ocho equipos buscan el pasaje a la Fase 3 de la CONMEBOL Libertadores". CONMEBOL. 28 February 2023."Ocho equipos clasificados a la Fase 3 de la CONMEBOL Libertadores". CONMEBOL. 3 March 2023.

Following its promotion through the 2025 Segunda División play-offs, Deportivo Maldonado returned to the Uruguayan top flight and is competing in the 2026 Liga AUF Uruguaya, Uruguay’s Primera División."Deportivo Maldonado ascendió a Primera División". El Espectador.

== Current squad ==
As of 22 March, 2026

Note: Flags indicate national team as defined under FIFA eligibility rules; some limited exceptions apply. Players may hold more than one non-FIFA nationality.

| No. | Pos. | Nation | Player |
|---|---|---|---|
| 1 | GK | URU | Adriano Freitas |
| 3 | DF | URU | Hernán Menosse |
| 4 | DF | ARG | Juan Martín Ginzo |
| 5 | MF | URU | Lucas Núñez |
| 7 | MF | URU | Gonzalo Larrazábal |
| 8 | MF | ARG | Maximiliano González (on loan from Lanús) |
| 9 | FW | URU | Elías de León |
| 10 | FW | URU | Maximiliano Noble |
| 11 | FW | URU | Guillermo López |
| 14 | FW | URU | Christian Tabó |
| 15 | MF | URU | Sebastián González |
| 16 | FW | URU | Renato César |
| 17 | MF | URU | Bruno Centeno |
| 19 | DF | URU | Facundo Tealde |

| No. | Pos. | Nation | Player |
|---|---|---|---|
| 20 | MF | URU | Sebastián Tormo |
| 21 | MF | ARG | Matías Espíndola |
| 22 | DF | URU | Juan Ramos |
| 23 | MF | URU | Adrian Vila |
| 25 | GK | URU | Diego Segovia |
| 26 | MF | URU | Thiago Correa |
| 28 | MF | URU | Santiago Cartagena |
| 29 | FW | URU | Emiliano Mozzone |
| 31 | DF | ARG | Franco Marino |
| 32 | DF | URU | Hernán Petryk |
| 33 | DF | URU | Nicolás Fuica |
| 42 | DF | URU | Joaquín Fernández |
| 99 | FW | BRA | Bruno Mendes |

=== Out on loan ===
Note: Flags indicate national team as defined under FIFA eligibility rules; some limited exceptions apply. Players may hold more than one non-FIFA nationality.

| No. / Pos. / Nation / Player; — / DF / URU / Diego Romero (at Liverpool (Montevideo) until 31 December 2026) | No. / Pos. / Nation / Player |
