= 2026 Copa de la Liga AUF =

Tournament details
- Country: Uruguay
- Dates: 11–29 January 2026
- Teams: 16

Final positions
- Champions: Progreso (1st title)
- Runners-up: Boston River

Tournament statistics
- Matches played: 15
- Goals scored: 29 (1.93 per match)

The 2026 Copa de la Liga AUF was the first edition of the Copa de la Liga AUF, a football cup tournament for the 16 clubs participating in the Liga AUF Uruguaya, the top tier of Uruguayan football. Its creation was announced on 24 December 2025, and the tournament was played from 11 to 29 January 2026, prior to the start of the 2026 Liga AUF Uruguaya.

Progreso were the champions, having defeated Boston River 2–1 in the final.

== Format ==
The competition was played under a single-elimination format, with the 16 participating teams being seeded for the first round according to their placement in the aggregate table of the previous Liga AUF Uruguaya season, and the promoted teams (Albion, Central Español, and Deportivo Maldonado) being the three lowest seeds, ordered according to their placement in the 2025 Segunda División. All rounds of the competition (round of 16, quarter-finals, semi-finals, and final) were played over a single match on neutral ground, with the winner being decided in a penalty shootout if matches ended tied after 90 minutes.

If the teams that qualified for the Supercopa Uruguaya also reached the final of this competition, both the Supercopa and the Copa de la Liga AUF would be awarded in the former competition.

The winners of the competition were awarded US$100,000, to be exclusively spent on infrastructure projects.

== Schedule ==
The schedule for the competition was as follows:

Round	Dates
Round of 16	11–14 January 2026
Quarter-finals	17–19 January 2026
Semi-finals	22–23 January 2026
Final	29 January 2026

== Venues ==
The competition was held at neutral venues both in Montevideo and in the interior of Uruguay, selected by the Uruguayan Football Association.

City	Stadium	Capacity
Montevideo	Parque Alfredo Víctor Viera	11,000
Montevideo	Luis Franzini	16,000
Montevideo	Charrúa	14,000
Montevideo	Parque Federico Omar Saroldi	6,000
Montevideo	Parque Palermo	6,500
Montevideo	Centenario	60,235
Colonia del Sacramento	Juan Gaspar Prandi	3,000
Maldonado	Domingo Burgueño Miguel	22,000
Minas	Juan Antonio Lavalleja	8,000

== Bracket ==
Round of 16
Peñarol (p)	0 (5)
Central Español	0 (3)
Racing	2
Cerro	1
Boston River	1
Danubio	0
Liverpool	0
Albion	2
Nacional (p)	0 (4)
Deportivo Maldonado	0 (3)
Montevideo City Torque	2
Cerro Largo	3
Juventud	3
Montevideo Wanderers	0
Defensor Sporting	0 (3)
Progreso (p)	0 (4)

Quarter-finals
Peñarol	1
Racing	0
Boston River (p)	1 (4)
Albion	1 (3)
Nacional (p)	1 (5)
Cerro Largo	1 (4)
Juventud	0
Progreso	1

Semi-finals
Peñarol	2 (2)
Boston River (p)	2 (4)
Nacional	1 (1)
Progreso (p)	1 (3)

Final
Boston River	1
Progreso	2

== Round of 16 ==
11 January 2026	Juventud	3–0	Montevideo Wanderers	Montevideo
19:00 UTC−3	Morosini 15'; Izaguirre 53'; Larregui 65'	Report		Stadium: Parque Federico Omar Saroldi; Referee: Santiago Motta
Note: Match originally scheduled for 10 January 2026, 21:30 local time, but rescheduled due to poor weather.

11 January 2026	Defensor Sporting	0–0 (3–4 p)	Progreso	Colonia del Sacramento
21:30 UTC−3		Report		Stadium: Juan Gaspar Prandi; Referee: Kevin Fontes
	Penalties
	Jorge (penalty scored); Cuello (penalty missed); Bruschi (penalty scored); Sena (penalty scored); Navarro (penalty missed)		(penalty scored) Lemmo; (penalty scored) Fernández; (penalty missed) Kidd; (penalty scored) Copelotti; (penalty scored) Cardozo

12 January 2026	Boston River	1–0	Danubio	Montevideo
19:00 UTC−3	González 55'	Report		Stadium: Parque Alfredo Víctor Viera; Referee: Pablo Silveira

12 January 2026	Peñarol	0–0 (5–3 p)	Central Español	Minas
21:30 UTC−3		Report		Stadium: Juan Antonio Lavalleja; Referee: Andrés Martínez
	Penalties
	González (penalty scored); Madruga (penalty scored); Daguer (penalty scored); Barboza (penalty scored); Alegre (penalty scored)		(penalty scored) Gonella; (penalty missed) Tarragona; (penalty scored) Muniz; (penalty scored) Ponce

13 January 2026	Liverpool	0–2	Albion	Montevideo
19:00 UTC−3		Report	Abreu 25'; Roldán 89'	Stadium: Charrúa; Referee: Juan Cianni

13 January 2026	Nacional	0–0 (4–3 p)	Deportivo Maldonado	Montevideo
21:30 UTC−3		Report		Stadium: Gran Parque Central; Referee: Augusto Olmos
	Penalties
	Calione (penalty scored); Clematte (penalty missed); Martínez (penalty scored); Dos Santos (penalty scored); González (penalty scored)		(penalty scored) Ginzo; (penalty scored) Menosse; (penalty scored) Tabó; (penalty missed) Mozzone; (penalty missed) Vila

14 January 2026	Montevideo City Torque	2–3	Cerro Largo	Montevideo
19:00 UTC−3	Shaw 8'; Rodríguez 45+1'	Report	Pandiani 7', 10'; Hernández 27' (pen.)	Stadium: Charrúa; Referee: Rubén Umpiérrez

14 January 2026	Racing	2–1	Cerro	Montevideo
21:30 UTC−3	Suárez 57'; Gadea 75'	Report	Cambón 90'	Stadium: Parque Alfredo Víctor Viera; Referee: Federico Arman

== Quarter-finals ==
17 January 2026	Nacional	1–1 (5–4 p)	Cerro Largo	Montevideo
20:00 UTC−3	Dos Santos 31'	Report	Monserrat 59'	Stadium: Parque Federico Omar Saroldi; Referee: Felipe Vikonis
	Penalties
	Calione (penalty scored); Dos Santos (penalty scored); Martínez (penalty missed); Montaos (penalty missed); González (penalty scored); Vera (penalty scored); T. Viera (penalty scored)		(penalty scored) Sellecchia; (penalty missed) Pandiani; (penalty scored) Bertocchi; (penalty missed) Assis; (penalty scored) Correa; (penalty scored) G. Viera; (penalty missed) Añasco

18 January 2026	Boston River	1–1 (4–3 p)	Albion	Montevideo
19:00 UTC−3	Bonfiglio 1' (pen.)	Report	Pais 72'	Stadium: Parque Palermo; Referee: Federico Modernell
	Penalties
	González (penalty scored); Amado (penalty scored); O'Neil (penalty scored); Sosa (penalty missed); Romero (penalty scored)		(penalty missed) López; (penalty missed) Puente; (penalty scored) De los Santos; (penalty scored) Roldán; (penalty scored) Perdomo

18 January 2026	Juventud	0–1	Progreso	Montevideo
21:30 UTC−3		Report	Andueza 38'	Stadium: Parque Federico Omar Saroldi; Referee: Pablo Silveira

19 January 2026	Peñarol	1–0	Racing	Montevideo
21:30 UTC−3	Álvarez 19'	Report		Stadium: Parque Alfredo Víctor Viera; Referee: Eduardo Varela

== Semi-finals ==
22 January 2026	Nacional	1–1 (1–3 p)	Progreso	Montevideo
20:30 UTC−3	Verón Lupi 34'	Report	Sánchez 14'	Stadium: Centenario; Referee: Leandro Lasso
	Penalties
	Calione (penalty scored); Dos Santos (penalty missed); González (penalty missed); Vera (penalty missed)		(penalty missed) Lemmo; (penalty scored) Copelotti; (penalty scored) Fernández; (penalty scored) López

23 January 2026	Peñarol	2–2 (2–4 p)	Boston River	Montevideo
20:30 UTC−3	Álvarez 21', 38'	Report	Ramírez 15'; Al. González 45'	Stadium: Parque Alfredo Víctor Viera; Referee: Esteban Guerra
	Penalties
	L. González (penalty missed); Barboza (penalty scored); Fernández (penalty scored); Ag. González (penalty missed)		(penalty scored) Bonfiglio; (penalty scored) Amado; (penalty scored) O'Neil; (penalty scored) Haller

== Final ==
29 January 2026
20:00 UTC−3

Boston River	1–2	Progreso
Pérez 50'	Report	De León 19'; Sánchez 55'

Parque Alfredo Víctor Viera, Montevideo
Referee: Bruno Sacarelo

== See also ==
- 2026 Liga AUF Uruguaya
- 2026 Supercopa Uruguaya
