= 2025 Peñarol season =

Peñarol
2025 season
- Manager: Diego Aguirre
- Stadium: Estadio Campeón del Siglo
- Liga AUF Uruguaya: 6th
- Supercopa Uruguaya: Runners-up
- Copa Libertadores: Round of 16
- Average home league attendance: 19,786
Home colours	Away colours	Third colours

The 2025 season is the 134th in the history of Club Atlético Peñarol and their 121st consecutive season in Uruguay's top flight. In addition to competing in the Primera División and Copa Uruguay, the club will take part in the Copa Libertadores.

== Transfers ==
=== In ===
Pos.	Player	Transferred from	Fee	Date	Source
MF	(Uruguay) Leonardo Fernández	(Mexico) Toluca	Free	5 January 2025	
DF	(Uruguay) Gastón Silva	(Mexico) Puebla	Free	17 January 2025	
FW	(Uruguay) Alexander Machado	(Uruguay) Boston River	€190,000	24 January 2025	
FW	(Paraguay) Héctor Villalba	(Paraguay) Libertad	Free	30 January 2025	
MF	(Argentina) Eric Remedi	(Argentina) San Lorenzo	Free	7 February 2025	
MF	(Uruguay) Alejo Cruz	(Brazil) Atlético Goianiense	Free	30 July 2025	
GK	(Chile) Brayan Cortés	(Chile) Colo-Colo	Loan	1 August 2025	

=== Out ===
Pos.	Player	Transferred to	Fee	Date	Source
MF	(Uruguay) Franco González	(Colombia) La Equidad	Loan	26 June 2025	
MF	(Uruguay) Brian Mansilla	(Portugal) Arouca	€800,000	1 July 2025	
MF	(Uruguay) Rodrigo Pérez	(Paraguay) Olimpia	Contract terminated	21 July 2025	
DF	(Uruguay) Gastón Silva	(Argentina) Godoy Cruz	Free	23 July 2025	
DF	(Brazil) Léo Coelho	(Brazil) Amazonas	Released	13 August 2025	

== Friendlies ==
=== Pre-season ===
12 January 2025 Friendly	Peñarol (Uruguay)	1–1	(Chile) Colo-Colo

16 January 2025 Friendly	Peñarol (Uruguay)	0–1	(Argentina) San Lorenzo

20 January 2025 Friendly	Nacional (Uruguay)	3–1	(Uruguay) Peñarol

== Competitions ==
=== Overall record ===
Competition	First match	Last match	Starting round	Final position	Record							
Competition	First match	Last match	Starting round	Final position	Pld	W	D	L	GF	GA	GD	Win %
Liga AUF Uruguaya	2 February 2025		Matchday 1	2nd	41	25	8	8	70	38	+32	60.98
Supercopa Uruguaya	26 January 2025		Final	Runners-up	1	0	0	1	1	2	−1	0.00
Copa Libertadores	2 April 2025	19 August 2025	Group stage	Round of 16	8	4	2	2	11	7	+4	50.00
Total					50	29	10	11	82	47	+35	58.00

Last updated: 19 August 2025
Source: Competitions

=== Liga AUF Uruguaya ===
==== Apertura ====
2 February 2025 1	Progreso	1–3	Peñarol

9 February 2025 2	Nacional	1–1	Peñarol

15 February 2025 3	Peñarol	1–1	Boston River

24 February 2025 4	River Plate	1–1	Peñarol

9 March 2025 5	Peñarol	0–2	Racing

15 March 2025 6	Plaza Colonia	1–0	Peñarol

21 March 2025 7	Peñarol	0–3	Liverpool

27 March 2025 8	Juventud	0–2	Peñarol

30 March 2025 9	Peñarol	0–2	Cerro Largo	Montevideo
				Stadium: Estadio Campeón del Siglo

5 April 2025 10	Danubio	0–1	Peñarol	Montevideo
16:00 UTC−3			Villalba 27'	Stadium: Estadio Jardines del Hipódromo

12 April 2025 11	Peñarol	4–2	Miramar Misiones	Montevideo
18:30 UTC−3				Stadium: Estadio Campeón del Siglo

19 April 2025 12	Wanderers	1–2	Peñarol	Montevideo
18:30 UTC−3	Veglio 19'		Silvera 31'; Báez (red card) 51'; Villalba 85'	Stadium: Estadio Alfredo Victor Viera

27 April 2025 13	Peñarol	3–1; Abandoned	Cerro	Montevideo
18:15 UTC−3				Stadium: Estadio Campeón del Siglo

2 May 2025 14	Defensor Sporting	0–1	Peñarol	Montevideo
21:30				Stadium: Estadio Luis Franzini

18 May 2025 15	Peñarol	2–1	Montevideo City Torque

=== Supercopa Uruguaya ===
26 January 2025 Final	Nacional	2–1	Peñarol	Montevideo
20:30 UTC−3				Stadium: Estadio Centenario; Referee: José Burgos

=== Copa Libertadores ===
==== Group stage ====
Pos	Team	Pld	W	D	L	GF	GA	GD	Pts	Qualification
1	(Argentina) Vélez Sarsfield	6	3	2	1	11	4	+7	11	Advance to round of 16
2	(Uruguay) Peñarol	6	3	2	1	9	4	+5	11	Advance to round of 16
3	(Bolivia) San Antonio Bulo Bulo	6	2	0	4	5	15	−10	6	Transfer to Copa Sudamericana
4	(Paraguay) Olimpia	6	1	2	3	9	11	−2	5	

Source: CONMEBOL
Rules for classification: 1) Points; 2) Goal difference; 3) Goals scored; 4) Away goals scored; 5) CONMEBOL ranking.

2 April 2025 1	Vélez Sársfield (Argentina)	2–1	(Uruguay) Peñarol	Buenos Aires, Argentina
19:00 UTC−3	Carrizo 80'; Montoro 90+5'		Fernández 48'	Stadium: José Amalfitani Stadium; Attendance: 20,108; Referee: Raphael Claus (Brazil)

8 April 2025 2	Peñarol (Uruguay)	2–0	(Bolivia) San Antonio Bulo Bulo	Montevideo
21:00 UTC−3	Villalba 60'; Machado 90+4'			Stadium: Estadio Campeón del Siglo; Attendance: 0 (Note: Peñarol played their home matches in the group stage behind closed doors as they were punished for incidents in their 2024 Copa Libertadores home matches against Flamengo and Botafogo.); Referee: Paulo Cesar Zanovelli (Brazil)

23 April 2025 3	Olimpia (Paraguay)	0–0	(Uruguay) Peñarol	Asunción
19:00 UTC−3			Fernández (penalty missed) 52'	Stadium: Estadio Defensores del Chaco; Attendance: 19,869; Referee: Jesús Valenzuela (Venezuela)

6 May 2025 4	San Antonio Bulo Bulo (Bolivia)	0–3	(Uruguay) Peñarol	Cochabamba, Bolivia
22:00 UTC−4				Stadium: Estadio Félix Capriles; Attendance: 2,725; Referee: Cristián Garay (Chile)

15 May 2025 5	Peñarol (Uruguay)	3–2	(Paraguay) Olimpia	Montevideo
19:00 UTC−3	Fernández 50'; Silvera 55'; Remedi 72'	Report	L. López 13'; Leguizamón 37'	Stadium: Estadio Campeón del Siglo; Attendance: 0 Referee: Wilmar Roldán (Colombia)

29 May 2025 6	Peñarol (Uruguay)	0–0	(Argentina) Vélez Sarsfield	Montevideo
19:00 UTC−3		Report		Stadium: Estadio Campeón del Siglo; Attendance: 0 Referee: Anderson Daronco (Brazil)

==== Final stages ====
The draw for the round of 16 was held on 2 June 2025, 12:00 PYT (UTC−3) at the CONMEBOL headquarters in Luque, Paraguay.

===== Round of 16 =====
12 August 2025 First leg	Peñarol (Uruguay)	1–0	(Argentina) Racing	Montevideo
21:30 UTC−3	Terans 78'	Report		Stadium: Estadio Campeón del Siglo; Attendance: 35,570; Referee: Raphael Claus (Brazil)

19 August 2025 Second leg	Racing (Argentina)	3–1 (3–2 agg.)	(Uruguay) Peñarol	Avellaneda
21:30 UTC−3	Martínez 7', 83' (pen.); Pardo 90+4'	Report	Herrera 15'	Stadium: El Cilindro; Referee: Wilmar Roldán (Colombia)
