= 2024 Peñarol season =

Peñarol
2024 season
- Penarol starting XI before their 4-0 win versus The Strongest in the Copa Libertadores Round of 16
- Manager: Diego Aguirre
- Stadium: Estadio Campeón del Siglo
- Liga AUF Uruguaya: Apertura: 1st
- Liga AUF Uruguaya: Clausura: 1st
- Intermedio: Runners-up
- 2023 Copa Uruguay: Semi-finals
- 2024 Copa Uruguay: Round of 32
- Copa Libertadores: Semi-finals
- Top goalscorer: League: Leonardo Fernández (16); All: Leonardo Fernández (19)
- Biggest win: Cerro 0–5 Peñarol; Peñarol 5–0 Caracas
- Biggest defeat: Botafogo 5–0 Peñarol

The 2024 season was the 133rd in the history of Club Atlético Peñarol and the club’s 120th consecutive season in the Uruguayan Primera División. In addition to its league campaign, Peñarol also competed in the Copa Uruguay and the Copa Libertadores.

== Friendlies ==
14 January 2024 Serie Río de la Plata 2024	Peñarol (Uruguay)	0–1	(Argentina) Newell's Old Boys
			May 7'

17 January 2024 Serie Río de la Plata 2024	Nacional (Uruguay)	1–1 (4–1 p)	(Uruguay) Peñarol
	Romero 30'		Silvera 55'; Hernández (red card) 81'

20 January 2024 Serie Río de la Plata 2024	Peñarol (Uruguay)	1–0	(Argentina) Belgrano
	Silvera 29'

23 January 2024 Serie Río de la Plata 2024	Peñarol (Uruguay)	0–2	(Uruguay) Nacional
			Bentancourt 15'; Carneiro 31'; Pereyra (red card) 79'

9 July 2024 Friendly	Peñarol (Uruguay)	0–2	(Argentina) San Lorenzo
			Leguizamón 24'; Reali 66'

== Competitions ==
=== Overall record ===
Competition	First match	Last match	Starting round	Final position	Record							
Competition	First match	Last match	Starting round	Final position	Pld	W	D	L	GF	GA	GD	Win %
Liga AUF Uruguaya Apertura	18 February 2024	2 June 2024	Matchday 1	Winners	15	13	2	0	31	7	+24	86.67
Liga AUF Uruguaya Intermedio	8 June 2024	4 August 2024	Group stage	Runners-up	8	4	3	1	11	6	+5	50.00
Liga AUF Uruguaya Clasura	17 August 2024	1 December 2024	Matchday 1	Winners	15	12	2	1	32	5	+27	80.00
2023 Copa Uruguay	5 February 2024	17 April 2024	Round of 16	Semi-finals	3	2	0	1	6	4	+2	66.67
2024 Copa Uruguay	11 September 2024		Round of 32	Round of 32	1	0	0	1	0	3	−3	0.00
Copa Libertadores	5 April 2024	30 October 2024	Group stage	Semi-finals	11	6	1	4	20	12	+8	54.55
Total					53	37	8	8	100	37	+63	69.81

Source: Competitions

=== Liga AUF Uruguaya ===
==== Results summary ====
Overall								Home						Away					
Pld	W	D	L	GF	GA	GD	Pts	W	D	L	GF	GA	GD	W	D	L	GF	GA	GD
15	13	2	0	31	7	+24	41	6	1	0	14	1	+13	7	1	0	17	6	+11

===== Results by round =====
Round	1	2	3	4	5	6	7	8	9	10	11	12	13	14	15
Ground	A	H	A	H	A	H	A	H	A	H	A	H	A	H	A
Result	W	W	W	W	W	D	W	W	W	W	D	W	W	W	W
Position															

A = Away; H = Home; W = Win; D = Draw; L = Loss

===== Matches =====
18 February 2024 1	Cerro Largo	1–2	Peñarol

24 February 2024 2	Peñarol	2–0	Miramar Misiones

3 March 2024 3	Rampla Juniors	0–3	Peñarol

9 March 2024 4	Peñarol	3–0	Cerro

16 March 2024 5	Racing	1–2	Peñarol

29 March 2024 6	Peñarol	0–0	Nacional

7 April 2024 7	Deportivo Maldonado	1–2	Peñarol

14 April 2024 8	Peñarol	2–0	Danubio

20 April 2024 9	Boston River	1–3	Peñarol

29 April 2024 10	Peñarol	3–0	River Plate

3 May 2024 11	Liverpool	2–2	Peñarol

11 May 2024 12	Peñarol	1–0	Wanderers

18 May 2024 12	Defensor Sporting	0–2	Peñarol

23 May 2024 14	Peñarol	3–1	Progreso

2 June 2024 15	Fénix	0–1	Peñarol

==== Intermedio ====
Group 1

===== Results by round =====
Round	1	2	3	4	5	6	7
Ground	A	H	A	H	A	H	H
Result	L	D	W	D	W	W	W
Position							

A = Away; H = Home; W = Win; D = Draw; L = Loss

8 June 2024 1	Wanderers	2–0	Peñarol

16 June 2024 2	Peñarol	1–1	Racing

22 June 2024 3	Progreso	0–2	Peñarol

6 July 2024 4	Peñarol	1–1	Deportivo Maldonado

14 July 2024 5	River Plate	1–3	Peñarol

21 July 2024 6	Peñarol	2–0	Fénix

27 July 2024 7	Peñarol	1–0	Defensor Sporting

===== Final =====
4 August 2024	Nacional	1–1 (8–7 p)	Peñarol	Montevideo
15:00 UTC−3	Izquierdo (yellow card) 31'; González (yellow card) 54'; Mejía (yellow card) 65'; Petit 79'; Antoni (red card) 88'; Oliva (red card) 88'		Fernández 33', (yellow card) 51'; Hernández (yellow card) 37'; Rodríguez (yellow card) 64'; Silvera (yellow card) 75'; Batista (red card) 88'; Cristoforo (red card) 88'	Stadium: Estadio Centenario; Referee: Esteban Ostojich

==== Results summary ====
Overall								Home						Away					
Pld	W	D	L	GF	GA	GD	Pts	W	D	L	GF	GA	GD	W	D	L	GF	GA	GD
15	12	2	1	32	5	+27	38	6	2	0	15	1	+14	6	0	1	17	4	+13

===== Results by round =====
Round	1	2	3	4	5	6	7	8	9	10	11	12	13	14	15
Ground	H	A	H	A	H	A	H	A	H	A	H	A	H	A	H
Result	D	W	W	W	D	L	W	W	W	W	W	W	W	W	W
Position															

A = Away; H = Home; W = Win; D = Draw; L = Loss

===== Matches =====
17 August 2024 1	Peñarol	0–0	Cerro Largo

7 September 2024 2	Miramar Misiones	1–2	Peñarol

14 September 2024 3	Peñarol	4–0	Rampla Juniors

22 September 2024 4	Cerro	0–5	Peñarol

30 September 2024 5	Peñarol	0–0	Racing

6 October 2024 6	Nacional	2–1	Peñarol

11 October 2024 7	Peñarol	2–0	Deportivo Maldonado

16 October 2024 8	Danubio	0–1	Peñarol

19 October 2024 9	Peñarol	2–0	Boston River

3 November 2024 10	River Plate	0–1	Peñarol

9 November 2024 11	Peñarol	2–0	Liverpool

14 November 2024 12	Wanderers	0–2	Peñarol

17 November 2024 13	Peñarol	2–0	Defensor Sporting

26 November 2024 14	Progreso	1–5	Peñarol

1 December 2024 15	Peñarol	3–1	Fénix

=== 2023 Copa Uruguay ===
5 February 2024 Round of 16	Peñarol	2–0	Boston River	Montevideo
20:30 UTC−3				Stadium: Estadio Campeón del Siglo

12 February 2024 Quarter-finals	Peñarol	3–1	Liverpool
20:30 UTC−3

17 April 2024 Semi-finals	Peñarol	1–3	Montevideo City Torque
20:30 UTC−3

=== 2024 Copa Uruguay ===
11 September 2024 Round of 32	Piriápolis	3–0; Awarded	Peñarol	Montevideo
		Report		Stadium: Estadio Domingo Burgueño
Note: Peñarol was deemed to have forfeited the match as a result of not showing up.

=== Copa Libertadores ===
==== Group stage ====
Pos	Team	Pld	W	D	L	GF	GA	GD	Pts	Qualification
1	(Brazil) Atlético Mineiro	6	5	0	1	14	6	+8	15	Advance to round of 16
2	(Uruguay) Peñarol	6	4	0	2	12	5	+7	12	Advance to round of 16
3	(Argentina) Rosario Central	6	2	1	3	8	7	+1	7	Transfer to Copa Sudamericana
4	(Venezuela) Caracas	6	0	1	5	3	19	−16	1	

Source: CONMEBOL
Rules for classification: 1) Points; 2) Goal difference; 3) Goals scored; 4) Away goals scored; 5) CONMEBOL ranking.

4 April 2024 1	Rosario Central (Argentina)	1–0	(Uruguay) Peñarol	Rosario, Argentina
	Quintana 45+1'			Stadium: Estadio Gigante de Arroyito; Attendance: 27,769; Referee: Wilmar Roldán (Colombia)

10 April 2024 2	Peñarol (Uruguay)	5–0	(Venezuela) Caracas	Montevideo
				Stadium: Estadio Campeón del Siglo; Attendance: 23,944; Referee: Felipe González Orellana (Chile)

23 April 2024 3	Atlético Mineiro (Brazil)	3–2	(Uruguay) Peñarol	Belo Horizonte, Brazil
				Stadium: Arena MRV; Attendance: 34,279; Referee: Andrés Rojas (Colombia)

7 May 2024 4	Caracas (Venezuela)	0–1	(Uruguay) Peñarol	Caracas, Venezuela
				Stadium: Estadio Olímpico de la UCV; Attendance: 4,252; Referee: Mario Díaz de Vivar (Paraguay)

14 May 2024 5	Peñarol (Uruguay)	2–0	(Brazil) Atlético Mineiro	Montevideo
				Stadium: Estadio Campeón del Siglo; Attendance: 29,086; Referee: Wilmar Roldán (Colombia)

28 May 2024 6	Peñarol (Uruguay)	2–1	(Argentina) Rosario Central	Montevideo
				Stadium: Estadio Campeón del Siglo; Attendance: 29,681; Referee: Piero Maza (Chile)

==== Round of 16 ====
14 August 2024 First leg	Peñarol (Uruguay)	4–0	(Bolivia) The Strongest	Montevideo
				Stadium: Estadio Campeón del Siglo; Attendance: 32,235; Referee: Raphael Claus (Brazil)

21 August 2024 Second leg	The Strongest (Bolivia)	1–0 (1–4 agg.)	(Uruguay) Peñarol	La Paz, Bolivia
				Stadium: Estadio Hernando Siles; Referee: Cristián Garay (Chile)

==== Quarter-finals ====
19 September 2024 First leg	Flamengo (Brazil)	0–1	(Uruguay) Peñarol	Rio de Janeiro, Brazil
			Cabrera 13'	Stadium: Maracanã Stadium; Attendance: 64,396; Referee: Jesús Valenzuela (Venezuela)

26 September 2024 Second leg	Peñarol (Uruguay)	0–0 (1–0 agg.)	(Brazil) Flamengo	Montevideo
			Plata (yellow card) 20'; Ortiz (yellow card) 63'	Stadium: Estadio Campeón del Siglo; Attendance: 38,144; Referee: Facundo Tello (Argentina)

==== Quarter-finals ====
23 October 2024 First leg	Botafogo (Brazil)	5–0	(Uruguay) Peñarol	Rio de Janeiro, Brazil
21:45 UTC−3	Luiz Henrique (yellow card) 13', (goal) 73'; Igor Jesus (yellow card) 36', (goal) 79'; Savarino 51', 59'; Barboza 55'; Gregore (yellow card) 61'		Pérez (yellow card) 36'	Stadium: Estádio Nilton Santos; Attendance: 42,982; Referee: Andrés Rojas (Colombia)

30 October 2024 Second leg	Peñarol (Uruguay)	3–1 (3–6 agg.)	(Brazil) Botafogo	Montevideo
21:30 UTC−3	Báez 31', 66'; Aguerre (red card) 45+5'; Ignacio Sosa (yellow card) 86'; Batista 89'		Bastos (yellow card) 28'; Matheus Martins (yellow card) 45+4'; Vitinho (yellow card) 49'; Ponte (yellow card) 69' (yellow-red card) 69'; Almada (yellow card) 71', (goal) 88'	Stadium: Estadio Centenario; Attendance: 33,034; Referee: Piero Maza (Chile)
Note: The match was moved to Estadio Centenario due to clashes that occurred ahead of the first leg.
