= Arady =

Arady is a Hungarian surname. Notable people with the surname include:

- Kálmán Arady (1893–1964), Hungarian physician and art historian
- Bruno Arady (born 2007), Uruguayan footballer
