= Mauro Silveira =

Uruguayan footballer (born 2000)

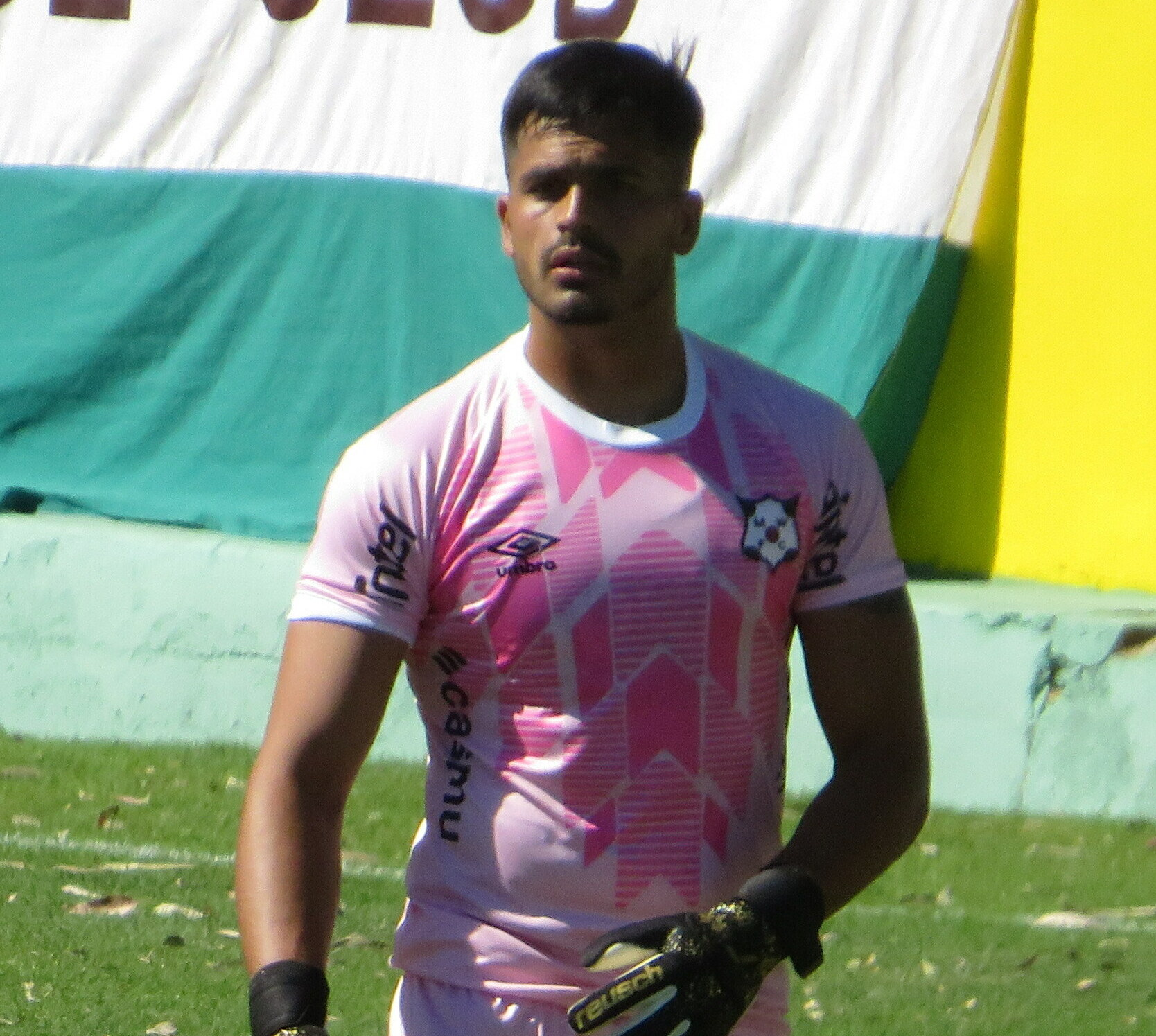
- Silveira with Montevideo Wanderers in 2023

Personal information
- Full name: Mauro Santiago Silveira Lacuesta
- Date of birth: 6 May 2000 (age 26)
- Place of birth: Montevideo, Uruguay
- Height: 1.85 m (6 ft 1 in)
- Position: Goalkeeper

Team information
- Current team: Atlético Junior
- Number: 1

Youth career
- Montevideo Wanderers

Senior career*
Years	Team	Apps	(Gls)
2018–2025	Montevideo Wanderers	107	(0)
2025–	Atlético Junior	3	(0)

International career^{‡}
2015	Uruguay U15	11	(0)
2016–2017	Uruguay U17	18	(0)
2017	Uruguay U18	2	(0)
2018–2019	Uruguay U20	12	(0)
2019	Uruguay U22	1	(0)
2024–	Uruguay local	1	(0)
- * Club domestic league appearances and goals as of 03 August 2025 ‡ National team caps and goals as of 5 December 2024

Mauro Santiago Silveira Lacuesta (born 6 May 2000) is a Uruguayan professional footballer who plays as a goalkeeper for Categoría Primera A club Atlético Junior.

== Club career ==
Silveira is a youth academy graduate of Montevideo Wanderers. He made his professional debut for the club on 6 May 2018 in a 2–0 league defeat to Liverpool Montevideo.

In June 2025, Silveira joined Colombian club Atlético Junior on a three-year contract.

== International career ==
Silveira has represented Uruguay at the 2015 South American U-15 Championship, 2017 South American U-17 Championship, 2019 South American U-20 Championship, 2019 FIFA U-20 World Cup and the 2019 Pan American Games.

In May 2024, Silveira was named in the first ever squad of the Uruguay A' national team.

== Career statistics ==
As of 24 October 2022

Appearances and goals by club, season and competition
Club	Season	League			Cup		Continental		Other		Total	
Club	Season	Division	Apps	Goals	Apps	Goals	Apps	Goals	Apps	Goals	Apps	Goals
Montevideo Wanderers	2018	Uruguayan Primera División	4	0	—		0	0	—		4	0
Montevideo Wanderers	2019	Uruguayan Primera División	0	0	—		0	0	—		0	0
Montevideo Wanderers	2020	Uruguayan Primera División	3	0	—		—		0	0	3	0
Montevideo Wanderers	2021	Uruguayan Primera División	7	0	—		2 (Note: Appearances in Copa Libertadores.)	0	0	0	9	0
Montevideo Wanderers	2022	Uruguayan Primera División	22	0	0	0	4 (Note: Appearances in Copa Sudamericana.)	0	—		26	0
Career total			36	0	0	0	6	0	0	0	42	0
