= Nahuel Herrera =

Uruguayan footballer (born 2004)

Personal information
- Full name: Nahuel Herrera Viera
- Date of birth: 1 December 2004 (age 21)
- Place of birth: Rosario, Uruguay
- Height: 1.86 m (6 ft 1 in)
- Position: Centre-back

Team information
- Current team: Peñarol
- Number: 34

Youth career
- Peñarol

Senior career*
| Years | Team | Apps | (Gls) |
| 2023– | Peñarol | 48 | (2) |

International career
| 2018–2019 | Uruguay U15 | 10 | (1) |
- * Club domestic league appearances and goals as of 19 November 2026

Nahuel Herrera Viera (born 1 December 2004) is a Uruguayan professional footballer who plays as a centre-back for Liga AUF Uruguaya club Peñarol.

== Club career ==
Herrera is a youth academy graduate of Peñarol. He made his professional debut for the club on 5 March 2023 in a 2–1 league win against Deportivo Maldonado. He scored his first goal on 27 March 2025 in a 2–0 win against Juventud.

== International career ==
Herrera has represented Uruguay at the under-15 level. He made his debut for the team on 18 September 2018 in a friendly match against Argentine club Newell's Old Boys, scoring a goal in a 4–4 draw. However, he was not included in Uruguay's squad for the 2019 South American U-15 Championship.

== Personal life ==
Herrera cites Walter Olivera and Virgil van Dijk as his football role models.

== Career statistics ==
As of match played 19 November 2026

Appearances and goals by club, season and competition
| Club | Season | League | | | Cup | | Continental | | Other | | Total | |
| Club | Season | Division | Apps | Goals | Apps | Goals | Apps | Goals | Apps | Goals | Apps | Goals |
|---|---|---|---|---|---|---|---|---|---|---|---|---|
| Peñarol | 2023 | Liga AUF Uruguaya | 5 | 0 | 1 | 0 | 1 (Note: Appearance in Copa Sudamericana) | 0 | 0 | 0 | 7 | 0 |
| Peñarol | 2024 | Liga AUF Uruguaya | 5 | 0 | 0 | 0 | 0 | 0 | 0 | 0 | 5 | 0 |
| Peñarol | 2025 | Liga AUF Uruguaya | 26 | 1 | 2 | 0 | 8 (Note: Appearances in Copa Libertadores) | 1 | 4 (Note: Three appearances in championship playoffs, one appearance in Torneo Intermedio final) | 0 | 40 | 2 |
| Peñarol | 2026 | Liga AUF Uruguaya | 12 | 1 | 1 | 0 | 0 | 0 | 2 (Note: One appearance in Supercopa Uruguaya, one appearance in Torneo Intermedio final) | 0 | 15 | 1 |
| Career total | | | 48 | 2 | 4 | 0 | 9 | 1 | 6 | 0 | 67 | 3 |

== Honours ==
Peñarol

- Uruguayan Primera División: 2024
- Copa Uruguay: 2025
- Supercopa Uruguaya: 2026

Individual

- Liga AUF Uruguaya young player of the year: 2025
- Liga AUF Uruguaya team of the year: 2025
