= Uruguay local national football team =

Local national association football team of Uruguay

Uruguay local
- Association: Asociación Uruguaya de Fútbol (AUF)
- Confederation: CONMEBOL (South America)
- Head coach: Diego Pérez
- Captain: Franco Catarozzi
- Most caps: Santiago Cartagena; Franco Pizzichillo (3)
- Top scorer: Bruno Damiani (2)
- Home stadium: Estadio Centenario
- FIFA code: URU
| First colours | Second colours |

First international
- Costa Rica 0–0 Uruguay (San José, Costa Rica; 31 May 2024)

Biggest win
- Uruguay 2–1 (Brazil) Grêmio (Rivera, Uruguay; 5 December 2024)

Biggest defeat
- N/A

The Uruguay local national football team is the local national football team of Uruguay and is open only to domestic league players. It is administered by the Uruguayan Football Association, the governing body for football in Uruguay.

== History ==
In April 2024, Jorge Giordano, director of national teams, announced the creation of Uruguay local national football team. On 4 May 2024, it was confirmed that the newly formed national team would play their first match on 31 May against Costa Rica. On 15 May, Uruguayan Football Association announced that there will be no permanent coaching staff for the team. Diego Pérez was confirmed as the manager for match against Costa Rica on the same day.

Uruguay local national played their first match on 31 May 2024 against Costa Rica, which ended in a goalless draw. On 1 September 2024, Lucas Pino scored the team's first ever goal in a 1–1 draw against Guatemala.

== Results and fixtures ==
The following is a list of match results in the last 12 months, as well as any future matches that have been scheduled.

Win Draw Loss Fixture

== Coaching staff ==
=== Current personnel ===
As of 3 December 2024

| Position | Name |
|---|---|
| Head coach | (Uruguay) Diego Pérez |
| Assistant coach | (Uruguay) Álvaro Fernández |
| Goalkeeping coach | (Uruguay) Santiago Morandi |

== Players ==
=== Current squad ===
The following 23 players were called up to the squad for a friendly match against Grêmio on 5 December 2024.

Caps and goals correct as of 5 December 2024, after the match against Grêmio.

| No. | Pos. | Player | Date of birth (age) | Caps | Goals | Club |
|---|---|---|---|---|---|---|
| 1 | GK | Mauro Silveira | 6 May 2000 (age 26) | 1 | 0 | (Colombian Football Federation) Atlético Junior |
| 12 | GK | Santiago Silva | 11 May 1999 (age 27) | 1 | 0 | (Football Federation of Chile) Universidad de Concepción |
| 23 | GK | Francisco Tinaglini | 9 November 1998 (age 27) | 0 | 0 | (Hellenic Football Federation) Panserraikos |
| 2 | DF | Leonard Costa | 24 August 1998 (age 28) | 1 | 0 | (Argentine Football Association) Independiente Rivadavia |
| 3 | DF | Lucas Monzón | 29 September 2001 (age 25) | 2 | 0 | (Colombian Football Federation) Atlético Junior |
| 4 | DF | Emiliano Ancheta | 9 June 1999 (age 27) | 1 | 0 | (Uruguayan Football Association) Nacional |
| 5 | DF | Franco Pizzichillo | 3 January 1996 (age 30) | 3 | 0 | (Uruguayan Football Association) Montevideo City Torque |
| 6 | DF | Mateo Acosta | 4 March 2003 (age 23) | 1 | 0 | (Uruguayan Football Association) Montevideo Wanderers |
| 13 | DF | Ramiro Brazionis | 15 December 2001 (age 24) | 1 | 0 | (Uruguayan Football Association) Racing Montevideo |
| 14 | DF | Facundo Kidd | 4 August 1997 (age 29) | 1 | 0 | (Uruguayan Football Association) Progreso |
| 15 | DF | Lucas Morales | 25 November 1999 (age 26) | 2 | 0 | (Paraguayan Football Association) Olimpia |
| 8 | MF | Santiago Cartagena | 1 September 2002 (age 24) | 3 | 0 | (Uruguayan Football Association) Deportivo Maldonado |
| 10 | MF | Agustín Amado | 6 February 2001 (age 25) | 2 | 0 | (Uruguayan Football Association) Boston River |
| 16 | MF | Erik De Los Santos | 16 January 1999 (age 27) | 1 | 0 | (Uruguayan Football Association) Racing Montevideo |
| 18 | MF | Franco Catarozzi (captain) | 2 April 2000 (age 26) | 2 | 0 | (Brazilian Football Confederation) Remo |
| 21 | MF | Diego Romero | 2 March 2000 (age 26) | 2 | 0 | (Uruguayan Football Association) Liverpool Montevideo |
| 7 | FW | Gonzalo Larrazábal | 4 November 2002 (age 23) | 2 | 0 | (Uruguayan Football Association) Deportivo Maldonado |
| 9 | FW | Bruno Damiani | 18 April 2002 (age 24) | 2 | 2 | (United States Soccer Federation) Philadelphia Union |
| 11 | FW | Leandro Suhr | 24 September 1997 (age 29) | 2 | 0 | (Uruguayan Football Association) Boston River |
| 17 | FW | Luciano Cosentino | 18 May 2001 (age 25) | 2 | 0 | (Uruguayan Football Association) Montevideo Wanderers |
| 19 | FW | Nicolás Fernández | 6 February 2003 (age 23) | 2 | 0 | (Iraq Football Association) Al-Zawraa |
| 20 | FW | Juan Cruz de los Santos | 22 February 2003 (age 23) | 1 | 0 | (Uruguayan Football Association) Nacional |
| 22 | FW | Alexander Machado | 28 May 2002 (age 24) | 2 | 0 | (Argentine Football Association) Banfield |

=== Recent call-ups ===
The following players have also been called up to the squad in the past twelve months.

| Pos. | Player | Date of birth (age) | Caps | Goals | Club | Latest call-up |
|---|---|---|---|---|---|---|
Notes: ^{INJ} = Withdrew due to injury; ^{PRE} = Preliminary squad; ^{WD} = Player withdrew from the squad due to non-injury issue.

== Individual records ==
As of 5 December 2024, after the match against Grêmio.

=== Most appearances ===
| Rank | Player | Caps | Goals | Career |
|---|---|---|---|---|
| 1 | Santiago Cartagena | 3 | 0 | 2024–present |
| 1 | Franco Pizzichillo | 3 | 0 | 2024–present |
| 3 | Bruno Damiani | 2 | 2 | 2024–present |
| 3 | Agustín Amado | 2 | 0 | 2024–present |
| 3 | Franco Catarozzi | 2 | 0 | 2024–present |
| 3 | Luciano Cosentino | 2 | 0 | 2024–present |
| 3 | Nicolás Fernández | 2 | 0 | 2024–present |
| 3 | Matias Fonseca | 2 | 0 | 2024–present |
| 3 | Gonzalo Larrazábal | 2 | 0 | 2024–present |
| 3 | Alexander Machado | 2 | 0 | 2024–present |
| 3 | Lucas Monzón | 2 | 0 | 2024–present |
| 3 | Lucas Morales | 2 | 0 | 2024–present |
| 3 | Diego Romero | 2 | 0 | 2024–present |
| 3 | Leandro Suhr | 2 | 0 | 2024–present |

=== Top goalscorers ===
| Rank | Player | Goals | Caps | Ratio | Career |
|---|---|---|---|---|---|
| 1 | Bruno Damiani | 2 | 2 | 1 | 2024–present |
| 2 | Lucas Pino | 1 | 1 | 1 | 2024–present |

== Head-to-head record ==
The following table shows Uruguay local national team's all-time record, correct as of 5 December 2024 after the match against Grêmio.

Positive record
Neutral record
Negative record

| Opponents | Pld | W | D | L | GF | GA | GD | Win % |
|---|---|---|---|---|---|---|---|---|
| Costa Rica | 1 | 0 | 1 | 0 | 0 | 0 | 0 | 0% |
| (Brazil) Grêmio | 1 | 1 | 0 | 0 | 2 | 1 | +1 | 100% |
| Guatemala | 1 | 0 | 1 | 0 | 1 | 1 | 0 | 0% |
| Total (3) | 3 | 1 | 2 | 0 | 3 | 2 | +1 | 33% |

== See also ==
- Uruguay national football team
- Uruguay national under-23 football team
- Uruguay national under-20 football team
- Uruguay national under-18 football team
- Uruguay national under-17 football team
- Uruguay national under-15 football team
