= Juan Pedro Damiani =

Uruguayan lawyer and FIFA official

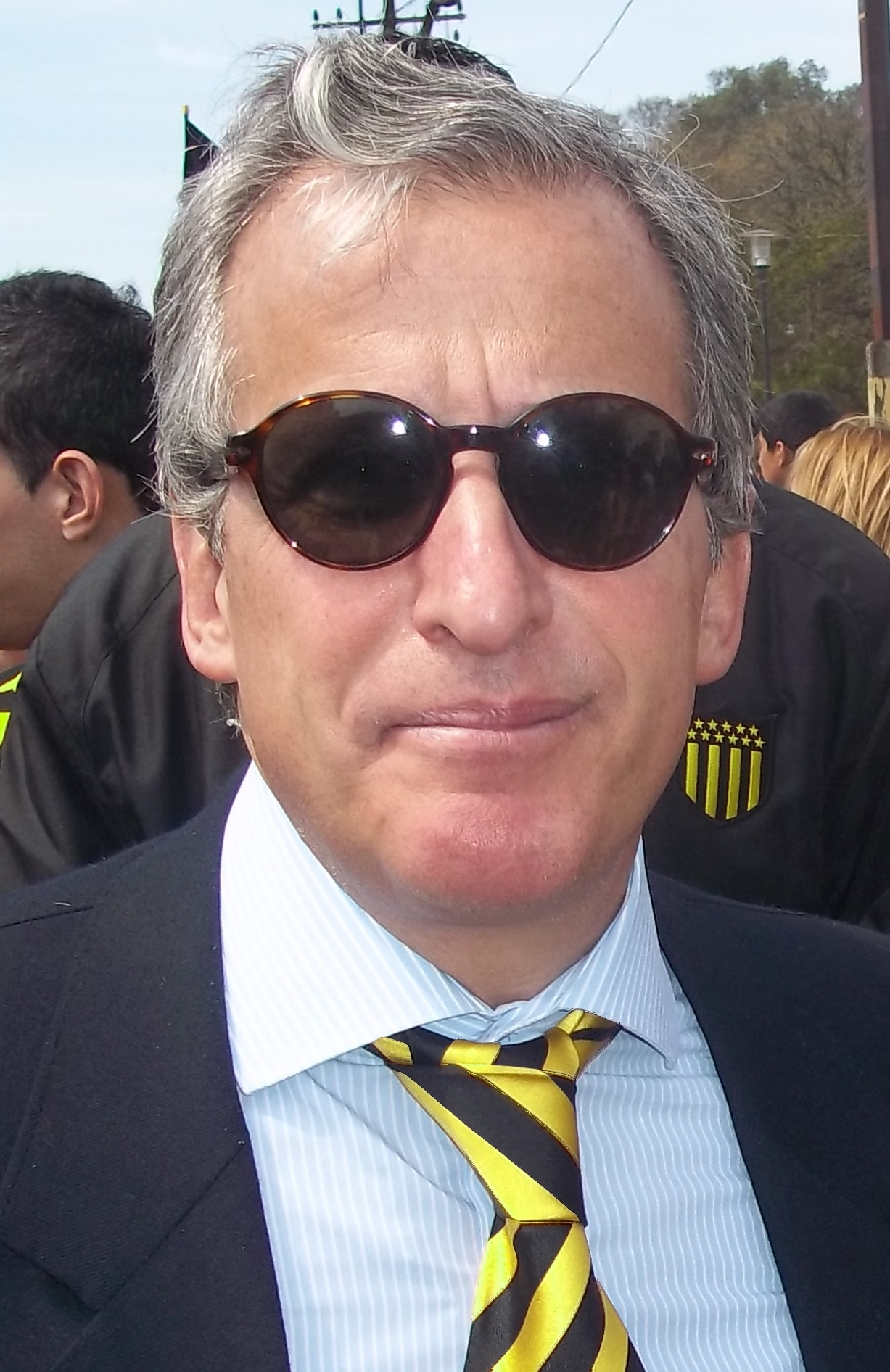
- Occupation: Lawyer
- Known for: Former member of the FIFA Ethics Committee

Juan Pedro Damiani (born June 14, 1958) is a Uruguayan lawyer, and a former member of the FIFA Ethics Committee.

Damiani resigned from the FIFA Ethics Committee on 6 April 2016, following allegation in the Panama Papers, connecting him to fellow Uruguayan Eugenio Figueredo, the former FIFA vice-president arrested in 2015 by the United States Department of Justice on corruption charges.

== National career ==
Damiani was president of the Uruguayan Peñarol Montevideo football club for eight years from 2008 until 2016. He was credited with opening Peñarol Montevideo's new stadium, the Campeón del Siglo, in 2016. Three years after his FIFA scandal, Juan Pedro Damiani had officially announced that he would run again for Peñarol's presidency in the elections in December 2020.

== International career ==
Damiani was a member of FIFA's Ethics Committee from 2006 until his resignation on 6 April 2016. After Gianni Infantino took over the FIFA presidency in 2016, an investigation revealed the corrupt relationship between Damiani and Eugenio Figueredo, the former FIFA vice-president. Figueredo was charged by U.S. authorities with fraud and money laundering for his role in the alleged bribery conspiracy. It turns out Damiani and his company provided legal assistance to at least seven offshore companies linked to Figueredo. The revelation of the relationship was the result of more than 11 million documents, the so-called Panama Papers leaked through the German newspaper Suddeutsche Zeitung from a Panama-based law firm specialising in helping wealthy and influential offshore firms.
