= Axel Pérez =

Uruguayan football player (born 2002)

Personal information
- Full name: Axel Alejandro Pérez Etchelar
- Date of birth: 18 February 2002 (age 24)
- Place of birth: Montevideo, Uruguay
- Height: 1.78 m (5 ft 10 in)
- Position: Forward

Team information
- Current team: Fénix
- Number: 18

Youth career
- Nacional

Senior career*
Years	Team	Apps	(Gls)
2021–2023	Nacional	1	(0)
2021	→ Montevideo City Torque (loan)	13	(1)
2023–	Racing Montevideo	20	(0)
2024–	→ Fénix (loan)	6	(0)

International career
2018–2019	Uruguay U17	20	(5)
- * Club domestic league appearances and goals as of 27 November 2024

Axel Alejandro Pérez Etchelar (born 18 February 2002) is a Uruguayan professional footballer who plays as a forward for Fénix on loan from Racing Montevideo.

== Club career ==
A youth academy graduate of Nacional, Pérez made his professional debut on 29 March 2021 in a 2–1 league win against Deportivo Maldonado. In April 2021, Pérez and his Nacional teammate Santiago Cartagena joined Montevideo City Torque on a loan deal until 31 December 2022.

In January 2023, Pérez joined Racing Montevideo after terminating his contract with Nacional.

== International career ==
Pérez is a former Uruguayan youth international. He was included in the national team for 2019 South American U-17 Championship.

== Career statistics ==
As of 18 October 2022

Appearances and goals by club, season and competition
Club	Season	League			Cup		Continental		Other		Total	
Club	Season	Division	Apps	Goals	Apps	Goals	Apps	Goals	Apps	Goals	Apps	Goals
Nacional	2020	Uruguayan Primera División	1	0	—		0	0	0	0	1	0
Nacional	2021	Uruguayan Primera División	0	0	—		0	0	0	0	0	0
Nacional	2022	Uruguayan Primera División	0	0	0	0	0	0	0	0	0	0
Nacional	Total		1	0	0	0	0	0	0	0	1	0
Montevideo City Torque (loan)	2021	Uruguayan Primera División	13	1	—		0	0	—		13	1
Career total			14	1	0	0	0	0	0	0	14	1

== Honours ==
Nacional

- Uruguayan Primera División: 2020
