= Copa de la Liga AUF =

- Organiser(s): AUF
- Founded: 24 December 2025; 9 months ago
- Region: Uruguay
- Teams: 16
- Related competitions: Liga AUF Uruguaya
- Current champions: Progreso (1st title)
- Most championships: Progreso (1 title)
- Broadcaster: DSports
- Website: AUF
- 2026 Copa de la Liga AUF

The Copa de la Liga (officially Copa de la Liga AUF) is a knockout football competition in Uruguayan men's domestic football, involving the teams participating in the top-tier league Liga AUF Uruguaya. Its first edition was played in 2026.

== History ==
Its creation was announced on 24 December 2025, and the first edition of the tournament was played from 11 to 25 January 2026, prior to the start of the 2026 Liga AUF Uruguaya. Progreso were the first team to win the competition, defeating Boston River 2–1 in the final of the 2026 edition.

== Format ==
For its first edition in 2026, the competition was played under a single-elimination format, with the 16 participating teams being seeded for the first round according to their placement in the aggregate table of the previous Liga AUF Uruguaya season, and the promoted teams (Albion, Central Español, and Deportivo Maldonado) being the three lowest seeds, ordered according to their placement in the 2025 Segunda División. All rounds of the competition (round of 16, quarter-finals, semi-finals, and final) are played over a single match on neutral ground, with the winner being decided in a penalty shootout if matches end tied after 90 minutes.

If the teams that qualified for the Supercopa Uruguaya also reach the final of this competition, both the Supercopa and the Copa de la Liga AUF will be awarded in the former competition.

The winner of the competition is also awarded US$100,000, to be exclusively spent on infrastructure projects.

== Results ==
- (In bracket, title count):

Ed.	Year	Champion	Score	Runner-up	Venue
1	2026	Progreso (1)	2–1	Boston River	Parque Alfredo Victor Viera, Montevideo
