= Santiago Cartagena =

Uruguayan footballer (born 2002)

Personal information
- Full name: Santiago Cartagena Listur
- Date of birth: 1 September 2002 (age 24)
- Place of birth: Montevideo, Uruguay
- Height: 1.74 m (5 ft 9 in)
- Position: Midfielder

Team information
- Current team: Deportivo Maldonado
- Number: 28

Youth career
- Nacional

Senior career*
| Years | Team | Apps | (Gls) |
| 2020–2023 | Nacional | 9 | (1) |
| 2021–2022 | → Montevideo City Torque (loan) | 35 | (0) |
| 2023– | Deportivo Maldonado | 51 | (1) |

International career^{‡}
| 2018–2019 | Uruguay U17 | 15 | (1) |
| 2024– | Uruguay local | 3 | (0) |
- * Club domestic league appearances and goals as of 19 May 2025 ‡ National team caps and goals as of 5 December 2024

Santiago Cartagena Listur (born 1 September 2002) is a Uruguayan professional footballer who plays as a midfielder for Deportivo Maldonado.

== Club career ==
A youth academy graduate of Nacional, Cartagena made his professional debut on 7 September 2020 in a 5–1 league win against Cerro. He came on as an 80th-minute substitute for Gabriel Neves and scored his team's final goal in injury time. In April 2021, Cartagena and his Nacional teammate Axel Pérez joined Montevideo City Torque on a loan deal until 31 December 2022.

== International career ==
Cartagena is a former Uruguay youth international. He was part of Uruguay under-17 team which participated at the 2019 South American U-17 Championship.

In May 2024, Cartagena was named in the first ever Uruguay local national team squad. He made his Uruguay local team debut on 31 May 2024 in a goalless draw against Costa Rica.

== Career statistics ==
As of 3 February 2023

Appearances and goals by club, season and competition
| Club | Season | League | | | Cup | | Continental | | Other | | Total | |
| Club | Season | Division | Apps | Goals | Apps | Goals | Apps | Goals | Apps | Goals | Apps | Goals |
|---|---|---|---|---|---|---|---|---|---|---|---|---|
| Nacional | 2020 | Uruguayan Primera División | 4 | 1 | — | | 5 (Note: Appearance(s) in Copa Libertadores) | 0 | 1 (Note: Appearance in championship playoffs) | 0 | 10 | 1 |
| Nacional | 2023 | Uruguayan Primera División | 0 | 0 | 0 | 0 | 0 | 0 | 0 | 0 | 0 | 0 |
| Nacional | Total | | 4 | 1 | 0 | 0 | 5 | 0 | 1 | 0 | 10 | 0 |
| Montevideo City Torque (loan) | 2021 | Uruguayan Primera División | 16 | 0 | — | | 0 | 0 | — | | 16 | 0 |
| Montevideo City Torque (loan) | 2022 | Uruguayan Primera División | 19 | 0 | 2 | 0 | 1 | 0 | — | | 22 | 0 |
| Montevideo City Torque (loan) | Total | | 35 | 0 | 2 | 0 | 1 | 0 | 0 | 0 | 38 | 0 |
| Career total | | | 39 | 1 | 2 | 0 | 6 | 0 | 1 | 0 | 48 | 1 |

== Honours ==
Nacional

- Uruguayan Primera División: 2020
