= Lucas Pino =

Uruguayan footballer (born 2005)

Personal information
- Full name: Lucas Pino García
- Date of birth: 30 October 2005 (age 21)
- Place of birth: San José de Mayo, Uruguay
- Height: 1.81 m (5 ft 11 in)
- Position: Attacking midfielder

Team information
- Current team: Montevideo City Torque
- Number: 10

Youth career
- Nueva Unión
- Oriental de Rodríguez
- Montevideo City Torque

Senior career*
Years	Team	Apps	(Gls)
2022–	Montevideo City Torque	20	(2)

International career
2024–2025	Uruguay U20	14	(1)
2024–	Uruguay local	1	(1)
- * Club domestic league appearances and goals as of 30 March 2025

Lucas Pino García (born 30 October 2005) is a Uruguayan professional footballer who plays as an attacking midfielder for Uruguayan Primera División club Montevideo City Torque.

== Club career ==
Pino played baby fútbol for Nueva Unión and Oriental de Rodríguez before joining Montevideo City Torque. He made his professional debut for Torque on 21 October 2022 in a 1–2 league defeat to River Plate Montevideo. In September 2024, he extended his contract with Torque until December 2029.

== International career ==
Pino was part of the Uruguay under-20 team which won the 2024 COTIF.

In August 2024, Pino was called up by Uruguay local team head coach Diego Pérez for a friendly match against Guatemala. On 1 September 2024, he made his Uruguay local team debut by scoring a goal in a 1–1 draw against Guatemala. This made him the first ever goal scorer in the history of the Uruguay local team.

On 9 September 2024, Pino received his first call-up to the Uruguay national team for a FIFA World Cup qualification match against Venezuela. In January 2025, he was named in Uruguay's 23-man squad for the 2025 South American U-20 Championship.

== Career statistics ==
As of match played 16 November 2024

Appearances and goals by club, season and competition
Club	Season	League			Cup		Continental		Other		Total	
Club	Season	Division	Apps	Goals	Apps	Goals	Apps	Goals	Apps	Goals	Apps	Goals
Montevideo City Torque	2022	UPD	1	0	0	0	0	0	—		1	0
Montevideo City Torque	2023	UPD	0	0	1	0	—		—		1	0
Montevideo City Torque	2024	USD	15	2	1	2	—		0	0	16	4
Montevideo City Torque	2025	UPD	0	0	0	0	—		—		0	0
Career total			16	2	2	2	0	0	0	0	18	4
