= Leandro Suhr =

Uruguayan football player (born 1997)

Personal information
- Full name: Leandro Suhr Avondet
- Date of birth: 24 September 1997 (age 29)
- Place of birth: Tarariras, Uruguay
- Height: 1.75 m (5 ft 9 in)
- Position: Forward

Team information
- Current team: Boston River
- Number: 16

Youth career
- 2010–2016: Atlético Maracaná Tarariras
- 2016: Plaza Colonia

Senior career*
Years	Team	Apps	(Gls)
2016–2023	Plaza Colonia	154	(15)
2023–	Boston River	73	(6)
2025	→ Sarmiento (loan)	23	(1)

International career^{‡}
2019	Uruguay U22	3	(0)
2024–	Uruguay local	2	(0)
- * Club domestic league appearances and goals as of 2 August 2026 ‡ National team caps and goals as of 5 December 2024

Leandro Suhr Avondet (born 24 September 1997) is a Uruguayan professional footballer who plays as a forward for Liga AUF Uruguaya club Boston River.

== International career ==
Suhr is a former Uruguayan youth international. He was part of Uruguay's squad at the 2019 Pan American Games.

In May 2024, Suhr was named in the first ever Uruguay local national team squad. He made his Uruguay local team debut on 31 May 2024 in a goalless draw against Costa Rica.

== Career statistics ==
As of 23 October 2022

Appearances and goals by club, season and competition
Club	Season	League			Cup		Continental		Other		Total	
Club	Season	Division	Apps	Goals	Apps	Goals	Apps	Goals	Apps	Goals	Apps	Goals
Plaza Colonia	2016	Uruguayan Primera División	2	0	—		0	0	—		2	0
Plaza Colonia	2017	Uruguayan Primera División	11	0	—		—		—		11	0
Plaza Colonia	2018	Uruguayan Segunda División	22	5	—		—		—		22	5
Plaza Colonia	2019	Uruguayan Primera División	31	3	—		—		—		31	3
Plaza Colonia	2020	Uruguayan Primera División	33	4	—		4 (Note: Appearances in Copa Sudamericana.)	0	—		37	4
Plaza Colonia	2021	Uruguayan Primera División	23	3	—		—		1 (Note: Appearance in championship play-offs.)	0	24	3
Plaza Colonia	2022	Uruguayan Primera División	32	0	3	0	2 (Note: Appearances in Copa Libertadores.)	0	1 (Note: Appearance in Supercopa Uruguaya.)	0	38	0
Career total			154	15	3	0	6	0	2	0	165	15
