= Cerrillos, Uruguay =

Cerrillos Los Cerrillos
- City & Municipality
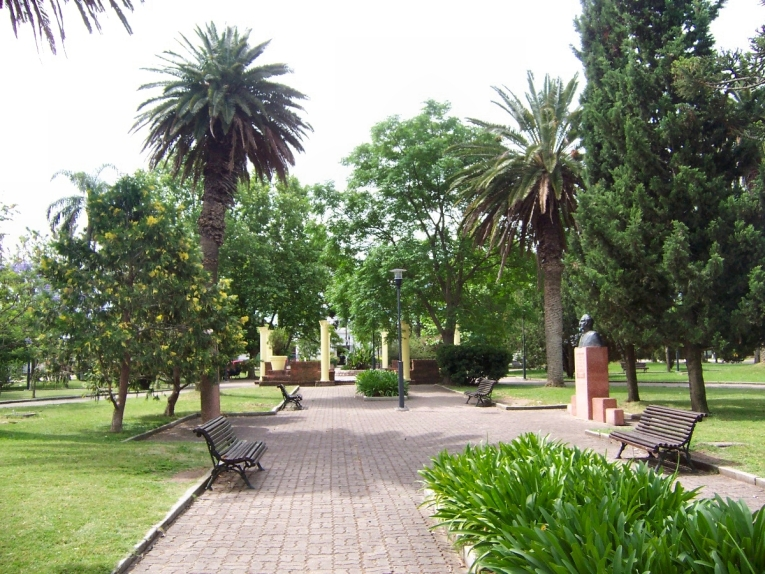
- Central square of Cerrillos

- Location in Uruguay
- Coordinates: 34°36′25″S 56°21′30″W
- Country: Uruguay
- Department: Canelones
- Founded: 1896

Population (2011 Census)
  - Total: 2,508
- Time zone: UTC -3
- Postal code: 90001
- Dial plan: +598 433 (+5 digits)
- Website: http://www.loscerrillos.com.uy/

Cerrillos or Los Cerrillos is a very small city in the west part of the Canelones Department of southern Uruguay.

Cerrillos is also the name of the municipality to which the city belongs. It was created on 15 March 2010 by the Act of Ley Nº 18.653. It comprises the electoral districts CCA and CEB of Canelones department. The localities Campo Militar, Sofía Santos, Las Brujas and Parador Tajes are parts of this municipality.

== Geography ==
=== Location ===
The city is located on the intersection of Route 36 with Route 46, about 16 kilometres (9.9 mi) southwest of the city of Canelones and 40 kilometres (25 mi) north west of the centre of Montevideo.

== History ==
It was founded on 3 August 1896. On 5 July 1907, its status was elevated to "Pueblo" (village) by the Act of Ley N° 3.188, and on 23 October 1958 to "Villa" by the Act of Ley N° 12.581. Finally, on 20 July 1971, it received the status of "Ciudad" (city) by decree N° Ley 13.990.

== Population ==
In 2011 Cerrillos had a population of 2,508. In 2010, the Intendencia de Canelones estimated a population of 7,369 for the municipality during the elections.

Location map of the Municipality of Cerrillos

Year	Population
1908	5,010
1963	1,185
1975	1,601
1985	1,763
1996	1,916
2004	2,080
2011	2,508

Source: Instituto Nacional de Estadística de Uruguay

== Places of worship ==
- Church of St. Michael Archangel (Roman Catholic)

== Notable people ==
- Abel Soria (1937-2016), author and payador
- Wilmar Cabrera (1959 - ), football player and trainer
- Martín Bentancor (1979 - ), author
- Ignacio Molina (2007 - ), football player
