= Ignacio Molina (footballer, born 2007) =

Uruguayan footballer (born 2007)

Personal information
- Full name: Ignacio Molina Cabrera
- Date of birth: 6 December 2007 (age 18)
- Place of birth: Los Cerrillos, Uruguay
- Position: Forward

Team information
- Current team: Montevideo City Torque
- Number: 16

Youth career
- Montevideo City Torque

International career^{‡}
Years	Team	Apps	(Gls)
2025–	Uruguay U18	5	(0)
- ‡ National team caps and goals as of 21 October 2025

Ignacio Molina Cabrera, also known as Nacho Molina (born 6 December 2007 in Los Cerrillos) is a Uruguayan footballer who plays as a forward for Montevideo City Torque.

== Career ==
Molina played for Montevideo City Torque in the U-16 category; scoring 28 goals in the 2023 season, he got a special award from the Uruguayan Football Association.

Currently he is training with the first team. He is also part of the current squad of the Uruguay national under-18 football team. In June 2025 he took part in the U-18 Friendly Games, playing against Portugal, Japan and Australia.
