= Estadio Contador Damiani =

Stadium in Montevideo, Uruguay

- Las Acacias
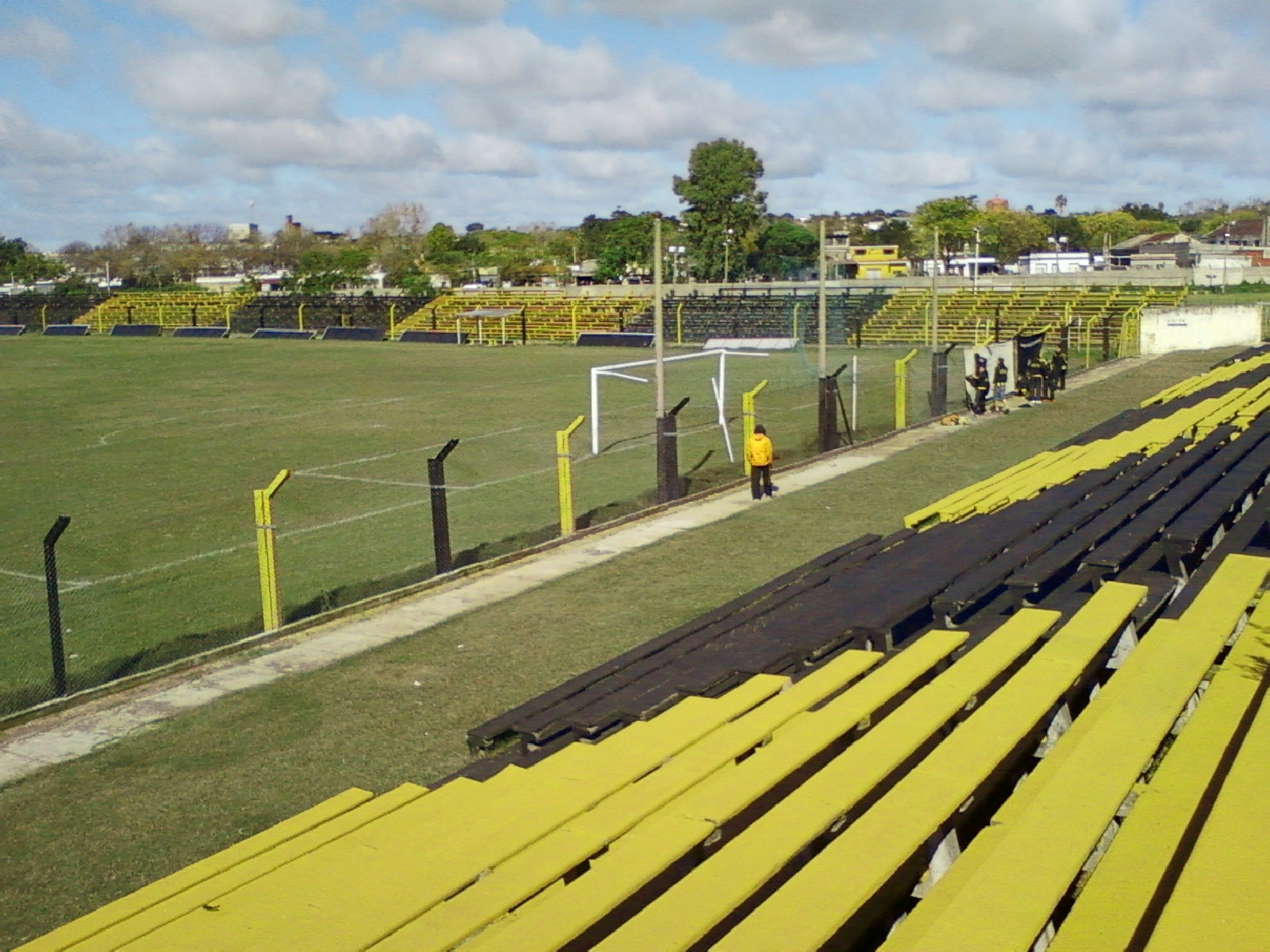
- The stadium in 2013
- Interactive map of Estadio Contador Damiani
- Full name: Estadio José Pedro Damiani
- Former names: Las Acacias
- Coordinates: 34.8417°S 56.1614°W
- Owner: C.A. Peñarol
- Capacity: 7,000
- Surface: Grass

Construction
- Opened: April 19, 1916
- Renovated: 1997

Tenants
- Peñarol (1916–21); Peñarol reserves (1921–present)

Website
- penarol.org/lasacacias

Estadio Contador Damiani, formerly Las Acacias, is a stadium in Montevideo, Uruguay, inaugurated in 1916 and re-built in 1997. It is used mostly for Peñarol's reserves matches. The stadium, mostly used for football matches, can hold up to 7,000 people. VIP stands and the entrance were taken in 1930 to the stadium Estadio Pocitos, where the first ever goal in World Cup history was scored by the French forward Lucien Laurent. The structure has since been returned to its original location.

This stadium bears the name of the person who was president of Peñarol for years, the accountant José Pedro Damiani.

== History ==
In 1912 the company "La Transatlántica" offered the CURCC (club predecessor to Peñarol) a land so that it could build a playing field closer to Montevideo than Villa Peñarol. The 38,000 square feet land was located in the Marconi neighborhood facing Avenida de Las Acacias (today José Possolo) and the authorities of the institution promised to pay for it, monthly installments of 150 pesos of the time until reaching the agreed price (URU$20,207).

In 1913 the payment for the field was completed and it passed definitively into the hands of Peñarol.

After years in which the construction of the stands did not materialize, works were finished under Francisco Simón's administration. The venue was finally inaugurated on April 19, 1916 in a friendly match (won by the local team 3–1) between Peñarol and its classic rival Nacional for the "Transatlantic Cup".

Peñarol played all their home matches at Las Acacias until 1921 when Estadio Pocitos was inaugurated. The great amount of supporters that attended Peñarol matches forced the moving to that venue. Since then, Las Acacias has been used as a venue for Peñarol reserve teams and training divisions, although the senior squad would return to the stadium in the 1990s.

Nevertheless in late 1990s the Municipality of Montevideo disallowed the use of the stadium for Primera División matches alleging security reasons. The last official match played by Peñarol's senior team was on the 1st round of Torneo Clausura in 1997, against Rampla Juniors. For this reason, Peñarol used Estadio Centenario to play their home games until the inauguration of Estadio Campeón del Siglo in 2016.

Although Peñarol has other larger complexes, reforms have been announced to improve the general condition of both the complex and the stadium. In January 2023, it was announced that artificial turf would be installed on the stadium.
