= Franco Pizzichillo =

Uruguayan footballer (born 1996)

Personal information
- Full name: Franco Nicolás Pizzichillo Fernández
- Date of birth: 3 January 1996 (age 30)
- Place of birth: Paysandú, Uruguay
- Height: 1.77 m (5 ft 10 in)
- Positions: Right-back; midfielder

Team information
- Current team: Montevideo City Torque
- Number: 5

Youth career
- Defensor Sporting

Senior career*
Years	Team	Apps	(Gls)
2017–2018	Defensor Sporting	0	(0)
2017	→ Villa Teresa (loan)	17	(6)
2018	→ Cerrito (loan)	12	(5)
2018–	Montevideo City Torque	187	(15)
2022	→ Santos Laguna (loan)	7	(0)

International career^{‡}
2012–2013	Uruguay U17	38	(5)
2014–2015	Uruguay U20	21	(0)
2024–	Uruguay local	3	(0)
Medal record
Representing Uruguay
Men's football
South American U-20 Championship
Third place	2015 Uruguay
- * Club domestic league appearances and goals as of 14 September 2026 ‡ National team caps and goals as of 5 December 2024

Franco Nicolás Pizzichillo Fernández (born 3 January 1996) is a Uruguayan professional footballer who plays as a right-back or midfielder for Liga AUF Uruguaya club Montevideo City Torque.

== Club career ==
Pizzichillo is a youth academy product of Defensor Sporting. He joined Villa Teresa on loan during 2017 Segunda División season and made his senior debut on 2 September 2017 in a 5–1 win against Central Español. He scored his first goal on 10 September 2017 in a 3–2 loss against Tacuarembó.

== International career ==
As a youth international, Pizzichillo was part of Uruguay's squads at the 2013 South American U-17 Championship, 2013 FIFA U-17 World Cup and the 2015 South American U-20 Championship.

On 5 March 2021, Pizzichillo was named in Uruguay senior team's 35-man preliminary squad for the 2022 FIFA World Cup qualifying matches against Argentina and Bolivia. However, CONMEBOL suspended those matches next day amid concern over the COVID-19 pandemic.

In May 2024, Pizzichillo was named in the first ever Uruguay local national team squad. He made his Uruguay local team debut on 31 May 2024 in a goalless draw against Costa Rica.

== Honours ==
Individual

- Uruguayan Primera División Team of the Year: 2020
