= Nahuel Roldán =

Uruguayan footballer (born 1998)

Personal information
- Full name: Ricardo Nahuel Roldán Pinela
- Date of birth: 21 December 1998 (age 27)
- Place of birth: Montevideo, Uruguay
- Height: 1.75 m (5 ft 9 in)
- Position: Winger

Youth career
- Cerro

Senior career*
Years	Team	Apps	(Gls)
2016–2020	Cerro	39	(3)
2017	→ Progreso (loan)	29	(5)
2018	→ Villa Teresa (loan)	11	(0)
2020–2022	Progreso	72	(8)
2023	Uruguay Montevideo	32	(4)
2024–2025	Oriental	23	(5)
2025	Nueva Chicago	6	(0)
- * Club domestic league appearances and goals as of 14 September 2024

Ricardo Nahuel Roldán Pinela (born 21 December 1998) is a Uruguayan professional footballer who plays as a winger for .

== Career ==
Roldán is a youth academy product of Cerro. He made his professional debut on 20 March 2016, coming on as a 90th minute substitute for Hugo Silveira in a 1–0 win against Nacional. He joined Progreso on loan for 2017 Segunda División season. He scored his first goal on 24 June 2017 in a 3–1 win against Deportivo Maldonado.

Roldán joined Progreso through a permanent transfer prior to 2020 Uruguayan Primera División season.

== Career statistics ==
=== Club ===
As of 8 March 2020

Club	Season	League			Cup		Continental		Total	
Club	Season	Division	Apps	Goals	Apps	Goals	Apps	Goals	Apps	Goals
Cerro	2015–16	Uruguayan Primera División	2	0	—		—		2	0
Cerro	2016	Uruguayan Primera División	5	0	—		—		5	0
Cerro	2019	Uruguayan Primera División	32	3	—		4 (Note: Appearances in Copa Sudamericana.)	0	36	3
Cerro	Total		39	3	0	0	4	0	43	3
Progreso (loan)	2017	Uruguayan Segunda División	29	5	—		—		29	5
Progreso (loan)	Total		29	5	0	0	0	0	29	5
Villa Teresa (loan)	2018	Uruguayan Segunda División	11	0	—		—		11	0
Villa Teresa (loan)	Total		11	0	0	0	0	0	11	0
Progreso	2020	Uruguayan Primera División	3	2	—		0	0	3	2
Progreso	Total		3	2	0	0	0	0	3	2
Career total			82	10	0	0	4	0	86	10
