= Erik De Los Santos =

Uruguayan footballer

Personal information
- Full name: Gonzalo Erik De Los Santos Olivera
- Date of birth: 16 January 1999 (age 27)
- Place of birth: Montevideo, Uruguay
- Height: 1.70 m (5 ft 7 in)
- Position: Midfielder

Team information
- Current team: Racing Montevideo

Youth career
- Peñarol

Senior career*
Years	Team	Apps	(Gls)
2019–2021	Peñarol	0	(0)
2020	→ Villa Española (loan)	21	(1)
2021–	Racing Montevideo	94	(7)
2025	→ Unión La Calera (loan)	27	(1)

International career^{‡}
2017	Uruguay U18	4	(0)
2018–2019	Uruguay U20	15	(1)
- * Club domestic league appearances and goals as of 25 January 2026 ‡ National team caps and goals as of 16 January 2025

Gonzalo Erik De Los Santos (born 16 January 1999), known as Erik De Los Santos, is a Uruguayan footballer who plays as a midfielder for Racing Club de Montevideo.

== Club career ==
A product of Peñarol, De Los Santos was loaned out to Villa Española in 2020. The next year, he signed with Racing Club de Montevideo, with whom he won the Uruguayan Segunda División in 2022 and got the promotion to the top level and took part in the 2024 Copa Sudamericana.

In 2025, De Los Santos moved to Chile and signed with Unión La Calera.

== International career ==
De Los Santos represented Uruguay at under-18 level in four friendly matches.

At under-20 level, De Los Santos played 15 matches in total and scored one goal. He made appearances at friendly matches, the 2018 South American Games and the 2019 South American Championship.

De Los Santos made his debut for the Uruguay local national team in a friendly against the Brazilian club Grêmio on 5 December 2024.
