= Nicolás Fernández (footballer, born 2003) =

Uruguayan footballer (born 2003)

Personal information
- Full name: Pablo Nicolás Fernández Sosa
- Date of birth: 6 February 2003 (age 23)
- Place of birth: Paysandú, Uruguay
- Height: 1.69 m (5 ft 7 in)
- Position: Midfielder

Team information
- Current team: Progreso
- Number: 29

Youth career
- Juventud
- Rentistas

Senior career*
Years	Team	Apps	(Gls)
2021–2023	Rentistas	65	(3)
2024–	Progreso	45	(4)

International career^{‡}
2021	Uruguay U20	3	(0)
2024–	Uruguay local	2	(0)
- * Club domestic league appearances and goals as of 24 May 2025 ‡ National team caps and goals as of 5 December 2024

Pablo Nicolás Fernández Sosa (born 6 February 2003) is a Uruguayan professional footballer who plays as a midfielder for Progreso.

== Club career ==
Fernández is a youth academy graduate of Rentistas. He made his professional debut for the club on 1 March 2021 in a 5–0 league defeat against Plaza Colonia.

== International career ==
Fernández is a former Uruguay youth international. In October 2021, he was called up to the Uruguay under-20 team for friendlies against Costa Rica and Honduras.

On 1 September 2024, Fernández made his debut for the Uruguay local national team in a 1–1 draw against Guatemala.

== Career statistics ==
=== Club ===
As of 30 April 2024

Season	Club	League			Cup		Continental		Total	
Season	Club	Division	Apps	Goals	Apps	Goals	Apps	Goals	Apps	Goals
2020	Rentistas	Uruguayan Primera División	1	0	—		—		1	0
2021	Rentistas	Uruguayan Primera División	1	0	—		1 (Note: Appearance in Copa Libertadores.)	0	2	0
2022	Rentistas	Uruguayan Primera División	32	1	0	0	—		32	1
2023	Rentistas	Uruguayan Segunda División	31	2	0	0	—		31	2
2024	Progreso	Uruguayan Primera División	3	0	0	0	—		3	0
Career total			68	3	0	0	1	0	69	3
