= Alexander Machado =

Uruguayan footballer (born 2002)

Personal information
- Full name: Alexander Nicolás Machado Aycaguer
- Date of birth: 28 May 2002 (age 24)
- Place of birth: Montevideo, Uruguay
- Height: 1.79 m (5 ft 10 in)
- Position: Forward

Team information
- Current team: Banfield (on loan from Peñarol)
- Number: 22

Youth career
- Cerro

Senior career*
Years	Team	Apps	(Gls)
2019–2021	Cerro	30	(1)
2021–2025	Boston River	53	(7)
2023–2024	→ Miramar Misiones (loan)	38	(12)
2025–	Peñarol	14	(1)
2025–2026	→ Defensor Sporting (loan)	29	(5)
2026–	→ Banfield (loan)	9	(2)

International career^{‡}
2018–2019	Uruguay U17	13	(2)
2024–	Uruguay local	2	(0)
- * Club domestic league appearances and goals as of 17:54, 8 November 2026 (UTC) ‡ National team caps and goals as of 5 December 2024

Alexander Nicolás Machado Aycaguer (born 28 May 2002) is a Uruguayan professional footballer who plays as a forward for AFA Liga Profesional de Fútbol club Banfield, on loan from Uruguayan Primera División club Peñarol.

== Club career ==
A youth academy graduate of Cerro, Machado made his professional debut for the club on 5 May 2019 in a 2–0 league defeat against Defensor Sporting. Prior to the 2021 season, he joined Boston River.

In January 2025, Machado joined Peñarol on a three-year contract. On 31 July 2025, he joined Defensor Sporting on a one-year loan deal.

== International career ==
Machado is a former Uruguay youth international. He was part of under-17 team at the 2019 South American U-17 Championship. He played four matches in the tournament and scored a goal.

In August 2024, Machado was named in Uruguay local team squad for a friendly match against Guatemala. On 1 September 2024, he made his Uruguay local team debut in a 1–1 draw against Guatemala.
