= Julio Daguer =

Uruguayan association footballer (born 2008)

Personal information
- Full name: Julio Nehúen Daguer González
- Date of birth: 22 February 2008 (age 18)
- Place of birth: Ciudad de la Costa, Uruguay
- Height: 1.76 m (5 ft 9 in)
- Position: Midfielder

Team information
- Current team: Peñarol
- Number: 20

Youth career
- Peñarol

Senior career*
Years	Team	Apps	(Gls)
2025–	Peñarol	0	(0)

International career^{‡}
2024	Uruguay U15	4	(0)
2024	Uruguay U16	8	(0)
2024–2025	Uruguay U17	8	(1)
2025	Uruguay U18	2	(0)
2026–	Uruguay U20	3	(0)
2025–	Uruguay	1	(0)
- * Club domestic league appearances and goals as of 11 October 2025 ‡ National team caps and goals as of 21 September 2026

Julio Nehúen Daguer González (born 22 February 2008) is a Uruguayan professional footballer who plays as a midfielder for Liga AUF Uruguaya club Peñarol and the Uruguay national team.

== Club career ==
Daguer is a youth academy graduate of Peñarol. He made his senior team debut for Peñarol on 27 August 2025 in a 3–0 cup win against IA Río Negro.

== International career ==
Daguer has represented Uruguay at various youth levels. He was part of Uruguay's squad at the 2023 South American U-15 Championship and the 2025 South American U-17 Championship.

In October 2025, he traveled with the Uruguay senior team to Malaysia as a sparring partner for friendlies against the Dominican Republic and Uzbekistan. With head coach Marcelo Bielsa naming a slim 17-player squad for these matches, Daguer was one of six sparring partners on the bench to fill the substitute spots for the match against the Dominican Republic on 10 October. He made his debut in injury time of the second half, replacing Agustín Álvarez, who had sustained an injury in the final minutes of the game. This made him the fourth-youngest player to debut for Uruguay and the youngest to make his Uruguay national team debut in the 21st century.

In June 2026, Daguer was selected as a training player to accompany the squad to the 2026 FIFA World Cup. In September 2026, he was named in the squad for the 2026 South American Games.

== Career statistics ==
=== Club ===
As of match played 27 October 2026

Appearances and goals by club, season and competition
Club	Season	League			Cup		Continental		Other		Total	
Club	Season	Division	Apps	Goals	Apps	Goals	Apps	Goals	Apps	Goals	Apps	Goals
Peñarol	2025	Liga AUF Uruguaya	0	0	1	0	0	0	0	0	1	0
Peñarol	2026	Liga AUF Uruguaya	0	0	3	0	0	0	0	0	3	0
Career total			0	0	4	0	0	0	0	0	4	0

=== International ===
As of match played 10 October 2025

Appearances and goals by national team and year
National team	Year	Apps	Goals
Uruguay	2025	1	0
Total		1	0

== Honours ==
Peñarol

- Copa Uruguay: 2025
