= Miguel Murillo (footballer, born 1993) =

Colombian footballer

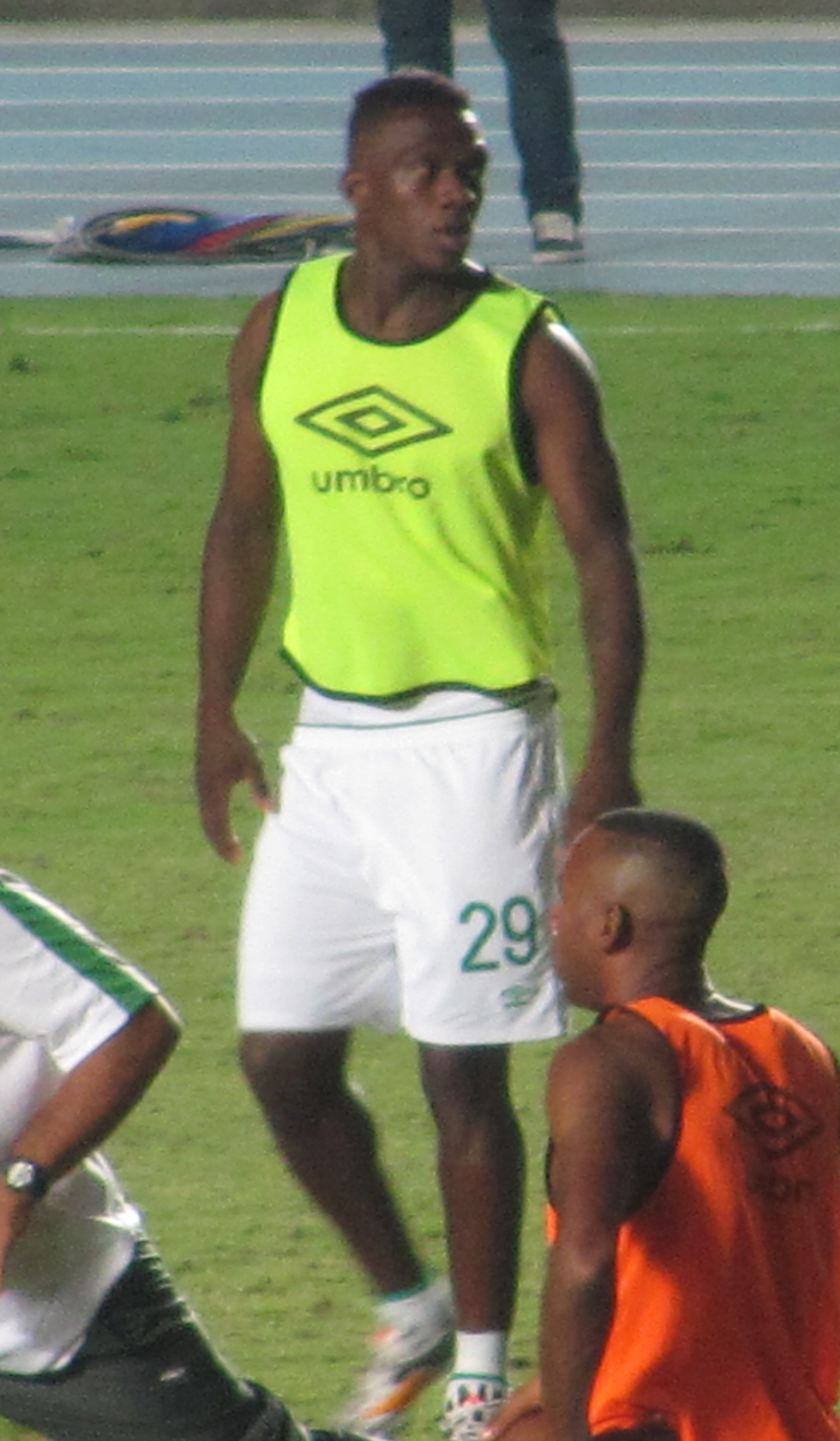

Personal information
- Full name: Miguel Ángel Murillo García
- Date of birth: 19 October 1993 (age 33)
- Place of birth: Cali, Colombia
- Height: 1.84 m (6 ft 0 in)
- Position: Forward

Team information
- Current team: Carlos A. Mannucci

Youth career
- Deportivo Cali

Senior career*
Years	Team	Apps	(Gls)
2012–2018	Deportivo Cali	114	(37)
2015–2016	→ Peñarol (loan)	18	(8)
2018	→ Veracruz (loan)	12	(2)
2019–2020	Águilas Doradas Rionegro	14	(2)
2021	Mushuc Runa S.C.	20	(7)
2022	Royal Pari F.C.	15	(0)
2023–	Alianza F.C.	7	(0)
- * Club domestic league appearances and goals as of 17 January 2021

Miguel Ángel Murillo García (born 19 October 1993) is a Colombian professional footballer who plays as forward for Carlos A. Mannucci.

== Honours ==
Deportivo Cali

- Superliga de Colombia: 2014
- Categoria Primera A: 2015–I

Peñarol

- Campeonato Uruguayo: 2015-16
