= Bruno Arady =

Uruguayan association footballer (born 2007)

Personal information
- Full name: Bruno Gustavo Arady Mata
- Date of birth: 1 July 2007 (age 19)
- Place of birth: Montevideo, Uruguay
- Height: 1.70 m (5 ft 7 in)
- Position: Forward

Team information
- Current team: Nacional
- Number: 26

Youth career
- Nacional

Senior career*
Years	Team	Apps	(Gls)
2024–	Nacional	13	(2)

International career^{‡}
2025–	Uruguay U18	4	(0)
- * Club domestic league appearances and goals as of 31 August 2025 ‡ National team caps and goals as of 10 June 2025

Bruno Gustavo Arady Mata (born 1 July 2007) is a Uruguayan professional footballer who plays as a forward for Uruguayan Primera División club Nacional.

== Career ==
Arady was called to the current squad of the Uruguay national under-18 football team. In June 2025 he took part in the U-18 Friendly Games, playing against Portugal, Japan and Australia. Further, in April 2025 he played a match at the 2025 Copa Libertadores.

As of April 2025 was announced his contract renewal with Nacional until 2028.
