= Facundo Kidd =

Uruguayan footballer (born 1997)

Personal information
- Full name: Facundo Kidd Álvarez
- Date of birth: 4 August 1997 (age 29)
- Place of birth: Colonia del Sacramento, Uruguay
- Height: 1.76 m (5 ft 9 in)
- Position: Left-back

Team information
- Current team: Progreso
- Number: 14

Youth career
- Juventud de Colonia
- 2013–2016: Plaza Colonia

Senior career*
Years	Team	Apps	(Gls)
2016–2024	Plaza Colonia	148	(5)
2021	→ Santiago Wanderers (loan)	23	(1)
2023	→ River Plate Montevideo (loan)	23	(0)
2025	Deportivo Maldonado	7	(0)
2025–	Progreso	13	(0)

International career^{‡}
2024–	Uruguay local	1	(0)
- * Club domestic league appearances and goals as of 28 April 2026 ‡ National team caps and goals as of 5 December 2024

Facundo Kidd Álvarez (born 4 August 1997) is a Uruguayan professional footballer who plays as a left-back for Liga AUF Uruguaya club Progreso.

== Club career ==
Kidd is a youth academy graduate of Plaza Colonia. In January 2025, he joined Deportivo Maldonado. He moved to Progreso six months later in July.

== International career ==
In December 2024, Kidd was called up to the Uruguay local national team for a friendly match against Brazilian club Grêmio.

== Honours ==
Plaza Colonia

- Uruguayan Segunda División: 2024
