= Estadio Campeón del Siglo =

Football stadium in Uruguay

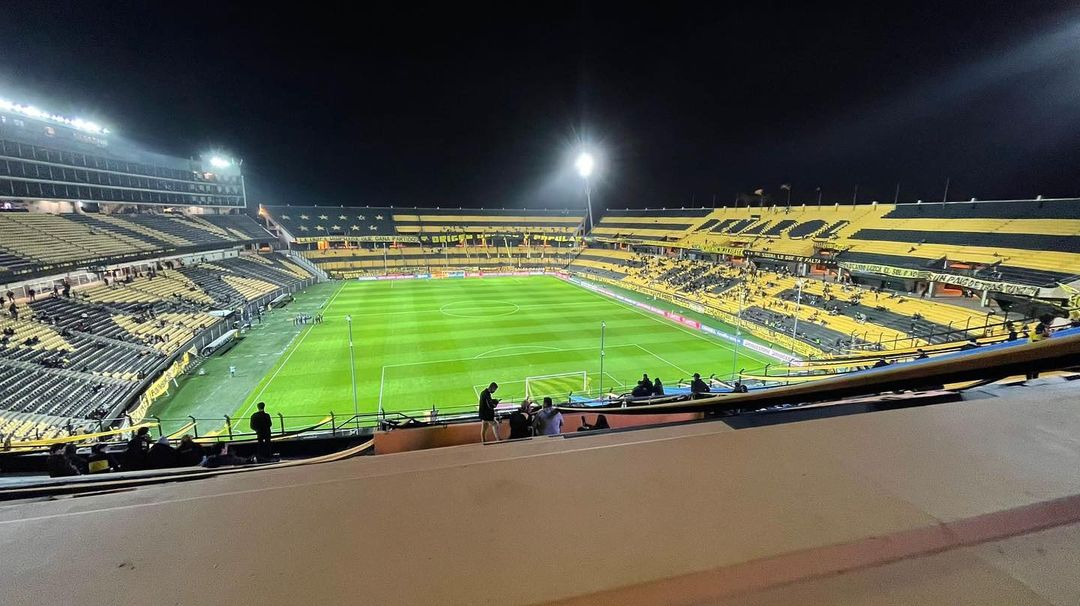
- View of the stadium in 2021
- Interactive map of Estadio Campeón del Siglo
- Full name: Estadio Campeón del Siglo
- Address: Cam. Manganga 11600; Montevideo; Uruguay
- Coordinates: 34°47′49″S 56°04′02″W
- Owner: C.A. Peñarol
- Capacity: 40,172
- Surface: Grass
- Scoreboard: LED TV
- Field size: 105 × 68 m

Construction
- Groundbreaking: February 10, 2014
- Built: 2014–2016
- Opened: March 28, 2016; 10 years ago
- Cost: US$40m
- Architects: Luis Rodríguez Tellado & associates
- General contractor: Saceem

Tenant
- Peñarol (2016-present)

Website
- peñarol.org/estadio

Estadio Campeón del Siglo is a football stadium located in Bañados de Carrasco, Montevideo, Uruguay, and the home ground of Peñarol, who plays in the First Division. It has a maximum capacity of 40,000.

== History ==
=== Background ===
Projects to own a stadium date back to the 20th century, but never managed to materialize. Although the club already owned the Estadio Contador Damiani (former Las Acacias) since 1916, it is currently not approved for Uruguayan Primera División matches by authorities, due to lack of security, and it is used by the club's youth divisions instead.

The first project dates back to 1933, when the team presented a project to build a stadium near Montevideo's promenade, same place in which now the popular Teatro de Verano is found. Half a century later, in 1998, the club announced plans, presenting a real life model, of a stadium to be built in the Franklin D. Roosevelt park near Avenida Gianattassio, in Canelones. On the successive years, under the command of club president José Pedro Damiani, continuous projects were presented, which all planned for a 40 thousand seat stadium.

==== The Parque Rodó Stadium ====
Considered the first project held by Peñarol for a club-owned stadium, it is registered in the club's 1933 Annual Report & Financial Statements, in which '(...)it is proposed and less than solved the practical execution of Parque Rodó Stadium'. In this document, a 30 thousand capacity multi-purpose stadium is planned. It was thought to hold basketball, cycling, boxing and volleyball events, apart from the club's most successful and popular sport, football.

==== The 'Damiani-Moore' Stadium ====
Presented in 2005. It would be located in Canelones, with an approximate capacity of 32.500 people. It was shaped similarly to Peñarol's then local stadium, Estadio Centenario, and its stands were to be named in honour of the club's greatest glories, such as, for example Obdulio Varela, Juan Schiaffino, Fernando Morena, Pablo Bengoechea, Diego Aguirre, Alberto Spencer and Ladislao Mazurkiewicz.

==== Project to build a stadium in the Franklin D. Roosevelt park ====
Presented in 2011, the project implied a U$S 13 million investment, with an initial capacity of 35.000 spectators, open to further expansions. A proposal was presented to the local government (Intendencia Departamental de Canelones), with an estimate of 25.286 tickets to be sold at the inaugural match. Ultimately, doubts originated if the site (donated by a private to be used as a public park) was allowed to be destined to the project, plus environmental impact studies and neighbour protests against the stadiums construction, ended with the cancellation of the project.

==== Stadium buyout projects ====
As a result of the several failed attempts to build its own stadium, Peñarol tried, several times over the last three decades, to buy and take charge of already built stadiums.

In 1993 a proposal was made to take charge of the Estadio Charrúa, of municipal property, giving away the Estadio Contador Damiani as part of the payment. It did not succeed. Then again, in 2001, Peñarol tried to buy said stadium again, pretending to expand the venue from a 10.000 to 30.000 spectators, in an usufruct of thirty years. Another usufruct was then planned, this time involving Estadio Centenario, over a deal with Uruguays football association (AUF), the Stadium Official Administrators (CAFO) and the municipal government. These projects, never got past the proposals, which got withdrawn or denied.

=== Stadium construction ===
In September 2012, club president Juan Pedro Damiani presented plans to build a 40,005 people stadium on the outskirts of Montevideo, near recently completed route 102. It would comply with all FIFA standards and regulations, having a 105 x 68 metres football pitch, a high-technology digital scoreboard, conference rooms for up to 70 people, 107 executive boxes, plus the club's headquarters and museum would be moved to the new stadium.

As the club lacked sufficient funds to make an operation of such magnitude, a joint venture was formed with local football television rights holders Tenfield; and a loan of about U$S 20 million by Banco de la República Oriental del Uruguay, Uruguay's state bank, was agreed. The deal implied Tenfield owned the rights to decide the field's commercial name, and all of the static & adboard publicity shown.

On December 19, 2013, a symbolic foundation stone, which can now be found by the main building's hall, was laid by the club president, box holders and club celebrities. By 10 February 2014, the construction broke ground.

Construction was expected to be concluded by September 2015, but due to several factors was delayed up to December. It was then finally delayed one more time to be finally inaugurated by March 2016.

== Inauguration ==
In February 2016, details about the grounds inauguration were released. According to initial planning, an important show was meant to take place was on March 27, 2016, with about four-thousand artists and popular ex-footballers invited, such as Jorge Drexler, Fito Páez, Illya Kuryaki and the Valderramas, Néstor Gonçalves, Fernando Morena, Walter Olivera, and also the presence of Uruguayan president Tabaré Vázquez. The final date was then moved onto March 30.

=== Inaugural match ===
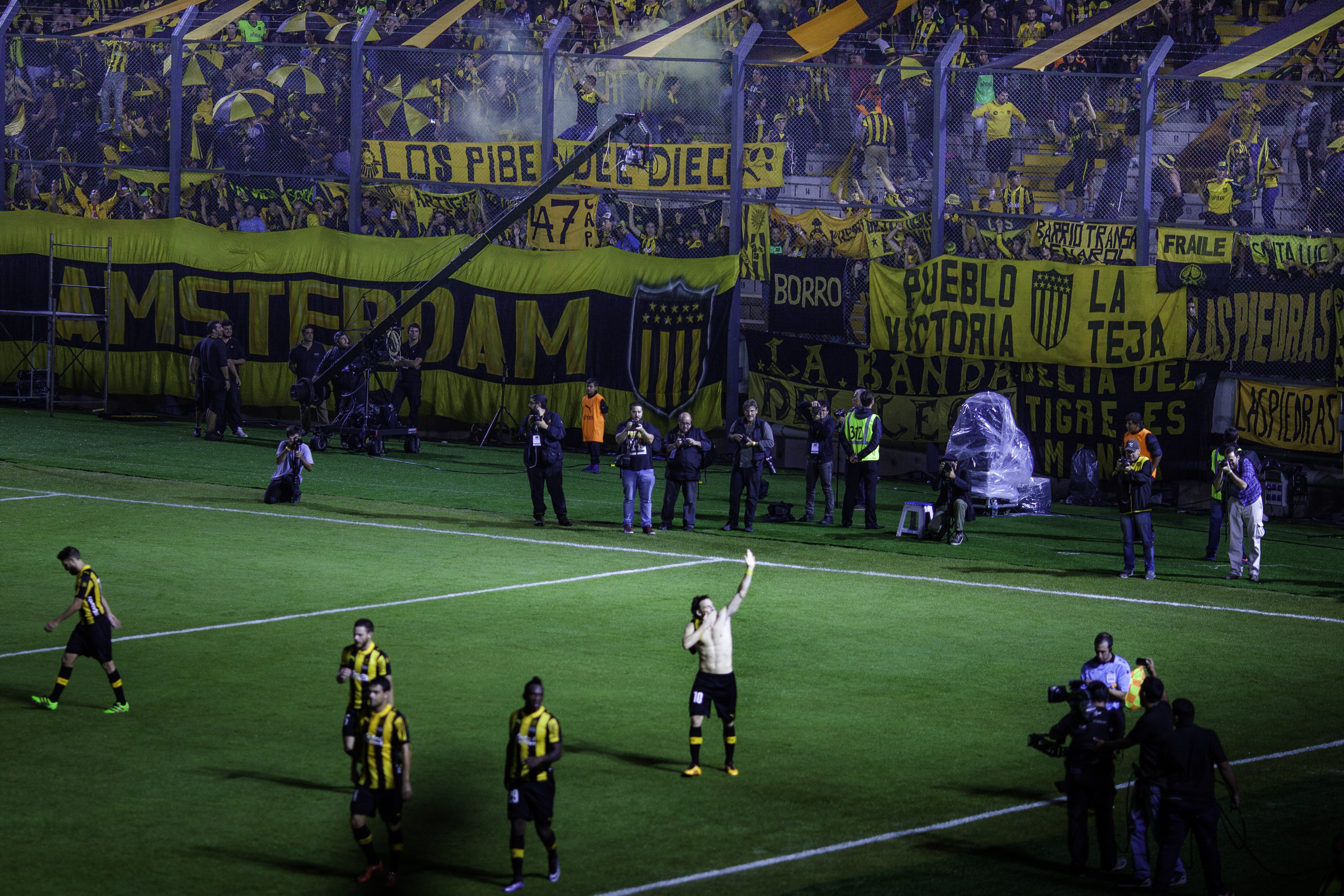
Diego Forlán scored the first goal ever in the stadium.

The stadium was inaugurated on March 28, 2016, with a friendly match against then current Copa Libertadores champions Club Atlético River Plate from Argentina. Peñarol won 4–1 and Diego Forlán scored the first goal at the new stadium. On May 26, 1938 Club Atlético River Plate inaugurated their stadium Estadio Monumental Antonio Vespucio Liberti against Peñarol, which the locals won by 3–1. That's part of the reason why Peñarol opted for River Plate as their invitee.

March 28, 2016	C.A. Peñarol (Uruguay)	4–1	(Argentina) C.A. River Plate	Montevideo, Uruguay
22:30 (UTC-03:00)	Diego Forlán 19' (yellow card) 20'; Miguel Murillo 40'; Luis Aguiar 49'; Cristian Palacios 72'	Report	Ignacio Fernández 49'	Stadium: Estadio Campeón del Siglo; Attendance: unspecified Referee: Andrés Cunha (Uruguay); Assistant referees: Carlos Pastorino (Uruguay) , Mauricio Espinosa (Uruguay); Fourth official: Claudia Umpiérrez (Uruguay)

=== Inaugural ceremony: ´La Fiesta del Siglo´ ===
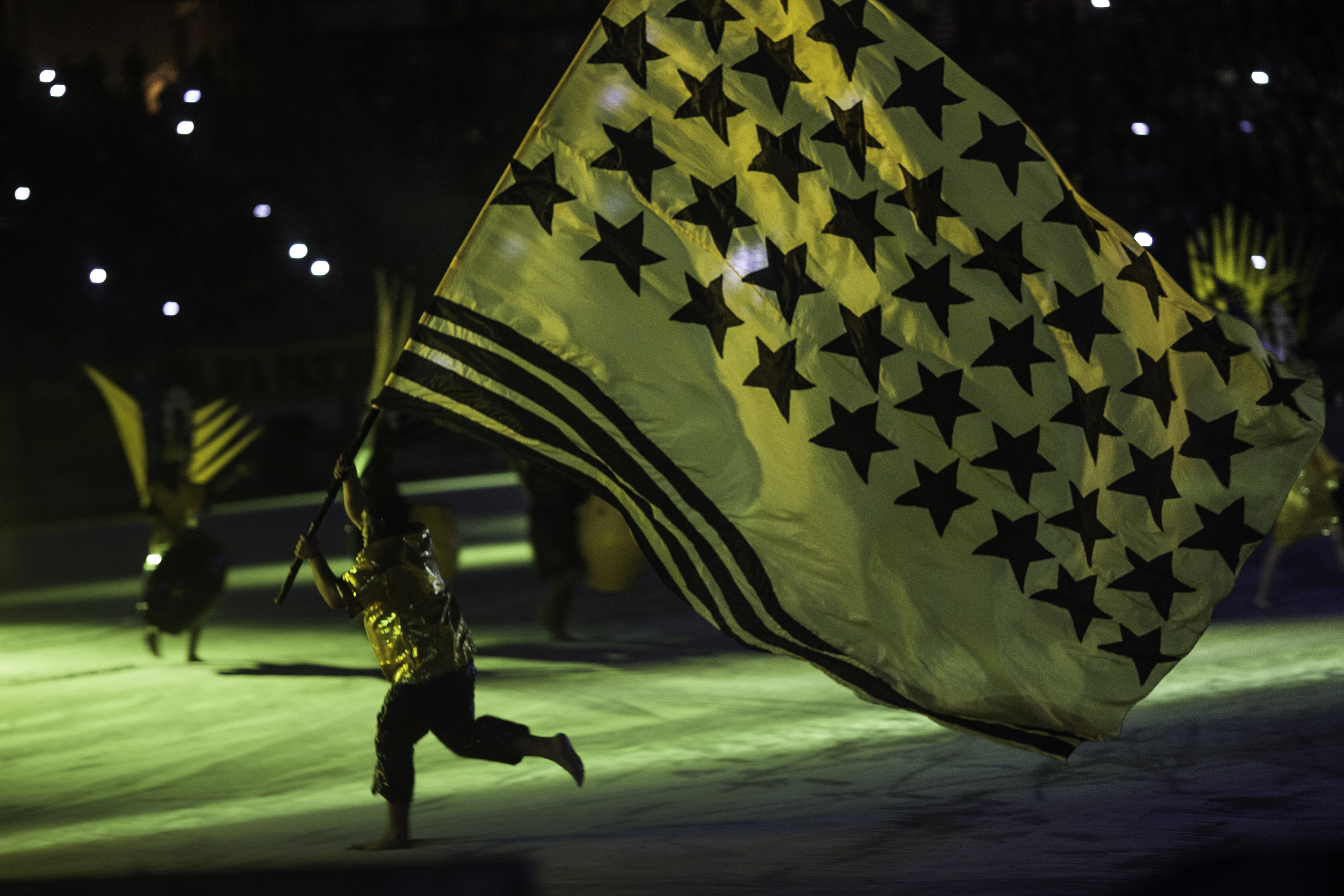
Cuerda de tambores on the Fiesta del Siglo

An approximately 2 hour-and-a-half-long show was held on March 30, 2016, divided into 4 particular segments about the club's history, which involved a cuerda de tambores of about 200 musicians, special presence of club legends such as Fernando Morena or Pablo Bengoechea, an open-air act about the club's history described as a modern opera, giant mobile structures akin to football players, music acts by Jorge Drexler -who wrote a song for the occasion, named ´La vida entera´- Hugo Fattoruso, Fito Paéz, Mandrake Wolf and others; and a final closure with the presence of all of the academy players following a choreography accompanied by 3-D mapped projections on the pitch.

Rubén Rada and Illya Kuryaki and the Valderramas were also expected to star, but had to cancel due to calendar issues.

=== First official match ===
The first official match was held on Saturday, April 9, with Peñarol hosting Danubio on the closing phase of the Campeonato Uruguayo 2015/2016. The locals won 2–1, with Nicolás Albarracín scoring the first official goal.

April 9, 2016	C.A. Peñarol	2–1	Danubio F.C.	Montevideo, Uruguay
19:00 (UTC-03:00)	Nicolás Albarracín 20'; Miguel Murillo (yellow card) 23'; Cristian Palacios 29'; Miguel Murillo (red card) 77'	Report	Giovanni Zarfino (yellow card) 23'; José Luis Rodríguez (yellow card) 34' (red card) 66'; Carlos Grosmüller 78' (pen.)	Stadium: Estadio Campeón del Siglo; Attendance: 35,000; Referee: Leodan González (Uruguay); Assistant referees: Nicolás Tarán (Uruguay) , Marcelo Alonso (Uruguay)

== Stands ==
With a total capacity of 43,000 spectators, the stadium is divided in the Frank Henderson (North and Main), Washington Cataldi (West), José Pedro Damiani (South), and Gastón Güelfi (East) stands, named after notable club presidents.

=== Frank Henderson stand ===
Capacity: 12.200 seated

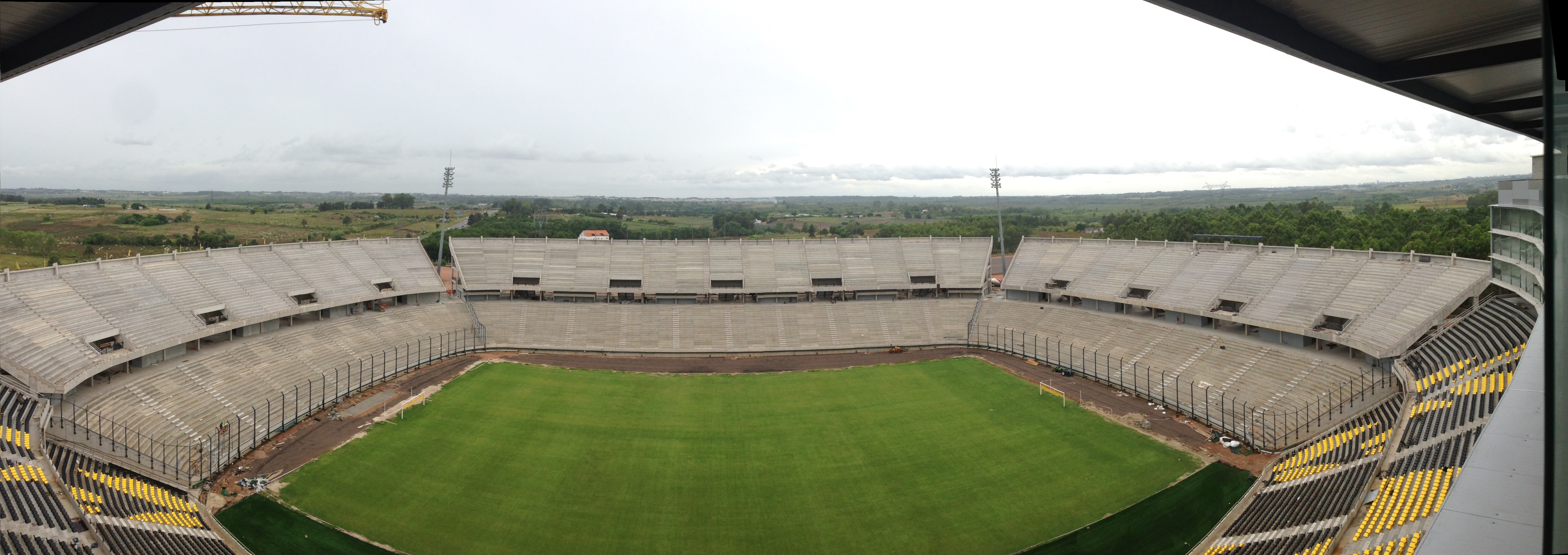
View from the Frank Henderson Stand. From left to right: G. Guelfi, J.P. Damiani and W. Cataldi stands.

Named after founder and first club president Frank Henderson, it is a two-storied all-seater stand that runs along the north edge of the pitch, in addition to three rows of boxes, destinated to VIPs, invitees, executive and familiar uses. Finally, a fourth -and final- row is destinated to broadcasting services. Because of this, it is denominated as the Main or Official stand.

As of the time, it is the only all-seater stand, mainly designated to season-ticket holders, and thus, the most expensive of them all. The seats are arranged and coloured in such a way that a mosaic depicting the Campeón del Siglo – a motto adopted by fans in the late 20th century, which the club adopted as an institutional trademark after being awarded as Best southamerican team in the XX century by the IFFHS – logo is formed.

The stand also features the largest concourse area in the stadium, containing the club's headquarters, museum, administrative offices, first aid rooms, and conference rooms. It does also contain both the local and visitor reception areas, four dressing rooms (a pair for each team: one for the first team and the other for the youth team), and the dugouts.

Being the main face of the stadium, monuments of all of the club glories depicting photographies, telling their club history and listing their achievements were erected right before the stadium's entrance, in a passage denominated Paseo de las Glorias.

A historic Henschel train engine from the 1950s was also placed at the stadium's entrance, in a manner to symbolize the club's tight relationship with locomotives at its origins. This action caused controversy between train enthusiasts and AFE, the state's rail administration; as the train's purchase was authorised by a state official which was, at the same time, a member of the club's board of directors and because the German steam engine was bought after the nationalization and was fueled by Oil instead of Coal, the source of the nickname "Carbonero" for the club, a third source of controversy was that for trabsportation the Drawbar joining the locomotive and its tender was severed to haul the two pieces in separate trucks.

=== Washington Cataldi stand ===
Capacity: 8.400 standing

Named after deceased club president Washington Cataldi, under whom -cooperating with Gastón Güelfi- Peñarol reigned locally and internationally, obtaining two Intercontinental Cups (1961, 1966), three Copa Libertadores de América (1960, 1961, 1966), and nine Primera División trophies (1958, 1959, 1960, 1961, 1962, 1964, 1965, 1967, 1968) in which the club achieved its first Golden Quinquenio by winning five consecutive titles.

The stand runs along the western edge of the pitch, and is divided into two tiers, designated for local standing fans; and lacks any type of luxuries except for bathrooms and some food locals. Because of this, it is one of the denominated Popular stands (along with the eastern stand), and its pricings are way cheaper than both the north mainstand and the southern Family stand.

=== Gastón Güelfi stand ===
Capacity: 8.400 standing

Named after deceased club president Gastón Güelfi, who along Gastón Güelfi, gave Peñarol huge local and international successes, it is a two-tiered stand designated for both local and visitor standing fans, whose proportion is decided by the club along with local authorities based on the magnitude of the event. It does also belong to the Popular type of stand, lacking any luxury except for basic services, and being one of the cheapest along the Washington Cataldi stand. It runs along the eastern edge of the pitch.

Peñarol does also own a basketball arena named after said person, the Palacio Peñarol Contador Gastón Güelfi.

=== José Pedro Damiani stand ===
Capacity: 14.000 seated

A two-tiered stand, destinated to families (thus the Familiar stand), it is a standing stand for the moment, although club president Juan Pedro Damiani has repeatedly stated it would be modified into an all-seater stand by September 2016. As of June 4, 2016, open boxes were made available for season-ticket holders. Because of this, pricings are moderate with focus on families.

The stand is named after deceased president and father of actual president Juan Pedro Damiani, whose management abilities saved the club from economical crisis and brought another Quinquenio to the club. Peñarol does own another field named after him, popularly known as Las Acacias.

== Transport ==
The stadium is located approximately 16.6 kilometres (10.3 miles) northeast from the centre of Montevideo.

It is accessible by car from routes 102 and 8, with parking lots are available in the stadium premises, plus future parking lots have started construction. Lateral streets are dirt-based, although their surfacing has started.

Bus lines 103, 316, DM1 y D8 serve the stadium from Montevideo, while 703 704 724 757 serve the stadium from Costa de Oro, meanwhile lines 7A 10A 14A 14AB 14AR 701 706 724 serve the stadium from Pando and northwest (line 757 also covers Las Piedras in the northeast), with their respective bus stops located 507 and 473 meters from the venue. A bus terminal is pending construction in order to shorten loading times and alleviate traffic congestion.

== See also ==
- List of football stadiums in Uruguay
- Lists of stadiums
