= Uruguay national under-18 football team =

National U-18 association football team

Uruguay Under-18
- Nickname: La Celeste (The Sky Blue)
- Association: Uruguayan Football Association
- Confederation: CONMEBOL
- Head coach: Diego Pérez
- FIFA code: URU
First colours	Second colours

The Uruguay national under-18 football team, also known in Spanish as "sub-18", represents Uruguay in association football at under-18 age level and is controlled by the Uruguayan Football Association, the governing body for football in Uruguay. It is a feeder team for the main Uruguay national football team. It is made up of players of Uruguayan nationality under 18 years of age, which represents the Uruguayan Football Association in international friendly matches, conceived in order to give opportunities to players aged between the under-17 and under-20 categories.

== History ==
In May 2025 the team was called on the occasion of an international championship in Switzerland, the team played under the technical direction of Diego Pérez, preparing their participation in the upcoming 2027 South American U-20 Championship. Some of its more notable players are Bruno Arady (Club Nacional de Football), Facundo Domínguez (Club Nacional de Football), Rodrigo Dudok (Defensor Sporting), Ignacio Molina (Montevideo City Torque) and Alexander Velázquez (Danubio F.C.).

== Results and fixtures ==
The following is a list of match results in the last 12 months, as well as any future matches that have been scheduled.

Win Draw Loss

=== 2025 ===
23 October Friendly	Uruguay	1–1	Colombia U17	Barros Blancos
		Report		Stadium: Complejo Celeste

== Coaching staff ==
As of 3 April 2025

Position	Name
Head coach	(Uruguay) Diego Pérez
Assistant coach	(Uruguay) Ignacio González
Goalkeeping coach	(Uruguay) Ignacio Bordad

== Players ==
=== Current squad ===
The following 29 players are called up for the friendly matches against Colombia U17 on 21 and 23 October 2025.

Caps and goals (Note: Statistics here are calculated with the help of articles published in Uruguayan Football Association's official website, posts from official X account and other reliable websites.) correct as of 23 October 2025, after the match against Colombia U17.

No.	Pos.	Player	Date of birth (age)	Caps	Goals	Club
1	GK	Felipe Ortiz	6 November 2007 (age 18)	5	0	(Uruguayan Football Association) Deportivo Maldonado
12	GK	Paulo da Costa	13 June 2008 (age 18)	2	0	(Uruguayan Football Association) Peñarol
23	GK	Lucas Quimbo	14 November 2007 (age 18)	3	0	(Uruguayan Football Association) Juventud
40	GK	Tobías Albanell	9 June 2007 (age 19)	0	0	(Uruguayan Football Association) Montevideo City Torque
2	DF	Rodrigo Álvez	9 October 2007 (age 19)	4	0	(Uruguayan Football Association) Peñarol
3	DF	Brian Barboza	14 May 2008 (age 18)	3	0	(Uruguayan Football Association) Peñarol
4	DF	Federico Bais	29 August 2008 (age 18)	8	0	(Uruguayan Football Association) Nacional
13	DF	Facundo Balatti	9 June 2008 (age 18)	4	0	(Uruguayan Football Association) Danubio
14	DF	Mateo Caballero	2 February 2007 (age 19)	3	0	(Uruguayan Football Association) Defensor Sporting
16	DF	Román Clematte	6 September 2007 (age 19)	7	0	(Uruguayan Football Association) Nacional
17	DF	Luca Fraga	18 February 2007 (age 19)	7	0	(Uruguayan Football Association) Liverpool Montevideo
25	DF	Benjamín García	4 February 2007 (age 19)	5	0	(Uruguayan Football Association) Montevideo City Torque
	DF	Yuri Oyarzo	13 December 2007 (age 18)	1	0	(Uruguayan Football Association) Racing Montevideo
5	MF	Julio Daguer	22 February 2008 (age 18)	2	0	(Uruguayan Football Association) Peñarol
6	MF	Pablo Cardozo	5 February 2007 (age 19)	7	0	(Uruguayan Football Association) Danubio
8	MF	Tomás Shaw	31 August 2007 (age 19)	4	1	(Uruguayan Football Association) Montevideo City Torque
10	MF	Pablo Alcoba	10 November 2008 (age 17)	3	0	(Uruguayan Football Association) Albion
11	MF	Mateo Alcoba	10 November 2008 (age 17)	4	1	(Uruguayan Football Association) Albion
15	MF	Mauro Martínez	19 January 2007 (age 19)	7	0	(Uruguayan Football Association) Nacional
19	MF	Luciano González	7 March 2008 (age 18)	3	1	(Uruguayan Football Association) Nacional
20	MF	Facundo Carámbula	12 September 2007 (age 19)	5	0	(Uruguayan Football Association) Rentistas
	MF	Mateo Soria	14 March 2007 (age 19)	6	0	(Uruguayan Football Association) Nacional
7	FW	Alan Torterolo	3 January 2008 (age 18)	1	0	(Uruguayan Football Association) Defensor Sporting
9	FW	Nicolás Azambuja	28 March 2008 (age 18)	2	0	(Uruguayan Football Association) Danubio
18	FW	Joaquín Pereyra	29 April 2007 (age 19)	3	0	(Uruguayan Football Association) Liverpool Montevideo
21	FW	Alexander Velázquez	9 April 2007 (age 19)	9	0	(Uruguayan Football Association) Danubio
22	FW	Lautaro Navarro	10 February 2008 (age 18)	1	1	(Uruguayan Football Association) Defensor Sporting
26	FW	Facundo Martínez	4 February 2008 (age 18)	2	0	(Uruguayan Football Association) Montevideo City Torque
	FW	Ignacio Molina	7 December 2007 (age 18)	5	0	(Uruguayan Football Association) Montevideo City Torque

=== Recent call-ups ===
The following players have also been called up to the squad in the past twelve months.

Pos.	Player	Date of birth (age)	Caps	Goals	Club	Latest call-up
Notes: ^{INJ} = Withdrew due to injury; ^{PRE} = Preliminary squad; ^{WD} = Player withdrew from the squad due to non-injury issue.

== See also ==
- Uruguay national football team
- Uruguay local national football team
- Uruguay national under-23 football team
- Uruguay national under-20 football team
- Uruguay national under-17 football team
- Uruguay national under-15 football team
