= Federico Andueza =

Uruguayan footballer (born 1997)

Personal information
- Full name: Federico Andueza Velazco
- Date of birth: 25 May 1997 (age 29)
- Place of birth: Juan Lacaze, Uruguay
- Height: 1.89 m (6 ft 2 in)
- Position: Centre-back

Team information
- Current team: Chacarita Juniors (on loan from Sarmiento)
- Number: 6

Youth career
- Montevideo Wanderers

Senior career*
Years	Team	Apps	(Gls)
2015–2019	Montevideo Wanderers	27	(2)
2020–2022	Plaza Colonia	6	(0)
2020–2021	→ Central Córdoba SdE (loan)	22	(0)
2022	→ Sarmiento (loan)	34	(2)
2023–	Sarmiento	0	(0)
2023	→ Junior (loan)	11	(0)
2023	→ Liverpool (loan)	7	(0)
2024	→ Central Córdoba SdE (loan)	4	(0)
2025–	→ Chacarita Juniors (loan)	12	(1)

International career
2016	Uruguay U20	4	(0)
- * Club domestic league appearances and goals as of 17:39, 26 May 2025 (UTC)

Federico Andueza Velazco (born 25 May 1997) is a Uruguayan footballer who plays as a centre-back for Chacarita Juniors on loan from Sarmiento.

== Honours ==
Central Córdoba (SdE)

- Copa Argentina: 2024
