= Iván Leguizamón =

Paraguayan association football player

Personal information
- Full name: Iván Ezequiel Leguizamón
- Date of birth: 3 July 2002 (age 24)
- Place of birth: Asunción, Paraguay
- Position: Midfielder

Team information
- Current team: Olimpia
- Number: 7

Youth career
- Argentino Del Viso
- Tigre
- Deportivo Armenio
- San Lorenzo

Senior career*
Years	Team	Apps	(Gls)
2022–2024	San Lorenzo	101	(7)
2025–	Olimpia	53	(8)

International career^{‡}
2023–	Paraguay	1	(0)
- * Club domestic league appearances and goals as of 26 May 2026 ‡ National team caps and goals as of 21 November 2023

Iván Ezequiel Leguizamón (born 3 July 2002) is a Paraguayan professional footballer who plays as a midfielder for Olimpia and the Paraguay national team.

== Club career ==
Born in Paraguay, he moved with his mother and three of his siblings to Argentina when he was three years-old. He began his career in the youth ranks of Argentino Del Viso, Tigre, and Deportivo Armenio, before moving to San Lorenzo in 2019.

He made his debut with the San Lorenzo first team on February 22, 2022 against Defensa y Justicia. In 2022, his first season playing with the first team at the club he made more than 20 appearances, with the vast majority being starting appearances. He scored his first league goal for the club on 14 June 2022, in a 3-3 draw with Arsenal de Sarandí.

== International career ==
In November 2023 he received his first call-up to the Paraguay national team, for CONMEBOL World Cup qualifying matches against Chile and Colombia.

== Personal life ==
Born in Asunción, Paraguay, his father died when he was six months old following an accident. He has six siblings, but the two oldest chose to stay in Paraguay when he moved to the Del Viso area of Pilar Partido in Buenos Aires, Argentina with his mother aged two years-old. His sister Zoraida, is also a football player and plays for SAT in the Argentina Football Association’s Campeonato de Fútbol Femenino.
