= C.A. Progreso =

Uruguayan football club

Progreso
- Full name: Club Atlético Progreso
- Nicknames: Gauchos del Pantanoso; Los gauchos del Pantanoso; Gauchos; Aurirrojos; Los de La Teja
- Founded: 30 April 1917; 109 years ago
- Ground: Parque Abraham Paladino
- Capacity: 8,000
- Chairman: Fabián Canobbio
- Manager: Leonel Rocco
- League: Liga AUF Uruguaya
- 2025: Liga AUF Uruguaya, 12th of 16
- Website: www.clubatleticoprogreso.com
Home colours	Away colours

Club Atlético Progreso, also known simply as Progreso, is a professional football club based in the La Teja neighbourhood of Montevideo, Uruguay. The club was founded on 30 April 1917 by members of the local stonemasons' union and immigrant workers, many of them Spanish and several adherents of the anarchist movement. Progreso plays its home matches at Parque Abraham Paladino, a ground holding 8,000 spectators. The club currently competes in the Liga AUF Uruguaya, the top tier of Uruguayan football, having returned to the division for the 2024 season after relegation in 2021; Progreso finished the 2025 season in 12th place of 16. The club's sole Primera División title came in 1989, during the presidency of the oncologist and future President of the Republic Tabaré Vázquez.

Beyond its playing record, Progreso is widely known in Uruguay for its historical association with left-wing politics and the labour movement, a link rooted in the club's anarchist and trade-unionist origins and reinforced over decades by its close ties to Vázquez and the Frente Amplio. The club has also built a reputation for community and social welfare work in La Teja, including a children's dining hall that operated for almost thirty years and an ongoing educational partnership with Uruguay's technical education authority. The club's own directors have, on at least one occasion, publicly stated that the institution is formally apolitical.

== History ==
=== Founding and early years ===
The club was founded on 30 April 1917. According to a monograph on the club's community history, its founders were drawn primarily from the picapedreros (stonemasons') union, alongside immigrant workers, mostly Spanish, some of whom identified with the anarchist movement. The magazine Revista Utopía has separately dated the club's founding to 1914. The club's first match was played on 26 May 1918, with Progreso beating Club Maroñas 2–0. Progreso won its first title with the Divisional Intermedia (Second Division at that time) in 1938. It went on to win it the next year as well, along with two more championships in 1956 and 1963. The club has three Segunda División championships: in 1945, 1979, and 2005–06. In 1975 and 1978, Progreso won the Tercera División (Segunda División Amateur).

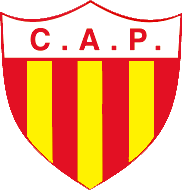
Old logo

Progreso's first team kit in 1917 was white with black stripes. The kit expressed the team's affinity with the anarchist movement. The strip was later changed to red and yellow, the colours of Catalonia, which was known for its identification with the Spanish Revolution.

=== Rise to prominence (1979–1989) ===
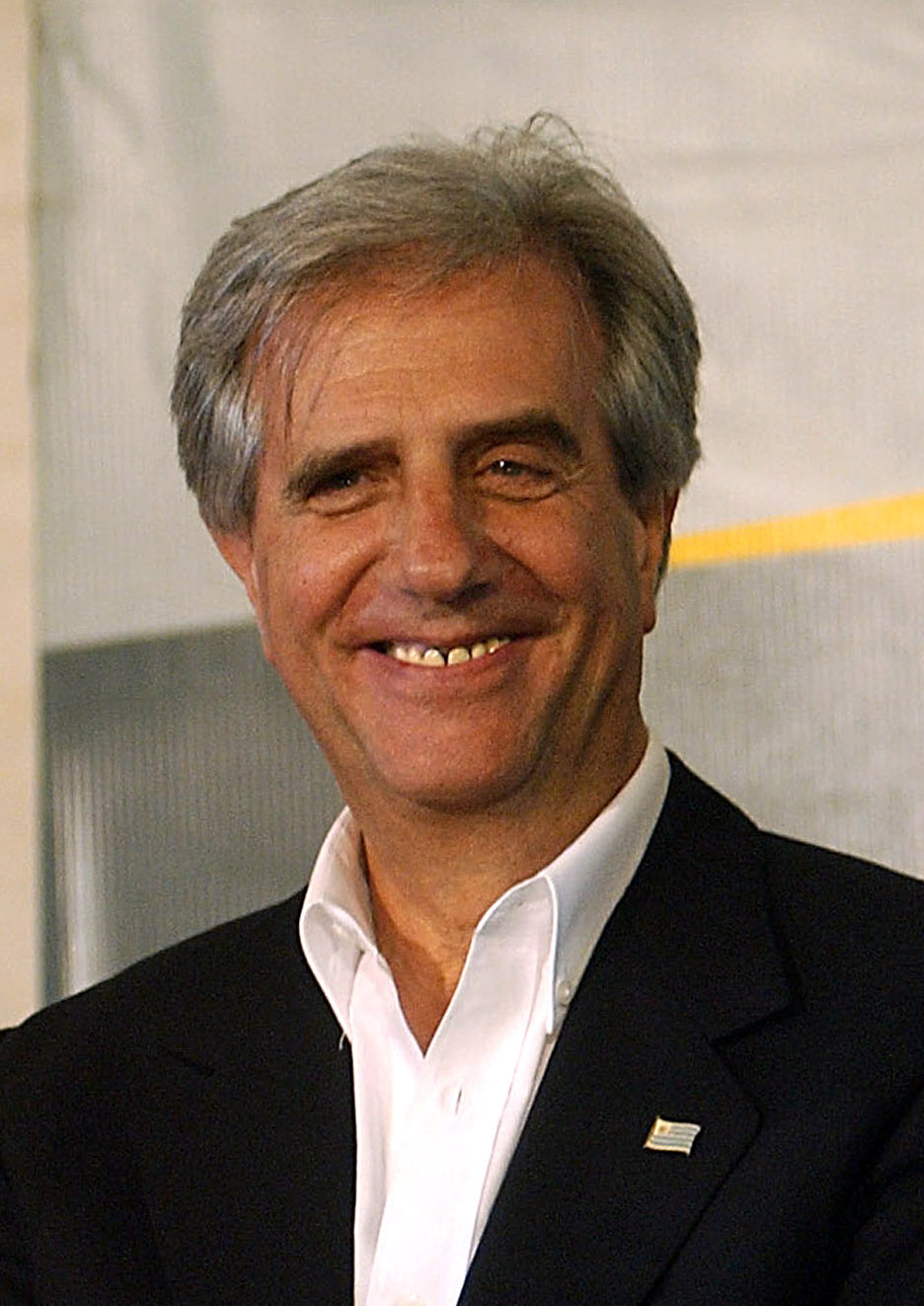
Tabaré Vázquez, seen here in 2007, was president of Progreso between 1979 and 1989. He later became Intendant of Montevideo and eventually President of Uruguay on two occasions.

Tabaré Vázquez, later Intendant of Montevideo and twice President of Uruguay, was elected vice-president of Progreso in 1978, when the club was playing in the third division, and became president the following season as the team achieved promotion. His family had deep connections to the club before him; his grandfather, José Vázquez, was one of the club's founders, and his father and an uncle were later, respectively, a delegate and a player at the club. Vázquez, who had himself trialled unsuccessfully as a goalkeeper at Wanderers before co-founding the smaller La Teja club Arbolito in 1958, also served as treasurer of the organising committee for the 1980–81 Mundialito and as president of Uruguay's university football league between 1984 and 1987.

Under Vázquez's presidency, Progreso entered the most successful period in its history, remaining in the Primera División for 16 consecutive seasons. The club won the Torneo Competencia in 1985, its first title at the top level, and the following year qualified for the 1987 Copa Libertadores, where it finished third in a group consisting of fellow Uruguayan club Nacional and Peruvian clubs San Agustín and Alianza Lima.

In 1987, Vázquez's name was put forward for the presidency of the Asociación Uruguaya de Fútbol (AUF). However, he was blocked from the position for a third time in five years. The veto is widely attributed to the influence of Club Atlético Peñarol president José Pedro Damiani, a prominent Colorado Party figure who was said to have relayed instructions from then-president Julio María Sanguinetti against Vázquez's candidacy. According to the political scientist Antonio Cardarello, the episode has usually been read as an attempt to deny a public platform to a rising figure of the left. However, an alternative account holds that Peñarol and Nacional were instead reluctant to see a director so closely tied to one of their traditional rivals take charge of the governing body. Vázquez's own recollection, given years later, was that a functioning football association required a president close to the government of the day, and that his repeated vetoes reflected his distance from it.

Progreso's greatest footballing achievement followed two years later: in 1989 the club won the Primera División, the only championship in the history of the Uruguayan league to be decided by a single round-robin tournament (13 games), a format adopted because of a calendar conflict with national and international cups that year. Vázquez was elected Intendant of Montevideo the same year, becoming the first mayor of the capital from a left-wing party. Progreso qualified for the 1990 Copa Libertadores as league champions, winning a group containing Defensor Sporting, Pepeganga Margarita and Mineros de Guayana before being eliminated in the second round by Barcelona of Ecuador.

=== Decline and modern era ===
Progreso's long spell in the top flight ended with relegation to the Segunda División in 1995. The club alternated between the first and second divisions through the following decades and returned to continental competition when it qualified for the 2020 Copa Libertadores. Progreso was relegated from the Primera División again in 2021 and won promotion back to the top flight for the 2024 season.

== Political associations ==
Progreso's reputation as a left-leaning institution rests substantially on its long association with Tabaré Vázquez, who presided over the club during its most successful era before going on to lead Montevideo's city government and, from 2005, the national government as Uruguay's first president from a left-wing coalition. Uruguayan commentators have repeatedly cited Progreso, alongside the wider intersection of football and politics in the country, as an illustration of how sporting institutions and party politics have remained closely intertwined since the 20th century.

Vázquez died on 6 December 2020, a death that carried particular weight in La Teja given his roots in the neighbourhood and his years at Progreso. An ethnographic account of the barrio recorded that news of his death, on a Sunday night, prompted residents to applaud from their doorways, that flags of the Frente Amplio appeared on the streets from early the following morning, and that a large crowd gathered at the Club Progreso premises, where the former president was honoured. His funeral cortège subsequently passed through the neighbourhood on its way to La Teja cemetery.

The relationship between the club and party politics has occasionally become a matter of public dispute. In February 2001, Progreso's directors wrote to the newspaper La República to deny a report suggesting that the retired general Líber Seregni (a founder of the Frente Amplio), or someone close to him, had sought to use the club's premises, and stated explicitly that the institution was "apolitical" and would not host meetings of a political character. The newspaper clarified in response that it had reported only an informal, verbally rejected question to a single club official, rather than any formal response or agreement.

=== 2022 stadium search controversy ===
In March 2022, during the campaign around a referendum to repeal parts of Uruguay's Ley de Urgente Consideración (LUC), Progreso issued a public statement condemning a search conducted by riot police (the Guardia Republicana) of the club's official shop at Parque Abraham Paladino during a match against Cerro. Footage circulated showing officers searching the premises for what a club employee described, according to press reports, as material supporting the "Sí" (Yes) side of the referendum campaign, and the club's directors said that fans had also been asked to remove items of clothing carrying political messages before entering the ground. The Ministry of the Interior rejected the club's characterisation of events, describing the search as a routine security procedure applied at sporting events generally and stating that no supporter had been denied entry. The incident occurred in the same year that another La Teja institution, the Club Social y Deportivo Villa Española, was placed under government intervention after its leadership took public positions on human rights and social activism.

== Community work ==
Progreso has, since the late 20th century, developed a reputation in La Teja for social and community initiatives that extend well beyond football, a role documented in a 2025 monograph produced for the Department of Social Work at the University of the Republic. The club's historian, Agustín Montemuiño, has attributed this to a deliberate departure from the purely recreational activities, such as picnics and social gatherings, that had traditionally characterised Uruguayan sports clubs.

=== Children's dining hall ===
In 1983, amid a severe economic crisis linked to the aftermath of Uruguay's civil-military dictatorship and the collapse of the "Tablita" exchange-rate policy, Progreso opened a children's dining hall (comedor infantil) to address hunger among children in La Teja. The initiative was driven by Vázquez and by the club official Daniel "Pistola" Marsicano, working alongside local priests and social workers. In its early years, before the state provided any support, the dining hall was sustained through donations organised by the Federation of University Students of Uruguay, contributions from local market vendors, and financial support from Uruguayans living abroad, including political exiles and members of the national football team. The Montevideo city government, led by Vázquez from 1990, subsequently began contributing to the project's upkeep. Demand rose again during Uruguay's 2002 economic crisis, but fell in the years that followed as public schools introduced their own meal programmes, and the dining hall closed in 2012 after nearly three decades of operation.

=== Educational and cultural centre ===
In 2012, Progreso reached an agreement with Uruguay's National Public Education Administration (ANEP), through its technical education branch, the Consejo de Educación Técnico Profesional (UTU), to open a socio-educational inclusion centre on club premises as part of the "Uruguay Progresa" programme. It initially offered vocational courses in computing and gastronomy to around 60 students. The centre later expanded to include a sports-focused secondary school track and courses in theatre and film. In 2018, to mark the club's centenary year, Progreso and the UTU restored the former Cine Teatro Miramar, which the club had acquired in 1969. It reopened as the Teatro Progreso cultural centre, later named the "Tabaré Vázquez" hall. The UTU uses the space for classes during the school year, while the club and local schools use it for cultural events at other times.

=== Other initiatives ===
The club ran a subsidised nursery on its premises during the 1970s and 1980s at the request of a group of local teachers, and operated a dental clinic for schoolchildren from 2007 to 2009. During the COVID-19 pandemic, from March to August 2020, club members, supporters and youth-football volunteers organised a communal soup kitchen at the club. It was funded by donations from neighbours, local businesses and the Montevideo city government, but was forced to close after several months owing to a shortfall in resources relative to demand. Progreso is also a member of "La Teja Vive", a neighbourhood collective of local institutions that organises further solidarity initiatives, including food collections and community festivities.

== Performance in CONMEBOL competitions ==
- Copa Libertadores: 3 appearances

1987: Group stage
1990: Second round
2020: First stage

== Continental record ==
Season	Competition	Round	Opponent	Score	Result	Aggregate
1990	Copa Libertadores	Group stage	(Uruguay) Defensor Sporting	1–1	0–0	1st
1990	Copa Libertadores	Group stage	(Venezuela) Mineros	1–1	1–3	1st
1990	Copa Libertadores	Group stage	(Venezuela) Pepeganga Margarita	2–0	1–0	1st
1990	Copa Libertadores	Second round	(Ecuador) Barcelona	2–2	2–0	2–4
2020	Copa Libertadores	First stage	(Ecuador) Barcelona	0–2	1–3	1–5

== Current squad ==
As of 22 March, 2026

Note: Flags indicate national team as defined under FIFA eligibility rules; some limited exceptions apply. Players may hold more than one non-FIFA nationality.

No.	Pos.	Nation	Player
1	GK	ARG	Andrés Mehring
2	DF	URU	Sebastián Cardozo
4	DF	URU	Marcos Paolini
5	MF	URU	Agustín Pinheiro
6	DF	URU	Federico Andueza (on loan from Atlético Sarmiento)
7	MF	URU	Fabricio Fernández
8	MF	URU	Adrián Colombino
9	FW	URU	Gary Silva
10	MF	URU	Ignacio Lemmo
11	FW	URU	Nahuel López (on loan from Club Nacional)
13	DF	URU	Hernán Carroso
14	DF	URU	Facundo Kidd
15	DF	URU	Mauro Martín
16	DF	URU	Gianfranco Trasante
17	FW	URU	Facundo de León

No.	Pos.	Nation	Player
18	MF	ARG	Gonzalo Silva
19	FW	URU	Joaquín Solleiro
20	FW	ARG	José Vanetta (on loan from Unión Santa Fe)
21	FW	URU	Juan Rivero
22	MF	ARG	Agustin Paz
23	FW	URU	Matteo Copelotti
24	MF	URU	Santiago Viera
25	FW	URU	Jonathan dos Santos
26	DF	URU	Deivis Santo
29	FW	URU	Nicolás Fernández
30	MF	URU	Agustín Codagnone
31	FW	URU	Federico Ruiz
33	GK	URU	Agustín Requena
40	DF	URU	Ayrton Cougo
93	FW	URU	Diego Sánchez

== Managers ==
This is an incomplete list of Progreso Managers.

- (Uruguay) Jorge González (April 2002–Dec 2002)
- (Uruguay) Mario Saralegui (Oct 2007–March 2008)
- (Uruguay) Raúl Moeller (Jan 2011–June 2011)
- (Uruguay) Leonardo Ramos (August 2011–Dec 2012)
- (Uruguay) Carlos Rodao (Jan 2013–April 2013)
- (Uruguay) Santiago Paz (May 2013–April 2014)
- (Uruguay) Juan Carlos Duarte (April 2014–November 2014)
- (Uruguay) Rubén Da Silva (November 2014–July 2015)
- (Uruguay) Juan Carlos Duarte (December 2015–June 2016)
- (Uruguay) Gabriel Añón (July 2016–October 2016)
- (Uruguay) Marcelo Méndez (October 2016–November 2018)
- (Uruguay) Leonel Rocco (November 2018–November 2020)

== Titles ==
=== Senior titles ===
Keys

- Record
- ^{(s)} Shared record

Type	Competition	Titles	Winning years
National (League)	Primera División	1	1989
National (League)	Segunda División	3	1945, 1979, 2005–06
National (League)	Divisional Intermedia	4	1938, 1939, 1956, 1963
National (League)	Segunda División Amateur	2	1975, 1978
National (Cups)	Copa de la Liga AUF	1	2026
National (Cups)	Torneo Competencia	1	1985
