= 2024 Copa Uruguay =

Copa AUF Uruguay 2024

Tournament details
- Country: Uruguay
- Dates: 10 August – 6 December 2024
- Teams: 32 (Proper competition); 58 (Including preliminary stage)

Final positions
- Champions: Defensor Sporting (3rd title)
- Runners-up: Nacional

Tournament statistics
- Matches played: 51
- Goals scored: 156 (3.06 per match)

The 2024 Copa Uruguay (officially known as Copa AUF Uruguay 2024), was the third edition of the Copa Uruguay, the country's national football cup tournament. The tournament began on 10 August 2024 with 58 teams participating and ended on 6 December 2024.

The defending champions Defensor Sporting won their third Copa Uruguay title in this edition of the competition, defeating Nacional on penalty kicks following a 2–2 draw in the final.

== Format changes ==
Starting from this season, the competition was trimmed down to 32 participating teams due to financial and scheduling concerns, considering that the previous year's competition had to be extended to April 2024. The competition was divided into a preliminary stage and five rounds in the competition proper, with ties in all stages played over a single match. 35 clubs from the Organización del Fútbol del Interior (OFI) entered a two-round preliminary stage in which they were drawn into four zones. The two winners from each zone as well as the winner of an additional interzonal match qualified for the competition proper.

The Copa Uruguay proper would be played by 32 teams: the 9 winners from the preliminary phase would be joined in the round of 32 by 10 teams from the Uruguayan Primera División, 6 from Segunda División, 4 from Primera División Amateur, 2 from Divisional D and 18 de Julio from Río Negro, the 2023 OFI Serie B champions, in a straight knockout competition. The amateur clubs from the Uruguayan Football Association (AUF) and OFI played their round of 32 match at home. From this point onwards, the winners played against each other in single-legged knockout phases, with the semi-finals and the final played on neutral ground.

== Schedule ==
The schedule of the competition was as follows:

Round	Draw date	Dates
Preliminary stage	2 August 2024	10–18 August 2024
Round of 32	21 August 2024	11 September – 10 October 2024
Round of 16	21 August 2024	8–25 October 2024
Quarter-finals	21 August 2024	29–31 October 2024
Semi-finals	21 August 2024	22 November 2024
Finals	21 August 2024	6 December 2024

== Qualified teams ==
Although 32 clubs would take part in the proper Copa Uruguay competition for this season, a total of 58 clubs were slated to enter the competition: 10 from Primera División, 6 from Segunda División, 4 from Primera División Amateur, and 2 from Divisional D, which were chosen based on their performance at halfway point in their respective seasons. The remaining 36 clubs were the ones participating in the Copa Nacional de Clubes organized by the Organización del Fútbol del Interior (OFI), which were trimmed down to 10 after a preliminary stage.

On 4 September 2024, 11 of the 16 Primera División clubs voted to request to the Uruguayan Football Association (AUF) the immediate suspension of the competition, in protest of the format changes implemented for this season. Five days later, seven clubs (Cerro, Cerro Largo, Danubio, Defensor Sporting, Montevideo Wanderers, Peñarol, and Progreso) sent a letter announcing their unwillingness to play the competition, with the AUF confirming the elimination of Peñarol, Danubio, and Cerro the following day. Although Defensor Sporting was among the clubs that signed the letter, they later backtracked and confirmed that they would take part in the competition.

Primera División; The top 10 teams of the 2024 season's aggregate table after the Torneo Intermedio	Segunda División; The top 6 teams of the 2024 season at halfway point	Primera División Amateur; The top 4 teams of the 2024 season's aggregate table after the Torneo Intermedio	Divisional D The runner-up and third-placed team of the 2023 season	OFI; 36 Serie A teams of the 2024 season
Boston River; ~~Cerro~~; ~~Cerro Largo~~; ~~Danubio~~; Defensor Sporting; ~~Montevideo Wanderers~~; Nacional; ~~Peñarol~~; ~~Progreso~~; Racing	Albion; Juventud; Montevideo City Torque; Oriental; Plaza Colonia; Uruguay Montevideo	Deportivo Colonia; Durazno; Frontera Rivera; Villa Española	Paso de la Arena; Rincón	18 de Julio; Arsenal; Atlético Bella Vista; Atlético Florida; Barrio Olímpico; Berlín; Boca (Melo); Boquita; Bristol; Campana; Central; Darling; Estudiantes; Estudiantil; Ferro Carril; Ferrocarrilero; Huracán (Minas); Huracán (Paysandú); Ituzaingó; Juanicó; Juventud Unida; Laureles; Lavalleja (Minas); Lavalleja (Rocha); Libertad; Litoral; Melo Wanderers; Peñarol (Rivera); Pirata Juniors; Piriápolis; Porongos; Río Negro; San Carlos; Santa Emilia; Sportivo Barracas; Universitario

== Preliminary stage ==
In the preliminary stage, the 35 participating clubs were split in four geographical zones (North, South, East, and Litoral), with one team from the South and East zones playing an interzonal match in the second round.

=== First round ===
==== North Zone ====
Team 1	Score	Team 2
Arsenal	1–1 (1–3 p)	Litoral
Peñarol (Rivera)	3–3 (8–7 p)	Pirata Juniors
Estudiantes	1–2	Ferro Carril

==== Litoral Zone ====
Team 1	Score	Team 2
Estudiantil	1–3	Bristol
Berlín	0–2	Santa Emilia
Laureles	3–0	Huracán (Paysandú)
Atlético Bella Vista	2–2 (8–7 p)	Sportivo Barracas

==== South Zone ====
Team 1	Score	Team 2
Porongos	3–1	Juventud Unida
Ferrocarrilero	0–3	Campana
Atlético Florida	1–2	Juanicó
Boquita	1–2	Río Negro
Central	1–3	Darling

==== East Zone ====
Team 1	Score	Team 2
San Carlos	2–1	Boca (Melo)
Melo Wanderers	1–1 (5–4 p)	Libertad
Barrio Olímpico	1–2	Lavalleja (Rocha)
Huracán (Treinta y Tres)	1–1 (5–3 p)	Lavalleja (Minas)
Piriápolis	2–0	Ituzaingó

=== Second round ===
==== North Zone ====
Team 1	Score	Team 2
Universitario	2–3	Litoral
Ferro Carril	1–1 (4–1 p)	Peñarol (Rivera)

==== Litoral Zone ====
Team 1	Score	Team 2
Bristol	1–1 (5–4 p)	Santa Emilia
Laureles	0–0 (4–5 p)	Atlético Bella Vista

==== South Zone ====
Team 1	Score	Team 2
Juanicó	2–0	Campana
Río Negro	4–0	Porongos

==== East Zone ====
Team 1	Score	Team 2
Melo Wanderers	2–2 (7–6 p)	Lavalleja (Rocha)
Huracán (Treinta y Tres)	2–4	San Carlos

==== South – East Interzonal ====
Team 1	Score	Team 2
Darling	1–1 (2–3 p)	Piriápolis

== Bracket ==
Round of 32
Frontera Rivera	1
Nacional	5
Durazno	2
Uruguay Montevideo	1
Litoral	1
Plaza Colonia	3
Piriápolis (w/o)	—
Peñarol	—
Paso de la Arena	0
Montevideo City Torque	2
Río Negro (w/o)	—
Danubio	—
18 de Julio (w/o)	—
Cerro	—
Rincón (w/o)	—
Progreso	—
Deportivo Colonia	1 (4)
Juventud (p)	1 (5)
San Carlos	0
Albion	2
Villa Española (w/o)	—
Montevideo Wanderers	—
Juanicó	0
Boston River	2
Atlético Bella Vista	0
Defensor Sporting	3
Bristol	1 (3)
Racing (p)	1 (4)
Ferro Carril	2
Oriental	1
Melo Wanderers (w/o)	—
Cerro Largo	—

Round of 16
Nacional	4
Durazno	0
Plaza Colonia	1
Piriápolis	0
Montevideo City Torque	5
Río Negro	1
18 de Julio	3
Rincón	2
Juventud	0
Albion	2
Villa Española	0
Boston River	2
Defensor Sporting	1
Racing	0
Ferro Carril (p)	1 (4)
Melo Wanderers	1 (3)

Quarter-finals
Nacional	4
Plaza Colonia	0
Montevideo City Torque	4
18 de Julio	0
Albion	0
Boston River	2
Defensor Sporting	6
Ferro Carril	0

Semi-finals
Nacional	4
Montevideo City Torque	0
Boston River	0
Defensor Sporting	1

Final
Nacional	2 (1)
Defensor Sporting (p)	2 (3)

== Round of 32 ==
11 September 2024	Piriápolis	w/o	Peñarol	Maldonado
20:00 UTC−3				Stadium: Domingo Burgueño Miguel
Note: On 10 September 2024, the AUF declared the advancement of Piriápolis to the next round due to Peñarol's withdrawal from the competition.

11 September 2024	18 de Julio	w/o	Cerro	Fray Bentos
20:30 UTC−3				Stadium: Parque Liebig's
Note: On 10 September 2024, the AUF declared the advancement of 18 de Julio to the next round due to Cerro's withdrawal from the competition.

11 September 2024	Río Negro	w/o	Danubio	San José de Mayo
20:30 UTC−3				Stadium: Casto Martínez Laguarda
Note: On 10 September 2024, the AUF declared the advancement of Río Negro to the next round due to Danubio's withdrawal from the competition.

12 September 2024	Paso de la Arena	0–2	Montevideo City Torque	Montevideo
20:30 UTC−3		Report	Núñez 55'; Obregón 70'	Stadium: Complejo Rentistas; Referee: Kevin Fontes

17 September 2024	Durazno	2–1	Uruguay Montevideo	Montevideo
11:00 UTC−3	Motta 11'; Rodríguez 68'	Report	Cruz 86'	Stadium: José Pedro Damiani; Referee: Andrés Martínez

18 September 2024	San Carlos	0–2	Albion	Maldonado
20:00 UTC−3		Report	Ribas 29'; Parada 69'	Stadium: Domingo Burgueño Miguel; Referee: Juan Cianni

18 September 2024	Melo Wanderers	w/o	Cerro Largo	Melo
20:00 UTC−3				Stadium: Arquitecto Antonio Eleuterio Ubilla
Note: Melo Wanderers advanced to the next round due to Cerro Largo's withdrawal from the competition.

18 September 2024	Bristol	1–1 (3–4 p)	Racing	Mercedes
20:30 UTC−3	Pírez 10'	Report	Da Silva 17'	Stadium: Luis Köster; Referee: Rubén Umpiérrez

18 September 2024	Juanicó	0–2	Boston River	Juanicó
20:30 UTC−3		Report	Barcia 23'; Viera 43'	Stadium: Gloria de un Pueblo; Referee: Pablo Silveira

18 September 2024	Rincón	w/o	Progreso	Montevideo
20:30 UTC−3				Stadium: Complejo Rentistas
Note: Rincón advanced to the next round due to Progreso's withdrawal from the competition.

25 September 2024	Villa Española	w/o	Montevideo Wanderers	Montevideo
15:00 UTC−3				Stadium: Obdulio Varela
Note: Villa Española advanced to the next round due to Montevideo Wanderers's withdrawal from the competition.

25 September 2024	Frontera Rivera	1–5	Nacional	Rivera
20:00 UTC−3	Fernández 21'	Report	G. González 42'; Castro 58'; Petit 61'; Mereles 68'; Herazo 80'	Stadium: Atilio Paiva Olivera; Referee: Santiago Motta

25 September 2024	Atlético Bella Vista	0–3	Defensor Sporting	Fray Bentos
21:30 UTC−3		Report	Cuello 54'; Ymbert 61'; Luan Brito 84'	Stadium: Parque Liebig's; Referee: Bruno Sacarelo

2 October 2024	Litoral	1–3	Plaza Colonia	Fray Bentos
20:30 UTC−3	Morales 90+2'	Report	Moreira 36'; Carrizo 73'; García 83'	Stadium: Parque Liebig's; Referee: Antonio García

9 October 2024	Ferro Carril	2–1	Oriental	Salto
20:00 UTC−3	Vera 14'; Lescano 40'	Report	Núñez 62'	Stadium: Ernesto Dickinson; Referee: Pablo Giménez

10 October 2024	Deportivo Colonia	1–1 (4–5 p)	Juventud	Colonia del Sacramento
20:00 UTC−3				Stadium: Profesor Alberto Suppici; Referee: Diego Dunajec

== Round of 16 ==
9 October 2024	Plaza Colonia	1–0	Piriápolis	Colonia del Sacramento
20:30 UTC−3	Moreira 90+4'	Report		Stadium: Juan Gaspar Prandi; Referee: Federico Modernell

10 October 2024	18 de Julio	3–2	Rincón	Fray Bentos
20:30 UTC−3	Morales; Matonte; González	Report	Burgos; Fernández	Stadium: Parque Liebig's; Referee: Kevin Fontes

22 October 2024	Ferro Carril	1–1 (4–3 p)	Melo Wanderers	Salto
20:30 UTC−3	Blanco	Report	Machado	Stadium: Ernesto Dickinson; Referee: Pablo Giménez

23 October 2024	Juventud	0–2	Albion	Las Piedras
15:00 UTC−3		Report	Fernández; Cuello	Stadium: Parque Artigas; Referee: Federico Modernell

23 October 2024	Villa Española	0–2	Boston River	Montevideo
15:00 UTC−3		Report	Pérez 36', 85'	Stadium: Obdulio Varela; Referee: Esteban Guerra

24 October 2024	Defensor Sporting	1–0	Racing	Montevideo
16:00 UTC−3	Barco 29'	Report		Stadium: Luis Franzini; Referee: Leandro Lasso

24 October 2024	Nacional	4–0	Durazno	Montevideo
20:30 UTC−3	Sanabria 18', 63'; Rodríguez 26'; Petit 30'	Report		Stadium: Gran Parque Central; Referee: Kevin Fontes

25 October 2024	Montevideo City Torque	5–1	Río Negro	Montevideo
20:30 UTC−3	Pino 15', 90'; Obregón 24'; Siri 38'; Pizzichillo 75'	Report	Rodríguez 17'	Stadium: Parque Alfredo Víctor Viera; Referee: Pablo Silveira

== Quarter-finals ==
29 October 2024	Albion	0–2	Boston River	Montevideo
10:00 UTC−3		Report	Anello 27'; Chiappini 45+1'	Stadium: Abraham Paladino; Referee: Eduardo Varela

29 October 2024	Montevideo City Torque	4–0	18 de Julio	Montevideo
15:00 UTC−3	Altez 5'; Pereyra 20'; Viana 45+2', 88'	Report		Stadium: Parque Capurro; Referee: Andrés Martínez

29 October 2024	Nacional	4–0	Plaza Colonia	Montevideo
20:30 UTC−3	Velázquez 22'; Lozano 24'; Santander 36', 55'	Report		Stadium: Gran Parque Central; Referee: Antonio García

31 October 2024	Defensor Sporting	6–0	Ferro Carril	Montevideo
20:30 UTC−3	Cadenazzi 15', 40'; Barco 34'; Dudok 44'; Luan Brito 60'; Giampaoli 85'	Report		Stadium: Luis Franzini; Referee: Jonhatan Fuentes

== Semi-finals ==
22 November 2024	Boston River	0–1	Defensor Sporting	Montevideo
17:45 UTC−3		Report	Biscayzacú 90'	Stadium: Centenario; Referee: Santiago Motta

22 November 2024	Nacional	4–0	Montevideo City Torque	Montevideo
21:30 UTC−3	Herazo 21', 55'; Recoba 62'; Petit 90'	Report		Stadium: Centenario; Referee: Leandro Lasso

== Final ==
6 December 2024
20:30 UTC−3

Nacional	2–2	Defensor Sporting
Herazo 52'; López 71'	Report	Spinelli 49', 90+10' (pen.)
Penalties
Castro (penalty scored); Galeano (penalty missed); López (penalty missed); Bentancourt (penalty missed)	1–3	(penalty scored) Soria; (penalty missed) De los Santos; (penalty scored) Álvarez; (penalty scored) Biscayzacú

Estadio Centenario, Montevideo
Referee: Hernán Heras

== See also ==
- 2024 Uruguayan Primera División season
- 2024 Uruguayan Segunda División season
