= 2024 Uruguayan Segunda División season =

Segunda División Profesional
- Season: 2024
- Dates: 16 March – 12 December 2024
- Champions: Plaza Colonia (1st title)
- Promoted: Plaza Colonia; Montevideo City Torque; Juventud
- Relegated: Sud América; Cooper
- Matches: 233
- Goals: 493 (2.12 per match)
- Biggest home win: La Luz 6–0 Cerrito (31 May)
- Biggest away win: City Torque 0–5 Rentistas (16 November)
- Highest scoring: Juventud 4–2 Oriental (30 March); Cooper 3–3 Plaza Colonia (12 April); La Luz 6–0 Cerrito (31 May); Sud América 3–3 Plaza Colonia (30 September); Colón 4–2 Tacuarembó (13 October); Cooper 4–2 City Torque (10 November)

The 2024 Uruguayan Segunda División season was the 117th season of the Uruguayan Segunda División, the second division championship of football in Uruguay. The season, named "100 Años del Club Oriental", started on 16 March and ended on 12 December 2024. A total of 14 teams competed in the season; the top two teams and the winner of the promotion play-offs were promoted to the Uruguayan Primera División. The fixture draw for the season was held on 2 March 2024.

Plaza Colonia were the champions, winning their first Segunda División title as well as promotion to Primera División after defeating Oriental by a 2–1 score on 16 November, the final day of the regular season. The second promoted team was Montevideo City Torque, who defeated Uruguay Montevideo in a tiebreaker series for the last direct promotion spot. The last promoted team was Juventud, who won the promotion play-offs after beating Uruguay Montevideo in the finals.

== Teams ==
Locations of the 2024 season teams outside Montevideo.
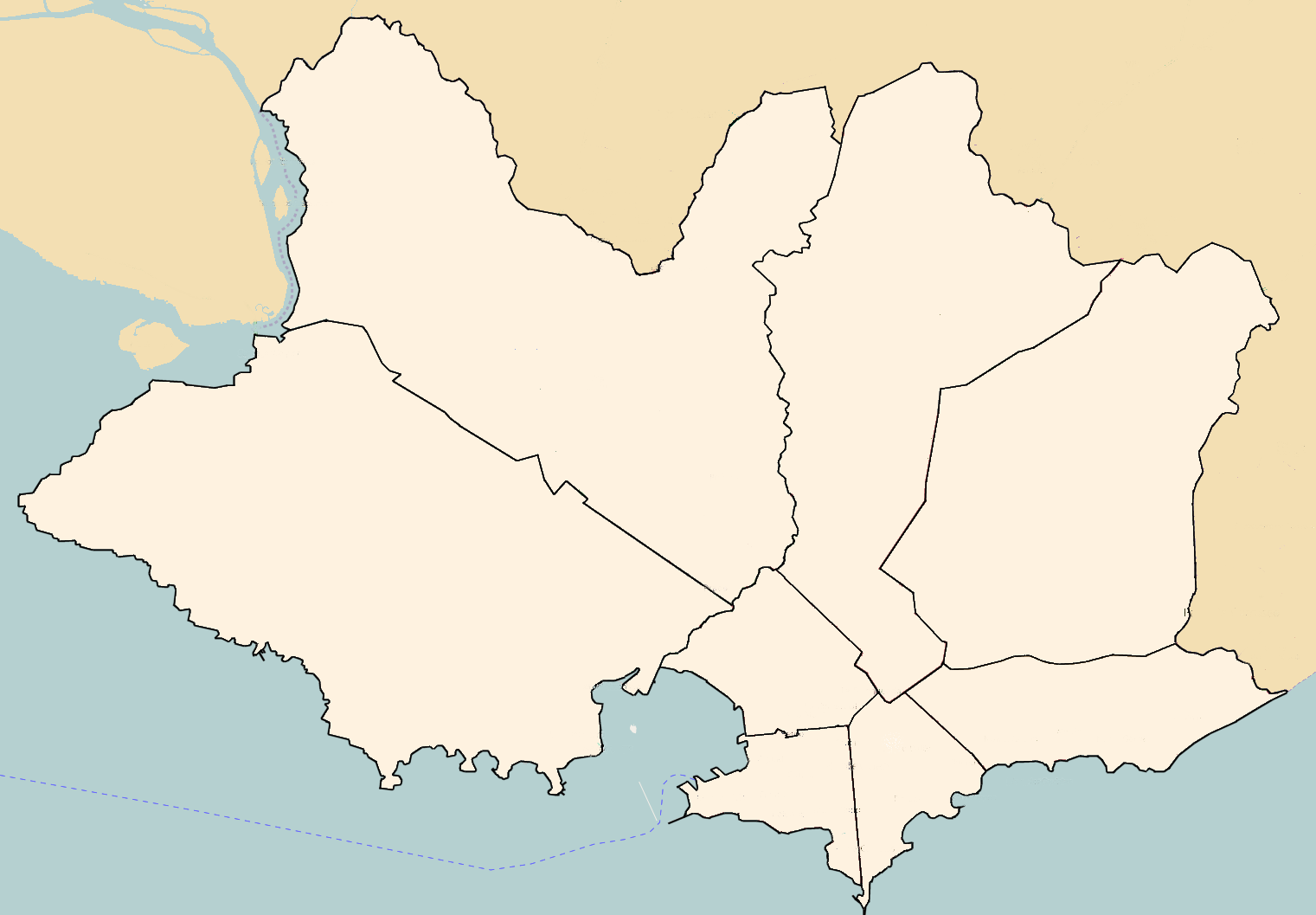
Locations of the 2024 Segunda División teams within Montevideo.

Fourteen teams took part in the season, nine of them returning from the previous edition. Montevideo City Torque, La Luz, and Plaza Colonia, relegated from Primera División, replaced the promoted sides Miramar Misiones, Progreso, and Rampla Juniors, while the 2023 Primera División Amateur champions Colón and runners-up Cooper replaced Bella Vista and Potencia, both relegated to the third tier in the previous season.

=== Club information ===
Club	City	Home stadium (Note: The stadiums owned by Colón, Oriental, Sud América, and Uruguay Montevideo do not meet the requirements to host league games. On the other hand, Albion, Cooper, La Luz, and Montevideo City Torque do not own a stadium.)	Capacity
Albion	Montevideo	Parque Palermo	6,500
Atenas	San Carlos	Atenas	6,000
Cerrito	Montevideo	Parque Maracaná	8,000
Colón	Montevideo	Parque Palermo	6,500
Cooper	Montevideo	Parque Palermo	6,500
Juventud	Las Piedras	Parque Artigas	12,000
La Luz	Montevideo	Parque Palermo	6,500
Montevideo City Torque	Montevideo	Parque Alfredo Víctor Viera	7,527
Oriental	La Paz	Parque Palermo	6,500
Plaza Colonia	Colonia del Sacramento	Juan Gaspar Prandi	3,500
Rentistas	Montevideo	Complejo Rentistas	10,600
Sud América	Montevideo	Parque Palermo	6,500
Tacuarembó	Tacuarembó	Raúl Goyenola	12,000
Uruguay Montevideo	Montevideo	Parque Palermo	6,500

== Torneo Competencia ==
The Torneo Competencia, named "Héctor Peri", was the first stage of the tournament. The 14 participating teams were divided into two groups of seven where they played each one of the teams in their group under a single round-robin format. The winners of each group advanced to the final, with the winner being assured of a berth into the promotion play-offs. Originally, the participating clubs had decided not to hold the Torneo Competencia in this season, however it was eventually reinstated after a vote prior to the start of the season.

=== Serie A ===
Pos	Team	Pld	W	D	L	GF	GA	GD	Pts	Qualification	JUV	ALB	TAC	ORI	URU	LLU	SUD
1	Juventud	6	4	1	1	10	6	+4	13	Advance to Final	—	—	0–2	4–2	—	—	2–0
2	Albion	6	3	2	1	7	3	+4	11		1–1	—	0–0	—	—	—	3–0
3	Tacuarembó	6	3	2	1	8	5	+3	11		—	—	—	2–2	1–3	1–0	—
4	Oriental	6	3	1	2	11	10	+1	10		—	2–0	—	—	3–2	0–1	—
5	Uruguay Montevideo	6	2	0	4	7	8	−1	6		1–2	0–1	—	—	—	—	1–0
6	La Luz	6	2	0	4	2	5	−3	6		0–1	0–2	—	—	1–0	—	—
7	Sud América	6	1	0	5	2	10	−8	3		—	—	0–2	1–2	—	1–0	—

Source: Soccerway
Legend: Blue = home team win; Yellow = draw; Red = away team win.
Rules for classification: 1) Points, 2) Goal difference, 3) Goals scored, 4) Head-to-head points, 5) Head-to-head goal difference, 6) Head-to-head goals scored.

=== Serie B ===
Pos	Team	Pld	W	D	L	GF	GA	GD	Pts	Qualification	MCT	REN	PCO	COL	CER	COO	ATE
1	Montevideo City Torque	6	4	2	0	9	2	+7	14	Advance to Final	—	—	—	3–0	0–0	2–1	—
2	Rentistas	6	3	1	2	4	3	+1	10		0–1	—	—	—	1–0	1–0	—
3	Plaza Colonia	6	2	2	2	7	8	−1	8		0–2	1–0	—	—	1–2	—	—
4	Colón	6	2	2	2	5	7	−2	8		—	1–1	0–1	—	—	—	2–1
5	Cerrito	6	1	4	1	4	4	0	7		—	—	—	1–1	—	1–1	0–0
6	Cooper	6	1	2	3	6	8	−2	5		—	—	3–3	0–1	—	—	1–0
7	Atenas	6	0	3	3	3	6	−3	3		1–1	0–1	1–1	—	—	—	—

Source: Soccerway
Legend: Blue = home team win; Yellow = draw; Red = away team win.
Rules for classification: 1) Points, 2) Goal difference, 3) Goals scored, 4) Head-to-head points, 5) Head-to-head goal difference, 6) Head-to-head goals scored.

=== Final ===
4 May 2024
18:00 UTC−3

Montevideo City Torque	2–0	Juventud
Villa 10'; Zeballos 65'	Report

Estadio Centenario, Montevideo
Referee: Santiago Motta

== Regular stage ==
In the regular stage, the 14 teams played each other twice under a double round-robin format for a total of 26 matches. Teams carried over their Torneo Competencia performances to this stage. The top two teams at the end of the regular stage were promoted to the Uruguayan Primera División, while the teams placing from third to sixth place advanced to the promotion play-offs.

=== Standings ===
Pos	Team	Pld	W	D	L	GF	GA	GD	Pts	Promotion or qualification
1	Plaza Colonia (C, P)	32	18	4	10	40	32	+8	58	Promotion to Primera División
2	Uruguay Montevideo	32	16	6	10	39	21	+18	54	Advance to Promotion tiebreaker series
3	Montevideo City Torque (P)	32	15	9	8	43	31	+12	54	Advance to Promotion tiebreaker series
4	Colón	32	14	10	8	42	27	+15	52	Advance to Promotion play-offs
5	Juventud	32	15	5	12	36	38	−2	50	Advance to Promotion play-offs
6	Cerrito	32	13	7	12	32	34	−2	46	Advance to Promotion play-offs
7	Rentistas	32	11	12	9	32	26	+6	45	
8	Oriental	32	12	8	12	39	41	−2	44	
9	Albion	32	11	11	10	32	32	0	44	
10	La Luz	32	9	8	15	28	33	−5	35	
11	Atenas	32	8	10	14	26	41	−15	34	
12	Cooper	32	7	12	13	27	35	−8	33	
13	Tacuarembó	32	8	8	16	28	39	−11	32	
14	Sud América	32	7	10	15	28	42	−14	31	

Source: Soccerway
Rules for classification: 1) Points, 2) Playoff series (if needed to decide promotion), 3) Goal difference, 4) Goals for, 5) Head-to-head points, 6) Head-to-head goals scored, 7) Playoff game, in case two teams are still tied for first place.
(C) Champions; (P) Promoted

==== Promotion tiebreaker series ====
Since Uruguay Montevideo and Montevideo City Torque ended up tied in points for second place, a two-legged tiebreaker was played to decide the second promoted team. The losing team advanced to the promotion play-offs.

19 November 2024
16:30 UTC−3

Montevideo City Torque	0–0	Uruguay Montevideo
	Report

Parque Alfredo Víctor Viera, Montevideo
Referee: Daniel Rodríguez

26 November 2024
16:30 UTC−3

Uruguay Montevideo	1–3 (a.e.t.)	Montevideo City Torque
Peraza 58'	Report	Catarozzi 53'; Pizzichillo 100'; Rodríguez 120+1'

Estadio Parque Capurro, Montevideo
Referee: Pablo Giménez

Montevideo City Torque won 4–1 on points.

=== Results ===
Home \ Away	ALB	ATE	CER	COL	COO	JUV	LLU	MCT	ORI	PCO	REN	SUD	TAC	URU
Albion	—	1–0	0–3	0–0	0–0	1–0	1–0	2–1	1–1	2–1	1–1	1–1	1–2	2–1
Atenas	2–1	—	1–0	0–0	1–1	1–3	1–1	1–0	3–1	1–3	2–0	1–0	1–0	1–1
Cerrito	1–0	4–1	—	0–2	0–0	2–1	0–0	2–2	3–1	0–1	0–2	0–2	3–1	0–2
Colón	3–0	1–1	0–2	—	1–0	3–0	4–0	1–1	0–1	2–1	1–2	2–2	4–2	0–0
Cooper	0–2	2–0	1–0	0–1	—	1–3	0–0	4–2	1–1	0–2	1–1	0–0	3–2	0–1
Juventud	0–0	1–0	1–2	2–1	0–3	—	2–1	1–3	1–1	0–1	1–1	1–0	2–0	0–1
La Luz	3–2	1–1	6–0	0–1	1–2	0–1	—	0–1	1–1	2–1	0–0	4–1	2–0	1–0
Montevideo City Torque	2–2	3–2	0–1	2–0	2–0	3–0	1–1	—	0–1	0–1	0–5	2–0	2–1	2–1
Oriental	1–1	5–0	2–1	0–4	1–0	3–0	1–0	0–2	—	1–2	0–2	1–2	2–1	0–2
Plaza Colonia	0–2	1–0	1–0	0–2	3–1	1–1	2–0	2–1	0–1	—	2–1	2–0	1–0	0–1
Rentistas	1–1	2–0	0–1	2–1	1–1	0–1	1–1	0–0	0–0	0–1	—	2–0	2–0	0–3
Sud América	2–1	0–1	0–1	1–1	2–0	1–0	3–0	1–1	1–1	3–3	1–1	—	0–2	1–2
Tacuarembó	1–0	2–0	0–2	1–1	0–0	1–2	0–1	0–0	1–0	0–1	1–1	2–2	—	0–0
Uruguay Montevideo	2–0	1–1	3–0	0–1	0–0	1–2	1–0	0–1	2–1	3–0	3–0	0–0	1–0	—

Source: Soccerway
Legend: Blue = home team win; Yellow = draw; Red = away team win.

== Promotion play-offs ==
=== Bracket ===
Semi-finals
Juventud	0	3	3
Colón	1	0	1
Cerrito	2	1	3
Uruguay Montevideo	2	3	5

Finals
Juventud	2	1	3
Uruguay Montevideo	0	1	1

=== Semi-finals ===
==== First leg ====
30 November 2024
09:30 UTC−3

Cerrito	2–2	Uruguay Montevideo
M. Fernández 28'; Mallet 61'	Report	Vargas 45+2', 48'

Estadio Parque Maracaná, Montevideo
Referee: Santiago Motta

29 November 2024
17:00 UTC−3

Juventud	0–1	Colón
	Report	Siri 53'

Estadio Parque Artigas, Las Piedras
Referee: Leandro Lasso

==== Second leg ====
4 December 2024
17:00 UTC−3

Uruguay Montevideo	3–1	Cerrito
Pinheiro 35' (o.g.); Peraza 51'; Sena 87'	Report	Batista 61'

Estadio Parque Capurro, Montevideo
Referee: Bruno Sacarelo

Uruguay Montevideo won 5–3 on aggregate.

4 December 2024
19:30 UTC−3

Colón	0–3	Juventud
	Report	Gauthier 11'; Peralta 57'; Mimbacas 86'

Parque Palermo, Montevideo
Referee: Antonio García

Juventud won 3–1 on aggregate.

=== Finals ===
8 December 2024
17:00 UTC−3

Juventud	2–0	Uruguay Montevideo
Larregui 72'; Falconis 90+7'	Report

Estadio Parque Artigas, Las Piedras
Referee: Pablo Giménez

12 December 2024
16:45 UTC−3

Uruguay Montevideo	1–1	Juventud
Alaníz 48'	Report	Aires 70'

Estadio Parque Capurro, Montevideo
Referee: Daniel Rodríguez

Juventud won 3–1 on aggregate and promoted to the Uruguayan Primera División.

== Relegation ==
Pos	Team	2023 Pts	2024 Pts	Total Pts	Total Pld	Avg	Relegation
1	Plaza Colonia	—	58	58	32	1.813	
2	Uruguay Montevideo	56	54	110	64	1.719	
3	Montevideo City Torque	—	54	54	32	1.688	
4	Colón	—	52	52	32	1.625	
5	Juventud	51	50	101	64	1.578	
6	Rentistas	47	45	92	64	1.438	
7	Oriental	47	44	91	64	1.422	
8	Cerrito	41	46	87	64	1.359	
9	Albion	41	44	85	64	1.328	
10	Atenas	40	34	74	64	1.156	
11	Tacuarembó	39	32	71	64	1.109	
12	La Luz	—	35	35	32	1.094	
13	Cooper (R)	—	33	33	32	1.031	Relegation to Primera División Amateur
14	Sud América (R)	26	31	57	64	0.891	Relegation to Primera División Amateur

== See also ==
- 2024 Uruguayan Primera División season
- 2024 Copa Uruguay
