= 2008–09 Campeonato Uruguayo Primera División =

106th season of the top-tier football league in Uruguay

Primera División
- Season: 2008–09
- Champions: Nacional (42nd title)
- Relegated: Bella Vista; Juventud; Villa Española
- Copa Libertadores: Nacional; Cerro; Racing
- Copa Sudamericana: River Plate; Liverpool
- Matches: 225
- Goals: 626 (2.78 per match)
- Top goalscorer: Joaquín Boghossian (16 goals)
- Biggest home win: Racing 4–0 Central Español (September 18, 2008); Danubio 4–0 Juventud (September 21, 2008); River Plate 5–1 Wanderers (March 21, 2009)
- Biggest away win: Tacuarembó 0–5 Cerro (February 28, 2009)
- Highest scoring: Bella Vista 5–2 Cerro Largo (November 9, 2008)

The 2008–09 Primera División season is the 77th professional season of Uruguay's top-flight football league.

== Teams ==
Team	Home city	Stadium
Bella Vista	Montevideo	Estadio José Nasazzi
Central Español	Montevideo	Parque Palermo
Cerro	Montevideo	Estadio Luis Tróccoli
Cerro Largo	Melo	Estadio Arquitecto Antonio Eleuterio Ubilla
Danubio	Montevideo	Jardines Del Hipódromo
Defensor Sporting	Montevideo	Estadio Luis Franzini
Juventud	Las Piedras	Estadio Martínez Monegal
Liverpool	Montevideo	Estadio Belvedere
Nacional	Montevideo	Estadio Gran Parque Central
Peñarol	Montevideo	Estadio Centenario
Racing Club	Montevideo	Estadio Osvaldo Roberto
Rampla Juniors	Montevideo	Estadio Olímpico
River Plate	Montevideo	Estadio Saroldi
Tacuarembó	Tacuarembó	Estadio Goyenola
Villa Española	Montevideo	Estadio Obdulio Varela
Wanderers	Montevideo	Estadio Viera

== Torneo Apertura ==
Pos	Team	Pld	W	D	L	GF	GA	GD	Pts	Qualification
1	Danubio	15	10	2	3	27	15	+12	32	Apertura tiebreaker
2	Nacional	15	10	2	3	23	13	+10	32	Apertura tiebreaker
3	Defensor Sporting	15	9	3	3	23	12	+11	30	
4	Racing	15	7	6	2	24	12	+12	27	
5	Liverpool	15	7	6	2	24	14	+10	27	
6	Peñarol	15	8	4	3	29	15	+14	25 (Note: Peñarol was docked three points.)	
7	Cerro	15	6	5	4	20	12	+8	23	
8	River Plate	15	5	5	5	17	17	0	20	
9	Central Español	15	5	5	5	17	21	−4	20	
10	Tacuarembó	15	5	2	8	15	20	−5	17	
11	Bella Vista	15	5	2	8	13	22	−9	17	
12	Montevideo Wanderers	15	4	2	9	17	18	−1	14	
13	Rampla Juniors	15	3	5	7	16	24	−8	14	
14	Villa Española	15	3	3	9	11	26	−15	12	
15	Cerro Largo	15	1	6	8	13	25	−12	9	
16	Juventud	15	2	2	11	9	26	−17	8	

Updated to match(es) played on February 7, 2009. Source: RSSSF
Rules for classification: 1) points; 2) goal difference; 3) number of goals scored.

=== Apertura tiebreaker ===
February 15, 2009

Danubio	1 – 2	Nacional
Rodríguez 36'	(report)	Fernández 60'; García 77'

Estadio Centenario, Montevideo
Attendance: 40,000
Referee: Jorge Larrionda

=== Top-ten goalscorers ===
Pos	Player	Team	Goals
1	(Uruguay) Emiliano Alfaro	Liverpool	7
1	(Uruguay) Sergio Leal	Danubio	7
3	(Uruguay) Sebastián Balsas	Racing	6
3	(Uruguay) William Ferreira	Defensor Sporting	6
3	(Uruguay) José María Franco	Peñarol	6
6	(Uruguay) Sebastián Charquero	Montevideo Wanderers	5
6	(Uruguay) Santiago García	Nacional	5
6	(Uruguay) Henry Giménez	River Plate	5
6	(Uruguay) Antonio Pacheco	Peñarol	5
6	(Uruguay) Mauro Vila	Defensor Sporting	5

Last Updated: February 9, 2009

== Torneo Clausura ==
Villa Española was relegated due to financial issues after the Apertura.

Pos	Team	Pld	W	D	L	GF	GA	GD	Pts	Qualification
1	Defensor Sporting	14	11	1	2	29	15	+14	34	Championship Playoffs
2	River Plate	14	9	3	2	32	17	+15	30	
3	Cerro	14	9	2	3	30	13	+17	29	
4	Liverpool	14	7	4	3	23	17	+6	25	
5	Peñarol	14	7	2	5	22	15	+7	23	
6	Nacional	14	6	5	3	27	21	+6	23	
7	Racing	14	6	5	3	22	17	+5	23	
8	Montevideo Wanderers	14	6	3	5	25	24	+1	21	
9	Cerro Largo	14	5	4	5	20	20	0	19	
10	Danubio	14	4	3	7	20	24	−4	15	
11	Central Español	14	3	3	8	16	24	−8	12	
12	Tacuarembó	14	2	6	6	16	25	−9	12	
13	Bella Vista	14	2	4	8	16	28	−12	10	
14	Juventud	14	2	2	10	15	34	−19	8	
15	Rampla Juniors	14	0	5	9	15	34	−19	5	

Updated to match(es) played on June 18, 2009. Source: RSSSF
Rules for classification: 1) points; 2) goal difference; 3) number of goals scored.

=== Top-ten goalscorers ===
Pos	Player	Team	Goals
1	(Uruguay) Jorge Zambrana	River Plate	10
2	(Uruguay) Joaquín Boghossian	Cerro	9
3	(Uruguay) Diego Ifrán	Danubio	8
3	(Uruguay) Gustavo Biscayzacú	Nacional	8
3	(Uruguay) Álvaro Navarro	Defensor Sporting	8
6	(Uruguay) Diego Cháves	Montevideo Wanderers	7
6	(Uruguay) Antonio Pacheco	Peñarol	7
6	(Uruguay) Liber Quiñones	Racing	7
6	(Uruguay) Leandro Rivero	Cerro Largo	7
10	(Uruguay) Diego de Souza	Defensor Sporting	6
10	(Uruguay) Paulo Pezzolano	Liverpool	6
10	(Uruguay) Mauren Franco	Tacuarembó	6
10	(Uruguay) Aldo Diaz	Bella Vista	6

Last Updated: June 18, 2009

== Results ==
Results tables includes scores from both the Apertura and Clausura tournaments.

Home \ Away	BVI	CES	CRR	CRL	DAN	DFS	JUV	LIV	NAC	PEÑ	RAC	RAM	RIV	TAC	VIL	WAN
Bella Vista		0–2	1–0	5–2	0–2	0–3	1–0	1–1	0–1	2–1	1–1	0–0	2–3	2–3		1–1
Central Español	2–0		0–2	1–1	2–2	0–1	3–0	1–5	1–2	0–0	1–3	2–2	1–2	2–1	1–1	0–4
Cerro	3–0	0–2		1–1	0–1	0–1	2–1	1–0	2–2	1–2	0–0	3–2	1–0	2–0		3–0
Cerro Largo	4–1	2–0	2–1		0–1	3–2	3–1	1–1	2–3	0–2	0–0	1–1	0–2	0–1	2–0	0–1
Danubio	1–0	1–1	1–3	1–1		1–0	4–0	2–3	1–0	2–1	1–3	2–0	3–0	2–0		2–1
Defensor Sporting	3–0	2–0	0–0	3–1	1–0		1–0	0–1	3–2	0–0	2–1	2–1	3–2	2–3		3–2
Juventud	0–3	1–3	1–1	1–1	1–5	1–2		3–1	0–1	0–3	0–2	2–0	0–3	1–1	1–3	0–2
Liverpool	3–3	2–1	1–2	2–0	2–2	0–0	1–0		1–1	2–1	0–2	2–2	2–1	2–0		2–1
Nacional	2–0	0–3	3–3	2–2	2–0	2–2	2–2	1–2		3–2	2–0	2–0	0–2	1–0	2–0	2–2
Peñarol	3–1	2–1	1–1	3–0	3–1	0–1	4–1	3–2	0–1		3–3	4–1	0–2	3–0	2–0	1–0
Racing	1–0	4–0	0–4	2–0	3–0	2–0	2–1	0–0	1–4	0–0		3–2	1–1	1–1		0–2
Rampla Juniors	1–1	0–0	0–3	2–2	1–0	1–4	1–4	1–1	1–3	3–2	0–2		2–1	3–1		1–1
River Plate	3–1	1–2	2–1	3–1	2–2	1–3	2–1	1–2	2–1	1–1	2–2	2–1		1–1	0–0	5–1
Tacuarembó	3–0	1–1	0–5	1–1	3–2	0–1	0–1	1–2	0–2	0–1	1–1	2–2	1–1		3–0	2–3
Villa Española	0–1		0–3		2–3	1–3		0–0			1–4	2–0				1–0
Montevideo Wanderers	1–2	3–0	1–2	1–0	4–2	2–4	3–0	0–1	0–1	1–2	2–2	3–2	0–0	0–1		

Updated to match(es) played on June 18, 2009. Source: RSSSF
Legend: Blue = home team win; Yellow = draw; Red = away team win.

== Aggregate table ==
Pos	Team	Pld	W	D	L	GF	GA	GD	Pts	Qualification
1	Defensor Sporting	29	20	4	5	52	27	+25	64	Championship Playoffs and the Liguilla Pre-Libertadores
2	Nacional	29	16	7	6	49	34	+15	55	Liguilla Pre-Libertadores
3	Cerro	29	15	7	7	50	25	+25	52	Liguilla Pre-Libertadores
4	Liverpool	29	14	10	5	44	32	+12	52	Liguilla Pre-Libertadores
5	River Plate	29	14	8	7	49	34	+15	50	Liguilla Pre-Libertadores
6	Racing	29	13	11	5	46	31	+15	50	Liguilla Pre-Libertadores
7	Peñarol	29	15	6	8	51	29	+22	48 (Note: Peñarol was docked three points in the Apertura.)	
8	Danubio	29	14	5	10	47	39	+8	47	
9	Montevideo Wanderers	29	10	5	14	42	42	0	35	
10	Central Español	29	8	8	13	33	45	−12	32	
11	Tacuarembó	29	7	8	14	31	45	−14	29	
12	Cerro Largo	29	6	10	13	33	45	−12	28	
13	Bella Vista	29	7	6	16	31	48	−17	27	
14	Rampla Juniors	29	3	10	16	33	60	−27	19	
15	Juventud	29	4	4	21	24	60	−36	16	
16	Villa Española	15	3	3	9	11	26	−15	12 (Note: Villa Española was relegated to Segunda División Amateur for financial reason after the Apertura tournament.)	

Updated to match(es) played on June 18, 2009. Source: RSSSF
Rules for classification: 1) points; 2) goal difference; 3) number of goals scored.

== Relegation table ==
Pos	Team	Pld	W	D	L	GF	GA	GD	Pts	Relegation
1	Defensor Sporting	59	41	7	11	119	64	+55	130	
2	River Plate	59	33	12	14	134	78	+56	111	
3	Nacional	59	32	14	13	102	67	+35	110	
4	Peñarol	59	31	12	16	112	68	+44	102 (Note: Peñarol was docked 3 points in the Apertura.)	
5	Racing	29	13	11	5	46	31	+15	100 (Note: Racing and Cerro Largo's points were double since this is their first season in the Primera División.)	
6	Liverpool	59	26	17	16	99	77	+22	95	
7	Danubio	59	27	12	20	105	86	+19	93	
8	Cerro	59	24	17	18	80	64	+16	89	
9	Montevideo Wanderers	59	23	10	26	86	93	−7	79	
10	Rampla Juniors	59	16	18	25	65	102	−37	66	
11	Central Español	59	17	13	29	71	97	−26	64	
12	Tacuarembó	59	16	15	28	64	95	−31	63	
13	Cerro Largo	29	6	10	13	33	45	−12	56	
14	Juventud	59	14	14	31	54	89	−35	56	Relegation to the Segunda División Profesional
15	Bella Vista	59	13	11	35	60	102	−42	50	Relegation to the Segunda División Profesional
16	Villa Española	15	3	3	9	11	26	−15	12 (Note: Villa Española was relegated after the Apertura due to financial reasons.)	Relegation to the Segunda División Amateur

Updated to match(es) played on June 14, 2009. Source: RSSSF
Rules for classification: 1) points; 2) goal difference; 3) number of goals scored.

== Championship playoffs ==
Semifinal					Final
					Aggregate table first place	Defensor Sporting	1	1
Apertura winners	Nacional	1	1	3		Nacional	2	2
Clausura winners	Defensor Sporting	1	1	0

=== Semifinals ===
==== First leg ====
June 21, 2009

Defensor Sporting	1 – 1	Nacional
de Souza 25'	Report	Lodeiro 22'

Estadio Centenario, Montevideo
Attendance: 15,000
Referee: Martín Vázquez

==== Second leg ====
July 5, 2009

Nacional	1 – 1	Defensor Sporting
Romero 23'	Report	Vera 44'

Estadio Centenario, Montevideo
Attendance: 17,000
Referee: Darío Ubriaco

==== Third leg ====
July 8, 2009

Defensor Sporting	0 – 3	Nacional
	Report	García 32' (pen.); Coates 74'; Fernández 77'

Estadio Centenario, Montevideo
Attendance: 18,000
Referee: Roberto Silvera

Nacional won 5–2 on points.

=== Finals ===
==== First leg ====
July 12, 2009

Defensor Sporting	1 – 2	Nacional
Pintos 66'	Report	Coates 78'; Biscayzacú 86'

Estadio Centenario, Montevideo
Attendance: 16,000
Referee: Martín Vázquez

==== Second leg ====
July 15, 2009

Nacional	2 – 1	Defensor Sporting
Victorino 27'; Lodeiro 86'	Report	Navarro 59'

Estadio Centenario, Montevideo
Attendance: 40,000
Referee: Jorge Larrionda

Nacional won 6–0 on points.

Primera División
2008–09 champion
Nacional
42nd title

Nacional qualified for 2010 Copa Libertadores Second Stage.

== Liguilla Pre-Libertadores ==
Pos	Team	Pld	W	D	L	GF	GA	GD	Pts	Qualification
1	Cerro	5	4	0	1	12	6	+6	12	2010 Copa Libertadores Second Stage
2	Racing	5	3	1	1	11	7	+4	10	2010 Copa Libertadores First Stage
3	River Plate	5	2	0	3	7	11	−4	6	2009 Copa Sudamericana First Stage
4	Liverpool	5	1	2	2	6	7	−1	5	Liguilla 4th place tiebreaker
5	Defensor Sporting	5	1	2	2	5	6	−1	5	Liguilla 4th place tiebreaker
6	Nacional	5	1	1	3	8	12	−4	4	

Updated to match(es) played on August 2, 2009. Source: RSSSF
Rules for classification: 1st points; 2nd goal difference; 3rd playoff (if needed)

Home \ Away	CRR	DFS	LIV	NAC	RAC	RIV
Cerro		2–0		3–1		3–2
Defensor Sporting			0–0		2–4	
Liverpool	0–3			2–3	1–1	3–0
Nacional		0–0			2–3	
Racing	3–1					
River Plate		0–3		4–2	1–0	

Updated to match(es) played on August 2, 2009. Source: RSSSF
Legend: Blue = home team win; Yellow = draw; Red = away team win.

=== Liguilla 4th place tiebreaker ===
Since Liverpool and Defensor Sporting tied on points and goal difference in the Liguilla, a playoff was needed to determine who earned the Uruguay 2 spot in the 2009 Copa Sudamericana First Stage.

August 8, 2009

Liverpool	1 – 0	Defensor Sporting
Correa 81'	Report

Jardines Del Hipódromo, Montevideo
Referee: Jorge Larrionda

=== Top goalscorers ===
Pos	Player	Team	Goals
1	(Uruguay) Joaquín Boghossian	Cerro	7
2	(Uruguay) Álvaro Navarro	Defensor Sporting	4
2	(Uruguay) Sebastián Balsas	Racing	4
4	(Uruguay) Sergio Blanco	Nacional	3
4	(Uruguay) Henry Giménez	River Plate	3
4	(Argentina) Pablo Hernández	Racing	3
7	(Uruguay) Bruno Montelongo	River Plate	2
7	(Uruguay) Claudio Dadomo	Cerro	2
7	(Argentina) Pablo Torres	Racing	2
7	(Uruguay) Santiago García	Nacional	2
7	(Uruguay) Emiliano Alfaro	Liverpool	2

Last Updated: August 2, 2009

== See also ==
- 2008–09 in Uruguayan football
