= Leandro Reymúndez =

Uruguayan footballer (born 1992)

Personal information
- Full name: Leandro Federico Reymúndez Martínez
- Date of birth: 1 February 1992 (age 34)
- Place of birth: Cardal, Uruguay
- Height: 1.73 m (5 ft 8 in)
- Position: Forward

Youth career
- Cerro
- 2010: Defensor Sporting

Senior career*
Years	Team	Apps	(Gls)
2011–2014	Cerro	9	(0)
2015–2016	Montevideo Wanderers	13	(2)
2016	→ Sud América (loan)	8	(0)
2016	Fénix	8	(1)
2017	Coquimbo Unido	24	(1)
2018	Cobreloa	5	(0)
2018	Deportivo Maldonado	4	(0)
2019	Villa Teresa	5	(0)
2019	Central Español	3	(0)
2020	Juventud Las Piedras	9	(1)
2021	Iberia	4	(1)
2021	Cerro	2	(1)
2022–2023	Cooper	27	(9)
2024	Atlético Florida	–	(–)
- * Club domestic league appearances and goals

Leandro Federico Reymúndez Martínez (born 1 February 1992) is a Uruguayan singer and former footballer who played as a forward.

== Career ==
A product of Cerro and Defensor Sporting, Reymúndez has developed his career in his homeland and Chile.

After playing for Iberia in Chile and Cerro in 2021, he announced his retirement from football on 1 February 2022. However, he returned to play for Cooper in the Uruguayan Divisional D in September of the same year.

In January 2023, Reymúndez tried to sign with Tacuarembó, but he finally continued with Cooper.

His last club was Atlético Florida in 2024.

== Post-retirement ==
Following his retirement, Reymúndez became a singer-songwriter under the stage name ReyMunDios. He composed a song in honor of Lionel Messi.
