= 2011–12 in Argentine football =

Football in Argentina
- Season: 2011–12

Men's football
- Primera División: Apertura: Boca Juniors (30th title); Clausura: Arsenal (1st title)
- Primera B Nacional: River Plate (1st title)
- Primera B Metropolitana: Sarmiento (3rd title)
- Torneo Argentino A: Douglas Haig (1st title)
- Copa Argentina: Boca Juniors (2nd title)

Women's football
- Campeonato de Fútbol Femenino: Apertura: Boca Juniors (20th title); Clausura: UAI Urquiza (1st title)

2011–12 season of Argentine football is the 121st season of competitive football in Argentina.

== Clubs national leagues ==
=== Men's ===
==== Primera División ====
- Apertura champion: Boca Juniors (30th title)
  - Top scorer: Rubén Ramírez (12 goals)
- Clausura champion: Arsenal (1st title)
  - Top scorer: Carlos Luna (12 goals)
- International qualifiers:
  - 2012 Copa Libertadores: Boca Juniors, Vélez Sársfield, Lanús, Godoy Cruz, Arsenal
  - 2013 Copa Libertadores: Arsenal
  - 2012 Copa Sudamericana: Independiente, Racing, Tigre, Argentinos Juniors, Colón
- Relegated: Banfield, Olimpo

Source: RSSSF

==== Primera B Nacional ====
- Champion: River Plate (1st title)
  - Top scorer: Gonzalo Castillejos (26 goals)
- Promoted: River Plate, Quilmes
- Relegated: Guillermo Brown, Chacarita Juniors, Desamparados, Atlanta

Source: RSSSF

==== Primera B Metropolitana ====
- Champion: Sarmiento (3rd title)
  - Top scorer: Ángel Vildozo (21 goals each)
- Promoted: Sarmiento, Nueva Chicago
- Relegated: General Lamadrid, Sportivo Italiano

Source: RSSSF

==== Torneo Argentino A ====
- Champion: Douglas Haig (1st title)
- Promoted: Douglas Haig, Crucero del Norte
- Relegated: Unión de Sunchales, Huracán de Tres Arroyos, C.A.I

Source: RSSSF

=== Women's ===
==== Campeonato de Fútbol Femenino ====
- Apertura champion: Boca Juniors (20th title)
- Clausura champion: UAI Urquiza (1st title)
- International qualifier:
  - 2012 Copa Libertadores Femenina: Boca Juniors

Source: RSSSF

== Clubs national cup ==
=== Men's ===
==== Copa Argentina ====
- Champion: Boca Juniors (2nd title)

Source: RSSSF

== Clubs international cups ==
=== Men's summary ===
| Team / Competition | 2011 Recopa Sudamericana | 2011 Copa Sudamericana | 2012 Copa Libertadores |
|---|---|---|---|
| Argentinos Juniors | did not qualify | Second stage | did not qualify |
| Arsenal | did not qualify | Quarterfinals | Second stage |
| Boca Juniors | did not qualify | did not qualify | Runner up |
| Estudiantes de La Plata | did not qualify | Second stage | did not qualify |
| Godoy Cruz | did not qualify | Round of 16 | Second stage |
| Independiente | Runner up | Round of 16 | did not qualify |
| Lanús | did not qualify | Second stage | Round of 16 |
| Vélez Sársfield | did not qualify | Semifinals | Quarterfinals |

==== Argentinos Juniors ====
2011 Copa Sudamericana

| September 1, 2011 Second stage | Argentinos Juniors (Argentina) | 0–0 | (Argentina) Vélez Sársfield | Estadio Diego Armando Maradona, Buenos Aires |
| 20:15 UTC−03:00 | | Report | | Referee: Diego Abal (Argentina) |

| September 8, 2011 Second stage | Vélez Sársfield (Argentina) | 4–0 | (Argentina) Argentinos Juniors | Estadio José Amalfitani, Buenos Aires |
| 19:15 UTC−03:00 | Franco 23'; Fernández 55'; Martínez 74' (pen.); Canteros 84' | Report | | Referee: Sergio Pezzotta (Argentina) |

Argentinos Juniors eliminated by points 4–1.

==== Arsenal ====
2011 Copa Sudamericana

| August 30, 2011 Second stage | Arsenal (Argentina) | 2–0 | (Argentina) Estudiantes | Estadio Julio Humberto Grondona, Sarandí |
| 21:15 UTC−03:00 | Leguizamón 49'; Burdisso 74' | Report | | Referee: Gabriel Favale (Argentina) |

| September 6, 2011 Second stage | Estudiantes (Argentina) | 1–0 | (Argentina) Arsenal | Estadio Ciudad de La Plata, La Plata |
| 21:15 UTC−03:00 | Sánchez 62' | Report | | Referee: Pablo Lunati (Argentina) |

| September 29, 2011 Round of 16 | Olimpia (Paraguay) | 0–0 | (Argentina) Arsenal | Estadio Defensores del Chaco, Asunción |
| 18:15 UTC−04:00 | | Report | | Referee: Paulo Oliveira (Brazil) |

| October 19, 2011 Round of 16 | Arsenal (Argentina) | 3–2 | (Paraguay) Olimpia | Estadio Julio Humberto Grondona, Sarandí |
| 18:10 UTC−03:00 | Trombetta 15'; Zelaya 19'; Blanco Leschuk 84' | Report | Zeballos 34', 42' | Referee: Darío Ubriaco (Uruguay) |

| November 3, 2011 Quarterfinals | Arsenal (Argentina) | 1–2 | Universidad de Chile | Estadio Julio Humberto Grondona, Sarandí |
| 19:30 UTC−03:00 | Obolo 46' | Report | E. Vargas 45'; Canales 81' (pen.) | Referee: Líber Prudente (Uruguay) |

| November 17, 2011 Quarterfinals | Universidad de Chile | 3–0 | (Argentina) Arsenal | Estadio Nacional Julio Martínez Prádanos, Santiago |
| 21:45 UTC−03:00 | E. Vargas 10'; Castro 45+1'; Canales 55' | Report | | Referee: Wilmar Roldán (Colombia) |

Arsenal eliminated by points 6–0.

2012 Copa Libertadores

| January 24, 2012 First Stage | Arsenal (Argentina) | 3–0 | (Peru) Sport Huancayo | Estadio Julio Humberto Grondona, Sarandí |
| 20:15 UTC−03:00 | Córdoba 21'; Zelaya 35'; Mosca 87' | Report | | Referee: Paulo Oliveira (Brazil) |

| January 31, 2012 First Stage | Sport Huancayo (Peru) | 1–1 | (Argentina) Arsenal | Estadio Huancayo, Huancayo |
| 20:30 UTC−05:00 | Ibarra 44' | Report | Leguizamón 85' | Referee: Martín Vázquez (Uruguay) |

| February 7, 2012 Second stage | Fluminense (Brazil) | 1–0 | (Argentina) Arsenal | Estádio Olímpico João Havelange (Engenhão), Rio de Janeiro |
| 22:00 UTC−02:00 | Fred 2' | Report | | Attendance: 28,928; Referee: Antonio Arias (Paraguay) |

| February 21, 2012 Second stage | Arsenal (Argentina) | 3–0 | (Venezuela) Zamora | Estadio Julio Humberto Grondona, Sarandí |
| 21:30 UTC−03:00 | Ortíz 1'; Carbonero 15'; Leguizamón 43' | Report | | Referee: Enrique Osses (Chile) |

| March 14, 2012 Second stage | Arsenal (Argentina) | 1–2 | (Argentina) Boca Juniors | Estadio Julio Humberto Grondona, Sarandí |
| 19:45 UTC−03:00 | C. Rodríguez 9' (o.g.) | Report | Mouche 28'; Ledesma 67' | Referee: Pablo Lunati (Argentina) |

| March 29, 2012 Second stage | Boca Juniors (Argentina) | 2–0 | (Argentina) Arsenal | Estadio Alberto J. Armando (La Bombonera), Buenos Aires |
| 19:45 UTC−03:00 | Ledesma 49'; Sánchez Miño 88' | Report | | Referee: Patricio Loustau (Argentina) |

| April 10, 2012 Second stage | Zamora (Venezuela) | 0–1 | (Argentina) Arsenal | Estadio Agustín Tovar, Barinas |
| 19:15 UTC−04:30 | | Report | Caffa 29' (pen.) | Referee: Julio Quintana (Paraguay) |

| April 18, 2012 Second stage | Arsenal (Argentina) | 1–2 | (Brazil) Fluminense | Estadio Julio Humberto Grondona, Sarandí |
| 19:30 UTC−03:00 | N. Aguirre 80' | Report | Carlinhos 34'; Rafael Moura 90+2' | Attendance: 5,000; Referee: Roberto Silvera (Uruguay) |

Arsenal eliminated by finishing in 3rd place in their group.

==== Boca Juniors ====
2012 Copa Libertadores

| February 14, 2012 Second stage | Zamora (Venezuela) | 0–0 | (Argentina) Boca Juniors | Estadio Agustín Tovar, Barinas |
| 19:45 UTC−04:30 | | Report | | Referee: José Buitrago (Colombia) |

| March 7, 2012 Second stage | Boca Juniors (Argentina) | 1–2 | (Brazil) Fluminense | Estadio Alberto J. Armando (La Bombonera), Buenos Aires |
| 22:00 UTC−03:00 | Somoza 46' | Report | Fred 9'; Deco 54' | Attendance: 47,769; Referee: Carlos Amarilla (Paraguay) |

| March 14, 2012 Second stage | Arsenal (Argentina) | 1–2 | (Argentina) Boca Juniors | Estadio Julio Humberto Grondona, Sarandí |
| 19:45 UTC−03:00 | C. Rodríguez 9' (o.g.) | Report | Mouche 28'; Ledesma 67' | Referee: Pablo Lunati (Argentina) |

| March 29, 2012 Second stage | Boca Juniors (Argentina) | 2–0 | (Argentina) Arsenal | Estadio Alberto J. Armando (La Bombonera), Buenos Aires |
| 19:45 UTC−03:00 | Ledesma 49'; Sánchez Miño 88' | Report | | Referee: Patricio Loustau (Argentina) |

| April 11, 2012 Second stage | Fluminense (Brazil) | 0–2 | (Argentina) Boca Juniors | Estádio Olímpico João Havelange (Engenhão), Rio de Janeiro |
| 22:00 UTC−03:00 | | Report | Cvitanich 33'; Sánchez Miño 74' | Attendance: 36,263; Referee: Darío Ubriaco (Uruguay) |

| April 18, 2012 Second stage | Boca Juniors (Argentina) | 2–0 | (Venezuela) Zamora | Estadio Alberto J. Armando (La Bombonera), Buenos Aires |
| 19:30 UTC−03:00 | Blandi 67'; Riquelme 74' | Report | | Referee: Raúl Orosco (Bolivia) |

| May 2, 2012 Round of 16 | Boca Juniors (Argentina) | 2–1 | (Chile) Unión Española | Estadio Alberto J. Armando (La Bombonera), Buenos Aires |
| 19:30 UTC−03:00 | Riquelme 24'; Silva 89' | Report | Jaime 72' | Referee: Víctor Hugo Carrillo (Peru) |

| May 9, 2012 Round of 16 | Unión Española (Chile) | 2–3 | (Argentina) Boca Juniors | Estadio Santa Laura-Universidad SEK, Santiago |
| 18:30 UTC−04:00 | Pineda 61'; Jaime 70' | Report | Insaurralde 25'; Mouche 49'; Riquelme 67' | Referee: Wilmar Roldán (Colombia) |

| May 17, 2012 Quarterfinals | Boca Juniors (Argentina) | 1–0 | (Brazil) Fluminense | Estadio Alberto J. Armando (La Bombonera), Buenos Aires |
| 19:45 UTC−03:00 | Mouche 51' | Report | | Attendance: 45.000; Referee: José Buitrago (Colombia) |

| May 23, 2012 Quarterfinals | Fluminense (Brazil) | 1–1 | (Argentina) Boca Juniors | Estádio Olímpico João Havelange (Engenhão), Rio de Janeiro |
| 19:30 UTC−03:00 | Thiago Carleto 16' | Report | Silva 90' | Attendance: 36.276; Referee: Enrique Osses (Chile) |

| June 14, 2012 Semifinals | Boca Juniors (Argentina) | 2–0 | Universidad de Chile | Estadio Alberto J. Armando (La Bombonera), Buenos Aires |
| 21:15 UTC−03:00 | Silva 15'; Sánchez Miño 55' | Report | | Attendance: 51.000; Referee: Wilmar Roldán (Colombia) |

| June 21, 2012 Semifinals | Universidad de Chile | 0–0 | (Argentina) Boca Juniors | Estadio Nacional Julio Martínez Prádanos, Santiago |
| 20:15 UTC−04:00 | | Report | | Referee: Darío Ubriaco (Uruguay) |

| June 27, 2012 Finals | Boca Juniors (Argentina) | 1–1 | (Brazil) Corinthians | Estadio Alberto J. Armando (La Bombonera), Buenos Aires |
| 21:50 UTC−03:00 | Roncaglia 72' | Report | Romarinho 84' | Referee: Enrique Osses (Chile) |

| July 4, 2012 Finals | Corinthians (Brazil) | 2–0 | (Argentina) Boca Juniors | Estádio Municipal Paulo Machado de Carvalho (Pacaembu), São Paulo |
| 21:50 UTC−03:00 | Emerson Sheik 53', 72' | Report | | Referee: Wilmar Roldán (Colombia) |

Boca Juniors eliminated by points 4–1.

==== Estudiantes ====
2011 Copa Sudamericana

| August 30, 2011 Second stage | Arsenal (Argentina) | 2–0 | (Argentina) Estudiantes | Estadio Julio Humberto Grondona, Sarandí |
| 21:15 UTC−03:00 | Leguizamón 49'; Burdisso 74' | Report | | Referee: Gabriel Favale (Argentina) |

| September 6, 2011 Second stage | Estudiantes (Argentina) | 1–0 | (Argentina) Arsenal | Estadio Ciudad de La Plata, La Plata |
| 21:15 UTC−03:00 | Sánchez 62' | Report | | Referee: Pablo Lunati (Argentina) |

Estudiantes tied on points 3–3, eliminated by goal difference.

==== Godoy Cruz ====
2011 Copa Sudamericana

| August 31, 2011 Second stage | Lanús (Argentina) | 2–2 | (Argentina) Godoy Cruz | Estadio Ciudad de Lanús, Lanús |
| 21:15 UTC−03:00 | González 19'; Neira 90+1' | Report | Rojas 26'; Navarro 34' | Referee: Juan Pompei (Argentina) |

| September 7, 2011 Second stage | Godoy Cruz (Argentina) | 0–0 | (Argentina) Lanús | Estadio Malvinas Argentinas, Mendoza |
| 21:45 UTC−03:00 | | Report | | Referee: Néstor Pitana (Argentina) |

| September 29, 2011 Round of 16 | Godoy Cruz (Argentina) | 1–1 | (Peru) Universitario | Estadio Malvinas Argentinas, Mendoza |
| 21:30 UTC−03:00 | Cabrera 88' | Report | Ruidíaz 80' | Referee: Antonio Arias (Paraguay) |

| October 20, 2011 Round of 16 | Universitario (Peru) | 1–1 (3–2 p) | (Argentina) Godoy Cruz | Estadio Miguel Grau, Callao |
| 19:45 UTC−05:00 | Polo 84' | Report | Damonte 44' | Referee: Wilmar Roldán (Colombia) |
| | Penalties |
| | Galván (penalty scored); Morel (penalty missed); Vitti (penalty missed); Ruidíaz (penalty scored); Rabanal (penalty scored) | | (penalty scored) Caruso; (penalty scored) Curbelo; (penalty missed) Rojas; (penalty missed) Sánchez; (penalty missed) Damonte |

Godoy Cruz tied on points 2–2, eliminated by penalties.

2012 Copa Libertadores

| February 16, 2012 Second stage | Godoy Cruz (Argentina) | 1–0 | (Uruguay) Peñarol | Estadio Malvinas Argentinas, Mendoza |
| 21:30 UTC−03:00 | Villar 51' | Report | | Referee: Raúl Orosco (Bolivia) |

| February 22, 2012 Second stage | Universidad de Chile | 5–1 | (Argentina) Godoy Cruz | Estadio Santa Laura-Universidad SEK, Santiago |
| 19:45 UTC−03:00 | Fernándes 29', 45', 72'; Lorenzetti 34'; Henríquez 90' | Report | Sigali 53' | Referee: Wilson Seneme (Brazil) |

| March 8, 2012 Second stage | Godoy Cruz (Argentina) | 4–4 | (Colombia) Atlético Nacional | Estadio Malvinas Argentinas, Mendoza |
| 21:45 UTC−03:00 | Caruso 8', 68', 89'; R. Ramírez 33' | Report | Mosquera 13'; Sigali 29' (o.g.); Pabón 54', 69' | Referee: Leandro Vuaden (Brazil) |

| March 22, 2012 Second stage | Atlético Nacional (Colombia) | 2–2 | (Argentina) Godoy Cruz | Estadio Atanasio Girardot, Medellín |
| 20:00 UTC−05:00 | Mosquera 2', 61' (pen.) | Report | Curbelo 23'; Castillón 34' | Referee: Heber Lopes (Brazil) |

| April 4, 2012 Second stage | Godoy Cruz (Argentina) | 0–1 | Universidad de Chile | Estadio Malvinas Argentinas, Mendoza |
| 19:30 UTC−03:00 | | Report | Henríquez 45+2' | Referee: Carlos Amarilla (Paraguay) |

| April 19, 2012 Second stage | Peñarol (Uruguay) | 4–2 | (Argentina) Godoy Cruz | Estadio Centenario, Montevideo |
| 22:00 UTC−03:00 | Zambrana 37', 73'; Mora 50'; Pérez 61' | Report | N. Sánchez 12'; Sevillano 19' | Referee: Ricardo Marques (Brazil) |

Godoy Cruz eliminated by finishing in 3rd place in their group.

==== Independiente ====
2011 Recopa Sudamericana

| August 10, 2011 Finals | Independiente (Argentina) | 2–1 | (Brazil) Internacional | Estadio Libertadores de América, Avellaneda |
| 21:50 UTC−03:00 | M. Velázquez 41'; Pérez 72' | Report | Leandro Damião 36' | Attendance: 40,000; Referee: Wilmar Roldán (Colombia) |

| August 24, 2011 Finals | Internacional (Brazil) | 3–1 | (Argentina) Independiente | Porto Alegre |
| 21:50 UTC−03:00 | Leandro Damião 19', 24'; Kléber 82' (pen.) | Report | M. Velázquez 48' | Stadium: Estádio Beira-Rio; Attendance: 39,000; Referee: Jorge Larrionda (Uruguay) |

Independiente tied on points 3–3, eliminated by goal difference.

2011 Copa Sudamericana

| September 28, 2011 Round of 16 | LDU Quito (Ecuador) | 2–0 | (Argentina) Independiente | Estadio Casa Blanca, Quito |
| 17:15 UTC−05:00 | Ambrosi 42'; L. Bolaños 52' | Report | | Referee: Líber Prudente (Uruguay) |

| October 12, 2011 Round of 16 | Independiente (Argentina) | 1–0 | (Ecuador) LDU Quito | Estadio Libertadores de América, Avellaneda |
| 21:15 UTC−03:00 | Núñez 45' | Report | | Referee: José Buitrago (Colombia) |

Independiente tied on points 3–3, eliminated by goal difference.

==== Lanús ====
2011 Copa Sudamericana

| August 31, 2011 Second stage | Lanús (Argentina) | 2–2 | (Argentina) Godoy Cruz | Estadio Ciudad de Lanús, Lanús |
| 21:15 UTC−03:00 | González 19'; Neira 90+1' | Report | Rojas 26'; Navarro 34' | Referee: Juan Pompei (Argentina) |

| September 7, 2011 Second stage | Godoy Cruz (Argentina) | 0–0 | (Argentina) Lanús | Estadio Malvinas Argentinas, Mendoza |
| 21:45 UTC−03:00 | | Report | | Referee: Néstor Pitana (Argentina) |

Lanús tied on points 2–2, eliminated by away goals.

2012 Copa Libertadores

| February 15, 2012 Second stage | Lanús (Argentina) | 1–1 | (Brazil) Flamengo | Estadio Ciudad de Lanús, Lanús |
| 21:00 UTC−03:00 | Carranza 74' | Report | Léo Moura 45' | Attendance: 20,000; Referee: Roberto Silvera (Uruguay) |

| February 23, 2012 Second stage | Olimpia (Paraguay) | 2–1 | (Argentina) Lanús | Estadio Dr. Nicolás Léoz, Asunción |
| 19:30 UTC−03:00 | Marín 24'; Biancucchi 79' | Report | Araujo 71' | Referee: Darío Ubriaco (Uruguay) |

| March 13, 2012 Second stage | Lanús (Argentina) | 1–0 | (Ecuador) Emelec | Estadio Ciudad de Lanús, Lanús |
| 19:45 UTC−03:00 | Pavone 71' | Report | | Referee: Víctor Hugo Carrillo (Peru) |

| March 20, 2012 Second stage | Emelec (Ecuador) | 0–2 | (Argentina) Lanús | Estadio George Capwell, Guayaquil |
| 18:15 UTC−05:00 | | Report | Regueiro 5', 87' (pen.) | Referee: Enrique Osses (Chile) |

| April 3, 2012 Second stage | Lanús (Argentina) | 6–0 | (Paraguay) Olimpia | Estadio Ciudad de Lanús, Lanús |
| 19:45 UTC−03:00 | Pavone 13', 54'; Camonaresi 29'; Regueiro 70'; Valeri 77'; S. Romero 84' | Report | | Referee: Víctor Rivera (Peru) |

| April 12, 2012 Second stage | Flamengo (Brazil) | 3–0 | (Argentina) Lanús | Estádio Olímpico João Havelange (Engenhão), Rio de Janeiro |
| 19:30 UTC−03:00 | Welinton 17'; Deivid 41'; Luiz Antônio 49' | Report | | Attendance: 15,932; Referee: Wilmar Roldán (Colombia) |

| May 2, 2012 Round of 16 | Vasco da Gama (Brazil) | 2–1 | (Argentina) Lanús | Estádio São Januário, Rio de Janeiro |
| 21:50 UTC−03:00 | Alecsandro 25'; Diego Souza 42' | Report | Regueiro 62' | Referee: Roberto Silvera (Uruguay) |

| May 9, 2012 Round of 16 | Lanús (Argentina) | 2–1 (4–5 p) | (Brazil) Vasco da Gama | Estadio Ciudad de Lanús, Lanús |
| 22:00 UTC−03:00 | Pavone 60'; Gutiérrez 78' | Report | Nilton 18' | Referee: Carlos Amarilla (Paraguay) |
| | Penalties |
| | Regueiro (penalty scored); Romero (penalty missed); Velázquez (penalty scored); Camoranesi (penalty scored); Fritzler (penalty scored) | | (penalty scored) Felipe; (penalty scored) Juninho Pernambucano; (penalty scored) Carlos Alberto; (penalty scored) Renato Silva; (penalty scored) Alecsandro |

Lanús tied on points 3–3, eliminated by penalties.

==== Vélez Sársfield ====
2011 Copa Sudamericana

| September 1, 2011 Second stage | Argentinos Juniors (Argentina) | 0–0 | (Argentina) Vélez Sársfield | Estadio Diego Armando Maradona, Buenos Aires |
| 20:15 UTC−03:00 | | Report | | Referee: Diego Abal (Argentina) |

| September 8, 2011 Second stage | Vélez Sársfield (Argentina) | 4–0 | (Argentina) Argentinos Juniors | Estadio José Amalfitani, Buenos Aires |
| 19:15 UTC−03:00 | Franco 23'; Fernández 55'; Martínez 74' (pen.); Canteros 84' | Report | | Referee: Sergio Pezzotta (Argentina) |

| October 5, 2011 Round of 16 | Universidad Católica (Chile) | 0–2 | (Argentina) Vélez Sársfield | Estadio San Carlos de Apoquindo, Santiago |
| 19:15 UTC−03:00 | | Report | Franco 15'; Bella 41' | Referee: Darío Ubriaco (Uruguay) |

| October 20, 2011 Round of 16 | Vélez Sársfield (Argentina) | 1–1 | (Chile) Universidad Católica | Estadio José Amalfitani, Buenos Aires |
| 19:15 UTC−03:00 | Ortiz 76' | Report | Sepúlveda 29' | Referee: Antonio Arias (Paraguay) |

| November 1, 2011 Quarterfinals | Santa Fe (Colombia) | 1–1 | (Argentina) Vélez Sársfield | Estadio Nemesio Camacho "El Campín", Bogotá |
| 20:15 UTC−05:00 | Bedoya 24' | Report | D. Ramírez 76' | Referee: Wilson Seneme (Brazil) |

| November 10, 2011 Quarterfinals | Vélez Sársfield (Argentina) | 3–2 | (Colombia) Santa Fe | Estadio José Amalfitani, Buenos Aires |
| 21:15 UTC−03:00 | Franco 7', 19'; Martínez 90' (pen.) | Report | Copete 46'; Pérez 67' | Referee: Enrique Osses (Chile) |

| November 24, 2011 Semifinals | LDU Quito (Ecuador) | 2–0 | (Argentina) Vélez Sársfield | Estadio Casa Blanca, Quito |
| 19:15 UTC−05:00 | Barcos 48', 83' | Report | | Referee: Jorge Larrionda (Uruguay) |

| November 29, 2011 Semifinals | Vélez Sársfield (Argentina) | 0–1 | (Ecuador) LDU Quito | Estadio José Amalfitani, Buenos Aires |
| 21:15 UTC−03:00 | | Report | Barcos 48' | Referee: José Buitrago (Colombia) |

Vélez Sársfield eliminated by points 6–0.

2012 Copa Libertadores

| February 7, 2012 Second stage | Defensor Sporting (Uruguay) | 0–3 | (Argentina) Vélez Sársfield | Estadio Luis Franzini, Montevideo |
| 19:45 UTC−02:00 | | Report | D. Ramírez 41'; Obolo 81'; Domínguez 85' | Referee: Enrique Osses (Chile) |

| February 22, 2012 Second stage | Vélez Sársfield (Argentina) | 3–0 | (Mexico) Guadalajara | Estadio José Amalfitani, Buenos Aires |
| 22:00 UTC−03:00 | Obolo 67'; Insúa 81', 82' | Report | | Referee: Leandro Vuaden (Brazil) |

| March 7, 2012 Second stage | Deportivo Quito (Ecuador) | 3–0 | (Argentina) Vélez Sársfield | Estadio Olímpico Atahualpa, Quito |
| 17:45 UTC−05:00 | Alustiza 45+3' (pen.); F. Martínez 47'; Saritama 70' | Report | | Referee: José Buitrago (Colombia) |

| March 22, 2012 Second stage | Vélez Sársfield (Argentina) | 1–0 | (Ecuador) Deportivo Quito | Estadio José Amalfitani, Buenos Aires |
| 19:45 UTC−03:00 | J. Martínez 89' | Report | | Referee: Wilson Seneme (Brazil) |

| April 11, 2012 Second stage | Guadalajara (Mexico) | 0–2 | (Argentina) Vélez Sársfield | Estadio Omnilife, Zapopan |
| 17:45 UTC−05:00 | | Report | A. Fernández 69'; Pratto 89' | Referee: Henry Gambetta (Peru) |

| April 17, 2012 Second stage | Vélez Sársfield (Argentina) | 1–3 | (Uruguay) Defensor Sporting | Estadio José Amalfitani, Buenos Aires |
| 20:15 UTC−03:00 | Insúa 63' (pen.) | Report | Olivera 6'; D. Rodríguez 37'; Britos 46' | Referee: Sandro Ricci (Brazil) |

| May 1, 2012 Round of 16 | Atlético Nacional (Colombia) | 0–1 | (Argentina) Vélez Sársfield | Estadio Atanasio Girardot, Medellín |
| 19:15 UTC−05:00 | | Report | Bella 8' | Referee: Darío Ubriaco (Uruguay) |

| May 8, 2012 Round of 16 | Vélez Sársfield (Argentina) | 1–1 | (Colombia) Atlético Nacional | José Amalfitani Stadium, Buenos Aires |
| 20:00 UTC−03:00 | Fernández 52' | Report | Mosquera 69' | Referee: Julio Quintana (Paraguay) |

| May 17, 2012 Quarterfinals | Vélez Sársfield (Argentina) | 1–0 | (Brazil) Santos | José Amalfitani Stadium, Buenos Aires |
| 22:00 UTC−03:00 | Obolo 35' | Report | | Referee: Carlos Amarilla (Paraguay) |

| May 24, 2012 Quarterfinals | Santos (Brazil) | 1–0 (4–2 p) | (Argentina) Vélez Sársfield | Estádio Urbano Caldeira (Vila Belmiro), Santos |
| 20:00 UTC−03:00 | Alan Kardec 77' | Report | | Referee: Roberto Silvera (Uruguay) |
| | Penalties |
| | Alan Kardec (penalty scored); Ganso (penalty scored); Elano (penalty scored); Léo (penalty scored) | | (penalty scored) J. Martínez; (penalty missed) Canteros; (penalty missed) Papa; (penalty scored) Domínguez |

Vélez Sársfield tied on points 3–3, eliminated by penalties.

=== Women's summary ===
| Team / Competition | 2011 Copa Libertadores Femenina |
|---|---|
| Boca Juniors | First stage |

==== Boca Juniors ====
2011 Copa Libertadores Femenina

| 15 November 2011 First stage | Boca Juniors (Argentina) | 2–3 | (Colombia) Formas Íntimas | Estádio Martins Pereira, São José dos Campos |
| 18:00 UTC−02:00 | Santana 2'; Potassa 8' | Report | Andrade 33' (pen.); Rodallega 67'; Peñaloza 87' | Attendance: 500 |

| 18 November 2011 First stage | Boca Juniors (Argentina) | 0–1 | (Brazil) São José | Estádio Martins Pereira, São José dos Campos |
| 18:00 UTC−02:00 | | Report | Poliana 60' | Attendance: 3,000 |

| 21 November 2011 First stage | Boca Juniors (Argentina) | 4–2 | (Ecuador) LDU Quito | Estádio Martins Pereira, São José dos Campos |
| 18:00 UTC−02:00 | Ojeda 15', 21'; Potassa 47'; Brusca 72' | Report | Riera 65'; Moreira 90' |

Boca Juniors eliminated by finishing in 3rd place in their group.

== National teams ==
=== Men's ===
This section covers Argentina men's matches from August 1, 2011, to July 31, 2012.

==== Friendlies ====
| September 2, 2011 | Venezuela | 0 – 1 | Argentina | Kolkata, India |
| 19:00 UTC+5:30 | | Report | Otamendi 70' | Stadium: Salt Lake Stadium; Attendance: 94,000; Referee: Dinesh Nair (India) |

| September 6, 2011 | Argentina | 3 – 1 | Nigeria | Dhaka, Bangladesh |
| 19:00 UTC+06:00 | Higuaín 24'; Di María 26'; Elderson 66' (o.g.) | Report | Obasi 47' | Stadium: Bangabandhu National Stadium; Attendance: 20,000; Referee: Akbar Bakhshizadeh (Iran) |

| September 14, 2011 Superclásico de las Américas | Argentina | 0 – 0 | Brazil | Córdoba, Argentina |
| 21:50 UTC−03:00 | | Report | | Stadium: Estadio Mario Alberto Kempes; Referee: Enrique Osses (Chile) |

| September 28, 2011 Superclásico de las Américas | Brazil | 2 – 0 | Argentina | Belém, Brazil |
| 21:50 UTC−03:00 | Lucas 53'; Neymar 75' | | | Stadium: Estádio Olímpico do Pará (Mangueirão); Referee: Jorge Larrionda (Uruguay) |

| February 29, 2012 | Switzerland | 1 – 3 | Argentina | Bern, Switzerland |
| 20:30 UTC+01:00 | Shaqiri 49' | | Messi 20', 88', 90+3' (pen.) | Stadium: Stade de Suisse Wankdorf; Referee: Florian Meyer (Germany) |

| June 9, 2012 | Brazil | 3 – 4 | Argentina | New Jersey, United States |
| 21:00 UTC+01:00 | Rômulo 23'; Oscar 56'; Hulk 72' | | Messi 32', 34', 84'; Fernández 75' | Stadium: MetLife Stadium; Attendance: 81,000 |

==== 2014 World Cup qualifiers ====
| October 7, 2011 Round 1 | Argentina | 4 – 1 | Chile | Buenos Aires, Argentina |
| 20:10 UTC−03:00 | Higuaín 7', 51', 62'; Messi 25' | Report | M. Fernández 59' | Stadium: Estadio Monumental Antonio Vespucio Liberti; Attendance: 26,161; Referee: Wilmar Roldán (Colombia) |

| October 11, 2011 Round 2 | Venezuela | 1 – 0 | Argentina | Puerto La Cruz, Venezuela |
| 20:20 UTC−04:30 | Amorebieta 61' | Report | | Stadium: Estadio José Antonio Anzoátegui; Referee: Roberto Silvera (Uruguay) |

| November 11, 2011 Round 3 | Argentina | 1 – 1 | Bolivia | Buenos Aires, Argentina |
| 17:00 UTC−03:00 | Lavezzi 60' | Report | Moreno 55' | Stadium: Estadio Monumental Antonio Vespucio Liberti; Attendance: 27,592; Referee: Carlos Vera (Ecuador) |

| November 15, 2011 Round 4 | Colombia | 1 – 2 | Argentina | Barranquilla, Colombia |
| 16:00 UTC−05:00 | Pabón 45' | Report | Messi 61'; Agüero 84' | Stadium: Estadio Metropolitano Roberto Meléndez; Attendance: 49,600; Referee: Sálvio Fagundes (Brazil) |

| June 2, 2012 Round 5 | Argentina | 4 – 0 | Ecuador | Buenos Aires, Argentina |
| 19:30 UTC−03:00 | Agüero 20'; Higuaín 30'; Messi 32'; Di María 76' | Report | | Stadium: Estadio Monumental Antonio Vespucio Liberti; Referee: Víctor Rivera (Peru) |

=== Women's ===
This section covers Argentina women's matches from August 1, 2011, to July 31, 2012.

==== Friendlies ====
| September 7, 2011 | Chile | 3–0 | Argentina | Santiago, Chile |
| | Lara 1', 26'; Araya 45' | Report | | Stadium: Complejo Deportivo de la ANFP |

| September 21, 2011 | Argentina | 1–1 | Chile | Buenos Aires, Argentina |
| | | Report | Guerrero 43' | Stadium: Complejo Deportivo Ezeiza |

==== 2011 Pan American Games ====
| October 18, 2011 Preliminary round | Argentina | 0–2 | Brazil | Estadio Omnilife, Guadalajara |
| 17:00 | | Report | Guedes 27'; Daniele 37' | Attendance: 5,967; Referee: Lucila Venegas (Mexico) |

| October 20, 2011 Preliminary round | Canada | 1–0 | Argentina | Estadio Omnilife, Guadalajara |
| 10:00 | Julien 48' | Report | | Attendance: 4,204; Referee: Yesli Rivas (El Salvador) |

| October 22, 2011 Preliminary round | Costa Rica | 3–3 | Argentina | Estadio Omnilife, Guadalajara |
| 13:00 | Acosta 67'; Rodríguez 75'; Alvarado 82' | Report | Pereyra 5'; Vallejos 8'; Ugalde 16' (o.g.) | Attendance: 6,417; Referee: Shane de Silva (Trinidad and Tobago) |

Argentina eliminated by finishing in 4th place in their group.
