= Mauro Fernández =

Mauro Fernández may refer to:

- Mauro Fernández Acuña (1843–1905), Costa Rican politician and lawyer
- Mauro Fernández (footballer, born 1989), Argentine football forward
- Mauro Fernández (footballer, born 1997), Uruguayan football defender

== See also ==
- Mauro Fernandes (born 1953), Brazilian footballer and football manager
