= Club Social y Deportivo Cooper =

Uruguayan football club

C.S.D. Cooper
- Full name: Club Social y Deportivo Cooper
- Founded: 25 August 1937; 88 years ago
- Ground: Parque Palermo
- Capacity: 6,500
- Chairman: Gonzalo Guasca
- Manager: Jorge Calvi
- League: Segunda División
- 2023: 2nd, Segunda División Amateur (Promoted)

C.S.D. Cooper is a Uruguayan football club from the Carrasco neighborhood of Montevideo. The club was founded in 1937 and currently plays in the Segunda División, the second division of football in Uruguay.

== History ==
C.S.D Cooper was founded on 25 August 1937, but ceased football operations in 1980. The club re-established its football side in 2021 as a Sociedad Anónima Deportiva, joining the Divisional D. That year, the club signed a number of high-profile players including Mauro Vila and Jorge Zambrana en route to an undefeated season and the league championship. However, no promotion or relegation took place that season. In June 2022, the club faced Tacuarembó F.C. in the opening match of the 2022 Copa Uruguay, the first-ever match of the new tournament. The club won the Divisional D again the following season, defeating Club Atlético Lito 4–1 and earning promotion to the Primera División Amateur in 2023. In 2023, the club was runner-up in the third tier, behind only Colón. Cooper earned its second-straight promotion, reaching a professional level for the first time in its history, by qualifying for the Segunda División in 2024.

== Honours ==
- Divisional D (2)

Champions: 2021, 2022

- Segunda División Amateur

Runner-up: 2023
