= 2021 Uruguayan Liga Metropolitana Amateur season =

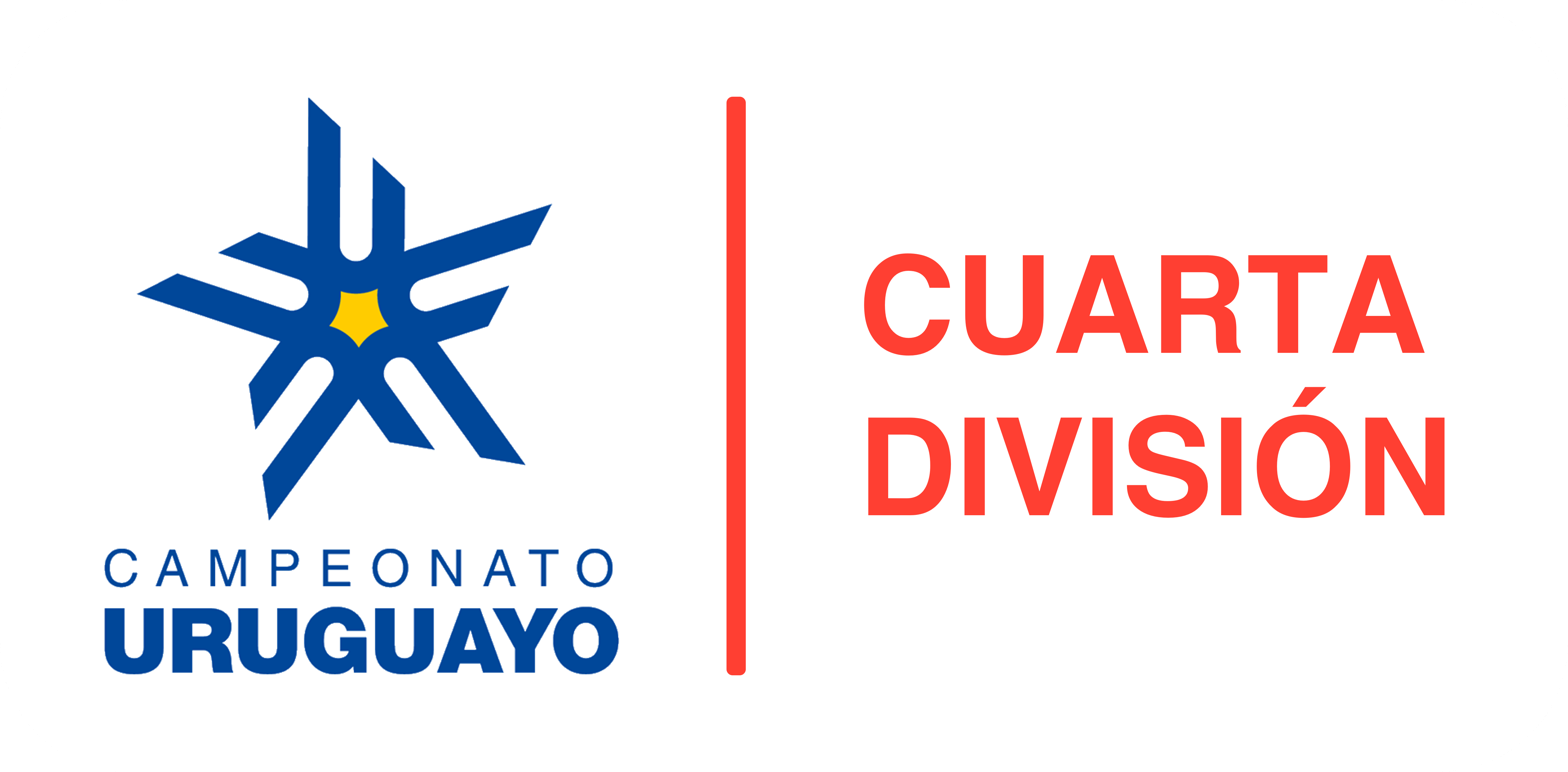
- Season: 2021
- Dates: December 3 - December 17
- Champions: C. S. y D. Cooper
- Matches: 25
- Goals: 29 (1.16 per match)
- Top goalscorer: Atilio Álvez, Ignacio Rodríguez
- Biggest home win: Rincón 5 - 2 Hacele un Gol a la Vida (Dec. 12)
- Biggest away win: Cooper 6 - 0 Hacele un Gol a la Vida (Dec. 03)
- Highest scoring: Rincón 5 - 2 Hacele un Gol a la Vida (Dec. 12)
- Longest unbeaten run: 4 - Cooper (Dec. 3 - Dec. 17)
- Longest winless run: 3 - Hacele un Gol a la Vida (Dec. 03 - Dec. 12)
- Longest losing run: 3 - Hacele un Gol a la Vida (Dec. 03 - Dec. 12)

The 2021 Uruguayan Liga Metropolitana Amateur season, officially known as the Campeonato Uruguayo 2021 de la Divisional D, was the inaugural season of the Uruguayan Liga Metropolitana Amateur, bringing back the tier to the Uruguayan football league system after 43 seasons without a fourth division. An experimental league, it began on December 3, 2021 and ended on December 17, 2021; lasting only two weeks.

Cooper ended up as champions after beating Paso de la Arena 4–0 to seal their first "Divisional D" and second historical fourth division title (they had previously won a Primera "D" title in 1976).

== Teams ==
As it was its inaugural season, all teams were newcomers to the league. Though most of these teams were founded or affiliated with the Uruguayan Football Association with the sole purpose of competing in the league, it marked the return of Cooper (and disputably Deutscher) to the Uruguayan football league.

The teams that participated in the league's first season were:

Team	Location	District	Foundation Date
C. A. Cinco Esquinas de Pando	Pando, Canelones		December 8, 1934
C. S. y D. Cooper	Montevideo	Carrasco	August 25, 1937
Deutscher Fussbal Klub	Montevideo		2021 (unknown)
C. S. y D. Keguay	Toledo, Canelones		August 25, 2000
C. S. y D. Hacele un Gol a la Vida	Montevideo		October 8, 2010
C. S. y D. Paso de la Arena	Montevideo	Paso de la Arena	September 1, 1949
Rincón de Carrasco B.F.C.	Ciudad de la Costa, Canelones		November 14, 2005
C. A. Unión de San José	Ciudad del Plata, San José		February 26, 2020

Special considerations:

1.C. S. y D. Hacele un Gol a la Vida is actually based on the city of Young, in the Río Negro department. However, and solely with the purpose of taking part in the league, the club has moved its administrative venues to the city of Montevideo.
2.Though it bears the same name, colours and crest of the original Deutscher F. K., the original club had briefly changed name to Centro Atlético Montevideo before being dissolved in 1909.

The teams were divided into two groups or Series (labeled "A" and "B") of four teams each, which were randomly sorted before the season began. Teams would only face teams within their same series in a single-round format, meaning that only three matches would be played within each group. Then, after all matches in both series had been played, a one-round final would be held between the teams topping their groups to determine the 2021 Uruguayan Liga Metropolitana Amateur champion.

== Standings ==
=== Serie A ===
The Serie A was named William "Tola" Ferreira and included C. S. y D. Paso de la Arena, C. A. Cinco Esquinas de Pando, Deutscher Fussball Klub and C. S. y D. Keguay:

Pos	Team	Pld	W	D	L	GF	GA	GD	Pts	Qualification or relegation
1	C. S. y D. Paso de la Arena	3	2	1	0	6	1	+5	7	Qualification for Championship Play-off and 2022 Copa Uruguay.
2	C. A. Cinco Esquinas de Pando	3	2	0	1	6	2	+4	6	Remains in the division.
3	Deutscher Fussbal Klub	3	1	0	2	2	6	−4	3	Remains in the division.
4	C. S. y D. Keguay	3	0	1	2	1	6	−5	1	Remains in the division.

Updated to match(es) played on unknown. Source: https://www.auf.org.uy/historico-temporadas/35/8/

=== Serie B ===
The Serie B was given the name of Luis "Gallego" Villar and included C. S. y D. Cooper, Rincón de Carrasco B. F. C., C. A. Unión de San José and C. S. y D. Hacele un Gol a la Vida:

Pos	Team	Pld	W	D	L	GF	GA	GD	Pts	Qualification or relegation
1	C. S. y D. Cooper	3	2	1	0	10	1	+9	7	Qualification for Championship Play-off and 2022 Copa Uruguay.
2	Rincón de Carrasco B. F. C.	3	2	1	0	8	5	+3	7	Remains in the division.
3	C. A. Unión de San José	3	1	0	2	6	5	+1	3	Remains in the division.
4	C. S. y D. Hacele un Gol a la Vida	3	0	0	3	2	15	−13	0	Remains in the division.

Updated to match(es) played on unknown. Source: https://www.auf.org.uy/historico-temporadas/35/8/

Footnote:

- C. A. Unión de San José fielded unregistered players, thus the entirety of the points of its 2–2 draw against Rincón de Carrasco B. F. C. were granted to the latter and the match counted as a win.

== Championship Playoff ==
Divisional D Championship Final
C. S. y D. Cooper	4
Rincón de Carrasco B. F. C.	0

Liga Metropolitana Amateur
2021 Champions
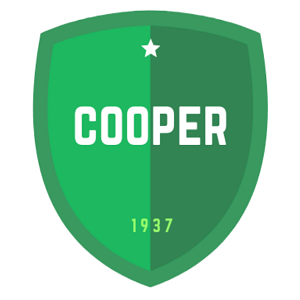

1st title

== See also ==
- Uruguayan football league system
- Uruguayan Liga Metropolitana Amateur
- Copa Uruguay
