= Deportivo LSM =

Uruguayan football team

- Full name: Deportivo LSM
- Founded: 27 May 2025; 16 months ago
- Owner(s): Luis Suárez; Lionel Messi
- Manager: Rafael Cánovas
- League: Primera Divisional C
- 2025: 1st (promoted)
Home colours	Away colours

Deportivo LSM is a Uruguayan football team which was launched in May 2025 by Uruguayan footballer Luis Suárez. His teammate and friend Lionel Messi is also taking part.

== Overview ==
Suárez had already established a sports complex in 2018, covering eight hectares and including a synthetic turf stadium with a capacity for 1,400 spectators, a 7-a-side football field for 620 people, three other natural turf fields and other facilities such as gymnasiums and swimming pools.

LSM was born as a continuation of that project, focused on offering children and young people a solid platform to grow in sports and in the human aspect. LSM will officially compete in the Uruguayan Football Association. Its technical director will be former player Álvaro Recoba.

LSM is headquartered in Ciudad de la Costa. Women's football has already started competitions.

== Crest, colours & kit ==
=== Kit manufacturers and shirt sponsors ===
Period	Kit manufacturer	Shirt sponsor	Back sponsor	Chest sponsor	Sleeve sponsor
2025	Puma	GAC Motor	–		
2026	Puma	GAC Motor	–		

== Managers ==
List of Deportivo LSM managers
Name	Nationality	From	To	Ref
Rafael Cánovas	Uruguay	7 June 2025	Present	

== Season by season record ==
Season	Division	League									Top Goalscorer	
Season	Division	P	W	D	L	F	A	GD	Pts	Pos	Name	Goals
2025	Primera Divisional D	13	10	1	2	35	6	+29	31	1st	–	–
2026	Primera Divisional C	8	5	2	1	11	5	+6	17	2nd	–	–

	Champions
	Runners-up
	Third Place
♦	Top scorer in league

== Honours ==
=== Trophies ===
- Divisional D
  - Champions (1): 2025
