= Uruguayan Liga Metropolitana Amateur =

Liga Metropolitana Amateur
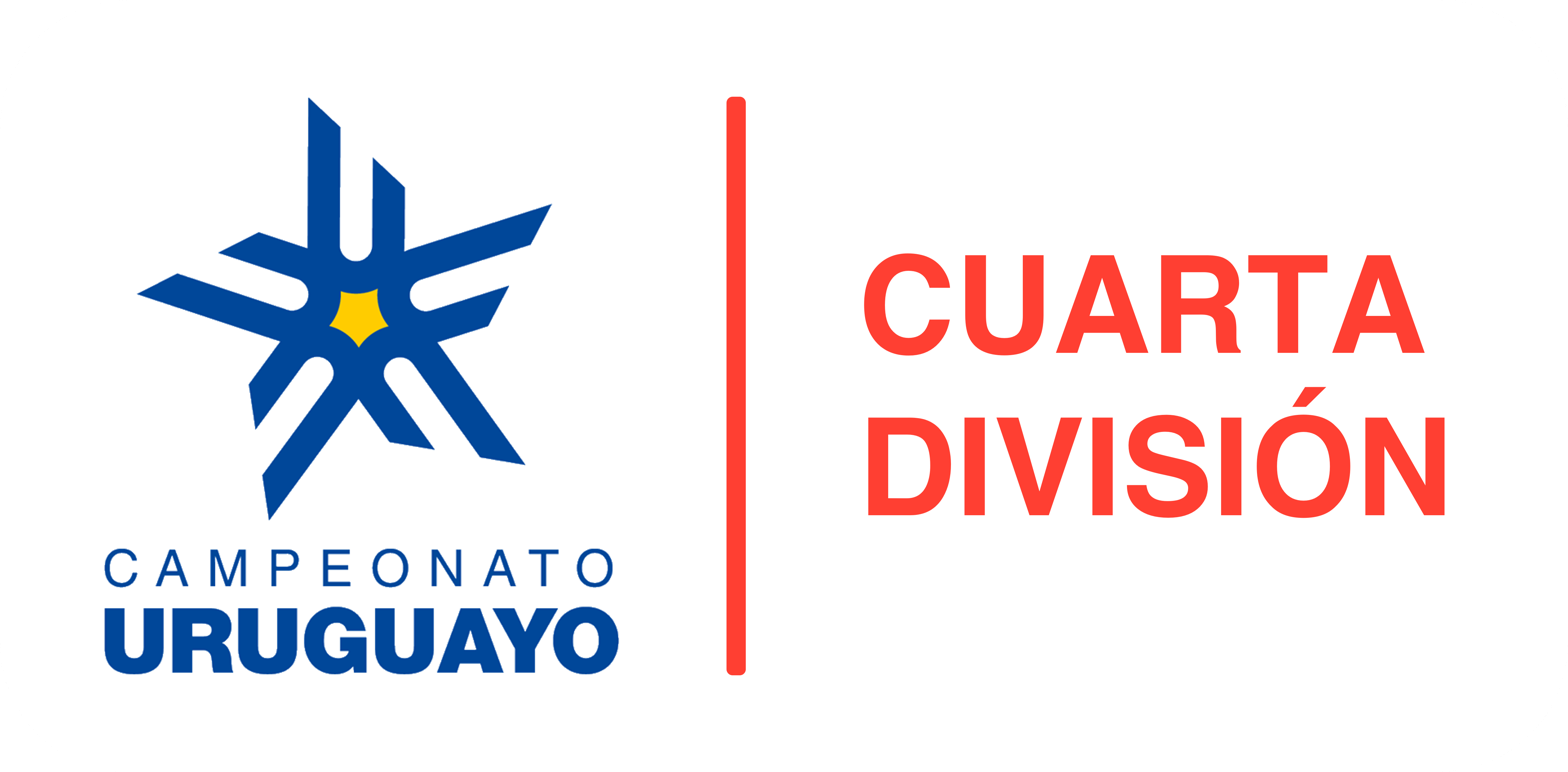
- Organising body: AUF
- Founded: 2021; 5 years ago
- Country: Uruguay
- Confederation: CONMEBOL
- Number of clubs: 14
- Level on pyramid: 4
- Promotion to: Primera División Amateur
- Relegation to: Team is deaffiliated.
- Domestic cup: Copa Uruguay (only the best 2 teams of the previous season)
- Current champions: Deportivo LSM (1st title)
- Most championships: Cooper (2 titles)
- Broadcaster(s): AUF TV (streaming)
- Website: AUF

The Uruguayan Liga Metropolitana Amateur (also denominated Divisional D) is the fourth division in the Uruguayan football league system. Historically occupied by the Divisional Extra first, then the Primera "D", the idea to refloat a fourth league in Uruguay's league pyramid was brought up by 2020, then led to fruition in 2021 by the Uruguayan Football Association.

== History ==
=== Inaugural season ===
The first edition of the league was drawn on 29 November 2021 and it didn't involve any promotion nor relegation.

Only teams based no further than 40 kilometres away from Montevideo (those in the Montevideo metropolitan area, thus the league's name) were allowed to participate in the league after also paying an entry fee of US$5000 and guaranteeing compliance of dispositions such as proven representativity of a community or neighbourhood and possession of a field, rented or own.

The teams that participated in the league's first season were:

Team	Location	District	Foundation Date
Cinco Esquinas de Pando	Pando, Canelones		December 8, 1934
Cooper	Montevideo	Carrasco	August 25, 1937
Deutscher	Montevideo		2021 (unknown)
Keguay	Toledo, Canelones		August 25, 2000
Hacele un Gol a la Vida	Montevideo		October 8, 2010
Paso de la Arena	Montevideo	Paso de la Arena	September 1, 1949
Rincón de Carrasco	Ciudad de la Costa, Canelones		November 14, 2005
Unión de San José	Ciudad del Plata, San José		February 26, 2020

Special considerations:

1.Hacele un Gol a la Vida is actually based on the city of Young, in the Río Negro department. However, and solely with the purpose of taking part in the league, the club has moved its administrative venues to the city of Montevideo.
2.Though it bears the same name, colours and crest of the original Deutscher, the original club had briefly changed name to Centro Atlético Montevideo before being dissolved in 1909.

The league was divided into two Series (A and B) of four teams, randomly sorted before the season began. Participants faced other teams from the same series in a single-round format. After all matches in both series were played, a one-round final was held between the two best performing teams in each group, which were Cooper and Paso de la Arena.

Cooper were crowned champions after a 4–0 victory over Paso de la Arena on December 17, 2021. Since no promotion system was yet implemented, they would have to play the following season in the same division another time; though them and Paso de la Arena would be granted two spots for the 2022 Copa Uruguay, being sorted into the Preliminary and First Round respectively.

=== League expansion and inclusion into the Uruguayan football league system ===
The league would welcome several new teams, those being Academia, Deportivo C.E.M., Estudiantes del Plata and Lito, though its format would not be altered. Additionally, a promotion spot to the Uruguayan Primera División Amateur would be implemented for the 2022 season, with it being won by title-holders Cooper after beating Lito, who had just returned to the league system, on penalties (3-4).

No relegation from the Primera División Amateur to the Primera "D" would be implemented yet, though; and the team who finished last in the league would be deaffiliated - that spot would go to Keguay, as though they beat Hacele a la Vida on a relegation playoff, the result would ultimately be invalidated due to them unproperly fielding unregistered players.

== Fourth division champions (historical) ==
Segunda División Amateur / Divisional D

Ed.	Season	Champion	Runner-up
1	2021	Cooper (1)	Paseo de la Arena
2	2022	Cooper (2)	Lito
3	2023	Lito (1)	Rincón
4	2024	Deutscher (1)	Paseo de la Arena
5	2025	Deportivo LSM (1)	Los Gorriones

== Titles by club ==
Club	Titles	Runners-up	Seasons won	Seasons runner-up
Cooper	2	—	2021, 2022	—
Lito	1	1	2023	2022
Deutscher	1	—	2024	—
Deportivo LSM	1	—	2025	—

== See also ==
- Uruguayan football league system
- Uruguayan Primera División
- Uruguayan Segunda División
- Uruguayan Primera División Amateur
