= Anthony Aires =

Uruguayan football player (born 2004)

Personal information
- Full name: Anthony Nahuel Aires Almeida
- Date of birth: 18 May 2004 (age 22)
- Place of birth: Las Piedras, Uruguay
- Height: 1.77 m (5 ft 10 in)
- Position: Midfielder

Team information
- Current team: Juventud
- Number: 26

Youth career
- La Paz Wanderers
- Liverpool Montevideo

Senior career*
Years	Team	Apps	(Gls)
2021–	Liverpool Montevideo	6	(0)
2024–	→ Juventud (loan)	19	(4)

International career
2019	Uruguay U15	23	(0)
- * Club domestic league appearances and goals as of 17 August 2024

Anthony Nahuel Aires Almeida (born 18 May 2004) is a Uruguayan footballer who plays as a midfielder for Juventud on loan from Liverpool Montevideo.

== Career ==
A youth academy graduate of Liverpool Montevideo, Aires made his professional debut for the club on 16 May 2021 in a 4–2 league win against Deportivo Maldonado.

Aires is a current Uruguayan youth international. He was part of Uruguay squad at 2019 South American U-15 Championship.

== Career statistics ==
=== Club ===
As of 8 August 2021

Appearances and goals by club, season and competition
Club	Season	League			Cup		Continental		Total	
Club	Season	Division	Apps	Goals	Apps	Goals	Apps	Goals	Apps	Goals
Liverpool Montevideo	2021	Uruguayan Primera División	3	0	—		0	0	3	0
Career total			3	0	0	0	0	0	3	0
