= Esteban Obregón =

Argentine footballer

Personal information
- Full name: Esteban Daniel Obregón
- Date of birth: 24 October 2001 (age 25)
- Place of birth: Ringuelet, Argentina
- Height: 1.77 m (5 ft 10 in)
- Position: Attacking midfielder

Team information
- Current team: Montevideo City Torque
- Number: 11

Youth career
- Estudiantes

Senior career*
Years	Team	Apps	(Gls)
2020–	Estudiantes	4	(0)
2022–2023	→ Guillermo Brown (loan)	29	(1)
2023	→ Nueva Chicago (loan)	35	(4)
2024–	Montevideo City Torque	58	(2)
- * Club domestic league appearances and goals as of 1 October 2025

Esteban Daniel Obregón (born 24 October 2001) is an Argentine professional footballer who plays as an attacking midfielder for Montevideo City Torque in Uruguay.

== Career ==
Obregón started his career with Estudiantes. Having progressing through their youth system, the attacking midfielder made the breakthrough into their first-team in 2020 under caretaker managers Leandro Desábato and Rodrigo Braña. After going unused on the substitutes' bench against Aldosivi on 31 October, Obregón made his senior debut on 7 November by coming off the bench for Martín Cauteruccio in a defeat away to San Lorenzo. In February 2022, Obregón joined Primera Nacional side Guillermo Brown on a one-year loan deal.

In January 2023, he joined Primera Nacional side Nueva Chicago on a one-year loan deal. He made his debut at a 1–1 away tie against All Boys on 3 February 2023.

== Personal life ==
In October 2020, it was announced that Obregón had tested positive for COVID-19 amid the pandemic; he was asymptomatic. He subsequently tested negative two weeks later.

== Career statistics ==
As of 8 November 2020.

Appearances and goals by club, season and competition
Club	Season	League			Cup		League Cup		Continental		Other		Total	
Club	Season	Division	Apps	Goals	Apps	Goals	Apps	Goals	Apps	Goals	Apps	Goals	Apps	Goals
Estudiantes	2020–21 (Note: Soccerway counts Copa de la Liga Profesional appearances as league appearances.)	Primera División	1	0	0	0	0	0	—		0	0	1	0
Guillermo Brown	2022	Primera Nacional	29	1	0	0	0	0	—		0	0	29	1
Nueva Chicago	2023	Primera Nacional	2	1	0	0	0	0	—		0	0	2	1
Career total			31	2	0	0	0	0	—		0	0	32	2
