= Joaquín Pereyra (Uruguayan football defender) =

Uruguayan footballer (born 1994)

Personal information
- Full name: Joaquín Alejandro Pereyra Cantero
- Date of birth: 10 July 1994 (age 32)
- Place of birth: Montevideo, Uruguay
- Height: 1.87 m (6 ft 2 in)
- Position: Centre-back

Team information
- Current team: Montevideo City Torque
- Number: 3

Youth career
- Danubio

Senior career*
Years	Team	Apps	(Gls)
2015–2017	Danubio	16	(0)
2016	→ Villa Teresa (loan)	0	(0)
2016–2017	→ Boston River (loan)	35	(0)
2018–2021	Boston River	17	(0)
2018	→ San Luis (loan)	10	(0)
2019	→ Barnechea (loan)	3	(0)
2020–2021	→ Montevideo City Torque (loan)	37	(1)
2022–	Montevideo City Torque	35	(1)
- * Club domestic league appearances and goals as of 12 April 2024

Joaquín Alejandro Pereyra Cantero (born 10 July 1994) is a Uruguayan professional footballer who plays as a centre-back for Montevideo City Torque.

== Club career ==
A product of Danubio, with whom he made his professional debut in 2015, Pereyra has also played for Villa Teresa, Boston River and Montevideo City Torque in the Uruguayan Primera División. As a member of Boston River, he took part and scored two goals in the 3–1 win against Comerciantes Unidos in the 2017 Copa Sudamericana, the first win at international level in the club history.

In the second half of 2018, he moved to Chile and joined on loan to San Luis de Quillota from Boston River in the Chilean top division. The next year, he was loaned out to Barnechea in the Primera B de Chile.
