= Mauro Vila =

Uruguayan footballer (born 1986)

Personal information
- Full name: Mauro Adrián Vila Wilkins
- Date of birth: February 23, 1986 (age 40)

Team information
- Current team: Boston River

Senior career*
| Years | Team | Apps | (Gls) |
| 2005–2009 | Defensor Sporting | | |
| 2009–2010 | Querétaro F.C. | | |
| 2010 | Indios de Ciudad Juárez | | |
| 2011 | Defensor Sporting | | |
| 2011–2012 | Almirante Brown | | |
| 2012 | Deportivo Quito | | |
| 2013–2015 | UTC | | |
| 2016– | Boston River | | |
- * Club domestic league appearances and goals

Mauro Adrián Vila Wilkins (Note: In this Spanish name, the first or paternal surname is Vila and the second or maternal family name is Wilkins.) (born 23 February 1986), known as Mauro Vila, is a Uruguayan footballer currently playing for Universidad Técnica de Cajamarca of the Torneo Descentralizado in Chile.

== Teams ==
- (Uruguay) Defensor Sporting 2005–2009
- (Mexico) Querétaro 2009–2010
- (Mexico) Indios de Ciudad Juárez 2010
- (Uruguay) Defensor Sporting 2011
- (Argentina) Almirante Brown 2011–2012
- (Ecuador) Deportivo Quito 2012
- (Peru) Universidad Técnica de Cajamarca 2013–2015
- (Uruguay) Boston River 2016-
