= Mauro Fernández (footballer, born 1997) =

Uruguayan association football player

Personal information
- Full name: Mauro Daniel Fernández Sayes
- Date of birth: 11 August 1997 (age 29)
- Place of birth: Nueva Palmira, Uruguay
- Height: 1.84 m (6 ft 0 in)
- Position: Centre-back

Team information
- Current team: Paternò
- Number: 21

Youth career
- –2018: Liverpool Montevideo

Senior career*
Years	Team	Apps	(Gls)
2018–2021	Juventud	20	(1)
2021–2022	Villa Española	10	(0)
2022	Portuguesa	19	(2)
2023	Cerrito	11	(0)
2023–2024	Zamora	8	(0)
2024–2025	Cerrito	18	(1)
2025	Deutscher		
2025–	Paternò	0	(0)
- * Club domestic league appearances and goals as of 09:59, 22 February 2026 (UTC)

Mauro Daniel Fernández Sayes (born 11 August 1997) is a Uruguayan footballer who plays as a centre back for Serie D club Paternò.

== Career ==
=== Juventud de Las Piedras ===
Fernández signed for Juventud in July 2018, joining from Montevideo-based Liverpool. He made his competitive debut for the club on 20 October 2018, coming on as a 75th-minute substitute for Rodrigo Gómez in a 4–1 victory over Oriental. He scored his first goal for the club over two years later, scoring on the opening day of the 2021 season in a 3–1 victory over Villa Teresa.

=== Portuguesa ===
After a short stint with Villa Española in 2021, Fernández joined Venezuelan Primera División club Portuguesa. He made his debut in the club's opening match of the season, a 1–1 draw with Academia Puerto Cabello. In June 2022, Fernández scored his maiden goal for the club; the lone goal in a 1–0 victory over Aragua.

== Career statistics ==
=== Club ===
As of match played 19 September 2022

Appearances and goals by club, season and competition
Club	Season	League			Cup		Other		Total	
Club	Season	Division	Apps	Goals	Apps	Goals	Apps	Goals	Apps	Goals
Juventud	2018	Uruguayan Segunda División	2	0	—		—		2	0
Juventud	2019	Uruguayan Primera División	15	0	—		—		15	0
Juventud	2020	Uruguayan Segunda División	1	0	—		—		1	0
Juventud	2021	Uruguayan Segunda División	2	1	—		—		2	1
Juventud	Total		20	1	—		—		20	1
Villa Española	2021	Uruguayan Primera División	10	0	—		—		10	0
Portuguesa	2022	Venezuelan Primera División	19	2	—		—		19	2
Career total			49	3	—		—		49	3
