= Estadio Parque Capurro =

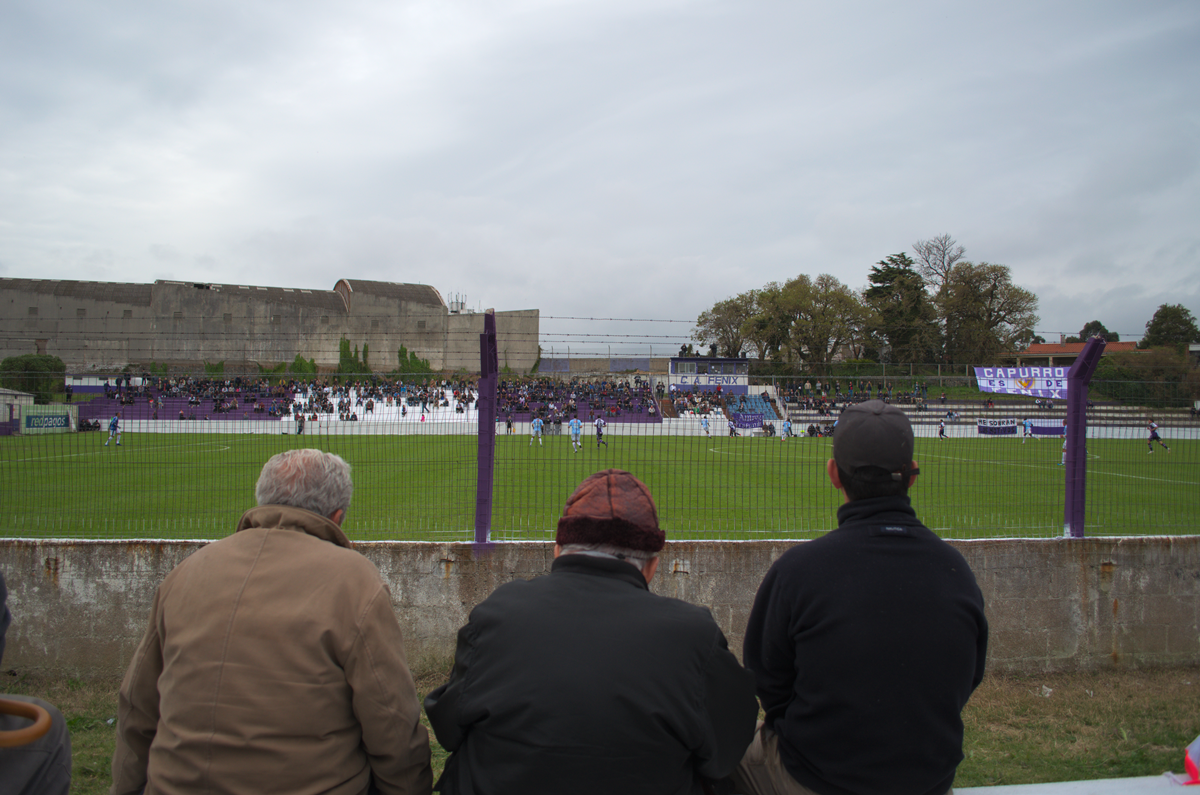
- Interactive map of Estadio Parque Capurro
- Location: Montevideo, Uruguay
- Coordinates: 34.873380°S 56.212358°W
- Owner: Centro Atlético Fénix
- Capacity: 10,000
- Surface: grass

Tenant
- Centro Atlético Fénix

Estadio Parque Capurro is a multi-use stadium in Montevideo, Uruguay. It is currently used primarily for football matches. The stadium holds 10,000 people and is the home stadium of Centro Atlético Fénix.
