= Álvaro Navarro =

Uruguayan footballer (born 1985)

Personal information
- Full name: Álvaro Damián Navarro Bica
- Date of birth: 28 January 1985 (age 41)
- Place of birth: Tacuarembó, Uruguay
- Height: 1.86 m (6 ft 1 in)
- Position: Centre forward

Senior career*
Years	Team	Apps	(Gls)
2003–2009	Defensor Sporting	147	(41)
2009–2010	Gimnasia La Plata	9	(2)
2011–2012	Godoy Cruz	45	(9)
2012–2023	Defensor Sporting	112	(31)
2012–2014	→ Cobresal (loan)	48	(11)
2014–2015	→ Olmedo (loan)	41	(18)
2015	→ Botafogo (loan)	15	(9)
2016–2017	→ Puebla (loan)	38	(8)

Managerial career
- 2024–2025: Defensor Sporting
- * Club domestic league appearances and goals

Álvaro Damián Navarro Bica (born 28 January 1985) is a Uruguayan football manager and former player who played as a forward.

== Honours ==
Botafogo

- Campeonato Brasileiro Série B: 2015
