= Jorge Zambrana =

Uruguayan footballer (born 1986)

Personal information
- Full name: Jorge Carlos Zambrana Echagüe
- Date of birth: 28 March 1986 (age 40)
- Place of birth: Uruguay
- Positions: Midfielder; winger; forward

Senior career*
Years	Team	Apps	(Gls)
-2011	River Plate	53+	(21+)
2011-2013	Peñarol	40	(3)
2013/2014	Carabobo F.C.	15	(1)
2013/2014	Danubio F.C.	10	(0)
2014/2015	C.A. Fénix	10	(1)
2014/2015	Cerro Largo F.C.	2	(0)
2015/2016	Boston River	7	(1)
2016	San Martín de Tucumán	7	(0)
2016/2017	Concepción Fútbol Club	11	(0)
2017	C.A. Rentistas	6	(1)
2017-2019	San Jorge de Tucumán	46	(12)
2019	Central Español	11	(1)
2020-	Racing Club de Montevideo	15	(3)
- * Club domestic league appearances and goals

Jorge Carlos Zambrana Echagüe (born 28 March 1986 in Uruguay) is a Uruguayan footballer.

== Career ==
Zambrana started his career with the Uruguayan Club Atlético River Plate, where he scored over 21 goals before joining Peñarol, the most successful team in Uruguay. From Peñarol, Zambrana signed for Venezuelan side Carabobo for financial reasons, before playing for Danubio, Fénix, and Cerro Largo, where he had trouble adapting to the Uruguayan second division.

After playing in Argentinean clubs San Martín de Tucumán and San Jorge de Tucumán, he claimed that the pitches were better in the Argentinean lower leagues than in Uruguay.
