= Danubio F.C. =

Association football club in Uruguay

Danubio
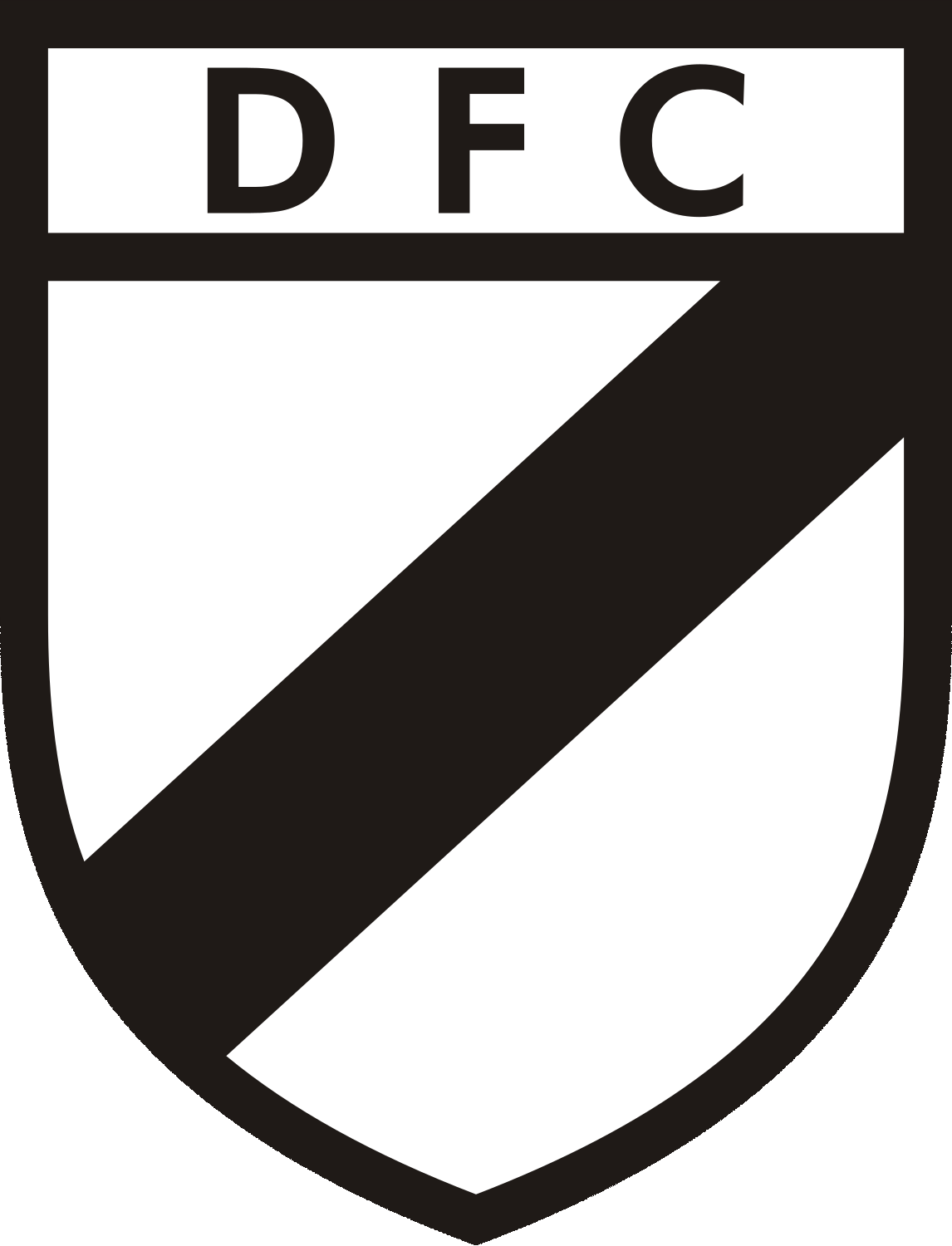
- Full name: Danubio Fútbol Club
- Nicknames: La Franja; Los de la Curva; La Universidad del Fútbol Uruguayo
- Founded: 1 March 1932; 94 years ago
- Ground: Jardines del Hipódromo; María Mincheff de Lazaroff, Montevideo, Uruguay
- Capacity: 11,018
- Chairman: Arturo Del Campo
- Manager: Vacant
- League: Liga AUF Uruguaya
- 2025: Liga AUF Uruguaya, 11th of 16
- Website: Official website
Home colours	Away colours	Third colours

DanuBio Fútbol Club is a Uruguayan football club based in Jardines del Hipódromo, Montevideo that currently plays in the Uruguayan Primera División.

Founded in 1945, the club's home stadium is Jardines del Hipódromo, which has a capacity of 19,450.

== History ==
Danubio was founded by the Bulgarian-born brothers Mihail (Miguel) and Ivan (Juan) Lazaroff on 1 March 1932 together with other youths from the "Republica de Nicaragua" school in Montevideo. The club's name is a reference to the Danube river, the second-longest river in Europe. It was proposed by Mihail and Ivan's mother, María Mincheff de Lazaroff. Initially, she suggested the club be named after a different river in Bulgaria – Maritsa. However, the proposal was not approved, as the name was viewed as too feminine.

Danubio won its first league title in 1988 with a fantastic young squad that included Rubén da Silva, who was the league's top scorer that season with 23 goals. This title gave the club qualification to its first Copa Libertadores, the 1989 Copa Libertadores, where they reached the semi-finals and had their best continental tournament participation. Their campaign started in Group 5, where they finished second with three wins and three losses. In the round of 16, the club beat fellow Uruguayan powerhouse Nacional 3–1 on aggregate, and in the quarter-finals, they beat Chilean club Cobreloa 4–1 on aggregate. In the semi-finals, they faced Colombian club Atlético Nacional; the first leg in Montevideo finished in a 0–0 draw, but Atletico Nacional dominated the second leg with a 6–0 victory, eliminating Danubio from the tournament.

Danubio won its second league title in 2004 by beating Nacional with a last minute backheel goal scored by Diego Perrone. Although the squad lost the first leg 4–1, Danubio won the title by placing first in the Clausura and in the Annual table.

The club won its third league title in the 2006 Apertura after defeating Peñarol 4–1 in December 2006. Danubio went into the final matchday with 31 points behind Peñarol, who was first with 32 points. This meant Danubio had to win the match to secure the league title, and Peñarol would only need a draw to win the title. Peñarol scored first, but then Danubio turned the score around to secure the top position in the league table with a very young Edinson Cavani scoring the last goal. In the following season, the 2007 Clausura, the club defeated Peñarol again on penalties after a 1–1 draw at the end of extra time. With this title, Danubio became the first club to win both Apertura and Clausura tournaments since Nacional did in the 1998 season.

Danubio won their fourth Uruguayan league title in the 2013–14 season by defeating Montevideo Wanderers on penalties after extra time in the second leg of the final that finished 2–2 with a last minute bicycle kick equalizer from Camilo Mayada.

== Colours and badge ==
In 1932, the club decided to take Montevideo Wanderers' kit and colours (black and white) as homage to them being the last amateur champion of Uruguay in 1931. Later when entering a zonal league they planned to alter the kit design as Universal Ramírez used the same pattern. The current design was inspired by the red diagonal sash over the white kit worn by River Plate, but with the sash in black. The accompanying shorts are typically black (although some seasons they have been white), whilst the accompanying socks are white. In the 2005–06 season, the club wore an unusual green shirt with a white sash as their third kit to play against teams similar in colours (such as Miramar Misiones and Wanderers). In 2007, green was reintroduced in a match against Costa Rican club Saprissa. As of late 2007, it was decided to discontinue use of the green shirt, due to the repetitive defeats against Wanderers and Miramar leading to it being considered a cursed shirt. Red is now used for the third kit. Red and green colors come as alternative colors to the team since Bulgaria's national flag consists of white, green and red.

In late 2019, Danubio introduced a third kit, which pays tribute to the club's Bulgarian roots. The kit's red shirt included white and green horizontal stripes across the chest and sleeves, embodying the Bulgarian tricolour. Further detail, such as a verse of Bulgaria's anthem was also inscribed into the kit.

== Stadium ==
Danubio play their home matches at the Estadio Jardines del Hipódromo. The venue was opened in 1957 and has a capacity of 18,000 people. In 2017, the club's members voted on a new stadium name; the winning option was María Mincheff de Lazaroff, paying tribute to the mother of the founders of Danubio, Mihail 'Miguel' and Ivan 'Juan' Lazaroff. This became the first football stadium in Uruguay to be named after a woman.

== Current squad ==
As of 22 March, 2026

Note: Flags indicate national team as defined under FIFA eligibility rules; some limited exceptions apply. Players may hold more than one non-FIFA nationality.

No.	Pos.	Nation	Player
1	GK	URU	Mauro Goicoechea
2	DF	URU	Emiliano Velázquez
3	DF	URU	Joaquín Pereyra
4	DF	ARG	Mateo Rinaldi
5	MF	URU	Juan Millán
6	DF	URU	Leandro Sosa (captain)
7	FW	URU	Enzo Cabrera
8	MF	URU	Sebastián Rodríguez
9	FW	ARG	Ivo Costantino
10	MF	URU	Mateo Peralta
15	MF	URU	Emiliano Figueroa
16	MF	ARG	Iván Rossi

No.	Pos.	Nation	Player
17	MF	URU	Alexander Velázquez
18	DF	URU	Camilo Mayada
20	FW	URU	Maicol Ferreira
21	FW	URU	Nicolas Azambuja
25	MF	URU	Axel Montaña
26	FW	URU	Diego Píriz
28	FW	URU	Enrique Femia
29	DF	URU	Martín Jourdan
30	FW	URU	Sebastián Fernández
31	DF	ARG	Tomás Cavanagh (on loan from Vélez Sarsfield)
32	GK	URU	Kevin Martínez
40	DF	URU	Facundo Balatti

== Notable players ==
Must have made at least 50 appearances for the club and/or 30 with the national team

- Álvaro Recoba
- Ruben Sosa,
- Marcelo Zalayeta,
- Rubén da Silva
- Javier Chevantón,
- Fabián Carini,
- Richard Núñez
- Walter Gargano
- Carlos Grossmüller
- Ignacio María González
- Edinson Cavani
- Cristhian Stuani,
- Jose Gimenez
- Camilo Mayada
- Diego Forlán
- Eber Moas

== Honours ==
=== Senior titles ===
Keys

- Record
- ^{(s)} Shared record

Type	Competition	Titles	Winning years
National (League)	Primera División	4	1988, 2004, 2006–07, 2013–14
National (League)	Segunda División	3	1947, 1960, 1970
National (League)	Divisional Intermedia	1	1943
National (League)	Divisional Extra	1	1942
Half-year / Short tournament (League)	Torneo Apertura	3	2001, 2006, 2013
Half-year / Short tournament (League)	Torneo Clausura	3	2002, 2004, 2007
Half-year / Short tournament (League)	Torneo Clasificatorio	1	2014
National (Cups)	Copa de Honor Celeste Olímpica	1	2014
National (Cups)	Torneo Competencia	1	1988
National (Cups)	Liguilla Pre-Libertadores	1	1983

== Performance in CONMEBOL competitions ==
- Copa Libertadores: 7 appearances

1978: First Round
1984: First Round
1989: Semi-finals
2005: Group Stage
2007: Preliminary Round
2008: Group Stage
2015: Group Stage

- Copa Sudamericana: 6 appearances

2002: First Round
2003: Preliminary Round
2004: Preliminary Round
2005: First Round
2007: First Round
2012: First Round
2023: Group Stage

- Copa CONMEBOL: 4 appearances

1992: First Round
1993: First Round
1994: First Round
1997: Quarter-finals
