= Uruguayan Primera División Amateur =

Primera División Amateur
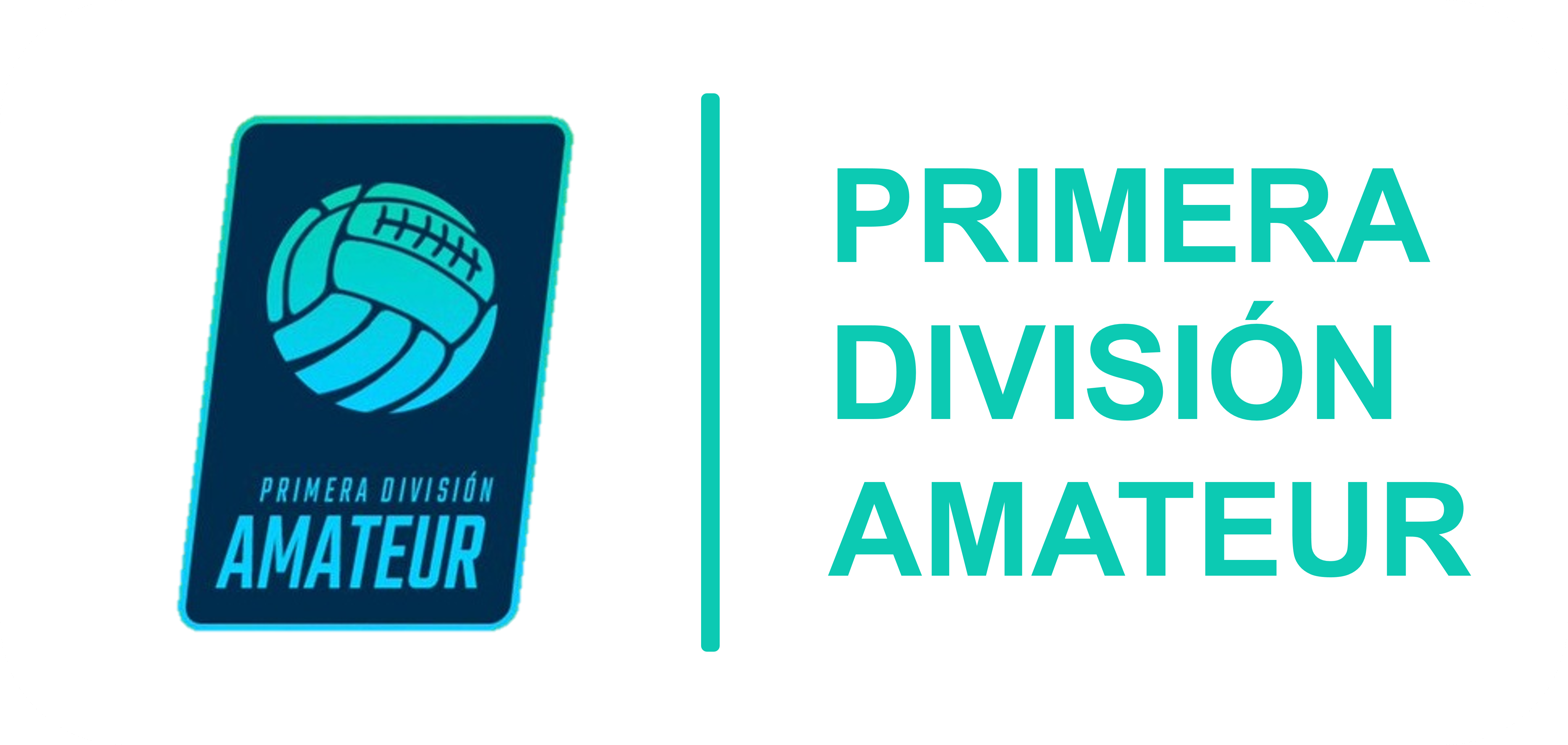
- Founded: 2017
- Country: Uruguay
- Confederation: CONMEBOL
- Number of clubs: 28 (2026)
- Level on pyramid: 3
- Promotion to: Segunda División
- Relegation to: Primera D
- Current champions: Paysandú (1st title) (2025)
- Broadcaster: Tenfield
- Website: segundab.com.uy

Primera División Amateur is the third division of the Asociación Uruguaya de Fútbol league system. The league was rebranded to Primera Divisional C in 2025.

== List of champions ==
Ed.	Season	Champion	Runner-up
Segunda División B Nacional
1	2017	Albion	Colón
2	2018	Bella Vista	Colón
Primera División Amateur
3	2019	Rocha	Uruguay Montevideo
4	2020	Uruguay Montevideo	Colón
5	2021	Miramar Misiones	La Luz
6	2022	Tacuarembó	Oriental
7	2023	Colón	Cooper
8	2024	Artigas	Central Español
Primera Divisional C
9	2025	Paysandú	Huracán
10	2026	Bella Vista	

== Titles by club ==
Club	Titles	Runners-up	Seasons won	Seasons runner-up
Colón	1	3	2023	2017, 2018, 2020
Uruguay Montevideo	1	1	2020	2019
Albion	1	—	2017	—
Artigas	1	—	2024	—
Bella Vista	1	—	2018	—
Miramar Misiones	1	—	2021	—
Paysandú	1	—	2025	—
Rocha	1	—	2019	—
Tacuarembó	1	—	2022	—
