= 2026 Liga AUF Uruguaya =

123rd season of the top-tier football league in Uruguay

Liga AUF Uruguaya
- Season: 2026
- Dates: 6 February – December 2026
- Relegated: Cerro Largo; Danubio; Progreso
- Copa Libertadores: Peñarol; Montevideo City Torque
- Copa Sudamericana: Montevideo Wanderers
- Matches: 295
- Goals: 694 (2.35 per match)
- Top goalscorer: Maximiliano Gómez (19 goals)
- Biggest home win: Albion 6–1 Central Español (17 April)
- Biggest away win: Wanderers 0–4 City Torque (22 February); Defensor Sporting 0–4 Liverpool (16 August); Danubio 0–4 Peñarol (5 September)
- Highest scoring: Albion 6–1 Central Español (17 April); Juventud 2–5 Wanderers (31 May)
- All statistics correct as of 20 November 2026.

The 2026 Liga Profesional de Primera División season, also known as the Liga AUF Uruguaya 2026, is the 123rd season of the Liga AUF Uruguaya, Uruguay's top-flight football league, and the 96th in which it is professional. The season, which was named "Juan Carlos de Lima", began on 6 February 2026.

Nacional are the defending champions.

== Teams ==
Sixteen teams compete in the season: the top thirteen teams in the relegation table of the 2025 season as well as three promoted teams from the 2025 Segunda División.

=== Team changes ===
The three lowest placed teams in the relegation table of the 2025 season (Plaza Colonia, Miramar Misiones and River Plate) were relegated to Segunda División for the 2026 season. They were replaced by the Segunda División champions Albion, the runners-up Central Español, and the winners of the promotion play-offs Deportivo Maldonado.

Albion returned to the top flight after four years, having participated for the last time in 2022, while Central Español returned after a 13-year absence, and Deportivo Maldonado returned after one season. On the other hand, Plaza Colonia were relegated after one season, Miramar Misiones returned to the second tier after two seasons, and River Plate ended a 21-year spell in the top flight.

=== Stadiums and locations ===
Locations of the 2026 season teams outside Montevideo.
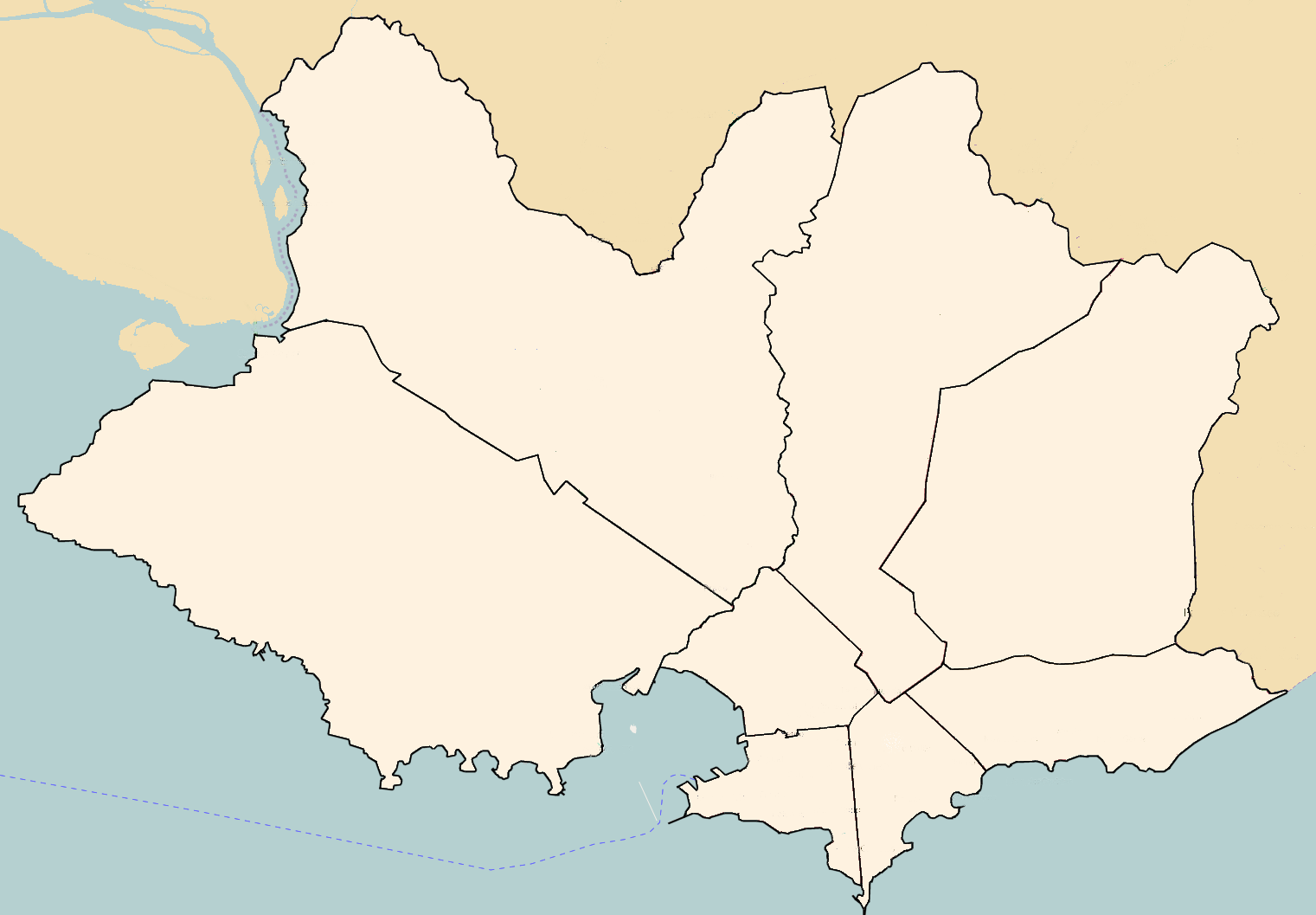
Locations of the 2026 Primera División teams within Montevideo.

Club	City	Home stadium	Capacity
Albion	Montevideo	Luis Franzini (Note: Albion play their home matches at Estadio Luis Franzini since their stadium Parque Dr. Enrique Falco Lichtemberger does not meet league requirements.)	16,000
Boston River	Florida	Campeones Olímpicos	5,124
Central Español	Montevideo	Parque Palermo	6,500
Cerro	Montevideo	Luis Tróccoli	25,000
Cerro Largo	Melo	Antonio Ubilla	9,000
Danubio	Montevideo	Jardines del Hipódromo	18,000
Defensor Sporting	Montevideo	Luis Franzini	16,000
Deportivo Maldonado	Maldonado	Domingo Burgueño Miguel	22,000
Juventud	Las Piedras	Parque Artigas	12,000
Liverpool	Montevideo	Parque Alfredo Víctor Viera (Note: Liverpool play their home matches at Parque Alfredo Víctor Viera since Estadio Belvedere was closed for reconstruction at the end of the 2025 season.)	11,000
Montevideo City Torque	Montevideo	Charrúa	14,000
Montevideo Wanderers	Montevideo	Parque Alfredo Víctor Viera	11,000
Nacional	Montevideo	Gran Parque Central	34,000
Peñarol	Montevideo	Campeón del Siglo	40,700
Progreso	Montevideo	Abraham Paladino	8,000
Racing	Montevideo	Osvaldo Roberto	8,500

=== Personnel and kits ===
Team	Manager	Kit manufacturer	Main shirt sponsor
Albion	(Uruguay) Federico Macías (Uruguay) Diego Franco	Kelme	Yerba Sara
Boston River	(Uruguay) Jorge Cazulo	Kelme	Asociación Española, Cotrans
Central Español	(Uruguay) Antonio Pacheco	Tiffosi	Fix
Cerro	(Uruguay) Alejandro Cappuccio	Mgr Sport	Médica Uruguaya
Cerro Largo	(Uruguay) Bruno Silva	Tiffosi	The La Planta
Danubio	(Uruguay) Leonel Rocco	Tiffosi	Médica Uruguaya
Defensor Sporting	(Uruguay) Mauricio Larriera	Kelme	Médica Uruguaya
Deportivo Maldonado	(Argentina) Gabriel Di Noia	Kelme	
Juventud	(Uruguay) Sergio Blanco	Macron	MG Motor
Liverpool	(Uruguay) Jorge Fossati	Mgr Sport	Puritas
Montevideo City Torque	(Uruguay) Marcelo Méndez	Puma	Mar-Plast
Montevideo Wanderers	(Uruguay) Mathías Corujo	Umbro	BYD
Nacional	(Uruguay) Daniel Carreño	Umbro	Antel
Peñarol	(Uruguay) Diego Aguirre	Puma	Antel
Progreso	(Uruguay) Tabaré Silva	Zenit	Médica Uruguaya
Racing	(Uruguay) Cristian Chambian	Adidas	Hidrolágeno

=== Managerial changes ===
Team	Outgoing manager	Manner of departure	Date of vacancy	Position in table	Incoming manager	Date of appointment
Torneo Apertura
Danubio	(Uruguay) Gustavo Matosas	End of caretaker spell	8 November 2025	Pre-season	(Argentina) Diego Monarriz	12 December 2025
Boston River	(Uruguay) Gustavo Ferreyra	End of caretaker spell	9 November 2025	Pre-season	(Argentina) Israel Damonte	19 November 2025
Montevideo Wanderers	(Uruguay) Daniel Carreño	Mutual agreement	10 November 2025	Pre-season	(Uruguay) Mathías Corujo	13 December 2025
Defensor Sporting	(Uruguay) Ignacio Ithurralde	End of contract	12 November 2025	Pre-season	(Uruguay) Román Cuello	9 December 2025
Albion	(Uruguay) Joaquín Boghossian	Health issues	4 December 2025	Pre-season	(Uruguay) Federico Nieves	4 December 2025
Liverpool	(Uruguay) Joaquín Papa	End of contract	12 December 2025	Pre-season	(Uruguay) Camilo Speranza	12 December 2025
Cerro	(Uruguay) Tabaré Silva	End of contract	31 December 2025	Pre-season	(Uruguay) Nelson Abeijón	5 January 2026
Cerro	(Uruguay) Nelson Abeijón	Resigned	14 March 2026	16th	(Uruguay) Alejandro Apud (Note: Álvaro Pintos and Jorge Rodríguez were the caretaker managers for the Torneo Apertura round 7 match against Peñarol on 21 March.)	16 March 2026
Boston River	(Argentina) Israel Damonte	Sacked	16 March 2026	15th	(Uruguay) Ignacio Ithurralde	17 March 2026
Nacional	(Brazil) Jadson Viera	Sacked	21 March 2026	10th	(Uruguay) Jorge Bava	22 March 2026
Juventud	(Argentina) Sebastián Méndez	Mutual agreement	4 April 2026	16th	(Uruguay) Sergio Blanco	6 April 2026
Danubio	(Argentina) Diego Monarriz	Sacked	5 April 2026	12th	(Uruguay) Gustavo Matosas (Note: Caretaker manager until the end of the Apertura tournament.)	5 April 2026
Liverpool	(Uruguay) Camilo Speranza	Resigned	6 April 2026	9th	(Uruguay) Gustavo Ferrín (Note: Caretaker manager.)	7 April 2026
Progreso	(Uruguay) Leonel Rocco	Sacked	13 April 2026	16th	(Uruguay) Tabaré Silva	14 April 2026
Liverpool	(Uruguay) Gustavo Ferrín	End of caretaker spell	25 April 2026	9th	(Uruguay) Jorge Fossati	25 April 2026
Torneo Intermedio
Danubio	(Uruguay) Gustavo Matosas	End of caretaker spell	9 May 2026	Pre-tournament	(Uruguay) Leonardo Ramos	13 May 2026
Central Español	(Uruguay) Pablo de Ambrosio	Sacked	9 May 2026	Pre-tournament	(Argentina) Diego Osella (Note: Santiago Sosa was the caretaker manager for the Torneo Intermedio round 1 and 2 matches against Defensor Sporting and Cerro on 17 and 24 May.)	13 May 2026
Cerro	(Uruguay) Alejandro Apud	Mutual agreement	11 May 2026	Pre-tournament	(Uruguay) Alejandro Cappuccio	13 May 2026
Cerro Largo	(Uruguay) Danielo Núñez	Leave of absence	18 May 2026	Serie A, 7th	(Uruguay) Ignacio Ordóñez	18 May 2026
Defensor Sporting	(Uruguay) Román Cuello	Sacked	25 May 2026	Serie A, 8th	(Uruguay) Gerardo Miranda	25 May 2026
Defensor Sporting	(Uruguay) Gerardo Miranda	End of caretaker spell	7 June 2026	Serie A, 8th	(Uruguay) Mauricio Larriera	2 June 2026
Danubio	(Uruguay) Leonardo Ramos	Sacked	3 August 2026	Serie B, 8th	(Uruguay) Gustavo Matosas	4 August 2026
Torneo Clausura
Cerro Largo	(Uruguay) Ignacio Ordóñez	End of caretaker spell	10 August 2026	8th	(Uruguay) Danielo Núñez	10 August 2026
Danubio	(Uruguay) Gustavo Matosas	Resigned	15 August 2026	11th	(Uruguay) Leonel Rocco	17 August 2026
Nacional	(Uruguay) Jorge Bava	Sacked	16 August 2026	15th	(Uruguay) Daniel Carreño	17 August 2026
Central Español	(Argentina) Diego Osella	Sacked	23 August 2026	11th	(Uruguay) Antonio Pacheco	24 August 2026
Cerro Largo	(Uruguay) Danielo Núñez	Resigned	5 September 2026	11th	(Uruguay) Ignacio Ordóñez	5 September 2026
Boston River	(Uruguay) Ignacio Ithurralde	Sacked	19 September 2026	9th	(Uruguay) Diego Jaume	20 September 2026
Boston River	(Uruguay) Diego Jaume	End of caretaker spell	29 September 2026	11th	(Uruguay) Jorge Cazulo	29 September 2026
Albion	(Uruguay) Federico Nieves	Sacked	29 September 2026	16th	(Uruguay) Federico Macías (Uruguay) Diego Franco	30 September 2026
Cerro Largo	(Uruguay) Ignacio Ordóñez	Sacked	5 October 2026	14th	(Uruguay) Bruno Silva	5 October 2026

== Torneo Apertura ==
The Torneo Apertura, named "Rafael Peña", was the first tournament of the 2026 season. It began on 6 February and ended on 11 May 2026. Racing won the tournament with two matches in hand on 26 April following a 1–0 win over Cerro Largo and defeats for both Deportivo Maldonado and Peñarol. By winning this tournament, Racing qualified for the semi-final of the Championship playoff.

=== Standings ===
Pos	Team	Pld	W	D	L	GF	GA	GD	Pts	Qualification
1	Racing	15	9	4	2	23	14	+9	31	Qualification for Championship playoff
2	Deportivo Maldonado	15	9	2	4	24	16	+8	29	
3	Albion	15	8	4	3	26	16	+10	28	
4	Peñarol	15	8	3	4	23	16	+7	27	
5	Central Español	15	7	3	5	23	22	+1	24	
6	Montevideo City Torque	15	6	5	4	22	16	+6	23	
7	Nacional	15	7	1	7	26	21	+5	22	
8	Defensor Sporting	15	5	6	4	13	11	+2	21	
9	Liverpool	15	5	5	5	20	18	+2	20	
10	Montevideo Wanderers	15	6	2	7	16	21	−5	20	
11	Danubio	15	4	6	5	17	21	−4	18	
12	Cerro Largo	15	5	2	8	16	19	−3	17	
13	Boston River	15	5	2	8	14	20	−6	17	
14	Juventud	15	4	3	8	17	22	−5	15	
15	Progreso	15	2	4	9	12	23	−11	10	
16	Cerro	15	2	4	9	8	24	−16	10	

Source: AUF, Soccerway
Rules for classification: 1) Points, 2) Playoff game, in case two teams are tied for first place.
If there are more than two teams tied in points: 2) Goal difference, 3) Goals for, 4) Head-to-head record, 5) Drawing of lots, 6) Playoff game, in case two teams are still tied for first place.

=== Results ===
Home \ Away	ALB	BOR	CES	CRR	CRL	DAN	DFS	DMA	JUV	LIV	MCT	WAN	NAC	PEÑ	PRO	RAC
Albion	—	—	6–1	3–0	2–2	—	—	—	—	1–2	—	2–1	3–2	0–1	—	1–3
Boston River	0–0	—	2–1	—	1–0	—	—	—	—	0–1	—	4–1	1–2	0–2	—	0–1
Central Español	—	—	—	3–1	1–3	2–2	—	2–1	—	—	—	0–1	—	2–1	—	2–0
Cerro	—	1–1	—	—	—	0–1	1–0	0–1	1–0	1–1	1–1	—	—	—	0–1	—
Cerro Largo	—	—	—	1–1	—	2–0	—	3–1	—	—	0–1	1–2	—	2–3	—	0–1
Danubio	0–1	2–0	—	—	—	—	0–0	1–1	4–1	—	1–1	—	—	—	2–2	—
Defensor Sporting	1–1	2–0	0–0	—	1–0	—	—	—	1–2	—	—	—	2–1	—	1–0	—
Deportivo Maldonado	1–2	2–1	—	—	—	—	1–0	—	2–1	—	1–0	—	4–2	—	2–0	—
Juventud	0–1	1–2	0–1	—	0–1	—	—	—	—	1–1	—	2–1	3–1	—	1–0	—
Liverpool	—	—	3–3	—	2–0	3–0	1–2	0–2	—	—	0–0	—	1–3	—	—	—
Montevideo City Torque	0–1	4–1	2–1	—	—	—	1–0	—	2–2	—	—	—	2–3	—	2–1	—
Montevideo Wanderers	—	—	—	3–0	—	2–1	1–1	0–0	—	1–0	0–4	—	—	1–0	—	1–2
Nacional	—	—	0–1	4–0	3–0	1–2	—	—	—	—	—	2–0	—	0–1	—	1–1
Peñarol	—	—	—	3–1	—	1–1	1–1	2–1	2–2	0–2	3–1	—	—	—	—	1–2
Progreso	2–2	0–1	0–3	—	0–1	—	—	—	—	3–3	—	2–1	0–1	0–2	—	—
Racing	—	—	—	1–0	—	4–0	1–1	2–4	2–1	1–0	1–1	—	—	—	1–1	—

Source: AUF, Soccerway
Legend: Blue = home team win; Yellow = draw; Red = away team win.

== Torneo Intermedio ==
The Torneo Intermedio, named "Héctor Castro", was the second tournament of the 2026 season, played between the Apertura and Clausura tournaments. It consisted of two groups whose composition depended on the final standings of the Torneo Apertura, with the Apertura winners playing in Serie A along with the teams placing 4th, 5th, 8th, 9th, 12th, 13th, and last in the Apertura, and the remaining teams being placed in Serie B.

The tournament started on 15 May and ended on 5 August, being paused from 8 June to 5 July due to the 2026 FIFA World Cup.

Peñarol won the tournament after defeating Montevideo Wanderers 5–1 in the final. By winning the Torneo Intermedio, they qualified for the 2027 Supercopa Uruguaya and were assured of a berth into the 2027 Copa Sudamericana.

=== Serie A ===
Pos	Team	Pld	W	D	L	GF	GA	GD	Pts	Qualification	PEÑ	CRL	RAC	LIV	CES	CRR	DFS	BOR
1	Peñarol	7	5	1	1	12	3	+9	16	Advance to Torneo Intermedio Final	—	3–0	—	2–1	0–1	—	—	3–0
2	Cerro Largo	7	3	2	2	7	5	+2	11		—	—	—	—	—	2–0	1–1	3–0
3	Racing	7	2	4	1	4	3	+1	10		1–1	1–0	—	—	—	—	0–0	1–0
4	Liverpool	7	2	3	2	5	5	0	9		—	0–0	0–0	—	—	1–2	—	—
5	Central Español	7	2	3	2	4	4	0	9		—	0–1	1–1	0–0	—	—	2–1	—
6	Cerro (Note: Cerro were deducted one point as punishment for crowd disturbances in their Torneo Apertura match against Nacional.)	7	3	0	4	6	10	−4	8		0–1	—	1–0	—	1–0	—	—	—
7	Defensor Sporting	7	1	3	3	6	9	−3	6		0–2	—	—	1–2	—	2–1	—	1–1
8	Boston River	7	1	2	4	5	10	−5	5		—	—	—	0–1	0–0	4–1	—	—

Source: AUF
Legend: Blue = home team win; Yellow = draw; Red = away team win.
Rules for classification: 1) Points, 2) Goal difference, 3) Goals for, 4) Head-to-head record, 5) Drawing of lots.

=== Serie B ===
Pos	Team	Pld	W	D	L	GF	GA	GD	Pts	Qualification	WAN	NAC	DMA	MCT	JUV	ALB	PRO	DAN
1	Montevideo Wanderers	7	4	3	0	12	4	+8	15	Advance to Torneo Intermedio Final	—	—	1–1	—	—	—	2–0	0–0
2	Nacional	7	4	1	2	8	8	0	13		1–2	—	—	—	2–1	1–0	2–1	—
3	Deportivo Maldonado	7	3	3	1	12	6	+6	12		—	3–0	—	—	0–0	1–1	—	3–1
4	Montevideo City Torque	7	4	0	3	11	11	0	12		0–2	1–2	2–4	—	—	—	—	1–0
5	Juventud	7	2	2	3	8	11	−3	8		2–5	—	—	1–3	—	—	2–0	—
6	Albion	7	1	3	3	6	8	−2	6		0–0	—	—	1–2	0–1	—	—	2–2
7	Progreso	7	2	0	5	6	11	−5	6		—	—	1–0	1–2	—	1–2	—	—
8	Danubio	7	0	4	3	5	9	−4	4		—	0–0	—	—	1–1	—	1–2	—

Source: AUF
Legend: Blue = home team win; Yellow = draw; Red = away team win.
Rules for classification: 1) Points, 2) Goal difference, 3) Goals for, 4) Head-to-head record, 5) Drawing of lots.

=== Torneo Intermedio Final ===
5 August 2026
20:00 UTC−3

Peñarol	5–1	Montevideo Wanderers
Espinosa 14'; Arezo 22'; Hernández 30'; Jaime 45'; Remedi 89'	Report	Cosentino 19'

Estadio Centenario, Montevideo
Referee: Mathías de Armas

== Torneo Clausura ==
The Torneo Clausura, named "Juan Lema Benzo", is the third and final tournament of the 2026 season. It began on 7 August and is scheduled to end on 23 November 2026. Liverpool won the tournament with one match in hand, after defeating Danubio 2–1 on 15 November 2026. By winning this tournament, Liverpool qualified for the semi-final of the Championship playoff.

=== Standings ===
Pos	Team	Pld	W	D	L	GF	GA	GD	Pts	Qualification
1	Liverpool (Q)	15	10	3	2	24	11	+13	33	Qualification for Championship playoff
2	Montevideo City Torque	15	9	3	3	29	17	+12	30	
3	Nacional	15	8	3	4	20	16	+4	27	
4	Peñarol (Note: Peñarol were deducted one point as punishment for crowd disturbances in their match against Nacional.)	15	7	6	2	21	10	+11	26	
5	Cerro	15	7	3	5	18	19	−1	24	
6	Racing	15	6	5	4	21	16	+5	23	
7	Deportivo Maldonado	15	6	4	5	18	12	+6	22	
8	Montevideo Wanderers	15	6	4	5	18	20	−2	22	
9	Progreso	15	6	3	6	16	18	−2	21	
10	Juventud	14	4	6	4	13	12	+1	18	
11	Boston River	15	5	3	7	16	18	−2	18	
12	Albion	14	4	2	8	16	21	−5	14	
13	Defensor Sporting	14	3	4	7	17	24	−7	13	
14	Central Español	15	3	2	10	9	23	−14	11	
15	Danubio	14	2	4	8	8	17	−9	10	
16	Cerro Largo	15	1	7	7	12	22	−10	10	

Updated to match(es) played on 20 November 2026. Source: AUF, Soccerway
Rules for classification: 1) Points, 2) Playoff game, in case two teams are tied for first place.
If there are more than two teams tied in points: 2) Goal difference, 3) Goals for, 4) Head-to-head record, 5) Drawing of lots, 6) Playoff game, in case two teams are still tied for first place.
(Q) Qualified for the phase indicated

=== Results ===
Home \ Away	ALB	BOR	CES	CRR	CRL	DAN	DFS	DMA	JUV	LIV	MCT	WAN	NAC	PEÑ	PRO	RAC
Albion	—	2–3	—	—	—		3–2	0–0	1–3	—	2–1	—	—	—	0–1	—
Boston River	—	—	—	1–1	—	0–0	1–0	1–0	0–0	—	1–2	—	—	—	1–2	—
Central Español	1–3	1–0	—	—	—	—	1–1	—	0–0	1–2	1–4	—	0–1	—	1–0	—
Cerro	2–1	—	1–2	—	1–1	—	—	—	—	—	—	0–2	2–0	1–2	—	1–0
Cerro Largo	0–1	2–0	0–0	—	—	—	1–1	—	1–1	1–1	—	—	0–2	—	2–2	—
Danubio	—	—	1–0	0–1	2–1	—	—	—	—	1–2	—	1–1	1–2	0–4	—	0–0
Defensor Sporting	—	—	—	2–3	—	1–0	—	1–0	—	0–4	1–3	0–1	—	1–1	—	3–3
Deportivo Maldonado	—	—	3–0	0–1	2–0	2–1	—	—	—	1–1	—	2–0	—	0–0	—	2–2
Juventud	—	—	—	0–0	—	1–1		2–0	—	—	0–1	—	—	0–0	—	2–0
Liverpool	1–0	1–0	—	4–0	—	—	—	—	2–0	—	—	0–2	—	1–0	3–2	0–0
Montevideo City Torque	—	—	—	3–1	2–1	1–0	—	0–2	—	3–1	—	5–1	—	1–1	—	2–2
Montevideo Wanderers	2–1	1–3	3–0	—	1–1	—	—	—	2–1	—	—	—	1–1	—	0–1	—
Nacional	1–1	1–2	—	—	—	—	3–2	3–2	2–2	0–1	2–0	—	—	—	1–0	—
Peñarol	3–1	2–1	2–1	—	3–0	—	—	—	—	—	—	1–1	0–1	—	1–1	—
Progreso	—	—	—	1–3	—	1–0	0–2	0–2	2–0	—	1–1	—	—	—	—	2–1
Racing	1–0	3–2	1–0	—	3–1	—	—	—	—	—	—	3–0	2–0	0–1	—	—

Updated to match(es) played on 20 November 2026. Source: AUF, Soccerway
Legend: Blue = home team win; Yellow = draw; Red = away team win.

== Aggregate table ==
The results of the Apertura and Clausura tournaments, as well as the first phase of the Torneo Intermedio, are combined into a single table. The team placing first in this table at the end of the season will qualify for the championship playoff finals and the Copa Libertadores group stage. The aggregate table will also award one berth into the Copa Libertadores second stage, and two berths into the Copa Sudamericana first stage.

Pos	Team	Pld	W	D	L	GF	GA	GD	Pts	Qualification
1	Peñarol (Note: Peñarol were deducted one point as punishment for crowd disturbances in their Torneo Clausura match against Nacional.) (Q)	37	20	10	7	56	29	+27	69	Advance to Championship playoff and qualification for Copa Libertadores group stage
2	Montevideo City Torque (Q)	37	19	8	10	62	44	+18	65	Qualification for Copa Libertadores second stage
3	Racing (X)	37	17	13	7	48	33	+15	64	Advance to Championship playoff and qualification for Copa Libertadores or Copa Sudamericana (Note: The championship playoff semi-final winner will qualify for the Copa Libertadores group stage, while the semi-final loser will qualify for the Copa Sudamericana first stage.)
4	Deportivo Maldonado (X)	37	18	9	10	54	34	+20	63	Qualification for Copa Sudamericana first stage (Note: Since the Torneo Intermedio winners Peñarol qualified for the Copa Libertadores on league performance, their Copa Sudamericana first stage berth was passed to the aggregate table's highest-placed team not already qualified for South American competition.)
5	Liverpool (X)	37	17	11	9	49	34	+15	62	Advance to Championship playoff and qualification for Copa Libertadores or Copa Sudamericana
6	Nacional (X)	37	19	5	13	54	45	+9	62	Qualification for Copa Sudamericana first stage
7	Montevideo Wanderers (Q)	37	16	9	12	46	45	+1	57	Qualification for Copa Sudamericana first stage
8	Albion	36	13	9	14	48	45	+3	48	
9	Central Español	37	12	8	17	36	49	−13	44	
10	Cerro (Note: Cerro were deducted one point as punishment for crowd disturbances in their Torneo Apertura match against Nacional.)	37	12	7	18	32	53	−21	42	
11	Juventud	36	10	11	15	38	45	−7	41	
12	Defensor Sporting	36	9	13	14	36	44	−8	40	
13	Boston River	37	11	7	19	35	48	−13	40	
14	Cerro Largo	37	9	11	17	35	46	−11	38	
15	Progreso	37	10	7	20	34	52	−18	37	
16	Danubio	36	6	14	16	30	47	−17	32	

Updated to match(es) played on 20 November 2026. Source: AUF
Rules for classification: 1) Points, 2) Playoff game (only if needed to decide first place between two teams), 3) Goal difference, 4) Goals for, 5) Head-to-head record, 6) Drawing of lots, 7) Playoff game, only if two teams are still tied for first place.
(Q) Qualified for the phase indicated; (X) Assured of Copa Sudamericana, but may still qualify for Copa Libertadores

== Championship playoff ==
The Torneo Apertura winners Racing will play a semi-final match against the Torneo Clausura winners Liverpool, while Peñarol as the top team in the aggregate table received a bye to the finals, which will be played over two legs.

Both championship playoff finalists will qualify for the Copa Libertadores group stage, while the semi-final loser will be entitled to a Copa Sudamericana berth in case they do not qualify for the Copa Libertadores.

Semi-final	Finals
	Semi-final winners
Racing	Peñarol
Liverpool

=== Semi-final ===
27 November 2026
20:30 UTC−3

Racing	v	Liverpool

Estadio Domingo Burgueño, Maldonado

== Top scorers ==
As of 20 November 2026

Rank	Player	Club	Goals
1	(Uruguay) Maximiliano Gómez	Nacional	19
2	(Argentina) Álvaro López	Albion	17
3	(Uruguay) Matías Arezo	Peñarol	15
4	(Uruguay) Federico Martínez	Liverpool	14
4	(Uruguay) Salomón Rodríguez	Montevideo City Torque	14
6	(Uruguay) Nahuel Da Silva	Montevideo City Torque	12
6	(Uruguay) Luciano Cosentino	Montevideo Wanderers	12
8	(Uruguay) Nahuel López	Progreso	11
9	(Uruguay) Christian Tabó	Deportivo Maldonado	10
9	(Uruguay) Sebastián Da Silva	Racing	10

Source: AUF

== Relegation ==
Relegation was determined at the end of the season by computing an average of the total of points earned per game over the two most recent seasons: 2025 and 2026. As the three teams with the lowest average at the end of the season, Cerro Largo, Danubio, and Progreso were relegated to Segunda División for the following season.

Pos	Team	2025 Pts	2026 Pts	Total Pts	Total Pld	Avg	Relegation
1	Peñarol	78	69	147	74	1.986	
2	Nacional	79	62	141	74	1.905	
3	Liverpool	65	62	127	74	1.716	
4	Deportivo Maldonado	—	63	63	37	1.703	
5	Racing	53	64	117	74	1.581	
6	Montevideo City Torque	49	65	114	74	1.541	
7	Juventud	61	41	102	73	1.397	
8	Defensor Sporting	61	40	101	73	1.384	
9	Albion	—	48	48	36	1.333	
10	Boston River	55	40	95	74	1.284	
11	Montevideo Wanderers	31	57	88	74	1.189	
12	Central Español	—	44	44	37	1.189	
13	Cerro	46	42	88	74	1.189	
14	Cerro Largo (R)	49	38	87	74	1.176	Relegation to Segunda División
15	Danubio (R)	43	32	75	73	1.027	Relegation to Segunda División
16	Progreso (R)	39	37	76	74	1.027	Relegation to Segunda División

Updated to match(es) played on 20 November 2026. Source: AUF

== See also ==
- 2026 Copa de la Liga AUF
- 2026 Copa Uruguay
- 2026 Uruguayan Segunda División season
