= 2025 Liga AUF Uruguaya =

122nd season of the top-tier football league in Uruguay

Liga AUF Uruguaya
- Season: 2025
- Dates: 31 January – 30 November 2025
- Champions: Nacional (50th title)
- Relegated: Plaza Colonia; River Plate; Miramar Misiones
- Copa Libertadores: Nacional; Peñarol; Liverpool; Juventud
- Copa Sudamericana: Defensor Sporting; Boston River; Racing; Montevideo City Torque
- Matches: 300
- Goals: 697 (2.32 per match)
- Top goalscorer: Abel Hernández (25 goals)
- Biggest home win: Boston River 6–1 Plaza Colonia (20 September)
- Biggest away win: Progreso 0–5 City Torque (1 November)
- Highest scoring: Nacional 5–2 City Torque (2 August); Boston River 6–1 Plaza Colonia (20 September)

The 2025 Liga Profesional de Primera División season, also known as the Liga AUF Uruguaya 2025, was the 122nd season of the Uruguayan Primera División, Uruguay's top-flight football league, and its 95th professional season. The season, which was named "Juan Manuel Izquierdo", began on 31 January and ended on 30 November 2025.

Nacional were the champions, winning their fiftieth league championship after topping the season's aggregate table and defeating the defending champions Peñarol in the finals.

== Teams ==
16 teams competed in the season: the top thirteen teams in the relegation table of the 2024 season as well as three promoted teams from the Segunda División. The three lowest placed teams in the relegation table of the 2024 season (Rampla Juniors, Fénix and Deportivo Maldonado) were relegated to the Segunda División for the 2025 season. They were replaced by the Segunda División champions Plaza Colonia, the runners-up Montevideo City Torque, and the winners of the promotion play-offs Juventud.

Plaza Colonia and City Torque both returned to the top flight after one season and Juventud played in Primera División for the first time since 2019, while Rampla Juniors were relegated after one season, Fénix returned to the second tier after a 14-year spell in Primera División, and Deportivo Maldonado were relegated after five seasons.

=== Stadiums and locations ===
Locations of the 2025 season teams outside Montevideo.
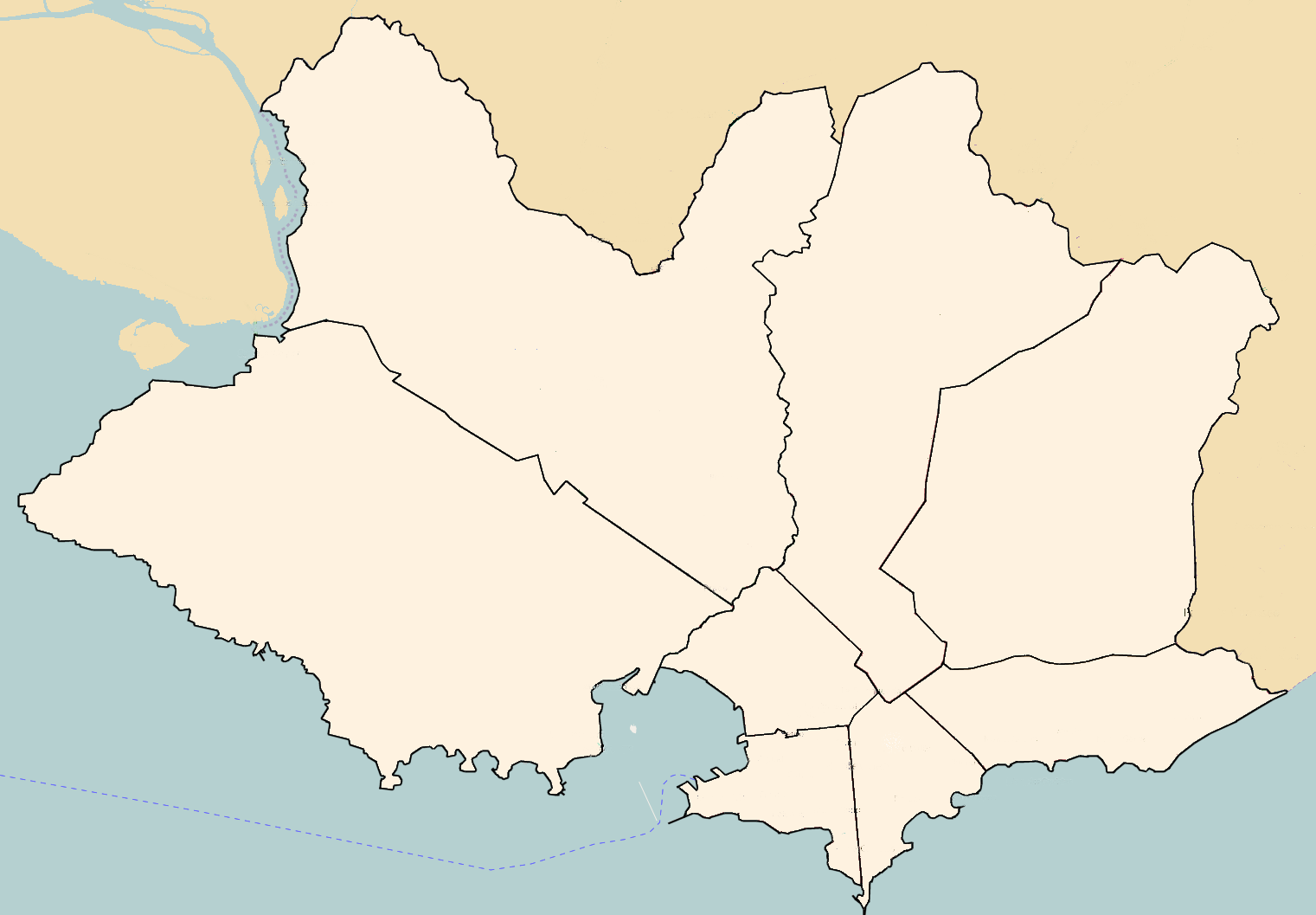
Locations of the 2025 Primera División teams within Montevideo.

Club	City	Home stadium	Capacity
Boston River	Florida	Campeones Olímpicos	5,124
Cerro	Montevideo	Luis Tróccoli	25,000
Cerro Largo	Melo	Antonio Ubilla	9,000
Danubio	Montevideo	Jardines del Hipódromo	18,000
Defensor Sporting	Montevideo	Luis Franzini	18,000
Juventud	Las Piedras	Parque Artigas	12,000
Liverpool	Montevideo	Belvedere	10,000
Miramar Misiones	Montevideo	Parque Palermo (Note: Used by Miramar Misiones for their home matches since their regular stadium Parque Luis Méndez Piana did not meet league requirements.)	6,500
Montevideo City Torque	Montevideo	Centenario	60,235
Montevideo Wanderers	Montevideo	Parque Alfredo Víctor Viera	11,000
Nacional	Montevideo	Gran Parque Central	34,000
Peñarol	Montevideo	Campeón del Siglo	40,700
Plaza Colonia	Colonia	Juan Gaspar Prandi	4,500
Progreso	Montevideo	Abraham Paladino	8,000
Racing	Montevideo	Osvaldo Roberto	8,500
River Plate	Montevideo	Parque Federico Omar Saroldi	6,000

=== Personnel and kits ===
Team	Manager	Kit manufacturer	Main shirt sponsor
Boston River	(Uruguay) Gustavo Ferreyra (caretaker)	Kelme	Asociación Española, Cotrans, Schneider, Europcar
Cerro	(Uruguay) Tabaré Silva	Mgr Sport	Médica Uruguaya
Cerro Largo	(Uruguay) Danielo Núñez	Concreto Sport	The La Planta
Danubio	(Uruguay) Gustavo Matosas (caretaker)	Tiffosi	CUTCSA
Defensor Sporting	(Uruguay) Ignacio Ithurralde	Kelme	Médica Uruguaya
Juventud	(Argentina) Sebastián Méndez	Macron	Frigorífico Las Piedras
Liverpool	(Uruguay) Joaquín Papa	Mgr Sport	Puritas
Miramar Misiones	(Uruguay) Bernardo Giordano (caretaker)	Mgr Sport	Fix
Montevideo City Torque	(Uruguay) Marcelo Méndez	Puma	Mar-Plast
Montevideo Wanderers	(Uruguay) Daniel Carreño	Umbro	BYD
Nacional	(Brazil) Jadson Viera	Umbro	Antel
Peñarol	(Uruguay) Diego Aguirre	Puma	Antel
Plaza Colonia	(Uruguay) Luis Alberto Mena (caretaker)	Mgr Sport	Montes del Plata
Progreso	(Uruguay) Leonel Rocco	XU	Médica Uruguaya
Racing	(Uruguay) Cristian Chambian	Macron	
River Plate	(Uruguay) Raúl Salazar	Mgr Sport	Macromercado

=== Managerial changes ===
Team	Outgoing manager	Manner of departure	Date of vacancy	Position in table	Incoming manager	Date of appointment
Torneo Apertura
Montevideo City Torque	(Uruguay) Pablo Gaglianone	End of caretaker spell	26 November 2024	Pre-season	(Argentina) Martín Cicotello	23 December 2024
Cerro	(Uruguay) Ignacio Pallas	End of contract	30 November 2024	Pre-season	(Uruguay) Tabaré Silva	4 January 2025
Progreso	(Uruguay) Carlos Canobbio	End of contract	4 December 2024	Pre-season	(Uruguay) Javier Méndez	12 December 2024
Racing	(Uruguay) Eduardo Espinel	End of contract	9 December 2024	Pre-season	(Uruguay) Darío Rodríguez	27 December 2024
River Plate	(Uruguay) Francisco Palladino	End of contract	30 December 2024	Pre-season	(Uruguay) Diego López	30 December 2024
Racing	(Uruguay) Darío Rodríguez	Sacked	17 February 2025	14th	(Uruguay) Cristian Chambian (Note: Originally as caretaker manager along with Gonzalo Aguilar, appointed on a permanent basis on 28 March 2025.)	17 February 2025
Miramar Misiones	(Uruguay) Walter Pandiani	Sacked	18 February 2025	15th	(Uruguay) Horacio Peralta	21 February 2025
Montevideo Wanderers	(Uruguay) Antonio Pacheco	Sacked	6 March 2025	14th	(Uruguay) Juan Manuel Martínez (Note: Originally as caretaker manager, appointed on a permanent basis on 19 March 2025.)	6 March 2025
Danubio	(Uruguay) Alejandro Apud	Sacked	7 March 2025	9th	(Uruguay) Juan Manuel Olivera	7 March 2025
Defensor Sporting	(Uruguay) Álvaro Navarro	Sacked	27 March 2025	2nd	(Uruguay) Ignacio Ithurralde (Note: Gerardo Miranda was the caretaker manager for the Torneo Apertura 9th round match against Miramar Misiones.)	31 March 2025
River Plate	(Uruguay) Diego López	Sacked	29 March 2025	16th	(Uruguay) Julio César Ribas	31 March 2025
Nacional	(Uruguay) Martín Lasarte	Mutual agreement	30 March 2025	7th	(Uruguay) Martín Ligüera (Note: Caretaker manager.)	30 March 2025
Nacional	(Uruguay) Martín Ligüera	End of caretaker spell	6 April 2025	6th	(Uruguay) Pablo Peirano	5 April 2025
Progreso	(Uruguay) Javier Méndez	Sacked	7 April 2025	15th	(Uruguay) Alejandro Larrea (Note: Originally as caretaker manager, appointed on a permanent basis on 17 April 2025.)	7 April 2025
Montevideo Wanderers	(Uruguay) Juan Manuel Martínez	Returned to the youth setup	2 May 2025	14th	(Uruguay) Alejandro Apud	2 May 2025
Torneo Intermedio
Montevideo City Torque	(Argentina) Martín Cicotello	Sacked	5 July 2025	Serie B, 7th	(Uruguay) Marcelo Méndez	10 July 2025
Torneo Clausura
Progreso	(Uruguay) Alejandro Larrea	Sacked	17 August 2025	16th	(Uruguay) Leonel Rocco	18 August 2025
River Plate	(Uruguay) Julio César Ribas	Sacked	18 August 2025	14th	(Uruguay) Raúl Salazar	19 August 2025
Danubio	(Uruguay) Juan Manuel Olivera	Sacked	24 August 2025	12th	(Uruguay) Gustavo Matosas	24 August 2025
Miramar Misiones	(Uruguay) Horacio Peralta	Sacked	24 August 2025	11th	(Uruguay) Bernardo Giordano	24 August 2025
Montevideo Wanderers	(Uruguay) Alejandro Apud	Sacked	28 August 2025	14th	(Uruguay) Daniel Carreño	29 August 2025
Plaza Colonia	(Uruguay) Sebastián Díaz	Resigned	21 September 2025	16th	(Uruguay) Luis Alberto Mena	23 September 2025
Juventud	(Argentina) Diego Monarriz	Sacked	13 October 2025	13th	(Argentina) Sebastián Méndez	16 October 2025
Nacional	(Uruguay) Pablo Peirano	Sacked	27 October 2025	2nd	(Brazil) Jadson Viera	27 October 2025
Boston River	(Brazil) Jadson Viera	Signed by Nacional	27 October 2025	4th	(Uruguay) Gustavo Ferreyra	28 October 2025

== Torneo Apertura ==
The Torneo Apertura, named "Eduardo Arsuaga", was the first tournament of the 2025 season. It began on 31 January and ended on 19 May 2025.

=== Standings ===
Pos	Team	Pld	W	D	L	GF	GA	GD	Pts	Qualification
1	Liverpool	15	9	5	1	22	9	+13	32	Advance to Championship playoff
2	Nacional	15	9	4	2	35	16	+19	31	
3	Juventud	15	9	3	3	23	15	+8	30	
4	Peñarol	15	8	3	4	21	17	+4	27	
5	Defensor Sporting	15	7	3	5	17	12	+5	24	
6	Racing	15	6	5	4	14	10	+4	23	
7	Boston River	15	6	4	5	16	17	−1	22	
8	Cerro Largo	15	5	6	4	15	16	−1	21	
9	Plaza Colonia	15	5	4	6	13	13	0	19	
10	Montevideo City Torque	15	4	5	6	16	22	−6	17	
11	Progreso	15	3	6	6	17	27	−10	15	
12	Cerro (Note: Cerro were deducted one point as punishment for the abandonment of their match against Peñarol.)	15	3	6	6	13	20	−7	14	
13	Montevideo Wanderers	15	2	6	7	12	17	−5	12 (Note: A drawing of lots was held on 20 May 2025 to determine the final positions of Montevideo Wanderers and Danubio, which was won by the former side.)	
14	Danubio	15	1	9	5	12	17	−5	12	
15	Miramar Misiones	15	3	3	9	16	24	−8	12	
16	River Plate	15	2	4	9	10	20	−10	10	

Source: AUF, Soccerway
Rules for classification: 1) Points, 2) Playoff game (only if needed to decide first place between two teams), 3) Goal difference, 4) Goals for, 5) Head-to-head record, 6) Drawing of lots, 7) Playoff game, only if two teams are still tied for first place.

=== Results ===
Home \ Away	BOR	CRR	CRL	DAN	DFS	JUV	LIV	MIM	MCT	WAN	NAC	PEÑ	PCO	PRO	RAC	RIV
Boston River	—	0–0	1–0	—	—	—	0–1	2–0	0–0	1–0	2–3	—	—	—	1–3	—
Cerro	—	—	—	1–1	—	2–1	—	—	1–2	2–1	—	—	0–1	0–0	—	1–1
Cerro Largo	—	0–0	—	—	—	1–1	—	3–2	1–1	—	0–4	—	2–1	4–1	—	1–0
Danubio	1–2	—	0–0	—	1–1	—	1–1	—	—	2–2	—	0–1	—	1–1	0–0	—
Defensor Sporting	2–0	3–2	0–0	—	—	—	0–1	2–0	—	—	—	0–1	—	1–2	2–0	—
Juventud	4–1	—	—	2–2	2–1	—	1–0	—	—	1–0	—	0–2	—	—	1–0	—
Liverpool	—	2–1	1–0	—	—	—	—	2–1	4–1	—	2–2	—	1–0	—	—	0–0
Miramar Misiones	—	1–1	—	1–0	—	1–2	—	—	0–1	—	1–3	—	0–1	1–1	—	3–0
Montevideo City Torque	—	—	—	1–1	0–1	2–4	—	—	—	—	1–0	—	1–1	2–3	—	2–1
Montevideo Wanderers	—	—	3–0	—	0–0	—	1–1	1–2	0–0	—	—	1–2	—	1–1	0–0	—
Nacional	—	4–0	—	2–0	2–1	1–2	—	—	—	3–1	—	1–1	1–1	—	—	3–3
Peñarol	1–1	3–1 (Note: Match abandoned after 63 minutes of play due to disturbances by Cerro fans.)	0–2	—	—	—	0–3	4–2	2–1	—	—	—	—	—	0–2	—
Plaza Colonia	0–1	—	—	1–2	1–2	0–0	—	—	—	2–0	—	1–0	—	—	0–1	—
Progreso	2–2	—	—	—	—	1–2	0–2	—	—	—	1–5	1–3	1–1	—	0–1	2–1
Racing	—	0–1	1–1	—	—	—	1–1	1–1	3–1	—	0–1	—	—	—	—	1–0
River Plate	0–2	—	—	1–0	0–1	1–0	—	—	—	0–1	—	1–1	1–2	—	—	—

Source: AUF, Soccerway
Legend: Blue = home team win; Yellow = draw; Red = away team win.

== Torneo Intermedio ==
The Torneo Intermedio, named "Mathías Acuña", was the second tournament of the 2025 season, played between the Apertura and Clausura tournaments. Although it consists of two groups whose composition depends on the final standings of the Torneo Apertura, a change in that composition was made starting from this season: the Apertura winners played in Serie A along with the teams placing 4th, 5th, 8th, 9th, 12th, 13th, and last in the Apertura, whilst the remaining teams played in Serie B, instead of having the teams in odd-numbered positions playing in Serie A and those in even-numbered positions playing in Serie B, as it had been played since its inception. The tournament started on 23 May and ended on 6 July, and the winners were assured of a berth into the 2026 Copa Sudamericana and the 2026 Supercopa Uruguaya.

=== Serie A ===
Pos	Team	Pld	W	D	L	GF	GA	GD	Pts	Qualification	PEÑ	DFS	WAN	PCO	LIV	CRR	RIV	CRL
1	Peñarol	7	5	1	1	15	5	+10	16	Advance to Torneo Intermedio Final	—	3–0	2–0	2–0	—	2–0	—	—
2	Defensor Sporting	7	4	2	1	12	10	+2	14		—	—	—	1–1	4–2	2–1	—	3–2
3	Montevideo Wanderers	7	3	3	1	6	5	+1	12		—	0–0	—	1–1	—	—	1–0	—
4	Plaza Colonia	7	1	5	1	6	7	−1	8		—	—	—	—	1–1	2–2	0–0	—
5	Liverpool	7	2	2	3	10	12	−2	8		3–2	—	1–2	—	—	0–0	—	2–1
6	Cerro	7	2	2	3	7	9	−2	8		—	—	1–2	—	—	—	1–0	2–1
7	River Plate	7	1	2	4	6	10	−4	5		1–3	1–2	—	—	2–1	—	—	—
8	Cerro Largo	7	0	3	4	7	11	−4	3		1–1	—	0–0	0–1	—	—	2–2	—

Source: AUF, Soccerway
Legend: Blue = home team win; Yellow = draw; Red = away team win.
Rules for classification: 1) Points, 2) Goal difference, 3) Goals for, 4) Head-to-head record, 5) Drawing of lots.

=== Serie B ===
Pos	Team	Pld	W	D	L	GF	GA	GD	Pts	Qualification	NAC	JUV	RAC	DAN	BOR	PRO	MCT	MIM
1	Nacional	7	7	0	0	16	6	+10	21	Advance to Torneo Intermedio Final	—	4–1	—	3–2	2–1	1–0	—	—
2	Juventud	7	5	0	2	14	11	+3	15		—	—	2–1	3–1	—	2–0	3–2	—
3	Racing	7	4	1	2	11	6	+5	13		1–2	—	—	—	2–0	3–0	1–1	—
4	Danubio	7	3	1	3	11	11	0	10		—	—	1–2	—	—	—	3–2	2–0
5	Boston River	7	2	1	4	8	12	−4	7		—	3–2	—	1–1	—	—	2–1	1–2
6	Progreso	7	2	0	5	4	10	−6	6		—	—	—	0–1	2–0	—	—	1–0
7	Montevideo City Torque	7	1	2	4	10	12	−2	5		1–2	—	—	—	—	3–1	—	0–0
8	Miramar Misiones	7	1	1	5	2	8	−6	4		0–2	0–1	0–1	—	—	—	—	—

Source: AUF, Soccerway
Legend: Blue = home team win; Yellow = draw; Red = away team win.
Rules for classification: 1) Points, 2) Goal difference, 3) Goals for, 4) Head-to-head record, 5) Drawing of lots.

=== Torneo Intermedio Final ===
6 July 2025
15:00 UTC−3

Peñarol	0–0 (a.e.t.)	Nacional
	Report
Penalties
Terans (penalty scored); Fernández (penalty scored); Léo Coelho (penalty scored); Muhlethaler (penalty scored); Umpiérrez (penalty scored)	5–3	(penalty missed) Carneiro; (penalty scored) Coates; (penalty scored) Boggio; (penalty scored) Mejía

Estadio Centenario, Montevideo
Referee: Esteban Ostojich

== Torneo Clausura ==
The Torneo Clausura, named "José Ignacio Villarreal", was the third and final tournament of the 2025 season. It began on 1 August and ended on 9 November 2025.

=== Standings ===
Pos	Team	Pld	W	D	L	GF	GA	GD	Pts	Qualification
1	Peñarol	15	11	2	2	30	12	+18	35	Advance to Championship playoff
2	Nacional (Note: Nacional were deducted three points as punishment for incidents by their fans in the Torneo Intermedio final against Peñarol.)	15	8	6	1	25	11	+14	27	
3	Montevideo City Torque	15	8	3	4	28	17	+11	27	
4	Boston River	15	6	8	1	26	10	+16	26	
5	Cerro Largo	15	7	4	4	19	14	+5	25	
6	Liverpool	15	7	4	4	19	16	+3	25	
7	Defensor Sporting	15	7	2	6	13	16	−3	23	
8	Cerro	15	7	3	5	13	13	0	24	
9	Danubio	15	6	3	6	18	13	+5	21	
10	Progreso	15	5	3	7	17	23	−6	18	
11	Racing	15	4	5	6	14	22	−8	17	
12	Juventud	15	4	4	7	8	13	−5	16	
13	River Plate	15	3	5	7	12	18	−6	14	
14	Miramar Misiones	15	3	4	8	17	26	−9	13	
15	Plaza Colonia	15	2	2	11	9	26	−17	8	
16	Montevideo Wanderers	15	1	4	10	7	25	−18	7	

Source: AUF, Soccerway
Rules for classification: 1) Points, 2) Playoff game (only if needed to decide first place between two teams), 3) Goal difference, 4) Goals for, 5) Head-to-head record, 6) Drawing of lots, 7) Playoff game, only if two teams are still tied for first place.

=== Results ===
Home \ Away	BOR	CRR	CRL	DAN	DFS	JUV	LIV	MIM	MCT	WAN	NAC	PEÑ	PCO	PRO	RAC	RIV
Boston River	—	—	—	0–0	4–0	0–0	—	—	—	—	—	2–1	6–1	2–1	—	2–0
Cerro	0–0	—	0–1	—	1–0	—	2–1	1–0	—	—	0–0	2–0	—	—	1–2	—
Cerro Largo	2–2	—	—	1–0	1–0	—	2–0	—	—	0–1	—	1–3	—	—	2–2	—
Danubio	—	5–1	—	—	—	2–1	—	2–3	2–0	—	0–0	—	2–0	—	—	0–1
Defensor Sporting	—	—	—	2–1	—	1–0	—	—	0–1	2–1	1–1	—	1–0	—	—	1–0
Juventud	—	1–0	0–2	—	—	—	—	2–1	0–1	—	0–0	—	0–2	1–1	—	1–2
Liverpool	2–1	—	—	0–0	2–0	0–1	—	—	—	2–1	—	2–2	—	3–1	2–2	—
Miramar Misiones	0–4	—	1–1	—	0–0	—	0–1	—	—	3–0	—	2–2	—	—	0–2	—
Montevideo City Torque	1–1	1–2	1–0	—	—	—	1–1	3–0	—	2–2	—	0–2	—	—	4–0	—
Montevideo Wanderers	2–2	0–1	—	0–2	—	0–1	—	—	—	—	0–0	—	0–0	—	—	0–4
Nacional	0–0	—	2–1	—	—	—	3–1	3–1	5–2	—	—	—	—	3–1	3–0	—
Peñarol	—	—	—	2–0	2–1	1–0	—	—	—	3–0	3–0	—	1–0	2–1	—	2–0
Plaza Colonia	—	0–2	0–2	—	—	—	0–1	1–3	2–4	—	1–2	—	—	0–1	—	1–1
Progreso	—	2–0	1–2	1–0	2–3	—	—	3–2	0–5	2–0	—	—	—	—	—	—
Racing	0–0	—	—	1–2	0–1	0–0	—	—	—	1–0	—	1–4	0–1	0–0	—	—
River Plate	—	0–0	1–1	—	—	—	0–1	1–1	0–2	—	0–3	—	—	0–0	2–3	—

Source: AUF, Soccerway
Legend: Blue = home team win; Yellow = draw; Red = away team win.

== Aggregate table ==
Pos	Team	Pld	W	D	L	GF	GA	GD	Pts	Qualification
1	Nacional (Note: Nacional were deducted three points as punishment for incidents by their fans in the Torneo Intermedio final against Peñarol.) (C)	37	24	10	3	76	33	+43	79	Advance to Championship playoff and qualification for Copa Libertadores group stage
2	Peñarol	37	24	6	7	66	34	+32	78	Advance to Championship playoff and qualification for Copa Libertadores group stage
3	Liverpool	37	18	11	8	51	37	+14	65	Advance to Championship playoff and qualification for Copa Libertadores second stage
4	Juventud	37	18	7	12	45	39	+6	61	Qualification for Copa Libertadores first stage (Note: Since the Copa Uruguay and Torneo Intermedio winners, Peñarol, qualified for the Copa Libertadores on league performance, their Copa Libertadores first stage and Copa Sudamericana first stage berths were passed to the aggregate table's highest-placed teams not already qualified for either South American competition.)
5	Defensor Sporting	37	18	7	12	42	38	+4	61	Qualification for Copa Sudamericana first stage
6	Boston River	37	14	13	10	50	39	+11	55	Qualification for Copa Sudamericana first stage
7	Racing	37	14	11	12	39	38	+1	53	Qualification for Copa Sudamericana first stage
8	Montevideo City Torque	37	13	10	14	54	51	+3	49	Qualification for Copa Sudamericana first stage
9	Cerro Largo	37	12	13	12	41	41	0	49	
10	Cerro (Note: Cerro were deducted one point as punishment for the abandonment of their Torneo Apertura match against Peñarol.)	37	12	11	14	33	42	−9	46	
11	Danubio	37	10	13	14	41	41	0	43	
12	Progreso	37	10	9	18	38	60	−22	39	
13	Plaza Colonia	37	8	11	18	28	46	−18	35	
14	Montevideo Wanderers	37	6	13	18	25	47	−22	31	
15	River Plate	37	6	11	20	28	48	−20	29	
16	Miramar Misiones	37	7	8	22	35	58	−23	29	

Source: AUF
Rules for classification: 1) Points, 2) Playoff game (only if needed to decide first place between two teams), 3) Goal difference, 4) Goals for, 5) Head-to-head record, 6) Drawing of lots, 7) Playoff game, only if two teams are still tied for first place.
(C) Champions

== Championship playoff ==
The Torneo Apertura and Torneo Clausura winners (Liverpool and Peñarol, respectively) played a semi-final match, while the top team in the aggregate table (Nacional) received a bye to the finals. The championship playoff finalists qualified for the Copa Libertadores group stage.

Semi-final		Finals
		Peñarol	2	0	2
Liverpool	1	Nacional (a.e.t.)	2	1	3
Peñarol (a.e.t.)	2

=== Semi-final ===
16 November 2025
18:00 UTC−3

Liverpool	1–2 (a.e.t.)	Peñarol
A. Hernández 92'	Report	García 103'; Fernández 115' (pen.)

Estadio Centenario, Montevideo
Referee: Andrés Matonte

=== Finals ===
23 November 2025
16:30 UTC−3

Peñarol	2–2	Nacional
Arezo 45+5'; Fernández 54'	Report	De los Santos 10'; Carneiro 37'

Estadio Campeón del Siglo, Montevideo
Referee: Javier Burgos

30 November 2025
16:30 UTC−3

Nacional	1–0 (a.e.t.)	Peñarol
Ebere 114'	Report

Estadio Gran Parque Central, Montevideo
Referee: Gustavo Tejera

Nacional won 3–2 on aggregate.

Liga AUF Uruguaya
2025 champions

50th title

== Top scorers ==
Rank	Player	Club	Goals
1	(Uruguay) Abel Hernández	Liverpool	25
2	(Uruguay) Nicolás López	Nacional	21
3	(Uruguay) Agustín Rodríguez	Juventud	18
4	(Uruguay) José Neris	Montevideo City Torque	16
5	(Uruguay) Maximiliano Silvera	Peñarol	12
6	(Uruguay) Leonardo Fernández	Peñarol	11
7	(United States) Agustin Anello	Boston River	10
7	(Uruguay) Franco Rossi	Cerro Largo	10
9	(Uruguay) Sebastián Fernández	Danubio	9
9	(Uruguay) Enzo Larrosa	Cerro	9
9	(Uruguay) Matías Arezo	Peñarol	9

Source: AUF

== Relegation ==
Relegation was determined at the end of the season by computing an average of the total of points earned per game over the two most recent seasons: 2024 and 2025. The three teams with the lowest average at the end of the season were relegated to the Segunda División for the following season.

Pos	Team	2024 Pts	2025 Pts	Total Pts	Total Pld	Avg	Relegation
1	Peñarol	93	78	171	74	2.311	
2	Nacional	86	79	165	74	2.23	
3	Juventud	—	61	61	37	1.649	
4	Defensor Sporting	59	61	120	74	1.622	
5	Boston River	60	55	115	74	1.554	
6	Racing	52	53	105	74	1.419	
7	Liverpool	39	65	104	74	1.405	
8	Cerro Largo	54	49	103	74	1.392	
9	Montevideo City Torque	—	49	49	37	1.324	
10	Danubio	53	43	96	74	1.297	
11	Cerro	39	46	85	74	1.149	
12	Montevideo Wanderers	48	31	79	74	1.068	
13	Progreso	40	39	79	74	1.068	
14	Plaza Colonia (R)	—	35	35	37	0.946	Relegation to Segunda División
15	River Plate (R)	40	29	69	74	0.932	Relegation to Segunda División
16	Miramar Misiones (R)	40	29	69	74	0.932	Relegation to Segunda División

Source: AUF

== See also ==
- 2025 Uruguayan Segunda División season
- 2025 Copa Uruguay
