= Javier Méndez =

Javier Méndez may refer to:

- Javier Méndez (baseball) (born 1964), Cuban baseball player
- Javier Méndez (Chilean footballer)
- Javier Méndez (footballer, born 1982), Uruguayan defender/midfielder
- Javier Méndez (footballer, born 1994), Uruguayan midfielder
- Javier Francisco Méndez (born 1972), Mexican boxer
- Javier Mendez (mixed martial arts trainer), Mexican mixed martial arts trainer
