= Ignacio Ordóñez =

Ignacio Ordóñez may refer to:

- Ignacio Ordóñez (football manager), Uruguayan football manager
- Ignacio Ordóñez (wrestler), Spanish wrestler
