= Franco Rossi (footballer) =

Uruguayan footballer

Personal information
- Full name: Franco Andrés Rossi Donazar
- Date of birth: 26 June 2002 (age 24)
- Place of birth: Pando, Uruguay
- Height: 1.78 m (5 ft 10 in)
- Position: Forward

Team information
- Current team: Chapecoense (on loan from Toluca)
- Number: 29

Youth career
- 2015–2020: Rentistas
- 2021–2022: Montevideo City Torque

Senior career*
| Years | Team | Apps | (Gls) |
| 2023–2024 | Montevideo City Torque | 0 | (0) |
| 2023–2024 | → Tacuarembó (loan) | 49 | (7) |
| 2025 | Cerro Largo | 31 | (10) |
| 2026– | Toluca | 12 | (1) |
| 2026– | → Chapecoense (loan) | 0 | (0) |
- * Club domestic league appearances and goals as of 15:46, 3 August 2026 (UTC)

Franco Andrés Rossi Donazar (born 26 June 2002) is a Uruguayan footballer who plays as a forward for Campeonato Brasileiro Série A side Chapecoense, on loan from Liga MX club Toluca.

== Career ==
Born in Pando, Rossi began his career with Rentistas before joining the youth categories of Montevideo City Torque for the 2021 season. In 2023, he was loaned to Segunda División side Tacuarembó, where he made his senior debut.

In 2025, Rossi signed a permanent deal with Cerro Largo and immediately became a starter. On 14 January 2026, he moved abroad for the first time in his career, being announced at Liga MX side Toluca.

On 29 July 2026, after failing to establish himself as a starter, Rossi was loaned to Chapecoense of the Campeonato Brasileiro Série A, until the end of the year.

== Career statistics ==
As of 3 August 2026.

| Club | Season | League | | | Cup | | Continental | | Total | |
| Club | Season | Division | Apps | Goals | Apps | Goals | Apps | Goals | Apps | Goals |
|---|---|---|---|---|---|---|---|---|---|---|
| Tacuarembó | 2023 | Segunda División | 21 | 2 | 0 | 0 | — | | 21 | 2 |
| Tacuarembó | 2024 | Segunda División | 28 | 5 | — | | — | | 28 | 5 |
| Tacuarembó | Total | | 49 | 5 | 0 | 0 | — | | 49 | 5 |
| Cerro Largo | 2025 | Liga AUF Uruguaya | 31 | 10 | 2 | 0 | 5 (Note: Appearance(s) in Copa Sudamericana) | 0 | 38 | 10 |
| Toluca | 2025–26 | Liga MX | 12 | 1 | 0 | 0 | 2 (Note: Appearance(s) in CONCACAF Champions Cup) | 0 | 14 | 1 |
| Chapecoense (loan) | 2026 | Série A | 0 | 0 | 0 | 0 | — | | 0 | 0 |
| Career total | | | 92 | 16 | 2 | 0 | 7 | 0 | 101 | 16 |
