= Jairo Coronel =

Uruguayan footballer

Personal information
- Full name: Jairo Nicolás Coronel Valdez
- Date of birth: 4 March 1996 (age 30)
- Place of birth: Montevideo, Uruguay
- Height: 1.89 m (6 ft 2 in)
- Position: Defensive midfielder

Team information
- Current team: Huracán FC

Youth career
- 2013–2015: River Plate Montevideo
- 2015–2016: Rentistas

Senior career*
Years	Team	Apps	(Gls)
2015–2016	Rentistas	0	(0)
2016–2017	Boston River	0	(0)
2018–2021	Uruguay Montevideo	64	(2)
2022	Miramar Misiones	15	(1)
2022	→ Atenas (loan)	8	(0)
2023	Cerro	19	(0)
2024	Cerro Largo	9	(0)
2024	Miramar Misiones	7	(0)
2025	Deportes Copiapó	18	(1)
2026–	Huracán FC	0	(0)
- * Club domestic league appearances and goals as of 1 May 2025

Jairo Nicolás Coronel Valdez (born 4 March 1996) is a Uruguayan professional footballer who plays as a defensive midfielder for Huracán FC.

== Club career ==
As a youth player, Coronel was with River Plate de Montevideo and Rentistas. After a stint with Boston River, he made his senior debut with Uruguay Montevideo in 2018, spending four seasons with them until 2021. In 2022, he played for Miramar Misiones and Atenas de San Carlos.

In 2023, Coronel signed with Cerro in the Uruguayan Primera División. The next year, he played for Cerro Largo, with whom he took part in the Copa Sudamericana, and Miramar Misiones.

In 2025, Coronel moved to Chile and signed with Deportes Copiapó alongside his compatriot Briam Acosta.

Back to Uruguay, Coronel joined Huracán FC in January 2026.

=== Controversies ===
On 1 November 2025, Coronel was arrested by assaulting Ernesto Lorca, a technical staff member of Universidad de Concepción, in the last matchday of the 2025 Primera B de Chile in the context of the Chilean violence in stadiums law.
