= Ignacio Ordóñez (football manager) =

Uruguayan football manager (born 1985)

Personal information
- Full name: José Ignacio Battle Ordóñez de los Campos
- Date of birth: 22 January 1985 (age 41)
- Place of birth: Montevideo, Uruguay

Managerial career
- Years: Team
- 2009: El Tanque Sisley (youth)
- 2010–2011: El Tanque Sisley (assistant)
- 2012: Albion
- 2012–2013: Cerrito (youth)
- 2013: Cerrito
- 2013: Racing Montevideo (assistant)
- 2014: Elbio Fernández
- 2015: Racing Montevideo (youth)
- 2015: Racing Montevideo (assistant)
- 2015: Racing Montevideo (interim)
- 2016: Nacional Montevideo (youth)
- 2017: River Plate Montevideo (youth)
- 2018: Cerrito (youth)
- 2018–2019: Cerrito
- 2020: Albion
- 2021: Colón FC (interim)
- 2022: Cerro Largo (assistant)
- 2023: Cerro Largo
- 2023–2026: Cerro Largo (assistant)
- 2026: Cerro Largo (interim)
- 2026: Cerro Largo

José Ignacio Battle Ordóñez de los Campos (born 22 January 1985) is a Uruguayan football manager.

== Career ==
Born in Montevideo, Ordóñez began his career as a youth coach of El Tanque Sisley in 2009, moving to the role of assistant manager of the main squad in the following year. He had his first managerial experience in 2012, while in charge of Albion.

Ordóñez subsequently moved to Cerrito, being in charge of the youth sides and also acting as an interim manager of the main squad in 2013, before being confirmed as manager until the end of the season on 21 May of that year. On 4 April 2014, he was appointed manager of amateur side Club Elbio Fernández Universitario.

In 2015, Ordóñez moved to Racing Montevideo; initially in charge of the youth teams, he became an assistant of the main squad in April after the appointment of Santiago Ostolaza, and later became an interim in September after Ostolaza left. He subsequently worked as a youth manager of Nacional Montevideo, River Plate Montevideo and Cerrito.

On 15 May 2018, Ordóñez was named interim manager of Cerrito, after Gustavo Israel resigned. He was later confirmed as manager for the remainder of the year and for the 2019 season, but was sacked on 26 August 2019.

Ordóñez returned to Albion on 3 February 2020, but was dismissed on 3 October. He subsequently took a sporting director role at Colón FC, being an interim of the main squad in August 2021.

Ordóñez later joined Cerro Largo, being an assistant of Danielo Núñez and Mario Saralegui before moving to an institutional manager role. On 3 July 2023, he was appointed manager of the club, after Eduardo Espinel resigned, but was sacked on 16 November, later returning to his assistant role.

On 18 May 2026, Ordóñez was again appointed manager of Cerro Largo, replacing departing Núñez, returning to his previous role in August after Núñez returned. Again named in charge on 5 September, he was sacked exactly one month later.
