= Diego Franco =

Diego Franco may refer to:

- Diego Franco (football manager) (born 1989), Uruguayan football manager
- Diego Franco (footballer) (born 1992), Mexican footballer
