= Saviniano Pérez =

Uruguayan politician (1907–1985)

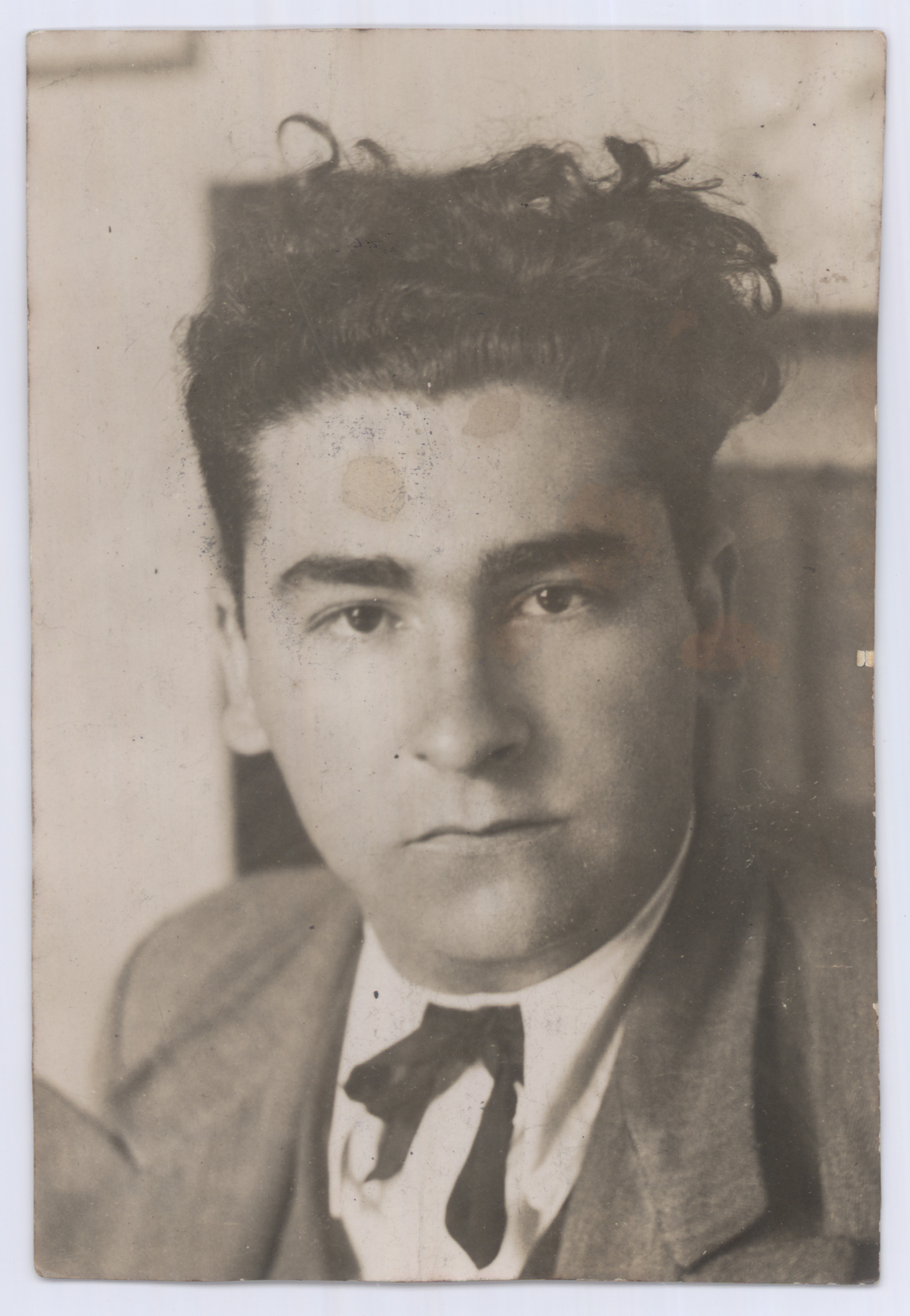

Saviniano Pérez known as "Nano Perez" (1907, Melo –1985) was a Uruguayan politician and member of the National Party.

== Bibliography ==
- Domínguez, Carlos María (2004). El norte profundo. Montevideo: Ediciones de la Banda Oriental. (in Spanish)
