= Federico Macías =

Uruguayan football manager

Personal information
- Full name: Federico Macías García
- Date of birth: 24 January 1996 (age 30)
- Place of birth: Uruguay

Team information
- Current team: Albion (manager)

Youth career
- Years: Team
- Plaza Colonia

Managerial career
- 2019–2020: Montevideo Wanderers (youth)
- 2021–2022: Plaza Colonia (youth)
- 2022: Nacional de Nueva Helvecia
- 2023–2024: Montevideo City Torque (youth)
- 2025: Albion (youth)
- 2025–2026: Atlético Juanicó
- 2026: Albion (reserves)
- 2026–: Albion

Federico Macías García (born 24 January 1996) is a Uruguayan football manager, currently in charge of Albion along with Diego Franco.

== Career ==
After playing for Plaza Colonia as a youth, Macías began working as an under-14 manager at Montevideo Wanderers in 2019. After taking over the under-15s in the following year, he returned to Plaza Colonia in 2021, before taking over the under-14 squad of Montevideo City Torque in 2023 and also having his first senior experience with Nacional de Nueva Helvecia the previous year.

Macías joined Albion in 2025, also as an under-14 manager, while also being in charge of Atlético Juanicó. On 30 September 2026, he was appointed manager of the first team along with Diego Franco, until the end of the year.
