= Briam Acosta =

Uruguayan footballer (born 1997)

Personal information
- Full name: Briam Eduardo Acosta Arellano
- Date of birth: 7 September 1997 (age 29)
- Place of birth: Treinta y Tres, Uruguay
- Height: 1.78 m (5 ft 10 in)
- Position: Midfielder

Team information
- Current team: Deportes Copiapó
- Number: 18

Youth career
- San Lorenzo 33
- 2015–2017: Juventud Las Piedras

Senior career*
Years	Team	Apps	(Gls)
2017–2018	Juventud Las Piedras	38	(5)
2019–2021	Danubio	40	(3)
2020	→ Atenas (loan)	9	(0)
2021–2022	Atenas	31	(2)
2023	Rampla Juniors	31	(2)
2024	Cerro Largo	19	(0)
2024	Deportivo Maldonado	8	(0)
2025–	Deportes Copiapó	8	(2)
- * Club domestic league appearances and goals as of 2 May 2025

Briam Eduardo Acosta Arellano (born 7 September 1997) is a Uruguayan professional footballer who plays as a midfielder for Chilean club Deportes Copiapó.

== Club career ==
As a youth player, Acosta was with San Lorenzo de Treinta y Tres and Juventud de Las Piedras. He made his senior debut with Juventud in the 0–3 loss against Nacional on 19 August 2017.

In 2019, Acosta signed with Danubio in the Uruguayan Primera División and was loaned out to Atenas de San Carlos in the second half of 2020. Out of Danubio, he rejoined Atenas in 2021 and switched to Rampla Juniors in 2023. During 2024, he played for Cerro Largo and Deportivo Maldonado.

In 2025, Acosta moved to Chile and signed with Deportes Copiapó alongside his compatriot Jairo Coronel.
