= Nathan Lozada =

Australian footballer

Personal information
- Full name: Nathan Jarod Lozada Petosevic
- Date of birth: 21 June 1999 (age 27)
- Place of birth: Sydney, Australia
- Position: Forward

Team information
- Current team: Weston Bears

Youth career
- Northern Tigers
- 2014–2017: Central Coast Mariners

Senior career*
Years	Team	Apps	(Gls)
2017	CCM Academy	2	(0)
2018–2020	Albion	5	(0)
2021–	Weston Bears	12	(1)
- * Club domestic league appearances and goals as of 11 November 2021 ‡ National team caps and goals as of 15 December 2018

Nathan Lozada (born 21 June 1999) is an Australian professional footballer who plays as a forward for Weston Bears.
