= Cristian Jaime =

Argentine footballer (born 2006)

- Jaime in 2025.

Personal information
- Full name: Cristian Leonel Jaime
- Date of birth: 14 July 2006 (age 20)
- Place of birth: Tigre, Buenos Aires
- Height: 1.76 m (5 ft 9 1/2 in)
- Position: Forward

Team information
- Current team: Peñarol (on loan from River Plate)
- Number: 11

Youth career
- Club Juventud de Tigre
- Deportivo Armenio
- Club Rincón
- 2017–2026: River Plate

Senior career*
Years	Team	Apps	(Gls)
2025–	River Plate	3	(0)
2026–	→ Peñarol (loan)	19	(5)
- * Club domestic league appearances and goals as of 22:20, 19 November 2026 (UTC)

Cristian Leonel Jaime (born 14 July 2006) is an Argentine professional association football player who plays as a left winger for Uruguayan Primera División club Peñarol, on loan from Argentine Primera División club River Plate. Jaime can also play as an attacking midfielder.

== Career ==
=== Early career ===
Jaime was born on July 14, 2006, on Tigre, Argentina. He began playing football when he was 5 years old at Club Juventud de Tigre, usually accompanied by his grandmother Elvira. Later, he played for Deportivo Armenio and then Club Rincón, where he was scouted from Club Atlético River Plate.

=== River Plate ===
River Plate's scouts called him up for a single trial, where he played as an attacking midfielder and immediately impressed the coaches. This led to his entry into River's youth academy, where he shared a team with players like Claudio Echeverri and Agustín Ruberto. In his early years at the club, he often came off the bench or played in the Metropolitan League, which allowed him to gain experience and adapt to different positions in the midfield.

Jaime debuted for River Plate's reserve team in 2024, under the management of Marcelo Escudero. During the 2025 season, he established himself as an undisputed starter, becoming the team's most dynamic player. After months of negotiations on October 10, 2025, he officially signed his first professional contract with Club Atlético River Plate, valid until December 31, 2028, with a €100 million release clause.

On October 12, 2025, He made his professional debut under Marcelo Gallardo's leadership in the match against Sarmiento de Junín in the 2025 Torneo Clausura.

Jaime inherited the number 30, which had previously been worn by Franco Mastantuono before his transfer to Real Madrid.

==== Loan to Peñarol ====
In 2026, he was loaned to Club Atlético Peñarol of the Liga AUF Uruguaya. A twelve-month loan with no option to buy was agreed upon.

He made his debut on July 12 2026, in the 1-1 draw against Racing de Montevideo, a match in which he left a good impression, entering as a starter in the following match against Boston River, where he would put in a great performance, making an assist and leaving applauded by Peñarol fans

== Style of play ==
Jaime primarily plays as a left winger, although he can also play as an attacking midfielder or right winger. Left-footed, fast, and unpredictable, his main strength is his individual skill: he excels in one-on-one situations and is known for his dribbling skills when he has open space. He also stands out for his pressing and his ability to win back possession. Jaime described himself as "skillful, fast, and strong in one-on-one situations," adding that he is "a hard worker when pressing." He cited Esequiel Barco and Ángel Di María as his role models.

== Honours ==
Peñarol

- Torneo Intermedio: 2026

Individual

- 2026 Torneo Intermedio Final MVP
