= Posta del Chuy =

Coordinates: 32°22′57.28″S 54°1′46.65″W

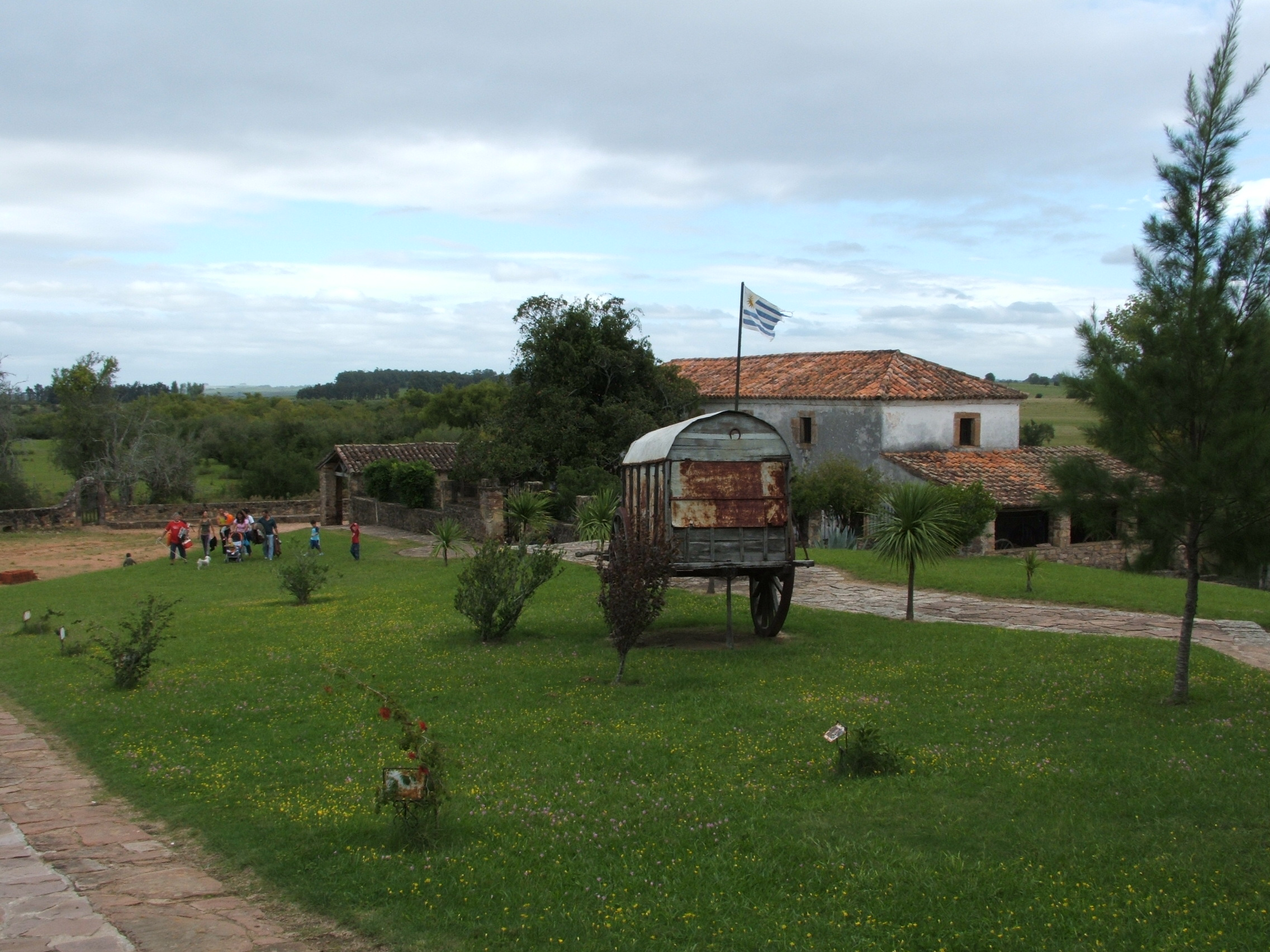
Old Posta del Chuy

The old Posta del Chuy is a historic inn situated 12 kilometres (7.5 mi) away from Melo, Cerro Largo, Uruguay.

== History ==
The inn was intended for travelers going by diligence from Melo to Villa Artigas (now Río Branco).

Built in 1855 by two Basque men named Etcheverry, the solid stone building is unique in South America.

=== Heritage ===
Historian Horacio Arredondo promoted the restoration of the building and bridge. It has been declared a site of National Heritage. The history of its construction is described in "Los árboles de piedra" by Andrés Echevarría.
