= William Leslie Poole =

English teacher and football administrator

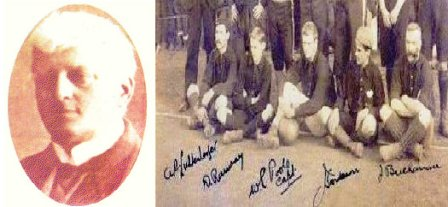
- Father of Uruguayan Football
- Born: 7 November 1866; Bromley, Kent
- Died: 22 August 1931 (aged 64); Montevideo, Uruguay
- Occupation(s): Teacher and Sport management
- Spouse: Ethel Maude Poole

William Leslie Poole (England, 7 November 1866 – Montevideo, 22 August 1931) was a Kent-born English immigrant to Uruguay who was important to the development of association football in Uruguay and became known as the "Father of Uruguayan Football."

== Early life ==
Poole was married to Ethel Maude Poole, who was born in England and died on 21 December 1916 in Montevideo, Uruguay. Poole was a Cavendish College, Cambridge graduate who immigrated to Uruguay in 1885 to work as an English teacher at the English High School of Montevideo, where he was active until 1920.

== Uruguayan football ==
By the time of his arrival, there were already some clubs practicing football informally in Uruguay such as the Montevideo Cricket Club, founded in 1861 (the first rugby club outside the United Kingdom), and the Montevideo Rowing Club, founded in 1874.

In his spare time, Poole devoted his energy to disseminating and organising the sport in Uruguay.

Henry Candid Lichtenberger, an 18-year-old man who was Poole's disciple, founded the first Uruguayan football team on 2 June 1886, the Club Albion. In its original statute, the Albion did not accept foreign players. The Football Association was characterised by having, as the major part of its associates, Uruguayan-born children of The English.

Poole's legacy was to organise and professionalise the sport in Uruguay. Unlike Lichtenberger, Poole required the participation of both nationals and foreigners with no distinction of race, language, religion, political opinion or economic position. This mindset was incorporated into Uruguay's mentality.

Poole also acted not only as a player – being a frontline for the Uruguay National Team – but also as a referee and as the President of the Uruguayan Association Football League, founded on 30 March 1900, a precursor of today’s Uruguayan Football Association (Asociación Uruguaya de Fútbol – AUF).

Poole also practiced rowing, cricket and rugby union, but his real passion was association football. In his free time, he used to take his students to practice in the Montevideo neighborhood of Punta Carretas, close to the current location of a shopping center.

The Montevideo city hall paid honour to Poole by dedicating a place called "Espacio Libre William Leslie Poole" between Constituyente and Vásquez avenues in the Uruguayan capital.
