= Pablo de Ambrosio =

Uruguayan football manager (born 1981)

Personal information
- Full name: Pablo Sebastián de Ambrosio Olivera
- Date of birth: 16 May 1981 (age 45)
- Place of birth: Montevideo, Uruguay
- Position: Forward

Team information
- Current team: Cerrito (manager)

Youth career
- Years: Team
- Central Español

Managerial career
- 2023–2024: Central Español (youth)
- 2024: Central Español (assistant)
- 2024–2026: Central Español
- 2026–: Cerrito

Pablo Sebastián de Ambrosio Olivera (born 16 May 1981) is a Uruguayan football manager, currently in charge of Cerrito.

== Career ==
Born in Montevideo, de Ambrosio played for the youth categories of Central Español, but retired before making a professional debut. The son of Agustín de Ambrosio, a former president of the club, he started to manage the under-19 team in 2023.

De Ambrosio was an assistant of the main squad for a brief period in 2024, before being appointed manager of the club in the Primera División Amateur on 24 December of that year. He led the club to a promotion to the Segunda División, before achieving a second consecutive promotion to the Primera División – Central returned to the top tier after 12 years – in the 2025 season.

In November 2025, de Ambrosio was confirmed as manager of Central for the 2026 campaign. On 9 May of that year, however, he was sacked, and took over Cerrito on 18 June.
