= Javier Francisco Méndez =

Mexican boxer (born 1972)

Javier Francisco Méndez Torres (born September 23, 1972 in Bacobampo, Sonora) is a Mexican former professional boxer who competed from 1993 to 2005. He held the WBC FECARBOX welterweight title and challenged for the WBF super lightweight title, both in 1998.

== Professional career ==
Méndez won Sinaloa State welterweight championship, when he beat Antonio Contreras in Mexico.

On June 27, 1998 Méndez lost to three-time world champion, Antonio Margarito in El Gran Mercado, Phoenix, Arizona.

In August 1998, Méndez won the WBC FECARBOX light welterweight by upsetting title contender Eric Hernandez. He would go on to lose his title to Fitz Vanderpool.

On November 19, 1998, Méndez challenged Ricky Quiles for the vacant WBF super lightweight title at the Reseda Country Club, losing via majority decision.
