= Juan Manuel Martínez (Uruguayan footballer) =

Uruguayan football manager

Personal information
- Full name: Juan Manuel Martínez Jourdan
- Date of birth: 21 January 1981 (age 45)
- Place of birth: Montevideo, Uruguay
- Height: 1.76 m (5 ft 9 in)
- Position: Defender

Team information
- Current team: Montevideo Wanderers (reserves manager)

Youth career
- Montevideo Wanderers

Senior career*
Years	Team	Apps	(Gls)
2000–2007	Montevideo Wanderers	61	(1)

Managerial career
- 2022–2025: Montevideo Wanderers (reserves)
- 2024: Montevideo Wanderers (interim)
- 2025: Montevideo Wanderers (interim)
- 2025: Montevideo Wanderers
- 2025–: Montevideo Wanderers (reserves)
- * Club domestic league appearances and goals

Juan Manuel Martínez Jourdan (born 21 January 1981) is a Uruguayan football manager and former player who played as a defender. He is the current manager of Montevideo Wanderers' reserve team.

== Career ==
Born in Montevideo, Martínez was a product of Montevideo Wanderers' youth categories, making his senior debut in 2000. After retiring in 2007, he remained at the club working as a institutional manager.

On 8 March 2024, Martínez was named interim manager of Wanderers, after Alejandro Cappuccio was sacked. He returned to his previous role four days later, after a 0–0 home draw against Deportivo Maldonado.

On 6 March 2025, Martínez was again appointed interim, after the dismissal of Antonio Pacheco. Thirteen days later, after one win and one draw in two matches, he was permanently named manager of the side, but returned to his previous role in the youth sides on 2 May.
