= Diego Franco (football manager) =

Uruguayan football manager

Personal information
- Full name: Diego Franco Peraza
- Date of birth: 12 April 1989 (age 37)
- Place of birth: Uruguay

Team information
- Current team: Albion (manager)

Managerial career
- Years: Team
- 2017: Atlético Juanicó
- 2018–2019: Montevideo Wanderers (youth)
- 2021: Rentistas (assistant)
- 2021–2022: Montevideo City Torque (assistant)
- 2022: Villa Española
- 2023–2024: Deportes Temuco (assistant)
- 2024–2025: Uruguay U17 (women)
- 2024: Atlético Juanicó
- 2026: Defensor Sporting (assistant)
- 2026: Albion (youth)
- 2026–: Albion

Diego Franco Peraza (born 12 April 1989) is a Uruguayan football manager, currently in charge of Albion along with Federico Macías.

== Career ==
Franco worked as an analyst at CE Europa's youth sides before having his first managerial experience with amateur side Atlético Juanicó in 2017. He later coached the under-17 and under-19 sides of Montevideo Wanderers, and was a tactical analyst at Liverpool Montevideo before becoming an assistant of Martín Varini at Rentistas in April 2021.

In May 2022, after another period as an assistant of Román Cuello at Montevideo City Torque, Franco was appointed manager of Segunda División side Villa Española, replacing Julio Mozzo, but resigned in June due to personal reasons. In June 2023, he reunited with Cuello at Chilean side Deportes Temuco.

Franco left Temuco with Cuello in May 2024, and took over the Uruguay women's national under-17 team in September. He left the latter on 3 December 2025, and reunited with Cuello roughly one month later, at Defensor Sporting.

After departing Defensor with Cuello in May 2026, Franco joined Albion in the following month to work in the youth categories. On 30 September, he was appointed manager of the first team along with Federico Macías, until the end of the year.
