= Estadio Arquitecto Antonio Eleuterio Ubilla =

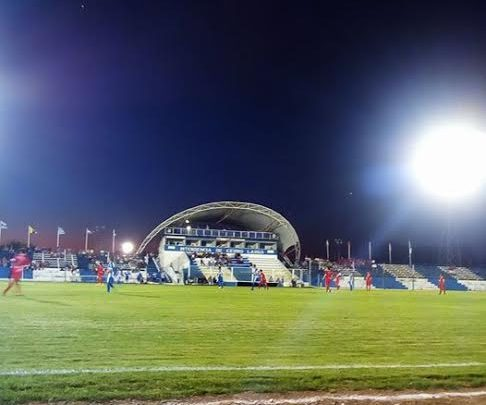
- Interactive map of Estadio Arquitecto Antonio Eleuterio Ubilla
- Location: Melo, Uruguay
- Coordinates: 32°21′34.95″S 54°10′9.58″W
- Owner: Cerro Largo Department
- Capacity: 9,000
- Surface: grass

Construction
- Opened: 1942
- Renovated: 1990

Tenant
- Cerro Largo FC

Estadio Arquitecto Antonio Eleuterio Ubilla is a multi-use stadium in Melo, Uruguay. It is currently used primarily for football matches and serves as the home stadium for Cerro Largo FC of the Primera División Uruguaya. The stadium holds 9,000 spectators.
