= Cristian Chambian =

Uruguayan football manager

Personal information
- Full name: Cristian Rodolfo Chambian Aires
- Date of birth: 5 August 1990 (age 36)
- Place of birth: Montevideo, Uruguay

Team information
- Current team: Racing Montevideo (manager)

Managerial career
- Years: Team
- 2020–2021: Racing Montevideo (youth)
- 2021–2025: Racing Montevideo (assistant)
- 2025: Racing Montevideo (interim)
- 2025–: Racing Montevideo

Cristian Rodolfo Chambian Aires (born 5 August 1990) is a Uruguayan football manager, currently in charge of Racing Montevideo.

== Career ==
Born in Montevideo, Chambian joined hometown side Racing Montevideo in 2020, as an assistant coach of the youth sides. In 2021, he was named assistant coach of the main squad.

On 17 February 2025, Chambian was appointed interim manager of Racing, after Darío Rodríguez was sacked. Assisted by Gonzalo Aguilar, the duo won 3–1 over Montevideo City Torque four days later, leading the club to their first win of the season.

Chambian led Racing to a further four wins in the following five matches, including a 4–2 win over Montevideo Wanderers which qualified the club to the 2025 Copa Sudamericana group stage and an 1–0 away win over Peñarol. In March 2025, he was confirmed as manager of the club by president Washington Lizandro.

On 24 November 2025, after qualifying the club to the 2026 Copa Sudamericana, Chambian renewed his contract for a further year.
