= Federico Nieves =

Uruguayan football manager (born 1980)

Personal information
- Full name: Federico Nieves García
- Date of birth: 14 January 1980 (age 46)
- Place of birth: Uruguay

Managerial career
- Years: Team
- 2013: Racing Montevideo (youth)
- 2019: Albion
- 2020: Montevideo Wanderers (youth)
- 2021–2022: Montevideo City Torque (youth)
- 2024: Defensor Sporting (assistant)
- 2024–2025: Cooper
- 2026: Albion

Federico Nieves García (born 14 January 1980) is a Uruguayan football manager.

== Career ==
Nieves began his career as a manager of clubs in the Liga Universitaria de Deportes, an amateur competition. He managed the under-17 side of Racing Montevideo before returning to the LUD, and led another three teams in the competition before being named manager of Segunda División side Albion for the 2019 season.

After leaving Albion in December 2019, Nieves worked as an under-17 manager at Montevideo Wanderers and under-19 manager at Montevideo City Torque before moving to Defensor Sporting in December 2023, as an assistant of Martín Varini. In September 2024, he took over Cooper in the second division.

Despite being unable to avoid relegation, Nieves remained at Cooper for the 2025 season, but departed on 7 August of that year. On 3 December 2025, he returned to Albion, with the club now in the Primera División.

On 29 September 2026, after losing eight matches in the Clausura tournament, Nieves was sacked.
