= Raúl Salazar =

Uruguayan football manager

Personal information
- Full name: Raúl Alejandro Salazar Carrancio
- Date of birth: 20 August 1974 (age 52)
- Place of birth: Montevideo, Uruguay
- Height: 1.74 m (5 ft 9 in)
- Position: Midfielder

Team information
- Current team: River Plate Montevideo (manager)

Youth career
- River Plate Montevideo

Senior career*
| Years | Team | Apps | (Gls) |
| 1994–1998 | River Plate Montevideo | | |
| 1999 | Aucas | | |
| 2000 | River Plate Montevideo | | |
| 2001 | Aucas | 10 | (1) |
| 2002–2003 | Racing Montevideo | | |
| 2004–2005 | LDU Portoviejo | | |
| 2005 | 3 de Febrero | 7 | (0) |
| 2006 | LDU Portoviejo | | |
| 2007–2010 | Central Español | 17 | (0) |

International career
| 1991 | Uruguay U17 | 1 | (0) |

Managerial career
- 2011–2018: Danubio (youth)
- 2019–2021: Peñarol (reserves)
- 2022: Peñarol (assistant)
- 2023: Alianza Lima (assistant)
- 2024: Newell's Old Boys (assistant)
- 2025: Peñarol (youth)
- 2025–: River Plate Montevideo
- * Club domestic league appearances and goals

Raúl Alejandro Salazar Carrancio (born 20 August 1974) is a Uruguayan football manager and former player who played as a midfielder. He is the current manager of River Plate Montevideo.

== Playing career ==
Born in Montevideo, Salazar was a River Plate Montevideo youth graduate before making his first team debut in 1996. In 1999, he moved abroad and joined Ecuadorian side Aucas, before returning to his former club in 2000.

In 2002, after another one-year spell at Aucas, Salazar signed for Racing Montevideo. He returned to Ecuador in 2004 with LDU Portoviejo, before joining Paraguayan side 3 de Febrero in July 2005.

Salazar returned to LDU Portoviejo in 2006, before returning to his home country in the following year with Central Español. He retired with the latter in 2010, aged 36.

== Managerial career ==
After retiring, Salazar started working in the youth sides of Danubio before joining Peñarol on 26 December 2018, as manager of their reserve side. Ahead of the 2022 season, he became Mauricio Larriera's assistant in the first team.

Salazar followed Larriera to Alianza Lima and Newell's Old Boys, always as his assistant. In January 2025, he returned to Peñarol as an under-19 manager.

On 19 August 2025, Salazar was appointed manager of his first club River Plate.
