= Montevideo Rowing Club =

- Location: Montevideo, Uruguay
- Founded: 8 May 1874; 150 years ago
- Key people: Sergio Varela (President); Joaquín Mones (Captain)
- Affiliations: Uruguayan Rowing Federation

Notable members
- Guillermo Douglas; Eduardo Risso; Miguel Seijas; Mariano Caulín; Rodolfo Collazo; Emiliano Dumestre

Montevideo Rowing Club is a Uruguayan sports club located in the city of Montevideo. Originally established as a rowing club, the institution also hosts the practise of basketball, futsal, gymnastics, handball, judo, karate, tennis and olympic weightlifting.

Montevideo Rowing, founded in 1874, is one of the oldest sports clubs in Uruguay after Montevideo Cricket (MVCC) (founded in 1861 and also considered the oldest in Latin America). The club is also notable because three rowers from the institution won Olympic medals.

== History ==
Club uniform

The club was founded on May 8, 1874 in the Hotel Central, being José Ellauri its first president. Montevideo R.C. was established with the purpose of spreading the practise of sports in Uruguay, mainly rowing. The club is considered a pioneer in football, along with Albion F.C. and the C.U.R.C.C. (both founded in 1891). In fact, the first inter-clubs football match was played between Montevideo Rowing and Montevideo Cricket in 1881. The Montevideo R.C. football team was also part of the first international club match, when on August 15, 1889, the club joined forces with Montevideo Cricket Club (under the name "Montevideo Team") to play a Buenos Aires combined on August 15, 1889.

The first boats acquired were second-hand goods and stored at the Barraca Elliott, club's first headquarters opened in 1874. One of the first rowers was Mr. Fraser, who competed side by side with some Argentine rowers. Arthur Boutell was the first captain for the club and winner in 1875 along with his brother Frank. Montevideo Rowing and Buenos Aires Rowing Club were the only two rowing clubs in the Río de la Plata area by then.

Other international achievements by the Boutell Brothers were in 1875, 1876 and 1877. Carlos Sturzenegger was other notable athlete from the club, winning the Tigre Boat Club trophy competing against the best Argentine rowers in single scull.

When the port of Montevideo was built in 1908 the club had to set a new location near that place, where it remained until September 9, 1928, when the institution inaugurated its new headquarters on the Río Branco street with a building designed by Arq. Mauricio Cravotto.

During the 1930s, a rower from the club, Guillermo Douglas, gained notoriety for being South American champion and winning the Bronze medal at the 1932 Summer Olympics. Other achievements by the club include the Copa América (then "Copa Challenger"), winning the trophy 8 times in 10 years. The next years saw the raise of Eduardo Risso, another extraordinary athlete that won the local and South American championships apart from being the second athlete of the club to win an Olympic medal, a silver one in the 1948 Summer Olympics.

The third (and last to date) rower from the club to win an Olympic medal was Miguel Seijas in 1952. Other successful rowers during those time were Paulo Carvalho and Mariano Caulín (runners-up in the 1959 Pan American Games held in Chicago). Martín Caulín and Gustavo Pérez would win the next edition of the games in 1963. Mariano Caulín is also considered one of the best athletes from the club, having won more than 50 regattas during his career, a record that still remains.

== Honours ==
Some championships won by the club include:

- Copa América (10): 1931, 1932, 1933, 1934, 1935, 1936, 1937, 1938, 1942, 1946
- Regata Internacional de Tigre (1): 1874

== Olympic games ==
Three rowers from the club won medals for Uruguay at three different Olympic Games:

| Year | Athlete | Speciality | Won |
|---|---|---|---|
| 1932 | Guillermo Douglas | Single scull | Bronze medal |
| 1948 | Eduardo Risso | Single scull | Silver medal |
| 1952 | Miguel Seijas | Double scull | Bronze medal |
