= Javier Méndez (footballer, born 1982) =

Uruguayan footballer

Personal information
- Full name: Heber Javier Méndez Leiva
- Date of birth: 6 November 1982 (age 44)
- Place of birth: Montevideo, Uruguay
- Height: 1.78 m (5 ft 10 in)
- Positions: Defender; midfielder

Senior career*
Years	Team	Apps	(Gls)
2003–2008	Progreso	82	(2)
2008–2009	Central Español	7	(0)
2009–2010	El Tanque Sisley	18	(2)
2010–2011	Paraná	11	(0)
2011	Agex/Iguaçu		
2011–2012	J. Malucelli	17	(0)
2012–2013	Cerrito	17	(2)
2013–2014	Cerro	16	(0)
2014–2015	Cerro Largo	20	(3)
2015–2016	Rentistas	18	(0)
2016–2021	Progreso	61	(2)

Managerial career
- 2021–2022: Villa Española (assistant)
- 2024: Lito
- 2025: Progreso
- * Club domestic league appearances and goals

Heber Javier Méndez Leiva (born 6 November 1982) is a Uruguayan professional football coach and a former player who played as a defender or midfielder.

== Career ==
Méndez started his career with Progreso, featuring for the club for five years from 2003 in both the Segunda División and Primera División; with the team winning promotion in 2005–06. Moves to top-flight Central Español and second tier El Tanque Sisley followed, along with twenty-five appearances and two goals. On 18 September 2010, Méndez signed for Campeonato Brasileiro Série B side Paraná. After being an unused substitute for matches with Portuguesa and São Caetano, Méndez made his debut against ASA on 13 November. He played in four Serie B games in 2010 and 2011, as well as playing seven times in the Campeonato Paranaense.

In May 2011, Méndez signed with Campeonato Paranaense lower league team Agex/Iguaçu. Top tier J. Malucelli, then known as Corinthians Paranaense, signed him five months later, with Méndez making seventeen appearances in the state league as they finished ninth overall. Méndez completed a return to Uruguay with Cerrito on 3 October 2012. Méndez joined Cerro ahead of the 2013–14 Primera División season, prior to spending the following campaign in Cerro Largo's ranks. He was sent off three times across twenty matches with Cerro Largo, which matched his goal tally for them. A move to Rentistas was completed in mid-2015.

Having suffered relegation from the Primera División with Rentistas, Méndez left to rejoin Progreso of the Segunda División on 18 August 2016. One goal in twenty-seven fixtures occurred in 2017 as they were promoted to the 2018 Primera División. Despite making just two starts due to injury in 2018, Méndez signed a new contract with Progreso in December.

== Career statistics ==
As of 11 January 2019.

Club statistics
Club	Season	League			Cup		Continental		Other		Total	
Club	Season	Division	Apps	Goals	Apps	Goals	Apps	Goals	Apps	Goals	Apps	Goals
Central Español	2008–09	Primera División	7	0	—		—		0	0	7	0
El Tanque Sisley	2009–10	Segunda División	18	2	—		—		0	0	18	2
Paraná	2010	Série B	3	0	0	0	—		0	0	3	0
Paraná	2011	Série B	1	0	1	0	—		7 (Note: Appearance(s) in the Campeonato Paranaense)	0	9	0
Paraná	Total		4	0	1	0	—		7	0	12	0
J. Malucelli	2011	Campeonato Paranaense	—		0	0	—		17	0	17	0
Cerrito	2012–13	Segunda División	17	2	—		—		0	0	17	2
Cerro	2013–14	Primera División	16	0	—		—		0	0	16	0
Cerro Largo	2014–15	Segunda División	20	3	—		—		0	0	20	3
Rentistas	2015–16	Primera División	18	0	—		—		0	0	18	0
Progreso	2016	Segunda División	9	0	—		—		0	0	9	0
Progreso	2017	Segunda División	24	1	—		—		3 (Note: Appearance(s) in the Segunda División play-offs)	0	27	1
Progreso	2018	Primera División	5	0	—		—		0	0	5	0
Progreso	2019	Primera División	0	0	—		—		0	0	0	0
Progreso	Total		38	1	—		—		3	0	41	1
Career total			138	6	1	0	—		27	0	166	6

== Honours ==
Progreso

- Segunda División: 2005–06

El Tanque Sisley

- Segunda División: 2009–10
