= Albion F.C. =

Albion
- Full name: Albion Football Club
- Nicknames: Decano; Leones; Pionero
- Founded: 1 June 1891; 135 years ago
- Ground: Parque Enrique Falco Lichtemberger; Montevideo, Uruguay
- Capacity: 2,000
- Chairman: Charles Coupland
- Manager: Federico Nieves
- League: Liga AUF Uruguaya
- 2025: Segunda División, 1st of 14 (promoted)
- Website: https://albion.uy/
Home colours	Away colours

Albion Football Club is a Uruguayan football club located in Montevideo that currently plays in the Liga AUF Uruguaya.

Founded in 1891, it is the oldest football club in Uruguay, and is considered to be the oldest because other institutions such as Montevideo Rowing Club and Montevideo Cricket Club had been founded before but they were not specifically dedicated to football.

Regarding its facilities, it has a high-performance Sports City in the La Esperanza neighbourhood, located at Camino Dr. Laudelino Vázquez 3250 (near the Faculty of Veterinary Medicine and across from Zonamerica). The complex contains 1 artificial turf pitch and 6 natural grass pitches, where all the squads train (U14, U15, U16, U17, U19 and the first team). Its headquarters, called Albion House, is located in the Carrasco neighbourhood and houses the club's administrative offices.

In July 2018, Albion became a member of the Club of Pioneers, a worldwide association involving oldest football clubs in the world, as the "oldest active football club in Uruguay".

The club returned to the Primera División by winning the 2021 Segunda División championship, its first promotion to the top flight since 1908.

== History ==
=== Foundation ===
Albion was established on 1 June 1891 as "Football Association" by students from the English High School, mainly encouraged by Henry Lichtenberger, an 18-year-old disciple of William Leslie Poole, considered the "father" of Uruguayan football. During its first years of existence, the club refused to accept non-native players although most of its footballers were British descendants but born in Uruguay. The first uniform was a white jersey with a red star on the chest. Other clubs such as Montevideo Cricket and Montevideo Rowing had played football matches before Albion, that sport was not the main activity of them.

=== Development ===
Football Association's first match was on 2 August 1891 against Montevideo Cricket Club, where it was defeated 3–1. In the second match versus the same rival, FA was defeated again, this time 6–0. On 21 September 1891 the club changed its name to "Albion Football Club" as homage to the country where football had been played for the first time so "Albion" was the name used by Ancient Greeks to refer to Great Britain. The uniform was subsequently modified, and as a result the club adopted a blue jersey with white collar. The uniform was also changed, and blue shirts with white collars and sleeves, along with white shorts and black socks, were adopted as the new uniform.

The popularity of football increased amongst the Uruguayan people between 1892 and 1895. In 1892 there were four clubs practising football: Montevideo Cricket, Montevideo Rowing, Central Uruguay Railway Cricket Club (mostly known as "Peñarol" ) and Albion. Montevideo Cricket was the most successful of them, finishing unbeaten with some remarkable results such as an 8–0 victory over Peñarol and a 10–0 victory over Albion.

On 21 March 1895, Lichtenberger himself suggested to modify the rules to allow foreign players to play at Albion. Other changes were introduced such as the replacement of the jersey so red and blue colors were adopted as a tribute to the flag of Great Britain. At the same time, Montevideo Cricket and Montevideo Rowing left the practise of competitive football, in order to focus on other activities.

=== The golden age: 1895–1900 ===
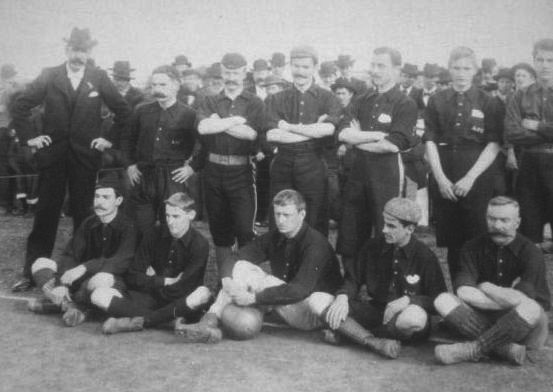
An Albion team of 1898

During this era, Albion became the main football club in Uruguay, being the first team from that country to win outside Uruguay; in 1896 Albion defeated Argentine teams Retiro Athletic Club and Belgrano AC (4-1 and 5-3 respectively), with both matches played in Buenos Aires. These were the first two victories of a Uruguayan club at international level. It is also widely believed that the first international games played in Uruguay were in Punta Carretas, where Albion faced Lobos AC, an Argentine team that played in Primera División until the Argentine Football Association disaffiliated it.

The first Uruguayan derby was between Albion and Peñarol. Peñarol had been founded in 1891 as a cricket club, having added football just one year after its establishment. The first game where both teams faced each other was on 18 July 1892, with Albion winning 3–2. Albion won the most games played between both teams from 1895 to 1897, when they had an extraordinary series of 14 consecutive wins over Peñarol with only one draw in between. From 1896 to 1899 three other football clubs were established; Deutscher Fussball Klub, Uruguay Athletic Club and Club Nacional de Football.

In February 1900, Lichtenberger invited Peñarol, Deutscher, and Uruguay Athletic to form a new league. The creation of the new league was finalized on 30 March of that year, with its name being "Uruguay Association Foot-ball League" (current Uruguayan Football Association). The first championship was disputed that year, where Albion finished second to Peñarol. By those times, some players left the club: Ernesto Caprario, Carlos Carve Urioste and Domingo Prat all moved to Uruguay Athletic. Other players that left the institution were Céspedes brothers, Cuadra, Reyes, Castro, Bouton and Nebel, who later founded Club Nacional de Football.

That same year, the club won the Copa de Competencia. This title allowed it to play in the Tie Cup against the winners of Copa de Competencia Jockey Club with Argentine clubs. Albion played the first five editions of the Tie Cup from 1900 to 1905 (except 1903), but failed to reach the finals in every edition, which included a 9–1 defeat to Montevideo Wanderers in the first round of the 1905 edition.

=== Decline and refoundation ===
In 1901 Albion played a match against an Argentine League combined team, which is considered the first official Uruguay national team match in history. Nevertheless, that game is not considered official and the media referred to the team as Albion FC instead of the Uruguay national team. The team was formed by 9 players from Albion and 2 from Nacional who had been playing for the club before the exodus. On 22 March, Nacional requested the Association to enter the league, and were accepted. Nacional and Peñarol were the most popular teams by then. Albion would make poor performances during the successive seasons, with its worst campaign being the 1905 tournament where the team finished with no points.

On 7 May 1905, the team lost 11–0 to Argentine club Independiente, with this being the first win for the newly created Argentine club. In 1908 the club played its last season in Primera División, as a result of mass selling its players.

In 1914 Albion was one of the teams founding the "Liga Universitaria de Deportes", taking part with a team named "William Poole". By 1931 Albion played in minor leagues and spent the 1940s doing so.

In June 1953, Albion was refounded, and won the "Torneo Preparación" championship undefeated. The club also took part in the Federación Uruguaya de Fútbol Amateur, winning consecutive titles in 1953 and 1954. In addition, the club was a founder of Uruguayan baseball league, and has competitive basketball and athletics teams.

In 1976 Albion merged with Club Sportivo Miramar and changed its name to "Albion Miramar", as well as entering the fourth division, Divisional Extra. However, this merge only lasted one year.

=== Promotions ===
Since then, Albion played in the third division (Segunda División Amateur) until 2017, when it won the third division title (now renamed Segunda Division B), after defeating Colón 3–2 on aggregate.

From 2018 to 2021, the club played in Segunda División, and earned promotion to the top division in the 2021 season by winning the title and finishing first in the table with 44 points. The promotion also marked 113 years without Albion playing in the top division.

== Current squad ==
As of 22 March, 2026

Note: Flags indicate national team as defined under FIFA eligibility rules; some limited exceptions apply. Players may hold more than one non-FIFA nationality.

No.	Pos.	Nation	Player
1	GK	URU	Sebastián Jaume
2	DF	URU	Francisco Couture
5	MF	URU	Francisco Ginella
6	MF	ARG	Tomás Moschión
7	MF	URU	Leonardo Pais
8	MF	URU	Octavio Perdomo
9	FW	ARG	Álvaro López (on loan from Plaza Colonia)
10	MF	ARG	Carlos Airala
11	FW	ARG	Hernán Toledo
12	GK	URU	Pedro Ramallo
13	DF	URU	Pablo Lacoste
14	FW	URU	Mateo Alcoba
15	MF	URU	Pablo Alcoba
16	DF	URU	José Álvarez

No.	Pos.	Nation	Player
17	DF	URU	Matías de los Santos
20	MF	URU	Román Gutiérrez
21	FW	URU	Lucas Rodríguez
22	FW	URU	Agustín Vera (on loan from Nacional)
24	DF	URU	Ezequiel Burdín
25	DF	URU	Andrés Romero
27	MF	URU	Santiago Costa
29	DF	URU	Federico Puente
30	FW	URU	Briam Acosta
31	GK	ARG	Danilo Lerda
32	FW	ARG	Tobías Figueroa
34	DF	URU	Agustín Pereira
79	FW	URU	Nahuel Roldán

=== Notable players ===
- (Australia) Nathan Lozada

== Colors ==
=== Uniform evolution ===
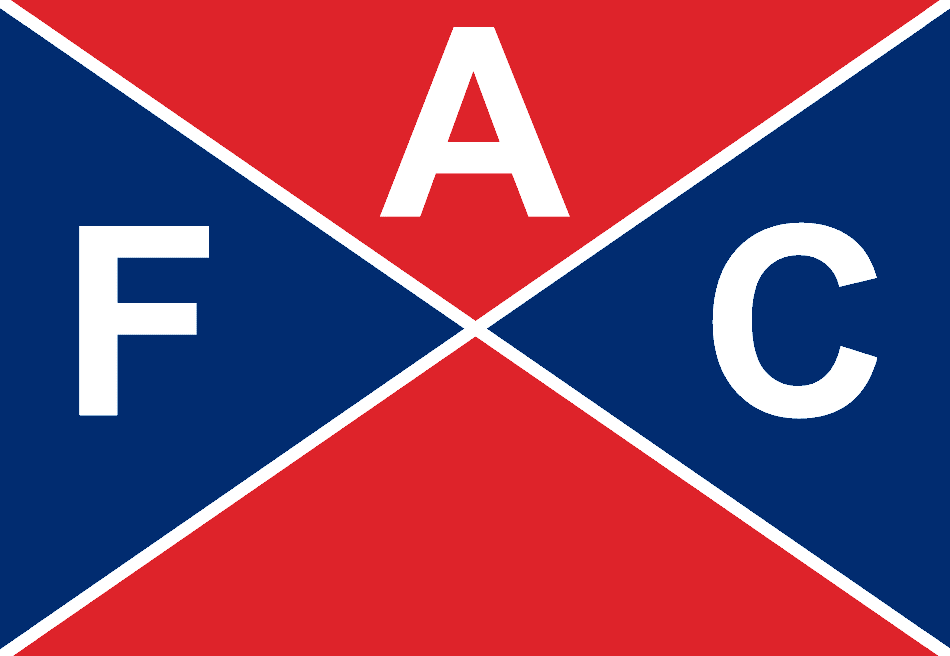
Official flag

1891	1891–1895	1895–present

== Honours ==
- Copa de Competencia (1): 1900
- Uruguayan Segunda División (2): 2021, 2025
- Segunda División B Nacional (1): 2017
