= Gonzalo Aguilar =

Uruguayan footballer (born 1987)

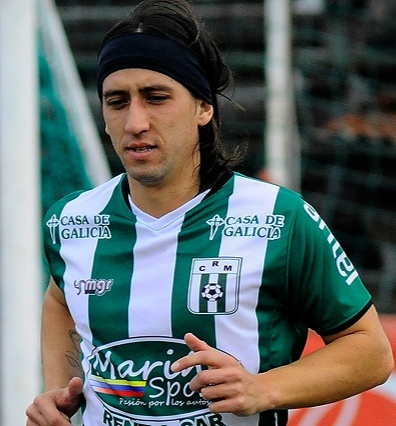

Personal information
- Full name: Gonzalo Aguilar Camacho
- Date of birth: 2 August 1987 (age 39)
- Place of birth: Montevideo, Uruguay
- Height: 1.72 m (5 ft 8 in)
- Position: Right-back

Team information
- Current team: Racing Montevideo (assistant)

Youth career
- Olimpo Junior
- 2000–2006: Racing Montevideo

Senior career*
Years	Team	Apps	(Gls)
2006–2023	Racing Montevideo	310	(5)

Managerial career
- 2025–: Racing Montevideo (assistant)
- * Club domestic league appearances and goals

Gonzalo Aguilar Camacho (born 2 August 1987) is a Uruguayan football manager and former player who played as a right-back. He is the current assistant manager of Racing Montevideo.

== Career statistics ==
Appearances and goals by club, season and competition
Club	Season	League			Cup		Continental (Note: Includes Copa Libertadores)		Other (Note: Includes Uruguayan Segunda División promotion playoffs)		Total	
Club	Season	Division	Apps	Goals	Apps	Goals	Apps	Goals	Apps	Goals	Apps	Goals
Racing Club	2009–10	Uruguayan Primera División	11	0	—	—	1	0	—	—	12	0
Racing Club	2010–11	Uruguayan Primera División	18	1	—	—	—	—	—	—	18	1
Racing Club	2011–12	Uruguayan Primera División	21	1	—	—	—	—	—	—	21	1
Racing Club	2012–13	Uruguayan Primera División	24	1	—	—	—	—	—	—	24	1
Racing Club	2013–14	Uruguayan Primera División	27	0	—	—	—	—	—	—	27	0
Racing Club	2014–15	Uruguayan Primera División	30	1	—	—	—	—	—	—	30	1
Racing Club	2015–16	Uruguayan Primera División	13	0	—	—	—	—	—	—	13	0
Racing Club	2016	Uruguayan Primera División	13	0	—	—	—	—	—	—	13	0
Racing Club	2017	Uruguayan Primera División	9	0	—	—	—	—	—	—	9	0
Racing Club	2018	Uruguayan Primera División	10	0	—	—	—	—	—	—	10	0
Racing Club	2019	Uruguayan Primera División	19	0	—	—	—	—	—	—	19	0
Racing Club	2020	Uruguayan Segunda División	19	1	—	—	—	—	2	0	21	1
Career total			214	5	—	—	1	0	2	0	217	5
