= Carlos María Domínguez =

Argentine writer

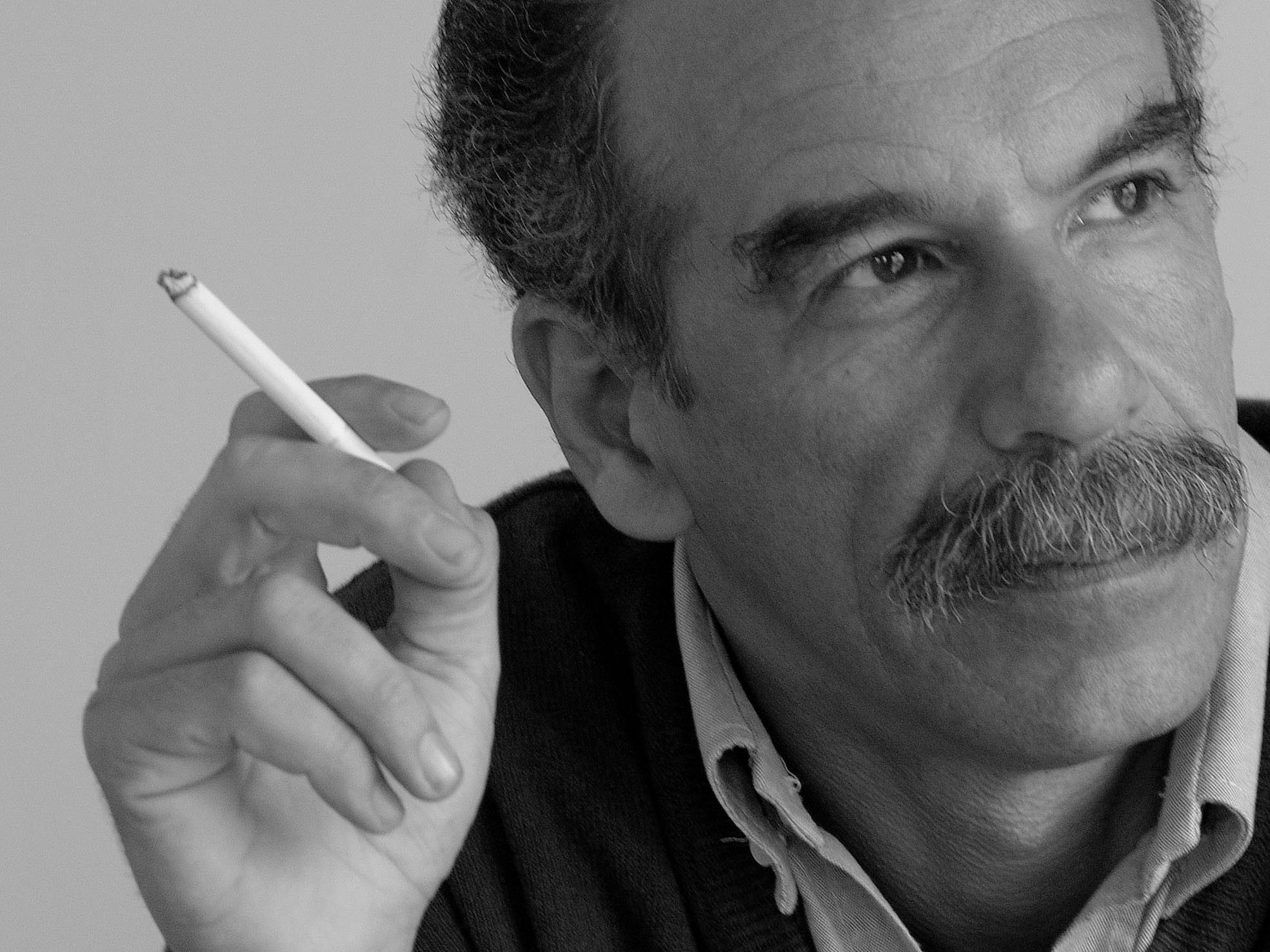
Picture of Carlos María Dominguez.

Carlos María Domínguez (born 23 April 1955 in Buenos Aires) is an Argentine writer and journalist who has lived in Montevideo since 1989.

== Biography ==
Domínguez began his career in the Argentine magazine, Crisis. Afterwards, he specialized in literary criticism, joining the Uruguayan weeklies Brecha, Búsqueda, and the cultural supplement of EL PAIS.

== Work ==
Domínguez has written around 20 books, including novels, short stories, travel chronicles, biographies, and plays.

- Pozo de Vargas (novel), Emecé, Buenos Aires, 1985.
- Bicicletas negras (novel), Arca, Montevideo, 1990.
- Construcción de la noche. La vida de Juan Carlos Onetti (biography), Planeta, Buenos Aires, 1993.
- La mujer hablada (novel), Cal y Canto, Montevideo, 1995.
- El bastardo. La vida de Roberto de las Carreras y su madre Clara (biografía), Cal y Canto, Montevideo, 1997.
- La confesión de Johnny (story), Ediciones de la Banda Oriental, Montevideo, 1998.
- El compás de oro (Entrevistas), Ediciones de la Gente, Buenos Aires, 1999.
- Tola Invernizzi. La rebelión de la ternura (biography), Trilce, Montevideo, 2001.
- Delitos de amores crueles. Las mujeres uruguayas y la justicia (chronicles), Alfaguara, Montevideo, 2001.
- Una joya por cada rata. Memorias de un asaltante de bancos (chronicles), Cal y Canto, Montevideo, 2001.
- Tres muescas en mi carabina (novel), Alfaguara, Montevideo, 2002.
- La casa de papel (novel), Ediciones de la Banda Oriental, Montevideo, 2002.
- Escritos en el agua (chronicles), Ediciones de la Banda Oriental, Montevideo, 2002.
- Historias del polvo y el camino (chronicles), Ed. de la Gente, Buenos Aires, 2002.
- El norte profundo (chronicles), Ediciones de la Banda Oriental, Montevideo, 2004.
- Mares baldíos (chronicles), Eichborn, Frankfurt, 2005 (Wüste Meere).
- Las puertas de la tierra (chronicles), Ediciones de la Banda Oriental, Montevideo, 2007.
- La costa ciega (novel), Mondadori, Buenos Aires, 2009.
- 24 ilusiones por segundo : La historia de Cinemateca Uruguaya (chronicles), Cinemateca Uruguaya, Montevideo, 2013.

== Awards ==
- With his novel La mujer hablada he won the Bartolomé Hidalgo Prize in 1995
- Prize of the Spanish Embassy in honor of Juan Carlos Onetti for Tres muescas en mi carabina (2002)
- National Essay Prize for Escritos en el agua (2002)
- Lolita Rubial Prize for La casa de papel, which was translated into more than 20 languages (2002)
- Buch des Monats, Darmstadt, Germany, 2004
- Jury der Jungen Leser, Vienna, Austria, 2005
