= Danielo Núñez =

Uruguayan footballer and manager (born 1964)

Personal information
- Full name: Luis Danielo Núñez Maciel
- Date of birth: 25 October 1964 (age 62)
- Place of birth: Melo, Uruguay
- Position: Midfielder

Youth career
- Years: Team
- Melo Wanderers

Managerial career
- 1982: Melo Wanderers (youth)
- 1991: Melo Wanderers
- Artigas
- 2009–2010: Cerro Largo
- 2010–2012: Cerro Largo
- 2013: Cerro Largo
- 2014–2015: Cerro Largo
- 2018–2022: Cerro Largo
- 2022–2023: Cerro
- 2023: Bella Vista
- 2024–2026: Cerro Largo
- 2026: Cerro Largo

Luis Danielo Núñez Maciel (born 25 October 1964) is a Uruguayan football manager and former player who played as a midfielder.

== Career ==
Núñez was born in Melo, and started his managerial career at the age of 17, with local side Melo Wanderers. He subsequently acquired his coaching license and later managed Artigas before joining Cerro Largo as a sporting director.

Núñez was appointed first team manager of Cerro Largo for the 2009 Clausura, but was replaced by Santiago Ostolaza in March 2010. He returned to the role in August 2010, as the club was relegated to the Segunda División, and helped the club in their immediate promotion back.

Núñez resigned in October 2012, being replaced by Osmar Huguet. Huguet left in January 2013, and Núñez return to the role but left again in June after failing to renew his contract.

On 3 April 2014, Núñez returned to Cerro Largo for a fourth spell. He left again in March 2015, being later replaced by Gustavo Lucas.

On 28 January 2018, Núñez rejoined Cerro Largo for a fifth period. He won the second level tournament in his first season, and qualified the club to the Copa Libertadores in his second. On 25 December 2019, he renewed his contract with the club for a further year.

On 18 April 2022, Núñez announced his resignation from Cerro Largo after more than four years in charge, with his last match occurring four days later. He later took over Cerro and led the side to the top tier, but left on a mutual agreement on 4 April 2023.

On 25 July 2024, after a short stint at Bella Vista, Núñez returned to Cerro Largo. He left the latter for personal reasons on 18 May 2026, returning on 10 August but again resigning on 5 September.

== Honours ==
=== Club ===
Cerro Largo

- Uruguayan Segunda División: 2018

=== Individual ===
- Uruguayan Primera División Best Manager: 2019
