= Melo, Uruguay =

Melo
- Capital city
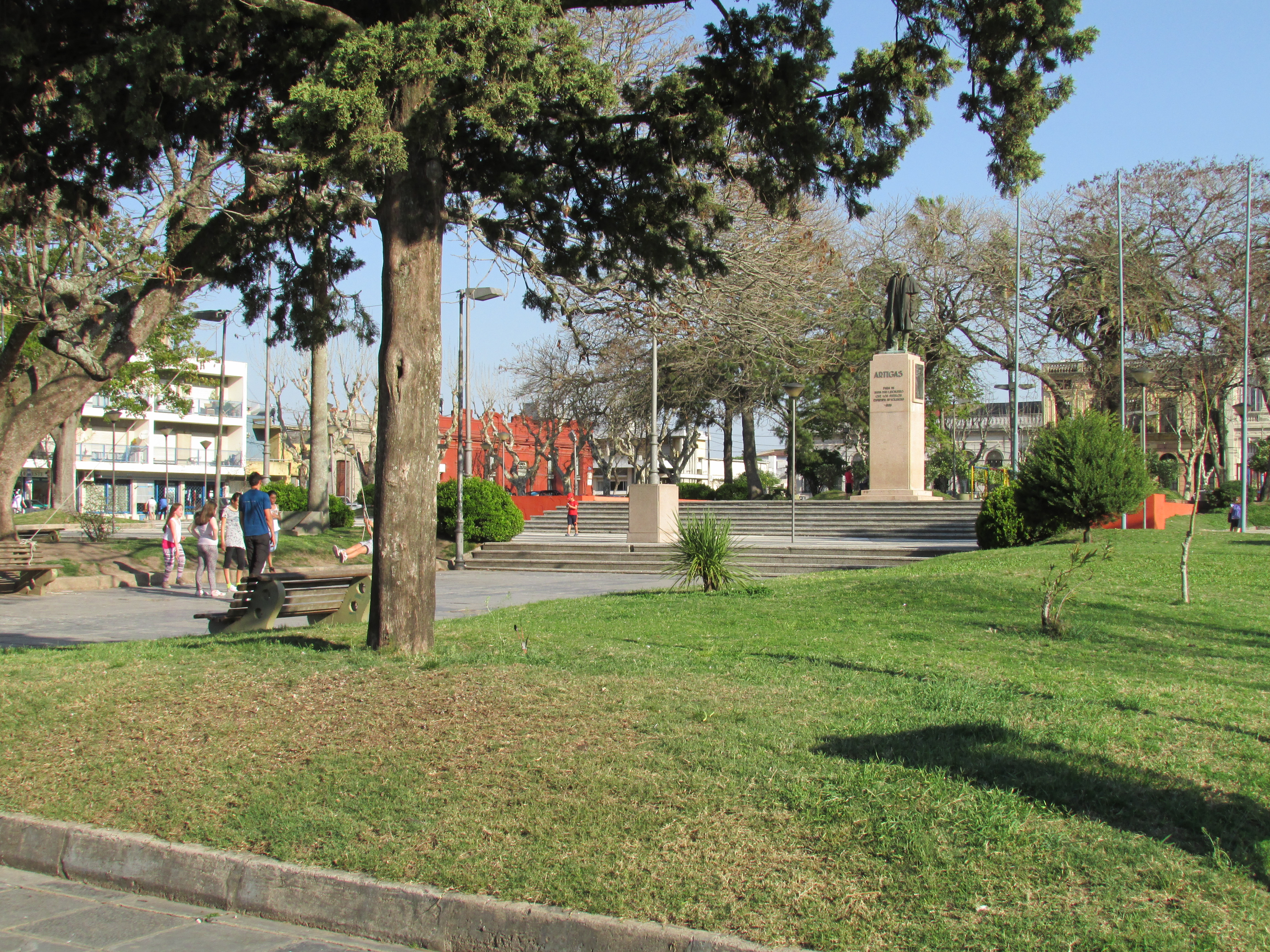
- Artigas Monument and Plaza Constitución

- Location within Uruguay
- Coordinates: 32°22′0″S 54°11′0″W
- Country: Uruguay
- Department: Cerro Largo
- Founded: 1795
- Founded by: Agustín de la Rosa

Area
  - Total: 18.8 km^{2} (7.3 sq mi)
- Elevation: 80 m (260 ft)

Population (2023 Census)
  - Total: 56,013
  - Density: 2,980/km^{2} (7,720/sq mi)
  - Demonym: melense
- Time zone: UTC -3
- Postal code: 37000
- Dial plan: +598 464 (+5 digits)
- Climate: Cfa
- Website: Official site of Cerro Largo

Melo (Spanish pronunciation: [ˈmelo]) is the capital city of the Cerro Largo Department of north-eastern Uruguay. As of the census of 2023, it is the ninth most populated city of the country with a population of 56,013.

== Geography ==
=== Location ===
It is located at the center of the department, on the intersection of Route 7 with Route 8, 60 kilometres (37 mi) south of Aceguá and the border with Brazil. Other primary roads to the city are Route 26 and Route 44.

The stream Arroyo Conventos (a tributary of Tacuarí River) flows by the west limits of the city.

=== Climate ===
Melo has a humid subtropical climate, described by the Köppen climate classification as Cfa. Summers are warm (with hot days and cool nights) and winters are cool, with frequent frosts and fog. The precipitation is evenly distributed throughout the year, with an average of 1,241 mm (48.85 in), and the annual average temperature is 17 °C (63 °F).

This city has the lowest recorded temperature in Uruguay, of -11 °C (12.2 °F), on June 14, 1967.

Climate data for Melo, Cerro Largo (1991–2020, extremes 1937–2020)
Month	Jan	Feb	Mar	Apr	May	Jun	Jul	Aug	Sep	Oct	Nov	Dec	Year
Record high °C (°F)	43.0 (109.4)	40.5 (104.9)	40.4 (104.7)	38.0 (100.4)	32.3 (90.1)	30.2 (86.4)	30.0 (86.0)	35.0 (95.0)	37.0 (98.6)	37.0 (98.6)	38.4 (101.1)	45.0 (113.0)	45.0 (113.0)
Mean daily maximum °C (°F)	30.2 (86.4)	29.4 (84.9)	27.9 (82.2)	24.4 (75.9)	20.4 (68.7)	17.7 (63.9)	17.1 (62.8)	19.3 (66.7)	20.3 (68.5)	23.1 (73.6)	26.1 (79.0)	28.9 (84.0)	23.7 (74.7)
Daily mean °C (°F)	23.8 (74.8)	23.3 (73.9)	21.7 (71.1)	18.3 (64.9)	14.7 (58.5)	12.2 (54.0)	11.6 (52.9)	13.4 (56.1)	14.7 (58.5)	17.5 (63.5)	19.8 (67.6)	22.3 (72.1)	17.8 (64.0)
Mean daily minimum °C (°F)	17.4 (63.3)	17.1 (62.8)	15.4 (59.7)	12.1 (53.8)	8.9 (48.0)	6.8 (44.2)	6.1 (43.0)	7.5 (45.5)	9.2 (48.6)	12.0 (53.6)	13.5 (56.3)	15.7 (60.3)	11.8 (53.2)
Record low °C (°F)	1.0 (33.8)	3.6 (38.5)	0.0 (32.0)	−5.2 (22.6)	−5.9 (21.4)	−11.0 (12.2)	−9.6 (14.7)	−4.8 (23.4)	−4.0 (24.8)	−3.0 (26.6)	1.2 (34.2)	4.0 (39.2)	−11.0 (12.2)
Average precipitation mm (inches)	90.4 (3.56)	132.9 (5.23)	100.5 (3.96)	154.9 (6.10)	120.4 (4.74)	120.7 (4.75)	116.0 (4.57)	110.3 (4.34)	132.8 (5.23)	134.3 (5.29)	99.7 (3.93)	101.2 (3.98)	1,414.1 (55.67)
Average precipitation days (≥ 1.0 mm)	7	7	7	8	7	8	7	7	8	9	6	6	87
Average relative humidity (%)	69	72	74	76	79	81	79	77	75	74	71	69	75
Mean monthly sunshine hours	275.3	229.5	232.3	189.0	169.1	141.9	159.9	184.0	179.8	205.2	252.2	274.8	2,493
Source 1: Instituto Uruguayo de Metereología
Source 2: NOAA (precipitation and sun 1991–2020), Instituto Nacional de Investigación Agropecuaria (humidity 1980–2009)

== History ==
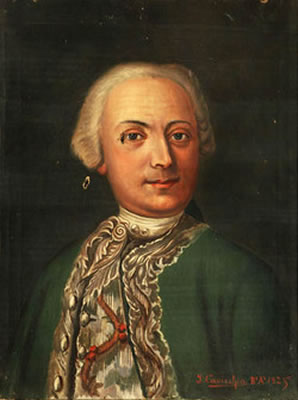
Pedro Melo de Portugal, the city's namesake.

It was founded on 27 June 1795 by Agustín de la Rosa, an officer to the Spanish Empire. It was named after Pedro Melo de Portugal, a Spanish colonial official of Portuguese royal ancestry.

Given its proximity to some Portuguese colonies in Brazil, the "Melo Village" (in Spanish, "Villa de Melo"), as it was once named, was invaded by Portuguese forces in 1801, 1811, and 1816. With Uruguayan independence, Melo was officially declared capital of the department of Cerro Largo.

In 1845, the city square was renamed in honor of Manuel Oribe, a former President of Uruguay and a political leader of the White Party (Partido Blanco), which brought to light the relations of this corner of the country with that National Movement (the vast majority of its inhabitants have belonged to that same political community).

Melo had acquired the status of "Villa" (town) before the Independence of Uruguay. Its status was elevated to "Ciudad" (city) on 22 May 1895 by the Act of Ley Nº 2.3279. It was capital of one of the nine original departments of the Republic.

The historian J.C. Chasteen has discussed the place of Melo in the history of Uruguay in his book Heroes on Horseback: A Life and Times of the Last Gaucho Caudillos.

== Population ==
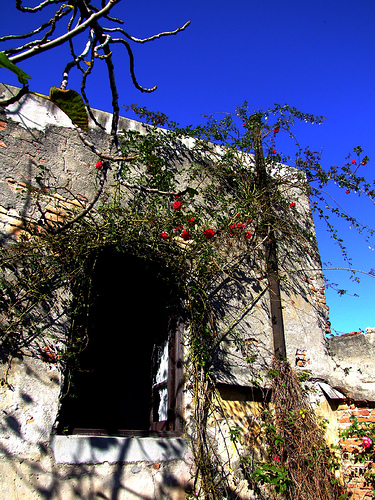
The house of Juana de Ibarbourou (also known as "Juana de América") in Melo.

In 2023 Melo had a population of 56,013 inhabitants.

Year	Population
1908	12,355
1963	33,741
1975	38,487
1985	42,245
1996	46,883
2004	50,578
2011	51,830
2023	56,013

Source: National Statistics Institute

== Features ==
There are two museums:

- Juana de Ibarbourou's birthplace
- Regional History Museum

Near Melo is situated the old Posta del Chuy, a stone inn near an ancient bridge over the Chuy del Tacuarí creek.

Melo was visited by Pope John Paul II in 1988. This formed the background to the 2006 film El Baño del Papa (The Pope's Toilet) about an enterprising citizen with the ill-fated idea of making money by building a toilet and charging the hordes of Brazilians expected to visit Melo to see the Pope.

== Places of worship ==
- Cathedral of Our Lady of the Pillar and St. Raphael (Roman Catholic)
- Parish Church of Our Lady of Mt. Carmel (Roman Catholic)
- Parish Church of St. Joseph the Worker (Roman Catholic)
- Parish Church of St. Dominic Savio and St. Charles Borromeo (Roman Catholic, Salesians of Don Bosco)
- Jesus Good Shepherd Parish Church (Roman Catholic, Sisters of Santa Dorotea di Cemmo)

== Notable people ==
- Juana de Ibarbourou (1892-1979), poet
- Saviniano Pérez (1907–1985), politician

== See also ==
- Melo HVDC Back-to-back station

== Bibliography ==
- Domínguez, Carlos María (2004). El norte profundo (in Spanish). Montevideo: Ediciones de la Banda Oriental.
