= Cerro Largo F.C. =

Uruguayan football club

Cerro Largo
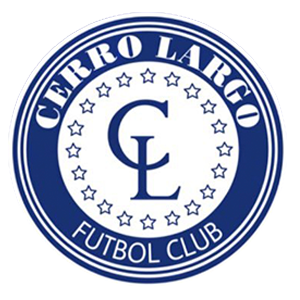
- Full name: Cerro Largo Fútbol Club
- Nickname: Arachán
- Founded: 19 November 2002; 23 years ago
- Ground: Estadio Arquitecto Antonio Eleuterio Ubilla
- Capacity: 9,000
- Chairman: Ernesto Dehl
- Manager: Danielo Núñez
- League: Liga AUF Uruguaya
- 2025: Liga AUF Uruguaya, 9th of 16
- Website: cerrolargofc.com
Home colours	Away colours

Cerro Largo Fútbol Club is a football club from Melo, Cerro Largo Department in Uruguay. They play their games at Estadio Arquitecto Antonio Eleuterio Ubilla. They are followed by many fans since it is the only professional team that represents the Cerro Largo Department. They currently play in the Uruguayan First División.

== History ==
The club was founded in 2002, making them one of the youngest teams in Uruguay. In their first ever season, they placed 9th in the final league table.

In 2007, after an excellent campaign in the Uruguayan Segunda División, the club was promoted for the first time to the Primera División where they played for two consecutive seasons.

In 2011, although they had finished 6th, they qualified for the promotion playoffs and were promoted after beating Atenas and Boston River. They were relegated in the 2013-14 season. They lost the Segunda Division promotion play off in 2016 and 2017.

In 2018, after battling for three consecutive years, they won the Segunda Division and were promoted back to the Primera Division. In 2019, they finished 3rd in the league and qualified for the 2020 Copa Libertadores for their first time ever.

== Performance in CONMEBOL competitions ==
- Copa Libertadores: 1 appearance

2020: Second stage

- Copa Sudamericana: 2 appearances

2012: First stage
2024: First Stage

== Current squad ==
As of 22 March, 2026

Note: Flags indicate national team as defined under FIFA eligibility rules; some limited exceptions apply. Players may hold more than one non-FIFA nationality.

No.	Pos.	Nation	Player
1	GK	COL	Juan Moreno
2	DF	ARG	Gabriel Chocobar
3	DF	URU	Alexis Piegas
4	DF	URU	Fernando Souza
5	MF	URU	Santiago Marcel
6	DF	URU	Mateo Monserrat
7	FW	URU	Gustavo Viera
8	MF	URU	Mario García (on loan from Progreso)
9	FW	URU	Tiziano Correa
10	MF	URU	Axel Pandiani
11	FW	URU	Maximiliano Añasco
12	GK	PAR	Pedro González
13	FW	URU	Borys Barone
14	DF	URU	Lucas Correa
15	MF	URU	Sebastián Assis

No.	Pos.	Nation	Player
16	DF	URU	Matías Fracchia
17	FW	URU	Alexander Hernández
18	FW	URU	Diego Daguerre
19	FW	URU	Federico Sellecchia
20	DF	URU	Santiago Franca
21	DF	URU	Julián Pou
22	MF	ARG	Nicolás Bertocchi
23	FW	URU	Thomas González
24	GK	URU	Lukas González
25	MF	URU	Emiliano Jourdan
27	DF	URU	Facundo Alvez
28	DF	URU	Nicolás Ramos (on loan from Club Nacional)
29	FW	URU	Ihojan Pérez
30	MF	URU	Bruno Hernández

== Managers ==
- (Uruguay) Danielo Nunez (January 2009 - May 2013)
- (Uruguay) Juan Jacinto Rodríguez (June 2013 - November 2013)
- (Uruguay) Eduardo Uzal (November 2013 - March 2014)
- (Uruguay) Danielo Núñez (April 2014 - May 2015)
- (Uruguay) Gustavo Lucas (July 2015 - May 2017)
- (Uruguay) Adrian Fernandez (May 2017 - December 2017)
- (Uruguay) Danielo Nunez (January 2018 – present)

== Achievements ==
- Segunda Division
  - Winners: 2018
  - Runners-up: 2007–08, 2016
