= 2019 Campeonato Uruguayo Primera División =

116th season of the top-tier football league in Uruguay

Liga Profesional de Primera División
- Season: 2019
- Dates: 16 February – 15 December 2019
- Champions: Nacional (47th title)
- Relegated: Racing; Rampla Juniors; Juventud
- Copa Libertadores: Nacional; Peñarol; Cerro Largo; Progreso
- Copa Sudamericana: Liverpool; Plaza Colonia; River Plate; Fénix
- Matches: 299
- Goals: 804 (2.69 per match)
- Top goalscorer: Apertura: Leonardo Fernández (12 goals); Intermedio: Juan Ignacio Ramírez (8 goals); Clausura: Gonzalo Bergessio and Jonathan Dos Santos (7 goals each)
- Biggest home win: Nacional 6–0 River Plate (6 April)
- Biggest away win: Liverpool 0–5 Danubio (11 May)
- Highest scoring: Fénix 4–4 Liverpool (24 February); Liverpool 3–5 Progreso (2 March); Liverpool 6–2 Defensor Sporting (16 March); Fénix 4–4 Nacional (20 April)

The 2019 Liga Profesional de Primera División season, also known as the Campeonato Uruguayo 2019, was the 116th season of Uruguay's top-flight football league, and the 89th in which it is professional. The season was named as "100 Años de Racing Club de Montevideo" and was originally scheduled to begin on 9 February but its start was pushed back for one week to 16 February. The season ended on 15 December with Nacional winning their forty-seventh title by beating Peñarol in the semifinal. Peñarol were the defending champions, having won back-to-back titles in 2017 and 2018.

== Teams ==
Locations of the 2019 season teams outside Montevideo.
Locations of the 2019 Primera División teams within Montevideo.

El Tanque Sisley, who did not compete in the 2018 season, as well as the two bottom-placed teams in the relegation table of the 2018 season, Torque and Atenas, were relegated to the Segunda División for the 2019 season. They will be replaced by Cerro Largo, Juventud, and Plaza Colonia, who were promoted from the Segunda División.

Club	Manager	City	Stadium	Capacity
Boston River	(Uruguay) Martín García	Montevideo; Florida	Complejo Rentistas; Campeones Olímpicos	10,600; 7,000
Cerro	(Uruguay) Julio César Antúnez	Montevideo	Luis Tróccoli	24,000
Cerro Largo	(Uruguay) Danielo Núñez	Melo	Antonio Ubilla	9,000
Danubio	(Uruguay) Mauricio Larriera	Montevideo	Jardines del Hipódromo	14,401
Defensor Sporting	(Uruguay) Ignacio Risso	Montevideo	Luis Franzini	18,000
Fénix	(Uruguay) Juan Ramón Carrasco	Montevideo	Parque Capurro	5,500
Juventud	(Uruguay) Pablo Tiscornia	Las Piedras	Parque Artigas	12,000
Liverpool	(Uruguay) Osvaldo Canobbio (caretaker)	Montevideo	Belvedere	10,000
Montevideo Wanderers	(Uruguay) Alfredo Arias	Montevideo	Parque Alfredo Víctor Viera	7,420
Nacional	(Uruguay) Álvaro Gutiérrez	Montevideo	Gran Parque Central	34,000
Peñarol	(Uruguay) Diego López	Montevideo	Campeón del Siglo	40,000
Plaza Colonia	(Uruguay) Matías Rosa	Colonia	Parque Juan Prandi	4,500
Progreso	(Uruguay) Leonel Rocco	Montevideo	Parque Abraham Paladino	8,000
Racing	(Uruguay) Eduardo Favaro	Montevideo	Osvaldo Roberto	8,500
Rampla Juniors	(Uruguay) Eduardo Espinel	Montevideo	Olímpico	9,500
River Plate	(Uruguay) Jorge Fossati	Montevideo	Parque Federico Omar Saroldi	5,624

=== Managerial changes ===
Team	Outgoing manager	Manner of departure	Date of vacancy	Position in table	Incoming manager	Date of appointment
Torneo Apertura
Progreso	(Uruguay) Marcelo Méndez	Resigned	6 November 2018	Pre-season	(Uruguay) Leonel Rocco	21 November 2018
Rampla Juniors	(Uruguay) Julio César Antúnez	End of contract	12 November 2018	Pre-season	(Argentina) Julio César Toresani	14 November 2018
Montevideo Wanderers	(Uruguay) Eduardo Espinel	Mutual agreement	23 November 2018	Pre-season	(Uruguay) Román Cuello	28 November 2018
Defensor Sporting	(Uruguay) Eduardo Acevedo	Resigned	5 December 2018	Pre-season	(Uruguay) Jorge da Silva	13 December 2018
Nacional	(Uruguay) Alexander Medina	Resigned	7 December 2018	Pre-season	(Argentina) Eduardo Domínguez	27 December 2018
Cerro	(Uruguay) Fernando Correa	End of contract	10 December 2018	Pre-season	(Uruguay) Jorge González	20 December 2018
Danubio	(Uruguay) Pablo Peirano	End of contract	12 December 2018	Pre-season	(Uruguay) Marcelo Méndez	17 December 2018
Boston River	(Uruguay) Alejandro Apud	Resigned	18 December 2018	Pre-season	(Uruguay) Gastón Machado	24 December 2018
Rampla Juniors	(Argentina) Julio César Toresani	Sacked	26 February 2019	16th	(Uruguay) Gastón de los Santos (caretaker)	27 February 2019
Rampla Juniors	(Uruguay) Gastón de los Santos	End of caretaker spell	4 March 2019	16th	(Uruguay) Rosario Martínez	5 March 2019
Nacional	(Argentina) Eduardo Domínguez	Sacked	17 March 2019	15th	(Uruguay) Álvaro Gutiérrez	17 March 2019
Plaza Colonia	(Uruguay) Mario Szlafmyc	Resigned	27 March 2019	14th	(Uruguay) Matías Rosa	27 March 2019
Defensor Sporting	(Uruguay) Jorge da Silva	Mutual consent	1 April 2019	16th	(Uruguay) Ignacio Risso	1 April 2019
Cerro	(Uruguay) Jorge González	Sacked	7 April 2019	16th	(Uruguay) Richard Martínez	8 April 2019
Racing	(Uruguay) Juan Tejera	Resigned	1 June 2019	12th	(Uruguay) Alejandro Apud	13 June 2019
Torneo Intermedio
River Plate	(Uruguay) Jorge Giordano	Mutual consent	10 June 2019	Pre-tournament	(Uruguay) Jorge Fossati	13 June 2019
Boston River	(Uruguay) Gastón Machado	Sacked	29 July 2019	8th, Serie A	(Uruguay) Martín García	30 July 2019
Rampla Juniors	(Uruguay) Rosario Martínez	Sacked	19 August 2019	6th, Serie B	(Uruguay) Gastón de los Santos (caretaker)	19 August 2019
Cerro	(Uruguay) Richard Martínez	Sacked	21 August 2019	7th, Serie B	(Uruguay) Santiago Kalemkerian (caretaker)	22 August 2019
Rampla Juniors	(Uruguay) Gastón de los Santos	End of caretaker spell	25 August 2019	6th, Serie B	(Uruguay) Eduardo Espinel	26 August 2019
Cerro	(Uruguay) Santiago Kalemkerian	End of caretaker spell	31 August 2019	7th, Serie B	(Uruguay) Julio César Antúnez	29 August 2019
Juventud	(Uruguay) Álvaro Fuerte	Sacked	31 August 2019	6th, Serie A	(Uruguay) Pablo Tiscornia	3 September 2019
Montevideo Wanderers	(Uruguay) Román Cuello	Sacked	1 September 2019	8th, Serie B	(Uruguay) Alfredo Arias	2 September 2019
Danubio	(Uruguay) Marcelo Méndez	Resigned	2 September 2019	8th, Serie A	(Uruguay) Mauricio Larriera	4 September 2019
Torneo Clausura
Racing	(Uruguay) Alejandro Apud	Resigned	23 September 2019	16th	(Uruguay) Eduardo Favaro	24 September 2019
Liverpool	(Uruguay) Paulo Pezzolano	Signed by Pachuca	25 November 2019	8th	(Uruguay) Osvaldo Canobbio (caretaker)	25 November 2019

== Torneo Apertura ==
The Torneo Apertura, named "Sr. Juan Lazaroff", was the first tournament of the 2019 season. It began on 16 February and ended on 5 June.

=== Standings ===
Pos	Team	Pld	W	D	L	GF	GA	GD	Pts	Qualification
1	Peñarol	15	9	4	2	27	11	+16	31	Qualification for Championship playoff
2	Fénix	15	8	4	3	36	26	+10	28	
3	Nacional	15	7	6	2	32	17	+15	27	
4	Cerro Largo	15	8	3	4	23	12	+11	27	
5	Danubio	15	8	3	4	22	17	+5	27	
6	Montevideo Wanderers	15	6	5	4	21	22	−1	23	
7	Progreso	15	6	4	5	27	25	+2	22	
8	Liverpool	15	5	5	5	29	29	0	20	
9	Boston River	15	5	5	5	18	22	−4	20	
10	Rampla Juniors	15	5	3	7	16	23	−7	18	
11	Defensor Sporting	15	4	4	7	21	27	−6	16	
12	Racing	15	4	3	8	20	30	−10	15	
13	Juventud	15	4	2	9	21	22	−1	14	
14	Plaza Colonia	15	3	5	7	15	21	−6	14	
15	River Plate	15	3	5	7	14	30	−16	14	
16	Cerro	15	3	3	9	14	23	−9	12	

Source: AUF, Soccerway
Rules for classification: 1) Points, 2) Playoff game, in case two teams are tied for first place.
If there are more than two teams tied in points: 2) Goal difference, 3) Goals for, 4) Head-to-head record, 5) Drawing of lots, 6) Playoff game, in case two teams are still tied for first place.

=== Results ===
Home \ Away	BOR	CRR	CRL	DAN	DFS	FNX	JUV	LIV	WAN	NAC	PEÑ	PCO	PRO	RAC	RAJ	RIV
Boston River	—	—	2–3	—	—	1–3	—	0–4	—	—	0–4	2–2	—	2–1	1–1	2–0
Cerro	0–1	—	—	—	0–2	—	1–0	—	3–0	0–2	—	1–1	0–2	—	—	—
Cerro Largo	—	4–1	—	2–0	—	2–0	—	—	—	2–2	1–0	1–0	0–0	—	—	2–0
Danubio	1–0	1–0	—	—	1–1	—	4–3	—	0–2	2–0	—	—	3–2	—	—	—
Defensor Sporting	0–0	—	0–3	—	—	2–4	1–4	—	1–1	—	0–1	4–1	—	—	—	1–1
Fénix	—	2–1	—	5–1	—	—	—	4–4	—	4–4	1–2	—	—	2–0	3–1	—
Juventud	0–1	—	1–0	—	—	1–2	—	—	4–1	—	—	0–0	—	—	1–1	4–1
Liverpool	—	2–2	3–2	0–5	6–2	—	2–1	—	—	1–1	—	—	3–5	1–1	—	—
Montevideo Wanderers	0–3	—	0–0	—	—	0–2	—	2–1	—	—	2–0	2–2	—	—	1–0	1–1
Nacional	2–2	—	—	—	1–0	—	1–0	—	1–4	—	—	3–0	4–0	—	—	6–0
Peñarol	—	1–1	—	1–0	—	—	4–1	1–0	—	1–1	—	—	2–2	2–2	5–0	—
Plaza Colonia	—	—	—	0–1	—	2–2	—	1–2	—	—	0–1	—	—	4–1	0–1	1–0
Progreso	1–1	—	—	—	0–3	3–0	1–0	—	2–2	—	—	0–1	—	—	—	4–0
Racing	—	1–3	1–0	0–2	4–2	—	2–1	—	2–4	1–1	—	—	3–0	—	—	—
Rampla Juniors	—	2–0	2–1	0–0	0–2	—	—	2–0	—	0–3	—	—	3–4	2–0	—	—
River Plate	—	2–1	—	1–1	—	2–2	—	0–0	—	—	0–2	—	—	4–1	2–1	—

Source: AUF, Soccerway
Legend: Blue = home team win; Yellow = draw; Red = away team win.

=== Top goalscorers ===
Rank	Name	Club	Goals
1	(Uruguay) Leonardo Fernández	Fénix	12
2	(Uruguay) Sebastián Sosa	Cerro Largo	11
2	(Uruguay) Joaquín Zeballos	Juventud	11
4	(Uruguay) Maximiliano Pérez	Fénix	9
4	(Uruguay) Juan Ignacio Ramírez	Liverpool	9
6	(Argentina) Gonzalo Bergessio	Nacional	8
7	(Uruguay) Carlos Grossmüller	Danubio	7
7	(Uruguay) Rodrigo Pastorini	Montevideo Wanderers	7
7	(Uruguay) Maximiliano Pérez	Boston River	7
7	(Panama) Cecilio Waterman	Plaza Colonia	7

Source: Soccerway

== Torneo Intermedio ==
The Torneo Intermedio was the second tournament of the 2019 season, played between the Apertura and Clausura tournaments. It consisted of two groups whose composition depended on the final standings of the Torneo Apertura: teams in odd-numbered positions played in Serie A, and teams in even-numbered positions played in Serie B. It started on 13 July and concluded on 8 September, with the winners being granted a berth into the 2020 Copa Sudamericana and the 2020 Supercopa Uruguaya.

=== Serie A ===
Pos	Team	Pld	W	D	L	GF	GA	GD	Pts	Qualification	RIV	NAC	PRO	PEÑ	DFS	JUV	BOR	DAN
1	River Plate	7	4	3	0	7	3	+4	15	Advance to Torneo Intermedio Final	—	—	0–0	1–0	2–1	—	—	—
2	Nacional	7	4	2	1	13	6	+7	14		1–1	—	4–2	3–0	1–2	—	—	—
3	Progreso	7	2	4	1	9	7	+2	10		—	—	—	1–1	3–1	0–0	—	2–0
4	Peñarol	7	2	3	2	9	7	+2	9		—	—	—	—	—	0–0	4–0	2–0
5	Defensor Sporting	7	2	3	2	12	12	0	9		—	—	—	2–2	—	1–1	2–2	3–1
6	Juventud	7	1	4	2	5	7	−2	7		1–2	0–2	—	—	—	—	1–0	2–2
7	Boston River	7	1	4	2	5	9	−4	7		0–0	0–0	1–1	—	—	—	—	—
8	Danubio	7	0	1	6	5	14	−9	1		0–1	1–2	—	—	—	—	1–2	—

Source: AUF, Soccerway
Legend: Blue = home team win; Yellow = draw; Red = away team win.
Rules for classification: 1) Points, 2) Goal difference, 3) Goals for, 4) Head-to-head record, 5) Drawing of lots, 6) Playoff game, in case two teams are tied for first place.

=== Serie B ===
Pos	Team	Pld	W	D	L	GF	GA	GD	Pts	Qualification	LIV	CRL	PCO	FNX	RAJ	CRR	RAC	WAN
1	Liverpool	7	6	0	1	18	5	+13	18	Advance to Torneo Intermedio Final	—	—	3–0	5–1	—	—	3–1	3–1
2	Cerro Largo	7	5	1	1	11	5	+6	16		1–0	—	—	1–0	—	2–0	3–0	—
3	Plaza Colonia	7	4	1	2	9	7	+2	13		—	3–1	—	—	1–2	0–0	—	2–1
4	Fénix	7	3	0	4	7	10	−3	9		—	—	0–1	—	1–0	—	—	3–0
5	Rampla Juniors	7	2	1	4	11	12	−1	7		1–2	1–1	—	—	—	0–1	—	—
6	Cerro	7	2	1	4	3	7	−4	7		0–2	—	—	0–1	—	—	1–2	—
7	Racing	7	2	1	4	10	16	−6	7		—	—	0–2	3–1	2–4	—	—	2–2
8	Montevideo Wanderers	7	1	1	5	9	16	−7	4		—	1–2	—	—	4–3	0–1	—	—

Source: AUF, Soccerway
Legend: Blue = home team win; Yellow = draw; Red = away team win.
Rules for classification: 1) Points, 2) Goal difference, 3) Goals for, 4) Head-to-head record, 5) Drawing of lots, 6) Playoff game, in case two teams are tied for first place.

=== Torneo Intermedio Final ===
8 September 2019
15:00

Liverpool	2–2 (a.e.t.)	River Plate
Ramírez 20'; Olivera 97'	Report	Piquerez 69'; Viera 110'
Penalties
Olivera (penalty scored); Martínez (penalty scored); Ramírez (penalty missed); Cándido (penalty scored); Acevedo (penalty scored); Caballero (penalty scored)	5–4	(penalty scored) Alonso; (penalty scored) Rodríguez; (penalty scored) Leites; (penalty missed) Fernández; (penalty scored) Piquerez; (penalty missed) Píriz

Estadio Luis Franzini, Montevideo
Referee: Andrés Matonte

=== Top goalscorers ===
Rank	Name	Club	Goals
1	(Uruguay) Juan Ignacio Ramírez	Liverpool	9
2	(Argentina) Mariano Pavone	Defensor Sporting	6
3	(Argentina) Gonzalo Bergessio	Nacional	5
4	(Uruguay) Jonathan Dos Santos	Cerro Largo	4
4	(Uruguay) Federico Martínez	Liverpool	4
4	(Uruguay) Nicolás Sosa	Racing	4
4	(Panama) Cecilio Waterman	Plaza Colonia	4

Source: Soccerway

== Torneo Clausura ==
The Torneo Clausura, named "Sr. Franz Oppenheimer", was the third and last tournament of the 2019 season. It began on 14 September and ended on 11 December.

=== Standings ===
Pos	Team	Pld	W	D	L	GF	GA	GD	Pts	Qualification
1	Nacional	15	11	1	3	27	10	+17	34	Qualification for Torneo Clausura decider
2	Peñarol	15	10	4	1	21	10	+11	34	Qualification for Torneo Clausura decider
3	Progreso (Note: Progreso were awarded two points and Cerro were deducted one point due to Cerro fielding the ineligible player Martín González during the Torneo Clausura match between both teams.)	15	9	4	2	22	14	+8	33	
4	Plaza Colonia	15	9	2	4	16	9	+7	29	
5	Cerro Largo	15	8	2	5	22	17	+5	26	
6	River Plate	15	6	4	5	20	19	+1	22	
7	Liverpool	15	5	6	4	14	13	+1	21	
8	Boston River	15	6	3	6	18	19	−1	21	
9	Defensor Sporting	15	6	2	7	25	22	+3	20	
10	Montevideo Wanderers	15	5	4	6	19	18	+1	19	
11	Racing	15	4	3	8	20	26	−6	15	
12	Cerro	15	4	3	8	14	22	−8	14	
13	Danubio	15	3	4	8	14	21	−7	13	
14	Juventud	15	2	5	8	13	23	−10	11	
15	Fénix	15	2	5	8	16	27	−11	11	
16	Rampla Juniors	15	2	4	9	16	28	−12	10	

Source: AUF, Soccerway
Rules for classification: 1) Points, 2) Playoff game, in case two teams are tied for first place.
If there are more than two teams tied in points: 2) Goal difference, 3) Goals for, 4) Head-to-head record, 5) Drawing of lots, 6) Playoff game, in case two teams are still tied for first place.

=== Results ===
Home \ Away	BOR	CRR	CRL	DAN	DFS	FNX	JUV	LIV	WAN	NAC	PEÑ	PCO	PRO	RAC	RAJ	RIV
Boston River	—	2–2	—	3–1	1–4	—	2–1	—	1–3	0–2	—	—	1–1	—	—	—
Cerro	—	—	0–2	0–1	—	1–0	—	0–2	—	—	1–3	—	—	1–0	0–1	3–2
Cerro Largo	1–0	—	—	—	1–4	—	2–0	1–1	0–2	—	—	—	—	2–1	5–1	—
Danubio	—	—	1–2	—	—	1–1	—	1–2	—	—	0–2	0–1	—	3–2	1–1	1–1
Defensor Sporting	—	1–1	—	1–2	—	—	—	0–0	—	2–1	—	—	2–4	4–0	1–0	—
Fénix	1–2	—	1–1	—	3–2	—	2–2	—	3–3	—	—	0–2	1–2	—	—	1–0
Juventud	—	4–2	—	0–0	1–3	—	—	0–0	—	0–3	1–1	—	1–2	0–0	—	—
Liverpool	0–0	—	—	—	—	1–1	—	—	2–2	—	1–0	0–1	—	—	1–0	0–1
Montevideo Wanderers	—	0–2	—	2–1	2–0	—	3–0	—	—	0–1	—	—	0–1	0–2	—	—
Nacional	—	2–0	0–1	1–0	—	2–0	—	4–1	—	—	0–0	—	—	3–0	4–3	—
Peñarol	1–0	—	2–1	—	1–0	2–1	—	—	1–0	—	—	2–1	—	—	—	1–0
Plaza Colonia	1–0	1–0	1–0	—	4–1	—	1–0	—	0–0	0–2	—	—	0–1	—	—	—
Progreso	—	1–1	0–1	2–1	—	—	—	2–1	—	0–1	0–0	—	—	2–1	2–2	—
Racing	0–1	—	—	—	—	4–1	—	0–2	—	—	3–3	3–2	—	—	3–1	1–1
Rampla Juniors	0–1	—	—	—	—		1–3	—	1–1	—	1–2	0–1	—	—	—	2–2
River Plate	1–4	—	3–2	—	1–0	—	1–0	—	3–1	3–1	—	0–0	1–2	—	—	—

Source: AUF, Soccerway
Legend: Blue = home team win; Yellow = draw; Red = away team win.

=== Torneo Clausura decider ===
Since Nacional and Peñarol ended up tied in points for first place, an additional match was played by both teams to decide the Torneo Clausura winners. Nacional won this match and qualified for the semifinal.

11 December 2019
20:30

Peñarol	0–2	Nacional
	Report	Castro 61'; Corujo 66'

Estadio Centenario, Montevideo
Referee: Andrés Matonte

=== Top goalscorers ===
Rank	Name	Club	Goals
1	(Argentina) Gonzalo Bergessio	Nacional	7
1	(Uruguay) Jonathan Dos Santos	Cerro Largo	7
3	(Uruguay) Facundo Rodríguez	Boston River	6
3	(Uruguay) Nicolás Sosa	Racing	6
3	(Panama) Cecilio Waterman	Plaza Colonia	6
3	(Uruguay) Joaquín Zeballos	Juventud	6
7	(Argentina) Matías Castro	Montevideo Wanderers	5
7	(Brazil) Léo Coelho	Fénix	5
7	(Uruguay) Agustín González	Progreso	5
7	(Spain) Xisco Jiménez	Peñarol	5
7	(Uruguay) Juan Manuel Olivera	River Plate	5
7	(Uruguay) Juan Ignacio Ramírez	Liverpool	5

Source: Soccerway

== Aggregate table ==
The aggregate table includes the results of the three stages played throughout the season: Torneo Apertura, Torneo Intermedio, and Torneo Clausura. The top team at the end of the season will qualify for the finals of the championship playoff.

Pos	Team	Pld	W	D	L	GF	GA	GD	Pts	Qualification
1	Nacional (C)	37	22	9	6	72	33	+39	75	Qualification for Championship playoff and Copa Libertadores group stage
2	Peñarol	37	21	11	5	58	27	+31	74	Qualification for Championship playoff and Copa Libertadores group stage
3	Cerro Largo	37	21	6	10	56	34	+22	69	Qualification for Copa Libertadores second stage
4	Progreso (Note: Progreso were awarded two points and Cerro were deducted one point due to Cerro fielding the ineligible player Martín González during the Torneo Clausura match between both teams.)	37	17	12	8	58	46	+12	65	Qualification for Copa Libertadores first stage
5	Liverpool	37	16	11	10	61	47	+14	59	Qualification for Copa Sudamericana first stage
6	Plaza Colonia	37	16	8	13	40	37	+3	56	Qualification for Copa Sudamericana first stage
7	River Plate	37	13	12	12	41	52	−11	51	Qualification for Copa Sudamericana first stage
8	Fénix	37	13	9	15	60	63	−3	48	Qualification for Copa Sudamericana first stage
9	Boston River	37	12	12	13	41	50	−9	48	
10	Montevideo Wanderers	37	12	10	15	49	56	−7	46	
11	Defensor Sporting	37	12	9	16	58	61	−3	45	
12	Danubio	37	11	8	18	41	52	−11	41	
13	Racing	37	10	7	20	50	72	−22	37	
14	Rampla Juniors	37	9	8	20	44	62	−18	35	
15	Cerro	37	9	7	21	31	52	−21	33	
16	Juventud	37	7	11	19	39	52	−13	32	

Source: AUF
Rules for classification: 1) Points, 2) Playoff game, in case two teams are tied for first place.
If there are more than two teams tied in points: 2) Goal difference, 3) Goals for, 4) Head-to-head record, 5) Drawing of lots, 6) Playoff game, in case two teams are still tied for first place.
(C) Champions

== Championship play-off ==
Semi-final		Finals
		Nacional (Semifinal winners)	—	—	—
Peñarol (Apertura winners)	0	Nacional (Aggregate table first place)	—	—	—
Nacional (Clausura winners)	1

=== Semi-final ===
15 December 2019
17:00

Nacional	1–0	Peñarol
Zunino 80'	Report

Estadio Centenario, Montevideo
Referee: Andrés Cunha

=== Final ===
Since Nacional, who had the best record in the aggregate table, won the semi-final, they became champions automatically and the final was not played. Peñarol became runners-up as the second-placed team in the aggregate table. Both teams qualified for the 2020 Copa Libertadores group stage.

Primera División
2019 Champions
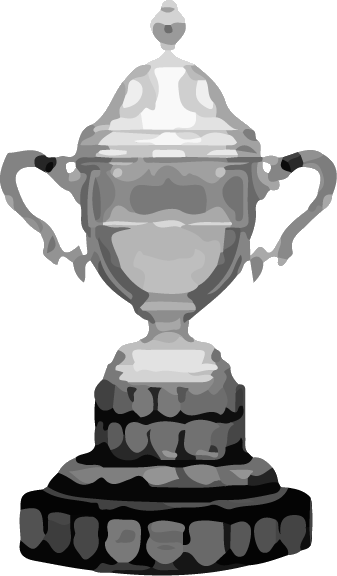

47th title

== Relegation ==
Relegation is determined at the end of the season by computing an average of the number of points earned per game over the two most recent seasons: 2018 and 2019. The three teams with the lowest average were relegated to the Segunda División for the following season.

Pos	Team	2018 Pts	2019 Pts	Total Pts	Total Pld	Avg	Relegation
1	Peñarol	84	74	158	73	2.164	
2	Nacional	85	75	160	74	2.162	
3	Cerro Largo	—	69	69	37	1.865	
4	Liverpool	58	59	117	74	1.581	
5	Progreso	49	65	114	73	1.562	
6	Plaza Colonia	—	56	56	37	1.514	
7	Defensor Sporting	58	45	103	73	1.411	
8	River Plate	49	51	100	73	1.37	
9	Montevideo Wanderers	55	46	101	74	1.365	
10	Danubio	60	41	101	74	1.365	
11	Cerro	59	33	92	74	1.243	
12	Fénix	43	48	91	74	1.23	
13	Boston River	37	48	85	73	1.164	
14	Racing (R)	47	37	84	74	1.135	Relegation to Segunda División
15	Rampla Juniors (R)	37	35	72	74	0.973	Relegation to Segunda División
16	Juventud (R)	—	33	33	37	0.892	Relegation to Segunda División
