= 2020 Campeonato Uruguayo Primera División =

117th season of the top-tier football league in Uruguay

Liga Profesional de Primera División
- Season: 2020
- Dates: 15 February 2020 – 7 April 2021
- Champions: Nacional (48th title)
- Relegated: Defensor Sporting; Danubio; Cerro
- Copa Libertadores: Nacional; Rentistas; Montevideo Wanderers; Liverpool
- Copa Sudamericana: Peñarol; Montevideo City Torque; Cerro Largo; Fénix
- Matches: 301
- Goals: 777 (2.58 per match)
- Top goalscorer: Gonzalo Bergessio (25 goals)
- Biggest home win: Fénix 5–0 Defensor Sporting (23 August 2020); Boston River 5–0 Dep. Maldonado (18 January 2021); Plaza Colonia 5–0 Rentistas (1 March 2021)
- Biggest away win: Wanderers 2–8 Torque (5 March 2021)
- Highest scoring: Wanderers 2–8 Torque (5 March 2021)

The 2020 Liga Profesional de Primera División season, also known as the Campeonato Uruguayo de Primera División 2020, was the 117th season of the Uruguayan Primera División, Uruguay's top-flight football league, and the 90th in which it is professional. The season, named as "Néstor "Tito" Gonçalves", began on 15 February 2020 and ended on 7 April 2021. Nacional were the defending champions, having won the title in the previous season and successfully defended their title in this season by defeating Rentistas in the finals by a 4–0 score on aggregate, thus claiming their 48th Primera División title.

The competition was suspended from 13 March to 8 August 2020 due to the COVID-19 pandemic.

== Teams ==
Locations of the 2020 season teams outside Montevideo.
Locations of the 2020 Primera División teams within Montevideo.

The three lowest placed teams in the relegation table of the 2019 season, Racing, Rampla Juniors, and Juventud, were relegated to the Segunda División for the 2020 season. They were replaced by Montevideo City Torque, Deportivo Maldonado, and Rentistas, who were promoted from the Segunda División.

Club	Manager	City	Stadium	Capacity
Boston River	(Uruguay) Juan Tejera	Florida	Campeones Olímpicos	7,000
Boston River	(Uruguay) Juan Tejera	Montevideo	Parque Capurro (Note: Used by Boston River for their Torneo Apertura home match against Montevideo Wanderers.)	10,000
Boston River	(Uruguay) Juan Tejera	Montevideo	Centenario (Note: Used by Boston River for their home matches since the resumption of the league following the COVID-19 pandemic.)	60,235
Boston River	(Uruguay) Juan Tejera	Montevideo	Parque Abraham Paladino (Note: Used by Boston River for their Torneo Apertura home match against Nacional.)	8,800
Cerro	(Argentina) Rolando Carlen	Montevideo	Luis Tróccoli	24,000
Cerro Largo	(Uruguay) Danielo Núñez	Melo	Antonio Ubilla	9,000
Danubio	(Uruguay) Leonardo Ramos	Montevideo	Jardines del Hipódromo	18,000
Defensor Sporting	(Uruguay) Eduardo Acevedo	Montevideo	Luis Franzini	18,000
Deportivo Maldonado	(Uruguay) Francisco Palladino	Maldonado	Domingo Burgueño Miguel	22,000
Fénix	(Uruguay) Juan Ramón Carrasco	Montevideo	Parque Capurro	10,000
Fénix	(Uruguay) Juan Ramón Carrasco	Montevideo	Charrúa (Note: Used by Fénix for their Torneo Apertura home match against Progreso.)	14,000
Liverpool	(Uruguay) Marcelo Méndez	Montevideo	Belvedere	10,000
Montevideo City Torque	(Argentina) Pablo Marini	Montevideo	Centenario	60,235
Montevideo City Torque	(Argentina) Pablo Marini	Montevideo	Parque Capurro (Note: Used by Montevideo City Torque for their Torneo Apertura home match against Cerro.)	10,000
Montevideo City Torque	(Argentina) Pablo Marini	Montevideo	Charrúa (Note: Used by Montevideo City Torque for their home matches since the resumption of the league following the COVID-19 pandemic.)	14,000
Montevideo Wanderers	(Uruguay) Daniel Carreño	Montevideo	Parque Alfredo Víctor Viera	11,000
Nacional	(Uruguay) Martín Ligüera (caretaker)	Montevideo	Gran Parque Central	34,000
Nacional	(Uruguay) Martín Ligüera (caretaker)	Montevideo	Centenario (Note: Used by Nacional for their Torneo Apertura home matches against Cerro Largo and Peñarol.)	60,235
Peñarol	(Uruguay) Mauricio Larriera	Montevideo	Campeón del Siglo	40,000
Plaza Colonia	(Uruguay) Eduardo Espinel	Colonia	Parque Juan Prandi	4,500
Progreso	(Uruguay) Maximiliano Viera	Montevideo	Parque Abraham Paladino	8,000
Rentistas	(Uruguay) Alejandro Cappuccio	Montevideo	Complejo Rentistas	10,600
Rentistas	(Uruguay) Alejandro Cappuccio	Montevideo	Centenario (Note: Used by Rentistas for their Torneo Apertura home match against Nacional.)	60,235
River Plate	(Uruguay) Jorge Fossati	Montevideo	Parque Federico Omar Saroldi	6,000

=== Managerial changes ===
Team	Outgoing manager	Manner of departure	Date of vacancy	Position in table	Incoming manager	Date of appointment
Torneo Apertura
Cerro	(Uruguay) Fernando Gentile	End of caretaker spell	5 December 2019	Pre-season	(Uruguay) Nathaniel Revetria	28 December 2019
Liverpool	(Uruguay) Osvaldo Canobbio	End of caretaker spell	5 December 2019	Pre-season	(Uruguay) Román Cuello	12 December 2019
Defensor Sporting	(Uruguay) Ignacio Risso	Sacked	12 December 2019	Pre-season	(Uruguay) Alejandro Orfila	21 December 2019
Montevideo Wanderers	(Uruguay) Alfredo Arias	Signed by Deportivo Cali	13 December 2019	Pre-season	(Uruguay) Mauricio Larriera	20 December 2019
Nacional	(Uruguay) Álvaro Gutiérrez	Resigned	17 December 2019	Pre-season	(Uruguay) Gustavo Munúa	20 December 2019
Peñarol	(Uruguay) Diego López	End of contract	17 December 2019	Pre-season	(Uruguay) Diego Forlán	20 December 2019
Danubio	(Uruguay) Mauricio Larriera	Sacked	19 December 2019	Pre-season	(Uruguay) Martín García	23 December 2019
Boston River	(Uruguay) Martín García	Signed by Danubio	23 December 2019	Pre-season	(Uruguay) Sebastián Abreu	26 December 2019
Danubio	(Uruguay) Martín García	Sacked	22 August 2020	16th	(Uruguay) Leonardo Ramos	22 August 2020
Peñarol	(Uruguay) Diego Forlán	Sacked	31 August 2020	7th	(Uruguay) Mario Saralegui	31 August 2020
Cerro	(Uruguay) Nathaniel Revetria	Sacked	7 September 2020	16th	(Uruguay) Juan Jacinto Rodríguez (caretaker)	8 September 2020
Montevideo Wanderers	(Uruguay) Mauricio Larriera	Resigned	10 October 2020	6th	(Uruguay) Daniel Carreño	12 October 2020
Liverpool	(Uruguay) Román Cuello	Sacked	12 October 2020	9th	(Uruguay) Gustavo Ferrín (caretaker)	15 October 2020
Torneo Intermedio
Nacional	(Uruguay) Gustavo Munúa	Sacked	15 October 2020	Pre-tournament	(Uruguay) Jorge Giordano	15 October 2020 (Note: Originally as caretaker manager, appointed on a permanent basis on 29 December 2020.)
Liverpool	(Uruguay) Gustavo Ferrín	End of caretaker spell	18 October 2020	2nd, Serie A	(Uruguay) Marcelo Méndez	18 October 2020
Progreso	(Uruguay) Leonel Rocco	Signed by Atlético San Luis	2 November 2020	3rd, Serie A	(Uruguay) Gastón Añón	2 November 2020
Boston River	(Uruguay) Sebastián Abreu	Resigned	9 November 2020	7th, Serie B	(Uruguay) Fernando Rodino (caretaker)	9 November 2020
Boston River	(Uruguay) Fernando Rodino	End of caretaker spell	11 November 2020	5th, Serie B	(Uruguay) Juan Tejera	11 November 2020
Defensor Sporting	(Uruguay) Alejandro Orfila	Sacked	12 November 2020	6th, Serie B	(Uruguay) Gregorio Pérez	14 November 2020
Peñarol	(Uruguay) Mario Saralegui	End of contract	31 December 2020	3rd, Serie B	(Uruguay) Mauricio Larriera	31 December 2020
Cerro	(Uruguay) Juan Jacinto Rodríguez	End of caretaker spell	6 January 2021	8th, Serie A	(Argentina) Rolando Carlen	12 January 2021
Torneo Clausura
Plaza Colonia	(Uruguay) Matías Rosa	Mutual consent	30 January 2021	11th	(Uruguay) Eduardo Espinel	31 January 2021
Progreso	(Uruguay) Gastón Añón	Resigned	9 February 2021	15th	(Uruguay) Maximiliano Viera	10 February 2021
Defensor Sporting	(Uruguay) Gregorio Pérez	Sacked	13 March 2021	12th	(Uruguay) Eduardo Acevedo	13 March 2021
Nacional	(Uruguay) Jorge Giordano	Sacked	22 March 2021	4th	(Uruguay) Martín Ligüera (caretaker)	22 March 2021

== Effects of the COVID-19 pandemic ==
On 12 March 2020, Uruguayan Football Association president Ignacio Alonso announced that the fourth round of the Torneo Apertura, scheduled for the weekend of 14–15 March, would be played behind closed doors. In his statement through social media, Alonso said that the decision had been made in conjunction with the Uruguayan government in conversations with President Luis Lacalle Pou and National Secretary for Sport Sebastián Bauzá. However, the next day, following the suspension of all public events until further notice ordered by the Uruguayan government due to the COVID-19 pandemic, the AUF announced the indefinite suspension of all of its tournaments, including the Primera División.

On 22 May, the health protocol elaborated by the AUF in conjunction with four physicians was approved by 13 out of the 16 Primera División clubs. On 4 June, Uruguay's Ministry of Public Health approved the health protocol submitted by AUF on 26 May for the return of activity. The protocol contemplated the application of COVID-19 tests in every club from 8 to 10 June, and the start of individual training on 15 June, with the competition being set to resume between 1 and 15 August, pending final approval from the Uruguayan government.

Despite the AUF's efforts to resume competition on 1 August, on 15 July, following a meeting between representatives from the Uruguayan government and the governing body, it was confirmed that the tournament would resume on 8 August 2020.

On 26 September, the match between Liverpool and Nacional scheduled for that same day was suspended due to the presence of one positive COVID-19 case in Nacional's squad, which prompted the Ministry of Public Health to decree a mandatory quarantine for the entire team. The match was eventually rescheduled by AUF to 3 October.

The fifth round of the Torneo Intermedio, originally scheduled to be held in the weekend of 14–15 November, was postponed after the entire squads of Danubio and Boston River were forced to isolate by health authorities due to Danubio footballer Rodrigo Piñeiro testing positive for COVID-19. Further Torneo Intermedio matches involving Danubio, Defensor Sporting, and Rentistas, as well as the tournament's final between Nacional and Montevideo Wanderers were also postponed due to the confirmation of COVID-19 cases in those teams.

With the repeated suspensions and postponements of matches and rounds of the tournament due to the COVID-19 pandemic causing the extension of the 2020 season to April 2021, meaning that the league would not be concluded before the start of the Copa Libertadores and Copa Sudamericana qualifying stages, on 14 January 2021 the League Council of the Uruguayan Football Association approved a temporary modification to the method of qualification to CONMEBOL competitions of Uruguayan clubs. Since associations must formally inform CONMEBOL of the clubs that will take part in international competition in advance to the start of competition, some international berths were decided based on deadlines set according to the dates the respective Copa Libertadores and Copa Sudamericana rounds were scheduled to be held on as well as the placements of clubs in the aggregate table at the time of those deadlines.

In that vein, the Uruguay 4 and Uruguay 3 berths to the Copa Libertadores, which are usually awarded to the best clubs in the aggregate table other than the league champions and runners-up, were awarded to the best eligible clubs in the aggregate table as of 7 and 21 February 2021, respectively, considering that the Copa Libertadores first and second stages were scheduled to begin on 23 February and 9 March 2021, respectively. In all cases, clubs were offered the chance to accept or decline the berths they were eligible for at the time of the respective deadlines.

== Torneo Apertura ==
The Torneo Apertura, named "Sr. Mateo Giri", was the first tournament of the 2020 season. It began on 15 February and concluded on 14 October 2020.

=== Standings ===
Pos	Team	Pld	W	D	L	GF	GA	GD	Pts	Qualification
1	Nacional	15	7	7	1	27	16	+11	28	Qualification for Torneo Apertura decider
2	Rentistas	15	7	7	1	26	15	+11	28	Qualification for Torneo Apertura decider
3	Montevideo City Torque	15	7	4	4	21	16	+5	25	
4	Peñarol	15	6	6	3	19	15	+4	24	
5	Cerro Largo	15	6	6	3	19	17	+2	24	
6	Defensor Sporting	15	5	6	4	16	20	−4	21	
7	Montevideo Wanderers	15	5	5	5	16	16	0	20	
8	Deportivo Maldonado	15	5	5	5	16	20	−4	20	
9	Liverpool	15	5	4	6	22	25	−3	19	
10	Fénix	15	3	9	3	19	17	+2	18	
11	Progreso	15	4	4	7	21	20	+1	16	
12	River Plate	15	3	6	6	17	18	−1	15	
13	Plaza Colonia	15	3	6	6	14	18	−4	15	
14	Danubio	15	3	5	7	12	17	−5	14	
15	Cerro	15	3	5	7	13	21	−8	14	
16	Boston River	15	2	7	6	14	21	−7	13	

Source: AUF, Soccerway
Rules for classification: 1) Points, 2) Playoff game, in case two teams are tied for first place.
If there are more than two teams tied in points: 2) Goal difference, 3) Goals for, 4) Head-to-head record, 5) Drawing of lots, 6) Playoff game, in case two teams are still tied for first place.

=== Results ===
Home \ Away	BOR	CRR	CRL	DAN	DFS	DMA	FNX	LIV	MCT	WAN	NAC	PEÑ	PCO	PRO	REN	RIV
Boston River	—	—	—	—	1–1	—	0–0	—	—	0–2	1–1	—	0–0	—	2–3	1–1
Cerro	2–1	—	—	1–2	—	—	2–2	—	—	1–1	—	—	1–0	—	1–0	0–0
Cerro Largo	0–0	2–1	—	1–0	—	—	0–0	4–3	1–1	—	—	—	—	—	1–1	2–1
Danubio	2–2	—	—	—	0–0	—	2–0	—	—	0–1	—	—	0–1	—	1–1	1–3
Defensor Sporting	—	1–1	2–0	—	—	4–2	—	—	0–2	—	1–1	2–1	—	2–1	—	—
Deportivo Maldonado	1–2	1–0	1–1	0–0	—	—	—	—	0–3	—	—	2–0	—	1–0	—	—
Fénix	—	—	—	—	5–0	1–0	—	—	1–3	—	1–2	0–0	—	1–1	—	—
Liverpool	3–2	1–0	—	2–1	1–2	1–1	2–2	—	—	—	1–3	—	1–0	1–1	—	—
Montevideo City Torque	2–0	1–1	—	1–2	—	—	—	2–1	—	2–1	—	—	—	1–3	1–3	1–0
Montevideo Wanderers	—	—	1–0	—	0–0	2–2	1–2	2–0	—	—	2–2	—	1–2	—	—	0–2
Nacional	—	5–1	2–2	2–0	—	1–1	—	—	2–0	—	—	1–1	—	2–1	—	—
Peñarol	2–0	2–1	2–0	1–1	—	—	—	3–2	0–0	0–2	—	—	—	2–1	2–2	—
Plaza Colonia	—	—	1–3	—	2–0	1–2	1–1	—	1–1	—	0–0	1–3	—	—	—	—
Progreso	1–2	2–0	1–2	1–0	—	—	—	—	—	3–0	—	—	2–2	—	2–2	1–2
Rentistas	—	—	—	—	2–0	4–1	1–1	1–1	—	0–0	2–0	—	2–1	—	—	2–1
River Plate	—	—	—	—	1–1	0–1	2–2	1–2	—	—	2–3	0–0	1–1	—	—	—

Source: AUF, Soccerway
Legend: Blue = home team win; Yellow = draw; Red = away team win.

=== Torneo Apertura decider ===
Since Nacional and Rentistas ended up tied in points for first place, an additional match was played by both teams to decide the Torneo Apertura winners. The winners qualified for the semifinal of the championship playoff.

14 October 2020
20:00

Nacional	0–1 (a.e.t.)	Rentistas
	Report	Vega 91'

Estadio Centenario, Montevideo
Attendance: 0
Referee: Daniel Rodríguez

== Torneo Intermedio ==
The Torneo Intermedio was the second tournament of the 2020 season, played between the Apertura and Clausura tournaments. It consisted of two groups whose composition depended on the final standings of the Torneo Apertura: teams in odd-numbered positions played in Serie A, and teams in even-numbered positions played in Serie B. It started on 17 October 2020 and ended on 14 January 2021, with the winners being granted a berth into the 2021 Copa Sudamericana and the 2021 Supercopa Uruguaya.

=== Serie A ===
Pos	Team	Pld	W	D	L	GF	GA	GD	Pts	Qualification	WAN	LIV	MCT	CRL	REN	PRO	PCO	CRR
1	Montevideo Wanderers	7	4	2	1	13	8	+5	14	Advance to Torneo Intermedio Final	—	—	—	1–0	2–2	3–0	2–2	—
2	Liverpool	7	3	3	1	14	12	+2	12		2–3	—	2–2	—	—	—	—	3–2
3	Montevideo City Torque	7	3	1	3	13	10	+3	10		1–2	—	—	—	2–1	1–2	—	3–0
4	Cerro Largo	7	2	4	1	8	5	+3	10		—	1–1	2–1	—	—	—	—	0–0
5	Rentistas	7	2	3	2	7	6	+1	9		—	1–2	—	0–0	—	—	1–0	—
6	Progreso	7	1	4	2	7	10	−3	7		—	1–2	—	2–2	0–0	—	0–0	—
7	Plaza Colonia	7	1	3	3	8	11	−3	6		—	2–2	1–3	0–3	—	—	—	3–0
8	Cerro	7	1	2	4	5	13	−8	5		1–0	—	—	—	0–2	2–2	—	—

Source: AUF, Soccerway
Legend: Blue = home team win; Yellow = draw; Red = away team win.
Rules for classification: 1) Points, 2) Goal difference, 3) Goals for, 4) Head-to-head record, 5) Drawing of lots, 6) Playoff game, in case two teams are tied for first place.

=== Serie B ===
Pos	Team	Pld	W	D	L	GF	GA	GD	Pts	Qualification	NAC	RIV	PEÑ	FNX	DAN	DMA	DFS	BOR
1	Nacional	7	5	0	2	11	6	+5	15	Advance to Torneo Intermedio Final	—	—	—	1–0	0–2	—	3–0	—
2	River Plate	7	4	1	2	14	8	+6	13		0–2	—	—	3–2	4–0	—	1–1	—
3	Peñarol	7	4	0	3	15	9	+6	12		3–2	1–2	—	—	—	4–1	—	2–0
4	Fénix	7	3	1	3	7	6	+1	10		—	—	1–0	—	—	1–1	—	2–0
5	Danubio	7	2	3	2	5	9	−4	9		—	—	1–4	1–0	—	—	0–0	0–0
6	Deportivo Maldonado	7	2	2	3	10	15	−5	8		1–2	2–1	—	—	1–1	—	3–1	—
7	Defensor Sporting	7	1	3	3	5	10	−5	6		—	—	2–1	0–1	—	—	—	1–1
8	Boston River	7	1	2	4	6	10	−4	5		0–1	0–3	—	—	—	5–1	—	—

Source: AUF, Soccerway
Legend: Blue = home team win; Yellow = draw; Red = away team win.
Rules for classification: 1) Points, 2) Goal difference, 3) Goals for, 4) Head-to-head record, 5) Drawing of lots, 6) Playoff game, in case two teams are tied for first place.

=== Torneo Intermedio Final ===
14 January 2021 (Note: The Torneo Intermedio final was originally scheduled for 20 December 2020, 20:00 local time, but was postponed due to the confirmation of a staff member of Nacional testing positive for COVID-19. It was eventually rescheduled for 14 January 2021, 20:00 local time.)
20:00

Nacional	0–0 (a.e.t.)	Montevideo Wanderers
	Report
Penalties
Bergessio (penalty scored); Corujo (penalty scored); Ocampo (penalty scored); Martínez (penalty scored)	4–1	(penalty missed) González; (penalty scored) Torres; (penalty missed) Bueno

Estadio Centenario, Montevideo
Attendance: 0
Referee: Yimmi Álvarez

== Torneo Clausura ==
The Torneo Clausura, named "Sr. Julio César Road", was the third and last tournament of the 2020 season. Due to the schedule disruptions caused by the COVID-19 pandemic, there was a proposal to change its format and play it with two groups of eight teams, akin to the Torneo Intermedio, however on 23 December 2020 the AUF's League Council decided to play it under its normal single-round robin format. It began on 16 January 2021 and ended on 29 March 2021.

=== Standings ===
Pos	Team	Pld	W	D	L	GF	GA	GD	Pts	Qualification
1	Liverpool	15	10	4	1	34	13	+21	34	Qualification for Championship playoff
2	Peñarol	15	8	5	2	20	12	+8	29	
3	Montevideo City Torque	15	7	5	3	30	14	+16	26	
4	Nacional	15	7	5	3	19	16	+3	26	
5	Plaza Colonia	15	7	4	4	28	16	+12	25	
6	Boston River	15	7	1	7	23	26	−3	22	
7	Fénix (Note: River Plate were awarded two points and Fénix were deducted one point due to Fénix fielding the ineligible player Bryan Olivera during the match between both teams.)	15	5	7	3	25	24	+1	21	
8	River Plate	15	5	4	6	19	23	−4	21	
9	Deportivo Maldonado	15	4	6	5	21	27	−6	18	
10	Montevideo Wanderers (Note: Montevideo Wanderers were awarded three points and Progreso were deducted three points due to Progreso fielding an ineligible player during the match between both teams.)	15	3	6	6	22	31	−9	18	
11	Cerro Largo	15	4	4	7	15	17	−2	16	
12	Progreso	15	5	3	7	17	22	−5	15	
13	Danubio	15	4	3	8	17	23	−6	15	
14	Cerro	15	3	5	7	16	21	−5	14	
15	Defensor Sporting	15	2	8	5	15	21	−6	14	
16	Rentistas	15	2	4	9	12	27	−15	10	

Source: AUF, Soccerway
Rules for classification: 1) Points, 2) Playoff game, in case two teams are tied for first place.
If there are more than two teams tied in points: 2) Goal difference, 3) Goals for, 4) Head-to-head record, 5) Drawing of lots, 6) Playoff game, in case two teams are still tied for first place.

=== Results ===
Home \ Away	BOR	CRR	CRL	DAN	DFS	DMA	FNX	LIV	MCT	WAN	NAC	PEÑ	PCO	PRO	REN	RIV
Boston River	—	2–0	2–1	1–5	—	5–0	—	1–0	0–3	—	—	1–2	—	2–3	—	—
Cerro	—	—	0–1	—	0–0	2–3	—	1–1	1–3	—	0–1	1–1	—	2–0	—	—
Cerro Largo	—	—	—	—	0–0	1–2	—	—	—	1–3	0–0	1–1	3–1	1–0	—	—
Danubio	—	2–1	0–3	—	—	2–2	—	0–1	0–4	—	2–1	0–1	—	0–1	—	—
Defensor Sporting	1–2	—	—	1–1	—	—	2–2	0–3	—	1–1	—	—	3–2	—	0–0	0–2
Deportivo Maldonado	—	—	—	—	2–1	—	0–2	2–4	—	1–1	1–2	—	1–1	—	3–1	1–2
Fénix	2–1	3–3	1–0	1–1	—	—	—	0–2	—	3–3	—	—	3–3	—	3–0	1–1
Liverpool	—	—	3–2	—	—	—	—	—	4–1	2–1	—	1–1	—	—	2–2	3–2
Montevideo City Torque	—	—	0–0	—	0–0	1–1	3–0	—	—	—	1–2	1–2	2–0	—	—	—
Montevideo Wanderers	2–2	1–1	—	2–0	—	—	—	—	2–8	—	—	0–1	—	1–3	3–2	—
Nacional	1–2	—	—	—	2–1	—	2–2	0–4	—	2–1	—	—	1–1	—	1–1	3–0
Peñarol	—	—	—	—	1–2	1–1	3–1	—	—	—	0–0	—	1–3	—	—	2–0
Plaza Colonia	3–0	2–1	—	3–0	—	—	—	0–0	—	3–0	—	—	—	0–1	5–0	1–0
Progreso	—	—	—	—	3–3	1–1	0–1	0–4	0–0	—	0–1	0–2	—	—	—	—
Rentistas	0–1	0–1	2–1	1–0	—	—	—	—	1–2	—	—	0–1	—	1–3	—	—
River Plate	3–1	1–2	2–0	0–4	—	—	—	—	1–1	1–1	—	—	—	3–2	1–1	—

Source: AUF, Soccerway
Legend: Blue = home team win; Yellow = draw; Red = away team win.

== Aggregate table ==
The aggregate table included the results of the three stages played throughout the season: Torneo Apertura, Torneo Intermedio, and Torneo Clausura. The top team of this table at the end of the season qualified for the finals of the championship playoff.

Pos	Team	Pld	W	D	L	GF	GA	GD	Pts	Qualification
1	Nacional (C)	37	19	12	6	56	39	+17	69	Qualification for Championship playoff and Copa Libertadores group stage
2	Liverpool	37	18	11	8	70	50	+20	65	Qualification for Championship playoff and Copa Libertadores first stage (Note: Liverpool qualified for the Copa Libertadores first stage by accepting the Uruguay 4 berth offered by the AUF on 8 February 2021.)
3	Peñarol	37	18	11	8	54	34	+20	65	Qualification for Copa Sudamericana first stage
4	Montevideo City Torque	37	17	10	10	64	40	+24	61	Qualification for Copa Sudamericana first stage
5	Montevideo Wanderers (Note: Montevideo Wanderers were awarded three points and Progreso were deducted three points due to Progreso fielding an ineligible player during the Torneo Clausura match between both teams.)	37	12	13	12	51	55	−4	52	Qualification for Copa Libertadores second stage (Note: Montevideo Wanderers qualified for the Copa Libertadores second stage by accepting the Uruguay 3 berth offered by the AUF on 22 February 2021.)
6	Cerro Largo	37	12	14	11	42	39	+3	50	Qualification for Copa Sudamericana first stage
7	Fénix (Note: River Plate were awarded two points and Fénix were deducted one point due to Fénix fielding the ineligible player Bryan Olivera during the Torneo Clausura match between both teams.)	37	11	17	9	51	47	+4	49	Qualification for Copa Sudamericana first stage
8	River Plate	37	12	11	14	50	49	+1	49	
9	Rentistas	37	11	14	12	45	48	−3	47	Qualification for Championship playoff and Copa Libertadores group stage
10	Plaza Colonia	37	11	13	13	50	45	+5	46	
11	Deportivo Maldonado	37	11	13	13	46	61	−15	46	
12	Defensor Sporting	37	8	17	12	36	51	−15	41	
13	Boston River	37	10	10	17	43	57	−14	40	
14	Progreso	37	10	11	16	45	52	−7	38	
15	Danubio	37	9	11	17	34	49	−15	38	
16	Cerro	37	7	12	18	34	55	−21	33	

Source: AUF
Rules for classification: 1) Points, 2) Playoff game, in case two teams are tied for first place.
If there are more than two teams tied in points: 2) Goal difference, 3) Goals for, 4) Head-to-head record, 5) Drawing of lots, 6) Playoff game, in case two teams are still tied for first place.
(C) Champions

== Championship playoff ==
Semi-final		Finals
		Rentistas (Semi-final winners)	0	0	0
Rentistas (Apertura winners) (p)	1 (3)	Nacional (Aggregate table first place)	3	1	4
Liverpool (Clausura winners)	1 (2)

=== Semi-final ===
31 March 2021
20:00 UTC−3

Rentistas	1–1 (a.e.t.)	Liverpool
Pérez 85'	Report	Cristóbal 79' (o.g.)
Penalties
Colazo (penalty scored); Villalba (penalty missed); Rodríguez (penalty scored); Acosta (penalty missed); Vega (penalty scored)	3–2	(penalty scored) Romero; (penalty scored) Ramírez; (penalty missed) Ocampo; (penalty missed) Cándido; (penalty missed) Almeida

Estadio Centenario, Montevideo
Attendance: 0
Referee: Andrés Matonte

=== Finals ===
4 April 2021
20:00 UTC−3

Nacional	3–0	Rentistas
Bergessio 7', 29'; Laborda 66'	Report

Estadio Gran Parque Central, Montevideo
Attendance: 0
Referee: Esteban Ostojich

7 April 2021
15:00 UTC−3

Rentistas	0–1	Nacional
	Report	Bergessio 41'

Estadio Complejo Rentistas, Montevideo
Attendance: 0
Referee: Christian Ferreyra

Nacional won 4–0 on aggregate.

Primera División
2020 Champions
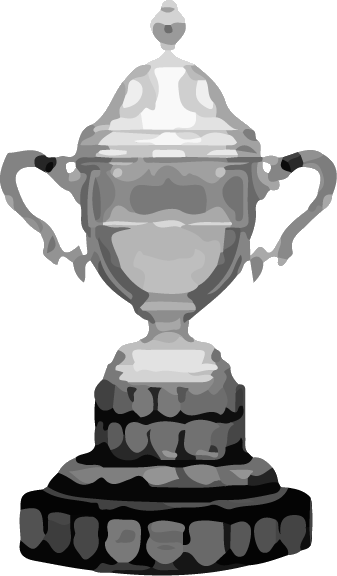

48th title

== Top goalscorers ==
Rank	Name	Club	Goals
1	(Argentina) Gonzalo Bergessio	Nacional	25
2	(Uruguay) Juan Ignacio Ramírez	Liverpool	24
3	(Uruguay) Maureen Franco	Fénix	18
4	(Uruguay) David Terans	Peñarol	16
5	(Uruguay) Gonzalo Vega	Rentistas	15
6	(Uruguay) Facundo Batista	Deportivo Maldonado	14
7	(Uruguay) Matías Arezo	River Plate	13
8	(Uruguay) Enzo Borges	Cerro Largo	12
8	(Uruguay) Matías Cóccaro	Montevideo City Torque	12
10	(Uruguay) Agustín Álvarez Martínez	Peñarol	10
10	(Uruguay) Rubén Bentancourt	Boston River	10
10	(Argentina) Gustavo Del Prete	Montevideo City Torque	10

Source: AUF

== Relegation ==
Relegation was determined at the end of the season by computing an average of the number of points earned per game over the two most recent seasons: 2019 and 2020. The three teams with the lowest average were relegated to the Segunda División for the following season.

Pos	Team	2019 Pts	2020 Pts	Total Pts	Total Pld	Avg	Relegation
1	Nacional	75	69	144	74	1.946	
2	Peñarol	74	65	139	74	1.878	
3	Liverpool	59	65	124	74	1.676	
4	Montevideo City Torque	—	61	61	37	1.649	
5	Cerro Largo	69	50	119	74	1.608	
6	Progreso	65	38	103	74	1.392	
7	Plaza Colonia	56	46	102	74	1.378	
8	River Plate	51	49	100	74	1.351	
9	Montevideo Wanderers	46	52	98	74	1.324	
10	Fénix	48	49	97	74	1.311	
11	Rentistas	—	47	47	37	1.27	
12	Deportivo Maldonado	—	46	46	37	1.243	
13	Boston River	48	40	88	74	1.189	
14	Defensor Sporting (R)	45	41	86	74	1.162	Relegation to Segunda División
15	Danubio (R)	41	38	79	74	1.068	Relegation to Segunda División
16	Cerro (R)	33	33	66	74	0.892	Relegation to Segunda División

== Season awards ==
On 23 April 2021 the AUF announced the winners of the season awards, who were chosen by its Technical Staff based on voting by managers and captains of the 16 Primera División teams as well as a group of local sports journalists. 37 players were nominated for Best Player and the Team of the Season according to their ratings and evaluations by the Technical Staff throughout the season.

Award	Winner	Club
Best Player	(Argentina) Gonzalo Bergessio	Nacional
Youth Talent	(Uruguay) Facundo Batista	Deportivo Maldonado
Best Goal	(Uruguay) Agustín Ocampo (against Cerro Largo, Torneo Clausura)	Liverpool
Best Save	(Uruguay) Sebastián Lentinelly (against Peñarol, Torneo Clausura)	Liverpool
Public's Player (Note: Chosen by public voting on the competition's social network accounts.)	(Uruguay) Facundo Torres	Peñarol
Best Manager	(Argentina) Pablo Marini	Montevideo City Torque
Best Newcomer	(Uruguay) Facundo Torres	Peñarol
Top Scorer	(Argentina) Gonzalo Bergessio (25 goals in 37 games played)	Nacional
Least beaten goal in regular season	Peñarol (36 goals conceded)	
Most minutes on field	(Uruguay) Gonzalo Falcón (3,240 minutes in 36 games played)	Boston River
Most minutes on field	(Argentina) Danilo Lerda (3,240 minutes in 36 games played)	Deportivo Maldonado
Fair Play Award	Boston River	

Team of the Season
Goalkeeper	(Uruguay) Sergio Rochet (Nacional)			
Defenders	(Uruguay) Franco Pizzichillo (Montevideo City Torque)	(Uruguay) Federico Pereira (Liverpool)	(Uruguay) Yonatthan Rak (Montevideo City Torque)	(Uruguay) Camilo Cándido (Liverpool)
Midfielders	(Uruguay) Gonzalo Vega (Rentistas)	(Uruguay) Hernán Figueredo (Liverpool)	(Uruguay) Emiliano Martínez (Nacional)	(Uruguay) David Terans (Peñarol)
Forwards	(Uruguay) Juan Ignacio Ramírez (Liverpool)		(Argentina) Gonzalo Bergessio (Nacional)	
Bench	(Uruguay) Sebastián Lentinelly (Liverpool)	(Uruguay) Franco Romero (Liverpool)	(Uruguay) Joaquín Piquerez (Peñarol)	(Uruguay) Felipe Carballo (Nacional)
Bench	(Chile) Marcelo Allende (Montevideo City Torque)	(Uruguay) Facundo Torres (Peñarol)	(Uruguay) Matías Arezo (River Plate)	(Uruguay) Facundo Batista (Deportivo Maldonado)
