= Pablo Siles =

Uruguayan footballer (born 1997)

Personal information
- Full name: Pablo Fabricio Siles Morales
- Date of birth: 15 July 1997 (age 29)
- Place of birth: Melo, Uruguay
- Height: 1.75 m (5 ft 9 in)
- Position: Midfielder

Team information
- Current team: Montevideo City Torque
- Number: 8

Youth career
- Danubio

Senior career*
Years	Team	Apps	(Gls)
2017–2021	Danubio	63	(0)
2021	→ Vitória (loan)	22	(2)
2022–2024	Athletico Paranaense	16	(1)
2022	→ Cruzeiro (loan)	5	(0)
2023	→ Chapecoense (loan)	12	(0)
2023	→ Liverpool Montevideo (loan)	14	(0)
2024	Huracán	10	(0)
2025–	Montevideo City Torque	30	(1)

International career
2019	Uruguay U22	2	(0)
- * Club domestic league appearances and goals as of 1 October 2025

Pablo Fabricio Siles Morales (born 15 July 1997) is a Uruguayan professional footballer who plays as a midfielder for Montevideo City Torque.

== Club career ==
A youth academy graduate of Danubio, Siles made his professional debut on 28 May 2017 in a 1–1 draw against Sud América. He scored his first goal on 12 February 2019 in a 3–2 Copa Libertadores defeat against Atlético Mineiro.

Following Danubio's relegation from top division after 2020 season, Siles joined Brazilian club Vitória on a season long loan deal.

== International career ==
Siles is a former Uruguay youth international. On 29 June 2019, he was named in Uruguay's 18-man squad for 2019 Pan American Games. He played two matches in group stage as Uruguay eventually finished fourth in the tournament.

== Career statistics ==
As of 8 November 2021

Appearances and goals by club, season and competition
Club	Season	League			Cup		Continental		Total	
Club	Season	Division	Apps	Goals	Apps	Goals	Apps	Goals	Apps	Goals
Danubio	2017	Uruguayan Primera División	8	0	—		0	0	8	0
Danubio	2018	Uruguayan Primera División	2	0	—		1 (Note: Appearance in Copa Sudamericana.)	0	3	0
Danubio	2019	Uruguayan Primera División	28	0	—		2 (Note: Appearances in Copa Libertadores.)	1	30	1
Danubio	2020	Uruguayan Primera División	25	0	—		—		25	0
Danubio	Total		63	0	0	0	3	1	66	1
Vitória (loan)	2021	Campeonato Brasileiro Série B	22	2	2	0	—		24	2
Career total			85	2	2	0	3	1	90	3

== Honours ==
Liverpool Montevideo

- Uruguayan Primera División: 2023
