= Darío Pereira =

Uruguayan footballer (born 1996)

Personal information
- Full name: Alfonso Darío Pereira D'Atri
- Date of birth: 25 February 1996 (age 30)
- Place of birth: Montevideo, Uruguay
- Height: 1.78 m (5 ft 10 in)
- Position: Midfielder

Youth career
- Huracán Belvedere
- Club de Pesca
- River Plate Montevideo
- 2009–2015: Rentistas

Senior career*
| Years | Team | Apps | (Gls) |
| 2015–2017 | Rentistas | 20 | (1) |
| 2016 | → Progreso (loan) | 4 | (0) |
| 2017–2022 | Montevideo City Torque | 123 | (12) |
| 2019 | → Tampico Madero (loan) | 3 | (0) |
- * Club domestic league appearances and goals as of 1 January 2023

Alfonso Darío Pereira D'Atri (born 25 February 1996) is a Uruguayan professional footballer who plays as a midfielder.

== Career ==
Pereira is a youth academy product of Rentistas. He made his professional debut on 2 September 2015, coming on as an 89th-minute substitute for David Terans in a 3–0 win against Juventud. He scored his first goal on 1 October 2016 in a 3–0 win against Progreso.

Pereira joined Montevideo Torque during 2017 Uruguayan Segunda División season. He scored five goals from 29 matches during Torque's first ever Primera División season in 2018. He also scored a brace in his side's 3–2 defeat against Nacional in Torneo Intermedio final. Following the relegation of Torque from Primera División, Pereira joined Mexican side Tampico Madero on loan for Clausura of 2018–19 Ascenso MX season.

== Career statistics ==
As of 14 September 2022

| Club | Season | League | | | Cup | | Continental | | Other | | Total | |
| Club | Season | Division | Apps | Goals | Apps | Goals | Apps | Goals | Apps | Goals | Apps | Goals |
|---|---|---|---|---|---|---|---|---|---|---|---|---|
| Rentistas | 2015–16 | Uruguayan Primera División | 3 | 0 | — | | — | | — | | 3 | 0 |
| Rentistas | 2016 | Uruguayan Segunda División | 10 | 1 | — | | — | | — | | 10 | 1 |
| Rentistas | 2017 | Uruguayan Segunda División | 7 | 0 | — | | — | | — | | 7 | 0 |
| Rentistas | Total | | 20 | 1 | 0 | 0 | 0 | 0 | 0 | 0 | 20 | 1 |
| Progreso (loan) | 2015–16 | Uruguayan Segunda División | 4 | 0 | — | | — | | — | | 4 | 0 |
| Montevideo City Torque | 2017 | Uruguayan Segunda División | 3 | 0 | — | | — | | — | | 3 | 0 |
| Montevideo City Torque | 2018 | Uruguayan Primera División | 28 | 3 | — | | — | | 1 (Note: Appearance in Torneo Intermedio final) | 2 | 29 | 5 |
| Montevideo City Torque | 2019 | Uruguayan Segunda División | 11 | 1 | — | | — | | — | | 11 | 1 |
| Montevideo City Torque | 2020 | Uruguayan Primera División | 34 | 4 | — | | — | | — | | 34 | 4 |
| Montevideo City Torque | 2021 | Uruguayan Primera División | 22 | 2 | — | | 7 (Note: Appearances in Copa Sudamericana) | 0 | — | | 29 | 2 |
| Montevideo City Torque | 2022 | Uruguayan Primera División | 25 | 2 | 1 | 0 | 2 (Note: Appearances in Copa Libertadores) | 0 | — | | 28 | 2 |
| Montevideo City Torque | Total | | 123 | 12 | 1 | 0 | 9 | 0 | 1 | 2 | 134 | 14 |
| Tampico Madero (loan) | 2018–19 | Ascenso MX | 3 | 0 | 1 | 0 | — | | — | | 4 | 0 |
| Career total | | | 150 | 13 | 2 | 0 | 9 | 0 | 1 | 2 | 162 | 15 |
