= Sebastián Lentinelly =

Uruguayan football player (born 1997)

Personal information
- Full name: Carlos Sebastián Lentinelly Villavicencio
- Date of birth: 7 August 1997 (age 29)
- Place of birth: Salto, Uruguay
- Height: 1.87 m (6 ft 2 in)
- Position: Goalkeeper

Team information
- Current team: Club Olimpia
- Number: 21

Youth career
- Liverpool Montevideo

Senior career*
| Years | Team | Apps | (Gls) |
| 2017– | Liverpool Montevideo | 128 | (0) |
- * Club domestic league appearances and goals as of 16 August 2025

Carlos Sebastián Lentinelly Villavicencio (born 7 August 1997) is a Uruguayan professional footballer who plays as a goalkeeper for Paraguayan Primera División Club Olimpia.

== Career ==
Lentinelly is a youth academy graduate of Liverpool Montevideo. He made his professional debut for the club on 22 November 2017 in a 2–1 defeat to Juventud.

== Career statistics ==
As of 16 August 2025

| Club | Season | League | | | Cup (Note: Includes Copa Uruguay) | | Continental | | Other | | Total | |
| Club | Season | Division | Apps | Goals | Apps | Goals | Apps | Goals | Apps | Goals | Apps | Goals |
|---|---|---|---|---|---|---|---|---|---|---|---|---|
| Liverpool Montevideo | 2017 | UPD | 3 | 0 | — | | 0 | 0 | — | | 3 | 0 |
| Liverpool Montevideo | 2018 | UPD | 0 | 0 | — | | — | | — | | 0 | 0 |
| Liverpool Montevideo | 2019 | UPD | 8 | 0 | — | | 0 | 0 | 0 | 0 | 8 | 0 |
| Liverpool Montevideo | 2020 | UPD | 24 | 0 | — | | 0 | 0 | 1 (Note: Appearance in championship playoffs) | 0 | 25 | 0 |
| Liverpool Montevideo | 2021 | UPD | 25 | 0 | — | | 2 (Note: Appearances in Copa Libertadores) | 0 | — | | 27 | 0 |
| Liverpool Montevideo | 2022 | UPD | 11 | 0 | 1 | 0 | 2 (Note: Appearances in Copa Sudamericana) | 0 | 0 | 0 | 14 | 0 |
| Liverpool Montevideo | 2023 | UPD | 7 | 0 | 3 | 0 | 0 | 0 | 1 (Note: Appearance in Supercopa Uruguaya) | 0 | 11 | 0 |
| Liverpool Montevideo | 2024 | UPD | 29 | 0 | 0 | 0 | 3 | 0 | 1 | 0 | 33 | 0 |
| Liverpool Montevideo | 2025 | UPD | 21 | 0 | 0 | 0 | — | | — | | 21 | 0 |
| Career total | | | 128 | 0 | 4 | 0 | 7 | 0 | 3 | 0 | 142 | 0 |

== Honours ==
Liverpool Montevideo

- Uruguayan Primera División: 2023
- Supercopa Uruguaya: 2023, 2024
