= Ezequiel Busquets =

Uruguayan footballer (born 2000)

Personal information
- Full name: Ezequiel Busquets Sanguinetti
- Date of birth: 24 October 2000 (age 26)
- Place of birth: Chuy, Uruguay
- Height: 1.74 m (5 ft 9 in)
- Position: Right-back

Team information
- Current team: Montevideo City Torque
- Number: 15

Youth career
- San Vicente de Chuy
- Peñarol

Senior career*
Years	Team	Apps	(Gls)
2018–2023	Peñarol	41	(1)
2020–2021	→ Marbella (loan)	17	(0)
2023	River Plate	16	(0)
2024	Cerrito	25	(4)
2025–	Montevideo City Torque	23	(3)

International career
2018–2019	Uruguay U20	15	(0)
- * Club domestic league appearances and goals as of 1 October 2025

Ezequiel Busquets Sanguinetti (born 24 October 2000) is a Uruguayan professional footballer who plays as a right-back for Montevideo City Torque.

== Club career ==
Busquets played youth football for San Vicente de Chuy, a club from his hometown in the far east of Uruguay. Peñarol noticed him after a friendly match against his club in 2014. He joined Peñarol's youth section in 2015. He made his professional debut for the club on 7 June 2018 in a 3–1 league win against Defensor Sporting.

On 28 August 2020, Spanish Segunda División B club Marbella announced the signing of Busquets on a season long loan deal with option to buy.

== International career ==
Busquets is a former Uruguayan youth international. He was part of Uruguayan squad at the 2019 South American U-20 Championship and 2019 FIFA U-20 World Cup.

== Career statistics ==
=== Club ===
As of 17 April 2022

Appearances and goals by club, season and competition
Club	Season	League			Cup		Continental		Other		Total	
Club	Season	Division	Apps	Goals	Apps	Goals	Apps	Goals	Apps	Goals	Apps	Goals
Peñarol	2018	Uruguayan Primera División	11	0	—		0	0	1 (Note: Appearance in Championship play-offs.)	0	12	0
Peñarol	2019	Uruguayan Primera División	11	0	—		1 (Note: Appearance in Copa Libertadores.)	0	1	0	13	0
Peñarol	2020	Uruguayan Primera División	0	0	—		0	0	—		0	0
Peñarol	2021	Uruguayan Primera División	2	0	—		0	0	1	0	3	0
Peñarol	2022	Uruguayan Primera División	2	0	—		1	0	0	0	3	0
Peñarol	Total		26	0	0	0	2	0	3	0	31	0
Marbella (loan)	2020–21	Segunda División B	12	0	1	0	—		5 (Note: Appearances in relegation play-offs.)	0	18	0
Career total			38	0	1	0	2	0	8	0	49	0

== Honours ==
Peñarol

- Uruguayan Primera División: 2018, 2021
