= Richard Gonzalez =

Richard Gonzalez may refer to:

- Richard Gonzales (tennis) (1928–1995), American tennis player also known as Pancho Gonzales
- Richard Gonzales (table tennis) (born 1971), Filipino tennis player
- Richard González (footballer) (born 1994), Uruguayan footballer also known as Martín González
