= Julio Fuentes =

Julio Fuentes may refer to:

- Julio M. Fuentes (born 1946), United States Circuit Judge
- Julio Fuentes Serrano (1954–2001), Spanish journalist killed in Afghanistan
- Julio Fuentes (pentathlete) (born 1960), Chilean modern pentathlete
- Julio Fuentes (footballer) (born 1968), Uruguayan football manager and former footballer
- Julio Fuentes, a recurring character on the 1970s American television show Sanford and Son
