= Franco Pérez =

Franco Pérez may refer to:

- Franco Pérez (footballer, born 1996), Argentine forward for Deportivo Madryn
- Franco Pérez (footballer, born 1998), Argentine forward for Aldosivi
- Franco Pérez (footballer, born 2001), Uruguayan football forward
