= Agustín González (footballer, born 1997) =

Uruguayan footballer

Personal information
- Full name: Agustín González Pereira
- Date of birth: 25 January 1997 (age 29)
- Place of birth: Montevideo, Uruguay
- Height: 1.75 m (5 ft 9 in)
- Position: Central midfielder

Team information
- Current team: Liverpool

Youth career
- Nacional

Senior career*
Years	Team	Apps	(Gls)
2017–2020	Nacional	3	(0)
2017	→ Sud América (loan)	23	(2)
2018	→ Torque (loan)	23	(2)
2019	→ Progreso (loan)	25	(6)
2021–2024	Schaffhausen	65	(10)
2024–	Liverpool	17	(0)
2024	→ Brusque (loan)	14	(0)
2025	→ Cienciano (loan)	24	(0)
- * Club domestic league appearances and goals as of 2 January 2026

Agustín González Pereira (born 25 January 1997) is a Uruguayan footballer who plays as a midfielder for Liverpool.

== Club career ==
On 28 July 2021, he signed a two-year contract with Schaffhausen in Switzerland.
