= 2018 Campeonato Uruguayo Primera División =

115th season of the top-tier football league in Uruguay

Liga Profesional de Primera División
- Season: 2018
- Dates: 3 February – 11 November 2018
- Champions: Peñarol (50th title)
- Relegated: Torque; Atenas; El Tanque Sisley (withdrawal)
- Copa Libertadores: Peñarol; Nacional; Danubio; Defensor Sporting
- Copa Sudamericana: Cerro; Liverpool; Montevideo Wanderers; River Plate
- Matches: 261
- Goals: 709 (2.72 per match)
- Top goalscorer: Apertura: David Terans (10 goals); Intermedio: Cristian Palacios (8 goals); Clausura: Gabriel Fernández (9 goals)
- Biggest home win: Peñarol 6–0 River Plate (20 May)
- Biggest away win: Atenas 0–6 Progreso (5 May)
- Highest scoring: Defensor Sporting 5–2 River Plate (1 April); Progreso 4–3 Peñarol (12 May); Liverpool 3–4 Danubio (13 May); Peñarol 3–4 Torque (31 May); Atenas 2–5 Defensor Sporting (22 July); Cerro 5–2 Progreso (25 August); River Plate 3–4 Rampla Juniors (26 August)

The 2018 Liga Profesional de Primera División season, also known as the Campeonato Uruguayo 2018, was the 115th season of Uruguay's top-flight football league, and the 88th in which it is professional. The season was named as "Ing. Julio César Franzini" and began on 3 February, ending on 11 November. Peñarol were the defending champions, and successfully defended the title with a 2–1 win over Nacional in the championship playoff.

== Format ==
The format in this season was the same as the most recent season, with the Torneo Apertura in the first half of the year and the Torneo Clausura in the second half, and a Torneo Intermedio played between both tournaments.

== Teams ==
Locations of the 2018 season teams outside Montevideo.
Locations of the 2018 Primera División teams within Montevideo.

The two bottom-placed teams in the relegation table of the 2017 season, Juventud and Plaza Colonia, as well as Sud América, who lost a tiebreaker to El Tanque Sisley, were relegated to the Segunda División for the 2018 season. They were replaced by Torque, Atenas, and Progreso, who were promoted from the Segunda División.

On 2 February 2018, the Uruguayan Football Association confirmed that El Tanque Sisley would not take part in the league due to an outstanding debt. As a result, El Tanque Sisley were administratively relegated to the second tier for the 2019 season and the season was played by 15 teams.

Club	Manager	City	Stadium	Capacity
Atenas	(Uruguay) Ricardo Ortiz	San Carlos	Atenas	6,000
Boston River	(Uruguay) Alejandro Apud	Montevideo	Parque Artigas^{a}	12,000
Cerro	(Uruguay) Fernando Correa	Montevideo	Luis Tróccoli	24,000
Danubio	(Uruguay) Pablo Peirano	Montevideo	Jardines del Hipódromo	14,401
Defensor Sporting	(Uruguay) Eduardo Acevedo	Montevideo	Luis Franzini	18,000
El Tanque Sisley	Vacant	Montevideo	Campeones Olímpicos^{b}	7,000
Fénix	(Uruguay) Juan Ramón Carrasco	Montevideo	Parque Capurro	5,500
Liverpool	(Uruguay) Paulo Pezzolano	Montevideo	Belvedere	10,000
Montevideo Wanderers	(Uruguay) Eduardo Espinel	Montevideo	Parque Alfredo Víctor Viera	7,420
Nacional	(Uruguay) Alexander Medina	Montevideo	Gran Parque Central	23,500
Peñarol	(Uruguay) Diego López	Montevideo	Campeón del Siglo	40,000
Progreso	(Uruguay) Marcelo Méndez	Montevideo	Parque Abraham Paladino	8,000
Racing	(Uruguay) Juan Tejera	Montevideo	Osvaldo Roberto	4,500
Rampla Juniors	(Uruguay) Julio César Antúnez	Montevideo	Olímpico	9,500
River Plate	(Uruguay) Jorge Giordano	Montevideo	Parque Federico Omar Saroldi	5,624
Torque	(Argentina) Pablo Marini	Montevideo	Casto Martínez Laguarda^{c}	3,800

a: Boston River is based in Montevideo but plays its home games at Estadio Parque Artigas in Las Piedras.
b: El Tanque Sisley is based in Montevideo but plays its home games at Estadio Campeones Olímpicos in Florida.
c: Torque is based in Montevideo but plays its home games at Estadio Municipal Casto Martínez Laguarda in San José de Mayo. They played their first five home games at Estadio José Nasazzi in Montevideo.

=== Managerial changes ===
Team	Outgoing manager	Manner of departure	Date of vacancy	Position in table	Incoming manager	Date of appointment
Torneo Apertura
Torque	(Uruguay) Paulo Pezzolano	Mutual consent	25 November 2017	Pre-season	(Argentina) Pablo Marini	12 December 2017
Danubio	(Uruguay) Roberto Roo	End of caretaker tenure	4 December 2017	Pre-season	(Uruguay) Pablo Peirano	20 December 2017
Liverpool	(Uruguay) Rosario Martínez	Sacked	4 December 2017	Pre-season	(Uruguay) Paulo Pezzolano	18 December 2017
Nacional	(Uruguay) Martín Lasarte	Mutual consent	4 December 2017	Pre-season	(Uruguay) Alexander Medina	11 December 2017
Montevideo Wanderers	(Uruguay) Jorge Giordano	Resigned	6 December 2017	Pre-season	(Uruguay) Eduardo Espinel	17 December 2017
Racing	(Uruguay) Pablo Peirano	Resigned	7 December 2017	Pre-season	(Uruguay) Hernán Rodrigo López	18 December 2017
Cerro	(Argentina) José Basualdo	Mutual consent	6 January 2018	Pre-season	(Uruguay) Fernando Correa	8 January 2018
Atenas	(Uruguay) Adolfo Barán	Resigned	5 May 2018	12th	(Uruguay) Miguel Falero	7 May 2018
Rampla Juniors	(Uruguay) Luis López	Resigned	6 May 2018	15th	(Uruguay) Julio Fuentes	7 May 2018
Torneo Intermedio
Fénix	(Uruguay) Nathaniel Revetria	Mutual consent	15 May 2018	8th, Serie A	(Uruguay) Juan Ramón Carrasco	17 May 2018
Peñarol	(Uruguay) Leonardo Ramos	Signed by Al-Ettifaq	7 June 2018	2nd, Serie B	(Uruguay) Diego López	8 June 2018
Torneo Clausura
Atenas	(Uruguay) Miguel Falero	Resigned	3 July 2018	Pre-tournament	(Uruguay) Ricardo Ortiz	8 July 2018
Racing	(Uruguay) Hernán Rodrigo López	Sacked	13 August 2018	14th	(Uruguay) Juan Tejera	14 August 2018
River Plate	(Uruguay) Pablo Tiscornia	Sacked	27 August 2018	14th	(Uruguay) Jorge Giordano	29 August 2018
Rampla Juniors	(Uruguay) Julio Fuentes	Sacked	10 September 2018	10th	(Uruguay) Julio César Antúnez	11 September 2018

== Torneo Apertura ==
The Torneo Apertura, named "Sr. Abdón Porte", was the first tournament of the 2018 season. It began on 3 February and ended on 6 May. With El Tanque Sisley being unable to take part in the season, all teams were awarded three points in their matches against El Tanque Sisley, with no goals for being counted.

=== Standings ===
Pos	Team	Pld	W	D	L	GF	GA	GD	Pts	Qualification
1	Nacional	15	12	2	1	26	8	+18	38	Qualification to Championship playoff
2	Peñarol	15	11	3	1	28	10	+18	36	
3	Danubio	15	9	3	3	23	13	+10	30	
4	Defensor Sporting	15	9	3	3	26	20	+6	30	
5	Liverpool (Note: Liverpool were awarded two points and Boston River were deducted one point due to a breach of rules by a member of the managerial staff of Boston River during the Torneo Apertura match between both teams.)	15	7	4	4	17	16	+1	27	
6	River Plate	15	7	4	4	28	22	+6	25	
7	Cerro	15	7	4	4	16	18	−2	25	
8	Progreso	15	6	3	6	25	17	+8	21	
9	Fénix	15	6	2	7	18	18	0	20	
10	Boston River	15	5	5	5	17	21	−4	19	
11	Montevideo Wanderers	15	5	3	7	14	20	−6	18	
12	Atenas	15	5	1	9	11	27	−16	16	
13	Racing	15	3	3	9	14	24	−10	12	
14	Torque	15	2	4	9	13	27	−14	10	
15	Rampla Juniors	15	2	4	9	12	27	−15	10	
16	El Tanque Sisley	0	0	0	0	0	0	0	0	Withdrew from league (Note: El Tanque Sisley withdrew from the league due to outstanding debts.)

Source: AUF, Soccerway
Rules for classification: 1) Points, 2) Playoff game, in case two teams are tied for first place.
If there are more than two teams tied in points: 2) Goal difference, 3) Goals for, 4) Head-to-head record, 5) Drawing of lots, 6) Playoff game, in case two teams are still tied for first place.

=== Results ===
Home \ Away	ATE	BOR	CRR	DAN	DFS	ETS	FNX	LIV	WAN	NAC	PEÑ	PRO	RAC	RAJ	RIV	TOR
Atenas	—	—	—	—	—	—	3–1	—	2–1	—	0–2	0–6	1–0	—	—	2–0
Boston River	1–0	—	—	—	—	—	0–3	—	1–3	—	—	3–2	2–1	—	—	1–1
Cerro	1–0	2–3	—	3–2	—	—	—	1–1	—	—	0–3	—	—	2–0	—	1–1
Danubio	5–0	0–0	—	—	2–1	—	—	0–3	—	1–2	—	—	—	3–1	1–0	—
Defensor Sporting	3–0	2–1	2–1	—	—	—	3–2	1–0	—	—	—	1–1	—	—	5–2	2–1
El Tanque Sisley	—	—	—	—	—	—	—	—	—	—	—	—	—	—	—	—
Fénix	—	—	0–0	0–1	—	—	—	—	1–1	—	0–3	2–0	0–1	3–1	—	—
Liverpool	1–0	2–2	—	—	—	—	1–2	—	2–0	—	—	1–1	2–1	—	—	1–0
Montevideo Wanderers	—	—	0–1	0–1	1–2	—	—	—	—	0–2	1–1	—	—	1–1	0–3	—
Nacional	2–1	1–0	4–0	—	2–0	—	2–1	0–0	—	—	—	—	—	—	1–0	—
Peñarol	—	2–1	—	1–1	4–1	—	—	2–1	—	1–1	—	—	—	2–1	4–1	—
Progreso	—	—	0–1	1–1	—	—	—	—	0–1	2–1	0–1	—	3–0	4–1	—	—
Racing	—	—	1–2	1–2	2–2	—	—	—	2–3	0–1	0–2	—	—	2–1	—	—
Rampla Juniors	1–1	0–0	—	—	1–1	—	—	1–2	—	0–3	—	—	—	—	1–2	2–1
River Plate	3–1	2–2	1–1	—	—	—	2–1	5–0	—	—	—	4–2	1–1	—	—	2–2
Torque	—	—	—	0–3	—	—	0–2	—	1–2	2–4	2–0	0–3	2–2	—	—	—

Source: AUF, Soccerway
Legend: Blue = home team win; Yellow = draw; Red = away team win.

=== Top goalscorers ===
Rank	Name	Club	Goals
1	(Uruguay) David Terans	Danubio	10
2	(Argentina) Gonzalo Bergessio	Nacional	9
3	(Argentina) Germán Rivero	Defensor Sporting	7
4	(Uruguay) Leonardo Fernández	Fénix	6
4	(Uruguay) Diego Martiñones	Rampla Juniors	6
4	(Uruguay) Nicolás Rodríguez	River Plate	6
7	(Uruguay) Gastón Colmán	Progreso	5
7	(Uruguay) Maureen Franco	Cerro	5
7	(Uruguay) Federico Martínez	Liverpool	5
7	(Uruguay) Cristian Rodríguez	Peñarol	5

Source: Soccerway

== Torneo Intermedio ==
The Torneo Intermedio, named "Sr. Juan Carlos Bugallo" was the second tournament of the 2018 season, played between the Apertura and Clausura tournaments. It consisted of two groups whose composition depended on the final standings of the Torneo Apertura: teams in odd-numbered positions played in Serie A, and teams in even-numbered positions played in Serie B. Given the absence of El Tanque Sisley for this season, Serie A had the usual eight teams while Serie B was contested by seven teams. It started on 9 May and ended on 10 June, with the winners being granted a berth into the 2019 Copa Sudamericana and the 2019 Supercopa Uruguaya.

=== Serie A ===
Pos	Team	Pld	W	D	L	GF	GA	GD	Pts	Qualification	NAC	CRR	DAN	RAC	WAN	LIV	RAJ	FNX
1	Nacional	7	5	2	0	19	5	+14	17	Advance to Torneo Intermedio Final	—	—	—	5–0	—	1–1	—	3–1
2	Cerro	7	3	4	0	9	5	+4	13		2–2	—	—	0–0	2–1	1–1	—	—
3	Danubio	7	3	1	3	12	12	0	10		0–2	0–2	—	—	0–2	—	4–1	—
4	Racing	7	3	1	3	5	9	−4	10		—	—	0–2	—	—	2–0	1–2	1–0
5	Montevideo Wanderers	7	3	0	4	8	10	−2	9		1–4	—	—	0–1	—	1–0	—	0–1
6	Liverpool	7	2	2	3	10	11	−1	8		—	—	3–4	—	—	—	2–1	3–1
7	Rampla Juniors	7	2	0	5	9	14	−5	6		0–2	0–1	—	—	2–3	—	—	—
8	Fénix	7	1	2	4	7	13	−6	5		—	1–1	2–2	—	—	—	1–3	—

Source: AUF, Soccerway
Legend: Blue = home team win; Yellow = draw; Red = away team win.
Rules for classification: 1) Points, 2) Goal difference, 3) Goals for, 4) Head-to-head record, 5) Drawing of lots, 6) Playoff game, in case two teams are tied for first place.

=== Serie B ===
Pos	Team	Pld	W	D	L	GF	GA	GD	Pts	Qualification	TOR	PEÑ	RIV	ATE	PRO	DFS	BOR
1	Torque	6	4	1	1	10	6	+4	13	Advance to Torneo Intermedio Final	—	—	2–2	—	—	1–0	0–1
2	Peñarol	6	4	0	2	20	10	+10	12		3–4	—	6–0	—	—	—	3–0
3	River Plate	6	2	3	1	5	9	−4	9		—	—	—	—	—	1–0	1–0
4	Atenas	6	2	2	2	6	5	+1	8		0–1	1–2	1–1	—	—	—	1–0
5	Progreso	6	1	3	2	5	7	−2	6		0–2	4–3	0–0	1–1	—	—	—
6	Defensor Sporting	6	2	0	4	4	8	−4	6		—	1–3	—	0–2	1–0	—	—
7	Boston River	6	1	1	4	2	7	−5	4		—	—	—	—	0–0	1–2	—

Source: AUF, Soccerway
Legend: Blue = home team win; Yellow = draw; Red = away team win.
Rules for classification: 1) Points, 2) Goal difference, 3) Goals for, 4) Head-to-head record, 5) Drawing of lots, 6) Playoff game, in case two teams are still tied for first place.

=== Torneo Intermedio Final ===
10 June 2018
15:00

Nacional	3–2	Torque
Aguiar 66', 71'; Bergessio 90'	Report	Pereira 21', 38'

Estadio Centenario, Montevideo
Referee: Esteban Ostojich

=== Top goalscorers ===
Rank	Name	Club	Goals
1	(Uruguay) Cristian Palacios	Peñarol	8
2	(Argentina) Gonzalo Bergessio	Nacional	6
3	(Uruguay) Luis Aguiar	Nacional	4
3	(Uruguay) Nicolás González	Cerro	4
3	(Uruguay) Diego Guastavino	Liverpool	4
3	(Uruguay) Darío Pereira	Torque	4
3	(Uruguay) David Terans	Danubio	4
8	(Uruguay) Facundo Boné	River Plate	3
8	(Uruguay) Álvaro Brun	Torque	3
8	(Uruguay) Ignacio González	Montevideo Wanderers	3
8	(Uruguay) Juan Ignacio Ramírez	Liverpool	3
8	(Uruguay) Tabaré Viudez	Nacional	3

Source: Soccerway

== Torneo Clausura ==
The Torneo Clausura, named "Cr. Hugo Sebastiani", was the third tournament of the 2018 season. It began on 21 July and ended on 4 November. As happened in the Torneo Apertura, all teams were awarded three points in their matches against El Tanque Sisley, with no goals for being counted.

=== Standings ===
Pos	Team	Pld	W	D	L	GF	GA	GD	Pts	Qualification
1	Peñarol	15	11	3	1	25	10	+15	36	Qualification to Championship playoff
2	Nacional	15	9	3	3	19	14	+5	30	
3	Montevideo Wanderers	15	8	4	3	26	20	+6	28	
4	Racing	15	7	4	4	17	13	+4	25	
5	Liverpool	15	6	5	4	22	17	+5	23	
6	Defensor Sporting	15	6	4	5	23	19	+4	22	
7	Progreso	15	6	4	5	21	19	+2	22	
8	Rampla Juniors	15	5	6	4	16	16	0	21	
9	Cerro	15	5	6	4	22	23	−1	21	
10	Danubio	15	4	8	3	13	15	−2	20	
11	Torque	15	4	6	5	16	18	−2	18	
12	Fénix	15	5	3	7	16	19	−3	18	
13	River Plate	15	4	3	8	20	33	−13	15	
14	Boston River	15	4	2	9	14	22	−8	14	
15	Atenas	15	2	7	6	12	24	−12	13	
16	El Tanque Sisley	0	0	0	0	0	0	0	0	Withdrew from league (Note: El Tanque Sisley withdrew from the league due to outstanding debts.)

Source: AUF, Soccerway
Rules for classification: 1) Points, 2) Playoff game, in case two teams are tied for first place.
If there are more than two teams tied in points: 2) Goal difference, 3) Goals for, 4) Head-to-head record, 5) Drawing of lots, 6) Playoff game, in case two teams are still tied for first place.

=== Results ===
Home \ Away	ATE	BOR	CRR	DAN	DFS	ETS	FNX	LIV	WAN	NAC	PEÑ	PRO	RAC	RAJ	RIV	TOR
Atenas	—	1–0	0–1	0–0	2–5	—	—	0–1	—	2–2	—	—	—	2–2	1–1	—
Boston River	—	—	2–3	0–0	3–1	—	—	1–0	—	1–0	1–2	—	—	0–0	2–3	—
Cerro	—	—	—	—	1–1	—	0–5	—	1–1	1–2	—	5–2	1–2	—	4–2	—
Danubio	—	—	0–0	—	—	—	1–1	—	2–2	—	0–2	2–2	1–1	—	—	3–1
Defensor Sporting	—	—	—	1–2	—	—	—	—	3–0	2–0	1–2	—	2–1	2–2	—	—
El Tanque Sisley	—	—	—	—	—	—	—	—	—	—	—	—	—	—	—	—
Fénix	2–1	2–1	—	—	1–2	—	—	0–0	—	0–3	—	—	—	—	1–3	2–1
Liverpool	—	—	1–1	3–0	2–1	—	—	—	—	1–2	2–4	—	—	2–0	4–1	—
Montevideo Wanderers	2–2	3–1	—	—	—	—	1–1	3–2	—	—	—	3–2	1–2	—	—	1–0
Nacional	—	—	—	1–0	—	—	—	—	1–3	—	1–1	1–0	1–0	2–1	—	3–2
Peñarol	2–0	—	3–2	—	—	—	2–0	—	3–0	—	—	1–0	1–1	—	—	1–1
Progreso	5–0	1–0	—	—	0–0	—	1–0	1–1	—	—	—	—	—	—	2–2	3–1
Racing	0–0	3–0	—	—	—	—	2–1	1–1	—	—	—	2–0	—	—	2–1	0–1
Rampla Juniors	—	—	2–2	0–0	—	—	1–0	—	0–1	—	1–0	1–2	2–0	—	—	—
River Plate	—	—	—	1–2	3–2	—	—	—	0–5	0–0	0–1	—	—	3–4	—	—
Torque	1–1	3–2	0–0	—	0–0	—	—	2–2	—	—	—	—	—	0–0	3–0	—

Source: AUF, Soccerway
Legend: Blue = home team win; Yellow = draw; Red = away team win.

=== Top goalscorers ===
Rank	Name	Club	Goals
1	(Uruguay) Gabriel Fernández	Peñarol	9
2	(Uruguay) Álvaro Navarro	Defensor Sporting	8
2	(Uruguay) Federico Martínez	Liverpool	8
4	(Uruguay) Luis Acevedo	Cerro	6
4	(Uruguay) Nicolás Albarracín	Montevideo Wanderers	6
4	(Uruguay) Luis Manuel Castro	Montevideo Wanderers	6
4	(Uruguay) Diego Coelho	Boston River	6
4	(Uruguay) Sebastián Fernández	Nacional	6
4	(Uruguay) Ignacio Lemmo	Progreso	6
4	(Uruguay) Rodrigo Pastorini	Montevideo Wanderers	6

Source: Soccerway

== Aggregate table ==
The aggregate table includes the results of the three stages played throughout the season (Torneo Apertura, Torneo Intermedio, and Torneo Clausura). Since El Tanque Sisley did not compete (which caused the Torneo Intermedio to have groups of different size), the points earned by the teams in the smaller group of the Torneo Intermedio were weighted for the purposes of elaborating the aggregate table: teams in Serie B had their points divided between the number of games they played (6) and then multiplied by the number of games played by teams in Serie A (7), in order to get the points earned in the Torneo Intermedio to the effects of the aggregate table.

Pos	Team	Pld	W	D	L	GF	GA	GD	Pts	Qualification
1	Peñarol (Note: Torneo Intermedio points after weighting: Torque: 15.166, Peñarol: 14, River Plate: 10.5, Atenas: 9.333, Progreso: 7, Defensor Sporting: 7, Boston River: 4.666) (C)	36	26	6	4	73	30	+43	86	Qualification to Championship playoff and Copa Libertadores group stage
2	Nacional	37	26	7	4	64	27	+37	85	Qualification to Championship playoff and Copa Libertadores group stage
3	Danubio	37	16	12	9	48	40	+8	60	Qualification to Copa Libertadores second stage
4	Defensor Sporting	36	17	7	12	53	47	+6	59	Qualification to Copa Libertadores first stage
5	Cerro	37	15	14	8	47	46	+1	59	Qualification to Copa Sudamericana first stage (Note: Since the Torneo Intermedio winners (Nacional) qualified for the Copa Libertadores, the spot awarded to the Torneo Intermedio winners (Copa Sudamericana first stage) was passed down to the next best-placed team, in this case to the sixth-placed team.)
6	Liverpool (Note: Liverpool were awarded two points and Boston River were deducted one point due to a breach of rules by a member of the managerial staff of Boston River during the Torneo Apertura match between both teams.)	37	15	11	11	49	44	+5	58	Qualification to Copa Sudamericana first stage
7	Montevideo Wanderers	37	16	7	14	48	50	−2	55	Qualification to Copa Sudamericana first stage
8	River Plate	36	13	10	13	53	64	−11	50.5	Qualification to Copa Sudamericana first stage
9	Progreso	36	13	10	13	51	43	+8	50	
10	Racing	37	13	8	16	36	46	−10	47	
11	Torque	36	10	11	15	39	51	−12	43.166	
12	Fénix	37	12	7	18	41	50	−9	43	
13	Atenas	36	9	10	17	29	56	−27	38.333	
14	Boston River	36	10	8	18	33	50	−17	37.666	
15	Rampla Juniors	37	9	10	18	37	57	−20	37	
16	El Tanque Sisley	0	0	0	0	0	0	0	0	Withdrew from league (Note: El Tanque Sisley withdrew from the league due to outstanding debts.)

Source: AUF
Rules for classification: 1) Points, 2) Playoff game, in case two teams are tied for first place.
If there are more than two teams tied in points: 2) Goal difference, 3) Goals for, 4) Head-to-head record, 5) Drawing of lots, 6) Playoff game, in case two teams are still tied for first place.
(C) Champions

== Championship playoff ==
Semi-final		Finals
		Peñarol (Semifinal winners)	—	—	—
Nacional (Apertura winners)	1	Peñarol (Aggregate table first place)	—	—	—
Peñarol (Clausura winners) (a.e.t.)	2

=== Semi-final ===
11 November 2018
16:30

Nacional	1–2 (a.e.t.)	Peñarol
Zunino 47'	Report	Formiliano 71'; Cr. Rodríguez 95' (pen.)

Estadio Centenario, Montevideo
Referee: Daniel Fedorczuk

Nacional	Peñarol

NACIONAL:
GK	1	(Uruguay) Esteban Conde
RB	2	(Argentina) Marcos Angeleri
CB	5	(Uruguay) Rafael García	(yellow card) 87'
CB	6	(Uruguay) Alexis Rolín	(substituted off) 81'
LB	22	(Uruguay) Alfonso Espino	(yellow card) 93'
RM	13	(Uruguay) Matías Zunino	(yellow card) 56'	(substituted off) 94'
CM	19	(Uruguay) Santiago Romero
CM	17	(Uruguay) Christian Oliva	(yellow card) 17'	(substituted off) 69'
LM	14	(Uruguay) Gonzalo Castro
FW	24	(Argentina) Gonzalo Bergessio	(yellow card) 97'
FW	18	(Uruguay) Sebastián Fernández	(yellow card) 45'
Substitutes:
GK	12	(Panama) Luis Mejía
DF	3	(Argentina) Rodrigo Erramuspe	(substituted on) 81'
MF	7	(Uruguay) Luis Aguiar	(substituted on) 69'
MF	10	(Uruguay) Tabaré Viudez	(substituted on) 94'
FW	20	(Uruguay) Carlos De Pena
FW	11	(Uruguay) Leandro Barcia
FW	23	(Cameroon) Pierre Webó
Manager:
(Uruguay) Alexander Medina

PEÑAROL:
GK	12	(Uruguay) Kevin Dawson
RB	15	(Uruguay) Ezequiel Busquets	(yellow card) 102'
CB	2	(Uruguay) Fabricio Formiliano
CB	4	(Uruguay) Carlos Rodríguez
LB	27	(Uruguay) Lucas Hernández
RM	20	(Uruguay) Giovanni González	(substituted off) 55'
CM	23	(Uruguay) Walter Gargano
CM	7	(Uruguay) Cristian Rodríguez
LM	19	(Uruguay) Agustín Canobbio	(substituted off) 66'
FW	28	(Argentina) Lucas Viatri
FW	26	(Uruguay) Gabriel Fernández	(substituted off) 114'
Substitutes:
GK	1	(Uruguay) Thiago Cardozo
DF	25	(Argentina) Carlos Matheu
MF	5	(Uruguay) Marcel Novick
MF	11	(Uruguay) Fabián Estoyanoff	(substituted on) 66'	(yellow card) 110'
MF	17	(Uruguay) Ignacio Lores
MF	10	(Argentina) Maximiliano Rodríguez	(substituted on) 55'
FW	24	(Uruguay) Darwin Núñez	(substituted on) 114'
Manager:
(Uruguay) Diego López

=== Final ===
Since Peñarol, who had the best record in the aggregate table, won the semifinal, they became champions automatically and the final was not played. Nacional became runners-up as the second-placed team in the aggregate table. Both teams qualified for the 2019 Copa Libertadores group stage.

Primera División
2018 Champions
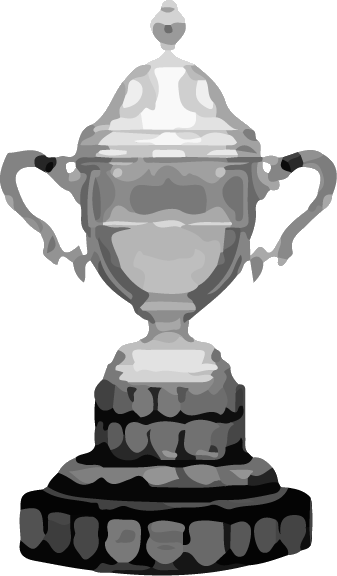

50th title

== Relegation ==
Relegation was determined at the end of the season by computing an average of the number of points earned per game over the two most recent seasons: 2017 and 2018. El Tanque Sisley was one of the teams relegated to the Segunda División for the following season, as well as the two teams with the lowest average.

Pos	Team	2017 Pts	2018 Pts	Total Pts	Total Pld	Avg	Relegation
1	Peñarol	86	84	170	73	2.329	
2	Nacional	83	85	168	74	2.27	
3	Defensor Sporting	86	58	144	73	1.973	
4	Cerro	53	59	112	74	1.514	
5	Montevideo Wanderers	55	55	110	74	1.486	
6	Danubio	46	60	106	74	1.432	
7	Progreso	—	49	49	36	1.361	
8	River Plate	45	49	94	73	1.288	
9	Liverpool	37	58	95	74	1.284	
10	Racing	45	47	92	74	1.243	
11	Boston River	52	37	89	73	1.219	
12	Rampla Juniors	50	37	87	74	1.176	
13	Fénix	42	43	85	74	1.149	
14	Torque (R)	—	41	41	36	1.139	Relegation to Segunda División
15	Atenas (R)	—	37	37	36	1.028	Relegation to Segunda División
16	El Tanque Sisley (R)	37	—	37	37	1	Relegation to Segunda División
