= Álvaro Brun =

Uruguayan footballer (born 1987)

Personal information
- Full name: Álvaro Nicolás Brun Martínez
- Date of birth: 10 April 1987 (age 39)
- Place of birth: Montevideo, Uruguay
- Height: 1.86 m (6 ft 1 in)
- Position: Midfielder

Team information
- Current team: Montevideo City Torque

Youth career
- Wanderers
- Fénix

Senior career*
Years	Team	Apps	(Gls)
2009-2011	Fénix	16	(1)
2011-2012	San Martín de Tucumán	21	(0)
2012	Cerro Largo	6	(0)
2013	Central Español	12	(1)
2013-2014	Gimnasia y Esgrima de Jujuy	34	(0)
2015	Cerro	14	(0)
2015	Real Estelí	15	(1)
2016	Oriental	7	(1)
2016	Central Español	12	(1)
2017-	Montevideo City Torque	106	(16)
2022	→ Universidad de Chile (loan)	9	(1)
- * Club domestic league appearances and goals

Álvaro Nicolás Brun Martínez (born 10 April 1987) is a Uruguayan footballer who plays as a midfielder for Montevideo City Torque.

== Career ==
Brun started his career with Uruguayan top flight side Fénix, before joining San Martín de Tucumán in the Argentine third division.

In 2013, Brun signed for Argentine club Gimnasia y Esgrima de Jujuy, where he made 34 league appearances and scored 0 goals.

In 2015, he signed for Real Estelí in Nicaragua after playing for Uruguayan top flight team Cerro.

Before the second half of 2015/16, Brun signed for Oriental in the Uruguayan second division.
