= Luka Andrade =

Argentine footballer (born 2007)

Personal information
- Date of birth: 3 January 2007 (age 19)
- Place of birth: Puerto Madryn, Chubut, Argentina
- Position: Forward

Team information
- Current team: Montevideo City Torque
- Number: 7

Youth career
- Escuelita de Catri
- Euskadi
- JJ Moreno
- River Plate
- 2022–2024: Boca Juniors
- Montevideo City Torque

Senior career*
Years	Team	Apps	(Gls)
2025–	Montevideo City Torque	17	(0)

International career
2022–	Argentina U17		
- * Club domestic league appearances and goals as of 1 October 2025

Luka Braian Andrade (born 3 January 2007) is an Argentine footballer currently playing as a forward for Montevideo City Torque.

== Club career ==
Born in Puerto Madryn in the Chubut Province of Argentina, Andrade began his career with Escuelita de Catri, before joining amateur side Euskadi at the age of five. He spent time with Club Social y Deportivo Juan José Moreno, before joining the academy of professional side River Plate, having trialled with them in 2018. He moved to Buenos Aires rivals Boca Juniors in 2022. In his second year with the club, he won the national tournament for his age-group, finishing as top scorer with nineteen goals.

== International career ==
In May 2022, Andrade was first called up to the Argentina under-17 side ahead of a friendly match against Chile. After suffering an injury which kept him out for four months, he was left out of the squad for the 2023 South American U-17 Championship.

== Style of play ==
A forward, capable of playing in either of the front three positions, Andrade has been compared to former Argentine international Ariel Ortega for his dribbling ability.
