= Rolando Carlen =

Argentine football manager

Personal information
- Full name: Rolando Adrián Carlen
- Date of birth: 11 November 1966 (age 59)
- Place of birth: Santa Fe, Argentina
- Position: Forward

Youth career
- Unión de Santa Fe

Senior career*
Years	Team	Apps	(Gls)
1986–1988	Unión de Santa Fe		
1989–1990	Guaraní Antonio Franco		
1991	America United		
1992–1993	Toronto International		
1993–1996	Argentino de Quilmes		

Managerial career
- 1997–1998: Ateneo Inmaculada
- 1999–2001: Atlético Pilar
- 2005: Colón (assistant)
- 2006–2008: Gimnasia Santa Fe
- 2008–2011: Colón (youth)
- 2011: Colón (assistant)
- 2012–2013: San Lorenzo (assistant)
- 2013–2014: Valencia (assistant)
- 2014–2016: León (assistant)
- 2016–2017: Chile (assistant)
- 2017–2019: Saudi Arabia (assistant)
- 2019: San Lorenzo (assistant)
- 2021: Cerro
- 2022: Boca Unidos
- 2023: Ben Hur
- 2024: GV San José
- 2025: Guabirá
- * Club domestic league appearances and goals

Rolando Adrián Carlen (born 11 November 1966) is an Argentine football manager and former player who played as a forward.

== Playing career ==
Carlen was born in Santa Fe, and made his senior debut with hometown side Unión de Santa Fe. After playing for Guaraní Antonio Franco, he moved to Canada in 1991, and joined America United.

Carlen subsequently represented Toronto International also in Canada before moving back to his home country in 1993 with Argentino de Quilmes. He retired in 1996 with the latter club, aged 30.

== Managerial career ==
Carlen started his managerial career with Ateneo Inmaculada in 1997. He was subsequently in charge of Atlético Pilar from 1999 until 2001, and later became Juan Antonio Pizzi's assistant at Colón in 2005.

Carlen returned to managerial duties in February 2006, after being appointed in charge of Gimnasia y Esgrima de Santa Fe. He resigned in February 2008, and subsequently returned to Colón as a manager of the youth setup.

In 2011, Carlen was Mario Sciacqua's assistant at Colón. He moved to San Lorenzo in 2012 to work in Pizzi's staff, and remained with the manager in the following years, at Valencia, León, the Chile national team and the Saudi Arabia national team. Both returned to San Lorenzo in 2019.

On 12 January 2021, Carlen was presented as manager of Uruguayan club Cerro. He subsequently managed Boca Unidos and Ben Hur in his home country, before taking over Bolivian Primera División side GV San José on 21 March 2024.

Carlen resigned from San José on 12 August 2024, and took over fellow league team Guabirá on 26 December. On 26 May 2025, he resigned from the latter.
