= Nicolás Sosa =

Uruguayan footballer (born 1996)

Personal information
- Full name: Nicolás Sosa Sánchez
- Date of birth: 6 April 1996 (age 30)
- Place of birth: Melo, Uruguay
- Height: 1.77 m (5 ft 10 in)
- Position: Forward

Team information
- Current team: Racing Montevideo
- Number: 23

Senior career*
| Years | Team | Apps | (Gls) |
| 2014–2016 | Cerro Largo | 1 | (0) |
| 2016–2019 | Racing Montevideo | 86 | (25) |
| 2018 | → Cerro Largo (loan) | 13 | (4) |
| 2020–2023 | León | 22 | (0) |
| 2021 | → Querétaro (loan) | 16 | (1) |
| 2022 | → River Plate (loan) | 27 | (4) |
| 2023 | → Banfield (loan) | 33 | (1) |
| 2024– | Racing Montevideo | 7 | (2) |
- * Club domestic league appearances and goals as of 9 April 2024

Nicolás Sosa Sánchez (born 6 April 1996), also known as "NicKiller," is a Uruguayan professional footballer who plays as a forward for Uruguayan Primera División club Racing de Montevideo.

"NicKiller" represented his team, León, in the first edition of the eLiga MX, an eSports tournament with the FIFA 20 game. In the Final, he beat Santiago Cáseres who represented América, making León the first Champion of the Tournament.

== Honours ==
León

- eLiga MX: 2020
- Liga MX: Guardianes 2020
