= Franco Pérez (footballer, born 2001) =

Uruguayan footballer

Personal information
- Full name: Franco Marcelo Pérez Portillo
- Date of birth: 1 August 2001 (age 25)
- Place of birth: Joaquín Suárez, Uruguay
- Height: 1.68 m (5 ft 6 in)
- Position: Winger

Team information
- Current team: Boston River
- Number: 46

Senior career*
Years	Team	Apps	(Gls)
2020–2023	Rentistas	83	(6)
2023	→ Orlando City B (loan)	18	(0)
2024–	Boston River	25	(0)
- * Club domestic league appearances and goals as of 1 December 2024

Franco Marcelo Pérez Portillo (born 1 August 2001) is a Uruguayan footballer who plays as a forward for Uruguayan Primera División club Boston River.

== Career ==
Pérez is a youth academy graduate of Rentistas. He made his professional debut for the club on 7 March 2020, coming on as a 71st minute substitute for Gonzalo Vega in a 4–1 league victory over Deportivo Maldonado. He made an instant impact in the match by scoring his team's second goal six minutes later.

In March 2023, Pérez was announced to have joined MLS Next Pro club Orlando City B on loan for the 2023 season with the option to buy.

Pérez is a current Uruguayan youth international.

== Career statistics ==
=== Club ===
As of 22 October 2022

Club	Season	League			Cup		Continental		Other		Total	
Club	Season	Division	Apps	Goals	Apps	Goals	Apps	Goals	Apps	Goals	Apps	Goals
Rentistas	2020	Uruguayan Primera División	29	4	—		—		4 (Note: Three appearances and one goal in Primera División playoffs, one appearance in Torneo Apertura decider.)	1	33	5
Rentistas	2021	Uruguayan Primera División	27	1	–		6 (Note: Appearances in Copa Libertadores.)	0	—		33	1
Rentistas	2022	Uruguayan Primera División	27	0	—		—		—		27	0
Career total			83	5	0	0	6	0	4	1	93	6
