= Álvaro Gutiérrez (footballer) =

Uruguayan footballer (born 1968)

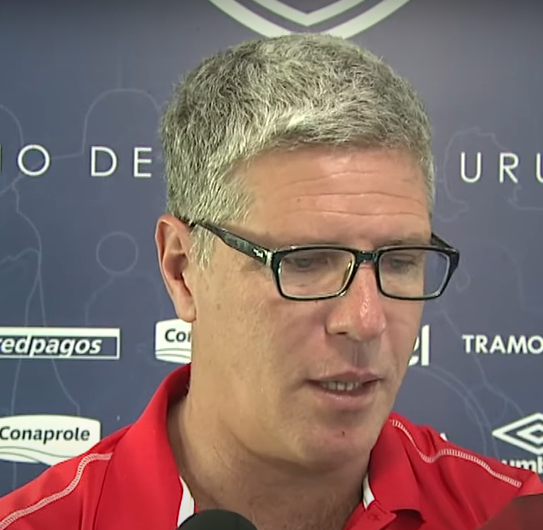
- Gutiérrez in 2015

Personal information
- Full name: Álvaro Gutiérrez Pelscher
- Date of birth: 21 July 1968 (age 58)
- Place of birth: Montevideo, Uruguay
- Height: 1.89 m (6 ft 2 in)
- Position: Midfielder

Senior career*
| Years | Team | Apps | (Gls) |
| 1988–1991 | Bella Vista | | |
| 1992–1995 | Nacional | | |
| 1995–1998 | Valladolid | 78 | (1) |
| 1998–1999 | Rayo Vallecano | 9 | (0) |
| 1999 | Bella Vista | | |
| 2000 | Liverpool Montevideo | | |
| 2000–2001 | Sporting Gijón | 10 | (0) |

International career
| 1991–1997 | Uruguay | 38 | (1) |

Managerial career
- 2005: Atenas
- 2006: Rampla Juniors
- 2006–2007: Rentistas
- 2008–2014: Nacional (youth)
- 2014–2015: Nacional
- 2015–2016: Al Shabab
- 2016: LDU Quito
- 2019: Nacional
- 2021: Olimpia
- 2022: Universitario
- 2023: Nacional
Medal record
Representing Uruguay
Copa América
| Winner | 1995 Uruguay |
- * Club domestic league appearances and goals

Álvaro Gutiérrez Pelscher (born 21 July 1968) is a Uruguayan football manager and former player who played as a midfielder.

Gutiérrez played 38 times for the Uruguay national team between 1991 and 1997, being a part of the Uruguay team that won the Copa América in 1995. He started his playing career in 1988 with Bella Vista. In 1990, he was part of the team that won their first and only league title. In 1992, he joined Nacional where he was part of the championship winning team in 1992.

After being part of the Copa América winning team in 1995 he was signed by Spanish team Real Valladolid where he played until 1998. He then had a short spell with Rayo Vallecano before returning to Bella Vista in 1999.

Gutiérrez played for Liverpool de Montevideo in 2000 and then returned to Spain Sporting de Gijón which was his last club.

== Honours ==
=== Player ===
Bella Vista

- Uruguayan Primera División: 1990

Nacional

- Uruguayan Primera División: 1992

Uruguay

- Copa América: 1995

=== Manager ===
Nacional

- Uruguayan Primera División: 2014–15, 2019
