= David Terans =

Uruguayan footballer (born 1994)

Personal information
- Full name: Miguel David Terans Pérez
- Date of birth: 11 August 1994 (age 32)
- Place of birth: Montevideo, Uruguay
- Height: 1.70 m (5 ft 7 in)
- Positions: Forward; attacking midfielder

Team information
- Current team: Atlético Goianiense (on loan from Fluminense)

Youth career
- 2010–2012: Rentistas

Senior career*
Years	Team	Apps	(Gls)
2013–2018	Rentistas	80	(14)
2016–2017	→ Santiago Wanderers (loan)	25	(6)
2017–2018	→ Danubio (loan)	34	(22)
2018–2021	Atlético Mineiro	31	(2)
2020–2021	→ Peñarol (loan)	29	(15)
2021–2023	Athletico Paranaense	87	(24)
2023–2024	Pachuca	11	(0)
2024–	Fluminense	13	(0)
2025	→ Peñarol (loan)	23	(4)
2026–	→ Atlético Goianiense (loan)	0	(0)

International career
2021	Uruguay	2	(0)
- * Club domestic league appearances and goals as of 1 January 2026

Miguel David Terans Pérez (born 11 August 1994), known as David Terans, is a Uruguayan professional footballer who plays for Atlético Goianiense, on loan from Fluminense. Mainly a forward, he can also play as an attacking midfielder.

== Club career ==
=== Rentistas ===
Born in Montevideo, Terans joined Rentistas' youth ranks in 2010. He was promoted to the main squad in 2013 and promptly secured a spot in the starting team, making 21 appearances and scoring seven goals during his first season in the Uruguayan Primera División.

==== Santiago Wanderers (loan) ====
In July 2016, he was sent on loan to Chilean club Santiago Wanderers, where he made 25 appearances and scored six goals in the 2016–17 Chilean Primera División season.

==== Danubio (loan) ====
On 26 July 2017, Terans joined Danubio on a year-long loan. He scored eight goals in 14 matches in the 2017 Torneo Clausura, helping Danubio secure the last Uruguayan berth in the 2018 Copa Sudamericana. In 2018, he finished as top goalscorer in the Torneo Apertura with 10 goals and scored four times in the Torneo Intermedio.

=== Atlético Mineiro ===
On 15 June 2018, Terans joined Brazilian club Atlético Mineiro on a five-year deal.

==== Peñarol (loan) ====
On 14 January 2020, Terans joined Peñarol on a season-long loan, which was eventually extended for an additional year.

=== Athletico Paranaense ===
On 22 May 2021, Terans signed a four-year deal with Athletico Paranaense.

== International career ==
In August 2021, Terans received his first call-up to the Uruguay national team for 2022 FIFA World Cup qualification matches against Peru, Bolivia and Ecuador. He made his debut on 2 September 2021 in a 1–1 draw against Peru. On 21 October 2022, he was named in Uruguay's 55-man preliminary squad for the 2022 FIFA World Cup. However, he was not included in the final squad, which was announced three weeks later.

== Career statistics ==
=== Club ===
As of 28 February 2023

Club	Season	League			Cup		Continental		State League		Other		Total	
Club	Season	Division	Apps	Goals	Apps	Goals	Apps	Goals	Apps	Goals	Apps	Goals	Apps	Goals
Rentistas	2013–14	Uruguayan Primera División	22	7	—		—		—		—		22	7
Rentistas	2014–15	Uruguayan Primera División	28	4	—		2 (Note: Appearances in Copa Sudamericana)	0	—		—		30	4
Rentistas	2015–16	Uruguayan Primera División	30	3	—		—		—		—		30	3
Rentistas	Total		80	14	—		2	0	—		—		82	14
Santiago Wanderers	2016–17	Chilean Primera División	25	6	2	0	—		—		—		27	6
Danubio	2017	Uruguayan Primera División	14	8	—		—		—		—		14	8
Danubio	2018	Uruguayan Primera División	20	14	—		2	0	—		—		22	14
Danubio	Total		34	22	—		2	0	—		—		36	22
Atlético Mineiro	2018	Série A	19	1	—		—		—		—		19	1
Atlético Mineiro	2019	Série A	4	0	0	0	2 (Note: One appearance in Copa Libertadores, one appearance in Copa Sudamericana)	0	8 (Note: Appearances in Campeonato Mineiro)	1	—		14	1
Atlético Mineiro	Total		23	1	0	0	2	0	8	1	—		33	2
Peñarol	2020	Uruguayan Primera División	29	15	—		8 (Note: Six appearances in Copa Libertadores, two appearances in Copa Sudamericana)	0	—		—		37	15
Peñarol	2021	Uruguayan Primera División	0	0	—		6	3	—		—		6	3
Peñarol	Total		29	15	—		14	3	—		—		43	18
Athletico Paranaense	2021	Série A	29	6	9	2	7	1	—		—		45	9
Athletico Paranaense	2022	Série A	31	12	4	0	12 (Note: Appearances in Copa Libertadores)	2	4 (Note: Appearances in Campeonato Paranaense)	2	2 (Note: Appearances in Recopa Sudamericana)	1	53	17
Athletico Paranaense	2023	Série A	9	0	3	0	5	1	14	4	—		31	5
Athletico Paranaense	Total		69	18	16	2	24	4	18	6	2	1	129	31
Career total			260	76	20	2	44	7	26	7	2	1	349	93

=== International ===
As of match played 5 September 2021

Appearances and goals by national team and year
National team	Year	Apps	Goals
Uruguay	2021	2	0
Total		2	0

== Honours ==
Athletico Paranaense

- Copa Sudamericana: 2021
- Campeonato Paranaense: 2023

Fluminense

- Recopa Sudamericana: 2024
