= Gastón de los Santos =

Uruguayan footballer (born 1982)

Personal information
- Full name: Gastón Fernando de los Santos
- Date of birth: April 19, 1982 (age 44)
- Place of birth: Montevideo, Uruguay
- Height: 1.83 m (6 ft 0 in)
- Position: Defender

Youth career
- Rampla Juniors

Senior career*
Years	Team	Apps	(Gls)
2001–2007	Rampla Juniors	86	(3)
2008	Bella Vista	17	(0)
2009	Blooming	10	(0)
2009–2010	Juventud de Las Piedras	15	(1)
2010–2011	Rampla Juniors	7	(0)
2011–2012	Cerrito	19	(0)
2012–2013	Estudiantes de Mérida	5	(0)
2013–2014	Rampla Juniors	4	(0)
2014	C.A. Progreso	5	(0)
- * Club domestic league appearances and goals as of June 30, 2014

Gastón Fernando de los Santos (born April 19, 1982, in Montevideo) is a Uruguayan football defender who last played for Club Atlético Progreso in the Uruguayan Segunda División.

In 2001, he began his career playing for modest club Rampla Juniors. After six years with the rojiverdes, he transferred to C.A. Bella Vista, where he played for one season. In 2009 manager Pablo Repetto brought him to join Bolivian team Blooming, Later in the year, he signed for Uruguayan club Juventud de Las Piedras. In 2010, he returned to Rampla Juniors that is the first club in his career after three years since he left the club.
