= Matías Rosa =

Uruguayan footballer and manager (born 1982)

Personal information
- Full name: Víctor Matías Rosa Castro
- Date of birth: 10 January 1982 (age 44)
- Place of birth: Tacuarembó, Uruguay
- Height: 1.83 m (6 ft 0 in)
- Position: Midfielder

Youth career
- Tacuarembó

Senior career*
Years	Team	Apps	(Gls)
2000–2003	Tacuarembó		
2004–2006	Liverpool Montevideo		
2007	Durazno		
2008	Tacuarembó		
2008–2009	Sacachispas		
2010–2011	Deportivo Malacateco		

Managerial career
- 2013–2014: Miramar Misiones (youth)
- 2015: Montevideo Wanderers (youth)
- 2016: Cerro (assistant)
- 2016: Canadian
- 2017: Huracán Buceo
- 2017–2019: Plaza Colonia (youth)
- 2019–2021: Plaza Colonia
- 2021: Tacuarembó
- 2022: Búhos ULVR
- 2023: Cantolao
- 2023: Tacuarembó
- 2024: Albion
- * Club domestic league appearances and goals

Víctor Matías Rosa Castro (born 10 January 1982) is a Uruguayan football manager and former player who played as a midfielder.

== Playing career ==
Born in Tacuarembó, Rosa made his senior debut with hometown side Tacuarembó FC in 2000. In 2004, he moved to Liverpool Montevideo, playing for three seasons with the side.

After spending the 2007 season at Durazno, Rosa subsequently returned to Tacuarembó. He then moved abroad with Sacachispas and Deportivo Malacateco in Guatemala, and retired with the latter in 2011, aged just 29.

== Managerial career ==
After working in the youth sides of Miramar Misiones and Montevideo Wanderers, Rosa was Gustavo Ferrín's assistant at Cerro in 2016. In August of that year, he replaced Elio Rodríguez at the helm of Canadian.

In 2017, after a short period in charge of Huracán Buceo, Rosa joined Plaza Colonia as manager of the youth setup. On 28 March 2019, after the dismissal of Mario Szlafmyc, he was named interim manager of the first team, being confirmed in charge on 2 April.

On 30 January 2021, Rosa left Plaza Colonia on a mutual consent. He returned to Tacuarembó on 25 February, now as manager; on 14 December, after failing to achieve promotion from the Primera División Amateur, he left.

On 15 December 2021, Rosa moved to Ecuador after being named at the helm of Guayaquil Sport, with the club being renamed Búhos ULVR shortly after. On 5 December of the following year, he switched teams and countries again after being appointed in charge of Cantolao in Peru, but left on a mutual agreement on 12 April 2023.
