= Julio Fuentes (footballer) =

Uruguayan football manager (born 1968)

Personal information
- Full name: Julio César Fuentes Vicente
- Date of birth: 3 February 1968 (age 58)
- Place of birth: Montevideo, Uruguay
- Height: 1.80 m (5 ft 11 in)
- Position: Goalkeeper

Team information
- Current team: Puntarenas (manager)

Senior career*
Years	Team	Apps	(Gls)
1986–1993	River Plate Montevideo		
1994–1995	Sud América		
1996	Nacional Asunción		
1997	Cerro		
1998	Nacional Asunción		
1998–1999	Leones Negros		
2000	Rentistas		
2000	Deportes Tolima		
2001	Rentistas		
2002–2003	Liverpool Montevideo		
2004	Rampla Juniors	16	(0)

Managerial career
- 2006–2008: La Luz
- 2009: Deportivo Maldonado
- 2011–2012: 14 de Julho
- 2013–2014: Rentistas (youth)
- 2015–2016: Sud América (youth)
- 2016: Sud América
- 2017: Rentistas
- 2018: Rampla Juniors
- 2019: Aurora
- 2020: Central Español
- 2021–2023: La Luz
- 2023–2024: Rentistas
- 2024–: Puntarenas
- * Club domestic league appearances and goals

Julio César Fuentes Vicente (born 3 February 1968) is a Uruguayan football manager and former player who played as a goalkeeper. He is the current manager of Costa Rican club Puntarenas.

== Playing career ==
Born in Montevideo, Fuentes made his senior debut with hometown side River Plate. In 1996, after playing for Sud América, he moved abroad and joined Paraguayan side Nacional Asunción.

Fuentes played for a brief period with Cerro before returning to Nacional in 1998. He then represented Leones Negros UdeG, Rentistas (two stints), Deportes Tolima and Liverpool Montevideo before retiring with Rampla Juniors in 2004, aged 36.

== Managerial career ==
After retiring, Fuentes started his managerial career with La Luz in 2006. He then worked at Deportivo Maldonado in 2009, before moving to Brazil with 14 de Julho.

In 2013, Fuentes was in charge of Rentistas' youth categories, before joining Sud América in 2015, under the same capacity. On 22 April 2016, he was named interim manager of the first team of the latter, and remained as manager until the end of the year.

On 6 June 2017, Fuentes returned to Rentistas, now as first team manager. He left at the end of the season, and took over Rampla Juniors on 8 May 2018; on 11 September, however, he was sacked.

On 6 June 2019, Fuentes was named manager of Bolivian side Aurora, but resigned on 10 September. He later worked as a sporting director at La Luz, before being appointed Central Español manager on 14 October 2020.

As Central named Mario Szlafmyc as their manager in January 2021, Fuentes returned to La Luz, now as manager. He led the club to two consecutive promotions, the latter one to Primera División, and also reached the 2022 Copa Uruguay final.

On 17 February 2023, with just two matches into the new season, Fuentes left La Luz on a mutual agreement.
