= Nahuel Acosta =

Uruguayan footballer (born 1999)

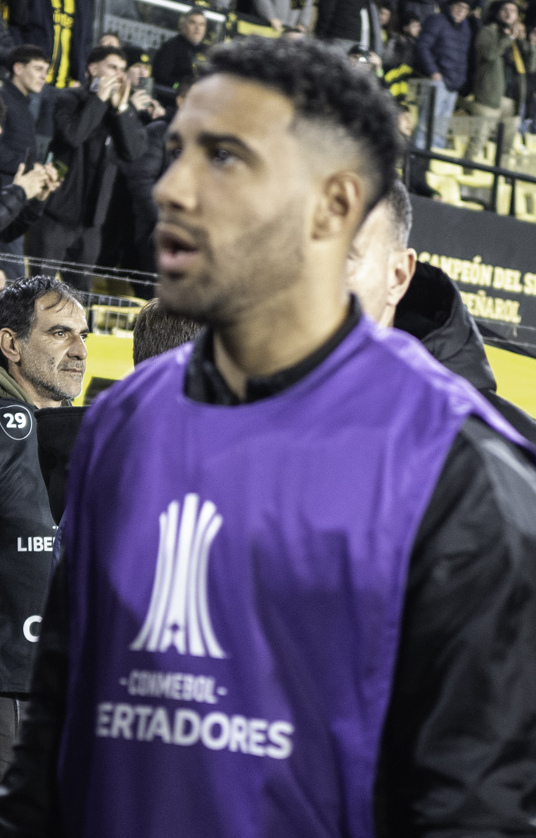

Personal information
- Full name: Nahuel Acosta da Silva
- Date of birth: 11 May 1999 (age 27)
- Place of birth: Montevideo, Uruguay
- Height: 1.79 m (5 ft 10 in)
- Position: Winger

Team information
- Current team: San Martín (SJ)

Senior career*
Years	Team	Apps	(Gls)
2019–2022	Rentistas	48	(2)
2021	Sud América	12	(0)
2022	Albion	8	(0)
2023	Cerro	23	(0)
2024–2026	Peñarol	6	(1)
2025	→ Blooming (loan)	7	(3)
2026–	San Martín (SJ)	1	(0)

International career^{‡}
2024–	Uruguay A'	1	(0)
- * Club domestic league appearances and goals ‡ National team caps and goals as of 19:10, 19 March 2026 (UTC)

Nahuel Acosta da Silva (born 11 May 1999) is a Uruguayan footballer who plays as a winger for Primera Nacional club San Martín (SJ).

== Life and career ==
Acosta was born in 1999 in Uruguay. He is a native of Montevideo, Uruguay. He is the son of Uruguayan footballer Gustavo Acosta. He initially operated as a striker before switching to winger. He mainly operates as a winger. He is known for his ability to take players on one-on-one. He started his career with Rentistas. He made forty-eight league appearances and scored two goals while playing for the club.

In 2021, Acosta signed for Sud América. He made twelve league appearances and scored zero goals while playing for the club. In 2022, he signed for Albion. He made eight league appearances and scored zero goals while playing for the club. In 2023, Acosta signed for Cerro. He made twenty-three league appearances and scored zero goals while playing for the club. In 2024, he signed for Uruguayan side Peñarol. In Juanury 2025 he was loaned to Bolivian first division side Blooming for a year. He has played for the Uruguay A' national football team.
