= Martín González (footballer) =

Uruguayan footballer (born 1994)

Personal information
- Full name: Richard Martín González Lamas
- Date of birth: 3 June 1994 (age 32)
- Height: 1.86 m (6 ft 1 in)
- Position: Centre-back

Team information
- Current team: Boston River
- Number: 30

Senior career*
Years	Team	Apps	(Gls)
2014–2015	Canadian	26	(0)
2015–2016	Rentistas	16	(1)
2016–2017	Fénix	27	(0)
2018–2019	Liverpool (URU)	6	(0)
2019	→ Cerro (loan)	18	(0)
2020	Cerro	22	(2)
2021	Rentistas	13	(0)
2022	Atenas	13	(0)
2023	Cerrito	11	(0)
2023	La Luz	10	(0)
2024	Cerro	16	(0)
2024–	Boston River	23	(1)
- * Club domestic league appearances and goals as of 1 October 2025

Richard Martín González Lamas (born 3 June 1994) is an Uruguayan professional footballer who plays for Boston River as a defender.

== Career ==
González has played for Canadian, Rentistas, Fénix, Liverpool (URU) and Cerro.
