= Marcelo Méndez (footballer) =

Uruguayan footballer (born 1981)

Personal information
- Full name: Marcelo Fabián Méndez Russo
- Date of birth: 10 January 1981 (age 45)
- Place of birth: Montevideo, Uruguay
- Height: 1.85 m (6 ft 1 in)
- Position: Centre-back

Team information
- Current team: Montevideo City Torque (manager)

Senior career*
Years	Team	Apps	(Gls)
2000–2004	Fénix	31	(1)
2005	Atlético Junior	9	(0)
2005–2006	Independiente	24	(0)
2006–2007	Kayserispor	26	(2)
2007	Peñarol	16	(0)
2008	Atlético Junior	12	(0)
2009	Montevideo Wanderers	15	(3)
2010	Astra	8	(0)
2010–2011	Independiente Rivadavia	11	(0)
2011–2013	Montevideo Wanderers	47	(5)
2013–2016	Huracán del Paso	51	(19)
Total		250	(30)

Managerial career
- 2016–2018: Progreso
- 2019: Danubio
- 2020–2021: Liverpool Montevideo
- 2021–2022: Atlético San Luis
- 2022–2023: Defensor Sporting
- 2024–2025: Gimnasia La Plata
- 2025–: Montevideo City Torque
- * Club domestic league appearances and goals

Marcelo Fabián Méndez Russo (born 10 January 1981) is a Uruguayan football manager and former player who played as a centre-back. He is the current manager of Montevideo City Torque.

== Playing career ==
In September 2006, he signed a two-year contract with Kayserispor. He was released in August 2007.

In February 2010 he signed for Astra.
