= Mario Szlafmyc =

Uruguayan football manager

Personal information
- Full name: Mario Szlafmyc Grimberg
- Date of birth: 9 August 1989 (age 37)
- Place of birth: Montevideo, Uruguay

Managerial career
- Years: Team
- 2010–2012: Rampla Juniors (youth)
- 2013–2014: Miramar Misiones (youth)
- 2014–2015: Fénix (youth)
- 2016: Defensa y Justicia (assistant)
- 2016: Miramar Misiones (youth)
- 2017: Plaza Colonia (reserves)
- 2017: Plaza Colonia (assistant)
- 2018–2019: Plaza Colonia
- 2020: Talleres (assistant)
- 2021–2022: Central Español
- 2022: Cerrito
- 2024: Uruguay Montevideo

Mario Szlafmyc Grimberg (born 9 August 1989) is a Uruguayan football manager.

== Career ==
Born in Montevideo, Szlafmyc studied Economics before switching taking a technical course to become a football manager at the age of 18. He worked as a youth coach for Rampla Juniors, Miramar Misiones and Fénix before being invited by manager Ariel Holan to join his staff at Argentine side Defensa y Justicia in the end of 2015.

After Holan left Defensa, Szlafmyc returned to his home country and to Miramar, working as manager of the under-16 team. He was offered a role as manager of Plaza Colonia's reserves in early 2017, before being named first team manager of the latter on 11 January 2018.

Szlafmyc led Plaza back to the Primera División, but resigned on 27 March 2019. In July, he returned to Miramar to work as a sporting director, and subsequently joined Alexander Medina's staff at Talleres de Córdoba on 25 December.

On 20 February 2021, Szlafmyc was named in charge of Segunda División side Central Español. He was dismissed on 22 April 2022, and returned to the top tier on 7 June after taking over Cerrito.

On 9 July 2022, Szlafmyc resigned from Cerrito.

== Personal life ==
Born in Uruguay, Szlafmyc is of Polish descent.
