= Montevideo City Torque =

Uruguayan football club

Montevideo City
- Full name: Montevideo City Torque
- Nicknames: Torque; Celeste; La T
- Founded: 26 December 2007; 18 years ago (as Club Atlético Torque)
- Ground: Estadio Centenario
- Capacity: 60,235
- Owner: City Football Group
- President: Raúl Aquino
- Manager: Marcelo Méndez
- League: Liga AUF Uruguaya
- 2025: Liga AUF Uruguaya, 8th of 16
- Website: montevideocitytorque.com
Home colours	Away colours	Third colours

Clubs owned by CFG Listed in order of acquisition/foundation. Bold indicates the club was founded by CFG. * indicates the club was acquired by CFG. § indicates the club is co-owned. † indicates the club is no longer owned by CFG.
2008	(England) Manchester City*
2009–2012
2013	(United States) **New York City FC**^{§}
2014	(Australia) Melbourne City*
2014	(Japan) Yokohama F. Marinos*^{†}
2015–2016
2017	(Uruguay) Montevideo City*
2017	(Spain) Girona*^{§}
2018
2019	(China) Shenzhen Peng City*^{§}
2019	(India) Mumbai City^{†}
2020	(Belgium) Lommel*
2020	(France) Troyes*
2021
2022	(Italy) Palermo*^{§}
2023	(Brazil) Bahia*^{§}

The Montevideo City Torque is a Uruguayan football club based in Montevideo. The Torque currently play in the Uruguayan Primera División, having achieved promotion to the first tier the previous season.

Founded in 2007 as Club Atlético Torque, the club has been owned since April 2017 by the City Football Group, a subsidiary of Abu Dhabi United Group. Montevideo City Torque shares ties with teams such as Manchester City, New York City, Melbourne City, and Esporte Clube Bahia, as clubs that are also owned by CFG.

== History ==
Club crest between 2007 and 2020

Club Atlético Torque was founded on 26 December 2007 by Cancún-based Uruguayan businessman Raúl Aquino Reynoso, building on a vision of achieving glory from scratch. To help him build his dream, Aquino contacted Marcelo Yaurreche, an electromechanic by trade, who had blogged on the concept of sporting ventures. Yaurreche's line of work ultimately went on to inspire the name of the team through the mechanical principle of torque as an indication of strength. The nascent club's first season of competition was played in the local Liga de Punta Carretas.

=== Segunda División Amateur ===
Starting from the 2008–09, Torque entered the Uruguayan football league system in the third (and lowest) tier, the Segunda División Amateur. Their first season was very positive, going unbeaten for the 11 games of the Clausura tournament before losing the play-off for the overall league title against Oriental. Oriental opted to turn down their promotion to the Segunda División, prompting Torque to submit an application to take it up in their place, but their application was rejected.

In the following seasons the club continued to place highly, never finishing lower than fifth in either the Apertura or Clausura tournaments. In May 2011 Torque merged with Huracán of the Segunda División to form a new club called Huracán Torque, but by August of the same year the merger was dissolved with the new side having played no games. Torque resumed its place in the Segunda División Amateur and at the fourth time of asking finally finished top of the overall table, winning promotion to the Segunda División for the 2012–13 season.

=== Segunda División Profesional ===
Torque's first season in professional football again finished positively with a fifth-place finish, including denying high-flyers Tacuarembó automatic promotion to the Uruguayan top tier and potentially even the league title itself with a 4–0 victory in the final game of the season. Torque themselves qualified for the promotion play-offs, where they again defeated Tacuarembó, but they ultimately lost the play-off final on penalties.

The following season was the club's first season of underachievement with Torque finishing in last place and eight points adrift of their nearest competitor. They were, however, spared the ignominy of relegation as the division expanded to 15 clubs, causing the league's organisers to opt against relegating any clubs. The following seasons offered little improvement, with the club finishing some distance from the promotion places each time.

=== City Football Group acquisition and promotion to the Primera División ===
On 20 March 2017, Uruguayan online sports news site Ovacion reported that the City Football Group, a subsidiary of Abu Dhabi United Group that also owns teams such as Manchester City and New York City FC, were close to completing negotiations for the purchase of Torque with the aim of using the club to assist in the signing of South American players. Also reported was that CFG had been working with the club for some time in anticipation of the purchase to build it a new sports complex as well as to refurbish the Estadio Juan Antonio Lavalleja in Minas with a view to relocating the side to the city in order to help establish an identity for the club as well as to give it a larger potential fanbase.

Following a series of further rumours of the imminence of the deal, it was publicly announced on 5 April 2017 that the takeover had been completed and ratified by the Uruguayan Football Association.

In 2017, led by Paulo Pezzolano, Torque formed a very strong team for the category and achieved the title with ease. Football players of the stature of Diego Martiñones, Ernesto Goñi, Hernán Figueredo, Martín Bonjour, Jonathan Cubero, Julián Lalinde and Leonardo Pais, among others; added to quality foreign reinforcements such as the Venezuelan Nahuel Ferraresi, the Colombian Javier Calle and the Argentine Valentín Castellanos. As soon as the promotion was confirmed, Pezzolano announced that he would not continue in the next season. Pablo Marini, another Argentine, was brought in to replace him.

In the debut in the Primera División, the team will be directed by the Argentine Pablo Marini.

Qualification for the play-off of the Torneo Intermedio, which Torque lost 3–2 to Nacional, was tempered by a poor run of results in both the Torneo Apertura and the Torneo Clausura, and Torque were relegated in 14th place based on average points per game at the end of the 2018 season. The 2019 season saw Torque take the Segunda División title for a second time as they beat Maldonado by three points to win the title on the final day of the season.

=== Name change and return to the Primera División ===
On 22 January 2020 it was announced that Club Atletico Torque had changed their club name to Montevideo City Torque, with an accompanying change in team badge. The name and badge were chosen to be reflective of their links to Manchester City and the other clubs of the City Football Group. At the same time it was announced that the club would begin work on the construction of a new academy and administrative complex, intended to be one of the most advanced academy centres in South America. The first phase of the complex was inaugurated in March 2021.

== Uniform ==
- First uniform: light blue shirt, black pants, black averages.
- Second uniform: white shirt, black pants, black averages.

All Torque title shirts have been light blue, but from 2016 on, the shirt has included a big blue "T" on the chest on a light blue background. The alternative shirts are generally white, although it was gray in 2013. It is currently white with a big blue "T".

**2008-13**	**2013**	**Alternative**; **2008-2013**	**Alternative**; **2013**	**2016**	**2016**	**2017**	**2018**	**Alternative**; **2018**	**2019**	**Alternative**; **2019**

=== Manufacturers ===
Period	Manufacturers
2008-2013	(Uruguay) MGR
2012-2013	(Uruguay) Mategeor
2013-2016	(Uruguay) Fit
2017-2019	(Spain) Luanvi
2019-	(Germany) Puma

== Players ==
=== First team squad ===
As of 22 March, 2026

Note: Flags indicate national team as defined under FIFA eligibility rules; some limited exceptions apply. Players may hold more than one non-FIFA nationality.

No.	Pos.	Nation	Player
1	GK	URU	Franco Torgnascioli
2	DF	URU	Franco Romero
3	DF	ARG	Kevin Silva
4	DF	URU	Valentino Würth
5	DF	URU	Franco Pizzichillo
6	DF	URU	Nahuel Leivas
7	FW	ARG	Luka Andrade
8	MF	URU	Pablo Siles
9	FW	URU	Salomón Rodríguez (on loan from Colo-Colo)
10	MF	ARG	Esteban Obregón
11	FW	URU	Nahuel Da Silva
13	GK	URU	Gastón Rodríguez
14	MF	ARG	Bautista Kociubinski (on loan from Estudiantes)
15	DF	URU	Ezequiel Busquets
16	FW	URU	Ignacio Molina

No.	Pos.	Nation	Player
17	DF	URU	Eduardo Agüero
18	MF	URU	Ramiro Lecchini
19	FW	ARG	Diogo Guzmán
20	MF	URU	Gonzalo Montes (on loan from Universidad de Chile)
23	MF	URU	Lucas Duré
24	DF	URU	Gary Kagelmacher (captain)
26	DF	URU	Facundo Silvera
27	DF	URU	José Tarán
29	FW	ARG	Facundo Martínez
30	DF	URU	Juan Quintana
31	FW	URU	Andrés Muñoz
32	MF	URU	Sebastián Cáceres
34	DF	URU	Fabricio Silveira

== Club information ==
Updated data for the 2018 season

- Seasons in Uruguayan Primera División: 2 (2018, 2020)
  - Debut: 2018
- First match: Torque 2–4 Nacional, on 3 February 2018
- First goal in history: Jhoaho Hinestroza (Torque 2–4 Nacional, 3 February 2018)
- Seasons in Uruguayan Segunda División: 7 (2012–13 to 2017, 2019).
  - Debut: 2012–13
- Seasons in Uruguayan Tercera División: 4 (2008–09 to 2011–12)
- First match: Torque 0–2 Platense, on 12 October 2008.
- First goal in history: Gonzalo Larrosa (Torque 2–3 Uruguay Montevideo, on 16 October 2008).
- First triumph: Torque 2–1 CA Basáñez, on 1 November 2008.

=== Trajectory ===
Season	Division	Position	Points
2008–09	2ªB	7º	38
2009–10	2ªB	3º	43
2010–11	2ªB	4º	50
2011–12	2ªB	**1º**	64
2012–13	2ª	5º	44
2013–14	2ª	14º	15
2014–15	2ª	10º	35
2015–16	2ª	7º	27
2016	2ª	6ª	15
2017	2ª	**1°**	53
2018	1ª	**14°**	41
2019	2ª	**1°**	43
2020	1ª	4°	61
2021	1ª	3°	50
2022	1ª	13°	36
2023	1ª	**10°**	45
2024	2ª	**3°**	54
2025	1ª	3°	7

== Honours ==
- **Torneo Competencia Segunda División**
  - Winners (1): 2024
- **Segunda División**
  - Winners (2): 2017, 2019
- **Tercera División**
  - Winners (1): 2011–12
  - Runners-up (1): 2008–09

== See also ==
- Manchester City FC
- Melbourne City FC
- New York City FC
- Mumbai City FC
