= 2011–12 Campeonato Uruguayo Primera División =

108th season of the top-tier football league in Uruguay

Liga Profesional de Primera División
- Season: 2011–12
- Champions: Nacional (44th title)
- Relegated: Rampla Juniors; Cerrito; Rentistas
- 2013 Copa Libertadores: Nacional; Peñarol; Defensor Sporting
- 2012 Copa Sudamericana: Nacional; Cerro Largo; Liverpool; Danubio
- Matches: 241
- Goals: 663 (2.75 per match)
- Top goalscorer: Richard Porta (17 goals)
- Biggest home win: Nacional 6–1 Cerrito (April 15, 2012)
- Biggest away win: Rampla Juniors 1–7 Peñarol (May 28, 2012)
- Highest scoring: Liverpool 5–4 Fénix (May 19, 2012)
- Longest winning run: 8 games: Defensor Sporting
- Longest unbeaten run: 14 games: Defensor Sporting
- Longest winless run: 17 games: Fénix; Rentistas
- Longest losing run: 6 games: Bella Vista

The 2011–12 Liga Profesional de Primera División season, also known as the 2011–12 Copa Uruguaya or the 2011–12 Campeonato Uruguayo, was the 108th season of Uruguay's top-flight football league, and the 81st in which it was professional. Nacional was the defending champion.

== Teams ==
Sixteen teams competed in the Primera División this season. Thirteen teams remained from the 2010–11 season. Miramar Misiones, Tacuarembó, and Central Español were relegated after accumulating the fewest points in the relegation table. They were replaced by Rentistas, Cerrito, and Cerro Largo, the 2010–11 Segunda División winner, runner-up, and playoff winner, respectively. All of the new teams are making repeat appearances. All the teams in this season are from Montevideo, except Cerro Largo, who is from Melo.

Locations of the 2011−12 Primera División teams outside Montevideo.
Locations of the 2011−12 Primera División teams within Montevideo.

Club	City	Stadium	Capacity
Bella Vista	Montevideo	José Nasazzi	15,000
Cerrito	Montevideo	Parque Maracaná	8,000
Cerro	Montevideo	Luis Tróccoli	25,000
Cerro Largo	Melo	Arquitecto Antonio Eleuterio Ubilla	9,000
Danubio	Montevideo	Jardines Del Hipódromo	18,000
Defensor Sporting	Montevideo	Luis Franzini	18,000
El Tanque Sisley	Montevideo	Dr. Victor Della Valle	6,000
Fénix	Montevideo	Parque Capurro	10,000
Liverpool	Montevideo	Belvedere	10,000
Montevideo Wanderers	Montevideo	Parque Alfredo Víctor Viera	11,000
Nacional	Montevideo	Gran Parque Central	23,000
Peñarol	Montevideo	Las Acacias	12,000
Racing	Montevideo	Osvaldo Roberto	8,500
Rampla Juniors	Montevideo	Olímpico	9,500
Rentistas	Montevideo	Complejo Rentistas	10,000
River Plate	Montevideo	Parque Federico Omar Saroldi	6,000

=== Personnel and kits ===
Note: Flags indicate national team as has been defined under FIFA eligibility rules. Players may hold more than one non-FIFA nationality.

Team	Manager^{1}	Captain	Kit manufacturer	Shirt main sponsor
Bella Vista	(Uruguay) Diego Alonso	(Uruguay) Marcelo Martuciello	Matgeor	Rinde dos
Cerrito	(Uruguay) Gerardo Schiavo (interim)	(Uruguay) Nélson Techera	Mgr Sport	Ottonello
Cerro	(Uruguay) Gabriel Camacho (interim)	(Uruguay) Óscar Javier Morales	Mitre	Kühl
Cerro Largo	(Uruguay) Danielo Núñez	(Uruguay) Daniel Leites	Mass	Núñez
Danubio	(Uruguay) Daniel Sánchez	(Uruguay) Damián Malrrechaufe	Mass	Asociación Española
Defensor Sporting	(Uruguay) Gustavo Díaz	(Uruguay) Andrés Fleurquin	Penalty	Médica Uruguaya
El Tanque Sisley	(Uruguay) Raúl Moller	(Uruguay) Federico Velázquez	Matgeor	La Cabaña
Fénix	(Uruguay) Lorenzo Carrabs (interim)	(Uruguay) Claudio Rivero	Mgr Sport	Rati salil
Liverpool	(Uruguay) Julio César Antúnez	(Uruguay) Emiliano Alfaro	Mgr Sport	Puritas
Montevideo Wanderers	(Uruguay) Alfredo Arias	(Uruguay) Antonio Pacheco	Mgr Sport	Cymaco
Nacional	(Argentina) Marcelo Gallardo	(Uruguay) Alexander Medina	Umbro	Macri Sports Center
Peñarol	(Uruguay) Jorge da Silva	(Uruguay) Darío Rodríguez	Puma	Antel
Racing	(Uruguay) Jorge Giordano	(Uruguay) Rodrigo Brasesco	Mass	Punta Ballena
Rampla Juniors	(Uruguay) Eduardo Favaro	(Uruguay) Javier Benia	Mgr Sport	Buquebus
Rentistas	(Uruguay) Edgardo Arias	(Uruguay) Diego Bonilla	Mgr Sport	Natal
River Plate	(Uruguay) Guillermo Almada	(Uruguay) Cristian González	Mass	Macro Mercado

- ^{1} According to current revision League managers

=== Managerial changes ===
Team	Outgoing manager	Manner of departure	Date of vacancy	Replaced by	Date of appointment	Position in table
Pre-season changes
Liverpool	Eduardo Favaro	End of contract	June 7, 2011	Diego Demarco	June 16, 2011	N/A
Rampla Juniors	Jorge Giordano	End of contract	June 15, 2011	Eduardo Del Capellán	June 17, 2011	N/A
Nacional	Juan Ramón Carrasco	Resigned	June 17, 2011	Marcelo Gallardo	June 29, 2011	N/A
Danubio	Gustavo Machaín (interim)	Resigned to be sport manager of club	June 17, 2011	Daniel Sánchez	June 28, 2011	N/A
Season changes
El Tanque Sisley	Rubén Da Silva	Sacked	August 29, 2011	Raúl Moller	August 29, 2011	15th
Peñarol	Diego Aguirre	Signed by Al Rayyan	September 5, 2011	Gregorio Pérez	September 5, 2011	3rd
Bella Vista	Pablo Alonso	Resigned	September 11, 2011	Diego Alonso	September 14, 2011	16th
Liverpool	Diego Demarco	Resigned	October 2, 2011	Julio César Antúnez	October 3, 2011	12th
Rampla Juniors	Eduardo Del Capellán	Resigned	November 7, 2011	Fernando Araújo	November 7, 2011	14th
Rentistas	Julio César Balerio	Sacked	November 7, 2011	Edgardo Arias	November 7, 2011	16th
Montevideo Wanderers	Daniel Carreño	Signed by Palestino	November 28, 2011	Alfredo Arias	December 13, 2011	10th
Defensor Sporting	Pablo Repetto	Sacked	December 9, 2011	Gustavo Díaz	December 18, 2011	6th
Racing	Osvaldo Streccia	End of contract	December 10, 2011	Jorge Giordano	December 22, 2011	11th
Cerro	Ricardo Ortíz	Sacked	December 20, 2011	Hugo Parga	December 28, 2011	7th
Peñarol	Gregorio Pérez	Sacked	February 26, 2012	Jorge da Silva	March 1, 2012	2nd
Cerro	Hugo Parga	Sacked	May 2, 2012	Gabriel Camacho (interim)	May 2, 2012	9th
Rampla Juniors	Fernando Araújo	Sacked	May 2, 2012	Eduardo Favaro	May 3, 2012	11th
Fénix	Rosario Martínez	Resigned	May 13, 2012	Lorenzo Carrabs (interim)	May 13, 2012	15th

== Torneo Apertura ==
The Torneo Apertura "Juan José Tudurí" was the first tournament of the season. It began on August 13, 2011.

=== Standings ===
Pos	Team	Pld	W	D	L	GF	GA	GD	Pts	Qualification
1	Nacional (C)	15	9	5	1	30	11	+19	32	Championship Playoffs
2	Danubio	15	8	5	2	19	8	+11	31 (Note: Danubio won the points of the match against Racing because Racing fielded an ineligible player (Marcelo Sosa).)	
3	Peñarol	15	9	3	3	30	12	+18	30	
4	River Plate	15	8	4	3	22	17	+5	28	
5	Cerro Largo	15	8	3	4	18	16	+2	27	
6	Defensor Sporting	15	7	3	5	23	16	+7	24	
7	Cerro	15	7	3	5	17	12	+5	24	
8	Liverpool	15	6	1	8	17	18	−1	19	
9	El Tanque Sisley	15	5	3	7	15	23	−8	18	
10	Montevideo Wanderers	15	5	2	8	23	25	−2	17	
11	Racing	15	4	6	5	20	23	−3	17	
12	Rampla Juniors	15	5	1	9	16	22	−6	16	
13	Fénix	15	4	4	7	15	22	−7	16	
14	Rentistas	15	4	2	9	10	21	−11	14	
15	Cerrito	15	3	4	8	10	23	−13	13	
16	Bella Vista	15	3	1	11	9	25	−16	10	

Source: AUF
Rules for classification: 1) points; 2) goal difference; 3) number of goals scored.
(C) Champions

=== Results ===
Home \ Away	BVI	CSC	CRR	CRL	DAN	DFS	ETS	FNX	LIV	WAN	NAC	PEÑ	RAC	RAM	REN	RIV
Bella Vista		0–1	0–0				1–2				1–0	0–3	0–1			
Cerrito				0–0			0–1		1–2		0–3	0–5	0–0		1–0	0–0
Cerro		3–1		0–1					2–1	1–0	0–0	0–0	2–3			2–0
Cerro Largo	1–0				1–0	0–3	3–0		1–0			0–0		3–2	1–0	
Danubio	4–1	1–0	1–0					4–0		1–0	1–1		1–1			0–0
Defensor Sporting	2–1	1–1	2–3		0–1			0–1						2–0	1–0	0–2
El Tanque Sisley			2–0		1–1	2–2		0–2	0–1	3–2					2–0	1–1
Fénix	2–1	3–1	0–3	1–1					1–2	3–3				0–1		1–2
Liverpool	2–0				1–2	2–3					0–1	3–0		0–1		1–2
Montevideo Wanderers	4–0	3–1		3–2		0–2			0–1		1–3			2–0		0–3
Nacional				4–0		2–2	3–0	0–0				2–1	3–2		3–0	
Peñarol					2–1	1–0	2–0	2–1		1–2				4–1		
Racing				1–3		0–3	3–0	0–0	1–1	3–2		2–2		1–3		
Rampla Juniors	0–1	1–3	0–1		0–0		2–1				0–2				4–0	
Rentistas	2–1		1–0		0–1			2–0	3–0	1–1		0–3	1–1			
River Plate	1–2			2–1							3–3	0–4	2–1	2–1	2–0	

Updated to match(es) played on December 4, 2011.. Source:
Legend: Blue = home team win; Yellow = draw; Red = away team win.

=== Top goalscorers ===
Rank	Player	Nationality	Club	Goals
1	Marcelo Zalayeta	Uruguayan	Peñarol	8
2	Emiliano Alfaro	Uruguayan	Liverpool	7
3	João Pedro	Brazilian	Peñarol	6
3	Gonzalo Mastriani	Uruguayan	Cerro	6
3	Alexander Medina	Uruguayan	Nacional	6
3	Richard Núñez	Uruguayan	Rampla Juniors	6
3	Pablo Olivera	Uruguayan	River Plate	6
8	Braian Alemán	Uruguayan	Defensor Sporting	5
8	Anibal Hernández	Uruguayan	Racing	5
8	Gastón Machado	Uruguayan	El Tanque Sisley	5
8	Juan Manuel Ortiz	Uruguayan	Fénix	5
8	Antonio Pacheco	Uruguayan	Montevideo Wanderers	5
8	Álvaro Recoba	Uruguayan	Nacional	5
8	Ignacio Risso	Uruguayan	Defensor Sporting	5
8	Nicolás Royón	Uruguayan	Liverpool	5

Updated as of games played on December 4, 2011.

=== Attendances ===
#	Football club	Average attendance
1	Peñarol	20,500
2	Club Nacional de Football	17,133
3	Liverpool Fútbol Club	8,960
4	CA Bella Vista	5,220
5	Racing Club de Montevideo	4,580
6	Cerrito	3,675
7	Cerro Largo	3,563
8	Montevideo Wanderers	3,322
9	Rentistas	3,019
10	Danubio	2,293
11	CARP	1,880
12	CA Cerro	1,850
13	Defensor Sporting	1,717
14	Rampla Juniors	1,250
15	Fénix	1,206
16	El Tanque Sisley	521

Source: World Football

== Torneo Clausura ==
The Torneo Clausura is the second tournament of the season. It runs from 2/18/2012 to 05/26/12.

=== Standings ===
Pos	Team	Pld	W	D	L	GF	GA	GD	Pts	Qualification
1	Defensor Sporting (C)	15	12	2	1	31	11	+20	38	Championship Playoffs
2	Nacional	15	11	2	2	38	20	+18	35	
3	Liverpool	15	11	1	3	31	21	+10	34	
4	Peñarol	15	10	2	3	41	18	+23	32	
5	Cerro Largo	15	8	3	4	28	18	+10	27	
6	Montevideo Wanderers	15	7	3	5	26	25	+1	24	
7	River Plate	15	6	4	5	28	23	+5	22	
8	Danubio	15	5	6	4	18	18	0	21	
9	Bella Vista	15	6	2	7	19	21	−2	20	
10	Racing	15	5	2	8	21	30	−9	17	
11	Rampla Juniors	15	4	3	8	18	33	−15	15	
12	El Tanque Sisley	15	4	1	10	14	25	−11	13	
13	Cerro	15	3	3	9	18	25	−7	12	
14	Cerrito	15	2	5	8	14	29	−15	11	
15	Fénix	15	1	6	8	18	25	−7	9	
16	Rentistas	15	0	5	10	9	30	−21	5	

Rules for classification: 1st points; 2nd goal difference; 3rd goals scored; 4th head-to-head results; 5th draw.
(C) Champions

=== Results ===
Home \ Away	BVI	CSC	CRR	CRL	DAN	DFS	ETS	FNX	LIV	WAN	NAC	PEÑ	RAC	RAM	REN	RIV
Bella Vista				1–2	2–1	0–1		0–0	1–2	2–2				3–1	1–0	0–1
Cerrito	3–2		1–4		1–0	0–2		1–1		1–2				0–0		
Cerro	0–2				1–2	2–3	1–0	1–1						0–0	3–0	
Cerro Largo		2–1	1–0					2–0		3–0	4–2		2–2			0–3
Danubio				1–1		0–1	2–1		0–0			3–2		3–2	1–1	
Defensor Sporting				2–1			3–0		4–2	2–1	2–2	0–0	5–1			
El Tanque Sisley	1–2	3–2		0–3							0–1	0–2	3–0	1–3		
Fénix					1–1	0–1	0–2				0–2	2–2	2–3		1–1	
Liverpool		3–1	2–1	2–1			1–0	5–4		1–2			2–1		2–1	
Montevideo Wanderers			3–1		1–1		1–3	2–1				1–5	3–0		3–0	
Nacional	3–1	6–1	3–0		3–1				4–3	2–0				1–1		3–2
Peñarol	4–1	1–0	3–1	4–2					0–1		2–3		4–2		4–1	1–0
Racing	0–1	0–0	1–0		0–1						1–0				3–1	4–2
Rampla Juniors				0–3		0–2		0–4	0–2	1–3		1–7	4–3			2–1
Rentistas		1–1		1–1		0–2	0–0				2–3			0–3		0–2
River Plate		2–2	3–3		1–1	2–1	4–0	2–1	1–3	2–2						

Updated to match(es) played on June 2, 2012.. Source:
Legend: Blue = home team win; Yellow = draw; Red = away team win.

=== Top goalscorers ===
Rank	Player	Nationality	Club	Goals
1	Richard Porta	Uruguayan	Nacional	14
2	Diego Vera	Uruguayan	Liverpool	13
3	Rino Lucas	Uruguayan	Cerro Largo	12
4	Sebastián Taborda	Uruguayan	River Plate	11
5	Diego Martiñones	Uruguayan	Danubio	10
5	Rodrigo Mora	Uruguayan	Peñarol	10
5	Nicolás Olivera	Uruguayan	Defensor Sporting	10
8	Rodrigo Pastorini	Uruguayan	Racing	8
8	Marcelo Zalayeta	Uruguayan	Peñarol	8
10	Mauro Guevgeozian	Uruguayan	Peñarol	7

Updated as of games played on June 2, 2012.

=== Attendances ===
#	Football club	Average attendance
1	Peñarol	21,500
2	Club Nacional de Football	15,400
3	Defensor Sporting	8,200
4	Rentistas	4,088
5	Montevideo Wanderers	3,933
6	El Tanque Sisley	3,800
7	Fénix	3,583
8	Racing Club de Montevideo	3,525
9	Danubio	3,340
10	Cerro Largo	3,260
11	CARP	2,380
12	Liverpool Fútbol Club	1,933
13	Rampla Juniors	1,875
14	CA Bella Vista	1,117
15	CA Cerro	983
16	Cerrito	467

Source: World Football

== Aggregate table ==
Pos	Team	Pld	W	D	L	GF	GA	GD	Pts	Qualification
1	Nacional	30	20	7	3	68	31	+37	67	2013 Copa Libertadores Second Stage and 2012 Copa Sudamericana First Stage (Note: Nacional qualified for the 2012 Copa Sudamericana as the Primera División champion.) (Note: As Nacional defeated Defensor Sporting in the initial playoff and became champion, the final was not played, and Peñarol became the runner-up as the 2nd best team in the aggregate table. Both Nacional and Peñarol qualified for the 2013 Copa Libertadores group stage. Defensor Sporting appealed against the decision of the AUF that Peñarol is Uruguay 2 in the 2013 Copa Libertadores, but was not accepted.)
2	Peñarol	30	19	5	6	71	30	+41	62	2013 Copa Libertadores Second Stage
3	Defensor Sporting	30	19	5	6	54	27	+27	62	2013 Copa Libertadores First Stage (Note: Defensor Sporting qualified for the 2013 Copa Libertadores first stage as the 3rd best team in the aggregate table.)
4	Cerro Largo	30	16	6	8	46	34	+12	54	2012 Copa Sudamericana First Stage
5	Liverpool	30	17	2	11	48	39	+9	53	2012 Copa Sudamericana First Stage
6	Danubio	30	13	11	6	37	26	+11	52 (Note: Danubio won the points of the match against Racing because Racing fielded an ineligible player (Marcelo Sosa).)	2012 Copa Sudamericana First Stage
7	River Plate	30	14	8	8	50	40	+10	50	
8	Montevideo Wanderers	30	12	5	13	49	50	−1	41	
9	Cerro	30	10	6	14	35	37	−2	36	
10	Racing	30	9	8	13	41	53	−12	34	
11	El Tanque Sisley	30	9	4	17	29	48	−19	31	
12	Rampla Juniors	30	9	4	17	34	55	−21	31	
13	Bella Vista	30	9	3	18	28	46	−18	30	
14	Fénix	30	5	10	15	33	47	−14	25	
15	Cerrito	30	5	9	16	24	52	−28	24	
16	Rentistas	30	4	7	19	19	51	−32	19	

Source: AUF
Rules for classification: 1) points; 2) goal difference; 3) number of goals scored.

=== Top goalscorers ===
Rank	Player	Nationality	Club	Goals
1	Richard Porta	Australian	Nacional	17
2	Marcelo Zalayeta	Uruguayan	Peñarol	16
3	Rino Lucas	Uruguayan	Cerro Largo	15
4	Diego Vera	Uruguayan	Liverpool	13
5	Gonzalo Mastriani	Uruguayan	Cerro	12
5	Pablo Olivera	Uruguayan	River Plate	12
5	Sebastián Taborda	Uruguayan	River Plate	12
8	Nicolás Olivera	Uruguayan	Defensor Sporting	11
9	Diego Martiñones	Uruguayan	Danubio	10
9	Rodrigo Mora	Uruguayan	Peñarol	10
9	Richard Núñez	Uruguayan	Rampla Juniors	10
9	Antonio Pacheco	Uruguayan	Montevideo Wanderers	10

Updated as of games played on May 27, 2012.

=== Hat-tricks ===
Player	For	Against	Result	Date
(Uruguay) Diego Perrone	Danubio	Bella Vista	4–1	December 4, 2011
(Uruguay) Diego Martiñones	Danubio	Peñarol	3–2	April 1, 2012
(Australia) Richard Porta	Nacional	Bella Vista	3–1	April 8, 2012
(Australia) Richard Porta	Nacional	Cerrito	6–1	April 15, 2012
(Uruguay) Rodrigo Pastorini	Racing	Rentistas	3–1	April 29, 2012
(Uruguay) Rodrigo Mora^{4}	Peñarol	Rampla Juniors	7–1	May 27, 2012

- ^{4} Player scored 4 goals

== Relegation ==
Pos	Team	Pld	W	D	L	GF	GA	GD	Pts	Relegation
1	Nacional	60	39	13	8	128	61	+67	130	
2	Defensor Sporting	60	36	12	12	104	52	+52	120	
3	Peñarol	60	34	12	14	123	67	+56	114	
4	Cerro Largo	30	16	6	8	46	34	+12	108 (Note: Having only played one season in the Primera División, Cerrito's, Cerro Largo's, and Rentistas' points are doubled for the relegation table.)	
5	Liverpool	60	27	12	21	88	78	+10	93	
6	Danubio	60	24	19	17	77	67	+10	93 (Note: Danubio won the points of the match against Racing because Racing fielded an ineligible player (Marcelo Sosa).)	
7	River Plate	60	24	13	23	94	97	−3	85	
8	Montevideo Wanderers	60	22	16	22	93	83	+10	82	
9	Cerro	61	20	18	23	69	75	−6	78	
10	Bella Vista	60	21	11	28	70	83	−13	74	
11	Racing	60	19	17	24	81	96	−15	73	
12	El Tanque Sisley	60	21	9	30	69	97	−28	72	
13	Fénix	60	16	22	22	77	82	−5	70	
14	Rampla Juniors (R)	59	16	14	29	72	107	−35	62	Relegation to the 2012–13 Segunda División
15	Cerrito (R)	30	5	9	16	24	52	−28	48	Relegation to the 2012–13 Segunda División
16	Rentistas (R)	30	4	7	19	20	50	−30	38	Relegation to the 2012–13 Segunda División

Source: AUF
Rules for classification: 1) points; 2) goal difference; 3) number of goals scored.
(R) Relegated

== Championship playoff ==
Nacional and Defensor Sporting qualified to the championship playoffs as the Apertura and Clausura winners, respectively. Additionally, Nacional re-qualified as the team with the most points in the season aggregate table. Given this situation, an initial playoff was held between the two teams. Nacional would become the season champion with a win; Defensor Sporting needed to win the playoff to force a two-legged final.

Semi-final			Finals
			Aggregate table first place	Nacional	—	—	—
Apertura winners	Nacional	1		Nacional	—	—	—
Clausura winners	Defensor Sporting	0

=== Semi-final ===
June 16, 2012
15:00 UTC−03:00

Nacional	1–0	Defensor Sporting
Recoba 41'	Report

Estadio Centenario, Montevideo
Attendance: 60,000
Referee: Darío Ubriaco

Nacional	Defensor Sporting

NACIONAL:
GK	25	(Uruguay) Jorge Bava	(yellow card) 88'
RB	4	(Uruguay) Christian Núñez
CB	19	(Uruguay) Andrés Scotti	(yellow card) 23'
CB	6	(Uruguay) Alexis Rolín	(yellow card) 50'
LB	14	(Argentina) Diego Placente	(yellow card) 39'	(substituted off) 72'
CM	8	(Uruguay) Matías Cabrera		(substituted off) 61'
CM	23	(Uruguay) Facundo Píriz	(yellow card) 71'
CM	17	(Uruguay) Maximiliano Calzada
AM	20	(Uruguay) Álvaro Recoba (c)
CF	10	(Uruguay) Tabaré Viudez		(substituted off) 14'
CF	7	(Australia) Richard Porta
Substitutes:
GK	1	(Uruguay) Leonardo Burián
DF	2	(Uruguay) Darwin Torres		(substituted on) 72'
MF	18	(Argentina) Israel Damonte	(yellow card) 74'	(substituted on) 61'
MF	24	(Argentina) Marcos Aguirre
FW	9	(Uruguay) Alexander Medina
FW	11	(Uruguay) Vicente Sánchez		(substituted on) 14'
FW	15	(Uruguay) Gonzalo Bueno
Manager:
(Argentina) Marcelo Gallardo

DEFENSOR SPORTING:
GK	1	(Uruguay) Yonathan Irrazábal
RB	21	(Uruguay) Pablo Pintos	(yellow card) 72'
CB	2	(Uruguay) Ramón Arias
CB	6	(Argentina) Néstor Moiraghi
LB	22	(Uruguay) Robert Herrera	(yellow card) 42'	(substituted off) 60'
DM	15	(Uruguay) Diego Martín Rodríguez
DM	5	(Uruguay) Diego Ferreira		(substituted off) 60'
RM	19	(Uruguay) Federico Pintos
LM	9	(Uruguay) Matías Britos
CF	11	(Uruguay) Nicolás Olivera (c)	(yellow card) 33'
CF	16	(Uruguay) Ignacio Risso		(substituted off) 60'
Substitutes:
GK	12	(Uruguay) Fernando Rodríguez
DF	4	(Uruguay) Mario Risso
DF	7	(Uruguay) Juan Amado		(substituted on) 60'
DF	20	(Uruguay) Diego Manuel Rodríguez		(substituted on) 60'
MF	10	(Uruguay) Brahian Alemán
MF	23	(Uruguay) Andrés Fleurquin
FW	8	(Uruguay) Diego Rolán		(substituted on) 75'
Manager:
(Uruguay) Gustavo Díaz

Man of the match:
(Uruguay) Álvaro Recoba
Assistant referees:
Gabriel Popovits
Gersei Gómez
Fourth official:
Heber Rodríguez

Primera División
2011–12 champion

44th title
