= 2010–11 Campeonato Uruguayo Primera División =

107th season of the top-tier football league in Uruguay

Liga Profesional de Primera División
- Season: 2010–11
- Champions: Nacional (43rd title)
- Relegated: Central Español; Tacuarembó; Miramar Misiones
- 2012 Copa Libertadores: Nacional; Defensor Sporting; Peñarol
- 2011 Copa Sudamericana: Nacional; Fénix; Bella Vista
- Matches: 241
- Goals: 671 (2.78 per match)
- Top goalscorer: Apertura: Santiago García (15 goals); Clausura: Cristian Palacios (15 goals); Overall: Santiago García (23 goals)
- Biggest home win: Racing 6–0 Danubio (May 7, 2011)
- Biggest away win: Cerro 1–5 Central Español (Feb. 13, 2011); Miramar Misiones 0–4 Liverpool (May 21, 2011); Miramar Misiones 0–4 Montevideo Wanderers (Jun. 4, 2011)
- Highest scoring: Central Español 3–5 El Tanque Sisley (Oct. 3, 2010)
- Longest winning run: 7 matches: Nacional (Mar. 29, 2011–Apr. 10, 2011)
- Longest unbeaten run: 9 matches: Liverpool (Sep. 26, 2010–Nov. 21, 2010); Nacional (Oct. 17, 2010–Feb. 5, 2011)
- Longest winless run: 11 matches: Tacuarembó (Sep. 25, 2010–Dec. 5, 2010); Miramar Misiones (Sep. 25, 2010–Dec. 4, 2010)
- Longest losing run: 9 matches: Tacuarembó (Oct. 10, 2010–Dec. 5, 2010)

The 2010–11 Liga Profesional de Primera División season, also known as the 2010–11 Copa Uruguaya or the 2010–11 Campeonato Uruguayo, was the 107th season of Uruguay's top-flight football league, and the 80th in which it was professional.

Nacional won their 43rd Primera División title after defeating Defensor Sporting in the season-ending final.

== Teams ==
Sixteen teams will compete in the Primera División this season. Thirteen teams remained from the 2009–10 season. Atenas, Cerrito, and Cerro Largo were relegated after accumulating the fewest points in the season aggregate table. They were replaced by El Tanque Sisley, Bella Vista, and Miramar Misiones, the 2009–10 Segunda División winner, runner-up, and playoff winner, respectively. All of the new teams are making repeat appearances. All the teams in this season are from Montevideo, except Tacuarembó F.C., who comes from the city they are named for.

Locations of the 2010–11 Primera División teams

Team	Home city	Stadium
Bella Vista	Montevideo	Estadio José Nasazzi
Central Español	Montevideo	Parque Palermo
Cerro	Montevideo	Estadio Luis Tróccoli
Danubio	Montevideo	Jardines Del Hipódromo
Defensor Sporting	Montevideo	Estadio Luis Franzini
El Tanque Sisley	Montevideo	Estadio Victor Della Valle
Fénix	Montevideo	Estadio Parque Capurro
Liverpool	Montevideo	Estadio Belvedere
Miramar Misiones	Montevideo	Parque Luis Méndez Piana
Montevideo Wanderers	Montevideo	Estadio Viera
Nacional	Montevideo	Estadio Gran Parque Central
Peñarol	Montevideo	Estadio Centenario
Racing	Montevideo	Estadio Osvaldo Roberto
Rampla Juniors	Montevideo	Estadio Olímpico
River Plate	Montevideo	Estadio Saroldi
Tacuarembó	Tacuarembó	Estadio Goyenola

== Torneo Apertura ==
The Torneo Apertura "Sudáfrica 2010" was the first tournament of the season. It began on August 21, 2010, and ended on December 5, 2010.

=== Standings ===
Pos	Team	Pld	W	D	L	GF	GA	GD	Pts	Qualification
1	Defensor Sporting	15	9	3	3	31	13	+18	30	Championship Playoffs
2	Nacional	15	8	5	2	28	18	+10	29	
3	Bella Vista	15	9	2	4	24	18	+6	29	
4	El Tanque Sisley	15	8	4	3	21	18	+3	28	
5	Danubio	15	7	5	3	24	14	+10	26	
6	Peñarol	15	7	4	4	24	17	+7	25	
7	Montevideo Wanderers	15	5	6	4	20	16	+4	21	
8	Liverpool	15	5	6	4	18	19	−1	21	
9	Cerro	15	4	7	4	15	17	−2	19	
10	Fénix	15	4	6	5	21	20	+1	18	
11	River Plate	15	5	3	7	16	23	−7	18	
12	Central Español	15	4	5	6	21	25	−4	17	
13	Racing	15	3	5	7	14	20	−6	14	
14	Rampla Juniors	15	2	6	7	19	27	−8	12	
15	Miramar Misiones	15	2	5	8	14	23	−9	11	
16	Tacuarembó	15	1	2	12	10	32	−22	5	

Rules for classification: 1st points; 2nd goal difference; 3rd goals scored; 4th head-to-head results; 5th draw.

=== Results ===
Home \ Away	BVI	CES	CRR	DAN	DFS	ETS	FNX	LIV	MMI	WAN	NAC	PEÑ	RAC	RAM	RIV	TAC
Bella Vista						1–2	0–0		3–2			1–2		3–2	1–0	3–2
Central Español	0–1		0–0			3–5			0–1	2–1	1–3	2–3	1–1			1–0
Cerro	2–4			0–0				2–1		1–1	4–1		1–1		0–0	
Danubio	2–0	4–2			1–1	2–0	1–0						2–0	3–3	1–2	
Defensor Sporting	1–2	1–1	2–0			3–1	5–1	3–0		1–2	1–2			4–1		
El Tanque Sisley			0–2					1–1		1–1	1–1		1–0	3–2		
Fénix		0–1	4–0			0–1			2–1			2–2	1–1			1–1
Liverpool	1–1	2–2		1–1			2–1		0–0	0–2			1–0	3–1		
Miramar Misiones			1–1	1–2	0–1	0–1					2–4				1–1	
Montevideo Wanderers	0–2			1–1			2–2		1–1		1–1			2–0	1–2	2–0
Nacional	1–0			2–1			0–3	0–0				0–0			6–1	3–0
Peñarol			2–1	1–0	0–1	0–0		1–2	3–1	2–1				1–1		
Racing	1–2				0–3				1–2	0–2	2–2	2–1			2–0	
Rampla Juniors		2–2	0–0				2–2		2–0		1–2		1–1		0–1	1–0
River Plate		1–3			1–1	1–2	1–2	1–2				2–1				2–0
Tacuarembó			0–1	0–3	1–3	1–2		3–2	1–1			1–5	0–2			

Legend: Blue = home team win; Yellow = draw; Red = away team win.

=== Top goalscorers ===
Rank	Player	Nationality	Club	Goals
1	Santiago García	Uruguayan	Nacional	15
2	Rodrigo Mora	Uruguayan	Defensor Sporting	11
3	Diego Alonso	Uruguayan	Peñarol	9
3	Federico Rodríguez	Uruguayan	Bella Vista	9
5	Nicolás Guevara	Argentine	Rampla Juniors	7
5	Diego Martiñones	Uruguayan	Central Español	7
7	Maximiliano Callorda	Uruguayan	El Tanque Sisley	6
7	Sebastián Gaitán	Uruguayan	El Tanque Sisley	6
7	Leonardo Medina	Uruguayan	Miramar Misiones	6
7	Federico Puppo	Uruguayan	River Plate	6
7	Diego Vera	Uruguayan	Liverpool	6

== Torneo Clausura ==
The Torneo Clausura is the second tournament of the season. It began on February 5, 2011, and ended on June 5, 2011.

=== Standings ===
Pos	Team	Pld	W	D	L	GF	GA	GD	Pts	Qualification
1	Nacional	15	11	1	3	32	13	+19	34	Championship Playoffs
2	Defensor Sporting	15	8	4	3	19	12	+7	28	
3	Peñarol	15	8	3	4	28	20	+8	27	
4	Fénix	15	7	6	2	23	15	+8	27	
5	Racing	15	7	3	5	26	22	+4	24	
6	Central Español	15	6	5	4	26	17	+9	23	
7	Cerro	15	6	4	5	19	22	−3	22	
8	Montevideo Wanderers	15	5	5	5	24	17	+7	20	
9	Liverpool	15	5	4	6	22	20	+2	19	
10	Rampla Juniors	15	5	4	6	18	25	−7	19	
11	Tacuarembó	15	6	1	8	17	26	−9	19	
12	River Plate	15	5	2	8	29	34	−5	17	
13	Bella Vista	15	3	6	6	16	18	−2	15	
14	Danubio	15	4	3	8	17	26	−9	15	
15	El Tanque Sisley	15	4	1	10	19	30	−11	13	
16	Miramar Misiones	15	2	3	10	12	30	−18	9	

Rules for classification: 1st points; 2nd goal difference; 3rd goals scored; 4th head-to-head results; 5th draw.

=== Results ===
Home \ Away	BVI	CES	CRR	DAN	DFS	ETS	FNX	LIV	MMI	WAN	NAC	PEÑ	RAC	RAM	RIV	TAC
Bella Vista		1–1	0–1	4–1	1–1			2–4		0–1	0–1		1–0			
Central Español				1–0	2–0		1–1	1–2						5–1	2–0	
Cerro		1–5			2–1	2–1	1–1		1–1			0–2		1–1		2–2
Danubio			1–0					3–2	5–2	0–0	0–1	0–1				3–1
Defensor Sporting				1–1					2–0			1–1	3–0		4–1	1–0
El Tanque Sisley	0–0	1–0		3–2	0–1		0–1		4–1			2–4			2–1	0–1
Fénix	2–2			1–0	0–1			0–0		2–2	2–1			3–0	4–1	
Liverpool			0–2		1–2	1–0					0–2	2–4			1–1	3–0
Miramar Misiones	0–0	0–1					0–1	0–4		0–4		3–0	1–1	1–2		1–0
Montevideo Wanderers		2–2	0–0		0–1	5–1		1–0				1–2	0–1			
Nacional		3–1	3–0		3–0	5–2			3–1	1–1			3–0	0–2		
Peñarol	2–1	2–2					1–1				0–1		0–1		1–4	5–0
Racing		1–1	1–2	6–0		2–1	2–4	1–1						3–2		3–2
Rampla Juniors	1–0			0–0	0–0	4–2		1–1		1–4		1–3				
River Plate	2–2		3–4	3–1					2–1	4–2	4–2		1–4	1–2		
Tacuarembó	1–2	2–1					3–0			2–1	0–3			1–0	2–1	

Legend: Blue = home team win; Yellow = draw; Red = away team win.

=== Top goalscorers ===
Rank	Player	Nationality	Club	Goals
1	Cristian Palacios	Uruguayan	Central Español	15
2	Santiago García	Uruguayan	Nacional	8
2	Maximiliano Pérez	Argentine	Fénix	8
2	Liber Quiñones	Uruguayan	Racing	8
5	Gabriel Álvez	Uruguayan	El Tanque Sisley	6
6	Emiliano Alfaro	Uruguayan	Liverpool	5
6	Jean Pierre Barrientos	Uruguayan	Racing	5
6	Gastón Colmán	Uruguayan	Tacuarembó	5
6	Antoine Helha	Cameroonian	El Tanque Sisley	5
6	Carlos Núñez	Uruguayan	Liverpool	5
6	Juan Manuel Olivera	Uruguayan	Peñarol	5
6	Antonio Pacheco	Uruguayan	Peñarol	5
6	Diego Perrone	Uruguayan	Danubio	5
6	Richard Porta	Uruguayan	Nacional	5
6	Jonathan Ramírez	Uruguayan	River Plate	5
6	Emiliano Tellechea	Uruguayan	Montevideo Wanderers	5
6	David Texeira	Uruguayan	Defensor Sporting	5

== Aggregate table ==
Pos	Team	Pld	W	D	L	GF	GA	GD	Pts	Qualification
1	Nacional	30	19	6	5	60	31	+29	63	2012 Copa Libertadores Second Stage and 2011 Copa Sudamericana Second Stage (Note: Nacional qualified for the 2011 Copa Sudamericana as the Primera División champion.) (Note: As Nacional defeated Defensor Sporting in the initial playoff and became champion, the final was not played, and Defensor Sporting became the runner-up as the 2nd best team in the aggregate table. Both Nacional and Defensor Sporting qualified for the 2012 Copa Libertadores group stage.)
2	Defensor Sporting	30	17	7	6	50	25	+25	58	2012 Copa Libertadores Second Stage
3	Peñarol	30	15	7	8	52	37	+15	52	2012 Copa Libertadores First Stage
4	Fénix	30	11	12	7	44	35	+9	45	2011 Copa Sudamericana First Stage
5	Bella Vista	30	12	8	10	40	36	+4	44	2011 Copa Sudamericana First Stage
6	Cerro	30	10	12	8	34	39	−5	42	
7	Montevideo Wanderers	30	10	11	9	44	33	+11	41	
8	Danubio	30	11	8	11	41	40	+1	41	
9	El Tanque Sisley	30	12	5	13	40	48	−8	41	
10	Central Español	30	10	10	10	47	42	+5	40	
11	Liverpool	30	10	10	10	40	39	+1	40	
12	Racing	30	10	8	12	40	43	−3	38	
13	River Plate	30	10	5	15	45	57	−12	35	
14	Rampla Juniors	30	7	10	13	38	52	−14	31	
15	Tacuarembó	30	7	3	20	27	58	−31	24	
16	Miramar Misiones	30	4	8	18	26	53	−27	20	

Rules for classification: 1st points; 2nd goal difference; 3rd goals scored; 4th head-to-head results; 5th draw.

=== Top goalscorers ===
Rank	Player	Nationality	Club	Goals
1	Santiago García	Uruguayan	Nacional	23
2	Cristian Palacios	Uruguayan	Peñarol/Central Español	16
3	Maximiliano Pérez	Argentine	Fénix	12
4	Diego Alonso	Uruguayan	Peñarol	11
4	Rodrigo Mora	Uruguayan	Defensor Sporting	11
6	Jean Pierre Barrientos	Uruguayan	Racing	9
6	Diego Perrone	Uruguayan	Danubio	9
6	Ignacio Risso	Uruguayan	Defensor Sporting	9
6	Federico Rodríguez	Uruguayan	Bella Vista	9
10	Nicolás Guevara	Argentine	Rampla Juniors/Liverpool	8
10	Federico Puppo	Uruguayan	River Plate	8
10	Liber Quiñones	Uruguayan	Racing	8

== Relegation ==
Pos	Team	Pld	W	D	L	GF	GA	GD	Pts	Relegation
1	Nacional	60	40	9	11	123	57	+66	126 (Note: Nacional was docked three points in the last season.)	
2	Peñarol	60	36	13	11	120	71	+49	121	
3	Defensor Sporting	60	30	14	16	99	69	+30	104	
4	Liverpool	60	24	19	17	93	74	+19	91	
5	Bella Vista	30	12	8	10	41	38	+3	88 (Note: Having only played one season in the Primera División, Bella Vista's, El Tanque Sisley's, and Miramar Misiones' points are doubled for the relegation table.)	
6	Montevideo Wanderers	60	21	19	20	93	72	+21	82	
7	Cerro	60	21	19	20	80	88	−8	82	
8	El Tanque Sisley	30	12	5	13	40	50	−10	82	
9	River Plate	60	22	15	23	100	99	+1	81	
10	Fénix	60	20	20	20	77	73	+4	80	
11	Danubio	60	23	11	26	88	90	−2	80	
12	Rampla Juniors	60	20	17	23	73	89	−16	77	
13	Racing	60	21	14	25	83	93	−10	77	
14	Central Español	60	18	20	22	84	90	−6	74	Relegated to the Segunda División Profesional
15	Tacuarembó	60	17	7	36	66	110	−44	58	Relegated to the Segunda División Profesional
16	Miramar Misiones	30	4	8	18	26	52	−26	40	Relegated to the Segunda División Profesional

Rules for classification: 1st points; 2nd goal difference; 3rd goals scored; 4th head-to-head results; 5th draw.

== Championship playoff ==
Defensor Sporting and Nacional qualified to the championship playoffs as the Apertura and Clausura winners, respectively. Additionally, Nacional re-qualified as the team with the most points in the season aggregate table. Given this situation, an initial playoff was held between the two teams. Nacional needed to win the playoff to become the season champion; Defensor Sporting needed to win the playoff to force a two-legged final. Nacional won the match 1–0 for their 43rd Primera División title.

Semi-final			Finals
			Aggregate table first place	Nacional	—	—	—
Apertura winners	Defensor Sporting	0		Nacional	—	—	—
Clausura winners	Nacional	1

=== Semi-final ===
June 12, 2011
16:00 UTC−03:00

Defensor Sporting	0–1	Nacional
	Report	Viudez 19'

Estadio Centenario, Montevideo
Attendance: 50,000
Referee: Darío Ubriaco

Defensor Sporting	Nacional

DEFENSOR SPORTING:
GK	1	(Uruguay) Martín Silva (c)
RB	8	(Uruguay) Damián Suárez
CB	4	(Uruguay) Mario Risso
CB	3	(Argentina) Nestor Moiraghi	(yellow card) 43'
LB	23	(Uruguay) Adrián Argachá
RM	14	(Paraguay) Eduardo Aranda
DM	15	(Uruguay) Diego Rodríguez	(yellow card) 48'
DM	6	(Uruguay) Sebastián Suárez		(substituted off) 58'
LM	10	(Uruguay) Brahian Alemán		(substituted off) 64'
CF	16	(Uruguay) Ignacio Risso		(substituted off) 69'
CF	11	(Uruguay) David Texeira
Substitutes:
GK	12	(Uruguay) Yonathan Irrazábal
DF	2	(Uruguay) Ramón Arias
MF	25	(Uruguay) Andrés Fleurquin
MF	21	(Uruguay) Ignacio Lores		(substituted on) 64'
MF	5	(Uruguay) Diego Ferreira
MF	20	(Uruguay) Adrián Luna	(red card) 89'	(substituted on) 58'
FW	18	(Uruguay) Mauro Vila		(substituted on) 69'
Manager:
Pablo Repetto

NACIONAL:
GK	25	(Uruguay) Rodrigo Muñoz
RB	13	(Brazil) Gabriel Marques	(yellow card) 39'
CB	2	(Uruguay) Alejandro Lembo (c)
CB	19	(Uruguay) Sebastián Coates
LB	4	(Uruguay) Alexis Rolín
DM	23	(Uruguay) Facundo Píriz	(yellow card) 73'
AM	8	(Uruguay) Matías Cabrera
AM	22	(Uruguay) Mauricio Pereyra
RW	15	(Uruguay) Tabaré Viudez		(substituted off) 83'
CF	20	(Uruguay) Santiago García		(substituted off) 46'
LW	24	(Uruguay) Richard Porta		(substituted off) 66'
Substitutes:
GK	1	(Uruguay) Leonardo Burián
DF	3	(Brazil) Jadson Viera
MF	5	(Brazil) Anderson Silva
MF	17	(Uruguay) Maximiliano Calzada
MF	10	(Argentina) Marcelo Gallardo		(substituted on) 66'
FW	6	(Uruguay) Nicolás Vigneri		(substituted on) 83'
FW	7	(Uruguay) Nicolás López		(substituted on) 46'
Manager:
Juan Ramón Carrasco

Man of the match:
(Uruguay) Mauricio Pereyra
Assistant referees:
William Casavieja
Raúl Hartwig
Fourth official:
Gustavo Siegler

Primera División
2010–11 champion

43rd title

== See also ==
- 2010–11 in Uruguayan football
