= 2012–13 Campeonato Uruguayo Primera División =

109th season of the top-tier football league in Uruguay

Liga Profesional de Primera División
- Season: 2012–13
- Champions: Peñarol (47th title)
- Relegated: Bella Vista; Progreso; Central Español
- 2014 Copa Libertadores: Peñarol; Defensor Sporting; Nacional
- 2013 Copa Sudamericana: Peñarol; River Plate; El Tanque Sisley; Montevideo Wanderers
- Matches: 240
- Goals: 629 (2.62 per match)
- Top goalscorer: Juan Manuel Olivera (18 goals)
- Biggest home win: Nacional 2–0 Cerro Largo (September 9, 2012); Defensor Sporting 2–0 Liverpool (September 15, 2012); Cerro 2–0 Juventud
- Biggest away win: Montevideo Wanderers 0–4 Defensor Sporting (September 1, 2012)
- Highest scoring: Fénix 4–3 Peñarol (August 26, 2012)
- Longest winning run: 2 games: Defensor Sporting; Fénix; Nacional; Progreso
- Longest unbeaten run: 3 games: Defensor Sporting; El Tanque Sisley; Liverpool; Nacional; Progreso
- Longest winless run: 3 games: Central Español; Cerro Largo; Danubio; Racing
- Longest losing run: 3 games: Central Español

The 2012–13 Liga Profesional de Primera División season, also known as the 2012–13 Copa Uruguaya or the 2012–13 Campeonato Uruguayo, was the 109th season of Uruguay's top-flight football league, and the 82nd in which it was professional. Nacional was the defending champion.

== Teams ==
Sixteen teams will compete in the Primera División this season. Thirteen teams remained from the 2011–12 season. Rentistas, Rampla Juniors, and Cerrito were relegated after accumulating the fewest points in the relegation table. They were replaced by Central Español, Juventud, and Progreso, the 2011–12 Segunda División winner, runner-up, and playoff winner, respectively. All of the new teams are making repeat appearances.

Locations of the 2012–13 season teams outside Montevideo.
Locations of the 2012−13 Primera División teams within Montevideo.

Club	City	Stadium	Capacity
Bella Vista	Montevideo	José Nasazzi	15,000
Central Español	Montevideo	Parque Palermo	6,500
Cerro	Montevideo	Luis Tróccoli	24,000
Cerro Largo	Melo	Arquitecto Antonio Eleuterio Ubilla	9,000
Danubio	Montevideo	Jardines Del Hipódromo	14,401
Defensor Sporting	Montevideo	Luis Franzini	9,357
El Tanque Sisley	Montevideo	Dr. Victor Della Valle	4,500
Fénix	Montevideo	Parque Capurro	5,500
Juventud	Las Piedras	Parque Artigas	12,000
Liverpool	Montevideo	Belvedere	8,384
Montevideo Wanderers	Montevideo	Parque Alfredo Víctor Viera	7,420
Nacional	Montevideo	Gran Parque Central	23,500
Peñarol	Montevideo	-	-
Progreso	Montevideo	Parque Abraham Paladino	5,400
Racing	Montevideo	Osvaldo Roberto	8,500
River Plate	Montevideo	Parque Federico Omar Saroldi	5,624

=== Managerial changes ===
Team	Outgoing manager	Manner of departure	Date of vacancy	Replaced by	Date of appointment	Position in table
Pre-season changes
Bella Vista	Diego Alonso	End of Contract	June 8, 2012	Guillermo Sanguinetti	June 16, 2012	N/A
Nacional	Marcelo Gallardo	End of contract	June 18, 2012	Gustavo Díaz	June 28, 2012	N/A
Fénix	Lorenzo Carrabs (interim)	Sacked	June 21, 2012	Eduardo Favaro	July 9, 2012	N/A
Defensor Sporting	Gustavo Díaz	Signed by Nacional	June 23, 2012	Tabaré Silva	June 27, 2012	N/A
Cerro	Gabriel Camacho (interim)	Sacked	July 6, 2012	Ricardo Ortíz	July 6, 2012	N/A
Season changes
Danubio	Daniel Sánchez	Sacked	September 5, 2012	Juan Ramón Carrasco	September 17, 2012	15th

== Torneo Apertura ==
=== Standings ===
Pos	Team	Pld	W	D	L	GF	GA	GD	Pts	Qualification
1	Peñarol	15	11	3	1	35	13	+22	36	Championship Playoffs
2	Defensor Sporting	15	9	5	1	31	11	+20	32	
3	Nacional	15	10	2	3	29	14	+15	32	
4	El Tanque Sisley	15	8	6	1	23	17	+6	30	
5	River Plate	15	5	6	4	21	17	+4	21	
6	Fénix	15	6	3	6	24	24	0	21	
7	Bella Vista	15	6	2	7	13	17	−4	20	
8	Montevideo Wanderers	15	5	4	6	22	24	−2	19	
9	Juventud	15	5	4	6	13	17	−4	19	
10	Cerro	15	5	3	7	14	17	−3	18	
11	Central Español	15	4	4	7	11	19	−8	16	
12	Liverpool	15	4	3	8	21	28	−7	15	
13	Progreso	15	4	3	8	17	28	−11	15	
14	Racing	15	3	4	8	17	27	−10	13	
15	Cerro Largo	15	2	6	7	14	20	−6	12	
16	Danubio	15	1	6	8	15	27	−12	9	

=== Results ===
Home \ Away	BVI	CES	CRR	CRL	DAN	DFS	ETS	FNX	JUV	LIV	WAN	NAC	PEÑ	PRO	RAC	RIV
Bella Vista		0–1	1–0	0–1	2–1			0–0				1–2	0–2	3–1		
Central Español					1–0	1–1	1–2			0–2		0–2			1–1	2–5
Cerro	2–0	0–2		2–2				1–2	2–0		0–0	1–0		0–2		
Cerro Largo		0–0			1–1	0–1	1–1	2–0			2–3		2–4	1–1		2–2
Danubio			1–1				1–2	2–1		2–2	2–4		0–0	1–4		0–2
Defensor Sporting	4–0		2–0	1–0	3–1				1–1	2–0		2–2			1–0	
El Tanque Sisley	1–1		2–1			1–1				2–2		3–2		2–2		1–0
Fénix		1–2			1–1	1–3	0–2		1–1		4–1		4–3			2–2
Juventud	2–0	1–0		1–0	0–0		0–2			2–1			1–5		0–1	
Liverpool	0–2		1–0	1–0				2–3			2–3			3–1	4–4	
Montevideo Wanderers	0–1	0–0				0–4	1–1		3–3				1–2		3–0	1–3
Nacional				2–0	2–1			2–1	3–1	3–1	1–0			6–1		0–2
Peñarol		3–0	2–1			2–1	4–0		2–0	2–0		0–0				1–1
Progreso		1–0				1–4		2–0	0–1		1–0		1–3		1–2	
Racing	0–1		1–2	1–0	2–2		0–1	1–2		0–0		0–2	2–5			
River Plate	0–2	5–0	0–1			1–1			1–0	2–0				0–0	2–2	

Updated to match(es) played on September 16, 2012.. Source:
Legend: Blue = home team win; Yellow = draw; Red = away team win.

=== Top goalscorers ===
Rank	Player	Club	Goals
1	(Uruguay) Juan Manuel Olivera	Peñarol	13
2	(Uruguay) Héctor Acuña	El Tanque Sisley	11
3	(Uruguay) Mauro Guevgeozian	Fénix	10
4	(Uruguay) Maximiliano Rodríguez Maeso	Wanderers	9
5	(Uruguay) Diego Rolán	Defensor Sporting	8

Updated as of games played on September 9, 2012.

== Torneo Clausura ==
=== Standings ===
Pos	Team	Pld	W	D	L	GF	GA	GD	Pts	Qualification
1	Defensor Sporting	15	9	4	2	19	9	+10	31	Championship Playoffs
2	Peñarol	15	9	3	3	26	8	+18	30	
3	River Plate	15	9	3	3	27	14	+13	30	
4	Nacional	15	7	5	3	23	21	+2	26	
5	Danubio	15	8	2	5	18	16	+2	26	
6	Racing	15	6	6	3	17	13	+4	24	
7	Montevideo Wanderers	15	6	3	6	19	14	+5	21	
8	Juventud	15	6	3	6	27	32	−5	21	
9	Fénix	15	5	4	6	18	18	0	19	
10	El Tanque Sisley	15	4	6	5	16	17	−1	18	
11	Cerro	15	4	5	6	19	24	−5	17	
12	Liverpool	15	3	7	5	19	23	−4	16	
13	Cerro Largo	15	4	3	8	17	20	−3	15	
14	Progreso	15	4	1	10	15	28	−13	13	
15	Central Español	15	3	3	9	13	25	−12	12	
16	Bella Vista	15	2	4	9	16	27	−11	10	

=== Results ===
Home \ Away	BVI	CES	CRR	CRL	DAN	DFS	ETS	FNX	JUV	LIV	WAN	NAC	PEÑ	PRO	RAC	RIV
Bella Vista						0–0	0–1		5–2	3–3	0–2	3–4			0–1	0–1
Central Español	1–1		0–2	0–0				2–3	1–2		0–1		1–3	1–0		
Cerro					3–1	1–1	2–2			1–0			1–1		1–1	1–2
Cerro Largo	3–0		3–1						2–3	1–1		1–1			3–1	
Danubio	4–1	0–2		1–0		0–2			2–1			0–1			3–2	
Defensor Sporting		2–1					3–0	2–0			1–0		1–0	0–1		2–2
El Tanque Sisley		3–1		1–0	0–1			2–0	4–4		0–0		0–1		0–0	
Fénix	1–0		3–0	3–1	1–1					1–1		2–2			0–1	
Juventud			4–1			0–1		1–0			1–1	2–0		4–2		0–4
Liverpool		1–1			0–1	4–2	1–1		2–2			0–2	0–4			4–2
Montevideo Wanderers			1–2	2–1	1–2			2–1		2–0		1–2		4–0		0–1
Nacional		2–1	2–2			0–1	1–1						0–3		1–1	
Peñarol	2–0			2–0	0–1			1–1			0–0			1–0	1–2	
Progreso	2–2		2–1	1–2	1–0		2–1	1–2		0–2		2–3				1–3
Racing		0–1				0–0			2–0	0–0	3–2			2–0		1–1
River Plate		5–0		2–0	1–1		1–0	1–0				1–2	0–2			

Updated to match(es) played on 2012. Source:
Legend: Blue = home team win; Yellow = draw; Red = away team win.

== Aggregate table ==
Pos	Team	Pld	W	D	L	GF	GA	GD	Pts	Qualification
1	Peñarol	30	20	6	4	61	21	+40	66	2014 Copa Libertadores Second Stage and 2013 Copa Sudamericana First Stage (Note: Peñarol qualified for the 2014 Copa Libertadores and 2013 Copa Sudamericana as the league champion.)
2	Defensor Sporting	30	18	9	3	50	20	+30	63	2014 Copa Libertadores Second Stage
3	Nacional	30	17	7	6	52	35	+17	58	2014 Copa Libertadores First Stage
4	River Plate	30	14	9	7	48	31	+17	51	2013 Copa Sudamericana First Stage
5	El Tanque Sisley	30	12	12	6	39	34	+5	48	2013 Copa Sudamericana First Stage
6	Montevideo Wanderers	30	11	7	12	41	38	+3	40	2013 Copa Sudamericana First Stage
7	Fénix	30	11	7	12	42	42	0	40	
8	Juventud	30	11	7	12	40	49	−9	40	
9	Racing	30	9	10	11	34	40	−6	37	
10	Cerro	30	9	8	13	33	41	−8	35	
11	Danubio	30	9	8	13	33	43	−10	35	
12	Liverpool	30	7	10	13	40	51	−11	31	
13	Bella Vista	30	8	6	16	29	44	−15	30	
14	Central Español	30	7	7	16	24	44	−20	28	
15	Progreso	30	8	4	18	32	56	−24	28	
16	Cerro Largo	30	6	9	15	31	40	−9	27	

== Relegation ==
Pos	Team	Pld	W	D	L	GF	GA	GD	Pts	Relegation
1	Peñarol	58	37	11	10	123	50	+73	122	
2	Defensor Sporting	58	36	13	9	102	46	+56	121	
3	Nacional	58	35	14	9	115	63	+52	119	
4	River Plate	58	26	17	15	92	71	+21	95	
5	Montevideo Wanderers	58	24	11	23	89	86	+3	83	
6	Liverpool	58	24	11	23	88	86	+2	83	
7	Danubio	58	21	18	19	68	68	0	83 (Note: Danubio won the points of the match against Racing because Racing fielded an ineligible player (Marcelo Sosa).)	
8	Cerro Largo	58	22	15	21	77	72	+5	81	
9	Juventud	28	11	6	11	35	40	−5	78 (Note: Having only played one season in the Primera División, Central Español's, Juventud's, and Progreso's points are doubled for the relegation table.)	
10	El Tanque Sisley	58	21	14	23	64	78	−14	77	
11	Cerro	58	19	13	26	67	76	−9	70	
12	Racing	58	17	17	24	73	93	−20	67	
13	Fénix	58	17	15	26	74	86	−12	66	
14	Progreso	28	8	4	16	30	51	−21	56	Relegation to the 2013–14 Segunda División
15	Bella Vista	58	16	8	34	56	89	−33	56	Relegation to the 2013–14 Segunda División
16	Central Español	28	7	6	15	23	38	−15	54	Relegation to the 2013–14 Segunda División

Rules for classification: 1) points; 2) goal difference; 3) number of goals scored.

== Championship playoff ==
Peñarol and Defensor Sporting qualified to the championship playoffs as the Apertura and Clausura winners, respectively. Additionally, Peñarol re-qualified as the team with the most points in the season aggregate table. Given this situation, an initial playoff was held between the two teams. Peñarol would become the season champion with a win; Defensor Sporting needed to win the playoff to force a two-legged final.

June 4, 2013
21:00

Defensor Sporting	1–3	Peñarol
Luna 90'	Report	Pacheco 26', 36' (pen.), 80'

Estadio Centenario, Montevideo
Attendance: 58,000
Referee: Martín Vázquez

Primera División
2012–13 champion

42nd title
