= Gastón Giménez (footballer, born 1989) =

Uruguayan footballer

Personal information
- Full name: Diego Gastón Giménez Díaz
- Date of birth: 7 December 1989 (age 36)
- Place of birth: Treinta y Tres, Uruguay
- Height: 1.84 m (6 ft 1/2 in)
- Position: Forward

Youth career
- Danubio

Senior career*
Years	Team	Apps	(Gls)
2010–2013	Danubio	9	(2)
2011–2012	→ Rentistas (loan)	19	(2)
2012–2013	→ Rocha (loan)	14	(1)
- * Club domestic league appearances and goals as of 13:35, 15 February 2018 (UTC)

Diego Gastón Giménez Díaz (born 7 December 1989) is a Uruguayan footballer who plays as a forward. He is currently a free agent.

== Career ==
Giménez began his career with Danubio of the Uruguayan Primera División. He scored on his professional debut in a win against Miramar Misiones on 4 September 2010. Another goal followed on 7 November versus Tacuarembó, in a season which included nine appearances. On 12 July 2011, Giménez was loaned to fellow top-flight team Rentistas. During his second start, on 4 September 2011 against Cerro, Giménez scored his third career goal. One goal in eighteen further appearances arrived with the club. In August 2012, Giménez joined Uruguayan Segunda División side Rocha on loan. He went on to score once in fourteen games.

== Career statistics ==
As of 15 February 2018.

Club statistics
Club	Season	League			Cup		League Cup		Continental (Note: Includes the Copa Sudamericana)		Other		Total	
Club	Season	Division	Apps	Goals	Apps	Goals	Apps	Goals	Apps	Goals	Apps	Goals	Apps	Goals
Danubio	2010–11	Primera División	9	2	—		—		—		0	0	9	2
Danubio	2011–12	Primera División	0	0	—		—		—		0	0	0	0
Danubio	2012–13	Primera División	0	0	—		—		0	0	0	0	0	0
Danubio	Total		9	2	—		—		0	0	0	0	9	2
Rentistas (loan)	2011–12	Primera División	19	2	—		—		—		0	0	19	2
Rocha (loan)	2012–13	Segunda División	14	1	—		—		—		0	0	14	1
Career total			42	5	—		—		0	0	0	0	42	5
