= Nuevo Estadio Belvedere =

Football stadium in Uruguay

New Belvedere Stadium
- Nuevo Estadio Belvedere
- Location: Montevideo, Uruguay
- Owner: Liverpool F.C.
- Capacity: 15.000 - 20.000

Construction
- Groundbreaking: 2026
- Opened: 2028

Tenants
- Liverpool F.C. (Planned)

The New Belvedere Stadium is a project currently under construction to serve as the new stadium for Liverpool Fútbol Club. It will be located in the Belvedere neighborhood of Montevideo, replacing the old Belvedere Stadium, which was demolished in May 2026 to make way for the construction work.

It will have a capacity of between 15,000 and 20,000 people, two tiers, covered stands, amenities and shops, and a restaurant, among other spaces. Construction is estimated to take between 18 and 20 months and will be financed using the institution's own funds. Construction officially began on August 15, 2026, with the laying of the foundation stone during a ceremony attended by the President of the Republic, Yamandú Orsi.

The inauguration is scheduled for February or March 2028.
