= Leandro Sosa =

Leandro Sosa may refer to:

- Leandro Sosa (footballer, born 1994), Uruguayan footballer for O'Higgins
- Leandro Sosa (footballer, born 1991), Uruguayan footballer for Aldosivi
