= Leandro Sosa (footballer, born 1991) =

Uruguayan footballer

Personal information
- Full name: Luis Leandro Sosa Otermin
- Date of birth: 18 March 1991 (age 35)
- Place of birth: Montevideo, Uruguay
- Height: 1.77 m (5 ft 9 1/2 in)
- Position: Left-back

Team information
- Current team: Danubio
- Number: 6

Youth career
- 2005–2011: Danubio

Senior career*
Years	Team	Apps	(Gls)
2011–2016	Danubio	67	(4)
2016–2017	Aldosivi	25	(1)
2017–	Danubio	220	(5)
2019–2020	→ Xanthi (loan)	25	(0)
- * Club domestic league appearances and goals as of 1 October 2025

Luis Leandro Sosa Otermin (born 18 March 1991) is a Uruguayan professional footballer who plays as a left-back for Danubio.

== Career ==
Sosa's club career started in 2011 with Uruguayan Primera División side Danubio after he was promoted from the club's youth system. He made his Danubio debut on 10 September in a 1–1 draw versus Nacional. From his debut in 2011–12 to the end of the 2012–13 season, he had played in fifteen league games for Danubio. In the following season, 2013–14, he participated in twelve Primera División matches for Danubio as the club won the title; he also scored two goals in 2013–14, including a goal in the championship playoff final against Montevideo Wanderers. In August 2014, Sosa made his Copa Sudamericana debut in a loss to Deportivo Capiatá.

Fifty-two appearances and four goals followed in all competitions for Sosa in 2014–15 and 2015–16. On 8 July 2016, Sosa left Danubio and joined Argentine Primera División club Aldosivi. He made his Aldosivi debut on 25 September versus Lanús. Twenty-five appearances followed, prior to Sosa rejoining Danubio in August 2017. His 100th career league appearance arrived on 3 December versus Boston River. On 9 July 2019, Danubio announced Sosa was set to depart for Greek football on loan. Xanthi, of Super League Greece, were revealed as his next team on 13 July.

== Career statistics ==
As of 8 August 2020.

Club statistics
Club	Season	League			Cup		Continental		Other		Total	
Club	Season	Division	Apps	Goals	Apps	Goals	Apps	Goals	Apps	Goals	Apps	Goals
Danubio	2011–12	Uruguayan Primera División	6	0	—		0	0	0	0	6	0
Danubio	2012–13	Uruguayan Primera División	9	0	—		0	0	0	0	9	0
Danubio	2013–14	Uruguayan Primera División	10	1	—		0	0	2 (Note: Appearance(s) in the Uruguayan Primera División play-offs)	1	12	2
Danubio	2014–15	Uruguayan Primera División	20	1	—		8 (Note: Appearance(s) in the Copa Libertadores and Copa Sudamericana)	1	0	0	28	2
Danubio	2015–16	Uruguayan Primera División	22	2	—		2 (Note: Appearance(s) in the Copa Sudamericana)	0	0	0	24	2
Danubio	Total		67	4	—		10	1	2	1	79	6
Aldosivi	2016–17	Argentine Primera División	25	1	1	0	—		0	0	26	1
Danubio	2017	Uruguayan Primera División	8	0	—		—		0	0	8	0
Danubio	2018	Uruguayan Primera División	34	1	—		2	1	0	0	36	2
Danubio	2019	Uruguayan Primera División	13	0	—		0	0	0	0	13	0
Danubio	Total		55	1	—		2	1	0	0	57	2
Xanthi (loan)	2019–20	Super League Greece	25	0	3	0	—		0	0	28	0
Career total			172	6	4	0	12	2	2	1	190	9

== Honours ==
Danubio

- Uruguayan Primera División: 2013–14
