= Pablo Tiscornia =

Uruguayan footballer and manager (born 1974)

Personal information
- Full name: José Pablo Tiscornia Baptista
- Date of birth: 15 February 1974 (age 52)
- Place of birth: Montevideo, Uruguay
- Height: 1.90 m (6 ft 3 in)
- Position: Defender

Team information
- Current team: River Plate (Caretaker)

Senior career*
Years	Team	Apps	(Gls)
1993–1999	River Plate		
1999–2000	USAC		
2000–2001	Herediano		
2001–2004	A.D. Santa Barbara		
2004–2006	Cartaginés		
2006–2007	Luis Ángel Firpo		
2007–2009	River Plate	43	(0)
2009–2010	Cerro Largo	28	(0)
2011	Rentistas	10	(0)
2011–2012	Juventud	18	(0)

Managerial career
- 2016: River Plate (caretaker)
- 2017–2018: River Plate
- 2019: Tacuarembó
- 2019–2021: Juventud
- 2021-: River Plate (caretaker)
- * Club domestic league appearances and goals

José Pablo Tiscornia Baptista (born 15 February 1974, in Montevideo) is a Uruguayan manager and former footballer. He is currently assistant manager of River Plate.

== Club career ==
Born in Montevideo, Tiscornia began playing football with local side River Plate where he made his debut in the Primera División Uruguaya in 1999.

== Coaching career ==
After working as a youth coach for some years for River Plate, he was promoted to manager of the first team on 28 September 2016 until the end of the year, after the dismissal of Juan Ramón Carrasco. From the new year, he returned to coaching the youth sector but in March 2017, he was appointed manager of the first team once again. He left the club on 28 August 2018.

On 30 January 2019, he was appointed manager of Tacuarembó. He left the position at the end of May 2019.

On 3 September 2019, Tiscornia returned to Juventud as the club's new manager.
