= Gastón Giménez =

Gastón Giménez may refer to:

- Gastón Giménez (footballer, born 1989), Uruguayan footballer
- Gastón Giménez (footballer, born 1991), Argentine-Paraguan footballer
