= Sebastián Suárez =

Sebastián Suárez may refer to:

- Sebastián Suárez (basketball) (born 1991), Chilean basketball player
- Sebastián Suárez (footballer) (born 1978), Uruguayan footballer
- Sebastian Suarez (Humanitarian) (born 1996) California
