= Diego Martiñones =

Uruguayan footballer (born 1985)

Personal information
- Full name: Diego Andrés Martiñones Rus
- Date of birth: 25 January 1985 (age 41)
- Place of birth: Montevideo, Uruguay
- Height: 1.75 m (5 ft 9 in)
- Position: Forward

Senior career*
Years	Team	Apps	(Gls)
2005–2008	Danubio	7	(0)
2008	Tacuarembó	10	(3)
2009	Cobresal	12	(3)
2010	Central Español	15	(7)
2011	Blooming	14	(2)
2012	Danubio	14	(10)
2012–2013	Estudiantes Tecos	26	(8)
2013	San Martín SJ	10	(0)
2014	Danubio	15	(3)
2014	Talleres de Córdoba	8	(1)
2015	Racing de Montevideo	13	(2)
2015–2016	Villa Teresa	14	(2)
2016	Liverpool Montevideo	3	(0)
2016–2018	Torque	36	(17)
2018	Rampla Juniors	26	(11)
2019	Gimnasia Jujuy	7	(1)
2019–2020	Danubio	12	(4)
2020–2021	Rampla Juniors	26	(6)
2021	La Luz		
- * Club domestic league appearances and goals

Diego Andrés Martiñones Rus (Note: In this Spanish name, the first or paternal surname is Martiñones and the second or maternal family name is Rus.) (born 25 January 1985), known as Diego Martiñones, is a Uruguayan former footballer who played as a forward.

== Career ==
In 2005 Martiñones began his professional career with Danubio F.C. During the 2008 season he transferred to Tacuarembó F.C. where he remained until the end of that season. The following year, he signed for Chilean club Cobresal, but returned to Uruguay a year after to join Central Español where he showed good form.

For the 2011 season he travelled abroad again, this time he signed with Bolivian team Blooming.

In January 2012, he returned to his home land, playing again for Danubio F.C. During the Clausura 2012 he scored 10 goals in 14 matches, calling the attention of many clubs from Argentina and Mexico you wanted to hire him.

As a result of his good performances at his return to Danubio, he was transferred to Mexican side Estudiantes Tecos in July 2012.
