= Felipe Barrenechea =

Lithuanian footballer (born 2007)

Personal information
- Full name: Felipe Barrenechea Acuña
- Date of birth: 23 June 2007 (age 19)
- Place of birth: Uruguay
- Height: 1.77 m (5 ft 10 in)
- Positions: Winger; forward

Team information
- Current team: Liverpool
- Number: 32

Youth career
- –2025: Peñarol

Senior career*
Years	Team	Apps	(Gls)
2026–	Liverpool	2	(0)

International career^{‡}
2025–	Lithuania U19	2	(0)
- * Club domestic league appearances and goals as of 24 March 2026 ‡ National team caps and goals as of 18 November 2025

Felipe Barrenechea Acuña (born 23 March 2007) is a professional footballer who plays as a winger or forward for Liverpool. Born in Uruguay, he is a Lithuania youth international.

== Club career ==
As a youth player, Barrenechea joined the youth academy of Uruguayan side Peñarol at the age of nine. Following his stint there, he signed for Uruguayan side Liverpool ahead of the 2026 season.

== International career ==
Barrenechea is a Lithuania youth international. During the autumn of 2025, he was called up to the Lithuania national under-19 football team for 2026 UEFA European Under-19 Championship qualification.
