= Maximiliano Callorda =

Uruguayan footballer (born 1990)

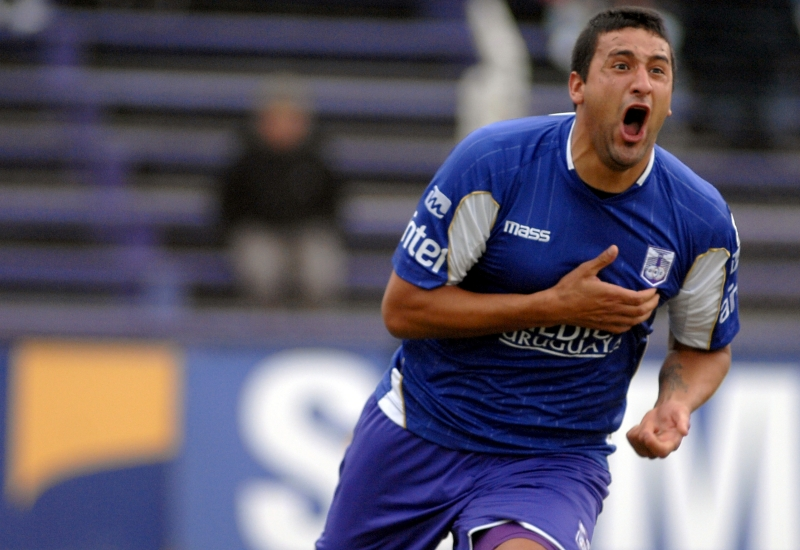

Personal information
- Full name: Maximiliano Callorda Lafont
- Date of birth: 4 April 1990 (age 36)
- Place of birth: Trinidad, Uruguay
- Position: Forward

Senior career*
Years	Team	Apps	(Gls)
2009-2010	Sud América		
2010-2011	El Tanque Sisley	16	(6)
2011-2014	Defensor Sporting	21	(6)
2014	C.A. Fénix	12	(4)
2014-2015	C.S.D. Municipal	46	(11)
2015-2016	El Tanque Sisley	24	(6)
2016	S.D. Aucas	17	(0)
2017	Universidad Técnica de Cajamarca	36	(3)
2018	Boston River	13	(2)
2018-2019	Real C.D. España	7	(2)
2019	C.A. Rentistas	23	(11)
2020	Ayacucho FC	17	(2)
2021–	Albion Football Club	53	(9)
- * Club domestic league appearances and goals

Maximiliano Callorda Lafont (born 4 April 1990 in Uruguay) is a Uruguayan footballer.

== Career ==
While playing for Defensor Sporting, Callorda broke his cruciate ligaments, which affected his ability.

In 2014, Callorda signed for C.S.D. Municipal in Guatemala, where he claimed that the infrastructure was better than in Uruguay.

In 2018, he signed for Honduran side Real C.D. España. However, Callorda was under immense pressure due to being a foreign player and was criticized despite scoring two goals in his first two games. He was also accused of being overweight.
