= Damián Frascarelli =

Uruguayan footballer (born 1985)

Personal information
- Full name: Damián Andrés Frascarelli Gutiérrez
- Date of birth: 2 June 1985 (age 41)
- Place of birth: Montevideo, Uruguay
- Height: 1.89 m (6 ft 2 in)
- Position: Goalkeeper

Team information
- Current team: Aucas
- Number: 25

Senior career*
Years	Team	Apps	(Gls)
2006–2008	Miramar Misiones	0	(0)
2008–2009	Peñarol	0	(0)
2009	Central Español	15	(0)
2010	C.A. Cerro	13	(0)
2010–2011	APOP Kinyras Peyias	15	(0)
2011	AC Omonia	0	(0)
2012	Bella Vista	10	(0)
2012–2014	River Plate Montevideo	59	(0)
2014–2015	Ñublense	34	(0)
2015–2017	Peñarol	1	(0)
2017–2019	Guayaquil City	64	(1)
2019	→ Barcelona SC (loan)	11	(0)
2020–	Aucas	4	(0)
- * Club domestic league appearances and goals as of 09:11, 6 July 2020 (UTC)

Damián Andrés Frascarelli Gutiérrez (Note: In this Spanish name, the first or paternal surname is Frascarelli and the second or maternal family name is Gutiérrez.) (born 2 June 1985), known as Damián Frascarelli, is a Uruguayan professional goalkeeper who plays for S.D. Aucas, on loan from Guayaquil City.
