= Mariano Cappi =

Uruguayan footballer (born 1991)

Personal information
- Full name: Mariano Cappi González
- Date of birth: 15 October 1991 (age 35)
- Place of birth: Montevideo, Uruguay
- Height: 1.75 m (5 ft 9 in)
- Position: Defender

Team information
- Current team: El Tanque Sisley

Youth career
- 2007–2011: Central Español

Senior career*
Years	Team	Apps	(Gls)
2011–2012	Portimonense	1	(0)
2012–2013	Rentistas	1	(0)
2013–2015	Cerrito		
2016	Atlético Pantoja	?	(?)
2016–2020	El Tanque Sisley	4	(0)
- * Club domestic league appearances and goals as of 2 January 2018

Mariano Cappi González (born October 15, 1991 in Montevideo), commonly known as Mariano Cappi, is a Uruguayan footballer who plays as a defender for El Tanque Sisley.
