= Daniel Sánchez (Uruguayan footballer) =

Uruguayan footballer and manager (born 1961)

Personal information
- Full name: Daniel Florencio Sánchez Núñez
- Date of birth: May 3, 1961 (age 65)
- Place of birth: Montevideo, Uruguay
- Height: 1.81 m (5 ft 11 1/2 in)
- Position: Defender

Senior career*
Years	Team	Apps	(Gls)
1981–1983	River Plate Montevideo		
1984	Liverpool de Montevideo		
1985	Rampla Juniors		
1986	Central Español		
1987–1989	Danubio		
1990	C.A. Peñarol		
1991–1993	Danubio		

International career
1988–1993	Uruguay	25	(0)

Managerial career
- 2010: Central Español
- 2011–2012: Danubio
- 2014: Miramar Misiones
- 2013–: Liga Universitaria (LUD)
- * Club domestic league appearances and goals as of 7 July 2015

Daniel Florencio Sánchez Núñez (born May 3, 1961, in Montevideo), best known as Daniel Sánchez, is a retired football (soccer) defender and current manager who was nicknamed "Pecho" during his professional career. Having made his debut on September 27, 1988 against Ecuador (2-1), Sánchez obtained a total number of 25 international caps for the Uruguay national football team.
