= Antoine Helha =

Cameroonian footballer

Personal information
- Full name: Antoine Paulin Helha Nouga
- Date of birth: November 19, 1982 (age 43)
- Place of birth: Douala, Cameroon
- Height: 1.86 m (6 ft 1 in)
- Positions: Striker; forward

Senior career*
Years	Team	Apps	(Gls)
2002–2005	Fovu Baham		
2005	Plaza Colonia		
2006	Bella Vista		
2007	Boston River		
2008–2009	El Tanque Sisley		
2009	Coquimbo Unido		
2010–2011	El Tanque Sisley		
2011–2012	Cerrito		
- * Club domestic league appearances and goals

Antoine Helha (born November 19, 1982, in Douala) is a Cameroonian footballer currently playing as a striker for Cerrito in the Uruguayan Primera División.

== Teams ==
- (Cameroon) Fovu Baham 2002-2005
- (Uruguay) Plaza Colonia 2005
- (Uruguay) Bella Vista 2006
- (Uruguay) Boston River 2007
- (Uruguay) El Tanque Sisley 2008-2009
- (Chile) Coquimbo Unido 2009
- (Uruguay) El Tanque Sisley 2010-2011
- (Uruguay) Cerrito 2011–present
