= Jorge Giordano =

Uruguayan football manager (born 1965)

Personal information
- Full name: Jorge Antonio Giordano Moreno
- Date of birth: 27 February 1965 (age 61)
- Place of birth: Florida, Uruguay
- Position: Midfielder

Youth career
- San Remo

Senior career*
Years	Team	Apps	(Gls)
1980–1990	Atlético Florida		
1990	Liverpool Montevideo		
1990–1995	Villa Española		
1995	Atlético Florida		

Managerial career
- 1995–1998: Atlético Florida
- 2002: Guabirá (assistant)
- 2002–2003: Villa Española (assistant)
- 2004–2005: Plaza Colonia (assistant)
- 2005: Rampla Juniors (assistant)
- 2006–2007: Danubio (assistant)
- 2007: Peñarol (assistant)
- 2008–2009: Fénix
- 2009–2010: Danubio
- 2010–2011: Rampla Juniors
- 2011: Colegio Nacional Iquitos
- 2012: Racing Montevideo
- 2013–2017: Juventud de Las Piedras
- 2016–2017: Montevideo Wanderers
- 2018–2019: River Plate Montevideo
- 2020: Nacional (interim)
- 2021: Nacional
- * Club domestic league appearances and goals

Jorge Antonio Giordano Moreno (born 27 February 1965) is a Uruguayan football manager and former player who played as a midfielder.

== Career ==
In June 2019, Giordano was hires as technical secretary of Nacional.

== Honours ==
Fénix

- Uruguayan Segunda División: 2008–09
