= Sebastián Gaitán =

Uruguayan footballer (born 1987)

Personal information
- Full name: Sebastián Rodrigo Gaitán Araújo
- Date of birth: 21 June 1987 (age 39)
- Place of birth: Montevideo, Uruguay
- Height: 1.74 m (5 ft 9 in)
- Position: Attacking midfielder

Senior career*
Years	Team	Apps	(Gls)
2007–2010	Progreso	?	(9)
2010–2011	El Tanque	21	(6)
2011–2013	Progreso	35	(9)
2013	Deportivo Petapa	6	(0)
2013–2014	Villa Teresa	36	(9)
- * Club domestic league appearances and goals

Sebastián Rodrigo Gaitán Araújo (born 21 June 1987) is a Uruguayan former footballer who played as an attacking midfielder.
