= Pablo Olivera =

Uruguayan footballer (born 1987)

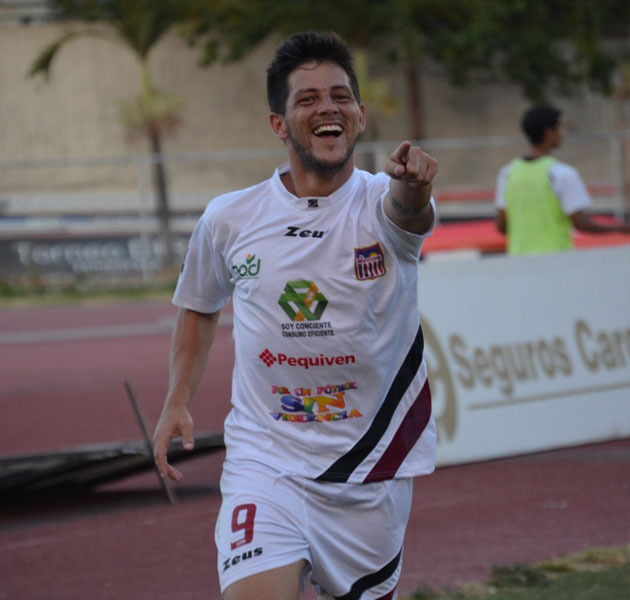

Personal information
- Full name: Pablo Fernando Olivera Fernández
- Date of birth: 8 December 1987 (age 38)
- Place of birth: Melo, Uruguay
- Height: 1.73 m (5 ft 8 in)
- Position: Forward

Team information
- Current team: Sud América
- Number: 21

Senior career*
Years	Team	Apps	(Gls)
2005–2009	Cerro Largo	?	(11)
2007–2008	→ Rampla Juniors (loan)		
2009– 2010	River Plate	47	(16)
2010	→ Cerro Largo (loan)	13	(3)
2012–2013	→ Moreirense (loan)	16	(3)
2013–2014	→ Carabobo (loan)	36	(17)
2014	Central Español	13	(1)
2015–2016	Deportivo Tachira	3	(1)
2016–2017	Al-Wakra	15	(2)
2017	Fénix	3	(0)
2017–2018	Atlético San Luis	24	(6)
2018–2019	Torque	14	(3)
2019	Cerro	10	(2)
2019	Juventud	10	(0)
2020–	Sud América	18	(6)
- * Club domestic league appearances and goals as of 20:51, 30 November 2020 (UTC)

Pablo Fernando Olivera Fernández (born 8 December 1987) is an Uruguayan professional footballer who currently plays as a forward for Sud América.

== Club career ==
Olivera started his senior career playing with his hometown club Cerro Largo FC in 2005.

In mid-2007, he was loaned to Rampla Juniors for a year.

In August 2009, he signed a new deal with River Plate, team where he contributed with 16 goals in 47 matches. On 1 September 2010 he made his first international appearance playing the Copa Sudamericana against Paraguayan club Guaraní.

On 8 August 2012, Olivera joined Liga ZON Sagres side Moreirense F.C. for a year loan transfer. He made his debut on 19 August in a 1–1 draw against Paços de Ferreira, coming on a substitute for Pintassilgo. He scored his two first goals on 21 October in a 3–2 win Taça de Portugal match against Sporting Clube. He scored his first Primeira Liga goal on 27 October in a 2–2 draw against Olhanense.
