= Mathías Bernatene =

Uruguayan footballer (born 2000)

Personal information
- Full name: Mathías Nicolás Bernatene Carle
- Date of birth: 24 July 2000 (age 26)
- Place of birth: Dolores, Uruguay
- Height: 1.86 m (6 ft 1 in)
- Position: Goalkeeper

Team information
- Current team: Liverpool Montevideo

Youth career
- 2016: Bella Vista Dolores
- 2017–2019: Albion
- 2018–2019: → Nacional (loan)

Senior career*
Years	Team	Apps	(Gls)
2017	Albion	0	(0)
2020–2023	Nacional	0	(0)
2023	→ Rentistas (loan)	29	(0)
2024–2025	Magallanes	46	(0)
2026–	Liverpool Montevideo	0	(0)
- * Club domestic league appearances and goals as of 6 January 2026

Mathías Nicolás Bernatene Carle (born 24 July 2000) is a Uruguayan footballer who plays as a goalkeeper for Liverpool Montevideo.

== Club career ==
Born in Dolores, Uruguay, Bernatene was with Bella Vista in his hometown before joining Albion from Montevideo in 2017, reaching to be a substitute player in the first team. In 2018, he joined the Nacional youth system on loan from Albion.

Bernatene signed his first professional contract with Nacional in 2020, joined permanently to the first team the next year and won the 2022 league title. In January 2023, he was loaned out to Rentistas.

In January 2024, Bernatene moved abroad and signed with Chilean club Magallanes. He continued with them the next season.

Back in Uruguay, Bernatene signed with Liverpool Montevideo in January 2026.

== Personal life ==
In January 2022, Bernatene tested positive for COVID-19.
