= Julio César Antúnez =

Uruguayan footballer and manager (born 1956)

Personal information
- Full name: Julio César Antúnez Amorín
- Date of birth: 9 January 1956 (age 70)
- Place of birth: Montevideo, Uruguay
- Position: Defender

Senior career*
Years	Team	Apps	(Gls)
1973–1980	River Plate Montevideo		
1980–1982	Aviación	34	(2)
1982	LDU Quito	4	(0)
1983	9 de Octubre		
1983	Green Cross-Temuco	19	(1)
1984	Fernández Vial	8	(5)
1985	Trasandino		
1986	Deportes Iquique	9	(1)
1987	Liverpool Montevideo		

Managerial career
- 1987–1990: Liverpool Montevideo
- 1991: Central Español
- 1992: Deportes Concepción
- 1993–1995: Bella Vista
- 1995: LDU Portoviejo
- 1996–1997: Central Español
- 1998–1999: Liverpool Montevideo
- 1999–2000: River Plate Montevideo
- 2001–2003: Xelajú
- 2004: Cobán Imperial
- 2005–2006: Central Español
- 2007: Tacuarembó
- 2008: Suchitepéquez
- 2009: Atenas
- 2010: Miramar Misiones
- 2011–2012: Liverpool Montevideo
- 2015–2017: El Tanque Sisley
- 2018: Rampla Juniors
- 2019: Cerro
- 2021: Rampla Juniors
- * Club domestic league appearances and goals

Julio César Antúnez Amorín (born 9 January 1956) is a former Uruguayan footballer and manager who played for clubs of Uruguay, Chile and Ecuador and managed in clubs of Uruguay, Chile, Ecuador and Guatemala.
