= Hugo Parga =

Uruguayan football manager

Personal information
- Full name: Hugo Parga Zanelli
- Date of birth: 17 November 1961 (age 64)
- Place of birth: San Carlos, Uruguay

Managerial career
- Years: Team
- 2007: Atenas de San Carlos
- 2007–2008: Deportivo Maldonado
- 2008: Tacuarembó
- 2010: Rampla Juniors
- 2012: Cerro
- 2013: Atenas de San Carlos
- 2017–2019: Deportivo Maldonado
- 2023–2024: Atenas de San Carlos

Hugo Parga Zanelli (born 17 November 1961) is a Uruguayan football manager.
