= Diego Bonilla =

Uruguayan footballer

Personal information
- Full name: Diego Martín Bonilla Bastos
- Date of birth: September 21, 1980 (age 46)
- Place of birth: Montevideo, Uruguay
- Height: 1.79 m (5 ft 10 in)
- Position: Defender

Senior career*
| Years | Team | Apps | (Gls) |
| 2000–2002 | Montevideo Wanderers | | |
| 2003 | Villa Española | | |
| 2003–2012 | Rentistas | | |
| 2004–2005 | → Nacional (loan) | | |
| 2007 | → Millonarios (loan) | | |
| 2008 | → Atlético Bucaramanga (loan) | | |
| 2013–2014 | Central Español | | |
- * Club domestic league appearances and goals

Diego Martín Bonilla Bastos (born September 21, 1980) is a Uruguayan former professional footballer who played as a defender.
