= Eduardo Favaro =

Uruguayan footballer and manager (born 1963)

Personal information
- Full name: Eduardo Jorge Favaro Carbajal
- Date of birth: 26 March 1963 (age 63)
- Place of birth: Montevideo, Uruguay
- Position: Forward

Team information
- Current team: Chacaritas (manager)

Youth career
- Nacional

Senior career*
Years	Team	Apps	(Gls)
1984–1985	Nacional		
1986	Montevideo Wanderers		
1987	Sud América		
1988	Bella Vista		
1989–1990	Liverpool Montevideo		
1991	Argentinos Juniors	2	(1)
1992	Racing Montevideo		
1993	Defensor Sporting		
1994	Rampla Juniors		
1995	El Tanque Sisley		

Managerial career
- 2007: Racing Montevideo
- 2008–2011: Liverpool Montevideo
- 2012–2013: Fénix
- 2013–2015: Liverpool Montevideo
- 2015–2018: El Nacional
- 2019: Aucas
- 2019: Racing Montevideo
- 2021: Macará
- 2022: Olmedo
- 2023–: Chacaritas
- * Club domestic league appearances and goals

Eduardo Jorge Favaro Carbajal (born 26 March 1963) is a Uruguayan football manager and former player who played as a forward. He is the current manager of Ecuadorian club Chacaritas.

== Career ==
Favaro was born in Montevideo, and was a Nacional youth graduate. He subsequently failed to settle for a club in his entire playing career, representing mainly teams in the Uruguayan Primera División, aside from Argentinos Juniors in 1991.

Favaro retired in 1995 at the age of 32, after playing for El Tanque Sisley. He began his managerial career in 2007 with a club he also represented as a player, Racing de Montevideo. After winning the 2007 Apertura in Segunda División, he was named manager of another former club, Liverpool Montevideo.

Favaro left Liverpool in June 2011, and was appointed in charge of Fénix on 3 May 2012. On 26 June 2013, he returned to Liverpool.

Favaro moved to Ecuador in November 2015, after being appointed manager of El Nacional. He took over fellow league team Aucas on 23 December 2018, but was sacked the following 29 April.

Favaro returned to Racing on 25 September 2019, but left in the end of the season after suffering relegation. On 25 December 2020, after nearly one year without a club, he returned to Ecuador to manage Macará.

== Honours ==
Racing Montevideo

- Uruguayan Segunda División: 2007 Apertura
