= Sebastián Suárez (footballer) =

Uruguayan footballer (born 1978)

Personal information
- Full name: Sebastián Marcelo Suárez López
- Date of birth: 19 February 1978 (age 48)
- Place of birth: Montevideo, Uruguay
- Height: 1.78 m (5 ft 10 in)
- Position: Midfielder

Youth career
- Bella Vista

Senior career*
Years	Team	Apps	(Gls)
1996–2000	Bella Vista		
2001–2003	Liverpool Montevideo		
2005–2007	Central Español	61	(6)
2008	Fénix	25	(0)
2008–2012	Cerro	69	(4)
2009	→ Cobresal (loan)	9	(0)
2010–2011	→ Defensor Sporting (loan)	20	(2)
2012–2013	Atenas	15	(0)
2013	Canadian		
- * Club domestic league appearances and goals

Sebastián Marcelo Suárez López (born 19 February 1978, in Montevideo, Uruguay) is a Uruguayan former footballer who played in the top divisions of Uruguay and Chile.

== Teams ==
- (Uruguay) Bella Vista 1996–2000
- (Uruguay) Liverpool 2001–2003
- (Uruguay) Central Español 2004–2007
- (Uruguay) Fénix 2007–2008
- (Uruguay) Cerro 2008–2009
- (Chile) Cobresal 2009
- (Uruguay) Cerro 2010
- (Uruguay) Defensor Sporting 2010–2011
- (Uruguay) Cerro 2011–2012
- (Uruguay) Atenas de San Carlos 2012–2013
- (Uruguay) Canadian 2013
