= Gustavo Díaz =

Uruguayan footballer and manager (born 1974)

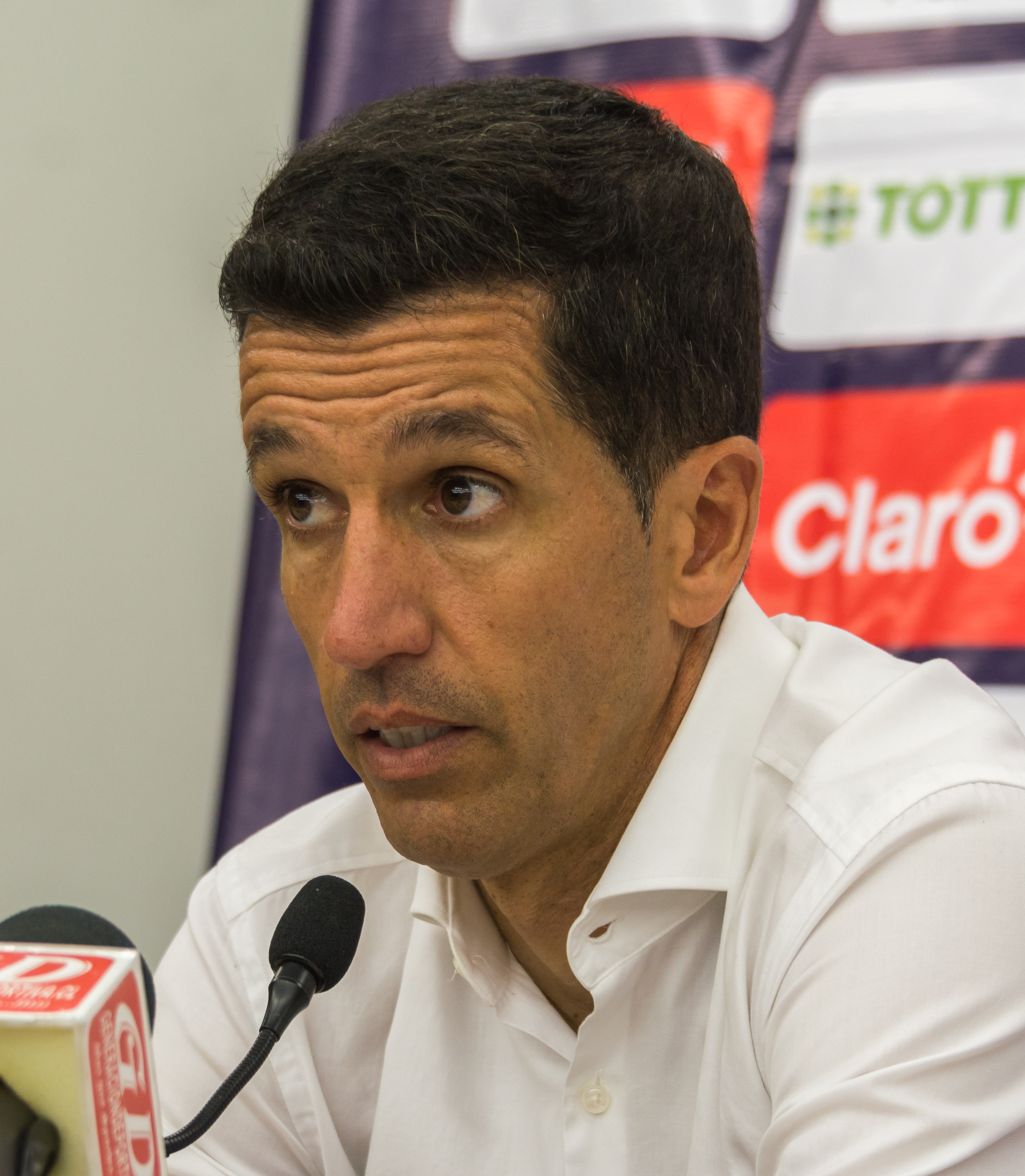
- Díaz in 2019

Personal information
- Full name: Gustavo Díaz Domínguez
- Date of birth: 7 November 1974 (age 51)
- Place of birth: Montevideo, Uruguay
- Height: 1.77 m (5 ft 9 1/2 in)
- Position: Defender

Senior career*
Years	Team	Apps	(Gls)
1992–1997	River Plate Montevideo		
1997–2000	Valladolid	0	(0)
1998–1999	→ Albacete (loan)	4	(1)
2000	Defensor Sporting		
2001	River Plate		
2002–2003	Bella Vista		
2004	Atenas de San Carlos		
2005	Paysandú		

Managerial career
- 2008: Central Español
- 2012: Defensor Sporting
- 2012–2013: Nacional
- 2013: Guaraní
- 2013–2014: Blooming
- 2015–2017: Celaya
- 2017: Universidad Católica del Ecuador
- 2017–2018: Club León
- 2018–2019: Everton Viña del Mar
- 2021–2023: River Plate Montevideo
- 2024: Deportivo Maldonado
- 2026: UAT
- * Club domestic league appearances and goals

Gustavo "Chavo" Díaz Domínguez (born 7 November 1974) is a Uruguayan football manager and former player who played as a defender. Recently he was the manager of Mexican team UAT.
