= Estadio Victor Della Valle =

Football stadium in Uruguay

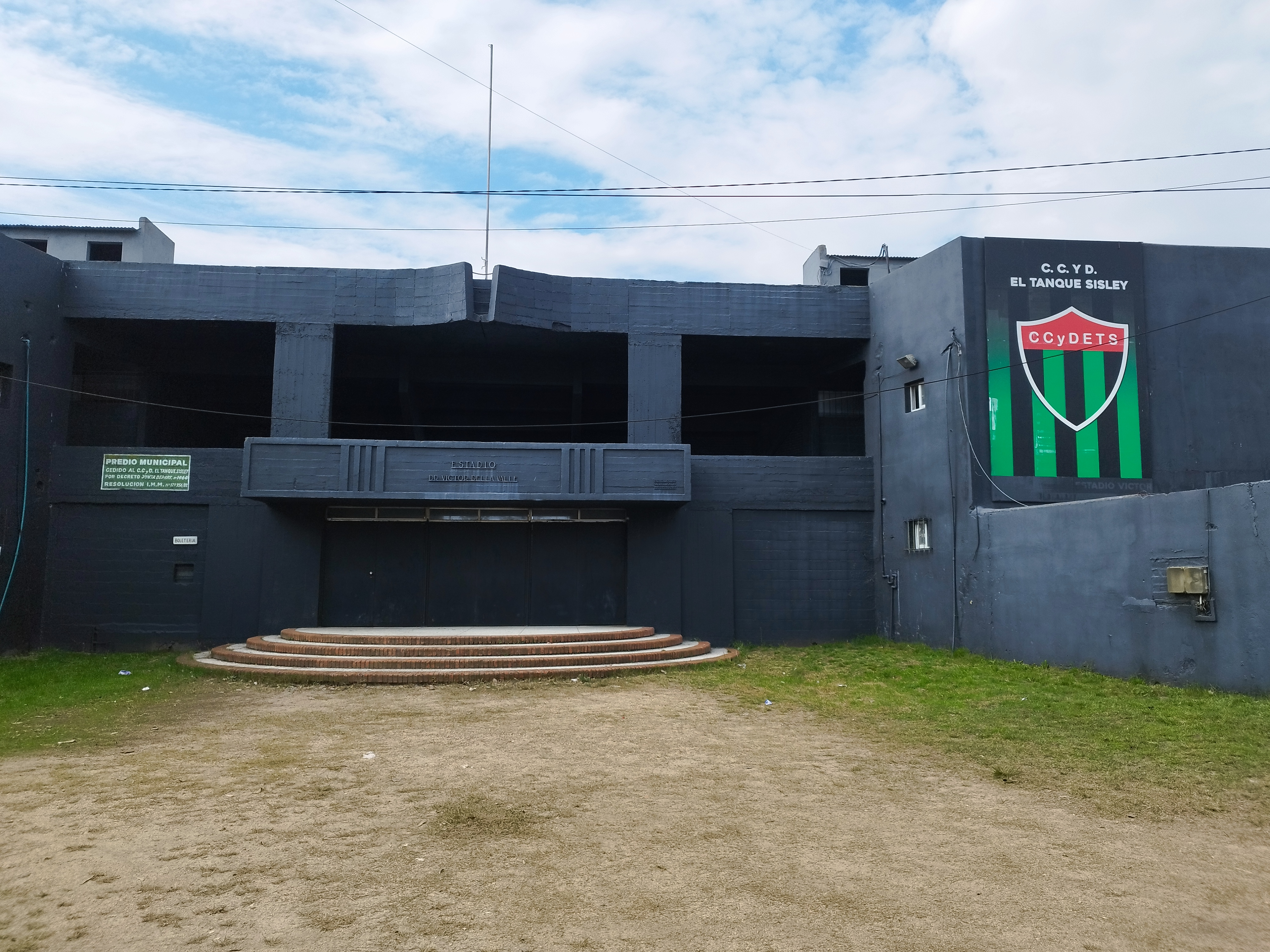
- Interactive map of Estadio Victor Della Valle
- Location: Carrasco, Montevideo, Uruguay
- Coordinates: 34°52′20.46″S 56°3′26.37″W
- Owner: El Tanque Sisley
- Capacity: 6,000
- Surface: grass

Construction
- Groundbreaking: June 1, 1983
- Opened: June 28, 1992
- Renovated: 2010
- Cost: 250,000 US dollars

Tenant
- El Tanque Sisley

The Estadio Victor Della Valle is a football stadium in Carrasco Norte, Montevideo, Uruguay with a capacity of 6,000. It is the home stadium of El Tanque Sisley, a team in the Uruguayan Primera División.
