= Estadio Belvedere (1909) =

Football stadium in Montevideo, Uruguay

Belvedere Stadium
- Estadio Belvedere
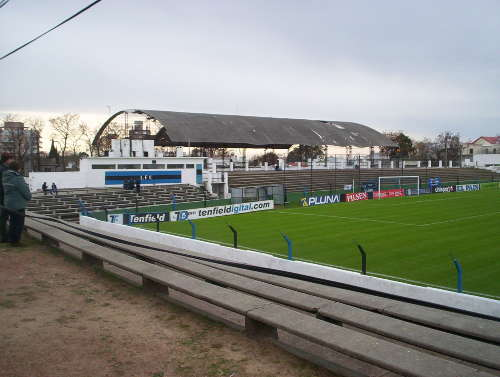
- The stadium in 2005
- Interactive map of Belvedere Stadium
- Location: Montevideo, Uruguay
- Coordinates: 34°51′17.72″S 56°13′32.48″W
- Capacity: 8,000
- Surface: Lawn

Construction
- Opened: July 4, 1909; 117 years ago
- Closed: December 13, 2025; 11 months ago
- Demolished: May–June 2026

Tenant
- Liverpool FC (1938–2025)

Website
- liverpoolfc.com.uy/estadio-belvedere

Estadio Belvedere Was a Uruguayan stadium located in the Belvedere neighborhood of Montevideo, owned by Liverpool Fútbol Club, with an approximate capacity of 7,780 spectators. It was inaugurated on July 4, 1909, with a match played between Montevideo Wanderers Club and Dublín. In 1938, it was leased to Liverpool Fútbol Club, and in 2000, it became the club's property following the acquisition of the site from the Ministry of Public Health.

Following a farewell event on December 13, 2025, the stadium's demolition began in May 2026 to make way for the Nuevo Estadio Belvedere, a roofed stadium with a capacity of 20,000 spectators.

== History ==
In the past, this site was used by Montevideo Wanderers and a now-defunct team called Platense. These teams were forced to leave the stadium at the request of the Ministry of Public Health, which planned to build a hospital (Hospital del Norte) on the property. Although the hospital's foundation stone was laid, the facility was never built; this paved the way for Liverpool's arrival in 1938, with the club playing its first official home match on October 30 of that year.

=== Uruguay National Football Team ===
The venue has a unique history, as it was here in 1910 that the Uruguayan national team wore its sky-blue kit for the first time. A plaque at the stadium commemorates this event.

=== Floodlight System ===
On April 18, 1988, Liverpool inaugurated a new floodlight system by facing the Cuban national team. The match—which ended 0–0, with Liverpool winning on penalties—drew an attendance of over 4,000. Eduardo Pereyra, who had won the Copa América with Uruguay in Argentina the previous year (1987), was the evening's special guest.

The floodlight system was not used as originally intended; the match against Cuba—which served as the system's inauguration—turned out to be the last night game played at the "Negriazul" stadium. The venue's original lighting system had previously been installed in 1955.
