= Juan Ramón Carrasco =

Uruguayan footballer and coach (born 1956)

Personal information
- Full name: Juan Ramón Carrasco Torres
- Date of birth: 15 September 1956 (age 70)
- Place of birth: Sarandí del Yí, Uruguay
- Position: Midfielder

Senior career*
Years	Team	Apps	(Gls)
1974–1978	Nacional	112	(40)
1979–1980	River Plate	37	(13)
1980-1981	Racing Club	55	(28)
1982–1983	Tecos UAG	28	(4)
1984	Nacional	?	(?)
1985	Cúcuta Deportivo	11	(2)
1985	Danubio	?	(?)
1986	Nacional	?	(?)
1987	Cádiz	10	(2)
1988	River Plate UY	?	(?)
1989	Peñarol	19	(4)
1990	São Paulo	4	(0)
1990	River Plate UY	15	(15)
1991	Bella Vista	?	(?)
1992	Marítimo Caracas	?	(?)
1993–1994	River Plate UY	?	(?)
1995	Nacional	15	(5)
1996	Rampla Juniors	?	(?)
1997	Nacional	15	(5)
2000–2001	Rocha	35	(12)

International career
1975–1985	Uruguay	19	(3)

Managerial career
- 2000–2001: Rocha
- 2002: Fénix
- 2003–2004: Uruguay
- 2007–2010: River Plate Montevideo
- 2010–2011: Nacional
- 2011: Emelec
- 2012: Atlético Paranaense
- 2012: Danubio
- 2015–2016: River Plate Montevideo
- 2018–2021: Fénix
- * Club domestic league appearances and goals

Juan Ramón Carrasco Torres (born 15 September 1956) is a Uruguayan football coach and former player. He is one of the players who had the most appearances, in different rosters, in Uruguay.

== Playing career ==
Born in Sarandi del Yí, Uruguay, Carrasco started his career in 1973 playing for Nacional. He played 19 times for Uruguay, for whom he scored three goals.

Carrasco also played for River Plate and Racing Club in Argentina, and played professional football in Mexico, Brazil, Spain, Colombia and Venezuela.

== Coaching career ==
Carrasco started coaching in 2000. He won his first title as the coach of Uruguayan Nacional in Uruguayan First Division. His best international performance was made in River Plate during 2009 as the team reached the semi-finals for Copa Sudamericana. On July 6, 2011, he signed with Emelec of Ecuador to replace Omar "el Turco" Asad. On November 27, six months later, he resigned. On December 26, he signed with Atlético Paranaense of Brazil. He played as an attacking midfielder.

Between 2003 and 2004, Carrasco was the manager of Uruguay.
