= Club Atlético River Plate (Montevideo) =

Uruguayan association football club

River Plate
- Full name: Club Atlético River Plate
- Nicknames: Darsenero (Docker); La Dársena
- Founded: 11 May 1932; 94 years ago
- Ground: Estadio Saroldi, Montevideo, Uruguay
- Capacity: 6,000 (all seated)
- Chairman: Jorge Cibreiro
- Coach: Raúl Salazar
- League: Uruguayan Segunda División
- 2025: Liga AUF Uruguaya, 15th of 16 (relegated by average)
- Website: cariverplate.uy
Home colours	Away colours	Third colours

Club Atlético River Plate is a Uruguayan football club based in Montevideo. The club currently plays in the Primera División, the top level of the Uruguayan football league system. This is not the same River Plate F.C. that won the Uruguayan league in the early 20th century.

== History ==
River Plate de Montevideo is the result of the merger of former clubs Olimpia and Capurro. After its foundation on 11 May 1932, one of the first objectives reached was the settlement of a new football pitch. The managers decided to establish the "Olimpia Park" (today called Estadio Saroldi) as its home stadium. The name of the stadium was settled in honour of River's first goalkeeper, Federico Omar Saroldi, who died after playing a match against Central Español from an injury suffered during the game.

During the early years (from 1932 until 1942) some of the greatest players in Uruguay's history played in River Plate, such as Severino Varela and Héctor Sena Puricelli. Before Olimpia and Capurro were merged, Isabelino Gradín, who can be considered the first Uruguayan football star, played for the Olimpia side.

=== Rise in the Primera División ===
River Plate's highest league position was reached in 1992. Osvaldo Canobbio, Juan Ramón Carrasco, Diego López and Edgardo Adinolfi were involved in the squad with Víctor Púa as coach. Nacional won the title based on the skills of the notable forward Julio Dely Valdés. In 1997 River Plate reached third overall position, just three points from Peñarol and Defensor Sporting who qualified for the finals. By those times, River Plate was coached by Fernando Morena. Some of the best River Plate's players were raised in that generation, such as Hernán Rodrigo López, Pablo Gaglianone and Gustavo Díaz.

Another great performance was reached in 2007/2008 season, which resulted in River achieving the second position in the annual qualifying; by those years River was coached by Juan Ramón Carrasco. Some of the best players of the tournament were part of that roster: Robert Flores was considered the best player of the season, other key figures such as Pablo Tiscornia, Henry Giménez, Mauricio Prieto, Bruno Montelongo and goalkeeper Álvaro García were also part of the first roster. Some of the most important victories during the tournament were against Peñarol (6–3), Defensor Sporting (5–1) and Danubio (5–1). The highest score registered was against Rampla Juniors (7–0).

=== 2009 Copa Sudamericana ===
River Plate played semifinals in 2009 Copa Sudamericana, which was the best result achieved in an international competition. Coached by Juan Ramón Carrasco, River Plate eliminated Vitória in the round of 16, San Lorenzo in quarterfinals and lost against LDU Quito, reaching the top four. Only Danubio and Defensor Sporting, among the so-called "minor" Uruguayan clubs, have reached the semifinals of an international CONMEBOL competition.

=== Last years ===
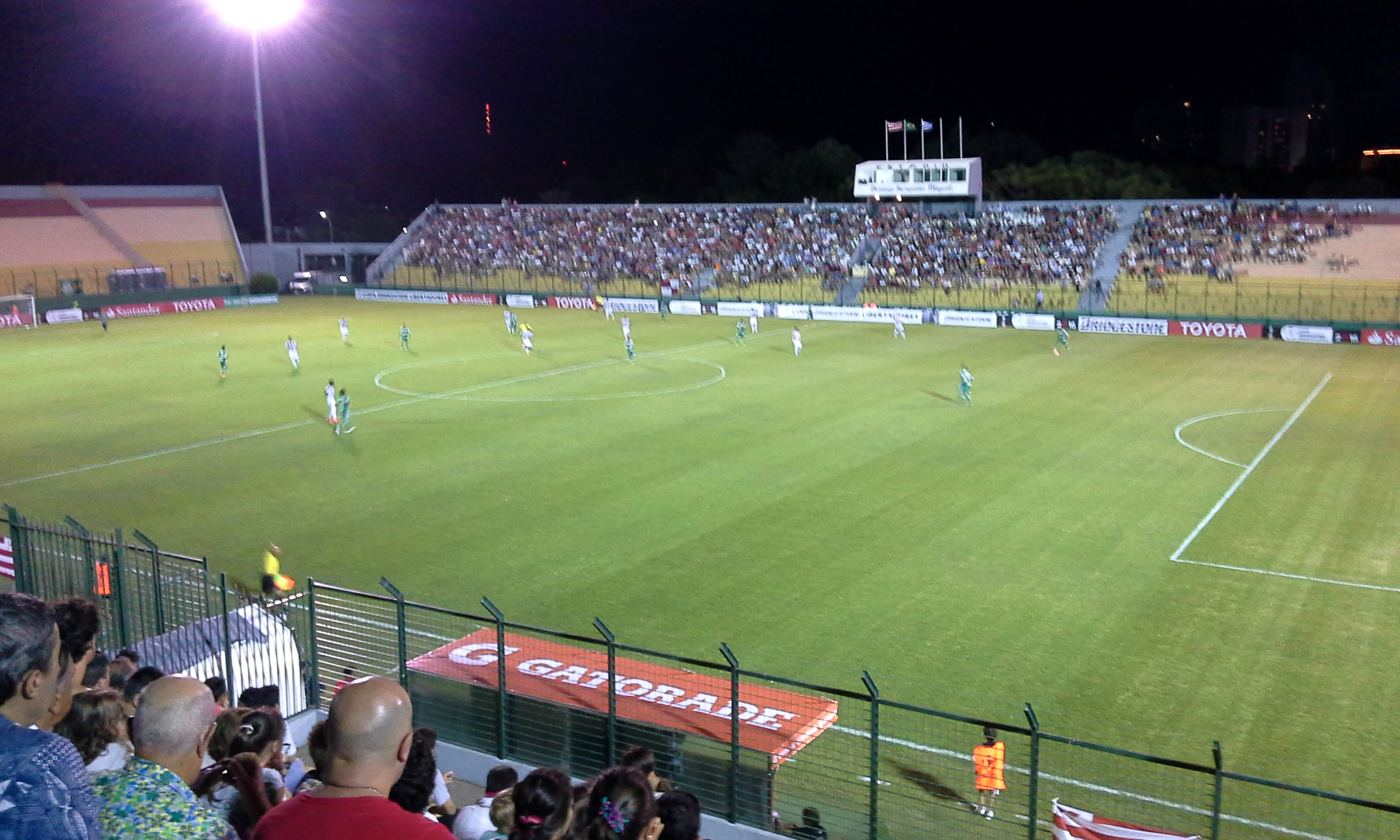
River Plate Montevideo playing against Palmeiras for Copa Libertadores 2016

River Plate was coached by Guillermo Almada between April 2011 and June 2015. During those years River Plate positioned among the top six almost every season, qualifying for CONMEBOL official tournaments. Some key important players in those years were: Michael Santos, Cristian González, Damián Frascarelli, Leandro Rodríguez, Cristian Techera, Gabriel Marques, Gabriel Leyes, Gonzalo Porras, Felipe Avenatti, Lucas Olaza, Sebastián Taborda among others. The highest point of this process was reached after qualifying for the 2016 Copa Libertadores, the first time in club's history. They were drawn in group B along with Rosario Central, Palmeiras, and fellow Uruguayans Club Nacional. They drew 3 games, earning 3 points, and ended in last place of the group.

After Guillermo Almada joined Barcelona of Ecuador, since June 2015 until September 2016, Juan Ramón Carrasco was the coach of the first roster with disastrous results (a very different situation from his first campaign). After Pablo Tiscornia and Jorge Giordano, Jorge Fossati took over as manager, in June 2019 until April 2021. During Fossati's tenure, River Plate made the third stage of the 2020 Copa Sudamericana, where they eliminated Colombian powerhouse and two-time Libertadores champion Atlético Nacional in the second stage, 4–2 on aggregate. In the round of 16 they were only eliminated through away goals against Universidad Católica. Their league form was indifferent: in the Apertura they finished twelfth and in the Clausura they finished eighth, for an aggregate table position of eighth in the table.

In April 2021, Gustavo Díaz took over as head coach. This season was almost the same as the previous one, with the club finishing eighth in the aggregate table again, although securing a Sudamericana spot unlike what occurred in the 2020 season.

The club had a poor showing in the 2022 Copa Sudamericana, finishing last in their group with two wins and four losses, which cost Gustavo Diaz his position as head coach.

== Venues ==
=== Parque Federico Omar Saroldi ===
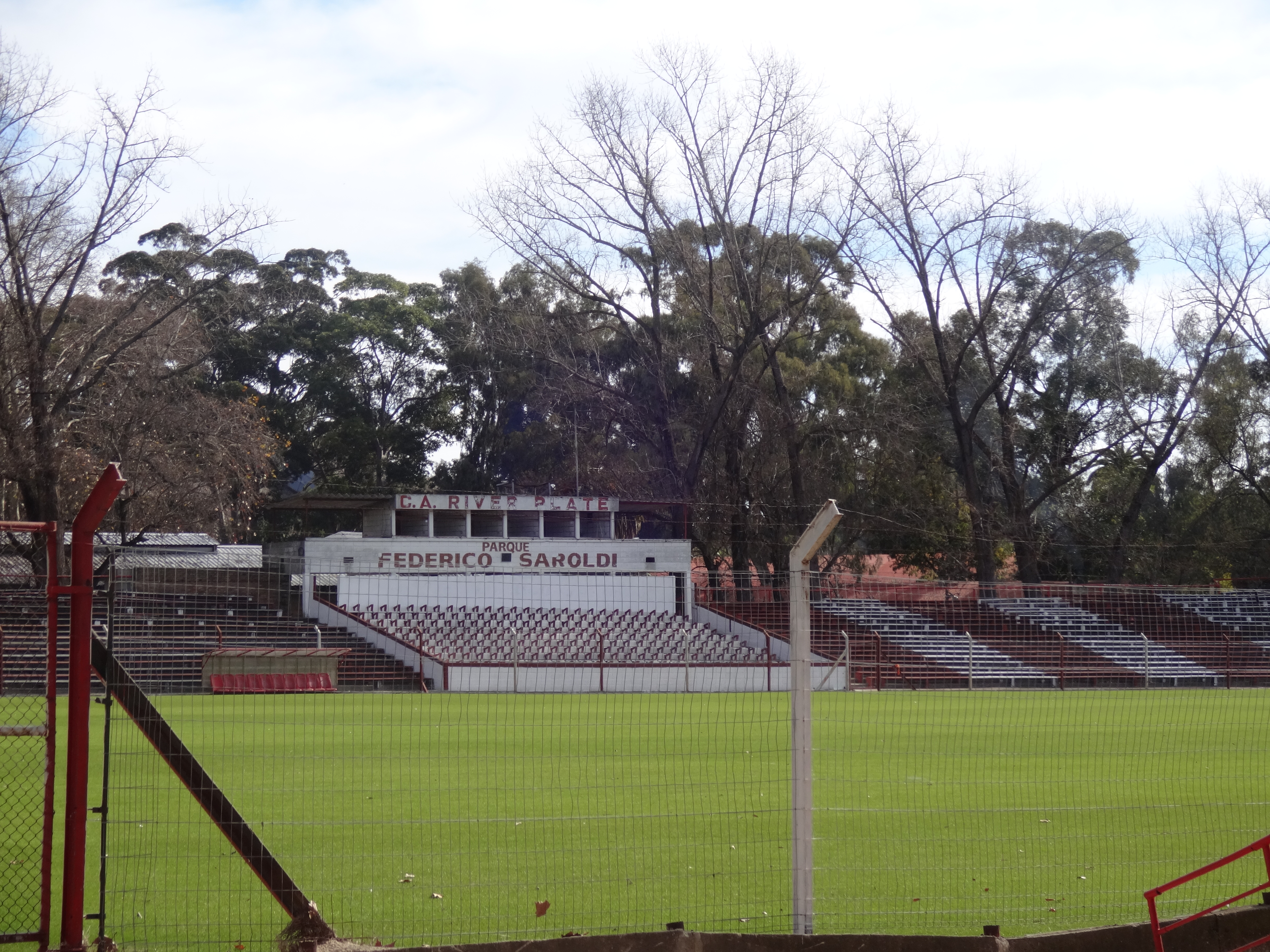
A view of Saroldi's pitch from the visitors' entrance

River Plate usually play their home games at Estadio Saroldi, which is located in Montevideo's Prado neighborhood (western side of the city), has a capacity of 6,000 supporters and one of the best pitches in the league. The stadium was originally named "Olimpia Park", as it was Club Atlético Olimpia's home ground. After joining Olimpia and Capurro, and the unfortunate death of goalkeeper Federico Omar Saroldi (one of the first River's goalkeepers), the stadium was renamed in honor of the said keeper.

=== Villa Colón Sports Complex ===
Located in the neighborhood of Villa Colón (northwest of Montevideo), these facilities are used to train both the first-team squad's as the youth squads. This sports complex has six football pitches, first-division team's base camp, locker rooms, dormitories, fitness centers, and health services. It's considered one of the best equipped training camps in the country, and was inaugurated in August 1999.

== Uniform ==
River Plate's kit is similar to that used by River Plate F.C., its predecessor, which dissolved in 1929. C.A. River Plate's away kit is sometimes a sky blue jersey, black shorts and socks. This kit was adopted by the Uruguay national football team in 1910 as a homage to the disbanded River Plate F.C. (four times champions of Uruguay) who defeated the best team of the Americas at the time, the Argentine team Alumni. Thus, the worldwide known "celeste" jersey was taken by the national team from the club away kit. Before 1910 Uruguay wore several jerseys including dark blue, green, striped white and sky blue, similar to that of Argentina among others.

=== Kit evolution ===
1932	1994	1996	1996 away	2001	2005 away	2006 away	2012–2016	2012–2016 away	2016-present

== Rivalries ==
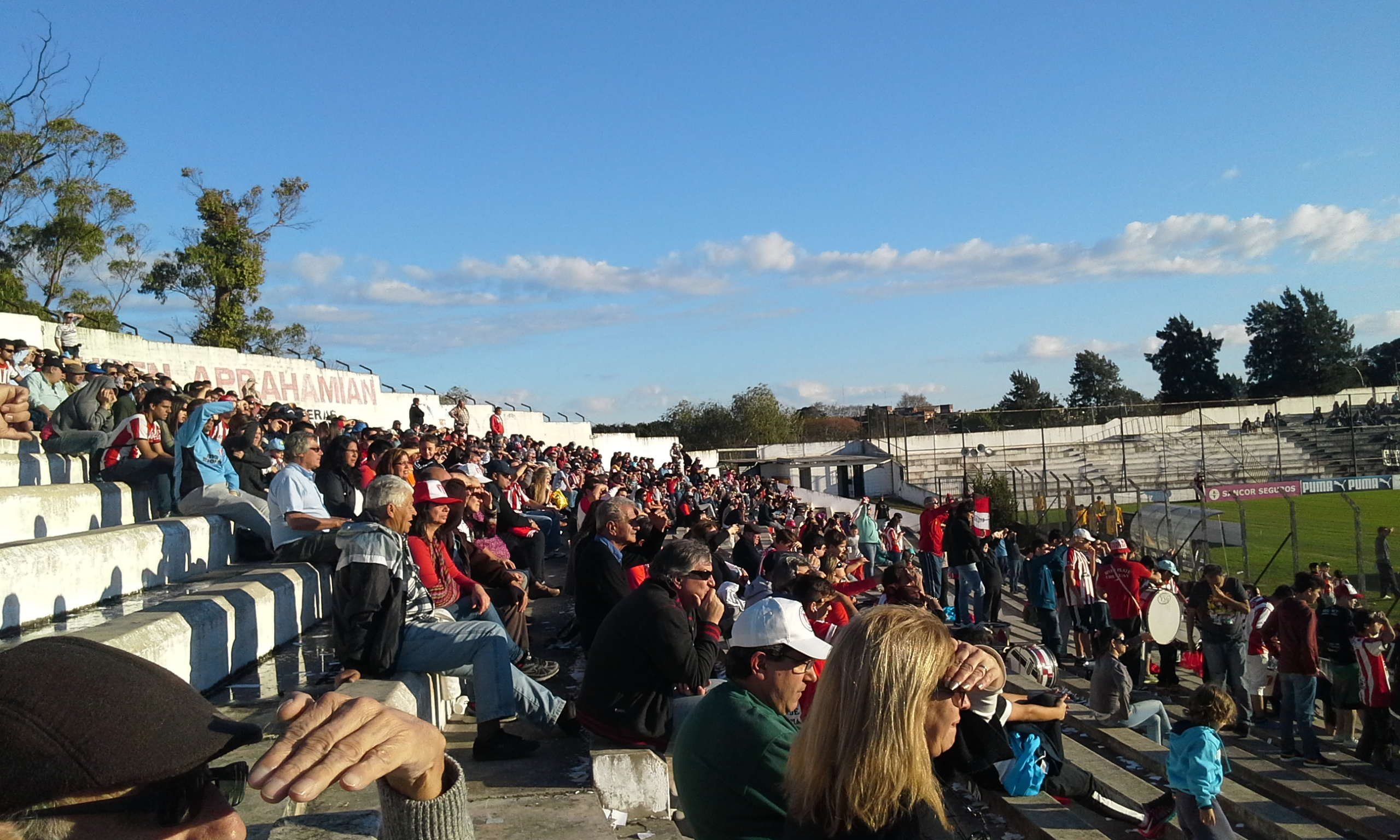
River Plate's supporters at Jardines del Hipódromo stadium, in June 2015

River is based in the same neighborhood where Bella Vista and Montevideo Wanderers play, which is the Prado neighborhood. These three clubs have a long rivalry with each other, and matches between them are known as the "Clásico del Prado".

During the last ten years, River Plate has had the upper hand in derby matches against both rivals, winning most of the matches.

== Players ==
=== First team squad ===
As of 23 August, 2025

Note: Flags indicate national team as defined under FIFA eligibility rules; some limited exceptions apply. Players may hold more than one non-FIFA nationality.

No.	Pos.	Nation	Player
1	GK	URU	Damián Frascarelli
2	DF	URU	Facundo Pérez
3	DF	SUI	Dylan Gissi
4	DF	URU	Lautaro Pertusatti
5	MF	ARG	Jonathan Rodríguez
6	DF	URU	Rodrigo Cabrera
7	FW	URU	Joaquín Lavega
8	MF	URU	Mauro Estol
9	FW	URU	Tiziano Correa
10	FW	URU	Agustín Vera
11	FW	URU	Nicolás Schiappacasse
13	DF	URU	Christian Almeida
14	FW	URU	Facundo de León

No.	Pos.	Nation	Player
15	MF	URU	Emiliano Jourdan
16	MF	URU	Cristian Sención
18	FW	ITA	Inti López
21	DF	URU	Franco Cabrera
22	MF	PAR	Matías Alfonso
23	DF	URU	Emilio Crespo
24	FW	URU	Matías Mier
25	GK	URU	Fabrizio Correa
26	MF	URU	Guillermo Oroño
27	MF	ITA	Ian López
28	DF	URU	Lorenzo González
29	DF	URU	Lucas Camejo
30	FW	URU	Diego Sánchez

=== Out on loan ===
Note: Flags indicate national team as defined under FIFA eligibility rules; some limited exceptions apply. Players may hold more than one non-FIFA nationality.

No. / Pos. / Nation / Player; — / DF / URU / Fabricio Vidal (at Uruguay Montevideo until 31 December 2024)	No. / Pos. / Nation / Player; — / MF / URU / Rodrigo Pintado (at Uruguay Montevideo until 31 December 2024)

== Managerial history ==
- (Uruguay) Ondino Viera (1936–37)
- (Uruguay) Roque Máspoli (1968)
- (Uruguay) Sergio Markarián (1981)
- (Uruguay) Aníbal Ruiz (1984–assistant)
- (Uruguay) Fernando Morena (1989)
- (Uruguay) Víctor Púa (1990–93)
- (Uruguay) Sergio Markarián (1993)
- (Uruguay) Jorge Fossati (1993–95)
- (Uruguay) Wilmar Cabrera (1996)
- (Uruguay) Fernando Morena (1996–98)
- (Uruguay) Adán Machado (1998–99)
- (Uruguay) Carlos Linaris (1999)
- (Uruguay) Julio César Antúnez (1999–00)
- (Uruguay) Adán Machado (2000)
- (Uruguay) Santiago Ostolaza (2001)
- (Uruguay) Ricardo Ortíz (2001)
- (Uruguay) Fernando Morena (2003)
- (Uruguay) Martín Lasarte (2003–04)
- (Uruguay) Pablo Bengoechea and Oscar Aguirregaray (2005–06)
- (Uruguay) Juan Ramón Carrasco (1 Jan 2006 – 1 May 2010)
- (Uruguay) Eduardo Del Capellán (1 July 2010 – 16 Nov 2010)
- (Uruguay) Carlos María Morales (Nov 2010 – April 2011)
- (Uruguay) Guillermo Almada (5 April 2011 – 15 June 2015)
- (Uruguay) Juan Ramón Carrasco (17 June 2015 – 26 September 2016)
- (Uruguay) Pablo Tiscornia (27 September 2016 – 26 December 2016)
- (Uruguay) Julio Avelino Comesaña (26 December 2016 – 13 March 2017)
- (Uruguay) Pablo Tiscornia (14 March 2017 – 24 August 2018)
- (Uruguay) Jorge Giordano (27 August 2018 – 9 June 2019)
- (Uruguay) Jorge Fossati (12 June 2019 – 2 April 2021)
- (Uruguay) Gustavo Díaz (4 April 2021-)

== Honours ==
=== National ===
- Torneo Preparación
  - Winners (1): 2012
- Copa Integración
  - Winners (1): 2012
- Segunda División
  - Winners (6): 1943, 1967, 1978, 1984, 1991, 2004

=== Friendly tournaments ===
- Copa Aerosur Internacional
  - Winners (1): 2010
