= El Tanque Sisley =

Uruguayan football club

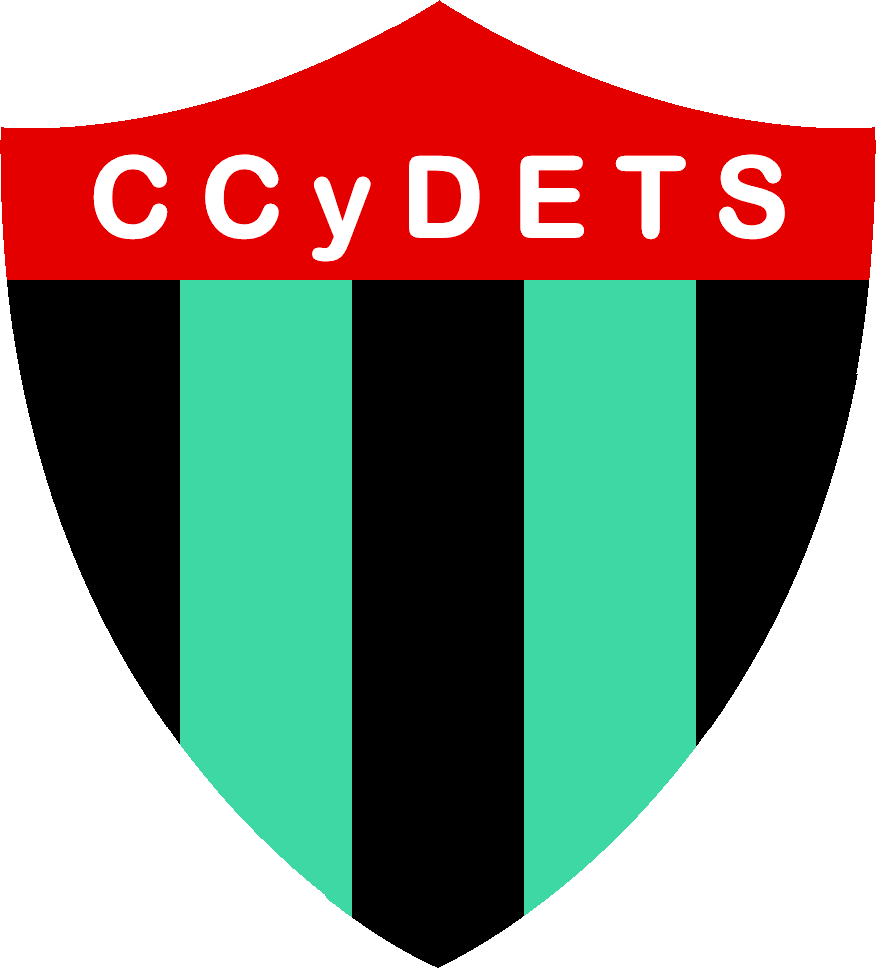
- Full name: Centro Cultural y Deportivo El Tanque Sisley
- Nicknames: Tanque, Fusionados
- Founded: 16 April 1941; 85 years ago
- Ground: Estadio Victor Della Valle, Montevideo, Uruguay
- Capacity: 6,000
- Chairman: Fredy Varela
- Manager: Julio César Antúnez
- League: Uruguayan Tercera División
- 2017: 9th
- Website: https://web.archive.org/web/20110528060837/http://www.eltanquesisley.com.uy/
Home colours	Away colours

El Tanque Sisley is a football club from Montevideo in Uruguay. They currently play in the Uruguayan 3rd Division.

The club were founded in 1955 with the name Club Atlético El Tanque, on December 15, 1981 the club were amalgamated with Club Cultural y Deportivo Sisley to form Centro Cultural y Deportivo El Tanque Sisley. Colors were taken from Rosarino Central, one of the big clubs of the F.U.F era.

== Titles ==
- Segunda División (3): 1981, 1990, 2009–10, 2016
- Tercera División (2): 1986, 1997

== Performance in CONMEBOL competitions ==
- Copa Sudamericana: 1 appearance

2013: First stage

== Current squad ==
As of 24 October 2018. Note: Flags indicate national team as defined under FIFA eligibility rules; some limited exceptions apply. Players may hold more than one non-FIFA nationality.

No.	Pos.	Nation	Player
1	GK	URU	Juan Marroco
2	DF	ARG	Santiago Fosgt
4	DF	URU	Juan Pablo Fagúndez
5	MF	URU	Bruno Barreto
6	DF	URU	Emiliano Colombo
7	MF	BRA	Anderson Silva
8	MF	URU	Mathías López
9	FW	ARG	Alexis Ramos
10	MF	URU	Diego de Souza
11	FW	URU	Jonathan Ramírez
12	GK	URU	Jhony da Silva
13	DF	URU	Martín Arguiñarena
14	MF	URU	Ignacio Ratti
15	FW	URU	Juan Cruz Mascia
18	MF	URU	Lucas Tamareo
19	MF	URU	Ademar Martínez

No.	Pos.	Nation	Player
20	FW	URU	Enzo Herrera
22	DF	URU	Mauro Brasil
23	DF	URU	Gonzalo Rocaniere
—	FW	URU	Borys Barone
—	FW	URU	Marcos Lyford
—	FW	URU	Luis Machado
—	MF	URU	Gastón Martínez
—	MF	URU	Pablo Lima
—	MF	ARG	Franco Martínez
—	DF	URU	Mariano Cappi
—	DF	URU	Rodrigo Chocho
—	DF	URU	Álvaro Tadeo
—	DF	ARG	Santiago Segovia

== Managers ==
- (Uruguay) Ricardo "Tato" Ortíz (1990)
- (Uruguay) Wilmar Cabrera (2000)
- (Uruguay) Luis López (2002)
- (Uruguay) Julio Acuña (May 1, 2001 – April 17, 2002)
- (Uruguay) Luis Duarte (Aug 1, 2009 – May 20, 2010)
- (Uruguay) Tabaré Silva (May 22, 2010 – March 6, 2011)
- (Uruguay) Ruben Da Silva (March 6, 2011 – Aug 30, 2011)
- (Uruguay) Raúl Moller (Aug 30, 2011 – Dec 31, 2012)
- (Uruguay) Osvaldo Canobbio (Jan 1, 2013 – Aug 8, 2013)
- (Uruguay) Raúl Moller (Aug 9, 2013–2015)
- (Uruguay) Julio César Antúnez (Aug 9, 2015–2016)
- (Uruguay) Raúl Moller (2017-present)
