= Liverpool F.C. (Montevideo) =

Association football club in Montevideo, Uruguay

Liverpool
- Full name: Liverpool Fútbol Club
- Nicknames: Negriazules; Los negros de la cuchilla
- Founded: 15 February 1915; 111 years ago
- Ground: Estadio Belvedere, Montevideo, Uruguay
- Capacity: 10,000
- Chairman: José Luis Palma
- Coach: Joaquín Papa
- League: Liga AUF Uruguaya
- 2025: Liga AUF Uruguaya, 3rd of 16
- Website: liverpoolfc.com.uy
Home colours	Away colours	Third colours

Liverpool Fútbol Club is a Uruguayan professional football club based in Montevideo. The team was first promoted to the Primera División in 1919 and plays its home games at Estadio Belvedere.

== History ==
The club has its roots in the student team from the Catholic Capuchin school in Nuevo París, which began playing in 1908. The club took on the name Liverpool as there were many cultural links between the two areas; the majority of coal ships arriving in Montevideo came from the English port. A number of clubs took on Anglicised names, such as league rivals Montevideo Wanderers.

Liverpool plays home matches in Estadio Belvedere (Belvedere Stadium), formerly owned by the Montevideo Wanderers.

In 2023 Liverpool won the Primera División for the first time. They filled one of the final slots as they had the highest overall point tally during the entire season, while also filling one of the semi-final slots, as they had won the Clausura that year as well. They lost to Peñarol in the semi-finals 1–0 in extra time, due to a 119th minute goal by former Uruguay international Abel Hernández. In the finals, however, things played out differently. Liverpool won 3–0 on aggregate, recording a 2–0 win at home, and a 1–0 win during the return leg. This triumph marked the first since the 2013–14 season that a club besides Club Nacional de Football or Peñarol won the Primera División. This was also the first time that a Uruguayan club won its first Primera División title since 1990.

== CONMEBOL appearances ==
Season	Competition	Round	Country	Club	Home	Away	Aggregate
2009	Copa Sudamericana	First Round	(Peru)	Cienciano	0–0	0–2	0–2
2011	Copa Libertadores	First Round	(Brazil)	Grêmio	2–2	1–3	3–5
2012	Copa Sudamericana	First Round	(Bolivia)	Universitario	3–0	2–1	5–1
2012	Copa Sudamericana	Second Round	(Colombia)	Envigado	1–0	1–1	2–1
2012	Copa Sudamericana	Round of 16	(Argentina)	Independiente	1–2	1–2	2–4
2019	Copa Sudamericana	First Round	(Brazil)	Bahia	1–0	0–0	1–0
2019	Copa Sudamericana	Second Round	(Venezuela)	Caracas	1–0	0–2	1–2
2021	Copa Libertadores	First Round	(Ecuador)	Universidad Católica	2–1	0–3	2–4
2024	Copa Libertadores						

== Current squad ==
As of 22 March, 2026

Note: Flags indicate national team as defined under FIFA eligibility rules; some limited exceptions apply. Players may hold more than one non-FIFA nationality.

No.	Pos.	Nation	Player
1	GK	URU	Mathías Bernatene
3	DF	ARG	Santiago Strasorier (on loan from Atlético Colegiales)
4	DF	URU	Facundo Perdomo
5	MF	ARG	Nicolás Garayalde
6	MF	URU	Santiago Milano
7	FW	URU	Federico Martínez
8	MF	URU	Matías Mir (on loan from Club León)
9	FW	URU	Renzo Machado
10	FW	ARG	Ramiro Degregorio
11	FW	URU	Rubén Bentancourt
13	FW	URU	Alfonso de Luca
14	DF	URU	Jean Rosso
15	DF	ARG	Santiago Laquidaín

No.	Pos.	Nation	Player
16	MF	URU	Lucas Acosta
18	DF	URU	Agustín Cayetano
20	MF	URU	Martín Rabuñal
22	FW	URU	Diego Zabala
23	DF	URU	Enzo Castillo
24	DF	URU	Kevin Amaro
25	GK	URU	Martín Campaña
27	DF	URU	Nicolas Cabral
29	MF	URU	Ezequiel Olivera
31	FW	URU	Facundo Barceló
32	FW	LTU	Felipe Barrenechea
34	DF	URU	Kevin Lewis

=== Out on loan ===
Note: Flags indicate national team as defined under FIFA eligibility rules; some limited exceptions apply. Players may hold more than one non-FIFA nationality.

No. / Pos. / Nation / Player; — / FW / URU / Sergio Núñez (at Barcelona ECU)	No. / Pos. / Nation / Player; — / DF / URU / Francisco Bregante (at Cerro)

== Managers ==
- Danilo Hodgisi
- (Uruguay) José María Rodríguez (1963)
- (Uruguay) Eugenio "Pato" Galvalisi (19??−66)
- (Uruguay) José Sasía (1976)
- (Uruguay) Gerardo Pelusso (1991)
- (Uruguay) Julio César Antúnez (1 January 1997 – 1 January 1999)
- (Uruguay) Julio César Ribas (1 January 2002 – 22 March 2004)
- (Uruguay) Carlos Barcos (22 March 2004 – 31 August 2005)
- (Uruguay) Juan Tejera (1 July 2006 – 21 May 2007)
- (Uruguay) Carlos Manta (1 July 2007 – 26 November 2007)
- (Uruguay) Eduardo Favaro (1 January 2008 – 9 June 2011)
- (Uruguay) Diego Demarco (16 June 2011 – 3 October 2011)
- (Uruguay) Julio César Antúnez (4 October 2011 – 5 November 2012)
- (Uruguay) José Puente (6 November 2012 – 14 December 2012)
- (Uruguay) Raúl Moeller (1 January 2013 – 2 June 2013)
- (Uruguay) Eduardo Favaro (26 June 2013–1?)
- (Uruguay) Juan Verzeri (2015)
- (Uruguay) Mario Saralegui (2016)
- (Uruguay) Alejandro Bertoldi (2016–)
- (Uruguay) ??? (?)?
- (Uruguay) Paulo Pezzolano (2017–2019)
- (Uruguay) Román Cuello (2019–2020)
- (Uruguay) Marcelo Méndez (2020–2021)

== Kit evolution ==
1917	1919–present	1970, 1996	1995 away	2006 away

Source: Liverpool (Montevideo) Page – BDFA.com.ar

== Honours ==
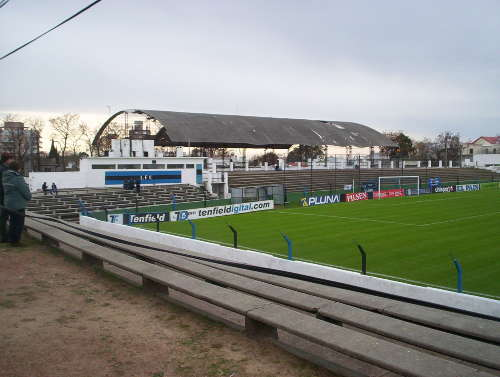
A view of the club's ground, Estadio Belvedere

=== Senior titles ===
Keys

- Record
- ^{(s)} Shared record

Type	Competition	Titles	Winning years
National (League)	Primera División	1	2023
National (League)	Segunda División	4	1966, 1987, 2002, 2014–15
National (League)	Divisional Intermedia	3	1919, 1936, 1937
National (League)	Divisional Extra	1	1916
National (League)	Liga Uruguaya de Football Amateur	1	1934
Half-year / Short tournament (League)	Torneo Apertura	2	2022, 2025
Half-year / Short tournament (League)	Torneo Clausura	3	2022, 2023, 2026
Half-year / Short tournament (League)	Torneo Intermedio	2	2019, 2023
National (Cups)	Supercopa Uruguaya	3	2020, 2023, 2024
National (Cups)	Torneo Relámpago "9 de junio de 1924"	1	1968

== Other sports ==
Liverpool FC had a basketball team until the 1990s, playing in the stadium that still exists behind the north tribune of Estadio Belvedere. The team never reached the first division.
