= 2023 Campeonato Uruguayo Primera División =

120th season of the top-tier football league in Uruguay

Liga Profesional de Primera División
- Season: 2023
- Dates: 4 February – 16 December 2023
- Champions: Liverpool (1st title)
- Relegated: Montevideo City Torque; Plaza Colonia; La Luz
- Copa Libertadores: Liverpool; Peñarol; Nacional; Defensor Sporting
- Copa Sudamericana: Racing; Montevideo Wanderers; Cerro Largo; Danubio
- Matches: 300
- Goals: 687 (2.29 per match)
- Top goalscorer: Ignacio Ramírez (19 goals)
- Biggest home win: Danubio 5–0 Plaza Colonia (26 February)
- Biggest away win: River Plate 0–4 Defensor Sporting (30 April); City Torque 0–4 Nacional (14 May)
- Highest scoring: La Luz 3–4 Peñarol (13 February)

The 2023 Liga Profesional de Primera División season, also known as the Campeonato Uruguayo de Primera División 2023, was the 120th season of the Uruguayan Primera División, Uruguay's top-flight football league, and the 93rd in which it is professional. The season, which was named "100 años del Club Atlético Cerro", began on 4 February and ended on 16 December 2023.

Liverpool won their first league title at the end of the season, defeating Peñarol in the finals by a 3–0 aggregate score. Nacional were the defending champions.

== Format ==
On 19 October 2022, the Primera División clubs voted to keep the format used in the previous season for 2023, with single round-robin Apertura and Clausura tournaments, a Torneo Intermedio played between these tournaments with the 16 teams divided into two groups of eight, and a three-team championship playoff between the winners of the Apertura and Clausura tournaments and the best team in the season's aggregate table, which gets a bye to the finals. The League Council of the Uruguayan Football Association presented a proposal to switch the order of the Apertura and Intermedio tournaments, so that the Intermedio (rebranded as Torneo Inicial in the proposal) would be played at the beginning of the season followed by the Apertura tournament during the winter months. However, the clubs did not accept the proposal and the season will be played in a similar way to the previous ones.

== Teams ==
16 teams competed in the season: the top thirteen teams in the relegation table of the 2022 season as well as three promoted teams from the Segunda División. The three lowest placed teams in the relegation table of the 2022 season, Albion, Rentistas, and Cerrito were relegated to the Segunda División for the 2023 season. They were replaced by the Segunda División champions Racing, runners-up La Luz, and the winners of the promotion play-offs Cerro.

Racing and Cerro returned to the top flight after three and two seasons, respectively, whilst La Luz played in the Primera División for the first time ever. On the other hand, Albion were relegated after one season, Cerrito were relegated after two seasons, and Rentistas returned to the second tier after three years.

=== Stadiums and locations ===
Locations of the 2023 season teams outside Montevideo.
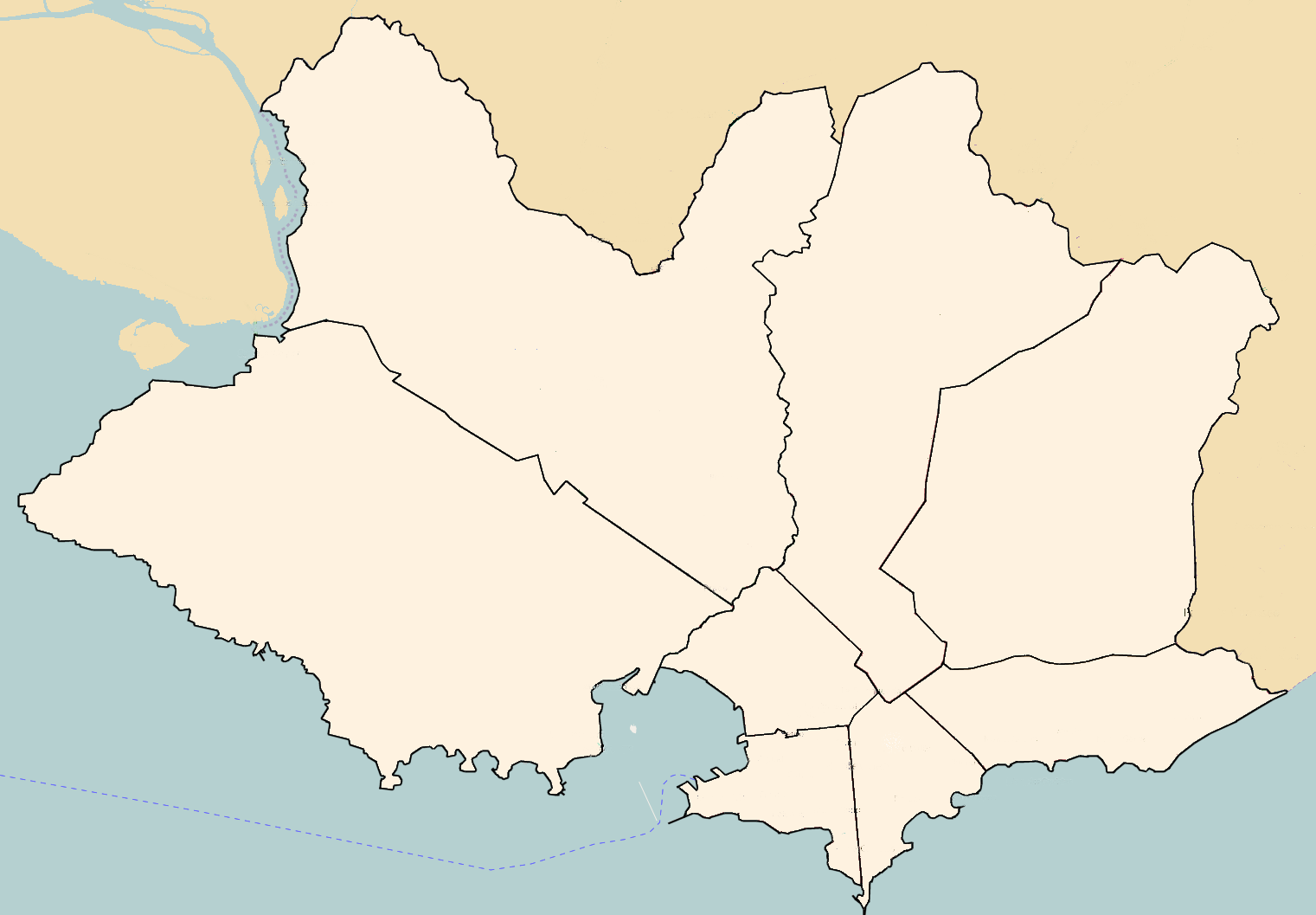
Locations of the 2023 Primera División teams within Montevideo.

Club	City	Stadium	Capacity
Boston River	Las Piedras	Parque Artigas	6,148
Cerro	Montevideo	Luis Tróccoli	25,000
Cerro Largo	Melo	Antonio Ubilla	9,000
Danubio	Montevideo	Jardines del Hipódromo	18,000
Defensor Sporting	Montevideo	Luis Franzini	18,000
Deportivo Maldonado	Maldonado	Domingo Burgueño Miguel	22,000
Fénix	Montevideo	Parque Capurro	10,000
La Luz	Montevideo	Parque Palermo	6,500
Liverpool	Montevideo	Belvedere	10,000
Montevideo City Torque	Montevideo	Centenario	60,235
Montevideo Wanderers	Montevideo	Parque Alfredo Víctor Viera	11,000
Nacional	Montevideo	Gran Parque Central	34,000
Peñarol	Montevideo	Campeón del Siglo	40,700
Plaza Colonia	Colonia	Parque Juan Prandi	4,500
Racing	Montevideo	Osvaldo Roberto	8,500
River Plate	Montevideo	Parque Federico Omar Saroldi	6,000

=== Personnel and kits ===
Team	Manager	Kit manufacturer	Shirt sponsor
Boston River	(Uruguay) Alejandro Apud	Kelme	Asociación Española, Cotrans
Cerro	(Uruguay) Damián Santín	Identidad Cerro (club manufactured kit)	Médica Uruguaya
Cerro Largo	(Uruguay) Juan Jacinto Rodríguez (caretaker)	Matgeor	Silveira Agronegocios
Danubio	(Uruguay) Mario Saralegui	Mgr Sport	
Defensor Sporting	(Uruguay) Marcelo Méndez	Puma	Médica Uruguaya
Deportivo Maldonado	(Uruguay) Fabián Coito	Joma	Enjoy Punta del Este
Fénix	(Uruguay) Leonel Rocco	Mgr Sport	Cousa
La Luz	(Uruguay) Marcelo Russo	Breus	Médica Uruguaya
Liverpool	(Uruguay) Jorge Bava	Mgr Sport	Puritas
Montevideo City Torque	(Uruguay) Leonardo Ramos	Puma	
Montevideo Wanderers	(Uruguay) Alejandro Cappuccio	Umbro	BYD
Nacional	(Uruguay) Álvaro Recoba	Umbro	Antel
Peñarol	(Uruguay) Diego Aguirre	Puma	Antel
Plaza Colonia	(Uruguay) Sebastián Díaz	Mgr Sport	DGO, Intendencia de Colonia
Racing	(Uruguay) Eduardo Espinel	Macron	DGO
River Plate	(Uruguay) Ignacio Ithurralde	Mgr Sport	Macromercado

=== Managerial changes ===
Team	Outgoing manager	Manner of departure	Date of vacancy	Position in table	Incoming manager	Date of appointment
Torneo Apertura
Montevideo City Torque	(Argentina) Lucas Nardi	End of caretaker spell	21 October 2022	Pre-season	(Uruguay) Ignacio Ithurralde	21 November 2022
Cerro Largo	(Uruguay) Mario Saralegui	End of contract	22 October 2022	Pre-season	(Uruguay) Eduardo Espinel	10 November 2022
Plaza Colonia	(Uruguay) Alejandro Cappuccio	End of contract	23 October 2022	Pre-season	(Uruguay) Nicolás Vigneri (Note: Alejandro Apud was appointed manager of the club on 3 December 2022, but resigned on 5 January 2023.)	5 January 2023
Racing	(Uruguay) Damián Santín	Resigned	27 October 2022	Pre-season	(Argentina) Gustavo Fermani	16 November 2022
Danubio	(Uruguay) Jorge Fossati	End of contract	4 November 2022	Pre-season	(Uruguay) Esteban Conde	14 November 2022
Boston River	(Uruguay) Ignacio Ithurralde	End of contract	4 November 2022	Pre-season	(Venezuela) Daniel Farías	17 November 2022
Deportivo Maldonado	(Uruguay) Francisco Palladino	Signed by Santiago Wanderers	7 November 2022	Pre-season	(Uruguay) Fabián Coito	19 November 2022
Peñarol	(Uruguay) Leonardo Ramos	Sacked	7 November 2022	Pre-season	(Uruguay) Alfredo Arias	25 November 2022
Nacional	(Uruguay) Pablo Repetto	End of contract	31 December 2022	Pre-season	(Argentina) Ricardo Zielinski	17 November 2022
Fénix	(Uruguay) Ignacio Pallas	End of contract	31 December 2022	Pre-season	(Uruguay) Damián Santín	17 November 2022
La Luz	(Uruguay) Julio Fuentes	Mutual agreement	17 February 2023	15th	(Uruguay) Federico Porto (Note: Caretaker manager.)	17 February 2023
La Luz	(Uruguay) Federico Porto	End of caretaker spell	20 February 2023	16th	(Uruguay) Ignacio Pallas	20 February 2023
Nacional	(Argentina) Ricardo Zielinski	Mutual agreement	19 March 2023	3rd	(Uruguay) Álvaro Gutiérrez	20 March 2023
Boston River	(Venezuela) Daniel Farías	Sacked	3 April 2023	14th	(Uruguay) Alejandro Apud	4 April 2023
Fénix	(Uruguay) Damián Santín	Sacked	3 April 2023	16th	(Uruguay) Leonel Rocco	4 April 2023
Cerro	(Uruguay) Danielo Núñez	Mutual agreement	4 April 2023	13th	(Uruguay) Gustavo Ferreyra (Note: Héctor Burguez was the caretaker manager for the Torneo Apertura 10th round match against Defensor Sporting.)	5 April 2023
Montevideo City Torque	(Uruguay) Ignacio Ithurralde	Sacked	10 April 2023	11th	(Argentina) Lucas Nardi	11 April 2023
Torneo Intermedio
Plaza Colonia	(Uruguay) Nicolás Vigneri	Mutual agreement	17 May 2023	Pre-tournament	(Uruguay) Adrián Fernández	22 May 2023
Peñarol	(Uruguay) Alfredo Arias	Sacked	18 June 2023	8th, Serie A	(Uruguay) Juan Manuel Olivera	19 June 2023
Peñarol	(Uruguay) Juan Manuel Olivera	End of caretaker spell	26 June 2023	8th, Serie A	(Uruguay) Darío Rodríguez	26 June 2023
Cerro Largo	(Uruguay) Eduardo Espinel	Resigned	2 July 2023	7th, Serie B	(Uruguay) Ignacio Ordóñez	3 July 2023
La Luz	(Uruguay) Ignacio Pallas	Sacked	25 July 2023	8th, Serie A	(Uruguay) Marcelo Russo	25 July 2023
River Plate	(Uruguay) Gustavo Díaz	Resigned	27 July 2023	6th, Serie A	(Uruguay) Ignacio Ithurralde	27 July 2023
Torneo Clausura
Danubio	(Uruguay) Esteban Conde	Sacked	26 August 2023	15th	(Uruguay) Mario Saralegui	28 August 2023
Plaza Colonia	(Uruguay) Adrián Fernández	Sacked	28 August 2023	14th	(Uruguay) Sebastián Díaz	28 August 2023
Montevideo City Torque	(Argentina) Lucas Nardi	Resigned	12 September 2023	8th	(Uruguay) Leonardo Ramos	13 September 2023
Racing	(Argentina) Gustavo Fermani	Return to the youth setup	14 September 2023	13th	(Uruguay) Eduardo Espinel	15 September 2023
Cerro	(Uruguay) Gustavo Ferreyra	Resigned	2 October 2023	16th	(Uruguay) Damián Santín	2 October 2023
Nacional	(Uruguay) Álvaro Gutiérrez	Mutual agreement	20 October 2023	6th	(Uruguay) Álvaro Recoba	20 October 2023
Peñarol	(Uruguay) Darío Rodríguez	Sacked	15 November 2023	2nd	(Uruguay) Juan Manuel Olivera	15 November 2023
Montevideo Wanderers	(Uruguay) Sergio Blanco	Resigned	15 November 2023	16th	(Uruguay) Alejandro Cappuccio	17 November 2023
Cerro Largo	(Uruguay) Ignacio Ordóñez	Sacked	16 November 2023	8th	(Uruguay) Juan Jacinto Rodríguez (Note: Caretaker manager until the end of the season)	16 November 2023
Peñarol	(Uruguay) Juan Manuel Olivera	End of caretaker spell	21 November 2023	3rd	(Uruguay) Diego Aguirre	21 November 2023

== Torneo Apertura ==
The Torneo Apertura, named "Julio César Morales", was the first tournament of the 2023 season. It began on 4 February 2023 and ended on 15 May 2023.

=== Standings ===
Pos	Team	Pld	W	D	L	GF	GA	GD	Pts	Qualification
1	Peñarol	15	10	4	1	25	11	+14	34	Qualification for Championship playoff
2	Nacional	15	8	5	2	28	11	+17	29	
3	Defensor Sporting	15	6	7	2	27	14	+13	25	
4	Cerro Largo	15	6	7	2	13	10	+3	25	
5	Liverpool	15	6	5	4	24	19	+5	23	
6	Montevideo Wanderers	15	6	5	4	16	12	+4	23	
7	River Plate	15	5	5	5	17	19	−2	20	
8	Deportivo Maldonado	15	5	5	5	18	23	−5	20	
9	La Luz (Note: Montevideo City Torque were awarded two points and La Luz were deducted one point due to La Luz fielding the ineligible player Álvaro González during the match between both teams.)	15	5	4	6	23	27	−4	18	
10	Cerro	15	3	7	5	12	15	−3	16	
11	Montevideo City Torque	15	3	5	7	15	24	−9	16	
12	Plaza Colonia	15	4	4	7	15	25	−10	16	
13	Danubio	15	3	6	6	20	19	+1	15	
14	Racing	15	3	6	6	13	17	−4	15	
15	Boston River	15	2	6	7	15	23	−8	12	
16	Fénix	15	3	3	9	11	23	−12	12	

Source: AUF, Soccerway
Rules for classification: 1) Points, 2) Playoff game, in case two teams are tied for first place.
If there are more than two teams tied in points: 2) Goal difference, 3) Goals for, 4) Head-to-head record, 5) Drawing of lots, 6) Playoff game, in case two teams are still tied for first place.

=== Results ===
Home \ Away	BOR	CRR	CRL	DAN	DFS	DMA	FEN	LLU	LIV	MCT	WAN	NAC	PEÑ	PCO	RAC	RIV
Boston River	—	0–3	—	3–3	1–0	—	—	—	1–3	—	0–1	—	—	1–1	—	0–0
Cerro	—	—	0–0	—	—	0–0	2–0	0–0	—	0–2	—	2–2	—	—	1–0	—
Cerro Largo	2–2	—	—	1–0	0–3	—	—	—	1–0	—	0–0	—	0–0	—	2–1	2–1
Danubio	—	1–0	—	—	1–1	4–0	—	—	1–1	—	0–2	0–0	—	5–0	—	—
Defensor Sporting	—	1–1	—	—	—	1–1	1–3	1–0	2–2	—	—	2–2	2–2	4–0	—	—
Deportivo Maldonado	3–2	—	0–0	—	—	—	2–0	—	—	3–2	—	0–0	—	—	1–1	—
Fénix	0–0	—	0–0	2–1	—	—	—	0–2	—	1–2	—	—	—	—	0–1	0–0
La Luz	2–1	—	0–3	3–1	—	4–2	—	—	—	1–1	1–3	—	3–4	—	1–3	2–2
Liverpool	2–0	1–1	—	—	—	4–2	3–1	2–3	—	1–0	—	—	1–0	3–1	—	—
Montevideo City Torque	1–1	—	1–2	1–1	0–3	—	—	—	—	—	0–1	0–4	—	—	0–2	1–1
Montevideo Wanderers	—	3–0	—	—	1–1	0–1	0–3	—	1–1	—	—	0–1	—	0–1	—	—
Nacional	3–1	—	0–0	—	—	—	4–0	3–0	2–1	—	—	—	—	—	3–1	3–0
Peñarol	1–0	2–0	—	2–0	—	2–1	2–0	—	—	2–2	1–1	2–0	—	—	—	1–0
Plaza Colonia	—	1–1	2–0	—	—	0–1	3–1	1–1	—	1–2	—	2–1	1–2	—	—	—
Racing	0–2	—	—	1–1	0–1	—	—	—	1–1	—	1–1	—	0–2	1–1	—	0–0
River Plate	—	3–2	—	2–1	0–4	3–1	—	—	2–0	—	1–2	—	—	2–0	—	—

Source: AUF, Soccerway
Legend: Blue = home team win; Yellow = draw; Red = away team win.

== Torneo Intermedio ==
The Torneo Intermedio, named "Omar Borrás", was the second tournament of the 2023 season, played between the Apertura and Clausura tournaments. It consists of two groups whose composition depends on the final standings of the Torneo Apertura: teams in odd-numbered positions play in Serie A, and teams in even-numbered positions play in Serie B. It started on 2 June and ended on 30 July, and the winners were granted a berth into the 2024 Copa Sudamericana and the 2024 Supercopa Uruguaya.

=== Serie A ===
Pos	Team	Pld	W	D	L	GF	GA	GD	Pts	Qualification	DFS	WAN	DAN	PEÑ	BOR	RIV	MCT	LLU
1	Defensor Sporting	7	4	2	1	11	5	+6	14	Advance to Torneo Intermedio Final	—	2–0	2–1	—	—	—	—	3–0
2	Montevideo Wanderers	7	3	3	1	10	6	+4	12		—	—	1–1	0–0	—	4–0	1–1	—
3	Danubio	7	3	2	2	6	4	+2	11		—	—	—	1–0	—	0–0	1–0	—
4	Peñarol	7	3	1	3	9	9	0	10		2–1	—	—	—	2–1	1–3	2–0	—
5	Boston River	7	3	0	4	8	7	+1	9		0–1	0–1	1–0	—	—	—	—	4–0
6	River Plate	7	2	3	2	5	7	−2	9		1–1	—	—	—	0–1	—	—	0–0
7	Montevideo City Torque	7	2	2	3	8	8	0	8		1–1	—	—	—	3–1	0–1	—	—
8	La Luz	7	1	1	5	6	17	−11	4		—	2–3	0–2	3–2	—	—	1–3	—

Source: AUF, Soccerway
Legend: Blue = home team win; Yellow = draw; Red = away team win.
Rules for classification: 1) Points, 2) Goal difference, 3) Goals for, 4) Head-to-head record, 5) Drawing of lots, 6) Playoff game, in case two teams are tied for first place.

=== Serie B ===
Pos	Team	Pld	W	D	L	GF	GA	GD	Pts	Qualification	LIV	CRR	NAC	RAC	FEN	CRL	DMA	PCO
1	Liverpool	7	5	1	1	15	8	+7	16	Advance to Torneo Intermedio Final	—	—	3–0	3–2	—	—	3–2	2–2
2	Cerro	7	3	3	1	6	4	+2	12		1–0	—	1–1	1–2	—	—	—	0–0
3	Nacional	7	3	2	2	12	8	+4	11		—	—	—	—	0–1	1–0	4–0	4–1
4	Racing	7	3	1	3	12	12	0	10		—	—	2–2	—	—	—	2–0	4–1
5	Fénix	7	2	3	2	7	5	+2	9		0–1	0–0	—	3–0	—	—	—	—
6	Cerro Largo	7	2	2	3	8	9	−1	8		1–3	0–1	—	2–0	2–1	—	—	—
7	Deportivo Maldonado	7	1	2	4	7	13	−6	5		—	1–2	—	—	1–1	0–0	—	—
8	Plaza Colonia	7	0	4	3	9	17	−8	4		—	—	—	—	1–1	3–3	1–3	—

Source: AUF, Soccerway
Legend: Blue = home team win; Yellow = draw; Red = away team win.
Rules for classification: 1) Points, 2) Goal difference, 3) Goals for, 4) Head-to-head record, 5) Drawing of lots, 6) Playoff game, in case two teams are tied for first place.

=== Torneo Intermedio Final ===
30 July 2023
16:00 UTC−3

Defensor Sporting	0–1	Liverpool
	Report	Izquierdo 84'

Parque Alfredo Víctor Viera, Montevideo
Referee: Javier Feres

== Torneo Clausura ==
The Torneo Clausura, named "Señor José Emilio Fernández", was the third and last tournament of the 2023 season. It began on 18 August and ended on 8 December 2023.

=== Standings ===
Pos	Team	Pld	W	D	L	GF	GA	GD	Pts	Qualification
1	Liverpool	15	11	2	2	23	8	+15	35	Qualification for Championship playoff
2	Peñarol	15	6	7	2	19	13	+6	25	
3	Racing	15	7	4	4	16	13	+3	25	
4	Nacional	15	6	6	3	20	17	+3	24	
5	Danubio	15	6	4	5	15	14	+1	22	
6	Defensor Sporting	15	6	3	6	19	13	+6	21	
7	Montevideo City Torque	15	6	3	6	21	20	+1	21	
8	Boston River	15	6	2	7	17	16	+1	20	
9	Plaza Colonia	15	4	7	4	13	15	−2	19	
10	River Plate	15	5	4	6	9	14	−5	19	
11	Deportivo Maldonado	15	5	3	7	14	19	−5	18	
12	Cerro Largo	15	4	5	6	14	17	−3	17	
13	Fénix	15	3	7	5	11	15	−4	16	
14	Cerro	15	3	6	6	12	15	−3	15	
15	Montevideo Wanderers	15	4	3	8	13	21	−8	15	
16	La Luz	15	3	4	8	13	19	−6	13	

Source: AUF, Soccerway
Rules for classification: 1) Points, 2) Playoff game, in case two teams are tied for first place.
If there are more than two teams tied in points: 2) Goal difference, 3) Goals for, 4) Head-to-head record, 5) Drawing of lots, 6) Playoff game, in case two teams are still tied for first place.

=== Results ===
Home \ Away	BOR	CRR	CRL	DAN	DFS	DMA	FEN	LLU	LIV	MCT	WAN	NAC	PEÑ	PCO	RAC	RIV
Boston River	—	—	0–1	—	—	2–0	1–1	1–2	—	2–0	—	2–0	0–1	—	1–0	—
Cerro	1–2	—	—	1–1	1–1	—	—	—	0–1	—	0–1	—	1–1	1–1	—	1–0
Cerro Largo	—	0–0	—	—	—	2–0	1–0	1–3	—	1–2	—	2–2	—	4–0	—	—
Danubio	1–1	—	2–0	—	—	—	0–0	2–1	—	0–1	—	—	2–1	—	0–2	0–0
Defensor Sporting	2–0	—	2–0	0–2	—	—	—	—	—	2–0	3–0	—	—	—	3–0	0–1
Deportivo Maldonado	—	2–1	—	1–2	2–1	—	—	1–0	0–2	—	3–0	—	0–1	0–0	—	0–0
Fénix	—	1–1	—	—	1–1	1–0	—	—	1–0	—	1–1	1–1	0–1	1–4	—	—
La Luz	—	1–2	—	—	1–1	—	0–2	—	0–2	—	—	0–1	—	1–1	—	—
Liverpool	2–0	—	3–0	1–0	2–0	—	—	—	—	—	2–1	0–0	—	—	2–3	2–1
Montevideo City Torque	—	1–0	—	—	—	5–1	1–1	1–0	2–3	—	—	—	2–3	2–2	—	—
Montevideo Wanderers	0–2	—	1–1	3–0	—	—	—	0–1	—	2–1	—	—	0–0	—	1–2	2–1
Nacional	—	2–1	—	1–3	1–0	1–3	—	—	—	1–1	3–1	—	2–2	0–0	—	—
Peñarol	—	—	1–1	—	2–1	—	—	2–2	0–1	—	—	—	—	0–0	1–1	—
Plaza Colonia	3–2	—	—	1–0	0–2	—	—	—	0–0	—	1–0	—	—	—	0–1	0–1
Racing	—	0–1	1–0	—	—	1–1	2–0	1–1	—	1–0	—	1–2	—	—	—	—
River Plate	2–1	—	0–0	—	—	—	1–0	1–0	—	1–2	—	0–3	0–3	—	0–0	—

Source: AUF, Soccerway
Legend: Blue = home team win; Yellow = draw; Red = away team win.

== Aggregate table ==
Pos	Team	Pld	W	D	L	GF	GA	GD	Pts	Qualification
1	Liverpool (C)	37	22	8	7	62	35	+27	74	Qualification for Championship playoff and Copa Libertadores group stage
2	Peñarol	37	19	12	6	53	33	+20	69	Qualification for Championship playoff and Copa Libertadores group stage
3	Nacional	37	17	13	7	60	36	+24	64	Qualification for Copa Libertadores second stage
4	Defensor Sporting	37	16	12	9	56	31	+25	60	Qualification for Copa Libertadores first stage
5	Montevideo Wanderers	37	13	11	13	39	39	0	50	Qualification for Copa Sudamericana first stage
6	Racing	37	13	11	13	41	42	−1	50	Qualification for Copa Sudamericana first stage
7	Cerro Largo	37	12	14	11	35	36	−1	50	Qualification for Copa Sudamericana first stage
8	Danubio	37	12	12	13	41	37	+4	48	Qualification for Copa Sudamericana first stage
9	River Plate	37	12	12	13	31	40	−9	48	
10	Montevideo City Torque (Note: Montevideo City Torque were awarded two points and La Luz were deducted one point due to La Luz fielding the ineligible player Álvaro González during the Torneo Apertura match between both teams.)	37	11	10	16	44	52	−8	45	
11	Cerro	37	9	16	12	30	34	−4	43	
12	Deportivo Maldonado	37	11	10	16	39	55	−16	43	
13	Boston River	37	11	8	18	40	46	−6	41	
14	Plaza Colonia	37	8	15	14	37	57	−20	39	
15	Fénix	37	8	13	16	29	43	−14	37	
16	La Luz	37	9	9	19	42	63	−21	35	

Source: AUF
Rules for classification: 1) Points, 2) Playoff game, in case two teams are tied for first place.
If there are more than two teams tied in points: 2) Goal difference, 3) Goals for, 4) Head-to-head record, 5) Drawing of lots, 6) Playoff game, in case two teams are still tied for first place.
(C) Champions

== Championship playoff ==
Semi-final		Finals
		Liverpool (Aggregate table first place)	2	1	3
Liverpool (Clausura winners)	0	Peñarol (Semi-final winners)	0	0	0
Peñarol (Apertura winners) (a.e.t.)	1

=== Semi-final ===
9 December 2023
19:30 UTC−3

Liverpool	0–1 (a.e.t.)	Peñarol
	Report	Hernández 119'

Estadio Centenario, Montevideo
Referee: Mathías de Armas

=== Finals ===
13 December 2023
17:00 UTC−3

Liverpool	2–0	Peñarol
Vecino 70'; Bentancourt 81'	Report

Estadio Belvedere, Montevideo
Referee: Esteban Ostojich

16 December 2023
19:00 UTC−3

Peñarol	0–1	Liverpool
	Report	Bentancourt 26'

Estadio Campeón del Siglo, Montevideo
Referee: Andrés Matonte

Liverpool won 3–0 on aggregate.

Primera División
2023 Champions
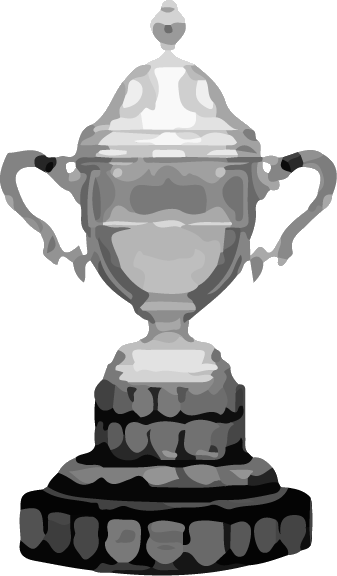

1st title

== Top scorers ==
Rank	Player	Club	Goals
1	(Uruguay) Ignacio Ramírez	Nacional	19
2	(Uruguay) Matías Arezo	Peñarol	18
3	(Nigeria) Christian Ebere	Plaza Colonia	17
4	(Uruguay) Rubén Bentancourt	Liverpool	13
5	(Uruguay) Abel Hernández	Peñarol	12
6	(Uruguay) Agustín Ocampo	Fénix	11
7	(Uruguay) Nicolás Siri	Montevideo City Torque	10
8	(Uruguay) Guillermo May	Danubio	9
8	(Argentina) Tiago Palacios	Montevideo City Torque	9
8	(Uruguay) Nicolás Schiappacasse	La Luz	9

Source: AUF

== Relegation ==
Relegation is determined at the end of the season by computing an average of the number of points earned per game over the two most recent seasons: 2022 and 2023. The three teams with the lowest average at the end of the season were relegated to the Segunda División for the following season.

Pos	Team	2022 Pts	2023 Pts	Total Pts	Total Pld	Avg	Relegation
1	Liverpool	74	74	148	74	2	
2	Nacional	81	64	145	74	1.959	
3	Peñarol	59	69	128	74	1.73	
4	Defensor Sporting	58	60	118	74	1.595	
5	River Plate	60	48	108	74	1.459	
6	Deportivo Maldonado	63	43	106	74	1.432	
7	Danubio	56	48	104	74	1.405	
8	Boston River	62	41	103	74	1.392	
9	Montevideo Wanderers	51	50	101	74	1.365	
10	Racing	—	50	50	37	1.351	
11	Cerro Largo	40	50	90	74	1.216	
12	Cerro	—	43	43	37	1.162	
13	Fénix	49	37	86	74	1.162	
14	Montevideo City Torque (R)	36	45	81	74	1.095	Relegation to Segunda División
15	Plaza Colonia (R)	35	39	74	74	1	Relegation to Segunda División
16	La Luz (R)	—	35	35	37	0.946	Relegation to Segunda División

== Season awards ==
On 1 February 2024 the AUF announced the winners of the season awards, who were chosen by its Technical Staff based on voting by managers and captains of the 16 Primera División teams as well as a group of local sports journalists. 36 players were nominated for the Public's Player and Team of the Season awards according to their ratings and evaluations by the Technical Staff throughout the season.

Award	Winner	Club
Best Player	(Uruguay) Federico Pereira	Liverpool
Public's Player (Note: Chosen by public voting on the competition's social network accounts.)	(Uruguay) Matías Arezo	Peñarol
Youth Talent	(Uruguay) Luciano Rodríguez	Liverpool
Best Manager	(Uruguay) Jorge Bava	Liverpool
Best Goal	(Uruguay) Abel Hernández (against Plaza Colonia, Torneo Apertura Round 12)	Peñarol
Best Save	(Uruguay) Sebastián Britos (against Peñarol, Finals 1st leg)	Liverpool
Best Newcomer	(Uruguay) Mateo Antoni	Liverpool
Top Scorer	(Uruguay) Ignacio Ramírez (18 goals in 34 games played)	Nacional
Least beaten goal in regular season	Defensor Sporting (31 goals conceded)	
Most minutes on field	(Uruguay) Mauricio Silveira (3,330 minutes in 37 games played)	Montevideo Wanderers
Fair Play Award	Deportivo Maldonado	
Best Referee	Mathías de Armas	
Best Assistant Referee	Agustín Berisso	

Team of the Season
Goalkeeper	Defenders	Midfielders	Forwards	Bench
(Uruguay) Sebastián Britos (Liverpool)	(Uruguay) Juan Pintado (Defensor Sporting) (Uruguay) Federico Pereira (Liverpool) (Uruguay) Juan Izquierdo (Liverpool) (Paraguay) Miguel Samudio (Liverpool)	(Uruguay) Marcelo Meli (Liverpool) (Uruguay) Sebastián Rodríguez (Peñarol) (Uruguay) Alan Medina (Liverpool)	(Uruguay) Luciano Rodríguez (Liverpool) (Uruguay) Ignacio Ramírez (Nacional) (Uruguay) Matías Arezo (Peñarol)	(Uruguay) Mauro Goicoechea (Danubio) (Uruguay) Mateo Antoni (Liverpool) (Uruguay) Mauro Brasil (Cerro Largo) (Uruguay) Nicolás Fonseca (Montevideo Wanderers) (Uruguay) Tiago Palacios (Montevideo City Torque) (Uruguay) Rubén Bentancourt (Liverpool) (Uruguay) Thiago Vecino (Liverpool)

== See also ==
- 2023 Uruguayan Segunda División season
- 2023 Copa Uruguay
