= Dylan Nandín =

Uruguayan footballer

Personal information
- Full name: Dylan Alexander Nandín Berrutti
- Date of birth: 28 February 2002 (age 24)
- Place of birth: Montevideo, Uruguay
- Height: 1.81 m (5 ft 11 in)
- Position: Forward

Team information
- Current team: Arouca
- Number: 23

Senior career*
Years	Team	Apps	(Gls)
2021–2023	Cerro	61	(6)
2024–2025	Racing Club de Montevideo	34	(11)
2025	→ Arouca (loan)	15	(3)
2025–	Arouca	21	(1)

International career^{‡}
2023	Uruguay U23	4	(0)
- * Club domestic league appearances and goals as of 25 May 2026 ‡ National team caps and goals as of 20:54, 6 August 2024 (UTC)

Dylan Alexander Nandín Berrutti (born 28 February 2002) is a Uruguayan footballer who plays as a forward for Primeira Liga club Arouca.

== Career ==
=== Cerro ===
Born in Montevideo, Nandín was raised by a fishmonger father and a hospital cleaner mother. He grew up two blocks from Cerro's Estadio Luis Tróccoli and began playing football at age five. He played for the youth team Covicenova and attracted the attention of former Cerro and Peñarol player Néstor Blanco, who recruited him for Cerro's academy and moved his position from defensive midfielder to centre forward.

In Cerro's youth team, Nandín scored twice in a 2–2 comeback draw against Nacional, as well as goals against Peñarol, Liverpool Montevideo and Defensor Sporting. He signed his first professional contract in July 2020 and received his first-team debut on 7 February 2021 in a 2–0 home win over Progreso, playing the final eight minutes as a substitute for Maicol Cabrera. On 29 March, he broke his fifth metatarsal in a 1–1 draw with Montevideo Wanderers on the final day of the season as his team were relegated; he recovered three months later.

On 3 November 2021, Nandín scored the 2–1 winner in added time in a victory at Uruguay Montevideo. After missing the playoffs in the Uruguayan Segunda División that season, the team were promoted in 2022, with Nandín assisting the only goal by Emiliano Sosa in the playoff final against local rivals Rampla Juniors, allowing their team to be back in the Uruguayan Primera División for their centenary. In 2023, he scored four top-flight goals, including in 1–1 draws at home to Peñarol and Nacional.

=== Racing Club Montevideo ===
On 9 January 2024, Nandín was released by Cerro, and signed the next day for Racing Club de Montevideo. On his debut on 18 February, he scored twice in a 2–2 home draw with Liverpool Montevideo. In all competitions in his first year, he played 45 games and scored 13 goals, with one assist.

=== Arouca ===
Nandín was loaned to F.C. Arouca of the Portuguese Primeira Liga on 6 January 2025, with the option to purchase for €1 million. He made his debut 12 days later in a 2–2 draw away to Vitória de Guimarães, as a 58th-minute substitute. On 11 June 2025, Nandín joined Arouca on a permanent deal, signing a three-year contract, for a club-record fee of €1.4 million.

== International career ==
Nandín played for the Uruguay national under-23 football team in the 2023 Pan American Games in Chile.
