= 2000 Liga Deportiva Universitaria de Quito season =

LDU Quito
2000 season
- President: Darío Ávila
- Manager: Manuel Pellegrini; Édgar Ospina; Fernando Díaz
- Stadium: Estadio Casa Blanca
- Serie A: 9th
- Copa Libertadores: First Stage
- Top goalscorer: League: Giovanni Córdova (10 goals); All: Giovanni Córdova (12 goals)
Home colours	Away colours

Liga Deportiva Universitaria de Quito's 2000 season was the club's 70th year of existence, the 47th year in professional football, and the 40th in the top level of professional football in Ecuador.

== Kits ==
Supplier: Umbro
Sponsor(s): Parmalat, Ecuatoriana

== Squad ==
No.	Pos.	Nation	Player
—	GK	ECU	Jacinto Espinoza (captain)
—	GK	ECU	Bonard García
—	GK	ECU	Víctor Sánchez
—	DF	ECU	Luis Capurro
—	DF	ECU	Darío Chalá
—	DF	ECU	Mario Chillagana
—	DF	ECU	Geovanny Cumbicus
—	DF	ECU	Ulises de la Cruz
—	DF	ECU	Santiago Jácome
—	DF	URU	José Puente
—	DF	ECU	Néicer Reasco
—	DF	ECU	Jorge Vargas
—	MF	ECU	Paúl Ambrosi
—	MF	ECU	Jorge Benalcázar
—	MF	ECU	Nixon Carcelén

No.	Pos.	Nation	Player
—	MF	COL	James Cardona
—	MF	ECU	José Chávez
—	MF	COL	Álex Escobar
—	MF	ECU	Luis González
—	MF	ECU	Juan Guamán
—	MF	ECU	Camilo Hurtado
—	MF	ECU	Líder Mejía
—	MF	ECU	Alfonso Obregón
—	FW	COL	Giovanni Córdova
—	FW	COL	Jorge Díaz
—	FW	ECU	Eduardo Hurtado
—	FW	ECU	Patricio Hurtado
—	FW	ECU	Max Mecías
—	FW	ECU	Jonathan Navarro
—	FW	ECU	Franklin Salas

== Competitions ==
=== Serie A ===
==== First stage ====
Pos	Team	Pld	W	D	L	GF	GA	GD	Pts	Qualification
1	Olmedo	18	8	6	4	18	14	+4	30	Qualified to the Liguilla Final
2	Aucas	18	8	5	5	20	17	+3	29	Qualified to the Liguilla Final
3	El Nacional	18	7	6	5	34	26	+8	27	Qualified to the Liguilla Final
4	LDU Quito	18	7	6	5	30	23	+7	27	
5	Macará	18	6	7	5	25	25	0	25	
6	Emelec	18	7	3	8	23	22	+1	24	
7	ESPOLI	18	6	6	6	19	20	−1	24	
8	Deportivo Quito	18	4	8	6	24	24	0	20	
9	Barcelona	18	4	7	7	19	27	−8	19	
10	Técnico Universitario	18	3	6	9	21	35	−14	15	

Source: RSSSF
Rules for classification: 1) points; 2) goal difference; 3) number of goals scored.

===== Results =====
Home \ Away	SDA	BSC	SDQ	EN	CSE	CDE	LDU	MAC	CDO	TU
Aucas							0–1			
Barcelona							0–0			
Deportivo Quito							2–1			
El Nacional							2–1			
Emelec							2–0			
ESPOLI							0–0			
LDU Quito	2–0	2–0	2–1	4–1	4–1	3–3		2–2	1–1	3–1
Macará							2–0			
Olmedo							1–0			
Técnico Universitario							4–4			

Source: LDU 2000
Legend: Blue = home team win; Yellow = draw; Red = away team win.

==== Second stage ====
Pos	Team	Pld	W	D	L	GF	GA	GD	Pts	Qualification
1	Emelec	18	10	2	6	36	25	+11	32	Qualified to the Liguilla Final
2	El Nacional	18	10	3	5	34	24	+10	30 (Note: El Nacional had three points deducted for fielding an ineligible player in Round 16.)	Qualified to the Liguilla Final
3	Barcelona	18	8	5	5	25	17	+8	29	Qualified to the Liguilla Final
4	ESPOLI	18	8	4	6	24	16	+8	28	
5	Deportivo Quito	18	8	4	6	28	25	+3	28	
6	Macará	18	8	2	8	25	25	0	26	
7	Aucas	18	6	5	7	22	26	−4	23	
8	Olmedo	18	6	4	8	15	21	−6	22	
9	LDU Quito	18	5	5	8	20	24	−4	20	
10	Técnico Universitario	18	3	2	13	21	47	−26	11	

Source: RSSSF
Rules for classification: 1) points; 2) goal difference; 3) number of goals scored.

===== Results =====
Home \ Away	SDA	BSC	SDQ	EN	CSE	CDE	LDU	MAC	CDO	TU
Aucas							1–1			
Barcelona							1–0			
Deportivo Quito							2–1			
El Nacional							2–2			
Emelec							2–0			
ESPOLI							0–0			
LDU Quito	0–2	2–1	0–1	2–4	3–0	1–1		2–0	3–3	2–1
Macará							0–1			
Olmedo							2–0			
Técnico Universitario							1–0			

Source: LDU 2000
Legend: Blue = home team win; Yellow = draw; Red = away team win.

==== Aggregate table ====
Pos	Team	Pld	W	D	L	GF	GA	GD	Pts	Qualification or relegation
1	El Nacional	36	17	9	10	68	50	+18	57 (Note: El Nacional had three points deducted for fielding an ineligible player in Round 16 of the Second Stage.)	
2	Emelec	36	17	5	14	59	47	+12	56	
3	ESPOLI	36	14	10	12	43	36	+7	52	Qualified to the Liguilla Final (Note: Since El Nacional qualified to the Liguilla Final twice, ESPOLI qualified to the last spot in the Liguilla Final as the best non-top-three finisher in the aggregate table.)
4	Aucas	36	14	10	12	42	43	−1	52	
5	Olmedo	36	14	10	12	33	35	−2	52	
6	Macará	36	14	9	13	50	50	0	51	
7	Deportivo Quito	36	12	12	12	52	49	+3	48	
8	Barcelona	36	12	12	12	44	45	−1	48	
9	LDU Quito	36	12	11	13	50	47	+3	47	Relegation to Serie B
10	Técnico Universitario	36	6	8	22	42	82	−40	26	Relegation to Serie B

Source: RSSSF
Rules for classification: 1) points; 2) goal difference; 3) number of goals scored.

=== Copa Libertadores ===
==== Copa Libertadores squad ====
No.	Pos.	Nation	Player
1	GK	ECU	Jacinto Espinoza (captain)
2	DF	URU	José Puente
3	DF	ECU	Santiago Jácome
4	DF	ECU	Ulises de la Cruz
5	MF	ECU	Alfonso Obregón
6	MF	ECU	Juan Guamán
7	FW	COL	Giovanni Córdova
8	MF	ECU	Nixon Carcelén
9	FW	ECU	Patricio Hurtado
10	MF	COL	Alex Escobar
12	GK	ECU	Víctor Sánchez
13	DF	ECU	Néicer Reasco

No.	Pos.	Nation	Player
14	DF	ECU	Luis Capurro
15	MF	ECU	Luis González
16	MF	COL	James Cardona
17	DF	ECU	Mario Chillagana
18	MF	ECU	Líder Mejía
19	FW	ECU	Franklin Salas
20	MF	ECU	Jorge Benalcázar
21	MF	ECU	Paúl Ambrosi
23	MF	ECU	Camilo Hurtado
24	DF	ECU	Geovanny Cumbicus
25	FW	ECU	Jonathan Navarro

Overall								Home						Away					
Pld	W	D	L	GF	GA	GD	Pts	W	D	L	GF	GA	GD	W	D	L	GF	GA	GD
6	0	2	4	3	13	−10	2	0	1	2	2	5	−3	0	1	2	1	8	−7

==== First stage ====
Pos	Team	Pld	W	D	L	GF	GA	GD	Pts	Qualification
1	(Brazil) Corinthians	6	4	1	1	17	9	+8	13	Round of 16
2	(Mexico) América	6	3	1	2	15	9	+6	10	Round of 16
3	(Paraguay) Olimpia	6	2	2	2	13	17	−4	8	
4	(Ecuador) LDU Quito	6	0	2	4	3	13	−10	2	

February 22 First Stage	LDU Quito (Ecuador)	0–1	(Paraguay) Olimpia	Quito, Ecuador
		Report	Quintana 84'	Stadium: Estadio Casa Blanca; Referee: Óscar Ruiz (Colombia)

March 3 First Stage	Corinthians (Brazil)	6–0	(Ecuador) LDU Quito	São Paulo, Brazil
	Marcelinho 12' (pen.); Luizão 20', 50', 70'; Capurro 52' (o.g.); Dinei 72'	Report		Stadium: Pacaembu Stadium; Referee: Ricardo Grance (Paraguay)

March 14 First Stage	América (Mexico)	1–0	(Ecuador) LDU Quito	Mexico City, Mexico
	Calderón 18'	Report		Stadium: Estadio Azteca; Referee: Guido Aros (Chile)

April 5 First Stage	Olimpia (Paraguay)	1–1	(Ecuador) LDU Quito	Asunción, Paraguay
	Paredes 79'	Report	Capurro 66'	Stadium: Estadio Defensores del Chaco; Referee: Mario Sánchez Yantén (Chile)

April 11 First Stage	LDU Quito (Ecuador)	0–2	(Brazil) Corinthians	Quito, Ecuador
16:00 UTC−05:00		Report	Luizão 18'; Dinei 89'	Stadium: Estadio Casa Blanca; Referee: Luis Solórzano (Venezuela)

April 19 First Stage	LDU Quito (Ecuador)	2–2	(Mexico) América	Quito, Ecuador
	Córdova 64', 78'	Report	Pardo 50'; Calderón 60'	Stadium: Estadio Casa Blanca; Referee: John Toro Rendón (Colombia)
