= Santiago Ramírez =

Santiago Ramírez may refer to:

- Santiago María Ramírez Ruíz de Dulanto (theologian) (1891–1967), Spanish Dominican friar
- Santiago Ramírez (baseball) (born 1978), Dominican baseball pitcher
- Santiago Ramírez (cyclist) (born 1994), Colombian track cyclist
- Santiago Ramírez (footballer, born 1998), Uruguayan football forward
- Santiago Ramírez (footballer, born 2001), Uruguayan football forward
