= Juan Ramón Tejera =

Uruguayan footballer and manager (born 1956)

Juan Tejera
Personal information
- Full name: Juan Ramón Tejera Pérez
- Date of birth: 23 February 1956 (age 70)
- Place of birth: Montevideo, Uruguay
- Position: Midfielder

Youth career
- Leo FC
- Danubio

Senior career*
Years	Team	Apps	(Gls)
- Danubio

Managerial career
- 1994–1997: Defensor Sporting (youth)
- 1996: Defensor Sporting (interim)
- 1997: Liverpool Montevideo
- 1998: Defensor Sporting (youth)
- 1999–2000: Liverpool Montevideo
- 2002–2003: Defensor Sporting (youth)
- 2004–2005: Defensor Sporting
- 2006–2007: Liverpool Montevideo
- 2007: Rentistas
- 2013: Racing Montevideo
- 2013–2014: Fénix
- 2014: Cerro
- 2015–2016: Defensor Sporting
- 2018–2019: Racing Montevideo
- 2020–2021: Boston River
- * Club domestic league appearances and goals

Juan Ramón Tejera Pérez (born 23 February 1956) is a Uruguayan football manager and former player who played as a midfielder.

== Career ==
Born in Montevideo, Tejera started out at local amateur sides, and was also a part of Danubio squad in 1977 which first reached the Copa Libertadores in the club's history. Shortly before his retirement (which occurred in 1990), he started studying to become a coach, and joined Defensor Sporting's youth setup in 1994.

Tejera's first managerial experience occurred in 1996, as he was interim manager of Defensor. He was manager of Liverpool Montevideo during the 1997 season, but returned to Defensor in 1998 as manager of their reserve team.

Tejera returned to Liverpool for the 1999 season, but left in January 2000. He returned to Defensor and their youth categories in 2002, and became the club's first team manager in May; with the club in a poor run of form, Tejera recovered the club's form and qualified them to a continental competition after four years.

Tejera resigned in October 2005, and rejoined Liverpool for a third spell in July 2006, replacing Voltaire García. He left the latter club in 2007, and subsequently worked for a short period at Rentistas.

Tejera then spent some time away from football, working at the Administración Nacional de Puertos. On 6 January 2013, he returned to managerial duties after being named in charge of Racing Montevideo. In June, he was replaced by Rosario Martínez, and took over Fénix on 28 October.

Tejera left Fénix in June 2014, as his contract expired, and was named Cerro manager on 8 September. He resigned on 25 November, and returned to Defensor the following 30 June.

Tejera resigned from Defensor on 15 February 2016, and stayed two years without a club before returning to Racing on 13 August 2018. He opted to leave the club the following June, as his contract was due to expire.

On 11 November 2020, after another year of inactivity, Tejera replaced player-manager Sebastián Abreu at the helm of Boston River. He was sacked the following 23 June, with only four points in nine matches into the new season.
