= Gustavo Fermani =

Argentine football manager (born 1969)

Personal information
- Full name: Gustavo Hugo Fermani
- Date of birth: 14 January 1969 (age 57)
- Place of birth: Buenos Aires, Argentina

Team information
- Current team: Barcelona Sporting Club (sporting director)

Managerial career
- Years: Team
- 2006–2010: River Plate (youth)
- 2014–2019: River Plate (youth)
- 2020–2021: River Plate (reserves)
- 2023: Racing Montevideo
- 2023–2024: Racing Montevideo (youth)

Gustavo Hugo Fermani (born 14 January 1969) is an Argentine football manager. He is the current sporting director of Colombian club Atlético Nacional.

== Career ==
Fermani started working as a youth coach at River Plate in 2006, before leaving in 2010 due to the club's change of presidency. He returned in late 2013, and was appointed manager of their reserve squad in December 2019, along with Juan José Borrelli.

Fermani and Borrelli left their role as manager of River's reserve team in December 2021, after first team manager Marcelo Gallardo opted to appoint Jonathan La Rosa in charge. While Borrelli remained at River in another role, Fermani opted to leave the club.

Shortly after leaving River, Fermani joined Racing Montevideo in Uruguay as a youth coordinator. On 16 November 2022, he replaced Damián Santín at the helm of the first team in the Primera División.

On 14 September 2023, Fermani returned to Racing's youth sides, being replaced by Eduardo Espinel.
