= Agustín Miranda =

Agustín Miranda may refer to:

- Agustín Miranda (footballer, born 1930), Paraguayan football defender
- Agustín Miranda (footballer, born 1992), Uruguayan football midfielder
