= Sebastian Díaz =

Sebastian Díaz may refer to:

- Sebastian Díaz (footballer, born 1983), Uruguayan football centre-back
- Sebastián Díaz (footballer, born 1996), Chilean football defensive midfielder
- Sebastian Diaz, a character from Call of Duty: Black Ops III
