= Ignacio Ithurralde =

Uruguayan footballer (born 1983)

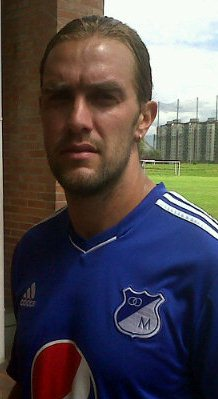
- Ithurralde with Millonarios in 2012

Personal information
- Full name: Ignacio Ithurralde Sáez
- Date of birth: 30 May 1983 (age 43)
- Place of birth: Montevideo, Uruguay
- Height: 1.86 m (6 ft 1 in)
- Position: Centre back

Senior career*
Years	Team	Apps	(Gls)
2002–2007	Defensor Sporting	83	(7)
2007	Monterrey	8	(0)
2008	Olimpo	12	(0)
2008	Rosario Central	4	(0)
2009	Peñarol	17	(1)
2010	Bolívar	35	(1)
2011	Guaraní	2	(0)
2011	Audax Italiano	6	(0)
2012–2013	Millonarios	23	(1)
2013	Rentistas	14	(0)
2014	Blooming	14	(0)
2014–2015	Rentistas	21	(2)
2015–2017	Racing Montevideo	33	(2)
2017	Deportivo Maldonado	12	(1)
2017	Cerro	9	(0)

International career
- Uruguay U17
2003	Uruguay U20	4	(0)
2006–2007	Uruguay	2	(0)

Managerial career
- 2020–2021: Defensor Sporting (youth)
- 2021–2022: Boston River
- 2023: Montevideo City Torque
- 2023–2024: River Plate Montevideo
- 2025: Defensor Sporting
- 2026: Boston River
- * Club domestic league appearances and goals

Ignacio "Nacho" Ithurralde Sáez (born 30 May 1983 in Durazno) is a Uruguayan football manager and former player who played as a centre back.

== Playing career ==
=== Club ===
Ithurralde began his playing career in 2002 with Defensor Sporting where he spent 5 years. He played in Mexico with CF Monterrey in 2007 and then in Argentina with Olimpo and Rosario Central.

In 2009, Ithurralde returned to Uruguay to play for Peñarol, and moved to Bolívar in the Liga de Fútbol Profesional Boliviano next year. In 2011, he had a brief spell with Paraguayan club Guaraní before moving to Chile to play for Audax Italiano. He moved to Millonarios FC in the Colombian Primera A in January 2012. The following year he was repatriated by club Rentistas. In 2014 Ithuarralde had a short spell with Bolivian side Blooming before returning to Rentistas later that year.

Ithurralde subsequently represented Racing Montevideo and Deportivo Maldonado before retiring with Cerro in 2017.

=== International ===
After representing Uruguay at under-17 and under-20 levels, Ithurralde made his debut with the full side on 27 September 2006, in a 1–0 friendly loss against Venezuela.

== Managerial career ==
In 2020, Ithurralde returned to his first club Defensor as a manager of the youth sides. On 23 June 2021, he replaced Juan Tejera at the helm of Boston River in the top tier.

Ithurralde qualified Boston River to the 2023 Copa Libertadores, the club's first-ever participation in the tournament, but still left on 4 November 2022. He was named in charge of Montevideo City Torque seventeen days later, but was sacked the following 10 April.

On 27 July 2023, Ithurralde replaced Gustavo Díaz at the helm of River Plate Montevideo. He was sacked from the club on 15 June of the following year.

On 31 March 2025, Ithurralde returned to Defensor, now as first team manager. He left on 12 November, after the club opted not to renew his contract, and returned to Boston River on 17 March 2026.

Ithurralde was sacked by Boston River on 19 September 2026.
