= Ignacio Ramírez (footballer) =

Uruguayan footballer (born 1997)

Personal information
- Full name: Juan Ignacio Ramírez Polero
- Date of birth: 1 February 1997 (age 29)
- Place of birth: Mercedes, Uruguay
- Height: 1.79 m (5 ft 10 in)
- Position: Forward

Team information
- Current team: Newell's Old Boys
- Number: 99

Youth career
- Club Ascencio de Mercedes
- Sud América de Mercedes
- Liverpool Montevideo

Senior career*
Years	Team	Apps	(Gls)
2016–2022	Liverpool Montevideo	155	(81)
2021–2022	→ Saint-Étienne (loan)	5	(0)
2021–2022	→ Saint-Étienne II (loan)	1	(1)
2022	→ Nacional (loan)	24	(5)
2023	Nacional	34	(19)
2024–	Newell's Old Boys	49	(16)
2025	→ Everton (loan)	12	(2)
2025	→ Sport Recife (loan)	8	(0)

International career
2015	Uruguay U18	4	(0)
2016	Uruguay U20	7	(1)
2019	Uruguay U22	5	(1)
2020	Uruguay U23	8	(2)
- * Club domestic league appearances and goals as of 17:33, 8 May 2026 (UTC)

Juan Ignacio Ramírez Polero (born 1 February 1997) is a Uruguayan professional footballer who plays as a forward for Argentine Primera División club Newell's Old Boys.

== Club career ==
A youth academy graduate of Liverpool Montevideo, Ramírez made his senior team debut on 21 February 2016 in a 3–1 league defeat against Juventud. He scored his first goal on 12 March 2017 in a 3–1 league defeat against Boston River.

On 31 August 2021, Ramírez joined French club Saint-Étienne on a season long loan deal.

In January 2025, Ramírez joined Chilean club Everton on loan from Argentine club Newell's Old Boys on a one-year deal.

== International career ==
Ramírez is a former Uruguay youth international. He was part of Uruguay squad which reached semi-finals at the 2019 Pan American Games. On 29 December 2019, Uruguay under-23 team head coach Gustavo Ferreyra named Ramírez in 23-man final squad for 2020 CONMEBOL Pre-Olympic Tournament.

In May 2021, Ramírez received his first call-up to the senior team for FIFA World Cup qualifying matches against Paraguay and Venezuela.

== Personal life ==
Ramírez is the elder brother of footballer Santiago Ramírez.

== Career statistics ==
As of 30 January 2023

Appearances and goals by club, season and competition
Club	Season	League			Cup		Continental		Other		Total	
Club	Season	Division	Apps	Goals	Apps	Goals	Apps	Goals	Apps	Goals	Apps	Goals
Liverpool Montevideo	2015–16	Uruguayan Primera División	9	0	—		—		—		9	0
Liverpool Montevideo	2016	Uruguayan Primera División	8	0	—		—		—		8	0
Liverpool Montevideo	2017	Uruguayan Primera División	30	12	—		1 (Note: Appearance(s) in Copa Sudamericana.)	1	—		31	13
Liverpool Montevideo	2018	Uruguayan Primera División	35	11	—		—		—		35	11
Liverpool Montevideo	2019	Uruguayan Primera División	33	23	—		4	1	1 (Note: Appearance in Torneo Intermedio final.)	1	38	25
Liverpool Montevideo	2020	Uruguayan Primera División	30	24	—		2	1	1 (Note: Appearance in Primera División championship playoff.)	0	33	25
Liverpool Montevideo	2021	Uruguayan Primera División	10	11	—		2 (Note: Appearances in Copa Libertadores.)	0	—		12	11
Liverpool Montevideo	Total		155	81	0	0	9	3	2	1	166	85
Saint-Étienne (loan)	2021–22	Ligue 1	5	0	1	0	—		—		6	0
Saint-Étienne II (loan)	2021–22	Championnat National 3	1	1	—		—		—		1	1
Nacional (loan)	2022	Uruguayan Primera División	24	5	2	1	6 (Note: Three appearances in Copa Libertadores, three appearances and one goal in Copa Sudamericana.)	1	2 (Note: One appearance each in Torneo Intermedio final and championship playoff.)	0	34	7
Nacional	2023	Uruguayan Primera División	0	0	0	0	0	0	1 (Note: Appearance in Supercopa Uruguaya.)	0	1	0
Career total			185	87	3	1	15	4	5	1	208	93

== Honours ==
Nacional

- Uruguayan Primera División: 2022

Individual

- Uruguayan Primera División Team of the Year: 2019, 2020, 2023
- Uruguayan Primera División top scorer: 2023
