= Sebastián Britos =

Uruguayan footballer (born 1988)

Personal information
- Full name: Sebastián Javier Britos Rodríguez
- Date of birth: 2 January 1988 (age 38)
- Place of birth: Minas, Uruguay
- Height: 1.90 m (6 ft 3 in)
- Position: Goalkeeper

Team information
- Current team: Peñarol
- Number: 12

Youth career
- –2009: Club Atlético Las Delicias

Senior career*
Years	Team	Apps	(Gls)
2010–2011	Bella Vista	23	(0)
2012	Montevideo Wanderers	4	(0)
2012–2013	Oriente Petrolero	14	(0)
2013–2015	Liverpool Montevideo	10	(0)
2015	Cortuluá	11	(0)
2015–2017	CA Cerro	17	(0)
2017	→ Tanque Sisley (loan)	16	(0)
2018–2019	Juventud	41	(0)
2019–2020	Atlante	9	(0)
2020	Rocha F.C.	0	(0)
2020	Central Español	7	(0)
2021–2023	Liverpool	73	(0)
2024–2025	Universitario de Deportes	59	(0)
2026-	Peñarol	5	(0)
Medal record
Oriente Petrolero
Runner-up	Bolivian Primera División Clausura	2012–13
- * Club domestic league appearances and goals as of 17:06, 27 July 2020 (UTC)

Sebastián Javier Britos Rodríguez (born 2 January 1988) is a Uruguayan professional footballer who plays as a goalkeeper for club Peñarol.

== Career ==
Britos played in the youth ranks of Las Delicias. In 2010, he was signed by Bella Vista, where he made his professional debut, becoming an undisputed starter in his first season in the club, under manager Diego Alonso.

In 2012, Britos was signed by Montevideo Wanderers, by request of manager Alfredo Arias; however, he was unable to take the starting goalkeeper spot from Martín Rodríguez. Before the 2012–13 season, Britos was signed by Bolivian club Oriente Petrolero, where he played the 2012 Copa Sudamericana.

He played the following season in Liverpool de Montevideo, when the team was relegated, being the usual substitute for Guillermo de Amores. After a semester in the Segunda División, Britos was signed by Colombian club Cortuluá, where he did not play regularly.

He then moved to Cerro, where he played the 2017 Copa Libertadores qualifying stages. After that, Britos was sent on loan to El Tanque Sisley, club which he managed to save from relegation in a penalty shoot-out against Sud América.

In 2018, he signed for Juventud de las Piedras, finishing as a runner-up in the 2018 Segunda División.Halfway through 2019, Britos signed for Atlante F.C., where he did not get many opportunities to play. For the second semester of 2020, he moved to Uruguayan Segunda División club Rocha F.C., where he did not play in any match.

== Career statistics ==
=== Club ===
As of 3 November 2024.

Appearances and goals by club, season and competition
Club	Season	League			Cup		Continental		Other		Total	
Club	Season	Division	Apps	Goals	Apps	Goals	Apps	Goals	Apps	Goals	Apps	Goals
Bella Vista	2010–11	Uruguayan Primera División	23	0	—		—		—		23	0
Montevideo Wanderers	2011–12	Uruguayan Primera División	4	0	—		—		—		4	0
Oriente Petrolero	2012–13	Bolivian Primera División	14	0	—		2 (Note: Appearances in the Copa Sudamericana)	0	—		16	0
Liverpool Montevideo	2013–14	Uruguayan Primera División	1	0	—		—		—		1	0
Liverpool Montevideo	2014–15	Uruguayan Segunda División	9	0	—		—		—		9	0
Liverpool Montevideo	Total		10	0	—		—		—		10	0
Cortuluá	2015	Categoría Primera A	11	0	3 (Note: Appearances in the Copa Colombia)	0	—		—		14	0
CA Cerro	2015–16	Uruguayan Primera División	0	0	—		—		—		0	0
CA Cerro	2016	Uruguayan Primera División	11	0	—		—		—		11	0
CA Cerro	2017	Uruguayan Primera División	6	0	—		1 (Note: Appearances in the Copa Libertadores)	0	—		7	0
CA Cerro	Total		17	0	—		1	0	—		18	0
Tanque Sisley	2017	Uruguayan Primera División	16	0	—		—		—		16	0
Juventud	2018	Uruguayan Segunda División	26	0	—		—		—		26	0
Juventud	2019	Uruguayan Primera División	15	0	—		—		—		15	0
Juventud	Total		41	0	—		—		—		41	0
Atlante	2019–20	Ascenso MX	7	0	2 (Note: Appearances in the Copa MX)	0	—		—		9	0
Rocha F.C.	2020	Uruguayan Segunda División	0	0	—		—		—		0	0
Central Español	2020	Uruguayan Segunda División	7	0	—		—		—		7	0
Liverpool Montevideo	2021	Uruguayan Primera División	1	0	—		0	0	—		1	0
Liverpool Montevideo	2022	Uruguayan Primera División	28	0	—		6	0	—		34	0
Liverpool Montevideo	2023	Uruguayan Primera División	34	0	—		—		0	0	34	0
Liverpool Montevideo	Total		63	0	—		6	0	0	0	69	0
Universitario de Deportes	2024	Peruvian Primera División	27	0	—		6	0	—		33	0
Career total			240	0	5	0	15	0	0	0	260	0

== Honours ==
=== Club ===
Liverpool F.C. (Montevideo)

- 2023 Uruguayan Primera División season

Universitario de Deportes

- Peruvian Primera División: 2024
- Peruvian Primera División: 2025

Peñarol

- Supercopa Uruguaya: 2026
