= Mateo Antoni =

Uruguayan football player (born 2003)

Personal information
- Full name: Mateo Antoni Pavón
- Date of birth: 22 April 2003 (age 23)
- Place of birth: Montevideo, Uruguay
- Height: 1.81 m (5 ft 11 in)
- Position: Centre-back

Team information
- Current team: Alianza Lima (on loan from Argentinos Juniors)
- Number: 3

Youth career
- Nacional

Senior career*
Years	Team	Apps	(Gls)
2023–2025	Nacional	15	(1)
2023	→ Liverpool Montevideo (loan)	24	(1)
2025–	Argentinos Juniors	2	(0)
2026–	→ Alianza Lima (loan)	7	(0)

International career
2022–2023	Uruguay U20	20	(1)
Medal record
Men's football
Representing Uruguay
FIFA U-20 World Cup
Winner	2023 Argentina
South American U-20 Championship
Runner-up	2023 Colombia
- * Club domestic league appearances and goals as of 22 March 2026

Mateo Antoni Pavón (born 22 April 2003) is a Uruguayan professional footballer who plays as a centre-back for Alianza Lima, on loan from Argentine Primera División club Argentinos Juniors.

== International career ==
Antoni was part of the Uruguay under-20 team which won the 2023 FIFA U-20 World Cup and finished as runners-up at the 2023 South American U-20 Championship. In January 2024, he was named in Uruguay's squad for the 2024 CONMEBOL Pre-Olympic Tournament.

== Career statistics ==
=== Club ===
As of 1 December 2024.

Club	Division	Season	League		National cup		Continental		Total	
Club	Division	Season	Apps	Goals	Apps	Goals	Apps	Goals	Apps	Goals
Liverpool Montevideo	Uruguayan Primera División	2023	24	1	-		2	0	26	1
Nacional	Uruguayan Primera División	2024	15	1	4	0	6	1	25	2
Career total			39	2	4	0	8	1	51	3

== Honours ==
Uruguay U20

- FIFA U-20 World Cup: 2023
- South American U-20 Championship runner-up: 2023
