= Santiago Ramírez (footballer, born 2001) =

Uruguayan footballer (born 2001)

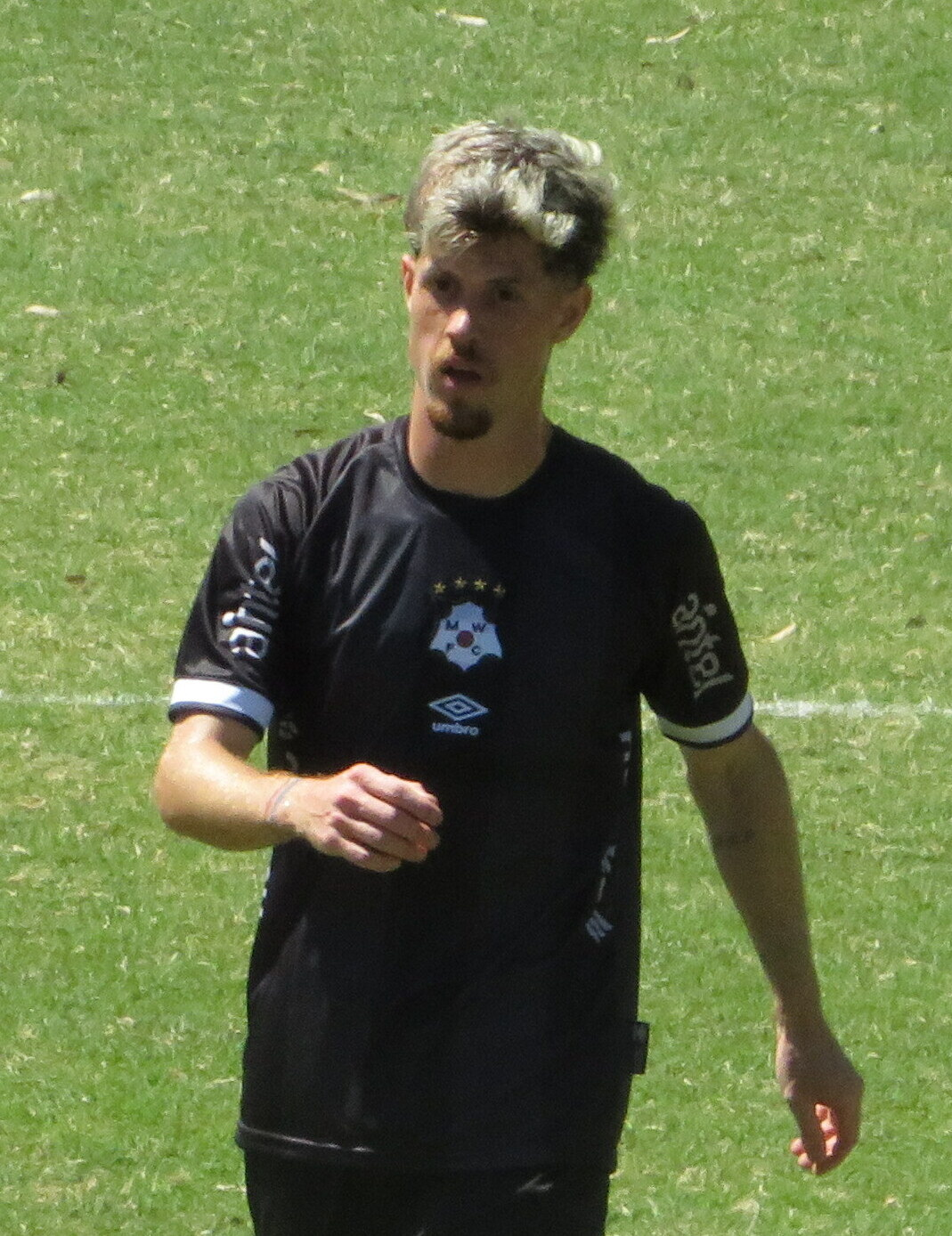
- Ramírez with Montevideo Wanderers in 2023

Personal information
- Full name: Santiago Valentín Ramírez Polero
- Date of birth: 3 September 2001 (age 25)
- Place of birth: Mercedes, Uruguay
- Height: 1.75 m (5 ft 9 in)
- Position: Forward

Team information
- Current team: Deportivo Maldonado
- Number: 17

Youth career
- Nacional

Senior career*
| Years | Team | Apps | (Gls) |
| 2021–2024 | Nacional | 32 | (3) |
| 2023 | → Montevideo Wanderers (loan) | 11 | (0) |
| 2023–2024 | → Rentistas (loan) | 12 | (3) |
| 2024– | Deportivo Maldonado | 54 | (4) |
| 2024 | → Rentistas (loan) | 10 | (3) |
- * Club domestic league appearances and goals as of 25 April 2026

Santiago Valentín Ramírez Polero (born 3 September 2001) is a Uruguayan professional footballer who plays as a forward for Liga AUF Uruguaya club Deportivo Maldonado.

== Career ==
A youth academy graduate of Nacional, Ramírez made his professional debut on 15 January 2021 in the Torneo Intermedio final against Montevideo Wanderers.

On 3 January 2023, Ramírez joined Montevideo Wanderers on a season long loan deal.

== Personal life ==
Santiago is the younger brother of fellow footballer Ignacio Ramírez.

== Career statistics ==
As of 3 February 2023

Appearances and goals by club, season and competition
| Club | Season | League | | | Cup | | Continental | | Other | | Total | |
| Club | Season | Division | Apps | Goals | Apps | Goals | Apps | Goals | Apps | Goals | Apps | Goals |
|---|---|---|---|---|---|---|---|---|---|---|---|---|
| Nacional | 2020 | Uruguayan Primera División | 4 | 0 | — | | 0 | 0 | 1 (Note: Appearance in Torneo Intermedio final.) | 0 | 5 | 0 |
| Nacional | 2021 | Uruguayan Primera División | 12 | 3 | — | | 0 | 0 | 0 | 0 | 12 | 3 |
| Nacional | 2022 | Uruguayan Primera División | 16 | 0 | 2 | 0 | 2 (Note: Appearances in Copa Sudamericana.) | 0 | 0 | 0 | 20 | 0 |
| Nacional | Total | | 32 | 3 | 2 | 0 | 2 | 0 | 1 | 0 | 37 | 3 |
| Montevideo Wanderers (loan) | 2023 | Uruguayan Primera División | 0 | 0 | 0 | 0 | — | | — | | 0 | 0 |
| Career total | | | 32 | 3 | 2 | 0 | 2 | 0 | 1 | 0 | 37 | 3 |

== Honours ==
Nacional

- Uruguayan Primera División: 2020, 2022
