= 2000 Campeonato Ecuatoriano de Fútbol Serie A =

Serie A
- Season: 2000
- Champions: Olmedo (1st title)
- Relegated: LDU Quito; Técnico Universitario
- Copa Libertadores: Olmedo; El Nacional; Emelec
- Top goalscorer: Alejandro Kenig (25 goals)

The 2000 Campeonato Ecuatoriano de Fútbol de la Serie A was the 42nd season of the Serie A, the top level of professional football in Ecuador. The season was won by Olmedo, who became the first team outside Quito and Guayaquil to win a national title.

== First stage ==
Pos	Team	Pld	W	D	L	GF	GA	GD	Pts	Qualification
1	Olmedo	18	8	6	4	18	14	+4	30	Qualified to the Liguilla Final
2	Aucas	18	8	5	5	20	17	+3	29	Qualified to the Liguilla Final
3	El Nacional	18	7	6	5	34	26	+8	27	Qualified to the Liguilla Final
4	LDU Quito	18	7	6	5	30	23	+7	27	
5	Macará	18	6	7	5	25	25	0	25	
6	Emelec	18	7	3	8	23	22	+1	24	
7	ESPOLI	18	6	6	6	19	20	−1	24	
8	Deportivo Quito	18	4	8	6	24	24	0	20	
9	Barcelona	18	4	7	7	19	27	−8	19	
10	Técnico Universitario	18	3	6	9	21	35	−14	15	

Source: RSSSF
Rules for classification: 1) points; 2) goal difference; 3) number of goals scored.

== Second stage ==
Pos	Team	Pld	W	D	L	GF	GA	GD	Pts	Qualification
1	Emelec	18	10	2	6	36	25	+11	32	Qualified to the Liguilla Final
2	El Nacional	18	10	3	5	34	24	+10	30 (Note: El Nacional had three points deducted for fielding an ineligible player in Round 16.)	Qualified to the Liguilla Final
3	Barcelona	18	8	5	5	25	17	+8	29	Qualified to the Liguilla Final
4	ESPOLI	18	8	4	6	24	16	+8	28	
5	Deportivo Quito	18	8	4	6	28	25	+3	28	
6	Macará	18	8	2	8	25	25	0	26	
7	Aucas	18	6	5	7	22	26	−4	23	
8	Olmedo	18	6	4	8	15	21	−6	22	
9	LDU Quito	18	5	5	8	20	24	−4	20	
10	Técnico Universitario	18	3	2	13	21	47	−26	11	

Source: RSSSF
Rules for classification: 1) points; 2) goal difference; 3) number of goals scored.

== Aggregate table ==
Pos	Team	Pld	W	D	L	GF	GA	GD	Pts	Qualification or relegation
1	El Nacional	36	17	9	10	68	50	+18	57 (Note: El Nacional had three points deducted for fielding an ineligible player in Round 16 of the Second Stage.)	
2	Emelec	36	17	5	14	59	47	+12	56	
3	ESPOLI	36	14	10	12	43	36	+7	52	Qualified to the Liguilla Final (Note: Since El Nacional qualified to the Liguilla Final twice, ESPOLI qualified to the last spot in the Liguilla Final as the best non-top-three finisher in the aggregate table.)
4	Aucas	36	14	10	12	42	43	−1	52	
5	Olmedo	36	14	10	12	33	35	−2	52	
6	Macará	36	14	9	13	50	50	0	51	
7	Deportivo Quito	36	12	12	12	52	49	+3	48	
8	Barcelona	36	12	12	12	44	45	−1	48	
9	LDU Quito	36	12	11	13	50	47	+3	47	Relegation to Serie B
10	Técnico Universitario	36	6	8	22	42	82	−40	26	Relegation to Serie B

Source: RSSSF
Rules for classification: 1) points; 2) goal difference; 3) number of goals scored.

== Liguilla Final ==
Pos	Team	Pld	W	D	L	GF	GA	GD	BP	Pts	Qualification
1	Olmedo	10	6	2	2	15	9	+6	3	23	2001 Copa Libertadores
2	El Nacional	10	5	2	3	15	11	+4	3	20	2001 Copa Libertadores
3	Emelec	10	5	2	3	13	13	0	3	20	2001 Copa Libertadores
4	Aucas	10	2	5	3	10	13	−3	2	13	
5	Barcelona	10	3	2	5	14	13	+1	1	12	
6	ESPOLI	10	1	3	6	6	14	−8	0	6	

Source: RSSSF
Rules for classification: 1) points; 2) goal difference; 3) number of goals scored. Includes bonus points earned in the previous stages.

Campeonato Ecuatoriano de Fútbol de la Serie A
2000 champion

1st title
