= Ignacio Pallas =

Uruguayan footballer (born 1983)

Personal information
- Full name: José Ignacio Pallas Martínez
- Date of birth: 5 January 1983 (age 43)
- Place of birth: Montevideo, Uruguay
- Height: 1.90 m (6 ft 3 in)
- Position: Centre back

Youth career
- River Plate Montevideo

Senior career*
Years	Team	Apps	(Gls)
2003–2004	River Plate Montevideo	18	(5)
2005–2007	Nacional	53	(4)
2007–2009	Correcaminos UAT	59	(1)
2009	Veracruz	8	(0)
2010	Racing Montevideo	11	(0)
2010–2011	Danubio	22	(0)
2011–2017	Fénix	161	(11)
2017–2018	Cerro Porteño	26	(0)
2018–2019	Puebla	18	(0)
2020–2021	Fénix	20	(0)

Managerial career
- 2021–2022: Fénix
- 2023: La Luz
- 2024: Cerro
- 2025: Fénix
- * Club domestic league appearances and goals

José Ignacio Pallas Martínez (born 5 January 1983) is a Uruguayan football manager and former player who played as a centre back.

== Career ==
=== Club career ===
In 2003, he began his career playing for River Plate from Montevideo. After two years with the darseneros, he was acquired by Uruguayan powerhouse Club Nacional de Football, where he played over the next to years.

In 2007, Pallas joined the Mexican team Correcaminos UAT from the second division. After 2 years in that club, Pallas moved to Veracruz another Mexican team from the Liga de Ascenso.

In January 2010 he decided to return to his native country to play for Racing Club de Montevideo. Racing made a good campaign at the Copa Libertadores 2010, where Pallas scored 1 goal. In August 2010 he moved again to join Danubio.
