= Marcelo Russo =

Uruguayan football manager

Personal information
- Full name: Marcelo Sebastián Russo López
- Date of birth: 31 January 1987 (age 39)
- Place of birth: Uruguay

Team information
- Current team: Paso de la Arena (manager)

Managerial career
- Years: Team
- 2019–2022: Villa Española (youth)
- 2023: La Luz (youth)
- 2023–2024: La Luz
- 2024–2025: Basáñez
- 2025–: Paso de la Arena

Marcelo Sebastián Russo López (born 31 January 1987) is a Uruguayan football manager, currently in charge of Paso de la Arena.

== Career ==
Russo played amateur football before moving to coaching in 2019, in charge of Villa Española's youth sides. Ahead of the 2023 season, he moved to La Luz and was appointed manager of the under-19 team.

On 25 July 2023, after the dismissal of Ignacio Pallas, Russo was named manager of La Luz's first team. His first match in charge occurred on 19 August, a 1–0 away win over Montevideo Wanderers.

Sacked on 17 April 2024, Russo took over Basáñez on 1 September of that year.
