= Lucas Nardi =

Argentine football manager (born 1980)

Personal information
- Full name: Lucas Andrés Nardi
- Date of birth: 7 September 1980 (age 46)
- Place of birth: Justiniano Posse, Argentina
- Height: 1.74 m (5 ft 9 in)
- Position: Midfielder

Youth career
- Estudiantes

Senior career*
Years	Team	Apps	(Gls)
2000–2003	Estudiantes	20	(0)
2002–2003	→ Quilmes (loan)	24	(1)
2003–2004	Defensa y Justicia	29	(4)
2004–2005	San Martín-M	36	(5)
2005	Belgrano	7	(0)
2006	San Martín-SJ	17	(4)
2006–2007	Huracán de Tres Arroyos	21	(0)
2007	Aldosivi	4	(0)
2008	Guaraní	4	(0)
2009	Patronato	11	(0)
2009–2010	Sportivo Belgrano	18	(0)
2010–2011	Complejo Deportivo	22	(4)
Total		213	(18)

Managerial career
- 2015–2016: Banfield (assistant)
- 2017: Estudiantes (reserves)
- 2017: Quilmes
- 2020: Qatar U19
- 2021–2022: Club América (assistant)
- 2022: Montevideo City Torque (interim)
- 2023: Montevideo City Torque
- * Club domestic league appearances and goals

Lucas Andrés Nardi (born 7 September 1980) is an Argentine football manager and former player who played as a midfielder.

== Playing career ==
Nardi began his career with Estudiantes de La Plata, making his first team debut in 2000. In 2002, he was loaned to Quilmes, and subsequently went on to represent Defensa y Justicia, San Martín de Mendoza, Belgrano de Córdoba, San Martín de San Juan, Huracán de Tres Arroyos and Aldosivi before moving abroad with Paraguayan side Guaraní in 2008.

Nardi returned to his home country in 2009, joining Patronato. He subsequently played for Sportivo Belgrano before moving to hometown side Complejo Deportivo Teniente Origone in 2010, and retired in the following year at the age of 30.

== Managerial career ==
After retiring, Nardi worked as manager for amateur local sides before joining Banfield, initially as an assistant of the youth categories. He then worked as an assistant of Claudio Vivas in the first team before moving to his first side Estudiantes in January 2017.

On 12 July 2017, Nardi was appointed manager of another club he represented as a player, Quilmes. He resigned on 23 November, and moved to Qatar in the following year to work in the Aspire Academy.

In December 2020, after a three-month spell as manager of Qatar national under-19 team, Nardi was named Santiago Solari's assistant at Mexican side Club América. He left with Solari in March 2022, and later joined Montevideo City Torque as the head of the methodology department.

On 22 September 2022, Nardi was named interim manager of Torque until the end of the season. He returned to his previous role after the appointment of Ignacio Ithurralde, but was permanently named manager on 11 April 2023, after Ithurralde was sacked.

Nardi resigned from Torque on 12 September 2023.
