= Nicolás Vigneri =

Uruguayan footballer (born 1983)

Personal information
- Full name: Nicolás Ignacio Vigneri Cetrulo
- Date of birth: 6 July 1983 (age 43)
- Place of birth: Montevideo, Uruguay
- Height: 1.78 m (5 ft 10 in)
- Positions: Winger; striker

Senior career*
Years	Team	Apps	(Gls)
2003–2005	Fénix	79	(29)
2006–2007	Peñarol	55	(20)
2008	→ Cruz Azul (loan)	24	(8)
2009	Racing Club	4	(0)
2009–2010	Puebla	15	(4)
2010	→ Xerez (loan)	0	(0)
2010–2011	Fénix	26	(5)
2012	→ Nacional (loan)	5	(0)
2012–2013	→ Emelec (loan)	21	(5)
2013	Deportivo Quevedo	15	(0)
2014	Los Caimanes	2	(0)
2014–2015	Rampla Juniors	8	(0)
2015	Huracán	13	(5)
2015–2016	Murciélagos	29	(5)
2016	Cartaginés	8	(1)
2017–2018	Murciélagos	25	(4)
2018	Fénix	14	(3)
2019	Villa Teresa	20	(7)
2020–2021	Uruguay Montevideo		

International career
2003–2007	Uruguay	9	(2)

Managerial career
- 2021–2022: Uruguay Montevideo
- 2023: Plaza Colonia
- 2023–2024: Rampla Juniors
- 2024: Fénix
- 2025: Rentistas
- * Club domestic league appearances and goals

Nicolás Ignacio Vigneri Cetrulo (born 6 July 1983) is a Uruguayan football manager and former player who played as either a winger or a striker.

== Playing career ==
Vigneri began in 2003 at age 18 in Fénix of Uruguay, where he participated in the 6–1 vs Cruz Azul of Mexico for Copa Libertadores.

In 2006 he went to Peñarol, one of the biggest teams in the country. In 2008, he joined Cruz Azul on loan. He made his Interliga debut against San Luis in a 1–0 victory. Vigneri scored his first goal in the third match of his team in the 2008 Interliga against Pumas. He scored his second goal in the final of the Torneo Clausura 2008 against Santos Laguna.

In 2009, he joined Argentine club Racing Club. Later the same year, he was transferred to Puebla of Mexico, where he scored 4 goals and reached the final stages of the tournament. in 2010 he joined Spanish club Xerez in Primera División de España on loan.

Later the same year he returned to former club Fénix, before moving in January 2011 to Nacional, winning the championship.

On July 21, 2011 he was announced by Ecuadorian side Emelec's official website as its new striker on a loan with an option to buy, scoring 8 goals and good performances to reach the final.

In 2013 returned to Fénix for a third spell, scoring 4 goals in the tournament.

Later that year he returned to Ecuador to join Deportivo Quevedo of Ecuadorian Serie A. In January 2014 he was hired by Los Caimanes of Peruvian Primera División.

In July 2020, Vigneri moved to Uruguayan amateur club Uruguay Montevideo. He retired in the following year, aged 38.

== Managerial career ==
Immediately after retiring, Vigneri became the manager of his last club Uruguay Montevideo. He left the club in November 2022, and took over Plaza Colonia the following 5 January, after Alejandro Apud's resignation.

Vigneri left Plaza Colonia on a mutual agreement on 17 May 2023, after finishing 12th in the Apertura tournament. He subsequently led Rampla Juniors to a promotion to the top tier before opting to leave the club on 30 January 2024.

== Career statistics ==
=== International ===
Appearances and goals by national team and year
National team	Year	Apps	Goals
Uruguay	2003	4	1
Uruguay	2006	3	1
Uruguay	2007	2	0
Total		9	2

Scores and results list Uruguay's goal tally first, score column indicates score after each Vigneri goal.

List of international goals scored by Nicolás Vigneri
No.	Date	Venue	Opponent	Score	Result	Competition
1	24 July 2003	National Stadium of Peru, Lima, Peru	Peru	4–3	4–3	Friendly
2	30 May 2006	Hammadi Agrebi Stadium, Tunis, Tunisia	Libya	1–0	2–1	Friendly

== Honours ==
Cruz Azul

- Clausura runner-up: 2008

Emelec

- Ecuadorian Serie A runner-up: 2011

Nacional

- Uruguayan League: 2010–11
