= Jorge González (Uruguayan football manager) =

Uruguayan football manager (born 1954)

Personal information
- Full name: Jorge Wálter González Estévez
- Date of birth: 26 September 1950 (age 76)
- Place of birth: Montevideo, Uruguay
- Position: Defender

Senior career*
| Years | Team | Apps | (Gls) |
| 1973–1974 | Progreso | | |
| 1975–1979 | Liverpool Montevideo | | |
| 1980–1983 | Sud América | | |
| 1984 | Montevideo Wanderers | | |
| 1984 | San Luis | 23 | (1) |
| 1985 | Deportes Iquique | 33 | (2) |
| 1986 | Huachipato | 30 | (0) |
| 1987 | Deportes Iquique | 25 | (1) |
| 1988 | Coquimbo Unido | | |

International career
| 1979–1980 | Uruguay | 4 | (0) |

Managerial career
- 1989–1993: Coquimbo Unido (youth)
- 1993: Huracán FC
- 1993–1994: Cerro (youth)
- 1994: Bella Vista (assistant)
- 1995: Bella Vista
- 1996: Miramar Misiones
- 1998–2001: Cerro
- 2002: Progreso
- 2003–2004: Tacuarembó
- 2004–2005: Pelita Krakatau Steel
- 2005–2006: Fénix
- 2006–2008: Cerro
- 2009: Atenas
- 2010: Puntarenas
- 2010: Tacuarembó
- 2011: Tacuarembó
- 2019: Cerro
- 2020: Canadian
- 2021: Calpino
- * Club domestic league appearances and goals

Jorge Wálter González Estévez (born 26 September 1970) is a Uruguayan football manager.

== Playing career ==
A defender, González played in his homeland for Progreso, Liverpool, Sud América and Montevideo Wanderers between 1973 and 1984.

He continued his career in Chile with San Luis de Quillota (1984), Deportes Iquique (1985 and 1987) and Huachipato (1986) in the top level and Coquimbo Unido (1988) in the second level.

At international level, González earned 4 caps for the Uruguay national team in 1979 and 1980.
