= Sebastian Díaz (footballer, born 1983) =

Uruguayan footballer

Personal information
- Full name: Sebastian Díaz Villán
- Date of birth: 28 June 1983 (age 43)
- Place of birth: Montevideo, Uruguay
- Height: 1.85 m (6 ft 1 in)
- Position: Centre-back

Senior career*
| Years | Team | Apps | (Gls) |
| 2001–2007 | Central Español | 61 | (2) |
| 2007 | Huracán | ? | (?) |
| 2008 | Defensor Sporting | 5 | (0) |
| 2008–2009 | Racing Club | 17 | (0) |
| 2009–2010 | Comunicaciones | ? | (3) |
| 2010–2011 | Racing Club | 23 | (0) |
| 2011–2012 | Gimnasia Jujuy | 32 | (1) |
| 2012–2013 | Deportivo Merlo | 33 | (2) |
| 2013–2016 | Atlanta | 72 | (2) |
| 2016 | Sportivo Italiano | 0 | (0) |
| 2017–2019 | Plaza Colonia | 55 | (2) |

Managerial career
- 2019–2023: Plaza Colonia (assistant)
- 2023–2025: Plaza Colonia
- * Club domestic league appearances and goals

Sebastian Díaz Villán (born 28 June 1983) is a Uruguayan retired footballer who played as a centre-back.

== Coaching career ==
Díaz decided to retire at the end of the 2018–19 season, but continued at Plaza Colonia as the technical assistant manager of manager Matías Rosa.
