= Rosario Martínez (football manager) =

Uruguayan football manager

Personal information
- Date of birth: 3 September 1957
- Place of birth: Santa Lucía, Uruguay
- Date of death: 22 April 2021 (aged 63)
- Place of death: Santa Lucía, Uruguay

Senior career*
| Years | Team | Apps | (Gls) |
- Quilmes de Florida

Managerial career
- 1988–1989: Nacional Montevideo (assistant)
- 1990: Wanderers de Santa Lucía
- 1990: El Tanque Sisley (assistant)
- 1991: Atlético Florida
- 1991: Salus
- 1992: Danubio (youth)
- 1993: Bella Vista (assistant)
- 1994–1995: Olmedo
- 1996: Xelajú
- 1997: Nacional Montevideo (assistant)
- 1998: Progreso
- 1999: Independiente Petrolero
- 2000: Real Santa Cruz
- 2001: Real Potosí
- 2002: Guabirá
- 2003: Olmedo
- 2004: Real Potosí
- 2005: Universidad Católica del Ecuador
- 2006–2007: Peñarol (assistant)
- 2007–2009: Fénix (youth)
- 2010–2012: Fénix
- 2013: Racing Montevideo
- 2014–2016: Fénix
- 2017: Liverpool Montevideo
- 2019: Rampla Juniors
- * Club domestic league appearances and goals

Rosario Martínez (3 September 1957 – 22 April 2021) was a Uruguayan football manager and former player.

== Career ==
Born in Santa Lucía, Canelones, Martínez played as a senior for Quilmes de Florida, and began his managerial career with Wanderers de Santa Lucía in 1990. After being in charge of lowly sides Atlético Florida and Salus, he moved abroad in 1994 to take over Ecuadorian side Olmedo.

Martínez was in charge of Guatemalan club Xelajú in 1996, and became an assistant of Roberto Fleitas at Nacional Montevideo in the following year. In 1999, after a season at Progreso, he moved to Bolivia with Independiente Petrolero.

Martínez continued to work in the country in the following years, with Real Santa Cruz, Real Potosí (two stints) and Guabirá, aside from another spell at Oviedo. In 2005 he returned to Ecuador, now with Universidad Católica, but resigned in April.

In 2006, Martínez became Gregorio Pérez's assistant at Peñarol. He subsequently worked in the youth sides of Fénix before being named manager of the first team in January 2010, replacing Julio César Ribas.

Martínez resigned from Fénix on 13 May 2012, and took over Racing Montevideo on 1 July 2013. He resigned in December, and returned to Fénix on 24 November 2014.

After leaving Fénix at the end of the 2016 season, Martínez was named in charge of Liverpool Montevideo on 5 September 2017. Dismissed on 4 December, he spent more than a year without a club before taking over Rampla Juniors on 4 March 2019.

Sacked by Rampla on 19 August 2019, Martínez retired shortly after due to heart issues.

== Death ==
On 22 April 2021, Martínez died at the age of 63 due to a heart attack.
