= Santiago María Ramírez Ruíz de Dulanto =

Spanish Catholic priest and philosopher (1891–1967)

Santiago Ramírez OP, STM
- Born: 25 July 1891; Samiano, Spain
- Died: 18 December 1967 (aged 76); Salamanca, Spain
- Other name: Santiago María Ramírez Ruíz de Dulanto
- Education: Pontifical University of Saint Thomas Aquinas
- Church: Latin Church
- Ordained: 16 July 1916
- Writings: see below

Santiago María Ramírez Ruíz de Dulanto (Samiano, Burgos, 25 July 1891 – Salamanca, 18 December 1967) was a Dominican friar, priest, professor of philosophy and theology, and noted 20th century Thomist. He participated in the Second Vatican Council as a peritus.

== Life ==
Ramírez was born in 1891 into a family of farmers and entered the major Catholic seminary in Logroño. He subsequently left to enter the Order of Preachers in 1911. His novitiate took place in Corias, Asturias, and he received the tonsure in 1914. After completing his studies at the Pontifical University of Saint Thomas Aquinas (also known as the Angelicum) in Rome, he was ordained a priest on 16 July 1916. He subsequently taught theology and philosophy at the Convent of San Esteban, Salamanca, at the University of Freiburg, and at the "Luis Vives" Institute of Philosophy.

In 1949, he travelled to the United States to attend the Dominican General Chapter, held at the Dominican House of Studies in Washington, DC., where he served on the Chapter's Commission pertaining to Study (De Studiis).

In 1960, he was appointed as a member of the Preparatory Commission for the Second Vatican Council. He was subsequently named a peritus for the Council's Theological Commission.

He died in 1967 and was buried in the Convent of San Esteban in the so-called "Pantheon of Theologians" alongside other noted theologians, including Melchor Cano, Francisco de Vitoria, and Domingo de Soto.
