= Alejandro Apud =

Uruguayan footballer and manager (born 1967)

Personal information
- Full name: Alejandro Rubén Apud Varela
- Date of birth: 21 October 1967 (age 59)
- Place of birth: Montevideo, Uruguay
- Height: 1.89 m (6 ft 2 in)
- Position: Goalkeeper

Senior career*
Years	Team	Apps	(Gls)
1988	Fénix		
1989–1990	Nacional		
1991–1992	Fénix		
1993	Talleres		
1994	Fénix		
1995–1996	Liverpool Montevideo		
1996	Dragón		
1997	Fénix		
1998	Basáñez		
1999	Liverpool Montevideo		
2000	Fénix		
2001	Rampla Juniors		

Managerial career
- 2004: Fénix (youth)
- 2006–2008: Fénix (assistant)
- 2008–2009: Cerro (assistant)
- 2009: Blooming (assistant)
- 2009–2010: Cerro (assistant)
- 2010–2011: Cerro
- 2011–2014: Sud América
- 2014–2015: Liverpool Montevideo
- 2016: Atenas de San Carlos
- 2016–2018: Boston River
- 2019: Racing Montevideo
- 2020–2021: Juventud de Las Piedras
- 2022: Ayacucho
- 2022: Cantolao
- 2023: Boston River
- 2024–2025: Danubio
- 2025: Montevideo Wanderers
- 2026: Cerro
- * Club domestic league appearances and goals

Alejandro Rubén Apud Varela (born 22 October 1967) is a Uruguayan football manager and former player who played as a goalkeeper.

== Career ==
Born in Montevideo, Apud played as a goalkeeper for Uruguayan clubs Centro Atlético Fénix, Club Nacional de Football, Liverpool F.C. (Montevideo) and Rampla Juniors.

After retiring, Apud became a football manager. He led Sud América, Liverpool F.C. (Montevideo) and Atenas de San Carlos, before being appointed manager of Boston River during its first season in the Uruguayan Primera División, earning a place in the 2017 Copa Sudamericana. On April 17, 2024 he replaced Mario Saralegui as manager of Danubio F.C.
