= José Puente =

Uruguayan footballer and coach (born 1968)

Personal information
- Full name: José Silvano Puente Larrosa
- Date of birth: 10 April 1968 (age 58)
- Place of birth: Montevideo, Uruguay
- Height: 1.83 m (6 ft 0 in)
- Position: Defender

Senior career*
Years	Team	Apps	(Gls)
1983–1986	Central Español		
1987–1995	Liverpool Montevideo		
1996–1998	Cobreloa	71	(2)
1999	Olimpia	8	(1)
2000	LDU Quito	26	(3)
2001	Liverpool Montevideo		
2002	Cerro		
2003–2007	Central Español	108	(2)
2007	Racing Montevideo	7	(0)

Managerial career
- 2008: Racing Montevideo
- 2008–2009: Boston River
- 2010–2011: Racing Montevideo
- 2011–2013: Liverpool Montevideo (youth)
- 2012: Liverpool Montevideo (interim)
- 2014–2016: Cerro (youth)
- 2016: Cerro (interim)
- 2017: Juventud Las Piedras
- 2019–2021: River Plate Montevideo (youth)
- Plaza Colonia
- * Club domestic league appearances and goals

José Silvano Puente Larrosa (born April 10, 1968, in Montevideo, Uruguay) is a former Uruguayan footballer and current coach. He played in several clubs of Uruguay, Paraguay, Chile and Ecuador.

== Teams ==
- (Uruguay) Central Español 1983–1986
- (Uruguay) Liverpool 1987–1995
- (Chile) Cobreloa 1996–1998
- (Paraguay) Olimpia 1999
- (Ecuador) Liga Deportiva Universitaria de Quito 2000
- (Uruguay) Liverpool 2001
- (Uruguay) Cerro 2002
- (Uruguay) Central Español 2003–2007
- (Uruguay) Racing Club de Montevideo 2007
