= Emiliano Sosa =

Uruguayan footballer

Personal information
- Full name: Emiliano Gastón Sosa Viera
- Date of birth: 18 February 1998 (age 28)
- Place of birth: Montevideo, Uruguay
- Height: 1.76 m (5 ft 9 in)
- Position: Midfielder

Team information
- Current team: Cobresal

Youth career
- Nacional

Senior career*
Years	Team	Apps	(Gls)
2019	Nacional	0	(0)
2020–2022	Cerro	53	(3)
2023–2024	Boston River	35	(0)
2024	→ Orense (loan)	6	(0)
2024–	Cobresal	0	(0)
- * Club domestic league appearances and goals as of 19 July 2024

Emiliano Gastón Sosa Viera (born 18 February 1998) is a Uruguayan footballer who plays as a midfielder for Chilean Primera División club Cobresal.

== Club career ==
A product of Nacional, Sosa was a member of the team that won the 2018 U20 Copa Libertadores. In 2020, he switched to Cerro in the top division.

In 2023, Sosa signed with Boston River. The next year, he was loaned out to Ecuadorian club Orense in the top level with an option to buy.

In the second half of 2024, Sosa moved to Chile and joined Cobresal in the Primera División.
