= La Luz F.C. =

Uruguayan football club

La Luz
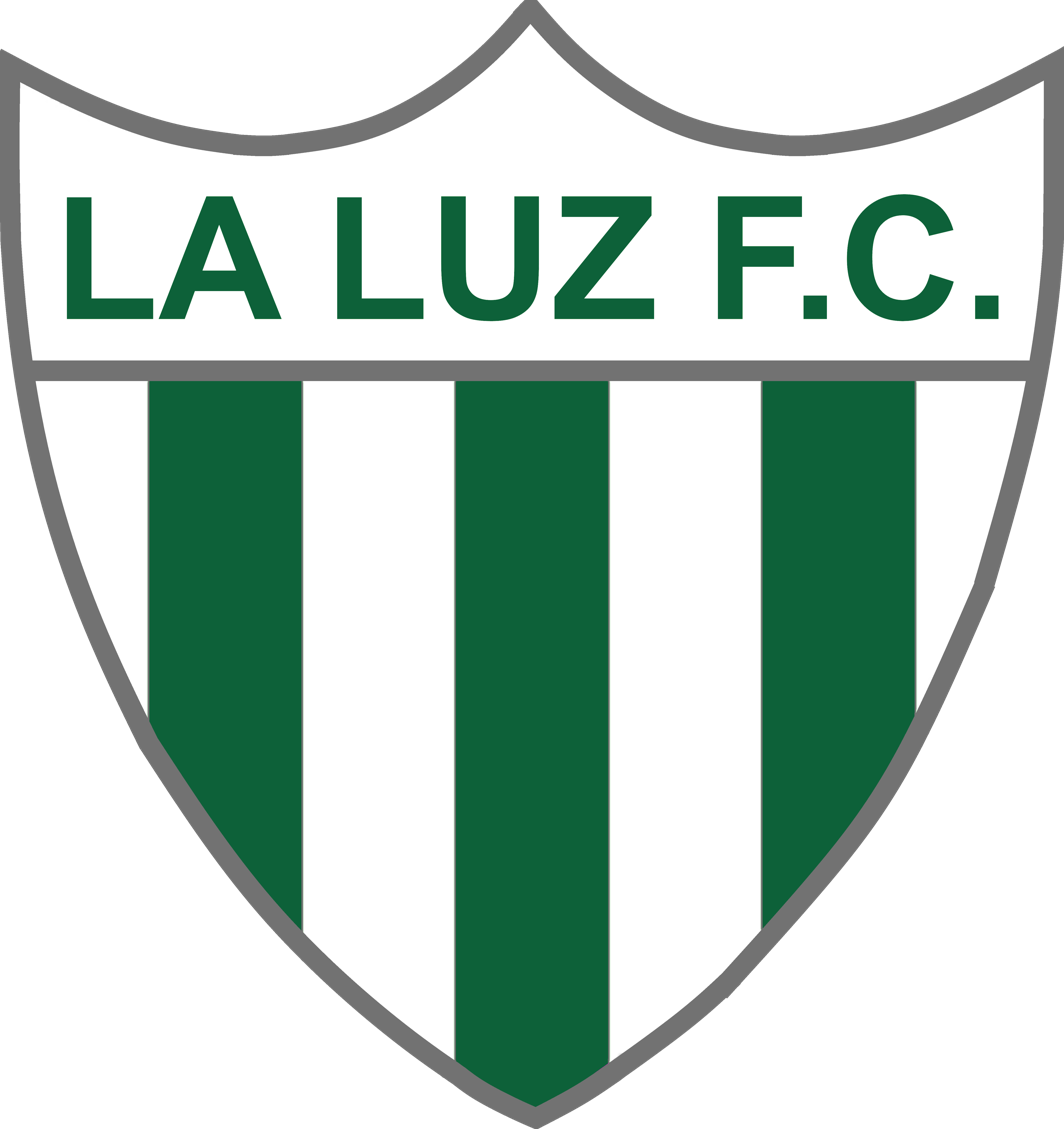
- Full name: La Luz Fútbol Club
- Nickname: Los Merengues de Aires Puros
- Founded: April 19, 1929
- Ground: Parque Liebig's; Fray Bentos, Uruguay
- Capacity: 5,000
- Chairman: Cnel. Luis Agosto Bessonart
- Manager: Marcelo Russo
- League: Segunda División
- 2025: Segunda División, 10th of 14
Home colours	Away colours

La Luz Fútbol Club (often called La Luz) is a Uruguayan professional football club from Aires Puros, Montevideo, who currently play in the Uruguayan Segunda División.

== History ==
A group of friends by the names, Luis Rivero, Luis Enrico, and Jose Ruecco, were at a bar in the Aires Puros barrio of Montevideo, when they had an idea of founding a new football club. However, they struggled to find a name for the new club. The bar they were in was one of the few buildings in the area that had electricity by that time, and this is where the name "La Luz" came from. The new club was officially founded on 19 April 1929 as La Luz Football Club, adopting white kits.

For much of its early history in the 1930s and 40s the club was competing in the amateur divisions at the time like the Division Extra and Division Intermedia. In 1962, the club won the Intermedia title and was promoted for the first time to the second division (Primera B).

The club has some good campaigns during their first few seasons in the second division; in 1964 they finished third and in 1965 and 1967 they finished runner-up while barely missing promotion to the top flight of Uruguayan football. In 1971, the club was relegated. In 1976 the club won the league title again and was promoted, where they barely missed out on promotion to the top flight numerous times, such as in 1978 where they finished runner-up.

For the 80s, 90s and early 2000s the club yo-yoed in the second and third divisions. In 2021, they were promoted back to the second division after thirteen years. Having lost 3-0 in the first leg to Villa Teresa, the penultimate placed team in the second division, La Luz was able to tie the series up and win on penalties, returning to professional football for the first time in 13 years.

2022 was arguably the best year in the club's history; they reached the final of the first edition of the Copa Uruguay, eliminating powerhouse Peñarol in the semi-finals but later finished runner-up to Defensor Sporting after losing 1-0 in the final. In 2022 they also achieved promotion to the top flight for the first time in club history, after finishing league runner-up behind Racing Montevideo.

== Titles ==
- Uruguayan Segunda División Amateur: 1962, 1976, 1992, 2001, 2003.
- Liga Uruguaya de Football Amateur - Divisional Extra: 1933
