= Gustavo Ferreyra =

Uruguayan footballer and manager (born 1972)

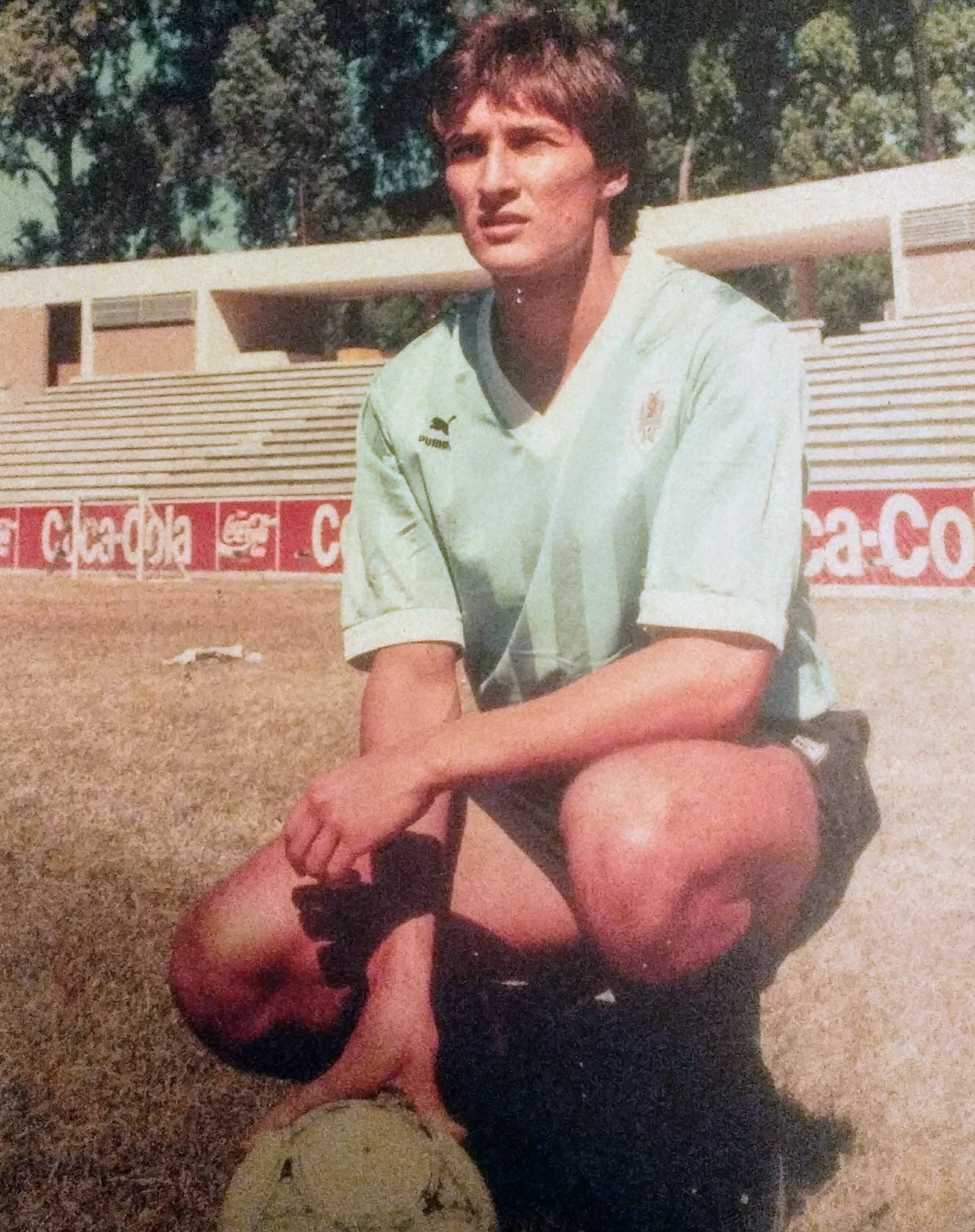

Personal information
- Full name: Gustavo Wáshington Ferreyra Briozzo
- Date of birth: 29 May 1972 (age 54)
- Place of birth: Montevideo, Uruguay
- Height: 1.80 m (5 ft 11 in)
- Position: Forward

Team information
- Current team: Boston River (director of youth football)

Senior career*
Years	Team	Apps	(Gls)
1988–1991	Central Español		
1991–1994	Peñarol		
1994–1995	Deportivo Saprissa		
1996	Central Español		

International career
1991	Uruguay	5	(1)

Managerial career
- 2009–2014: Uruguay U17 (assistant)
- 2014–2019: Uruguay U20 (assistant)
- 2019–2021: Uruguay U20
- 2019–2021: Uruguay U23
- 2023: Cerro
- 2025: Boston River (caretaker)
- * Club domestic league appearances and goals

Gustavo Wáshington Ferreyra Briozzo (born 29 May 1972) is a Uruguayan football manager and former player who played as a forward. He is the current director of youth football of Boston River.

== Club career ==
Ferreyra spent most of his career playing for Central Español and Peñarol in the Primera División Uruguaya.

== International career ==
Ferreyra made five appearances for the senior Uruguay national football team during 1991.

== Career statistics ==
=== International ===
Scores and results list Uruguay's goal tally first, score column indicates score after each Ferreyra goal.

List of international goals scored by Gustavo Ferreyra
No.	Date	Venue	Opponent	Score	Result	Competition
1	7 May 1991	Los Angeles Memorial Coliseum, Los Angeles, United States	Mexico	2–0	2–0	Friendly
