= Agustín Miranda (footballer, born 1992) =

Uruguayan association football player

Personal information
- Full name: Agustín Sebastián Miranda Cambón
- Date of birth: 28 November 1992 (age 33)
- Place of birth: Montevideo, Uruguay
- Height: 1.77 m (5 ft 10 in)
- Position: Midfielder

Team information
- Current team: Plaza Colonia
- Number: 10

Senior career*
| Years | Team | Apps | (Gls) |
| 2011–2015 | Sud América | 2 | (0) |
| 2015 | → Central Español (loan) | 12 | (2) |
| 2015–2016 | Oriental | 18 | (2) |
| 2016–2017 | Villa Teresa | 24 | (7) |
| 2017– | Plaza Colonia | 35 | (4) |
- * Club domestic league appearances and goals as of 8 March 2019

Agustín Sebastián Miranda Cambón (born 28 November 1992) is a Uruguayan footballer who plays as a midfielder for Plaza Colonia in the Uruguayan Primera División.
