= Centro Atlético Fénix =

Sports club in Uruguay

Fénix
- Full name: Centro Atlético Fénix
- Nicknames: Albivioletas; El Ave; Los de Capurro; La Máquina de Capurro; Los Mugrientos
- Founded: 7 July 1916; 110 years ago
- Ground: Estadio Parque Capurro, Montevideo, Uruguay
- Capacity: 10,000
- Chairman: Héctor Repetto
- Manager: Ignacio Pallas
- League: Segunda División
- 2025: Segunda División, 9th of 14
- Website: www.cafenix.com.uy
Home colours	Away colours

Centro Atlético Fénix is a Uruguayan sports club from Montevideo. The football team currently plays in Uruguayan Segunda División. Fénix is one of the most popular and traditional teams of Uruguay's 2nd Division, along with Racing Club de Montevideo, which is its all-time rival.

== History ==
The club was founded on 7 July 1916 by a group of young men who named the club "Fénix" (Phoenix) after the mythological bird. The club's colors are violet (chosen to represent eternity) and white (to represent purity). They later took part in 1985 edition of historic IFA Shield in India.

In 2002 the club qualified to play in Copa Libertadores for the first time after winning the Liguilla Pre-Libertadores de América title, a feat they repeated in 2003. The club were later relegated from the Primera División at the end of the 2005/2006 season.

== Titles ==
- Liguilla Pre-Libertadores de América: 2
  - 2002, 2003
- Segunda División: 7
  - 1956, 1959, 1973, 1977, 1985, 2007, 2009
- Tercera División: 3
  - 1942, 1949, 1991

== Performance in Conmebol competitions ==
- Copa Libertadores: 2 appearances

2003: First Round
2004: First Round

- Copa Sudamericana: 4 appearances

2011: First Round
2016: First Round
2020: Round of 16
2021: First Round

== Players ==
=== Current squad ===
As of 30 July 2024

Note: Flags indicate national team as defined under FIFA eligibility rules; some limited exceptions apply. Players may hold more than one non-FIFA nationality.

No.	Pos.	Nation	Player
1	GK	URU	Aarón Soria
4	DF	URU	Maximiliano Perg
5	MF	URU	Andrés Schetino
7	MF	URU	Wiston Fernández
8	MF	BRA	Breno Caetano
9	FW	URU	Sebastián da Silva
10	MF	URU	Diego Vicente
11	MF	URU	Fabián Estoyanoff
12	GK	PAR	Pedro González (on loan from Olimpia)
13	DF	URU	Guillermo Pereira
14	MF	URU	Agustín Alfaro (on loan from Deportivo Maldonado)
15	DF	URU	Agustín Chopitea
16	MF	URU	Braulio Guisolfo (on loan from Peñarol)
17	FW	URU	Sergio Cortelezzi
18	FW	URU	Axel Pérez (on loan from Racing de Montevideo)
19	FW	URU	Maximiliano Juambeltz

No.	Pos.	Nation	Player
20	DF	URU	Santiago Franca
21	MF	URU	Santiago Viera
22	DF	URU	Agustín Da Silveira
23	DF	URU	Adrián Argachá
24	DF	URU	Juan Álvez
25	GK	URU	Emiliano Márquez
26	FW	URU	Sebastián De Marco
27	FW	ARG	Mauro Cachi
28	DF	URU	Facundo Rodríguez
30	MF	URU	Matías Cabrera
31	MF	BRA	Dudu
32	FW	URU	Rodrigo Hernández
33	GK	URU	Agustín Requena
40	FW	URU	Facundo de León (on loan from Nacional)
44	DF	URU	Emanuel Carlos
54	MF	URU	Santiago Scotto

== Managers ==
- (Uruguay) Ricardo "Tato" Ortíz (Jan 1, 1994 – Dec 31, 1994)
- (Uruguay) Juan Ramón Carrasco (Jan 1, 2002 – April 21, 2003)
- (Uruguay) Antonio Alzamendi (April 21, 2003 – May 3, 2004)
- (Uruguay) Miguel Ángel Piazza (May 3, 2004 – May 16, 2005)
- (Uruguay) Jorge González (Oct 17, 2005 – June 30, 2006)
- (Uruguay) Pablo Repetto (July 1, 2006 – Feb 28, 2008)
- (Uruguay) Manuel Keosseián (Feb 28, 2008 – June 1, 2008)
- (Uruguay) Jorge Giordano (July 1, 2008 – June 30, 2009)
- (Uruguay) Luis López (July 2009 – September 2009)
- (Uruguay) Julio César Ribas (Oct 5, 2009 – Jan 4, 2010)
- (Uruguay) Rosario Martínez (Jan 5, 2010 – May 14, 2012)
- (Uruguay) Lorenzo Carrabs 2012
- (Uruguay) Eduardo Favaro 2012–2013
- (Uruguay) Lorenzo Carrabs 2013
- (Uruguay) Juan Tejera 2013–2014
- (Uruguay) Gustavo Bueno 2014
- (Uruguay) Rosario Martínez 2014–2016
- (Argentina) Marcelo Escudero 2016
- (Uruguay) Gustavo Ferrín 2017
- (Uruguay) Nathaniel Revetria 2017–2018
- (Uruguay) Juan Ramón Carrasco 2018–2021
- (Uruguay) Ignacio Pallas 2021–2022
- (Uruguay) Damián Santín 2023
- (Uruguay) Leonel Rocco 2023–2024
- (Uruguay) Nicolás Vigneri 2024
- (Uruguay) Ignacio Pallas 2025–

== Other teams ==
Centro Atlético Fénix also has a esports division, with squads of NBA 2K, Formula 1 and FIFA games.
