= Damián Santín =

Uruguayan footballer and manager (born 1980)

Personal information
- Full name: Sergio Damián Santín Francia
- Date of birth: 22 September 1980 (age 46)
- Place of birth: Cúcuta, Colombia
- Height: 1.87 m (6 ft 2 in)
- Position: Centre-back

Team information
- Current team: Colón FC (manager)

Senior career*
Years	Team	Apps	(Gls)
2000	Basáñez		
2001–2002	Deportivo Maldonado	11	(0)
2003	Villa Española		
2004–2005	Rentistas	43	(2)
2005–2006	Instituto	11	(0)
2006–2007	Danubio	10	(0)
2008	Fénix	6	(0)
2009	Caxias	11	(0)
2009–2010	Olimpo	32	(3)
2010	Atlético Nacional	9	(0)
2011–2012	Bella Vista	17	(1)
2012–2013	Tristán Suárez	26	(2)
2013–2016	Villa Española		

Managerial career
- 2019–2021: Villa Española
- 2021–2022: Racing Montevideo
- 2023: Fénix
- 2023: Cerro
- 2024–: Colón FC
- * Club domestic league appearances and goals

Sergio Damián Santín Francia (born 22 September 1980) is a Colombian-born Uruguayan football manager and former player who played as a defender. He is the current manager of Colón FC.

He played for several clubs in the South America, including Danubio, Olimpo, Atlético Nacional and Bella Vista.
