= 2000 in Ecuadorian football =

Football in Ecuador
- Season: 2000

The 2000 season is the 78th season of competitive football in Ecuador.

== National leagues ==
=== Serie A ===
- Champion: Olmedo (1st title)
- International cup qualifiers:
  - 2001 Copa Libertadores: Olmedo, El Nacional, Emelec
- Relegated: LDU Quito, Técnico Universitario

=== Serie B ===
- Winner: LDU Portoviejo (5th title)
- Promoted: LDU Portoviejo, Delfín
- Relegated: Panamá

=== Segunda ===
- Winner: UDJ Quinindé
- Promoted: UDJ Quinindé

== Clubs in international competitions ==
Team	2000 Copa Libertadores	2000 Copa Merconorte
Barcelona	N/A	Eliminated in the First Stage
El Nacional	Eliminated in the Round of 16	Eliminated in the First Stage
Emelec	Eliminated in the First Stage	Eliminated in the Semifinals
LDU Quito	Eliminated in the First Stage	N/A

== National teams ==
=== Senior team ===
The Ecuador national team played in sixteen matches in 2000: ten FIFA World Cup qualifiers and six friendlies.

==== 2002 FIFA World Cup qualifiers ====
Qualification for the 2002 FIFA World Cup began in 2000.

29 March 2000
12:00

Ecuador	2 – 0	Venezuela
Delgado 18'; Aguinaga 57'	(Report)

Estadio de Liga Deportiva Universitaria, Quito
Attendance: 37,288
Referee: Eduardo Gamboa (Chile)

26 April 2000
21:50

Brazil	3 – 2	Ecuador
Rivaldo 18', 51'; Zago 43'	(Report)	Aguinaga 12' de la Cruz 75'

Estádio do Morumbi, São Paulo
Attendance: 64,738
Referee: Henry Cervantes (Colombia)

3 June 2000
18:15

Paraguay	3 – 1	Ecuador
Toledo 10'; Brizuela 42', 63'	(Report)	Graziani 87'

Estadio Defensores del Chaco, Asunción
Attendance: 22,000
Referee: Gustavo Gallesio Graco (Uruguay)

29 June 2000
16:00

Ecuador	2 – 1	Peru
Chalá 14'; Hurtado 51'	(Report)	Pajuelo 73'

Estadio Olímpico Atahualpa, Quito
Attendance: 40,167
Referee: Carlos Eugênio Simon (Brazil)

19 July 2000
21:00

Argentina	2 – 0	Ecuador
Crespo 29'; C. López 49'	(Report)

River Plate Stadium, Buenos Aires
Attendance: 44,199
Referee: Daniel Bello (Uruguay)

25 July 2000
16:00

Ecuador	0 – 0	Colombia
	(Report)

Estadio Olímpico Atahualpa, Quito
Attendance: 37,617
Referee: Ubaldo Aquino (Paraguay)

16 August 2000
16:00

Ecuador	2 – 0	Bolivia
Delgado 17', 59'	(Report)

Estadio de Liga Deportiva Universitaria, Quito
Attendance: 25,000
Referee: Luis Solórzano (Venezuela)

3 September 2000
15:00

Uruguay	4 – 0	Ecuador
Magallanes 15'; Silva 37'; Olivera 50'; Cedres 86'	(Report)

Estadio Centenario, Montevideo
Attendance: 62,000
Referee: Henry Cervantes (Colombia)

==== Friendlies ====
12 January 2000

Iran	2 – 1	Ecuador
Daei 26'; Mousavi 70'		Cubero 87'

LA Memorial Coliseum, Los Angeles
Attendance: 34,289
Referee: Ricardo Valenzuela (United States)

27 January 2000

Honduras	1 – 1	Ecuador
Martínez 90'		Graziani 10'

Estadio Olímpico Metropolitano, San Pedro Sula
Attendance: 12,000
Referee: Evaristo Soriano (Honduras)

8 March 2000

Ecuador	1 – 3	Honduras
E. Hurtado 24'		Cárcamo 54', 63'; Velásquez 90'

La Casa Blanca, Quito
Attendance: 1,000
Referee: Segundo Díaz (Ecuador)

25 June 2000

Ecuador	5 – 0	Panama
Delgado 22', 34'; Kaviedes 25', 44', 55'

Estadio Olímpico Atahualpa, Quito
Attendance: 2,000
Referee: Luis Vasco (Ecuador)

11 August 2000

Panama	0 – 0	Ecuador

Estadio Rommel Fernández, Panama City
Referee: Hugo León Guajardo (Mexico)

20 September 2000

Mexico	2 – 0	Ecuador
Borgetti 10'; Ruiz 59'

Qualcomm Stadium, San Diego
Referee: Kevin Stott (United States)

== Notes ==
1.Ecuador fielded its Olympic team, but the match is a full FIFA international.
