= Eduardo Espinel =

Uruguayan footballer and manager (born 1972)

Personal information
- Full name: Eduardo Fabián Espinel Porley
- Date of birth: 28 June 1972 (age 54)
- Place of birth: Cardona, Uruguay
- Height: 1.80 m (5 ft 11 in)
- Position: Centre back

Team information
- Current team: CD Olimpia (manager)

Senior career*
Years	Team	Apps	(Gls)
- Cardona Wanderers
- Unión
- Artesano
- Larrañaga
- Colón FC
1999–2005	Plaza Colonia		

Managerial career
- Unión (youth)
- 2008–2009: Unión
- 2010: Rodó
- 2014–2016: Plaza Colonia
- 2016–2017: Santiago Wanderers
- 2018: Montevideo Wanderers
- 2019: Rampla Juniors
- 2019–2020: Guabirá
- 2021–2022: Plaza Colonia
- 2023: Cerro Largo
- 2023–2024: Racing Montevideo
- 2025–: CD Olimpia
- * Club domestic league appearances and goals

Eduardo Fabián Espinel Porley (born 28 June 1972) is a Uruguayan football manager and former player who played as a defender. He is the current manager of Honduran club CD Olimpia.

== Honours ==
=== Manager ===
Plaza Colonia

- Uruguayan Primera División: 2016 Clausura

C.D. Olimpia

- Honduran Liga Nacional: 2025 Clausura
