= C.A. Cerro =

Uruguayan football club

Cerro
- Full name: Club Atlético Cerro
- Nicknames: Villeros; Albicelestes; Cerrenses
- Founded: 1 December 1922; 103 years ago
- Ground: Estadio Luis Tróccoli, Montevideo, Uruguay
- Capacity: 25,000
- Chairman: Alfredo Jaureguiverry
- Manager: Tabaré Silva
- League: Liga AUF Uruguaya
- 2025: Liga AUF Uruguaya, 10th of 16
- Website: cacerro.com
Home colours	Away colours

Club Atlético Cerro, usually known simply as Cerro, is a Uruguayan professional football club based in Montevideo that currently plays in the Uruguayan Primera División. Founded in 1922, the club plays its home games at Estadio Luis Tróccoli.

Uruguay's second most important derby is played between Cerro and Rampla Juniors, called "Clásico de la Villa". It is only behind the Uruguayan Clásico between Peñarol and Nacional.

== History ==
The club was founded on 1 December 1922. The Uruguayan Segunda División was founded in 1942, and Cerro was one of its founders. It spent five years there, and was promoted to the Primera División in 1947, where it stayed for 50 consecutive years until 1997, when the club was deducted points due to an incident with Nacional fans.

Cerro came close to winning the league title in 1960. It finished runner-up to Peñarol, and lost in a heated final to them 3–1. Cerro was considered as Uruguay's third biggest club in the 1960s, because they finished third in the league four consecutive years between 1965 and 1968.

In 1963, Cerro had an international tour through Europe. Their first match was played on 23 May in Romania, a 2–0 loss against Progresul București. Their next match was a 2–0 win against Ştiinţa Timişoara. On 9 June Cerro beat Chornomorets Odesa 2–0; Chernomorets had beat Inter Milan and Flamengo, so this was seen as a very unexpected result. On 14 July Cerro began their tour in South Africa with a match against a local Durban side, winning 2–1. Three days later they beat Cape Town FC 4–0, and on 20 July they drew the South African national team 2–2. Their tour ended with a 3–0 win against the Rhodesia national team.

By defeating Defensor Sporting in a league play-off in December 1994, Cerro qualified for the 1995 Copa Libertadores, their first time participating in the competition. The Estadio Luis Tróccoli was renovated to meet the regulations, including the construction of four lighting poles. Cerro had one victory in the campaign, defeating Argentine club Independiente 1–0 at home, and finished last in the group stage.

Cerro was relegated after finishing second to last in the 2005–06 Uruguayan Primera División, but won the 2006–07 second division and made an immediate return.

After winning the 2009 Liguilla Pre-Libertadores, Cerro qualified for their second Copa Libertadores in their history: the 2010 Copa Libertadores. At home they played in the Estadio Centenario and the Estadio Atilio Paiva Olivera. The club finished third in their group, with 2 wins, 2 draws, and 2 losses.

Cerro participated in the 2017 Copa Libertadores, where they were eliminated in the second qualifying stage by Chilean club Unión Española.

The following year, the club participated in the 2018 Copa Sudamericana, its first ever Copa Sudamericana appearance. Cerro began the tournament by beating Peruvian club Sport Rosario 0–2 on aggregate in the first stage. It was eliminated in the second stage by Brazilian club Bahia 3–1 on aggregate (2–0 and 1–1).

Cerro participated in the Copa Sudamericana again for the 2019 edition, being eliminated by Montevideo Wanderers in the second stage.

== Imported to USA ==
Cerro was one of the clubs imported to the United Soccer Association, a former professional soccer league featuring teams from the United States and Canada; the club played as the New York Skyliners. The league survived only one season (1967). All the teams in the league were imported from Europe and South America.

== Titles ==
=== Professional ===
- Segunda División Profesional (3): 1946, 1998, Apertura 2006
- Liguilla Pre-Libertadores (1): 2009
- Campeonato Presentación (1): 1986
- Torneo Integración (1): 1993

=== Friendly / Amateur ===
- Segunda División Amateur (2): 1940, 1941
- Tercera Extra de FUF (1): 1923
- División Intermedia de FUF (1): 1924
- Copa Montevideo (1): (1985)

== Performance in CONMEBOL competitions ==
- Copa Libertadores: 3 appearances

1995: First Round
2010: Second Round
2017: Qualifying stages

- Copa Sudamericana: 2 appearances

2018: Second Stage
2019: Second Stage

== Current squad ==
As of 22 March, 2026

Note: Flags indicate national team as defined under FIFA eligibility rules; some limited exceptions apply. Players may hold more than one non-FIFA nationality.

No.	Pos.	Nation	Player
3	DF	URU	Ariel Lima (on loan from Defensor)
4	DF	URU	Mateo Argüello
5	MF	ARG	Alejo Macelli
6	DF	URU	Francisco Bregante (on loan from Liverpool (M))
7	FW	URU	Alejandro Severo (on loan from Racing Montevideo)
8	MF	URU	Agustín Miranda
9	FW	URU	Bruno Morales
10	MF	URU	Brahian Alemán
12	GK	URU	Yonatan Irrazábal
13	MF	URU	Brian Quinteros (on loan from Nacional)
14	FW	URU	Emiliano Rodríguez
15	FW	URU	Alan Zamurio
16	DF	ARG	Juan Guasone (on loan from Estudiantes)
17	DF	URU	Gianni Rodríguez
18	FW	URU	Nahuel Sena
19	MF	URU	Emiliano Sosa

No.	Pos.	Nation	Player
20	DF	ARG	Facundo Butti
21	FW	URU	Axel Méndez (on loan from Nacional)
22	DF	URU	Damián Suárez
23	DF	URU	Martìn Farías
24	DF	ARG	Iván Valenzuela
25	GK	URU	Fabrizio Correa
27	FW	URU	Cristian Barros
28	FW	URU	Augusto Cambón (on loan from Defensor)
29	FW	URU	Santiago Paiva
30	FW	PER	Jeison Cubas
31	MF	URU	Jairo Amaro
32	MF	URU	Rodrigo Mederos (on loan from Nacional)
33	FW	URU	Tiago Rijo (on loan from Nacional)
35	MF	URU	Pablo Nongoy (on loan from Peñarol)
40	GK	URU	Diego Capdevila
44	DF	URU	Emanuel Carlos

=== Out on loan ===
Note: Flags indicate national team as defined under FIFA eligibility rules; some limited exceptions apply. Players may hold more than one non-FIFA nationality.

No. / Pos. / Nation / Player; — / DF / URU / Simón Bentancur (at Nacional B until 31 December 2024)	No. / Pos. / Nation / Player; — / DF / URU / Maximiliano Rao (at Oriental until 31 December 2024)

== Managerial history ==
- (Uruguay) Washington Etchamendi
- (Uruguay) Enrique Fernández
- (Uruguay) José Sasía
- (Uruguay) Ondino Viera (1965)
- (Uruguay) Gerardo Pelusso (1993–95)
- (Uruguay) Jorge González (Jan 1, 1998 – Dec 31, 2001)
- (Uruguay) Gerardo Pelusso (Jan 1, 2003 – Dec 31, 2003)
- (Uruguay) Roland Marcenaro (Jan 20, 2004 – June 24, 2004)
- (Uruguay) (Peru) Julio César Balerio (May 16, 2005 – March 5, 2006)
- (Uruguay) Julio Acuña (March 6, 2006 – Dec 31, 2006)
- (Uruguay) Jorge González (Aug 1, 2006 – June 30, 2008)
- (Uruguay) Pablo Repetto (July 1, 2008 – Feb 25, 2009)
- (Uruguay) Richard Martínez (interim) (Feb 2009)
- (Uruguay) Eduardo Acevedo (Feb 2009 – Aug 09)
- (Uruguay) Guillermo Sanguinetti (Aug 13, 2009 – Dec 2, 2009)
- (Uruguay) Pablo Repetto (Dec 15, 2009 – May 23, 2010)
- (Uruguay) Alejandro Apud (May 26, 2010 – Feb 15, 2011)
- (Uruguay) Ricardo "Tato" Ortíz (Feb 17, 2011 – Dec 21, 2011)
- (Uruguay) Hugo Parga (Dec 28, 2011 – May 3, 2012)
- (Uruguay) Gabriel Camacho (May 3, 2012 – July 4, 2012)
- (Uruguay) Ricardo "Tato" Ortíz (July 5, 2012 – Feb 26, 2013)
- (Uruguay) Danilo Baltierra (Feb 27, 2013 – Nov 19, 2013)
- (Uruguay) Pablo Alonso (Nov 21, 2013 – March 2, 2014)
- (Argentina) Pablo Rodríguez (March 5, 2014 – Jul 1 2015)
- (Uruguay) Eduardo Acevedo (Jul 1, 2015 – Dec 31, 2015)
- (Uruguay) Gustavo Ferrín 2016
- (Uruguay) José Puente 2016
- (Colombia) Diego Barragán 2017
- (Argentina) José Basualdo 2017
- (Uruguay) Fernando Correa 2018
- (Uruguay) Jorge González 2019
- (Uruguay) Richard Martínez 2019
- (Uruguay) Santiago Kalemkerian (interim) 2019
- (Uruguay) Julio César Antúnez 2019
- (Uruguay) Fernando Gentile (interim) 2019
- (Uruguay) Nathaniel Revetria 2020
- (Uruguay) Juan Jacinto Rodríguez 2020–2021
- (Argentina) Rolando Carlen 2021
- (Uruguay) Walter Pandiani 2021–2022
- (Uruguay) Edgardo Adinolfi 2022
- (Uruguay) Danielo Núñez 2022–2023
- (Uruguay) Héctor Burguez (interim) 2023
- (Uruguay) Gustavo Ferreyra 2023
- (Uruguay) Damián Santín 2023
- (Uruguay) Ignacio Pallas 2024
- (Uruguay) Tabaré Silva 2025–
