= Racing Club de Montevideo =

Uruguayan association football club

Racing de Montevideo
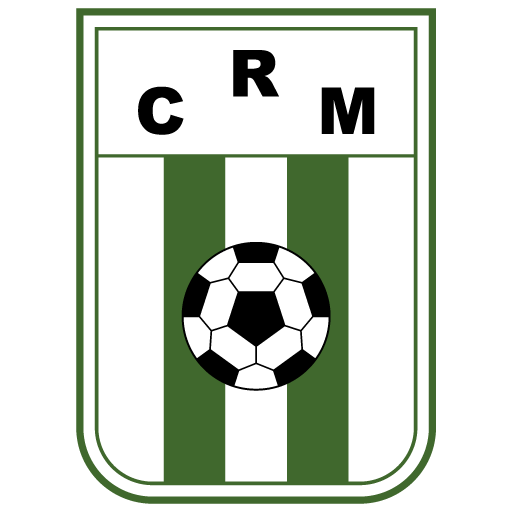
- Full name: Racing Club de Montevideo SAD
- Nicknames: La Escuelita; Racinguistas; Cerveceros
- Founded: April 6, 1919; 107 years ago
- Ground: Estadio Osvaldo Roberto
- Capacity: 8,500
- Owner: Red&Gold Football
- Chairman: Washington Lizardo
- Manager: Cristian Chambian
- League: Liga AUF Uruguaya
- 2025: Liga AUF Uruguaya, 7th of 16
- Website: racingclub.com.uy
Home colours	Away colours	Third colours

Racing Club de Montevideo is a professional football club from Montevideo in Uruguay. It currently participates in the Uruguayan Primera División since winning the Torneo Competencia in 2022.

Racing CM is known as "La Escuelita" (The Little School) due to the high standard of players that have emerged from their teams. Racing is one of Uruguay's traditional teams, in terms of victories and fans. Recently, Racing has faced economic problems and struggled to remain consistent and perform well at the Uruguayan League. This drove the club toward economic reorganization and a transformation into a sports corporation (SAD), as is customary in Europe. An associated investment program created the basis for sporting promotion to Uruguay's first division in 2022.

In the 22/23 season, the promoted team qualified for the qualifying round of the Copa Sudamericana at the first attempt. Following this change, Red&Gold Football, a joint venture between German Bundesliga club Bayern Munich and American Major League Soccer (MLS) club Los Angeles FC, became the new majority shareholder in the club, driving further investment into the club's infrastructure in order to further expand and improve the existing foundations.

Racing's main rival is Fénix, with whom they contest the Clásico del Oeste.

== Performance in CONMEBOL competitions ==
- Copa Libertadores: 1 appearance

2010: Second Stage

- Copa Sudamericana: 3 appearances

2024: Knockout Stage
2025: Group Stage
2026: First Stage

== Players ==
=== Current squad ===
As of 22 March 2026

Note: Flags indicate national team as defined under FIFA eligibility rules; some limited exceptions apply. Players may hold more than one non-FIFA nationality.

No.	Pos.	Nation	Player
1	GK	URU	Facundo Machado
2	DF	URU	Facundo Parada
3	DF	URU	Ramiro Brazionis
4	DF	URU	Guillermo Cotugno
5	MF	URU	Juan Bosca
7	MF	URU	José Varela
8	MF	URU	Felipe Cairus
9	FW	URU	Hugo Silveira
11	FW	URU	Franco Suárez
12	GK	URU	Federico Varese
13	DF	ARG	Felipe Álvarez
14	MF	URU	Erik De Los Santos
15	DF	ARG	Diego Cheuquepal
16	MF	URU	Esteban Da Silva
17	DF	URU	Robinson Ferreira

No.	Pos.	Nation	Player
18	FW	ARG	Tomás Habib
19	FW	URU	Rodrigo Dudok
20	FW	ARG	Agustín Kahl
21	MF	URU	Agustín Álvarez (on loan from Montevideo City Torque)
22	FW	URU	Thiago Fernández
23	FW	URU	Nicolás Sosa
24	MF	ARG	Juan Pérez
26	FW	URU	Sebastián da Silva
27	MF	URU	Lucca Loprete
29	DF	URU	Facundo González (on loan from Nacional)
37	MF	URU	Yuri Oyarzo
39	MF	URU	Álex Vázquez
40	MF	ARG	Axel Atum (on loan from Estudiantes)
77	FW	ARG	Bautista Tomatis
81	FW	ARG	Iván Manzur

=== Out on loan ===
Note: Flags indicate national team as defined under FIFA eligibility rules; some limited exceptions apply. Players may hold more than one non-FIFA nationality.

No.	Pos.	Nation	Player
1	GK	URU	Renzo Bacchia (at CA Cerro 31 December 2025)
2	DF	URU	Hugo Magallanes (at Everton 31 December 2025)
11	FW	URU	Pablo Viudez (at Oriental 31 December 2025)
21	FW	URU	Sebastián Sosa (at Everton 31 December 2025)

No.	Pos.	Nation	Player
33	FW	URU	Rodrigo Rey (at Oriental 31 December 2025)
55	DF	ECU	Oscar Quiñónez (at Independiente del Valle until 31 December 2025)
—	DF	URU	Maximiliano Pinela (at Venados)

== Notable coaches ==
- (Uruguay) Julio "Cascarilla" Morales (1983–1987)
- (Uruguay) Ricardo "Tato" Ortíz (1 July 1992 – 31 December 1992)
- (Uruguay) Adolfo Barán (1 July 1998 – 30 June 1999)
- (Uruguay) Gerardo Pelusso (1 January 2000 – 31 December 2000)
- (Uruguay) Julio Acuña (17 April 2002 – 31 December 2002), (1 January 2007 – 1 July 2007)
- (Uruguay) Eduardo Favaro (1 August 2007 – 27 December 2007)
- (Uruguay) José Puente (1 January 2008 – 31 December 2008)
- (Uruguay) Juan Verzeri (1 July 2008 – 6 May 2010)
- (Uruguay) José Puente (2010)
- (Uruguay) Álvaro Regueira (2010)
- (Uruguay) Edgardo Arias (2010–2011)
- (Uruguay) Osvaldo Streccia (2011)
- (Uruguay) Jorge Giordano (2011–2012)
- (Uruguay) Miguel Angel Piazza (2012–2013)
- (Uruguay) Juan Tejera (2013)
- (Uruguay) Rosario Martínez (2013)
- (Uruguay) Mauricio Larriera (2014)
- Pablo Alonso (2015)
- Santiago Ostolaza (2015)
- Sebastián Taramasco (2016)
- Julio Comesaña (2016)
- Ney Morales (2016–2017)
- Pablo Peirano (2017)
- Rodrigo López (2018)
- Juan Ramón Tejera (2018–2019)
- Alejandro Apud (2019)
- Eduardo Favaro (2019)
- Gustavo Biscayzacú (2020)
- Martín García (2020)
- Damián Santín (2021–2022)
- Gustavo Fermani (2023)
- Eduardo Espinel (2023–2024)
- Darío Rodríguez (2025)
- Cristian Chambian (2025)

== Titles ==
- Torneo Apertura: 1

2026

- Segunda División: 6

1955, 1958, 1974, 1989, 2008, 2022

- Divisional Intermedia: 2

1923, 1929

== Other teams ==
Racing Club de Montevideo also has a esports division, with a squad of FIFA video game series, competing in the championship organized by the Uruguayan Virtual Football Federation.
