= 2022 Under-20 Intercontinental Cup =

Peñarol	Benfica
(Uruguay)	(Portugal)
0	1
- Date: 21 August 2022
- Venue: Estadio Centenario, Montevideo
- Referee: Derlis López (Paraguay)
- Attendance: 40,579
- Weather: Sunny; 15 °C (59 °F)

The 2022 Under-20 Intercontinental Cup (Spanish: Sub-20 Intercontinental 2022) was the inaugural edition of the UEFA–CONMEBOL Under-20 Intercontinental Cup, a football match organised by CONMEBOL and UEFA between the winners of the U-20 Copa Libertadores and UEFA Youth League. CONMEBOL was in charge of the main organization of this edition.

The Under-20 Intercontinental Cup was officially launched on 2 June 2022 as part of the UEFA–CONMEBOL memorandum of understanding. It was decided that the first edition would be played in Uruguay as it was an initiative of Peñarol and CONMEBOL, with the next edition to be played in Europe and so on.

The single match was played on 21 August 2022 at Estadio Centenario in Montevideo, Uruguay, between Uruguayan team Peñarol, the 2022 U-20 Copa Libertadores champions, and Portuguese team Benfica, the 2021–22 UEFA Youth League champions.

Benfica beat Peñarol 1–0, becoming the first ever winners of the Under-20 Intercontinental Cup.

== Background ==
This was the first meeting between Peñarol and Benfica in the under-20 category. However, the senior teams of both clubs have faced four times. They played three matches for the 1961 Intercontinental Cup; the first of which was won 1–0 by Benfica on 4 September 1961 at Estádio da Luz in Lisbon, the second was won 5–0 by Peñarol on 17 September 1961 at Estadio Centenario in Montevideo. The third, also held at Estadio Centenario, was a play-off of the previous two and was won by Peñarol with a 2–1 score on 19 September 1961. The last match between Peñarol and Benfica was on 29 August 1971 for the Ramón de Carranza Trophy, which was won 3–1 by Benfica.

== Teams ==
Team	Qualification
(Uruguay) Peñarol	2022 U-20 Copa Libertadores champions
(Portugal) Benfica	2021–22 UEFA Youth League champions

== Pre-match ==
=== Officials ===
The refereeing team was appointed by the Referees Committees of CONMEBOL and UEFA; only referees in the FIFA International Referees List were eligible (Regulations articles 28 and 29). On 12 August 2022, CONMEBOL announced the refereeing team with Paraguayan official Derlis López as the referee for the match. López had been a FIFA referee since 2019. He was joined by four of his fellow countrymen, including assistant referees Roberto Cañete and José Villagra, with José Méndez serving as the fourth official, Germán Delfino acted as the video assistant referee (VAR) and Maximiliano Del Yesso was the assistant VAR official (AVAR), both from Argentina.

=== Squads ===
Each team had to submit their list of 22 players (at least two of whom must have been goalkeepers) to their respective confederation by 17 August 2022, 19:00 UTC−3 (UYT) or 24:00 UTC+2 (UTC+2). Only players born on or after 1 January 2002 were eligible to compete. Teams were permitted to make player replacements in cases of serious injuries up to 24 hours prior the start of the match (Regulations articles 26 and 27).

Peñarol announced its squad on 18 August, which included forwards Máximo Alonso and Brian Mansilla, midfielder Nicolás Rossi and defender Matías González, all of them with appearances in the Peñarol's senior team.

Benfica announced its squad on 19 August, which did not include forward Henrique Araújo, who scored 3 goals in the 2021–22 UEFA Youth League final, but included defender Tomás Araújo and winger Pedro Santos, all of them being considered in the main team by coach Roger Schmidt.

== Match ==
=== Details ===
21 August 2022
16:30 UTC−3

Peñarol (Uruguay)	0–1	(Portugal) Benfica
	CONMEBOL; UEFA	Semedo 69'

Estadio Centenario, Montevideo
Attendance: 40,579
Referee: Derlis López (Paraguay)

Peñarol	Benfica

GK	12	(Uruguay) Randall Rodríguez
RB	2	(Uruguay) Joaquín Ferreira
CB	6	(Uruguay) Matías González
CB	3	(Uruguay) Agustín Rodríguez
LB	5	(Uruguay) Mathías De Ritis (c)
CM	14	(Uruguay) Damián García	(yellow card) 52'
CM	18	(Uruguay) Braulio Guisolfo		(substituted off) 73'
RW	16	(Uruguay) Nicolás Rossi
AM	19	(Uruguay) Santiago Homenchenko		(substituted off) 89'
LW	15	(Uruguay) Máximo Alonso		(substituted off) 79'
CF	9	(Uruguay) Óscar Cruz		(substituted off) 73'
Substitutes:
GK	1	(Uruguay) Kevin Morgan
DF	4	(Uruguay) Luciano Fernández
DF	17	(Uruguay) Alexis Piegas
DF	22	(Uruguay) Thiago Espinosa
MF	8	(Uruguay) Ademir Silva
MF	10	(Uruguay) Matías Ferreira		(substituted on) 73'
MF	11	(Uruguay) Brian Mansilla		(substituted on) 79'
MF	20	(Uruguay) Mateo Carrizo		(substituted on) 89'
MF	21	(Uruguay) Santiago Álvez
FW	7	(Uruguay) Diego Méndez
FW	13	(Uruguay) Santiago Díaz		(substituted on) 73'
Manager:
(Uruguay) Juan Manuel Olivera

GK	24	(Portugal) Samuel Soares
RB	71	(Portugal) João Tomé		(substituted off) 86'
CB	44	(Albania) Adrian Bajrami
CB	62	(France) Lenny Lacroix
LB	65	(Portugal) Rafael Rodrigues (c)
CM	73	(Italy) Cher Ndour		(substituted off) 74'
CM	74	(Slovenia) Žan Jevšenak	(yellow card) 81'	(substituted off) 86'
CM	87	(Portugal) João Neves
RF	52	(Portugal) Henrique Pereira		(substituted off) 74'
CF	51	(Portugal) João Resende		(substituted off) 64'
LF	96	(Portugal) Diego Moreira
Substitutes:
GK	75	(Portugal) André Gomes
GK	92	(Portugal) Pedro Souza
DF	78	(Portugal) Francisco Domingues		(substituted on) 86'
DF	82	(Portugal) Martim Ferreira
MF	60	(Portugal) Nuno Félix	(yellow card) 90+5'	(substituted on) 86'
MF	76	(Portugal) Martim Neto	(yellow card) 90+3'	(substituted on) 74'
MF	79	(Portugal) Diogo Nascimento
MF	86	(Portugal) Diogo Prioste
FW	46	(Portugal) Gerson Sousa		(substituted on) 74'
FW	90	(Portugal) Luís Semedo		(substituted on) 64'
FW	97	(Portugal) Ricardo Nóbrega
Manager:
(Portugal) Luís Castro

Assistant referees:
Roberto Cañete (Paraguay)
José Villagra (Paraguay)
Fourth official:
José Méndez (Paraguay)
Video assistant referee:
Germán Delfino (Argentina)
Assistant video assistant referee:
Maximiliano Del Yesso (Argentina)

Match rules:

- 90 minutes
- Extra time would not be played
- Penalty shoot-out if tied after 90 minutes
- Eleven named substitutes
- Maximum of five substitutions (Note: Each team was given only three opportunities to make substitutions, excluding substitutions made at half-time.)
