= 2024 Campeonato Uruguayo Primera División =

121st season of the top-tier football league in Uruguay

Campeonato Uruguayo Primera División
- Season: 2024
- Dates: 16 February – 2 December 2024
- Champions: Peñarol (52nd title)
- Relegated: Rampla Juniors; Fénix; Deportivo Maldonado
- Copa Libertadores: Peñarol; Nacional; Boston River; Defensor Sporting
- Copa Sudamericana: Cerro Largo; Danubio; Racing; Montevideo Wanderers
- Matches: 295
- Goals: 723 (2.45 per match)
- Top goalscorer: Leonardo Fernández (16 goals)
- Biggest home win: Defensor Sporting 5–0 Cerro (25 February)
- Biggest away win: Danubio 0–6 Nacional (13 July); Fénix 0–6 Nacional (13 November)
- Highest scoring: Nacional 6–2 Rampla Juniors (20 April); Miramar Misiones 3–5 Danubio (28 April)

The 2024 Campeonato Uruguayo de Primera División was the 121st season of the Liga Profesional de Primera División, Uruguay's top-flight football league, and the 94th in which it is professional. The season, which was named "100 años de Colombes", began on 16 February and ended on 2 December 2024.

Peñarol were the champions, winning their fifty-second league title after winning both the Torneo Apertura and the Torneo Clausura, as well as topping the season's aggregate table, which ensured that the championship playoff would not be played. They clinched the title after beating Fénix 3–1 on the final round of the Torneo Clausura played on 1 December. Liverpool were the defending champions.

== Teams ==
16 teams competed in the season: the top thirteen teams in the relegation table of the 2023 season as well as three promoted teams from the Segunda División. The three lowest placed teams in the relegation table of the 2023 season (Montevideo City Torque, Plaza Colonia and La Luz) were relegated to the Segunda División for the 2024 season. They were replaced by the Segunda División champions Miramar Misiones, runners-up Progreso, and the winners of the promotion play-offs Rampla Juniors.

Miramar Misiones, Progreso and Rampla Juniors returned to the top flight after nine, two and four seasons, respectively. On the other hand, La Luz were relegated after one season, Montevideo City Torque were relegated after four seasons and Plaza Colonia returned to the second tier after five seasons.

=== Stadiums and locations ===
Locations of the 2024 season teams outside Montevideo.
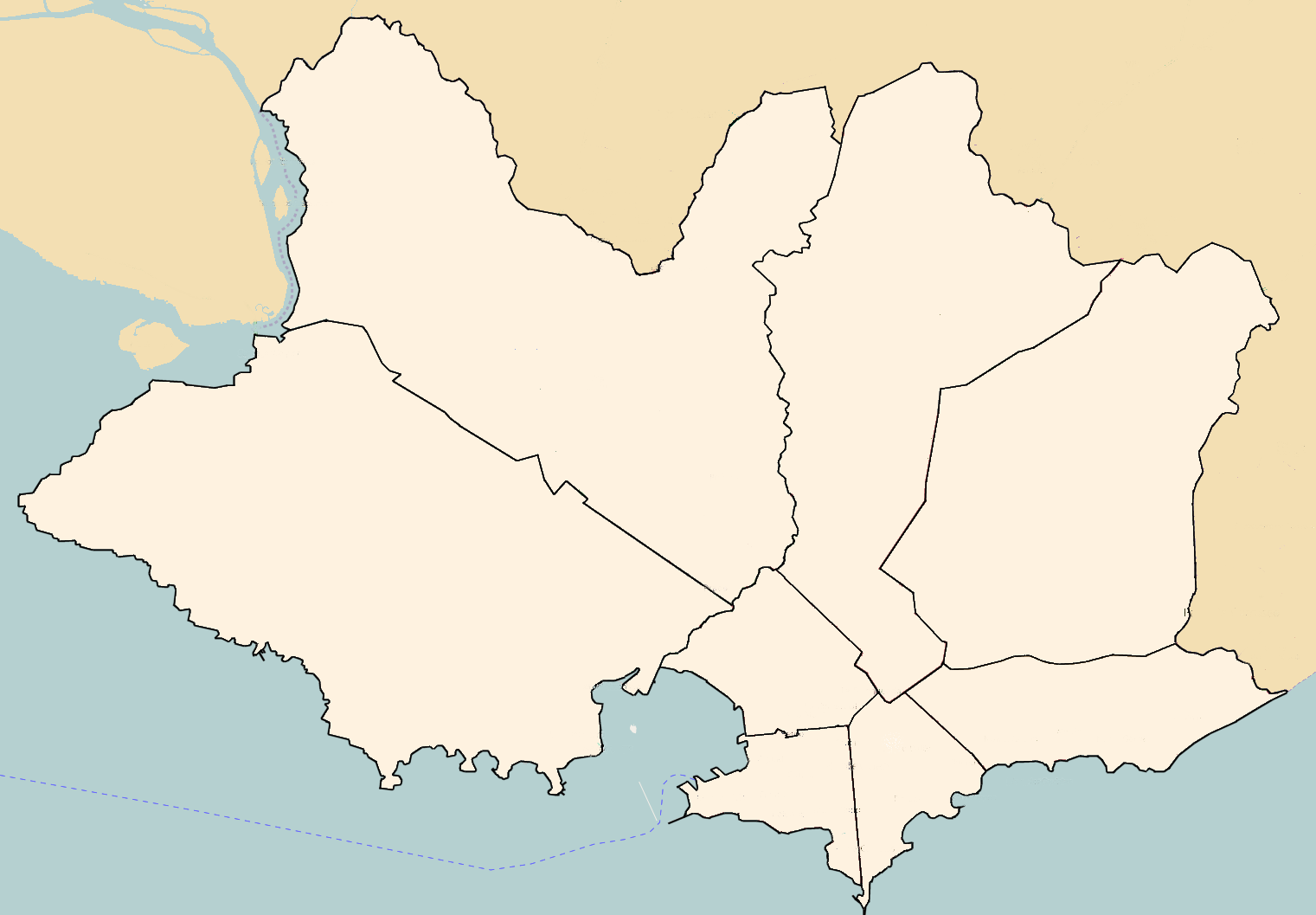
Locations of the 2024 Primera División teams within Montevideo.

Club	City	Stadium	Capacity
Boston River	Florida	Campeones Olímpicos	5,124
Cerro	Montevideo	Luis Tróccoli	25,000
Cerro Largo	Melo	Antonio Ubilla	9,000
Danubio	Montevideo	Jardines del Hipódromo	18,000
Defensor Sporting	Montevideo	Luis Franzini	18,000
Deportivo Maldonado	Maldonado	Domingo Burgueño Miguel	22,000
Fénix	Montevideo	Parque Capurro	10,000
Liverpool	Montevideo	Belvedere	10,000
Miramar Misiones	Montevideo	Parque Luis Méndez Piana	6,500
Montevideo Wanderers	Montevideo	Parque Alfredo Víctor Viera	11,000
Nacional	Montevideo	Gran Parque Central	34,000
Peñarol	Montevideo	Campeón del Siglo	40,700
Progreso	Montevideo	Parque Abraham Paladino	8,000
Racing	Montevideo	Osvaldo Roberto	8,500
Rampla Juniors	Montevideo	Olímpico	9,500
River Plate	Montevideo	Parque Federico Omar Saroldi	6,000

=== Personnel and kits ===
Team	Manager	Kit maker	Shirt sponsor(s)	
Team	Manager	Kit maker	Main	Other
Boston River	(Brazil) Jadson Viera	Kelme	Asociación Española	List: Front: Cotrans, Schneider, DirecTV; Back: Carnicería Que Locura, El Galleguito, DirecTV, EGA Rutas del Plata; Sleeves: Antel; Sides: None; Shorts: Tiffosi
Cerro	(Uruguay) Ignacio Pallas	MGR Sport	Médica Uruguaya	List: Front: Refrescos Jazz; Back: Refresco Limol, GOL TV, EGA Rutas del Plata; Sleeves: Antel; Sides: Automotora Mar Motors; Shorts: Montevideo Cortinas, A Mano Alimentos Seleccionados, La Farola Pizzeria, Refresco Limol
Cerro Largo	(Uruguay) Danielo Núñez	Concreto Sport	Link-Belt Excavators	List: Front: None; Back: Woslen Agrovial, Decatur Viajes; Sleeves: Antel; Sides: None; Shorts: None
Danubio	(Uruguay) Alejandro Apud	MGR Sport	None	List: Front: None; Back: Grupo Olmos, Asociación Española, EGA Rutas del Plata; Sleeves: Antel; Sides: None; Shorts: Montevideo COMM
Defensor Sporting	(Uruguay) Álvaro Navarro	Puma	Médica Uruguaya	List: Front: Prex; Back: BYD, EGA Rutas del Plata; Sleeves: Antel; Sides: None; Shorts: Montevideo COMM
Deportivo Maldonado	(Argentina) Martín Piñeyro	Joma	Enjoy Punta del Este	List: Front: None; Back: Agua Mineral Nativa; Sleeves: Antel; Sides: DirecTV; Shorts: None
Fénix	(Uruguay) Carlos Britos (Uruguay) Juan Quefan (caretakers)	MGR Sport	Cousa	List: Front: Fagar, Cortiluz Cortinas, CobraTicket; Back: Districad, EGA Rutas del Plata, Asociación Española, El Centro del Kinesiólogo; Sleeves: Antel; Sides: None; Shorts: DT Importaciones
Liverpool	(Uruguay) Joaquín Papa	MGR Sport	Molino Puritas	List: Front: Aída, Suprabond; Back: Del Cebador Yerba Mate, Médica Uruguaya; Sleeves: Antel; Sides: Mann-Filter; Shorts: Barcatti, Schneider
Miramar Misiones	(Uruguay) Walter Pandiani	MGR Sport	Talent Management Associates	List: Front: Cortiluz Cortinas; Back: Amaya Motor, EGA Rutas del Plata; Sleeves: Antel; Sides: None; Shorts: Talent Management Associates, Planet Travel
Montevideo Wanderers	(Uruguay) Antonio Pacheco	Umbro	BYD	List: Front: None; Back: Suprabond; Sleeves: Antel; Sides: CASMU; Shorts: None
Nacional	(Uruguay) Martín Lasarte	Umbro	Antel	List: Front: BBVA; Back: Sarubbi, Assist Card; Sleeves: Turil; Sides: DirecTV; Shorts: Nacional TV+, Rexona
Peñarol	(Uruguay) Diego Aguirre	Puma	Antel	List: Front: None; Back: Sarubbi, Médica Uruguaya, Nuñez Transporte; Sleeves: BBVA; Sides: None; Shorts: Rexona
Progreso	(Uruguay) Carlos Canobbio	MGR Sport	Médica Uruguaya	List: Front: Cortiluz Cortinas; Back: Grupo Gamma, Café Cefa, EGA Rutas del Plata; Sleeves: Antel; Sides: Tankes; Shorts: None
Racing	(Uruguay) Eduardo Espinel	Macron	DirecTV	List: Front: Alfajores Punta Ballena; Back: Claldy, Asociación Española, Ebe Pinturas, EGA Rutas del Plata; Sleeves: Antel; Sides: None; Shorts: None
Rampla Juniors	(Uruguay) Edgar Martínez	MGR Sport	El Clon Supermercados	List: Front: Zureo Software, Discarvi, Tsakos, Cortiluz Cortinas, Schneider; Back: DirecTV, EGA Rutas del Plata, El Rey del Pollo, Etchenique Automóviles; Sleeves: Antel; Sides: Eco Fruticola Abraham J. Ceretta; Shorts: Camblor Bienes Raíces, El Buen Gusto Pastas, Supermercado Mundo Frutal
River Plate	(Uruguay) Francisco Palladino	MGR Sport	Macromercado	List: Front: Silveira Agronegocios; Back: Jetour, EGA Rutas del Plata, CASMU; Sleeves: Antel; Sides: None; Shorts: Confitería Esmeralda, Agua Sirte

=== Managerial changes ===
Team	Outgoing manager	Manner of departure	Date of vacancy	Position in table	Incoming manager	Date of appointment
Torneo Apertura
Defensor Sporting	(Uruguay) Marcelo Méndez	End of contract	7 December 2023	Pre-season	(Uruguay) Martín Varini	7 December 2023
Cerro Largo	(Uruguay) Juan Jacinto Rodríguez	End of caretaker spell	15 December 2023	Pre-season	(Uruguay) Bruno Silva	15 December 2023
Deportivo Maldonado	(Uruguay) Fabián Coito	Mutual agreement	15 December 2023	Pre-season	(Uruguay) Joaquín Boghossian	21 December 2023
Boston River	(Uruguay) Alejandro Apud	Mutual agreement	18 December 2023	Pre-season	(Brazil) Jadson Viera	18 December 2023
Liverpool	(Uruguay) Jorge Bava	Resigned	19 December 2023	Pre-season	(Uruguay) Emiliano Alfaro	21 December 2023
Cerro	(Uruguay) Damián Santín	End of contract	3 January 2024	Pre-season	(Uruguay) Ignacio Pallas	5 January 2024
Rampla Juniors	(Uruguay) Nicolás Vigneri	End of contract	30 January 2024	Pre-season	(Uruguay) Martín García	2 February 2024
Fénix	(Uruguay) Leonel Rocco	Sacked	3 March 2024	12th	(Uruguay) Nicolás Vigneri	4 March 2024
Montevideo Wanderers	(Uruguay) Alejandro Cappuccio	Sacked	7 March 2024	13th	(Uruguay) Antonio Pacheco (Note: Juan Manuel Martínez was the caretaker manager for the Torneo Apertura 4th round match against Deportivo Maldonado.)	9 March 2024
Miramar Misiones	(Uruguay) Leonardo Medina	Sacked	24 March 2024	16th	(Uruguay) Horacio Peralta (Note: Caretaker manager.)	28 March 2024
Rampla Juniors	(Uruguay) Martín García	Mutual agreement	27 March 2024	14th	(Uruguay) Juan Guillermo Castillo	27 March 2024
Miramar Misiones	(Uruguay) Horacio Peralta	End of caretaker spell	6 April 2024	13th	(Argentina) Ricardo Caruso Lombardi	3 April 2024
Rampla Juniors	(Uruguay) Juan Guillermo Castillo	End of caretaker spell	10 April 2024	15th	(Uruguay) Edgar Martínez	10 April 2024
Danubio	(Uruguay) Mario Saralegui	Sacked	15 April 2024	9th	(Uruguay) Alejandro Apud	17 April 2024
Miramar Misiones	(Argentina) Ricardo Caruso Lombardi	Resigned	22 May 2024	16th	(Uruguay) Santiago Kalemkerian	22 May 2024
Miramar Misiones	(Uruguay) Santiago Kalemkerian	End of caretaker spell	27 May 2024	16th	(Uruguay) Walter Pandiani	27 May 2024
Deportivo Maldonado	(Uruguay) Joaquín Boghossian	Sacked	28 May 2024	11th	(Uruguay) Gustavo Díaz	30 May 2024
Torneo Intermedio
Nacional	(Uruguay) Álvaro Recoba	Mutual agreement	10 June 2024	Serie B, 8th	(Uruguay) Martín Lasarte (Note: Rafael García was the caretaker manager for the Torneo Intermedio 2nd round match against Liverpool.)	14 June 2024
River Plate	(Uruguay) Ignacio Ithurralde	Sacked	15 June 2024	Serie A, 5th	(Uruguay) Francisco Palladino	17 June 2024
Cerro Largo	(Uruguay) Bruno Silva	Resigned	3 July 2024	Serie B, 5th	(Uruguay) Juan Jacinto Rodríguez	3 July 2024
Defensor Sporting	(Uruguay) Martín Varini	Resigned	7 July 2024	Serie A, 2nd	(Uruguay) Álvaro Navarro	8 July 2024
Cerro Largo	(Uruguay) Juan Jacinto Rodríguez	End of caretaker spell	27 July 2024	Serie B, 2nd	(Uruguay) Danielo Núñez	25 July 2024
Torneo Clausura
Deportivo Maldonado	(Uruguay) Gustavo Díaz	Mutual agreement	1 October 2024	16th	(Argentina) Martín Piñeyro	2 October 2024
Liverpool	(Uruguay) Emiliano Alfaro	Mutual agreement	6 October 2024	12th	(Uruguay) Gustavo Ferrín	7 October 2024
Liverpool	(Uruguay) Gustavo Ferrín	End of caretaker spell	17 October 2024	14th	(Uruguay) Joaquín Papa	17 October 2024
Fénix	(Uruguay) Nicolás Vigneri	Resigned	14 November 2024	11th	(Uruguay) Carlos Britos (Uruguay) Juan Quefan (Note: Caretaker managers until the end of the season.)	15 November 2024

== Torneo Apertura ==
The Torneo Apertura, named "100 años de la vuelta Olímpica", was the first tournament of the 2024 season. It began on 16 February and ended on 4 June 2024.

=== Standings ===
Pos	Team	Pld	W	D	L	GF	GA	GD	Pts	Qualification
1	Peñarol	15	13	2	0	31	7	+24	41	Qualification for Championship playoff
2	Nacional	15	10	4	1	31	16	+15	34	
3	Defensor Sporting	15	8	4	3	31	17	+14	28	
4	Boston River	15	8	3	4	21	17	+4	27	
5	Progreso	15	7	3	5	25	25	0	24	
6	Cerro Largo	15	6	3	6	16	16	0	21	
7	Racing	15	5	4	6	22	22	0	19	
8	Liverpool	15	4	6	5	22	24	−2	18	
9	Montevideo Wanderers	15	5	3	7	15	20	−5	18	
10	Cerro	15	4	5	6	19	25	−6	17	
11	Deportivo Maldonado	15	4	3	8	14	19	−5	15	
12	Rampla Juniors	15	4	3	8	15	27	−12	15	
13	River Plate	15	3	5	7	20	25	−5	14	
14	Danubio	15	3	5	7	13	19	−6	14	
15	Fénix	15	3	4	8	11	17	−6	13	
16	Miramar Misiones	15	2	5	8	18	28	−10	11	

Source: AUF, Soccerway
Rules for classification: 1) Points, 2) Playoff game, in case two teams are tied for first place.
If there are more than two teams tied in points: 2) Goal difference, 3) Goals for, 4) Head-to-head record, 5) Drawing of lots, 6) Playoff game, in case two teams are still tied for first place.

=== Results ===
Home \ Away	BOR	CRR	CRL	DAN	DFS	DMA	FEN	LIV	MIM	WAN	NAC	PEÑ	PRO	RAC	RAM	RIV
Boston River	—	2–0	—	0–0	2–2	—	—	1–1	3–1	—	1–3	1–3	—	—	—	—
Cerro	—	—	1–1	2–0	—	—	0–0	—	—	1–1	1–2	—	2–3	—	3–0	3–2
Cerro Largo	2–0	—	—	—	—	—	0–0	—	—	—	—	1–2	—	0–2	2–0	—
Danubio	—	—	1–1	—	—	1–1	—	—	—	0–2	—	—	1–1	0–1	1–1	—
Defensor Sporting	—	5–0	3–1	1–0	—	—	—	—	3–0	2–2	3–3	0–2	—	—	—	2–1
Deportivo Maldonado	1–2	3–0	0–1	—	1–0	—	0–1	—	1–2	—	0–2	1–2	—	—	—	—
Fénix	1–2	—	—	1–2	0–2	—	—	1–3	—	1–2	—	0–1	1–0	—	—	0–0
Liverpool	—	0–3	2–1	1–2	1–1	1–2	—	—	2–1	—	1–1	2–2	—	—	1–2	1–1
Miramar Misiones	—	2–2	1–2	3–5	—	—	1–1	—	—	2–0	1–2	—	2–3	—	—	0–0
Montevideo Wanderers	0–2	—	1–0	—	—	0–0	—	2–3	—	—	—	—	2–0	0–1	2–1	—
Nacional	—	—	1–0	1–0	—	—	1–4	—	—	3–0	—	—	0–0	4–2	6–2	2–1
Peñarol	—	3–0	—	2–0	—	—	—	—	2–0	1–0	0–0	—	3–1	—	—	3–0
Progreso	1–0	—	0–1	—	1–4	3–1	—	2–1	—	—	—	—	—	4–3	4–2	—
Racing	1–2	1–1	—	—	1–2	0–1	2–0	2–2	1–1	—	—	1–2	—	—	—	—
Rampla Juniors	0–1	—	—	—	2–1	1–1	1–0	—	1–1	—	—	0–3	—	0–1	—	—
River Plate	1–2	—	2–3	1–0	—	3–1	—	—	—	3–1	—	—	2–2	3–3	0–2	—

Source: AUF, Soccerway
Legend: Blue = home team win; Yellow = draw; Red = away team win.

== Torneo Intermedio ==
The Torneo Intermedio, named "Atilio Narancio", was the second tournament of the 2024 season, played between the Apertura and Clausura tournaments. It consisted of two groups whose composition depended on the final standings of the Torneo Apertura: teams in odd-numbered positions played in Serie A, and teams in even-numbered positions played in Serie B. It started on 8 June and ended on 4 August, and the winners were assured of a berth into the 2025 Copa Sudamericana and the 2025 Supercopa Uruguaya.

=== Serie A ===
Pos	Team	Pld	W	D	L	GF	GA	GD	Pts	Qualification	PEÑ	WAN	DFS	FEN	RIV	PRO	RAC	DMA
1	Peñarol	7	4	2	1	10	5	+5	14	Advance to Torneo Intermedio Final	—	—	1–0	2–0	—	—	1–1	1–1
2	Montevideo Wanderers	7	4	1	2	11	9	+2	13		2–0	—	—	—	1–3	4–2	—	1–0
3	Defensor Sporting	7	3	2	2	7	5	+2	11		—	1–1	—	—	0–1	1–1	—	—
4	Fénix	7	3	1	3	10	9	+1	10		—	3–1	1–2	—	1–0	1–1	—	—
5	River Plate	7	2	2	3	8	9	−1	8		1–3	—	—	—	—	—	2–2	1–1
6	Progreso	7	2	2	3	8	11	−3	8		0–2	—	—	—	1–0	—	3–2	0–1
7	Racing	7	1	3	3	8	10	−2	6		—	0–1	0–1	2–1	—	—	—	—
8	Deportivo Maldonado	7	1	3	3	5	9	−4	6		—	—	0–2	1–3	—	—	1–1	—

Source: AUF, Soccerway
Legend: Blue = home team win; Yellow = draw; Red = away team win.
Rules for classification: 1) Points, 2) Goal difference, 3) Goals for, 4) Head-to-head record, 5) Drawing of lots, 6) Playoff game, in case two teams are tied for first place.

=== Serie B ===
Pos	Team	Pld	W	D	L	GF	GA	GD	Pts	Qualification	NAC	DAN	CRL	CRR	MIM	RAM	BOR	LIV
1	Nacional	7	5	1	1	18	5	+13	16	Advance to Torneo Intermedio Final	—	—	—	—	4–0	1–1	1–0	2–1
2	Danubio	7	4	2	1	11	11	0	14		0–6	—	—	—	—	2–0	—	2–0
3	Cerro Largo	7	3	2	2	6	7	−1	11		0–4	2–2	—	—	—	0–1	—	1–0
4	Cerro	7	3	1	3	8	5	+3	10		3–0	0–0	0–1	—	—	4–1	—	—
5	Miramar Misiones	7	3	1	3	7	10	−3	10		—	2–3	0–0	1–0	—	—	—	—
6	Rampla Juniors	7	2	2	3	8	12	−4	8		—	—	—	—	1–2	—	1–1	3–2
7	Boston River	7	2	1	4	6	8	−2	7		—	1–2	0–2	2–0	2–1	—	—	—
8	Liverpool	7	1	0	6	4	10	−6	3		—	—	—	0–1	0–1	—	1–0	—

Source: AUF, Soccerway
Legend: Blue = home team win; Yellow = draw; Red = away team win.
Rules for classification: 1) Points, 2) Goal difference, 3) Goals for, 4) Head-to-head record, 5) Drawing of lots, 6) Playoff game, in case two teams are tied for first place.

=== Torneo Intermedio Final ===
4 August 2024
15:00 UTC−3

Nacional	1–1	Peñarol
Petit 79'	Report	Fernández 33'
Penalties
Polenta (penalty missed); Petit (penalty scored); Pereyra (penalty scored); Recoba (penalty scored); Castro (penalty missed); Lozano (penalty scored); López (penalty scored); Coates (penalty missed); Báez (penalty scored); Mejía (penalty scored); Polenta (penalty scored)	8–7	(penalty missed) Fernández; (penalty scored) Rodríguez; (penalty scored) Sosa; (penalty missed) Rossi; (penalty scored) Aguerre; (penalty scored) Léo Coelho; (penalty scored) García; (penalty missed) Olivera; (penalty scored) Méndez; (penalty scored) Mayada; (penalty missed) Fernández

Estadio Centenario, Montevideo
Referee: Esteban Ostojich

== Torneo Clausura ==
The Torneo Clausura, named "José Nasazzi", was the third and last tournament of the 2024 season. It began on 16 August and ended on 2 December 2024.

=== Standings ===
Pos	Team	Pld	W	D	L	GF	GA	GD	Pts	Qualification
1	Peñarol	15	12	2	1	32	5	+27	38	Qualification for Championship playoff
2	Nacional	15	11	3	1	37	11	+26	36	
3	Racing	15	7	6	2	16	10	+6	27	
4	Boston River	15	8	2	5	19	15	+4	26	
5	Danubio	15	6	7	2	14	7	+7	25	
6	Cerro Largo	15	6	4	5	15	11	+4	22	
7	Defensor Sporting	15	5	5	5	17	17	0	20	
8	Miramar Misiones	15	4	7	4	11	15	−4	19	
9	Liverpool	15	4	6	5	15	16	−1	18	
10	River Plate	15	5	3	7	15	20	−5	18	
11	Montevideo Wanderers	15	4	5	6	15	20	−5	17	
12	Rampla Juniors	15	4	4	7	12	19	−7	16	
13	Fénix	15	4	2	9	14	28	−14	14	
14	Cerro	15	2	6	7	9	20	−11	12	
15	Deportivo Maldonado	15	2	3	10	12	24	−12	9	
16	Progreso	15	1	5	9	9	24	−15	8	

Source: AUF, Soccerway
Rules for classification: 1) Points, 2) Playoff game, in case two teams are tied for first place.
If there are more than two teams tied in points: 2) Goal difference, 3) Goals for, 4) Head-to-head record, 5) Drawing of lots, 6) Playoff game, in case two teams are still tied for first place.

=== Results ===
Home \ Away	BOR	CRR	CRL	DAN	DFS	DMA	FEN	LIV	MIM	WAN	NAC	PEÑ	PRO	RAC	RAM	RIV
Boston River	—	—	3–0	—	—	1–0	2–0	—	—	3–2	—	—	1–0	1–2	1–0	3–1
Cerro	0–0	—	—	—	1–1	0–0	—	1–3	0–1	—	—	0–5	—	1–1	—	—
Cerro Largo	—	3–1	—	0–0	3–0	1–0	—	0–0	1–2	4–0	0–1	—	2–1	—	—	1–0
Danubio	2–0	0–0	—	—	1–1	—	1–0	1–0	1–0	—	0–0	0–1	—	—	—	3–0
Defensor Sporting	1–2	—	—	—	—	3–1	1–0	2–1	—	—	—	—	3–0	1–2	1–2	—
Deportivo Maldonado	—	—	—	3–1	—	—	—	0–1	—	1–3	—	—	2–2	0–1	1–1	0–1
Fénix	—	1–3	1–0	—	—	1–2	—	—	0–0	—	0–6	—	—	0–2	1–0	—
Liverpool	1–1	—	—	—	—	—	1–2	—	—	1–1	—	—	2–1	1–1	—	—
Miramar Misiones	1–0	—	—	—	0–0	1–0	—	2–2	—	—	—	1–2	—	2–2	0–0	—
Montevideo Wanderers	—	1–0	—	2–2	1–1	—	1–2	—	2–0	—	0–2	0–2	—	—	—	0–1
Nacional	3–1	2–0	—	—	1–1	5–2	—	1–0	5–1	—	—	2–1	—	—	—	—
Peñarol	2–0	—	0–0	—	2–0	2–0	3–1	2–0	—	—	—	—	—	0–0	4–0	—
Progreso	—	0–1	—	0–0	—	—	2–2	—	0–0	0–0	0–3	1–5	—	—	—	2–0
Racing	—	—	0–0	0–0	—	—	—	—	—	0–1	0–2	—	1–0	—	2–1	2–0
Rampla Juniors	—	1–1	2–0	0–2	—	—	—	0–1	—	1–1	2–1	—	2–0	—	—	0–3
River Plate	—	1–0	—	—	0–1	—	4–3	1–1	0–0	—	3–3	0–1	—	—	—	—

Source: AUF, Soccerway
Legend: Blue = home team win; Yellow = draw; Red = away team win.

== Aggregate table ==
Pos	Team	Pld	W	D	L	GF	GA	GD	Pts	Qualification
1	Peñarol (C)	37	29	6	2	73	17	+56	93	Qualification for Copa Libertadores group stage
2	Nacional	37	26	8	3	86	32	+54	86	Qualification for Copa Libertadores group stage
3	Boston River	37	18	6	13	46	40	+6	60	Qualification for Copa Libertadores second stage
4	Defensor Sporting	37	16	11	10	55	39	+16	59	Qualification for Copa Libertadores first stage
5	Cerro Largo	37	15	9	13	37	34	+3	54	Qualification for Copa Sudamericana first stage
6	Danubio	37	13	14	10	38	37	+1	53	Qualification for Copa Sudamericana first stage
7	Racing	37	13	13	11	46	42	+4	52	Qualification for Copa Sudamericana first stage
8	Montevideo Wanderers	37	13	9	15	41	49	−8	48	Qualification for Copa Sudamericana first stage
9	River Plate	37	10	10	17	43	54	−11	40	
10	Miramar Misiones	37	9	13	15	36	53	−17	40	
11	Progreso	37	10	10	17	42	60	−18	40	
12	Liverpool	37	9	12	16	41	50	−9	39	
13	Cerro	37	9	12	16	36	50	−14	39	
14	Rampla Juniors	37	10	9	18	35	58	−23	39	
15	Fénix	37	10	7	20	35	54	−19	37	
16	Deportivo Maldonado	37	7	9	21	31	52	−21	30	

Source: AUF
Rules for classification: 1) Points, 2) Playoff game, in case two teams are tied for first place.
If there are more than two teams tied in points: 2) Goal difference, 3) Goals for, 4) Head-to-head record, 5) Drawing of lots, 6) Playoff game, in case two teams are still tied for first place.
(C) Champions

== Championship playoff ==
Since Peñarol won both the Apertura and Clausura tournaments, they became champions automatically and the championship playoff was not played. Nacional became runners-up as the second-placed team in the aggregate table. Both teams qualified for the 2025 Copa Libertadores group stage.

Primera División
2024 champions
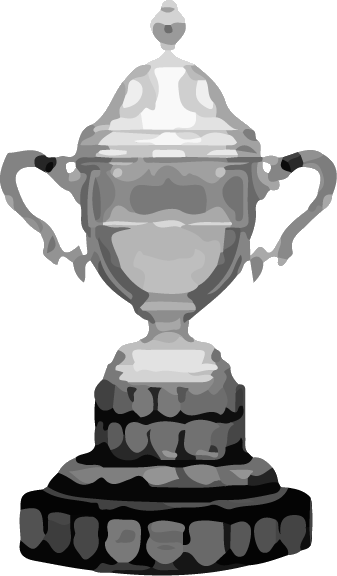

52nd title

== Top scorers ==
Rank	Player	Club	Goals
1	(Uruguay) Leonardo Fernández	Peñarol	16
2	(Uruguay) Bruno Damiani	Boston River	13
3	(Uruguay) Octavio Rivero	Defensor Sporting	12
4	(Uruguay) Alexander Machado	Miramar Misiones	11
4	(Uruguay) Joaquín Lavega	River Plate	11
4	(Uruguay) Nicolás López	Nacional	11
7	(Uruguay) Agustín Alaniz	Racing	10
7	(Uruguay) Sebastián Fernández	Danubio	10
7	(Uruguay) Emiliano Gómez	Boston River	10
7	(Uruguay) Franco López	Progreso	10
7	(Uruguay) Dylan Nandín	Racing	10

Source: AUF

== Relegation ==
Relegation was determined at the end of the season by computing an average of the total of points earned per game over the two most recent seasons: 2023 and 2024. The three teams with the lowest average at the end of the season were relegated to the Segunda División for the following season.

Pos	Team	2023 Pts	2024 Pts	Total Pts	Total Pld	Avg	Relegation
1	Peñarol	69	93	162	74	2.189	
2	Nacional	64	86	150	74	2.027	
3	Defensor Sporting	60	59	119	74	1.608	
4	Liverpool	74	39	113	74	1.527	
5	Cerro Largo	50	54	104	74	1.405	
6	Racing	50	52	102	74	1.378	
7	Danubio	48	53	101	74	1.365	
8	Boston River	41	60	101	74	1.365	
9	Montevideo Wanderers	50	48	98	74	1.324	
10	River Plate	48	40	88	74	1.189	
11	Cerro	43	39	82	74	1.108	
12	Miramar Misiones	—	40	40	37	1.081	
13	Progreso	—	40	40	37	1.081	
14	Rampla Juniors (R)	—	39	39	37	1.054	Relegation to Segunda División
15	Fénix (R)	37	37	74	74	1	Relegation to Segunda División
16	Deportivo Maldonado (R)	43	30	73	74	0.986	Relegation to Segunda División

== Season awards ==
On 22 January 2025 the AUF announced the winners of the season awards, who were chosen by its Technical Staff based on voting by managers and captains of the 16 Primera División teams as well as a group of local sports journalists. On 20 December 2024, 36 players were confirmed to have been nominated for the Public's Player and Team of the Season awards according to their ratings and evaluations by the Technical Staff throughout the season, whilst the shortlists of nominees for the remaining awards were announced six days later.

Award	Winner	Club
Best Player	(Uruguay) Leonardo Fernández	Peñarol
Public's Player (Note: Chosen by public voting on the competition's social network accounts.)	(Uruguay) Leonardo Fernández	Peñarol
Youth Talent	(Uruguay) Damián García	Peñarol
Best Manager	(Uruguay) Diego Aguirre	Peñarol
Best Goal	(Uruguay) Gonzalo Petit (against Peñarol, Torneo Intermedio Final)	Nacional
Best Save	(Panama) Luis Mejía (against Peñarol, Torneo Apertura Round 6)	Nacional
Best Newcomer	(Uruguay) Lucas Sanabria	Nacional
Top Scorer	(Uruguay) Leonardo Fernández (16 goals in 33 games played)	Peñarol
Least beaten goal in regular season	Peñarol (17 goals conceded by Washington Aguerre, Guillermo de Amores and Randall Rodríguez)	
Most minutes on field	(Uruguay) Kevin Dawson (3,240 minutes in 36 games played)	Defensor Sporting
Fair Play Award	Peñarol	
Copa AUF Sin Género (Note: Awarded to the team with the most points in both the men's and women's league tournaments.)	Peñarol	
Best Referee	Esteban Ostojich	
Best Assistant Referee	Andrés Nievas	

Team of the Season
Goalkeeper	Defenders	Midfielders	Forwards
(Uruguay) Washington Aguerre (Peñarol)	(Uruguay) Leandro Lozano (Nacional) (Uruguay) Guzmán Rodríguez (Peñarol) (Uruguay) Javier Méndez (Peñarol) (Uruguay) Juan Rodríguez (Boston River)	(Uruguay) Eduardo Darias (Peñarol) (Uruguay) Damián García (Peñarol) (Uruguay) Leonardo Fernández (Peñarol)	(Uruguay) Nicolás López (Nacional) (Uruguay) Maximiliano Silvera (Peñarol) (Uruguay) Bruno Damiani (Boston River)

== See also ==
- 2024 Uruguayan Segunda División season
- 2024 Copa Uruguay
