= Brian Mansilla =

Uruguayan footballer (born 2002)

Personal information
- Full name: Brian Nicolás Mansilla Islas
- Date of birth: 14 May 2002 (age 24)
- Place of birth: Dolores, Uruguay
- Height: 1.76 m (5 ft 9 in)
- Position: Winger

Team information
- Current team: Arouca
- Number: 24

Youth career
- Peñarol

Senior career*
Years	Team	Apps	(Gls)
2022–2025	Peñarol	36	(1)
2024	→ Defensor Sporting (loan)	32	(4)
2025	→ Arouca (loan)	12	(0)
2025–	Arouca	30	(0)
- * Club domestic league appearances and goals as of 6 November 2026

Brian Nicolás Mansilla Islas (born 14 May 2002) is a Uruguayan professional footballer who plays as a winger for Primeira Liga club Arouca.

== Career ==
Mansilla is a youth academy product of Peñarol. He was part of club's under-20 team which won the 2022 U-20 Copa Libertadores. He made his professional debut for Peñarol on 1 April 2022 in a goalless league draw against Rentistas.

In January 2024, Mansilla joined Defensor Sporting on a season long loan deal. On 15 January 2025, he joined Portuguese club Arouca on a loan deal until the end of the season. Six months later in July, he signed a three-year contract with Arouca.

== Career statistics ==
As of match played 19 September 2026

Appearances and goals by club, season and competition
Club	Season	League			National cup (Note: Includes Copa Uruguay, Taça de Portugal)		Continental		Other		Total	
Club	Season	Division	Apps	Goals	Apps	Goals	Apps	Goals	Apps	Goals	Apps	Goals
Peñarol	2022	UPD	13	1	4	0	2 (Note: Appearances in Copa Libertadores)	0	0	0	19	1
Peñarol	2023	UPD	23	0	1	1	4 (Note: Appearances in Copa Sudamericana)	1	0	0	28	2
Peñarol	Total		36	1	5	1	6	1	0	0	47	3
Defensor Sporting (loan)	2023	UPD	—		4	0	—		—		4	0
Defensor Sporting (loan)	2024	UPD	32	4	5	0	2	1	1 (Note: Appearance in Supercopa Uruguaya)	0	40	5
Defensor Sporting (loan)	Total		32	4	9	0	2	1	1	0	44	5
Arouca (loan)	2024–25	Primeira Liga	12	0	0	0	—		—		12	0
Arouca	2025–26	Primeira Liga	20	0	0	0	—		—		20	0
Arouca	2026–27	Primeira Liga	6	0	0	0	—		—		6	0
Arouca	Total		38	0	0	0	0	0	0	0	38	0
Career total			106	5	14	1	8	2	1	0	129	8

== Honours ==
Peñarol U20

- U-20 Copa Libertadores: 2022

Defensor Sporting

- Copa Uruguay: 2023, 2024
