= Nicolás Rossi (footballer, born 2002) =

Uruguayan footballer (born 2002)

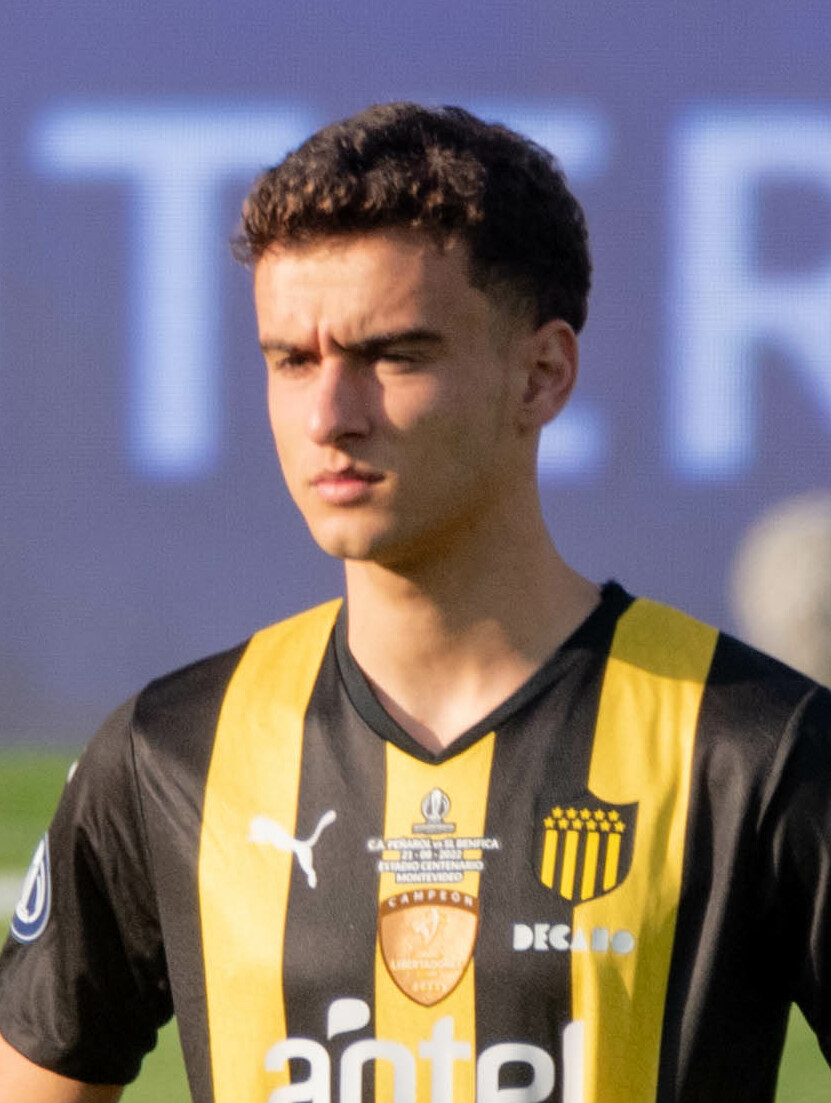
- Rossi with Peñarol in 2022

Personal information
- Full name: Nicolás David Rossi Marachlián
- Date of birth: 21 March 2002 (age 24)
- Place of birth: Montevideo, Uruguay
- Height: 1.78 m (5 ft 10 in)
- Position: Left winger

Team information
- Current team: Dordrecht
- Number: 11

Youth career
- Uruguay Solymar
- C.S. y D. Córcega
- Peñarol

Senior career*
Years	Team	Apps	(Gls)
2021–2025	Peñarol	41	(3)
2023–2024	→ Danubio (loan)	31	(4)
2025	Bellinzona	8	(0)
2025–	Dordrecht	40	(2)
- * Club domestic league appearances and goals as of 14 November 2026

Nicolás David Rossi Marachlián (born 21 March 2002) is a Uruguayan professional footballer who plays as a left winger for Eerste Divisie club Dordrecht.

== Club career ==
Rossi is a youth academy graduate of Peñarol. He made his professional debut for the club on 25 November 2021 in a goalless league draw against Progreso. In August 2022, he extended his contract with the club until December 2025.

In August 2023, Rossi joined Danubio on loan until June 2024. In February 2025, he joined Swiss club Bellinzona on a contract until June 2028.

On 30 July 2025, Rossi joined Dutch club Dordrecht on a two-year contract.

== International career ==
In August 2020, Rossi received a call-up from the Armenia under-19 team to take part in a training camp.

== Personal life ==
Born in Uruguay, Rossi is of Armenian descent through his mother's family and Italian through his father's. His elder brother Diego Rossi is also a professional footballer.

== Career statistics ==
As of match played 28 October 2026

Appearances and goals by club, season and competition
Club	Season	League			National cup (Note: Includes Copa Uruguay, Swiss Cup, KNVB Cup)		Continental		Other		Total	
Club	Season	Division	Apps	Goals	Apps	Goals	Apps	Goals	Apps	Goals	Apps	Goals
Peñarol	2021	UPD	1	0	—		0	0	0	0	1	0
Peñarol	2022	UPD	22	2	4	0	0	0	0	0	26	2
Peñarol	2023	UPD	17	1	0	0	5 (Note: Appearances in Copa Sudamericana)	0	—		22	1
Peñarol	2024	UPD	1	0	0	0	0	0	1 (Note: Appearance in Torneo Intermedio final)	0	2	0
Peñarol	Total		41	3	4	0	5	0	1	0	51	3
Danubio (loan)	2023	UPD	13	0	2	0	—		—		15	0
Danubio (loan)	2024	UPD	18	4	0	0	6	0	—		24	4
Danubio (loan)	Total		31	4	2	0	6	0	0	0	39	4
Bellinzona	2024–25	Swiss Challenge League	8	0	1	0	—		—		9	0
Dordrecht	2025–26	Eerste Divisie	27	0	1	0	—		—		28	0
Dordrecht	2026–27	Eerste Divisie	11	2	1	0	—		—		12	2
Dordrecht	Total		38	2	2	0	0	0	0	0	40	2
Career total			118	9	9	0	11	0	1	0	139	9

== Honours ==
Peñarol

- Uruguayan Primera División: 2021, 2024

Peñarol U20

- U-20 Copa Libertadores: 2022
