= 2024–25 AC Bellinzona season =

AC Bellinzona
2024–25 season
- Manager: Manuel Benavente
- Stadium: Stadio Comunale Bellinzona
- Swiss Challenge League: 5th
- Swiss Cup: Pre-season

The 2024–25 season is the 121st season in the history of AC Bellinzona, and the club's third consecutive season in the Swiss Challenge League. In addition to the domestic league, the team is scheduled to participate in the Swiss Cup.

== Transfers ==
=== In ===
Pos.	Player	Transferred to	Fee	Date	Source
MF	(Liberia) Mohammed Sangare	(Scotland) Livingston	Undisclosed	15 July 2024	
MF	(Italy) Tommaso Centinaro	(Switzerland) Team Ticino U19	Free	16 July 2024	
GK	(Switzerland) Serif Berbic	(Switzerland) Lugano	Loan	17 July 2024	
MF	(Nigeria) Chinwendu Johan Nkama	(Switzerland) Lugano	Loan	17 July 2024	
DF	(Uruguay) Sebastián Gorga	(Uruguay) Rampla Juniors	Undisclosed	18 July 2024	
DF	(Switzerland) Nicola Sutter	(Switzerland) Thun	Undisclosed	3 January 2025	

=== Out ===
Pos.	Player	Transferred to	Fee	Date	Source
DF	(Switzerland) Miguel Rodrigues	(Switzerland) Yverdon-Sport	Loan return	30 June 2024	
MF	(Mauritania) Abdallahi Mahmoud	(Spain) Deportivo Alavés	Loan return	30 June 2024	
MF	(Switzerland) Stephan Seiler	(Switzerland) Schaffhausen		1 July 2024	
FW	(Uruguay) Rodrigo Pollero		Released	1 July 2024	

== Competitions ==
=== Overall record ===
Competition	First match	Last match	Starting round	Record							
Competition	First match	Last match	Starting round	Pld	W	D	L	GF	GA	GD	Win %
Swiss Challenge League	20 July 2024		Matchday 1	3	1	1	1	4	4	+0	33.33
Swiss Cup	16 August 2024			0	0	0	0	0	0	+0	—
Total				3	1	1	1	4	4	+0	33.33

Last updated: 3 August 2024
Source: Soccerway

=== Swiss Challenge League ===
==== League table ====
Pos	Team	Pld	W	D	L	GF	GA	GD	Pts	Promotion, qualification or relegation
5	Wil	36	14	11	11	60	55	+5	53	
6	Vaduz	36	13	12	11	48	49	−1	51	Qualification for Conference League second qualifying round (Note: Vaduz qualified for the Conference League second qualifying round by winning the 2024–25 Liechtenstein Cup.)
7	Bellinzona (Note: Bellinzona were deducted 3 points on 16 December 2024 (confirmed on 22 January 2025), for failing to report social contribution payments. This decision was partially overturned by CAS on 25 April 2025 (Bellinzona are still fined SFr 30,000).)	36	11	11	14	47	60	−13	44	
8	Xamax	36	12	5	19	57	65	−8	41	
9	Nyon	36	10	6	20	44	69	−25	36	

Source: Swiss Challenge League
Rules for classification: 1) Points; 2) Goal difference; 3) Goals scored; 4) Head-to-head goal difference; 5) Head-to-head goals scored 6) Away goals scored; 7) Draw.

==== Results summary ====
Overall								Home						Away					
Pld	W	D	L	GF	GA	GD	Pts	W	D	L	GF	GA	GD	W	D	L	GF	GA	GD
3	1	1	1	4	4	0	4	1	1	0	3	2	+1	0	0	1	1	2	−1

Last updated: 3 August 2024.

==== Results by round ====
Round	1	2	3
Ground	H	A	H
Result	W	L	D
Position	4		

Updated to match(es) played on 3 August 2024. Source:
A = Away; H = Home; W = Win; D = Draw; L = Loss

==== Matches ====
The match schedule was released on 18 June 2024.

20 July 2024 1	Bellinzona	0–3; Awarded	Wil	Bellinzona
18:00	Nivokazi 33', (yellow card) 46'; Sauter (yellow card) 35'; Chacón (yellow card) 54'; L'Ghoul (yellow card) 71'; Nkama 85'; Sörensen (yellow card) 90+5'		Borges 9'; Ndau (yellow card) 57'; Maier (yellow card) 58'	Stadium: Stadio Comunale Bellinzona; Referee: Mirel Turkes
Note: Administrative loss for violation of regulations

26 July 2024 2	Stade Nyonnais	2–1	Bellinzona	Nyon
19:30	Escorza (yellow card) 66'; Koré 72' (pen.); Diomande (yellow card) 81'; Yana 87'; Olaniyi (yellow card) 90+4'		Chukwuemeka 4'; Hervé Lévi Matondo (yellow card) 26'; Gloor (yellow card) 57' (yellow-red card) 70'; Berbić (yellow card) 60'	Stadium: Colovray Sports Centre; Attendance: 450; Referee: Huseyin Sanli

3 August 2024 3	Bellinzona	1–1	Étoile Carouge	Bellinzona
				Stadium: Stadio Comunale Bellinzona

=== Swiss Cup ===
16 August 2024 First round	SC Kriens	v	Bellinzona	Kriens
20:00
