= Gonzalo Petit =

Uruguayan footballer (born 2006)

Personal information
- Full name: Gonzalo Ezequiel Petit Abad
- Date of birth: 21 September 2006 (age 20)
- Place of birth: Carmelo, Uruguay
- Height: 1.89 m (6 ft 2 in)
- Position: Forward

Team information
- Current team: Cádiz (on loan from Betis)

Youth career
- Artigas Carmelo
- Nacional

Senior career*
Years	Team	Apps	(Gls)
2024–2025	Nacional	25	(8)
2025–	Betis	0	(0)
2025–2026	→ Mirandés (loan)	19	(4)
2026	→ Granada (loan)	16	(3)
2026–	→ Cádiz (loan)	0	(0)

International career
2021	Uruguay U15	1	(0)
2022–2023	Uruguay U17	19	(2)
2024–2025	Uruguay U20	19	(7)
- * Club domestic league appearances and goals as of 9 June 2026

Gonzalo Ezequiel Petit Abad (born 21 September 2006) is a Uruguayan professional footballer who plays as a forward for Spanish club Cádiz CF, on loan from Real Betis.

== Early and personal life ==
Petit was born in Carmelo in Colonia Department. His father Eugenio Petit won the Campeonato Uruguayo Federal de Básquetbol with Aguada in 1974 and 1976, while his maternal grandfather Washington Abad played for Nacional in the early 1970s.

== Club career ==
=== Nacional ===
In March 2023, Petit signed his first contract with Nacional. The following January, his contract was extended to last through 2026.

Petit had his first call-up to Nacional's first team on 30 May 2024 for a Copa Libertadores game away to Libertad in Paraguay. He made his debut in the Uruguayan Primera División on 13 July, coming on as a half-time substitute for Gonzalo Carneiro and scoring in added time at the end of a 6–0 win away to Danubio.

On 4 August 2024, Petit came on in the 36th minute against rivals Peñarol in the Torneo Intermedio final and scored the equalising goal in a 1–1 draw. He then asked manager Martín Lasarte for permission to take an early penalty in the shootout, which his team won 8–7.

=== Betis ===
On 18 July 2025, Real Betis announced the signing of Petit on a six-year contract. According to Seville-based newspaper Estadio Deportivo, the fee was an initial US$7 million for 85% of the player's economic rights, with a further US$1.8 million in performance-related bonuses.

==== Loans in Segunda División ====
On 8 August 2025, however, Betis announced Petit's loan to Segunda División side CD Mirandés, for one year. He played 21 games across all competitions, scoring five goals and contributing one assist; in his last game for the bottom-placed team on 2 January 2026, he was sent off for the first time in his career, after 61 minutes of a 2–1 loss at SD Eibar.

Petit's loan to Mirandés was cut short on 16 January, and he moved to fellow league team Granada CF also in a temporary deal. He played 16 games, starting 10, and scored three goals; on 22 March he scored after 46 seconds of a 2–0 win at Real Sociedad B.

On 1 September 2026, Petit moved to Cádiz CF also in division two, on loan for the season.

== International career ==
In March 2023, Petit was named in Uruguay under-17 team squad for the 2023 South American U-17 Championship. He was also named in the 23-man squad for the 2025 South American U-20 Championship in Venezuela, and scored twice in a 6–0 group win over Paraguay as his team reached the final stage.

== Career statistics ==
As of 24 May 2026

Appearances and goals by club, season and competition
Club	Season	League			National cup		Continental		Other		Total	
Club	Season	Division	Apps	Goals	Apps	Goals	Apps	Goals	Apps	Goals	Apps	Goals
Nacional	2024	Uruguayan Primera División	9	2	4	3	0	0	1 (Note: Appearance in Torneo Intermedio final)	1	14	6
Nacional	2025	Uruguayan Primera División	16	6	0	0	3 (Note: Appearances in Copa Libertadores)	0	1	0	20	6
Nacional	Total		25	8	4	3	3	0	2	1	34	12
Betis	2025–26	La Liga	0	0	0	0	0	0	—		0	0
Betis	2026–27	La Liga	0	0	0	0	0	0	—		0	0
Betis	Total		0	0	0	0	0	0	—		0	0
Mirandés (loan)	2025–26	Segunda División	19	4	2	1	—		—		21	5
Granada (loan)	2025–26	Segunda División	16	3	—		—		—		16	3
Career total			60	15	6	4	3	0	2	1	71	20
