= Braulio Guisolfo =

Uruguayan footballer

Personal information
- Full name: Braulio Guisolfo López
- Date of birth: 7 May 2002 (age 24)
- Place of birth: San Jacinto, Uruguay
- Height: 1.80 m (5 ft 11 in)
- Position: Defensive midfielder

Team information
- Current team: Curicó Unido
- Number: 5

Youth career
- Peñarol

Senior career*
Years	Team	Apps	(Gls)
2022–2024	Peñarol	0	(0)
2023–2024	→ Fénix (loan)	37	(0)
2025–	Curicó Unido	7	(0)

International career
2016–2017	Uruguay U15	20	(1)
2019	Uruguay U17	8	(0)
- * Club domestic league appearances and goals as of 28 April 2025

Braulio Guisolfo López (born 7 May 2002) is a Uruguayan professional footballer who plays as a defensive midfielder for Chilean club Curicó Unido.

== Club career ==
Born in San Jacinto, Uruguay, Guisolfo is a product of the Peñarol youth system and represented them in the 2022 U20 Intercontinental Cup. He made his professional debut under Alfredo Arias in the Copa Sudamericana match Millonarios on 23 May 2023. He was loaned out to Fénix in the Uruguayan Primera División from the second half of 2023 to the end of the 2024.

As a free agent, Guisolfo moved abroad and joined Chilean club Curicó Unido in 2025.

== International career ==
Guisolfo represented Uruguay at under-15 level from 2016 to 2017 and at under-17 level in the 2019 South American Championship.
