= João Graça =

Portuguese footballer (born 1995)

Personal information
- Full name: João Pedro Salazar da Graça
- Date of birth: 18 June 1995 (age 31)
- Place of birth: Matosinhos, Portugal
- Height: 1.77 m (5 ft 10 in)
- Position: Midfielder

Youth career
- 2004–2008: Boavista
- 2006–2007: → Pasteleira (loan)
- 2008–2014: Porto
- 2010–2011: → Padroense (loan)

Senior career*
Years	Team	Apps	(Gls)
2013–2017	Porto B	93	(7)
2017–2019	Feirense	9	(0)
2018–2019	→ Arouca (loan)	4	(0)
2019	Oliveirense	9	(2)
2019–2020	Leixões	18	(3)
2020–2021	Mafra	25	(0)
2021–2026	Rio Ave	89	(2)

International career
2011	Portugal U16	3	(0)
2013	Portugal U18	4	(1)
2014	Portugal U19	6	(0)
- * Club domestic league appearances and goals as of 22:27, 22 February 2026 (UTC)

João Pedro Salazar da Graça (born 18 June 1995) is a Portuguese professional footballer who plays as a midfielder.

== Club career ==
Graça was born in Matosinhos, and was developed at neighbouring clubs Boavista F.C. and FC Porto. He made his professional debut in the LigaPro with the latter's B team on 10 November 2013, as a 65th-minute substitute for Leandro Silva in a 1–0 away loss against C.F. União.

On 13 September 2015, Graça scored his first second-division goals, a brace in the 4–2 win at F.C. Famalicão where he also provided an assist for André Silva. He added a further five until the end of the season, as Porto's reserves became the first to win the national championship.

In summer 2017, Graça signed a three-year contract with C.D. Feirense. He played his first match in the Primeira Liga on 24 September, featuring 45 minutes of a 1–4 home defeat to C.F. Os Belenenses.

Graça returned to the second tier subsequently, where he represented in quick succession F.C. Arouca (on loan), U.D. Oliveirense, Leixões SC, C.D. Mafra and Rio Ave FC. In the 2021–22 campaign, in service of the latter, he again won the league while making 24 appearances in all competitions, but this time achieved promotion.

On 28 June 2024, Graça agreed to an extension at Rio Ave until 2026. For the better part of 2025–26, himself and João Tomé were the only national players in a Sotiris Sylaidopoulos-led squad (with the club being owned by Evangelos Marinakis) that included seven of his Greek compatriots; João Novais was transferred shortly after the start of the season.

== Honours ==
Porto B

- Segunda Liga: 2015–16

Rio Ave

- Liga Portugal 2: 2021–22
