= Léo Coelho =

Brazilian footballer (born 1993)

Personal information
- Full name: Leonardo Henriques Coelho
- Date of birth: 17 May 1993 (age 33)
- Place of birth: Rio de Janeiro, Brazil
- Height: 1.90 m (6 ft 3 in)
- Position: Centre-back

Team information
- Current team: Juventus-SP
- Number: 17

Youth career
- 2011-2012: Nacional-SP

Senior career*
Years	Team	Apps	(Gls)
2011–2015	Nacional-SP	56	(2)
2013	→ Grêmio Barueri (loan)	7	(0)
2015	→ Penapolense (loan)	4	(0)
2015	→ Paraná (loan)	10	(0)
2016	Rio Claro	5	(0)
2016–2017	Santos	0	(0)
2017	→ Penapolense (loan)	6	(0)
2018	Portuguesa	5	(0)
2019	Comercial-SP	10	(0)
2019–2021	Fénix	40	(5)
2021–2022	Atlético San Luis	10	(0)
2022	→ Nacional (loan)	33	(2)
2023–2025	Peñarol	71	(3)
2025–2026	Amazonas	35	(2)
2026-	Juventus-SP	0	(0)
- * Club domestic league appearances and goals as of 1 August 2026

Leonardo Henriques Coelho (born 17 May 1993), known as Léo Coelho, is a Brazilian professional footballer who plays as a centre-back for Juventus-SP.

== Club career ==
Born in Rio de Janeiro, Léo Coelho was a Nacional-SP youth graduate. He made his senior debut for the club on 30 April 2011 by starting in a 1–3 home loss against Jabaquara for the Campeonato Paulista Segunda Divisão championship,.

Léo Coelho was subsequently loaned to Grêmio Barueri, Penapolense and Paraná, appearing with the latter in Série B. In January 2016 he moved to Rio Claro permanently.

On 18 May 2016 Léo Coelho was loaned to Santos, being initially assigned to the B-team. After being an undisputed starter during the year's Copa Paulista, he returned to Penapolense on 6 February 2017, also in a temporary deal.

== Career statistics ==
As of 22 September 2026

Club	Season	League			State League		Cup		Continental		Other		Total	
Club	Season	Division	Apps	Goals	Apps	Goals	Apps	Goals	Apps	Goals	Apps	Goals	Apps	Goals
Nacional-SP	2011	Paulista 2ª Divisão	—		8	0	—		—		—		8	0
Nacional-SP	2012	Paulista 2ª Divisão	—		21	1	—		—		—		21	1
Nacional-SP	2013	Paulista 2ª Divisão	—		6	0	—		—		—		6	0
Nacional-SP	2014	Paulista 2ª Divisão	—		19	1	—		—		—		19	1
Nacional-SP	Total		—		56	2	—		—		—		56	2
Grêmio Barueri (loan)	2013	Série C	0	0	7	0	—		—		—		7	0
Penapolense (loan)	2015	Paulista	—		4	0	—		—		—		4	0
Paraná (loan)	2015	Série B	10	0	—		—		—		—		10	0
Rio Claro	2016	Paulista	—		5	0	—		—		—		5	0
Santos	2016	Série A	0	0	—		0	0	—		14 (Note: Appearance(s) in Copa Paulista)	1	14	1
Penapolense (loan)	2017	Paulista A2	—		6	0	—		—		—		6	0
Portuguesa	2018	Paulista A2	—		5	0	—		—		—		5	0
Comercial-SP	2019	Paulista A3	—		10	0	—		—		—		10	0
Fénix	2019	Primera División	18	5	—		—		—		—		18	5
Fénix	2020	Primera División	20	0	—		—		6 (Note: Appearance(s) in Copa Sudamericana)	0	—		26	0
Fénix	2021	Primera División	2	0	—		—		2	0	—		2	0
Fénix	Total		40	5	—		—		8	0	—		46	5
Atlético San Luis	2021-22	Liga MX	10	0	—		—		—		—		10	0
Nacional-URU	2022	Primera División	33	2	—		—		9 (Note: Appearance(s) in Copa Sudamericana and Copa Libertadores)	0	—		42	2
Peñarol	2023	Primera División	31	0	—		3	0	4	0	—		38	2
Peñarol	2024	Primera División	23	3	—		—		5 (Note: Appearance(s) in Copa Libertadores)	0	—		28	3
Peñarol	2025	Primera División	17	0	—		—		6	0	1 (Note: Appearance(s) in Supercopa Uruguaya)	0	24	0
Peñarol	Total		71	3	—		3	0	15	0	1	0	90	5
Amazonas FC	2025	Série B	14	1	—		—		—		—		14	1
Amazonas FC	2026	Série C	11	1	10	0	2	0	—		2 (Note: Appearance(s) in Copa Norte)	0	25	1
Amazonas FC	Total		25	2	10	0	2	0	—		2	0	39	2
Juventus-SP	2026	Paulista A2	—		—		—		—		3	0	3	0
Career total			149	12	103	2	5	0	32	0	20	1	347	17

== Honours ==
Nacional-URU

- Liga AUF Uruguaya: 2022

Peñarol

- Liga AUF Uruguaya: 2024
