= Damián García =

Uruguayan footballer (born 2003)

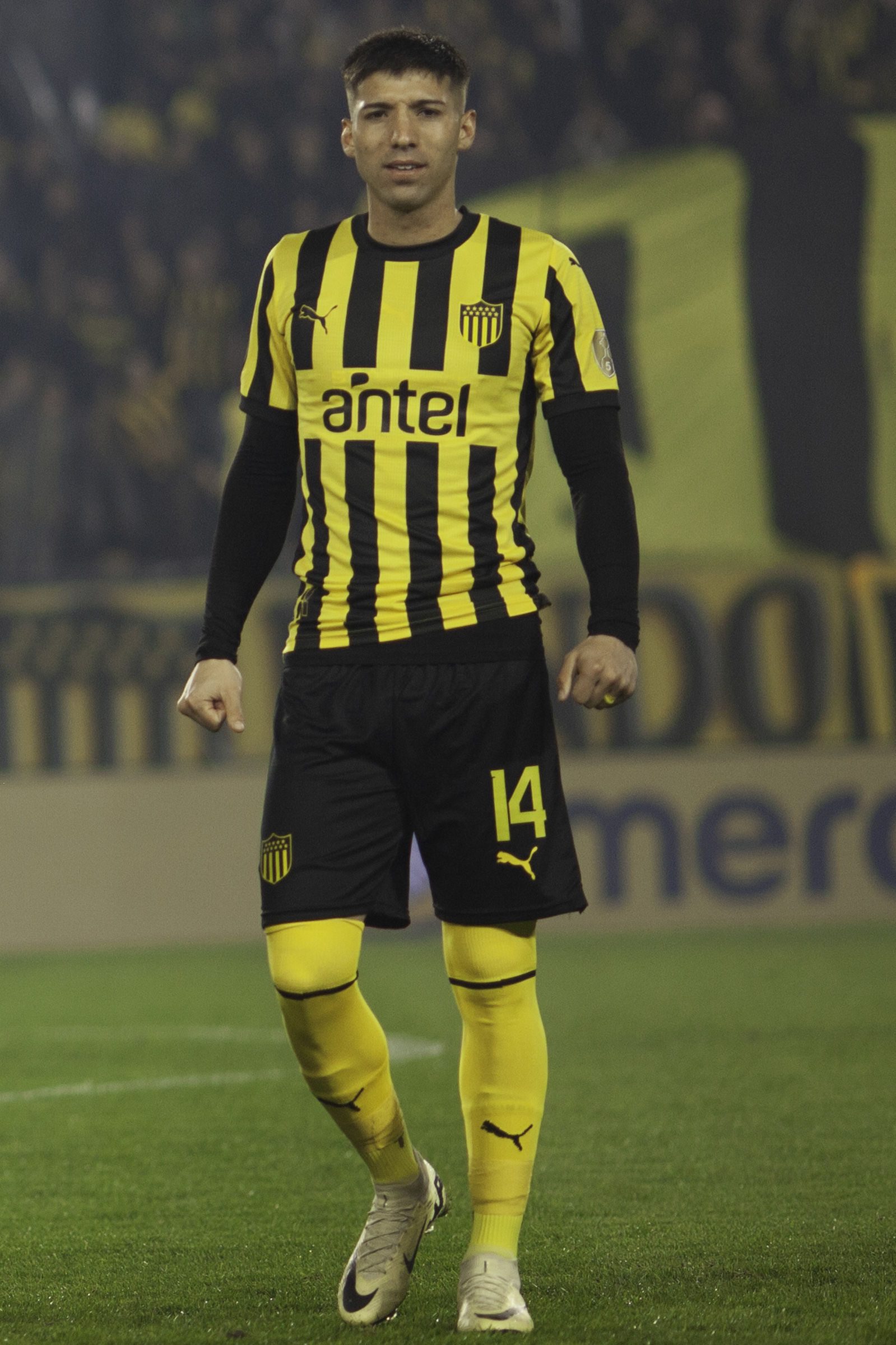
- García with Peñarol in 2024

Personal information
- Full name: Sergio Damián García Graña
- Date of birth: 15 July 2003 (age 23)
- Place of birth: Canelones, Uruguay
- Height: 1.77 m (5 ft 10 in)
- Position: Midfielder

Team information
- Current team: Shabab Al Ahli
- Number: 14

Youth career
- Colonia Nicolich
- Peñarol

Senior career*
Years	Team	Apps	(Gls)
2023–2025	Peñarol	49	(1)
2025–	Shabab Al Ahli	4	(1)

International career
2022–2023	Uruguay U20	29	(1)
Medal record
Men's football
Representing Uruguay
FIFA U-20 World Cup
Winner	2023 Argentina
South American U-20 Championship
Runner-up	2023 Colombia
- * Club domestic league appearances and goals as of 20 May 2025

Sergio Damián García Graña (born 15 July 2003) is a Uruguayan professional footballer who plays as a midfielder for UAE Pro League club Shabab Al Ahli.

== Early life ==
García was born one of eight children, and lost his father at the age of 15. His mother was a domestic worker, and his local neighbours hosted friendlies to raise money to support the family. He began playing football locally in Colonia Nicolich, before joining Peñarol's youth academy.

== Club career ==
García is a youth product of Peñarol, and was part of the side that won the 2022 U-20 Copa Libertadores. On 5 February 2023, he was named to Peñarol's senior side for the first time in a league match. On 10 March 2023, he extended his contract with Peñarol for three more years.

On 8 February 2025, García joined UAE Pro League club Shabab Al Ahli on a five-year contract.

== International career ==
On 3 January 2023, García was called up to the Uruguay U20s for the 2023 South American U-20 Championship. He played eight matches and scored one goal in the tournament, where they came in second and earned qualification into the 2023 FIFA U-20 World Cup. He returned to the Uruguay U20s for the U20 World Cup, and played seven games as they won the tournament over Italy U20.

== Honours ==
Peñarol

- Uruguayan Primera División: 2024

Uruguay U20

- FIFA U-20 World Cup: 2023
- South American U-20 Championship runner-up: 2023

Individual

- Uruguayan Primera División best young player: 2024
- Uruguayan Primera División team of the season: 2024
