= Washington Aguerre =

Uruguayan football player (born 1993)

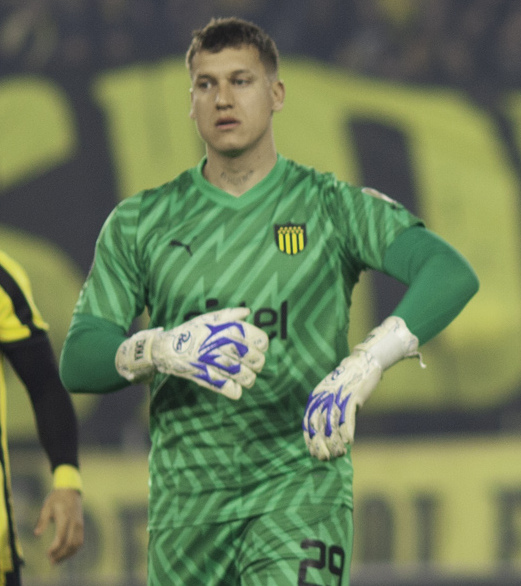
- Aguerre with Peñarol in 2024

Personal information
- Full name: Washington Omar Aguerre Lima
- Date of birth: 23 April 1993 (age 33)
- Place of birth: Artigas, Uruguay
- Height: 1.87 m (6 ft 2 in)
- Position: Goalkeeper

Team information
- Current team: Peñarol
- Number: 29

Youth career
- Peñarol

Senior career*
Years	Team	Apps	(Gls)
2014–2018	Peñarol	2	(0)
2015–2016	→ Miramar Misiones (loan)	0	(0)
2016	→ Cerro Largo (loan)	12	(0)
2017	→ Plaza Colonia (loan)	8	(0)
2018	→ Cerro Largo (loan)	26	(0)
2019	Cerro Largo	34	(1)
2020	Peñarol	0	(0)
2020	→ Cerro Largo (loan)	16	(0)
2021	Cerro Largo	13	(0)
2021–2023	Querétaro	41	(0)
2023	América Mineiro	2	(0)
2024	Peñarol	25	(0)
2025	Independiente Medellín	39	(0)
2026-	Peñarol	2	(0)

International career
2013	Uruguay U20	1	(0)
Medal record
Representing Uruguay
Men's Football
FIFA U-20 World Cup
Runner-up	2013 Turkey
South American U-20 Championship
Third place	2013 Argentina
- * Club domestic league appearances and goals as of 11 December 2025

Washington Omar Aguerre Lima (born 23 April 1993) is a Uruguayan professional footballer who plays as a goalkeeper for Uruguayan Primera División club Peñarol.

== Club career ==
A youth academy product of Peñarol, Aguerre made his professional debut on 31 August 2014 in a 2–0 win against Tacuarembó.

On 10 October 2019, he scored his first career goal in Cerro Largo's 2–0 win against Cerro.

On 5 September 2023, América Mineiro officially announced Aguerre's signing until 31 December 2023.

== International career ==
Aguerre is a former Uruguay youth international. His only match for under-20 team was on 13 June 2013 against El Salvador. He was the team's third-choice goalkeeper behind Guillermo de Amores and Jonathan Cubero during the 2013 FIFA U-20 World Cup and the 2013 South American Youth Football Championship.

== Honours ==
Peñarol

- Uruguayan Primera División: 2024
