= Randall Rodríguez =

Uruguayan footballer (born 2003)

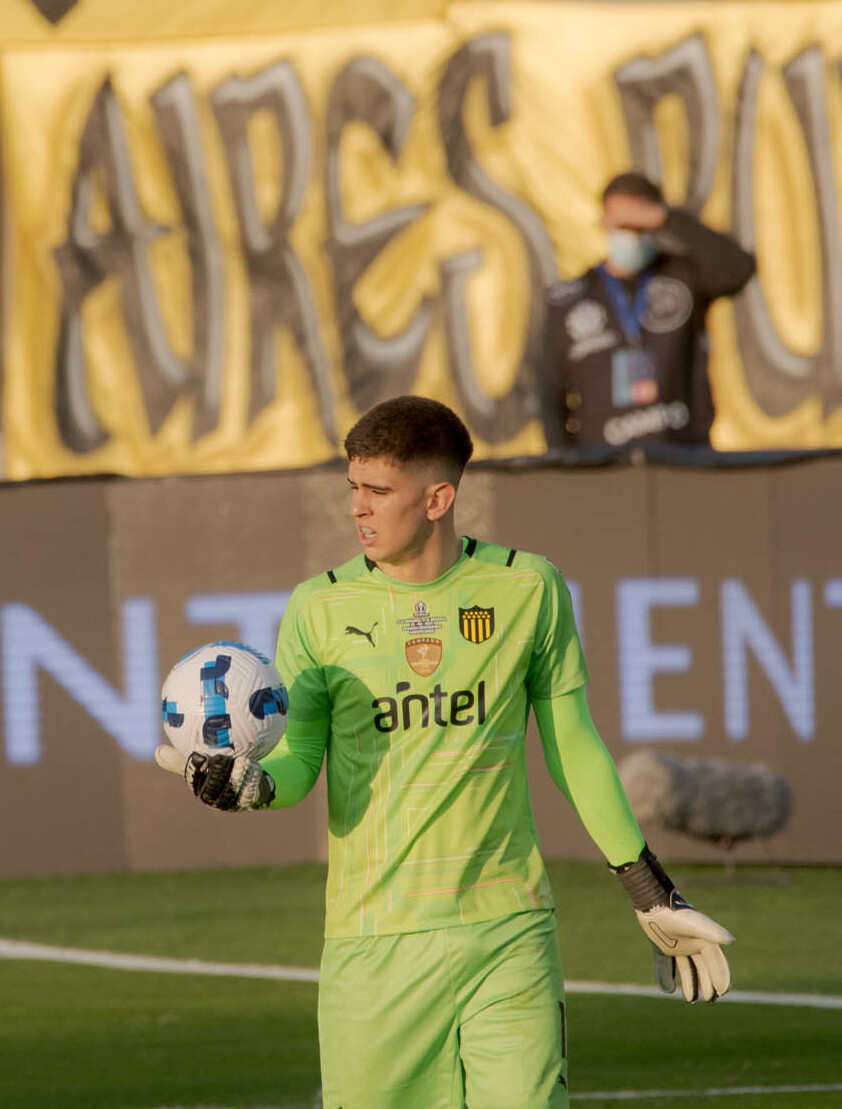
- Rodríguez in 2022

Personal information
- Full name: Randall Jonas Rodríguez Lucas
- Date of birth: 29 November 2003 (age 22)
- Place of birth: Maldonado, Uruguay
- Height: 1.88 m (6 ft 2 in)
- Position: Goalkeeper

Youth career
- Peñarol

Senior career*
Years	Team	Apps	(Gls)
2024	Peñarol	2	(0)
2024–2026	Vélez Sarsfield	3	(0)
2025	→ Boston River (loan)	0	(0)

International career^{‡}
2018–2019	Uruguay U17	4	(0)
2021–2023	Uruguay U20	39	(0)
2024	Uruguay U23	6	(0)
2024	Uruguay local	1	(0)
Medal record
Men's football
Representing Uruguay
FIFA U-20 World Cup
Winner	2023 Argentina
South American U-20 Championship
Runner-up	2023 Colombia
- * Club domestic league appearances and goals as of 25 May 2026 ‡ National team caps and goals as of 31 May 2024

Randall Jonas Rodríguez Lucas (born 29 November 2003) is a Uruguayan professional footballer who plays as a goalkeeper.

== Club career ==
Born in Maldonado, Rodríguez was part of Peñarol under-20 team which won the 2022 U-20 Copa Libertadores. In the final, he saved two penalties against Independiente del Valle to help his side secure the title. He was also in goal when his team suffered a 1–0 loss in the 2022 Under-20 Intercontinental Cup match against Benfica.

In June 2022, Rodríguez renewed his contract with Peñarol until December 2024. On 18 April 2024, he made his official debut for the club in a 3–1 cup defeat to Montevideo City Torque.

On 31 July 2024, Rodríguez moved to Argentina by joining Vélez Sarsfield. On 8 August 2025, he joined Boston River on a loan deal until the end of the season.

== International career ==
Rogriguez played for Uruguay at the 2023 South American U-20 Championship held in Colombia, and began in January 2023. He was then the first choice goalkeeper of the Uruguayan side that won the 2023 FIFA U-20 World Cup.

In June 2023, he received his first call-up to the Uruguayan senior national team by manager Marcelo Bielsa. In January 2024, he was named in Uruguay's squad for the 2024 CONMEBOL Pre-Olympic Tournament. In May 2024, he was named in the first ever squad of the Uruguay local national team. He made his Uruguay local team debut on 31 May 2024 in a goalless draw against Costa Rica.

== Career statistics ==
As of match played 23 May 2024

Appearances and goals by club, season and competition
Club	Season	League			Cup		Continental		Other		Total	
Club	Season	Division	Apps	Goals	Apps	Goals	Apps	Goals	Apps	Goals	Apps	Goals
Peñarol	2023	UPD	0	0	1	0	0	0	0	0	1	0
Peñarol	2024	UPD	1	0	0	0	0	0	—		1	0
Career total			1	0	1	0	0	0	0	0	2	0

== Honours ==
Peñarol

- Uruguayan Primera División: 2024

Peñarol U20

- U-20 Copa Libertadores: 2022

Vélez Sarsfield

- Argentine Primera División: 2024

Uruguay U20

- FIFA U-20 World Cup: 2023
- South American U-20 Championship runner-up: 2023
