= João Tomé =

Portuguese footballer

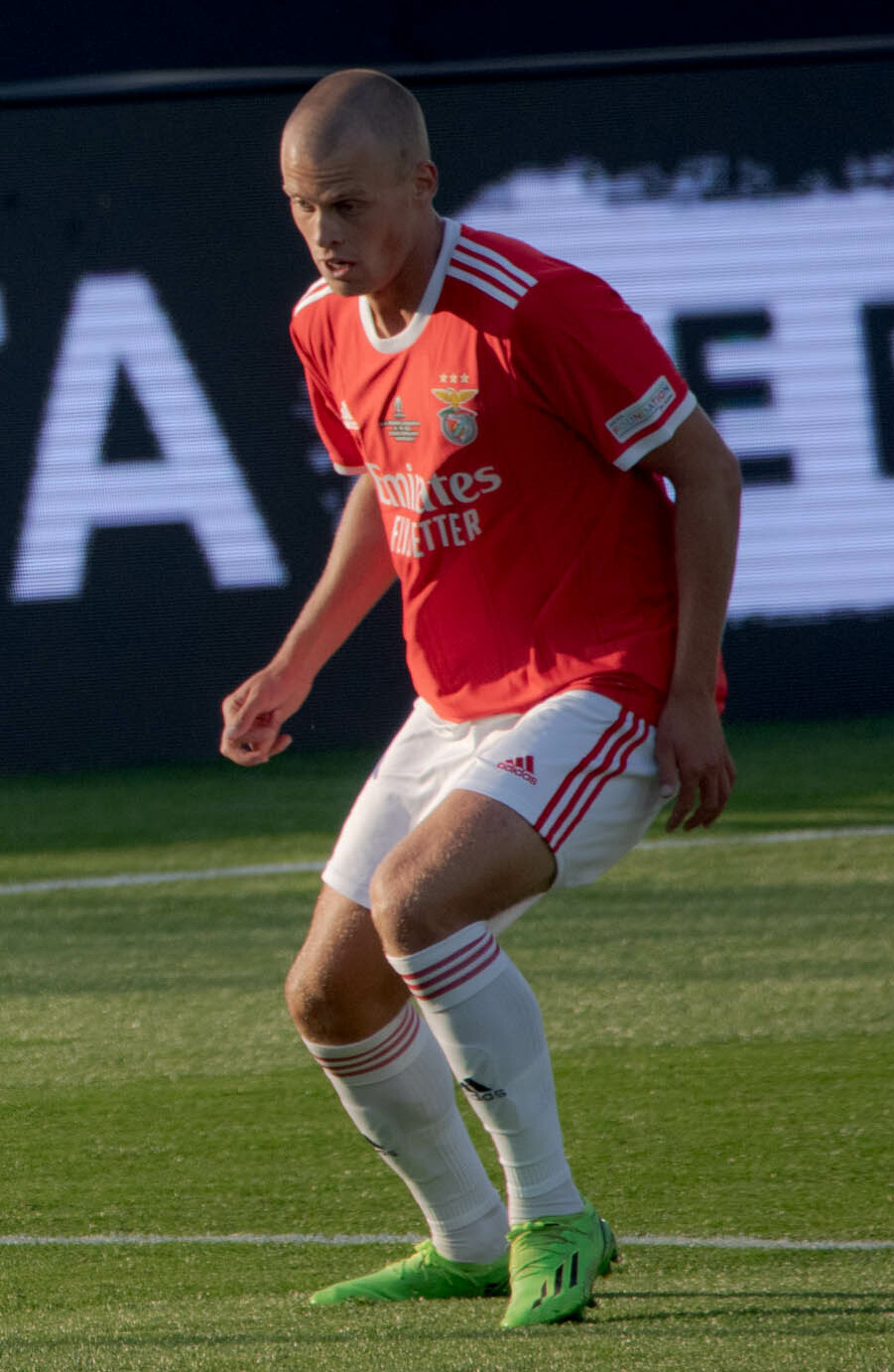
- João Tomé with Benfica at the Under-20 Intercontinental Cup

Personal information
- Full name: João Tomé Esteves Baptista
- Date of birth: 12 February 2003 (age 23)
- Place of birth: Lisbon, Portugal
- Height: 1.85 m (6 ft 1 in)
- Position: Right-back

Team information
- Current team: Rio Ave
- Number: 20

Youth career
- Colégio Guadalupe
- 2011–2022: Benfica

Senior career*
Years	Team	Apps	(Gls)
2022–2024	Benfica B	54	(1)
2024–	Rio Ave	42	(0)

International career
2017–2019	Portugal U16	13	(0)
2018	Portugal U15	5	(2)
2019–2020	Portugal U17	8	(2)
2021	Portugal U18	1	(0)
2021–2022	Portugal U19	5	(0)
2022–2023	Portugal U20	6	(0)
- * Club domestic league appearances and goals as of 22:25, 8 November 2026 (UTC)

João Tomé Esteves Baptista (born 12 February 2003), known as João Tomé, is a Portuguese professional footballer who plays as a right-back for Primeira Liga club Rio Ave.

== Club career ==
=== Benfica ===
Born in Lisbon, João Tomé joined S.L. Benfica's academy aged 8. In August 2021, he signed a professional contract with the club.

João Tomé made his senior debut with the reserve team in the Liga Portugal 2 on 6 August 2022, playing 90 minutes in a 1–1 home draw against Académico de Viseu FC. He scored his first goal in the competition on 18 October that year, in the 5–1 win over C.D. Mafra also at the Benfica Campus.

On 11 April 2023, João Tomé was called to the main squad by manager Roger Schmidt for a game against Inter Milan in the quarter-finals of the UEFA Champions League. He was not used in the 2–0 home defeat.

=== Rio Ave ===
On 30 June 2024, João Tomé joined Rio Ave F.C. on a three-year deal. His first match in the Primeira Liga took place on 9 August, when he featured the second half of a 3–1 loss away to Sporting CP.

For the better part of 2025–26, João Tomé and João Graça were the only national players in a Sotiris Sylaidopoulos-led side (with the club being owned by Evangelos Marinakis) that included seven of his Greek compatriots; João Novais left the squad shortly after the season started.

== International career ==
João Tomé earned caps for Portugal from under-15 to under-20 level.

== Career statistics ==
As of 24 April 2023

Club	Season	League			National Cup		League Cup		Other		Total	
Club	Season	Division	Apps	Goals	Apps	Goals	Apps	Goals	Apps	Goals	Apps	Goals
Benfica B	2022–23	Liga Portugal 2	26	1	–		–		0	0	26	1
Career total			26	1	0	0	0	0	0	0	26	1

== Honours ==
Benfica

- UEFA Youth League: 2021–22
- Under-20 Intercontinental Cup: 2022
