= Joaquín Papa =

Uruguayan football coach

Personal information
- Full name: Joaquín Papa Monestier
- Date of birth: 23 October 1986 (age 40)
- Place of birth: Montevideo, Uruguay

Team information
- Current team: Independiente del Valle (manager)

Youth career
- El Tanque Sisley
- Liverpool Montevideo

Senior career*
| Years | Team | Apps | (Gls) |
- La Luz

Managerial career
- 2013: Albion (youth)
- 2014–2016: Racing Montevideo (youth)
- 2017: Montevideo Wanderers (youth)
- 2019–2022: Nacional Montevideo (youth)
- 2023: Rentistas
- 2024–2025: Liverpool Montevideo
- 2026–: Independiente del Valle
- * Club domestic league appearances and goals

Joaquín Papa Monestier (born 24 October 1986) is a Uruguayan football coach, currently the manager of Ecuadorian club Independiente del Valle.

== Career ==
=== Early career ===
After representing El Tanque Sisley and Liverpool Montevideo as a youth, Papa played for La Luz as a senior, before later moving to amateur leagues with Intrusos FC and Malvín 59. After retiring, he began his career in 2013, as an under-16 manager of Albion.

In 2018, after working as an under-17 manager of Racing Montevideo and Montevideo Wanderers, Papa moved to Nacional Montevideo as an analyst of the youth sides. He became the manager of the latter's under-14 team in May 2019, and remained at the club until December 2022.

On 16 January 2023, Papa was named manager of Segunda División side Rentistas. He was sacked in July, and moved to Spain in December to join the staff of compatriot Paulo Pezzolano, as a technical assistant.

=== Liverpool Montevideo ===
On 17 October 2024, Papa left Valladolid to return to Liverpool, now being appointed manager of the club. He won the 2025 Apertura Tournament with the club, but left on 12 December of that year, as his contract was due to expire.

=== Independiente del Valle ===
On 17 December 2025, Papa was confirmed as manager of Ecuadorian Serie A side Independiente del Valle for the 2026 season.

== Honours ==
Liverpool Montevideo

- Liga AUF Uruguaya: 2025 Apertura
