= Schneider (beer) =

Beer produced in Argentina

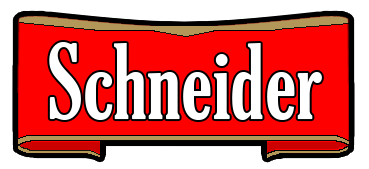

Schneider is the brand of beer produced by the Compañía de Cervecerías Unidas Argentina (CCUA), or Company of United Beer Producers, in Spanish. The CCUA is as of 2006, the 3rd largest producer of beer in Argentina. It controls around 16% of the beer market in the country, and is the official importer of foreign brands Heineken and Budweiser in Argentina. It also imports and commercializes Corona and Guinness.

== Location ==
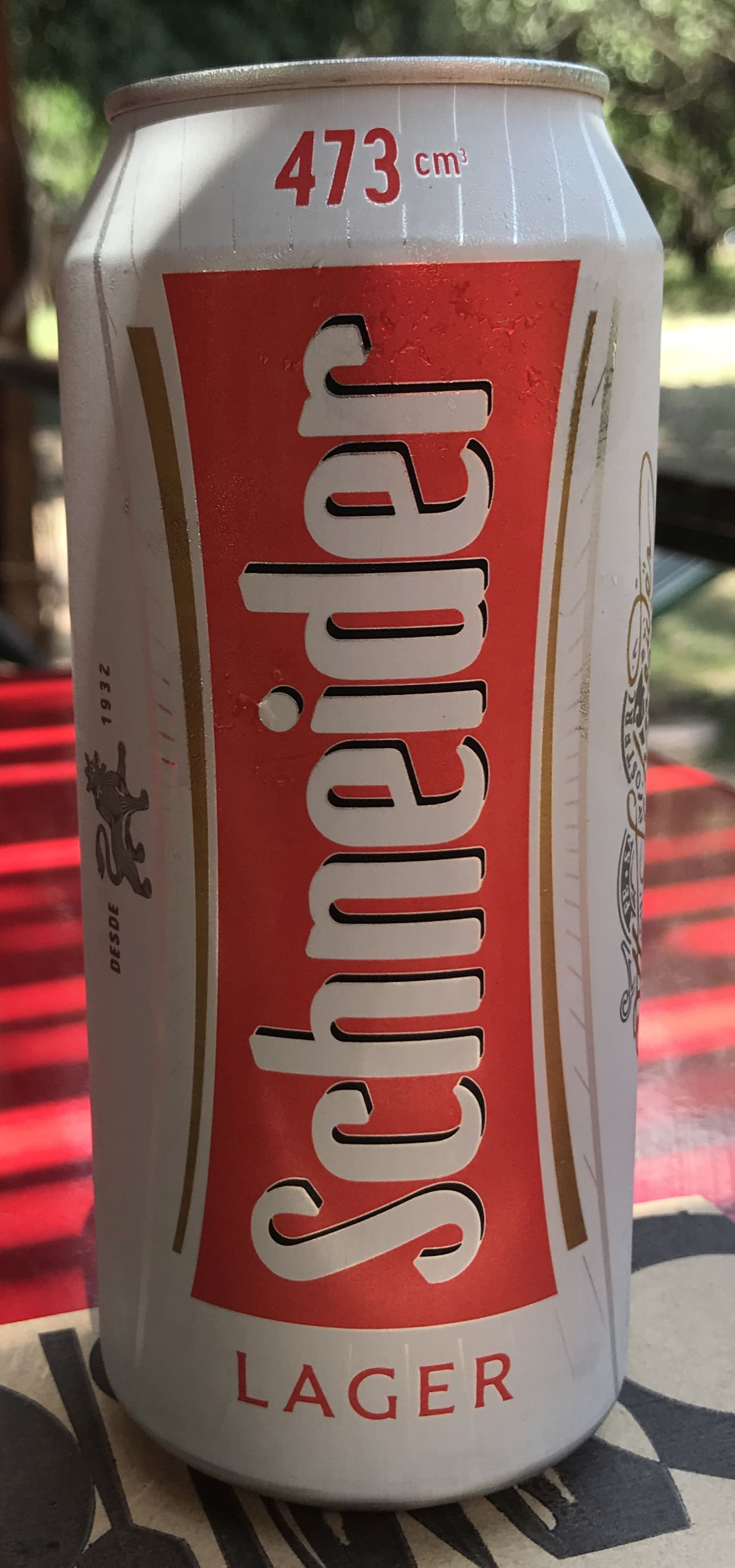

In 1995, the original CCU (based in Uruguay) initiated operations in Argentina. The CCUA is now owned principally by the CCU and Anheuser-Busch (Budweiser). Since then, the company has built two factories in the provinces of Salta and Santa Fe, and sells all around the country through distribution points in Buenos Aires, Córdoba and Rosario, the three major cities of Argentina.

== Products ==
There are three types of beer produced under the franchise of Schneider:

- Rubia - (Spanish for blond) The name is given to the beer due to its bright-gold and clear color. This is the traditional and most popular Schneider beer. It contains 4.7% alcohol and is a mixture of the lager and the German pilsener kinds of beer. It comes in bottles of 1,000, 930, and 660 cm^{3} and cans of 473 and 355 cm^{3}, as well as in barrels of 30 and 50 litres.
- Fuerte - (Spanish for strong) Having a 6.0% of alcohol, it is among the strongest beers in the country. It is a lager beer of oktoberfest/märzen style. It has a bitter taste and a slightly reddish color. It comes in bottles of 930 and 1,000 cm^{3}, and cans of 355 cm^{3}.
- Negra - (Spanish for black) Is produced completely of toasted malt and claims to be the only true black beer of the country. It has an extremely dark color and sweet taste. It comes in bottles of 930 cm^{3}.

== Ten Pack ==
Schneider has recently released a Ten Pack box for their cans. This pack has a peculiar design forming a rectangular box with two rows of 5 cans. On one of the sides, the top corner is colored red and has a cut-it-out mechanism which creates a hole fitting a 355 can for its extraction, leaving the pack still together.
