= Martín Piñeyro =

Argentine football manager (born 1989)

Personal information
- Date of birth: 10 October 1989 (age 37)
- Place of birth: Argentina

Team information
- Current team: Rentistas (manager)

Managerial career
- Years: Team
- Villa Dálmine (youth)
- 2016–2017: Villa Dálmine (assistant)
- 2017: Nueva Chicago (assistant)
- 2018: Villa Dálmine (interim)
- 2020: Villa Dálmine (interim)
- 2021: Villa Dálmine (interim)
- 2022: Central Córdoba (assistant)
- 2023: Estudiantes (assistant)
- 2024–2025: Deportivo Maldonado
- 2026–: Rentistas

Martín Piñeyro (born 10 October 1989) is an Argentine football manager, currently in charge of Uruguayan club Rentistas.

== Career ==
Piñeyro began his career with Villa Dálmine as a youth manager, later becoming an assistant of Walter Marchesi at the club in 2016. He subsequently worked under the same role with Facundo Argüello, following him to Nueva Chicago before returning to Villa in August 2018, as a youth coordinator.

In October 2018, Piñeyro was named interim manager of Villa Dálmine after the departure of Felipe de la Riva, leading the club in one match before the arrival of Walter Otta. He subsequently served another two spells as interim: in 2020, after Lucas Bovaglio left, and in 2021 after de la Riva was sacked.

In July 2022, Piñeyro joined Abel Balbo's staff at Central Córdoba, as his assistant. He followed Balbo to Estudiantes under the same role, before becoming a technical secretary at Tigre in December 2023.

Piñeyro resigned from his role at Tigre in July 2024, and moved to Uruguay on 2 October, after being appointed manager of Deportivo Maldonado.
