= Juan Jacinto Rodríguez =

Uruguayan football manager

Personal information
- Full name: Juan Jacinto Rodríguez Araujo
- Date of birth: 27 November 1958 (age 67)
- Place of birth: Melo, Uruguay
- Position: Left back

Team information
- Current team: Cerro Largo (youth coordinator)

Senior career*
Years	Team	Apps	(Gls)
1976	Naranjo de Melo		
1977–1978	Nacional		
1979–1986	Cerro		
1987–1988	Nacional		
1988–1989	Avaí		
1990	Cerro		
1991	Huracán Buceo		
1992	Progreso		
1993	Sud América		

Managerial career
- 2000–2001: Uruguay U17
- 2005–2006: Nacional (youth)
- 2006–2007: Cerro Largo
- 2008: Nacional (youth)
- 2009: LDU Quito (assistant)
- 2010: Internacional (assistant)
- 2010: Al-Shabab (assistant)
- 2011–2012: Al-Sadd (assistant)
- 2012–2013: Cerro Porteño (assistant)
- 2013: Cerro Largo
- 2015: Al-Wehda
- 2016–2017: Al-Tai
- 2017–2018: Al-Nahda
- 2020–2021: Cerro
- 2023: Cerro Largo (caretaker)
- 2024: Cerro Largo (caretaker)
- * Club domestic league appearances and goals

Juan Jacinto Rodríguez Araujo (born 27 November 1958) is a Uruguayan football manager and former player who played as a left back. He is the current youth coordinator of Cerro Largo.
