= Fabian Gloor =

Cuban footballer

Personal information
- Full name: Fabian Gloor Ronda
- Date of birth: 12 August 2002 (age 24)
- Place of birth: Puerto Padre, Cuba
- Height: 1.82 m (6 ft 0 in)
- Position: Right-back

Team information
- Current team: FC Schaffhausen
- Number: 14

Youth career
- 2007–2016: FC Adliswil
- 2016–2018: FC Zürich
- 2018–2019: Red Star Zürich
- 2019–2023: FC Zürich

Senior career*
Years	Team	Apps	(Gls)
2022–2023	FC Zürich II	27	(1)
2023–2025	FC Zürich	0	(0)
2023–2024	→ Baden (loan)	30	(0)
2024–2025	→ Bellinzona (loan)	15	(0)
2025–	FC Schaffhausen	30	(3)

International career^{‡}
2023–	Cuba	1	(0)
- * Club domestic league appearances and goals as of 30 September 2026 ‡ National team caps and goals as of 06:35, 18 November 2023 (UTC)

Fabian Gloor Ronda (born 12 August 2002) is a Cuban professional footballer who plays as a defensive midfielder for the Swiss club FC Schaffhausen, and the Cuba national team.

== Club career ==
Gloor is a youth product of the Swiss clubs FC Adliswil, FC Zürich and Red Star Zürich. On 5 July 2023, Gloor signed a professional contract with FC Zürich for 2 seasons. On 19 July 2023, he moved to Baden on loan for the 2023–24 season in the Swiss Challenge League. He made his senior and professional debut with Baden in a 6–0 Swiss Challenge League loss to Thun on 4 August 2023. On 3 July 2024, Gloor was loaned to Bellinzona, also in the Swiss Challenge League.

== International career ==
Gloor was born in Puerto Padre, Cuba to a Swiss father and Cuban mother, holding both nationalities. In November 2023, he was called up to the Cuba national team for a friendly against Russia.
