= Šerif Berbić =

Swiss footballer

Personal information
- Date of birth: 25 November 2001 (age 24)
- Place of birth: Uznach, Switzerland
- Height: 1.94 m (6 ft 4 in)
- Position: Goalkeeper

Youth career
- Luzern

Senior career*
Years	Team	Apps	(Gls)
2019–2020	Luzern U21	7	(0)
2020–2022	Rapperswil-Jona	0	(0)
2020–2022	→ Grasshoppers U21 (loan)	8	(0)
2020	→ Grasshoppers (loan)	0	(0)
2022–2026	Lugano	4	(0)
2022–2025	Lugano II	34	(0)
2024–2025	→ Bellinzona (loan)	3	(0)
- * Club domestic league appearances and goals as of 17 May 2026

Šerif Berbić (born 25 November 2001) is a Swiss professional footballer who plays as a goalkeeper.

== Club career ==
A youth product of Luzern, Berbić began his career with their reserves in 2019. On 22 June 2020, he moved to Rapperswil-Jona on a three-year contract. He shortly after went on a two-year loan with Grasshoppers where he primarily played for their reserves.

On 18 August 2022, Berbić transferred to Lugano on a four-year contract. He made his professional debut with Lugano in a 2–0 Swiss Super League win over Young Boys on 25 May 2023.

== International career ==
Born in Switzerland, Berbić is of Bosnian descent. He has been called up to the Switzerland U20s.
