= Máximo Alonso =

Uruguayan football player (born 2002)

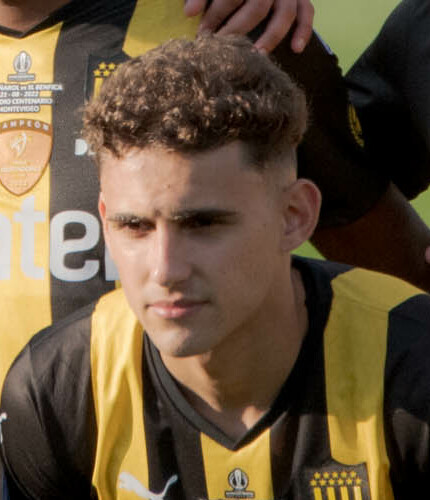
- Alonso with Peñarol in 2022

Personal information
- Full name: Máximo David Alonso Fontes
- Date of birth: 5 July 2002 (age 24)
- Place of birth: Maldonado, Uruguay
- Height: 1.76 m (5 ft 9 in)
- Position: Forward

Team information
- Current team: Central Español
- Number: 30

Youth career
- Peñarol

Senior career*
Years	Team	Apps	(Gls)
2021–2025	Peñarol	28	(1)
2023	→ Deportivo Maldonado (loan)	13	(0)
2024	→ Recreativo Granada (loan)	1	(0)
2024	→ Albion (loan)	10	(0)
2025	Cerro	19	(3)
2025	San Antonio Bulo Bulo	7	(0)
2026–	Central Español	19	(3)

International career
2017	Uruguay U15	25	(6)
- * Club domestic league appearances and goals as of 27 September 2026

Máximo David Alonso Fontes (born 5 July 2002) is a Uruguayan professional footballer who plays as a forward for Liga AUF Uruguaya club Central Español.

== Club career ==
A youth academy graduate of Peñarol, Alonso made his professional debut on 28 January 2021 in his club's 2–1 league defeat against Defensor Sporting. On 9 February 2024, he joined Spanish team Recreativo Granada on loan until the end of the season.

On 5 February 2025, Cerro announced the signing of Alonso. He joined Bolivian club San Antonio Bulo Bulo in July 2025.

== International career ==
Alonso is a current Uruguayan youth international. He was part of Uruguay's squad at 2017 South American U-15 Championship.

== Career statistics ==
As of 13 August 2025

Appearances and goals by club, season and competition
Club	Season	League			Cup (Note: Includes Copa Uruguay, Copa Bolivia)		Continental		Other		Total	
Club	Season	Division	Apps	Goals	Apps	Goals	Apps	Goals	Apps	Goals	Apps	Goals
Peñarol	2020	UPD	4	0	—		0	0	—		4	0
Peñarol	2021	UPD	8	0	—		3 (Note: Appearances in Copa Sudamericana)	0	0	0	11	0
Peñarol	2022	UPD	12	0	0	0	4 (Note: Appearances in Copa Libertadores)	0	1 (Note: Appearance in Supercopa Uruguaya)	0	17	0
Peñarol	2023	UPD	4	1	0	0	4	0	—		8	1
Peñarol	Total		28	1	0	0	11	0	1	0	40	1
Deportivo Maldonado (loan)	2023	UPD	13	0	1	0	—		—		14	0
Recreativo Granada (loan)	2023–24	Primera Federación	1	0	—		—		—		1	0
Albion (loan)	2024	USD	10	0	1	0	—		—		11	0
Cerro	2025	UPD	19	3	—		—		—		19	3
San Antonio Bulo Bulo	2025	Bolivian Primera División	1	0	3	0	2	0	—		6	0
Career total			72	4	5	0	13	0	1	0	91	4

== Honours ==
Peñarol

- Uruguayan Primera División: 2021
- Supercopa Uruguaya: 2022

Peñarol U20

- U-20 Copa Libertadores: 2022
