= Milciades Adorno =

Paraguayan footballer (born 2005)

Personal information
- Full name: Milciades Bautista Adorno Aguero
- Date of birth: 27 January 2005 (age 21)
- Height: 1.75 m (5 ft 9 in)
- Position: Forward

Team information
- Current team: Celaya (on loan from Guaraní)
- Number: 99

Youth career
- Guaraní

Senior career*
Years	Team	Apps	(Gls)
2022–	Guaraní	10	(1)
2023–2024	→ Sportivo Ameliano (loan)	17	(2)
2025	→ Pastoreo (loan)	9	(1)
2026–	→ Celaya (loan)	3	(1)
- * Club domestic league appearances and goals as of 23 April 2026

Milciades Bautista Adorno Aguero (born 27 January 2005) is a Paraguayan footballer who plays as a forward for Celaya on loan from Guaraní.

== Club career ==
Adorno scored his first senior goal in a 2–1 win over Resistencia in May 2022.

In September 2022, he was named by English newspaper The Guardian as one of the best players born in 2005 worldwide.

== Personal life ==
His father, Líder Adorno, was also a footballer, and played in Paraguay.

== Career statistics ==
=== Club ===
As of 15 August 2022.

Club	Season	League			Cup		Continental		Other		Total	
Club	Season	Division	Apps	Goals	Apps	Goals	Apps	Goals	Apps	Goals	Apps	Goals
Club Guaraní	2022	Paraguayan Primera División	9	1	0	0	0	0	0	0	9	1
Club Guaraní	2023	Paraguayan Primera División	0	0	0	0	0	0	0	0	0	0
Club Guaraní	Total		9	1	0	0	0	0	0	0	9	1
Sportivo Ameliano (loan)	2023	Paraguayan Primera División	0	0	0	0	–		0	0	0	0
Career total			9	1	0	0	0	0	0	0	9	1
