= Santiago Homenchenko =

Uruguayan footballer (born 2003)

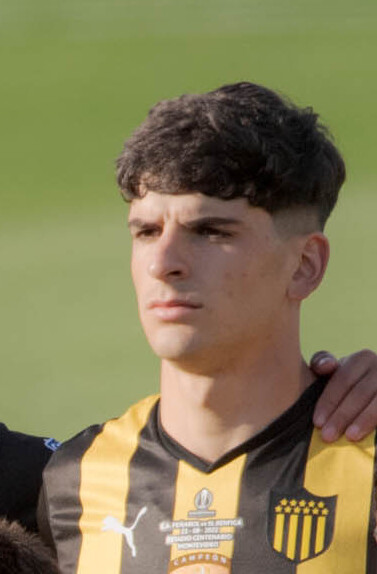
- Homenchenko in 2022

Personal information
- Full name: Santiago Damián Homenchenko Bianchi
- Date of birth: 30 August 2003 (age 23)
- Place of birth: Mercedes, Uruguay
- Height: 1.85 m (6 ft 1 in)
- Positions: Midfielder; centre-back

Team information
- Current team: Querétaro
- Number: 6

Youth career
- Con Los Mismos Colores
- 2013–2016: Peñarol
- 2016–2017: Danubio
- 2018–2020: Con Los Mismos Colores
- 2020–2021: Plaza Colonia
- 2021–2022: Peñarol

Senior career*
Years	Team	Apps	(Gls)
2022–2025	Peñarol	25	(0)
2024	→ Oviedo (loan)	5	(0)
2024–2025	→ Mirandés (loan)	18	(0)
2025–2026	Pachuca	13	(1)
2025–2026	→ Querétaro (loan)	28	(6)
2026–	Querétaro	10	(5)

International career
2022–2023	Uruguay U20	13	(0)
2024	Uruguay U23	6	(2)
Medal record
Men's football
Representing Uruguay
FIFA U-20 World Cup
Winner	2023 Argentina
- * Club domestic league appearances and goals as of 11 October 2026

Santiago Damián Homenchenko Bianchi (born 30 August 2003) is a Uruguayan professional footballer who plays as a midfielder or centre-back for Liga MX club Querétaro.

== Early life ==
Homenchenko was born on 30 August 2003 in Mercedes, the capital of Soriano Department. Homenchenko grew up in a working-class family of paternal Ukrainian and maternal Italian descent. The youngest of ten siblings, Homenchenko promised his mother, who was diagnosed with cancer when he was six-years-old, that he would become a professional footballer. In an interview describing his upbringing, Homenchenko said, "We spent nights without eating, relying on milk with rice or sweet cornstarch, but those things give you personality. [...] When I left Danubio at 15, I had to work, because my mother had no money. We were poor, but we weren't sad. I worked to buy my clothes, but we just had what we needed. That confronts you with reality."

== Club career ==
Homenchenko began his football career with his neighborhood club Con los Mismos Colores. At the age of 10, he was recruited by Néstor Gonçalves and signed for Peñarol where he finished his childhood training. Homenchenko joined Danubio three years later, moving to Montevideo and beginning his youth training. He was released two years in the process after suffering an accident in which he broke a piece of his heel. During his recovery, he returned to his boyhood club of Con los Mismos Colores under their youth system. After a series of good performances, including winning an under-18 team national championship, he signed with Plaza Colonia for the 2020-21 season.

In July 2021, Homenchenko returned to Peñarol. On 8 September 2022, he signed his first professional contract with the club. He made his professional debut on 19 September 2022 as a 84th minute substitute for Brian Lozano in a 3–1 league win over Cerrito. Homenchenko has also represented the under-19 system, in which he was part of the squad that won the 2022 U-20 Copa Libertadores.

On 15 January 2024, a transfer agreement between Peñarol and Real Oviedo was made for Homenchenko to join the Spanish club, whereas Ecuadorian winger Romario Ibarra, who was playing for Oveido on loan from Pachuca, will join Peñarol. Homenchenko's contract with Peñarol was ending in the middle of the year, therefore the club decided to sell 70% of his contract.

On 13 August 2024, Homenchenko moved to fellow Spanish second division side CD Mirandés on a one-year loan deal from Peñarol. The following 15 January, his loan was cut short.

After departing Mirandés, Homenchenko joined Mexican side Pachuca. On 2 August 2025, he joined fellow rival Querétaro on loan for the next season. He scored his first goal with the club on 23 August, in the 98^{th} minute of a 3–2 victory against Atlético San Luis.

== International career ==
Homenchenko has represented Uruguay at various youth levels. In October 2022, he was named in Uruguay's squad for the 2022 South American Games. He played all five matches in the tournament as Uruguay eventually finished fourth after reaching semi-finals. He was also part of the Uruguayan side that won the 2023 FIFA U-20 World Cup.

In January 2024, Homenchenko was named in Uruguay's squad for the 2024 CONMEBOL Pre-Olympic Tournament. In November 2025, he received his first call-up to the Uruguay national team.

== Career statistics ==
As of 9 March 2026

Appearances and goals by club, season and competition
Club	Season	League			Cup		Continental (Note: Includes Copa Sudamericana)		Other (Note: Includes FIFA Club World Cup)		Total	
Club	Season	Division	Apps	Goals	Apps	Goals	Apps	Goals	Apps	Goals	Apps	Goals
Peñarol	2022	Uruguayan Primera División	1	0	0	0	0	0	—		1	0
Peñarol	2023	Uruguayan Primera División	24	0	0	0	4	0	—		28	0
Peñarol	Total		25	0	0	0	4	0	0	0	29	0
Real Oviedo	2023–24	Spanish Segunda División	5	0	0	0	—		—		5	0
Mirandés	2024–25	Spanish Segunda División	18	0	1	1	—		—		19	1
Pachuca	2024–25	Liga MX	13	1	—		—		1	0	14	1
Querétaro	2025–26	Liga MX	21	5	—		—		—		21	5
Career total			82	6	1	1	4	0	1	0	88	7

== Honours ==
Peñarol U20

- U-20 Copa Libertadores: 2022

Uruguay U20

- FIFA U-20 World Cup: 2023
