= Uruguayan Clásico =

Association football rivalry in Uruguay

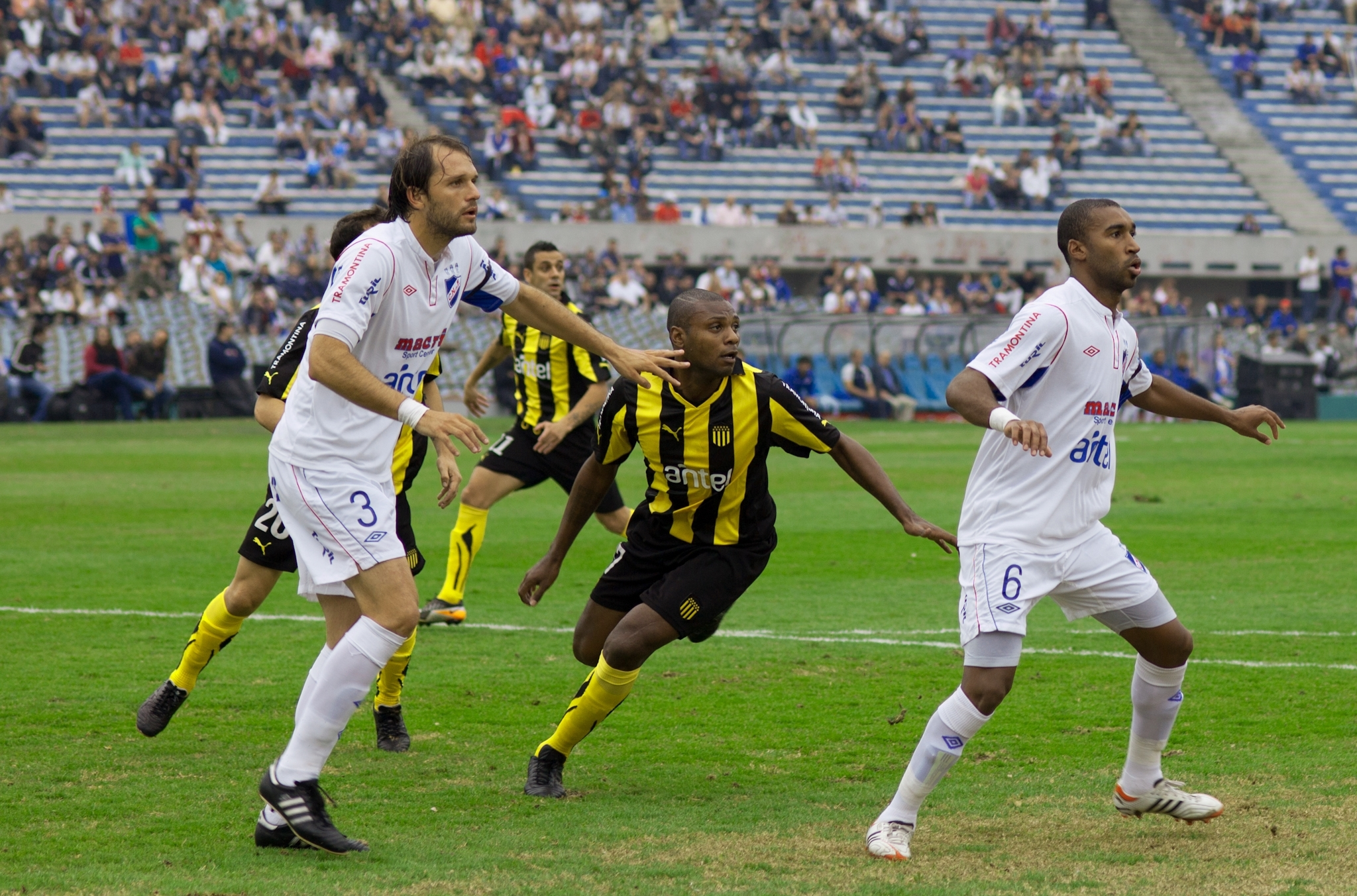
- A scene from the 2012 Uruguayan Clásico

- Nacional Peñarol
- Other names: "Clásico Uruguayo" "El Clásico" "El Superclásico"
- Sport: Association football
- Location: Montevideo
- First meeting: 15 July 1900 (Note: Includes matches by club predecessor CURCC.); Nacional 0–2 CURCC
- Latest meeting: 1 March 2026; Nacional 0-1 Peñarol
- Next meeting: TBD
- Stadiums: Estadio Gran Parque Central; Estadio Campeón del Siglo; Estadio Centenario

Statistics
- Total meetings: 575
- Most wins: Peñarol (201)
- Most player appearances: José Piendibene (62)
- Top scorer: Atilio García (35)
- Largest victory: Nacional 6–0 Peñarol (14 Dec 1941)

The Uruguayan Clásico (Spanish: Clásico del fútbol uruguayo) is the most important rivalry in Uruguayan football and one of the best on the American continent. It is contested between the two most popular football clubs in Uruguay, Club Nacional de Football and Club Atlético Peñarol (formerly known as CURCC), both based in Montevideo. As of 2018, the two teams have won 96 of the 115 Uruguayan Primera División titles, and many international tournaments, including a combined eight Copa Libertadores. The first meeting between the two teams was at the turn of the century in 1900, making it one of the oldest football rivalries outside Great Britain. CURCC won the first match 2–0.

Founded as the Central Uruguay Railway Cricket Club (CURCC) in 1891, it was originally made up of English immigrants representing the Central Uruguay Railway (Ferrocarril Central del Uruguay), and was based in the Peñarol district on the outskirts of the city. Nacional was formed in 1899 as a club for purely native players at a time when football clubs were almost exclusively the domain of European immigrants. CURCC won the first match 2–0.

== Match history ==
Note: Only official matches are included.

=== Nacional v CURCC ===
| Competition | M | CW | D | NW | CG | NG |
|---|---|---|---|---|---|---|
| Primera División (Note: Does not include matches played on June 6, 1901 (1–1), May 14, 1905 (1–1) and July 9, 1905 (0–0), whose results were annulled.) | 25 | 9 | 7 | 9 | 29 | 30 |
| Copa Competencia | 8 | 5 | 1 | 2 | 12 | 9 |
| Copa de Honor | 6 | 3 | 2 | 1 | 13 | 7 |
| Total | 39 | 17 | 10 | 12 | 54 | 46 |

=== Nacional v Peñarol ===
| Competition | M | PW | D | NW | PG | NG |
|---|---|---|---|---|---|---|
| Primera División (AUF) | 245 | 83 | 87 | 75 | 306 | 283 |
| Primera División (CP) (Note: Although not recognised by the AUF, the Consejo Provisorio championship was official.) | 2 | 2 | 0 | 0 | 1 | 0 |
| Supercopa Uruguaya | 2 | 1 | 1 | 0 | 4 | 2 |
| Liguilla Pre-Libertadores (Note: Tournament that served as qualification for Copa Libertadores, held from 1974 to 2009.) | 22 | 12 | 4 | 6 | 34 | 21 |
| Torneo Competencia | 33 | 16 | 6 | 11 | 44 | 34 |
| Torneo de Honor (Note: Not to be confused with "Copa de Honor". Only includes matches that were played independently of the Uruguayan Championship from 1925 to 1940, as well as the match from December 5th, 1943 (2–3). Does not include the October 18, 1964 (2–1) match, part of the Copa de Honor and the Uruguayan Championship.) | 6 | 0 | 3 | 3 | 5 | 11 |
| Copa Albion (Note: Domestic cup held 1919–1922, named after River Plate F.C. executive.) | 6 | 2 | 3 | 1 | 8 | 7 |
| Copa León Peyrou (Note: Domestic cup held 1916–1921.) | 1 | 0 | 0 | 1 | 1 | 3 |
| Copa José Serrato (Note: Domestic cup named after José Serrato, the 24th. president of Uruguay. Held 1928–1930) | 2 | 0 | 1 | 1 | 1 | 2 |
| Torneo Intermedio (Note: First held in 2017, it is played between the Apertura and Clausura seasons.) | 2 | 1 | 0 | 1 | 3 | 5 |
| Copa de Competencia (Note: Post-CURCC period, until 1925.) | 5 | 1 | 0 | 4 | 3 | 9 |
| Liga Mayor (Note: Held 1976–1978.) | 8 | 0 | 5 | 3 | 6 | 10 |
| Torneo Cuadrangular (Note: Held 1952–1968.) | 16 | 4 | 6 | 6 | 19 | 22 |
| Campeonato General Artigas (Note: Held 1960–1962.) | 1 | 0 | 1 | 0 | 1 | 1 |
| Other competitions (Note: Includes the South American Youth Championships (1954), Torneo Ciudad de Montevideo (1973), Torneo Campeones Olímpicos (1974), Copa de Oro (1982), Campeonato Estadio Centenario (1983) y Torneo 60º Aniversario de Colombes (1984) tournaments.) | 6 | 2 | 1 | 3 | 6 | 7 |
| Copa Libertadores | 38 | 13 | 15 | 10 | 44 | 41 |
| Copa Sudamericana | 38 | 13 | 15 | 10 | 44 | 41 |
| Copa Mercosur | 2 | 1 | 1 | 0 | 2 | 1 |
| Supercopa Libertadores | 4 | 1 | 2 | 1 | 6 | 6 |
| Total | 410 | 141 | 137 | 132 | 507 | 480 |

=== Nacional v Peñarol/CURCC ===
| M | CPW | D | NW | CPG | NG |
|---|---|---|---|---|---|
| 557 | 196 | 181 | 180 | 695 | 660 |

- Source: RSSSF, updated as of 2 April 2023.

== Title comparison ==
| Competition | Nacional | Peñarol |
|---|---|---|
| Primera División (AUF) | 50 | 52 |
| Copa Uruguay | 0 | 1 |
| Supercopa Uruguaya | 3 | 2 |
| Intercontinental Cup | 3 | 3 |
| Copa Libertadores | 3 | 5 |
| Copa Interamericana | 2 | 0 |
| Recopa Sudamericana | 1 | 0 |
| Intercontinental Champions' Supercup | 0 | 1 |
| Total | 62 | 64 |

== Basketball ==
In basketball, the first Clásico in the LUB era was played in 2021, after Peñarol's disaffiliation in 1987 and its promotions, from DTA to El Metro in 2018; and from El Metro to LUB in 2019.

=== LUB era ===
==== Matches ====
| Date | Tournament | Winner | Score | Venue | Top-scorer |
|---|---|---|---|---|---|
| 18 March 2021 | 2021 LUB | Nacional | 85–67 | Estadio 10 de Julio, Florida | Mitchell (N) 22 |
| 21 January 2022 | 2021–22 LUB | Peñarol | 76–75 | Gimnasio Unión Atlética, Montevideo | Flowers (P), Miller (N) 22 |
| 31 March 2022 | 2021–22 LUB | Peñarol | 74–64 | Palacio Contador Gastón Güelfi, Montevideo | Morrison (N) 23 |
| 24 October 2022 | 2022–23 LUB | Peñarol | 88–69 | Palacio Contador Gastón Güelfi, Montevideo | Thomas (P) 21 |
| 9 January 2023 | 2022–23 LUB | Nacional | 79–76 | Gimnasio Unión Atlética, Montevideo | Green (P) 20 |
| 12 December 2023 | 2023–24 LUB | Peñarol | 97–77 | Polideportivo del Gran Parque Central, Montevideo | Zanotta (P) 18 |
| 6 February 2024 | 2023–24 LUB | Peñarol | 79–68 | Palacio Contador Gastón Güelfi, Montevideo | Smith (N) 24 |
| 5 April 2024 | 2023–24 LUB | Nacional | 94–78 | Polideportivo del Gran Parque Central, Montevideo | Johnson (P) 27 |
| 22 April 2024 | 2023–24 LUB | Nacional | 67–63 | Palacio Contador Gastón Güelfi, Montevideo | Giorgetti (N) 20 |
| 12 November 2024 | 2024–25 LUB | Nacional | 80–78 | Polideportivo del Gran Parque Central, Montevideo | Feldeine (N) 23 |
| 18 January 2025 | 2024–25 LUB | Nacional | 89–85 | Palacio Contador Gastón Güelfi, Montevideo | Feldeine (N) 30 |
| 10 March 2025 | 2024–25 LUB | Nacional | 90–72 | Polideportivo del Gran Parque Central, Montevideo | Santos (P) 25 |
| 13 October 2025 (Note: The game started on October 10, but was suspended due to game clock issues.) | 2025–26 LUB | Peñarol | 87–62 | Polideportivo del Gran Parque Central, Montevideo | Vescovi (P) 30 |
| 8 December 2025 | 2025–26 LUB | Peñarol | 82–69 | Palacio Contador Gastón Güelfi, Montevideo | Zinaich (N) 19 |
| 8 April 2026 | 2025–26 LUB | Nacional | 78–71 | Palacio Contador Gastón Güelfi, Montevideo | Pomoli (P), Washington (P) 17 |
| 22 April 2026 | 2025–26 LUB | Peñarol | 84–82 | Polideportivo del Gran Parque Central, Montevideo | Feldeine 37 (N) |
| 16 November 2026 | 2026–27 LUB | Peñarol | 96–64 | Palacio Contador Gastón Güelfi, Montevideo | Vescovi (P) 25 |

==== History ====
| M | PW | NW | PP | NP |
|---|---|---|---|---|
| 17 | 9 | 8 | 1353 | 1294 |

==== Top scorers ====
| Rank | Player | Team | Points |
|---|---|---|---|
| 1 | (Dominican Republic) James Feldeine | Nacional | 141 |
| 2 | (Uruguay) Emiliano Serres | Peñarol | 105 |
| 3 | (Uruguay) Santiago Vescovi | Peñarol | 98 |
| 4 | (Uruguay) Patricio Prieto | Nacional | 94 |
| 5 | (Uruguay) Salvador Zanotta | Peñarol | 89 |
| 6 | (Uruguay) Luciano Parodi | Both | 79 |
| 7 | (United States) Shaquille Johnson | Peñarol | 72 |
| 8 | (Dominican Republic) Luis Santos | Peñarol | 68 |
| 9 | (Argentina) Franco Giorgetti | Nacional | 67 |
| 10 | (United States) Eric Anderson | Nacional | 62 |
| 11 | (United States) Dominique Morrison | Nacional | 61 |
| 11 | (Uruguay) Nicola Pomoli | Peñarol | 61 |
| 13 | (Uruguay) Gastón Semiglia | Nacional | 58 |
| 13 | (United States) Lee Roberts | Peñarol | 58 |
| 15 | (Uruguay) Jayson Granger | Peñarol | 57 |
