= 2022 U-20 Copa Libertadores =

South American under-20 club football tournament

Copa CONMEBOL Libertadores Sub-20 Ecuador 2022

Tournament details
- Host country: Ecuador
- City: Quito
- Dates: 5–20 February 2022
- Teams: 12 (from 10 associations)
- Venues: 3 (in 1 host city)

Final positions
- Champions: (Uruguay) Peñarol (1st title)
- Runners-up: (Ecuador) Independiente del Valle
- Third place: (Paraguay) Guaraní
- Fourth place: (Venezuela) Caracas

Tournament statistics
- Matches played: 22
- Goals scored: 67 (3.05 per match)
- Top scorer(s): (Uruguay) Francisco Sagardia (Venezuela) Saúl Guarirapa (4 goals each)

The 2022 U-20 Copa CONMEBOL Libertadores (Spanish: Copa CONMEBOL Libertadores Sub-20 2022) was the 6th edition of the U-20 CONMEBOL Libertadores (also referred to as the U-20 Copa Libertadores), South America's premier under-20 club football tournament organized by CONMEBOL. It was held in Ecuador from 5 to 20 February 2022.

The tournament was played behind closed doors due to the COVID-19 pandemic, except for the final matchday (third place match and final) which had a capacity of 50% allowed in the Estadio Rodrigo Paz Delgado.

Independiente del Valle were the defending champions having won the title in 2020. Peñarol won their first title after beating Independiente del Valle 4–3 on penalties after 1–1 draw in the final match. As winners of the 2022 U-20 Copa Libertadores, Peñarol earned the right to play against Benfica, the winners of the 2021–22 UEFA Youth League, in the 2022 Under-20 Intercontinental Cup which is a single leg match-up officially launched by CONMEBOL and UEFA on 2 June 2022.

== Teams ==
The competition will be contested by 12 teams: the title holders, the youth champions from each of the ten CONMEBOL member associations, and one additional team from the host association.

Association	Team	Qualifying method	Participation	Previous best result
Argentina	Newell's Old Boys	2021 Cuarta División (U-20) champions	1st	—
Bolivia	Blooming	2021 U-20 Copa Libertadores qualification championship champions	2nd	Group stage (2012)
Brazil	Internacional	2021 U-20 Supercopa do Brasil champions	1st	—
Chile	Universidad de Concepción	2021 U-21 Campeonato Fútbol Joven champions	1st	—
Colombia	Millonarios	2019 U-20 Súper Copa Juvenil champions	3rd	Group stage (2011, 2020)
Ecuador (hosts)	Independiente del Valle (Ecuador 1)	2020 U-20 Copa Libertadores champions	6th	Champions (2020)
Ecuador (hosts)	LDU Quito (Ecuador 2)	2021 U-18 Serie A champions	1st	—
Ecuador (hosts)	Orense (Ecuador 3)	2021 U-18 Serie A third place	1st	—
Paraguay	Guaraní	2021 U-19 Clausura champions	1st	—
Peru	Sporting Cristal	2021 U-18 Copa Generación champions	3rd	Group stage (2012, 2020)
Uruguay	Peñarol	2021 U-19 Torneo Especial champions	1st	—
Venezuela	Caracas	2021 Liga FUTVE Junior champions	2nd	Group stage (2011)

== Venues ==
Quito
Estadio Olímpico Atahualpa	Estadio Banco Guayaquil	Estadio Rodrigo Paz Delgado
Capacity: 35,258	Capacity: 12,000	Capacity: 41,575
Estadio Olímpico Atahualpa	Estadio Banco Guayaquil	Estadio Rodrigo Paz Delgado

Ecuador was named as host country of the tournament at the CONMEBOL Council meeting held on 27 October 2021. The Estadio Olímpico Atahualpa hosted the matches of groups B and C while the Estadio Banco Guayaquil, owned by Independiente del Valle, hosted the group A matches and the semi-finals. On 19 February 2022, the Estadio Rodrigo Paz Delgado, owned by LDU Quito, was included as venue of the third place match and the final that had originally been scheduled at the Estadio Banco Guayaquil. All venues are located in Quito.

== Draw ==
The draw was held on 20 December 2021, 13:30 PYST (UTC−3), at the CONMEBOL Convention Centre in Luque, Paraguay. The draw was conducted according to the following guidelines:

- The defending champions Independiente del Valle were automatically assigned to position A1 in the group stage.
- The remaining 11 teams were seeded into four pots; one of two teams and three of three teams, based on the final placement of their national association's club in the previous edition of the tournament, and drawn into three groups of four.
- The teams from the two best associations (Ecuador and Argentina) were seeded into Pot 1 and drawn to position B1 or C1 in the group stage. The first team drawn was placed into Group B, the second team drawn placed into Group C
- The teams from the next three associations (Brazil, Paraguay and Venezuela) were seeded into Pot 2 and drawn to position A2, B2 or C2 in the group stage.
- The teams from the next three associations (Chile, Uruguay, and Peru) were seeded into Pot 3 and drawn to position A3, B3 or C3 in the group stage.
- The teams from the last two associations (Colombia and Bolivia) and the additional team from the host association (Ecuador) were seeded into Pot 4 and drawn to position A4, B4 or C4 in the group stage.
- From pots 2, 3 and 4, the first team drawn was placed into Group A, the second team drawn placed into Group B and the final team drawn placed into Group C. Teams from the same association could not be drawn into the same group.

Pot 1	Pot 2	Pot 3	Pot 4
(Ecuador) LDU Quito; (Argentina) Newell's Old Boys	(Brazil) Internacional; (Paraguay) Guaraní; (Venezuela) Caracas	(Chile) Universidad de Concepción; (Uruguay) Peñarol; (Peru) Sporting Cristal	(Colombia) Millonarios; (Bolivia) Blooming; (Ecuador) Orense

The draw resulted in the following groups:

Group A
Pos	Team
A1	(Ecuador) Independiente del Valle
A2	(Venezuela) Caracas
A3	(Peru) Sporting Cristal
A4	(Bolivia) Blooming

Group B
Pos	Team
B1	(Ecuador) LDU Quito
B2	(Brazil) Internacional
B3	(Uruguay) Peñarol
B4	(Colombia) Millonarios

Group C
Pos	Team
C1	(Argentina) Newell's Old Boys
C2	(Paraguay) Guaraní
C3	(Chile) Universidad de Concepción
C4	(Ecuador) Orense

== Match officials ==
On 28 December 2021, CONMEBOL informed to its member associations the referees appointed for the tournament. Assistant referee Guilherme Dias Camilo was replaced by Bruno Boschilia, both from Brazil.

- (Argentina) Nicolás Lamolina
  - Assistants: José Miguel Savorani and Sebastián Raineri
- (Bolivia) Dilio Rodríguez
  - Assistants: Carlos Tapia and Rubén Flores
- (Brazil) Flavio de Souza
  - Assistants: Rafael Alves and Bruno Boschilia
- (Chile) Cristian Garay
  - Assistants: Miguel Rocha and Juan Serrano
- (Colombia) Carlos Ortega
  - Assistants: Miguel Roldán and David Fuentes

- (Ecuador) Marlon Vera
  - Assistants: David Vacacela and Edison Vásquez
- (Paraguay) Carlos Paul Benítez
  - Assistants: Luis Onieva and José Villagra
- (Peru) Augusto Menéndez
  - Assistants: Enrique Pinto and Leonar Soto
- (Uruguay) Gustavo Tejera
  - Assistants: Pablo Llarena and Andrés Nievas
- (Venezuela) Yender Herrera
  - Assistants: Yackson Díaz and Antoni García

Support Referees

- (Colombia) Jhon Hinestroza

- (Peru) Edwin Ordóñez

== Squads ==
Players born on or after 1 January 2002 were eligible to compete. Each team could register a maximum of 20 and a minimum of 16 players, two of whom should have been goalkeepers (Regulations Article 31).

== Group stage ==
The winners of each group and the best runner-up among all groups will advance to the semi-finals.

Tiebreakers

In the group stage, the teams will be ranked according to points earned (3 points for a win, 1 point for a draw, 0 points for a loss). If tied on points, tiebreakers will be applied in the following order (Regulations Article 20):

1. Goal difference;
2. Goals scored;
3. Head-to-head result in games between tied teams;
4. Fewest number of red cards received;
5. Fewest number of yellow cards received;
6. Drawing of lots.

All match times are in ECT (UTC−5), as listed by CONMEBOL.

=== Group A ===
Pos	Team	Pld	W	D	L	GF	GA	GD	Pts	Qualification
1	(Ecuador) Independiente del Valle (H)	3	3	0	0	13	1	+12	9	Semi-finals
2	(Venezuela) Caracas	3	2	0	1	6	4	+2	6	Semi-finals
3	(Peru) Sporting Cristal	3	1	0	2	6	12	−6	3	
4	(Bolivia) Blooming	3	0	0	3	0	8	−8	0	

Source: CONMEBOL
(H) Hosts
5 February 2022
15:00

Independiente del Valle (Ecuador)	3–0	(Venezuela) Caracas
Mercado 8'; Acosta 20'; Sagardia 69'	Report

Estadio Banco Guayaquil, Quito
Attendance: 0
Referee: Flavio de Souza (Brazil)
5 February 2022
17:30

Sporting Cristal (Peru)	4–0	(Bolivia) Blooming
Grimaldo 13', 46'; Paredes 35'; Perea 56'	Report

Estadio Banco Guayaquil, Quito
Attendance: 0
Referee: Nicolás Lamolina (Argentina)

8 February 2022
15:00

Independiente del Valle (Ecuador)	7–1	(Peru) Sporting Cristal
Acosta 14'; Valencia 23'; Sagardia 30'; Mejía 38', 68'; Caicedo 71'; Carcelén 81' (pen.)	Report	Paredes 9'

Estadio Banco Guayaquil, Quito
Attendance: 0
Referee: Gustavo Tejera (Uruguay)
8 February 2022
17:30

Caracas (Venezuela)	1–0	(Bolivia) Blooming
Albizo 73'	Report

Estadio Banco Guayaquil, Quito
Attendance: 0
Referee: Carlos Ortega (Colombia)

11 February 2022
15:00

Blooming (Bolivia)	0–3	(Ecuador) Independiente del Valle
	Report	Caicedo 28'; Medina 48'; Angulo 55' (pen.)

Estadio Banco Guayaquil, Quito
Attendance: 0
Referee: Jhon Hinestroza (Colombia)
11 February 2022
17:30

Caracas (Venezuela)	5–1	(Peru) Sporting Cristal
Sulbarán 37'; Guarirapa 58', 69', 89'; Guerra 90+3'	Report	Perea 84' (pen.)

Estadio Banco Guayaquil, Quito
Attendance: 0
Referee: Dilio Rodríguez (Bolivia)

=== Group B ===
Pos	Team	Pld	W	D	L	GF	GA	GD	Pts	Qualification
1	(Uruguay) Peñarol	3	2	1	0	5	1	+4	7	Semi-finals
2	(Colombia) Millonarios	3	2	0	1	3	3	0	6	
3	(Ecuador) LDU Quito (H)	3	1	0	2	2	4	−2	3	
4	(Brazil) Internacional	3	0	1	2	1	3	−2	1	

Source: CONMEBOL
(H) Hosts
6 February 2022
15:00

LDU Quito (Ecuador)	1–0	(Brazil) Internacional
Angulo 67'	Report

Estadio Olímpico Atahualpa, Quito
Attendance: 0
Referee: Yender Herrera (Venezuela)
6 February 2022
17:30

Peñarol (Uruguay)	2–0	(Colombia) Millonarios
Cruz 25', 46'	Report

Estadio Olímpico Atahualpa, Quito
Attendance: 0
Referee: Augusto Menéndez (Peru)

9 February 2022
15:00

LDU Quito (Ecuador)	0–2	(Uruguay) Peñarol
	Report	Díaz 52'; Cruz 90+9'

Estadio Olímpico Atahualpa, Quito
Attendance: 0
Referee: Carlos Benítez (Paraguay)
9 February 2022
17:30

Internacional (Brazil)	0–1	(Colombia) Millonarios
	Report	Carvajal 28'

Estadio Olímpico Atahualpa, Quito
Attendance: 0
Referee: Cristian Garay (Chile)

12 February 2022
15:00

Millonarios (Colombia)	2–1	(Ecuador) LDU Quito
Gómez 38'; Oñate 86'	Report	Sosa 79' (pen.)

Estadio Olímpico Atahualpa, Quito
Attendance: 0
Referee: Nicolás Lamolina (Argentina)
12 February 2022
17:30

Internacional (Brazil)	1–1	(Uruguay) Peñarol
Lucas Dias 17'	Report	Ferreira 78'

Estadio Olímpico Atahualpa, Quito
Attendance: 0
Referee: Augusto Menéndez (Peru)

=== Group C ===
Pos	Team	Pld	W	D	L	GF	GA	GD	Pts	Qualification
1	(Paraguay) Guaraní	3	2	0	1	5	2	+3	6	Semi-finals
2	(Argentina) Newell's Old Boys	3	2	0	1	4	2	+2	6	
3	(Ecuador) Orense (H)	3	2	0	1	5	5	0	6	
4	(Chile) Universidad de Concepción	3	0	0	3	3	8	−5	0	

Source: CONMEBOL
(H) Hosts
7 February 2022
15:00

Newell's Old Boys (Argentina)	0–1	(Paraguay) Guaraní
	Report	Segovia 67'

Estadio Olímpico Atahualpa, Quito
Attendance: 0
Referee: Marlon Vera (Ecuador)
7 February 2022
17:30

Universidad de Concepción (Chile)	2–3	(Ecuador) Orense
Vásquez 11' (pen.); Fernández 69'	Report	Quiñónez 8', 19'; Chamba 84'

Estadio Olímpico Atahualpa, Quito
Attendance: 0
Referee: Dilio Rodríguez (Bolivia)

10 February 2022
15:00

Newell's Old Boys (Argentina)	1–0	(Chile) Universidad de Concepción
Pacheco 35' (o.g.)	Report

Estadio Olímpico Atahualpa, Quito
Attendance: 0
Referee: Flavio de Souza (Brazil)
10 February 2022
17:30

Guaraní (Paraguay)	0–1	(Ecuador) Orense
	Report	Coronel 29'

Estadio Olímpico Atahualpa, Quito
Attendance: 0
Referee: Yender Herrera (Venezuela)

13 February 2022
15:00

Orense (Ecuador)	1–3	(Argentina) Newell's Old Boys
Plúas 72'	Report	Messi 26'; Rossi 77'; Contrera 84'

Estadio Olímpico Atahualpa, Quito
Attendance: 0
Referee: Gustavo Tejera (Uruguay)
13 February 2022
17:30

Guaraní (Paraguay)	4–1	(Chile) Universidad de Concepción
Adorno 9', 73'; Segovia 24'; A. Benítez 70'	Report	Rodríguez 90' (o.g.)

Estadio Olímpico Atahualpa, Quito
Attendance: 0
Referee: Carlos Ortega (Colombia)

=== Ranking of group runners-up ===
Pos	Grp	Team	Pld	W	D	L	GF	GA	GD	Pts	Qualification
1	A	(Venezuela) Caracas	3	2	0	1	6	4	+2	6	Semi-finals
2	C	(Argentina) Newell's Old Boys	3	2	0	1	4	2	+2	6	
3	B	(Colombia) Millonarios	3	2	0	1	3	3	0	6	

Source: CONMEBOL
Rules for classification: 1) Points; 2) Goal difference; 3) Goals scored; 4) Red cards received; 5) Yellow cards received; 6) Drawing of lots (Regulations Article 21).

== Final stage ==
The final stage consisted of the semi-finals, the third place match and the final. The semi-final matchups will be:

- Group A winner vs. Group C winner
- Group B winner vs. Best runner-up

The semi-final winners and losers played in the final and third place match respectively. If a game was tied after full time, extra time would not be played, and a penalty shoot-out would be used to determine the winner (Regulations Article 23).

The final matchday, which consisted of the third place match and the final, was moved from Estadio Banco Guayaquil to Estadio Rodrigo Paz Delgado due to the original venue's field was damaged as a result of the heavy rains that occurred in Quito.

All match times are in ECT (UTC−5), as listed by CONMEBOL.

=== Bracket ===
Semi-finals
17 February
(Ecuador) Independiente del Valle	3
(Paraguay) Guaraní	1
17 February
(Uruguay) Peñarol	2
(Venezuela) Caracas	1

Final
20 February
(Ecuador) Independiente del Valle	1 (3)
(Uruguay) Peñarol (p)	1 (4)
Third place
20 February
(Paraguay) Guaraní	3
(Venezuela) Caracas	2

=== Semi-finals ===
17 February 2022
15:00

Independiente del Valle (Ecuador)	3–1	(Paraguay) Guaraní
Sagardia 43' (pen.), 56'; Valencia 74' (pen.)	Report	R. Benitez 87' (pen.)

Estadio Banco Guayaquil, Quito
Attendance: 0
Referee: Nicolás Lamolina (Argentina)

17 February 2022
17:30

Peñarol (Uruguay)	2–1	(Venezuela) Caracas
Alonso 12', 61'	Report	Sulbarán 26'

Estadio Banco Guayaquil, Quito
Attendance: 0
Referee: Carlos Ortega (Colombia)

=== Third place match ===
20 February 2022
15:00

Guaraní (Paraguay)	3–2	(Venezuela) Caracas
Adorno 48'; R. Benitez 73'; López 88'	Report	Molleda 21'; Guarirapa 76'

Estadio Rodrigo Paz Delgado, Quito
Referee: Cristian Garay (Chile)

=== Final ===
20 February 2022
18:00

Independiente del Valle (Ecuador)	1–1	(Uruguay) Peñarol
Delgado 90'	Report	Méndez 76'
Penalties
Medina (penalty scored); Sagardia (penalty scored); Delgado (penalty scored); Carcelén (penalty missed); Mina (penalty missed)	3–4	(penalty scored) Ferreira; (penalty scored) Méndez; (penalty scored) Homenchenko; (penalty missed) Rodríguez; (penalty scored) Alonso

Estadio Rodrigo Paz Delgado, Quito
Referee: Flavio de Souza (Brazil)

== Statistics ==
=== Top goalscorers ===
Rank	Player	Team	Goals
1	(Venezuela) Saúl Guarirapa	(Venezuela) Caracas	4
1	(Uruguay) Francisco Sagardia	(Ecuador) Independiente del Valle	4
2	(Paraguay) Milciades Adorno	(Paraguay) Guaraní	3
2	(Uruguay) Óscar José Cruz	(Uruguay) Peñarol	3
3	(Ecuador) Neicer Acosta	(Ecuador) Independiente del Valle	2
3	(Uruguay) Máximo Alonso	(Uruguay) Peñarol	2
3	(Paraguay) Romeo Benítez	(Paraguay) Guaraní	2
3	(Ecuador) Maikel Caicedo	(Ecuador) Independiente del Valle	2
3	(Peru) Joao Grimaldo	(Peru) Sporting Cristal	2
3	(Ecuador) Adrián Mejía	(Ecuador) Independiente del Valle	2
3	(Peru) Gilmar Paredes	(Peru) Sporting Cristal	2
3	(Peru) Marlon Perea	(Peru) Sporting Cristal	2
3	(Ecuador) Bryan Quiñónez	(Ecuador) Orense	2
3	(Paraguay) Matías Segovia	(Paraguay) Guaraní	2
3	(Venezuela) Manuel Sulbarán	(Venezuela) Caracas	2
3	(Ecuador) Anthony Valencia	(Ecuador) Independiente del Valle	2

=== Final ranking ===
As per statistical convention in football, matches decided in extra time were counted as wins and losses, while matches decided by penalty shoot-out were counted as draws.

Pos	Team	Pld	W	D	L	GF	GA	GD	Pts	Final result
1st place, gold medalist(s)	(Uruguay) Peñarol	5	3	2	0	8	3	+5	11	Champions
2nd place, silver medalist(s)	(Ecuador) Independiente del Valle	5	4	1	0	17	3	+14	13	Runners-up
3rd place, bronze medalist(s)	(Paraguay) Guaraní	5	3	0	2	9	7	+2	9	Third place
4	(Venezuela) Caracas	5	2	0	3	9	9	0	6	Fourth place
5	(Argentina) Newell's Old Boys	3	2	0	1	4	2	+2	6	Eliminated in Group stage
6	(Ecuador) Orense	3	2	0	1	5	5	0	6	Eliminated in Group stage
7	(Colombia) Millonarios	3	2	0	1	3	3	0	6	Eliminated in Group stage
8	(Ecuador) LDU Quito	3	1	0	2	2	4	−2	3	Eliminated in Group stage
9	(Peru) Sporting Cristal	3	1	0	2	6	12	−6	3	Eliminated in Group stage
10	(Brazil) Internacional	3	0	1	2	1	3	−2	1	Eliminated in Group stage
11	(Chile) Universidad de Concepción	3	0	0	3	3	8	−5	0	Eliminated in Group stage
12	(Bolivia) Blooming	3	0	0	3	0	8	−8	0	Eliminated in Group stage

Updated to match(es) played on 13 February 2022. Source:
Rules for classification: Only for 5th to 12th place. 1) Points; 2) Goal difference; 3) Goals scored; 4) Fewest red cards received; 5) Fewest yellow cards received; 6) Drawing of lots (Regulations Article 22).
