= 2017 South American U-15 Championship =

2017 South American Under-15 Football Championship
CONMEBOL Campeonato Sudamericano Sub-15 Argentina 2017

Tournament details
- Host country: Argentina
- Dates: 5–19 November
- Teams: 12 (from 2 confederations)
- Venue: 3 (in 2 host cities)

Final positions
- Champions: Argentina (1st title)
- Runners-up: Brazil

Tournament statistics
- Matches played: 33
- Goals scored: 142 (4.3 per match)
- Top scorer: (Colombia) Juan Alegría (10 goals)

The 2017 South American Under-15 Football Championship was the 8th edition of the South American Under-15 Football Championship, the biennial international youth football championship organised by the CONMEBOL for the men's under-15 national teams of South America. The tournament was held in Argentina between 5 and 19 November 2017.

Each match has a duration of 80 minutes, consisting of two halves of 40 minutes with a 15-minute half-time. Up to five substitutions may be made for each team in a match.

Host team Argentina won their first South American U-15 title by defeating the defending champions Brazil 3–2 in the final.

== Teams ==
All ten CONMEBOL member national teams entered the tournament. Moreover, two teams from UEFA were invited to compete.

Team	Appearance	Previous best top-4 performance
Argentina (hosts)	8th	Runners-up (2005)
Bolivia	8th	Fourth place (2005)
Brazil (holders)	8th	Champions (2005, 2007, 2011, 2015)
Chile	8th	Fourth place (2007, 2013)
Colombia	8th	Runners-up (2004, 2011, 2013)
Croatia (invited team)	1st	None
Czech Republic (invited team)	1st	None
Ecuador	8th	Third place (2009)
Paraguay	8th	Champions (2004, 2009)
Peru	8th	Champions (2013)
Uruguay	8th	Runners-up (2007, 2015)
Venezuela	8th	None

== Venues ==
Argentina was named as host of the tournament at the 67th Ordinary CONMEBOL Congress held on 26 April 2017 in Santiago, Chile. San Juan and Mendoza were chosen as host cities and ratified by CONMEBOL on 11 October 2017.

The matches were originally scheduled to be played in two stadiums. Due to the semi-final of the Copa Argentina played at Estadio Malvinas Argentinas on 12 November 2017, two matches were moved to Estadio Víctor Antonio Legrotaglie.

Mendoza	2017 South American U-15 Championship is located in Argentina
Estadio Malvinas Argentinas	2017 South American U-15 Championship is located in Argentina
Capacity: 42,500	2017 South American U-15 Championship is located in Argentina
Estadio Víctor Antonio Legrotaglie	2017 South American U-15 Championship is located in Argentina
Capacity: 11,500	2017 South American U-15 Championship is located in Argentina
San Juan	2017 South American U-15 Championship is located in Argentina
Estadio San Juan del Bicentenario	2017 South American U-15 Championship is located in Argentina
Capacity: 25,286	2017 South American U-15 Championship is located in Argentina

== Draw ==
The draw was held on 13 October 2017, 17:30 ART (UTC−3), at the Salón Cruce de los Andes in the Civic Center of the Province of San Juan. The 12 teams were drawn into two groups of six teams. The hosts Argentina were seeded into Group A, while the title holders Brazil were seeded into Group B. The remaining teams were seeded based on the results in the 2015 South American Under-15 Football Championship.

== Squads ==
Players born on or after 1 January 2002 are eligible to compete in the tournament. Each team has to submit a squad of 22 players, including a minimum of three goalkeepers (Regulations Article 5.2).

== Match officials ==
The referees and assistants referees were:

- (Argentina) Fernando Espinoza
  - Assistants: Julio Fernández and Maximiliano Del Yesso
- (Bolivia) Ivo Méndez
  - Assistants: Edwar Saavedra and Reluy Vallejos
- (Brazil) Wagner Reway
  - Assistants: Alex Ang Ribeiro and Cleberson Nascimento
- (Chile) Piero Maza
  - Assistants: Claudio Urrutia and Alejandro Molina
- (Colombia) Andrés Rojas
  - Assistants: Sebastián Vela and Miguel Roldán
- (Ecuador) Luis Quiroz
  - Assistants: Ricardo Baren and Juan Aguiar
- (Paraguay) Arnaldo Samaniego
  - Assistants: Robero Cañete and José Cuevas
- (Peru) Joel Alarcón
  - Assistants: Michael Orué and Jesús Sánchez
- (Uruguay) Esteban Ostojich
  - Assistants: Carlos Javier Barreiro and Martín Soppi
- (Venezuela) Alexis Herrera
  - Assistants: Tulio Moreno and Alberto Ponte

Support Referees

- (Argentina) Facundo Tello
  - Assistant: Maximiliano Castelli

== Group stage ==
The top two teams of each group advance to the semi-finals.

Tiebreakers

The teams are ranked according to points (3 points for a win, 1 point for a draw, 0 points for a loss). If tied on points, tiebreakers would be applied in the following order (Regulations Article 18.1):

1. Goal difference in all games;
2. Goals scored in all games;
3. Head-to-head result in games between tied teams;
4. Drawing of lots.

All times are local, ART (UTC−3).

=== Group A ===
Pos	Team	Pld	W	D	L	GF	GA	GD	Pts	Qualification
1	Argentina (H)	5	3	2	0	18	8	+10	11	Knockout stage
2	Paraguay	5	3	0	2	13	8	+5	9	Knockout stage
3	Chile	5	2	2	1	12	6	+6	8	
4	Colombia	5	2	1	2	19	8	+11	7	
5	Uruguay	5	1	3	1	13	7	+6	6	
6	Czech Republic (G)	5	0	0	5	5	43	−38	0	

Source: CONMEBOL
Rules for classification: Group stage tiebreakers
(G) Guests; (H) Hosts
5 November 2017
16:30

Uruguay	1–1	Chile
Sosa 78'	Report	Pizarro 49'

Estadio San Juan del Bicentenario, San Juan
Referee: Alexis Herrera (Venezuela)
5 November 2017
18:45

Czech Republic	2–7	Paraguay
Vecheta ?'; Nízký 48'	Report	D. Duarte 10', 56', 62'; Velázquez 35'; Torres 38', 51' (pen.); Viera 72'

Estadio San Juan del Bicentenario, San Juan
Referee: Luis Quiroz (Ecuador)
5 November 2017
21:30

Argentina	3–2	Colombia
Godoy 20'; Versaci 24' (pen.); Palacios 31'	Report	Arroyo 54'; Alegría 80'

Estadio San Juan del Bicentenario, San Juan
Referee: Wagner Reway (Brazil)

7 November 2017
16:30

Paraguay	2–3	Colombia
D. Duarte 18', 33'	Report	Alegría 26', 74', 79'

Estadio San Juan del Bicentenario, San Juan
Referee: Joel Alarcón (Peru)
7 November 2017
18:45

Chile	7–0	Czech Republic
Sepúlveda ?'; Tapia ?', ?'; Arriagada ?'; Pérez ?'; Cisterna ?'; Cartagena ?'	Report

Estadio San Juan del Bicentenario, San Juan
Referee: Ivo Méndez (Bolivia)
7 November 2017
21:00

Argentina	2–2	Uruguay
Zeballos ?', ?'	Report	Gutiérrez 25' (pen.); Arezo 44'

Estadio San Juan del Bicentenario, San Juan
Referee: Luis Quiroz (Ecuador)

9 November 2017
16:30

Colombia	1–1	Uruguay
Arroyo 25'	Report	Arezo 49'

Estadio San Juan del Bicentenario, San Juan
Referee: Alexis Herrera (Venezuela)
9 November 2017
18:45

Paraguay	2–0	Chile
López 33'; D. Duarte 54'	Report

Estadio San Juan del Bicentenario, San Juan
Referee: Wagner Reway (Brazil)
9 November 2017
21:00

Argentina	8–2	Czech Republic
Palacios 3'; Benítez 12', ?'; Krilanovich ?'; Sforza ?', ?'; Zeballos ?', ?'	Report	Kozel 25'; Šíp ?'

Estadio San Juan del Bicentenario, San Juan
Referee: Joel Alarcón (Peru)

11 November 2017
16:30

Uruguay	0–2	Paraguay
	Report	D. Duarte 56', 75'

Estadio San Juan del Bicentenario, San Juan
Referee: Joel Alarcón (Peru)
11 November 2017
18:45

Colombia	12–0	Czech Republic
Alegría ?', ?', ?', ?', ?'; Arroyo ?', ?', ?'; Mosquera ?'; Mena ?'; Saer ?'; Cuesta ?'	Report

Estadio San Juan del Bicentenario, San Juan
Referee: Wagner Reway (Brazil)
11 November 2017
21:00

Argentina	2–2	Chile
Flores 12'; Krilanovich ?'	Report	Sepúlveda 38'; Tapia 68'

Estadio San Juan del Bicentenario, San Juan
Referee: Ivo Méndez (Bolivia)

13 November 2017
16:30

Chile	2–1	Colombia
Tapia 49' (pen.); Arriagada 77'	Report	Alegría 80'

Estadio San Juan del Bicentenario, San Juan
Referee: Luis Quiroz (Ecuador)
13 November 2017
18:45

Czech Republic	1–9	Uruguay
Karabec ?'	Report	Gutiérrez ?', ?', ?'; Arezo ?', ?', ?'; Alonso ?'; Ocampo ?', ?'

Estadio San Juan del Bicentenario, San Juan
Referee: Ivo Méndez (Bolivia)
13 November 2017
21:00

Argentina	3–0	Paraguay
Zeballos ?'; Orozco ?', ?'	Report

Estadio San Juan del Bicentenario, San Juan
Referee: Alexis Herrera (Venezuela)

=== Group B ===
Pos	Team	Pld	W	D	L	GF	GA	GD	Pts	Qualification
1	Brazil	5	5	0	0	17	1	+16	15	Knockout stage
2	Peru	5	2	2	1	8	7	+1	8	Knockout stage
3	Ecuador	5	2	2	1	7	6	+1	8	
4	Venezuela	5	1	2	2	5	7	−2	5	
5	Bolivia	5	1	1	3	8	16	−8	4	
6	Croatia (G)	5	0	1	4	4	12	−8	1	

Source: CONMEBOL
Rules for classification: Group stage tiebreakers
(G) Guests
6 November 2017
16:30

Ecuador	0–0	Venezuela
	Report

Estadio Malvinas Argentinas, Mendoza
Referee: Esteban Ostojich (Uruguay)
6 November 2017
18:45

Croatia	0–3	Peru
	Report	Ruiz 12', 80'; Cavero 28'

Estadio Malvinas Argentinas, Mendoza
Referee: Fernando Espinoza (Argentina)
6 November 2017
21:00

Brazil	5–0	Bolivia
Cadu 31'; Gabriel Veron 47'; Peglow 54'; Pedro Arthur 70'; Kaio Jorge 75'	Report

Estadio Malvinas Argentinas, Mendoza
Referee: Andrés Rojas (Colombia)

8 November 2017
16:30

Peru	4–1	Bolivia
Cavero 18'; De la Cruz 38'; Ruiz 48'; Celi 63'	Report	Tomé de Araujo 20'

Estadio Malvinas Argentinas, Mendoza
Referee: Arnaldo Samaniego (Paraguay)
8 November 2017
18:45

Venezuela	2–1	Croatia
Pérez 16'; Cordero 65' (pen.)	Report	Jiménez 34' (o.g.)

Estadio Malvinas Argentinas, Mendoza
Referee: Piero Maza (Chile)
8 November 2017
21:00

Brazil	2–0	Ecuador
Reinier 15'; Kaká 47'	Report

Estadio Malvinas Argentinas, Mendoza
Referee: Fernando Espinoza (Argentina)

10 November 2017
16:30

Bolivia	2–3	Ecuador
Zeballos 36'; Briceño 79'	Report	Mina 10'; Plúas 12'; Romero 41'

Estadio Malvinas Argentinas, Mendoza
Referee: Andrés Rojas (Colombia)
10 November 2017
18:45

Peru	0–0	Venezuela
	Report

Estadio Malvinas Argentinas, Mendoza
Referee: Esteban Ostojich (Uruguay)
10 November 2017
21:00

Brazil	2–0	Croatia
Peglow 41'; Kaio Jorge 67' (pen.)	Report

Estadio Malvinas Argentinas, Mendoza
Referee: Fernando Echenique (Argentina)

12 November 2017
16:30

Ecuador	1–1	Peru
Acosta 31'	Report	Celi 67'

Estadio Víctor Antonio Legrotaglie, Mendoza
Referee: Arnaldo Samaniego (Paraguay)
12 November 2017
16:30

Bolivia	2–2	Croatia
Flores ?'; Romero ?'	Report	Šaranić ?'; Barišić ?'

Estadio Malvinas Argentinas, Mendoza
Referee: Facundo Tello (Argentina)
12 November 2017
21:00

Brazil	3–1	Venezuela
Kaká 20'; Reinier 40'; Ivonei 70'	Report	Peña 80'

Estadio Víctor Antonio Legrotaglie, Mendoza
Referee: Piero Maza (Chile)

14 November 2017
16:30

Venezuela	2–3	Bolivia
Pérez 50'; Paz 68'	Report	Tomé de Araujo 25'; Romero 34'; Briceño 80'

Estadio Malvinas Argentinas, Mendoza
Referee: Arnaldo Samaniego (Paraguay)
14 November 2017
18:45

Croatia	1–3	Ecuador
Barišić ?'	Report	Morán 45'; Romero 67', 77'

Estadio Malvinas Argentinas, Mendoza
Referee: Piero Maza (Chile)
14 November 2017
21:00

Brazil	5–0	Peru
Diego Rosa 1'; Peglow 9'; Gabriel Silva 19', 47'; Pedro Arthur 24'	Report

Estadio Malvinas Argentinas, Mendoza
Referee: Fernando Espinoza (Argentina)

== Knockout stage ==
If tied after regulation time, extra time is not played, and the penalty shoot-out is used to determine the winner (Regulations Article 18.3).

=== Bracket ===
Semi-finals
17 November – Malvinas Argentinas
Brazil	2
Paraguay	1
17 November – Bicentenario
Argentina	4
Peru	1

Final
19 November – Bicentenario
Brazil	2
Argentina	3

=== Semi-finals ===
17 November 2017
18:45

Brazil	2–1	Paraguay
Peglow 5'; Diego Rosa 36'	Report	B. Duarte 45'

Estadio Malvinas Argentinas, Mendoza
Referee: Esteban Ostojich (Uruguay)

17 November 2017
21:00

Argentina	4–1	Peru
Godoy 23', 40' (pen.); Sforza 51'; Amione 59'	Report	Huayhua 25'

Estadio San Juan del Bicentenario, San Juan
Referee: Luis Quiroz (Ecuador)

=== Final ===
19 November 2017
19:45

Brazil	2–3	Argentina
Kaio Jorge 33', 41'	Report	Palacios 43'; Godoy 46'; Amione 74'

Estadio San Juan del Bicentenario, San Juan
Referee: Alexis Herrera (Venezuela)

2017 South American Under-15 Football champions

Argentina
First title

== Goalscorers ==
There were 142 goals scored in 33 matches, for an average of 4.3 goals per match.

10 goals

- (Colombia) Juan Alegría

8 goals

- (Paraguay) Diego Duarte

5 goals

- (Argentina) Exequiel Zeballos
- (Colombia) Andrés Arroyo
- (Uruguay) Matías Arezo

4 goals

- (Argentina) Matías Godoy
- (Brazil) Kaio Jorge
- (Brazil) João Peglow
- (Chile) Gonzalo Tapia
- (Uruguay) Juan Manuel Gutiérrez

3 goals

- (Argentina) Matías Palacios
- (Argentina) Juan Sforza
- (Ecuador) Georginton Romero
- (Peru) Carlos Ruiz

2 goals

- (Argentina) Bruno Amione
- (Argentina) Valentín Benítez
- (Argentina) Juan Pablo Krilanovich
- (Argentina) Franco Orozco
- (Bolivia) José Miguel Briceño
- (Bolivia) Matias Romero
- (Bolivia) Robson Tomé de Araujo
- (Brazil) Kaká
- (Brazil) Pedro Arthur
- (Brazil) Diego Rosa
- (Brazil) Reinier
- (Brazil) Gabriel Silva
- (Chile) Luciano Arriagada
- (Chile) Kennan Sepúlveda
- (Croatia) Bartol Barišić
- (Paraguay) Diego Torres
- (Peru) Sebastián Cavero
- (Peru) Yuriel Celi
- (Uruguay) Matías Ocampo
- (Venezuela) Daniel Pérez

1 goal

- (Argentina) Francisco Flores
- (Argentina) Federico Versaci
- (Bolivia) José Alfredo Flores
- (Bolivia) Luis Zeballos
- (Brazil) Cadu
- (Brazil) Ivonei
- (Brazil) Gabriel Veron
- (Chile) Yeiko Cartagena
- (Chile) Rodrigo Cisterna
- (Chile) César Pérez
- (Chile) Vicente Pizarro
- (Colombia) Jesús Manuel Cuesta
- (Colombia) Camilo Mena
- (Colombia) Yoni Mosquera
- (Colombia) Daniel Saer
- (Croatia) Ivan Šaranić
- (Czech Republic) Adam Karabec
- (Czech Republic) Štěpán Kozel
- (Czech Republic) Filip Nízký
- (Czech Republic) Filip Vecheta
- (Czech Republic) Jáchym Šíp
- (Ecuador) Néicer Acosta
- (Ecuador) Johan Mina
- (Ecuador) Jordan Morán
- (Ecuador) Erick Plúas
- (Paraguay) Basilio Duarte
- (Paraguay) Rodrigo López
- (Paraguay) Walter Velázquez
- (Paraguay) Wilder Viera
- (Peru) Pedro De la Cruz
- (Peru) José Huayhua
- (Uruguay) Máximo Alonso
- (Uruguay) Joaquín Sosa
- (Venezuela) Yorlen Cordero
- (Venezuela) Darluis Paz
- (Venezuela) Luis Ángel Peña

1 own goal

- (Venezuela) Óscar Jiménez (playing against Croatia)
