= 2017 in Peruvian football =

Football in Peru
- Season: 2017

Men's football
- Torneo Descentralizado: Alianza Lima
- Segunda División: Sport Boys
- Copa Perú: Carlos Stein

Women's football
- Copa Perú: JC Sport Girls

The 2017 season in Peruvian football included all the matches of the different national male and female teams, as well as the local club tournaments, and the participation of these in international competitions in which representatives of the country's teams had participated.

== National teams ==
=== Peru national football team ===
==== Kits ====
Home	Away

==== 2018 FIFA World Cup qualification ====
23 March 2018 FIFA World Cup qualification	Venezuela	2–2	Peru	Maturín
19:30 VET (UTC−4)	Villanueva 23'; Otero 39'	Report	Carrillo 46'; Guerrero 64'	Stadium: Estadio Monumental de Maturín; Attendance: 35,920; Referee: Enrique Cáceres (PAR)

28 March 2018 FIFA World Cup qualification	Peru	2–1	Uruguay	Lima
21:15 PET (UTC−5)	Guerrero 34'; Flores 62'	Report	Sánchez 30'	Stadium: Estadio Nacional; Attendance: 35,200; Referee: Julio Bascuñán (CHI)

31 August 2018 FIFA World Cup qualification	Peru	2–1	Bolivia	Lima
21:15 PET (UTC−5)	Flores 55'; Cueva 58'	Report	Álvarez 72'	Stadium: Monumental "U"; Attendance: 50,501; Referee: Andrés Cunha (URU)

5 September 2018 FIFA World Cup qualification	Ecuador	1–2	Peru	Quito
16:00 ECT (UTC−5)	E. Valencia 79' (pen.)	Report	Flores 71'; Hurtado 75'	Stadium: Estadio Olímpico Atahualpa; Attendance: 30,000; Referee: Enrique Cáceres (PAR)

5 October 2018 FIFA World Cup qualification	Argentina	0–0	Peru	Buenos Aires
20:30 ART (UTC−3)		Report		Stadium: La Bombonera; Attendance: 49,000; Referee: Wilton Sampaio (BRA)

10 October 2018 FIFA World Cup qualification	Peru	1–1	Colombia	Lima
18:30 PET (UTC−5)	Ospina 77' (o.g.)	Report	Rodríguez 55'	Stadium: Estadio Nacional; Attendance: 29,637; Referee: Sandro Ricci (BRA)

11 November OFC–CONMEBOL qualification play-off	New Zealand	0–0	Peru	Wellington
16:15 NZST (UTC+13)		Report		Stadium: Westpac Stadium; Attendance: 37,034; Referee: Mark Geiger (USA)

15 November OFC–CONMEBOL qualification play-off	Peru	2–0 (2–0 agg.)	New Zealand	Lima
21:15 PET (UTC−5)	Farfán 28'; Ramos 65'	Report		Stadium: Estadio Nacional; Attendance: 39,125; Referee: Clément Turpin (FRA)

=== Peru national under-20 football team ===
==== South American U-20 Championship ====
===== First stage =====
Pos	Team	Pld	W	D	L	GF	GA	GD	Pts	Qualification
1	Uruguay	4	2	2	0	8	3	+5	8	Final stage
2	Argentina	4	1	3	0	9	5	+4	6	Final stage
3	Venezuela	4	0	4	0	1	1	0	4	Final stage
4	Bolivia	4	1	1	2	3	8	−5	4	
5	Peru	4	0	2	2	2	6	−4	2	

Source: CONMEBOL

19 January 2017	Argentina	1–1	Peru	Estadio Olímpico de Ibarra, Ibarra
19:15	La. Martínez 89'	Report	Siucho 11'	Referee: Carlos Orbe (Ecuador)

21 January 2017	Peru	0–2	Bolivia	Estadio Olímpico de Ibarra, Ibarra
17:00		Report	Monteiro 54'; Miranda 88'	Referee: Gustavo Murillo (Colombia)

23 January 2017	Peru	1–1	Venezuela	Estadio Olímpico de Ibarra, Ibarra
17:00	Siucho 55'	Report	Herrera 88'	Referee: Anderson Daronco (Brazil)

25 January 2017	Uruguay	2–0	Peru	Estadio Olímpico de Ibarra, Ibarra
19:15	Amaral 8' (pen.); Schiappacasse 63'	Report		Referee: Roberto Tobar (Chile)

=== Peru national under-17 football team ===
==== South American U-17 Championship ====
===== First stage =====
Pos	Team	Pld	W	D	L	GF	GA	GD	Pts	Qualification
1	Brazil	4	3	1	0	7	1	+6	10	Final stage
2	Paraguay	4	2	2	0	6	3	+3	8	Final stage
3	Venezuela	4	2	1	1	6	5	+1	7	Final stage
4	Argentina	4	1	0	3	3	4	−1	3	
5	Peru	4	0	0	4	2	11	−9	0	

Source: CONMEBOL

24 February 2017	Brazil	3–0	Peru	Estadio La Granja, Curicó
22:15	Vinícius Jr. 13'; Marcos Antônio 33'; Lincoln 45+2' (pen.)	Report		Referee: Juan Albarracín (Ecuador)

28 February 2017	Argentina	3–0	Peru	Estadio Fiscal, Talca
20:15	Colidio 35', 39'; Obando 57'	Report		Referee: Leodán González (Uruguay)

2 March 2017	Venezuela	3–2	Peru	Estadio Fiscal, Talca
17:00	Barragán 21'; Hurtado 30'; Makoun 77'	Report	Mifflin 24'; Sánchez 45+3'	Referee: Juan Nelio García (Bolivia)

4 March 2017	Paraguay	2–0	Peru	Estadio Fiscal, Talca
17:00	Rodríguez 20'; Fuentes 43' (o.g.)	Report		Referee: Juan Albarracín (Ecuador)

=== Peru national under-15 football team ===
==== South American U-15 Championship ====
===== Group stage =====
Pos	Team	Pld	W	D	L	GF	GA	GD	Pts	Qualification
1	Brazil	5	5	0	0	17	1	+16	15	Knockout stage
2	Peru	5	2	2	1	8	7	+1	8	Knockout stage
3	Ecuador	5	2	2	1	7	6	+1	8	
4	Venezuela	5	1	2	2	5	7	−2	5	
5	Bolivia	5	1	1	3	8	16	−8	4	
6	Croatia (G)	5	0	1	4	4	12	−8	1	

Source: CONMEBOL
Rules for classification: Group stage tiebreakers
(G) Guests

6 November 2017	Croatia	0–3	Peru	Estadio Malvinas Argentinas, Mendoza
18:45		Report	Ruiz 12', 80'; Cavero 28'	Referee: Fernando Espinoza (Argentina)

8 November 2017	Peru	4–1	Bolivia	Estadio Malvinas Argentinas, Mendoza
16:30	Cavero 18'; De la Cruz 38'; Ruiz 48'; Celi 63'	Report	Tomé de Araujo 20'	Referee: Arnaldo Samaniego (Paraguay)

10 November 2017	Peru	0–0	Venezuela	Estadio Malvinas Argentinas, Mendoza
18:45		Report		Referee: Esteban Ostojich (Uruguay)

12 November 2017	Ecuador	1–1	Peru	Estadio Víctor Antonio Legrotaglie, Mendoza
16:30	Acosta 31'	Report	Celi 67'	Referee: Arnaldo Samaniego (Paraguay)

14 November 2017	Brazil	5–0	Peru	Estadio Malvinas Argentinas, Mendoza
21:00	Diego Rosa 1'; Peglow 9'; Gabriel Silva 19', 47'; Pedro Arthur 24'	Report		Referee: Fernando Espinoza (Argentina)

== CONMEBOL competitions ==
=== CONMEBOL Libertadores ===
==== First stage ====
23 January 2017
19:15 UTC−5

Deportivo Municipal (Peru)	0–1	(Ecuador) Independiente del Valle
	Report	Estrada 9'

Estadio Nacional, Lima
Attendance: 15,000
Referee: Patricio Polic (Chile)
27 January 2017
19:15 UTC−5

Independiente del Valle (Ecuador)	2–2	(Peru) Deportivo Municipal
Estrada 62'; Cortez 90+3'	Report	Moreno 19'; Larrauri 75'

Estadio Rumiñahui, Sangolquí
Attendance: 5,000
Referee: Wilson Lamouroux (Colombia)

==== Second stage ====
2 February 2017
21:15 UTC−3

Deportivo Capiatá (Paraguay)	1–3	(Peru) Universitario
Gamarra 69'	Report	Gómez 14'; Rengifo 29'; Manicero 82'

Estadio Lic. Erico Galeano Segovia, Capiatá
Attendance: 12,000
Referee: Omar Ponce (Ecuador)
9 February 2017
19:15 UTC−5

Universitario (Peru)	0–3	(Paraguay) Deportivo Capiatá
	Report	Gamarra 13', 34'; Pérez 66'

Estadio Monumental, Lima
Attendance: 25,000
Referee: Mauro Vigliano (Argentina)

==== Group stage ====
Group 2

Pos	Team	Pld	W	D	L	GF	GA	GD	Pts	Qualification	SAN	STR	SFE	CRI
1	(Brazil) Santos	6	3	3	0	11	4	+7	12	Round of 16	—	2–0	3–2	4–0
2	(Bolivia) The Strongest	6	2	3	1	9	5	+4	9	Round of 16	1–1	—	2–0	5–1
3	(Colombia) Santa Fe	6	2	2	2	8	6	+2	8	Copa Sudamericana	0–0	1–1	—	3–0
4	(Peru) Sporting Cristal	6	0	2	4	2	15	−13	2		1–1	0–0	0–2	—

Source: CONMEBOL
9 March 2017
19:45 UTC−5

Sporting Cristal (Peru)	1–1	(Brazil) Santos
Cazulo 13'	Report	Thiago Maia 66'

Estadio Nacional, Lima
Attendance: 20,000
Referee: José Argote (Venezuela)
16 March 2017
19:45 UTC−5

Santa Fe (Colombia)	3–0	(Peru) Sporting Cristal
Arango 9'; Gómez 77', 90+1'	Report

Estadio El Campín, Bogotá
Attendance: 17,464
Referee: Carlos Orbe (Ecuador)
18 April 2017
19:45 UTC−5

Sporting Cristal (Peru)	0–0	(Bolivia) The Strongest
	Report

Estadio Nacional, Lima
Attendance: 10,000
Referee: Mario Díaz de Vivar (Paraguay)
4 May 2017
18:30 UTC−4

The Strongest (Bolivia)	5–1	(Peru) Sporting Cristal
Alonso 18' (pen.), 36'; Chumacero 30'; Martelli 61'; Veizaga 70'	Report	D. Bejarano 52' (o.g.)

Estadio Hernando Siles, La Paz
Attendance: 14,000
Referee: Mauro Vigliano (Argentina)
17 May 2017
17:30 UTC−5

Sporting Cristal (Peru)	0–2	(Colombia) Santa Fe
	Report	Arango 19'; Plata 90+1'

Estadio Nacional, Lima
Attendance: 5,000
Referee: Néstor Pitana (Argentina)
23 May 2017
21:45 UTC−3

Santos (Brazil)	4–0	(Peru) Sporting Cristal
David Braz 19', 71'; Ricardo Oliveira 22'; Vitor Bueno 66'	Report

Estádio Urbano Caldeira, Santos
Attendance: 6,632
Referee: José Méndez (Paraguay)

Group 3

Pos	Team	Pld	W	D	L	GF	GA	GD	Pts	Qualification	RIV	EME	DIM	MEL
1	(Argentina) River Plate	6	4	1	1	14	9	+5	13	Round of 16	—	1–1	1–2	4–2
2	(Ecuador) Emelec	6	3	1	2	8	5	+3	10	Round of 16	1–2	—	1–0	3–0
3	(Colombia) Independiente Medellín	6	3	0	3	8	8	0	9	Copa Sudamericana	1–3	1–2	—	2–0
4	(Peru) Melgar	6	1	0	5	6	14	−8	3		2–3	1–0	1–2	—

Source: CONMEBOL
14 March 2017
17:30 UTC−5

Melgar (Peru)	1–0	(Ecuador) Emelec
García 76'	Report

Estadio Monumental de la UNSA, Arequipa
Attendance: 15,000
Referee: Sandro Ricci (Brazil)
13 April 2017
21:00 UTC−3

River Plate (Argentina)	4–2	(Peru) Melgar
I. Fernández 17'; Driussi 21', 66'; Martínez Quarta 26'	Report	Herrera 4', 24'

Estadio Monumental Antonio Vespucio Liberti, Buenos Aires
Attendance: 35,000
Referee: Raúl Orosco (Bolivia)
20 April 2017
19:00 UTC−5

Independiente Medellín (Colombia)	2–0	(Peru) Melgar
Viola 12'; Mosquera 63'	Report

Estadio Atanasio Girardot, Medellín
Attendance: 23,508
Referee: Leodán González (Uruguay)
26 April 2017
19:00 UTC−5

Melgar (Peru)	1–2	(Colombia) Independiente Medellín
Herrera 69'	Report	Piedrahita 72'; Quintero 74'

Estadio Monumental de la UNSA, Arequipa
Attendance: 15,000
Referee: Anderson Daronco (Brazil)
18 May 2017
19:00 UTC−5

Melgar (Peru)	2–3	(Argentina) River Plate
O. Fernández 23'; Herrera 61'	Report	Alario 11'; Mayada 19'; I. Fernández 69'

Estadio Monumental de la UNSA, Arequipa
Attendance: 10,000
Referee: Jesús Valenzuela (Venezuela)
25 May 2017
17:30 UTC−5

Emelec (Ecuador)	3–0	(Peru) Melgar
Orejuela 27'; Quiñónez 49'; Angulo 78'	Report

Estadio George Capwell, Guayaquil
Attendance: 20,000
Referee: Leodán González (Uruguay)

=== CONMEBOL Sudamericana ===
==== First stage ====
1 March 2017
18:15 UTC−4

Nacional Potosí (Bolivia)	3–1	(Peru) Sport Huancayo
Ruiz 45+1'; Paniagua 76'; Alessandrini 82'	Report	Corrales 9'

Estadio Víctor Agustín Ugarte, Potosí
Attendance: 1,000
Referee: Carlos Orbe (Ecuador)
9 May 2017
17:15 UTC−5

Sport Huancayo (Peru)	2–1	(Bolivia) Nacional Potosí
Montes 52' (pen.); Montiel 77'	Report	Sanguinetti 37' (pen.)

Estadio Huancayo, Huancayo
Attendance: 5,000
Referee: Juan Albarracín (Ecuador)

4 April 2017
21:45 UTC−3

Independiente (Argentina)	0–0	(Peru) Alianza Lima
	Report

Estadio Libertadores de América, Avellaneda
Attendance: 23,000
Referee: Patricio Polic (Chile)
31 May 2017
19:45 UTC−5

Alianza Lima (Peru)	0–1	(Argentina) Independiente
	Report	Rigoni 30'

Estadio Alejandro Villanueva, Lima
Attendance: 27,500
Referee: Anderson Daronco (Brazil)

28 February 2017
19:15 UTC−3

Boston River (Uruguay)	3–1	(Peru) Comerciantes Unidos
Pereyra 8', 42'; Rodríguez 44' (o.g.)	Report	Palacio 1'

Estadio Gran Parque Central, Montevideo
Attendance: 1,000
Referee: Andrés Rojas (Colombia)
1 June 2017
17:15 UTC−5

Comerciantes Unidos (Peru)	1–1	(Uruguay) Boston River
Rosales 56' (pen.)	Report	Fratta 20'

Estadio Huancayo, Huancayo
Attendance: 3,000
Referee: Raúl Orosco (Bolivia)

2 March 2017
16:00 UTC−5

Juan Aurich (Peru)	0–2	(Argentina) Arsenal
	Report	Boghossian 6'; Wilchez 21'

Estadio Mansiche, Trujillo
Attendance: 2,000
Referee: Jesús Valenzuela (Venezuela)
11 May 2017
19:15 UTC−3

Arsenal (Argentina)	6–1	(Peru) Juan Aurich
Sánchez Sotelo 11', 44'; Bellocq 49'; Bottinelli 53'; Brunetta 70'; Corvalán 78'	Report	Borges 54'

Estadio Julio Humberto Grondona, Sarandí
Attendance: 3,000
Referee: Raúl Orosco (Bolivia)

== Men's football ==
=== Torneo Descentralizado ===
==== Torneo de Verano ====
Finals

May 21, 2017
16:00 PET
First Leg

Melgar	1–0	UTC
Omar Fernández 31'	report

Estadio Monumental de la UNSA, Arequipa
Attendance: 11,168
Referee: Miguel Santiváñez
May 31, 2017
14:30 PET
Second Leg

UTC	2–1	Melgar
Gustavo Dulanto 7'; Donald Millán 40'	report	Emanuel Herrera 90'
Penalties
Guerrero (penalty scored); Segura (penalty missed); Díaz (penalty scored); Dulanto (penalty scored); Millán (penalty missed)	3–4	(penalty missed) Fernández; (penalty scored) Barrientos; (penalty scored) Herrera; (penalty scored) Zuñiga; (penalty scored) Arce

Estadio Héroes de San Ramón, Cajamarca
Attendance: 10,242
Referee: Joel Alarcón

FBC Melgar won the cup after defeating UTC.

==== Torneo Apertura ====
Pos	Team	Pld	W	D	L	GF	GA	GD	Pts	Qualification
1	Alianza Lima	15	9	3	3	25	11	+14	30	Advance to Playoffs and qualification to Copa Libertadores group stage
2	Real Garcilaso	15	9	3	3	23	18	+5	30	
3	UTC	15	8	3	4	17	9	+8	27	
4	Sport Huancayo	15	7	5	3	23	16	+7	26	
5	Universitario	15	7	5	3	20	14	+6	26	
6	Deportivo Municipal	15	6	5	4	17	13	+4	23	
7	Sporting Cristal	15	6	5	4	22	20	+2	23	
8	Sport Rosario	15	5	6	4	16	18	−2	21	
9	Melgar	15	5	4	6	19	18	+1	19	
10	Universidad San Martín	15	5	4	6	25	26	−1	19	
11	Comerciantes Unidos	15	4	5	6	18	21	−3	17	
12	Unión Comercio	15	4	3	8	21	21	0	15	
13	Ayacucho	15	4	3	8	15	26	−11	15	
14	Alianza Atlético	15	3	3	9	13	22	−9	12	
15	Cantolao	15	2	5	8	12	20	−8	11	
16	Juan Aurich	15	1	8	6	14	27	−13	11	

Source: ADFP
Rules for classification: 1) points; 2) goal difference; 3) goals scored; 4) draw.

==== Torneo Clausura ====
Pos	Team	Pld	W	D	L	GF	GA	GD	Pts	Qualification
1	Alianza Lima	15	11	1	3	23	15	+8	34	Advance to Playoffs and qualification to Copa Libertadores group stage
2	Real Garcilaso	15	10	2	3	29	15	+14	32	
3	Melgar	15	9	4	2	30	12	+18	31	
4	Universitario (Note: Universitario was deducted 1 point for an outstanding debt.)	15	9	3	3	28	18	+10	29	
5	Deportivo Municipal	15	6	5	4	23	20	+3	23	
6	Sport Rosario	15	5	5	5	20	17	+3	20	
7	Sport Huancayo	15	5	5	5	22	22	0	20	
8	UTC	15	6	2	7	17	17	0	20	
9	Sporting Cristal	15	5	3	7	27	24	+3	18	
10	Juan Aurich	15	5	2	8	22	28	−6	17	
11	Cantolao (Note: Cantolao was deducted 1 point for an outstanding debt.)	15	4	6	5	13	22	−9	17	
12	Comerciantes Unidos	15	4	3	8	22	24	−2	15	
13	Ayacucho	15	3	5	7	18	26	−8	14	
14	Universidad San Martín	15	4	2	9	20	29	−9	14	
15	Unión Comercio	15	3	4	8	15	22	−7	13	
16	Alianza Atlético	15	3	4	8	13	31	−18	13	

Source: ADFP
Rules for classification: 1) points; 2) goal difference; 3) goals scored; 4) draw.

== Women's football ==
=== Copa Peru ===
Final

18 December 2017
Final

JC Sport Girls	7–1	CD Educación

JC Sport Girls won the cup after defeating CD Education.
