= 2020 U-20 Copa Libertadores =

South American under-20 club football tournament

Copa CONMEBOL Libertadores Sub-20 Paraguay 2020

Tournament details
- Host country: Paraguay
- Dates: 15 February – 1 March 2020
- Teams: 12 (from 10 associations)
- Venues: 2 (in 2 host cities)

Final positions
- Champions: (Ecuador) Independiente del Valle (1st title)
- Runners-up: (Argentina) River Plate
- Third place: (Brazil) Flamengo
- Fourth place: (Paraguay) Libertad

Tournament statistics
- Matches played: 22
- Goals scored: 81 (3.68 per match)
- Top scorer(s): (Paraguay) Derlis Aquino (6 goals)

The 2020 U-20 Copa CONMEBOL Libertadores (Spanish: Copa CONMEBOL Libertadores Sub-20 2020) was the 5th edition of the U-20 CONMEBOL Libertadores (also referred to as the U-20 Copa Libertadores), South America's premier under-20 club football tournament organized by CONMEBOL. The tournament was held in Paraguay from 15 February to 1 March 2020. Nacional were the defending champions, but failed to advance out of the group stage.

Independiente del Valle defeated River Plate in the final to claim their first title, while Flamengo beat Libertad to finish third.

== Teams ==
The competition was contested by 12 teams: the title holders, the youth champions from each of the ten CONMEBOL member associations, and one additional team from the host association.

Players must be born on or after 1 January 2000.

Association	Team	Qualifying method	Participation	Previous best result
Argentina	River Plate	2018–19 play-off winners between Cuarta División (U-20) Apertura and Clausura champions	3rd	Champions (2012)
Bolivia	Jorge Wilstermann	2019 U-19 Torneo Nacional champions	2nd	Group stage (2011)
Brazil	Flamengo	2019 U-20 Supercopa de Brasil champions	2nd	Quarterfinals (2011)
Chile	Colo-Colo	2019 U-19 Copa de Campeones champions	2nd	Group stage (2018)
Colombia	Millonarios	2019 U-20 Súper Copa Juvenil champions	2nd	Group stage (2011)
Ecuador	Independiente del Valle	2019 U-18 Serie A champions	5th	Runners-up (2018)
Paraguay (hosts)	Libertad	2019 U-19 Apertura champions	4th	Quarterfinals (2011)
Paraguay (hosts)	Cerro Porteño	2019 U-19 Clausura champions	3rd	Quarterfinals (2012)
Peru	Sporting Cristal	2019 Torneo de Promoción y Reserva champions	2nd	Group stage (2012)
Uruguay	Nacional	2018 U-20 Copa Libertadores champions	3rd	Champions (2018)
Uruguay	Danubio	2019 U-19 Campeonato Uruguayo champions	1st	—
Venezuela	Academia Puerto Cabello	2019 U-19 Serie Élite champions	1st	—

== Venues ==
The tournament was played at two venues in two cities, both in the Metropolitan Area of Asunción:

- Estadio Arsenio Erico, Asunción (home stadium of Club Nacional)
- Estadio General Adrián Jara, Luque (home stadium of General Díaz)

== Draw ==
The draw was held on 28 January 2020, 12:00 PYST (UTC−3), at the headquarters of the Paraguayan Football Association. The draw was conducted according to Regulations Article 16 as follows:

- The 12 teams were seeded into four pots of three teams, based on the final placement of their national association's club in the previous edition of the tournament, and drawn into three groups of four.
- The defending champions Nacional were automatically seeded into Pot 1 and allocated to position A1 in the group stage, while the teams from the next two best associations (Ecuador and Uruguay), were also seeded into Pot 1 and drawn to position B1 or C1 in the group stage.
- The teams from the next three associations (Brazil, Argentina and Paraguay) were seeded into Pot 2 and drawn to position A2, B2 or C2 in the group stage.
- The teams from the next three associations (Colombia, Venezuela and Chile) were seeded into Pot 3 and drawn to position A3, B3 or C3 in the group stage.
- The teams from the last two associations (Bolivia and Peru) and the additional team from the host association (Paraguay) were seeded into Pot 4 and drawn to position A4, B4 or C4 in the group stage.
- Teams from the same association could not be drawn into the same group.

Pot 1	Pot 2	Pot 3	Pot 4
(Uruguay) Nacional (Position A1); (Ecuador) Independiente del Valle; (Uruguay) Danubio	(Brazil) Flamengo; (Argentina) River Plate; (Paraguay) Libertad	(Colombia) Millonarios; (Venezuela) Academia Puerto Cabello; (Chile) Colo-Colo	(Bolivia) Jorge Wilstermann; (Peru) Sporting Cristal; (Paraguay) Cerro Porteño

Notes

1. ^{CHI} The identity of the team from Chile was not known at the time of the draw.

== Match officials ==
On 30 January 2020, CONMEBOL announced that the CONMEBOL Referee Commission had appointed 10 referees and 20 assistant referees for the tournament.

- (Argentina) Andrés Merlos
  - Assistants: Lucas Germanotta and Facundo Rodríguez
- (Bolivia) Jordy Alemán
  - Assistants: Roger Orellana and Carlos Tapia
- (Brazil) Rafael Traci
  - Assistants: Bruno Boschilia and Rafael da Silva Alves
- (Chile) Felipe González
  - Assistants: Raúl Orellana and José Retamal
- (Colombia) Bismarks Santiago and Carlos Betancur
  - Assistants: Wilmar Navarro and Jhon Gallego

- (Ecuador) Roberto Sánchez
  - Assistants: Juan Aguiar and Andrés Tola
- (Paraguay) Derlis López
  - Assistants: Roberto Cañete and José Cuevas
- (Peru) Miguel Santiváñez
  - Assistants: Víctor Ráez and Stephen Atoche
- (Uruguay) Christian Ferreyra
  - Assistants: Agustín Berisso and Santiago Fernández
- (Venezuela) Orlando Bracamonte
  - Assistants: Alberto Ponte and Franchezcoly Chacón

== Group stage ==
In the group stage, the teams were ranked according to points (3 points for a win, 1 point for a draw, 0 points for a loss). If tied on points, tiebreakers were applied in the following order (Regulations Article 20):

1. Goal difference;
2. Goals scored;
3. Head-to-head result in games between tied teams;
4. Red cards;
5. Yellow cards;
6. Drawing of lots.

The winners of each group and the best runner-up among all groups advanced to the semi-finals.

All times local, PYST (UTC−3).

=== Group A ===
Pos	Team	Pld	W	D	L	GF	GA	GD	Pts	Qualification
1	(Brazil) Flamengo	3	2	0	1	8	3	+5	6	Semi-finals
2	(Venezuela) Academia Puerto Cabello	3	2	0	1	7	6	+1	6	
3	(Uruguay) Nacional	3	1	0	2	5	6	−1	3	
4	(Peru) Sporting Cristal	3	1	0	2	6	11	−5	3	

Source: CONMEBOL
15 February 2020
18:00

Nacional (Uruguay)	1–3	(Brazil) Flamengo
Sosa 51'	Report	Muniz 8', 53'; Yuri César 87'

Estadio General Adrián Jara, Luque
Referee: Jordy Alemán (Bolivia)
15 February 2020
20:15

Academia Puerto Cabello (Venezuela)	5–3	(Peru) Sporting Cristal
Arape 5', 59'; Hernández 23', 43', 89'	Report	Villalta 18'; Ruiz 21'; Romani 63'

Estadio General Adrián Jara, Luque
Referee: Bismarks Santiago (Colombia)

18 February 2020
18:00

Nacional (Uruguay)	3–1	(Venezuela) Academia Puerto Cabello
Tejera 11'; Barcos 45+3'; L. Pérez 67'	Report	Quevedo 14'

Estadio General Adrián Jara, Luque
Referee: Derlis López (Paraguay)
18 February 2020
20:15

Flamengo (Brazil)	5–1	(Peru) Sporting Cristal
Yuri César 40', 45+3'; Muniz 49' (pen.); Yuri 60'; João Gomes 85'	Report	Romani 36' (pen.)

Estadio General Adrián Jara, Luque
Referee: Felipe González (Chile)

21 February 2020
18:00

Sporting Cristal (Peru)	2–1	(Uruguay) Nacional
Romani 5' (pen.); Soto 22'	Report	A. Pérez 61'

Estadio Arsenio Erico, Asunción
Referee: Andrés Merlos (Argentina)
21 February 2020
20:15

Flamengo (Brazil)	0–1	(Venezuela) Academia Puerto Cabello
	Report	Linares 18'

Estadio Arsenio Erico, Asunción
Referee: Roberto Sánchez (Ecuador)

=== Group B ===
Pos	Team	Pld	W	D	L	GF	GA	GD	Pts	Qualification
1	(Argentina) River Plate	3	3	0	0	5	1	+4	9	Semi-finals
2	(Paraguay) Cerro Porteño (H)	3	1	1	1	3	3	0	4	
3	(Colombia) Millonarios	3	0	2	1	3	4	−1	2	
4	(Uruguay) Danubio	3	0	1	2	2	5	−3	1	

Source: CONMEBOL
(H) Hosts
16 February 2020
18:00

Danubio (Uruguay)	1–3	(Argentina) River Plate
Zapirain 45+1'	Report	Benítez 9'; Beltrán 56'; Galván 75'

Estadio Arsenio Erico, Asunción
Referee: Rafael Traci (Brazil)
16 February 2020
20:15

Millonarios (Colombia)	2–2	(Paraguay) Cerro Porteño
Brochero 48'; Moreno 90+4'	Report	Bobadilla 5'; López 68'

Estadio Arsenio Erico, Asunción
Referee: Orlando Bracamonte (Venezuela)

19 February 2020
18:00

Danubio (Uruguay)	1–1	(Colombia) Millonarios
Fernández 82'	Report	Brochero 49'

Estadio Arsenio Erico, Asunción
Referee: Miguel Santiváñez (Peru)
19 February 2020
20:15

River Plate (Argentina)	1–0	(Paraguay) Cerro Porteño
Gondou 65'	Report

Estadio Arsenio Erico, Asunción
Referee: Roberto Sánchez (Ecuador)

22 February 2020
18:00

Cerro Porteño (Paraguay)	1–0	(Uruguay) Danubio
Ovelar 25'	Report

Estadio General Adrián Jara, Luque
Referee: Jordy Alemán (Bolivia)
22 February 2020
20:15

River Plate (Argentina)	1–0	(Colombia) Millonarios
Castro 45'	Report

Estadio General Adrián Jara, Luque
Referee: Felipe González (Chile)

=== Group C ===
Pos	Team	Pld	W	D	L	GF	GA	GD	Pts	Qualification
1	(Ecuador) Independiente del Valle	3	3	0	0	8	1	+7	9	Semi-finals
2	(Paraguay) Libertad (H)	3	2	0	1	11	3	+8	6	Semi-finals
3	(Chile) Colo-Colo	3	1	0	2	3	2	+1	3	
4	(Bolivia) Jorge Wilstermann	3	0	0	3	1	17	−16	0	

Source: CONMEBOL
(H) Hosts
17 February 2020
18:00

Independiente del Valle (Ecuador)	2–1	(Paraguay) Libertad
García 22'; Ortíz 54'	Report	Aquino 82'

Estadio Arsenio Erico, Asunción
Referee: Christian Ferreyra (Uruguay)
17 February 2020
20:15

Colo-Colo (Chile)	3–0	(Bolivia) Jorge Wilstermann
Colossi 24'; Arriagada 40'; Rojas 67'	Report

Estadio Arsenio Erico, Asunción
Referee: Miguel Santiváñez (Peru)

20 February 2020
18:00

Independiente del Valle (Ecuador)	1–0	(Chile) Colo-Colo
Valencia 75'	Report

Estadio General Adrián Jara, Luque
Referee: Andrés Merlos (Argentina)
20 February 2020
20:15

Libertad (Paraguay)	9–1	(Bolivia) Jorge Wilstermann
Aquino 35', 38', 84'; Salinas 45+1'; Quiñonez 62'; Ferreira 70'; Bogado 73' (pen.); Fernández 80', 90'	Report	Díaz 44'

Estadio General Adrián Jara, Luque
Referee: Carlos Betancur (Colombia)

23 February 2020
18:00

Jorge Wilstermann (Bolivia)	0–5	(Ecuador) Independiente del Valle
	Report	Acosta 20'; Mejía 43'; Leiton 61'; Angulo 77'; Valencia 79'

Estadio Arsenio Erico, Asunción
Referee: Orlando Bracamonte (Venezuela)
23 February 2020
20:15

Libertad (Paraguay)	1–0	(Chile) Colo-Colo
Fernández 73'	Report

Estadio Arsenio Erico, Asunción
Referee: Bruno Arleu (Brazil)

=== Ranking of group runners-up ===
Pos	Grp	Team	Pld	W	D	L	GF	GA	GD	Pts	Qualification
1	C	(Paraguay) Libertad (H)	3	2	0	1	11	3	+8	6	Semi-finals
2	A	(Venezuela) Academia Puerto Cabello	3	2	0	1	7	6	+1	6	
3	B	(Paraguay) Cerro Porteño (H)	3	1	1	1	3	3	0	4	

Source: CONMEBOL
Rules for classification: 1) Points; 2) Goal difference; 3) Goals scored; 4) Red cards; 5) Yellow cards; 6) Drawing of lots (Regulations Article 21).
(H) Hosts

== Knockout stage ==
The semi-final matchups were:

- Group A winners vs. Group C winners
- Group B winners vs. Best runners-up

The semi-final winners and losers played in the final and third place match respectively. If tied after full-time, extra time would not be played, and a penalty shoot-out would be used to determine the winner (Regulations Article 22).

=== Bracket ===
Semi-finals
27 February – Asunción
(Brazil) Flamengo	1 (4)
(Ecuador) Independiente del Valle (p)	1 (5)
27 February – Asunción
(Argentina) River Plate	6
(Paraguay) Libertad	1

Final
1 March – Luque
(Ecuador) Independiente del Valle	2
(Argentina) River Plate	1
Third place
1 March – Luque
(Brazil) Flamengo	5
(Paraguay) Libertad	2

=== Semi-finals ===
27 February 2020
18:00

Flamengo (Brazil)	1–1	(Ecuador) Independiente del Valle
Guilherme Bala 72'	Report	Caicedo 90'
Penalties
Wendel (penalty scored); Yuri César (penalty scored); Natan (penalty scored); Matheuzinho (penalty missed); João Gomes (penalty scored)	4–5	(penalty scored) Caicedo; (penalty scored) Hincapié; (penalty scored) Acosta; (penalty scored) Mejía; (penalty scored) Ortíz

Estadio Arsenio Erico, Asunción
Referee: Felipe González (Chile)

27 February 2020
20:15

River Plate (Argentina)	6–1	(Paraguay) Libertad
Benítez 16', 49'; López 35'; Beltrán 81' (pen.); Castro 88'; Fernández 90'	Report	Aquino 65' (pen.)

Estadio Arsenio Erico, Asunción
Referee: Jordy Alemán (Bolivia)

=== Third place match ===
1 March 2020
18:00

Flamengo (Brazil)	5–2	(Paraguay) Libertad
João Gomes 32'; Muniz 37'; Yuri César 53', 78'; Wendel 67'	Report	Fernández 41'; Aquino 81'

Estadio General Adrián Jara, Luque
Referee: Miguel Santiváñez (Peru)

=== Final ===
1 March 2020
20:15

Independiente del Valle (Ecuador)	2–1	(Argentina) River Plate
Bravo 45+2'; Leiton 71'	Report	Benítez 63' (pen.)

Estadio General Adrián Jara, Luque
Referee: Christian Ferreyra (Uruguay)
