= Andrés Arroyo =

Andrés Arroyo may refer to:

- Andrés Arroyo (athlete) (born 1995), Puerto Rican athlete
- Andrés Arroyo (footballer) (born 2002), Colombian footballer
