= Tomás Castro =

Tomás Castro may refer to:

- Tomás Castro (footballer) (born 1999), Portuguese professional footballer
- Tomás Castro Ponce (born 2001), Argentine professional footballer
