= 2017 South American U-20 Championship =

2017 South American Youth Football Championship
Campeonato Sudamericano Sub-20 “Juventud de America” Ecuador 2017

Tournament details
- Host country: Ecuador
- Dates: 18 January – 11 February
- Teams: 10 (from 1 confederation)
- Venue: 4 (in 4 host cities)

Final positions
- Champions: Uruguay (8th title)
- Runners-up: Ecuador
- Third place: Venezuela
- Fourth place: Argentina

Tournament statistics
- Matches played: 35
- Goals scored: 91 (2.6 per match)
- Top scorer(s): (Uruguay) Rodrigo Amaral (Ecuador) Bryan Cabezas (Argentina) Lautaro Martínez (Argentina) Marcelo Torres (5 goals each)

The 2017 South American Youth Football Championship (Spanish: Campeonato Sudamericano Sub-20 Juventud de América Ecuador 2017, Brazilian Portuguese: Campeonato Sul-Americano Sub-20 Juventude da América Equador 2017) was the 28th edition of the South American Youth Football Championship, a football competition for the under-20 national teams in South America organized by CONMEBOL. It was held in Ecuador from 18 January to 11 February 2017.

Uruguay were crowned champions, and together with Ecuador, Venezuela and Argentina, which were the top four teams of this tournament, qualified for the 2017 FIFA U-20 World Cup in South Korea.

== Teams ==
All ten CONMEBOL member national teams entered the tournament.

| Team | Appearance | Previous best performance |
|---|---|---|
| Argentina (holders) | 26th | Champions (5 times, most recent 2015) |
| Bolivia | 23rd | Fourth place (2 times, most recent 1983) |
| Brazil | 27th | Champions (11 times, most recent 2011) |
| Chile | 28th | Runners-up (1 time, 1975) |
| Colombia | 26th | Champions (3 times, most recent 2013) |
| Ecuador (hosts) | 23rd | Third place (3 times, most recent 2011) |
| Paraguay | 26th | Champions (1 time, 1971) |
| Peru | 27th | Third place (2 times, most recent 1971) |
| Uruguay | 27th | Champions (7 times, most recent 1981) |
| Venezuela | 24th | Third place (1 time, most recent 1954) |

== Squads ==
Each team may register a squad of 23 players (three of whom must be goalkeepers).

== Venues ==
A total of eight venues in seven cities were proposed by FEF in July 2016, days later Latacunga was added as a possible venue. Tulcán was also nominated, but was finally dismissed along with Cuenca, Machala and Portoviejo. Eventually, five venues were confirmed to host the matches, Estadio Bellavista in Ambato, Estadio Olímpico de Riobamba in Riobamba and Estadio La Cocha in Latacunga for the Group A; Estadio Olímpico de Ibarra in Ibarra for the Group B while the final stage took place at Estadio Olímpico Atahualpa in Quito. However, on 5 January 2017, Estadio La Cocha in Latacunga was dropped as refurbishment work was not completed in time.

| Ambato | Ibarra | Quito | Riobamba |
|---|---|---|---|
| Estadio Bellavista | Estadio Olímpico de Ibarra | Estadio Olímpico Atahualpa | Estadio Olímpico de Riobamba |
| 1.244610°S 78.623205°W | 0.359607°N 78.118313°W | 0.177508°S 78.476683°W | 1.666265°S 78.660430°W |
| Capacity:16,467 | Capacity:17,260 | Capacity:35,258 | Capacity:14,400 |

== Match officials ==
The referees were:

(Argentina) Darío Herrera

Assistants: Diego Bonfá and Cristian Navarro

(Bolivia) Gery Vargas

Assistants: Juan Pablo Montaño and José Antelo

(Brazil) Anderson Daronco

Assistants: Rodrigo Correa and Guilherme Dias Camilo

(Chile) Roberto Tobar

Assistants: Raúl Orellana and José Retamal

(Colombia) Gustavo Murillo

Assistants: Humberto Clavijo and John Alexander León

(Ecuador) Carlos Orbe

Assistants: Juan Carlos Macías and Flavio Nall

(Paraguay) Mario Díaz de Vivar

Assistants: Milcíades Saldívar and Darío Gaona

(Peru) Diego Haro

Assistants: Raúl López Cruz and Víctor Ráez

(Uruguay) Jonhatan Fuentes

Assistants: Richard Trinidad and Gabriel Popovits

(Venezuela) Jesús Valenzuela

Assistants: Jorge Urrego and Franchescoly Chacón

== Draw ==
Originally, the draw was scheduled for 30 November 2016 in Montevideo but had to be postponed due to crash of LaMia Flight 2933 that occurred on 28 November 2016. It was rescheduled to be held on 7 December 2016, 11:00 PYT (UTC−3), at the CONMEBOL headquarters in Luque, Paraguay. The ten teams were drawn into two groups of five. Ecuador (hosts) and Argentina (title holders) were seeded into Group A and Group B respectively and assigned to position 1 in their group, while the remaining teams were placed into four "pairing pots" according to their results in the 2015 South American U-20 Championship (shown in brackets).

| Seeded | Pot 1 | Pot 2 | Pot 3 | Pot 4 |
|---|---|---|---|---|
| Ecuador (7) (Hosts, assigned to A1); Argentina (1) (Title holders, assigned to B1) | Colombia (2); Uruguay (3) | Brazil (4); Peru (5) | Paraguay (6); Venezuela (8) | Chile (9); Bolivia (10) |

== First stage ==
The top three teams in each group advanced to the final stage.

Tiebreakers

When teams finished level of points, the final rankings were determined according to:

1. goal difference
2. goals scored
3. head-to-head result between tied teams (two teams only)
4. drawing of lots

All times local, ECT (UTC−5).

=== Group A ===
| Pos | Team | Pld | W | D | L | GF | GA | GD | Pts | Qualification |
|---|---|---|---|---|---|---|---|---|---|---|
| 1 | Ecuador (H) | 4 | 2 | 1 | 1 | 7 | 6 | +1 | 7 | Final stage |
| 2 | Colombia | 4 | 2 | 1 | 1 | 6 | 5 | +1 | 7 | Final stage |
| 3 | Brazil | 4 | 2 | 1 | 1 | 4 | 3 | +1 | 7 | Final stage |
| 4 | Paraguay | 4 | 1 | 1 | 2 | 6 | 7 | −1 | 4 | |
| 5 | Chile | 4 | 0 | 2 | 2 | 2 | 4 | −2 | 2 | |

Source: CONMEBOL
(H) Hosts
18 January 2017
17:00

| Colombia | 1–1 | Paraguay |
|---|---|---|
| Ceter 88' | Report | S. Ferreira 80' |

Estadio Olímpico de Riobamba, Riobamba
Referee: Diego Haro (Peru)
18 January 2017
19:15

| Ecuador | 0–1 | Brazil |
|---|---|---|
| | Report | Felipe Vizeu 51' |

Estadio Olímpico de Riobamba, Riobamba
Referee: Jonhatan Fuentes (Uruguay)

20 January 2017
17:00

| Brazil | 0–0 | Chile |
|---|---|---|
| | Report |

Estadio Olímpico de Riobamba, Riobamba
Referee: Jesús Valenzuela (Venezuela)
20 January 2017
19:15

| Ecuador | 4–3 | Colombia |
|---|---|---|
| Estupiñán 40'; Quintero 51'; Cabezas 55' (pen.); Caicedo 90+1' | Report | Ceter 6'; Obregón 37'; Valencia 73' |

Estadio Olímpico de Riobamba, Riobamba
Referee: Darío Herrera (Argentina)

22 January 2017
14:45

| Brazil | 3–2 | Paraguay |
|---|---|---|
| Matheus Sávio 38'; Richarlison 56'; Felipe Vizeu 64' | Report | Medina 79' (pen.), 90' |

Estadio Bellavista, Ambato
Referee: Darío Herrera (Argentina)
22 January 2017
16:45

| Ecuador | 1–1 | Chile |
|---|---|---|
| Sierra 6' | Report | Sierra 79' |

Estadio Bellavista, Ambato
Referee: Diego Haro (Peru)

24 January 2017
17:00

| Paraguay | 2–1 | Chile |
|---|---|---|
| Báez 32'; Paredes 90' | Report | Jara 81' |

Estadio Olímpico de Riobamba, Riobamba
Referee: Jonhatan Fuentes (Uruguay)
24 January 2017
19:15

| Colombia | 1–0 | Brazil |
|---|---|---|
| Valencia 86' | Report |

Estadio Olímpico de Riobamba, Riobamba
Referee: Gery Vargas (Bolivia)

26 January 2017
17:00

| Colombia | 1–0 | Chile |
|---|---|---|
| Valencia 4' | Report |

Estadio Olímpico de Riobamba, Riobamba
Referee: Jesús Valenzuela (Venezuela)
26 January 2017
19:15

| Ecuador | 2–1 | Paraguay |
|---|---|---|
| Corozo 19'; Lino 21' | Report | Báez 46' |

Estadio Olímpico de Riobamba, Riobamba
Referee: Dario Herrera (Argentina)

=== Group B ===
| Pos | Team | Pld | W | D | L | GF | GA | GD | Pts | Qualification |
|---|---|---|---|---|---|---|---|---|---|---|
| 1 | Uruguay | 4 | 2 | 2 | 0 | 8 | 3 | +5 | 8 | Final stage |
| 2 | Argentina | 4 | 1 | 3 | 0 | 9 | 5 | +4 | 6 | Final stage |
| 3 | Venezuela | 4 | 0 | 4 | 0 | 1 | 1 | 0 | 4 | Final stage |
| 4 | Bolivia | 4 | 1 | 1 | 2 | 3 | 8 | −5 | 4 | |
| 5 | Peru | 4 | 0 | 2 | 2 | 2 | 6 | −4 | 2 | |

Source: CONMEBOL
19 January 2017
17:00

| Uruguay | 0–0 | Venezuela |
|---|---|---|
| | Report |

Estadio Olímpico de Ibarra, Ibarra
Referee: Roberto Tobar (Chile)
19 January 2017
19:15

| Argentina | 1–1 | Peru |
|---|---|---|
| La. Martínez 89' | Report | Siucho 11' |

Estadio Olímpico de Ibarra, Ibarra
Referee: Carlos Orbe (Ecuador)

21 January 2017
17:00

| Peru | 0–2 | Bolivia |
|---|---|---|
| | Report | Monteiro 54'; Miranda 88' |

Estadio Olímpico de Ibarra, Ibarra
Referee: Gustavo Murillo (Colombia)
21 January 2017
19:15

| Argentina | 3–3 | Uruguay |
|---|---|---|
| Torres 23', 73'; Rogel 88' (o.g.) | Report | Amaral 3'; De la Cruz 45+2' (pen.); Schiappacasse 81' |

Estadio Olímpico de Ibarra, Ibarra
Referee: Anderson Daronco (Brazil)

23 January 2017
17:00

| Peru | 1–1 | Venezuela |
|---|---|---|
| Siucho 55' | Report | Herrera 88' |

Estadio Olímpico de Ibarra, Ibarra
Referee: Anderson Daronco (Brazil)
23 January 2017
19:15

| Argentina | 5–1 | Bolivia |
|---|---|---|
| Torres 22', 42'; Mansilla 35'; Conechny 54'; Rodríguez 68' | Report | R. Vaca 70' |

Estadio Olímpico de Ibarra, Ibarra
Referee: Mario Díaz de Vivar (Paraguay)

25 January 2017
17:00

| Venezuela | 0–0 | Bolivia |
|---|---|---|
| | Report |

Estadio Olímpico de Ibarra, Ibarra
Referee: Carlos Orbe (Ecuador)
25 January 2017
19:15

| Uruguay | 2–0 | Peru |
|---|---|---|
| Amaral 8' (pen.); Schiappacasse 63' | Report |

Estadio Olímpico de Ibarra, Ibarra
Referee: Roberto Tobar (Chile)

27 January 2017
17:00

| Uruguay | 3–0 | Bolivia |
|---|---|---|
| Rogel 17'; Bentancur 43'; Amaral 82' | Report |

Estadio Olímpico de Ibarra, Ibarra
Referee: Gustavo Murillo (Colombia)
27 January 2017
19:15

| Argentina | 0–0 | Venezuela |
|---|---|---|
| | Report |

Estadio Olímpico de Ibarra, Ibarra
Referee: Mario Díaz de Vivar (Paraguay)

== Final stage ==
When teams finished level of points, the final rankings were determined according to the same criteria as the first stage, taking into account only matches in the final stage.

| Pos | Team | Pld | W | D | L | GF | GA | GD | Pts | Qualification |
|---|---|---|---|---|---|---|---|---|---|---|
| 1 | Uruguay | 5 | 4 | 0 | 1 | 10 | 5 | +5 | 12 | 2017 FIFA U-20 World Cup |
| 2 | Ecuador (H) | 5 | 2 | 1 | 2 | 11 | 8 | +3 | 7 | 2017 FIFA U-20 World Cup |
| 3 | Venezuela | 5 | 2 | 1 | 2 | 8 | 6 | +2 | 7 | 2017 FIFA U-20 World Cup |
| 4 | Argentina | 5 | 2 | 1 | 2 | 6 | 9 | −3 | 7 | 2017 FIFA U-20 World Cup |
| 5 | Brazil | 5 | 1 | 3 | 1 | 6 | 6 | 0 | 6 | |
| 6 | Colombia | 5 | 0 | 2 | 3 | 2 | 9 | −7 | 2 | |

Source: CONMEBOL
(H) Hosts
30 January 2017
16:00

| Colombia | 1–1 | Venezuela |
|---|---|---|
| Hernández 85' (pen.) | Report | Soteldo 35' |

Estadio Olímpico Atahualpa, Quito
Referee: Jonhatan Fuentes (Uruguay)
30 January 2017
18:15

| Uruguay | 3–0 | Argentina |
|---|---|---|
| De la Cruz 37'; Olivera 40'; Amaral 61' | Report |

Estadio Olímpico Atahualpa, Quito
Referee: Diego Haro (Peru)
30 January 2017
20:30

| Ecuador | 2–2 | Brazil |
|---|---|---|
| Jaramillo 69' (pen.); Estupiñán 77' (pen.) | Report | Guilherme Arana 14'; Maycon 24' |

Estadio Olímpico Atahualpa, Quito
Referee: Mario Díaz de Vivar (Paraguay)

2 February 2017
16:00

| Colombia | 1–2 | Argentina |
|---|---|---|
| Hernández 56' | Report | Torres 1'; La. Martínez 90' |

Estadio Olímpico Atahualpa, Quito
Referee: Anderson Daronco (Brazil)
2 February 2017
18:15

| Uruguay | 2–1 | Brazil |
|---|---|---|
| Amaral 59'; Viña 90+1' | Report | Guilherme Arana 23' |

Estadio Olímpico Atahualpa, Quito
Referee: Darío Herrera (Argentina)
2 February 2017
20:30

| Ecuador | 2–4 | Venezuela |
|---|---|---|
| Estupiñán 87' (pen.); Cabezas 90+7' (pen.) | Report | Herrera 39'; Soteldo 52' (pen.); Chacón 55'; Córdova 63' |

Estadio Olímpico Atahualpa, Quito
Referee: Roberto Tobar (Chile)

5 February 2017
16:00

| Brazil | 1–0 | Venezuela |
|---|---|---|
| Felipe Vizeu 88' | Report |

Estadio Olímpico Atahualpa, Quito
Referee: Diego Haro (Peru)
5 February 2017
18:15

| Uruguay | 3–0 | Colombia |
|---|---|---|
| Waller 40'; Schiappacasse 64'; De la Cruz 82' (pen.) | Report |

Estadio Olímpico Atahualpa, Quito
Referee: Mario Díaz de Vivar (Paraguay)
5 February 2017
20:30

| Ecuador | 3–0 | Argentina |
|---|---|---|
| Estupiñán 39' (pen.); Caicedo 57'; Cabezas 62' | Report |

Estadio Olímpico Atahualpa, Quito
Referee: Gery Vargas (Bolivia)

8 February 2017
16:00

| Ecuador | 3–0 | Colombia |
|---|---|---|
| Cabezas 49', 82'; Caicedo 62' | Report |

Estadio Olímpico Atahualpa, Quito
Referee: Darío Herrera (Argentina)
8 February 2017
18:15

| Uruguay | 0–3 | Venezuela |
|---|---|---|
| | Report | Mejías 67'; Soteldo 70' (pen.); Chacón 75' (pen.) |

Estadio Olímpico Atahualpa, Quito
Referee: Gery Vargas (Bolivia)
8 February 2017
20:30

| Brazil | 2–2 | Argentina |
|---|---|---|
| Richarlison 9'; Felipe Vizeu 65' (pen.) | Report | Mansilla 25'; La. Martínez 90+4' |

Estadio Olímpico Atahualpa, Quito
Referee: Roberto Tobar (Chile)

11 February 2017
15:30

| Argentina | 2–0 | Venezuela |
|---|---|---|
| La. Martínez 42', 45' | Report |

Estadio Olímpico Atahualpa, Quito
Referee: Mario Díaz de Vivar (Paraguay)
11 February 2017
17:45

| Colombia | 0–0 | Brazil |
|---|---|---|
| | Report |

Estadio Olímpico Atahualpa, Quito
Referee: Gery Vargas (Bolivia)
11 February 2017
20:00

| Ecuador | 1–2 | Uruguay |
|---|---|---|
| Lino 65' | Report | Ardaiz 4', 25' |

Estadio Olímpico Atahualpa, Quito
Referee: Roberto Tobar (Chile)

== Winners ==
2017 South American Youth Football champions

Uruguay
8th title

== Goalscorers ==
5 goals

- (Argentina) Lautaro Martínez
- (Argentina) Marcelo Torres
- (Ecuador) Bryan Cabezas
- (Uruguay) Rodrigo Amaral

4 goals

- (Brazil) Felipe Vizeu
- (Ecuador) Pervis Estupiñán

3 goals

- (Colombia) Éver Valencia
- (Ecuador) Jordy Caicedo
- (Uruguay) Nicolás de la Cruz
- (Uruguay) Nicolás Schiappacasse
- (Venezuela) Yeferson Soteldo

2 goals

- (Argentina) Brian Mansilla
- (Brazil) Guilherme Arana
- (Brazil) Richarlison
- (Colombia) Damir Ceter
- (Colombia) Juan Camilo Hernández
- (Ecuador) Herlin Lino
- (Paraguay) Pedro Báez
- (Paraguay) Jesús Medina
- (Peru) Roberto Siucho
- (Uruguay) Joaquín Ardaiz
- (Venezuela) Ronaldo Chacón
- (Venezuela) Yangel Herrera

1 goal

- (Argentina) Tomás Conechny
- (Argentina) Lucas Rodríguez
- (Bolivia) Bruno Miranda
- (Bolivia) Ronaldo Monteiro
- (Bolivia) Ramiro Vaca
- (Brazil) Matheus Sávio
- (Brazil) Maycon
- (Chile) Ignacio Jara
- (Chile) José Luis Sierra
- (Colombia) Jorge Obregón
- (Ecuador) Washington Corozo
- (Ecuador) Renny Jaramillo
- (Ecuador) Joel Quintero
- (Ecuador) Jordan Sierra
- (Paraguay) Sebastián Ferreira
- (Paraguay) Cristhian Paredes
- (Uruguay) Rodrigo Bentancur
- (Uruguay) Mathías Olivera
- (Uruguay) Agustín Rogel
- (Uruguay) Matías Viña
- (Uruguay) Facundo Waller
- (Venezuela) Sergio Córdova
- (Venezuela) Josua Mejías

Own goal

- (Uruguay) Agustín Rogel (playing against Argentina)

Source: CONMEBOL.com

== Qualified teams for FIFA U-20 World Cup ==
The following four teams from CONMEBOL qualified for the 2017 FIFA U-20 World Cup.

| Team | Qualified on | Previous appearances in tournament^{1} |
|---|---|---|
| Uruguay | 5 February 2017 | 13 (1977, 1979, 1981, 1983, 1991, 1993, 1997, 1999, 2007, 2009, 2011, 2013, 2015) |
| Ecuador | 11 February 2017 | 2 (2001, 2011) |
| Venezuela | 11 February 2017 | 1 (2009) |
| Argentina | 11 February 2017 | 14 (**1979**, 1981, 1983, 1989, 1991, **1995**, **1997**, 1999, **2001**, 2003, **2005**, **2007**, 2011, 2015) |

^{1} Bold indicates champion for that year. Italic indicates host for that year.
