= Federico Versaci =

Argentine footballer (born 2002)

Personal information
- Date of birth: 16 February 2002 (age 24)
- Place of birth: Buenos Aires, Argentina
- Height: 1.70 m (5 ft 7 in)
- Position: Right winger

Team information
- Current team: Tristán Suárez (on loan from Defensa y Justicia)

Youth career
- Vélez Sarsfield

Senior career*
Years	Team	Apps	(Gls)
2020–2022	Vélez Sarsfield	2	(0)
2022–	Defensa y Justicia	5	(0)
2024–	→ Tristán Suárez (loan)	37	(1)

International career
2017	Argentina U15		
2018–2019	Argentina U17		
- * Club domestic league appearances and goals as of 17:48, 22 August 2025 (UTC)

Federico Versaci (born 16 February 2002) is an Argentine professional footballer who plays as a right winger for Tristán Suárez, on loan from Defensa y Justicia.

== Club career ==
Versaci joined the Vélez Sarsfield academy at the age of five. He remained there for the entirety of his youth career, eventually making the move into senior football towards the end of 2020 under manager Mauricio Pellegrino. In November, he made the substitute's bench for a Copa Sudamericana win over Deportivo Cali and a Copa de la Liga Profesional defeat to Gimnasia y Esgrima; both at home. Versaci's professional debut soon arrived on 5 December in a fixture away to Patronato in the latter competition, as the player replaced Mauro Pittón with ten minutes remaining of a goalless draw.

On 8 July 2022, Versaci moved to Defensa y Justicia.

== International career ==
Versaci represented Argentina at the 2017 South American U-15 Championship on home soil. He scored once, a penalty against Colombia, as they won the trophy. In March 2018, Versaci received a call-up from the U17s for a friendly with Huracán. He played in the match, though departed prematurely after suffering a ligament injury; which kept him out of action for almost a year. Further U17 calls arrived in 2019.

== Career statistics ==
As of 23 March 2021.

Appearances and goals by club, season and competition
Club	Season	League			Cup		League Cup		Continental		Other		Total	
Club	Season	Division	Apps	Goals	Apps	Goals	Apps	Goals	Apps	Goals	Apps	Goals	Apps	Goals
Vélez Sarsfield	2020–21 (Note: Soccerway counts 2020 Copa de la Liga Profesional appearances as league appearances.)	Primera División	2	0	0	0	0	0	0	0	0	0	2	0
Vélez Sarsfield	2021 (Note: Soccerway counts 2021 Copa de la Liga Profesional appearances as league appearances.)	Primera División	0	0	1	0	0	0	0	0	0	0	1	0
Career total			2	0	1	0	0	0	0	0	0	0	3	0

== Honours ==
Argentina U15

- South American U-15 Championship: 2017
