= Nicolás Schiappacasse =

Uruguayan footballer (born 1999)

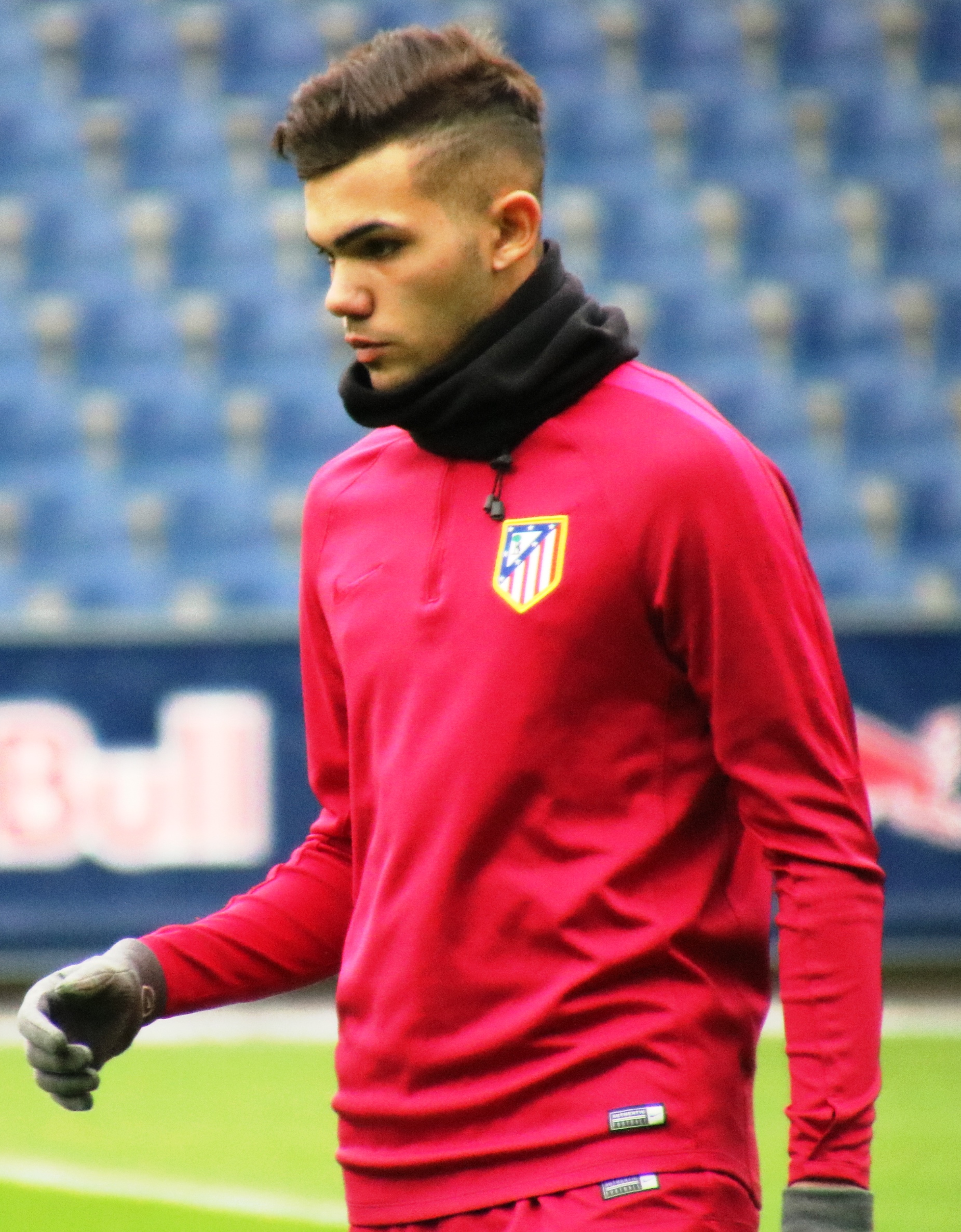
- Schiappacasse with Atlético Madrid in 2017

Personal information
- Full name: Nicolás Javier Schiappacasse Oliva
- Date of birth: 12 January 1999 (age 27)
- Place of birth: Montevideo, Uruguay
- Height: 1.82 m (6 ft 0 in)
- Position: Forward

Team information
- Current team: Paysandu
- Number: 20

Youth career
- 2004: Nueva Palmira
- 2004–2010: Universal
- 2010–2015: River Plate Montevideo
- 2016–2017: Atlético Madrid

Senior career*
Years	Team	Apps	(Gls)
2015−2016	River Plate Montevideo	24	(4)
2017–2020	Atlético Madrid B	8	(0)
2018–2019	→ Rayo Majadahonda (loan)	13	(1)
2019	→ Parma (loan)	3	(0)
2019–2020	→ Famalicão (loan)	4	(0)
2020–2022	Sassuolo	1	(0)
2021	→ Peñarol (loan)	0	(0)
2022	Miramar Misiones	9	(2)
2023–2024	La Luz	15	(9)
2023–2024	→ Belgrano (loan)	5	(0)
2024–2025	Miramar Misiones	16	(1)
2025	River Plate (Montevideo)	5	(0)
2026	Amazonas	14	(7)
2026–	Paysandu	4	(0)

International career^{‡}
2013	Uruguay U15	11	(2)
2014–2015	Uruguay U17	22	(12)
2016–2019	Uruguay U20	47	(21)
2024–	Uruguay local	1	(0)
Medal record
Men's football
Representing Uruguay
South American U-20 Championship
Winner	2017 Ecuador
Third place	2019 Chile
- * Club domestic league appearances and goals as of 9 November 2026 ‡ National team caps and goals as of 1 September 2024

Nicolás Javier Schiappacasse Oliva (born 12 January 1999) is a Uruguayan professional footballer who plays as a forward for Paysandu.

== Club career ==
=== River Plate Montevideo ===
Born in Montevideo, Schiappacasse joined River Plate Montevideo's youth setup in 2014 at the age of 11, from Club Universal. On 5 January 2015, aged only 15, he started training with the first-team.

On 19 April 2015, already sold to Atlético Madrid, Schiappacasse made his main squad – and Primera División – debut, coming on as a late substitute for Santiago García in a 2–0 home win against Juventud. He scored his first professional goal on 23 May, netting his team's third in a 4–0 home routing of El Tanque Sisley.

=== Atlético Madrid ===
In July 2016, aged 17, Schiappacasse was a part of Atlético Madrid's pre-season under Diego Simeone. He was subsequently assigned to the Juvenil A squad, thus returning to youth football.

Schiappacasse made his debut for Atleti's B-team on 11 September 2016, replacing Caio Henrique and scoring his team's second in a 2–3 away loss against AD Unión Adarve in the Tercera División. He contributed with three goals in 14 appearances for the reserves, achieving promotion to the Segunda División B.

For the 2017–18 season, Schiappacasse only featured rarely for the B-side.

==== Loans ====
On 7 August 2018, Schiappacasse was loaned to CF Rayo Majadahonda of the Segunda División for a year.

On 31 January 2019, Schiappacasse signed for Serie A club Parma on loan until 30 June 2020.

On 18 July 2019, newly promoted Portuguese Primeira Liga side Famalicão announced the signing of Schiappacasse on a season-long loan deal.

=== Sassuolo ===
On 5 October 2020, Italian Serie A club Sassuolo announced the signing of Schiappacasse on a permanent basis.

==== Peñarol (loan) ====
On 30 March 2021, Schiappacasse returned to Uruguay after agreeing to a season-long loan deal with Peñarol.

== International career ==
Schiappacasse is a former Uruguay youth international. He has amassed 80 caps and 35 goals for different youth teams of Uruguay over six years. He was part of Uruguayan squad at the 2013 South American U-15 Championship, 2015 South American U-17 Championship, 2017 South American U-20 Championship, 2017 FIFA U-20 World Cup, 2019 South American U-20 Championship and the 2019 FIFA U-20 World Cup.

With 21 goals, Schiappacasse is the all-time top scorer of the Uruguay under-20 team. He is also second in number of matches played for the under-20 team, only behind Rodrigo Amaral. He also used to be joint all-time top scorer of the Uruguay under-17 team along with Franco Acosta, a feat which was surpassed by Facundo Torres in 2017.

On 1 September 2024, Schiappacasse made his debut for the Uruguay local national team in a 1–1 draw against Guatemala.

== Personal life ==
Schiappacasse is of Italian descent, and holds an Italian passport. On 26 January 2022, he was arrested by police in Uruguay for carrying a concealed firearm on his way to a derby between Nacional and Peñarol. He stated he was going to deliver it to a Peñarol hooligan.
