= Claudia López Benaiges =

Chilean anarchist killed by police

- Born: 28 November 1972; Santiago, Chile
- Died: 12 September 1998 (aged 25)
- Education: Metropolitan University of Educational Sciences; Academy of Christian Humanism University
- Occupation: Student

Claudia López Benaiges (1972–1998) was a Chilean student, dancer and anarchist who was killed after being shot by Carabineros at a demonstration in 1998 commemorating the 25th anniversary of the coup d'etat which deposed the government of Salvador Allende.

== Biography ==
Claudia López was born in Santiago on 28 November 1972, months before the 1973 coup. Her parents were Spanish teachers, and her father was a Communist Party (PCC) member. López studied Castilian Spanish at the Metropolitan University of Educational Sciences from 1992 and later began studying dance at the Academy of Christian Humanism University in 1996.

== Death and legacy ==
Lopez attended a protest on the night of 11 September 1998 in the barrio of La Pincoya, Santiago, marking the 25th anniversary of the coup led by Augusto Pinochet against the Chilean government. The anniversary was marked by nationwide marches across Chile. She was struck in the chest when Carabineros opened fire on protestors, and was pronounced dead at 00:53 on the morning of 12 September at the La Pincoya SAPU. According to an Amnesty International report, the Carabineros failed to provide any medical assistance, and her body was later picked up firefighters. 47 year old Cristian Osvaldo Varela Avalos, a local PCC leader, was also killed at the same demonstration, officially due to arterial hypertension, although his widow denied he had suffered from the condition, claiming that the first doctor who treated him stated he had died after inhaling tear gas. Police alleged that Lopez had been shot by demonstrators who had attacked the police station in La Pincoya, and declared that their response had been proportionate. The National Assembly for Human Rights accused the police forces of "brutal repression" against protestors.

López's death has often been cited as an example of ongoing repression and police brutality in the post-Pinochet era in Chile. Following her death, she became a martyr figure of the anarchist and student movements in Chile. In 2018, a communique from the group Cómplices Sediciosos/Fracción por la Venganza claimed responsibility for targeting the 54th Precinct of Huechuraba with explosives as it was the police station responsible for the territory where López had been killed 20 years prior.

== See also ==
- Rodrigo Cisterna
