= Facundo Waller =

Uruguayan footballer (born 1997)

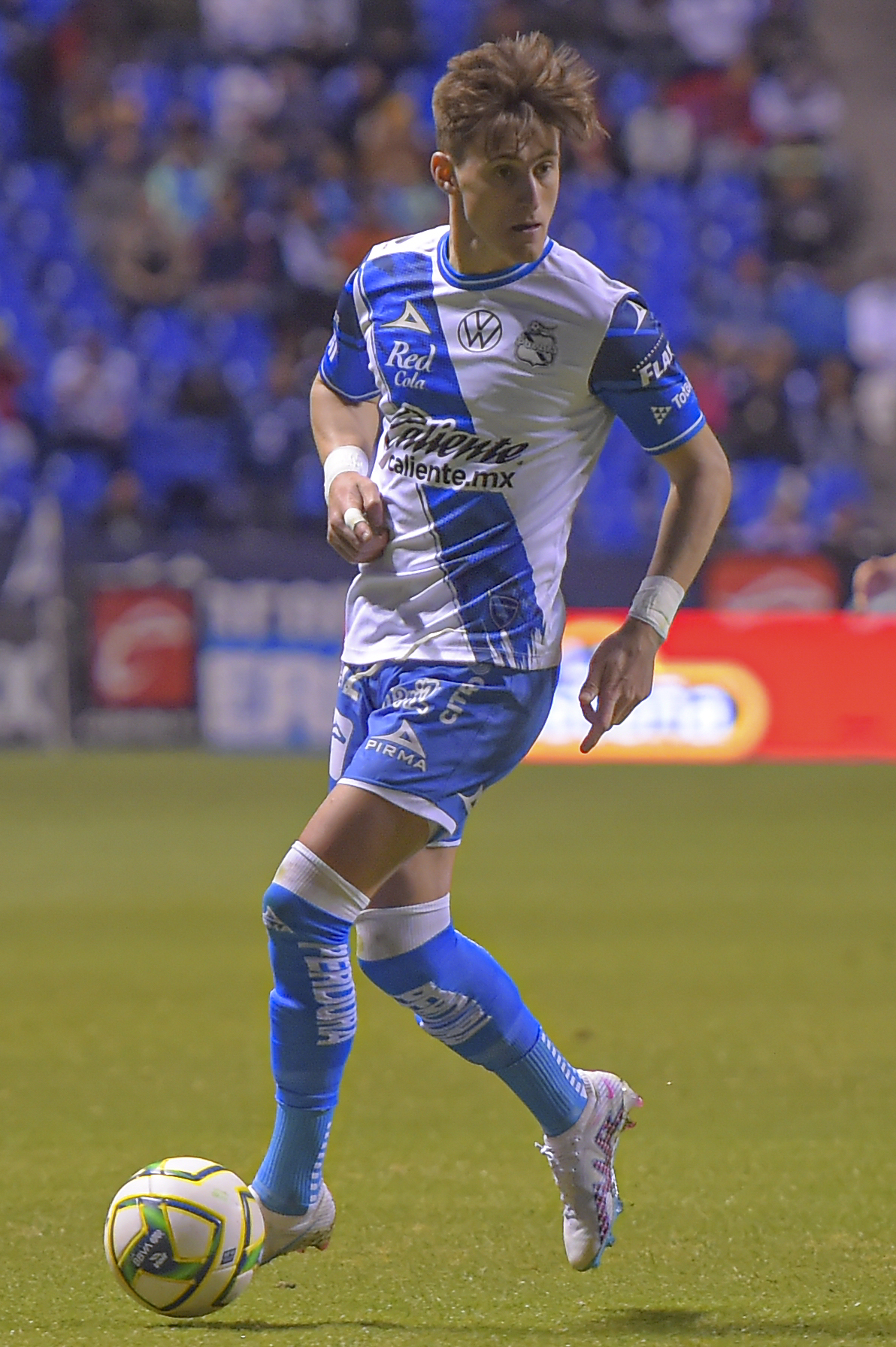
- Waller with Puebla in 2023

Personal information
- Full name: Facundo Federico Waller Martiarena
- Date of birth: 9 April 1997 (age 29)
- Place of birth: Colonia del Sacramento, Uruguay
- Height: 1.73 m (5 ft 8 in)
- Position: Winger

Team information
- Current team: Huracán
- Number: 15

Youth career
- Plaza Colonia

Senior career*
Years	Team	Apps	(Gls)
2014–2022	Plaza Colonia	79	(8)
2018	→ Nacional (loan)	0	(0)
2020–2021	→ UNAM (loan)	33	(1)
2021–2022	→ Atlético San Luis (loan)	32	(3)
2022	Atlético San Luis	17	(1)
2023–2026	Puebla	44	(3)
2025–2026	→ Huracán (loan)	24	(1)
2026–	Huracán	0	(0)

International career
2015–2017	Uruguay U20	27	(3)
2019	Uruguay U22	4	(0)
2020	Uruguay U23	8	(0)
Medal record
Men's football
Representing Uruguay
South American U-20 Championship
Winner	2017 Ecuador
- * Club domestic league appearances and goals as of 17:36, 6 July 2026 (UTC)

Facundo Federico Waller Martiarena (born 9 April 1997) is a Uruguayan professional footballer who plays as a midfielder for Argentine Primera División club Huracán, on loan from Liga MX club Puebla.

== Club career ==
A youth academy graduate of Plaza Colonia, Waller made his professional debut on 19 April 2014 in a 1–1 draw against Rocha. He scored his first goal on 19 March 2017 in a 2–3 defeat against Sud América.

In February 2018, Waller joined Nacional on a season long loan deal. However, he couldn't play any matches for the senior team due to injuries.

On 13 August 2020, Liga MX club UNAM announced the signing of Waller on a season long loan deal with option to buy. In April 2021, UNAM decided not to activate his purchase option and announced his departure from the club.

On 10 July 2021, Waller joined Atlético San Luis on a two-year deal.

== International career ==
Waller is a former Uruguayan youth international. He was part of under-20 team squad which won 2017 South American U-20 Championship and reached semi-finals of 2017 FIFA U-20 World Cup.

Waller was part of under-22 team which reached semi-finals at 2019 Pan American Games. Later that year, he was named in 23-man final squad for 2020 CONMEBOL Pre-Olympic Tournament.

== Honours ==
Individual

- Uruguayan Primera División Team of the Year: 2019
