= Juan Sforza =

Argentine footballer

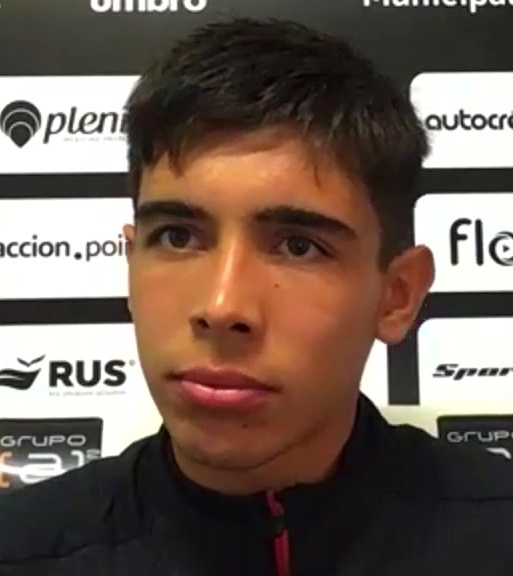
- Sforza in 2021

Personal information
- Full name: Juan Sebastián Sforza
- Date of birth: 14 February 2002 (age 24)
- Place of birth: Rosario, Argentina
- Height: 1.79 m (5 ft 10 in)
- Position: Centre midfielder

Team information
- Current team: Talleres (on loan from Vasco da Gama)
- Number: 13

Youth career
- Santa Teresita
- Unión de Álvarez
- Sarmiento
- Fundación Messi
- 2015–2020: Newell's Old Boys

Senior career*
Years	Team	Apps	(Gls)
2020–2023	Newell's Old Boys	96	(4)
2024–	Vasco da Gama	35	(1)
2025	→ Juventude (loan)	8	(0)
2026–	→ Talleres (loan)	22	(0)

International career
- Argentina U15
2018–2019	Argentina U17	13	(1)
- * Club domestic league appearances and goals as of 17:41, 15 November 2026 (UTC)

Juan Sebastián Sforza (born 14 February 2002) is an Argentine professional footballer who plays as a centre midfielder for Talleres, on loan from Vasco da Gama.

== Club career ==
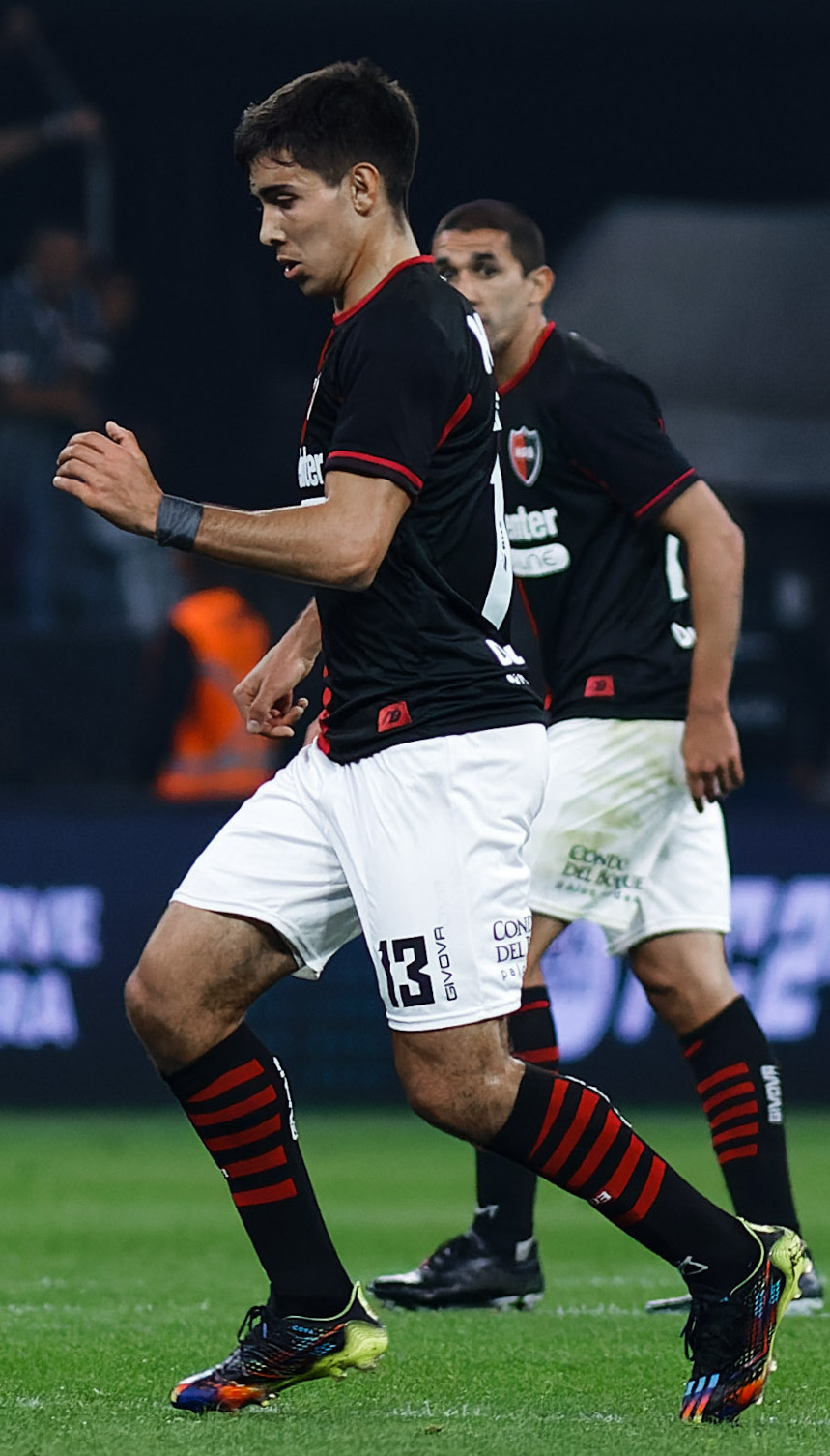
Sforza with Newell's Old Boys in 2023

Sforza began his career at the age of eight with Santa Teresita, before moving over to Unión de Álvarez and then Sarmiento. He soon penned terms with Fundación Messi, an academy set up by Lionel Messi; Lionel's brother, Matías, became one of Sforza's agents in 2019. In 2015, Sforza joined Newell's Old Boys. He progressed through their academy for the next five years, notably captaining their reserves. Sforza signed his first professional contract on 13 March 2019. His breakthrough into the first-team wouldn't arrive for another twelve months, though would do so in late-2020 under manager Frank Darío Kudelka.

Sforza's senior debut arrived on 19 December 2020 in a Copa de la Liga Profesional win away to Godoy Cruz, as the midfielder replaced Julián Fernández with four minutes remaining. He had previously been an unused substitute five times in that competition. His first career goal arrived soon after during a victory over Central Córdoba on 28 December.

== International career ==
Sforza represented Argentina at U15 and U17 level; as captain of both. He was a part of the squad that won the 2017 South American U-15 Championship on home soil, as he netted goals against invitees Czech Republic and, in the semi-finals, Peru. After appearing for the U17s in a friendly with the United States in 2018, the midfielder was selected by Pablo Aimar in 2019 for the South American U-17 Championship in Peru and FIFA U-17 World Cup in Brazil. He scored once, versus Uruguay, in eight appearances at the former as they won the trophy, before featuring four times at latter as they reached the round of sixteen.

== Personal life ==
Born and raised in Argentina, Sforza is of Italian descent.

== Career statistics ==
As of 28 December 2020.

Appearances and goals by club, season and competition
Club	Season	League			Cup		League Cup		Continental		Other		Total	
Club	Season	Division	Apps	Goals	Apps	Goals	Apps	Goals	Apps	Goals	Apps	Goals	Apps	Goals
Newell's Old Boys	2020–21 (Note: Soccerway counts Copa de la Liga Profesional appearances as league appearances.)	Primera División	2	1	1	0	0	0	—		0	0	3	1
Career total			2	1	1	0	0	0	—		0	0	3	1

== Honours ==
Argentina U15

- South American U-15 Championship: 2017

Argentina U17

- South American U-17 Championship: 2019
