= José Luis Sierra (footballer, born 1997) =

Chilean footballer

Personal information
- Full name: José Luis Sierra Cabrera
- Date of birth: 24 June 1997 (age 29)
- Place of birth: Santiago, Chile
- Height: 1.82 m (6 ft 0 in)
- Position: Forward

Youth career
- Unión Española

Senior career*
Years	Team	Apps	(Gls)
2014–2019	Unión Española	43	(5)
2020	Bisceglie	1	(0)
2020–2021	Deportes Temuco	2	(0)
2021	Deportes Colina	13	(0)
2022	Unión Española	0	(0)
Total		59	(5)

International career
2015–2017	Chile U20	6	(2)
- * Club domestic league appearances and goals

José Luis Sierra Cabrera (born 24 June 1997) is a Chilean former footballer who played as a forward.

== Club career ==
On 21 January 2020, he signed a two-year contract with Italian third-tier Serie C club Bisceglie.

On April 29, 2021, he joined Chilean Segunda División side Deportes Colina.

After the 2022 season with Unión Española, he retired from professional football at the age of twenty-five, joining the amateur club La Masía from Estadio Español based in Las Condes, Santiago.

== International career ==
He represented Chile U20 at two South American Youth Football Championships: 2015 in Uruguay and 2017 in Ecuador.

== Personal life ==
He is the son of the former Chilean international footballer José Luis Sierra.

His paternal grandparents, Domingo Sierra and Pilar Pando, are Spanish immigrants in Chile of Galician and Asturian origin, respectively.

Belonging to a football family, his grandfather was a director of Unión Española and his great-great-uncle, Félix Cantín, was a doctor and midfielder of Unión Deportiva Española from 1928 to 1932.

His cousin, Benjamín Sierra, who is also the nephew of the football manager Sebastián Miranda, plays at the Spanish Kings League.
