= Matías Ocampo =

Uruguayan football player (born 2002)

Personal information
- Full name: Matías Ernesto Ocampo Ornizún
- Date of birth: 14 March 2002 (age 24)
- Place of birth: Montevideo, Uruguay
- Height: 1.80 m (5 ft 11 in)
- Position: Midfielder

Team information
- Current team: Bhayangkara Presisi
- Number: 99

Youth career
- Defensor Sporting

Senior career*
Years	Team	Apps	(Gls)
2020–2021	Defensor Sporting	41	(3)
2022	River Plate Montevideo	34	(7)
2023	Bellinzona	17	(1)
2023–2025	Liverpool Montevideo	30	(4)
2024–2025	→ Brusque (loan)	4	(0)
2025	Cerro	27	(0)
2026	Cerro	7	(1)
2026–	Bhayangkara Presisi	1	(0)

International career
2016–2017	Uruguay U15	29	(8)
2018–2019	Uruguay U17	24	(5)
- * Club domestic league appearances and goals as of 5 September 2026

Matías Ernesto Ocampo Ornizún (born 14 March 2002) is a Uruguayan professional footballer who plays as a midfielder for Super League club Bhayangkara Presisi.

== Club career ==
A youth academy graduate of Defensor Sporting, Ocampo made his professional debut on 30 August 2020 in a 2–1 league win against Liverpool Montevideo.

In January 2023, Ocampo joined Swiss club Bellinzona. In July 2024, he joined Brazilian club Brusque on a one-year loan deal.

== International career ==
Ocampo is a former Uruguayan youth international. He has represented his nation at the 2017 South American U-15 Championship and the 2019 South American U-17 Championship.

== Career statistics ==
As of 21 October 2022

Appearances and goals by club, season and competition
Club	Season	League			Cup		Continental		Other		Total	
Club	Season	Division	Apps	Goals	Apps	Goals	Apps	Goals	Apps	Goals	Apps	Goals
Defensor Sporting	2020	Uruguayan Primera División	21	2	—		—		—		21	2
Defensor Sporting	2021	Uruguayan Segunda División	20	1	—		—		1 (Note: Appearance in championship play-offs)	0	21	1
Defensor Sporting	Total		41	3	0	0	0	0	1	0	42	3
River Plate Montevideo	2022	Uruguayan Primera División	34	7	0	0	5 (Note: Appearances in Copa Sudamericana)	0	—		39	7
Career total			75	10	0	0	5	0	1	0	81	10

== Honours ==
Liverpool Montevideo

- Uruguayan Primera División: 2023
- Supercopa Uruguaya: 2024
