= Juan Krilanovich =

Argentine footballer (born 2002)

Personal information
- Full name: Juan Pablo Krilanovich
- Date of birth: 7 April 2002 (age 24)
- Place of birth: Adrogué, Argentina
- Height: 1.79 m (5 ft 10 in)
- Position: Winger

Team information
- Current team: Arsenal Sarandí

Youth career
- Cultural Guernica
- 2008–2020: Lanús

Senior career*
Years	Team	Apps	(Gls)
2020–2023	Lanús	5	(0)
2023	→ Atlanta (loan)	14	(0)
2024–	Arsenal Sarandí	14	(0)

International career
2017	Argentina U15		
2019	Argentina U17		
- * Club domestic league appearances and goals as of 18:15, 4 June 2025 (UTC)

Juan Pablo Krilanovich (born 7 April 2002) is an Argentine professional footballer who plays as a winger for Arsenal Sarandí.

== Club career ==
Krilanovich began his youth career at the age of six with Cultural Guernica; a town that he grew up in, having been born in Adrogué. In 2008, Krilanovich was signed by Lanús. He progressed through their youth ranks for twelve years, prior to making the move into Luis Zubeldía's first-team squad in 2020. After going unused on the substitute's bench for matches with Talleres, Newell's Old Boys and, in the Copa Sudamericana, Independiente, Krilanovich played eighty-six minutes of a victory on the road versus Aldosivi in the Copa de la Liga Profesional on 13 December 2020; he was subbed off for fellow debutant Kevin Lomónaco.

== International career ==
Krilanovich represented Argentina at U15 and U17 level. He scored twice, versus Chile and invitees Czech Republic, as they won the 2017 South American U-15 Championship on home soil. Krilanovich later netted one goal, against Paraguay, in five appearances at the 2019 South American U-17 Championship in Peru, as they won the trophy and qualified for the FIFA U-17 World Cup in Brazil; where he scored, versus Cameroon, across two matches.

== Career statistics ==
As of 13 December 2020

Appearances and goals by club, season and competition
Club	Season	League			Cup		League Cup		Continental		Other		Total	
Club	Season	Division	Apps	Goals	Apps	Goals	Apps	Goals	Apps	Goals	Apps	Goals	Apps	Goals
Lanús	2020–21 (Note: Soccerway counts Copa de la Liga Profesional appearances as league appearances.)	Primera División	4	0	0	0	0	0	0	0	0	0	4	0
Career total			4	0	0	0	0	0	0	0	0	0	4	0

== Honours ==
Argentina U15

- South American U-15 Championship: 2017

Argentina U17

- South American U-17 Championship: 2019
