= Diego Duarte (footballer, born 2002) =

Paraguayan footballer (born 2002)

Personal information
- Full name: Diego Ariel Duarte Garcete
- Date of birth: 8 April 2002 (age 24)
- Place of birth: Asunción, Paraguay
- Height: 1.76 m (5 ft 9 in)
- Position: Forward

Team information
- Current team: Inter Bogotá (on loan from Nacional)
- Number: 9

Senior career*
Years	Team	Apps	(Gls)
2020–2022	Olimpia	10	(0)
2023	Sportivo Ameliano	18	(2)
2024–	Nacional	36	(8)
2025–2026	→ AVS (loan)	27	(3)
2026–	→ Inter Bogotá (loan)	9	(2)

International career^{‡}
2019	Paraguay U17	13	(6)
2019	Paraguay U18	2	(0)
- * Club domestic league appearances and goals as of 12 September 2026 ‡ National team caps and goals as of 11:19, 16 September 2020 (UTC)

Diego Ariel Duarte Garcete, known as Diego Duarte (born 8 April 2002) is a Paraguayan footballer who plays as a forward for Colombian club Inter Bogotá on loan from Nacional.

== Career statistics ==
=== Club ===
As of 16 September 2020.

Club	Season	League			Cup		Continental		Other		Total	
Club	Season	Division	Apps	Goals	Apps	Goals	Apps	Goals	Apps	Goals	Apps	Goals
Club Olimpia	2020	Paraguayan Primera División	1	0	0	0	0	0	0	0	1	0
Career total			1	0	0	0	0	0	0	0	1	0
