= Yorlen Cordero =

Venezuelan footballer (born 2002)

Personal information
- Full name: Yorlen José Cordero Díaz
- Date of birth: 5 February 2002 (age 24)
- Place of birth: Maturín, Venezuela
- Height: 1.71 m (5 ft 7 in)
- Position: Right winger

Youth career
- Monagas

Senior career*
Years	Team	Apps	(Gls)
2018–2021	Monagas	37	(1)
2022–2023	Mineros de Guayana		
2025	Titanes de Lara		

International career
- Venezuela U-15
2019	Venezuela U-17	4	(0)
- * Club domestic league appearances and goals as of 19:08, 30 October 2023 (UTC)

Yorlen José Cordero Díaz (born 5 February 2002) is a Venezuelan footballer who plays as a right winger.

== Career ==
=== Club career ===
Cordero is a product of Monagas, where he played since childhood. On 8 August 2018, Cordero got his official debut for Monagas against LALA FC in Copa Venezuela. His league debut came in October 2018 against Deportivo Anzoátegui, which was one out of his two league appearances in the 2018 season.

In the 2019 season, Cordero only made one appearance in the league for Monagas, while he made seven in Copa Venezuela. He got his breakthrough for Monagas in the 2020 season, with 16 games and one goal. After leaving Monagas at the end of 2021, Cordero remained without contract until June 2022, where he signed with Mineros de Guayana.
