= Roberto Siucho =

Peruvian footballer (born 1997)

Personal information
- Birth name: Roberto Siucho Neira
- Date of birth: 7 February 1997 (age 29)
- Place of birth: Lima, Peru
- Height: 1.70 m (5 ft 7 in)
- Positions: Forward; winger

Team information
- Current team: Alianza Atlético (on loan from Universitario)
- Number: 23

Youth career
- 2010–2013: Universitario

Senior career*
Years	Team	Apps	(Gls)
2013–2018	Universitario	111	(8)
2019–2021	Guangzhou FC	0	(0)
2019	→ Shanghai Shenxin (loan)	10	(1)
2020–2021	→ Kunshan FC (loan)	28	(2)
2023–	Universitario	0	(0)
2024–	→ Alianza Atlético (loan)	13	(0)

International career
2013	Peru U17	7	(3)
2015–2017	Peru U20	10	(2)
- * Club domestic league appearances and goals as of 14:57, 22 January 2024 (UTC)

Roberto Siucho Neira (Chinese: 萧涛涛; pinyin: Xiāo Tāotāo; born 7 February 1997) is a Peruvian professional footballer who plays as a forward or winger for Peruvian Liga 1 club Alianza Atlético, on loan from Universitario de Deportes.

== Club career ==
Siucho joined Peruvian club Universitario's youth academy in 2010 and was promoted to the first team in July 2013 under manager Ángel Comizzo. On 14 July 2013, he made his senior debut in a 0–0 draw against Real Garcilaso at the age of 16. The next year, he alternated between the reserves and the first team and made his international competition debut as a starter in a 3–3 Copa Libertadores draw against The Strongest. He became a regular player in the 2015 season and scored his first senior goal on 9 August 2015 against Sport Loreto. In the 2016 season he played in 22 matches, in most of them coming from the bench.

On 31 January 2019, Universitario announced Siucho had transferred to Chinese Super League side Guangzhou Evergrande Taobao. In February 2019, Siucho was loaned to China League One side Shanghai Shenxin for the 2019 season.

On 14 February 2020, he renounced his Peruvian nationality and obtained Chinese citizenship. For this reason, he changed his name from Roberto Siucho to Xiao Taotao.

In 2023, in a surprise move, Siucho decided to return to Peru and reobtained Peruvian citizenship to play for Universitario.

In January 2024, having failed to make an appearances during the 2023 season with Universitario, Siucho joined Alianza Atlético on loan until the end of the year.

== International career ==
Siucho was called to play for Peru at U17 and U20 level, playing in the 2013 South American U-17 Championship, 2015 South American U-20 Championship and 2017 South American U-20 Championship. In March 2018, he was called up to the Peru senior squad for the first time for friendlies against Croatia and Iceland but was an unused substitute in both matches.

== Personal life ==
Siucho's grandfather was from Dachong Town, Xiangshan County, Guangdong, China. His family name is transliterated from Chinese surname Xiao (萧). His sister, Ana, married to Peru's international footballer Edison Flores, making him brother-in-law to Edison.

== Career statistics ==
As of 31 December 2021

Appearances and goals by club, season and competition
Club	Season	League			National cup		League cup		Continental		Total	
Club	Season	Division	Apps	Goals	Apps	Goals	Apps	Goals	Apps	Goals	Apps	Goals
Universitario	2013	Peruvian Primera División	3	0	0	0	—		—		3	0
Universitario	2014	Peruvian Primera División	0	0	5	0	—		2	0	7	0
Universitario	2015	Peruvian Primera División	17	1	3	0	—		1	0	21	1
Universitario	2016	Peruvian Primera División	22	0	0	0	—		2	0	24	0
Universitario	2017	Peruvian Primera División	34	3	0	0	—		0	0	34	3
Universitario	2018	Peruvian Primera División	35	4	0	0	—		2	0	37	4
Universitario	Total		111	8	8	0	0	0	7	0	126	8
Shanghai Shenxin (loan)	2019	China League One	10	1	0	0	—		—		10	1
Kunshan (loan)	2020	China League One	6	0	0	0	—		—		6	0
Kunshan (loan)	2021	China League One	22	2	1	1	—		—		23	3
Kunshan (loan)	Total		38	3	1	1	0	0	0	0	39	4
Career total			149	11	9	1	0	0	7	0	165	12

== Honours ==
=== Club ===
Universitario de Deportes

- Torneo Descentralizado: 2013
- Peruvian Primera División: 2023

== See also ==
- List of Chinese naturalized footballers
