= Rodrigo Cisterna =

Chilean forestry worker (1980–2007)

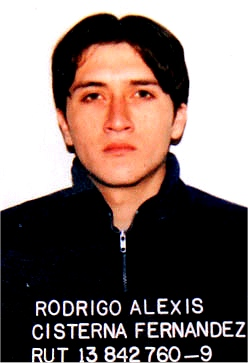
- ID photograph created by the Civil Registry and Identification Service of Chile.
- Born: Rodrigo Alexis Cisterna Fernández; 8 November 1980; Laraquete, Arauco, Chile
- Died: 3 May 2007 (aged 26); Laraquete, Arauco, Chile
- Cause of death: Shot by police
- Occupation: Forestry worker
- Spouse: Evelyn Sanhueza Nauco
- Children: 1

Rodrigo Alexis Cisterna Fernández (8 November 1980 – 3 May 2007) was a Chilean forestry worker shot and killed by police officer during a workers' protest for an improvement in their working conditions on the night of 3 May 2007, in the town of Laraquete, Arauco Province, Biobío Region, about 60 kilometers from the city of Concepción, in front of the Horcones Pulp Mill, owned by Chilean businessman Anacleto Angelini. During the protest, Carabineros started destroying the workers' cars as to persuade them to dissolve, to which Cisterna responded by getting in a bulldozer and started flipping over police vehicles, destroying them in the process.

To this day, Chilean authorities have refused to charge police involved with his death, despite facing international backlash and legal action, including from the Inter-American Commission on Human Rights. In 2016, the day of his death (3 May) was declared as national day of the forest worker by then-president Michelle Bachelet.

== Biography ==
Rodrigo Cisterna Fernández was born in Laraquete, but raised in the town of Curanilahue. His father died in 1993, when Rodrigo was only 13 years old. He completed his secondary education in Lebu, where he later graduated as a mechanical technician. At the time of his death he lived with his wife, Evelyn Elizabeth Sanhueza Nauco, and six-year-old son, Rodrigo Abraham Cisterna Sanhueza, in Curanilahue.

=== Death ===
During May 2007, some 3,000 subcontracted forestry workers took to the streets to demonstrate for better working conditions, including an increase of 40,000 Chilean pesos to their base salary. During the protest, members of the local Carabineros de Chile police force arrived and started destroying the workers' vehicles as to persuade them to dissolve, to which Cisterna responded by getting in a bulldozer and started flipping over police vehicles, destroying 7 police cars overall. Members of the Special Forces of the Carabineros responded by shooting him four times, with the fatal bullet reaching his skull from behind, while five other workers were seriously injured.

=== Court rulings ===
In April 2013, the First Civil Court of Concepción determined the responsibility of the police and the Chilean state in the crime, ordering a compensation of 30 million pesos to the widow of the murdered worker, 10 million pesos each to four other workers injured by gunshot, while 20 million to a fifth worker, who lost sight in his left eye. However, this ruling was rejected by the Supreme Court in January 2016.

Several government sources, particularly those from the Ministry of the Interior, have been accused of trying to blame Cisterna's death on striking workers without any prior investigation.

== Legacy ==
After the death of Rodrigo Cisterna, the mobilization of subcontracted workers that began weeks before his death came to an end. After the events, the 23 demands of the union petition were met, managing to equate the working conditions of plant workers with subcontracted workers. Over 25,000 people went to his funeral, coming from all over the country.

After his death, a wave of protests and strikes by subcontracted workers began in the country, most notably with those of CODELCO and ENAP. In Chile, inter-company unions did not have legal existence at the time of these events.

His mother died on April 21, 2022, without having received any judicial backlash regarding the murder of her son.

His death joins other emblematic cases of citizens killed in social protests during governments posterior to the military dictatorship in Chile, including the deaths of Claudia López Benaiges, Daniel Menco, Alex Lemun Saavedra, Matías Catrileo, Jaime Mendoza Collio, and Camilo Catrillanca (the 4 latter being members of the indigenous Mapuche people).

== See also ==
- Marvin Heemeyer
