= Tomás Castro Ponce =

Argentine footballer (born 2001)

Personal information
- Full name: Tomás Ezequiel Castro Ponce
- Date of birth: 3 March 2001 (age 25)
- Place of birth: Concarán, Argentina
- Height: 1.86 m (6 ft 1 in)
- Position: Attacking midfielder

Team information
- Current team: Atlanta
- Number: 8

Youth career
- Escuela de Fútbol EFIC
- 2014–2021: River Plate

Senior career*
Years	Team	Apps	(Gls)
2020–2026	River Plate	1	(0)
2022	→ Godoy Cruz (loan)	16	(0)
2023–2024	→ Atlético Tucumán (loan)	26	(1)
2025	→ Almagro (loan)	30	(0)
2026–	Atlanta	9	(0)
- * Club domestic league appearances and goals as of 16:30, 24 April 2026 (UTC)

Tomás Ezequiel Castro Ponce (born 3 March 2001) is an Argentine professional footballer who plays as an attacking midfielder for Atlanta of the Primera Nacional, the second division in Argentine football league system. He comes from River Plate's academy in the Primera Division.

== Career ==
Castro Ponce is a product of the River Plate youth system, having joined in 2014 from Escuela de Fútbol EFIC. He notably scored goals against Millonarios and Libertad at the 2020 U-20 Copa Libertadores in Paraguay. He made the breakthrough into Marcelo Gallardo's first-team squad later that year, appearing as an unused substitute in early November for Copa de la Liga Profesional victories away to Godoy Cruz and Banfield. Castro Ponce made his senior debut in the same competition on 28 November against Rosario Central, featuring for the final eight minutes of a two-goal away win.

On 5 January 2022, Ponce joined Godoy Cruz on a one-year loan deal with a purchase option.

== Career statistics ==
As of 29 November 2020.

Appearances and goals by club, season and competition
Club	Season	League			Cup		League Cup		Continental		Other		Total	
Club	Season	Division	Apps	Goals	Apps	Goals	Apps	Goals	Apps	Goals	Apps	Goals	Apps	Goals
River Plate	2020–21 (Note: Soccerway counts Copa de la Liga Profesional appearances as league appearances.)	Primera División	1	0	0	0	0	0	0	0	0	0	1	0
Career total			1	0	0	0	0	0	0	0	0	0	1	0
