= Kennan Sepúlveda =

Chilean footballer (born 2002)

Personal information
- Full name: Kennan Jesús Sepúlveda Acevedo
- Date of birth: 8 February 2002 (age 24)
- Place of birth: Valparaíso, Chile
- Height: 1.78 m (5 ft 10 in)
- Position: Forward

Team information
- Current team: Unión Glorias Navales
- Number: 35

Youth career
- Santiago Wanderers

Senior career*
Years	Team	Apps	(Gls)
2019–2022	Santiago Wanderers	11	(1)
2022–2024	San Luis	28	(3)
2025	Brujas de Salamanca	9	(1)
2026–	Unión Glorias Navales	–	(–)

International career^{‡}
2017	Chile U15		
2018–2019	Chile U17	10	(0)
- * Club domestic league appearances and goals as of 24 March 2026 ‡ National team caps and goals as of 30 January 2021

Kennan Jesús Sepúlveda Acevedo (born 8 February 2002) is a Chilean footballer who plays as a forward for Unión Glorias Navales in the Chilean Tercera B.

== Career ==
In 2026, Sepúlveda joined Unión Glorias Navales in the Chilean Tercera B.

== Career statistics ==
=== Club ===
As of 30 January 2021.

Club	Season	League			Cup		Other		Total	
Club	Season	Division	Apps	Goals	Apps	Goals	Apps	Goals	Apps	Goals
Santiago Wanderers	2019	Primera B de Chile	4	1	0	0	0	0	4	1
Santiago Wanderers	2020	Chilean Primera División	1	0	0	0	0	0	1	0
Santiago Wanderers	2021	Chilean Primera División	0	0	0	0	0	0	0	0
Career total			5	1	0	0	0	0	5	1
