= Yoni Mosquera =

Portuguese footballer (born 2002)

Personal information
- Full name: Yoni Alejandro Mosquera Palacio
- Date of birth: 23 March 2002 (age 24)
- Place of birth: Apartadó, Colombia
- Height: 1.78 m (5 ft 10 in)
- Position: Left-back

Team information
- Current team: Águilas Doradas

Youth career
- 2015–2019: Estudiantil
- 2019–2022: Leones
- 2020–2021: → Porto (loan)
- 2021: Leixões (loan)

Senior career*
Years	Team	Apps	(Gls)
2020–2022	Leones	0	(0)
2020–2021	→ Porto B (loan)	1	(0)
2022–	Águilas Doradas	6	(0)

International career^{‡}
2018	Colombia U17	4	(1)
- * Club domestic league appearances and goals as of 1 August 2021 ‡ National team caps and goals as of 7 February 2021

Yoni Alejandro Mosquera Palacio (born 23 March 2002) is a Colombian professional footballer who plays as a left-back for Águilas Doradas.

== Club career ==
Mosquera is a youth product of Estudiantil and Leones before moving to Porto B on 25 September 2020. He made his professional debut with Porto B in a 4–0 Liga Portugal 2 loss to S.C. Covilhã on 31 October 2020.
