= Luciano Arriagada =

Chilean footballer (born 2002)

Personal information
- Full name: Luciano Daniel Arriagada García
- Date of birth: 20 April 2002 (age 24)
- Place of birth: Lota, Chile
- Height: 1.84 m (6 ft 0 in)
- Position: Forward

Team information
- Current team: Huachipato
- Number: 16

Youth career
- Colo-Colo

Senior career*
Years	Team	Apps	(Gls)
2020–2022	Colo-Colo	15	(3)
2023–2025	Athletico Paranaense	18	(1)
2024	→ Audax Italiano (loan)	13	(2)
2025–	Huachipato	6	(0)

International career^{‡}
2017	Chile U15		
2020	Chile U20	3	(1)
2021–	Chile	1	(0)
2024	Chile U23	4	(0)
- * Club domestic league appearances and goals as of 11 December 2025 ‡ National team caps and goals as of 13 February 2024

Luciano Daniel Arriagada García (born 30 April 2002) is a Chilean professional footballer who plays as a forward for Huachipato.

== Club career ==
After leaving Colo-Colo, Arriagada moved abroad in 2023 and joined Brazilian club Athletico Paranaense on a deal until the 2025 season. In 2024, he returned to Chile by signing with Audax Italiano on a one-year loan with an option to buy. Back to Brazil, he ended his contract in June 2025.

On 28 June 2025, Arriagada signed with Huachipato.

== International career ==
At early age, he represented Chile at under-15 level in the 2017 South American U-15 Championship. In addition, he represented Chile U20 in a friendly tournament played in Teresópolis (Brazil) called Granja Comary International Tournament, making appearances in all the matches against Peru U20, Bolivia U20, and Brazil U20, scoring a goal in the second match.

Later, he was called up to the first training microcycle of the Chile senior team on 2021 and to the Chile squad for the 2021 Copa América, making his international debut in the match against Uruguay on June 21.

In 2024, he took part in the Pre-Olympic Tournament.

== Career statistics ==
=== Club ===
As of 28 February 2023.

Club	Season	League			Cup		Continental		State League		Other		Total	
Club	Season	Division	Apps	Goals	Apps	Goals	Apps	Goals	Apps	Goals	Apps	Goals	Apps	Goals
Colo-Colo	2020	Chilean Primera División	4	1	0	0	0	0	—		—		4	1
Colo-Colo	2021	Chilean Primera División	10	2	3	0	0	0	—		—		13	2
Colo-Colo	2022	Chilean Primera División	1	0	1	0	0	0	—		0	0	2	0
Colo-Colo	Total		15	3	4	0	0	0	—		0	0	19	3
Athletico Paranaense	2023	Série A	0	0	0	0	0	0	2 (Note: Appearance(s) in Campeonato Paranaense)	1	0	0	2	1
Career total			15	3	4	0	0	0	2	1	0	0	21	4

== Honours ==
Colo-Colo

- Copa Chile: 2021
- Chilean Primera División: 2022
- Supercopa de Chile: 2022

Athletico Paranaense

- Campeonato Paranaense: 2023

Huachipato

- Copa Chile: 2025
