= Javier Arape =

Venezuelan footballer (born 2001)

Personal information
- Full name: Javier Enrique Arape Quevedo
- Date of birth: 5 June 2001 (age 25)
- Place of birth: Puerto Cabello, Venezuela
- Position: Forward

Team information
- Current team: Nueva Esparta
- Number: 11

Youth career
- Academia Puerto Cabello

Senior career*
Years	Team	Apps	(Gls)
2018–2022	Academia Puerto Cabello	50	(5)
2024–	Nueva Esparta		
- * Club domestic league appearances and goals as of 19 January 2019

Javier Enrique Arape Quevedo (born 5 June 2001) is a Venezuelan footballer who plays for Nueva Esparta in the Venezuelan Primera División.

== Club career ==
=== Academia Puerto Cabello ===
A graduate of the Academia Puerto Cabello youth academy, Arape made his competitive debut for the club on 18 May 2018 in a 0–0 home draw with Zulia FC, coming on as a sub in the 55th minute for Luifer Hernández.
