= Juan Manuel Gutiérrez =

Uruguayan footballer (born 2002)

Personal information
- Full name: Juan Manuel Gutiérrez Freire
- Date of birth: 4 February 2002 (age 24)
- Place of birth: Atlántida, Uruguay
- Height: 1.77 m (5 ft 10 in)
- Position: Forward

Team information
- Current team: Defensa y Justicia
- Number: 24

Youth career
- 2015–2018: Danubio

Senior career*
Years	Team	Apps	(Gls)
2018–2020	Danubio	37	(2)
2020–2021	Almería B	17	(1)
2020–2026	Almería	0	(0)
2021–2023	→ Nacional (loan)	3	(0)
2023–2025	→ Boston River (loan)	66	(15)
2025–2026	→ Defensa y Justicia (loan)	28	(4)
2026–	Defensa y Justicia	0	(0)

International career
2016–2017	Uruguay U15	32	(17)
2018–2019	Uruguay U17	21	(6)
- * Club domestic league appearances and goals as of 17:51, 10 May 2026 (UTC)

Juan Manuel Gutiérrez Freire (born 4 February 2002) is a Uruguayan professional footballer who plays as a forward for Argentine club Defensa y Justicia.

== Club career ==
=== Danubio ===
Born in Atlántida, Gutiérrez joined Danubio in 2015, aged 13. On 16 May 2018, he made his first team – and Primera División – debut, coming on as a late substitute for Nicolás Prieto in a 0–2 home loss against Montevideo Wanderers; aged 16 years, three months and 12 days, he became the youngest player to debut for the club in the 21st century.

Gutiérrez scored his first professional goal on 25 August 2019, netting his team's only in a 1–3 defeat at Defensor Sporting. He only scored one further goal for the first team, against Montevideo City Torque, before leaving in September 2020.

=== Almería ===
On 13 September 2020, UD Almería reached an agreement in principle with Danubio for the transfer of Gutiérrez. He was announced by his new club two days later, after agreeing to a five-year contract.

Gutiérrez featured almost exclusively for the reserves in Tercera División, and moved back to his home country on 27 August 2021, after agreeing to a two-year loan deal with Nacional. On 21 July 2023, after being rarely used, he joined Boston River on loan for one year.

=== Defensa y Justicia ===
On 26 July 2025, Gutiérrez moved to Argentine Primera División side Defensa y Justicia on a one-year loan deal. On 16 June 2026, the club activated his buyout clause, with the player signing a permanent four-year deal.
