= Ronaldo Monteiro =

Bolivian footballer (born 1998)

Personal information
- Full name: Ronaldo Monteiro Pedraza
- Date of birth: 11 January 1998 (age 28)
- Place of birth: Santa Cruz de la Sierra, Bolivia
- Height: 1.91 m (6 ft 3 in)
- Position: Forward

Team information
- Current team: Ciudad Nueva Santa Cruz
- Number: 37

Youth career
- Bolívar

Senior career*
Years	Team	Apps	(Gls)
2016–2018	Bolívar	4	(0)
2019	Real Potosí	8	(2)
2019	Always Ready	6	(0)
2020	San José		
2021	Fancesa		
2022	24 de Septiembre		
2023–2024	Universitario de Vinto	26	(1)
2024–	Ciudad Nueva Santa Cruz	5	(0)

International career^{‡}
2015	Bolivia U17	3	(0)
2017	Bolivia U20	3	(1)
2018	Bolivia U21	1	(0)
- * Club domestic league appearances and goals as of 20:49, 15 March 2025 (UTC) ‡ National team caps and goals as of 23:29, 30 October 2019 (UTC)

Ronaldo Monteiro Pedraza (born 11 January 1998) is a Bolivian football player who plays as forward for Ciudad Nueva Santa Cruz.

== Personal life ==
Monteiro was born in Bolivia, and his father Edu Monteiro is a Brazilian former footballer. His younger brother Enzo is also a footballer and a forward.
