= Andrés Arroyo (footballer) =

Colombian footballer (born 2002)

Personal information
- Full name: Andrés Juan Arroyo Romero
- Date of birth: 20 January 2002 (age 24)
- Place of birth: Montería, Colombia
- Height: 1.72 m (5 ft 8 in)
- Position: Midfielder

Team information
- Current team: Pachuca (on loan from Fortaleza)
- Number: 28

Youth career
- 2016–2019: Deportivo Cali

Senior career*
Years	Team	Apps	(Gls)
2019–2023	Deportivo Cali	79	(6)
2022	→ Jaguares de Córdoba (loan)	16	(1)
2024–2025	Iraklis	15	(4)
2024–2025	→ Deportes Tolima (loan)	28	(5)
2025–2026	Fortaleza	42	(13)
2026	→ Everton (loan)	2	(0)
2026–	→ Pachuca (loan)	1	(0)

International career^{‡}
2019	Colombia U17	4	(1)
2019	Colombia U19	1	(1)
- * Club domestic league appearances and goals as of 30 August 2026 ‡ National team caps and goals as of 18:44, 21 June 2023 (UTC)

Andrés Juan Arroyo Romero (born 20 January 2002) is a Colombian professional footballer who plays as a midfielder for Liga MX club Pachuca, on loan from Liga DIMAYOR club Fortaleza.

== Early life ==
A native of Montería, Arroyo's mother died when he was six months old. As his father lived in Canada, he was raised by his uncle and grandmother, who supported Arroyo as he played youth football, with his uncle going as far as to quit his job to help Arroyo achieve his dream.

== Club career ==
=== Deportivo Cali ===
In his youth, Arroyo featured for Italian side AC Milan in international tournaments. He joined Deportivo Cali's youth system in 2016, and would make his professional debut with the club's senior team in 2019. On 30 August of the same year, he scored his first goal for the club; having come off the bench with six minutes to go and a 1–1 scoreline in a Copa Colombia game against Atlético Junior, Arroyo scored the winning goal as Deportivo Cali went on to win 2–1.

Over the following three seasons, Arroyo struggled to fully establish himself in the Deportivo Cali first team, scoring no goals in the 2020 and 2021 Categoría Primera A seasons. For the 2022 season, he was sent on loan to fellow Categoría Primera A side Jaguares de Córdoba. Having returned to Deportivo Cali and featuring heavily in the 2023 season, Arroyo left the club in December 2023 following a mutual agreement.

=== Iraklis ===
In early January 2024, Arroyo joined Greek side Iraklis, signing a one-and-a-half-year deal.

=== Fortaleza ===
==== Everton (loan) ====
In June 2026, Arroyo was loaned out Grupo Pachuca for a year with a purchase option and joined Chilean club Everton de Viña del Mar, a club affiliated with them, for the second half of the year.

==== Pachuca (loan) ====
On 28 August 2026, Arroyo was loaned out Pachuca.

== International career ==
Arroyo has represented Colombia at under-17 and under-19 level. In October 2019, after a good debut season with his club, Deportivo Cali, he was called up to the under-20 squad for the first time.

== Career statistics ==
=== Club ===
As of 6 May 2024

Appearances and goals by club, season and competition
Club	Season	League			Cup		Continental		Other		Total	
Club	Season	Division	Apps	Goals	Apps	Goals	Apps	Goals	Apps	Goals	Apps	Goals
Deportivo Cali	2019	Categoría Primera A	17	2	6 (Note: Appearances in the Copa Colombia)	1	—		—		23	3
Deportivo Cali	2020	Categoría Primera A	12	0	—		2 (Note: Appearances in the Copa Sudamericana)	0	—		14	0
Deportivo Cali	2021	Categoría Primera A	19	0	3	1	1	0	—		23	1
Deportivo Cali	2023	Categoría Primera A	31	4	5	1	—		—		36	5
Deportivo Cali	Total		79	6	14	3	3	0	—		96	9
Jaguares de Córdoba (loan)	2022	Categoría Primera A	16	1	4	1	—		—		20	2
Iraklis	2023–24	Super League Greece 2	13	4	—		—		—		13	4
Career total			108	11	18	4	3	0	0	0	129	15
