= Pedro Arthur =

Brazilian footballer

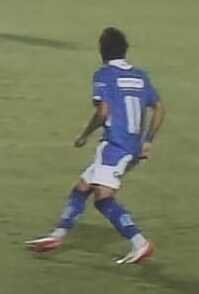
- Pedro Arthur playing for São José-SP in 2026

Personal information
- Full name: Pedro Arthur Bitencourt Machado
- Date of birth: 9 October 2002 (age 24)
- Place of birth: Caxias do Sul, Brazil
- Height: 1.72 m (5 ft 8 in)
- Position: Forward

Youth career
- Juventude
- 2018–2022: Flamengo

Senior career*
Years	Team	Apps	(Gls)
2023	Juventude	0	(0)
2023	Oeste	0	(0)
2024	Primavera	2	(0)
2024	União Frederiquense	12	(1)
2024–2025	Concórdia	0	(0)
2025	→ Metalist 1925 Kharkiv (loan)	3	(0)
2026	São José-SP	14	(1)

International career
2017	Brazil U15	2	(2)
2018	Brazil U16	3	(2)
- * Club domestic league appearances and goals as of 18:06, 8 May 2026 (UTC)

Pedro Arthur Bitencourt Machado (born 9 October 2002), known as Pedro Arthur, is a Brazilian footballer who plays as a forward.

== Club career ==
Born in Caxias do Sul, Rio Grande do Sul, Pedro Arthur began his career with hometown side Juventude before joining Flamengo in December 2017. On 13 December 2022, he returned to his previous club, now as a first team member.

After failing to make an appearance for Ju, Pedro Arthur finished the 2023 season at Oeste, and later had a short stint at Primavera before signing for União Frederiquense on 2 June 2024. On 3 September, he agreed to a deal with Concórdia for the Copa Santa Catarina.

Pedro Arthur renewed with Concórdia until 2027 on 19 November 2024, after helping the club to win the Copa Santa Catarina, and was loaned to Ukrainian side Metalist 1925 Kharkiv on 16 January 2025. He returned to his parent club on 15 August, after just three matches.

On 17 November 2025, São José-SP announced the signing of Pedro Arthur for the upcoming season.

== Career statistics ==
As of 8 May 2026.

Club	Season	League			State League		Cup		Continental		Other		Total	
Club	Season	Division	Apps	Goals	Apps	Goals	Apps	Goals	Apps	Goals	Apps	Goals	Apps	Goals
Juventude	2023	Série B	—		0	0	—		—		—		0	0
Oeste	2023	Paulista A2	—		—		—		—		7 (Note: Appearance(s) in Copa Paulista)	0	7	0
Primavera	2024	Paulista A2	—		2	0	—		—		—		2	0
União Frederiquense	2024	Gaúcho Série A2	—		12	1	—		—		—		12	1
Concórdia	2024	Série D	—		—		—		—		11 (Note: Appearance(s) in Copa Santa Catarina)	2	11	2
Concórdia	2025	Catarinense	—		—		—		—		5	4	5	4
Concórdia	Total		—		—		—		—		16	6	16	6
Metalist 1925 Kharkiv (loan)	2024–25	Ukrainian First League	3	0	—		—		—		—		3	0
São José	2026	Paulista A2	—		14	1	—		—		—		14	1
Career total			3	0	28	2	0	0	0	0	23	6	54	8
