= Pedro de la Cruz =

Peruvian footballer (born 2002)

Personal information
- Full name: Pedro Giampier de la Cruz Espinoza
- Date of birth: 15 January 2002 (age 24)
- Place of birth: Lima, Peru
- Height: 1.63 m (5 ft 4 in)
- Position: Midfielder

Team information
- Current team: Santos de Nasca (on loan from Alianza Lima)
- Number: 13

Youth career
- –2020: Alianza Lima

Senior career*
Years	Team	Apps	(Gls)
2020–	Alianza Lima	0	(0)
2020	→ Santos de Nasca (loan)	6	(0)
2021–	→ Santos de Nasca (loan)	11	(1)

International career^{‡}
2019	Peru U17	5	(0)
- * Club domestic league appearances and goals as of 05:00, 25 October 2021 (UTC) ‡ National team caps and goals as of 05:00, 25 October 2021 (UTC)

Pedro Giampier de la Cruz Espinoza (born 15 January 2002) is a Peruvian footballer who plays as a midfielder for Santos de Nasca, on loan from Alianza Lima.

== Career statistics ==
=== Club ===
As of 25 October 2021.

Club	Season	League			Cup		Continental		Other		Total	
Club	Season	Division	Apps	Goals	Apps	Goals	Apps	Goals	Apps	Goals	Apps	Goals
Alianza Lima	2020	Peruvian Primera División	0	0	0	0	0	0	0	0	0	0
Alianza Lima	2021	Peruvian Primera División	0	0	0	0	0	0	0	0	0	0
Alianza Lima	Total		0	0	0	0	0	0	0	0	0	0
Santos de Nasca (loan)	2020	Peruvian Segunda División	6	0	0	0	0	0	0	0	6	0
Santos de Nasca (loan)	2021	Peruvian Segunda División	11	1	0	0	0	0	0	0	11	1
Santos de Nasca (loan)	Total		17	1	0	0	0	0	0	0	17	1
Career total			17	1	0	0	0	0	0	0	17	1
