= Rodrigo Amaral =

Uruguayan footballer (born 1997)

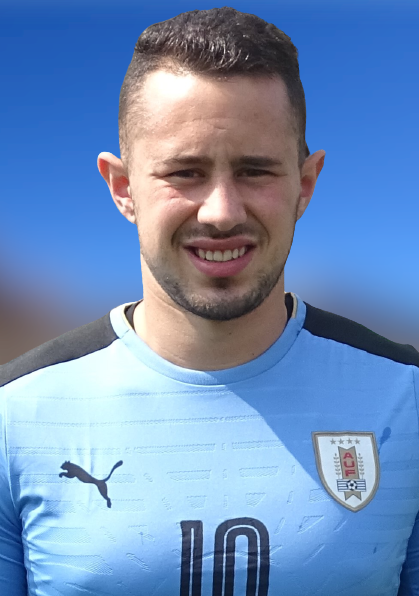

Personal information
- Full name: Rodrigo Nahuel Amaral Pereira
- Date of birth: 25 March 1997 (age 29)
- Place of birth: Montevideo, Uruguay
- Height: 1.78 m (5 ft 10 in)
- Position: Forward

Team information
- Current team: Oriente Petrolero
- Number: 70

Youth career
- Carabelas
- Nacional

Senior career*
Years	Team	Apps	(Gls)
2015–2017	Nacional	18	(1)
2017–2019	Racing Club	0	(0)
2019	→ Nacional (loan)	11	(4)
2019–2020	Nacional	13	(1)
2021	Fénix	24	(4)
2022	The Strongest	18	(5)
2022	Fénix	11	(0)
2023	Plaza Colonia	7	(1)
2023–2024	Wilstermann	42	(10)
2025	Montevideo Wanderers	7	(0)
2025–	Oriente Petrolero	12	(1)

International career
2014–2017	Uruguay U20	55	(19)
Medal record
Men's football
Representing Uruguay
South American U-20 Championship
Winner	2017 Ecuador
Third place	2015 Uruguay
- * Club domestic league appearances and goals as of 30 December 2025

Rodrigo Nahuel Amaral Pereira (born 25 March 1997) is a Uruguayan professional footballer who plays as a forward for Bolivian FBF División Profesional club Oriente Petrolero.

== Career ==
He started his career at Nacional, but left the club due to differences with management and joined Racing Club in Argentina. He later re-joined Nacional in 2019.

== Honours ==
=== Club ===
Nacional

- Uruguayan Primera División: 2014–15, 2016

=== International ===
Uruguay U20

- South American Youth Football Championship: 2017
