= Sebastián Cavero =

Peruvian footballer (born 2002)

Personal information
- Full name: Sebastián José Cavero Nakahoro
- Date of birth: 20 June 2002 (age 24)
- Place of birth: Lima, Peru
- Height: 1.75 m (5 ft 9 in)
- Position: Forward

Team information
- Current team: FBC Melgar

Youth career
- –2020: Alianza Lima

Senior career*
Years	Team	Apps	(Gls)
2020	Alianza Lima	10	(0)
2021	Alianza Universidad	21	(0)
2022	Alianza Lima	1	(0)
2022	Atlético Grau	13	(0)
2023–	FBC Melgar	0	(0)

International career^{‡}
2019	Peru U17	7	(0)
- * Club domestic league appearances and goals as of 05:00, 1 October 2020 (UTC) ‡ National team caps and goals as of 05:00, 1 October 2020 (UTC)

Sebastián José Cavero Nakahoro (born 20 June 2002) is a Peruvian footballer who plays as a forward for FBC Melgar.

== Career statistics ==
=== Club ===
As of 21 April 2024.

Club	Division	League			Cup		Continental		Total	
Club	Division	Season	Apps	Goals	Apps	Goals	Apps	Goals	Apps	Goals
Alianza Lima	Liga 1	2020	10	0	—		1	0	11	0
Alianza Lima	Liga 1	2022	1	0	—		0	0	1	0
Alianza Lima	Total		11	0	0	0	1	0	12	0
Alianza Universidad	Liga 1	2021	21	0	0	0	—		21	0
Atlético Grau	Liga 1	2022	12	0	—		—		12	0
FBC Melgar	Liga 1	2023	13	0	—		2	0	15	0
FBC Melgar	Liga 1	2024	7	0	—		1	0	8	1
FBC Melgar	Total		20	0	0	0	3	0	23	1
Career total			64	0	0	0	4	0	68	0
