= Néicer Acosta =

Ecuadorian footballer (born 2002)

Personal information
- Full name: Néicer Aldhair Acosta Méndez
- Date of birth: 21 December 2002 (age 23)
- Place of birth: Ibarra, Ecuador
- Height: 1.74 m (5 ft 9 in)
- Position: Winger

Senior career*
Years	Team	Apps	(Gls)
2020–2024	Independiente del Valle	1	(0)
2022	→ Orlando City B (loan)	11	(3)
2024	Guayaquil City		
2024–2025	Brisbane Roar	5	(0)
2025	Brusque	0	(0)
2025–2026	Al-Arabi	7	(0)

International career
2019	Ecuador U17	6	(0)
- * Club domestic league appearances and goals as of 14 May 2025

Néicer Aldhair Acosta Méndez (born 21 December 2002) is an Ecuadorian professional footballer who plays as a winger.

== Life and career ==
Acosta was born on 21 December 2002 in Ibarra and grew up in Chota. He is a nephew of Ecuador international Jhegson Méndez. He mainly operates as a left winger. He is known for his dribbling ability. He started his career with Ecuadorian side Independiente del Valle. He made one league appearance while playing for the club. He also played for their reserve team. He helped them win the U-20 Copa Libertadores.

In 2022, he was sent on loan to American side Orlando City B. He made eleven league appearances and scored three goals while playing for the club. In 2024, he signed for Ecuadorian side Guayaquil City. After that, he signed for Australian side Brisbane Roar. In February 2025, during the mid-season transfer window, he departed the club via mutual consent. He made six appearances without scoring for the Ecuador national under-17 football team.

On 19 August 2025, Acosta joined Saudi First Division League club Al-Arabi.
