= Carlos Ruiz (Peruvian footballer) =

Peruvian footballer (born 2002)

Personal information
- Full name: Carlos Alberto Ruiz Gutiérrez
- Date of birth: 25 January 2002 (age 24)
- Place of birth: Iquitos, Peru
- Height: 1.75 m (5 ft 9 in)
- Position: Forward

Team information
- Current team: UTC (on loan from Sporting Cristal)
- Number: 13

Youth career
- –2020: Sporting Cristal

Senior career*
| Years | Team | Apps | (Gls) |
| 2020– | Sporting Cristal | 0 | (0) |
| 2020– | → UTC (loan) | 1 | (0) |

International career^{‡}
| 2019 | Peru U17 | 2 | (0) |
| 2022– | Peru U23 | 1 | (0) |
- * Club domestic league appearances and goals as of 05:00, 1 October 2020 (UTC) ‡ National team caps and goals as of 05:00, 1 September 2022 (UTC)

Carlos Alberto Ruiz Gutiérrez (born 25 January 2002) is a Peruvian footballer who plays as a forward for UTC, on loan from Sporting Cristal.

== Career statistics ==
=== Club ===
As of 1 October 2020.

| Club | Season | League | | | Cup | | Continental | | Other | | Total | |
| Club | Season | Division | Apps | Goals | Apps | Goals | Apps | Goals | Apps | Goals | Apps | Goals |
|---|---|---|---|---|---|---|---|---|---|---|---|---|
| Sporting Cristal | 2020 | Liga 1 | 0 | 0 | 0 | 0 | 0 | 0 | 0 | 0 | 0 | 0 |
| UTC (loan) | 2020 | Liga 1 | 1 | 0 | 0 | 0 | 0 | 0 | 0 | 0 | 1 | 0 |
| Career total | | | 1 | 0 | 0 | 0 | 0 | 0 | 0 | 0 | 1 | 0 |
