= 2022 River Plate Montevideo season =

River Plate
2022 season
- President: Willie Tucci
- Head coach: Gustavo Díaz (since January)
- Stadium: Estadio Saroldi
- Uruguayan Primera División: ?
- Top goalscorer: League: ? All: ?
Home colours	Away colours	Third colours

River Plate is taking part in Uruguayan Primera División and took part in 2022 Copa Sudamericana, reaching group stage.

== Transfer Window ==
=== Summer 2022 ===
==== In ====
Position	Nationality	Name	Age	From	Fee	Transfer Window	Ref.
DF	(Uruguay)	Horacio Salaberry	34	(Ecuador) Guayaquil City	Return from loan	Summer	Tenfield
MF	(Uruguay)	Matías Alfonso	21	Cerro	Loan	Summer	Tenfield
MF	(Italy)	Nicolás Fonseca	23	(Italy) Novara	Free agent	Summer	Tenfield
DF	(Uruguay)	Agustín Chopitea	22	Cerro	Loan	Summer	Tenfield
DF	(Uruguay)	Maximiliano Pereira	37	Peñarol	Free agent	Summer	El Pueblo
FW	(Uruguay)	Nicolás Sosa	25	(Mexico) Querétaro	Free agent	Summer	SoyFiera.com
FW	(Uruguay)	Juan de los Santos	19	-	Reserves	Summer	Tenfield
GK	(Uruguay)	José Arbío	19	-	Reserves	Summer	Tenfield
MF	(Uruguay)	Valentín Adamo	19	-	Reserves	Summer	Tenfield
FW	(Uruguay)	Pablo López	25	Defensor Sporting	Loan	Summer	Tenfield
MF	(Uruguay)	Matías Ocampo	19	Defensor Sporting	Loan	Summer	Tenfield
DF	(Argentina)	Roque Ramírez	22	(Argentina) Atlético Rafaela	Loan	Summer	Tenfield
MF	(Uruguay)	Jonathan Urretavizcaya	31	Rentistas	Free agent	Summer	Tenfield
DF	(Uruguay)	José Aja	28	(Chile) Santiago Wanderers	Free agent	Summer	Diarioceleste
DF	(Paraguay)	Walter Clar	27	(Paraguay) Nacional	Free agent	Summer	ABC

==== Out ====
Position	Nationality	Name	Age	To	Fee	Transfer Window	Ref.
GK	(Uruguay)	Lucas Machado	23	Rentistas	Free agent	Summer	Tenfield
MF	(Uruguay)	Luciano Boggio	22	Defensor Sporting	End of loan	Summer	Tenfield
DF	(Uruguay)	Felipe Carvalho	28	Boston River	Free Agent	Summer	El Observador
MF	(Uruguay)	Pablo García	22	(Brazil) Coritiba	End of loan	Summer	Coritiba.com.br
MF	(Uruguay)	Patricio Gregorio	22	Nacional	End of loan	Summer	Tenfield
MF	(Uruguay)	Facundo Boné	26	(Colombia) Pasto	Free Agent	Summer	El Tiempo
MF	(Uruguay)	Nicolás Rodríguez	30	Danubio	Free Agent	Summer	Tenfield
MF	(Uruguay)	Diego Vicente	23	Danubio	Loan	Summer	Tenfield
FW	(Uruguay)	José Neris	21	Albion	Loan	Summer	Tenfield
FW	(Uruguay)	Matías Arezo	19	(Spain) Granada	Transfer	Summer	Ovacion
DF	(Uruguay)	Facundo Bonifazi	26	Peñarol	Contract terminated	Summer	Ovacion
MF	(Uruguay)	Juan Ignacio Quintana	22	La Luz	Loan	Summer	Tenfield
MF	(Uruguay)	Facundo Vigo	22	Juventud	Loan	Summer	Tenfield

=== Winter 2022 ===
==== In ====
Position	Nationality	Name	Age	From	Fee	Transfer Window	Ref.
MF	(Uruguay)	Ramiro Cristóbal	26	(Argentina) Atlético Rafaela	Free transfer	Winter	Tenfield
DF	(Uruguay)	Gonzalo Viera	35	Atenas	Free transfer	Winter	Tenfield
FW	(Uruguay)	Tiziano Correa	17	Reserves	-	Winter	Tenfield
MF	(Uruguay)	Agustín Vera	18	Reserves	-	Winter	Tenfield
FW	(Uruguay)	Inti López	17	Reserves	-	Winter	Tenfield

==== Out ====
Position	Nationality	Name	Age	To	Fee	Transfer Window	Ref.
DF	(Uruguay)	José Aja	29	(Colombia) Santa Fe	Free agent	Winter	AS
MF	(Italy)	Nicolás Fonseca	23	Wanderers	Free agent	Winter	Ovación
FW	(Uruguay)	Adrián Leites	30	Cerrito	Free agent	Winter	Tenfield
DW	(Uruguay)	Santiago Pérez	23	Villa Española	Free agent	Winter	Tenfield
MF	(Uruguay)	Juan Pablo Plada	23	Deportivo Maldonado	Free agent	Winter	Tenfield
MF	(Uruguay)	Pablo González	27	-	End of contract	Winter	Tenfield

== Squad ==
=== First team squad ===
As of Oct 8, 2022

Note: Flags indicate national team as defined under FIFA eligibility rules; some limited exceptions apply. Players may hold more than one non-FIFA nationality.

No.	Pos.	Nation	Player
1	GK	URU	Salvador Ichazo
2	DF	URU	Fabricio Vidal
3	DF	URU	Santiago Brunelli
4	DF	URU	Horacio Salaberry
5	MF	URU	Tiago Galletto
6	MF	URU	Matías Alfonso
7	MF	URU	Matías Ocampo
8	MF	URU	Ramiro Cristóbal
9	FW	URU	Thiago Borbas
10	MF	URU	Gonzalo Nápoli
11	MF	URU	Gonzalo Castro
12	GK	URU	Santiago Acosta
13	DF	URU	Gonzalo Viera
14	DF	URU	Pablo López
15	DF	ARG	Roque Ramírez
16	DF	URU	Maxi Pereira
17	MF	URU	Marcos Montiel
18	FW	URU	Mauricio Affonso
19	FW	URU	Joaquín Lavega
20	DF	URU	Agustín Chopitea
21	FW	URU	Jonathan Urretavizcaya

No.	Pos.	Nation	Player
22	DF	URU	Guillermo Oroño
23	FW	URU	Nicolás Sosa
24	MF	URU	Lorenzo González
25	GK	URU	Fabrizio Correa
26	DF	URU	Robert Herrera
27	FW	URU	Emiliano Fernández
28	FW	URU	Nahuel Albano
29	FW	URU	Franco Zanoni
30	DF	URU	Cristhian Pérez
31	FW	URU	Juan Cruz de los Santos
32	FW	URU	Valentín Adamo
33	MF	URU	Ihojan Pérez
34	FW	URU	Tiziano Correa
35	FW	URU	Inti López
36	MF	URU	Agustín Vera
37	DF	PAR	Walter Clar
38	GK	URU	José Arbio
39	MF	URU	Lucas Camejo
40	MF	URU	Guillermo Gandolfo
41	FW	URU	Luciano Tiscornia

=== Top scorers ===
Last updated on Oct 8, 2022

Rank	Pos.	No.	Name	Primera División	Copa Uruguay	Copa Sudamericana	Total
1	FW	9	(Uruguay) Thiago Borbas	18	0	1	19
2	MF	7	(Uruguay) Matías Ocampo	7	0	0	7
3	FW	23	(Uruguay) Nicolás Sosa	3	0	2	5
4	MF	17	(Uruguay) Pablo López	3	0	1	4
5	DF	4	(Uruguay) Horacio Salaberry	1	0	2	3
5	FW	11	(Uruguay) Gonzalo Castro	3	0	0	3
5	FW	31	(Uruguay) Juan Cruz de los Santos	3	0	0	3
5	DF	37	(Paraguay) Walter Clar	1	1	1	3
6	DF	13	(Uruguay) Agustín Chopitea	1	1	0	2
6	MF	14	(Uruguay) Marcos Montiel	2	0	0	2
6	FW	19	(Uruguay) Joaquín Lavega	1	0	1	2
6	FW	32	(Uruguay) Valentín Adamo	2	0	0	2
7	DF	2	(Uruguay) José Aja	1	0	0	1
7	MF	5	(Uruguay) Tiago Galletto	1	0	0	1
7	FW	18	(Uruguay) Mauricio Affonso	1	0	0	1
7	FW	21	(Uruguay) Jonathan Urretavizcaya	1	0	0	1
-	-	-	O.G.	4	0	0	4
Total				52	2	8	62

=== Disciplinary record ===
Last updated on Oct 11, 2022

No.	Pos	Nat	Name	Primera División			Copa Uruguay			Copa Sudamericana			Total		
No.	Pos	Nat	Name	Yellow card	(yellow card) (yellow-red card)	Red card	Yellow card	(yellow card) (yellow-red card)	Red card	Yellow card	(yellow card) (yellow-red card)	Red card	Yellow card	(yellow card) (yellow-red card)	Red card
Goalkeepers
1	GK	(Uruguay)	Salvador Ichazo	4	0	0	0	0	0	1	0	0	5	0	0
12	GK	(Uruguay)	Santiago Acosta	0	0	0	0	0	0	0	0	0	0	0	0
25	GK	(Uruguay)	Fabrizio Correa	0	0	0	0	0	1	0	0	0	0	0	1
38	GK	(Uruguay)	José Arbio	0	0	0	0	0	0	0	0	0	0	0	0
Defenders
2	DF	(Uruguay)	Fabricio Vidal	0	0	0	1	0	0	0	0	0	1	0	0
3	DF	(Uruguay)	Santiago Brunelli	3	0	0	0	0	0	0	0	0	3	0	0
4	DF	(Uruguay)	Horacio Salaberry	10	2	0	0	0	0	3	0	0	13	2	0
13	DF	(Uruguay)	Gonzalo Viera	1	0	0	0	0	0	0	0	0	1	0	0
15	DF	(Argentina)	Roque Ramírez	2	0	0	0	0	0	0	0	0	2	0	0
16	DF	(Uruguay)	Maximiliano Pereira	13	0	0	0	0	0	2	0	0	15	0	0
20	DF	(Uruguay)	Agustín Chopitea	1	0	0	0	0	0	0	0	0	1	0	0
22	DF	(Uruguay)	Guillermo Oroño	0	0	0	0	0	0	0	0	0	0	0	0
26	DF	(Uruguay)	Robert Herrera	1	0	0	0	0	0	1	0	0	1	0	0
30	DF	(Uruguay)	Cristhian Pérez	0	0	0	0	0	0	0	0	0	0	0	0
37	DF	(Paraguay)	Walter Clar	1	0	0	0	0	0	2	0	0	3	0	0
Midfielders
5	MF	(Uruguay)	Tiago Galletto	1	0	0	1	0	0	1	0	0	3	0	0
6	MF	(Uruguay)	Matías Alfonso	11	0	0	0	0	1	3	0	0	14	0	1
7	MF	(Uruguay)	Matías Ocampo	5	0	0	0	0	0	1	0	0	6	0	0
8	MF	(Uruguay)	Ramiro Cristóbal	1	0	0	0	0	0	0	0	0	1	0	0
10	MF	(Uruguay)	Gonzalo Nápoli	3	0	0	0	0	0	1	0	0	4	0	0
11	MF	(Uruguay)	Gonzalo Castro	1	0	1	0	0	0	1	0	0	2	0	1
14	MF	(Uruguay)	Pablo López	2	0	0	0	0	0	0	0	0	2	0	0
17	MF	(Uruguay)	Marcos Montiel	12	1	0	0	0	0	1	1	0	13	2	0
24	MF	(Uruguay)	Lorenzo González	0	0	0	0	0	0	0	0	0	0	0	0
33	MF	(Uruguay)	Ihojan Pérez	0	0	0	0	0	0	0	0	0	0	0	0
36	MF	(Uruguay)	Agustín Vera	0	0	0	2	0	0	0	0	0	2	0	0
39	MF	(Uruguay)	Lucas Camejo	0	0	0	0	0	0	0	0	0	0	0	0
40	MF	(Uruguay)	Guillermo Gandolfo	0	0	0	0	0	0	0	0	0	0	0	0
Forwards
9	FW	(Uruguay)	Thiago Borbas	8	0	0	0	0	0	2	0	0	10	0	0
18	FW	(Uruguay)	Mauricio Affonso	1	0	0	0	0	0	0	0	0	1	0	0
19	FW	(Uruguay)	Joaquín Lavega	2	0	0	0	0	0	0	0	0	2	0	0
21	FW	(Uruguay)	Jonathan Urretavizcaya	3	0	0	0	0	0	0	0	0	3	0	0
23	FW	(Uruguay)	Nicolás Sosa	4	0	0	0	0	0	2	0	0	6	0	0
27	FW	(Uruguay)	Emiliano Fernández	0	0	0	0	0	0	0	0	0	0	0	0
28	FW	(Uruguay)	Nahuel Albano	0	0	0	0	0	0	0	0	0	0	0	0
29	FW	(Uruguay)	Franzo Zanoni	0	0	0	0	0	0	0	0	0	0	0	0
31	FW	(Uruguay)	Juan Cruz de los Santos	2	0	0	1	0	0	0	0	0	3	0	0
32	FW	(Uruguay)	Valentín Adamo	0	0	0	0	0	0	0	0	0	0	0	0
34	FW	(Uruguay)	Inti López	0	0	0	0	0	0	0	0	0	0	0	0
41	FW	(Uruguay)	Luciano Tiscornia	0	0	0	0	0	0	0	0	0	0	0	0
Players transferred out during the season
	DF	(Uruguay)	José Aja	2	0	0	0	0	0	1	0	0	3	0	0
	MF	(Italy)	Nicolás Fonseca	0	0	0	0	0	0	1	0	0	1	0	0
	DF	(Uruguay)	Santiago Pérez	0	0	0	0	0	0	0	0	0	0	0	0
	FW	(Uruguay)	Adrián Leites	0	0	0	0	0	0	0	0	0	0	0	0
	MF	(Uruguay)	Pablo González	0	0	0	0	0	0	0	0	0	0	0	0
	MF	(Uruguay)	Juan Pablo Plada	0	0	0	0	0	0	0	0	0	0	0	0
Total				94	3	1	5	0	2	23	1	0	122	4	3

== Primera División ==
=== Apertura 2022 ===
==== League table ====
Pos	Team	Pld	W	D	L	GF	GA	GD	Pts	Qualification
1	Liverpool	15	10	2	3	21	8	+13	32	Qualification for Championship playoff
2	Nacional	15	8	4	3	28	10	+18	28	
3	Deportivo Maldonado	15	8	3	4	20	14	+6	27	
4	Boston River	15	8	3	4	20	16	+4	27	
5	Peñarol	15	7	5	3	10	6	+4	26	
6	Danubio	15	6	6	3	13	9	+4	24	
7	Fénix	15	7	2	6	15	16	−1	23	
8	River Plate	15	5	6	4	20	15	+5	21	
9	Montevideo Wanderers	15	5	6	4	16	11	+5	21	
10	Defensor Sporting	15	5	5	5	14	16	−2	20	
11	Rentistas (Note: Rentistas were awarded three points and Cerrito were deducted three points due to Cerrito fielding the ineligible player Franco Martínez during the match between both teams.)	15	5	1	9	16	21	−5	19	
12	Plaza Colonia	15	2	7	6	12	15	−3	13	
13	Montevideo City Torque	15	2	7	6	16	20	−4	13	
14	Cerro Largo	15	3	3	9	7	23	−16	12	
15	Albion	15	2	5	8	16	31	−15	11	
16	Cerrito	15	2	5	8	9	22	−13	8	

Source: AUF, Soccerway
Rules for classification: 1) Points, 2) Playoff game, in case two teams are tied for first place.
If there are more than two teams tied in points: 2) Goal difference, 3) Goals for, 4) Head-to-head record, 5) Drawing of lots, 6) Playoff game, in case two teams are still tied for first place.

==== Results by round ====
Round	1	2	3	4	5	6	7	8	9	10	11	12	13	14	15
Ground	H	A	H	H	H	H	A	H	A	H	A	H	A	H	A
Result	D	W	L	W	D	W	L	W	D	D	L	W	L	D	D
Position	6	4	10	6	5	4	5	2	4	6	8	6	8	9	8

A = Away; H = Home; W = Win; D = Draw; L = Loss

==== Matches ====
Feb 7, 2022 1	River Plate	1-1	Wanderers	Montevideo
17:00 UTC−3	Borbas 20'; Salaberry (yellow card) 51'; Ocampo (yellow card) 72'; Ichazo (yellow card) 74'; Sosa (yellow card) 80'; Montiel (yellow card) 86'	Report	Rivero 73'; Bravo (yellow card) 48'; Rolón (yellow card) 53'; Aguirre (yellow card) 57'; García (yellow card) 59'; Hernández (red card) 88'	Stadium: Saroldi; Referee: Esteban Ostojich

Feb 12, 2022 2	Plaza Colonia	0-1	River Plate	Colonia
21:00 UTC−3	Diblle (yellow card) 11'; Vitão (yellow card) 43' (yellow-red card) 81'; Heredia (yellow card) 79'	Report	Montiel 67'; Nápoli (yellow card) 16'; Chopitea (yellow card) 55'; Pereira (yellow card) 77'; López (yellow card) 90+3'	Stadium: Prandi; Referee: Christian Ferreyra

Feb 19, 2022 3	River Plate	1-2	Boston River	Montevideo
9:30 UTC−3	López 72'; Salaberry (yellow card) 28'; Ramírez (yellow card) 44'; Montiel (yellow card) 71'; Borbas (yellow card) 83'; Ichazo (yellow card) 89'	Report	A. Rodríguez 49'; Viega 90+3'; G. Rodríguez (yellow card) 28'; Alberti (yellow card) 40'; Silva (yellow card) 77'; Valdez (yellow card) 87'	Stadium: Saroldi; Referee: Diego Riveiro

Feb 28, 2022 4	River Plate	3-1	Cerrito	Montevideo
17:00 UTC−3	Vega 31' (o.g.); Ocampo 38'; Galletto 83'; Salaberry (yellow card) 4'; Sosa (yellow card) 19'; Nápoli (yellow card) 34'; Pereira (yellow card) 68'; Ramírez (yellow card) 71'; Montiel (yellow card) 84'	Report	González 20'; Calzada (yellow card) 66'; Vila (yellow card) 68'; Perujo (yellow card) 82'	Stadium: Saroldi; Referee: Andrés Matonte

Mar 5, 2022 5	River Plate	1-1	Cerro Largo	Montevideo
9:30 UTC−3	Salaberry 26'; Borbas (yellow card) 39'; Urretavizcaya (yellow card) 58'; Brunelli (yellow card) 90+1'	Report	Max 53' (yellow card) 53' (yellow-red card) 56'; Gianoli (yellow card) 45+3'; García (yellow card) 56'	Stadium: Saroldi; Referee: Jonathan Fuentes

Mar 20, 2022 61	River Plate	3-1	Fénix	Montevideo
16:30 UTC−3	Borbas 40'; Toledo 51' (o.g.); Castro 90+5'; López (yellow card) 17'; Salaberry (yellow card) 69'; Sosa (yellow card) 90+3'	Report	Casas 76'; Schetino (yellow card) 13' (red card) 84'; Vega (yellow card) 27'; R. Fernández (yellow card) 61'	Stadium: Saroldi; Referee: Santiago Motta

1: Fifth round was suspended due to complaints of AUDAF on violence situations suffered by referees. .

Apr 2, 2022 72	Defensor Sporting	3-2	River Plate	Montevideo
21:00 UTC−3	Sant'Anna 7'; Méndez 43'; Navarro 50' (pen.); Rocha (yellow card) 29' (yellow-red card) 77'; L. de los Santos (yellow card) 85'; Barrios (yellow card) 90+5'	Report	Borbas 69' (pen.); Sosa 79' (pen.); Salaberry (yellow card) 22'	Stadium: Franzini; Referee: Mathías de Armas

2: Seventh round was postponed due to March 27 Referendum. .

Apr 10, 2022 8	River Plate	4-1	Albion	Montevideo
16:00 UTC−3	Chopitea 1'; Aja 7' (yellow card) 31'; Sosa 77' 85'; Ocampo (yellow card) 33'	Report	Ndong 11' (yellow card) 39'; Platero (yellow card) 17' (yellow-red card) 19'; Callorda (yellow card) 20'; Ancheta (yellow card) 33'; S. Correa (red card) 75'	Stadium: Saroldi; Referee: Diego Riveiro

Apr 17, 2022 9	Nacional	1-1	River Plate	Montevideo
18:00 UTC−3	Ocampo 90'; Cándido (yellow card) 74' (yellow-red card) 81'; Fagúndez (yellow card) 81'; Rochet (yellow card) 82'; Y. Rodríguez (yellow card) 86'; Otormín (yellow card) 90+4'	Report	Castro 12'; Alfonso (yellow card) 7'; Montiel (yellow card) 41'; Salaberry (yellow card) 45+1' (yellow-red card) 66'; Pereira (yellow card) 49'	Stadium: GPC; Referee: José Burgos

Apr 23, 2022 10	River Plate	0-0	Danubio	Montevideo
16:00 UTC−3	Montiel (yellow card) 44'; Pereira (yellow card) 74'; Galletto (yellow card) 83'; Aja (yellow card) 90+3'	Report	Olivera (yellow card) 50'; May (yellow card) 63'; Vicente (yellow card) 73'; Conde (yellow card) 75'	Stadium: Saroldi; Referee: Gustavo Tejera

May 7, 2022 11	Deportivo Maldonado	2-1	River Plate	Maldonado
18:00 UTC−3	Anselmo 80' 87'; Tealde (yellow card) 34'; Varela (yellow card) 49'	Report	Ocampo 26'; Ichazo (yellow card) 89'	Stadium: Campus; Referee: Andrés Matonte

May 13, 2022 12	River Plate	1-0	Rentistas	Montevideo
15:00 UTC−3	Borbas 23'; Salaberry (yellow card) 62'; Alfonso (yellow card) 79'; Lavega (yellow card) 85'; Pereira (yellow card) 90'	Report	Rizzo (yellow card) 48'; Acevedo (yellow card) 77' (yellow-red card) 88'; Hernández (yellow card) 84'	Stadium: Saroldi; Referee: Andrés Cunha

May 22, 2022 13	Liverpool	2-1	River Plate	Montevideo
13:00 UTC−3	Rivero 5'; Medina 81'; Romero (yellow card) 37'; Díaz (yellow card) 45'; Carneiro (yellow card) 62'; Pereira (yellow card) 90+2'	Report	Castro 83'; Alfonso (yellow card) 56'; Montiel (yellow card) 73'; Salaberry (yellow card) 78'; Affonso (yellow card) 90+1'	Stadium: Belvedere; Referee: Leodán González

May 29, 2022 14	River Plate	0-0	Peñarol	Montevideo
15:00 UTC−3	Pereira (yellow card) 14'; Montiel (yellow card) 16'; Brunelli (yellow card) 63'; Alfonso (yellow card) 69'	Report	Musto (yellow card) 27'; Carrizo (yellow card) 64'; Menosse (yellow card) 90'	Stadium: Saroldi; Referee: José Burgos

Jun 3, 2022 15	Montevideo City Torque	0-0	River Plate	Montevideo
19:15 UTC−3	Catarozzi (yellow card) 19'; Allende (yellow card) 45+2'	Report	Castro (red card) 36'; Alfonso (yellow card) 57'	Stadium: Centenario; Referee: Nicolás Vignolo

=== Intermedio 2022 ===
==== League table ====
Pos	Team	Pld	W	D	L	GF	GA	GD	Pts	Qualification
1	Nacional	7	6	1	0	15	1	+14	19	Advance to Torneo Intermedio Final
2	Boston River	7	4	1	2	8	5	+3	13	
3	Defensor Sporting	7	4	1	2	10	8	+2	13	
4	River Plate	7	2	3	2	7	6	+1	9	
5	Cerro Largo	7	2	3	2	4	4	0	9	
6	Plaza Colonia	7	2	2	3	6	7	−1	8	
7	Danubio	7	2	1	4	6	9	−3	7	
8	Cerrito	7	0	0	7	1	17	−16	0	

Source: AUF, Soccerway
Rules for classification: 1) Points, 2) Goal difference, 3) Goals for, 4) Head-to-head record, 5) Drawing of lots, 6) Playoff game, in case two teams are tied for first place.

==== Results by round ====
Round	1	2	3	4	5	6	7
Ground	H	A	H	A	A	H	A
Result	W	L	L	W	D	D	D
Position	1	4	5	5	5	4	4

A = Away; H = Home; W = Win; D = Draw; L = Loss

==== Matches ====
Jun 10, 2022 1	River Plate	3-0	Cerrito	Montevideo
15:00 UTC−3	Adamo 23' 46'; Affonso 71'; Clar (yellow card) 33'; Pereira (yellow card) 40'	Report	Perujo (yellow card) 51'; Villoldo (yellow card) 85'; D. González (yellow card) 90+5'	Stadium: Saroldi; Referee: Diego Riveiro

Jun 18, 2022 2	Nacional	3-0	River Plate	Montevideo
18:00 UTC−3	Gigliotti 26'; Zabala 57'; Lozano 80'; Cándido (yellow card) 66' (yellow-red card) 68'; Coelho (yellow card) 84'	Report	Nápoli (yellow card) 8'; Brunelli (yellow card) 30'; Pereira (yellow card) 63'; Ichazo (yellow card) 64'	Stadium: GPC; Referee: Leodán González

Jun 26, 2022 3	River Plate	0-1	Boston River	Montevideo
10:00 UTC−3	Salaberry (yellow card) 26' (yellow-red card) 75'; Pereira (yellow card) 45+1' de los Santos (yellow card) 63'	Report	A. Rodríguez 43'	Stadium: Saroldi; Referee: Andrés Matonte

Jul 10, 2022 4	Danubio	1-3	River Plate	Montevideo
12:00 UTC−3	S. Fernández 10'; F. González (yellow card) 51'; Sosa (yellow card) 52'; Hernández (yellow card) 59' (yellow-red card) 86'; Vicente (yellow card) 67'	Report	Borbas 38' 43'; Ocampo 59' (yellow card) 71'; Castro (yellow card) 76' de los Santos (yellow card) 90+2'	Stadium: Jardines; Referee: Diego Riveiro

Jul 15, 2022 5	Plaza Colonia	0-0	River Plate	Colonia
19:00 UTC−3	A. Pérez (yellow card) 21'	Report	Montiel (yellow card) 15'; Alfonso (yellow card) 49'; Herrera (yellow card) 89'	Stadium: Prandi; Referee: Gustavo Tejera

Jul 21, 2022 6	River Plate	1-1	Defensor Sporting	Montevideo
15:00 UTC−3	Borbas 83'; Alfonso (yellow card) 22'; Montiel (yellow card) 81' (yellow-red card) 85'; Urretavizcaya (yellow card) 89'	Report	Balboa 57'; Rocha (yellow card) 30'; Ferrari (yellow card) 42'; Camargo (yellow card) 54'; Sant'Anna (yellow card) 76'; Bernal (yellow card) 81'	Stadium: Saroldi; Referee: Andrés Cunha

Jul 25, 2022 7	Cerro Largo	0-0	River Plate	Melo
19:00 UTC−3	Romero (yellow card) 57'; Enrique (yellow card) 58'; Max (yellow card) 84'	Report	Alfonso (yellow card) 41'; Borbas (yellow card) 58'; Lavega (yellow card) 72'	Stadium: Ubilla; Referee: Esteban Ostojich

=== Clausura 2022 ===
==== League table ====
Pos	Team	Pld	W	D	L	GF	GA	GD	Pts	Qualification
1	River Plate	12	8	2	2	26	9	+17	26	Qualification for Championship playoff
2	Nacional	12	7	4	1	21	8	+13	25	
3	Defensor Sporting	12	7	2	3	15	8	+7	23	
4	Deportivo Maldonado	12	6	5	1	15	10	+5	23	
5	Danubio	12	5	6	1	15	7	+8	21	
6	Liverpool	12	5	4	3	18	12	+6	19	
7	Peñarol	12	5	3	4	16	13	+3	18	
8	Albion	12	4	4	4	10	12	−2	16	
9	Cerro Largo	12	4	4	4	9	14	−5	16	
10	Boston River	12	4	3	5	15	12	+3	15	
11	Fénix	12	3	5	4	10	10	0	14	
12	Plaza Colonia	12	4	2	6	9	13	−4	14	
13	Montevideo City Torque	12	3	1	8	9	20	−11	10	
14	Montevideo Wanderers	12	2	3	7	6	15	−9	9	
15	Rentistas	12	2	1	9	11	24	−13	7	
16	Cerrito	12	1	3	8	5	23	−18	6	

Updated to match(es) played on 9 October 2022. Source: AUF, Soccerway
Rules for classification: 1) Points, 2) Playoff game, in case two teams are tied for first place.
If there are more than two teams tied in points: 2) Goal difference, 3) Goals for, 4) Head-to-head record, 5) Drawing of lots, 6) Playoff game, in case two teams are still tied for first place.

==== Results by round ====
Round	1	2	3	4	5	6	7	8	9	10	11	12	13	14	15
Ground	A	H	A	A	A	A	H	A	H	A	H	A	H		
Result	W	W	W	W	W	W	L	W	D	L	D	W			
Position	5	1	1	1	1	1	1	1	1	2	2	1			

A = Away; H = Home; W = Win; D = Draw; L = Loss

==== Matches ====
Jul 31, 2022 1	Wanderers	1-2	River Plate	Montevideo
17:30 UTC−3	Santurio 17' (yellow card) 19'; E. García (yellow card) 15'; Rolón (yellow card) 58'; Tellechea (yellow card) 63'; Bravo (yellow card) 90+8'	Report	Borbas 60' 77' (yellow card) 28'; Salaberry (yellow card) 13'; Alfonso (yellow card) 61'; Urretavizcaya (yellow card) 90+9'	Stadium: Viera; Referee: José Burgos

Ago 6, 2022 2	River Plate	2-0	Plaza Colonia	Montevideo
12:30 UTC−3	Borbas 23' (yellow card) 27'; Urretavizcaya 54'; Pereira (yellow card) 17'	Report	Bogado (yellow card) 32' (yellow-red card) 90+4'; Greising (yellow card) 56'; Ayala (yellow card) 61'	Stadium: Saroldi; Referee: Diego Riveiro

Ago 12, 2022 3	Boston River	1-2	River Plate	Montevideo
16:30 UTC−3	A. Rodríguez 45+2'; Viega (yellow card) 32'; F. Rodríguez (yellow card) 52'; Costa (yellow card) 54'; Pérez (yellow card) 89'; Corbo (yellow card) 90+4'	Report	Lavega 75'; Ocampo 89'; Salaberry (yellow card) 59'	Stadium: Capurro; Referee: Diego Dunajec

Ago 20, 2022 63	Fénix	1-2	River Plate	Montevideo
15:00 UTC−3	Vega 44'; I. Pereira (yellow card) 26'; Álvez (yellow card) 62'; Schetino (yellow card) 76'	Report	Borbas 12' de los Santos 90+4'; Alfonso (yellow card) 56'; Montiel (yellow card) 89'	Stadium: Capurro; Referee: Andrés Matonte

3: Fourth and sixth rounds were swapped.

Ago 29, 2022 5	Cerro Largo	0-5	River Plate	Melo
18:00 UTC−3	Gianoli (yellow card) 64'; Tizón (yellow card) 70'; N. Silva (yellow card) 90+1'	Report	Borbas 7' (yellow card) 52'; López 18'; Ocampo 45+1' de los Santos 73'; Ergas 88' (o.g.); Montiel (yellow card) 50'	Stadium: Ubilla; Referee: Andrés Cunha

Sep 5, 2022 4	Cerrito	1-5	River Plate	Montevideo
13:15 UTC−3	Klingender 3'; Canosa (yellow card) 53'; Velázquez (yellow card) 90+1'	Report	López 11'; Canosa 28' (o.g.); Borbas 57' 90' de los Santos 75'; Pereira (yellow card) 36'	Stadium: Palermo; Referee: Christian Ferreyra

Sep 11, 2022 7	River Plate	0-1	Defensor Sporting	Montevideo
10:00 UTC−3	Montiel (yellow card) 32'; Viera (yellow card) 45+4'; Sosa (yellow card) 45+5'; Alfonso (yellow card) 87'	Report	Balboa 41' (yellow card) 41'; Freitas (yellow card) 18'; Sant'Anna (yellow card) 45+2'; Camargo (yellow card) 46' (yellow-red card) 90+3'; Rossi (yellow card) 90+5'	Stadium: Saroldi; Referee: Esteban Ostojich

Sep 14, 2022 8	Albion	0-2	River Plate	Montevideo
15:30 UTC−3	Ndong (yellow card) 73'; Ibáñez (yellow card) 87'; Platero (yellow card) 90+5'	Report	Borbas 50' (yellow card) 42'; Montiel 65'; Ocampo (yellow card) 17'; Cristóbal (yellow card) 52'	Stadium: Jardines; Referee: Leodán González

Sep 17, 2022 9	River Plate	1-1	Nacional	Montevideo
16:00 UTC−3	Borbas 67'; Pereira (yellow card) 25'; Salaberry (yellow card) 43'	Report	Laborda 54' (yellow card) 90+1'; Coelho (yellow card) 17'	Stadium: Saroldi; Referee: Christian Ferreyra

Sep 24, 2022 10	Danubio	3-0	River Plate	Montevideo
16:00 UTC−3	May 32'; Silva 35'; Olivera 80'	Report	Borbas (yellow card) 41'	Stadium: Jardines; Referee: Andrés Cunha

Oct 2, 2022 11	River Plate	0-0	Deportivo Maldonado	Montevideo
11:00 UTC−3	Montiel (yellow card) 82'	Report	Varela (yellow card) 31'; Mir (yellow card) 48'; Núñez (yellow card) 73'; Rodríguez (yellow card) 84'	Stadium: Saroldi; Referee: Andrés Matonte

Oct 8, 2022 12	Rentistas	0-5	River Plate	Montevideo
11:00 UTC−3	Rolín (yellow card) 12'; Buschiazzo (yellow card) 23'; Godoy (yellow card) 27'	Report	Borbas 26' (pen.) 73'; Ocampo 40' 70' (yellow card) 34'; Clar 90+2'; Pereira (yellow card) 35'	Stadium: Perrone; Referee: Diego Riveiro

Oct 13, 2022 13	River Plate	-	Liverpool	Montevideo
15:00 UTC−3	-	Report	-	Stadium: Saroldi; Referee: -

=== Overall ===
==== League table ====
Pos	Team	Pld	W	D	L	GF	GA	GD	Pts	Qualification
1	Nacional (T)	34	21	9	4	64	19	+45	72	Qualification for Championship playoff and Copa Libertadores group stage
2	Liverpool (T)	34	19	8	7	50	26	+24	65	Qualification for Copa Libertadores second stage
3	River Plate (X)	34	15	11	8	53	30	+23	56	Qualification for Copa Libertadores first stage
4	Deportivo Maldonado (X)	34	15	11	8	43	36	+7	56	Qualification for Copa Sudamericana first stage
5	Defensor Sporting (X)	34	16	8	10	39	32	+7	56	Qualification for Copa Sudamericana first stage
6	Peñarol	34	15	10	9	38	27	+11	55	Qualification for Copa Sudamericana first stage
7	Boston River	34	16	7	11	43	33	+10	55	
8	Danubio	34	13	13	8	34	25	+9	52	
9	Fénix	34	12	10	12	29	31	−2	46	
10	Montevideo Wanderers	34	11	11	12	33	33	0	44	
11	Albion	34	9	11	14	33	50	−17	38	
12	Cerro Largo	34	9	10	15	20	36	−16	37	
13	Plaza Colonia	34	8	11	15	27	35	−8	35	
14	Montevideo City Torque	34	8	9	17	35	48	−13	33	
15	Rentistas (Note: Rentistas were awarded three points and Cerrito were deducted three points due to Cerrito fielding the ineligible player Franco Martínez during the Torneo Apertura match between both teams.)	34	7	3	24	30	58	−28	27	
16	Cerrito	34	3	8	23	15	67	−52	14	

Updated to match(es) played on 9 October 2022. Source: AUF
Rules for classification: 1) Points, 2) Playoff game, in case two teams are tied for first place.
If there are more than two teams tied in points: 2) Goal difference, 3) Goals for, 4) Head-to-head record, 5) Drawing of lots, 6) Playoff game, in case two teams are still tied for first place.
(T) Qualified, but not yet for the particular phase indicated; (X) Assured of Copa Sudamericana, but may still qualify for Copa Libertadores

== 2022 Copa Uruguay ==
=== Round of 32 ===
23 August 2022
20:30 UTC−3

Juventud (Colonia)	1-2	River Plate
J. Torres 58' (yellow card) 24' (red card) 90+5'; Morán (yellow card) 9'; Díaz (yellow card) 42' (red card) 90+3'; L. Pérez (yellow card) 52'; Casaña (red card) 87'; Colo (red card) 90+6'	Report	Chopitea 9'; Clar 63' de los Santos (yellow card) 22'; Vera (yellow card) 41'; Alfonso (red card) 90+3'; F. Correa (red card) 90+5'

Supicci, Colonia del Sacramento
Referee: Pablo Giménez

River Plate advanced to Round of 16

=== Round of 16 ===
28 September 2022
20:30

Defensor Sporting	2-0	River Plate
Ferrari 42'; Duarte 76'; Quintana (yellow card) 29'; Dufour (yellow card) 69'	Report	Vera (yellow card) 19'; Galletto (yellow card) 70'; Vidal (yellow card) 90+1'

Franzini, Montevideo
Referee: Mathías de Armas

Defensor Sporting advanced to Quarterfinals

== 2022 Copa Sudamericana ==
=== First stage ===
9 March 2022
19:15 UTC−3

Liverpool (Uruguay)	0–1	River Plate
Díaz (yellow card) 11' (yellow-red card) 48'; Romero (yellow card) 81'; Rodríguez (yellow card) 85'	Report	Borbas 18' (pen.) (yellow card) 58'; Salaberry (yellow card) 7'; Alfonso (yellow card) 22'; Montiel (yellow card) 76' (yellow-red card) 90+2'; Fonseca (yellow card) 90+2'

Estadio Centenario, Montevideo (Note: Liverpool played their home match at Estadio Centenario, Montevideo instead of their regular stadium Estadio Belvedere, Montevideo, which did not meet CONMEBOL requirements.)
Referee: Yender Herrera (Venezuela)

16 March 2022
19:15 UTC−3

River Plate	2–0	Liverpool
N. Sosa 64', 85' (yellow card) 86'; Castro (yellow card) 34'; Salaberry (yellow card) 50'	Report	P. González (yellow card) 13'; Carneiro (yellow card) 36' (yellow-red card) 87'; Lemos (red card) 90+5'

Estadio Centenario, Montevideo (Note: River Plate played their home match at Estadio Centenario, Montevideo (originally scheduled at Parque Alfredo Víctor Viera, Montevideo) instead of their regular stadium Parque Federico Omar Saroldi, Montevideo, which did not meet CONMEBOL requirements.)
Referee: Nicolás Lamolina (Argentina)

River Plate won 3–0 on aggregate and advanced to the group stage (URU 2).

=== Group stage ===
==== Group B ====
Pos	Team	Pld	W	D	L	GF	GA	GD	Pts	Qualification
1	(Peru) Melgar	6	4	0	2	10	6	+4	12	Round of 16
2	(Argentina) Racing	6	4	0	2	7	5	+2	12	
3	(Brazil) Cuiabá	6	2	0	4	7	10	−3	6	
4	(Uruguay) River Plate	6	2	0	4	5	8	−3	6	

Source: CONMEBOL
7 April 2022
19:15 UTC−3

River Plate	0-1	Racing
Alfonso (yellow card) 24'; Clar (yellow card) 36'; Aja (yellow card) 64'; Ichazo (yellow card) 90+3'; Pereira (yellow card) 90+3'	Report	Miranda 90+1'; Chancalay (yellow card) 29'; Piovi (yellow card) 90+6'

Estadio Centenario, Montevideo
Referee: Guillermo Guerrero (Ecuador)

13 April 2022
17:15 UTC−5

Melgar	2-0	River Plate
Cuesta 3' 78'; Quevedo (yellow card) 90+1'	Report	Galleto (yellow card) 34'; Pereira (yellow card) 45+1'

Estadio Monumental de la UNSA, Arequipa
Referee: Franklin Congo (Ecuador)

27 April 2022
18:15 UTC−4

Cuiabá	1-2	River Plate
Marquinhos 48'; Araújo (yellow card) 41'; Élton (yellow card) 54'	Report	Salaberry 12' (yellow card) 54'; López 45+1'; Montiel (yellow card) 35'; Alfonso (yellow card) 90+5'

Arena Pantanal, Cuiabá
Referee: Cristian Garay (Chile)

3 May 2022
19:15 UTC−3

River Plate	1-2	Melgar
Lavega 90+3'; Clar (yellow card) 24'; Borbas (yellow card) 75'	Report	Cuesta 22'; Archimbaud 90+6' (yellow card) 90+6'; Reyna (yellow card) 38'; Cáceda (red card) 56'

Estadio Centenario, Montevideo
Referee: Carlos Benítez (Paraguay)

18 May 2022
19:15 UTC−3

River Plate	1-2	Cuiabá
Clar 90+6'; Sosa (yellow card) 20'; Nápoli (yellow card) 68'	Report	A. Luis 43' 90'; G. Brandão (yellow card) 15'

Estadio Centenario, Montevideo
Referee: Alex Cajas (Ecuador)

26 May 2022
19:15 UTC−3

Racing	0-1	River Plate
Mura (yellow card) 49'; Alcaraz (yellow card) 75'	Report	Salaberry 66'; Ocampo (yellow card) 90+5'

Estadio Presidente Juan Domingo Perón, Avellaneda
Referee: Cristian Garay (Chile)
