= 2023 Uruguayan Segunda División season =

Segunda División Profesional
- Season: 2023
- Dates: 4 March 2023 – 27 January 2024
- Champions: Miramar Misiones (4th title)
- Promoted: Miramar Misiones; Progreso; Rampla Juniors
- Relegated: Bella Vista; Potencia
- Matches: 230
- Goals: 557 (2.42 per match)
- Biggest home win: Progreso 5–0 Atenas (10 March); Rampla Juniors 5–0 Cerrito (3 December)
- Biggest away win: Cerrito 1–6 Miramar Misiones (4 November)
- Highest scoring: Cerrito 2–6 Uruguay Montevideo (21 October)

The 2023 Uruguayan Segunda División season was the 116th season of the Uruguayan Segunda División, the second division championship of football in Uruguay. The season, named "Señor Fabián O'Neill", started on 4 March 2023 and ended on 27 January 2024. A total of 14 teams competed in the season; the top two teams and the winner of the promotion play-offs were promoted to the Uruguayan Primera División.

Miramar Misiones were the champions, claiming their fourth title in the second tier with a 2–0 victory over Albion on the last round of the regular season on 3 December 2023. Progreso, as league runners-up, were also promoted to Primera División along with Miramar Misiones. The third promoted team was Rampla Juniors, winners of the promotion play-offs.

== Club information ==
Locations of the 2023 season teams outside Montevideo.
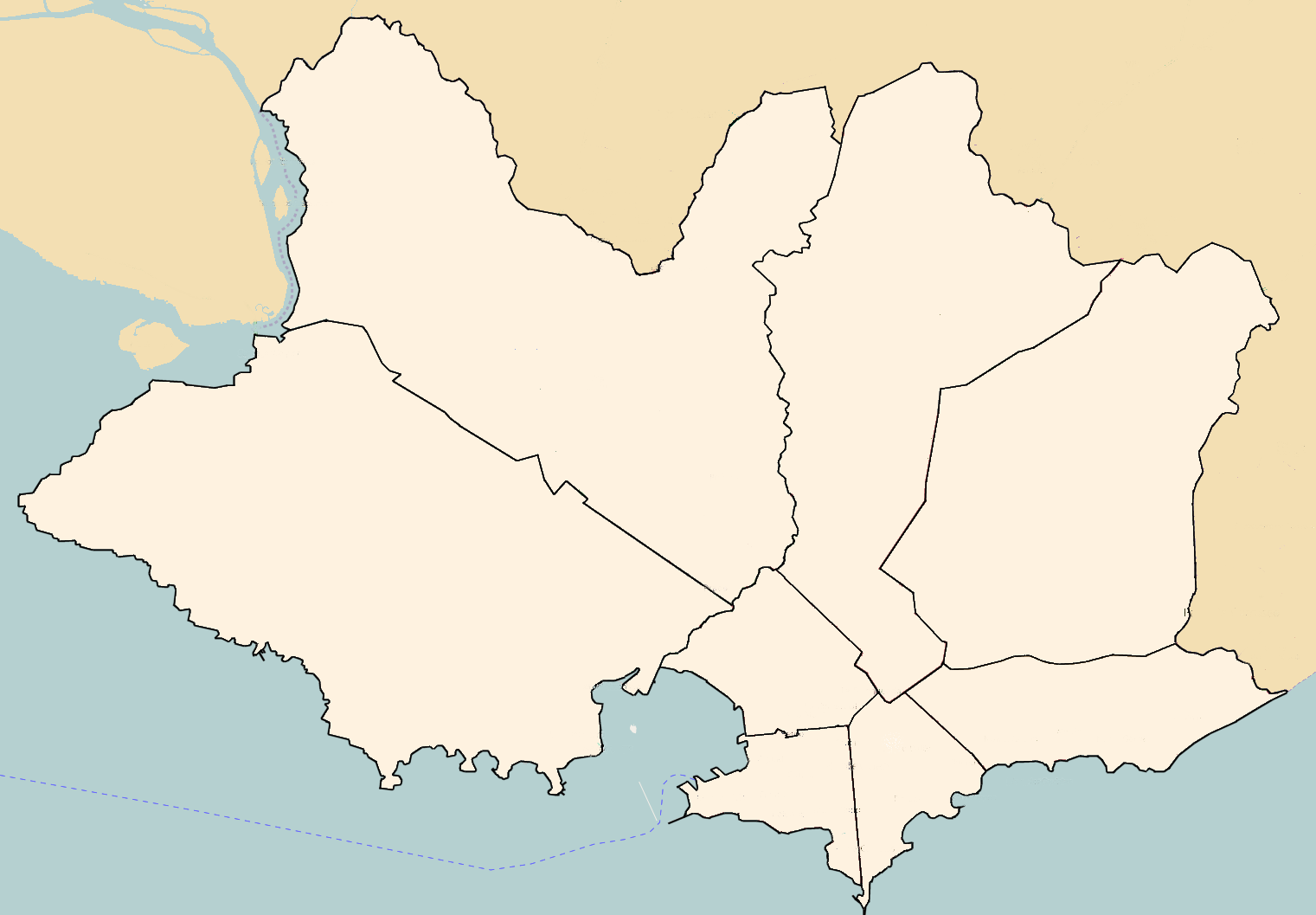
Locations of the 2023 Segunda División teams within Montevideo.

Club	City	Stadium	Capacity
Albion	Montevideo	Parque Falco	2,000
Atenas	San Carlos	Atenas	6,000
Bella Vista	Montevideo	José Nasazzi	10,000
Cerrito	Montevideo	Parque Maracaná	8,000
Juventud	Las Piedras	Parque Artigas	12,000
Miramar Misiones	Montevideo	Parque Luis Méndez Piana	6,500
Oriental	La Paz	Parque Oriental	1,500
Potencia	Montevideo	Parque 13 de Febrero	1,000
Progreso	Montevideo	Parque Abraham Paladino	8,000
Rampla Juniors	Montevideo	Olímpico	9,500
Rentistas	Montevideo	Complejo Rentistas	10,600
Sud América	Montevideo	Parque Carlos Angel Fossa	6,000
Tacuarembó	Tacuarembó	Raúl Goyenola	12,000
Uruguay Montevideo	Montevideo	Parque ANCAP	4,000

== Torneo Competencia ==
The Torneo Competencia, named "César Pintos", was the first stage of the tournament. The 14 participating teams were divided into two groups of seven where they played each one of the teams under a single round-robin format. The winners of each group advanced to the final, with the winner being assured of a berth into the promotion play-offs.

=== Serie A ===
Pos	Team	Pld	W	D	L	GF	GA	GD	Pts	Qualification	PRO	RAM	ORI	ALB	SUD	URU	ATE
1	Progreso	6	4	2	0	11	2	+9	14	Advance to Final	—	—	—	1–0	2–0	—	5–0
2	Rampla Juniors	6	4	1	1	10	6	+4	13		2–2	—	1–0	—	—	3–1	—
3	Oriental	6	3	1	2	8	4	+4	10		0–0	—	—	—	1–0	1–2	—
4	Albion	6	2	1	3	8	12	−4	7		—	2–0	1–5	—	—	—	1–1
5	Sud América	6	2	0	4	7	10	−3	6		—	1–3	—	4–2	—	—	0–2
6	Uruguay Montevideo	6	2	0	4	5	9	−4	6		0–1	—	—	1–2	0–2	—	—
7	Atenas	6	1	1	4	3	9	−6	4		—	0–1	0–1	—	—	0–1	—

Source: Soccerway
Legend: Blue = home team win; Yellow = draw; Red = away team win.
Rules for classification: 1) Points, 2) Goal difference, 3) Goals scored, 4) Head-to-head points, 5) Head-to-head goal difference, 6) Head-to-head goals scored.

=== Serie B ===
Pos	Team	Pld	W	D	L	GF	GA	GD	Pts	Qualification	JUV	MIM	REN	BEL	POT	CER	TAC
1	Juventud	6	4	1	1	9	2	+7	13	Advance to Final	—	0–0	—	—	2–0	3–0	—
2	Miramar Misiones	6	3	3	0	12	8	+4	12		—	—	2–1	—	3–2	—	4–2
3	Rentistas	6	3	2	1	7	3	+4	11		1–0	—	—	2–0	—	0–0	—
4	Bella Vista	6	2	1	3	7	8	−1	7		0–2	1–1	—	—	—	2–0	—
5	Potencia	6	1	2	3	8	12	−4	5		—	—	1–1	2–1	—	—	2–2
6	Cerrito	6	1	2	3	5	10	−5	5		—	2–2	—	—	3–1	—	0–2
7	Tacuarembó	6	1	1	4	8	13	−5	4		1–2	—	0–2	1–3	—	—	—

Source: Soccerway
Legend: Blue = home team win; Yellow = draw; Red = away team win.
Rules for classification: 1) Points, 2) Goal difference, 3) Goals scored, 4) Head-to-head points, 5) Head-to-head goal difference, 6) Head-to-head goals scored.

=== Final ===
29 April 2023
13:00 UTC−3

Juventud	1–5	Progreso
John Kleber 14'	Report	Viera 11'; Mieres 21'; López 43'; Adamo 76'; Moreira 84'

Estadio Parque Alfredo Víctor Viera, Montevideo
Referee: Pablo Giménez

== Regular stage ==
In the regular stage, the 14 teams played each other twice under a double round-robin format for a total of 26 matches. Teams carried over their Torneo Competencia performances to this stage. The top two teams at the end of the regular stage were promoted to the Uruguayan Primera División, while the teams placing from third to sixth place advanced to the promotion play-offs.

=== Standings ===
Pos	Team	Pld	W	D	L	GF	GA	GD	Pts	Promotion or qualification
1	Miramar Misiones (C, P)	32	18	12	2	52	24	+28	66	Promotion to Primera División
2	Progreso (P)	32	19	8	5	60	36	+24	65	Promotion to Primera División
3	Uruguay Montevideo	32	17	5	10	47	33	+14	56	Advance to Promotion play-offs
4	Juventud	32	15	6	11	38	30	+8	51	Advance to Promotion play-offs
5	Rentistas	32	12	11	9	39	27	+12	47	Advance to Promotion play-offs
6	Rampla Juniors (P)	32	12	11	9	41	32	+9	47	Advance to Promotion play-offs
7	Oriental	32	14	5	13	40	39	+1	47	
8	Albion	32	12	5	15	44	41	+3	41	
9	Cerrito	32	11	8	13	38	56	−18	41	
10	Atenas	32	10	10	12	26	32	−6	40	
11	Tacuarembó	32	11	6	15	43	49	−6	39	
12	Bella Vista	32	8	5	19	24	48	−24	29	
13	Sud América	32	6	8	18	26	45	−19	26	
14	Potencia	32	3	12	17	24	50	−26	21	

Source: Soccerway
Rules for classification: 1) Points, 2) Playoff game, in case two teams are tied for first place.
If there are more than two teams tied in points: 2) Goal difference, 3) Goals for, 4) Head-to-head points, 5) Head-to-head goals scored, 6) Playoff game, in case two teams are still tied for first place.
(C) Champions; (P) Promoted

=== Results ===
Home \ Away	ALB	ATE	BEL	CER	JUV	MIM	ORI	POT	PRO	RAM	REN	SUD	TAC	URU
Albion	—	0–1	0–1	1–1	3–2	0–2	2–0	0–0	3–0	2–1	3–2	2–1	1–2	0–1
Atenas	0–0	—	1–0	1–1	1–2	0–0	0–1	3–0	1–1	1–2	0–2	0–0	1–0	0–1
Bella Vista	1–5	1–1	—	3–2	1–2	0–1	0–3	1–1	0–1	1–1	0–1	1–0	1–2	1–1
Cerrito	2–1	0–1	2–1	—	3–0	1–6	2–1	0–0	1–3	1–1	1–0	2–1	2–1	2–6
Juventud	1–0	1–1	3–0	1–0	—	0–1	1–0	2–0	1–1	1–2	2–0	2–0	2–0	0–2
Miramar Misiones	1–0	0–1	4–0	2–2	1–0	—	1–0	3–0	2–2	0–0	0–0	1–1	3–2	1–1
Oriental	1–4	3–1	0–2	2–0	2–1	1–3	—	1–0	0–2	1–1	1–4	3–1	1–1	0–0
Potencia	1–3	1–1	0–1	0–2	2–2	0–1	2–1	—	2–2	1–1	1–3	1–2	1–1	0–1
Progreso	3–2	3–1	2–0	4–2	2–1	1–1	0–2	2–0	—	1–1	3–1	0–3	3–2	1–2
Rampla Juniors	0–2	1–0	2–0	5–0	1–1	0–0	1–3	2–0	0–1	—	1–1	1–1	0–1	4–1
Rentistas	1–0	1–2	0–1	1–1	0–0	2–0	0–1	0–0	3–0	2–0	—	1–1	2–0	3–3
Sud América	2–1	0–1	1–0	1–2	0–1	0–1	1–1	1–1	0–4	0–3	0–0	—	1–2	0–1
Tacuarembó	1–1	1–1	3–0	0–1	1–0	1–3	5–2	1–2	2–4	1–0	1–1	2–0	—	2–0
Uruguay Montevideo	1–0	1–2	1–0	3–0	4–0	1–2	0–1	1–0	1–3	3–0	2–1	1–1	3–0	—

Source: Soccerway
Legend: Blue = home team win; Yellow = draw; Red = away team win.

== Promotion play-offs ==
=== Bracket ===
Semi-finals
Rampla Juniors	0	3	3
Uruguay Montevideo	0	0	0
Rentistas	0	1	1
Juventud	0	2	2

Finals
Rampla Juniors	2	0	2
Juventud	1	0	1

=== Semi-finals ===
==== First leg ====
15 January 2024
17:00 UTC−3

Rampla Juniors	0–0	Uruguay Montevideo
	Report

Estadio Olímpico, Montevideo
Referee: Pablo Giménez

15 January 2024
19:30 UTC−3

Rentistas	0–0	Juventud
	Report

Estadio Complejo Rentistas, Montevideo
Referee: Hernán Heras

==== Second leg ====
19 January 2024
17:30 UTC−3

Uruguay Montevideo	0–3	Rampla Juniors
	Report	Añasco 25'; Barreto 46'; Vargas 73'

Estadio Centenario, Montevideo
Referee: Daniel Rodríguez

Rampla Juniors won 3–0 on aggregate.

19 January 2024
17:30 UTC−3

Juventud	2–1	Rentistas
Melazzi 43'; Pérez 75'	Report	Berríos 45'

Estadio Parque Artigas, Las Piedras
Referee: Jonathan Fuentes

Juventud won 2–1 on aggregate.

=== Finals ===
23 January 2024
17:30 UTC−3

Rampla Juniors	2–1	Juventud
Barreto 9'; Gauthier 90+3' (o.g.)	Report	Mimbacas 30'

Estadio Olímpico, Montevideo
Referee: Santiago Motta

27 January 2024
16:30 UTC−3

Juventud	0–0	Rampla Juniors
	Report

Estadio Parque Artigas, Las Piedras
Referee: Pablo Giménez

Rampla Juniors won 2–1 on aggregate and promoted to the Uruguayan Primera División.

== Relegation ==
Pos	Team	2022 Pts	2023 Pts	Total Pts	Total Pld	Avg	Relegation
1	Miramar Misiones	40	66	106	59	1.797	
2	Uruguay Montevideo	44	56	100	59	1.695	
3	Progreso	31	65	96	59	1.627	
4	Rentistas	—	47	47	32	1.469	
5	Oriental	—	47	47	32	1.469	
6	Rampla Juniors	35	47	82	59	1.39	
7	Juventud	27	51	78	59	1.322	
8	Albion	—	41	41	32	1.281	
9	Cerrito	—	41	41	32	1.281	
10	Atenas	32	40	72	59	1.22	
11	Tacuarembó	—	39	39	32	1.219	
12	Sud América	33	26	59	59	1	
13	Bella Vista (R)	—	29	29	32	0.906	Relegation to Primera División Amateur
14	Potencia (R)	—	21	21	32	0.656	Relegation to Primera División Amateur

== See also ==
- 2023 Uruguayan Primera División season
- 2023 Copa Uruguay
