= Juan Boselli =

Uruguayan footballer (born 1994)

Personal information
- Full name: Juan Martín Boselli Duque
- Date of birth: 28 October 1994 (age 32)
- Place of birth: Montevideo, Uruguay
- Height: 1.76 m (5 ft 9 in)
- Position: Winger

Team information
- Current team: La Luz
- Number: 7

Youth career
- 2010–2015: Fénix

Senior career*
| Years | Team | Apps | (Gls) |
| 2015–2016 | Fénix | 0 | (0) |
| 2015–2016 | → Juventud (loan) | 26 | (4) |
| 2016–2019 | Peñarol | 6 | (0) |
| 2017–2018 | → Montevideo Wanderers (loan) | 9 | (0) |
| 2018–2019 | → Valladolid B (loan) | 3 | (0) |
| 2019 | Albacete | 1 | (0) |
| 2019–2020 | Internacional de Madrid | 8 | (0) |
| 2021 | Fénix | 8 | (0) |
| 2022 | Boston River | 1 | (0) |
| 2023–2024 | La Luz | 44 | (1) |
| 2025– | CA Juventud | 15 | (0) |
- * Club domestic league appearances and goals as of 1 October 2025

Juan Martín Boselli Duque (born 28 October 1994) is an Uruguayan footballer who plays as a right winger for CA Juventud.

== Career ==
Boselli began playing football in the youth system of Centro Atlético Fénix. After graduating, he had a trial with Segunda División B side Cartagena FC, then managed by compatriot Julio César Ribas. He wasn't able to sign for the club after failing to get a work permit, and instead went out on loan to Uruguayan Primera Division side Juventud de Las Piedras. Boselli had his most successful spell of professional football at Juventud, scoring four goals in 26 league matches. The following season he was recruited by Uruguay's top club Peñarol.
