= Tomás Lerman =

Argentine footballer

Personal information
- Full name: Tomás Lerman
- Date of birth: 3 February 1995 (age 31)
- Place of birth: Santa Fe, Argentina
- Height: 1.85 m (6 ft 1 in)
- Position: Midfielder

Team information
- Current team: Colón FC
- Number: 24

Youth career
- Unión Santa Fe

Senior career*
Years	Team	Apps	(Gls)
2015	Unión Santa Fe	0	(0)
2016	Libertad Sunchales	–	(–)
2016–2019	Boston River	0	(0)
2018	→ Central Español (loan)	11	(3)
2019	→ Rentistas (loan)	11	(1)
2020	Rampla Juniors	13	(0)
2021	Desamparados	15	(0)
2022	Villa Española	24	(1)
2023	Santa Lucía	15	(1)
2023	Potencia	12	(2)
2024	Santiago Morning	12	(0)
2025	Tacuarembó	18	(1)
2026–	Colón FC	1	(0)
- * Club domestic league appearances and goals as of 11 May 2024

Tomás Lerman (born 3 February 1995) is an Argentine footballer who plays as a midfielder for Uruguayan club Colón FC.

== Club career ==
Born in Santa Fe, Argentina, Lerman is a product of Unión de Santa Fe and made appearances for the reserve team. In 2016, he moved to Libertad de Sunchales in the Liga Rafaelina.

In the second half of 2016, he moved to Uruguay and signed with Boston River, being loaned out to Central Español and Rentistas in 2018 and 2019, respectively. In 2020, he switched to Rampla Juniors.

Back to Argentina in 2021, Lerman joined Sportivo Desamparados in the Torneo Federal A. The next year, he returned to Uruguay to play for Villa Española, becoming the team captain.

In 2023, he moved to Guatemala and joined Santa Lucía in the top division. In the second half of the same year, he returned to Uruguay again and played for IA Potencia.

In 2024, he moved to Chile and signed with Santiago Morning.
