= 2006 Torneo di Viareggio =

2006 Torneo Mondiale di Calcio Coppa Carnevale
58° Torneo di Viareggio

Tournament details
- Host country: Italy
- City: Viareggio
- Dates: February 13, 2006 - February 27, 2006
- Teams: 48

Final positions
- Champions: (Uruguay) Juventud
- Runners-up: (Italy) Juventus
- Third place: (Italy) Roma
- Fourth place: (Italy) Siena

Tournament statistics
- Matches played: 88
- Goals scored: 227 (2.58 per match)
- Best player(s): (Italy) André Cuneaz

The 2006 winners of the Torneo di Viareggio (in English, the Viareggio Tournament, officially the Viareggio Cup World Football Tournament Coppa Carnevale), the annual youth football tournament held in Viareggio, Tuscany, are listed below.

== Format ==
The 48 teams are seeded in 12 pools, split up into 6-pool groups. Each team from a pool meets the others in a single tie. The winning club from each pool and two best runners-up from both group A and group B progress to the final knockout stage. All matches in the final rounds are single tie. The Round of 16 envisions penalties and no extra time, while the rest of the final round matches include 30 minutes extra time with Silver goal rule and penalties to be played if the draw between teams still holds. Semifinal losing teams play 3rd-place final with penalties after regular time. The winning sides play the final with extra time, no Silver goal rule and repeat the match if the draw holds.

== Participating teams ==
Italian teams

- (Italy) Arezzo
- (Italy) Ascoli
- (Italy) Atalanta
- (Italy) Avellino
- (Italy) Benevento
- (Italy) Cisco Roma
- (Italy) Empoli
- (Italy) Fiorentina
- (Italy) Genoa
- (Italy) Inter Milan
- (Italy) Juventus
- (Italy) Lazio
- (Italy) Livorno
- (Italy) Lucchese
- (Italy) Messina
- (Italy) Milan
- (Italy) Modena
- (Italy) Palermo
- (Italy) Parma
- (Italy) Pistoiese
- (Italy) Serie D Representatives
- (Italy) Roma
- (Italy) Siena
- (Italy) Ternana
- (Italy) Torino
- (Italy) Treviso
- (Italy) Triestina
- (Italy) Udinese

European teams

- (Belgium) Anderlecht
- (North Macedonia) Belasica
- (Denmark) Brondby
- (Switzerland) Grasshoppers
- (Bulgaria) Naftex
- San Marino
- (England) Newcastle
- (Serbia and Montenegro) Partizan
- (Serbia and Montenegro) Red Star Belgrade

Asian teams

- (Uzbekistan) Paxtakor

African Team

- (Zambia) Chambishi

American teams

- (Paraguay) Cerro Porteño
- (Uruguay) Danubio
- (United States) Inter Soccer Boston
- (United States) New York Stars
- (Uruguay) Juventud
- (Mexico) Necaxa
- (Mexico) Pumas
- (Mexico) Santos Laguna

Oceanian teams

- (Australia) APIA Tigers

== Group stage ==
=== Group 1 ===
Team	Pts	Pld	V	D	L	GF	GA	GD
(Italy) Juventus	7	3	2	1	0	8	4	+4
(Serbia and Montenegro) Red Star Belgrade	7	3	2	1	0	3	1	+2
(Belgium) Anderlecht	3	3	1	0	2	6	5	+1
(Italy) Lazio	0	3	0	0	3	2	9	-7

=== Group 2 ===
Team	Pts	Pld	V	D	L	GF	GA	GD
(Italy) Atalanta	7	3	2	1	0	5	0	+5
(Italy) Ascoli	6	3	2	0	1	3	2	+1
(Paraguay) Cerro Porteño	4	3	1	1	1	7	2	+5
(Zambia) Chambishi	0	3	0	0	3	0	11	-11

=== Group 3 ===
Team	Pts	Pld	V	D	L	GF	GA	GD
(Italy) Fiorentina	7	3	2	1	0	7	3	+4
(Serbia and Montenegro) Partizan	6	3	2	0	1	6	6	0
(Denmark) Brondby	2	3	0	2	1	1	2	-1
(Italy) Arezzo	1	3	0	1	2	2	5	-3

=== Group 4 ===
Team	Pts	Pld	V	D	L	GF	GA	GD
(Italy) Treviso	9	3	3	0	0	8	2	+6
(North Macedonia) Belasica	6	3	2	0	1	4	4	0
(Italy) Genoa	3	3	1	0	2	1	3	-2
(Mexico) Santos Laguna	0	3	0	0	3	1	5	-4

=== Group 5 ===
Team	Pts	Pld	V	D	L	GF	GA	GD
(Uruguay) Juventud	9	3	3	0	0	4	1	+3
(Italy) Inter Milan	6	3	2	0	1	5	1	+4
(Italy) Ternana	3	3	1	0	2	3	3	0
(Italy) Cisco Roma	0	3	0	0	3	2	9	-7

=== Group 6 ===
Team	Pts	Pld	V	D	L	GF	GA	GD
(Uzbekistan) Paxtakor	9	3	3	0	0	3	0	+3
(Italy) Livorno	4	3	1	1	1	4	4	0
(Bulgaria) Naftex	2	3	0	2	1	3	4	-1
(Italy) Modena	1	3	0	1	2	2	4	-2

=== Group 7 ===
Team	Pts	Pld	V	D	L	GF	GA	GD
(Italy) Milan	9	3	3	0	0	11	1	+10
(Italy) Parma	6	3	2	0	1	5	3	+2
(Australia) APIA Tigers	3	3	1	0	2	1	7	-6
San Marino	0	3	0	0	3	0	6	-6

=== Group 8 ===
Team	Pts	Pld	V	D	L	GF	GA	GD
(Italy) Torino	7	3	2	1	0	4	1	+3
(Uruguay) Danubio	7	3	2	1	0	4	2	+2
(Italy) Messina	1	3	0	1	2	3	5	-2
(Italy) Pistoiese	1	3	0	1	2	4	7	-3

=== Group 9 ===
Team	Pts	Pld	V	D	L	GF	GA	GD
(Italy) Empoli	7	3	2	1	0	22	4	+18
(England) Newcastle	7	3	2	1	0	6	3	+3
(Italy) Avellino	1	3	0	1	2	1	5	-4
(United States) Inter Soccer Boston	1	3	0	1	2	0	17	-17

=== Group 10 ===
Team	Pts	Pld	V	D	L	GF	GA	GD
(Italy) Roma	7	3	2	1	0	8	2	+6
(Italy) Palermo	7	3	2	1	0	7	4	+3
(United States) New York Stars	3	3	1	0	2	4	8	-4
(Italy) Benevento	0	3	0	0	3	3	8	-5

=== Group 11 ===
Team	Pts	Pld	V	D	L	GF	GA	GD
(Italy) Siena	7	3	2	1	0	4	2	+2
(Italy) Udinese	6	3	2	0	1	6	4	+2
(Mexico) Necaxa	2	3	0	2	1	3	4	-1
(Italy) Lucchese	1	3	0	1	2	2	5	-3

=== Group 12 ===
Team	Pts	Pld	V	D	L	GF	GA	GD
(Italy) Triestina	7	3	2	1	0	3	0	+3
(Italy) Serie D Representatives	6	3	2	0	1	3	3	0
(Mexico) Pumas	2	3	0	2	1	0	1	-1
(Switzerland) Grasshoppers	1	3	0	1	2	1	3	-2

== Knockout stage ==
Round of 16
22 February
(Italy) Roma	2
(Italy) Fiorentina	0
22 February
(Italy) Torino	2
(Italy) Inter Milan	1
22 February
(Italy) Empoli	0
(Italy) Juventus	2
22 February
(Italy) Milan	0
(Serbia and Montenegro) Red Star Belgrade	1
22 February
(Italy) Treviso	2
(England) Newcastle	0
22 February
(Uruguay) Juventud (pen)	0 (2)
(Italy) Triestina	0 (3)
22 February
(Uzbekistan) Paxtakor	0
(Italy) Siena	1
22 February
(Italy) Atalanta	0
(Italy) Palermo	1

Quarter-finals
23 February
(Italy) Roma	3
(Italy) Torino	1
23 February
(Italy) Juventus	1
(Serbia and Montenegro) Red Star Belgrade	0
23 February
(Italy) Treviso	0
(Uruguay) Juventud	2
23 February
(Italy) Siena	2
(Italy) Palermo	1

Semi-finals
25 February
(Italy) Roma	0
(Italy) Juventus	4
25 February
(Uruguay) Juventud	3
(Italy) Siena	0

Final
27 February
(Italy) Juventus	0
(Uruguay) Juventud	1
Third place
27 February
(Italy) Roma (pen)	1 (6)
(Italy) Siena	1 (5)

=== Final ===
27 February 2006
15:00 (CET)

Juventus (Italy)	0–3	(Uruguay) Juventud
	[ Report]	Ribas 72'

Stadio dei Pini "Torquato Bresciani"

== Champions ==
Torneo di Viareggio 2006 Champions

Juventud de Las Piedras
1st time
