= Fernando Mimbacas =

Uruguayan footballer (born 2002)

Personal information
- Full name: Fernando Mimbacas Imaz
- Date of birth: 26 March 2002 (age 24)
- Place of birth: Montevideo, Uruguay
- Height: 1.95 m (6 ft 5 in)
- Position: Forward

Team information
- Current team: Juventud

Youth career
- Montevideo Wanderers
- 2017–2020: Progreso
- 2021–2022: Rampla Juniors

Senior career*
| Years | Team | Apps | (Gls) |
| 2022–2023 | Potencia | 29 | (4) |
| 2023–2024 | Juventud | 38 | (16) |
| 2025–2026 | Burgos | 4 | (0) |
| 2025 | → Deportivo Cali (loan) | 13 | (2) |
| 2026– | Juventud | 0 | (0) |
- * Club domestic league appearances and goals as of 12 December 2025

Fernando Mimbacas Imaz (born 26 March 2002) is a Uruguayan professional footballer who plays as a forward for Juventud de Las Piedras.

== Career ==
Born in Montevideo, Mimbacas played for Montevideo Wanderers, Progreso and Rampla Juniors as a youth. On 19 May 2022, after finishing his formation, he signed for Segunda División Amateur side Potencia.

Mimbacas scored four goals for Potencia during the remainder of the 2022 season, as Potencia achieved a first-ever promotion to the Segunda División.

In August 2023, Mimbacas moved to fellow second division side Juventud de Las Piedras. He scored 15 goals for the club during the 2024 campaign, as they achieved promotion to the Primera División, but missed the play-off finals due to an ankle injury.

On 6 January 2025, Mimbacas moved abroad and joined Spanish Segunda División side Burgos CF on a three-and-a-half-year contract. On 26 July, after being rarely used, he moved to Deportivo Cali in the Colombian Categoría Primera A, on loan for one year.

On 1 February 2026, Mimbacas returned to Juventud on a permanent deal, with Burgos retaining 50% over a future sale.
