= Ihojan Pérez =

Uruguayan footballer (born 2006)

Personal information
- Full name: Ihojan Fabián Pérez Cuadro
- Date of birth: 17 February 2006 (age 20)
- Place of birth: Montevideo, Uruguay
- Height: 1.86 m (6 ft 1 in)
- Position: Midfielder

Team information
- Current team: River Plate Montevideo
- Number: 33

Youth career
- River Plate Montevideo

Senior career*
Years	Team	Apps	(Gls)
2023–	River Plate Montevideo	9	(0)
- * Club domestic league appearances and goals as of 05:00, 11 October 2023 (UTC)

Ihojan Fabián Pérez Cuadro (born 17 February 2006) is a Uruguayan footballer who plays as a midfielder for Uruguayan Primera División club River Plate Montevideo.

== Club career ==
Having progressed through the academy of River Plate Montevideo, he made his debut for the club on 4 February 2023 in a 2–1 loss to Cerro Largo, coming on as a second-half substitute for Ramiro Cristóbal. On 11 October 2023, he was named by English newspaper The Guardian as one of the best players born in 2006 worldwide.

== Career statistics ==
=== Club ===
As of 11 October 2023.

Appearances and goals by club, season and competition
Club	Season	League			Cup		Continental		Other		Total	
Club	Season	Division	Apps	Goals	Apps	Goals	Apps	Goals	Apps	Goals	Apps	Goals
River Plate Montevideo	2023	Uruguayan Primera División	9	0	1 (Note: Appearances in the Copa Uruguay)	0	0	0	0	0	10	0
Career total			9	0	1	0	0	0	0	0	10	0
