= Maxi Pereira =

Uruguayan footballer (born 1984)

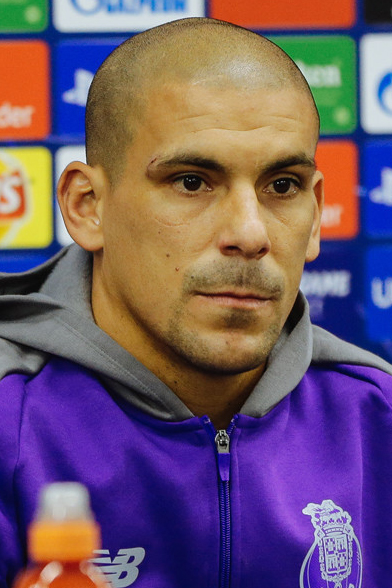
- Pereira with Porto in 2018

Personal information
- Full name: Victorio Maximiliano Pereira Páez
- Date of birth: 8 June 1984 (age 42)
- Place of birth: Montevideo, Uruguay
- Height: 1.73 m (5 ft 8 in)
- Position: Right-back

Youth career
- Bella Vista
- 2002: Defensor

Senior career*
Years	Team	Apps	(Gls)
2002–2007	Defensor	125	(25)
2007–2015	Benfica	212	(13)
2015–2019	Porto	89	(3)
2021	Peñarol	20	(1)
2022–2023	River Plate (UY)	46	(1)
Total		492	(43)

International career
2005–2018	Uruguay	125	(3)
Medal record
Representing Uruguay
Copa América
Winner	Argentina 2011
- * Club domestic league appearances and goals

Victorio Maximiliano "Maxi" Pereira Páez (Spanish pronunciation: [ˈmaksi peˈrejra]; born 8 June 1984) is a Uruguayan former professional footballer who played as a right-back.

He played with Defensor in Uruguay, joining Benfica in 2007 and going on to remain with the club for eight seasons, appearing in 333 official matches and winning 11 major titles. In 2015, he signed with Porto also in Portugal.

A Uruguay international on 125 occasions, Pereira represented the nation in three World Cups and four Copa América, winning the 2011 edition of the latter tournament.

== Club career ==
=== Defensor ===
Born in Montevideo, Pereira was known by the nickname "Mono" (Monkey) in his homeland. He began playing football as a forward at C.A. Bella Vista before moving to Defensor Sporting where he re-adapted as a midfielder; he dealt in his early years with homesickness and the death of his father.

Pereira made his professional debut as an 18-year-old, early in the 2002–03 season. He took no time to adjust to the first team, being a crucial part alongside Álvaro González and scoring a career-best 12 goals in the Primera División of 2005–06. After the 2006–07 campaign, Defensor lost both gems as González was transferred to Boca Juniors and Pereira went to S.L. Benfica, accompanied by countryman Cristian Rodríguez; the Primeira Liga club signed the player for €3 million and 70% of his rights.

=== Benfica ===
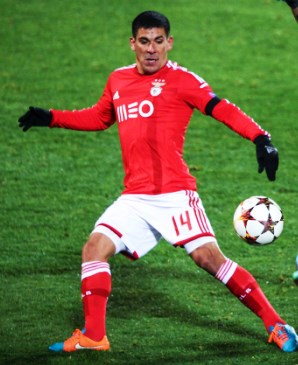
Pereira playing for Benfica in 2014

In his first year in Portugal, Pereira was initially played as a right midfielder, failing to adjust to that position. He did score in two consecutive home games in November 2007, in a 6–1 league thrashing of Boavista F.C. and in the group stage of the UEFA Champions League 1–1 draw against AC Milan, with his left foot from outside the box.

Pereira switched to right-back the following campaign after Nélson Marcos moved to Real Betis, and became ever-present. In 2009–10, as Benfica won the league after five years – adding the Taça da Liga – he appeared in 37 competitive matches, scoring four goals in 2,932 minutes of action.

On 17 December 2011, Pereira renewed his contract until 2015 and the club paid €2.7 million for the remaining 30% of his rights, still in possession of Defensor. He netted two goals in the 2011–12 Champions League, both coming against FC Zenit Saint Petersburg in the round-of-16 (3–2 away loss, 2–0 home win, both through tap-ins) as his team eventually reached the quarter-finals of the competition, where he was sent off in the first half of the second leg against Chelsea after two bookable offences (1–1 away draw, 2–1 aggregate defeat).

Pereira reached the 300-game milestone at Benfica on 2 October 2014, in a Champions League match against Bayer 04 Leverkusen, becoming the second foreigner behind Luisão to achieve this feat. On 2 May of the following year, he scored twice in a 5–0 rout at Gil Vicente FC, contributing a further three goals as the team renewed their domestic supremacy.

=== Porto ===
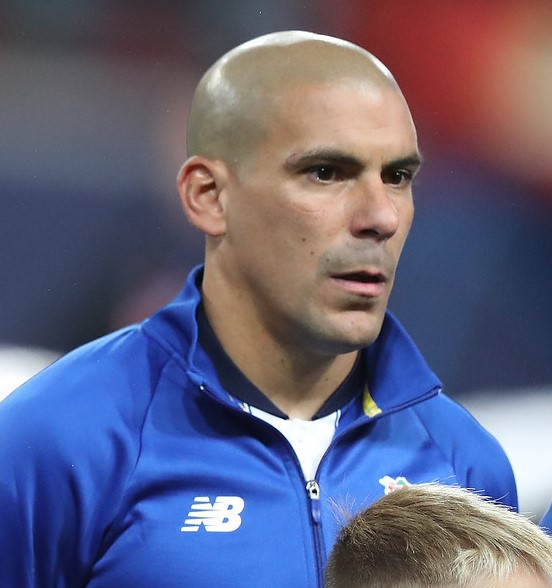
Pereira with Porto in October 2018

On 30 June 2015, Pereira left Benfica following the expiration of his contract. Fifteen days later, he joined rivals FC Porto as a replacement for Real Madrid-bound Danilo. His competitive debut occurred on 15 August, in a 3–0 home victory over Vitória S.C. where he provided two assists for teammates Vincent Aboubakar and Silvestre Varela. The following 6 March he scored his first goal for the team, a late equaliser in a 1–3 loss at S.C. Braga.

On 22 May 2016, in the final of the Taça de Portugal, also against Braga, Pereira's attempt in the penalty shootout was saved by José Marafona, in an eventual 2–4 defeat (2–2 after 120 minutes). The following 14 March, in the away leg of the last 16 of the Champions League against Juventus FC, he received a straight red card for handling Gonzalo Higuaín's goal-bound shot, conceding a penalty from which Paulo Dybala scored the only goal to eliminate the Portuguese 3–0 on aggregate.

After playing a part in winning the national championship in the 2017–18 season, Pereira was awarded a new deal of undisclosed length. On 4 August 2018, he scored in the 3–1 win over C.D. Aves in the Supertaça Cândido de Oliveira, and was voted player of the match.

Pereira's contract expired in June 2019. In November 2020, it was reported that he was training with Porto's farm team Padroense F.C. and had not announced his retirement. In the same month, he sued his former club for an alleged debt of €1.24 million to him.

=== Return to Uruguay ===
On 1 February 2021, Pereira returned to his homeland's league for the first time in 14 years, signing for Peñarol on a contract until July, with an option for the remainder of the year. He made his debut on 6 March as a last-minute substitute for Juan Acosta in a 2–0 home win over Club Atlético River Plate. He scored the only goal in the third minute of a victory at C.A. Rentistas on 9 October, as his team went on to win the title.

Pereira signed for River Plate on 23 January 2022. Having played 42 games, the 38-year-old renewed his contract a year later, and retired on 18 May.

== International career ==
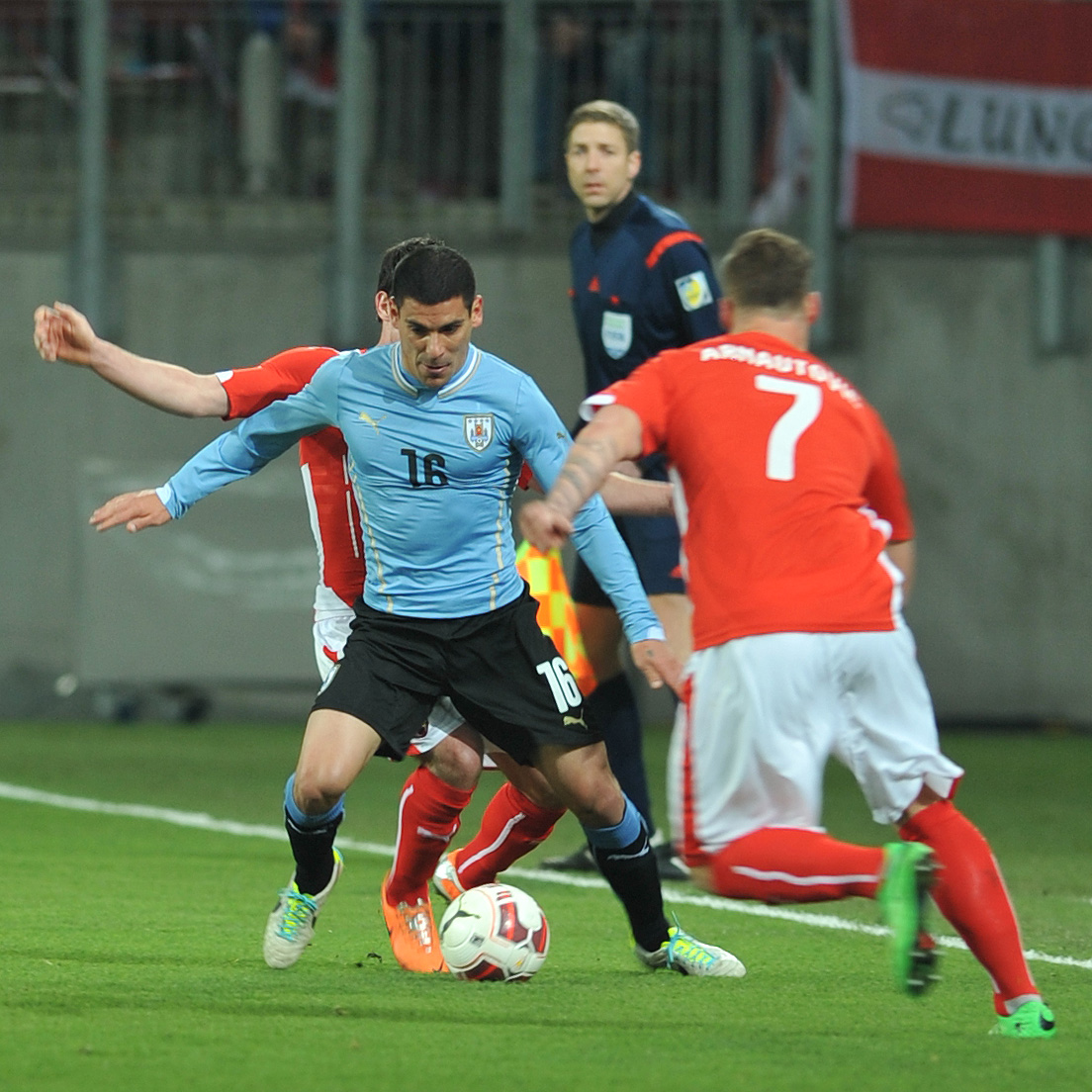
Pereira in action in a friendly against Austria in March 2014

A Uruguayan international since making his debut on 26 October 2005 in a friendly loss, away against Mexico, Pereira quickly became a regular for his country, and represented it at the 2007 Copa América. He was selected for the squad at the 2010 FIFA World Cup in South Africa, playing all the games and minutes for the eventual semi-finalists. In the quarter-finals against Ghana, he missed his penalty shootout attempt but the side eventually advanced to the next stage, where he scored his first goal as an international in a 3–2 loss to the Netherlands, finding the net in the 91st minute.

Pereira was again an undisputed starter for Uruguay in the 2011 Copa América held in Argentina, with the national team winning their 15th continental tournament. He played 14 times in qualification for the 2014 World Cup, scoring once in a 4–2 victory over Peru on 10 June 2012 and opening the scoring as his team won 5–0 away to Jordan in a play-off to qualify for the tournament, on 13 November of the following year.

Pereira was the first player sent off in the finals in Brazil, receiving his marching orders in injury time of the opening 3–1 defeat to Costa Rica in Fortaleza after kicking Joel Campbell. He played a further two matches in the tournament, which ended for the Charrúas at the last-16 stage.

On 28 March 2015, Pereira earned his 100th cap in a 1–0 friendly defeat of Morocco in Agadir, becoming only the second Uruguayan after Diego Forlán to reach the milestone. He played every minute of the campaign at that year's Copa América, captaining the team in their final group fixture against Paraguay in place of the suspended Diego Godín.

On 9 June 2016, Pereira surpassed Forlán as Uruguay's most capped player by earning his 113th in the team's final group game at the Copa América Centenario in the United States; the 1–0 loss to Venezuela eliminated the nation. The 34-year-old was also selected for the 2018 World Cup, but did not leave the bench. He retired in November of that year with 125 caps to his name.

== Career statistics ==
=== Club ===
Team	Season	League			National cup (Note: Appearances in Taça de Portugal)		League cup (Note: Appearances in Taça da Liga)		Continental		Other		Total	
Team	Season	Division	Apps	Goals	Apps	Goals	Apps	Goals	Apps	Goals	Apps	Goals	Apps	Goals
Defensor	2002	Primera División	5	0	—		—		—		—		5	0
Defensor	2003	Primera División	19	3	—		—		—		—		19	3
Defensor	2004	Primera División	14	1	—		—		—		—		14	1
Defensor	2005	Primera División	34	6	—		—		—		—		34	6
Defensor	2005–06	Primera División	29	12	—		—		—		—		29	12
Defensor	2006–07	Primera División	23	3	—		—		9	1	—		32	4
Defensor	2007–08	Primera División	1	0	—		—		2	0	—		3	0
Defensor	Total		125	25	—		—		11	1	—		136	26
Benfica	2007–08	Primeira Liga	23	2	4	0	1	0	8 (Note: Six appearances and one goal in Champions League, two appearances in Europa League)	1	—		36	3
Benfica	2008–09	Primeira Liga	28	1	2	1	5	0	6 (Note: Appearances in Europa League)	0	—		41	2
Benfica	2009–10	Primeira Liga	25	2	0	0	4	0	8	2	—		37	4
Benfica	2010–11	Primeira Liga	26	0	5	0	4	0	14 (Note: Six appearances in Champions League, eight appearances and one goal in Europa League)	1	0	0	49	1
Benfica	2011–12	Primeira Liga	25	0	1	0	4	1	13 (Note: Appearances in Champions League)	2	—		43	3
Benfica	2012–13	Primeira Liga	28	3	4	0	1	0	9 (Note: Five appearances in Champions League and four appearances in Europa League)	0	—		42	3
Benfica	2013–14	Primeira Liga	25	0	5	0	2	0	11 (Note: Four appearances in Champions League and seven appearances in Europa League)	0	—		43	0
Benfica	2014–15	Primeira Liga	32	5	1	0	3	0	5	0	1 (Note: Appearance in Supertaça Cândido de Oliveira)	0	42	5
Benfica	Total		212	13	22	1	24	1	74	6	1	0	333	21
Porto	2015–16	Primeira Liga	32	1	3	0	0	0	7 (Note: Six appearances in Champions League and one appearance in Europa League)	0	—		42	1
Porto	2016–17	Primeira Liga	24	2	2	0	2	0	7	0	—		35	2
Porto	2017–18	Primeira Liga	15	0	3	0	2	0	3	1	—		23	1
Porto	2018–19	Primeira Liga	18	0	2	0	1	0	8	0	1	1	30	1
Porto	Total		89	3	10	0	5	0	25	1	1	1	130	5
Peñarol	2020	Primera División	3	0	—		—		—		—		3	0
Peñarol	2021	Primera División	17	1	—		—		5 (Note: Appearance(s) in Copa Sudamericana)	0	—		22	1
Peñarol	Total		20	1	—		—		5	0	—		25	1
River Plate	2022	Primera División	34	0	—		—		8	0	—		42	0
River Plate	2023	Primera División	12	1	—		—		1	0	—		13	1
River Plate	Total		46	1	—		—		9	0	—		55	1
Career total			492	43	32	1	29	1	124	8	2	1	679	54

=== International ===
National team	Year	Apps	Goals
Uruguay	2005	1	0
Uruguay	2006	7	0
Uruguay	2007	10	0
Uruguay	2008	10	0
Uruguay	2009	7	0
Uruguay	2010	13	1
Uruguay	2011	15	0
Uruguay	2012	9	1
Uruguay	2013	15	1
Uruguay	2014	12	0
Uruguay	2015	10	0
Uruguay	2016	7	0
Uruguay	2017	8	0
Uruguay	2018	1	0
Total		125	3

=== International goals ===
Scores and results list Uruguay's goal tally first, score column indicates score after each Pereira goal.

#	Date	Venue	Opponent	Score	Final	Competition
1.	6 July 2010	Cape Town Stadium, Cape Town, South Africa	Netherlands	2–3	2–3	2010 FIFA World Cup
2.	10 June 2012	Estadio Centenario, Montevideo, Uruguay	Peru	2–0	4–2	2014 World Cup qualification
3.	13 November 2013	Amman International Stadium, Amman, Jordan	Jordan	1–0	5–0	2014 World Cup qualification

== Honours ==
Benfica

- Primeira Liga: 2009–10, 2013–14, 2014–15
- Taça de Portugal: 2013–14
- Taça da Liga: 2008–09, 2009–10, 2010–11, 2011–12, 2013–14, 2014–15
- Supertaça Cândido de Oliveira: 2014
- UEFA Europa League runner-up: 2012–13, 2013–14

Porto

- Primeira Liga: 2017–18
- Supertaça Cândido de Oliveira: 2018
- Taça de Portugal runner-up: 2015–16, 2018–19

Peñarol

- Uruguayan Primera División: 2021

Uruguay

- Copa América: 2011

Individual

- Cosme Damião Awards – Footballer of the Year: 2012

== See also ==
- List of footballers with 100 or more caps
