= Sebastián Ribas =

Uruguayan footballer (born 1988)

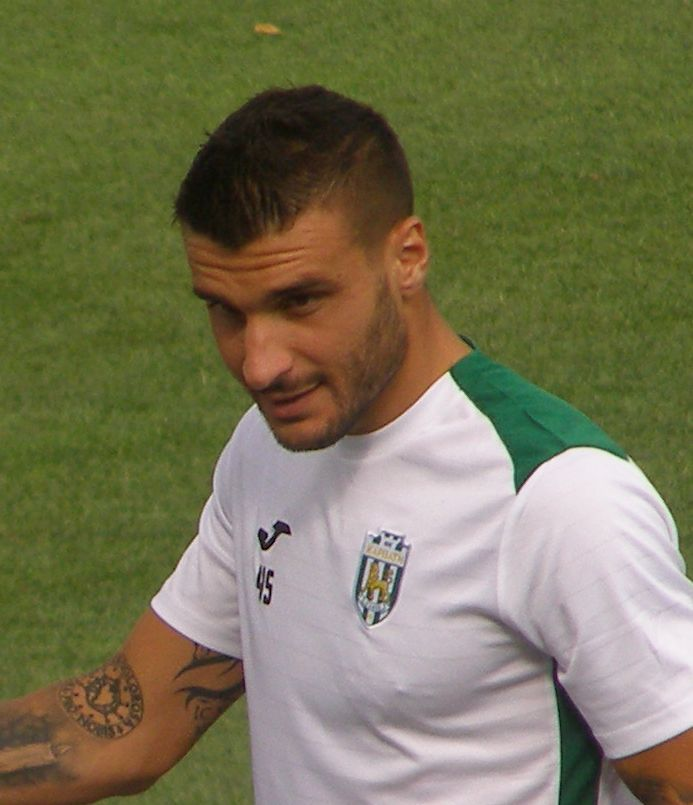
- Ribas with Karpaty Lviv in 2017

Personal information
- Full name: Sebastián César Helios Ribas Barbato
- Date of birth: 11 March 1988 (age 38)
- Place of birth: Montevideo, Uruguay
- Height: 1.89 m (6 ft 2 1/2 in)
- Position: Forward

Youth career
- 1996–2004: Bella Vista
- 2004–2005: Venezia

Senior career*
Years	Team	Apps	(Gls)
2005–2006	Juventud	17	(6)
2006–2008	Internazionale	0	(0)
2007	→ Spezia (loan)	4	(0)
2008–2011	Dijon	106	(48)
2011–2012	Genoa	0	(0)
2012	→ Sporting CP (loan)	5	(0)
2012–2013	→ Monaco B (loan)	5	(0)
2013	→ Barcelona SC (loan)	5	(0)
2014	→ Strasbourg (loan)	13	(4)
2014–2015	→ Cartagena (loan)	24	(6)
2015	Fénix	5	(0)
2016	River Plate Montevideo	10	(1)
2016–2017	Venados	22	(9)
2017–2018	Karpaty Lviv	4	(1)
2017–2018	→ Patronato (loan)	25	(13)
2018–2022	Lanús	19	(5)
2019–2020	→ Rosario Central (loan)	20	(3)
2020–2021	→ Central Córdoba SdE (loan)	26	(5)
2022	Central Córdoba SdE	11	(0)
2022–2023	Montevideo City Torque	31	(6)
2024	Albion	25	(4)
2025	Fénix	7	(0)
2026	Rangers	5	(1)
- * Club domestic league appearances and goals as of 12 May 2026

Sebastián César Helios Ribas Barbato (born 11 March 1988) is an Uruguayan footballer who plays as a forward.

== Career ==
=== Early career ===
Born in Montevideo, Ribas began made his debuts as a senior with Juventud de Las Piedras, appearing in 17 matches and scoring six goals during his first season.

=== Internazionale ===
Ribas signed with Inter Milan for an undisclosed fee in the 2006 summer. He made his first appearance for the club in the quarter final of Coppa Italia in the second leg in a 2–0 win over Empoli on 17 January 2007.

Ribas scored his first domestic goal for Inter Milan against Atalanta in the Coppa Italia. With his first team opportunities limited, he joined Spezia, also appearing rarely.

=== Dijon ===
Ribas signed Dijon FCO in the summer of 2008 on a three-year contract. In the opening game of the season, Ribas made his debut in a 3–1 loss against Lens. However, in his debut, he received a red card after picking up yellow twice. Few weeks after making his debut on 22 August 2008, Ribas scored a winning goal in a 2–1 win over Tours and on 10 April 2009, he scored his first brace of his career in a 2–1 win over Brest. In his first season, Ribas made 39 appearances and scored nine. At Dijon, Ribas would become an influential player in the club.

The following season, Ribas improved the club when he began a scoring form, resulting scoring sixteen and was the third top-scorer, just behind Anthony Modeste and Olivier Giroud. During the season, Ribas scored his first hat-trick of his Dijon career in a 5–4 goal thriller win over Châteauroux on 30 October 2009, including a winning goal when he scored from a penalty and set up a goal for Christophe Mandanne.

At the end of the year, Ribas was chosen the best player from Ligue 2 in 2010, scoring 25 goals in that year. After scoring a hat-trick in a 3–2 win over Le Mans on 5 March 2011, he put his tally to 15 goals in 26 matches in the current season of Ligue 2, being the current leader of goalscorers and at the end of the season, Ribas scored 23 goals, making him the league's top scorer and the club was promoted to the Ligue 1. Earlier in the season, Ribas scored his first hat-trick of the season in a 5–1 win over Evian on 17 September 2011. At the end of the season, the club announced it negotiations to keep Ribas at the club for another three years and even with his wages increased. However, Ribas rejected a new contract at Dijon. Manager Patrice Carteron was disappointed with Ribas contract been rejected and said in his statement:"But we can not align it could affect elsewhere. Sebastian goes, but death in the soul. And we, too, are necessarily very sad,"

=== Genoa ===
Ribas joined Serie A side Genoa on 6 July 2011. However, his time at Genoa was forgettable over his lack of playing time and barely being used on the bench (although he was in the bench twice earlier in the season). Ribas had also struggled to settle in Italy, though, and has already found himself out of favour and was linked back to Dijon, which was denied by Carteron.

==== Loan spells ====
On 4 January 2012 Ribas joined Sporting CP in a one and a half year loan deal. On 15 January 2012, he made his debut in a 2–1 loss against Braga. Shortly after joining Sporting Lisbon, he would receive playing time in the starting eleven. However under new manager Ricardo Sá Pinto, he would soon fell out of favor with Pinto and was replaced by youngster Diego Rubio. At the end of the season, Ribas loan spell at Lisbon ended.

Ribas transferred to Ligue 2 side AS Monaco on 16 July 2012 in a loan deal, having left France two years earlier. Earlier of the season, Ribas had yet to play his first match. This led Manager Claudio Ranieri says on Ribas stating he "still needs at least one month to be competitive" However, Ribas made no appearances, due to an ongoing injury and returned to Genoa.

On 21 July 2013, he was loaned to Barcelona Sporting Club of Guayaquil. Ribas returns to South America to play for one year with an option for the club to purchase him from Genoa. He returned in January 2014 to Genoa C.F.C., which loaned him on 31 January 2014 for the remainder season to Championnat National club RC Strasbourg.

=== Venados ===
On 3 July 2016, Ribas joined Mexican club Venados.

=== Rangers de Talca ===
In December 2025, Ribas moved to Chile and joined Rangers de Talca in the Liga de Ascenso. He ended his contract in May 2026.

== Personal life ==
Sebastián Ribas is the son of former Peñarol and Venezia head coach Julio César Ribas, and also has an Italian passport due to his mother, born in Palermo, Italy.

== Career statistics ==
As of match played 15 March 2018

Appearances and goals by club, season and competition
Club	Season	League			Cups		Continental		Other		Total	
Club	Season	Division	Apps	Goals	Apps	Goals	Apps	Goals	Apps	Goals	Apps	Goals
Inter Milan	2006–2007	Serie A	0	0	1	0	0	0	–		1	0
Inter Milan	2007–2008	Serie A	0	0	0	0	0	0	–		0	0
Spezia	2007–2008	Serie B	4	0	0	0	0	0	–		4	0
Dijon	2008–2009	Ligue 2	32	9	1	0	0	0	–		33	9
Dijon	2009–2010	Ligue 2	36	16	1	0	0	0	–		37	16
Dijon	2010–2011	Ligue 2	38	23	2	0	0	0	–		40	23
Dijon	Total		106	48	4	0	0	0	0	0	110	48
Sporting (loan)	2011–2012	Primeira Liga	5	0	2	0	0	0	–		7	0
Monaco B (loan)	2012–13	Championnat National 2	5	0	0	0	0	0	–		5	0
Barcelona S.C. (loan)	2013	Ecuadorian Serie A	5	0	0	0	2	0	–		7	0
Strasbourg (loan)	2013–14	Championnat National	13	4	0	0	0	0	0	0	13	4
Cartagena (loan)	2014–15	Segunda División B	24	6	0	0	0	0	1	0	25	6
Fénix	2015	Argentine Primera División	5	0	0	0	0	0	–		5	0
River Plate	2016	Argentine Primera División	10	1	0	0	6	0	–		16	1
Venados	2016–17	Ascenso MX	22	9	6	2	0	0	–		28	11
Karpaty Lviv	2017–18	Ukrainian Premier League	4	1	0	0	0	0	–		4	1
Patronato	2017–18	Argentine Primera División	21	11	0	0	0	0	–		21	11
Career total			224	80	13	2	8	0	1	0	246	82

== Honours ==
Inter Primavera

- Torneo di Viareggio: 2006

Individual

- Ligue 2 Player of the Year: 2010–11
- Ligue 2 Top scorer: 2010–11
