= Pablo López (footballer, born 1996) =

Uruguayan football player (born 1996)

Personal information
- Full name: Pablo Nicolás López de León
- Date of birth: 8 October 1996 (age 30)
- Place of birth: Paso de los Toros, Uruguay
- Height: 1.75 m (5 ft 9 in)
- Position: Midfielder

Team information
- Current team: Tacuarembó

Youth career
- Defensor Sporting

Senior career*
Years	Team	Apps	(Gls)
2017–2021	Defensor Sporting	56	(4)
2021–2022	→ Toluca (loan)	8	(0)
2022–2023	River Plate	54	(4)
2024–2025	Deportes La Serena	5	(0)
2025–2026	Progreso	19	(0)
2026–	Tacuarembó	0	(0)
- * Club domestic league appearances and goals as of 8 March 2026

Pablo Nicolás López de León (born 1 March 1996) is a Uruguayan footballer who plays as a midfielder for Uruguayan Segunda División club Tacuarembó.

== Career ==
In 2024, López moved to Chile and joined Deportes La Serena in the Primera B.
