= Francisco Ibáñez (footballer, born 1998) =

Uruguayan footballer

Personal information
- Full name: Francisco Sebastián Ibáñez Velázquez
- Date of birth: 17 April 1998 (age 28)
- Place of birth: La Paloma, Uruguay
- Height: 1.80 m (5 ft 11 in)
- Position: Center-back

Team information
- Current team: Albion
- Number: 4

Senior career*
Years	Team	Apps	(Gls)
2018–2021	Racing Club	24	(1)
2021–	Albion	15	(0)
- * Club domestic league appearances and goals as of 23 December 2021

Francisco Sebastián Ibáñez Velázquez (born 17 April 1998) is a Uruguayan footballer who plays as a defender for Albion in the Uruguayan Primera División.

== Career ==
=== Early career ===
Raised in La Paloma, a town within the Uruguayan department of Rocha, Ibáñez spent much of his youth career with local club Atlántico Baby Fútbol, later moving to Montevideo to join Racing Club.

=== Racing Club ===
Ibáñez began his senior career with Racing Club in 2018, making his competitive debut for the club on 29 July 2018 in a 0–0 draw with Atenas. He scored his first goal for the club later that season, scoring the equalizer in an eventual 2–1 victory over Fénix.

=== Albion ===
Prior to the 2021 season, Ibáñez joined Albion in the Uruguayan Segunda División. He made his debut on 30 June 2021, appearing as a 56th-minute substitute for Leandro Zazpe in a 2–1 defeat to Central Español.

== Career statistics ==
=== Club ===
As of match played 24 November 2021

Appearances and goals by club, season and competition
Club	Season	League			Cup		Other		Total	
Club	Season	Division	Apps	Goals	Apps	Goals	Apps	Goals	Apps	Goals
Racing Club	2018	Uruguayan Primera División	11	1	—	—	—	—	11	1
Racing Club	2019	Uruguayan Primera División	7	0	—	—	—	—	7	0
Racing Club	2020	Uruguayan Segunda División	6	0	—	—	2 (Note: Appearance(s) in the Uruguayan Segunda División promotion play-offs)	0	8	0
Racing Club	Total		24	1	—	—	2	0	26	1
Albion	2021	Uruguayan Segunda División	15	0	—	—	—	—	15	0
Albion	Total		15	0	—	—	—	—	15	0
Career total			39	1	—	—	2	0	41	1
