= Matías Alfonso =

Paraguayan footballer (born 2000)

Personal information
- Full name: Matías Iván Alfonso Colina
- Date of birth: 29 February 2000 (age 26)
- Place of birth: Ciudad del Este, Paraguay
- Height: 1.72 m (5 ft 8 in)
- Position: Midfielder

Team information
- Current team: River Plate (Montevideo)

Youth career
- 2020–21: Nacional

Senior career*
Years	Team	Apps	(Gls)
2021–22	Cerro	22	(1)
2022–	→ River Plate (Montevideo) (loan)	11	(0)
- * Club domestic league appearances and goals

Matías Iván Alfonso Colina (born 29 February 2000) is a Paraguayan footballer who plays as a midfielder for River Plate (Montevideo).

== Career ==
Starting his professional career playing for Uruguayan side Cerro in Segunda División, Alfonso signed for Uruguayan side River Plate (Montevideo) in January 2022.
