= José Arbío =

Uruguayan footballer (born 2003)

Personal information
- Full name: José Gabriel Arbío Rabelo
- Date of birth: 21 January 2003 (age 23)
- Place of birth: Canelones, Uruguay
- Height: 1.91 m (6 ft 3 in)
- Position: Goalkeeper

Team information
- Current team: River Plate Montevideo
- Number: 25

Youth career
- River Plate Montevideo

Senior career*
Years	Team	Apps	(Gls)
2025–	River Plate Montevideo	12	(0)
2025	→ Central Español (loan)	2	(0)

International career
2021–2023	Uruguay U20	6	(0)
Medal record
Men's football
Representing Uruguay
FIFA U-20 World Cup
Winner	2023 Argentina
South American U-20 Championship
Runner-up	2023 Colombia
- * Club domestic league appearances and goals as of 20 September 2026

José Gabriel Arbío Rabelo (born 21 January 2003) is a Uruguayan professional footballer who plays as a goalkeeper for Uruguayan Segunda División club River Plate Montevideo.

== Honours ==
Uruguay U20

- FIFA U-20 World Cup: 2023
- South American U-20 Championship runner-up: 2023
