= Julio César Ribas =

Uruguayan footballer and manager (born 1957)

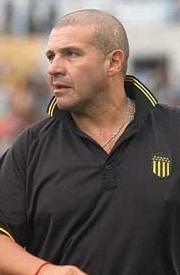
- Ribas as manager of Peñarol in 2009

Personal information
- Full name: Julio César Ribas Vlacovich
- Date of birth: 8 January 1957 (age 69)
- Place of birth: Rivera, Uruguay
- Height: 1.76 m (5 ft 9 in)
- Position: Midfielder

Senior career*
Years	Team	Apps	(Gls)
1975–1976	Bella Vista		
1977–1979	Nacional Montevideo		
1980	Liverpool Montevideo		
1981	Gimnasia LP	27	(0)
1982	Sud América		
1983–1984	Defensor Sporting	56	(0)
1985	River Plate Montevideo		
1986	Bella Vista		
1986–1987	Mayindú		
1987–1988	Nacional Montevideo	10	(0)
1989	Cartaginés		
1990	Bella Vista		
1991–1992	River Plate Montevideo		

International career
1985	Uruguay	5	(0)

Managerial career
- 1993–1995: Sud América
- 1996: Nacional Asunción
- 1997–1998: Bella Vista
- 1999–2001: Peñarol
- 2002–2003: Liverpool Montevideo
- 2004–2005: Venezia
- 2006–2007: Juventud de Las Piedras
- 2008: Oman
- 2009: Peñarol
- 2009: Fénix
- 2010–2012: Deportivo Maldonado
- 2013–2014: Bella Vista
- 2014: Cartagena (sporting director)
- 2016–2018: Lincoln Red Imps
- 2018–2025: Gibraltar
- 2025: River Plate Montevideo
- * Club domestic league appearances and goals

Julio César Ribas Vlacovich (born 8 January 1957) is a Uruguayan association football manager and former footballer who was most recently the head coach of Uruguayan Segunda División club River Plate Montevideo.

== International career ==
Ribas played five matches for Uruguay during 1985. He debuted on 23 April 1985 during the 2–1 friendly loss against Peru, and was shown a red card on 2 May 1985 during the 2–0 loss against Brazil. He was never called up again after the 6–0 victory against Malaysia on 1 June 1985.

== Career as manager ==
Ribas was appointed the manager of Primera Division Uruguaya side Peñarol in January 2009.

Following the Oman national football team's defeat against Japan in the 2010 FIFA World Cup qualifiers, the Omani Football Association sacked Ribas, due to the result and the performance of the team in that match.

He was appointed manager of Gibraltar in 2018. In February 2025, he stepped down from the position.

== Personal life ==
He is the father of footballer Sebastián Ribas who plays for Montevideo City.

== Career statistics ==
=== International ===
Appearances and goals by national team and year
National team	Year	Apps	Goals
Uruguay	1985	5	0
Total		5	0

== Honours ==
Title	Club	Country	Year
Segunda División	Sud América	Uruguay	1994
Torneo Integración de Primera Division de Uruguay	Sud América	Uruguay	1995
Segunda División	Bella Vista	Uruguay	1997
Liguilla Pre-Libertadores	Bella Vista	Uruguay	1998
Campeonato Uruguayo	Peñarol	Uruguay	1999
Torneo Clausura de Uruguay	Peñarol	Uruguay	1999
Torneo Clausura de Uruguay	Peñarol	Uruguay	2000
Torneo Classificatoria de Uruguay	Peñarol	Uruguay	2001
Segunda División	Liverpool	Uruguay	2002
Copa Montevideo de Uruguay	Liverpool	Uruguay	2003
Torneo Viareggio	Juventud de las Piedras	Uruguay	2006
Segunda División Profesional de Uruguay - Playoff de ascenso a Primera Division	Juventud de las Piedras	Uruguay	2007
National League	Lincoln	Gibraltar	2016
Rock Cup	Lincoln	Gibraltar	2016
Supercopa de Gibraltar	Lincoln	Gibraltar	2017
National League	Lincoln	Gibraltar	2018

== Managerial statistics ==
As of 19 November 2024

Team	From	To	Record				
Team	From	To	G	W	D	L	Win %
Venezia	1 July 2004	17 January 2005	24	3	7	14	12.50
Peñarol	20 January 2009	14 September 2009	19	8	4	7	42.11
Lincoln Red Imps	10 April 2016	9 April 2018	65	52	5	8	80.00
Gibraltar	1 July 2018	26 February 2025	64	8	11	45	12.50
Total			174	71	27	76	40.80
