= Valentín Adamo =

Uruguayan football player (born 2002)

Personal information
- Full name: Valentín Nicolás Adamo Reyes
- Date of birth: 4 May 2002 (age 24)
- Place of birth: San Jacinto, Uruguay
- Height: 1.93 m (6 ft 4 in)
- Position: Forward

Team information
- Current team: RWDM Brussels
- Number: 17

Youth career
- River Plate

Senior career*
Years	Team	Apps	(Gls)
2022–2023	River Plate	8	(2)
2023	→ Progreso (loan)	20	(10)
2023–2025	Botafogo	4	(0)
2024	→ Unión Española (loan)	21	(3)
2025	→ Boston River (loan)	17	(1)
2025–	RWDM Brussels	15	(2)
- * Club domestic league appearances and goals as of 20 April 2026

Valentín Nicolás Adamo Reyes (born 4 May 2002) is a Uruguayan footballer who plays as a forward for Belgian Challenger Pro League club RWDM Brussels.

== Career ==
On 21 August 2023, Brazilian club Botafogo signed Adamo from River Plate for a €280k transfer fee. In January 2024, he was loaned out to Chilean club Unión Española. After the loan ended, he returned to Botafogo.

In 2025, a year and a half after being signed, he made his debut for Botafogo in the 2–1 defeat of Maricá, coming from the bench. He appeared in other four games before being loaned out to Boston River. He made his first goal for the Uruguayan club in the 1–1 draw against Peñarol.

== Career statistics ==
As of 4 September 2023

Appearances and goals by club, season and competition
Club	Season	League			Cup		Continental		Other		Total	
Club	Season	Division	Apps	Goals	Apps	Goals	Apps	Goals	Apps	Goals	Apps	Goals
River Plate	2022	Uruguayan Primera División	8	2	—		0	0	—		8	2
Progreso (loan)	2023	Uruguayan Segunda División	20	10	—		—		—		20	10
Botafogo	2023	Série A	0	0	—		—		—		0	0
Career total			28	12	0	0	0	0	0	0	28	12
