= Agustín Chopitea =

Uruguayan football player (born 1999)

Personal information
- Full name: Ricardo Agustín Chopitea Trujillo
- Date of birth: 10 February 1999 (age 27)
- Place of birth: Mercedes, Uruguay
- Height: 1.75 m (5 ft 9 in)
- Position: Left-back

Team information
- Current team: Fénix
- Number: 15

Youth career
- 2018-2021: Nacional

Senior career*
Years	Team	Apps	(Gls)
2021	Cerro	17	(1)
2022–2023	River Plate Montevideo	43	(1)
2024–	Fénix	21	(2)
- * Club domestic league appearances and goals as of 16 September 2024

Ricardo Agustín Chopitea Trujillo (born 10 February 1999) is a Uruguayan footballer who plays as a defender for Fénix in the Uruguayan Primera División.
