= Ramiro Cristóbal =

Uruguayan footballer (born 1996)

Personal information
- Full name: Ramiro Nicolás Cristóbal Calderón
- Date of birth: 10 April 1996 (age 30)
- Place of birth: Fray Bentos, Uruguay
- Height: 1.82 m (6 ft 0 in)
- Position: Defensive midfielder

Team information
- Current team: Tecnico Universitario
- Number: 5

Youth career
- Defensor Sporting

Senior career*
Years	Team	Apps	(Gls)
2017–2022	Defensor Sporting	19	(1)
2020–2021	→ Rentistas (loan)	58	(0)
2022	→ Atlético Tucumán (loan)	3	(0)
2022–2025	River Plate	64	(5)
2025	Mushuc Runa	4	(0)
2025–	Tecnico Universitario	3	(0)

International career
2013	Uruguay U17	1	(0)
- * Club domestic league appearances and goals as of 20:57, 7 September 2022 (UTC)

Ramiro Nicolás Cristóbal Calderón (born 10 April 1996) is a Uruguayan footballer who play as defensive midfielder for Tecnico Universitario.
