= Institución Atlética Potencia =

Uruguayan football club

Potencia
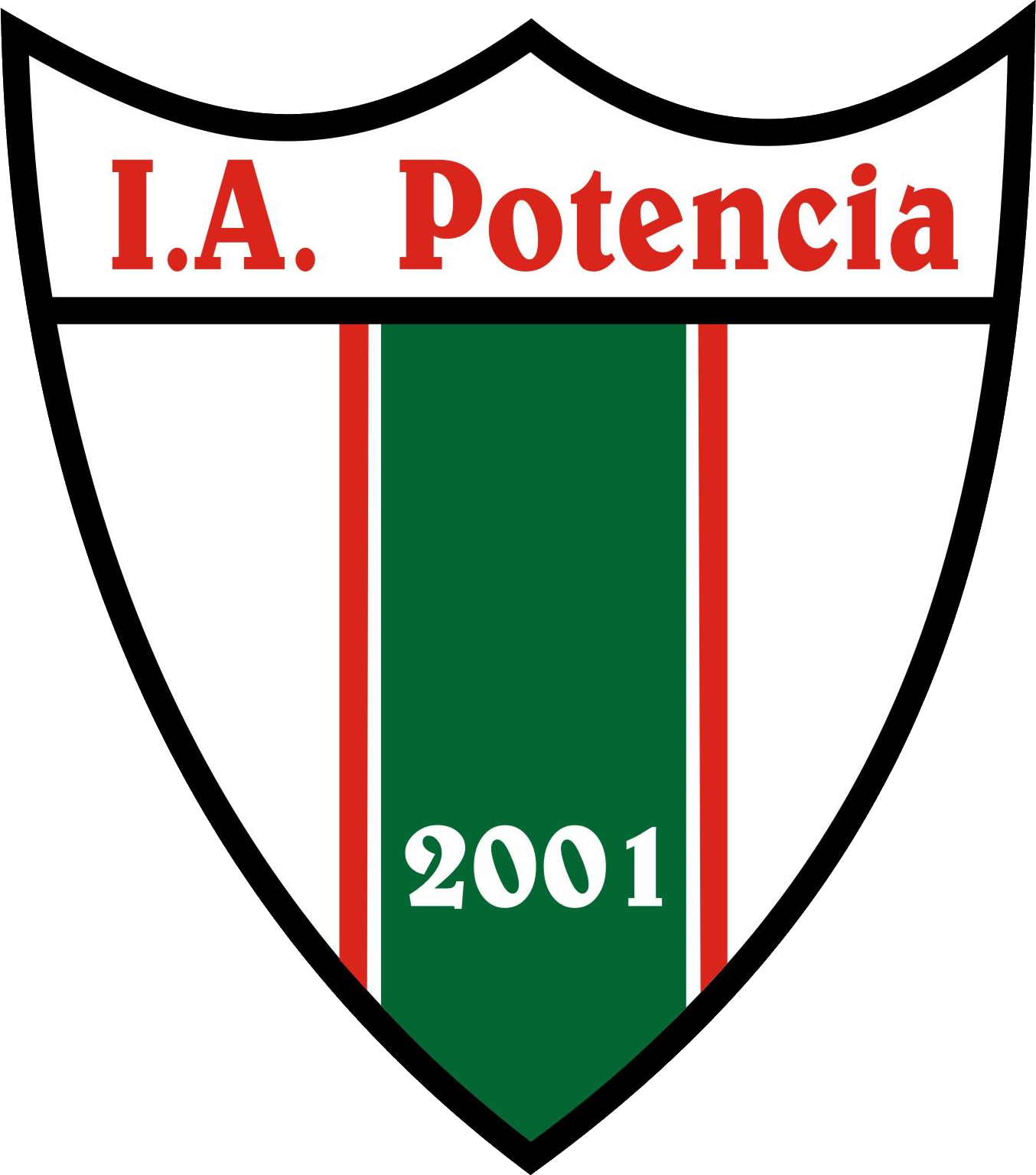
- Full name: Institución Atlética Potencia
- Nickname: "El Pote"
- Founded: February 13, 2001
- Ground: Parque 13 de Febrero; La Teja, Montevideo, Uruguay
- Capacity: 1,000
- Chairman: (Uruguay) Nazareth Ferreira
- Manager: (Uruguay) Luis Noble
- League: Uruguayan Segunda Division
- 2023: Segunda Division, 14th of 14
| Home colours | Away colours |

Institución Atlética Potencia is a Uruguayan football club from the neighbourhood of La Teja, Montevideo.

Founded in 2001, the club currently plays in the Uruguayan Segunda División after reaching promotion in 2022.

== Current squad ==
Note: Flags indicate national team as defined under FIFA eligibility rules; some limited exceptions apply. Players may hold more than one non-FIFA nationality.

| No. | Pos. | Nation | Player |
|---|---|---|---|
| — | GK | URU | Diego Baldriz |
| — | GK | URU | Fabio Rocha |
| — | GK | URU | Gonzalo Campora |
| — | DF | URU | Guillermo Fernández |
| — | DF | URU | Martín Tejeda |
| — | DF | URU | Damián Rosado |
| — | DF | URU | Gabriel Núñez |
| — | MF | URU | Gonzalo Larrosa |
| — | MF | URU | Atilio Álvez |
| — | MF | URU | Julio Martínez |
| — | MF | URU | Jhon Ferreira |
| — | MF | URU | Pablo Más |

| No. | Pos. | Nation | Player |
|---|---|---|---|
| — | MF | URU | Richard Irigoyen |
| — | MF | URU | José Roldán |
| — | MF | URU | Yonathan Rodríguez |
| — | MF | URU | Sebastián Casas |
| — | MF | URU | Matías Sánchez |
| — | FW | URU | Michael Suárez |
| — | FW | URU | Alfredo Salaverry |
| — | FW | URU | Gerardo Brandón |
| — | FW | URU | Javier Barcellos |
| — | FW | URU | Fabián Quiroga |
| — | FW | URU | Carlos Rodríguez |
| — | FW | URU | Christian Vaquero |
