= Juventud de Las Piedras =

Association football club in Uruguay

Juventud
- Full name: Club Atlético Juventud
- Nicknames: El Juve; Canarios; Pedrenses
- Founded: December 24, 1935; 90 years ago
- Ground: Parque Artigas, Las Piedras
- Capacity: 12,000
- Chairman: Yamandú Costa
- Manager: Sebastián Méndez
- League: Liga AUF Uruguaya
- 2025: Liga AUF Uruguaya, 4th of 16
Home colours	Away colours	Third colours

Club Atlético Juventud is a sports club based in Las Piedras, Canelones, Uruguay. CA Juventud won promotion to the Primera División Uruguaya to start in August 2007.

== History ==
The club was born from a group of youths from Las Piedras, Uruguay who played soccer at San Isidro Catholic school. On December 24, 1935 the boys arrived at school expecting to play (as always having arranged the match the day before), but when they got there the priests had forbidden it as they were preparing a big nativity crèche set on the field. Angry, the students, among them Carlos Maria Cabrera (who would later become the first president of the club) met in the town square and decided to found the club on Christmas Eve 1935, in rebellion against the priests.

Having created the club, Cabrera prompted them with the T-shirts to promote his father's business, who had a store on the corner of the square. This is how he got the club's first uniforms that were donated by the textile company ILDU as an arrangement. Therefore, in the first stages of its existence the club was called Club Ildu.

In 1946, at a meeting headed by very young entrepreneurs, some of them with great prominence in the local and national political arena, as Vivian Trias and Carlos Abete, dean of the Faculty of Chemistry, among others, resolved to change the club's name, to ensure its reputation from a group of youths from a neighbourhood to a serious institution and representative of the city of Las Piedras. They decided to honor they youths who created it by naming it as the current Club Atletico Juventud de Las Piedras (lit. 'Athletic Club of Youths from Las Piedras') and it officially acquired its present name with effect on 13 December 1947.

In later years they signed in the Liga Regional del Sur (Youth League of the Southern Region of Uruguay) in Football and Basketball tournaments, besides competing nationally in athletics and bowling. Although some years where tougher than others they progressively improved until they won the Southern Region's football youth league in 1980.

On that same year Juventud left the Youth League of the Southern Region and entered the Asociación Uruguaya de Fútbol, participating in the Metropolitan Amateur Football League (then Divisional C, now Uruguay's Segunda División Amateur) 1981 championship where they achieved a vice championship.

On November 5 of 1995, after several years of fighting for promotion they won the championship and ascended to the A.U.F's second division, the Segunda División de Uruguay, sometimes referred to as "B". Four years later, on November 6, 1999 they won the 2nd division championship, becoming the first team from the inner-country to achieve such a title and reach the main stage of Uruguayan soccer, the Primera División Uruguaya (the first and most important division of Uruguay's Football Association), where they remained until 2003. By doing so Juventud has the particularity of being the first team outside of Montevideo to beat Uruguay's two giants Club Nacional de Football and Club Atlético Peñarol, in February and September 2001 respectively In February 2006 a U-20 youth team representative of the club was invited to and won the Viareggio Youth Tournament on Viareggio Italy, making it along FK Partizan Belgrade from Serbia (then Yugoslavia), Sparta Prague and Dukla Prague of the Czech Republic (then Czechoslovakia) one of the only three countries to win the tournament outside Italy and one of the only four clubs to do so.

== Players ==
=== First-team squad ===
As of 26 February 2026

Note: Flags indicate national team as defined under FIFA eligibility rules; some limited exceptions apply. Players may hold more than one non-FIFA nationality.

No.	Pos.	Nation	Player
1	GK	URU	Sebastián Sosa (captain)
2	DF	ARG	Patricio Pernicone (on loan from Vélez Sarsfield)
3	DF	URU	Axel Prado
4	DF	URU	Martín Cáceres
5	DF	URU	David Morosini
6	DF	URU	Agustín Pérez
7	FW	URU	Agustín Alaníz
8	MF	URU	Mateo Izaguirre
9	FW	PAR	Marcelo Pérez (on loan from Huracán)
10	FW	URU	Bruno Larregui
11	FW	URU	Pablo Lago
12	GK	URU	Nicolás Rossi
14	MF	ARG	Leonel Roldan (on loan from Vélez Sarsfield)
15	FW	URU	Alejo Cruz
16	DF	URU	Renzo Rabino
18	DF	URU	Mauricio Rodríguez

No.	Pos.	Nation	Player
19	MF	ARG	Emanuel Cecchini
20	FW	URU	Renzo Sánchez (on loan from Nacional)
21	MF	URU	Facundo Pérez
22	MF	URU	Rodrigo Chagas
23	DF	ARG	Emmanuel Mas
24	DF	URU	Federico Barrandeguy
25	DF	URU	Ignacio Mujica
27	FW	URU	Juan Boselli
28	DF	URU	Franco Risso
30	MF	URU	Gonzalo Gómez
31	MF	URU	Iván Rodríguez
33	GK	URU	Nicolás Ruotola
36	MF	URU	Diego Simoes
37	MF	ARG	Ramiro Peralta
80	FW	URU	Fernando Mimbacas
90	FW	URU	Sebastián Guerrero

=== Out on loan ===
Note: Flags indicate national team as defined under FIFA eligibility rules; some limited exceptions apply. Players may hold more than one non-FIFA nationality.

No. / Pos. / Nation / Player; — / FW / URU / Agustín Rodríguez (at Atlas)	No. / Pos. / Nation / Player

== Titles ==
- Segunda División Uruguay: 1

1999

- Tercera División Uruguay: 1

1995

=== Other Official Domestic Honours ===
- Torneo Clausura Uruguayan 2nd Division: 1

2007

=== International Titles ===
- Torneo di Viareggio: 1

2006

== Former coaches ==
- (Uruguay) Julio Acuña (Jan 1, 1998 – Feb 15, 2001)
- (Uruguay) Julio César Ribas (Jan 1, 2006 – June 30, 2007)
- (Uruguay) Raúl Moller (July 1, 2007 – April 22, 2008)
- (Uruguay) Luis López (June 27, 2008 – Sep 30, 2008)
- (Uruguay) Voltaire García (April 15, 2009 – July 13, 2009)
- (Uruguay) Edgardo Arias (July 1, 2009 – June 30, 2010)
- (Uruguay) Luis López (2010 – Apr 2011)
- (Uruguay) Ariel de Armas (Sept 24, 2010 – April 22, 2013)
- (Uruguay) Mario Saralegui (April 23, 2013 – Nov 4, 2013)
- (Uruguay) Jorge Giordano (Nov 5, 2013–)
